= List of accidents and incidents involving commercial aircraft =

This list of accidents and incidents involving commercial aircraft includes notable events that have a corresponding Wikipedia article. Entries in this list meet this list's size criteria—passenger aircraft with a seating capacity of at least 10 passengers, or commercial cargo aircraft of at least 20,000 lb (9,100 kg). The list is grouped by the year in which the accident or incident occurred.

Contents
									1919
1920	1921	1922	1923	1924	1925	1926	1927	1928	1929
1930	1931	1932	1933	1934	1935	1936	1937	1938	1939
1940	1941	1942	1943	1944	1945	1946	1947	1948	1949
1950	1951	1952	1953	1954	1955	1956	1957	1958	1959
1960	1961	1962	1963	1964	1965	1966	1967	1968	1969
1970	1971	1972	1973	1974	1975	1976	1977	1978	1979
1980	1981	1982	1983	1984	1985	1986	1987	1988	1989
1990	1991	1992	1993	1994	1995	1996	1997	1998	1999
2000	2001	2002	2003	2004	2005	2006	2007	2008	2009
2010	2011	2012	2013	2014	2015	2016	2017	2018	2019
2020	2021	2022	2023	2024	2025	2026			
External links

== 1910s ==
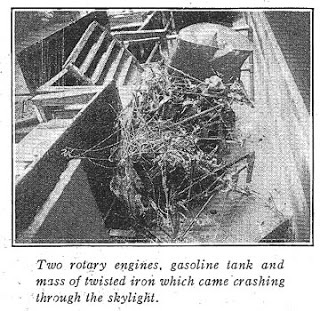
Wingfoot Air Express crash

=== 1919 ===
- July 21 – The Goodyear dirigible Wingfoot Air Express caught fire and crashed into the Illinois Trust and Savings Building in Chicago, Illinois, while carrying passengers to a local amusement park, killing 13 people: three out of the five on board and ten others on the ground, with 27 others on the ground being injured.
- August 2 – A Caproni Ca.48 crashed at Verona, Italy, during a flight from Venice to Taliedo, Milan, killing all on board (14, 15, or 17 people, according to different sources).

== 1920s ==
=== 1920 ===
- December 14 – A Handley Page O/400 hit a tree and crashed at Golders Green, London, after failing to gain height following takeoff, killing four out of eight on the plane.

=== 1921 ===
- August 26 – A SNETA Farman Goliath ditched in the North Sea. The aircraft was recovered, but the two crew members were missing.

=== 1922 ===
- March 31 – A Baoding Air Force Handley Page aircraft crashed while landing at Baoding Airport, killing all 14 on board in China's first fatal aviation accident.
- April 7 – In the Thieuloy-Saint-Antoine mid-air collision, a de Havilland DH.18A, G-EAWO, operated by Daimler Hire Ltd., collided with a Farman F.60 Goliath, F-GEAD, operated by Compagnie des Grands Express Aériens (CGEA), over the Thieulloy-St. Antoine road near Picardie, France, killing all seven people on both aircraft. This was the first mid-air collision of two airliners.

=== 1923 ===
- January 13 – An Aeromarine 75 seaplane of Aeromarine West Indies Airways, Columbus, rapidly sank after a botched ditching in the Straits of Florida north of Havana, Cuba, leading to the deaths of four passengers out of the nine occupants in the first airliner disaster of American aviation.
- May 14 – An Air Union Farman F.60 Goliath crashed near Monsures, Somme, France, following the structural failure of a wing, killing all six on board.
- August 27 – An Air Union Farman F.60 Goliath crashed near East Malling, Kent, England, because of an engine failure, and the passengers misunderstanding given instructions, killing one of 13 on board.
- September 14 – A Daimler Airway de Havilland DH.34 crashed at Ivinghoe, Buckinghamshire, England, after stalling while attempting an emergency landing, killing all five on board.

=== 1924 ===
- April 24 – A KLM Fokker F.III disappeared while flying from Croydon Airport to Waalhaven, killing all three on board. It was the first major accident of KLM since it had been founded four years earlier.
- December 24 – An Imperial Airways de Havilland DH.34 crashed near Purley, Surrey, England, because of a stall during an attempted emergency landing in response to an unknown mechanical defect. All eight on board were killed.

=== 1925 ===
- June 25 – A KLM Fokker F.III crashed near Forêt de Mormal, France, killing all four people on board.

=== 1926 ===
- July 9 – 1926 KLM Fokker F.VII crash: Fokker F.VII H-NACC crashed in thick fog near Wolverthem, Belgium while attempting to land, killing the pilot and passenger.
- August 18 – An Air Union Blériot 155 crashed during a failed emergency landing attempt at College Farm in Aldington, Kent, England, after experiencing an engine failure. Two of the 15 on board were killed on impact and the pilot died of his injuries one day later.
- October 2 – An Air Union Blériot 155 crashed at Leigh, Kent, England, after the aircraft caught fire in mid-air during an attempted emergency landing at Penshurst Airfield, killing all seven on board; this was the first in-flight fire to occur on an airliner.

=== 1927 ===
- August 22 – A KLM Fokker F. VIII crashed near Sevenoaks, Kent, England, following a structural failure of the tailfin, killing one of 11 on board.

=== 1928 ===
- July 13 – An Imperial Airways Vickers Vulcan crashed in fog during a test flight from Croydon Airport, killing one on board.
- July 24 – A KLM Fokker F. III crashed shortly after takeoff from Waalhaven Airport, Rotterdam, because of a stall and collision with ship masts, killing one of the six people on board.

=== 1929 ===
- June 17 – An Imperial Airways Handley Page W.10 ditched in the English Channel because of an engine failure, killing seven of the 13 on board.
- September 6 – An Imperial Airways de Havilland Hercules crashed whilst landing at Jask Airport, Iran, killing three of the five occupants.
- November 6 – A Luft Hansa Junkers G 24 crashed near Marden Park in Godstone, Surrey, England, killing seven of the eight occupants.

== 1930s ==
=== 1930 ===
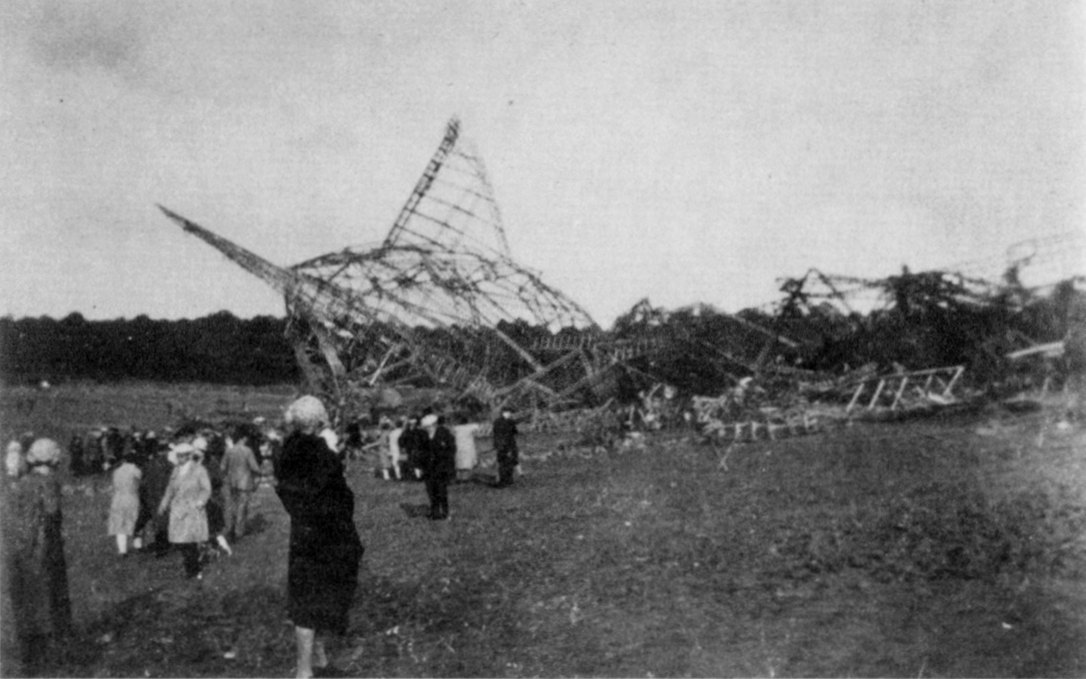
Photograph of remains of the airship R101

- February 10 – An Air Union Farman F.63 Goliath crashed during an emergency landing at Marden Airfield, Marden, Kent, following failure of the right tailplane, killing two of the six on board.
- October 5 – On its maiden voyage from the United Kingdom to British India, the British civil airship R101 crashed and burned in Allonne, Oise, France, while flying at low altitude at night in a rainstorm, killing 48 out of 54 on board, the worst civil airship disaster in history.

=== 1931 ===
- March 21 – An Australian National Airways Avro 618 Ten, Southern Cloud, disappeared in severe weather on a flight from Sydney to Melbourne, killing all eight on board in Australia's first significant airline disaster; the crash site in the Snowy Mountains remained undiscovered until 1958.
- March 31 – A Transcontinental & Western Air Fokker F-10 Trimotor crashed near Bazaar, Kansas, after a wing broke off in flight, killing all eight on board, including University of Notre Dame football coach Knute Rockne.
- December 6 – a KLM Fokker F.VIIb unable to take-off, struck into embankments and crashed into a rice field, killing 5 of the 7 on board.

=== 1933 ===
- March 28 – The 1933 Imperial Airways Diksmuide crash: An Armstrong Whitworth Argosy II caught fire in mid-air and crashed near Diksmuide, Belgium, in the first suspected case of air sabotage; all 15 on board were killed.
- October 10 – United Air Lines Trip 23, a Boeing 247, exploded in mid-air over Chesterton, Indiana, United States, in the first proven case of air sabotage on a commercial aircraft; all seven on board were killed.
- December 30 – In the 1933 Imperial Airways Ruysselede crash in Belgium, an Avro Ten struck a radio mast, killing all 10 on board.

=== 1934 ===
- February 23 – A United Air Lines Boeing 247 crashed into a Utah canyon in bad weather, killing all eight on board.
- May 9 – An Air France Wibault 282T crashed into the English Channel off Dungeness, Kent, killing all six on board.
- July 27 – A Swissair Curtiss T-32 Condor II crashed near Tuttlingen, Germany, after a wing separated in a thunderstorm, killing all 12 passengers and crew on board.
- September 29 – A London, Scottish & Provincial Airways Airspeed Courier crashed near Shoreham, England. All four people on board were killed and two on the ground were injured.
- October 2 – A Hillman's Airways de Havilland Dragon Rapide crashed into the English Channel off Folkestone, Kent, because of pilot error, killing all seven on board.
- December 20 – A KLM Douglas DC-2 crashed in the Iraqi desert while en route from Amsterdam to Batavia, Dutch East Indies. All seven people on board were killed.

=== 1935 ===
- April 6 – KLM Flight 676, a Fokker F.XII (named Leeuwerik), struck a mountain 15 km (9 mi) from Brilon, Germany while flying too low, killing all seven on board. The aircraft was flying low, possibly so the pilot could maintain visual contact with the ground. The aircraft entered a valley and encountered heavy snow, but could not get out of the valley and it crashed.
- May 6 – TWA Flight 6, a Douglas DC-2 operating a multi-leg flight from Los Angeles, California, to Newark, New Jersey, United States, crashed on farmland near Atlanta, Missouri, because of poor visibility and depleted fuel; five of the 13 on board were killed, including Senator Bronson M. Cutting.
- July 14 – In the 1935 Amsterdam Fokker F.XXII crash, a KLM Fokker F.XXII named Kwikstaart crashed and burned just outside Schiphol after both left side engines failed due to a defect in the fuel system, killing four crew and two passengers. Fourteen occupants survived. More powerful fuel pumps were installed in the Fokker F.XXII and the hand pump was changed so that it could be used regardless of the fuel tap position. Similar aircraft types were also removed from service and changes were made so that this type of failure would not happen again.
- July 17 – In the 1935 Bushehr KLM Douglas DC-2 crash, a KLM Douglas DC-2 namedMaraboe was destroyed by fire after a rough, uneven runway caused severe damage during a nighttime takeoff from Bushir, though all passengers and crew escaped unharmed.
- July 20 – In the 1935 San Giacomo Douglas DC-2 crash: A KLM Douglas DC-2-115E namedGaai crashed near the San Bernardino Pass near Pian San Giacomo due to wing and fuselage icing, killing all three crew and all 10 passengers.
- July 24 – A SACO Trimotor Ford 5-AT-B and SCADTA Trimotor Ford 5-AT-B that operated the same route Medellin-Bogota collided in the runway, killing all seven people in the SACO Trimotor Ford 5-AT-B and 10 of the 13 people in the SCADTA Trimotor Ford 5-AT-B
- October 7 – United Air Lines Trip 4, a Boeing 247D flying from Salt Lake City, Utah, to Cheyenne, Wyoming, United States, crashed near Silver Crown, Wyoming, because of pilot error; all 12 people on board died.
- December 10 – A SABENA Savoia-Marchetti S.73 crashed near Tatsfield, Surrey, England, because of pilot error, while en route from Brussels Airport, Belgium, to Croydon Airport in England; all 11 people on board died in the accident.

=== 1936 ===
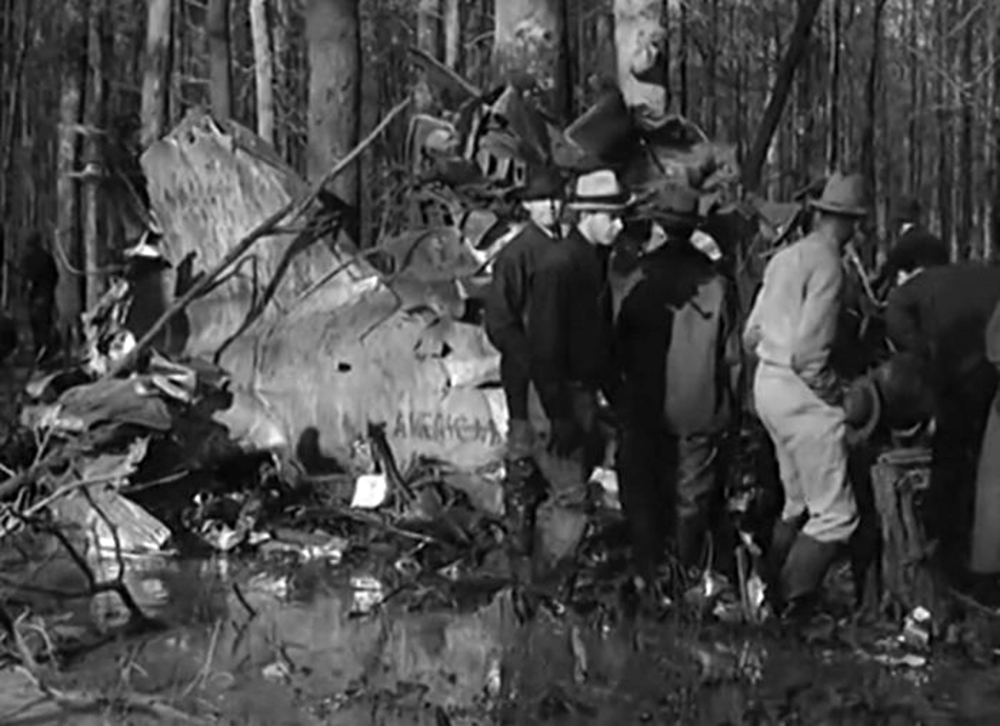
- Wreckage of American Airlines Flight 1 (1936)
  January 14 – American Airlines Flight 1, a Douglas DC-2, crashed into a swamp near Goodwin, Arkansas, for reasons unknown, killing all 17 passengers and crew on board.
- April 7 – TWA Flight 1, a Douglas DC-2, crashed near Uniontown, Pennsylvania, United States, because of pilot error, killing 12 of the 14 passengers and crew.
- June 16 – In the Havørn Accident, a Norwegian Air Lines Junkers Ju 52 crashed into Lihesten mountain in Hyllestad, Norway, killing all seven on board.
- August 5 – Chicago and Southern Flight 4, a Lockheed Model 10 Electra, crashed after takeoff because of pilot error, killing all eight on board.
- December 9 – A KLM Douglas DC-2 crashed on takeoff from Croydon Airport, England; 15 of 17 on board died.
- December 27 – United Air Lines Flight 34, a Boeing 247, crashed at Rice Canyon (near Newhall, California, United States) because of pilot error, killing all 12 on board.

=== 1937 ===
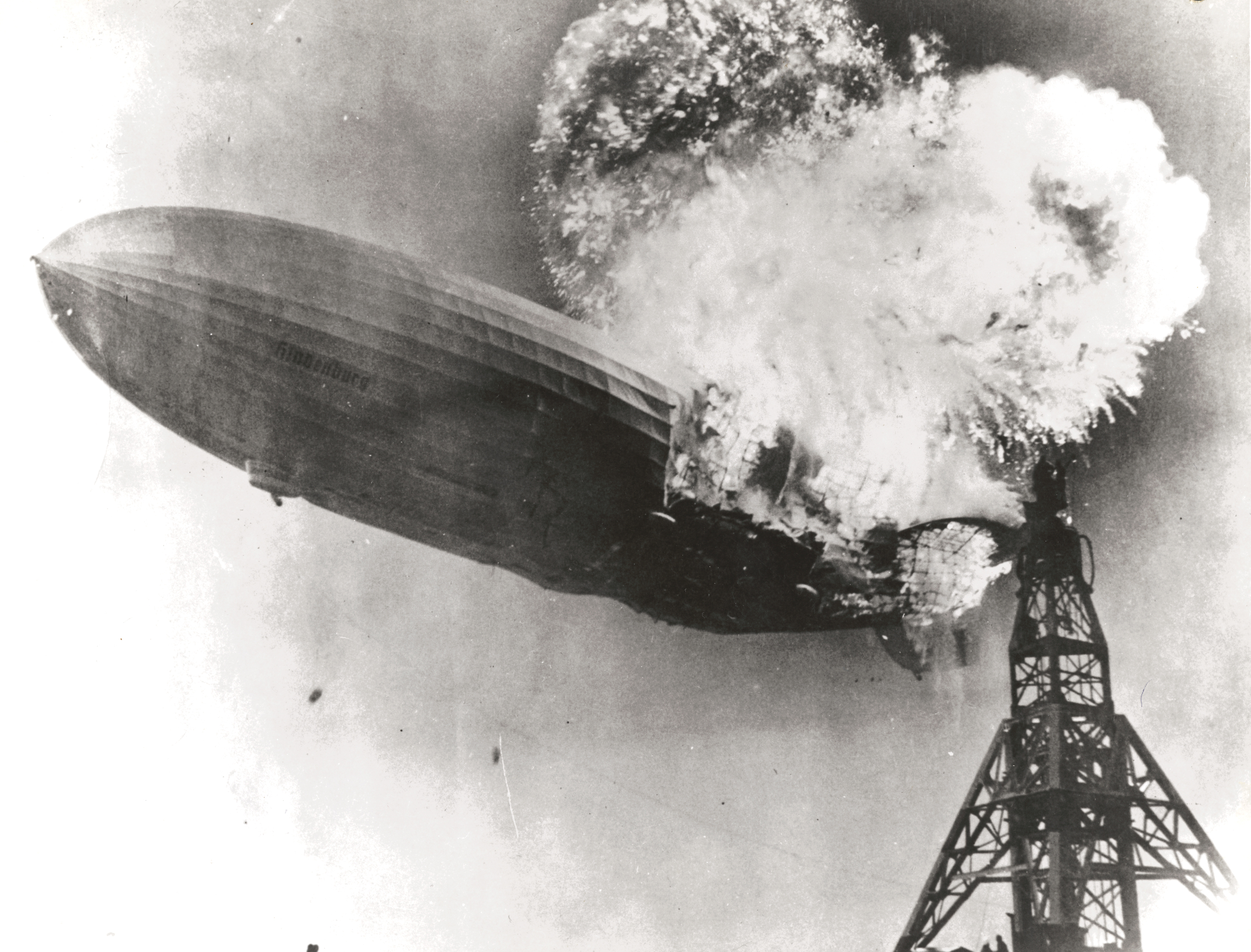
Deutsche Zeppelin-Reederei Hindenburg bursting into flames, 1937

- January 12 – Western Air Express Flight 7, a Boeing 247, crashed into a mountain near Newhall, California, United States. Five of the 13 people on board died, including adventurer, author and filmmaker Martin Johnson.
- February 19 – An Airlines of Australia Stinson Model A suffered a controlled flight into terrain in Queensland, killing four of the seven people on board.
- March 25 – TWA Flight 15A, a Douglas DC-2, crashed in Clifton, Pennsylvania, because of ice accumulation. All 13 passengers and crew were killed.
- May 6 – The Zeppelin Hindenburg burst into flames and crashed while attempting a landing at Naval Air Engineering Station, Lakehurst, New Jersey, United States; of the 97 people on board, 35 were killed; one person on the ground also died.
- July 28 – A KLM Douglas DC-2 crashed shortly after takeoff from Brussels, killing all 15 on board, including Dutch socialist Nathan Nathans.
- November 16 – A Sabena Junkers Ju 52 crashed in Ostend, killing all 11 on board, including the Grand Duke Georg Donatus and Grand Duchess Cecilie of Hesse.

=== 1938 ===
- January 10 – Northwest Airlines Flight 2, a Lockheed L14H Super Electra, crashed near Bozeman, Montana, United States, killing all 10 on board; the machine with which the manufacturer measured component vibration was found to be inaccurate, causing the aircraft to be more prone to flutter than anticipated.
- January 11 – Pan American World Airways Flight 1, a Sikorsky S-42 flying boat named the Samoan Clipper, exploded in mid-air over Pago Pago, American Samoa, killing all seven on board.
- March 1 – TWA Flight 8, a Douglas DC-2, disappeared on a flight from San Francisco to Winslow, Arizona; the aircraft was found three months later on a mountain in Yosemite National Park; all nine on board died.
- July 28 – Pan Am Flight 229, a Martin M-130 flying boat named Hawaii Clipper, disappeared over the Pacific Ocean westbound from Guam to Manila with 15 on board.
- August 24 – The Kweilin, a Douglas DC-2 operated by China National Aviation Corporation, was shot down by Japanese military aircraft killing 14 of the 17 people on board. It was the first shootdown of a civilian airliner.
- October 25 – Kyeema, an Australian National Airways Douglas DC-2, crashed in heavy fog into Mount Dandenong in Victoria, Australia, killing all 18 people on board.
- November 4 – In the 1938 Jersey Airport disaster, a Jersey Airways de Havilland D.H.86 crashed on takeoff from Jersey Airport because of pilot error; all 13 passengers and crew lost their lives as well as one person on the ground.

=== 1939 ===
- January 13 – Northwest Airlines Flight 1, a Lockheed L14H Super Electra, crashed on descent to Miles City, Montana, United States, after an intense fire broke out in the cockpit following a fuel leak from the aircraft's cross-feed fuel valve; all four on board were killed.
- January 21 – An Imperial Airways flying boat ditched in the North Atlantic, 285 miles (459 km) southeast of New York, after losing power; the aircraft later sank and three of the 12 on board died.
- August 13 – A Pan Am Sikorsky S-43 crashed into Guanabara Bay, Brazil, because of loss of control following engine failure, killing 12 of the 14 on board.
- September 26 - Shooting of the Mees: A KLM Douglas DC-3-194G (named Mees) was flying from Malmö to Amsterdam when it was attacked by a German fighter over the North Sea, killing one of 12 on board. Despite being hit by 65 bullets, the aircraft was able to land safely at Schiphol Airport. Following this incident, all KLM aircraft were repainted orange with "HOLLAND" in capital letters on the fuselage (the Netherlands was neutral during WWII).

== 1940s ==
=== 1940 ===
- June 14 – In the Kaleva shootdown, Aero Flight 1631, an Aero Junkers Ju 52 en route from Tallinn, Estonia, to Helsinki, Finland, was shot down by two Soviet bombers over the Gulf of Finland during peacetime; all nine on board were killed.
- August 31 – In the Lovettsville air disaster, Pennsylvania Central Airlines Trip 19, a Douglas DC-3A, crashed at Lovettsville, Virginia, United States, during an intense thunderstorm; all 25 on board died.
- November 8 – A Deutsche Lufthansa Ju 90 crashed near Schönteichen in Saxony, Germany, because of tail icing, killing all 29 passengers and crew on board.

=== 1941 ===
- February 26 – Eastern Air Lines Flight 21, a Douglas DC-3, crashed while descending to land at Atlanta, Georgia, United States, killing 8 of 16 on board; World War I hero and Eastern Air Lines president Eddie Rickenbacker was among the survivors.
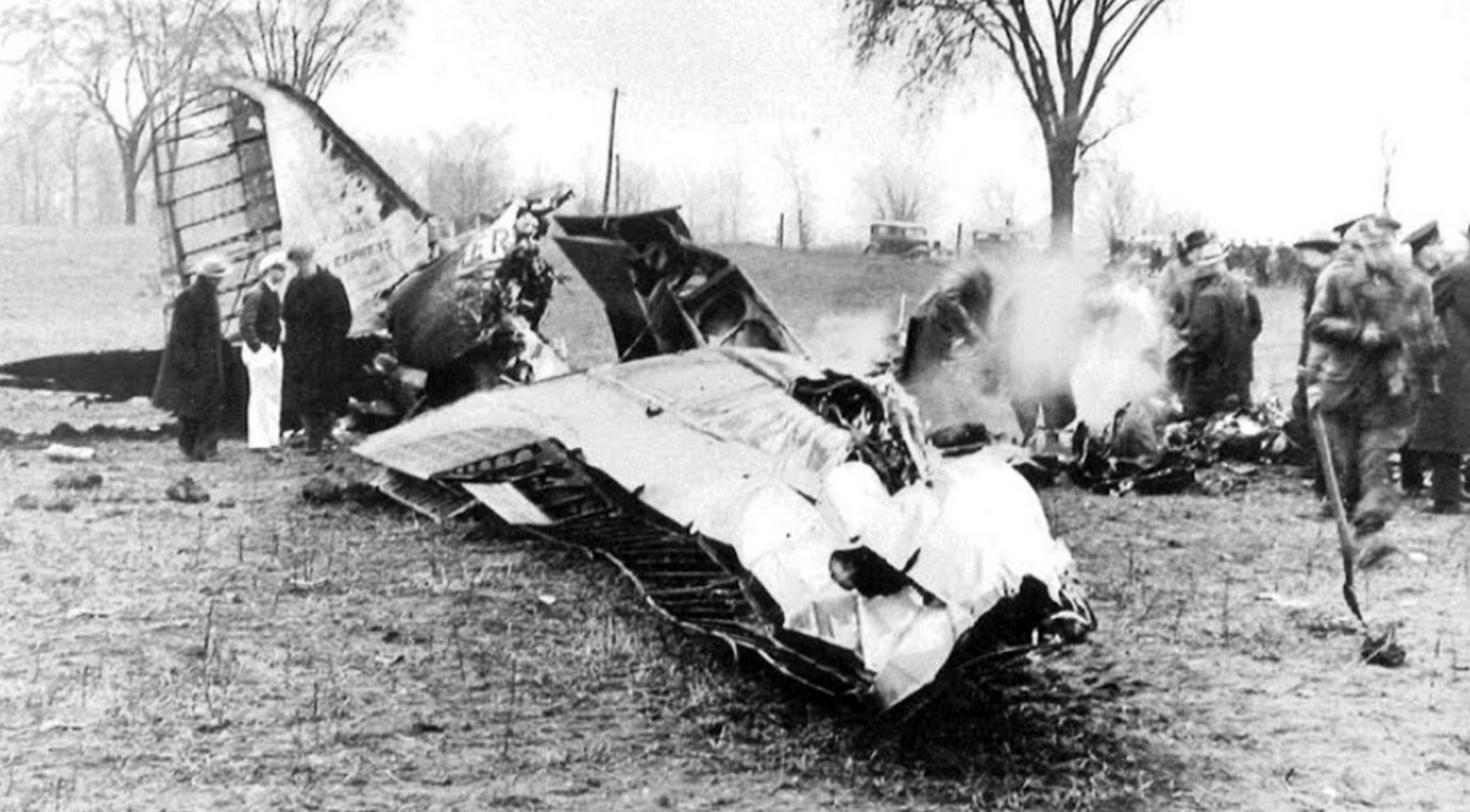
- Wreckage of American Airlines Flight 1 (1941)
  October 30 – American Airlines Flight 1, a Douglas DC-3, stalled and crashed at Lawrence Station, Ontario, Canada, while attempting to find a place to land, killing all 20 on board; the cause of the crash was never determined.
- October 30 – Northwest Airlines Flight 5, a Douglas DC-3, crashed at Moorhead, Minnesota, in fog, because of icing; of the 15 on board, only the pilot survived.

=== 1942 ===
- January 16 – TWA Flight 3, a Douglas DC-3 returning to California, crashed into Potosi Mountain 30 miles (48 km) southwest of Las Vegas, Nevada, United States; all 22 on board were killed, including actress Carole Lombard and her mother.
- January 30 – Qantas Short Empire G-AEUH was shot down by seven Japanese fighters and crashed 13 nautical miles (24 km) from East Timor; 13 of 18 on board were killed.
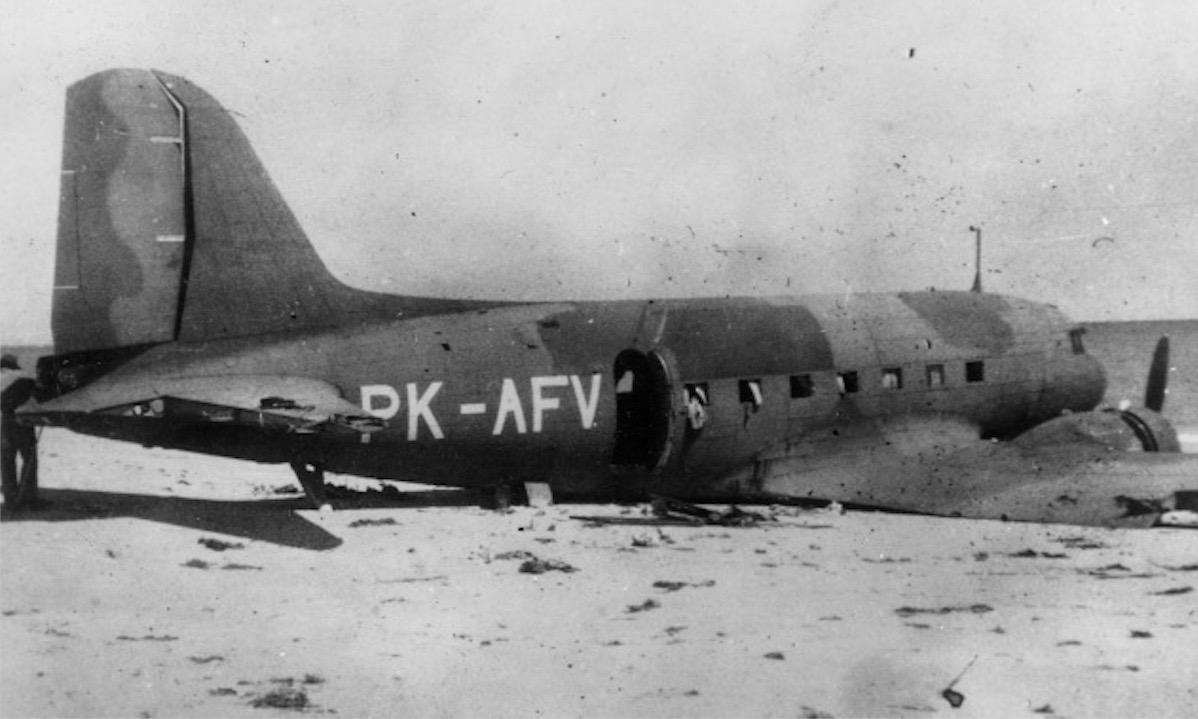
- Wreckage of PK-AFV
  March 3 – KNILM Douglas DC-3 PK-AFV was shot down by three Japanese fighters and crashed 50 miles (80 km) north of Broome, Western Australia, killing four of 12 on board.
- October 23 – American Airlines Flight 28, a Douglas DC-3, crashed near Palm Springs, California, United States, after colliding with a U.S. Army Air Corps Lockheed B-34 bomber; the DC-3 crashed, killing all 12 on board, while the bomber landed safely with minor damage.
- December 14 – A Tupolev ANT-20bis crashed outside Tashkent, Uzbekistan, after a passenger took control and turned off the autopilot, killing all 36 on board.

=== 1943 ===
- January 21 – Pan Am Flight 1104, a Martin M-130 named the Philippine Clipper, crashed into a mountain near Boonville, California, United States, because of pilot error; all 19 occupants were killed, including Rear Admiral Robert H. English, the serving submarine commander of the US Pacific Fleet.
- February 22 - The Pan Am Boeing 314 flying boat Yankee Clipper crashed in the Tagus river near Lisbon, Portugal, killing 24 of the 39 people on board.
- June 1 – BOAC Flight 777, a Douglas DC-3 flying from Lisbon in Portugal, to Bristol, England, was shot down by Luftwaffe fighter aircraft over the Bay of Biscay, killing all 17 people on board, including film actor Leslie Howard.
- July 28 – American Airlines Flight 63, a Douglas DC-3 named the Flagship Ohio, crashed near Trammel, Kentucky, United States, after the crew lost control in severe turbulence and violent downdrafts; 20 of the 22 people on board were killed.
- August 2 – A Consolidated C-87 Liberator Express operated by United Air Lines on a lease agreement from the USAAF, crashed near Whenuapai, New Zealand, killing 16 of the 30 people on board.
- October 15 – American Airlines Flight 63, a Douglas DC-3 named the Flagship Missouri, crashed near Centerville, Tennessee, United States, because of wing and propeller icing; all eight passengers and three crew members were killed.

=== 1944 ===
- February 10 – American Airlines Flight 2, a Douglas DC-3, crashed into the Mississippi River between Arkansas and Tennessee, United States, for reasons unknown, killing all 24 occupants (21 passengers and three crew members).
- June 20 – TWA Flight 277, a Douglas C-54 Skymaster, crashed into Fort Mountain, Maine, United States, in severe weather, killing all seven passengers and crew on board.

=== 1945 ===
- January 8 – The China Clipper, a Pan Am Martin M-130 flying boat operating an airmail service from Miami, Florida, United States, to Leopoldville in the Belgian Congo, crashed at Port of Spain, Trinidad, killing 23 of the 30 people on board.
- January 10 – American Airlines Flight 6001, a Douglas DC-3-277B, crashed into a hillside on approach to Hollywood Burbank Airport, killing all 24 on board.
- January 31 – The Tokana, a Stinson operated by Australian National Airways, crashed near Tooborac, about 50 miles (80 km) north of Melbourne, Victoria, as the result of a fatigue crack in a wing spar; all 10 people on board were killed.
- February 23 – American Airlines Flight 009 crashed on Glade Mountain, Virginia, while en route from New York to Washington, then Nashville and then Los Angeles. Out of the 22 occupants, 17 were killed.
- July 12 – Eastern Air Lines Flight 45, a Douglas DC-3A, collided with a Douglas A-26 Invader over Florence, South Carolina, United States; one of the 20 on board the DC-3 and two of the three on board the A-26 died.
- October 5 – National Airlines Flight 16, a Lockheed L-18 Lodestar operating a multi-leg domestic flight in Florida, United States, overshot the runway after landing at the new municipal airport in south Lakeland, killing two of the 15 people on board.
- October 16 - In the 1945 Beiping C-46 crash, a USAAF Curtiss C-46 struck an antenna on approach to Nanyuan Airport and crashed near Beiping (now Beijing), killing all 59 on board.
- November 3 – The Honolulu Clipper, Boeing's 314 prototype, made a forced landing in the Pacific Ocean 650 miles (1,050 km) east of Oahu following double engine failure; all 37 on board survived the incident; the aircraft was deliberately sunk when salvage was deemed impractical.

=== 1946 ===
- January 6 – Pennsylvania Central Airlines Flight 105, a Douglas DC-3, crashed in Birmingham, Alabama, United States, killing three of the four crew members; the flight attendant and all 16 passengers survived.
- March 3 – American Airlines Flight 6-103, a Douglas DC-3, struck into a slope during a descent. All 27 on board died in the deadliest crash of an American airliner at that time.
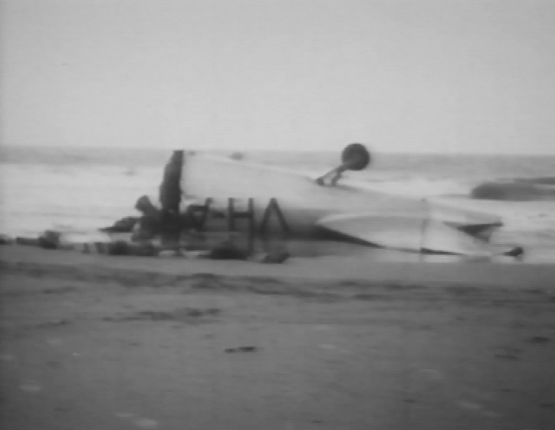
- Wreckage of the 1946 Australian National Airways DC-3 crash
  March 10 – The 1946 Australian National Airways DC-3 crash near Hobart, Tasmania, killed all 25 on board.
- July 11 – TWA Flight 513, a Lockheed L-049 Constellation, crashed near Reading, Pennsylvania, United States, after a fire in the baggage compartment; of the six crew on board, only one survived.
- August 7 – British European Airways Flight 530, a Douglas C-47, crashed into Mistberget mountain near Eidsvoll, Norway, killing three of five crew; all 10 passengers survived.
- September 18 – A Sabena Douglas DC-4 crashed near Gander, Canada. 27 of the 44 people on board were killed.
- September 20 – China National Aviation Corporation Flight 81, a Douglas C-47 flying from Xiaomiao to San Hu Pa, crashed near Luoji Shan, China. All 31 people on board were killed.
- October 3 – An American Overseas Airlines Douglas DC-4 crashed into mountainous terrain after takeoff from Stephenville, Newfoundland, killing all 39 passengers and crew on board.
- November 14 – In the 1946 KLM Douglas DC-3 Amsterdam accident, a Douglas DC-3 crashed while attempting to land at Amsterdam Schiphol Airport in the Netherlands; all 26 passengers and crew on board were killed.
- December 14 - China National Aviation Flight 31, a Douglas C-47, struck a mountain in Changxing County, China, killing all six on board.
- December 19 – In the 1946 Railway Air Services Dakota crash, a Douglas DC-3 crashed shortly after taking off from Northolt Airport, England and came to rest on top of a house. All five occupants survived the crash without injury.
- December 25 – Black Christmas disaster:
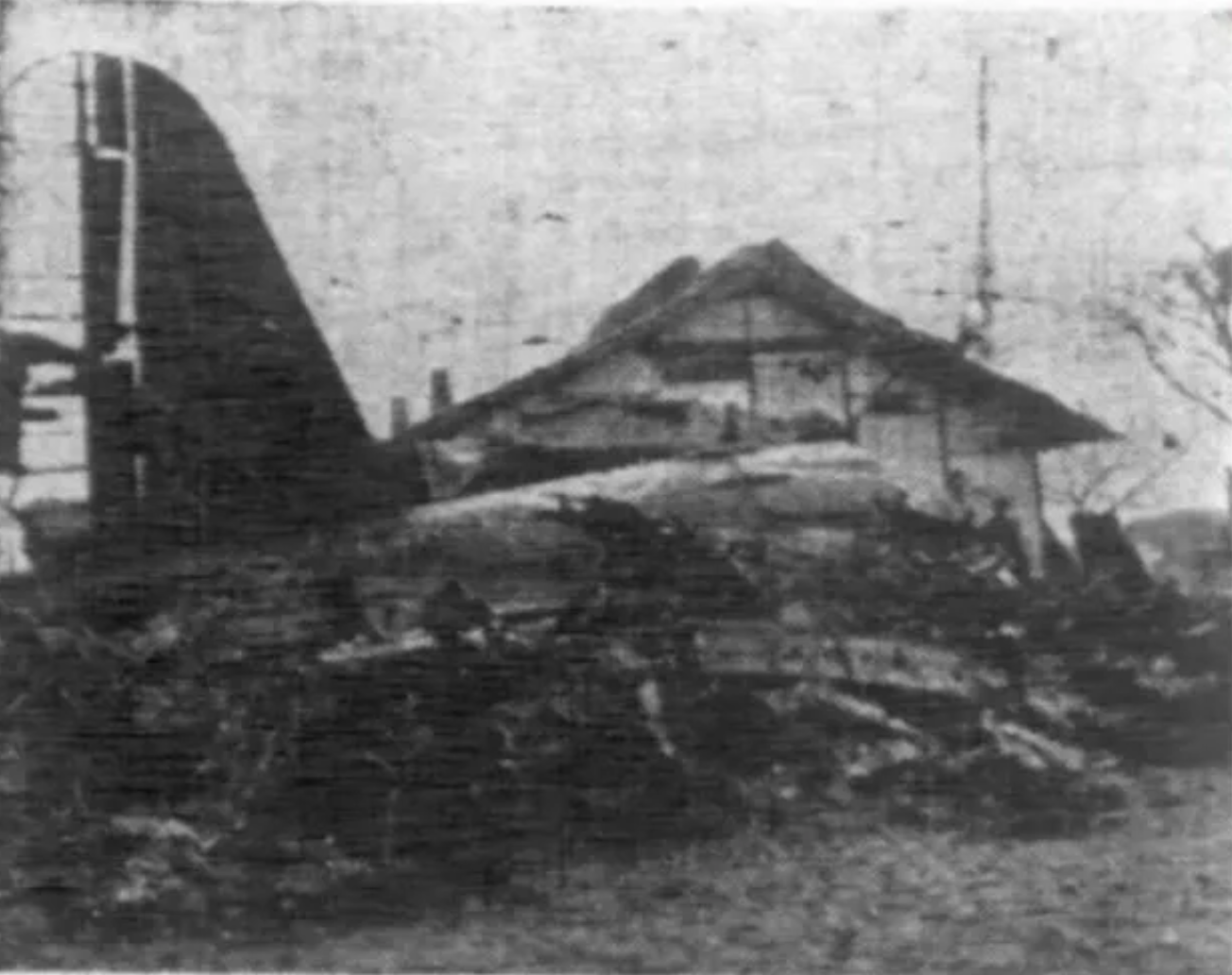
  - Wreckage of Central Air Transport Corporation Flight 48
    Central Air Transport Corporation Flight 48, a Douglas C-47, hit the roof of a house and crashed during descent. All 11 occupants and one person on the ground died.
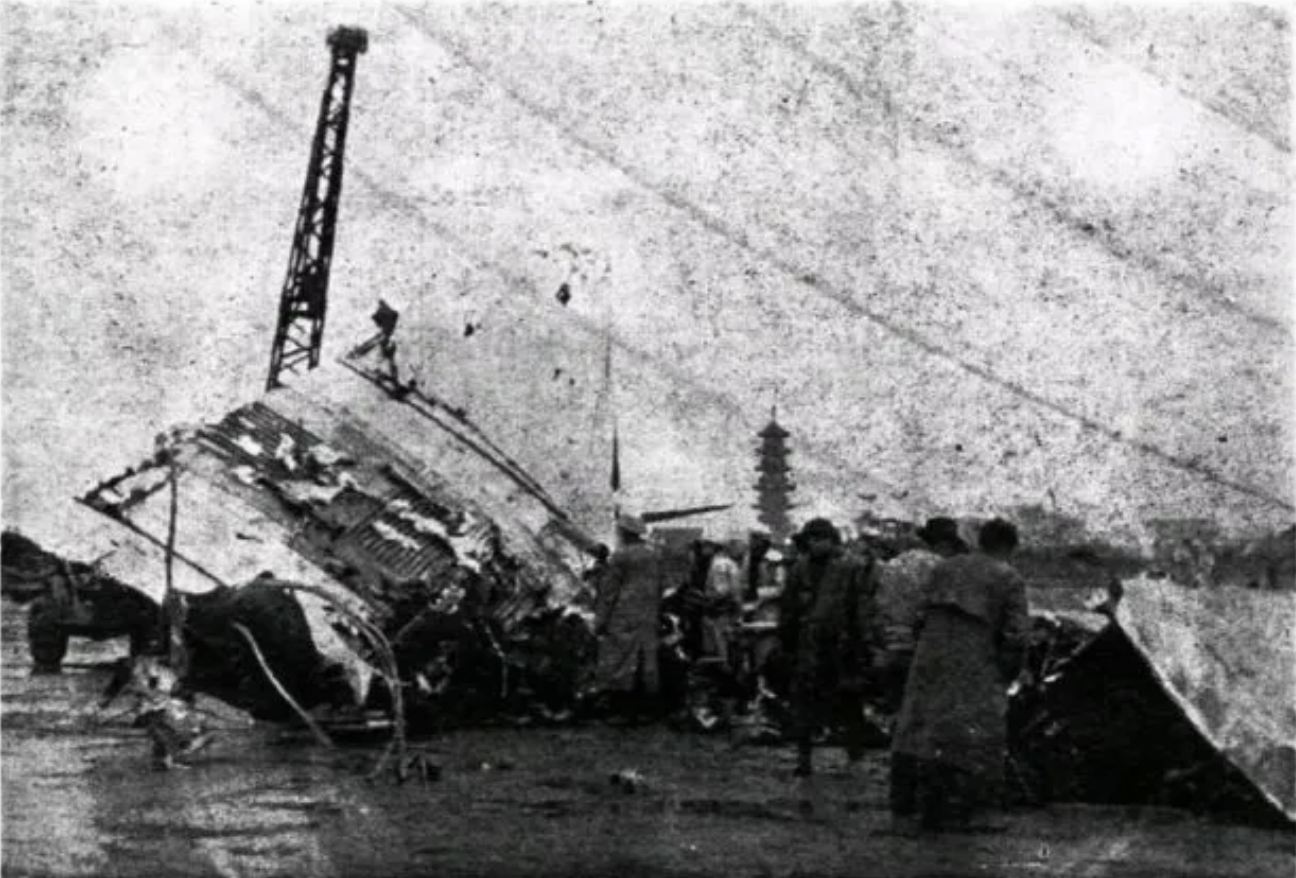
  - Wreckage of China National Aviation Corporation Flight 140
    China National Aviation Corporation Flight 140, a Douglas DC-3, hit the slope of a hill short of the runway during descent, killing 19 of the 30 on board.
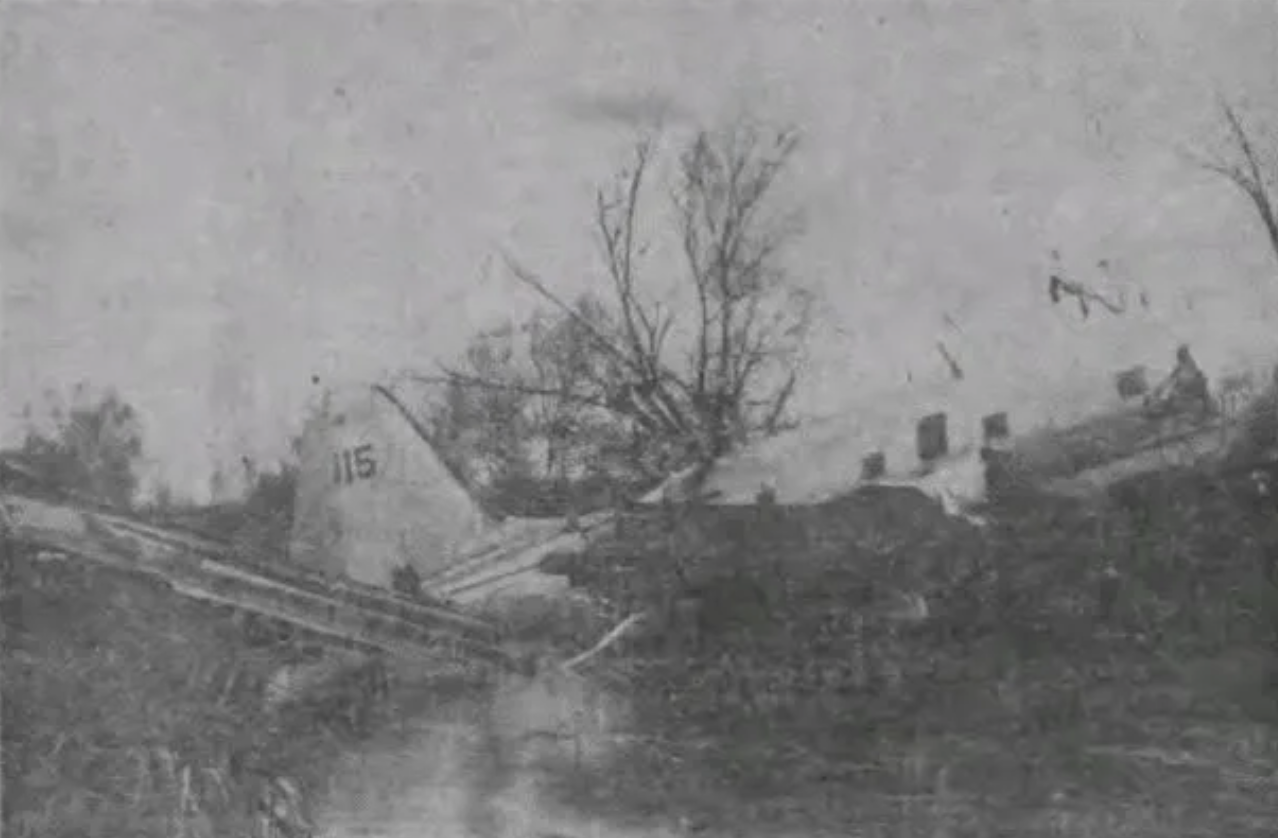
  - Wreckage of China National Aviation Corporation Flight 115
    China National Aviation Corporation Flight 115, a Curtiss C-46, crashed short of the runway, killing 31 of the 36 occupants.
- December 28 – TWA Flight 6963, a Lockheed L-049 Constellation, crashed near Shannon Airport, Ireland, because of an inaccurate altimeter, caused by maintenance errors, killing nine of 23 on board.
- December 28 – American Airlines Flight 2207, a Douglas C-50, crashed near Michigan City, Indiana, United States, following double engine failure, caused by unexplained fuel starvation; both pilots died, while the remaining crew member and all 18 passengers survived.

=== 1947 ===
- January 5 – China National Aviation Corporation Flight 121, a Curtiss C-46, crashed into Langya Mountain in an attempt to make an emergency landing due to fuel starvation, killing all 42 on board.
- January 11 – In the 1947 BOAC Douglas C-47 crash, a BOAC Douglas C-47A crashed into Barley Hill near Stowting, Kent, United Kingdom, because of fuel starvation, killing eight of the 16 on board.
- January 12 – Eastern Air Lines Flight 665, a Douglas C-49, crashed into high ground near Galax, Virginia, after the pilot became disorientated; of the 17 on board, only one survived.
- January 25 – In the 1947 Croydon Dakota accident, a Spencer Airways Douglas C-47A failed to get airborne at Croydon Airport, United Kingdom, and crashed into a parked ČSA aircraft; 12 of the 22 on board were killed.
- January 26 – In the 1947 KLM Douglas DC-3 Copenhagen accident, a Douglas DC-3 crashed shortly after takeoff from Kastrup Airport in Denmark, killing all 22 passengers and crew.
- February 15 – An Avianca Douglas DC-4 crashed into Mount El Tabalazo in Colombia because of pilot error, killing all 53 passengers and crew.
- April 22 – In the 1947 Columbus mid-air collision, a Delta Air Lines Douglas DC-3 collided with a Tuskegee Aviation Institute Vultee BT-13, killing all nine people on board both aircraft.
- April 28 – Trans-Canada Air Lines Flight 3, a Lockheed Model 18 Lodestar flying from Toronto to Vancouver with a stopover in Lethbridge, crashed into mount Elsay. All 15 people on board were killed.
- May 29 – In the 1947 Héðinsfjörður air crash, a Flugfélag Islands Douglas DC-3 crashed into Hestfjall on the west side of Héðinsfjörður fjord, killing all 25 on board in Iceland's deadliest air disaster.
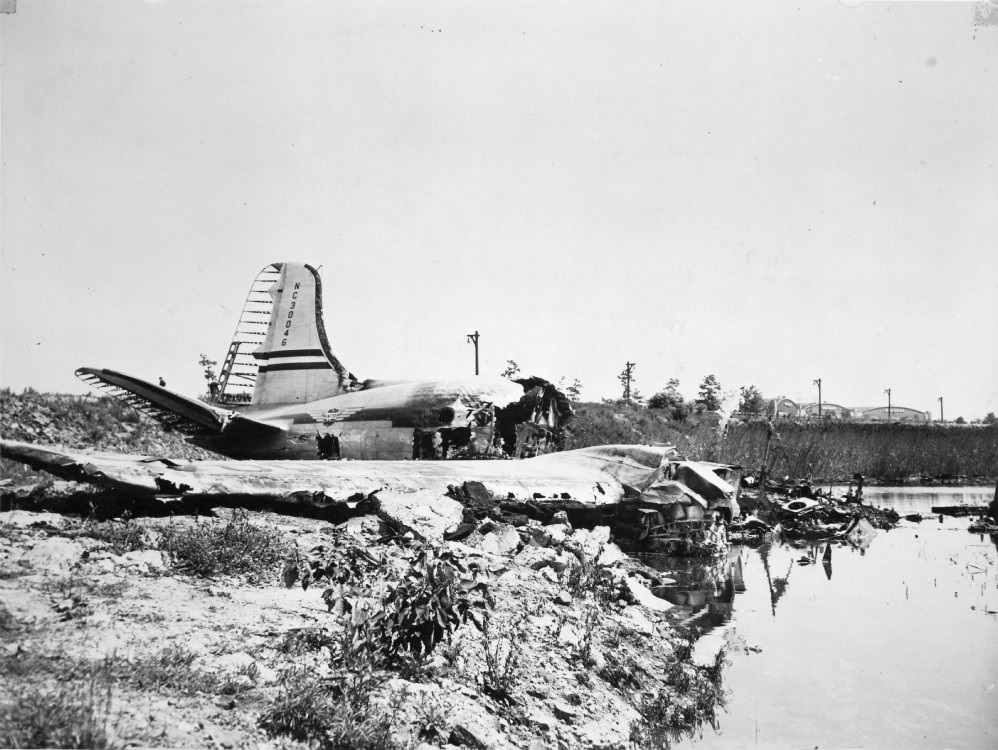
- Wreckage of United Air Lines Flight 521
  May 29 – United Air Lines Flight 521, a Douglas DC-4, crashed on takeoff from LaGuardia Airport, New York, United States, because of pilot error; 42 of the 48 on board died.
- May 30 – Eastern Air Lines Flight 605, a Douglas DC-4, lost control and crashed near Bainbridge, Maryland, United States, killing all 53 passengers and crew on board in the deadliest airliner crash in US history at the time.
- June 13 – Pennsylvania Central Airlines Flight 410, a Douglas DC-4, crashed into Lookout Rock, in the West Virginia Blue Ridge Mountains of the United States, en route from Pittsburgh to Washington, D.C.; all 50 passengers and crew were killed.
- June 19 – Pan Am Flight 121, a Lockheed L-049 Constellation, crashed in the Syrian desert, en route from Karachi to Istanbul, killing 14 of the 36 on board.
- July 4 – United Airlines Flight 105, a Douglas DC-3, reportedly observed an unidentified object. The incident was among the 1947 flying disc craze.
- August 2 – In the 1947 BSAA Star Dust accident, an Avro Lancastrian airliner disappeared over the Andes after transmitting an enigmatic coded message ("STENDEC"); the fate of the aircraft remained a mystery for more than 50 years until the crash site was finally located in 2000; it was apparent that all 11 people on board had died in the accident.
- August 28 – In the Kvitbjørn disaster, a Norwegian Air Lines Short Sandringham flying boat struck a mountain near Lødingsfjellet, Norway, killing all 35 on board.
- October 24 – United Air Lines Flight 608, a Douglas DC-6, crashed near Bryce Canyon Airport, Utah, United States, when a fire caused by a design flaw destroyed the aircraft; all 52 on board died in the first hull loss of the DC-6.
- October 26 – Pan Am Flight 923, a Douglas DC-4, crashed into Tamgas Mountain on Annette Island, Alaska, for reasons unknown, killing all 18 passengers and crew.
- December 27 – In the 1947 Korangi Creek crash, an Air India Douglas C-48 crashed shortly after takeoff, killing all 23 on board.

=== 1948 ===
- January 28 – In the 1948 Los Gatos DC-3 crash, an Airline Transport Carriers Douglas DC-3 crashed in the Diablo Range, California, after an engine fire; all 32 passengers and crew were killed.
- January 30 – In the BSAA Star Tiger disappearance, an Avro Tudor IV disappeared without trace en route from the Azores to Bermuda with 31 on board; the loss of the aircraft remains an unsolved mystery, with the resulting speculation contributing to the Bermuda Triangle legend.
- March 2 – In the 1948 Heathrow disaster, a Sabena DC-3 crashed at Heathrow Airport, London, in poor visibility. The crash, caused by pilot error, killed 20 of 22 on board.
- March 10 – Delta Air Lines Flight 705, a Douglas DC-4, crashed on takeoff from Chicago Municipal Airport. Of the 13 passengers and crew, 12 were killed.
- March 12 – Northwest Airlines Flight 4422, a Douglas C-54 Skymaster, crashed into Mount Sanford in the Alaska Territory (now Alaska), killing all 30 on board; although found, the wreckage was initially inaccessible and was not rediscovered until 1999 after being buried for more than 50 years.
- April 5 – In the 1948 Gatow air disaster, a British European Airways Vickers VC.1 Viking crashed near RAF Gatow, Berlin, following a collision with a Soviet Air Force Yakovlev Yak-3 fighter; all 14 people on board the Viking were killed, as well as the Soviet pilot.
- April 15 – Pan Am Flight 1-10, a Lockheed Constellation, crashed while on approach to Shannon Airport, Ireland; of the 31 people on board, only one survived.
- April 21 – British European Airways Flight S200P, a Vickers VC.1 Viking, crashed into Irish Law Mountain in Scotland because of pilot error; all on board survived.
- May 12 – In the 1948 Sabena Douglas DC-4 crash, a Douglas DC-4 crashed near Libenge, Belgian Congo (now Democratic Republic of the Congo), after flying into a tornado, killing 31 of 32 on board.
- June 17 – United Air Lines Flight 624, a Douglas DC-6, crashed near Mount Carmel, Pennsylvania, after failed attempts to extinguish what was believed to have been an onboard fire; all 39 passengers and four crew were killed.
- July 1 – An Avio Linee Italiane Fiat G.212, flying from Milan to Brussels, crashed near Keerbergen during an emergency landing; eight of the 12 people on board were killed.
- July 4 – The 1948 Northwood mid-air collision, between a Scandinavian Airlines System-operated Douglas DC-6 and an RAF Avro York, killed all 39 passengers and crew on board both aircraft.
- July 17 – Miss Macao, a Catalina seaplane en route from Macau to Hong Kong in southern China, was hijacked over the Pearl River delta by a group attempting to rob the passengers; following a struggle in the cockpit, a crash killed all but one of the 26 people on board (the sole survivor was later identified as the lead hijacker); this is the earliest known airliner hijacking.
- August 1 – Air France Flight 072, a Latécoère 631, disappeared over the Atlantic Ocean with the loss of all 52 people on board. This was the worst aviation accident in the Atlantic Ocean at the time and remains the worst ever involving the Latécoère 631.
- August 29 – Northwest Airlines Flight 421, a Martin 2–0–2, crashed near Winona, Minnesota, because of structural failure of a wing, killing all 37 on board in the worst ever accident involving the Martin 2–0–2. This crash was also the first loss of a 2–0–2.
- August 31 –A Sabena Douglas C-47 went out of control during its approach to the airport and crashed during an the emergency landing. All 13 on board died.
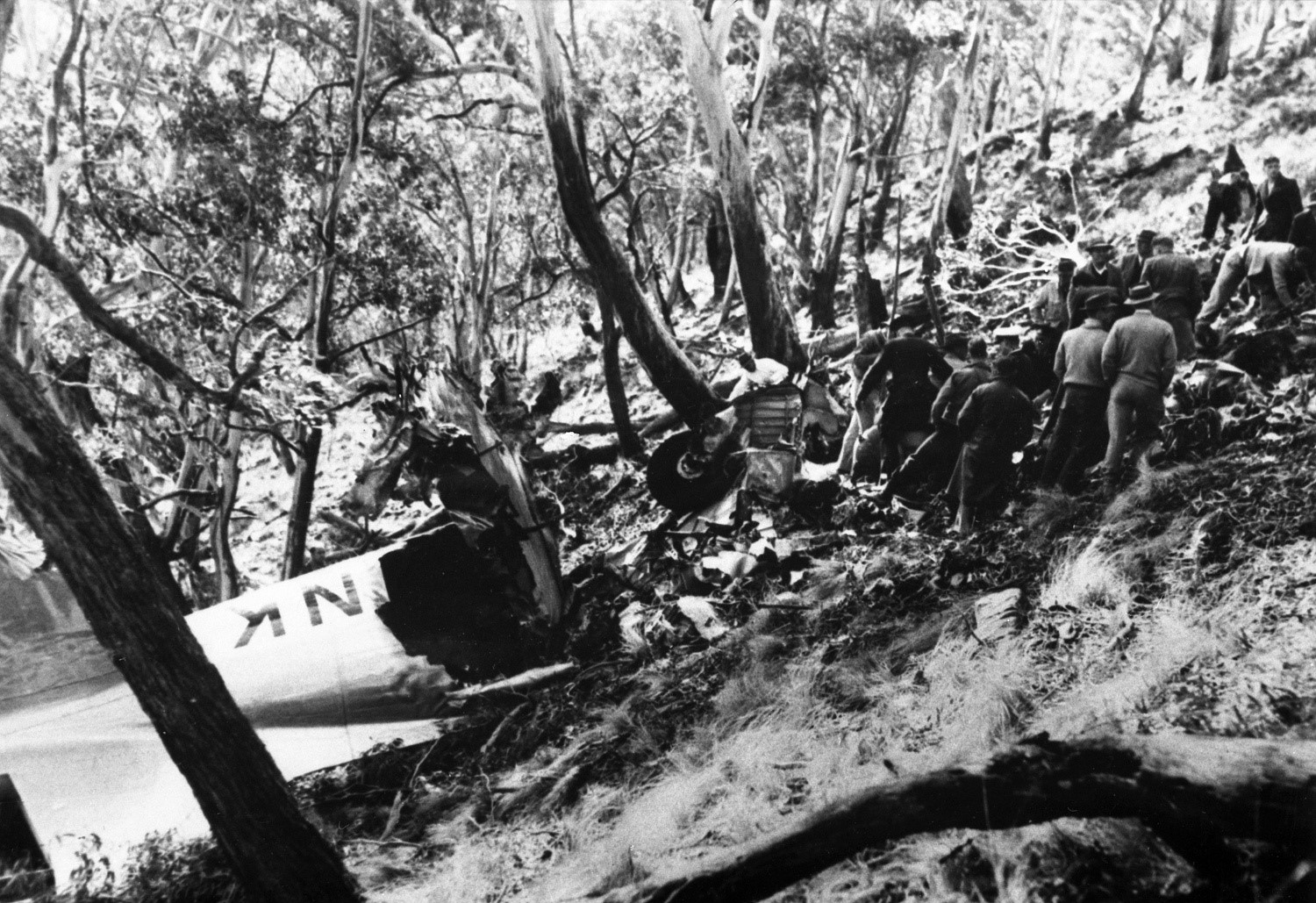
- The crash site of Australian National Airways Flight 331
  September 2 – Australian National Airways Flight 331, a Douglas DC-3, crashed into high terrain near Nundle, New South Wales, killing all 13 people on board.
- October 2 – In the Bukken Bruse disaster, a Norwegian Air Lines Short Sandringham flying boat crashed upon landing in Trondheim, Norway, killing 19 of the 43 people on board; Bertrand Russell was among the 24 survivors.
- October 12 – An Aeroflot Ilyushin Il-12 disappeared over the Caucasus Mountains, near Yevlakh, Azerbaijan, with ten on board.
- October 20 – In the 1948 KLM Constellation air disaster, a Lockheed Constellation named Nijmegen, flying from Schiphol Airport, Netherlands, to New York City, United States, crashed near Prestwick, Scotland, killing all 40 on board.
- December 28 – In the 1948 Airborne Transport DC-3 (DST) disappearance, a Douglas DC-3 flying from San Juan, Puerto Rico, to Miami, Florida, disappeared without trace off the coast of Florida with 32 on board.

=== 1949 ===
- January 17 – In the BSAA Star Ariel disappearance, an Avro Tudor IV disappeared without trace en route from Bermuda to Jamaica with 20 on board; the loss of the aircraft remains an unsolved mystery to this day, with the resulting speculation contributing to the Bermuda Triangle legend.
- January 30 – Pan Am Flight 100, a Lockheed L-749 Constellation, collided in mid-air with a private Cessna 140 over Port Washington, New York. The Cessna crashed, killing the pilot and the sole passenger; the Constellation sustained substantial damage but landed without casualties.
- February 19 – A British European Airways Douglas Dakota collided with an RAF Avro Anson over Exhall, Warwickshire, killing all 14 on board both aircraft.
- March 10 – A Queensland Airlines Lockheed Lodestar crashed on takeoff from Coolangatta airstrip, killing all 21 on board.
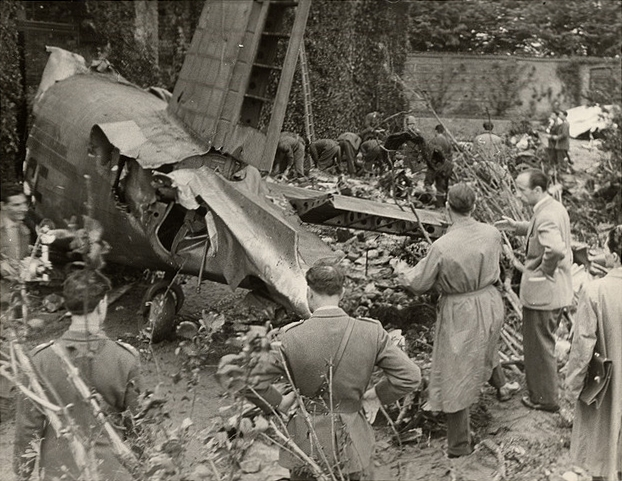
- Wreckage of the Fiat G.212CP after the Superga air disaster
  May 4 – In the Superga air disaster, an Italian Airlines Fiat G.212 CP carrying the Torino football team crashed into the Superga hills near Turin, killing all 31 on board.
- June 7 – In the 1949 Strato-Freight Curtiss C-46A crash, a Curtiss Wright C-46A-50 Modified D crashed into the Atlantic Ocean shortly after takeoff from San Juan, Puerto Rico. Of the 81 passengers and crew, 53 were killed.
- July 2 – A MacRobertson Miller Airlines Douglas DC-3 crashed on takeoff from Perth, Western Australia, killing all 18 on board.
- July 12 - A KLM Lockheed L-749 Constellation crashed into a hill near Bombay during an approach in severe weather, killing all 45 occupants.
- July 12 – Standard Air Lines Flight 897R, a Curtiss C-46, crashed at Chatsworth, California, because of pilot error, killing 35 of 48 on board.
- August 19 – A British European Airways Douglas DC-3 crashed into a hillside near Oldham, United Kingdom; of the 32 on board, only eight survived.
- September 9 – Canadian Pacific Air Lines Flight 108, a Douglas DC-3, exploded over Cap Tourmente near Sault-au-Cochon, Quebec. The cause was a bomb planted by Albert Guay; all 19 passengers and four crew members were killed.
- September 26 – A Mexicana de Aviacion DC-3 crashed into Popocatepetl volcano, killing all 23 on board.
- October 28 – Air France Flight 009, a Lockheed Constellation, crashed into a mountain on São Miguel Island, Azores, Portugal, killing all 48 people on board, including boxer Marcel Cerdan and violinist Ginette Neveu.
- November 1 – Eastern Air Lines Flight 537, a Douglas DC-4, collided with a Lockheed P-38 on approach to Washington National Airport; all 55 people on board the DC-4 died, including Congressman George J. Bates, New Yorker cartoonist Helen E. Hokinson, and former Congressman Michael J. Kennedy; the pilot and sole occupant of the P-38 was seriously injured.
- November 14 – Maszovlet Flight 381, a Lisunov Li-2, crashed into a mountain in Pécs, killing all but one of the seven onboard in the first civil plane crash in Hungary.
- November 20 – In the Hurum air disaster, an Aero Holland Douglas DC-3 crashed near Hurum, Norway, killing 34 of the 35 on board, including 25 children.
- November 29 – American Airlines Flight 157, a Douglas DC-6 en route from New York City to Mexico City with 46 passengers and crew, veered off the runway and struck buildings after the flight crew lost control on final approach to Dallas Love Field; 26 passengers and two flight attendants died.
- December 7 – An Arrow Air Douglas DC-3 crashed near Benicia, California, killing all nine people on board.
- December 18 – A Sabena Douglas DC-3 crashed after suffering a structural failure of a wing, killing all eight on board.

== 1950s ==
=== 1950 ===
- January 5 – In the 1950 Sverdlovsk plane crash, a Lisunov Li-2 crashed near Sverdlovsk (now Yekaterinburg), Soviet Union, killing all 19 on board.
- March 7 – Northwest Orient Airlines Flight 307, a Martin 2–0–2, crashed near Minneapolis–Saint Paul International Airport after hitting a flagpole during approach, killing all 13 on board and two on the ground.
- March 12 – In the Llandow air disaster, an Airflight Avro 689 Tudor V stalled and crashed on approach to Llandow Aerodrome in Wales. Improper loading caused the centre of gravity to exceed the aft limit; 80 of the 83 people on board died, at the time the worst air disaster in history.
- 1950 Bahrain Air France Douglas DC-4 crashes:
  - June 12 – An Air France Douglas DC-4 (F-BBDE) on a flight from Saigon to Paris crashed in the Arabian Sea while on approach to Bahrain Airport, killing 46 of 52 on board.
  - June 14 – An Air France Douglas DC-4, F-BBDM, crashed in the Arabian Sea while on approach to Bahrain Airport, killing 40 of 53 on board. This aircraft was operating on the same flight route as F-BBDE.
- June 24 – Northwest Orient Airlines Flight 2501, a Douglas DC-4 with 58 people on board, disappeared without trace over Lake Michigan.
- June 26 – Australian National Airways Amana, a Douglas DC-4, crashed after takeoff from Perth Airport, killing all 29 people on board.

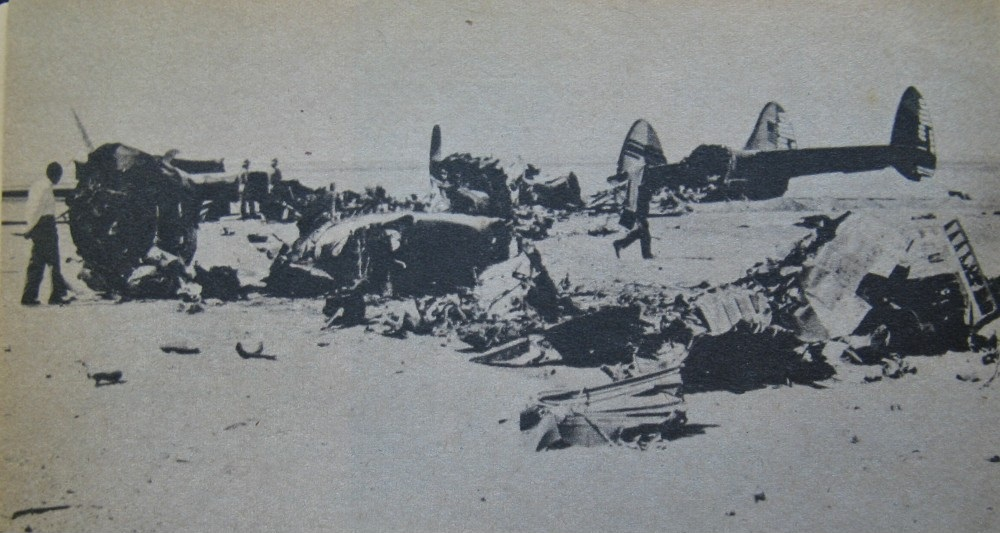
Burnt wreckage of TWA Flight 903

- August 31 – TWA Flight 903, a Lockheed L-749A Constellation, crashed in the desert about 65 miles (105 km) NNW of Cairo, Egypt, following an engine fire. The crash, the worst ever accident involving the Lockheed L-749, killed all 55 on board.
- October 31 – A British European Airways Vickers VC.1 Viking crashed on the runway at London Heathrow Airport in foggy weather; of the 30 on board, only a stewardess and a passenger survived.
- November 3 – Air India Flight 245, a Lockheed L-749A Constellation, crashed into Mont Blanc in France; all 40 passengers and eight crew were killed.
- November 13 – In the 1950 Tête de l'Obiou C-54 crash, a Douglas C-54 Skymaster operated by Curtiss Reid Flying Services crashed 30 miles (48 km) from Grenoble, France, on the Tête de l'Obiou mountain; all 52 passengers and crew died.

=== 1951 ===
- January 14 – National Airlines Flight 83, a Douglas DC-4, crashed on landing at Philadelphia International Airport, Pennsylvania. Seven of the 28 passengers and crew were killed, one of them being flight attendant Frankie Housley, who died trying to save more passengers.
- January 31 - An Air Iceland Douglas DC-3 crashed on approach to Faxaflói, killing all 20 on board.
- March 27 – In the 1951 Ringway Dakota crash, an Air Transport Charter Douglas DC-3 crashed shortly after taking off from Manchester-Ringway Airport, England. Two of the three crew members were killed.
- April 21 – An Aeroflot Antonov An-2 disappeared while flying from Kyzyl to Abakan. The plane was located in 2019. All four people on board were killed in the first fatal crash of the An-2.
- April 25 – Cubana de Aviación Flight 493, a Douglas DC-4 en route from Miami to Havana, collided in mid-air with a United States Navy Beech SNB-1 Kansan off Key West; all 43 on board both aircraft were killed.
- June 22 – Pan Am Flight 151, a Lockheed L-049 Constellation en route from Accra, Ghana, to Monrovia, Liberia, crashed into a hill near Sanoyie in Bong County, Liberia, 54 miles (86 km) from the airport; all 31 passengers and six crew members died.
- June 30 – United Air Lines Flight 610, a Douglas DC-6, crashed into a mountain in Larimer County, Colorado, because of navigational error; all 45 passengers and five crew members were killed.
- July 16 – Qantas Flight LW, a de Havilland Australia DHA-3 Drover, crashed in the Huon Gulf while en route from Wau to Lae, Papua New Guinea following a loss of control due to engine separation, killing all seven on board.
- July 21 – Canadian Pacific Air Lines Flight 3505, a Douglas DC-4, disappeared on a flight from Vancouver to Tokyo; all 37 on board were presumed dead; the aircraft has never been found.
- August 24 – United Air Lines Flight 615, a Douglas DC-6B, crashed near Decoto (now Union City), California, while on final approach to Oakland, California; all 44 passengers and six crew members died.
- October 17 – Queen Charlotte Airlines Flight 102, a Consolidated PBY Catalina on a domestic flight in Canada from Kitimat to Vancouver, crashed into Mount Benson. All 23 on board were killed.
- November 15 – In the 1951 LOT Lisunov Li-2 crash, a LOT Polish Airlines Lisunov Li-2 struck power lines and crashed near Tuszyn shortly after takeoff from Łódź due to engine failure, killing all 16 passengers and crew.
- December 16 – A Miami Airlines Curtiss C-46 Commando crashed at Elizabeth, New Jersey, because of loss of control following an engine fire, killing all 58 passengers and crew.
- December 22 – A Misrair SNCASE Languedoc crashed west of Tehran in a snowstorm, killing all 20 people on board.
- December 29 – Continental Charters Flight 44-2, a Curtiss C-46, crashed into a ridge near Napoli, New York, while en route to Buffalo, New York; three crew members and 23 passengers died.

=== 1952 ===
- January 10 – An Aer Lingus C-47 crashed near Llyn Gwynant after encountering a mountain wave triggered by Snowdon massif, killing all 23 on board.
- January 19 – Northwest Orient Airlines Flight 324, a Douglas DC-4, crashed into the sea off Sandspit, Canada, after a failed go-around, killing 36 of the 43 people on board.
- January 22 – American Airlines Flight 6780, a Convair 240 on approach to Newark, New Jersey, crashed into dwellings in Elizabeth, New Jersey, killing 30 and leading to the Doolittle Commission recommendation for laws coordinating urban zoning to keep airport approach paths clear.
- February 11 – National Airlines Flight 101, a Douglas DC-6, crashed into an apartment building in Elizabeth, New Jersey, two minutes after departing Newark Airport, killing 33 people (including four residents of the building).
- March 3 – An Air France SNCASE Languedoc crashed on takeoff from Nice, France, because of jammed controls. All 38 people on board were killed.
- March 22 – KLM Flight 592, a Douglas DC-6, crashed for reasons unknown on approach to Frankfurt, Germany, killing 45 of 47 on board.
- April 9 – Japan Air Lines Flight 301, a Martin 2-0-2 leased from Northwest Airlines and named Mokusei, struck the side of Mount Mihara, killing all 37 on board; the cause was not determined, but a navigation error was blamed.
- April 11 – Pan Am Flight 526A, a Douglas DC-4, ditched in the Atlantic 11 miles (18 km) north of San Juan, Puerto Rico, following double engine failure; 52 of 69 on board died.

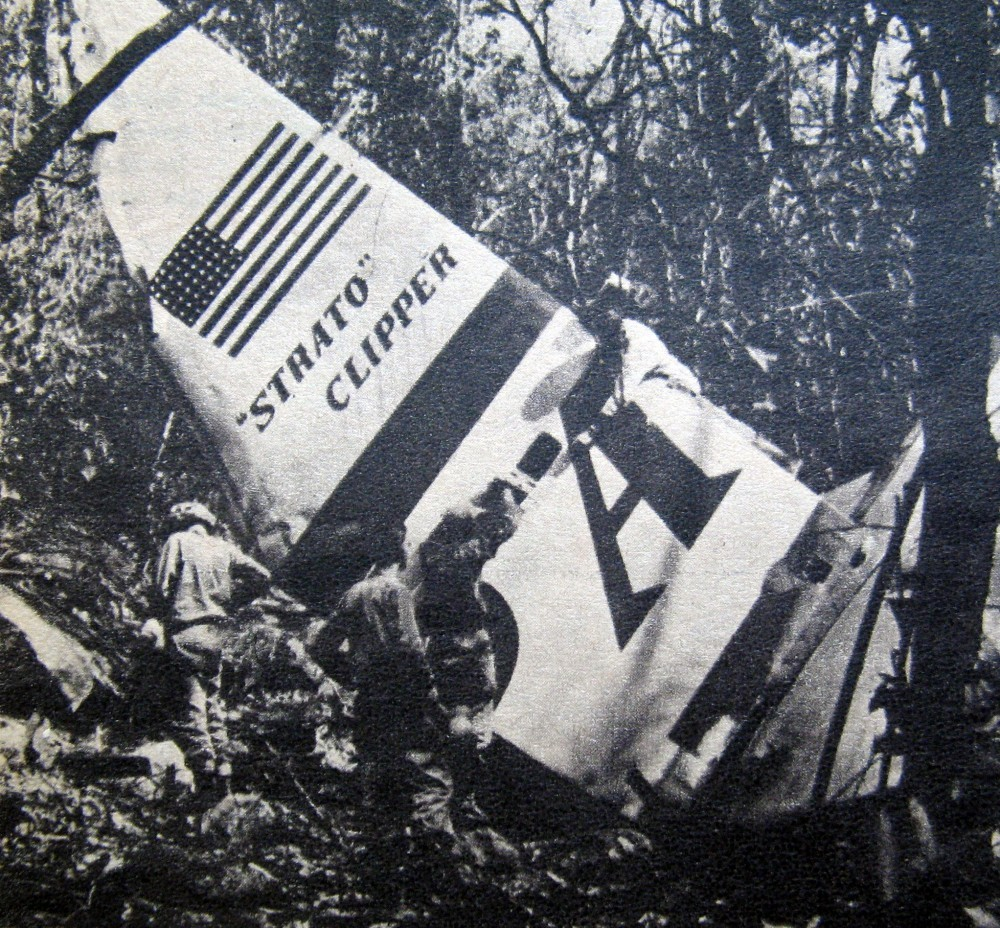
The wreckage of Pan American Flight 202

- April 29 – Pan Am Flight 202, a Boeing 377 Stratocruiser, broke up in mid-air and crashed after a possible engine separation in a remote area of Brazil on its way from Buenos Aires, Argentina, to New York City via Rio de Janeiro; all 50 on board were killed in the deadliest accident involving the Boeing 377.
- June 28 – American Airlines Flight 910, a Douglas DC-6 carrying 55 passengers and five crew, collided with a Temco Swift private plane on final approach to Dallas Love Field; the Swift crashed, killing both occupants, while the DC-6 landed safely with no injuries to the passengers or crew.
- August 12 – A Transportes Aéreos Nacional Douglas C-47A crashed on a domestic flight in Brazil following an in-flight fire; all 24 on board died.
- October 26 – BOAC Flight 115, a de Havilland Comet, overshot the runway on takeoff from Rome Ciampino Airport due to an excessive nose-up input. The aircraft was destroyed but all on board survived.
- December 6 – A Cubana de Aviación Douglas DC-4 stalled and crashed into the Atlantic Ocean off Bermuda shortly after takeoff from Kindley Air Force Base, killing 37 of 41 on board.

=== 1953 ===
- January 5 – In the 1953 Nutts Corner BEA Vickers Viking accident, a Vickers Viking operated by British European Airways crashed on approach to Nutts Corner, Belfast, Northern Ireland, killing 27 of the 31 on board.
- January 7 – Associated Air Transport Flight 1-6-6A, a Curtiss C-46F Commando, crashed in a ravine because of wing icing and severe turbulence, killing all 40 passengers and crew.
- February 2 – In the 1953 Skyways Avro York disappearance, a plane with 39 on board disappeared over the North Atlantic.
- February 14 – National Airlines Flight 470, a Douglas DC-6 en route from Tampa, Florida, to New Orleans, Louisiana, broke up in mid-air and crashed into the Gulf of Mexico after encountering severe turbulence, killing all 46 on board.
- March 20 – Transocean Air Lines Flight 942, a Douglas DC-4, crashed on approach to Oakland, California, killing all 35 occupants.
- April 20 – Western Air Lines Flight 636, a Douglas DC-6, crashed in San Francisco Bay, killing eight of the 10 occupants.
- April 30 – Aeroflot Flight 35, an Ilyushin Il-12, ditched in the Volga River, Russia, following a bird strike while landing. A passenger drowned while waiting for rescue, but the 22 others survived.
- May 2 – BOAC Flight 783, a de Havilland Comet, broke up in mid-air and crashed near Calcutta, India, after flying into a thunderstorm; all 43 on board died.
- May 17 – Delta Air Lines Flight 318, a Douglas DC-3, lost control and crashed after entering a downdraft, killing 19 and leaving one survivor.
- July 12 – Transocean Air Lines Flight 512, a Douglas DC-6A, crashed for reasons unknown in the Pacific Ocean while en route from Wake Island to Honolulu, Hawaii, killing all 58 on board.
- August 3 – Air France Flight 152, a Lockheed L-749A Constellation, ditched in the Mediterranean Sea following engine separation while en route from Rome to Beirut. Four elderly passengers drowned.
- September 1 – Air France Flight 178, a Lockheed L-749 Constellation, crashed into Mont Le Cimet in southern France; all 42 on board were killed.
- September 16 – American Airlines Flight 723, a Convair 240, crashed while on approach to Albany Airport; all 28 passengers and crew died.
- September 28 – Resort Airlines Flight 1081, a Curtiss C-46, stalled during a left turn and struck into the ground, killing 25 of the 41 on board.
- October 14 – A Sabena Convair 240 lost control and crashed shortly after takeoff from Frankfurt Airport following double engine failure, killing all 44 on board.
- October 29 – BCPA Flight 304, a Douglas DC-6B, crashed into King's Mountain, southeast of Half Moon Bay, California, on approach to San Francisco International Airport, killing all 19 on board, including American pianist William Kapell.

=== 1954 ===
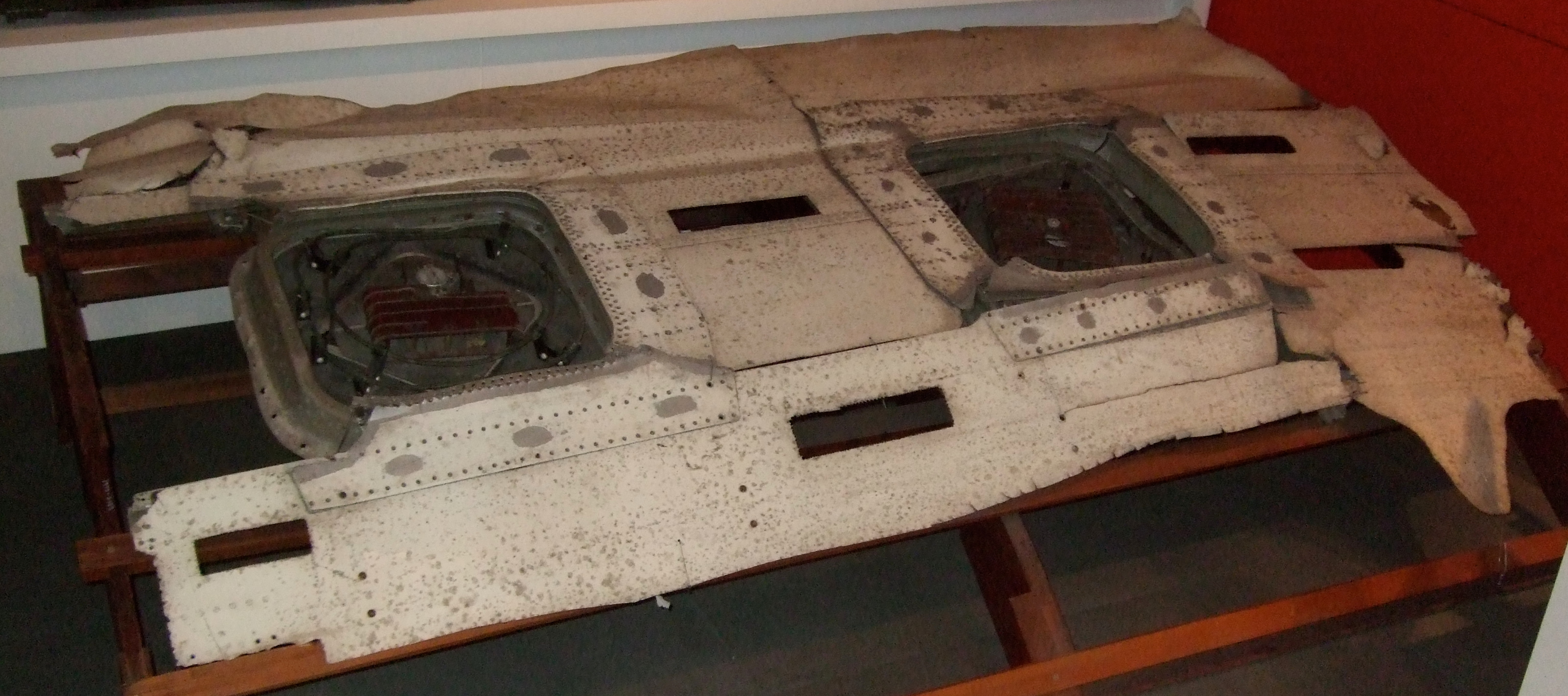
The roof fragment of BOAC Flight 781

- January 10 – BOAC Flight 781, a de Havilland Comet flying from Rome to London on the last leg of a flight from Singapore, broke up in mid-air because of metal fatigue in the fuselage and crashed in the Mediterranean Sea off Elba, killing all 35 on board.
- February 26 – Western Air Lines Flight 34, a Convair CV-240, crashed in Wyoming for undetermined reasons, killing all nine on board.
- March 13 – A BOAC Lockheed L-749A Constellation crashed as it attempted to land at Kallang Airport, Singapore; of the 40 passengers and crew, 33 were killed.
- April 8 – South African Airways Flight 201, a de Havilland Comet flying from Rome to Cairo bound for Johannesburg, broke up in mid-air and crashed in the Mediterranean between Naples and Stromboli, killing all 21 on board; as in BOAC Flight 781, the cause was metal fatigue at stress risers at the corners of the square windows in the aluminum skin.
- April 8 – Trans-Canada Air Lines Flight 9, a Canadair C-4 North Star, collided with an RCAF Harvard over Moose Jaw, Canada, killing all 37 on both aircraft.
- June 19 – In the 1954 Swissair Convair CV-240 crash, a Convair 240 ditched in the English Channel after running out of fuel. All survived the ditching, but three of the passengers drowned because of a lack of lifejackets.
- July 23 – A Cathay Pacific Douglas DC-4 was shot down by two PLAAF La-7 fighters and crashed off Hainan Island, China, killing 10 of 19 on board.
- August 23 – KLM Flight 608, a Douglas DC-6, crashed into the North Sea for reasons unknown, killing all 21 on board.
- September 5 – KLM Flight 633, a Lockheed L-1049 Super Constellation, ditched after takeoff from Shannon Airport in Ireland after the landing gear extended, killing 28 of 56 on board.
- September 27 – Aeroflot Flight 10, an Ilyushin Il-12, struck trees and crashed near Severny Airport in Russia, killing all 29 on board.
- November 30 – Northeast Airlines Flight 792, a Douglas DC-3 flying from Boston to Berlin, New Hampshire, crashed into mount Success during a snowstorm. Two of the seven people on board were killed.
- December 18 – Linee Aeree Italiane Flight 451, a Douglas DC-6, descended too low and crashed into a pier on approach to New York City, killing 26 of the 32 on board.
- December 25 – In the 1954 Prestwick air disaster, a British Overseas Airways Corporation Boeing 377 Stratocruiser crashed on landing at Prestwick Airport, Scotland, because of pilot error, killing 28 of the 36 on board.

=== 1955 ===
- January 12 – TWA Flight 694, a Martin 2–0–2, collided with a privately owned Douglas DC-3 over Cincinnati, Ohio, killing all 15 on board both aircraft.
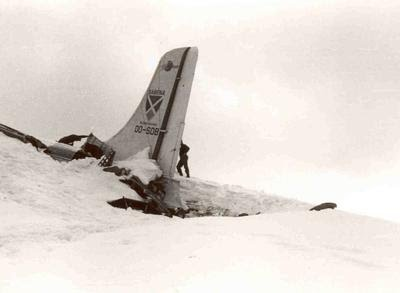
- Remains of Sabena Flight 503
  February 13 – Sabena Flight 503, a Douglas DC-6B, crashed into Monte Terminillo, Italy, in poor weather, killing all 29 on board.
- February 19 – TWA Flight 260, a Martin 4–0–4, crashed in the Sandia Mountains, near Albuquerque, New Mexico, following an unexplained deviation from the flight route, killing all 16 on board.
- March 20 – American Airlines Flight 711, a Convair 240, crashed into a field on approach to Springfield-Branson Regional Airport, Missouri, because of pilot error, killing 13 of 35 on board.
- March 26 – Pan Am Flight 845/26, a Boeing 377 Stratocruiser, ditched in the Pacific Ocean off the Oregon coast following engine separation, killing four of the 23 on board.
- April 4 – A United Air Lines Douglas DC-6 crashed after takeoff from Long Island MacArthur Airport during a training flight, because of pilot error, killing all three on board.
- April 11 – Air India Flight 300, a Lockheed L-749 Constellation named Kashmir Princess, crashed off the Natuna Islands, Indonesia, following a bomb explosion; 16 people were killed and three survived.
- May 18 – East African Airways Flight 104, a Douglas DC-3, struck the ridge of Mawenzi at 15,200 feet and exploded on impact, killing all 20 on board.
- July 27 – El Al Flight 402, a Lockheed L-049 Constellation, inadvertently strayed over Bulgarian territory on its way from Vienna to Tel Aviv and was shot down by two Bulgarian fighter aircraft, killing all 58 on board.
- August 4 – American Airlines Flight 476, a Convair CV-240, suffered an engine fire over Missouri. A wing broke off during an attempted emergency landing, in which all 30 on board died.
- October 6 – United Air Lines Flight 409, a Douglas DC-4, crashed into Medicine Bow Peak near Centennial, Wyoming, killing all 66 on board.

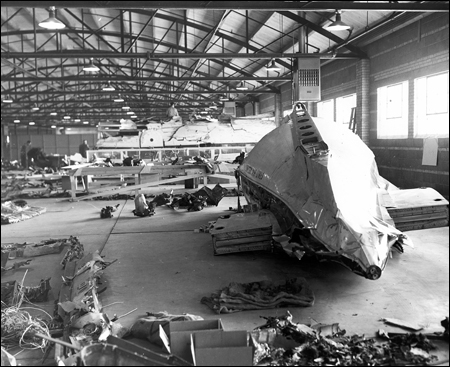
The wreckage of Flight 629 in a warehouse

- November 1 – United Air Lines Flight 629, a Douglas DC-6B, was blown up over Longmont, Colorado, by a bomb planted by Jack Gilbert Graham; all 44 on board were killed.

=== 1956 ===
- February 18 – In the Żurrieq Scottish Airlines crash, a Scottish Airlines Avro York crashed near Żurrieq, Malta, due to pilot error, killing all 50 on board.
- February 20 – A TAI Douglas DC-6 crashed on approach to Cairo, killing 52 people.
- April 1 – TWA Flight 400, a Martin 4–0–4, crashed on takeoff from Greater Pittsburgh International Airport, killing 22 of the 36 on board.
- April 2 – Northwest Orient Airlines Flight 2, a Boeing 377 Stratocruiser, ditched into Puget Sound after takeoff from Seattle–Tacoma International Airport after the cowl flaps were incorrectly set for takeoff; four passengers and a flight attendant died.
- June 20 – Linea Aeropostal Flight 253, a Lockheed L-1049 Constellation, crashed into the Atlantic Ocean off Asbury Park, New Jersey. All 74 passengers and crew were killed.
- June 24 – In the 1956 Kano Airport BOAC Argonaut crash, a Canadair C-4 Argonaut crashed shortly after taking off from Kano Airport, Nigeria, into a thunderstorm, killing 32 of the 38 passengers and three of the seven crew.

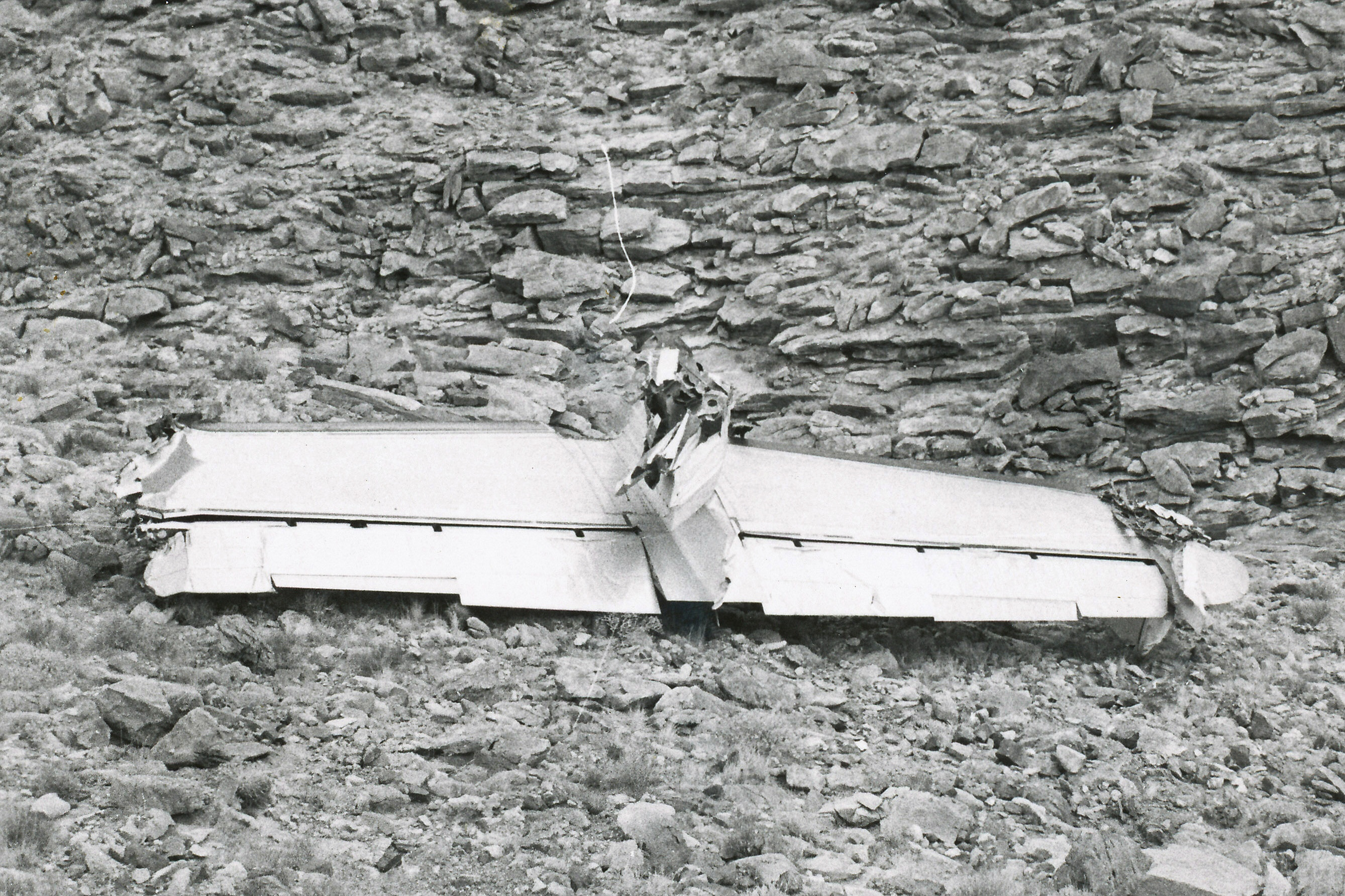
The severed tail of TWA Flight 2 after the 1956 Grand Canyon mid-air collision

- June 30 – In the 1956 Grand Canyon mid-air collision, United Airlines Flight 718, a DC-7, and TWA Flight 2, a Lockheed Constellation, collided over the Grand Canyon, killing all 128 on board both aircraft. The planes had been operating under Visual Flight Rules and failed to see each other; the Federal Aviation Administration was created in the aftermath.
- July 9 – Trans-Canada Air Lines Flight 304, a Vickers Viscount, shed a propeller blade over Flat Rock, Michigan; the blade penetrated the passenger cabin, killing one of 35 on board; this was the first known case of a turboprop shedding a blade in passenger service.
- July 13 – Malev Flight 387, a Lisunov Li-2, was hijacked by 7 passengers, who then took control and flew to West Germany. None of the 20 occupants died.
- July 15 – A Swissair Convair CV-440 entered a steep roll angle turn and crashed on approach, killing all 4 occupants.

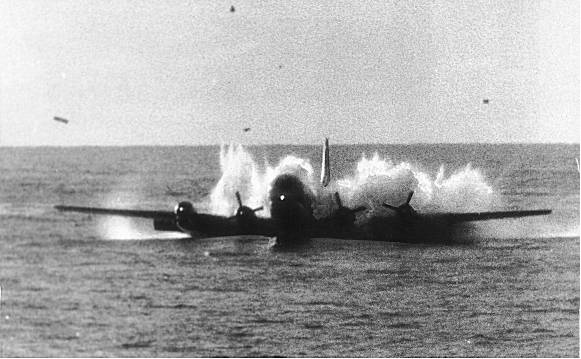
Pan Am Flight 6 ditches in the Pacific

- October 16 – Pan Am Flight 6, a Boeing 377 Stratocruiser, ditched in the Pacific Ocean between Hawaii and San Francisco following double engine failure; all 31 on board were rescued by a nearby United States Coast Guard ship.
- November 7 – Braathens SAFE Flight 253, a de Havilland Heron, crashed into Hummelfjell mountain near Tolga, Norway, killing two of 12 on board.
- November 24 – Linee Aeree Italiane Flight 451, a Douglas DC-6, lost altitude and crashed for undetermined reasons shortly after takeoff from Paris, killing 33 and leaving only two survivors.
- November 24 – ČSA Flight 548, an Ilyushin Il-12, suffered an engine failure on takeoff from Zurich and crashed while attempting to return, killing all 23 on board.
- November 27 – Linea Aeropostal Flight 253, a Lockheed L-749 Constellation, crashed on approach to Caracas International Airport, killing all 25 on board.
- December 9 – Trans-Canada Air Lines Flight 810-9, a Canadair North Star, crashed near Hope, British Columbia, Canada, killing all 62 people on board; the wreckage was located several months later. On board were four members of the Canadian Football League Saskatchewan Roughriders, and former Iowa Hawkeye Outland Trophy winner Cal Jones.

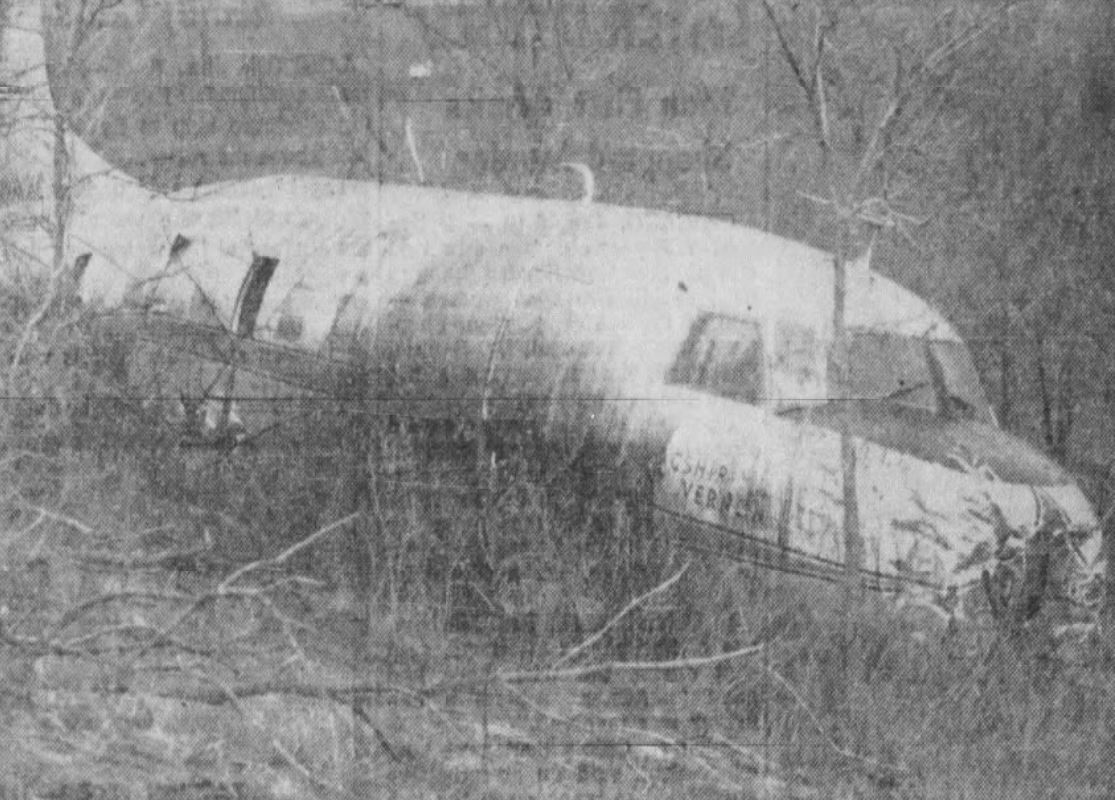
The wreckage of the American Airlines Flight 327 on the day after the crash

=== 1957 ===
- January 6 – American Airlines Flight 327, a Convair CV-240, flew into the ground on approach to Tulsa, killing one.
- January 31 – In the 1957 Pacoima mid-air collision, a Douglas Aircraft Company DC-7 collided with a US Air Force F-89 Scorpion. The DC-7 disintegrated and crashed into a schoolyard killing all four crew on board and three students on the ground. The Scorpion crashed in the mountains, killing the pilot.
- February 1 – Northeast Airlines Flight 823, a Douglas DC-6, crashed during a snowstorm shortly after takeoff from LaGuardia Airport, New York; 20 of the 101 occupants died
- March 14 – British European Airways Flight 411, a Vickers Viscount, crashed while on approach to Manchester Airport, killing all 20 on board and two on the ground.
- May 1 – In the 1957 Blackbushe Viking accident, an Eagle Aviation Vickers VC.1 Viking crashed after engine failure at Blackbushe Airport; of the 35 on board, only a passenger survived.
- May 9 – Aviaco Flight 111, a Bristol 170, crashed on approach to Madrid after a flight from Santiago de Compostela. All 37 people on board were killed.
- June 14 – LOT Polish Airlines Flight 232, an Ilyushin Il-14, crashed during approach to Vnukovo Airport, killing nine of the 13 passengers and crew on board.
- July 16 – KLM Flight 844, a Lockheed Super Constellation, crashed after takeoff from Biak-Mokmer Airport, Indonesia, killing 58 of 68 on board.
- August 11 – Maritime Central Airways Flight 315, a Douglas DC-4, crashed near Issoudun, Quebec, Canada, after encountering turbulence in a thunderstorm, killing all 79 passengers and crew on board.
- August 16 – Varig Flight 850, a Lockheed Super Constellation, ditched in the Atlantic after three engines detached, killing one.
- August 17 – In the 1957 Kiev mid-air collision, two Ilyushin Il-14s collided over Kiev, Ukraine, killing all nine on board both aircraft; six people on the ground also died.
- September 15 – Northeast Airlines Flight 285, a Douglas DC-3, crashed on approach to New Bedford Regional Airport, Massachusetts, following a premature descent due to pilot error, killing 12 of 24 on board.
- October 23 – A British European Airways Vickers Viscount 802 crashed during go-around, killing all 7 occupants.
- November 6 – A prototype Bristol Britannia aircraft crashed in woods near Overndale Road in Downend on its landing approach at Filton airport during a test flight. All fifteen on board perished
- November 8 – Pan Am Flight 7, a Boeing 377 Stratocruiser, disappeared between San Francisco and Honolulu; small pieces of wreckage and human remains were found almost a week later by the United States Navy; all 44 on board were believed to have been killed.
- November 15 – In the 1957 Aquila Airways Solent crash, a flying boat crashed near Chessell, Isle of Wight, UK, due to engine failure, killing 45 of 58 on board.
- December 8 – Aerolíneas Argentinas Flight 670, a Douglas DC-4, broke up in mid-air due to severe turbulence, killing all 61 on board.

=== 1958 ===
- January 15 – A Channel Airways de Havilland DH.104 Dove crashed near Dungeness, United Kingdom. All seven on board survived, with one injured.
- February 6 – In the Munich air disaster, a British European Airways Airspeed Ambassador operating as Flight 609 crashed while attempting a take off in a snowstorm from Munich-Riem Airport, killing 23 of 44 passengers and crew members on board including eight Manchester United footballers.
- February 19 – KLM Flight 543, a Douglas DC-6 crashed during approach to Cairo, killing 1 of 20 passengers and crew members on board.
- February 27 – In the Winter Hill air disaster, a Silver City Airways Bristol 170 Freighter travelling from the Isle of Man to Manchester Ringway Airport crashed into Winter Hill, Lancashire, killing 35 people and injuring seven.
- April 6 – Capital Airlines Flight 67, a Vickers 745D Viscount, crashed at Tri-City Airport (now MBS International Airport) near Freeland, Michigan, killing all 47 passengers and crew; an undiscovered ice buildup on the wing and windy conditions were possible causes.
- April 21 – United Airlines Flight 736, a Douglas DC-7, collided with a US Air Force F-100 Super Sabre fighter on a training mission near Las Vegas. All 47 on board the airliner and both F-100 crew members were killed.

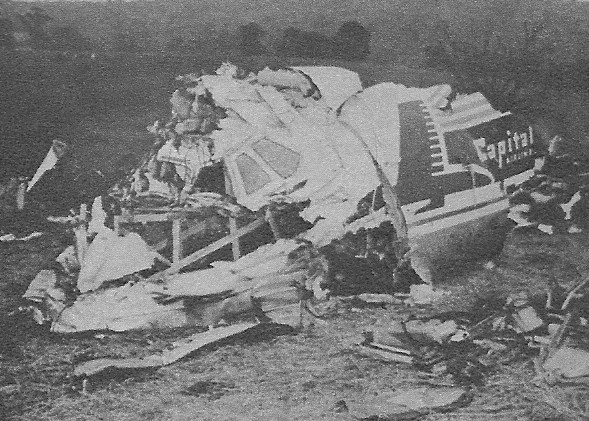
The nose section of Capital Airlines Flight 300

- May 18 – A Sabena Douglas DC-7 crashed southwest of Casablanca, Morocco, during a flight from Leopoldville to Brussels; 65 of the 69 people on board were killed.
- May 20 – Capital Airlines Flight 300, a Vickers Viscount, collided with a USAF T-33, killing all 13 on board the Viscount and one of two on board the T-33; the T-33's pilot parachuted to the ground and survived.
- May 25 – An Avro York 685 cargo aircraft crashed during a forced landing after an engine caught fire en route from Karachi to Delhi, killing four of the five people on board.
- June 2 – Aeronaves de México Flight 111, a Lockheed Constellation, hit a mountain shortly after takeoff from Guadalajara, Mexico, killing all 46 on board.
- June 16 – Serviços Aéreos Cruzeiro do Sul Flight 412, a Convair CV-440, crashed while on approach to Curitiba Airport, Brazil, killing 21 of the 26 on board.
- August 9 – Central African Airways Flight 890, a Vickers Viscount, crashed due to pilot error near Benina International Airport, Libya. Of the 54 on board, 36 were killed.
- August 14 – KLM Flight 607-E, a Lockheed L-1049 Super Constellation (named Hugo de Groot) en route from Amsterdam to New York, crashed in the Atlantic Ocean shortly after takeoff from Shannon Airport in Ireland, killing all 99 passengers and crew, including six members of the Egyptian fencing team.
- August 15 – Aeroflot Flight 04, a Tupolev Tu-104, crashed after stalling in an updraft, killing all 64 people on board.
- August 15 – Northeast Airlines Flight 258, a Convair 240, crashed near Nantucket International Airport due to pilot error, killing 25 of 34 on board.
- September 2 – An Independent Air Travel Vickers VC.1 Viking crashed near Southall, Middlesex, killing all three crew on board and another four people on the ground.
- September 5 – Aeroflot Flight 365, an Avia 14P, was hijacked in mid-air by a passenger who demanded to talk to the pilot. The aircraft landed at Jõhvi, USSR, in flames after the hijacker's bomb started a fire; all 17 on board escaped the burning aircraft except the hijacker, who died when the aircraft burned out.
- September 5 – Lóide Aéreo Nacional Flight 652, a Curtiss C-46 Commando, crashed near Campina Grande Airport, Brazil, due to pilot error, killing 13 of the 40 on board.
- October 17 – An Aeroflot Tupolev Tu-104 crashed near Kanash, Russia, due to a loss of control after encountering severe turbulence, killing all 80 on board.
- October 22 – British European Airways Flight 142, a Vickers Viscount, collided with an Italian Air Force North American F-86 Sabre over Italy; all 31 on board the Viscount died, but the Italian F-86 pilot survived.
- November 3 – A Yemen Airlines Douglas C-47, flying from Rome to Belgrade, crashed near Poggiodomo, Italy. All eight people on board were killed.
- December 4 – An Aviaco SNCASE Languedoc crashed in the Guadarrama Mountains, Spain, killing all 21 people on board.
- December 24 – A BOAC Bristol Britannia crashed near Christchurch, Dorset, England, killing nine of 12 on board.

=== 1959 ===
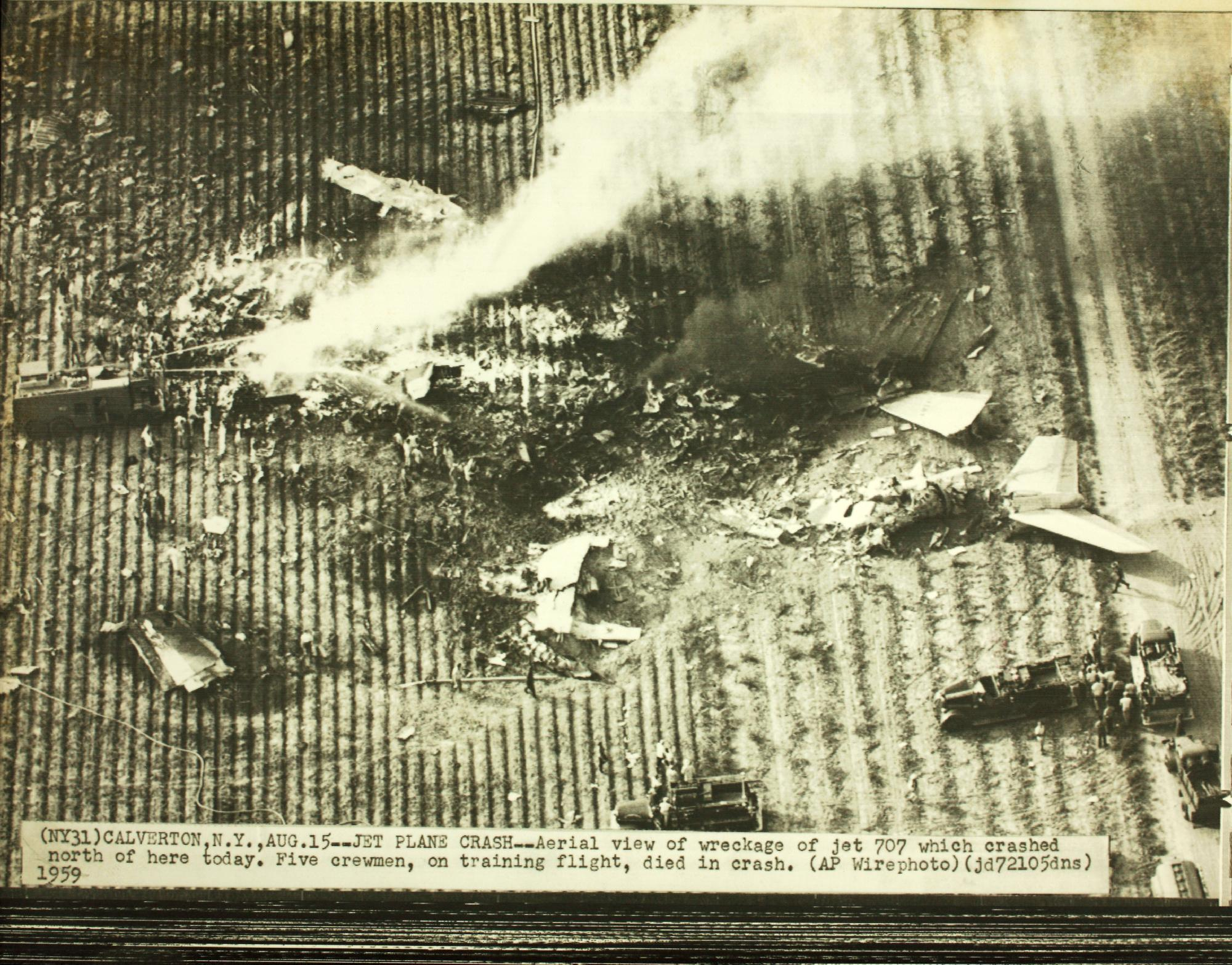
Remains of American Flight 514

- January 8 – Southeast Airlines Flight 308, a Douglas DC-3A, crashed into the Holston Mountain range, Tennessee, on approach to the Tri-Cities Regional Airport, killing all 10 people on board.
- January 11 – Lufthansa Flight 502, a Lockheed L-1049 Super Constellation, crashed on approach to Rio de Janeiro–Galeão International Airport, Brazil; 36 of the 39 on board were killed.
- January 16 – Austral Líneas Aéreas Flight 205, a Curtiss C-46 Commando, crashed after a missed approach to Mar Del Plata Airport in Argentina, killing 51 of the 52 people on board.
- February 3 – American Airlines Flight 320, a Lockheed L-188 Super Electra, crashed into the East River, New York City, as a result of pilot error; 65 passengers and crew were killed.
- February 3 – Pan Am Flight 115, a Boeing 707 with 119 people on board, experienced an unplanned emergency descent from 35,000 ft to 6,000 ft (10670 m to 1830 m). The crew managed to regain control and make an emergency landing in Gander, Canada.
- February 17 – In the 1959 Turkish Airlines Gatwick crash, a chartered Vickers Viscount 793 carrying the Turkish prime minister and other government officials crashed in heavy fog during its final approach into London Gatwick Airport; five of the eight crew and nine of the 16 passengers died in the accident; Prime Minister Adnan Menderes was among the 10 survivors.
- April 23 – In the 1959 Air Charter Turkey crash, an Avro Super Trader IV crashed on Mount Süphan, Turkey; all 12 crew on board died.
- May 12 – Capital Airlines Flight 75, a Vickers Viscount 745D flying from New York City to Atlanta, broke up in flight over Chase, Maryland, due to loss of control in severe turbulence; all 31 on board were killed.
- June 22 – Pan Am Clipper Panama, a Douglas DC-6, caught fire after a propeller separated on takeoff. The aircraft was destroyed but everyone survived.
- June 26 – TWA Flight 891, a Lockheed Starliner, broke up in mid-air and crashed near Marnate, Italy, after it was struck by lightning; all 68 passengers and crew on board were killed.
- August 15 – American Airlines Flight 514, a Boeing 707, crashed near Calverton-Peconic River Airport, New York, after a loss of control. All five crew members were killed in the first crash involving a Boeing 707.
- August 19 – A Transair Douglas Dakota crashed into a mountain in Spain, killing all 32 on board.
- September 24 – TAI Flight 307, a Douglas DC-7, crashed into a pine forest on departure from Mérignac Airport, France; 54 of the 65 people on board were killed.
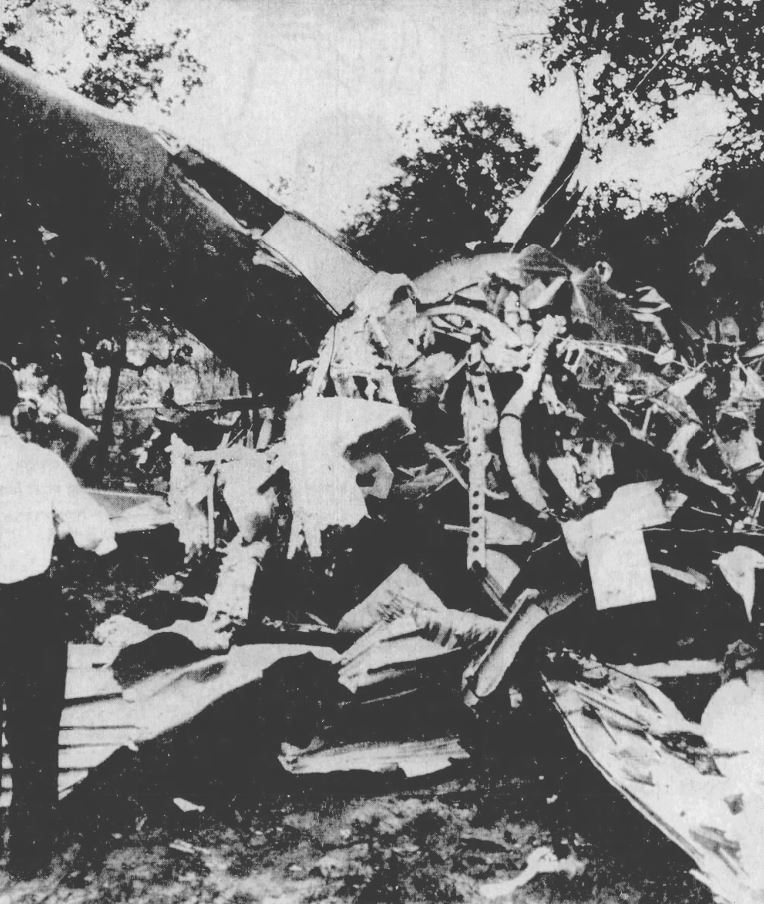
  Remains of Braniff International Airways Flight 542
- September 29 – Braniff Flight 542, a Lockheed L-188 Electra, broke up in mid-air and crashed 4 miles (6.4 km) from Buffalo, Texas; all 34 on board died.
- October 19 – A Boeing 707-227 crashed during a test flight before being delivered to Braniff International Airlines due to excessive Dutch rolls which caused three engines to be detached. The plane crash-landed at Stillaguamish River, killing 4 crew of the 8 on board.
- October 23 – Aeroflot Flight 200, an Ilyushin Il-14, struck trees on approach to Vnukovo, killing 28 and leaving one survivor.
- October 30 – Piedmont Airlines Flight 349, a Douglas DC-3, crashed on Bucks Elbow Mountain near Charlottesville, Virginia, killing the crew of three and 23 of 24 passengers; the sole survivor was seriously injured; the cause was a navigational error during an Instrument Landing System approach.
- November 16 – National Airlines Flight 967, a Douglas DC-7B, exploded in mid-air for reasons unknown and crashed into the Gulf of Mexico while on a flight from Tampa, Florida, to New Orleans, Louisiana; all 40 on board died.
- November 16 – Aeroflot Flight 315, an Antonov An-10, entered a nosedive due to tail icing and crashed on approach to Lviv Airport, Ukraine, killing all 40 on board.
- November 21 – Ariana Afghan Airlines Flight 202, a Douglas DC-4, crashed into a hillside near Beirut shortly after takeoff, killing 24 of 27 on board.
- November 24 – TWA Flight 595, a Lockheed L-1049H, banked excessively exceeding 45 degrees during the final approach due to pilot error, which sank rapidly. It crashed into a residential area, killing all 3 on board and on the ground
- December 1 – Allegheny Airlines Flight 371, a Martin 2–0–2, crashed on approach into Williamsport Regional Airport, Pennsylvania. Only one passenger survived out of the 26 passengers and crew on board.
- December 22 – VASP Flight 233, a Vickers Viscount, collided with a Brazilian Air Force Fokker S-11 over Brazil; all 32 on board the Viscount died, alongside 10 other on the ground, but the Brazilian S-11 pilot survived.

== 1960s ==
=== 1960 ===
- January 6 – National Airlines Flight 2511, a Douglas DC-6B bound from New York to Miami, exploded in mid-air and crashed near Bolivia, North Carolina, following a possible bomb explosion; all 34 people on board were killed.
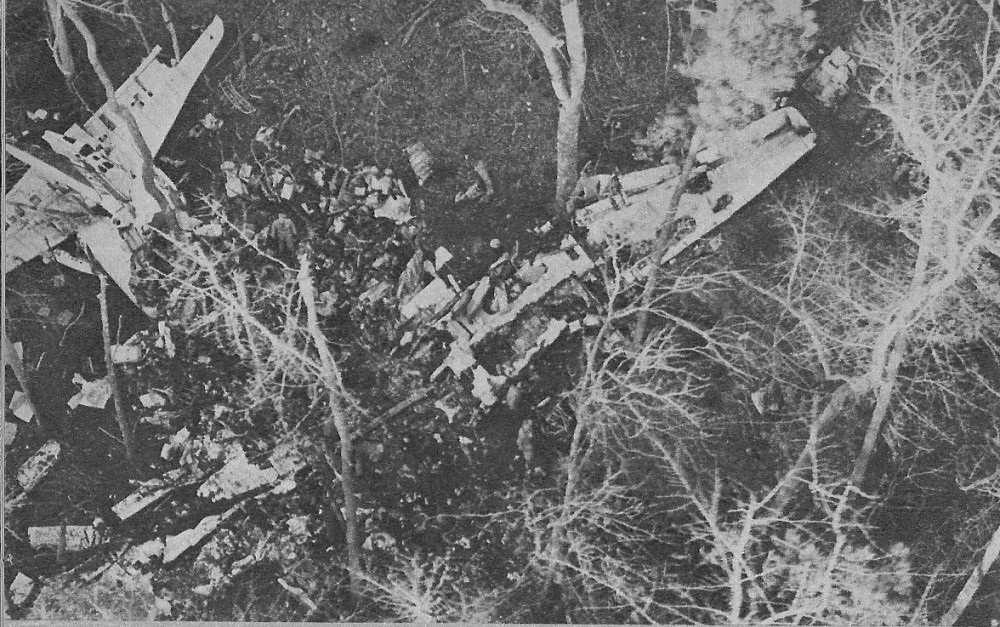
  Remains of Capital Airlines Flight 20
- January 18 – Capital Airlines Flight 20, a Vickers Viscount en route from Washington National Airport to Norfolk International Airport, crashed near Holdcroft, Virginia, due to engine failure caused by icing; all 50 on board were killed.
- January 19 – Scandinavian Airlines System Flight 871, a Sud Aviation Caravelle, crashed while on approach to Esenboğa Airport, Ankara, Turkey, following an unexplained descent, killing all 42 on board in the first fatal crash of the Caravelle.
- January 21 – Avianca Flight 671, a Lockheed L-1049E Constellation, crashed on landing at Sangster International Airport, Montego Bay, Jamaica, following a heavy landing, killing two of the seven crew and 35 of 39 passengers on board (including the Spanish bullfighter Manuel Jiménez Díaz) in Jamaica's worst aviation accident.
- February 5 – In the 1960 Douglas DC-4 Cochabamba crash, a domestic flight in Bolivia from Cochabamba to La Paz crashed shortly after takeoff following an apparent engine fire, killing all 59 on board; a technical defect was blamed.
- February 25 – The 1960 Rio de Janeiro mid-air collision: A United States Navy Douglas R6D-1 (DC-6A) collided with Real Transportes Aéreos Flight 753, a Douglas DC-3, over Rio de Janeiro, Brazil; of the 64 people on board both aircraft, only three survived, all from the R6D-1.
- February 26 – Aeroflot Flight 315, an Antonov An-10A, crashed short of the runway at Lviv Airport, Ukraine, due to tail icing; of the 33 on board, only a passenger survived.
- February 26 – Alitalia Flight 618, a Douglas DC-7C, crashed for reasons unknown shortly after takeoff from Shannon Airport, Ireland, killing 34 of 52 on board.
- March 17 – Northwest Orient Airlines Flight 710, a Lockheed L-188 Super Electra en route from Chicago to Miami, Florida, broke up in mid-air at 15,000 feet (4,600 m) and crashed near Tell City, Indiana, killing all 63 on board.
- June 10 – Trans Australia Airlines Flight 538, a Fokker F-27, crashed into the ocean near Mackay, Queensland, Australia, for reasons unknown, killing all 29 on board in Australia's worst civilian air disaster. This crash was responsible for the mandatory installation of cockpit voice recorders in airliners in Australia.
- June 10 – Aeroflot Flight 207, an Ilyushin Il-14, crashed into a mountain near Tkvarcheli, Georgia, after the crew deviated from the flight route; all 31 on board died.
- June 24 - Real Transportes Aéreos Flight 435, a Convair 340, crashed into the sea near Rio de Janeiro, killing all 54 on board.
- July 14 – Northwest Orient Airlines Flight 1-11, a Douglas DC-7C, ditched off Polillo Island, Philippines, following an engine failure and in-flight fire; one passenger was killed when the number-two propeller slashed through the fuselage.
- July 19 – Trans Australia Airlines Flight 408, a Lockheed L-188 Electra, was hijacked by Alex Hildebrandt, who was armed with a sawn-off .22 long rifle and a bomb. The crew and Alex got into a fight where the hijacker was under control. All 49 occupants survived in Australia's first aircraft hijacking.
- July 21 – Aeroflot Flight 414, an Ilyushin Il-12, crashed after taking off too soon, killing 7 of the 28 on board and 1 one the ground
- July 27 – Chicago Helicopter Airways Flight 698, a Sikorsky S-58, crashed in Illinois after suffering a main rotor failure, killing all 13 on board.
- August 17 – Aeroflot Flight 36, an Ilyushin Il-18, crashed near Tarasovich, Ukraine, following an engine fire, killing all 34 on board.
- August 29 – Air France Flight 343, a Lockheed L-1049G Super Constellation, crashed in the Atlantic Ocean off Dakar, Senegal, for reasons unknown following an aborted landing, killing all 63 on board.
- September 19 – World Airways Flight 830, a Douglas DC-6, struck Mount Barrigada, Guam, due to pilot error, killing 80 of 94 on board.
- September 26 – Austrian Airlines Flight 901, a Vickers Viscount, crashed short of runway 07 at Sheremetyevo International Airport, Soviet Union; 31 of the 37 passengers and crew on board were killed.
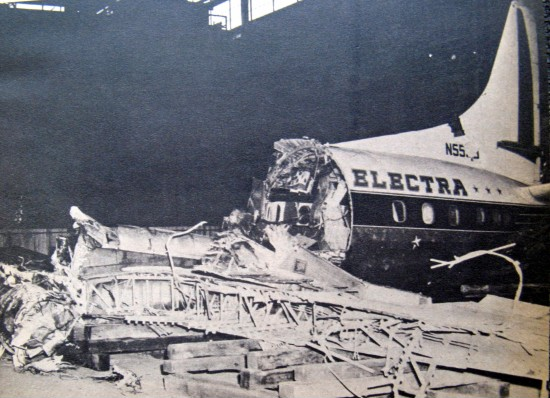
- Wreckage of Eastern Air Lines Flight 375
  October 4 – Eastern Air Lines Flight 375, a Lockheed L-188 Super Electra, crashed on takeoff from Boston's Logan International Airport after multiple bird strikes; 62 of 72 on board died.
- October 14 – Itavia Flight 115, a de Havilland Heron, crashed into the slope of Mount Capanne in adverse weather, killing all 11 on board.
- October 29 – The Cal Poly football team plane crash: a chartered Curtiss C-46 crashed into Winthrop Bay on takeoff from the Toledo Express Airport in Toledo, Ohio, killing 22 people including 16 players from the California Polytechnic State University football team.
- November 23 – Philippine Air Lines Flight S26, a Douglas DC-3C, struck the slope of Mount Baco due to a possible navigation error; all 33 on board died.

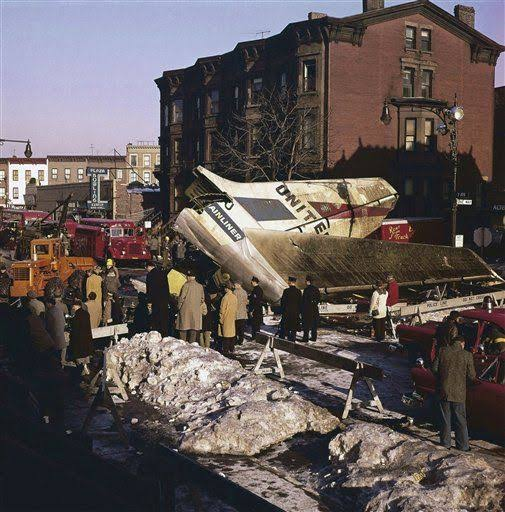
The tail section of United Flight 826 lying amid buildings after the New-York mid-air collision

- December 16 – The 1960 New York mid-air collision: United Airlines Flight 826, a Douglas DC-8, and TWA Flight 266, a Lockheed Super Constellation, collided in mid-air over Staten Island in New York; all 128 on board the two planes and six people on the ground were killed. This was the first crash in which a flight recorder was used to provide details in a crash investigation. The accident was the deadliest aviation disaster in history at the time.
- December 22 – Philippine Airlines Flight S85, a Douglas DC-3C, crashed shortly after takeoff due to loss of control following engine failure, killing 28 of 37 on board.

=== 1961 ===
- January 3 – Aero Flight 311, a Douglas DC-3, crashed into woods near Kvevlax, Finland, due to pilot error, killing all 25 on board. Both pilots were drunk.
- January 19 – Aeronaves de México Flight 401, a Douglas DC-8, overshot the runway on takeoff in New York City, killing four out of the 106 occupants.
- January 24 – Garuda Indonesian Airways Flight 424, a Douglas DC-3, hit a mountain near Bandung, Indonesia, killing all 21 on board.
- January 28 – American Airlines Flight 1502, a Boeing 707, crashed into the sea off Montauk Point, New York, during a training flight following a loss of control. All six crew members on board were killed.
- February 3 – Garuda Indonesian Airways Flight 542, a Douglas DC-3, disappeared off Madura Island, Indonesia, with 26 on board.

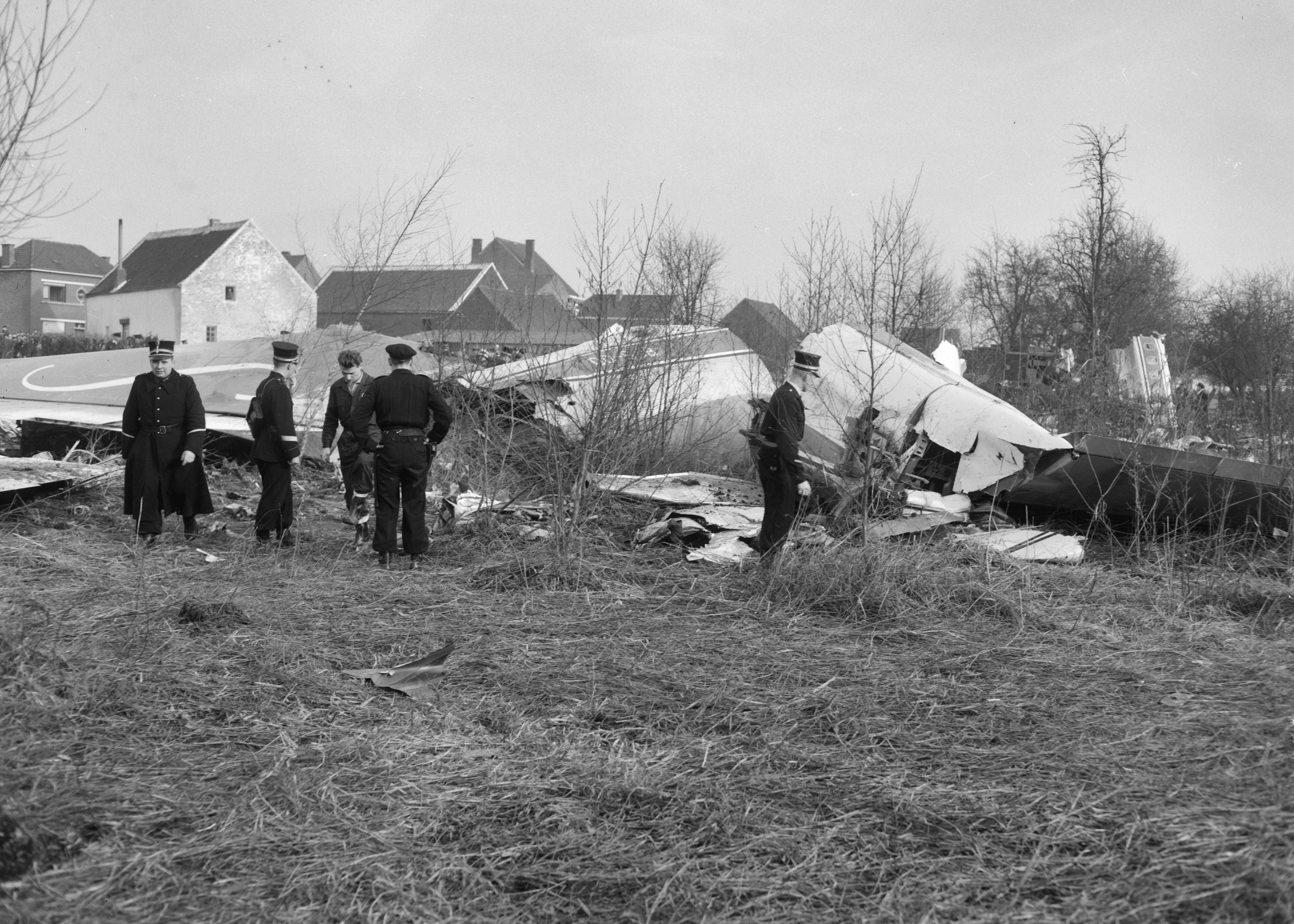
Crash site and debris of Sabena Flight 548

- February 15 – Sabena Flight 548, a Boeing 707, crashed on approach in Brussels, Belgium, killing 73, including the entire United States figure skating team; a runaway stabilizer was thought to have been the cause of the first fatal accident involving a 707 in regular passenger service.
- March 16 – Aeroflot Flight 068, a Tupolev Tu-104, crashed shortly after takeoff from Koltsovo Airport following engine failure, killing five of 51 on board; two people on the ground also died when the aircraft hit a house.
- March 28 – ČSA Flight 511, an Ilyushin Il-18, broke up and crashed at Gräfenberg, West Germany. All 52 passengers and crew on board were killed.
- April 3 – LAN-Chile Flight 621, a Douglas DC-3, crashed in the Andes for reasons unknown, killing all 24 on board including footballers and coaching staff from the CD Green Cross Chilean football team. The fuselage was found in 2015.
- May 10 – Air France Flight 406, a Lockheed Starliner, broke up in mid-air and crashed into the Sahara Desert near the Edjele oilfield in Algeria following a possible bomb explosion, killing all 78 on board.
- May 30 – Viasa Flight 897, a Douglas DC-8, crashed shortly after taking off from Lisbon Portela Airport. All 61 passengers and crew on board were killed.
- June 12 – KLM Flight 823, a Lockheed L-188 Electra, crashed while on approach to Cairo International Airport due to pilot error; 20 of 36 on board died.
- June 22 – An Aeroflot Ilyushin Il-18 crash-landed near Bogoroditsk after an engine fire. All 97 on board survived.
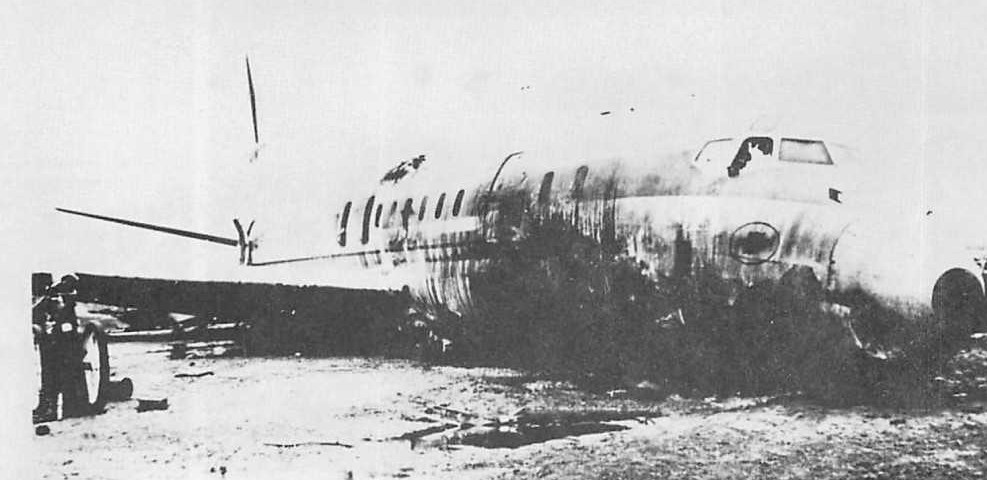
- Wreckage of United Air Lines Flight 859
  July 11 – United Airlines Flight 859, a Douglas DC-8, crashed on landing at Stapleton International Airport in Denver, Colorado, killing 17 passengers and one person on the ground.
- July 12 – ČSA Flight 511, an Ilyushin Il-18, crashed at Anfa Airport, Morocco, for reasons unknown, killing all 72 on board.
- July 19 – Aerolíneas Argentinas Flight 644, a Douglas DC-6, broke up and crashed 12 miles (19 km) west of Pardo, Buenos Aires, Argentina, after encountering severe turbulence shortly after takeoff. All 67 passengers and crew on board were killed.
- July 21 – Alaska Airlines Flight 779, a Douglas DC-6A on a military contract flight, crashed short of the runway at Shemya Air Force Base, Alaska. All six crew members were killed.
- August 6 – In the 1961 Malév Hungarian Airlines Douglas C-47 Skytrain crash, a Malév Douglas C-47 crashed into an apartment building in Zugló, Budapest, during a sightseeing flight, due to pilot error, killing all 27 on board and three more on the ground; all those in the apartment building survived.
- August 9 – The Holtaheia Accident: An Eagle Airways Vickers VC.1 Viking crashed at Holta, Strand, Norway, killing all 39 on board, including 36 people from the Archbishop Lanfranc School.
- September 1 – TWA Flight 529, a Lockheed Constellation L-049 propliner, abruptly pitched up and crashed shortly after takeoff from Chicago's Midway Airport, killing all 73 passengers and five crew on board; a 5/16-inch bolt that had fallen out of the elevator control linkage just before the crash was blamed.
- September 10 – A President Airlines Douglas DC-6 crashed shortly after takeoff from Shannon Airport en route to Gander due to loss of control caused by possible pilot error, killing all 83 passengers and crew on board. The crash remains the worst in Ireland.
- September 12 – Air France Flight 2005, a Sud Aviation Caravelle, crashed on approach to Rabat–Salé Airport due to misread instruments, killing all 77 on board.
- September 17 – Northwest Orient Airlines Flight 706, a Lockheed L-188 Electra, crashed on takeoff from Chicago as a result of a maintenance error causing the ailerons to become detached from the control wheels; all 37 on board died.
- September 18 – In the 1961 Ndola Transair Sweden DC-6 crash, a Douglas DC-6B carrying Dag Hammarskjöld, second Secretary-General of the United Nations, crashed near Ndola, Northern Rhodesia, killing all 16 on board.
- September 23 – Turkish Airlines Flight 835, a Fokker F27 Friendship, crashed while on approach to Esenboğa Airport; of the 29 on board, only a passenger survived.
- October 7 – In the 1961 Derby Aviation crash, a Douglas Dakota crashed into the Canigou mountain in France en route to Perpignan from London, due to a navigation error, killing all 34 on board.
- November 8 – Imperial Airlines Flight 201/8, a Lockheed Constellation L-049, crashed on landing at Byrd Field near Richmond, Virginia; all 74 passengers – mostly new US Army recruits being flown to their base for training – died of carbon monoxide asphyxiation, along with three crew members; the captain and flight engineer survived by escaping the burning wreckage.
- November 23 – Aerolíneas Argentinas Flight 322, a de Havilland Comet, crashed at Campinas, Brazil, because of pilot error shortly after takeoff, killing all 52 on board.
- November 30 – Ansett-ANA Flight 325, a Vickers Viscount, crashed into Botany Bay, Australia, nine minutes after takeoff due to in-flight breakup in a thunderstorm, killing all 15 people on board. Australia would require all airliners to have weather radar by 1963.
- December 17 – Aeroflot Flight 245, an Ilyushin Il-18, entered a nosedive and crashed near Chebotovka, Russia, after the pilot deployed the flaps by mistake, killing all 59 on board.
- December 21 – British European Airways Flight 226, a de Havilland Comet, crashed after stalling shortly after takeoff; 27 of the 34 occupants were killed.

=== 1962 ===
- February 25 – An Avensa Fairchild F-27 crashed into San Juan mountain on Margarita Island in the Caribbean Sea, killing all 23 on board.
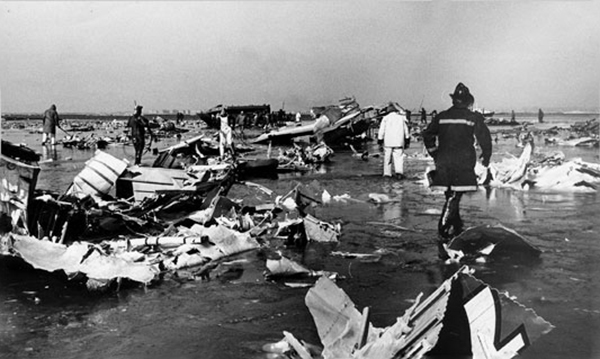
- Wreckage of American Airlines Flight 1
  March 1 – American Airlines Flight 1, a Boeing 707 destined for Los Angeles, California, United States, crashed in Jamaica Bay, Queens, New York, due to a rudder malfunction; all 95 passengers and crew on board were killed.
- March 4 – Caledonian Airways Flight 153, a Douglas DC-7 operating a non-scheduled multi-leg flight out of Luxembourg, crashed into a jungle swamp at Douala, Cameroon, for reasons unknown, killing all 111 on board.
- March 8 – A Turkish Airlines Fairchild F-27 crashed into the Bolkar Mountains while on approach to Turkey's Adana Airport, killing all 11 on board.
- March 16 – Flying Tiger Line Flight 739, a Lockheed L-1049 Super Constellation chartered by the United States military to transport 96 American soldiers to South Vietnam, disappeared over the western Pacific.
- May 6 – A Channel Airways Douglas C-47 Dakota crashed into a hill on the Isle of Wight in bad weather, while en route from Jersey to London's Southend Airport, killing 12 of the 18 on board.
- May 12 – An Eastern Provincial Airlines Canso flying boat sank at Godthåb Harbour, Greenland, killing 15 of the 21 on board.
- May 22 – Continental Airlines Flight 11, a Boeing 707 flying from Chicago, Illinois, to Kansas City, Missouri, broke up in mid-air near Unionville, Missouri, after a bomb brought on board by a passenger exploded in the lavatory, killing all 45 people on board.
- June 3 – Air France Flight 007, a chartered Boeing 707, caught fire after overshooting the runway on takeoff, killing all but two of the 132 passengers and crew on board; among the fatalities were many of the civic and cultural leaders of Atlanta, Georgia; it was the worst single-aircraft accident to that date.
- June 22 – Air France Flight 117, a Boeing 707 operating an international multi-leg flight from Paris, France, to Santiago, Chile, crashed into a forested hill on the island of Guadeloupe for reasons unknown, while approaching Pointe-à-Pitre International Airport; all 113 on board were killed.
- June 30 – Aeroflot Flight 902, a Tupolev Tu-104 operating a domestic flight in the Soviet Union, was shot down by a missile near Voznesenka, Krasnoyarsk Krai; all 84 people on board died in Russia's worst air accident to that date.
- July 7 – Alitalia Flight 771, a Douglas DC-8 operating a multi-leg flight between Sydney, Australia, and Rome, Italy, hit high terrain while descending near Junnar in India, due to navigation error; all 94 on board were killed.
- July 19 – United Arab Airlines Flight 869, a de Havilland Comet 4C operating an international scheduled flight from Hong Kong to Cairo, via Bangkok, crashed into Khao Yai mountain while descending to Bangkok; all 26 people on board lost their lives.
- July 22 – Canadian Pacific Air Lines Flight 301, a Bristol Britannia destined for Nadi, Fiji, crashed during an attempted "go-around" on a three-engined approach at Honolulu Airport, Hawaii, after experiencing engine problems shortly after takeoff; 27 of the 40 on board were killed.
- July 28 – Aeroflot Flight 415, an Antonov An-10 operating a domestic flight in the Soviet Union, crashed into a mountain near Sochi Airport due to ATC and crew errors; all 81 on board lost their lives.
- August 20 – Panair do Brasil Flight 026, a Douglas DC-8, failed to take off, resulting in it overrunning, after which it crashed into the Guanabara Bay in Brazil; 15 of the 105 on board lost their lives.
- September 3 – Aeroflot Flight 3, a Tupolev Tu-104 operating a domestic flight in the Soviet Union, crashed near Kuruna, Nanaysky District, due to an unexplained loss of control; all 86 on board were killed.
- September 18 – Aeroflot Flight 213, an Ilyushin Il-14 operating a domestic flight in the Soviet Union, crashed near Chersky Airport, Sakha Republic, after controlled flight into terrain caused by poor weather; all 32 people on board were killed.
- September 23 – Flying Tiger Line Flight 923, a Lockheed Super Constellation, ditched in the North Atlantic 800 kilometres west of Ireland after three engines failed, killing 28 of the 76 on board.
- November 23 – Malév Flight 355, an Ilyushin Il-18V, flying from Budapest to Paris via Frankfurt, stalled and crashed near Paris's Le Bourget Airport in Roissy-en-France, resulting in the deaths of all 21 people on board, due to suspected severe icing on the horizontal stabilizer caused by design flaws, although the official investigation never conclusively determined the exact cause.
- November 23 – United Airlines Flight 297, a Vickers Viscount 745D operating a multi-leg flight between the US states of New Jersey and Georgia, crashed near Ellicott City, Maryland, following a bird strike; all 17 people on board lost their lives.
- November 27 – Varig Flight 810, a Boeing 707-441 flying from Rio de Janeiro, Brazil, to Los Angeles, California, United States, crashed into a mountain near Lima airport in Peru, killing all 97 occupants.
- November 30 – Eastern Air Lines Flight 512, a Douglas DC-7B operating a domestic flight from Charlotte, North Carolina, United States, to New York City, crashed as a result of pilot error during a missed approach at New York's Idlewild Airport; 25 of the 51 on board were killed.

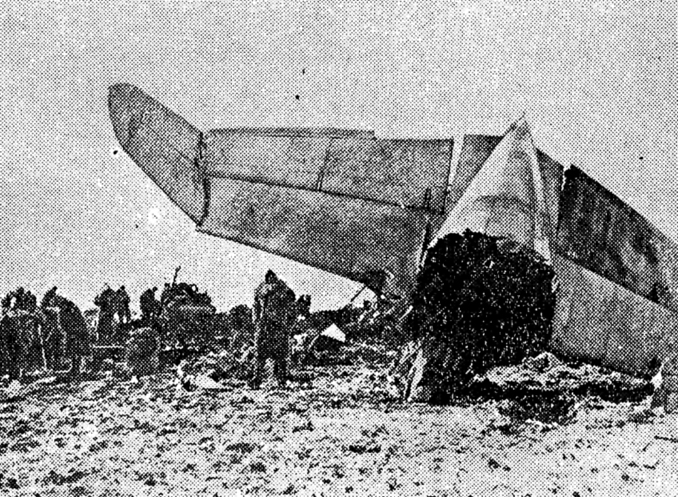
Wreckage of the crashed LOT Vickers Viscount

- December 19 – A LOT Vickers Viscount crashed on approach to Okęcie International Airport, Warsaw, Poland, due to loss of control; all 33 passengers and crew lost their lives.
- December 29 – An Air Nuatic Boeing 307 crashed into Monte Renoso mountain, killing all 25 occupants in the deadliest Boeing 307 crash.

=== 1963 ===
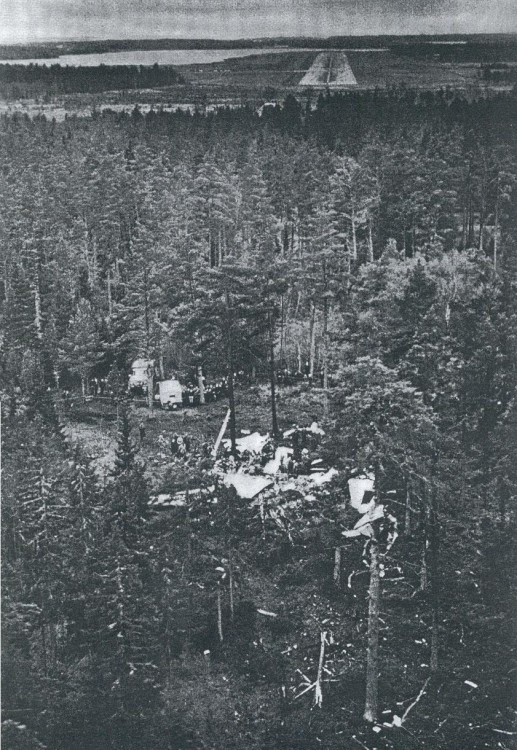
Aero Flight 217 (1963)

- February 1 – In the Ankara mid-air collision, Middle East Airlines Flight 265, a Vickers Viscount, collided with a Turkish Air Force Douglas C-47, killing all 17 on board both aircraft and 87 on the ground.
- February 12 – Northwest Orient Airlines Flight 705, a Boeing 720, broke up in turbulence associated with a severe thunderstorm and crashed into the Everglades; all 43 passengers and crew members on board were killed.
- March 2 – Philippine Airlines Flight 984, a Douglas C-47B, crashed on the slopes of Mount Boca after reported bad weather. All 27 on board died.
- March 5 – Aeroflot Flight 191, an Ilyushin Il-18, crashed on landing at Ashgabat International Airport due to a dust storm, killing 12 of 54 on board.
- March 30 – Itavia Flight 703, a Douglas C-47 flying from Pescara to Rome, crashed in the Appennine mountains. All eight people on board were killed.
- April 4 – Aeroflot Flight 25, an Ilyushin Il-18, crashed in Tatarstan after suffering an engine malfunction, killing all 67 people on board.
- June 3 – Northwest Airlines Flight 293, a Douglas DC-7C operating a military charter, crashed into the sea off Annette Island, Alaska, for reasons unknown. All 101 passengers and crew were killed.
- July 2 – Mohawk Airlines Flight 121, a Martin 4–0–4, crashed near Rochester, New York, while attempting takeoff, killing seven of the 43 people on board.
- July 3 – New Zealand National Airways Corporation Flight 441, a Douglas DC-3 en route from Whenuapai Airport, Auckland, to Tauranga, crashed into the Kaimai Ranges; all 23 on board died, making it the worst air disaster in mainland New Zealand to date.
- July 13 – Aeroflot Flight 012, a Tupolev Tu-104, crashed on approach to Irkutsk following a premature descent, killing 33 of 35 on board.
- July 28 – United Arab Airlines Flight 869, a de Havilland Comet 4C, crashed into the sea while on approach to Bombay Airport, India, killing all 63 on board.
- August 12 – Air Inter Flight 2611, a Vickers Viscount, crashed into a farmhouse near Lyon in poor weather conditions, killing 16 including one on the ground.
- August 21 – Aeroflot Flight 366, a Tupolev Tu-124, ditched in the Neva River in Leningrad after engine failure; there were no fatalities among the 52 on board, but the aircraft was destroyed.
- August 24 – Aeroflot Flight 663, an Avia 14P, crashed into a mountain near Gegechkori, Georgia, in bad weather after the pilot deviated from the flight route; all 32 on board died.
- September 4 – Swissair Flight 306, a Sud Aviation Caravelle, crashed near Dürrenäsch, Switzerland, due to an in-flight fire, killing all 80 on board.
- November 8 – Aero Flight 217, a Douglas DC-3, crashed in poor visibility near Mariehamn Airport, killing 22 out of 25 on board.
- November 29 – Trans-Canada Air Lines Flight 831, a Douglas DC-8, crashed shortly after takeoff from Montreal/Dorval Airport, killing all 118 people on board.

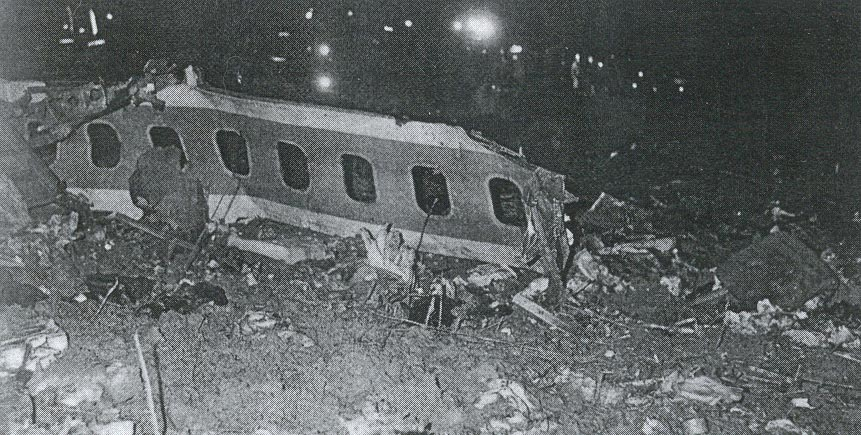
Fragment of Pan Am 214

- December 8 – Pan Am Flight 214, a Boeing 707, was struck by positive lightning and crashed near Elkton, Maryland, killing all 81 people on board.

=== 1964 ===
- February 25 – Eastern Air Lines Flight 304, a Douglas DC-8, crashed in Lake Pontchartrain due to loss of control following a pitch trim failure, killing all 51 passengers and seven crew.
- February 29 – British Eagle International Airlines Flight 802/6, a Bristol Britannia, crashed into a mountain near Innsbruck, Austria. All 75 passengers and eight crew were killed in the crash.
- March 1 – Paradise Airlines Flight 901A, a Lockheed L-049 Constellation, struck a mountain near Lake Tahoe due to pilot error in low visibility, killing all 85 on board.
- March 28 – Alitalia Flight 45, a Vickers Viscount flying from to Turin to Naples, with a stopover in Rome, crashed into Mount Somma on approach to its final destination. All 45 people on board were killed.
- April 17 – Middle East Airlines Flight 444, a Sud Aviation Caravelle, crashed into the Persian Gulf on approach to Dahran International Airport, killing all 49 passengers and crew on board.
- May 7 – Pacific Air Lines Flight 773, a Fairchild F27, crashed near San Ramon, California, killing all 44 on board, after a passenger shot both the captain and first officer before turning the gun on himself.
- May 20 – Philippine Airlines Flight 26/25, a de Havilland Canada DHC-3 Otter, crashed at Sibuco Point, Philippines, killing all 11 on board.
- June 20 – Civil Air Transport Flight 106, a Curtiss C-46, crashed near Shenkang, Taiwan, due to loss of control following engine failure, killing all 57 on board.
- July 9 – United Air Lines Flight 823, a Vickers Viscount, crashed near Parrottsville, Tennessee, following an unexplained in-flight fire; all 39 passengers and crew died.
- September 2 – Aeroflot Flight 721, an Ilyushin Il-18, crashed into a hillside while on approach to Yuzhno-Sakhalinsk Airport due to pilot error, killing 87 of 93 on board.
- September 4 – VASP Flight 141, a Vickers Viscount, crashed into a mountain, killing all 39 occupants.
- October 2 – A UTA Douglas DC-6 crashed into Mount Alcazaba, Spain, due to an unexplained deviation from the flight route, killing all 80 on board.
- November 15 – Bonanza Air Lines Flight 114, a Fairchild F-27, struck a hilltop in poor weather while on a nighttime approach to Las Vegas, Nevada, killing all 29 on board; the crash was initially thought to have been caused by the pilot misreading the approach chart, but it was later revealed that the approach chart was marked incorrectly.
- November 20 – Linjeflyg Flight 267V, a Convair 440, crashed during the approach to Engelholm, Sweden, when, in instrument meteorological conditions, the crew abandoned the set procedure and descended prematurely; 31 people were killed and 12 survived.

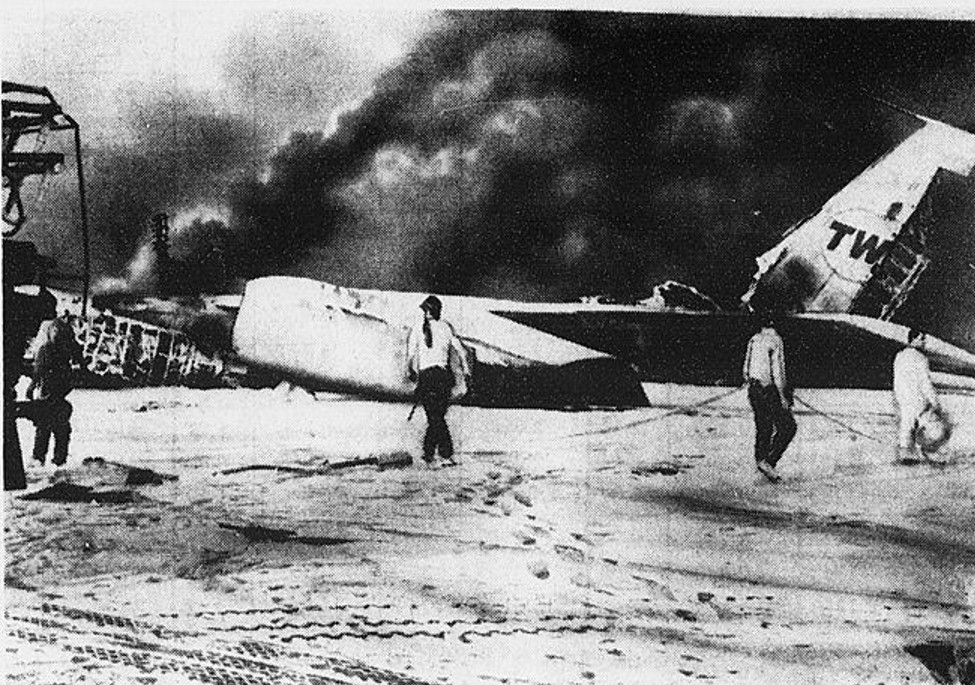
The burnt out wreckage of TWA Flight 800 (1964)

- November 23 – TWA Flight 800, a Boeing 707, suffered engine failure and crashed at Leonardo da Vinci-Fiumicino Airport when a thrust reverser failed to deploy, killing 49 of 73 on board.
- December 24 – Flying Tiger Line Flight 282, a Lockheed Constellation, crashed near San Bruno, California, after an unexplained course deviation, killing the crew of three.

=== 1965 ===
- January 4 – Aeroflot Flight 101/X-20, an Ilyushin Il-18, crashed on approach to Alma-Ata in poor visibility, killing 64 of 103 on board.
- February 6 – LAN Chile Flight 107, a Douglas DC-6, crashed shortly after takeoff from Santiago-Los Cerrillos Airport in Santiago, Chile. All 87 passengers and crew were killed.
- February 8 – Eastern Air Lines Flight 663, a Douglas DC-7B, overreacted during takeoff trying to avoid Pan Am Flight 212 (a Boeing 707) on approach, lost control, and crashed into the ocean several miles off Jones Beach State Park, New York, killing all 84 on board.
- March 7 – Aeroflot Flight 542, a Lisunov Li-2, crashed in the mountains in Krasnoyarsk Krai, Russia, after the left wing failed in severe turbulence, killing all 31 on board in the deadliest accident involving an Li-2.
- March 8 – Aeroflot Flight 513, a Tupolev Tu-124V, stalled and crashed after taking off from Kuibyshev Airport, Russia; 30 of the 39 passengers and crew were killed.
- March 17 – Eastern Provincial Airways Flight 102, a Handley-Page Dart Herald, broke up mid-air during climbing, killing all 8 on board.
- April 10 – An Alia Royal Jordanian Airlines Handley-Page Dart Herald broke up mid-air due to corrosion. All 54 were killed in the deadliest crash of the aircraft type.
- April 14 – British United Airways Flight 1030X, a Douglas C-47, crashed on landing at Jersey Airport due to pilot error; of the 27 passengers and crew, only a flight attendant survived.
- May 5 – Iberia Airlines Flight 401, a Lockheed L-1049 Super Constellation, crashed after hitting a tractor on the runway at Los Rodeos Airport, Tenerife, during a go-around in foggy weather; 30 of 49 passengers and crew died.
- May 20 – PIA Flight 705, a Boeing 720, crashed on descent to Cairo International Airport, killing 119 of 125 on board in the worst-ever accident involving the 720.
- June 28 – Pan Am Flight 843, a Boeing 707-321B, experienced an uncontained engine failure, causing the last 25 feet (8 m) of the right wing, along with the damaged engine, to break off from the rest of the aircraft. All 153 on board survived.
- July 1 – Continental Airlines Flight 12, a Boeing 707, ran off the end of the runway at Kansas City Downtown Airport and broke into three pieces; all 66 on board survived.
- July 8 – Canadian Pacific Air Lines Flight 21, a Douglas DC-6, crashed near 100 Mile House, British Columbia, after a bomb in the lavatory exploded; all 46 passengers and six crew died.
- July 10 – A Skyways Coach-Air Avro 748 crashed on landing at Lympne Airport, Kent, United Kingdom, due to a waterlogged runway. All 52 on board survived; the crash marked the first loss of an Avro 748/HS 748.
- July 20 – In the Cambrian Airways Liverpool crash, a Vickers Viscount crashed on approach into Liverpool-Speke Airport, United Kingdom. Both crew members, as well as two on the ground, were killed.
- July 23 – Allegheny Airlines Flight 604, a Convair CV-440, experienced an engine failure and crashed, due to a procedural shortcut; all 40 passengers and crew survived.
- August 16 – United Airlines Flight 389, a Boeing 727, crashed into Lake Michigan at night after the pilots apparently misread their altimeters; all 24 passengers and six crew died in the first fatal crash of a Boeing 727.
- September 17 – Pan Am Flight 292, a Boeing 707, crashed into Chances Peak, Montserrat, in stormy weather; all 30 on board died.
- October 20 – Philippine Airlines Flight 741, a Douglas DC-3, crashed shortly after takeoff from Manila Airport due to rudder deflection caused by pilot error, killing one of 37 on board.
- October 27 – A British European Airways Vickers Vanguard crashed during landing at London Heathrow Airport, killing all 36 on board.
- November 8 – American Airlines Flight 383, a Boeing 727, crashed while on approach to Greater Cincinnati airport; of the 62 people on board, one flight attendant and three passengers survived.

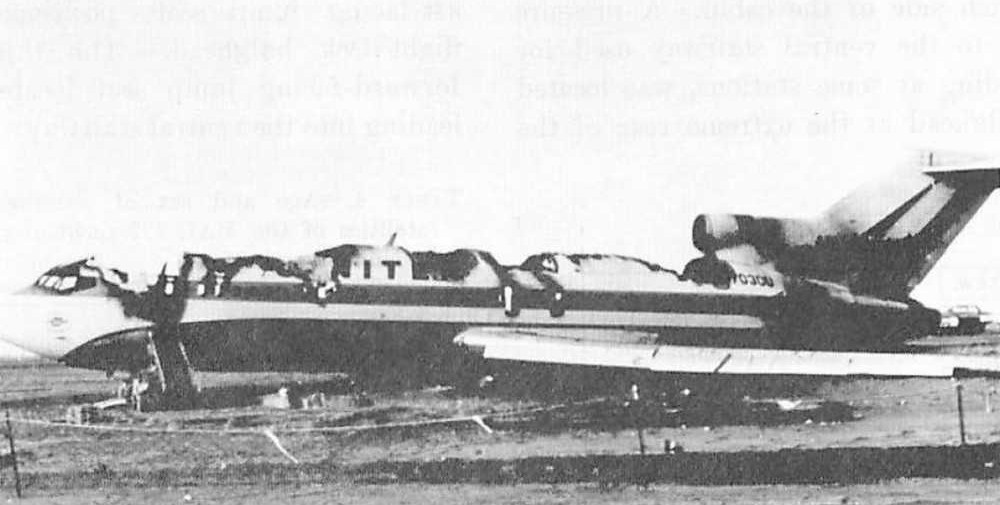
The wreckage of United 227

- November 11 – United Air Lines Flight 227, a Boeing 727, crashed short of the runway during landing at Salt Lake City International Airport, Utah; 43 of 91 on board were killed.
- November 11 – Aeroflot Flight 99, a Tupolev Tu-124, crashed near Murmansk, Russia, due to pilot error, killing 32 of 64 on board.
- December 4 – In the 1965 Carmel mid-air collision, Eastern Air Lines Flight 853, a Lockheed Super Constellation, collided with TWA Flight 42, a Boeing 707, over Carmel, New York. Flight 42 was able to land safely at John F. Kennedy International Airport with no casualties, while Flight 853 was forced to crash-land on Hunt Mountain, near Danbury, Connecticut, killing three passengers and one of the pilots.
- December 25 – Japan Airlines Flight 813, a Douglas DC-8-33, experienced an uncontained engine failure in its number one engine shortly after takeoff. The crew made an emergency landing at Metropolitan Oakland International Airport across San Francisco Bay. All 41 passengers and crew survived without any injuries.

=== 1966 ===
- January 15 – Avianca Flight 4, a Douglas C-54, suffered engine failure and crashed off Cartagena, Colombia, killing 56 of the 64 on board.
- January 24 – Air India Flight 101, a Boeing 707-437, crashed into the southwest face of Mont Blanc in France; all 106 passengers and 11 crew were killed.
- January 28 – Lufthansa Flight 005, a Convair 440, stalled and crashed at Bremen Airport while attempting a go-around following an aborted landing; all 46 on board died.
- February 2 – Pakistan International Airlines Flight 17, a Sikorsky S-61 helicopter, crashed near Faridpur, Bangladesh, Pakistan following main gearbox failure; of the 23 on board, only one passenger survived.
- February 4 – All Nippon Airways Flight 60, a Boeing 727-100, crashed in Tokyo Bay, Japan, for reasons unknown; all 133 on board were killed in Japan's worst air disaster at that time.
- February 17 – Aeroflot Flight 065, a Tupolev Tu-114, crashed on takeoff from Sheremetyevo International Airport due to crew and ATC errors, killing 21 of 63 on board.
- March 4 – Canadian Pacific Air Lines Flight 402, a McDonnell Douglas DC-8-43, crashed on landing at Tokyo International Airport due to pilot error, killing 64 of 72 on board.
- March 5 – BOAC Flight 911, a Boeing 707 bound for Hong Kong, broke up in mid-air in severe turbulence and crashed at Mount Fuji near Gotenba, Japan, killing all 124 passengers and crew.
- March 18 – United Arab Airlines Flight 749, an Antonov An-24, crashed while attempting to land at Cairo International Airport. All 30 passengers and crew on board were killed.
- April 22 – American Flyers Airline Flight 280/D, a Lockheed L-188 Electra, crashed into a hill short of Ardmore Municipal Airport in Oklahoma, United States, after the pilot suffered a heart attack, killing 83 of 98 on board.
- April 23 – Aeroflot Flight 2723, an Ilyushin Il-14, ditched in the Caspian Sea following unexplained engine problems; all 33 on board died.
- April 27 – LANSA Flight 501, a Lockheed L-749A Constellation, crashed into a mountain in Tomas District, Peru, killing all 49 passengers and crew.
- June 3 – A Hawker Siddeley Trident 1C crashed during the pre-delivery test flight. The crew had delayed doing recovery manoeuvres for too long, which caused the plane to enter a deep stall and flat spin, killing all 4 of them.
- June 29 – Philippine Air Lines Flight 785, a McDonnell Douglas DC-3, crashed due to pilot error aggravated by strong turbulence and gusts, killing 26 of the 28 on board.
- July 4 - An Air New Zealand Douglas DC-8 on a training flight crashed on takeoff after reverse thrust was inadvertently deployed. Two of the five on board were killed.
- August 6 – Braniff Flight 250, a BAC One-Eleven, flew into an active squall line and broke apart in mid-air near Falls City, Nebraska. All 42 on board were killed.
- August 26 – Japan Air Lines Convair 880 crashed shortly after takeoff, killing all 5 on board. Eyewitness stated that the plane had yawed to the left and skidded before being destroyed. The cause is still undetermined.
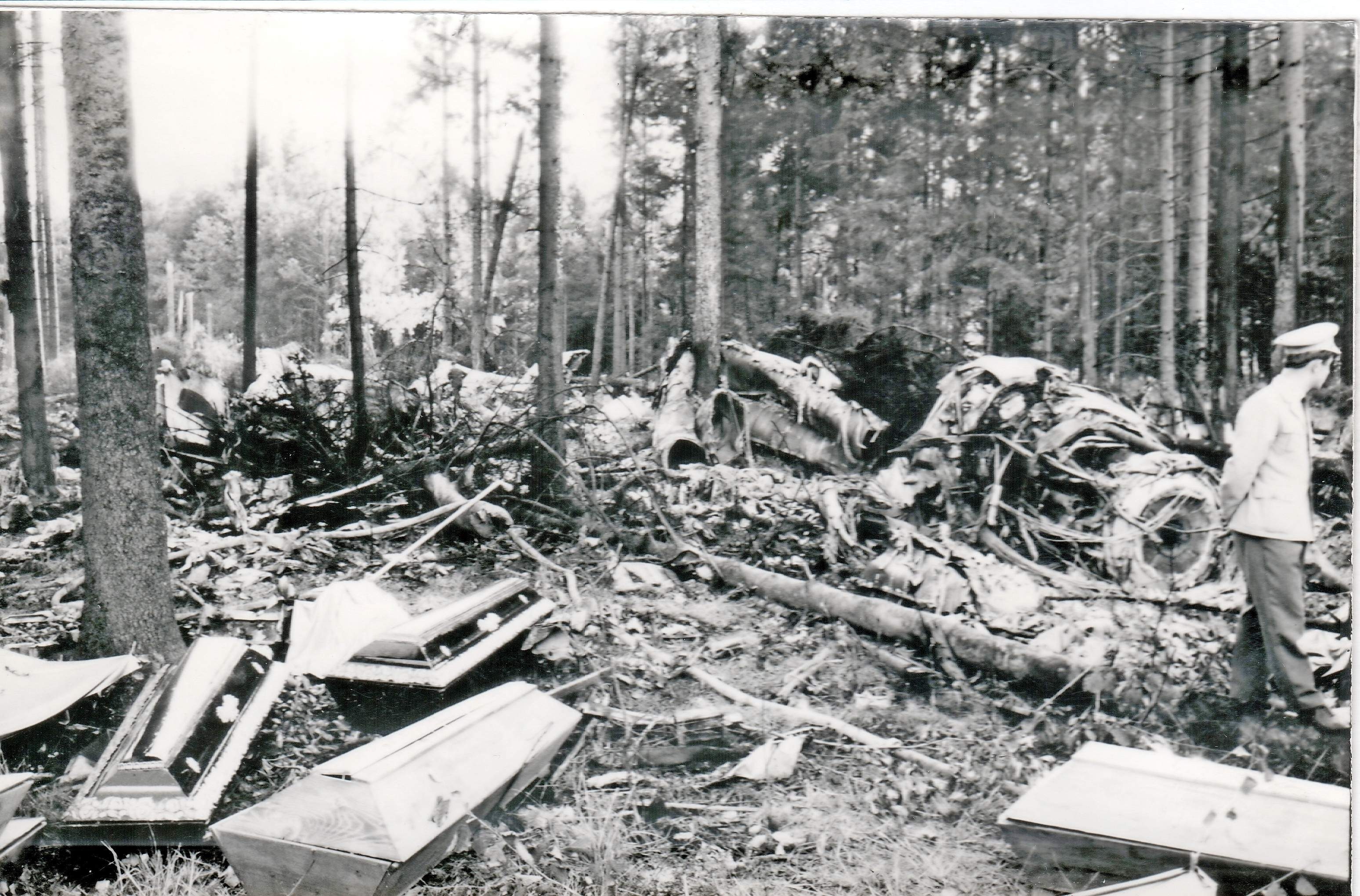
- Wreckage of Britannia Aiways Flight 105
  September 1 – Britannia Airways Flight 105, a Bristol Britannia, crashed on approach to Jože Pučnik Airport, Slovenia, due to an incorrectly set altimeter, killing 98 of 117 passengers and crew.
- September 22 – Ansett-ANA Flight 149, a Vickers Viscount, crashed near Winton, Queensland, Australia, after a fire had weakened a wing which had then broken off, killing all 24 people on board.
- September 28 – Aerolíneas Argentinas Flight 648, a Douglas DC-4, was hijacked by 18 Argentine nationalists and force-landed in the Falkland Islands in protest against the UK's presence in the islands. On September 29, after negotiations, the group surrendered.
- October 1 – West Coast Airlines Flight 956, a Douglas DC-9, crashed 5.5 miles (8.9 km) south of Wemme, Oregon, for reasons unknown, killing all 18 on board in the first loss of a DC-9.
- November 13 – All Nippon Airways Flight 533, a NAMC YS-11, plunged into Seto Inland Sea after an overrun at Matsuyama Airport, Shikoku, Japan, killing all 50 passengers and crew; this crash was the first loss of a YS-11.
- November 15 – Pan Am Flight 708, a Boeing 727, crashed near Berlin, Germany, for reasons unknown; all three crew members were killed.
- November 24 – TABSO Flight 101, an Ilyushin Il-18B, crashed into a wooded hillside shortly after takeoff from Bratislava, Czechoslovakia, due to pilot error, killing all 82 on board.
- December 24 – A Flying Tiger Line Canadair CL-44 crashed into the village of Binh Thai, South Vietnam, due to pilot error, killing all four crew and another 107 on the ground.

=== 1967 ===
- January 14 – Aeroflot Flight 5003, an Antonov An-12, crashed shortly after takeoff from Tolmachevo Airport following an in-flight fire, killing the six crew.
- February 16 – Garuda Indonesian Airways Flight 708, a Lockheed L-188 Electra, crashed while landing at Manado, Indonesia, killing 22 of 84 passengers on board; all eight crew survived.
- February 28 – Philippine Air Lines Flight 345, a Fokker F-27, lost control while on approach to Cebu International Airport and crashed due to improper weight distribution, killing 12 of 19 on board.
- March 5 – Lake Central Airlines Flight 527, a Convair 580, broke up in mid-air and crashed near Marseilles, Ohio, due to propeller failure; all 38 on board died.
- March 5 – Varig Airlines Flight 837, a Douglas DC-8, crashed while on approach to Roberts International Airport due to pilot error, killing 51 of 90 on board as well as five on the ground.
- March 9 – TWA Flight 553, a McDonnell Douglas DC-9, collided with a Beechcraft Baron near Dayton, Ohio, killing all 26 on both aircraft.
- March 10 – West Coast Airlines Flight 720, a Fokker F27 Friendship, crashed shortly after taking off from Klamath Falls, Oregon, due to icing, killing all four on board.
- March 13 – South African Airways Flight 406, a Vickers Viscount 818, crashed in the Indian Ocean off Cape Province, South Africa, while on approach to East London following an unexplained loss of control, killing all 25 passengers and crew.
- March 30 – Delta Air Lines Flight 9877, a Douglas DC-8, stalled during a simulated two engine-out approach and crashed at New Orleans, killing all six people on board and 13 on the ground.
- April 11 – An Air Algérie DC-4 crashed into a mountain near Tamanrasset, Algeria, killing 35 of 39 on board.
- April 20 – The 1967 Nicosia Britannia disaster: a Globe Air-operated Bristol Britannia on a charter flight crashed near Lakatamia, Cyprus, killing 126 of 130 on board.
- June 3 – In the 1967 Air Ferry DC-4 accident, a Douglas DC-4 struck a mountain en route from Manston Airport, England, to Perpignan Airport, France, due to crew errors stemming from carbon monoxide poisoning, killing all 88 on board.
- June 4 – The Stockport air disaster: British Midland Flight 542, a Canadair C-4 Argonaut carrying passengers returning from Palma de Mallorca, crashed near Stockport while on approach to Ringway Airport, Manchester, after both right-side engines failed due to a defect in the fuel system, killing 72 of 84 on board.
- June 23 – Mohawk Airlines Flight 40, a BAC One-Eleven, crashed at Blossburg, Pennsylvania, due to loss of control following an in-flight fire, killing all 34 people on board.
- June 30 – Thai Airways International Flight 601, a Sud Aviation Caravelle, crashed into the sea due to pilot error on landing at Kai Tak Airport during a typhoon, killing 24 of 80 on board.
- July 6 – Philippine Airlines Flight 385, a Fokker F-27 Friendship 100, struck Mount Kanlaon in bad weather, killing all 21 on board.
- July 19 – Piedmont Airlines Flight 22, a Boeing 727 departing from Asheville, North Carolina, collided with a Cessna 310 on instrument approach to Asheville, killing all 82 on board both aircraft.
- September 5 – ČSA Flight 523, an Ilyushin Il-18D, crashed after takeoff from Gander, Canada, after it failed to climb for reasons unknown, killing 37 of 69 people on board.
- October 12 – Cyprus Airways Flight 284, a de Havilland Comet, broke up in mid-air over the Mediterranean Sea after a bomb exploded, killing all 66 on board.
- November 4 – Iberia Flight 062, a Sud Aviation Caravelle, struck Blackdown Hill, United Kingdom, for reasons unknown, killing all 37 on board.
- November 5 – Cathay Pacific Flight 033, a Convair 880, overran the runway during the take-off from Kai Tak Airport, killing one of the 127 on board.
- November 6 – TWA Flight 159, a Boeing 707, overshot the runway at Greater Cincinnati Airport and caught fire; all on board escaped the aircraft, but a passenger died four days later.
- November 16 – Aeroflot Flight 2230, an Ilyushin Il-18, crashed shortly after takeoff from Koltsovo Airport due to electrical and instrument failure following engine failure, killing all 107 passengers and crew.
- November 20 – TWA Flight 128, a Convair 880, crashed at Constance, Kentucky, on approach to Greater Cincinnati Airport due to pilot error, killing 70 of 82 people on board.
- December 8 – A Faucett Perú Douglas C-54 crashed into a mountain near Cordillera de Carpish, Peru, killing all 72 on board.
- December 30 – Aeroflot Flight L-51, an Antonov An-24, crashed on approach to Liepāja Airport, Latvia, due to pilot error, killing 43 of 51 on board.

=== 1968 ===
- January 6 – Aeroflot Flight 1668, an Antonov An-24, crashed shortly after takeoff from Olekminsk, Russia, due to an unexplained loss of control, killing all 45 on board.
- February 7 – Canadian Pacific Air Lines Flight 322, a Boeing 707 arriving from Honolulu, slid off the runway and crashed into airport buildings at Vancouver. One of the 61 people on board and one person on the ground were killed.
- February 16 – Civil Air Transport Flight 10, a Boeing 727, crashed at Hunan village, Linkou Township, Taipei County (now Linkou District, New Taipei City), Taiwan, due to pilot error, killing 21 of 63 on board and one person on the ground.
- February 29 – Aeroflot Flight 15, an Ilyushin Il-18D, lost control and crashed near Parchum, Russia; of the 84 on board, only one survived.
- March 6 – Air France Flight 212, a Boeing 707, crashed into the northwestern slope of La Soufrière Mountain in Guadeloupe with the loss of all 63 lives on board.
- March 24 – Aer Lingus Flight 712, a Vickers Viscount 803, crashed off the Irish coast due to an unexplained mid-air breakup, killing all 61 on board.
- March 27 – Ozark Air Lines Flight 965, a Douglas DC-9, collided with a Cessna 150 over St. Louis, Missouri; the Cessna crashed, killing both occupants, while the DC-9 landed safely at Lambert Field with no casualties.
- April 8 – BOAC Flight 712, a Boeing 707, suffered an uncontained engine failure after takeoff from London Heathrow Airport; the plane made an emergency landing at Heathrow, but five of 127 on board died in the resultant fire.
- April 20 – South African Airways Flight 228, a Boeing 707, crashed just after takeoff from Strijdom International Airport, Windhoek, South West Africa (now Namibia), due to pilot error; of the 128 on board, only five survived.
- May 3 – Braniff International Airways Flight 352, a Lockheed L-188A Super Electra en route from Houston, Texas, to Dallas, broke up in mid-air in a thunderstorm and crashed near Dawson, Texas, killing all 85 on board.
- May 22 – Los Angeles Airways Flight 841, a Sikorsky S-61L, crashed near Paramount, California, due to rotor system failure, killing all 23 on board.
- May 28 – Garuda Indonesian Airways Flight 892, a Convair 990, crashed after takeoff from Bombay, India, killing all 29 on board and one on the ground.
- July 1 – Seaboard World Airlines Flight 253A, a Douglas DC-8, was forced to land in the Soviet Union; on board were over 200 American troops bound for Vietnam.
- July 3 – In the 1968 BKS Air Transport Heathrow crash, an Airspeed Ambassador freight aircraft experienced metal fatigue and crashed while landing, striking two unoccupied British European Airways airliners. Six of the freighter's crew of eight were killed, as were eight racehorses being transported. All Airspeed Ambassadors were grounded until a redesign strengthened the flaps.
- July 23 – Three members of the Popular Front for the Liberation of Palestine hijacked El Al Flight 426 from Rome to Tel Aviv. Diverting to Algiers, the negotiations extended over 40 days. Both the hijackers and the hostages went free.
- August 2 - Alitalia Flight 660, a Douglas DC-8 flying from Rome to Montreal with a stopover in Milan, crashed on Mount San Giacomo, Italy; 12 of the 95 people on board were killed.
- August 9 - British Eagle Flight 802, a Vickers Viscount, crashed into a highway near Langenbruck, Germany, after all electrical generators disconnected. All 48 on board were killed.
- August 10 – Piedmont Airlines Flight 230, a Fairchild F-27 flying from Louisville to Roanoke with stopovers in Cincinnati and Charleston, crashed on approach to Charleston; 35 of the 37 people on board were killed.
- August 14 – Los Angeles Airways Flight 417, a Sikorsky S-61L prototype, crashed at Compton, California, after a main rotor blade separated due to fatigue, killing all 21 on board.
- September 11 – Air France Flight 1611, a Sud Aviation SE-210 Caravelle, crashed near Nice, France, due to loss of control following an unexplained in-flight fire, killing all 95 passengers and crew on board.
- October 6 – Aeromaya Flight 322, a Hawker Siddeley HS 748, was hijacked was by a passenger demanding to refuge to Cuba. No one of the 21 involved died in the first hijacking of a Mexican aircraft.
- October 25 – Northeast Airlines Flight 946, a Fairchild Hiller FH-227, crashed near Etna, New Hampshire, due to pilot error, killing 32 passengers and crew.
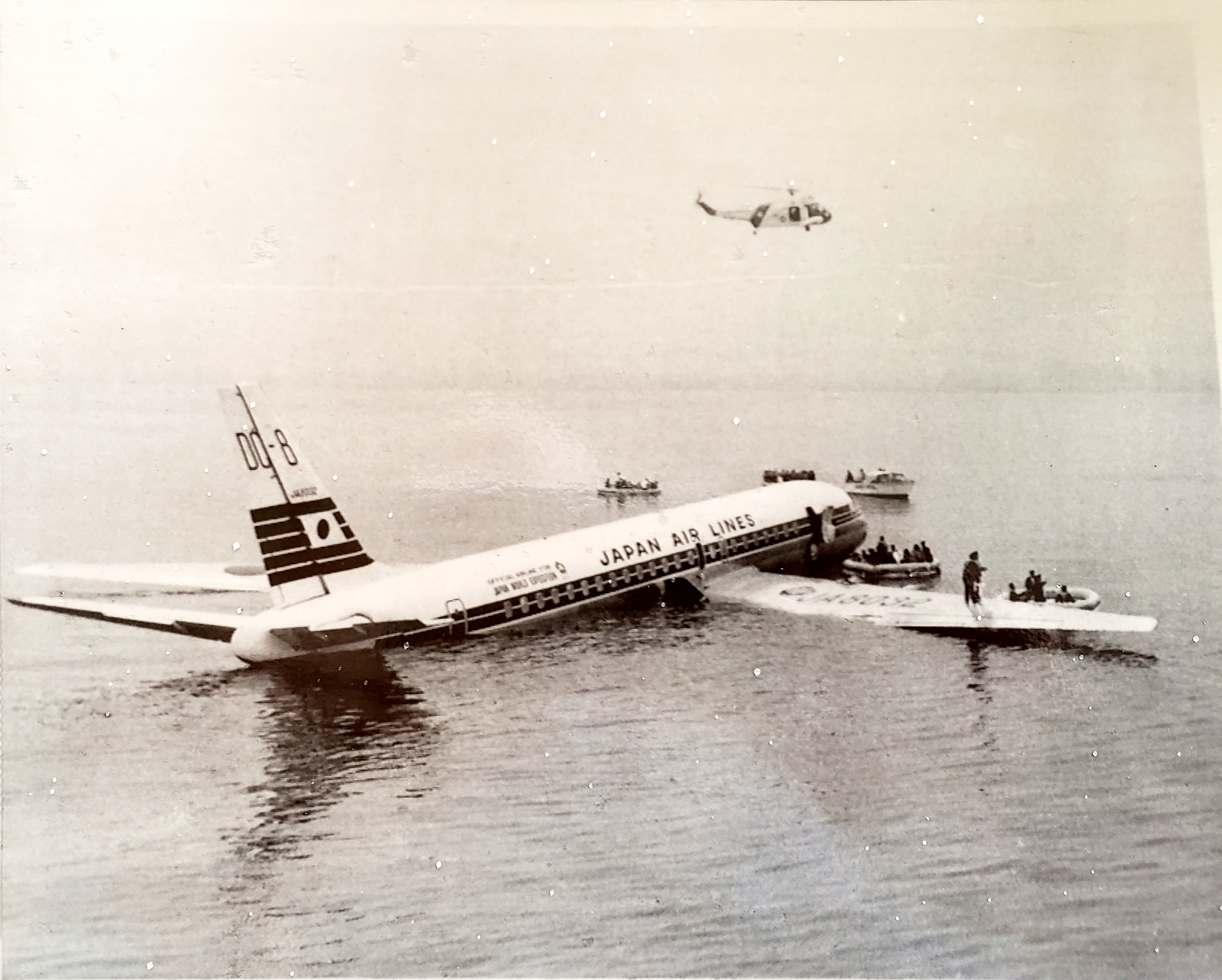
- Japan Air Lines Flight 2 after the accidental ditch
  November 22 – Japan Air Lines Flight 2, a Douglas DC-8, ditched in San Francisco Bay as a result of pilot error; all 107 on board survived.
- November 24 – Pan Am Flight 281: Four men hijacked a Pan Am flight heading from JFK International Airport to San Juan International Airport, Puerto Rico. All 208 people survived and the hijackers were arrested.
- December 2 – Wien Consolidated Airlines Flight 55, a Fairchild F-27B, crashed in Pedro Bay, Alaska, after a wing separated in severe turbulence, killing all 39 on board.
- December 12 – Pan Am Flight 217, a Boeing 707, crashed near Caracas, Venezuela, as a result of pilot error; all 51 on board died.
- December 24 – Allegheny Airlines Flight 736, a Convair 580, crashed while on approach to Bradford Regional Airport, killing 20 of 47 on board
- December 26 – The Palestine Liberation Organization attacked El Al Flight 253, killing one passenger and injuring two more of the 51 on board. This attack and Flight 426 (five months earlier) then led to the 1968 Israeli raid on Beirut Airport.
- December 26 – Pan Am Flight 799, a Boeing 707-321C, crashed shortly after takeoff due to retracted flaps, killing all three occupants.
- December 27 – North Central Airlines Flight 458, a Convair 580, crashed into a hangar at O'Hare International Airport in Chicago, Illinois, due to pilot error and spatial disorientation, killing 27 of the 45 people on board and one person on the ground.
- December 27 – Ozark Air Lines Flight 982, a Douglas DC-9 headed from Sioux Falls to Chicago, crashed shortly after take off from its stopover in Sioux City. All 68 people on board survived, but 35 were injured.
- December 31 – MacRobertson Miller Airlines Flight 1750, a Vickers Viscount, crashed near Port Hedland in Western Australia after much of the right wing separated due to a maintenance error, killing all 26 people on board.

=== 1969 ===
- January 5 – Ariana Afghan Airlines Flight 701, a Boeing 727-100C on approach to London Gatwick Airport from Frankfurt Airport, crashed into a house in dense fog, killing 48 of the 62 people on board; a married couple living at the house also died, but their baby survived.
- January 6 – Allegheny Airlines Flight 737, a Convair CV-580, crashed while on approach to Bradford Regional Airport; 11 of the 28 passengers and crew were killed.
- January 13 – Scandinavian Airlines Flight 933, a Douglas DC-8, crashed into Santa Monica Bay due to pilot error, killing 15 of 45 on board.
- January 18 – United Air Lines Flight 266, a Boeing 727 en route from Los Angeles to Milwaukee, lost all electrical power and crashed into Santa Monica Bay; six crew and 32 passengers were killed.
- January 24 – LOT Polish Airlines Flight 149, an Antonov An-24B, contacted with a tree and struck a powerline. It ended up crashing into an embankment and came to rest across the street. Fortunately, no one died, but 3 of the 48 on board were injured.
- February 18 – El Al Flight 432 was attacked by the Popular Front for the Liberation of Palestine, killing one on board.
- February 18 – Hawthorne Nevada Airlines Flight 708, a Douglas DC-3, crashed near Lone Pine, California, killing all 35 people on board.
- February 24 – Far Eastern Air Transport Flight 104, a Handley Page Dart Herald, suffered engine failure and crashed while on approach to Tainan Airport, Taiwan; all 36 on board died.
- March 5 – Prinair Flight 277, a de Havilland Heron, crashed into mountainous territory at Luquillo, Puerto Rico, killing all 19 people on board.
- March 16 – Viasa Flight 742, a McDonnell Douglas DC-9-30, crashed on takeoff from Maracaibo, Venezuela. All 84 passengers on board, plus 71 people on the ground were killed in the crash. At 155 people dead, it was the worst aviation disaster in history at that time.
- March 20 – In the 1969 Aswan Ilyushin Il-18 crash, a United Arab Airlines flight crashed while attempting to land at Aswan International Airport; 100 of the 105 passengers and crew were killed.
- March 25 – Delta Air Lines Flight 821 was hijacked by a man who wanted to go to Havana, Cuba. No one died of the 114 occupants.
- April 2 – LOT Polish Airlines Flight 165, an Antonov An-24, crashed in southern Poland, killing all 53 people on board.
- April 28 – LAN-Chile Flight 160, a Boeing 727, crashed near Colina, Chile; all 60 on board survived.
- June 4 – Mexicana de Aviación Flight 704, a Boeing 727, crashed near Salinas Victoria in Mexico. All 79 passengers and crew on board were killed.
- June 23 – In the Yukhnov mid-air collision, Aeroflot Flight 831, an Ilyushin Il-14, collided in mid-air with a Soviet Air Force Antonov An-12 over Yukhnovsky District, Russia, killing all 120 people on both aircraft.
- June 23 – Dominicana de Aviación Flight 401, an ATL-98 Carvair operating a cargo flight to Santo Domingo, crashed on takeoff from Miami. All four people on board were killed; additionally, six people on the ground were killed and 12 were injured.
- July 26 – TWA Flight 5787, a Boeing 707-331C, crashed after it failed to engage the hydraulic pumps. Only three engines were on as this was a test flight; the plane lost directional control, killing all five on board.
- August 3 – Aeroflot Flight N-826, an Antonov An-24, crashed after the left propeller detached, causing it to enter a steep spiral. The crash killed all 55 on board.
- August 26 – Aeroflot Flight 1770, an Ilyushin Il-18B, belly-landed due to the pilots' forgetfulness and failure to be aware of the situation; 16 of the 101 on board died due to smoke inhalation.
- August 29 – In the TWA Flight 840 hijacking, two operatives from the Popular Front for the Liberation of Palestine forced a Boeing 707 to land at Damascus, Syria; all passengers were released except for two passengers who were released two months later; there were no casualties among the 127 on board, but the aircraft's nose section was blown up.
- September 9 – Allegheny Airlines Flight 853, a Douglas DC-9, collided in mid-air with a Piper PA-28 Cherokee and crashed near Fairland, Indiana, killing all 83 occupants of the two aircraft.
- September 12 – Philippine Air Lines Flight 158, a BAC One-Eleven, crashed on approach to Manila International Airport, killing 45 of the 47 passengers and crew.
- September 20 – An Air Vietnam C-54 collided with a F-4 during approach to Da Nang Air Base, killing 77 people.
- September 21 – Mexicana de Aviación Flight 801, a Boeing 727, crashed into an embankment during approach to Mexico City; 27 of the 118 passengers and crew were killed.
- November 19 – Mohawk Airlines Flight 411, a Fairchild 227, crashed near Glens Falls, New York, killing all 14 people on board.
- November 20 – Nigeria Airways Flight 925, a Vickers VC-10, crashed on approach to Lagos International Airport, killing all 87 passengers and crew.
- December 3 – Air France Flight 212, a Boeing 707-328B, crashed into the sea shortly after takeoff from Simón Bolívar International Airport, Venezuela, with the loss of all 62 on board.
- December 8 – Olympic Airways Flight 954, a DC-6, crashed into Mt. Paneio while on approach to Athens-Ellinikon International Airport. All 90 passengers and crew were killed.
- December 11 – A Korean Air Lines YS-11 was hijacked by a North Korean agent while flying from Gangneung to Seoul. Out of the 51 South Koreans on board, 11 were presumed to have been retained in North Korea.

== 1970s ==
=== 1970 ===
- January 1 — Serviços Aéreos Cruzeiro do Sul Flight 114, a Sud Aviation Caravelle SE 210, was hijacked by six members of VAR-Palmares. From Montevideo, the plane was diverted to Havana where the hijack stopped after 47 hours. All 28 occupants survived.
- January 5 — A Spantax Convair 990 Coronado crashed shortly after takeoff from Stockholm's Arlanda Airport when the flight crew lost control of the aircraft; five of the ten people on board were killed.
- February 4 – Aerolíneas Argentinas Flight 707, a Hawker Siddeley HS 748 operating a multi-leg flight from Paraguay to Argentina, crashed near Loma Alta when the pilots lost control of the aircraft due to severe turbulence; all 37 passengers and crew were killed.
- February 4 – TAROM Flight 35, an Antonov An-24 on a domestic route from Bucharest to Oradea, crashed on Mount Vlădeasa, killing 20 of the 21 people on board.
- February 6 – Aeroflot Flight U-45, an Ilyushin Il-18 operating a domestic flight in Uzbekistan, crashed into a mountain on approach to Samarkand International Airport due to ATC error; 92 of the 106 people on board were killed.
- February 15 – Dominicana de Aviación Flight 603, a McDonnell Douglas DC-9, crashed shortly after takeoff from Santo Domingo in the Dominican Republic, due to a dual-engine failure; all 102 people on board were killed.
- February 21 – Swissair Flight 330, a Convair CV-990 bound for Tel Aviv, Israel, en route to Hong Kong, crashed when a bomb detonated in the cargo hold nine minutes after takeoff from Zurich International Airport, Switzerland; all 38 passengers and nine crew were killed.
- March 17 – Eastern Air Lines Shuttle Flight 1320, a Douglas DC-9-31 flying from Newark, New Jersey, to Boston, Massachusetts, was hijacked by a suicidal man who shot both pilots before being subdued; the captain made a successful emergency landing in Boston, where the hijacker was arrested; the co-pilot died from his injuries.
- March 31 – Japan Airlines Flight 351, a Boeing 727 operating a domestic flight from Tokyo to Fukuoka, was hijacked by a Japanese Red Army faction who forced the crew to proceed to North Korea after releasing 21 passengers at Fukuoka Airport; the hijackers eventually surrendered and all 129 people on board the flight were unharmed.
- April 1 – Aeroflot Flight 1661, an Antonov An-24 operating a domestic flight in Russia, crashed on climbout after departing from Novosibirsk Tolmachevo Airport, due to a collision with a weather balloon; all 45 passengers and crew were killed.
- April 4 — A Royal Air Maroc Caravelle crashed while attempting to avoid a town in Berrechid, Morocco, killing 61 of the 81 on board, and possibly four more who were reported to have later died in hospital.
- April 21 – Philippine Airlines Flight 215, a Hawker Siddeley HS 748 operating a domestic flight from Cauayan Airport to Manila International Airport, exploded in mid-air and crashed 75 miles (121 km) north of its destination, killing all 36 on board; a bomb was most likely responsible for the crash.
- May 2 – ALM Flight 980, a Douglas DC-9 operated by Overseas National Airways, ditched into the Caribbean Sea near St. Croix, Virgin Islands, due to fuel exhaustion after several unsuccessful landing attempts at St. Maarten in the Dutch Antilles; 23 of the 63 people on board were killed.
- July 3 – Dan-Air Flight 1903, a de Havilland Comet 4 operating a flight from Manchester, England, to Barcelona, Spain, crashed near Arbúcies in Catalonia on approach to El Prat Josep Tarradellas Airport; all 112 people on board were killed.
- July 5 – Air Canada Flight 621, a Douglas DC-8 operating a flight from Montreal, Canada, to Los Angeles, United States, crashed during a failed landing attempt at its scheduled stopover at Toronto Pearson International Airport, killing all 109 on board.
- July 22 — Olympic Airways Flight 255 was hijacked by six members of the Popular Front for the Liberation of Palestine and possibly the Palestinian Popular Struggle Front. They demanded the release of seven Palestinians held in Greece for three terrorist incidents including El Al Flight 253. The Greek authorities accepted the demands, and all 55 people survived. However, it was the basis of the Dawson's Field hijackings.
- July 27 – Flying Tiger Line Flight 45, a Douglas DC-8, crashed just short of Naha Airport, killing all four crew members on board.
- August 9 – LANSA Flight 502, a Lockheed L-188 Electra turboprop operating a domestic flight in Peru, crashed shortly after takeoff from Cusco's Quispiquilla Airport due to engine failure, killing 99 of the 100 people on board, including 49 U.S. high school exchange students, as well as two on the ground.
- August 12 – China Airlines Flight 206, a NAMC YS-11, crashed into Yuan Mountain in thick fog during a severe thunderstorm, while on approach to Taipei International Airport; 14 of the 31 people on board lost their lives.

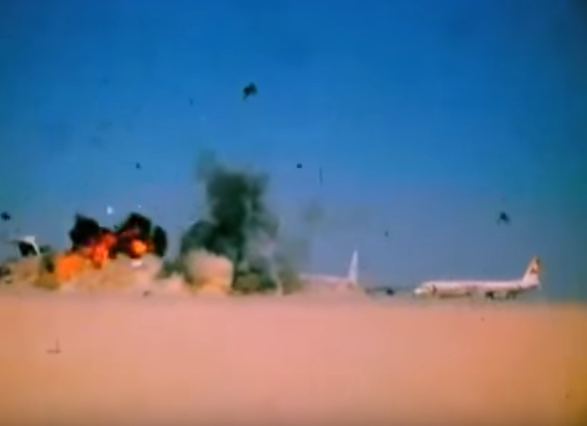
Hijacked aircraft being destroyed by PFLP at Dawson's Field in front of international press (1970)

- September 2 – Aeroflot Flight 3630, a Tupolev Tu-124 en route from southern Russia to Lithuania, crashed after the pilots lost control of the aircraft at cruise altitude between Rostov-on-Don Airport and Vilnius Airport, on the second leg of the flight; all 37 passengers and crew were killed.
- September 3 – Aeroflot Flight Sh-4 crashed on Mount Airy-Tash, while flying from Fruzne to Dushnabe. All 21 people on board were killed in the first hull loss of the Yakolev Yak-40.
- September 6 – The Popular Front for the Liberation of Palestine orchestrated the Dawson's Field hijackings of El Al Flight 219 (Boeing 707), Pan Am Flight 93 (Boeing 747), Swissair Flight 100 (Douglas DC-8), TWA Flight 741 (Boeing 707), and (on September 9) BOAC Flight 775 (Vickers VC10); the unprecedented scale of the incident drew international outrage and contributed to the eventual widespread implementation of systematic air passenger screening; Pan Am Flight 93 was the first ever loss of the Boeing 747.
- September 8 – Trans International Airlines Flight 863, a Douglas DC-8 on a re-positioning flight, crashed during takeoff from John F. Kennedy International Airport, New York, killing all 11 crew members.
- September 26 – Flugfélag Islands Flight 704, a Fokker F-27 Friendship, crashed into an island while approaching Vágar Airport in clouds; eight occupants were killed and 26 survived.
- October 2 – A chartered Martin 4-0-4 airliner crashed into a mountain near Silver Plume, Colorado, United States, while carrying members of the Wichita State University football team to Logan, Utah, for a game; 31 of the 40 people on board were killed.
- October 15 – Aeroflot Flight 244, an Antonov An-24 flying from Georgia to Abkhazia along the Black Sea coast, was hijacked by a Lithuanian national and his 13-year-old son. They killed one flight attendant and forced the plane to divert to Trabzon, Turkey, where they surrendered to the Turkish government; this was the first known successful airline hijacking in the Soviet Union.
- November 14 – Southern Airways Flight 932, a chartered Douglas DC-9 flying from North Carolina to West Virginia, United States, crashed on approach to Huntington's Tri-State Airport due to pilot error; all 75 on board were killed, including 37 players of the Marshall University football team and eight of the coaching staff.
- November 27 – Capitol International Airways Flight C2C3/26, a chartered Douglas DC-8 scheduled to fly from McChord Field to Cam Ranh Air Base, crashed on takeoff from Alaska after a stopover, resulting in the deaths of 47 out of the 229 people on board.
- December 28 – Trans Caribbean Airways Flight 505 crashed after overshooting the runway at St Thomas, US Virgin Islands, after a flight from New York. Two of the 55 on board were killed, and 51 of the survivors were injured.
- December 31 – Aeroflot Flight 3012, an Ilyushin Il-18V, banked steeply to the right during takeoff due to improper aircraft configuration and began losing altitude. It then impacted nose-first and slid another 210 m. According to Aviation Safety Network, 6 out of 86 people died while some source said all 88 occupants died.

=== 1971 ===
- January 18 – Balkan Bulgarian Airlines Flight 130, an Ilyushin Il-18D, crashed during approach after it deviated from the course, killing 45 of the 47 occupants.
- January 22 – An Aeroflot Antonov An-12 crashed due to icing while on approach to Surgut International Airport, RSFSR, Soviet Union, killing all 14 on board.
- January 23 – A Korean Air Lines Fokker F27 was hijacked and was forcefully diverted to North Korea. During the struggle, the co-pilot and the hijacker was killed by a grenade. The captain successfully landed the plane in a beach.
- January 30 – In the 1971 Indian Airlines hijacking, a Fokker F-27 Friendship 100 operating a domestic passenger flight was hijacked en route from Srinagar to Jammu and flown to Lahore in Pakistan, where the passengers and crew were released and the plane subsequently destroyed.
- January 31 – An Aeroflot Antonov An-12 crashed due to icing while on approach to Surgut International Airport, RSFSR, Soviet Union. All seven on board were killed.
- March 31 – Aeroflot Flight 1969, an Antonov An-10, crashed on approach to Voroshilovgrad Airport (now Luhansk Airport), Ukrainian SSR, following an unexplained structural failure of the right wing, killing all 65 on board.
- May 23 – Aviogenex Flight 130, a Tupolev Tu-134 flying from London's Gatwick Airport to Rijeka Airport in Yugoslavia, crashed on landing at its destination due to an optical illusion, killing 78 of the 83 people on board.
- June 6 – Hughes Airwest Flight 706, a Douglas DC-9 operating a domestic flight from Los Angeles, California, to Seattle, Washington, United States, collided with a US Marine Corps McDonnell Douglas F-4B Phantom II fighter jet and crashed into the San Gabriel Mountains near Duarte, California, killing all 49 people on board; the fighter jet pilot was also killed, but the Radar Intercept Officer successfully bailed out.

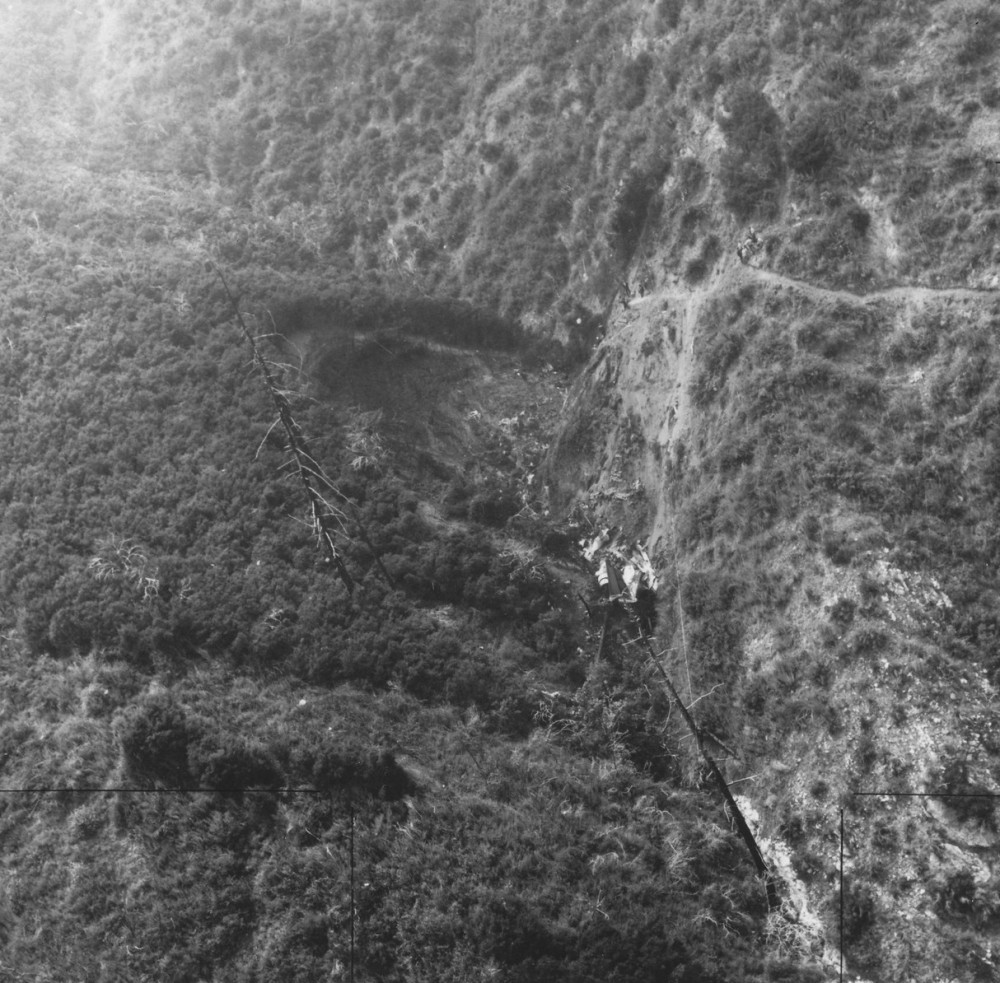
The crash site of Hughes Airwest Flight 706

- June 7 – Allegheny Airlines Flight 485, a Convair CV-580 operating a multi-leg domestic flight between Washington, D.C., and Virginia in the United States, crashed on approach to Tweed New Haven Airport, Connecticut, killing 28 of the 31 people on board.
- June 11 – TWA Flight 358, a Boeing 727, was hijacked by Gregory White demanding a machine gun, $75,000, and being diverted to North Vietnam. He soon surrendered by the FBI after being wounded. A passenger was killed of the 26 occupants.
- July 3 – Toa Domestic Airlines Flight 63, a NAMC YS-11 operating a domestic flight in Japan, crashed into Yokotsu Mountain near Hakodate Airport on Japan's Hokkaidō island, killing all 68 passengers and crew in the worst-ever disaster involving the YS-11.
- July 25 – Aeroflot Flight 1912, a Tupolev Tu-104 operating a multi-leg domestic flight between Odessa and Vladivostok in the Soviet Union, landed hard and crashed short of the runway at Irkutsk Airport, killing 97 of the 126 people on board.
- July 30 – All Nippon Airways Flight 58, a Boeing 727-200 operating a domestic flight from Sapporo to Tokyo, Japan, collided with a JASDF F-86 Sabre fighter jet at Shizukuishi near Morioka, killing all 162 passengers and crew on board; the F-86 pilot parachuted to safety, but was arrested and charged with involuntary manslaughter.

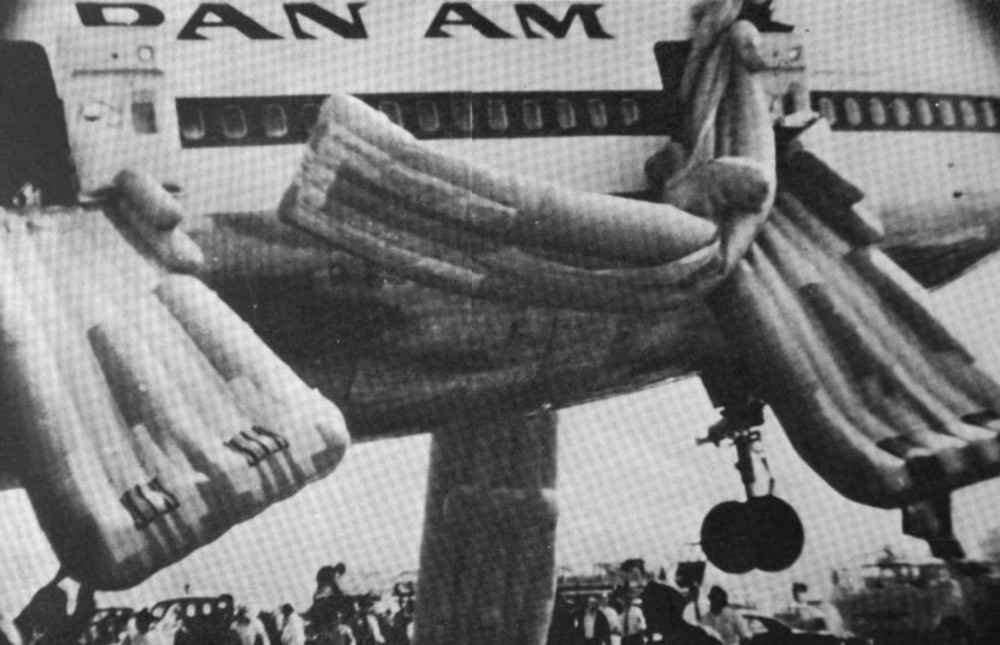
The lifted nose of Pan Am 845

- July 30 – Pan Am Flight 845, a Boeing 747-100 flying from Los Angeles, California, United States, to Tokyo, Japan, collided with approach lighting structures taking off from its intermediate stop, San Francisco International Airport. It dumped fuel, returned to the airport, and made an emergency landing. There were no fatalities but 29 of the 199 passengers were injured in the collision and during evacuation.
- August 28 – Malév Flight 731, an Ilyushin Il-18, crashed into Øresund off the coast of Denmark, about 10 kilometres (6.2 mi) from Copenhagen Airport, during a heavy rainstorm. Of the 34 people on board, only two survived.
- September 4 – Alaska Airlines Flight 1866, a Boeing 727 operating a flight from Anchorage, Alaska, to Seattle, Washington, United States, crashed into a mountain in the Tongass National Forest near Juneau, Alaska, killing all 111 on board.
- September 6 – Paninternational Flight 112, a BAC One-Eleven flying from Hamburg, Germany, to Málaga, Spain, suffered dual engine failure shortly after takeoff and crashed onto the motorway near Hamburg Airport, killing 22 of the 121 people on board.
- September 16 – Malév Flight 110, a Tupolev Tu-134, crashed while on approach to Kiev-Borispol Airport, Ukrainian SSR, in foggy weather, killing all 49 passengers and crew.
- October 2 – British European Airways Flight 706, a Vickers Vanguard turboprop flying from London's Heathrow Airport to Salzburg, Austria, broke up in mid-air and crashed near Aarsele, Belgium, after suffering explosive decompression, killing all 63 people on board.
- October 10 – Aeroflot Flight 773, a Tupolev Tu-104, broke up and crashed near Baranovo, Naro-Fominsky District, Russia, when a bomb placed in the cabin exploded; all 25 on board died.
- November 10 – A Merpati Nusantara Vickers Viscount 828 crashed in the Indian Ocean off the west coast of Sumatra, Indonesia, on approach to Tabing Airport in Padang, due to poor visibility in bad weather; all 69 people on board were killed.
- November 12 – Aeroflot Flight N-63, an Antonov An-24, stalled and crashed near Vinnitsa Airport, Ukrainian SSR, during a go-around in foggy weather, killing all 48 people on board.
- November 20 – China Airlines Flight 825, a Sud Aviation Caravelle, exploded in mid-air and crashed into the Taiwan Strait while on a flight from Taipei to Hong Kong, due to a terrorist bomb, killing all 25 people on board.
- November 24 – Northwest Orient Airlines Flight 305, a Boeing 727 flying from Portland, Oregon, to Seattle, Washington, United States, was hijacked by an unidentified person who parachuted from the aircraft mid-flight after extorting US$200,000 of ransom money from the US government; the aircraft landed safely and all 41 on board were unharmed, but the perpetrator has never been apprehended.
- November 27 – TWA Flight 106, a Boeing 727-31, was hijacked by three armed in order to go to Havana, Cuba. None of the 51 occupants were injured.
- December 1 – Aeroflot Flight 2174, an Antonov An-24, lost control and crashed on approach to Saratov Airport due to wing icing, killing all 57 on board.
- December 3 – Pakistan International Airlines Flight 712, a Boeing 720, was hijacked by Jean Kay, a 28 year old French humanitarian activist, with his members. He controlled the aircraft and landed while demanding the control tower medical supplies. Two police arrested him and there are no fatalities among the 28 occupants.
- December 24 – LANSA Flight 508, a Lockheed L-188 Electra en route from Lima to Pucallpa, Peru, broke up in mid-air during a thunderstorm and crashed in the Amazon rainforest; of the 92 on board, the sole survivor was a German teenager who fell 2 miles (3.2 km) strapped to her seat, and then walked for 10 days through the rainforest before being rescued by local lumbermen.

=== 1972 ===
- January 7 – Iberia Airlines Flight 602, a Sud Aviation SE 210 Caravelle flying from Valencia to Ibiza, crashed into a mountain while on approach to Ibiza Airport, killing all 104 passengers and crew.
- January 21 – a Turkish Airlines DC-9 crashed while attempting an emergency landing at Adana Airport, killing one of the five crew members.
- January 26 – JAT Flight 367, a McDonnell Douglas DC-9, suffered a bomb explosion in mid-air, killing 27 of the 28 on board; Vesna Vulović, the only survivor, was entered in the Guinness Book of World Records for surviving the longest fall without a parachute, over 33,000 feet (10,000 m).
- February 22 – Lufthansa Flight 649, a Boeing 747 en route from Tokyo to Frankfurt, was hijacked during the Delhi–Athens leg and forced to divert to Aden, South Yemen, where all 182 passengers and crew were released in exchange for a $5 million ransom.
- March 3 – Mohawk Airlines Flight 405, a Fairchild F-27 flying from New York City to Albany, New York, crashed while descending to land at Albany County Airport, killing 16 of the 48 people on board and one on the ground.
- March 14 – Sterling Airways Flight 296, a Sud Caravelle flying from Colombo, Ceylon, to Copenhagen, Denmark, crashed near Kalba in the United Arab Emirates due to pilot error; all 112 on board died. This was the worst air disaster in the history of the UAE.
- March 19 – EgyptAir Flight 763, a McDonnell Douglas DC-9 flying from Egypt to South Yemen, crashed on approach to Aden International Airport, killing all 30 passengers and crew.

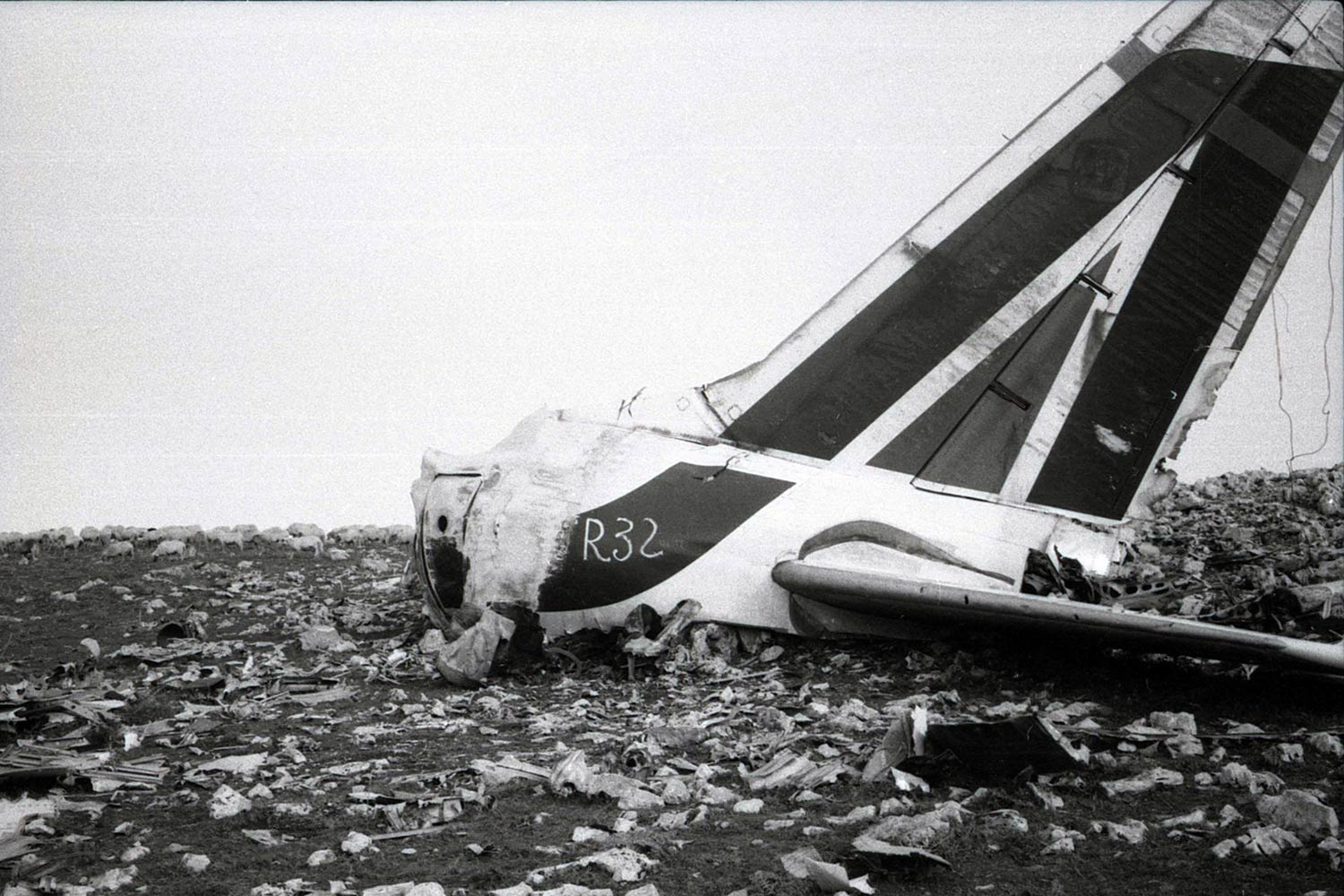
The wreckage of Alitalia Flight 112

- April 18 – East African Airways Flight 720, a Vickers VC10, crashed after overshooting the runway on takeoff. There were 43 deaths and 67 survivors.
- May 5 – Alitalia Flight 112, a Douglas DC-8 operating a domestic flight from Rome to Palermo, Italy, crashed into Mount Longa some 3 miles (4.8 km) southwest of its destination, killing all 115 passengers and crew; it remains the deadliest single-aircraft disaster in Italy.
- May 5 – Eastern Air Lines Flight 175, a Boeing 727, was hijacked by a man named Frederick Hahneman. After switching planes due to a mechanical issue, Hahneman forced the pilots to fly over Honduras airspace and jumped out of the plane with a parachute. He surrendered 28 days later.
- May 8 – Sabena Flight 571, a Boeing 707 flying from Brussels to Tel Aviv, was hijacked by members of the Black September Organisation demanding the release of Palestinian prisoners by Israel; during a commando raid the hijackers were killed or captured and one hostage terminally injured, the others freed.
- May 18 – Aeroflot Flight 1491, an Antonov An-10, suffered an in-flight structural failure on approach to Kharkiv Airport in Ukraine and crashed. All 122 passengers and crew were killed.
- May 30 – Delta Air Lines Flight 9570, a McDonnell Douglas DC-9 on a training flight, crashed due to wake turbulence from another aircraft, killing all 4 crew members.
- June 12 – American Airlines Flight 96, a McDonnell Douglas DC-10, suffered explosive depressurisation when one of its cargo doors failed mid-flight; the crew performed an emergency landing at Detroit Metro Airport, Michigan, where all 67 on board were evacuated safely.
- June 14 – Japan Airlines Flight 471, a Douglas DC-8 en route from Bangkok, Thailand, to New Delhi, India, crashed on approach to Palam Airport, killing 82 of the 87 on board and three people on the ground.
- June 15 – A carry-on suitcase bomb exploded on Cathay Pacific Flight 700Z, a Convair 880, at 29,000 feet (8,800 m) over Vietnam; all 81 on board died.
- June 18 – British European Airways Flight 548, a Hawker Siddeley Trident, underwent a series of stalls due to pilot error, followed by a deep stall, and crashed near Staines, United Kingdom; all 118 on board were killed.
- June 24 – Prinair Flight 191, a de Havilland Heron, overrotated because of pilot error and crashed in Ponce, Puerto Rico, killing five of the 20 people on board.
- June 29 – In the 1972 Lake Winnebago mid-air collision, North Central Airlines Flight 290, a Convair CV-580, and Air Wisconsin Flight 671, a de Havilland Canada DHC-6 Twin Otter, collided over Lake Winnebago near Appleton, Wisconsin, killing all 13 people on board the two aircraft.
- July 2 – Pan Am Flight 841, a Boeing 747 en route from San Francisco to Saigon, South Vietnam, was hijacked over the South China Sea by a political protester; the hijacker was killed at a fake refueling stop and no one else was harmed.
- July 5 – Pacific Southwest Airlines Flight 710, a Boeing 737-200, was hijacked by two people. The plane landed at San Francisco, where the FBI stormed into the plane and ended the hijacking. Of 84 occupants, three were killed including the hijackers.
- July 6 – Aviaco Flight 331, a Douglas DC-8, crashed into the sea during a repositioning flight, killing all 10 crew members.
- July 29 – Avianca Flight 630 collided in mid-air over Mámbita, Colombia, with Avianca Flight 626. All 38 people on board both DC-3s were killed.
- July 29 to August 2 – Delta Air Lines Flight 841, a McDonnell Douglas DC-8-51, was hijacked by five people who boarded with their three children. Their demand was accepted and the plane flew to Algeria, where the 86 hostages were released. All 101 people survived.
- August 14 – Interflug Flight 450, an Ilyushin Il-62, crashed near Königs Wusterhausen, to the southeast of Berlin; all 156 passengers and crew were killed. This was Germany's worst air disaster.
- August 16 – A Royal Air Maroc Boeing 727-2B6 is attacked by fighter jets in an attempt to assassinate king Hassan II of Morocco, who was on board, as part of a coup attempt. On the aircraft 8 people are killed and around 40 are injured, but a successful emergency landing was still carried out in Rabat.
- August 31 – Aeroflot Flight 558, an Ilyushin Il-18 en route from Karaganda, Kazakhstan, to Moscow in the Soviet Union, crashed following an in-flight fire; all 102 people on board were killed.
- September 15 – Scandinavian Airlines System Flight 130, a McDonnell Douglas DC-9, was hijacked by three armed persons. All 90 on board survived.
- September 24 – Japan Airlines Flight 472, a Douglas DC-8 flying from London to Tokyo with 122 on board, overshot the runway after landing at the wrong airport; there were no fatalities.
- October 1 – Aeroflot Flight 1036, an Ilyushin Il-18V, crashed into the Black Sea during takeoff from Sochi International Airport in the Soviet Union, for reasons unknown; all 109 passengers and crew were killed.
- October 13 – Aeroflot Flight 217, an Ilyushin Il-62 flying from Paris to Moscow, crashed on approach to Sheremetyevo International Airport for reasons unknown; all 174 passengers and crew on board were killed.
- October 13 – Uruguayan Air Force Flight 571, a Fairchild F-27 en route from Montevideo, Uruguay, to Santiago, Chile, crashed in the Andes due to pilot error; 29 of the 45 on board lost their lives, and the remaining 16 survived for 72 days by feeding on the dead.
- October 21 – Olympic Airways Flight 506, a NAMC YS-11 en route from Corfu, crashed into the sea and later sank, on approach to Athens; 37 of the 53 people on board were killed.
- October 27 – Air Inter Flight 696Y, a Vickers Viscount 724 en route from Lyon to Clemont-Ferrand, crashed near Noirétable, France, killing 60 of the 68 people on board.
- October 29 – Lufthansa Flight 615, a Boeing 727 en route from Damascus to Frankfurt, was hijacked by sympathizers of Black September who demanded the release of the three surviving perpetrators of the Munich massacre; the ensuing stand-off was eventually resolved and there were no casualties.
- October 30 – Aero Trasporti Italiani Flight 327, a Fokker F27 Friendship on a domestic flight from Naples to Bridinisi, with a stopover in Bari, crashed due to pilot error near Poggiorsini, in the Apulia region, killing all 27 people on board.
- November 10 – Southern Airways Flight 49, a McDonnell Douglas DC-9-15, was hijacked by three people. The plane went to many places and ended up diverted to Havana, Cuba, where hijackers were arrested by the Cuban authorities. All 38 occupants survived.
- November 15 – Ansett Airlines Flight 232, a Fokker F27 Friendship operating a domestic flight in Australia, was hijacked on approach to Alice Springs; after landing at the airport, the perpetrator fatally shot himself during a confrontation with the police.
- November 28 – Japan Air Lines Flight 446, a Douglas DC-8 operating an international flight from Copenhagen, Denmark, to Tokyo, Japan, via Moscow, USSR, stalled and crashed after rotation from Sheremetyevo International Airport, due to pilot error; 62 of the 76 people on board were killed.
- December 3 – Spantax Flight 275, a Convair 990 Coronado, crashed in Tenerife while taking off in almost zero visibility; all 155 passengers and crew were killed.

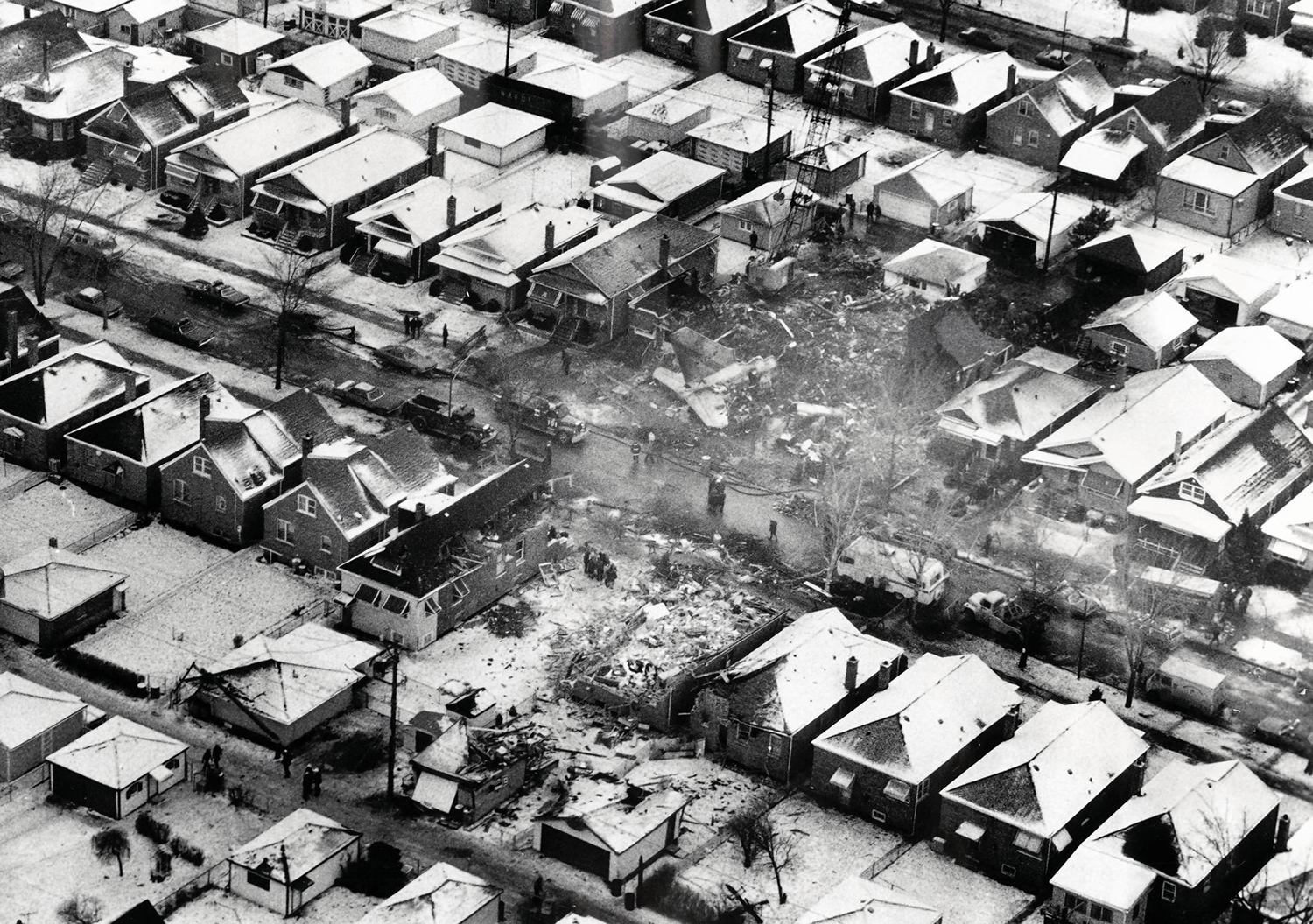
NTSB photo of the crash site of United Airlines Flight 553. (1972)

- December 8 – United Airlines Flight 553, a Boeing 737, crashed after aborting its landing attempt at Chicago Midway International Airport, killing 43 of 60 people on board and two people on the ground; one of the fatalities was Dorothy Hunt, wife of Watergate conspirator E. Howard Hunt. The crash was the first fatal crash involving the 737-200.
- December 8 – Pakistan International Airlines Flight 631, a Fokker F27, crashed into a mountain, halfway through its flight in Pakistan, killing all 31 passengers and crew.
- December 8 - Ethiopian Airlines Flight 708, a Boeing 720-060B, was involved in a hijacking incident when seven members of the Eritrean Liberation Front tried to gain control of the aircraft. During the process, some sky marshals on board the aircraft opened fire killing six of the seven hijackers. Also, a grenade from the hijackers exploded on board the aircraft, damaging some control systems. The aircraft managed to land back at Addis Ababa, Ethiopia. The seventh hijacker later died in hospital due to his injuries.
- December 20 – In the 1972 Chicago–O'Hare runway collision, Delta Air Lines Flight 954, a Convair CV-880, and North Central Airlines Flight 575, a McDonnell Douglas DC-9, collided on the runway due to ATC communication errors, killing 10 people and injuring 17.
- December 23 – Braathens SAFE Flight 239, a Fokker F-28 operating a domestic flight in Norway, crashed into terrain in Asker on approach to Oslo Airport, Fornebu, killing 40 of the 45 people on board.
- December 29 – Eastern Air Lines Flight 401, a Lockheed L-1011 TriStar flying from New York to Miami, crashed in the Florida Everglades when the crew was distracted by a faulty gear-down light, resulting in the deaths of 101 of the 176 people on board. This was the first crash of a widebody aircraft and the first loss of a Lockheed Tristar.
- December 31 – An American Express Leasing Douglas DC-7 crashed off the coast of Puerto Rico, while en route from San Juan to Managua. All five on board were killed.

=== 1973 ===
- January 2 – Pacific Western Airlines Flight 3801, a Boeing 707-321C on a cargo flight from Athens to Edmonton, crashed on approach to its destination. All five people on board were killed.
- January 21 – Aeroflot Flight 6263, an Antonov An-24, lost control for unknown reasons, broke up and crashed while on approach to Perm Airport, killing all 39 on board.
- January 22 – In the Kano air disaster, a Boeing 707 crashed while attempting to land at Kano International Airport in Nigeria, killing 176 of the 202 passengers and crew on board.
- January 29 – EgyptAir Flight 741 crashed in the Kyrenia mountain range in Northern Cyprus while on approach to Nicosia International Airport; all 37 on board died.
- February 19 – Aeroflot Flight 141, a Tupolev Tu-154, crashed short of the runway at Prague Ruzyně Airport for unknown reasons, killing 66 of 100 on board.
- February 21 – Libyan Arab Airlines Flight 114, a Boeing 727, strayed off course and was shot down by Israeli jets in the Sinai war zone, killing 108 of 113 people on board.
- February 24 – Aeroflot Flight 630, an Ilyushin Il-18, crashed 25 miles (40 km) from Ura-Tube, Tajikistan, due to loss of control as a result of pilot error, killing all 79 on board.
- February 28 – Aeroflot Flight X-167, a Yakovlev Yak-40, crashed shortly after takeoff, killing all 32 on board.
- March 3 – Balkan Bulgarian Airlines Flight 307, an Ilyushin Il-18, crashed short of the runway at Sheremetyevo International Airport, killing all 25 on board.
- March 5 – In the Nantes mid-air collision, an Iberia McDonnell Douglas DC-9 collided with a Spantax Convair CV-990. All 68 people on board the DC-9 were killed, while the CV-990 was able to make a successful emergency landing at Cognac – Châteaubernard Air Base.
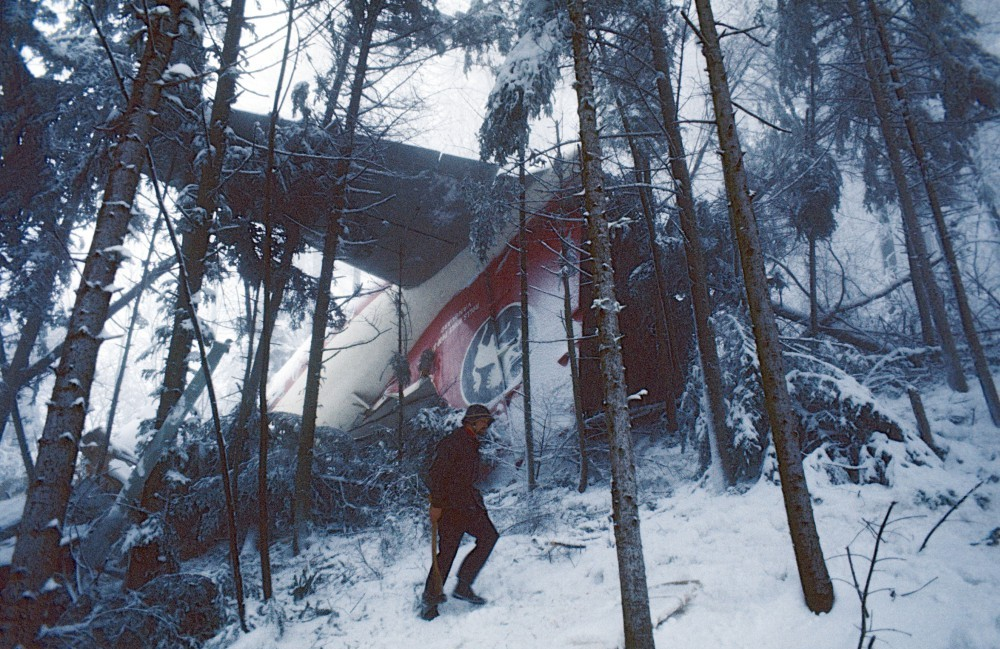
- Remains of Invicta International Airlines Flight 435
  April 10 – Invicta International Airlines Flight 435, a Vickers Vanguard 952 flying from Bristol Lulsgate to Basle, crashed into a hillside near Hochwald, Switzerland, then somersaulted and broke up, killing 108 with 37 survivors.
- April 23 – Aeroflot Flight 2420, a Tupolev Tu-104B, was hijacked by a man who demanded to go to Stockholm, Sweden. Due to lack of fuel, and no permission to fly to Stockholm being given by the Leningrad ATC, the crew decided to land at Leningrad. When the hijacker realized what was happening, he detonated a bomb 30 seconds before the aircraft landed. The hijacker and one crew member died.
- May 11 – Aeroflot Flight 6551, an Ilyushin Il-18, broke up and crashed 84 km (52 mi) south of Semipalatinsk (now Semey), Kazakhstan, following an unexplained loss of control; all 63 on board were killed.
- May 18 – Aeroflot Flight 109, a Tupolev Tu-104, was hijacked en route to Chita from Irkutsk; the hijacker detonated a bomb and the aircraft crashed east of Lake Baikal, killing all 81 on board.
- May 30 – SAM Colombia Flight 601, a Lockheed L-188 Electra, was hijacked by two football players. After negotiation and ineffective actions, they surrendered. All 88 occupants survived.
- May 31 – Indian Airlines Flight 440, a Boeing 737, crashed while on approach to Palam Airport in New Delhi, India. 48 of the 65 passengers and crew on board were killed in the accident.
- June 10 – In the 1973 Royal Nepal Airlines DHC-6 hijacking, a de Havilland Canada DHC-6 Twin Otter operated by Royal Nepal Airlines was hijacked after takeoff from Biratnagar Airport, Nepal. The hijackers forced the pilot to land in a grass field in Forbesganj, Bihar, India. All 19 occupants survived.
- June 20 – Aeroméxico Flight 229, a Douglas DC-9, crashed into the side of Las Minas Mountain while on approach to Lic. Gustavo Díaz Ordaz International Airport; all 27 on board were killed.
- June 30 – Aeroflot Flight 512, a Tupolev Tu-134, overran a runway while aborting takeoff at Amman Civil Airport, Jordan, before colliding with trees and a building. 2 crew members on board, plus 7 people in the building, were killed.
- July 11 – Varig Flight 820, a Boeing 707, experienced an onboard fire and crashed near Paris, France, killing 123 out of the 134 on board.
- July 22 – Pan Am Flight 816, a Boeing 707, crashed shortly after takeoff from Faa's International Airport, French Polynesia, killing 77 out of the 78 on board.
- July 23 – Japan Air Lines Flight 404, a Boeing 747, was hijacked after takeoff from Amsterdam Schiphol Airport in the Netherlands; one hijacker was killed, while the flight purser was injured by a grenade blast; after several days and multiple flight legs, the passengers were released in Benghazi, Libya, and the aircraft was blown up on the ground; this was the first loss of a Boeing 747-200.
- July 23 – Ozark Air Lines Flight 809, a Fairchild-Hiller FH-227, crashed short of the runway at St. Louis International Airport due to windshear from a thunderstorm, killing 38 of 44 on board.
- July 31 – Delta Air Lines Flight 723, a Douglas DC-9, descended prematurely and crashed on final approach to Boston Logan International Airport, killing all 89 on board; the probable cause was determined to be an unstabilized final approach by the flight crew.
- August 13 – Aviaco Flight 118, a Sud Caravelle en route from Madrid to A Coruña, crashed in Montrove 2 km from the airport, killing all 85 on board and one on the ground.
- August 18 – Aeroflot Flight A-13, an Antonov An-24, crashed near Baku, Azerbaijan, after striking a cable on an oil rig following an engine failure, killing 56 of the 64 on board. The accident remains the deadliest in Azerbaijan.
- August 27 – An Aerocondor Lockheed L-188 Electra struck a mountain after takeoff from Bogotá, killing all 42 on board.
- August 28 – TWA Flight 742, a Boeing 707, experienced severe porpoising oscillations during a descent over the Pacific Ocean near Los Angeles; all on board initially survived, but a passenger died two days later from injuries sustained in the accident.
- September 8 – World Airways Flight 802, a Douglas DC-8-63CF, crashed on approach into Cold Bay Airport, Alaska. All six occupants were killed.
- September 11 – JAT Airways Flight 769, a Sud Aviation Caravelle, crashed into Mt. Maganik near Kolašin, Montenegro, killing all 41 on board.
- September 27 – Texas International Airlines Flight 655, a Convair 600, crashed into Black Fork Mountain while avoiding thunderstorms, killing all 11 passengers and crew.
- September 30 – Aeroflot Flight 3932, a Tupolev Tu-104, crashed shortly after takeoff from Koltsovo Airport in Sverdlovsk (now Yekaterinburg), Russia, after the pilots became disorientated following an electrical failure; all 108 on board died.
- October 13 – Aeroflot Flight 964, a Tupolev Tu-104, crashed while on approach to Domodedovo International Airport, Moscow, Russia, after the pilots became disorientated following an electrical failure; all 122 on board died in the deadliest accident involving the Tu-104.
- November 2 – Aeroflot Flight 19, a Yakovlev Yak-40, was hijacked ten minutes before landing at Bryansk Airport, Russia. The aircraft was then diverted to Moscow's Vnukovo Airport where it was stormed by the authorities; one of the four hijackers was killed and a second committed suicide, while the other two hijackers survived, along with all passengers and crew.
- November 3 – National Airlines Flight 27, a McDonnell Douglas DC-10 with 128 on board, suffered an uncontained engine failure at 39,000 feet 65 miles (104 km) southwest of Albuquerque, New Mexico. Debris from the engine punctured the fuselage and a passenger was blown out of the aircraft, but the aircraft was able to land safely with no other casualties.
- November 3 – Pan Am Flight 160, a Boeing 707 operating a cargo flight, crashed after smoke in the cockpit prevented the crew from maintaining control of the aircraft while attempting an emergency landing at Boston Logan International Airport, Massachusetts; all three crew members died.
- November 25 – KLM Flight 861, a Boeing 747, was hijacked over Iraq. The hijackers forced the crew to land at several different airports, the last one being Dubai International Airport, where the hijackers surrendered to the authorities. All 264 people on board survived.
- December 16 – Aeroflot Flight 2022, a Tupolev Tu-124, crashed near Karacharovo, Russia, after entering a nosedive following a failure in the horizontal stabilizer, killing all 51 on board.
- December 17 – Iberia Flight 933, a Douglas DC-10, crash-landed on the runway of Boston Logan International Airport, Massachusetts, after colliding with the approach lighting system 500 metres (1,600 ft) short of the runway threshold. All 168 on board survived, but three occupants received serious injuries.
- December 17 – In the 1973 Rome airport attacks and hijacking, armed gunmen killed two people in the terminal, then firebombed Pan Am Flight 110, a Boeing 707, killing 30 inside the aircraft. The gunmen then hijacked Lufthansa Flight 303, a Boeing 737 en route to Munich, killing two more before landing and surrendering in Kuwait.
- December 22 – In the 1973 Royal Air Maroc Sud Aviation Caravelle crash, a Sud Aviation Caravelle operated by Sobelair crashed into Mount Mellaline near Tanger-Boukhalef Airport, Morocco, killing all 106 on board.

=== 1974 ===
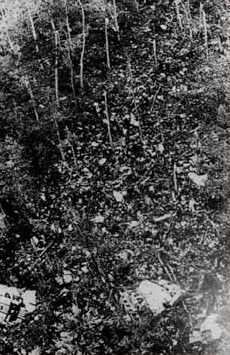
Aerial photograph of the crash site of Turkish Airlines Flight 981

- January 6 – Commonwealth Commuter Flight 317, a Beechcraft Model 99A, crashed short of the runway on approach to Johnstown–Cambria County Airport, Pennsylvania, following a premature descent, killing 12 of the 17 on board.
- January 26 – Turkish Airlines Flight 301, a Fokker F28-1000, stalled and crashed after takeoff from Izmir Cumaovasi Airport due to wing icing; of the 73 on board, only six survived.
- January 30 – Pan Am Flight 806, a Boeing 707-320B, crashed on approach to Pago Pago International Airport, American Samoa, due to pilot error after encountering a microburst 97 of 101 on board died.
- February 22 – Delta Air Lines Flight 523, a McDonnell Douglas DC-9-30, was hijacked by Samuel Byck, who planned to attempt to kill Richard Nixon. Byck killed a police officer on the ground before boarding the plane, where he shot both the pilots, killing one; Byck was subsequently shot by police, then killed himself.
- February 27 – In the Gambell Incident, the Antonov An-24 made an emergency in Gambell due to fuel exhuastion. All 15 occupants survived.
- March 3 – Turkish Airlines Flight 981, a McDonnell Douglas DC-10, crashed in the Ermenonville forest near Senlis, France, after the rear underfloor cargo door opened mid-flight; all 346 on board were killed.
- March 13 – Sierra Pacific Airlines Flight 802, a Convair CV-440, crashed shortly after takeoff from Eastern Sierra Regional Airport, near Bishop, California, while transporting a movie crew to Burbank. All 36 on board were killed.
- March 15 – Sterling Airways Flight 901, a Sterling Airways Sud Aviation Caravelle, suffered a landing gear failure at Mehrabad International Airport. The right wing contacted the runway, rupturing the fuel tank and starting a fire that killed 15 of 92 passengers; all four crew survived.
- April 18 – Court Line Flight 95, a BAC One-Eleven, collided with a Piper Aztec on the runway at London Luton Airport, killing the pilot of the Aztec; there were no casualties on board the One-Eleven, but the aircraft was substantially damaged; the Aztec was written off.
- April 22 – Pan Am Flight 812, a Boeing 707-320B, crashed into mountainous terrain 42.5 nautical miles (78.7 km) northwest of Denpasar, Bali, due to instrument failure and pilot error, killing all 107 on board.
- April 27 – An Aeroflot Ilyushin Il-18 crashed shortly after takeoff from Pulkovo Airport, Leningrad (now St. Petersburg), Russia, due to loss of control following engine failure; all 109 on board died.
- July 10 – An EgyptAir Tupolev Tu-154 crashed near Cairo International Airport during a training flight, killing all six crew members.
- September 8 – TWA Flight 841, a Boeing 707, broke up and plunged into the Ionian Sea after a bomb exploded in the cargo hold; all 88 on board died.
- September 11 – Eastern Air Lines Flight 212, a McDonnell Douglas DC-9, crashed on approach to Charlotte, North Carolina; 72 of 82 people on board were killed.
- September 15 – Air Vietnam Flight 706, a Boeing 727, was hijacked and crashed in Phan Rang, Vietnam, following an aborted landing; all 75 on board died.
- October 30 - Panarctic Oils Flight 416, a Lockheed L-188 Electra carrying Petro-Canada employees, crashed in the Byam Channel while en route from Edmonton to Rea Point; 32 of the 34 people on board were killed.
- November 20 – Lufthansa Flight 540 crashed shortly after takeoff in Nairobi, Kenya; 59 of 157 on board were killed. This was the first crash of a Boeing 747.
- December 1 – Northwest Airlines Flight 6231, a Boeing 727, stalled and crashed 12 minutes after takeoff from John F. Kennedy International Airport, New York, due to wing icing caused by pilot error, killing the three crew.
- December 1 – TWA Flight 514, a Boeing 727 inbound to Dulles International Airport, crashed into Mount Weather in Bluemont, Virginia, killing all 92 on board.
- December 4 – Martinair Flight 138, a Douglas DC-8 on a charter flight, crashed into a mountain on approach to Katunayake, Sri Lanka, for a refuelling stop; all the passengers – 182 Indonesian hajj pilgrims bound for Mecca – and all nine crew members died.
- December 22 – Avensa Flight 358, a McDonnell Douglas DC-9, suffered dual engine failure after takeoff and crashed near Maturín, Venezuela, killing all 75 on board.

=== 1975 ===
- January 9 – Golden West Airlines Flight 261, a de Havilland Twin Otter, collided with a Cessna 150 near Whittier, California, killing all 14 people in both aircraft.
- January 15 – Malev Flight 801A, an Ilyushin Il-18, entered a steep dive during the go-around as an effect of spatial disorientation, killing all 9 crew members - the only occupants.
- January 17 – A Sikorsky S-55 helicopter operated by Þyrluflug crashed due to wind conditions and overloading, while en route from Reykjavik and Vegamót. All seven people on board were killed.
- January 30 – Turkish Airlines Flight 345, a Fokker F-28, crashed into the Sea of Marmara after a missed approach; all 42 on board died, and the cause was never determined.
- February 3 – 197 people fell ill on board a Japan Air Lines Boeing 747 en route from Anchorage, Alaska, to Copenhagen, Denmark, after consuming an in-flight meal contaminated with Staphylococci; 144 people were hospitalized, making it the largest food poisoning incident on board a commercial airliner.
- March 31 – A charter Pilatus PC-6 Porter operated by Royal Nepal Airlines crashed near Boudha Stupa, Nepal, while en route from Kathmandu to Phaplu. All five people on board died, including the wife and daughter of Sir Edmund Hillary, for whom the flight was chartered.
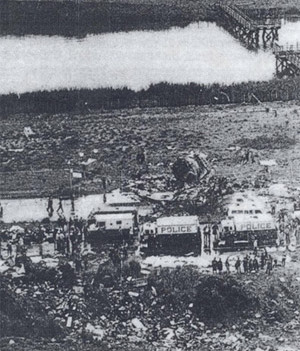
- Crash site of Eastern Airlines Flight 66
  June 24 – Eastern Air Lines Flight 66, a Boeing 727, encountered wind shear on final approach and struck approach lights at John F. Kennedy International Airport, New York, killing 113 of 124 people on board.
- July 31 – Far Eastern Air Transport Flight 134, a Vickers Viscount 837, crashed on approach after being hit by a downdraft, killing 27 out of 75 occupants.
- August 3 – The Agadir air disaster: an Air Maroc-operated Boeing 707 owned by Royal Jordanian Airlines crashed while on approach to Agadir, Morocco, due to pilot error; all 188 on board died. This was the worst accident involving the Boeing 707.
- August 20 – ČSA Flight 540, an Ilyushin Il-62, crashed while on approach to Damascus, Syria; 126 of the 128 passengers and crew on board died in the accident.
- August 30 – Wien Air Alaska Flight 99, a Fairchild F-27, crashed into Seuvokuk Mountain, Alaska, while on approach to Gambell Airport, killing 10 of 32 on board.
- September 1 – Interflug Flight 1107, a Tupolev Tu-134, crashed while on approach to Leipzig, killing 27 of 34 on board.
- September 24 – Garuda Indonesian Airways Flight 150, a Fokker F-28, crashed in foggy weather while on approach to Palembang, Indonesia; 25 of 61 on board died, plus one person on the ground.
- September 30 – Malév Flight 240, a Tupolev Tu-154, crashed on approach near Lebanon, killing all 60 people on board.
- October 5 – Aerolineas Argentinas Flight 706, a Boeing 737-287C, was hijacked as a cover-up for 30 guerillas to escape from the failure of Operation Primicia. No one of the 108 people died.
- October 6 – Connair Flight 1263, a de Havilland DH-114 Heron, crashed near Cairns airport, Australia, after a flight from Mount Isa. All 11 people on board were killed.
- October 22 – Aeroflot Flight L-98, a Yakovlev Yak-40, crashed on approach into buildings due to poor visibility, killing all 6 on board, alongside 5 others on the ground.
- October 30 – Inex-Adria Aviopromet Flight 450, a McDonnell Douglas DC-9, crashed on approach in a Prague suburb, killing 79 of 120 on board.
- November 12 – Overseas National Airways Flight 032, a McDonnell Douglas DC-10-30CF, initiated a rejected takeoff after being struck by a large flock of gulls. All 139 on board survived, but 32 people were injured due to the post-crash fire.
- November 26 – In the 1975 Michigan mid-air incident, a McDonnell Douglas DC-10-10 (as American Airlines Flight 182) nearly collided with a Lockheed L-1011 Tristar (as TWA Flight 37). The pilot of Flight 182, Guy Eby, lowered the plane after realising the danger, saving all 319 occupants.

=== 1976 ===
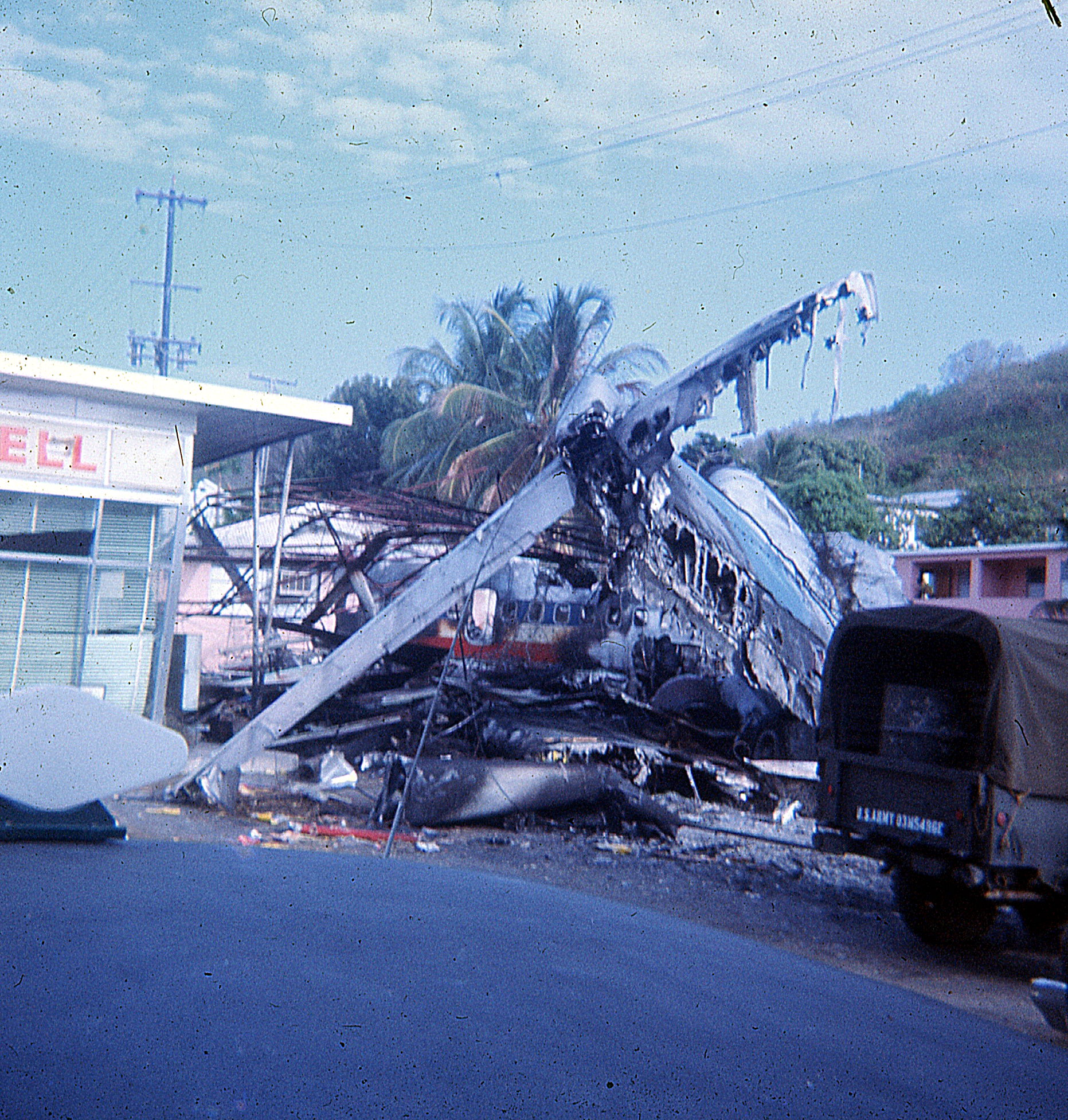
Wreckage of American Airlines Flight 625 near a gas station

- January 1 – Middle East Airlines Flight 438, a Boeing 720, crashed in Saudi Arabia after a bomb exploded in the forward baggage compartment, killing all 81 people on board.
- January 3 – Aeroflot Flight 2003, a Tupolev Tu-124, crashed just after takeoff from Vnukovo Airport, due to instrument failure, killing all 61 passengers and crew on board and one person on the ground.
- January 15 – In the Taxi Aereo el Venado Douglas DC-4 accident, a Douglas DC-4 crashed into a mountain in Colombia, killing all 13 on board.
- February 9 – Aeroflot Flight 3739, a Tupolev Tu-104, crashed on takeoff from Irkutsk after the aircraft rolled to the right, killing 24 of 114 on board.
- March 6 – Aeroflot Flight 909, an Ilyushin Il-18, crashed near Voronezh due to loss of control following an electrical failure, killing all 111 on board and 7 on the ground.
- April 5 - Alaska Airlines Flight 60, a Boeing 727, overshot the runway at Ketchikan International Airport due to pilot error. One person was killed and 49 were injured.
- April 27 – American Airlines Flight 625, a Boeing 727, crashed on approach to St. Thomas, Virgin Islands, killing 37 of 88 people on board.
- May 15 – Aeroflot Flight 1802, an Antonov An-24, crashed near Viktorovka, Chernigov Region, due to loss of control following an unexplained rudder deflection, killing all 52 on board.
- May 21 – Six hijackers stormed the BAC One-Eleven-527FK operated as Philippine Airlines Flight 116, and then diverted to Zamboanga Airport in the Philippines. Negotiation continued until May 23, when the authorities stormed the plane. Ten passengers and three of the hijackers were killed.
- June 1 – Aeroflot Flight 418, a Tupolev Tu-154, crashed into a mountainside on the island of Bioko in Equatorial Guinea for reasons unknown; all 46 on board died.
- June 4 – Air Manila Flight 702, a Lockheed L-188 Electra, crashed shortly after takeoff from NAS Agana, Guam, due to engine failure and pilot error, killing all 45 on board; one person on the ground also died when a car was struck by the aircraft.
- June 6 – In the 1976 Sabah Air GAF Nomad crash, a GAF N-22B Nomad crashed into the sea on approach into Kota Kinabalu International Airport, Malaysia. All 11 passengers and crew were killed. Several local political leaders were on board at the time.
- June 27 – Air France Flight 139, an Airbus A300, was hijacked from Athens by two Palestinians and two Germans who diverted the flight to Libya and then to Uganda, where the plane was met by pro-Palestinian forces from Idi Amin's government; Israeli troops eventually stormed the airport in Operation Entebbe, killing hijackers and Ugandan soldiers and freeing all but three of the hostages; Israeli colonel Yonatan Netanyahu was also killed in the raid.
- July 28 – ČSA Flight 001, an Ilyushin Il-18, crashed near Bratislava in Czechoslovakia, killing 76 of 78 people on board.
- August 15 – SAETA Flight 232, a Vickers Viscount 785D, went missing en route from Quito to Cuenca, Ecuador; all four crew members and 55 passengers were killed, but the site of the crash remained unknown for 26 years until its discovery in October 2002 by climbers on the eastern face of the stratovolcano Chimborazo.
- August 23 – EgyptAir Flight 321 was hijacked by three armed terrorists. The plane landed in Luxor where the aircraft was stormed. Everyone survived.
- September 9 – In the 1976 Anapa mid-air collision, Aeroflot Flight 7957, an Antonov An-24, collided with Aeroflot Flight S-31, a Yakovlev Yak-40, over the Black Sea off Anapa due to ATC and crew errors, killing all 70 on board both aircraft.
- September 10 – In the 1976 Zagreb mid-air collision, British Airways Flight 476, a Hawker Siddeley Trident, and Inex-Adria Aviopromet Flight 550, a McDonnell Douglas DC-9, collided near Zagreb, Yugoslavia, killing all 176 people on board both aircraft.
- September 10 – TWA Flight 355, a Boeing 727-231, was hijacked by five members of "Fighters for Free Croatia". All 46 occupants (including five hijackers) survived, but a NYPD officer was killed.
- September 10 – An Indian Airlines Boeing 737-200 was hijacked during the Kashmiri war, all 83 occupants survived.
- September 19 – Turkish Airlines Flight 452, a Boeing 727, crashed into a hillside near Karatepe, Turkey, while on approach to Antalya Airport; all 154 passengers and crew died.
- October 6 – Cubana de Aviación Flight 455, a Douglas DC-8, was bombed by anti-Castro militants and crashed near Bridgetown, Barbados, killing all 73 people on board.
- October 12 – Indian Airlines Flight 171, a Sud Caravelle, crashed while attempting an emergency landing at Bombay Airport; all 95 passengers and crew on board were killed.
- October 13 – A Lloyd Aéreo Boliviano Boeing 707 crashed on takeoff from El Trompillo airport, Bolivia. All three crew members were killed, along with 88 people on the ground.
- November 23 – Olympic Airways Flight 830, a NAMC YS-11A, crashed into a mountain in Greece in low visibility, killing all 50 on board.
- November 28 – Aeroflot Flight 2415, a Tupolev Tu-104, crashed shortly after takeoff from Sheremetyevo International Airport, due to crew disorientation following artificial horizon failure, killing all 73 on board.
- December 17 – Aeroflot Flight N-36, an Antonov An-24, crashed on approach to Kiev-Zhuilany Airport, killing 48 of 55 on board.
- December 25 – EgyptAir Flight 864, a Boeing 707, crashed into an industrial complex near Bangkok, Thailand, due to pilot error; all 52 on board were killed as well as another 19 on the ground.

=== 1977 ===
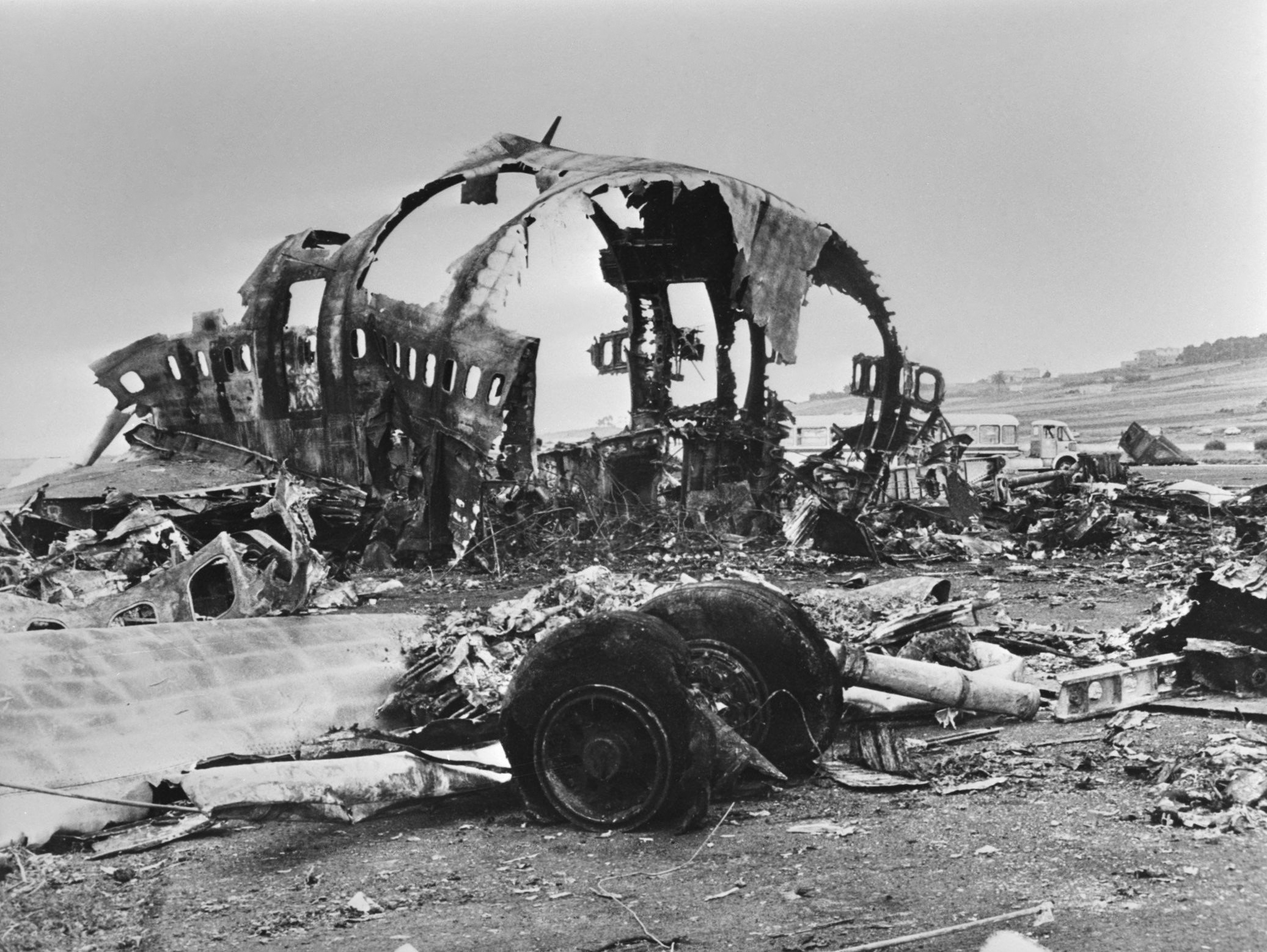
Wreckage of KLM 4805

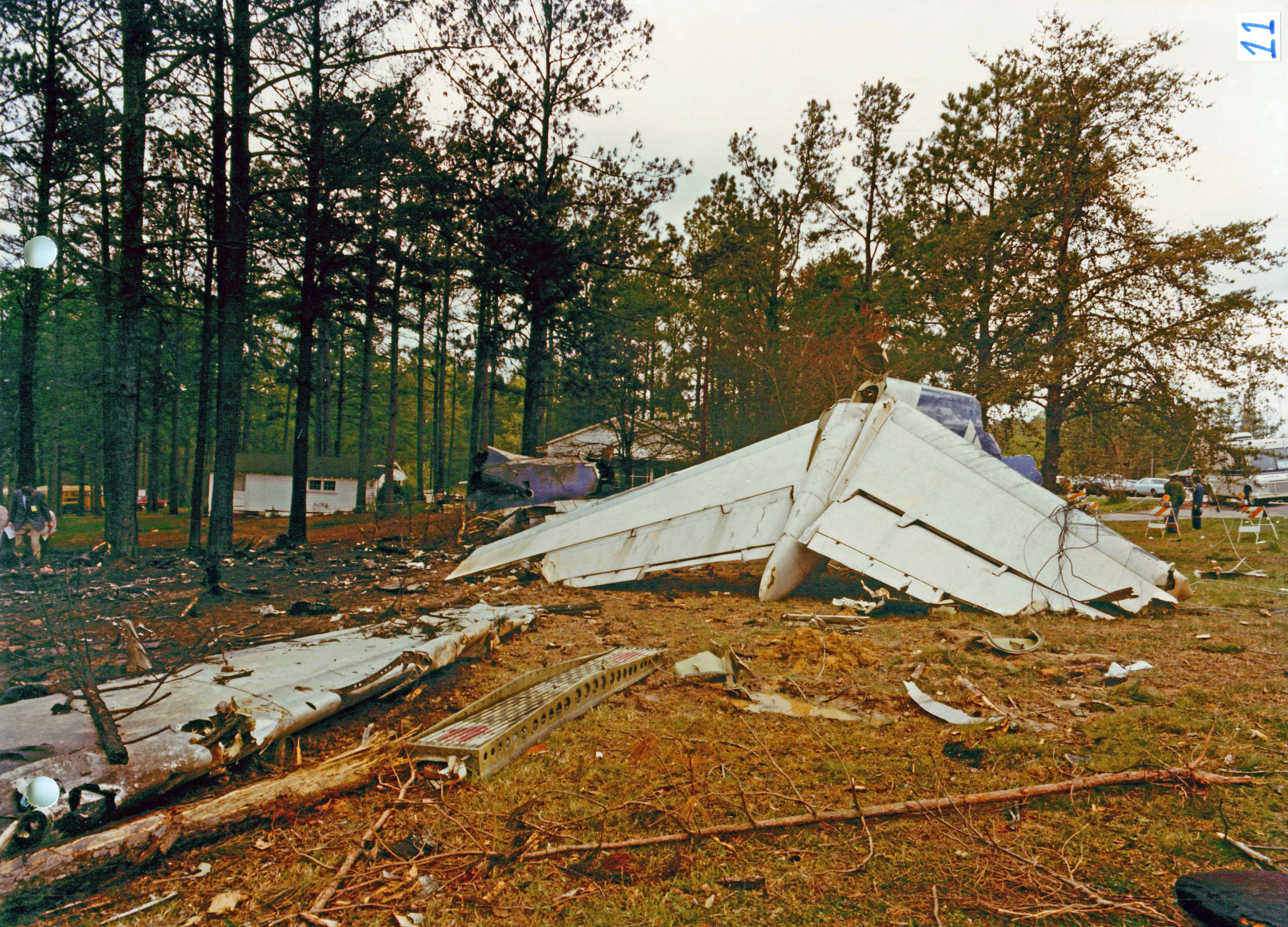
Remains of Southern Airways Flight 242

- January 2 – ČSA Flight 897, a Tupolev Tu-134, collided its right wing with a tailfin of an Il-18 during its descend. No one of the 64 on board were killed.
- January 13 – Aeroflot Flight 3843, a Tupolev Tu-104 operating a flight from Khabarovsk Novy Airport, Soviet Union, to Almaty Airport in Kazakhstan, crashed in a field just short of its destination due to an engine fire; all 90 people on board were killed.
- January 13 - Japan Air Lines Cargo Flight 1045, a Douglas DC-8 operated by Japan Airlines, stalled and crashed after takeoff from Anchorage International Airport. The plane was heading to Tokyo Haneda Airport. All five people on board were killed.
- January 15 – Linjeflyg Flight 618, a Skyline Vickers Viscount 838 operating a multi-leg domestic flight in Sweden, crashed in the district of Kälvesta, western Stockholm, due to atmospheric icing, killing all 22 people on board.
- February 11 – ČSA Flight 475, an Avia 14, crashed while on approach to Bratislava Airport; 4 or the 5 people on board were killed.
- February 15 – Aeroflot Flight 5003, an Ilyushin Il-18 operating a domestic flight in the western Soviet Union, crashed due to pilot error after a missed approach to Mineralnye Vody Airport, killing 77 of the 98 people on board.
- March 17 – A British Airtours Boeing 707 crashed due to engine failure after takeoff. All four occupants survived.
- March 27 – In the Tenerife airport disaster, two Boeing 747s, KLM Flight 4805 and Pan Am Flight 1736, collided on the runway at Los Rodeos Airport in heavy fog; 583 of the 644 people on board the two aircraft were killed; all 61 of the survivors suffered injuries. This was the deadliest accident in the history of commercial aviation.
- March 29 – Merpati Nusantara Airlines Flight 516, a de Havilland DHC-6-30, crashed into a mountain, killing 13 of the 23 on board.
- March 30 – Aeroflot Flight H-925, a Yakovlev Yak-40, collided with a concrete pole and banked hard before crashing into the ground, killing all 8 out of 28 people
- April 4 – Southern Airways Flight 242, a McDonnell Douglas DC-9 flying from northwest Alabama to Atlanta, Georgia, crash-landed on a highway near New Hope, Georgia, after encountering dual engine failure in a thunderstorm; 63 of the 85 people on board were killed, as well as nine on the ground.
- April 12 – Delta Air Lines Flight 1080, a Lockheed L-1011 Tristar operating a domestic flight in California, United States, experienced a loss of pitch control during takeoff from Los Angeles International Airport, due to a malfunctioning elevator; the aircraft was able to land safely with no casualties.
- May 13 – LOT Polish Airlines Flight 6883, a Antonov An-12, crashed into terrain while attempting to land at Beirut International Airport in poor weather conditions; all nine crew members were killed.
- May 14 – A Dan-Air Boeing 707 crashed near Lusaka Airport, Zambia, after a multi-leg flight from London's Heathrow Airport, via Athens and Nairobi, due to structural failure; the one passenger and five crew members were killed.
- May 27 – Aeroflot Flight 331, an Ilyushin Il-62 operating a multi-leg flight from Moscow, Soviet Union, to Havana, Cuba, crashed due to pilot error while on approach to José Martí International Airport, killing all but two of the 69 people on board.
- July 10 – Two people hijacked a Tupolev Tu-134, registered CCCP-65639. The hijackers demanded to go to Stockholm, Sweden, but landed at Helsinki, Finland, due to fuel starvation. All 75 occupants (including 2 hijackers) survived.
- July 20 – Aeroflot Flight B-2, an Avia 14, crashed shortly after takeoff from Vitim Airport, Russia, due to pilot and ATC errors; of the 40 on board, only one passenger survived.
- September 21 – Malév Flight 203, a Tupolev Tu-134 operating a passenger flight from Istanbul to Budapest with a scheduled stop in Bucharest, crashed near Otopeni Airport in Bucharest, killing 29 people of the 53 on board.
- September 27 – Japan Airlines Flight 715, a McDonnell Douglas DC-8 operating a multi-leg flight from Tokyo to Singapore, crashed into a hillside due to pilot error while on approach to Sultan Abdul Aziz Shah Airport in Malaysia, killing 34 of the 79 people on board.
- September 28 – Japan Airlines Flight 472, a McDonnell Douglas DC-8 bound for Tokyo, was hijacked by Japanese Red Army (JRA) militants shortly after departing from Bombay, India, and forced to land in Dhaka, Bangladesh; the hijackers' demands were eventually met, and all 151 passengers and crew were released unharmed. Among the five hijackers (who also survived), four years before Flight 472, Osamu Maruoka also hijacked a Boeing 747-246B operated as Japan Air Lines Flight 404.
- October 13 – Lufthansa Flight 181, a Boeing 737 flying from Mallorca to Germany, was hijacked over the Mediterranean Sea by members of the PFLP (a Palestinian revolutionary organization) who killed the pilot; the aircraft eventually landed in Mogadishu where it was stormed by German police commandos; three of the hijackers were killed, while the fourth was captured, and there were no other fatalities.
- October 13 – The cargo hatch of Aeroflot Flight 75, a Yakovlev Yak-40, unexpectedly opened during cruising, ejecting two passengers. The plane landed with 20 survivors remaining.
- October 20 – A Convair CV-240 chartered by Lynyrd Skynyrd crashed into a heavily wooded swamp in Amite County, Mississippi, United States, while en route from Greenville, South Carolina, to Baton Rouge, Louisiana, due to fuel exhaustion; four of the 24 passengers and both crew members were killed.
- October 29 – Vietnam Civil Aviation Flight 509, a Douglas DC-3, was hijacked by four armed Vietnamese hijackers seeking asylum in Singapore. The flight firstly diverted to U-Tapao Air Base, then landed at Seletar Air Base where hijackers surrendered after negotiating with Singapore officials for five hours. Of the 36 occupants, 2 crew members were killed in the first aircraft hijacking on a Vietnam Airlines's aircraft, and also the first aircraft hijacking after the Fall of Saigon in 1975.
- November 19 – TAP Portugal Flight 425, a Boeing 727 operating a multi-leg flight from Belgium to Portugal, plunged over a steep bank and burst into flames after overshooting the runway at Madeira Airport, due to pilot error, killing 131 of the 164 people on board.
- November 21 – Austral Líneas Aéreas Flight 9, a BAC One-Eleven 420EL, crashed into a mountain at Cerro Pichileufú, Argentina, killing 46 out of 79 people on board.
- December 2 – A Libyan Arab Airlines Tupolev Tu-154 crashed near Benghazi, Libya, due to fuel exhaustion, while en route from King Abdulaziz International Airport, Saudi Arabia, to Benina International Airport in Libya; 59 of the 165 people on board lost their lives.
- December 4 – Malaysian Airline System Flight 653, a Boeing 737 operating a flight from Penang to Kuala Lumpur, Malaysia, crashed into a swamp near Tanjung Kupang, Johor, as a result of a failed hijacking attempt; all 100 people on board were killed.
- December 13 – Air Indiana Flight 216, a Douglas DC-3 carrying the Evansville University Purple Aces basketball team on a charter flight from Evansville, Indiana, to Nashville, Tennessee, crashed shortly after takeoff due to overloading and pilot error, killing all 29 passengers and crew.
- December 18 – United Airlines Flight 2860, a McDonnell Douglas DC-8 flying from San Francisco, California, to Chicago, Illinois, in the United States, crashed in the Wasatch mountain range in Utah, killing the three crew.
- December 18 – SA de Transport Aérien Flight 730, a Sud Aviation SE-210 Caravelle operating a flight from Geneva, Switzerland, to Madeira, Portugal, crashed into the sea while on final approach to its destination, due to pilot error, killing 36 of the 57 people on board.
- December 19 – A Vieques Air Link Britten-Norman crashed en route from the US Virgin Islands to Puerto Rico, killing five of the 10 people on board.

=== 1978 ===
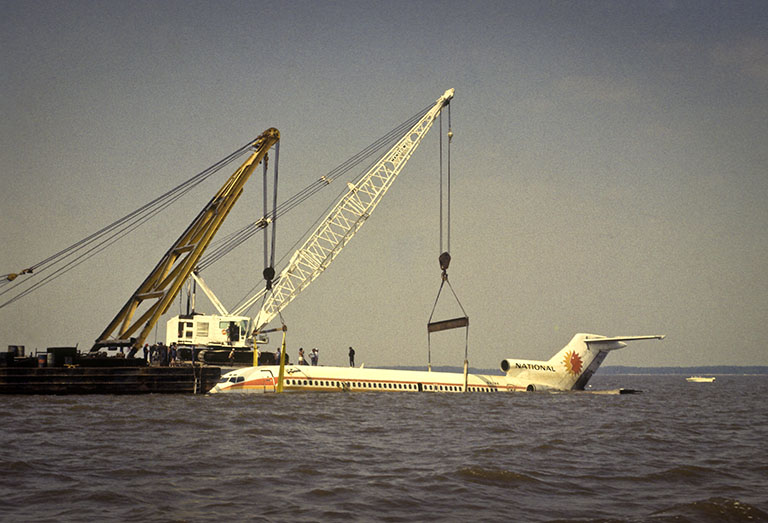
National Airlines Flight 193 being recovered from Escambia Bay

- January 1 – Air India Flight 855, a Boeing 747, crashed into the Arabian Sea as a result of instrument malfunction and pilot error, killing all 213 passengers and crew.
- February 11 – Pacific Western Airlines Flight 314, a Boeing 737-200 arriving from Edmonton, crashed at Cranbrook Airport, Canada, after one thrust reverser did not fully stow following an aborted landing, killing 43 of the 49 people on board.
- March 1 – Continental Airlines Flight 603, a McDonnell Douglas DC-10, crashed on takeoff from Los Angeles International Airport after a tire blew out on the left main landing gear, causing it to collapse; of 200 on board, two died at the time and two others died of their injuries three months later.
- March 3 – A Línea Aeropostal Venezolana Hawker Siddeley HS 748 crashed on departure from Simón Bolívar International Airport, Venezuela, due to a possible instrument failure; all 46 on board were killed.
- March 3 – Iberia Flight 565, a Douglas DC-8, overran the runway and crashed into a ravine, injuring 70 of the 221 on board, but no one died.
- March 9 – A man tried to hijack China Airlines Flight 831, a Boeing 737-200 en route from Kaohsiung to Hong Kong. The plane landed safely in Hong Kong; among the 101 on board, the only fatality was the hijacker.
- March 13 – A man claiming to have a bomb hijacked United Airlines Flight 696. The plane first landed at Oakland, California, and the passengers and cabin crew were released. The plane then flew to Denver, Colorado, where the hijacker surrendered. All 75 occupants survived.
- March 16 – Balkan Bulgarian Airlines Flight 107, a Tupolev Tu-134, crashed near the village of Gabare, Bulgaria, killing all 73 people on board.
- April 20 – Korean Air Lines Flight 902, a Boeing 707, was shot down by Soviet fighter planes; the plane crash-landed near the Soviet Union's border with Finland; two of the 109 people on board were killed; the rest were subsequently released.
- May 8 – National Airlines Flight 193, a Boeing 727, on approach to Pensacola, Florida, United States, ditched in Escambia Bay, as a result of pilot error; three passengers out of 58 people on board drowned.
- May 19 – Aeroflot Flight 6709, a Tupolev Tu-154, crashed in a field near Maksatikha, Russia, after all three engines failed due to fuel starvation, killing four of 134 on board.
- May 23 – A Tupolev Tu-144D crash-landed during a test flight. The aircraft experienced an in-flight fire due to a fuel leak, which also caused two engines to shut down. With another engine having failed, the plane made a belly landing in a field near Yegoryevsk, killing two out of eight occupants.
- June 26 – Air Canada Flight 189, a McDonnell Douglas DC-9, crashed on takeoff in Toronto, Ontario, Canada, because of tire failure; two of the 107 passengers and crew on board died.
- June 26 – Helikopter Service Flight 165, a Sikorsky S-61, crashed into the North Sea while en route to Statfjord oil field, due to a fatigue failure of a rotor, killing all 18 on board.
- June 28 – Vietnam Civil Aviation Flight 501, a Douglas DC-4, was hijacked by four men armed with Makarov pistols, knives and grenades. The hijackers engaged in a gunfight with the crew and security personnel. The plane safely landed at Da Nang International Airport.. Of the 67 onboard, 4 hijackers died (3 during the gunfight and 1 while taxiing) in the second hijacking of a Vietnam Airlines plane.
- August 9 – Olympic Airways Flight 411, a Boeing 747-200, nearly crashed in downtown Athens following an uncontained engine failure during takeoff. The plane regained enough speed to return safely to Ellinikon International Airport, and none of the 418 passengers or crew suffered serious injuries.
- August 30 – In the LOT Polish Airlines Flight 165 hijacking, two East German citizens hijacked a Tupolev Tu-134 and forced it to land at Tempelhof Airport; there were no casualties to the 63 passengers on board.
- September 3 – Air Rhodesia Flight 825 from Kariba to Salisbury was shot down by an SA-7 surface-to-air missile; 18 of the 56 passengers initially survived the emergency landing; 10 were subsequently killed by Zimbabwe People's Revolutionary Army (ZIPRA) militants.
- September 7 - An Air Ceylon HS 748 was bombed on the ground at Jaffna Airport. All three crew members on board survived.
- September 25 – Pacific Southwest Airlines Flight 182, a Boeing 727, collided with a Cessna 172 over San Diego, California, United States; all 135 on board the airliner, both pilots of the Cessna, and seven people on the ground were killed, making this the worst aviation disaster in California history, and the deadliest mid-air collision in North America.
- September 26 – Air Caribbean Flight 309, a Beechcraft Model 18, crashed on approach to San Juan, Puerto Rico, due to wake turbulence caused by an L-1011. All six people on board were killed.
- September 30 – Finnair Flight 405 was hijacked during a domestic flight from Helsinki to Oulu. The Sud Aviation Caravelle was flown to Amsterdam in the Netherlands where, after being paid, the hijacker released all 49 people on board.
- October 7 – Aeroflot Flight 1080, a Yakovlev Yak-40, crashed shortly after takeoff from Koltsovo Airport, due to an engine failure caused by ice ingestion, killing all 38 on board.
- November 15 – Icelandic Airlines Flight 001, a Douglas DC-8 on a charter flight, crashed into a coconut plantation while on approach to Katunayake, Sri Lanka, for a refuelling stop; 183 out of 262 people on board were killed.
- December 4 – Rocky Mountain Airways Flight 217, a de Havilland Canada DHC-6 Twin Otter 300, crashed near Buffalo Pass, Colorado, after encountering severe weather conditions. Two out of the 22 on board were killed.
- December 17 – Indian Airlines Flight 403, a Boeing 737-2A8, overshot the runway after entering a stall during takeoff, killing one out of 132 on board and three more on the ground.
- December 20 – Indian Airlines Flight 410, a Boeing 737-200, was hijacked by two people who claimed to be members of the Indian Youth Congress. None of the 132 occupants (including the two hijackers) died.
- December 21 – Robin Oswald hijacked TWA Flight 541 in order to free Garrett Brock Trapnell. He then surrendered after negotiations, and all 87 on board survived.
- December 23 – Alitalia Flight 4128, a McDonnell Douglas DC-9-32, crashed into the Tyrrhenian Sea when on approach to Palermo International Airport, Italy. Of the 129 passengers and crew, 108 died.
- December 28 – United Airlines Flight 173, a Douglas DC-8, ran out of fuel while circling near Portland, Oregon, United States, as the crew investigated a light indicating a problem with the landing gear; the plane crashed in a suburban area damaging two unoccupied houses, killing 10 and injuring 24 of the 181 on board.

=== 1979 ===
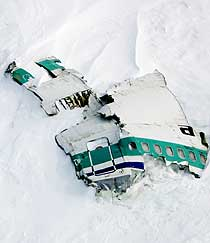
A part of the fuselage of Air New Zealand Flight 901

- January 15 – Aeroflot Flight 7502, an Antonov An-24B bound for Minsk-1 Airport, entered a stall and crashed into a field, killing 13 of the 14 occupants.
- January 30 – Varig Flight 967, a Boeing 707 bound for Rio de Janeiro–Galeão International Airport, disappeared over the Pacific Ocean 125 miles (201 km) after takeoff from Narita International Airport, Japan; the cause remains unknown, as neither survivors (six-man flight crew) nor wreckage have ever been found.
- February 7 – Vietnam Civil Aviation Flight 226, an Antonov An-24, carrying 36 people, was hijacked by 6 people to take refuge. A lieutenant killed 4 hijackers and the other two surrendered, ending the hijack
- February 12 – Air Rhodesia Flight 827, a Vickers Viscount on a flight between Kariba and Salisbury, was shot down shortly after takeoff by Zimbabwe People's Revolutionary Army militants using an SA-7 (Strela 2) surface-to-air missile in similar circumstances to Flight 825 five months earlier; all 55 passengers and four crew were killed.
- February 17 – Air New Zealand Flight 4374, a Fokker F-27 Friendship, crashed while on approach into Auckland International Airport, New Zealand. The captain and one passenger were killed.
- March 13 – Alia Royal Jordanian Airlines Flight 600, a Boeing 727, crashed following a missed approach at Doha International Airport, Qatar; 44 of the 64 on board were killed.
- March 17 – Aeroflot Flight 1691, a Tupolev Tu-104, crashed near Vnukovo International Airport while attempting to make an emergency landing after a fire alarm was reported; 58 of 119 on board died.
- March 26 – An Interflug Ilyushin Il-18 crashed on takeoff from Luanda, Angola, killing all 10 people on board.
- March 29 – Quebecair Flight 255, a Fairchild F-27 bound for Montreal, crashed minutes after takeoff from Quebec City as it was attempting to return to the airport following the explosion of its number two engine, killing 17 of the 24 people on board.
- April 4 – TWA Flight 841, a Boeing 727, went into a dive over Saginaw, Michigan, plunging 34,000 feet (10,000 m) in altitude within 63 seconds. The plane made an emergency landing in Detroit after the first officer regained control of the plane at 5,000 feet (1,500 m); all 89 passengers and crew survived
- April 23 – SAETA Flight 011, a Vickers Viscount, crashed in a mountainous region of Pastaza, Ecuador, killing all 57 people on board.
- May 25 – American Airlines Flight 191, a McDonnell Douglas DC-10, crashed upon takeoff from O'Hare International Airport after its left engine detached from the wing, killing all 271 on board and two on the ground in the worst single-aircraft accident on U.S. soil.
- May 30 – Downeast Flight 46, a de Havilland Canada DHC-6 Twin Otter, crashed on approach into Knox County Regional Airport, Maine. Of the 18 occupants, 17 were killed.
- June 17 – Air New England Flight 248, a de Havilland Canada DHC-6 Twin Otter, crashed near Camp Greenough, Massachusetts, while on approach to Barnstable Municipal Airport, killing the pilot.
- June 20 – American Airlines Flight 293, a Boeing 727, was hijacked shortly before it landed in Chicago. After letting the passengers and most of the crew members go, the hijacker forced the remaining crew members to fly back to New York City, where he demanded and received a Boeing 707 to fly him initially to Johannesburg, South Africa, but later to Ireland. After arriving at Shannon Airport, he surrendered to the Irish authorities.
- July 11 – A Garuda Indonesian Airways Fokker F-28 struck a mountain while on approach to Medan, Indonesia, killing all 61 on board.
- July 26 – Lufthansa Cargo Flight 527, a Boeing 707, crashed into a mountain shortly after takeoff from Rio de Janeiro, Brazil, killing all three crew members.
- July 31 – Dan-Air Flight 0034, a Hawker Siddeley HS 748, failed to become airborne at Sumburgh Airport, Scotland, due to a maintenance error, killing 17 of 44 on board.
- August 11 – The 1979 Dniprodzerzhynsk mid-air collision between two Aeroflot Tupolev Tu-134s killed 178.
- August 29 – Aeroflot Flight 5484, a Tupolev Tu-124, broke up in mid-air after experiencing loss of control due to an unexplained release of the flaps, killing all 63 people on board.
- September 14 – Aero Trasporti Italiani Flight 12, a Douglas DC-9, crashed into a rocky mountainside during an attempted landing at Cagliari-Elmas Airport, Italy, killing all 31 people on board.
- October 7 – Swissair Flight 316, a Douglas DC-8-62, crashed after overshooting the runway at Athens-Ellinikon International Airport, killing 14 of the 154 passengers and crew.
- October 31 – Western Airlines Flight 2605, a McDonnell Douglas DC-10, struck a vehicle on a closed runway in dense fog at Mexico City, Mexico; 72 of the 88 on board died.
- November 11 – Transportes Aéreos Españoles Flight 297, a Sud Aviation Caravelle flying from Salzburg to Las Palmas, was forced to make an emergency landing in Valencia after the crew reportedly spotted a UFO on a collision course with the plane. All 109 passengers of the plane were unharmed.
- November 15 – American Airlines Flight 444, a Boeing 727, took off with a bomb planted in the cargo hold by the Unabomber. The bomb failed to detonate, instead giving off large quantities of smoke. Twelve passengers were treated for smoke inhalation, and all 78 on board survived.
- November 26 – Pakistan International Airlines Flight 740, a Boeing 707, crashed after a fire in the cabin in Jeddah, Saudi Arabia; all 145 passengers and 11 crew died.
- November 28 – Air New Zealand Flight 901, a McDonnell Douglas DC-10, crashed into Mount Erebus, Antarctica, during a sightseeing flight, killing all 257 people on board; this crash is also known as the Mount Erebus Disaster.
- December 23 – A Turkish Airlines Fokker F28 crashed on a hillside near Kuyumcuköy, Ankara, Turkey, while on approach to Esenboğa Airport; of the 45 on board, only four survived.

== 1980s ==
=== 1980 ===
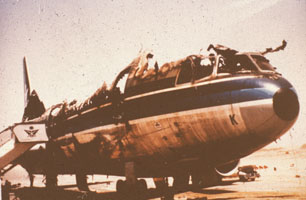
The burnt out remains of Saudia Flight 163

- January 21 – Iran Air Flight 291, a Boeing 727, crashed in the Alborz Mountains near Tehran, Iran, amid a snowstorm, on approach to Mehrabad International Airport, killing all 128 people on board.
- February 16 – Redcoat Air Cargo Flight 103, a Bristol Britannia, crashed shortly after takeoff from Boston Logan International Airport, Massachusetts, due to atmospheric icing, killing 7 of the 8 people on board.
- February 21 – Advance Airlines Flight 4210, a Beechcraft Super King Air 200, crashed shortly after takeoff from Sydney Airport, Australia, following a failure of one engine due to water in the fuel, killing all 13 people on board.
- February 27 – China Airlines Flight 811, a Boeing 707, landed short of the runway at Manila International Airport and caught fire. Two of the 135 passengers and crew were killed.
- March 1 – Aeroflot Flight 3324, a Tupolev Tu-154A, landed hard at Orenburg Airport and broke into parts. All 161 survived.
- March 14 – LOT Polish Airlines Flight 007, an Ilyushin Il-62, crashed near Warsaw, Poland, after the number two engine disintegrated and severed the elevator and rudder control lines; all 87 on board were killed.
- April 12 – Transbrasil Flight 303, a Boeing 727, crashed into a hill near Florianópolis, Brazil, killing 55 of 58 on board.
- April 25 – Dan-Air Flight 1008, a Boeing 727, crashed into a mountain near Tenerife, Spain, killing all 138 passengers and eight crew on board.
- April 27 – Thai Airways Flight 231, a Hawker Siddeley HS 748, crashed while on approach to Don Mueang International Airport, Bangkok, Thailand, in severe weather, killing 44 of 53 on board.
- June 12 – Air Wisconsin Flight 965, a Swearingen Metro II, crashed after a catastrophic engine failure in poor weather en route to Lincoln Municipal Airport, Nebraska; 13 of the 15 passengers and crew were killed.
- June 27 – Itavia Flight 870, a McDonnell Douglas DC-9, crashed into the Tyrrhenian Sea near Italy, killing all 81 people on board.
- July 8 – Aeroflot Flight 4225, a Tupolev Tu-154, crashed shortly after takeoff from Almaty International Airport, killing all 166 people on board.
- August 7 – A Tupolev Tu-154 operated by TAROM undershot the runway at Nouadhibou Airport. One person died of the 168 on board.
- August 19 – Saudia Flight 163, a Lockheed L-1011 Tristar, made an emergency landing at King Khalid International Airport in Riyadh, Saudi Arabia, after a fire broke out on board; the evacuation of the plane was delayed and all 301 on board died.
- September 12 – In the Florida Commuter Airlines crash, a Douglas DC-3 ditched into the Atlantic Ocean near the Bahamas, killing all 34 on board.
- November 3 – In the Latin Carga Convair CV-880 crash, a Convair CV-880 crashed shortly after taking off from Caracas Airport, Venezuela. All four crew members were killed.
- November 19 – Korean Air Flight 015, a Boeing 747, crashed on landing at Gimpo International Airport; 15 of the 226 passengers and crew on board were killed.
- December 21 – A Transportes Aéreos del Cesar Sud Aviation Caravelle operating the route Bogotá-Barranquilla-Valledupar-Riohacha-Medellín-Bogotá crashed near Riohacha, Colombia. All 70 people on board were killed.
- December 22 – Saudia Flight 162, a Lockheed L-1011 Tristar, suffered an explosive decompression over Qatar, killing two passengers who were blown out of the aircraft; the cause was traced to a fatigue failure of a main landing gear wheel flange.

=== 1981 ===
- February 12 – An Aeroflot Ilyushin Il-14 crashed on Heiss Island, after a flight from Moscow. Two of the 13 people on board were killed.
- February 20 – Aerolíneas Argentinas Flight 342, a Boeing 707-387B, nearly hit the transmitting antenna of the North Tower of the World Trade Center in New York City during its approach to John F. Kennedy International Airport. All 58 occupants survived.
- March 2 – Pakistan International Airlines Flight 326, a Boeing 720, was hijacked by the militant insurgency group Al-Zulfiqar for 13 days. One passenger was killed amongst 144 people on board.
- March 26 – LOT Polish Airlines Flight 691, an Antonov An-24, clipped trees and crashed during the final approach to Słupsk-Redzikowo Airport, killing one of the 51 occupants.
- March 28 – Garuda Indonesian Airways Flight 206, a McDonnell Douglas DC-9, was hijacked by Komando Jihad; the pilot was killed; all others survived.
- May 2 – Aer Lingus Flight 164, a Boeing 737, was hijacked while on approach to London Heathrow Airport. The hijacker demanded to be taken to Iran. The plane landed at Le Touquet – Côte d'Opale Airport. After a nearly 10-hour stand-off, the hijacker was arrested. All 108 people survived.
- May 7 – Austral Líneas Aéreas Flight 901, a BAC One-Eleven, crashed near Aeroparque Jorge Newbery after losing control in a thunderstorm, killing all 31 on board.
- June 14 – Aeroflot Flight 498, an Ilyushin Il-14, crashed into a mountain on the Holy Nose Peninsula in Lake Baikal due to crew error, killing all 48 on board.
- June 26 – Dan-Air Flight 240, a Hawker Siddeley HS 748, crashed near Nailstone, Leicestershire, due to a failure of the baggage door, causing rapid decompression and loss of control; all three crew on board died.
- July 18 – A Soviet Air Defence Forces Sukhoi SU-15 collided with an Argentine Canadair CL-44 operating an international cargo flight between Iran and Cyprus; the SU-15 pilot ejected and survived the incident, but all four occupants of the CL-44 were killed.
- July 20 – Somali Airlines Flight 40, a Fokker F27 Friendship, crashed shortly after takeoff from Mogadishu International Airport. All 50 passengers and crew were killed.
- July 27 – Aeromexico Flight 230, a DC-9, made a hard landing at Chihuahua Airport, broke up and caught fire, killing 32 of the 66 people on board.
- August 13 – In the G-ASWI North Sea ditching, a Bristow Helicopters Westland Wessex suffered an engine failure and ditched in the North Sea, killing all 13 on board.
- August 22 – Far Eastern Air Transport Flight 103, a Boeing 737, disintegrated en route and crashed near Taipei, Taiwan; severe corrosion in the fuselage structure led to explosive decompression and disintegration at high altitude; all 110 on board were killed.
- August 22 – LOT Polish Airlines Flight 762, an Antonov An-24, was hijacked by 3 individuals and diverted to West Berlin where they surrendered. All 43 occupants survived
- August 24 – Aeroflot Flight 811, an Antonov An-24, collided in mid-air with a Soviet Air Force Tupolev Tu-16 over the Zavitinsky District, Russia, killing 31 of 32 on board the An-24 and all six on board the Tu-16.
- August 26 – Aeropesca Colombia Flight 221, a Vickers Viscount, flew into Mount Santa Elena, killing all 50 people on board.
- September 18 – In the 1981 Zheleznogorsk mid-air collision, a Yakovlev Yak-40 collided with a Mil Mi-8 helicopter, both operated by Aeroflot, near Zheleznogorsk-Ilimskiy Airport due to ATC errors, killing all 40 occupants of both aircraft.
- September 22 – Eastern Air Lines Flight 935, a Lockheed L-1011 TriStar, made an emergency landing at John F. Kennedy International Airport, New York, after one engine exploded severing three out of four hydraulic lines; all 201 on board survived.
- September 29 – Indian Airlines Flight 423, a Boeing 737 operating a domestic flight from Delhi to Amritsar in India, was hijacked by Sikh extremists and forced to land in Lahore, Pakistan, where special forces stormed the aircraft; there were no fatalities.
- October 6 – NLM CityHopper Flight 431, a Fokker F28 Fellowship, was destroyed in flight by a tornado near Rotterdam, killing all 17 people on board.
- October 21 – Malév Flight 641, a Tupolev Tu-154B, landed hard at Prague Airport during a failed go-around attempt. All 90 occupants survived.
- November 8 – Aeroméxico Flight 110, a Douglas DC-9, suffered a cabin decompression and crashed near Zihuatanejo while attempting to make an emergency landing at Acapulco International Airport, killing all 18 on board.
- November 17 – Aeroflot Flight 3603, a Tupolev Tu-154, crashed while attempting to land at Norilsk Airport, killing 99 of the 167 passengers and crew.
- December 1 – Inex-Adria Aviopromet Flight 1308, a McDonnell Douglas MD-82, crashed in the mountains while approaching Campo dell'Oro Airport in Ajaccio, Corsica, killing all 180 on board making this the worst crash of the MD-80 series.

=== 1982 ===
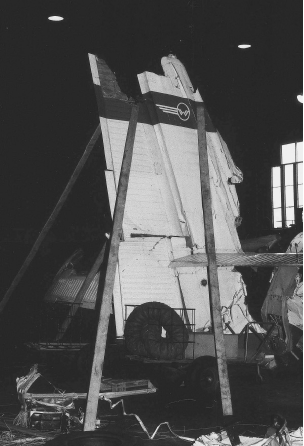
Vertical stabilizer found at the crash site of Widerøe Flight 933

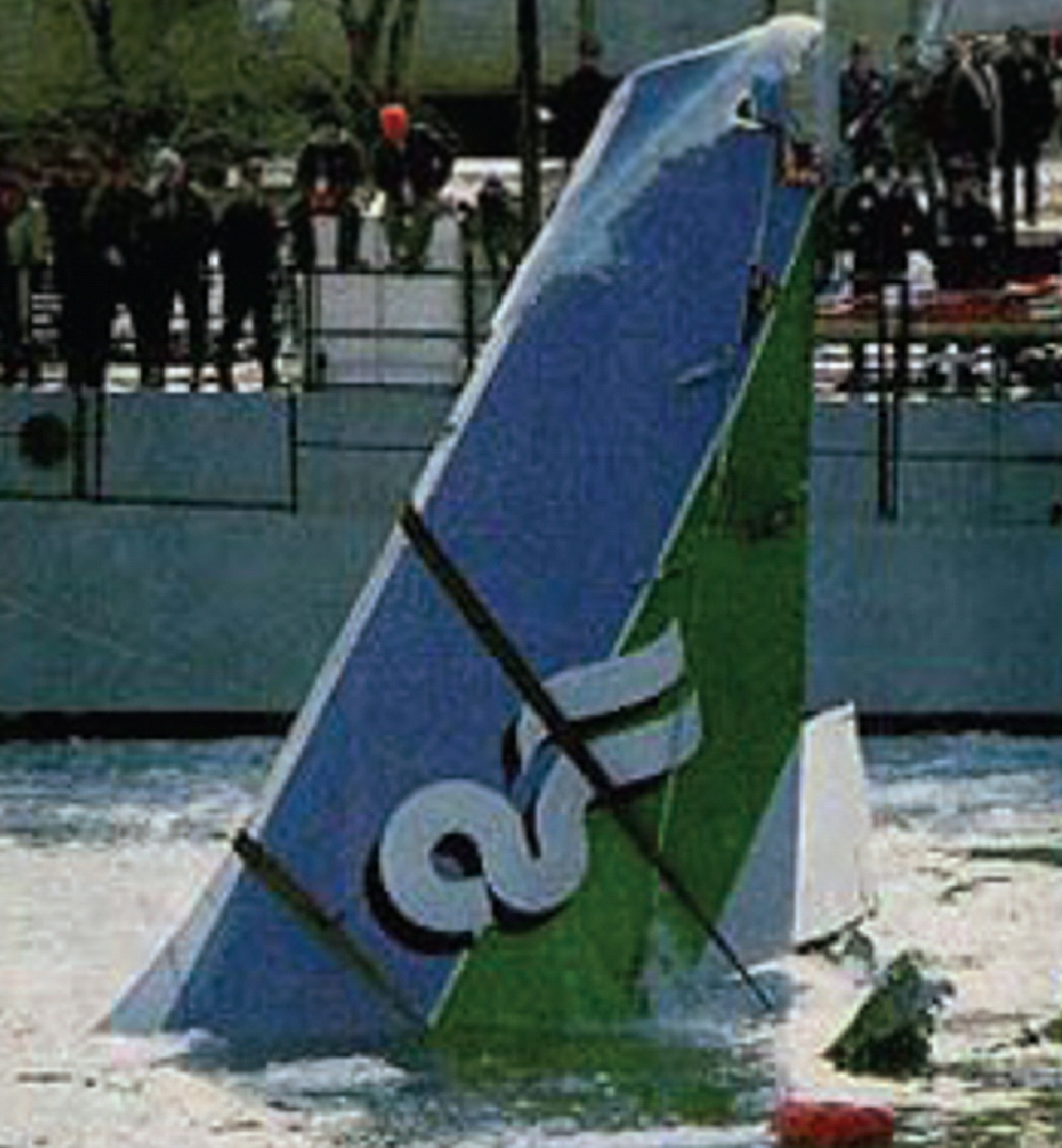
The tail of Flight 90 in the water

- January 13 – Air Florida Flight 90, a Boeing 737, crashed into the frozen Potomac River after takeoff from Washington National Airport, Virginia, United States; five on board survived; 74 on board and four on the ground died, including one initial survivor who died after ensuring that the other crash survivors were rescued from the frozen river.
- January 23 – World Airways Flight 30H, a McDonnell Douglas DC-10, overshot the runway at Boston, Massachusetts, United States; two passengers were reported missing when part of the plane plunged into Boston Harbor and were presumed to have drowned.
- February 9 – Japan Airlines Flight 350, a Douglas DC-8-61, crashed on approach to Tokyo International Airport (Haneda), Japan; of the 166 passengers and eight crew, 24 passengers were killed.
- February 21 – Pilgrim Airlines Flight 458, a de Havilland Canada DHC-6-100, made a forced landing on the frozen Scituate Reservoir near Providence, Rhode Island, after a fire broke out in the cockpit and cabin. One passenger was killed, and eight of the remaining nine passengers, as well as both crew members, were seriously injured.
- March 11 – Widerøe Flight 933, a de Havilland Canada Twin Otter, crashed into the Barents Sea near Gamvik, Norway, killing all 15 on board; this accident sparked conspiracy theories in Norway.
- March 20 – A Garuda Indonesian Airways Fokker F-28 overshot the runway while landing in bad weather at Bandar Lampung, Indonesia; all 27 on board were killed.
- March 26 – Aeropesca Colombia Flight 217, a Vickers Viscount, hit a mountain in Colombia; all 21 on board were killed.
- April 26 – CAAC Flight 3303, a Hawker Siddeley Trident, crashed into a mountain near Yangsuo while on approach to Guilin Liangjiang International Airport, China, in bad weather; all 112 on board died.
- May 25 – VASP Flight 234, a Boeing 737-2A1, suffered a runway excursion, killing two of the 118 occupants.
- June 8 – VASP Flight 168, a Boeing 727, crashed into a hillside in Brazil, killing all 137 on board.
- June 12 – A TABA Fairchild FH-227 crashed at Tabatinga Airport, Brazil; all 44 on board were killed.
- June 21 – Air India Flight 403, a Boeing 707, crashed at Sahar International Airport in Bombay, India, while landing during a heavy rainstorm; 15 of 99 passengers and two of 12 crew were killed.
- June 24 – British Airways Flight 009, a Boeing 747-200, flew through a cloud of volcanic ash south of Java; all engines failed, forcing the plane to glide; the crew were able to restart the engines and make a safe landing.
- June 28 – Aeroflot Flight 8641, a Yakovlev Yak-42, broke up in mid-air and crashed near Mozyr, Belarus, due to a failure in the jackscrew mechanism caused by metal fatigue, killing all 132 on board in the first loss of and the deadliest accident involving the Yak-42. The crash remains the worst in Belarus.
- July 6 – Aeroflot Flight 411, an Ilyushin Il-62, crashed after takeoff from Sheremetyevo International Airport, Russia; all 90 on board were killed.
- July 9 – Pan Am Flight 759, a Boeing 727, crashed in Kenner, Louisiana, United States, shortly after takeoff; all 145 on board and eight people on the ground were killed.
- August 11 – A bomb placed under a seat cushion exploded on board Pan Am Flight 830, a Boeing 747-100 flying from Tokyo, Japan, to Honolulu, Hawaii; one passenger was killed and the plane made an emergency landing in Honolulu.
- August 26 – Southwest Air Lines Flight 611 overshot the runway and caught fire at Ishigaki Airport, Japan, after a flight from Naha. All 138 occupants survived, but 67 were injured.
- September 1 – An Aerolíneas Cóndor de Havilland Canada DHC-4 Caribou flew into high ground in the Andes, Ecuador; all 44 on board were killed.
- September 13 – Spantax Flight 995, a McDonnell Douglas DC-10, was destroyed by a fire after an aborted takeoff at Málaga Airport, Spain; 50 of the 294 on board died.
- September 17 – Japan Air Lines Flight 792, a Douglas DC-8-61, overshot the runway due to broken hydraulics that made the brakes inoperable. All 124 occupants survived.
- September 29 – Aeroflot Flight 343, an Ilyushin Il-62, veered off the runway while landing at Luxembourg Findel Airport, killing seven of 77 on board.
- December 9 – Aeronor Flight 304, a Fairchild F-27, crashed near La Florida Airport, Chile; all 46 on board were killed.
- December 24 – CAAC Flight 2311, an Ilyushin Il-18 which had landed at Baiyun Airport in Guangzhou, China, caught fire on the runway; 25 of the 69 on board died.

=== 1983 ===
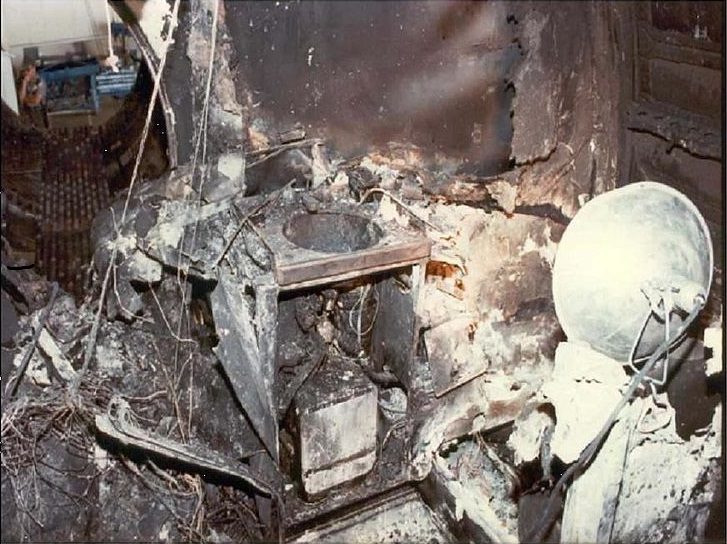
Fire damage in the aft lavatory, the point of origin of the fire on Air Canada Flight 797

- January 11 – United Airlines Flight 2885, a Douglas DC-8-54F, crashed shortly after taking off from Detroit Metropolitan Wayne County Airport, Michigan. All three crew members were killed.
- January 16 – Turkish Airlines Flight 158, a Boeing 727, landed about 50 metres (160 ft) short of the runway at Ankara Esenboğa Airport, Turkey, in driving snow, broke up and caught fire; 47 passengers were killed; all seven crew and 13 passengers were injured.
- March 7 – Balkan Bulgarian Airlines Flight 013, an Antonov An-24, was hijacked by four men with knives. The hijackers were tricked into believing they were going to Vienna, Austria, while the plane was diverting to Varna, Bulgaria. At Varna, the plane was stormed and one hijacker was killed.
- March 11 – Avensa Flight 007, a Douglas DC-9, crashed at Barquisimeto Airport, Venezuela, killing 22 passengers and one crew member.
- April 29 – SAN Ecuador Flight 832, a Sud Caravelle, had two of its engines failed and crashed short of the runway, killing 8 of the 100 on board.
- May 5 – CAAC Flight 296, a Hawker Siddeley Trident 2E, was a scheduled domestic passenger flight in China that was hijacked by six Chinese nationals and forced to land at Camp Page, a US military base in Chuncheon, South Korea. The hijackers were detained by the Korean authorities; all 114 occupants (including the hijackers) survived.
- May 5 – Eastern Air Lines Flight 855, a Lockheed L-1011 Tristar, lost power from all engines 30 minutes after takeoff from Miami International Airport; the pilot was able to return to Miami after restarting one engine; no casualties were reported on board.
- June 2 – On board Air Canada Flight 797, a McDonnell Douglas DC-9, a fire began in a lavatory while the plane was flying over Kentucky; 23 of 46 passengers died after a plume of fire engulfed the cabin, triggered by a flashover caused by the plane's doors opening after successfully landing in Northern Kentucky. The 23 survivors suffered from smoke inhalation and sustained minor injuries.
- June 8 – Reeve Aleutian Airways Flight 8, a Lockheed L-188C Electra en route from Cold Bay, Alaska, to Seattle, Washington, United States, experienced damage to the flight controls after one of the propellers broke away from its engine and struck the fuselage. The pilots were able to make a successful emergency landing.
- July 1 – A Chosonminhang Ilyushin Il-62 crashed in mountainous terrain near Labé, Guinea, killing all 23 on board.
- July 11 – TAME Flight 173, a Boeing 737-200 on a domestic flight in Ecuador, crashed into a mountain, killing all 119 on board.
- July 16 – A British Airways Sikorsky S-61 helicopter crashed into the sea off the Isles of Scilly; 20 of 26 people on board died, in the worst helicopter accident in the United Kingdom to date. The accident resulted in a review of helicopter safety.
- July 23 – Air Canada Flight 143, a Boeing 767, ran out of fuel over Manitoba because of a miscalculation; the crew successfully glided the aircraft to a safe landing at a former Air Force base (and current drag strip) at Gimli, Manitoba; the aircraft became known as the Gimli Glider.
- August 30 – Aeroflot Flight 5463, a Tupolev Tu-134A, crashed into a mountain while approaching Alma-Ata Airport, killing all 90 on board.
- September 1 – Korean Air Lines Flight 007, a Boeing 747, was shot down by Soviet fighter planes near Sakhalin and Moneron Island after straying into Soviet airspace; all 269 people on board were killed.
- September 14 – In the 1983 Guilin Airport collision, a PLAAF Harbin H-5 bomber collided with a CAAC Hawker Siddeley Trident 2E as it taxied for takeoff at Guilin Qifengling Airport, China; 11 of the 106 occupants of the Trident were killed. How many casualties, if any, occurred on board the Harbin H-5 is unknown
- September 23 – Gulf Air Flight 771, a Boeing 737, crashed near Al Buraimi, Oman, after a bomb planted by the Abu Nidal Organization detonated on board; all 112 people on board died.
- October 11 – Air Illinois Flight 710, a Hawker Siddeley HS 748, crashed near Pinckneyville, Illinois, due to electrical problems. All 10 passengers and crew were killed.
- November 8 – TAAG Angola Airlines Flight 462, a Boeing 737-200, crashed shortly after takeoff from Lubango Airport, killing all 130 on board; UNITA guerillas claimed to have shot the aircraft down, while Angolan authorities concluded that the aircraft suffered a mechanical failure.
- November 18 – Aeroflot Flight 6833, a Tupolev Tu-134, was hijacked by seven Georgians attempting to defect from the Soviet Union. The aircraft was stormed by Alpha Group, who arrested four hijackers; three were executed, while the fourth received a jail sentence. Of the 71 on board (including the hijackers), eight died, and the aircraft was written off.
- November 27 – Avianca Flight 011, a Boeing 747, struck a hill because of a navigational error while attempting to land in Madrid, Spain; of the 192 passengers and crew, 11 survived.
- November 28 – Nigeria Airways Flight 250, a Fokker F28 Fellowship, crashed on approach to Enugu airport after a flight from Lagos; 53 of the 72 people on board were killed.
- December 7 – In the Madrid runway disaster, Iberia Flight 350, a Boeing 727, collided with Aviaco Flight 134, a McDonnell Douglas DC-9, on a runway at Madrid–Barajas Airport; 51 people on board the Boeing 727 and all 42 people on board the DC-9 were killed.
- December 14 – A TAMPA Colombia Boeing 707-300 crashed shortly after takeoff from Medellin. All three crew members were killed, as well as 22 people on the ground.
- December 18 – Malaysian Airline System Flight 684, an Airbus A300, crashed at Kuala Lumpur Airport in Malaysia. All 247 people on board survived.
- December 20 – Ozark Air Lines Flight 650, a McDonnell Douglas DC-9, collided with a snow plow in Sioux Falls, South Dakota. All on board survived, but the driver of the snow plow was killed.
- December 23 – In the 1983 Anchorage runway collision, Korean Air Lines Flight 084, a McDonnell Douglas DC-10, collided with SouthCentral Air Flight 59, a Piper PA-31-350, on a runway at Anchorage International Airport, Alaska, United States; all 12 occupants of both aircraft survived.
- December 24 – Aeroflot Flight 601, an Antonov An-24, crashed on approach to Leshukonskoye Airport due to pilot error, killing 44 of 49 on board.

=== 1984 ===
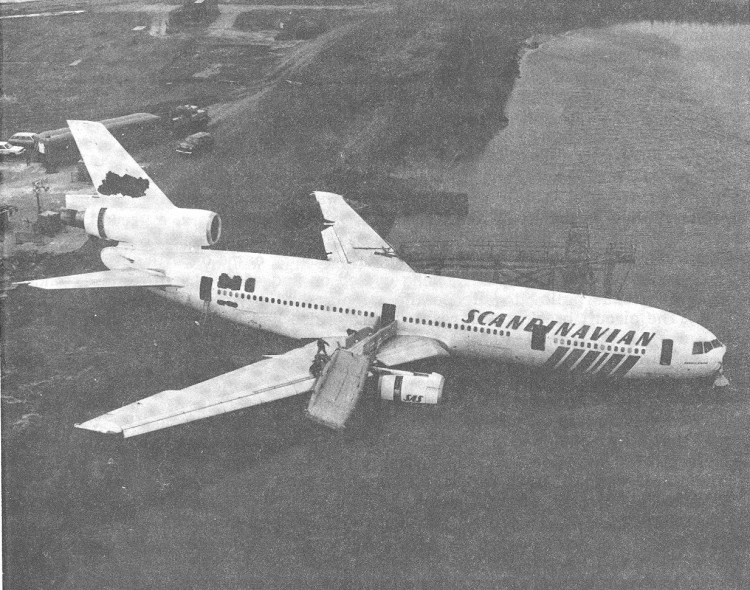
Wreckage of Scandinavian Airlines System Flight 901

- January 10 – A Balkan Bulgarian Tupolev Tu-134 crashed into a forest near Sofia, Bulgaria, during a snowstorm, killing all 50 people on board.
- February 3 – Serviços Aéreos Cruzeiro do Sul Flight 302, an Airbus A300B4-203, was hijacked while flying from Rio de Janeiro to Manaus and then diverted to Cuba. There were no fatalities among the 176 on board.
- February 28 – Scandinavian Airlines System Flight 901, a McDonnell Douglas DC-10, crashed into a ditch after overshooting the runway at John F. Kennedy Airport, New York, due to pilot error; all 177 passengers and crew survived the incident.

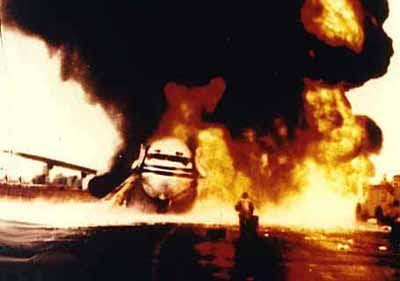
Pacific Western Airlines Flight 501 on fire after the left engine suffered an uncontained engine failure

- March 22 – Pacific Western Airlines Flight 501, a Boeing 737, suffered an uncontained engine failure during takeoff from Calgary, Canada; all passengers and crew were safely evacuated, but the plane was destroyed by fire.
- June 28 – In the 1984 Transportes Aéreos Regionais Bandeirante accident, an Embraer EMB-110 Bandeirante crashed near São Pedro de Aldeia in Brazil, killing all 18 people on board.
- July 5 – Nine Sikhs belonging to the Khalistan movement forced Indian Airlines Flight 405, an Airbus A300 on a domestic flight from Srinagar to Delhi with 254 passengers and 10 crew on board, to fly to Lahore Airport in Pakistan. The demands of the hijackers were not met and they ultimately surrendered to Pakistani authorities on July 6.
- July 29 – Aeropostal Flight 252, a McDonnell Douglas DC-9-51, was hijacked by two. The hijackers were shot dead, rescuing the 87 hostages.
- August 2 – Vieques Air Link Flight 901A, a BN-2 Islander flying from Puerto Rico to the US Virgin Islands, crashed into the Caribbean Sea, killing all nine on board.
- August 5 – Biman Bangladesh Airlines Flight 426, a Fokker F27, crashed into a marsh near Zia International Airport in Dhaka, Bangladesh, while landing in poor weather. With a total death toll of 49 people, it is the deadliest aviation disaster to occur on Bangladeshi soil.
- August 24 – Seven Sikh hijackers forced Indian Airlines Flight 421, a Boeing 737 flying from Delhi to Srinagar, to fly to the United Arab Emirates, where that country's defence minister negotiated the release of the passengers. The incident was related to the Sikh secessionist struggle in the Indian state of Punjab.
- August 24 – Wing West Airlines Flight 628, a Beechcraft C-99, collided with a descending Rockwell Commander 112 during takeoff, killing all 17 on both aircraft.
- August 30 – Cameroon Airlines Flight 786, a Boeing 737 with 109 passengers and seven crew on board, suffered an uncontained engine failure while taxiing prior to takeoff at Douala International Airport, Cameroon; all on board were able to evacuate the aircraft but two people died in the fire that had started outside, and the plane was destroyed.
- September 18 – Aeroservicios Ecuatorianos Flight 767-103, a Douglas DC-8-55F, crashed after failing to get airborne at Mariscal Sucre International Airport, Quito, Ecuador. All four crew, as well as 49 on the ground, were killed.
- October 11 – Aeroflot Flight 3352, a Tupolev Tu-154B, crashed on landing at Tsentralny Airport, Omsk, Russia, killing 174 passengers and four people on the ground.
- October 19 – Wapiti Aviation Flight 402, a Piper PA-31 en route from Edmonton to Peace River, Canada, crashed on approach to its stopover in High Prairie. Six of the ten people on board were killed.
- December 3 – Kuwait Airways Flight 221, an Airbus A310, was hijacked by four armed Lebanese Shia militants. The plane diverted to Mashhad, Iran, and the hostages were released there. Two of the 161 occupants were killed; those who died were American and employees of USAID. The incident raised suspicions of Iranian involvement in the hijacking, and also intensified the Iran-Iraq War.
- December 6 – Provincetown-Boston Airlines Flight 1039, an Embraer 110 Bandeirante with 13 passengers and crew on board, crashed upon takeoff at Jacksonville, Florida, killing all on board.
- December 23 – Aeroflot Flight 3519, a Tupolev Tu-154B, crashed at Krasnoyarsk Airport while attempting an emergency landing following an engine fire, killing 110 of 111 on board.

=== 1985 ===
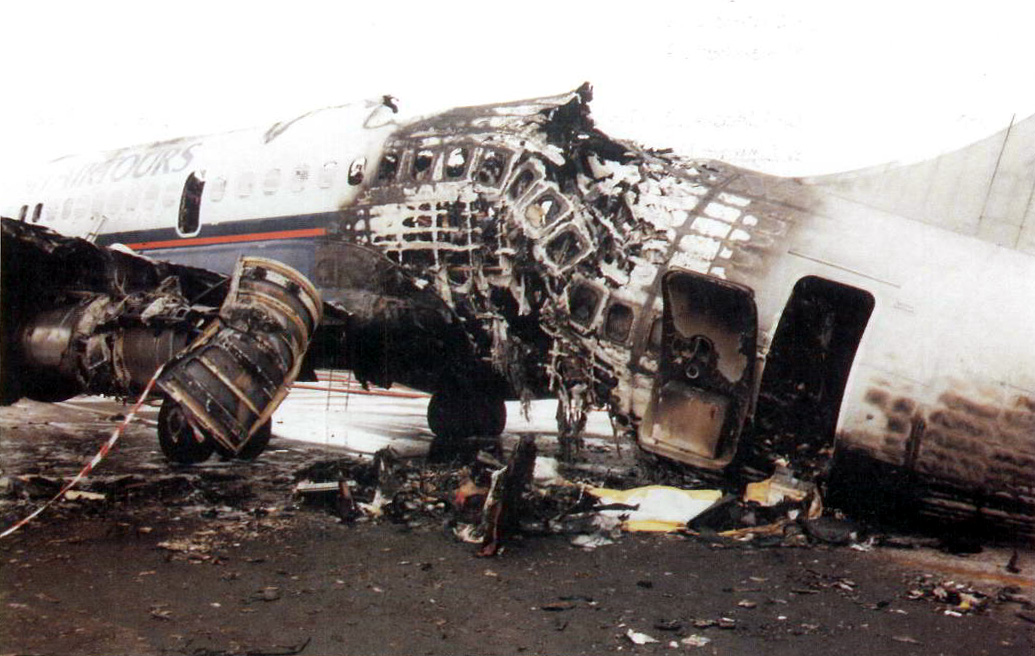
Remains of British Airtours Flight 28M at Manchester Airport

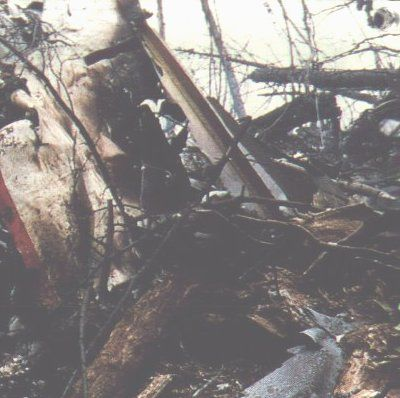
Wreckage of Japan Air Lines Flight 123 in Mount Takamagahara

- January 1 – Eastern Air Lines Flight 980, a Boeing 727 en route from Paraguay to Florida, United States, hit Mount Illimani in Bolivia while descending for a scheduled stopover at El Alto International Airport, killing all 29 people on board.
- January 18 – CAAC Flight 5109, an Antonov An-24B, crashed near Jinan while flying from Shanghai to Beijing; 38 of the 41 people on board were killed.
- January 19 — A Cubana de Aviacion Il-18 lost control immediately after takeoff and crashed, killing all 38 on board.
- January 21 – Galaxy Airlines Flight 203, a Lockheed L-188 Electra bound for Minneapolis, Minnesota, United States, crashed shortly after takeoff from Cannon International Airport in Reno, Nevada, due to an air start access door being improperly secured; 70 of the 71 people on board were killed.
- January 23 – AIRES Flight 585, an Embraer EMB 110 Bandeirante, crashed into a mountainside while on approach, killing all 17 occupants.
- February 1 – Aeroflot Flight 7841, a Tupolev Tu-134 operating a domestic flight in the Soviet Union, crashed 6.2 miles (10.0 km) east of Minsk National Airport after both engines failed due to ice ingestion, killing 58 of the 80 on board.
- February 19 – China Airlines Flight 006, a Boeing 747SP en route from Taoyuan International Airport, Taiwan, to Los Angeles in the United States, suffered an engine flameout off the coast of California and dived 30,000 feet (9,100 m) before regaining control; the aircraft landed safely in San Francisco and all 274 occupants survived, with 24 passengers injured.
- February 19 – Iberia Flight 610, a Boeing 727 operating a domestic flight in Spain, crashed into a television broadcast antenna installed on the summit of Monte Oiz while approaching Bilbao Airport, killing all 141 passengers and seven crew.
- February 22 – An Air Mali Antonov An-24 crashed on takeoff from Timbuktu airport after suffering an engine failure; 51 of the 52 people on board were killed.
- May 3 – Aeroflot Flight 8381, a Tupolev Tu-134 operating a domestic flight in the Soviet Union, collided with a Soviet Air Force Antonov An-26; both aircraft crashed near Zolochev, Ukraine, killing all 94 people on board the two aircraft.
- June 14 – Trans World Airlines Flight 847, a Boeing 727 operating a multi-leg flight from Cairo, Egypt, to San Diego, California, United States, was hijacked by Lebanese militants shortly after taking off from Athens in Greece; one passenger was murdered during the three-day ordeal.
- June 21 – Braathens SAFE Flight 139, a Boeing 737 operating a domestic flight in Norway, was hijacked by a political activist who demanded to speak to the Norwegian Prime Minister Kåre Willoch; all crew and passengers survived unharmed.
- June 23 – Air India Flight 182, a Boeing 747 en route from Montréal–Mirabel International Airport to London Heathrow Airport, was destroyed over the Atlantic Ocean off the southwest coast of Ireland by a bomb planted by Sikh extremists; all 329 people on board died.
- July 10 – Aeroflot Flight 7425, a Tupolev Tu-154B operating a domestic flight in the Soviet Union, stalled while cruising at 38,000 feet (11,582 m) over Uzbekistan and entered an unrecoverable spin, killing all 200 people on board.
- August 2 – Delta Air Lines Flight 191, a Lockheed L-1011 TriStar flying from Florida to California in the United States, crashed on approach to Dallas/Fort Worth International Airport after experiencing wind shear from a sudden microburst thunderstorm; 136 of the 163 people on board were killed, as well as a motorist whose car was struck by the aircraft.
- August 12 – Japan Air Lines Flight 123, a Boeing 747 operating a domestic flight in Japan, crashed into Mount Takamagahara after suffering a rapid decompression that severed all hydraulic lines and rendered the aircraft uncontrollable; with the loss of 520 of the 524 people on board, this is the deadliest single-aircraft disaster in history to date.
- August 22 – British Airtours Flight 28M, a Boeing 737 bound for Corfu International Airport, Greece, aborted its takeoff from Manchester Airport, England, because of an engine fire; 55 of the 137 on board were killed, mostly due to smoke inhalation.
- August 25 – Bar Harbor Airlines Flight 1808, a Beech 99 operating a domestic multi-leg flight from Boston, Massachusetts, to Bangor, Maine, United States, crashed on approach to Auburn/Lewiston Municipal Airport, where it was about to make an unscheduled flag stop; all six passengers, including "Goodwill Ambassador" Samantha Smith, and two crew died.
- September 4 – A Bakhtar Afghan Airlines Antonov An-26 was shot down over Afghanistan by a ground-to-air missile, while operating a domestic flight from Kandahar to Farah; all 52 people on board were killed.
- September 6 – Midwest Express Airlines Flight 105, a McDonnell Douglas DC-9 bound for Atlanta, Georgia, crashed shortly after takeoff from Milwaukee Mitchell International Airport, Wisconsin, due to engine failure and pilot error, killing all 31 people on board.
- September 23 – Henson Airlines Flight 1517, a Beechcraft Model 99 operating a domestic flight from Maryland to Virginia in the United States, crashed on approach to Shenandoah Valley Regional Airport, killing all 14 passengers and crew.
- November 23 – EgyptAir Flight 648, a Boeing 737 operating a flight between Greece and Egypt, was hijacked by Palestinian militants and forced to land on the island of Malta, where Egyptian Special Forces stormed the aircraft; the incident resulted in the deaths of 56 of the 89 passengers, two of the six crew members, and all but one of the hijackers.
- November 25 – An Aeroflot Antonov An-12 was shot down over Angola. All 23 people on board were killed.
- December 12 – Arrow Air Flight 1285, a Douglas DC-8 operating a multi-leg charter flight from Cairo, Egypt, to Kentucky in the United States, crashed shortly after takeoff from Gander International Airport, Newfoundland, killing all 256 passengers and crew, making it the worst air disaster to occur on Canadian soil to date.
- December 19 – Aeroflot Flight 101/435, an Antonov An-24 operating a multi-leg domestic flight in the Soviet Union, was hijacked by the co-pilot and diverted to China; the aircraft landed safely at Qiqihar Airport in northeast China and all 51 on board were unharmed.

=== 1986 ===
- January 18 – In the 1986 Aerovías Guatemala air crash, a Sud Aviation SE-210 Caravelle crashed into a hill on approach into Santa Elena Airport, Guatemala. All 93 passengers and crew were killed.
- January 28 – VASP Flight 210 ran off the end of the taxiway from which it had mistakenly tried to take off in São Paulo, Brazil, then collided with an embankment, killing one passenger.
- February 16 – China Airlines Flight 2265 crashed into the Pacific Ocean during a go-around after touching the ground at Penghu Airport, killing all 13 on board. The wreckage was found on March 10.
- March 31 – Mexicana de Aviación Flight 940, a Boeing 727, crashed into high ground near Santiago Maravatío, Mexico. All 167 passengers and crew were killed in the worst ever air disaster involving the Boeing 727.
- April 2 – TWA Flight 840, a Boeing 727, was bombed by Palestinian militants, killing four of the 121 people on board; the plane managed to land safely in Athens.
- May 3 – Air Lanka Flight 512, a Lockheed L-1011, was bombed by the Liberation Tigers of Tamil Eelam, killing 21 of 148 on board.
- May 3 – China Airlines Flight 334, a Boeing 747, was hijacked by the pilot, who subdued the two other crew members and changed heading to land in Guangzhou. All three on board survived.
- June 18 – Grand Canyon Airlines Flight 6, a de Havilland Canada DHC-6 Twin Otter, collided with a Bell 206 helicopter over the Tonto Plateau, killing all 25 on board both aircraft.
- July 2 – Aeroflot Flight 2306, a Tupolev Tu-134, crashed near Syktyvkar, Russia, while attempting an emergency landing following a fire in the cargo hold, killing 54 of 92 on board.
- August 3 – LIAT Flight 319, a DHC-6 Twin Otter, crashed into the sea en route to E. T. Joshua Airport, St. Vincent and the Grenadines. All 13 passengers and crew were killed.
- August 16 – A Sudan Airways Fokker F-27 was shot down by SPLA militia while flying from Malakal to Khartoum. All 60 people on board were killed.
- August 31 – Aeroméxico Flight 498, a McDonnell Douglas DC-9, collided with a Piper Cherokee over Cerritos, California, killing all 67 people on board both aircraft and 15 people on the ground.
- September 5 – Pan Am Flight 73, a Boeing 747, was hijacked on the ground at Jinnah International Airport in Karachi, Pakistan, by Palestinian militants. Twenty people died in a shootout inside the plane.
- September 20 – Aeroflot Flight 36075, a Tupolev Tu-134, was hijacked by two deserting Internal Troops soldiers (initially three) at the Ufa International Airport. Three out of 83 occupants (including the hijackers) were killed; two of them were shot dead immediately at the beginning of the hijacking, and a hijacker died in the ensuing shootout.
- October 5 – A Corporate Air Services Fairchild C-123 was shot down over Nicaragua while operating a cargo flight. Three of the four people on board were killed.
- October 20 – Aeroflot Flight 6502, a Tupolev Tu-134, crashed in Kuybyshev (now Samara), Russia, due to pilot error, killing 70 of 94 people on board.
- October 26 – A grenade exploded on board Thai Airways International Flight 620, an Airbus A300B4-601 flying from Bangkok to Osaka. No one died, but 109 of the 247 occupants were injured. The plane landed safely at Osaka and was later repaired.
- November 6 – In the 1986 British International Helicopters Chinook crash, a Boeing 234LR Chinook crashed on approach to Sumburgh Airport, Shetland Islands; of 47 people on board, 45 died.
- November 17 – Japan Air Lines Cargo Flight 1628 incident, a Boeing 747-200F cargo plane flying from Paris to Narita was involved in a UFO incident. No casualties were reported. The plane landed safely at Narita International Airport.
- December 12 – Aeroflot Flight 892, a Tupolev Tu-134A, crashed near Schonefeld Airport, East Berlin, after the crew misunderstood instructions from ATC, killing 72 of 82 on board; two initially survived but died later.
- December 25 – Iraqi Airways Flight 163, a Boeing 737, was hijacked by Hezbollah militants while en route to Amman, Jordan. A confrontation with security forces caused the plane to crash, killing 63 of the 106 people on board.

=== 1987 ===
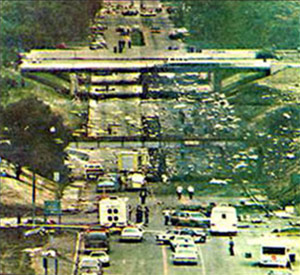
Debris from Northwest Airlines Flight 255 scattered across Middlebelt Road after it crashed on August 16, 1987

- January 3 – Varig Flight 797, a Boeing 707, crashed near Abidjan, Ivory Coast, because of engine failure. Of the 52 passengers and crew, only one survived.
- January 15 – Skywest Airlines Flight 1834, a Swearingen Metro II, collided in mid-air with a private Mooney M-20 near Salt Lake City, killing all 10 on board both aircraft.
- January 16 – Aeroflot Flight U-505, a Yakovlev Yak-40, crashed at Tashkent, Uzbekistan, after encountering a wake vortex from an Ilyushin Il-76 that had taken off one and a half minutes earlier, killing all nine on board.
- March 4 – Northwest Airlink Flight 2268, a CASA 212, crashed while attempting to land at Detroit Metropolitan Wayne County Airport in Detroit, Michigan, killing nine of the 19 passengers and crew.
- April 4 – Garuda Indonesia Flight 035, a McDonnell Douglas DC-9, crashed in bad weather during its approach to Medan, Indonesia; 23 of 45 on board died.
- April 13 – Buffalo Airways Flight 721, a cargo Boeing 707 flying from Oklahoma City to Fort Wayne, crashed on approach to its stopover in Kansas City. All four people on board were killed.
- May 8 – American Eagle Flight 5452, a CASA C-212, crashed while landing at Mayagüez, Puerto Rico, due to maintenance issues and pilot error. All four passengers survived, but both crew were killed.
- May 9 – LOT Polish Airlines Flight 5055, an Ilyushin Il-62M, crashed near Warsaw during landing because of engine failure. All 183 passengers and crew members died in the worst aviation accident in Polish history.
- May 19 – Air New Zealand Flight 24, a Boeing 747-200, was hijacked on the tarmac at Nadi International Airport, Fiji, while making a scheduled refuelling stop. The hijacker boarded the aircraft and demanded the release of deposed Fijian prime minister Dr. Timoci Bavadra and his 27 ministers who were being held under house arrest. The flight crew eventually overpowered the hijacker and handed him over to local police. There were no deaths or injuries reported.
- June 19 – Aeroflot Flight N-528, a Yakovlev Yak-40, overshot the runway on landing at Berdyansk, Ukraine, killing eight of 29 on board.
- June 21 – A Burma Airways Fokker F27 crashed near Hopong, Myanmar, while en route from Heho to Monghsat. All 45 people on board were killed.
- June 26 – Philippine Airlines Flight 206, a Hawker Siddeley HS 748, crashed on the slopes of Mount Ugo, Benguet, as it began its approach to Loakan Airport in Baguio City; all 50 passengers and crew were killed. Poor visibility was blamed for the crash.
- July 24 – Air Afrique Flight 056, a McDonnell Douglas DC-10-30, was hijacked and diverted to Geneva Airport, Switzerland, by a member of the Popular Front for the Liberation of Palestine. The hijacker killed one passenger and injured a flight attendant before being apprehended; 29 people were injured during the evacuation.
- July 30 – In the 1987 Belize Air International C-97 Mexico City crash, a Boeing C-97G Stratofreighter crashed on to a highway shortly after taking off from Mexico City International Airport, Mexico. Five of the twelve passengers and crew were killed, as well as 44 on the ground.
- August 16 – Northwest Airlines Flight 255, a McDonnell Douglas MD-82, crashed on takeoff from Detroit as a result of pilot error. Of 155 people on board, four-year-old Cecelia Cichan was the only survivor. Two people in a car on the ground were also killed.
- August 31 – Thai Airways Flight 365, a Boeing 737, crashed into the ocean off the coast of Thailand as a result of pilot error. All 83 passengers and crew died.
- October 11 – A Burma Airways Fokker F27 crashed on a hill near Pagan, Myanmar. All 49 people on board were killed.
- October 15 – Aero Trasporti Italiani Flight 460, an ATR 42-312, crashed into a mountain 15 minutes after takeoff due to pilot error. All 37 on board died.
- November 15 – Continental Airlines Flight 1713, a McDonnell Douglas DC-9, crashed on takeoff during a snowstorm at Denver's Stapleton International Airport, killing 25 passengers and three crew.
- November 23 – Ryan Air Service Flight 103, a Beechcraft 1900C, crashed on landing at Homer Airport, Alaska, after a flight from Kodiak, due to improper loading; 18 of the 21 people on board were killed.
- November 28 – South African Airways Flight 295, a Boeing 747, crashed into the Indian Ocean after a fire in the cargo hold. All 159 on board died.
- November 29 – Korean Air Flight 858, a Boeing 707, crashed into the Andaman Sea after a bomb exploded on board. All 115 people on board were killed.
- December 7 – Pacific Southwest Airlines Flight 1771, a BAe 146, was hijacked and deliberately crashed near Cayucos, California, by a disgruntled airline employee. All 43 people on board, including the hijacker, were killed.
- December 8 – In the 1987 Alianza Lima plane crash, a chartered Peruvian Navy Fokker F-27 crashed into the Pacific Ocean 7 miles (11 km) from Jorge Chávez International Airport, whilst carrying the Peruvian football team Alianza Lima. Of the 44 people on board, only the pilot survived.
- December 13 – Philippine Airlines Flight 443, a Shorts 360–300, crashed into Mt. Gurain on the island of Mindanao. All 15 passengers and crew were killed.
- December 21 – Air Littoral Flight 1919, an Embraer EMB-120, struck trees during approach to Bordeaux–Mérignac Airport. All 16 passengers and crew were killed.
- December 23 – Finnair Flight 915, a McDonnell Douglas DC-10, was the target of an attempted missile attack by the Soviet Union. The allegations came out in 2014 when Finnish media reported a claim by two of the flight's pilots that the missile exploded less than 30 seconds before impact. It caused outrage in Finland among those politicians and civil servants to whom it should have been reported at the time.

=== 1988 ===
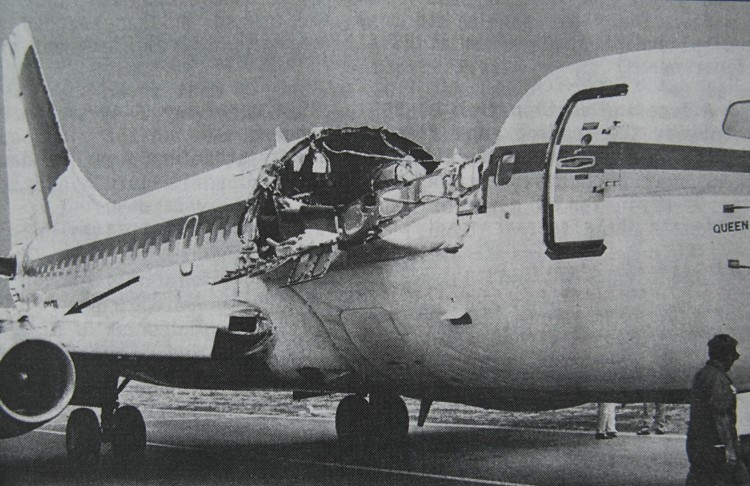
The fuselage of Aloha Airlines Flight 243

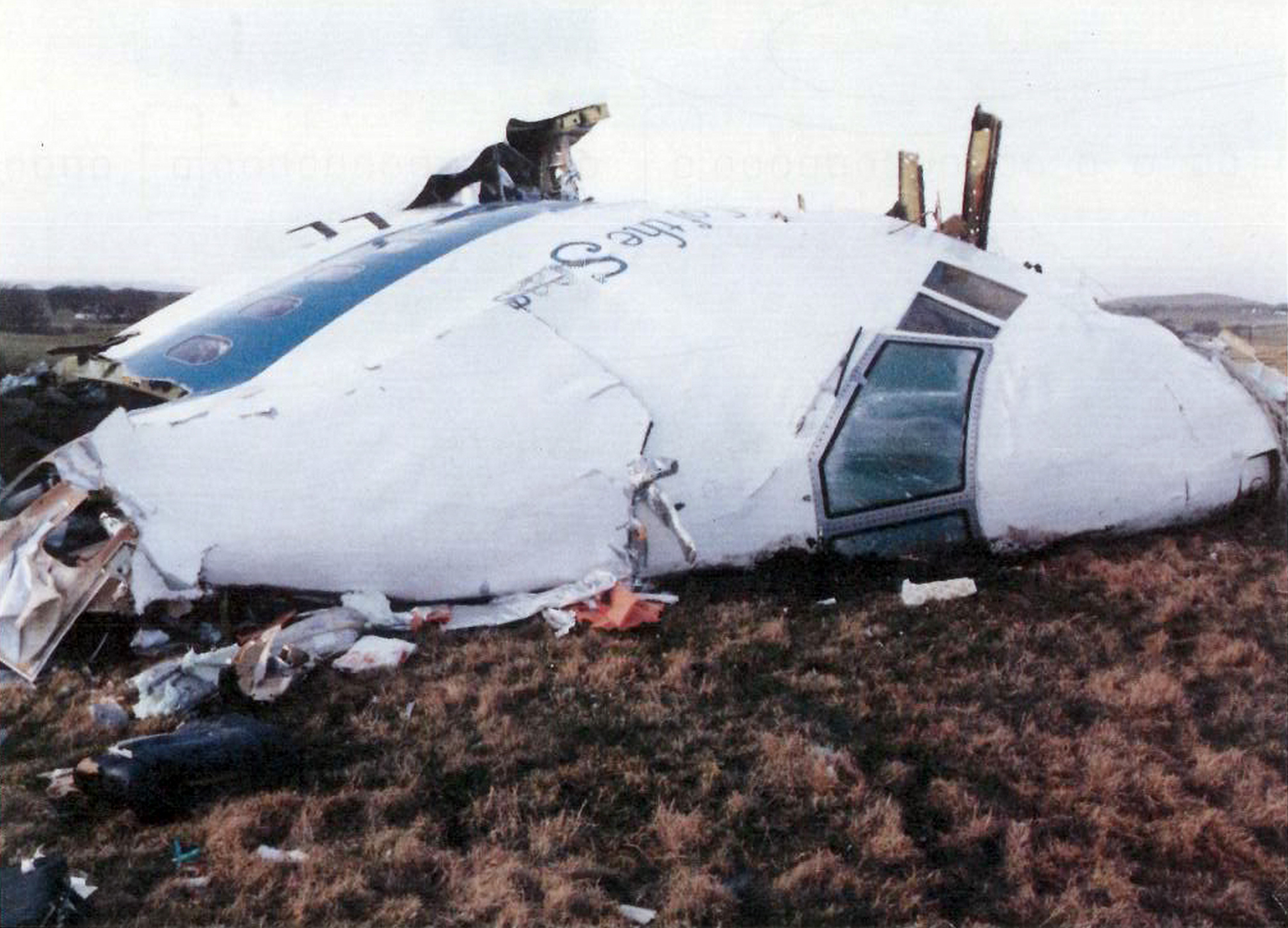
The remains of the nose section of Pan Am Flight 103

- January 2 – Condor Flugdienst Flight 3782, a Boeing 737, crashed into a mountain near Seferihisar, Turkey, due to a navigation error, killing all 16 on board.
- January 18 – China Southwest Airlines Flight 4146, an Ilyushin Il-18, crashed while on approach to Chongqing Airport in China due to loss of control following an in-flight fire; all 108 on board died.
- January 18 – Aeroflot Flight 699, a Tupolev Tu-154, landed hard and crashed at Turkmenbashi International Airport due to pilot error, killing 11 of 146 on board.
- January 19 – Trans-Colorado Airlines Flight 2286, a Swearingen SA227AC Metro III, crashed while on approach to Durango-La Plata Airport. Nine of the 17 passengers and crew were killed.
- January 24 – Aeroflot Flight 29674, an Aeroflot Yak-40, crashed due to engine problems after takeoff from Nizhnevartosk Airport, killing 27 of the 31 on board.
- February 3 – American Airlines Flight 132, a McDonnell Douglas MD-83, suffered an inflight fire due to improperly stored hazardous material in the cargo hold. The plane was headed from Dallas Fort Airport to Nashville International Airport. Of the 126 people on board, no one was killed, but 18 people were injured.
- February 8 – Nürnberger Flugdienst Flight 108, a Swearingen Metroliner III, crashed while en route to Düsseldorf Airport, Germany. The crew become disorientated after the aircraft was struck by lightning, leading to an uncontrollable spin. The aircraft disintegrated in mid-air, resulting in the deaths of all 21 passengers and crew.
- February 19 – AVAir Flight 3378, a Swearingen Metroliner III, crashed on takeoff from Raleigh-Durham Airport due to pilot error, killing all 12 on board.
- February 27 – Aeroflot Flight 7867, a Tupolev Tu-134, crashed while on approach to Surgut Airport, killing 20 of the 51 occupants onboard.
- February 27 – A Boeing 727-200 operated by Talia Airways crashed in the Kyrenian mountains, in northern Cyprus, killing all 15 people on board.
- March 1 – Comair Flight 206, an Embraer EMB-110 Bandeirante, crashed near Germiston in South Africa after a bomb exploded on board. All 17 people on board were killed.
- March 4 – TAT Flight 230, a Fairchild FH-227, crashed near Fontainebleau, France, killing all 23 on board; an electrical problem was suspected.
- March 8 – Aeroflot Flight 3739, a Tupolev Tu-154B, was hijacked by 11 members of the Ovechkin family attempting to escape the Soviet Union. The pilots diverted to a Soviet air base at Veshchevo, where the aircraft was stormed. Out of 84 people on board, eight people (five hijackers and three passengers) died during the storming, and a flight attendant was killed during the landing, bringing the total death toll to nine.
- March 17 – Avianca Flight 410, a Boeing 727, crashed near Cúcuta, Colombia, after takeoff, as a result of pilot error. All 143 people on board died.
- April 5 – Kuwait Airways Flight 422, a Boeing 747 en route from Bangkok to Kuwait, was hijacked by Lebanese guerillas demanding the release of Shi'ite prisoners held by Kuwait, leading to a hostage crisis lasting 16 days and encompassing three continents. The flight, initially forced to land at Mashhad in northeastern Iran, flew 3,200 miles to Larnaca, Cyprus, and finally to Algiers. Two passengers were shot dead by the hijackers. The remainder of the 112 passengers and crew, including three members of the Kuwaiti royal family, were eventually released and the hijackers allowed to leave Algeria.
- April 15 – Horizon Air Flight 2658, a de Havilland Canada DHC-8-102, suffered an engine fire shortly after takeoff from Seattle. The aircraft landed back on the runway but veered off the side of it and collided with several jetways. None of the 40 occupants were killed.
- April 28 – Aloha Airlines Flight 243, a Boeing 737 en route from Hilo to Honolulu in Hawaii, suffered explosive decompression during flight but managed to land safely. Of 95 people on board, one flight attendant was blown out of the plane and killed, and several passengers were injured.
- May 6 – Widerøe Flight 710, a Dash 7, crashed in Torghatten, Norway, in thick fog, killing all 36 passengers in the worst-ever Dash 7 accident.
- May 23 – LACSA Flight 628, a Boeing 727-22, aborted takeoff and overran the runway, collided with a fence, crossed a ditch, struck a hill and caught fire at Juan Santamaría International Airport in San José, Costa Rica. There were no fatalities.
- May 24 – TACA Flight 110, a Boeing 737, suffered dual engine failure due to water ingestion; the aircraft landed safely at NASA's Michoud Assembly Facility in New Orleans; all on board survived.
- June 12 – Austral Líneas Aéreas Flight 46, a McDonnell Douglas DC-9-81,(More commonly known as the MD-80) crashed short of the runway at Libertador General Jose de San Martin Airport, Argentina, killing all 22 on board.
- June 26 – Air France Flight 296, an Airbus A320, made a low pass over Mulhouse-Habsheim Airport in landing configuration during an air show and crashed into trees at the end of the runway. Of 130 passengers on board, three died.
- July 3 – Iran Air Flight 655, an Airbus A300, was shot down over Iranian waters by the missile cruiser USS Vincennes; all 290 people on board were killed.
- July 13 – The 1988 British International Helicopters Sikorsky S-61N crash: a Sikorsky S-61 ditched in the North Sea due to an engine fire; all 21 on board survived.
- August 31 – CAAC Flight 301, a Hawker Siddeley Trident operating a flight from Guangzhou Baiyun Airport to Hong Kong Kai Tak Airport, ran off the runway. Seven of the 89 passengers and crew were killed.
- August 31 – Delta Air Lines Flight 1141, a Boeing 727, crashed on takeoff from Dallas-Fort Worth International Airport as a result of pilot error and the poor design of Boeing's mechanical failsafe system; of 108 people on board, 12 passengers and two crew members were killed.
- September 9 – Vietnam Airlines Flight 831, a Tupolev Tu-134, crashed on approach to Don Mueang International Airport in Bangkok; 76 of the 90 passengers and crew were killed.
- September 15 – Ethiopian Airlines Flight 604, a Boeing 737, crashed on takeoff after suffering multiple bird strikes; 35 of 98 passengers died but all six crew survived.
- September 26 – Aerolíneas Argentinas Flight 648, a Boeing 737-287, veered off the runway due to crosswind condition and crashed into the Beagle Channel, injuring 13 of the 62 on board, but no one died.
- September 29 – A man hijacked VASP Flight 375 and demanded to go to Brasilia and to then crash the plane into Planalto Palace. The aircraft landed safely in Goiana, and the only fatality was the first officer.
- October 7 – Shanxi Airlines Flight 4218, an Ilyushin Il-14P on a sightseeing flight, crashed into a restaurant due to mechanical failure and passenger overloading, killing 44 of the 48 occupants, plus two people on the ground.
- October 17 – Uganda Airlines Flight 775, a Boeing 707-338C, crashed while attempting to land at Rome's Fiumicino Airport; 33 of the 52 passengers and crew were killed.
- October 19 – Indian Airlines Flight 113, a Boeing 737, crashed 2.6 km short of the runway in Ahmedabad, India, due to poor visibility, killing 133 of the 135 people on board.
- October 25 – Aeroperú Flight 772, a Fokker F28 Fellowship, crashed after taking off from Inca Manco Cápac International Airport, due to an improper flap configuration, killing 12 of the 69 people on board.
- November 2 – LOT Polish Airlines Flight 703, an Antonov An-24, crashed on approach to Rzeszów-Jasionka Airport, killing one passenger.
- December 21 – Pan Am Flight 103, a Boeing 747, disintegrated in the air over Lockerbie, Dumfries and Galloway, Scotland, after a terrorist bomb exploded on board. All 259 people on board and 11 on the ground were killed. The incident is also known as the Lockerbie air disaster.

=== 1989 ===
- January 8 – British Midland Airways Flight 092, a Boeing 737, crashed near Kegworth, Leicestershire, United Kingdom, after one of its engines lost a fan blade and failed. Of the 118 passengers and eight crew, 79 survived. The incident became known as the Kegworth air disaster and was the first loss of a Boeing 737-400.
- February 8 – Independent Air Flight 1851, a Boeing 707, crashed into a hill on approach to Santa Maria, the Azores. All 144 people on board were killed.
- February 19 – Flying Tiger Line Flight 066, a Boeing 747, crashed near Kuala Lumpur, Malaysia, on approach to land, killing all four on board. The crash was caused by miscommunication between ATC and the crew.

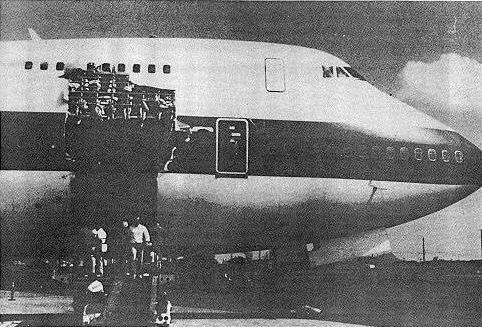
Damage to United Airlines Flight 811 after the cargo door blew open mid-flight; nine passengers were ejected through the hole.

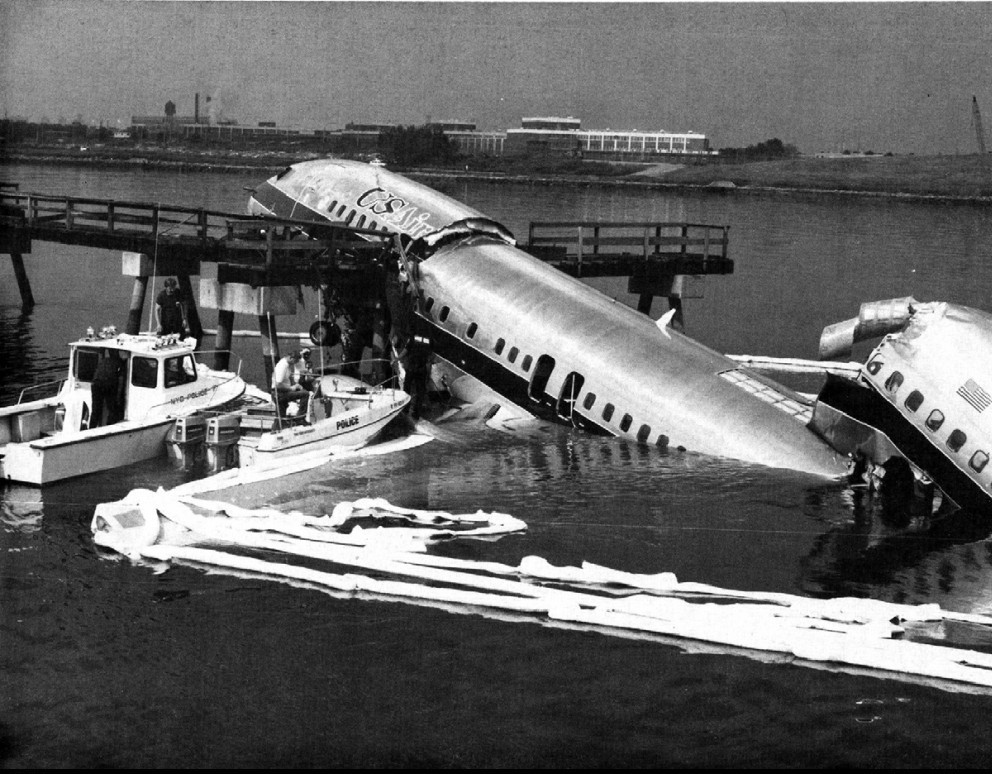
Recovery of USAir Flight 5050 from Bowery Bay.

- February 24 – United Airlines Flight 811, a Boeing 747, suffered an explosive decompression shortly after takeoff from Honolulu, Hawaii, United States, caused by a cargo door that burst open during flight. Of 355 people on board, nine passengers were blown out of the plane, but the crew managed to land safely at Honolulu.
- March 10 – Air Ontario Flight 1363, a Fokker F28, crashed immediately after takeoff from Dryden, Ontario, Canada, because of ice on the wings, killing 24 of 69 people on board.
- March 18 – Evergreen International Airlines Flight 17, a McDonnell Douglas DC-9, crashed in Saginaw, Texas, killing both pilots, while attempting to return to Carswell Air Force Base after the main cargo door burst open immediately after takeoff.
- March 21 – Transbrasil Flight 801, a Boeing 707, crashed in a residential area after the flight crew lost control during an expedited approach to São Paulo Guarulhos International Airport. All three crew members and 22 people on the ground were killed.
- May 8 – Holmström Flyg Flight 314, a Beechcraft C99, lost control and dived into the ground as they were descending to Oskarshamn Airport, killing all 16 on board.
- June 7 – Surinam Airways Flight 764, a Douglas DC-8, crashed while attempting to land in heavy fog at Paramaribo, Suriname. The plane hit trees and flipped upside down, killing 176 of 187 people on board.
- June 17 – Interflug Flight 102, an Ilyushin Il-62, overran the runway whilst taking off from Berlin Schönefeld Airport, East Germany, killing 21 of 113 people on board.
- July 19 – United Airlines Flight 232, a McDonnell Douglas DC-10, suffered a complete hydraulic system failure over Iowa, United States, after the tail-mounted engine disintegrated. The crew maintained partial control of the aircraft using differential throttle, bringing it to a crash landing on the runway at Sioux City, Iowa. Of the 296 people on board, 112 died.
- July 21 – Philippine Airlines Flight 124, a BAC One-Eleven, overran the runway during landing at Manila International Airport, due to heavy rain. No one on board was killed but 8 people on the ground perished.
- July 27 – Korean Air Flight 803, a McDonnell Douglas DC-10, crashed while attempting to land in heavy fog at Tripoli, Libya; 75 of the 199 passengers and crew were killed, along with four people on the ground.
- August 3 – Olympic Aviation Flight 545, a Shorts 330–220, crashed into Mount Kerkis in Greece. All 34 passengers and crew were killed.
- August 15 – China Eastern Airlines Flight 5510, an Antonov An-24, crashed on takeoff from Shanghai Hongqiao International Airport due to an engine failure. All six crew members and 28 of the 34 passengers were killed.
- August 25 – Pakistan International Airlines Flight 404, a Fokker F27, disappeared on a flight with 54 on board; the wreckage has never been found.
- September 3 – Cubana de Aviación Flight 9046, an Ilyushin Il-62M, crashed while trying to take off from José Martí International Airport in Havana, Cuba. All 126 people on board plus 24 people on the ground were killed in the crash.
- September 3 – Varig Flight 254, a Boeing 737, ran out of fuel because of incorrect navigation and crashed in the Brazilian jungle, killing 12 of the 54 people on board.
- September 8 – Partnair Flight 394, a Convair 580, crashed into the North Sea after its tail section fell off in mid-air. All 55 people on board died. The disaster was blamed on counterfeit aircraft parts.
- September 19 – UTA Flight 772, a McDonnell Douglas DC-10, exploded in mid-air over the Sahara Desert when a bomb hidden in its forward cargo hold detonated. All 170 people on board were killed. Responsibility for the bombing was later traced back to Abdullah Senussi, the brother-in-law of Libyan leader Muammar al-Gaddafi, whose government in 2003 agreed to pay compensation to the victims.
- September 20 – USAir Flight 5050, a Boeing 737, crashed in Bowery Bay, New York City, after it overran the runway at LaGuardia Airport while attempting to abort takeoff after a tire on a nosewheel burst due to a mistrimmed rudder; two passengers died.
- September 26 – Skylink Airlines Flight 070, a Swearingen Metroliner, dives straight into the ground while conducting a go-around. All 7 occupants were killed.
- October 21 – TAN-SAHSA Flight 414, a Boeing 727, crashed into a mountain known as Cerro de Hula near Tegucigalpa, Honduras, due to pilot error; 131 of 146 on board died.
- October 26 – China Airlines Flight 204, a Boeing 737, crashed into a mountain in the Chiashan range after takeoff from Hualien Airport, due to pilot error; all 54 on board died.
- October 28 – Aloha Island Air Flight 1712, a de Havilland Canada DHC-6 Twin Otter 300 registered as N707PV, crashed into a mountain at night, killing all 20 occupants.
- November 25 – Korean Air Flight 175, a Fokker F28 Fellowship 4000, crashed shortly after takeoff from Gimpo International Airport, due to icing. There were no injuries or fatalities among the 48 on board.
- November 27 – Avianca Flight 203, a Boeing 727, exploded in mid-air over Colombia, killing all 107 people on board and three people on the ground. The Medellín Cartel claimed responsibility for the attack.
- November 27 – a Tepper Aviation Lockheed L-100 Hercules operating a cargo flight from Kamina, Democratic Republic of the Congo, to Jamba, Angola, crashed during the approach to its destination, killing all five people on board.
- December 15 – KLM Flight 867, a Boeing 747 flying from Amsterdam to Anchorage, Alaska, flew through a cloud of volcanic debris, subsequently losing power from all four engines. The crew were able to restart the engines and land the plane safely.
- December 26 – United Express Flight 2415, a BAe Jetstream 31 operated by North Pacific Airlines, crashed while attempting to land at Tri-Cities Airport, Washington. All six passengers and crew were killed.
- December 28 – A TAROM Antonov An-24 crashed near Vișina, Romania, while on a cargo flight from Bucharest, Romania, to Belgrade, Yugoslavia. All seven people on board were killed. The aircraft was probably shot down by the Romanian Army.

== 1990s ==
=== 1990 ===
- January 13 – Aeroflot Flight 6246 crashed near Pervouralsk, Russia, while flying from Tyumen to Ufa; 27 of the 71 people on board were killed.
- January 15 – SANSA Flight 32 crashed into a mountain just after takeoff from Juan Santamaria International Airport in San José, Costa Rica, killing all 20 passengers and three crew.

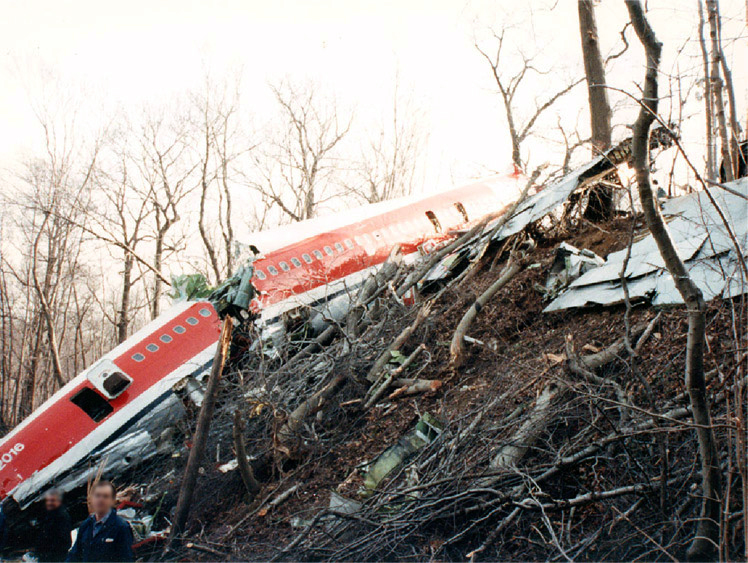
The crash site of Avianca Flight 052

- January 25 – Avianca Flight 052, a Boeing 707, ran out of fuel and crashed while attempting to land at John F. Kennedy International Airport in New York; of the 158 people on board, 85 survived.
- February 12 – TAM Airlines Flight 540, a Fokker F-27, overran the runway and crashed into a residential area, which then collided with a vehicle. Two people on ground died as well as the captain of the 41 on board.
- February 14 – Indian Airlines Flight 605, an Airbus A320, crashed on its final approach to Bangalore Airport; 92 out of 146 people on board were killed.
- April 9 – Atlantic Southeast Airlines Flight 2254, an Embraer EMB 120 Brasilia, collided with a Cessna 172. Both occupants of the Cessna died. Flight 2254 landed safely and all seven on board survived.
- April 12 – Widerøe Flight 839, a DHC-6 Twin Otter, crashed into water just after takeoff from Værøy Airport in Norway, killing all five people on board.
- May 11 – Philippine Airlines Flight 143, a Boeing 737, suffered an explosion and fire while on the ground at Ninoy Aquino International Airport, killing eight of 120 on board.
- May 18 – Aerolift Philippines Flight 075, a Beechcraft 1900, crashed into a house in the suburban Paranaque neighbourhood in Manila, due to engine failure just after takeoff from Ninoy Aquino International Airport; all 21 passengers and crew were killed, along with four people inside the house.
- June 10 – British Airways Flight 5390, a BAC One-Eleven, suffered explosive decompression over Didcot, Oxfordshire, England, when one of the front windscreen panes blew out. The captain was partially blown out of the cockpit, but a flight attendant managed to prevent the unconscious pilot from falling out of the aircraft. The first officer landed the aircraft safely at Southampton Airport. All on board survived.
- August 1 – Aeroflot Flight E-35D, a Yakovlev Yak-40, crashed into a mountain while on the approach to Stepanakert Airport, killing all 46 on board.
- August 2 – British Airways Flight 149, a Boeing 747, was taken hostage by Iraqi forces after it landed at its scheduled stopover at Kuwait International Airport hours after the invasion of Kuwait. All 385 people on board were evacuated and captured, and later released at various stages, but one passenger was murdered by Iraqi soldiers. The empty aircraft was destroyed on the ground in an air attack during the latter stages of the conflict.
- August 19 – Aeroflot Flight 4076, a Tupolev Tu-154, was hijacked by fifteen prisoners, who made 70 passengers and 7 crew members hostages. After the first flight, six prisoners, three guards, and all women and children left the plane while two more prisoners joined. At the third flight, two additional workers join the hijack for help. Lastly, the plane diverted to Karachi and landed there. No one of the 92 on board injured.
- September 11 – A Faucett Perú Boeing 727 on a re-positioning flight disappeared in an area of the Atlantic Ocean approximately 180 miles (160 nmi; 290 km) southeast of Cape Race, Newfoundland, Canada, with 16 passengers and crew on board.
- September 14 – Aeroflot Flight 8175, a Yakovlev Yak-42, crashed during approach into a wooded area, killing four out of 129 people on board.
- October 2 – In the Guangzhou Baiyun airport collisions, a hijacked Boeing 737 operating Xiamen Airlines Flight 8301 clipped China Southwest Airlines Flight 4305, a Boeing 707, during landing at Guangzhou Baiyun International Airport, and collided with CAAC Flight 3523, a Boeing 757; of the 225 occupants of the three aircraft, 128 died.
- November 14 – Alitalia Flight 404, a McDonnell Douglas DC-9, crashed on approach to Zürich Airport, Switzerland, killing all 46 people on board.
- November 17 – A Tupolev Tu-154 operated by Aeroflot performed an emergency landing in a field near Dubenec, Czechoslovakia, due to an in-flight fire. None of the 6 crew members onboard were killed.
- November 21 – Bangkok Airways Flight 125, a de Havilland Canada DHC-8-103, crashed on approach to Koh Samui Airport in Thailand, killing all 33 passengers and five crew.
- December 3 – In the 1990 Wayne County Airport runway collision, Northwest Airlines Flight 1482, a McDonnell Douglas DC-9, collided with Northwest Airlines Flight 299, a Boeing 727, on a runway at Detroit Metropolitan Wayne County Airport; eight of the 54 people on board the DC-9 were killed; all 154 people on board the Boeing 727 survived.

=== 1991 ===
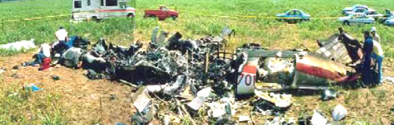
Wreckage of Continental Express Flight 2574

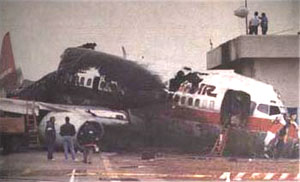
Wreckage of USAir Flight 1493 after the 1991 Los Angeles airport runway collision

- February 1 – In the 1991 Los Angeles airport runway collision, USAir Flight 1493, a Boeing 737 landing at Los Angeles International Airport, collided with SkyWest Airlines Flight 5569, a Fairchild Metro commuter plane waiting to take off from the same runway. All 12 people on board the Metro and 23 of the 89 on the Boeing 737 were killed.
- February 11 – An Interflug Airbus A310 arriving from Berlin had control problems on approach to Moscow. The crew manage to land safely, and all 109 people on board survived.
- February 17 – Ryan International Airlines Flight 590, a Douglas DC-9, crashed on takeoff from Cleveland Hopkins International Airport, Ohio, killing both pilots.
- February 20 – LAN Chile Flight 1069, a BAe 146, overran the runway while landing at Puerto Williams, Chile, killing 20 of the 72 people on board.
- March 3 – United Airlines Flight 585, a Boeing 737, crashed while attempting to land at Colorado Springs Airport, Colorado, killing all 25 people on board. The cause of the crash was later attributed to defects in a valve associated with the rudder.
- March 5 – Aeropostal Alas de Venezuela Flight 108, a McDonnell Douglas DC-9, crashed into a mountain shortly after taking off from La Chinita International Airport, Venezuela. All 45 passengers and crew were killed.
- March 23 – An Aeroflot Antonov An-24 crashed on landing at Navoiy airport, killing 34 of the 63 people on board.
- March 26 to 27 – Pakistani militants hijacked Singapore Airlines Flight 117, an Airbus A310 en route to Singapore Changi Airport, where, upon landing, the plane was stormed by Singapore Special Operations forces. All of the hijackers were killed, with no fatalities among the passengers and crew.
- April 5 – Atlantic Southeast Airlines Flight 2311, an Embraer EMB 120RT, rolled sharply and crashed on final approach to Brunswick, Georgia, killing all 23 people on board.
- April 18 – Air Tahiti Flight 805, a Dornier Do 228, crashed on approach to Nuku Hiva after a flight from Hiva Oa, due to an engine failure; 10 of the 22 people on board were killed.
- May 23 – Aeroflot Flight 8556, a Tupolev Tu-154, hit the ground short of the runway after an unstabilized approach; 13 people were killed.
- May 26 – Lauda Air Flight 004, a Boeing 767, disintegrated in mid-air over Uthai Thani Province and Suphan Buri Province, Thailand, killing all 223 people on board. A thrust reverser had accidentally deployed in flight, causing the disaster. It was the first fatal crash of a Boeing 767 and the deadliest crash in Thailand's history.
- July 10 – L'Express Airlines Flight 508, a Beechcraft Model 99, crashed while on approach to Birmingham Municipal Airport, Alabama, due to severe thunderstorms, killing 13 people on board.
- July 11 – Nigeria Airways Flight 2120, a Nationair McDonnell Douglas DC-8 chartered by Nigeria Airways to transport Nigerian pilgrims to Mecca, crashed shortly after takeoff from King Abdulaziz International Airport, Jeddah, Saudi Arabia, because of a fire caused by tire failure, killing all 261 people on board, including 14 Canadian crew members. This is the deadliest crash involving a McDonnell Douglas DC-8.
- August 13 – TAROM Flight 785A, an Ilyushin Il-18, crashed into the Retezat Mountains while descending to Timișoara Traian Vuia International Airport. All five crew members and four passengers were killed.
- August 16 – Indian Airlines Flight 257, a Boeing 737, hit high ground during descent about 30 km from Imphal Airport. All six crew members and 63 passengers were killed.
- September 11 – Continental Express Flight 2574, an Embraer EMB 120RT, crashed on descent near Eagle Lake, Texas, killing all 14 people on board. Maintenance crews had traded work shifts during repairs to the horizontal stabilizer, inadvertently leaving 47 bolts missing. Reformers pointed to this error and called for development of a "safety culture".
- September 26 – A Polet Airlines Antonov An-24 crashed into the Gulf of Finland after takeoff from Saint Petersburg due to unknown causes, killing all 10 people on board.
- November 7 – Yugavia Flight S-519 crashed on Mount Kukurtbash, Soviet Union, while en route from Elista to Makhachkala, due to ATC and pilot error. All 51 people on board were killed.
- December 27 – Both engines of Scandinavian Airlines System Flight 751, a McDonnell Douglas MD-81, disintegrated shortly after takeoff from Stockholm Arlanda Airport. The pilots made an emergency landing on a nearby field, injuring 25 of those on board. No deaths were reported in the crash.
- December 29 – China Airlines Flight 358, a Boeing 747 freighter, suffered double engine separation and crashed into a hill near Wanli, Taipei, Taiwan, killing all five crew.

=== 1992 ===
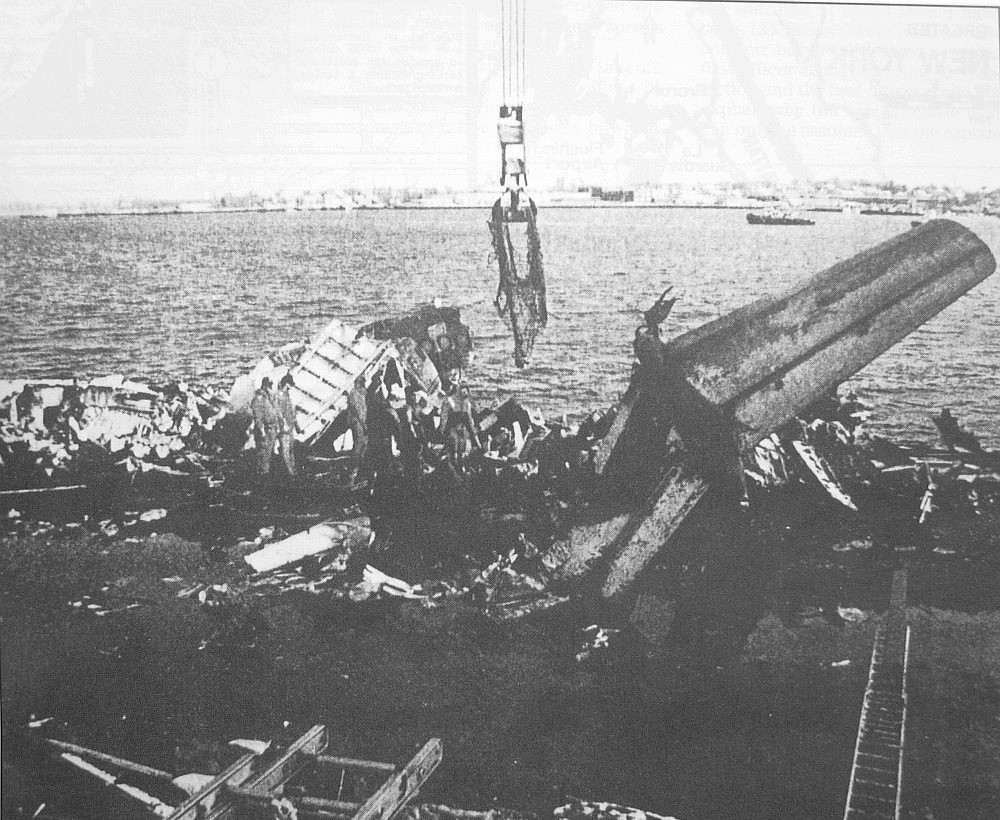
Wreckage of USAir Flight 405

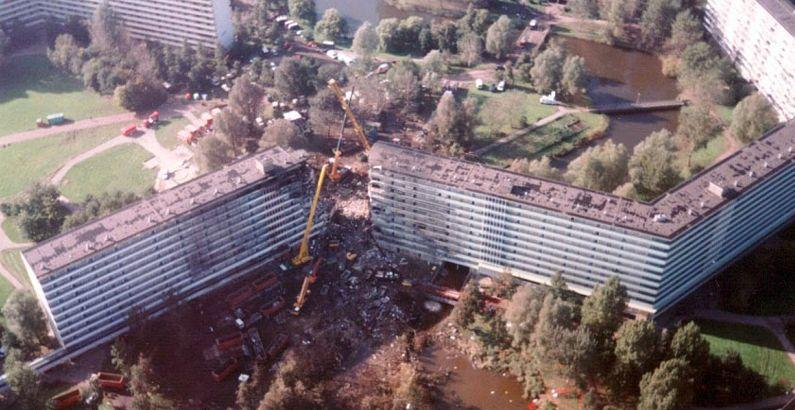
Flats in the Bijlmermeer neighbourhood after being hit by El Al Flight 1862

- January 3 – CommutAir Flight 4281, a Beechcraft 1900C, crashed on approach into Adirondack Regional Airport, New York. Two of the four occupants were killed.
- January 20 – Air Inter Flight 148, an Airbus A320, crashed in the Vosges Mountains on approach to Strasbourg, France, killing 87 of 96 people on board.
- February 9 – A Gambcrest Convair CV-640 on a domestic flight in Senegal from Diass to Cap Skirring, crashed on approach to its destination. 31 of the 59 people on board were killed.
- February 14 – On Aerolíneas Argentinas Flight 386, a Boeing 747-287B flying from Buenos Aires, Argentina, to Los Angeles, California, United States, food contaminated with cholera was fed to passengers, 76 of whom later became ill as a result; one passenger died.
- February 15 – Air Transport International Flight 805, a Douglas DC-8 operated by Burlington Air Express, crashed during a second go-around attempt at Toledo Express Airport, Ohio, killing all four people on board and injuring 13 people on the ground.
- March 22 – USAir Flight 405, a Fokker F-28, crashed on takeoff from New York after suffering ice build-up; 27 of the 51 people on board were killed.
- March 30 – Aviaco Flight 231, a McDonnell Douglas DC-9 arriving from Madrid, crashed and split in half during landing at Granada. All 99 people on board survived, with 26 being injured.
- March 31 – Trans-Air Service Flight 671, a Boeing 707-321C, experienced an in-flight separation of two engines on the right wing. Despite substantial control difficulties and a fire that broke out on the right wing during approach, the pilots landed the plane safely at a military airbase in Istres, France. None of the five occupants was injured.
- June 6 – Copa Airlines Flight 201, a Boeing 737-200 Advanced, crashed near Darién, Panama, killing all 47 passengers and crew; a faulty altitude indicator was the cause.
- June 7 – American Eagle Flight 5456, a CASA C-212 Aviocar operated by Executive Airlines, crashed on approach into Eugenio María de Hostos Airport, Puerto Rico. All five passengers and crew were killed.
- June 8 – GP Express Flight 861, a Beechcraft Model 99, crashed on approach into Anniston Metropolitan Airport, Alabama. Three of the six passengers and crew were killed.
- June 22 – VASP Cargo Flight 780, an Boeing 737-200, collided with the ground on the banks of the Moa River, Brazil, during the landing phase, killing all three crew members.
- July 20 – A Transair Georgia Tupolev Tu-154 on a cargo flight to Mineralnye Vody, Russia, crashed on takeoff from Tbilisi, Georgia, killing all 24 people on board and four people on the ground.
- July 24 – Mandala Airlines Flight 660, a Vickers Viscount 816, crashed on approach to Pattimura Airport, Ambon, Indonesia, killing all 63 passengers and seven crew.

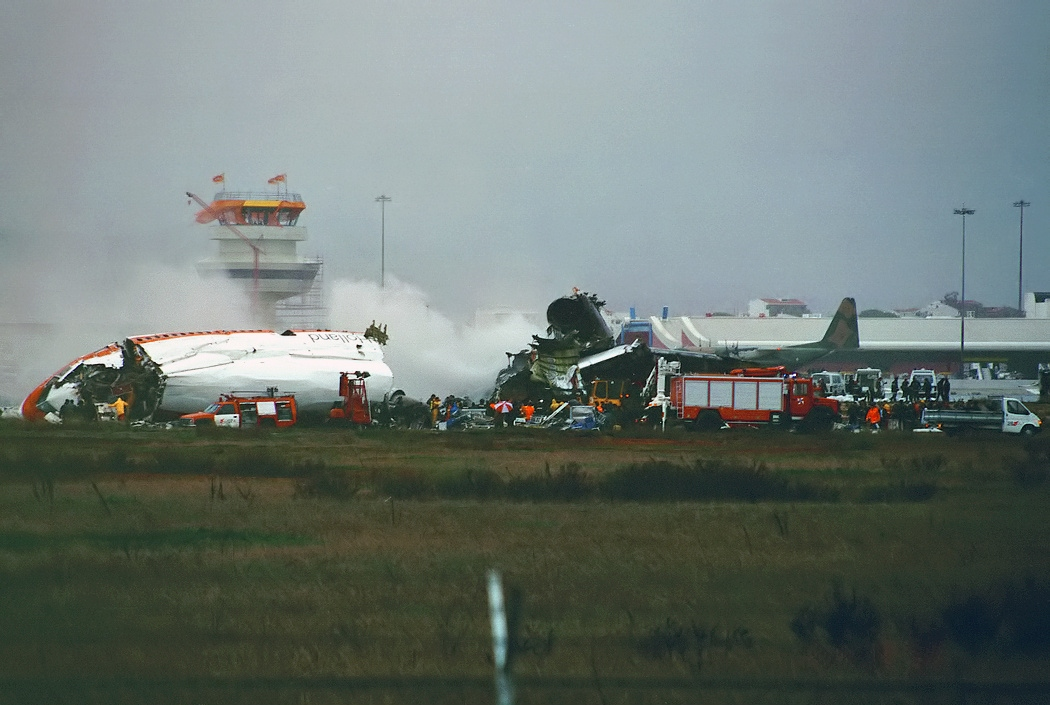
The aftermath of the disaster of Martinair Flight 495, one hour after the crash

- July 30 – TWA Flight 843 aborted takeoff at John F. Kennedy International Airport. The Lockheed L-1011 turned off the runway onto grass in order to avoid striking a concrete barrier. The plane was destroyed by fire shortly after all 292 passengers and crew evacuated with no loss of life.
- July 31 – Thai Airways International Flight 311, an Airbus A310, crashed on approach into Kathmandu, Nepal, killing all 14 crew and 99 passengers.
- July 31 – China General Aviation Flight 7552, a Yakovlev 42D, lost control just after takeoff from Nanjing Airport and crashed into a pond; 108 of 126 on board died.
- August 27 – Aeroflot Flight 2808, a Tupolev Tu-134, crashed into buildings while attempting to land at Ivanovo Yuzhny Airport, Russia, killing all 84 on board.
- September 4 – Vietnam Airlines Flight 850, an Airbus A310-200, was hijacked by a former pilot in the Republic of Vietnam Air Force. He then dropped anti-communist leaflets over Ho Chi Minh City before parachuting out. Vietnamese security forces later arrested him on the ground. The aircraft landed safely, and no one on board was injured.
- September 28 – Pakistan International Airlines Flight 268, an Airbus A300, crashed near Kathmandu, Nepal, killing all 12 crew and 155 passengers.
- October 4 – El Al Flight 1862, a Boeing 747 on a cargo flight, crashed into high-rise apartment buildings in Amsterdam after two of its engines detached from the wing; 43 people, including the plane's crew of three plus an additional passenger, were killed.
- October 8 – Wuhan Airlines Flight 4211, an Ilyushin Il-14, suffered an engine failure on takeoff and crashed into a mountain range, killing 14 of the 35 occupants onboard.
- October 18 – Merpati Nusantara Airlines Flight 5601, a CASA/IPTN CN-235, crashed into Mount Papandayan, near the town of Garut in Indonesia. All 31 passengers and crew were killed.
- November 14 – Vietnam Airlines Flight 474, a Yakovlev Yak-40, crashed while on approach to Nha Trang Airport in a tropical storm; 30 of the 31 people on board were killed.
- November 15 – An Aero Caribbean Il-18 crashed into a side of hill during a nighttime approach, killing all 34 on board.
- November 24 – China Southern Airlines Flight 3943, a Boeing 737-300, crashed on descent to Guilin Airport, killing all 141 on board.
- December 21 – Martinair Flight 495, a McDonnell Douglas DC-10, crashed in Faro, Portugal, killing 54 people and injuring 106.
- December 22 – Libyan Arab Airlines Flight 1103, a Boeing 727, collided with a Libyan Air Force MiG-23 near Tripoli International Airport, killing all 157 people on board the 727. The two crew in the MiG-23 survived and later disputed the official explanation for the crash, claiming that the 727 was purposely destroyed while they were flying nearby.

=== 1993 ===
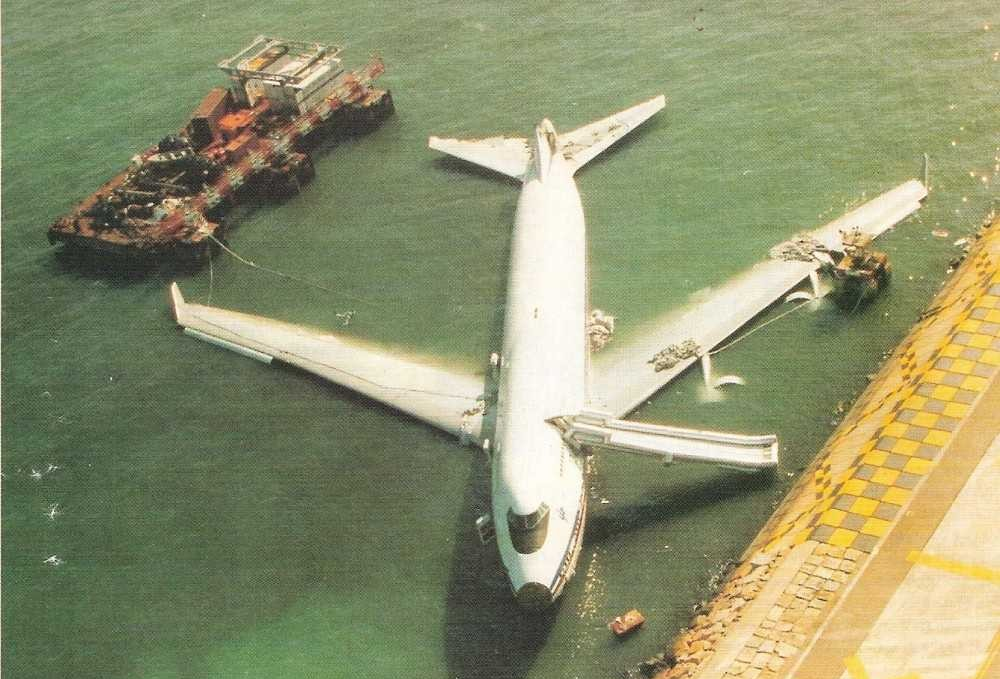
Wreckage of China Airlines Flight 605 after overshooting the runway

- January 6 – Lufthansa CityLine Flight 5634, a de Havilland Canada DHC-8, crashed short of the runway at Paris–Charles de Gaulle Airport, killing four of 23 on board.
- February 8 – In the 1993 Tehran mid-air collision, an Iran Air Tours Tupolev Tu-154 collided in mid-air with an Iranian Air Force Sukhoi Su-24, killing all 133 on board both aircraft.
- February 11 – Lufthansa Flight 592, an Airbus A310-300, was hijacked and forced to fly to John F. Kennedy International Airport. The plane landed safely and the hijacker surrendered. All 104 on board survived.
- March 5 – Palair Macedonian Airlines Flight 301, a Fokker 100, crashed shortly after takeoff from Skopje Airport in Macedonia; 83 of the 97 passengers and crew were killed.
- March 31 – Japan Air Lines Cargo Flight 46E, a Boeing 747-121F flying from Anchorage to Chicago, encountered severe turbulence over Alaska that caused the detachment of its number-two engine. The aircraft made a successful emergency landing in Anchorage, with no injuries among the five on board.
- April 6 – China Eastern Airlines Flight 583, a McDonnell Douglas MD-11, made an emergency landing at Shemya Air Force Base after the slats were accidentally deployed in mid-air near the Aleutian Islands; all on board initially survived, but two died later.
- April 6 - TACA Flight 510, a Boeing 767, overran the runway and crashed through houses. No one of the 226 occupants died, but 5 on board and 3 on ground were injured.
- April 14 – American Airlines Flight 102, a McDonnell Douglas DC-10, veered off the runway on landing at Dallas/Fort Worth International Airport; all on board survived.
- April 18 – Japan Air System Flight 451, a McDonnell Douglas DC-9, encountered windshear and skidded off the runway at Hanamaki Airport; all 77 people on board survived, but there were 19 injuries
- April 24 – Indian Airlines Flight 427, a Boeing 737-200, was hijacked on a flight between New Delhi and Srinagar, India. The plane landed at Amritsar Airport, where it was stormed by commandos; the hijacker was killed and the 140 passengers and crew survived without injury.
- April 26 – Indian Airlines Flight 491, a Boeing 737, struck a large vehicle on a road while trying to take off from Aurangabad Airport, leading to a crash that killed 55 of the 118 people on board.
- May 19 – SAM Colombia Flight 501, a Boeing 727, crashed into Mount Paramo Frontino, killing all 132 on board.
- July 1 – Merpati Nusantara Airlines Flight 724, a Fokker F28, collided with a small hill near the sea, then broke up and plunged into the sea shortly afterwards, killing 41 people on board.
- July 23 – China Northwest Airlines Flight 2119, a BAe 146, overran the runway at Yinchuan Hedong Airport, Ningxia, China, after an aborted takeoff; the aircraft crashed into a lake, killing 54 passengers and one crew member.
- July 26 – Asiana Airlines Flight 733, a Boeing 737, crashed into a mountain in Haenam, South Korea, after failed landing attempts, killing 68 of the 116 people on board; this crash was the first loss of a Boeing 737-500.
- August 18 – American International Airways Flight 808, a DC-8, stalled on approach to Guantanamo Bay and crashed. All those on board survived.
- August 26 – Sakha Avia Flight 301, a Let L-410 Turbolet, crashed on approach to Aldan Airport in Russia, killing all 24 people on board.
- August 28 – A Tajik Air Yakovlev Yak-40 crashed after overshooting the runway on takeoff from Khorog Airport, killing 82 of the 86 people on board; the accident is the deadliest involving the Yak-40 as well as the deadliest accident in Tajikistan to date.
- August 31 – An Everest Air Dornier Do 228 crashed near Bharatpur in Nepal, killing all 19 people on board.
- September 12 – Air France Flight 072, a Boeing 747-428, overran the runway and came to rest at a lagoon. No one was killed though 4 injuries were reported of the 272 on board.

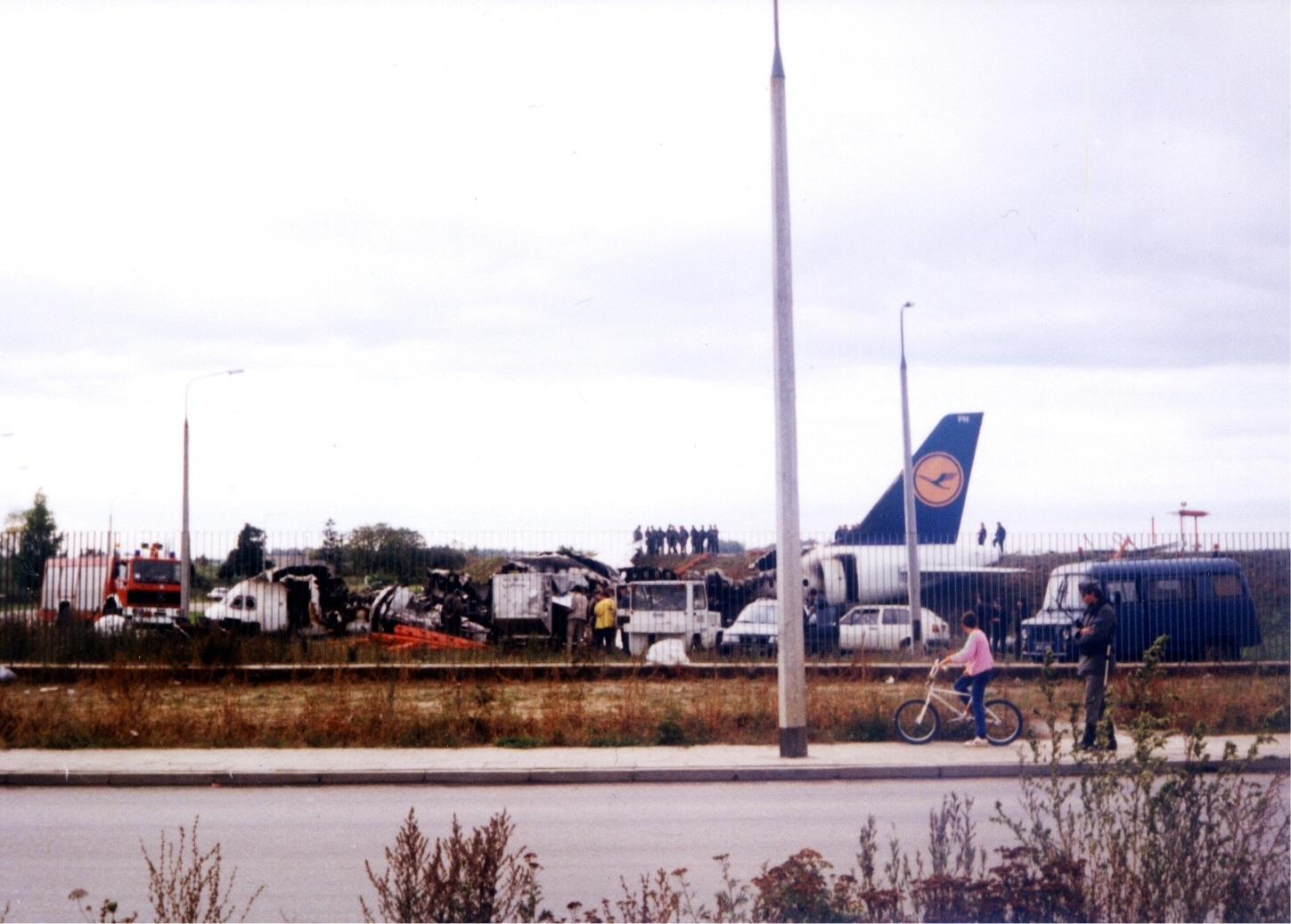
Burnt out wreckage of Lufthansa Flight 2904

- September 14 – Lufthansa Flight 2904, an Airbus A320, crashed after overrunning the runway in Warsaw, Poland, killing two and injuring 68 of the 72 people on board.
- September 21 – In the first of the three 1993 Sukhumi airliner attacks, a Transair Georgia Tupolev Tu-134A was hit by a surface-to-air missile while on approach to Sukhumi-Babusheri Airport; the plane crashed into the Black Sea, killing all five crew members and all 22 passengers.
- September 22 – In the second of the three 1993 Sukhumi airliner attacks, an Orbi Georgian Airways Tupolev Tu-154 carrying soldiers from Tbilisi was shot down during landing at Sukhumi-Babusheri Airport; the plane crashed on the runway and caught fire, killing 108 of the 132 people on board.
- September 23 – In the third of the three 1993 Sukhumi airliner attacks, a Transair Georgia Tupolev Tu-134A scheduled to fly to Tbilisi was hit on the ground by a rocket, killing one of the 29 people on board.
- October 25 – Nigeria Airways Flight 470, an Airbus A310-221, was hijacked by four teenagers. Out of 149 occupants, one died during the rescue operation.
- October 26 – China Eastern Airlines Flight 5398, a McDonnell Douglas MD-82, overran the runway at Fuzhou Changle International Airport in bad weather, killing two of 80 on board.
- October 27 – Widerøe Flight 744, a de Havilland Canada DHC-6 Twin Otter, crashed in Overhalla, Norway, on approach to Namsos Airport, killing both pilots and four passengers; the crash is also known as the Namsos Accident.
- November 4 – China Airlines Flight 605, a Boeing 747-400, overran Kai Tak Airport's runway 13 on landing during a typhoon; the aircraft was unable to stop before sliding into Hong Kong's Victoria Harbour, but all 296 on board escaped safely; this was the first loss of a Boeing 747-400.
- November 13 – China Northern Airlines Flight 6901, a McDonnell Douglas MD-82, crashed on approach to Ürümqi Diwopu International Airport, Xinjiang, China, killing 12 of the 102 on board; pilot error was blamed.
- November 15 – Aviastar Airlines Flight 051, an Antonov An-124 flying from Dubai to Tashkent, crashed into mountains on approach to its stopover in Kerman, Iran. All 17 people on board were killed.
- November 20 – Avioimpex Flight 110, a Yakovlev Yak-42, crashed on approach to Ohrid Airport in Macedonia; all 116 passengers and crew died as a result of the crash, though one passenger lived for 11 days before succumbing to his injuries.
- December 1 – Northwest Airlink Flight 5719, a Jetstream 31, crashed into two ridges east of Hibbing, Minnesota, killing all 18 on board.
- December 26 – Kuban Airlines Flight 5719, an Antonov An-24, crashed due to overloading while attempting a go-around at Shirak International Airport, Armenia. Of the 36 passengers and crew, only one survived the crash.

=== 1994 ===
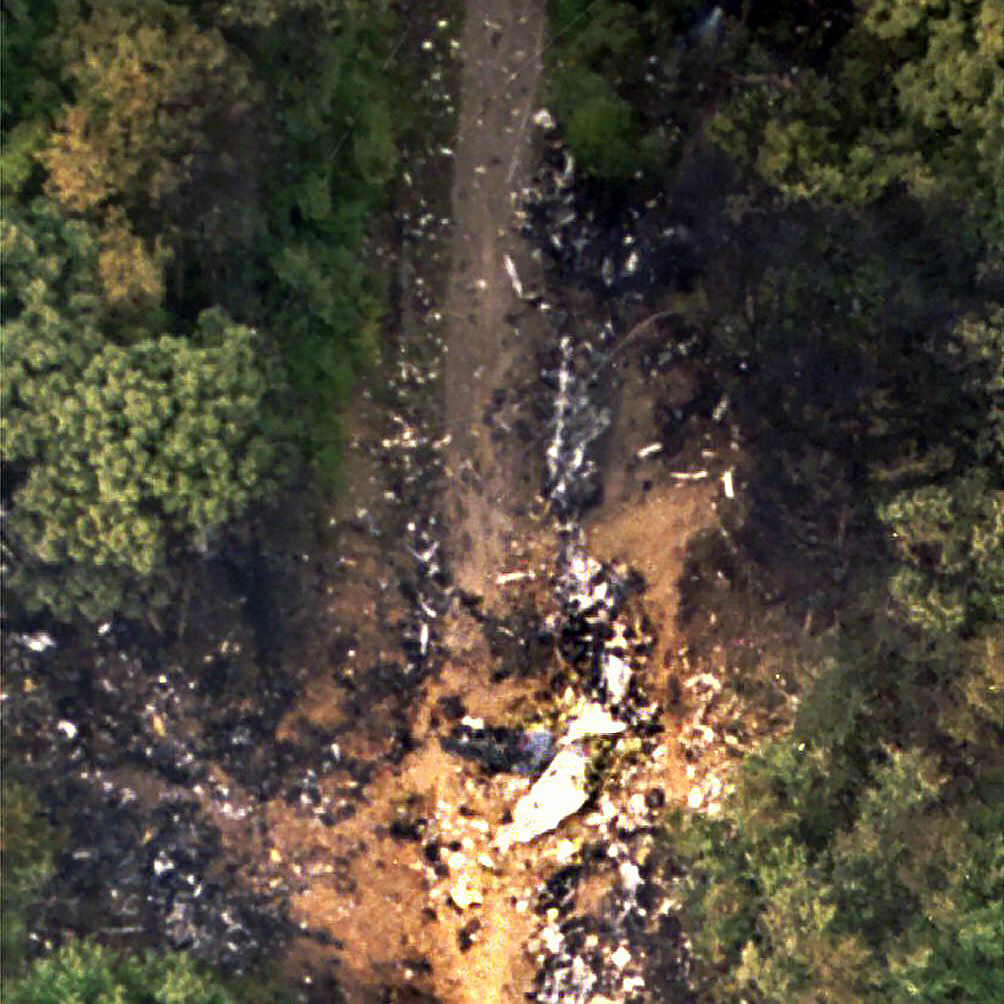
Crater left by the impact of USAir Flight 427

- January 3 – Baikal Airlines Flight 130, a Tupolev Tu-154, crashed near Irkutsk, Russia, after the hydraulic system failed due to an engine fire, killing all 124 on board and one person on the ground.
- January 7 – United Express Flight 6291, a BAe Jetstream 41, crashed on approach to Port Columbus International Airport, Ohio. Five of the eight passengers and crew were killed.
- February 24 – Pulkovo Aviation Enterprise Flight 9045, an Antonov An-12BP, crashed on approach to Nalchik Airport, Russia. All 13 passengers and crew were killed. The aircraft was carrying 12,515 kg of coins from the Saint Petersburg Mint.
- February 25 – Expresso Aéreo Flight 028, a Yakovlev Yak-40 flying from Juanjuí to Lima, Peru, crashed into Mount Carpish. All 31 people on board were killed.
- March 8 – A Sahara Airlines Boeing 737 crashed into an Aeroflot Ilyushin Il-86 at New Delhi, India, during a training flight, killing all eight on both aircraft and one on the ground.
- March 21 – Aviaco Flight 260, a McDonnell Douglas DC-9, crashed short of the runway during the approach to Vigo-Peinador Airport, injuring 62 of the 116 on board, but no one died.
- March 23 – Aeroflot Flight 593, an Airbus A310, crashed into a wooded hillside in Siberia. All 75 passengers and crew were killed.
- April 4 – KLM Cityhopper Flight 433, a Saab 340, crashed while trying to return to Schiphol Airport, Amsterdam, due to pilot error and equipment failure; the pilot and two passengers died and nine passengers were injured.
- April 7 – A FedEx employee tried to hijack Federal Express Flight 705, a McDonnell Douglas DC-10-30; the three crew members were severely injured but managed to subdue the attacker and land the aircraft safely with no loss of life.

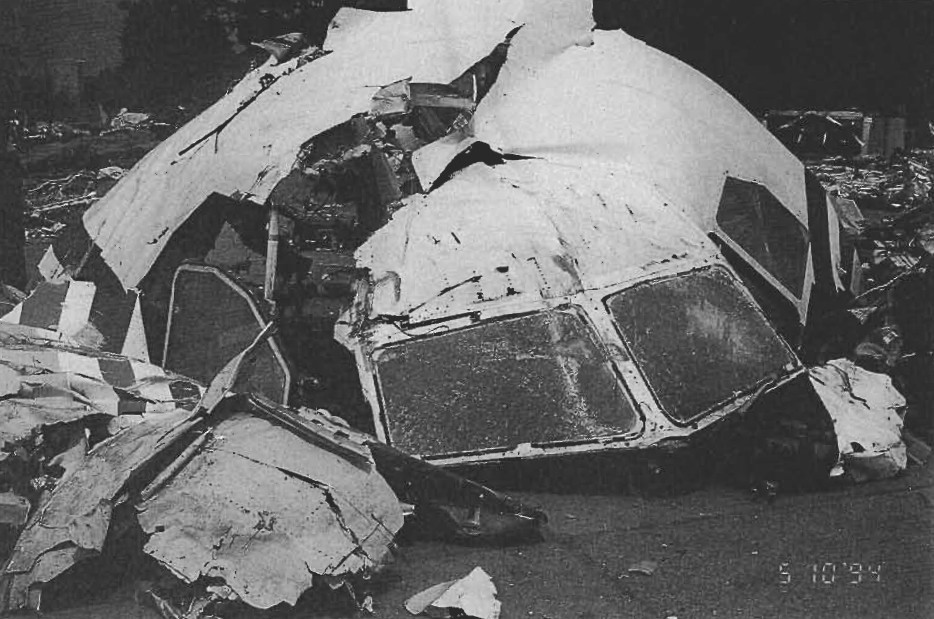
The severed cockpit section of Flight 140 that killed 264 passengers and crew

- April 24 – A South Pacific Airmotive Douglas DC-3 ditched in Botany Bay, Australia, after an engine failure. All 25 people on board survived, with only one injury.
- April 26 – China Airlines Flight 140, an Airbus A300, crashed while landing at Nagoya, Japan, as a result of pilot error; 264 of the 271 people on board died.
- June 6 – China Northwest Airlines Flight 2303, a Tupolev Tu-154M, broke up in mid-air and crashed near Xian, China, killing all 160 on board. The deadliest airplane crash ever to occur in China was attributed to a maintenance error.
- June 30 – Airbus Industrie Flight 129, an Airbus A330-321, crashed after takeoff, killing all seven on board. Pilot fatigue led to the plane climbing steeply at less than minimum speed. It was the first fatal accident involving an Airbus A330, as well as the first hull loss of the type.
- July 1 – Air Mauritanie Flight 625, a Fokker F28 Fellowship, crashed after landing at Tidjikja Airport, Mauritania, in a sandstorm; 80 of the 93 passengers and crew were killed.
- July 2 – USAir Flight 1016, a McDonnell Douglas DC-9, crashed while attempting to land at Charlotte, North Carolina, during a thunderstorm; 37 of the 57 people on board were killed.
- July 19 – Alas Chiricanas Flight 901, an Embraer EMB-110, exploded in mid-air over Panama, killing all 21 people on board. Investigators concluded that a suicide bomber was responsible, although the motives and affiliation of the bomber remain unclear.
- August 10 – Korean Air Flight 2033, an Airbus A300B4-622R, overran the runway at Jeju International Airport, Jeju, South Korea. None of the 160 occupants died, although eight people were injured.
- August 21 – Royal Air Maroc Flight 630, an ATR-42, was deliberately crashed into the Atlas Mountains, killing all 44 on board.
- September 8 – USAir Flight 427, a Boeing 737, crashed while attempting to land at Pittsburgh International Airport, killing all 132 people on board. Investigations showed that a fault in the Boeing 737 rudder was to blame for the crash.
- September 18 – An Oriental Airlines BAC One-Eleven crashed near its stopover in Tamanrasset, Algeria. The plane was carrying the Iwuanyanwu Nationale football team from Tunisia to Nigeria. Five of the 39 people on board were killed.
- September 26 – In the 1994 Vanavara air disaster, a Yakovlev Yak-40 operated by Cheremshanka Airlines crashed near Vanavara, Russia, after running out of fuel in bad weather, killing 28 passengers and crew.
- October 12 – Iran Aseman Airlines Flight 746, a Fokker F-28, crashed into a mountain near Natanz, Iran, due to double engine failure, killing all 66 on board.
- October 31 – American Eagle Flight 4184, an ATR 72 turboprop, crashed near Roselawn, Indiana, while waiting to land at Chicago, because of ice buildup on its wings. All 68 people on board died.
- November 3 – Scandinavian Airlines System Flight 347, a McDonnell Douglas MD-82 operating a domestic flight in Norway, was hijacked by a Bosnian national; after landing at Bodø Airport to release some hostages, the aircraft flew on to Oslo Airport, where the hijacker later surrendered.
- November 22 – TWA Flight 427, a McDonnell Douglas MD-82, collided with a Superior Aviation Cessna 441 on the runway at Lambert–St. Louis International Airport, killing the pilot and passenger in the Cessna; there were no fatalities on board the MD-82.
- December 11 – A bomb exploded on board Philippine Airlines Flight 434, a Boeing 747, killing one passenger, in a prelude to the terrorist Bojinka plot. Despite subsequent difficulties in controlling the aircraft, the crew succeeded in making an emergency landing at Naha, Okinawa.
- December 13 – Flagship Airlines Flight 3379, a BAe Jetstream, crashed while attempting a go-around at Raleigh-Durham International Airport, North Carolina. Both crew members and 13 of the 18 passengers died.
- December 19 – Nigeria Airways Flight 9805, a Boeing 707 operating a cargo flight between Saudi Arabia and Nigeria, suffered an in-flight fire before crashing into marshland in Nigeria; both passengers and one of the three crew members were killed.
- December 21 – Air Algérie Flight 702P, a Boeing 737, crashed on approach to Coventry Airport, England, killing all five on board.
- December 24 – Air France Flight 8969, an Airbus A300, was hijacked on the tarmac at Algiers, Algeria, by the militant group GIA. After a two-day standoff, the plane was allowed to fly to Marseille, France, where it was stormed by French commandos, who killed the four hijackers.
- December 29 – Turkish Airlines Flight 278, a Boeing 737-400, crashed on final approach to Van Ferit Melen Airport in eastern Turkey in driving snow. Five of the seven crew and 52 of the 69 passengers were killed.

=== 1995 ===
- January 10 – Merpati Nusantara Airlines Flight 6715, a de Havilland Canada DHC-6 flying from Sumbawa to Ruteng, Indonesia, went missing over the Molo Starit. All 14 people on board are presumed dead.
- January 11 – Intercontinental de Aviación Flight 256, a Douglas DC-9, crashed in a lagoon near María La Baja, Colombia, due to an improperly set altimeter, killing 51 of 52 on board.
- January 19 – Bristow Helicopters Flight 56C, a Eurocopter Super Puma, was struck by lightning and forced to make an emergency landing in the North Sea. All 18 on board survived.
- January 30 – TransAsia Airways Flight 510A, an ATR 72–200 on a re-positioning flight from Penghu to Taipei, Taiwan, crashed into a hill in Guishan District, Taoyuan, killing all four crew members.

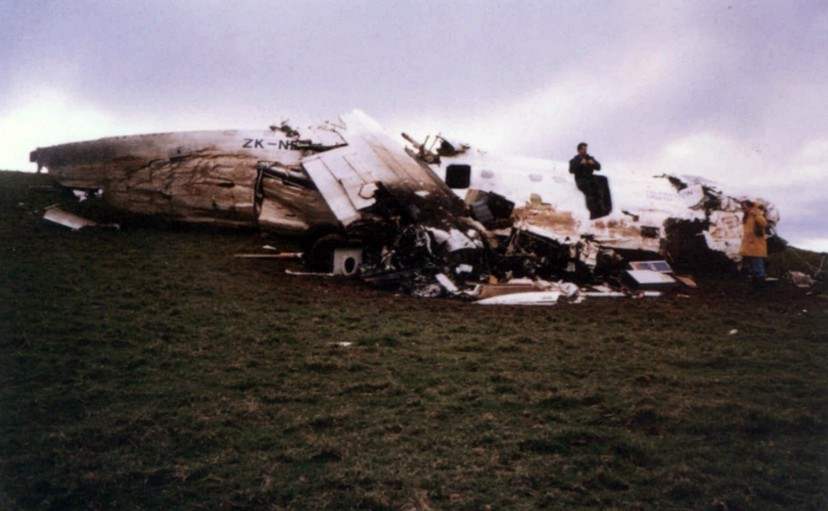
The right side of Ansett New Zealand Flight 703 after crashing

- February 16 – Air Transport International Flight 782, a Douglas DC-8 on a re-positioning flight, crashed after failing to get airborne at Kansas City International Airport, Missouri, killing all three crew members.
- March 31 – TAROM Flight 371, an Airbus A310, crashed near Balotești, Romania, due to mechanical failure and pilot error, killing all 60 on board.
- May 1 – In the 1995 Sioux Lookout mid-air collision Bearskin Airlines Flight 362, a Fairchild Metroliner, collided with Air Sandy 3101, a Piper PA-31. All eight people on board both aircraft were killed.
- May 24 – Knight Air Flight 816, an Embraer EMB 110 Bandeirante, crashed while trying to return to Leeds Bradford Airport, UK, in poor weather. All 12 passengers and crew were killed.
- June 9 – Ansett New Zealand Flight 703, a de Havilland Canada DHC-8, crashed during a landing approach near the Tararua Ranges, New Zealand, killing four of the 21 people on board.
- June 21 – All Nippon Airways Flight 857, a Boeing 747SR, was hijacked on a domestic flight between Tokyo and Hakodate in Japan; after landing at its destination, the aircraft was later stormed by police and the hijacker was arrested; all 365 people on board survived the incident.
- August 3 – In the Airstan incident, an Airstan Ilyushin Il-76TD operated as Flight 199, was intercepted by a Taliban-controlled fighter aircraft before being forced to divert to Kandahar International Airport in Afghanistan; the crew of seven were held captive for over a year before they overpowered their captors and fled in the aircraft.

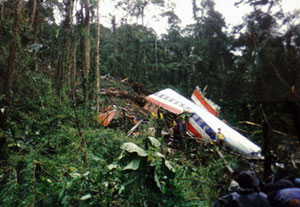
The crash site of American Airlines Flight 965 with a part of the hull after the accident

- August 9 – Aviateca Flight 901, a Boeing 737, crashed into San Vicente volcano in El Salvador while on approach to Cuscatlán International Airport; all 65 on board died.
- August 9 – Inter Austral Flight 2306, a CASA CN-235, suffered from a rear door failure mid-flight over Argentina while on route to El Plumerillo International Airport; a flight attendant was the only fatality.
- August 21 – Atlantic Southeast Airlines Flight 529, an Embraer EMB 120, crashed in a field near Carrollton, Georgia, United States, killing nine of the 29 people on board.
- September 15 – Malaysia Airlines Flight 2133, a Fokker 50, crashed in a shanty town in Malaysia due to pilot error, killing 34 of 53 on board.
- September 19 – Kish Air Flight 707, a Boeing 707 on a domestic flight in Iran from Tehran to Kish, was hijacked by a disgruntled flight attendant armed with a pistol. The aircraft was diverted to Israel, where all the 174 people on board were released.
- September 21 – MIAT Flight 557, an Antonov An-24, crashed into a mountain near Mörön Airport, Mongolia, due to pilot error; of the 43 on board, only a passenger survived. The accident remains the deadliest in Mongolia.
- October 19 – On United Airlines Flight 976, a Boeing 767-300ER, a passenger threatened to crash the plane and kill everyone on board upon landing. The plane landed safely at John F. Kennedy International Airport. The suspect was later arrested. There were no casualties.
- November 8 – LADE Flight 072, a Fokker F27 on a domestic flight in Argentina from Comodoro Rivadavia to Córdoba via Villa Reynolds, crashed into Cerro Los Linderos. All 53 people on board were killed.
- November 12 – American Airlines Flight 1572, a McDonnell Douglas MD-83, collided with trees on approach, causing a loss of both engines. The plane lost altitude, then struck runway antennas, before rolling to a stop. There was one minor injury among the 78 people on board.
- November 13 – Nigeria Airways Flight 357, a Boeing 737, overran the runway while landing at Kaduna Airport; a subsequent fire killed 11 of 138 on board.
- December 3 – Cameroon Airlines Flight 3701, a Boeing 737, crashed while on approach to Douala International Airport, Cameroon; of the 76 on board, five survived.
- December 5 – Azerbaijan Airlines Flight 56, a Tupolev Tu-134, crashed on climbout from Nakhchivan Airport after an engine failed due to improper maintenance, killing 52 of 82 on board.
- December 7 – Khabarovsk United Air Group Flight 3949, a Tupolev Tu-154B, crashed into Bo-Dzhausa Mountain, Russia, after entering a steep downward spiral while at cruising altitude. All 98 passengers and crew were killed.
- December 7 – In the 1995 Air St. Martin Beech 1900 crash, a Beechcraft 1900D crashed near Belle-Anse, Haiti, killing all 20 people on board.
- December 13 – Banat Air Flight 166, a Romavia Antonov An-24, took off from Verona Airport, Italy, then crashed due to overloading and ice accumulation on the wings; all 49 people on board were killed.
- December 18 – In the 1995 Trans Service Airlift Electra crash, a Lockheed L-188 Electra crashed shortly after takeoff from Jamba, Angola, due to overloading and shifting baggage; of the 144 people on board, only three survived.
- December 20 – American Airlines Flight 965, a Boeing 757, crashed into a mountain while approaching Alfonso Bonilla Aragón International Airport in Palmira, Colombia, killing 159 of 163 on board.
- December 20 – Tower Air Flight 41, a Boeing 747, veered off the runway during takeoff from John F. Kennedy International Airport, New York. All 468 people on board survived, but 25 were injured; the aircraft was written off.

=== 1996 ===
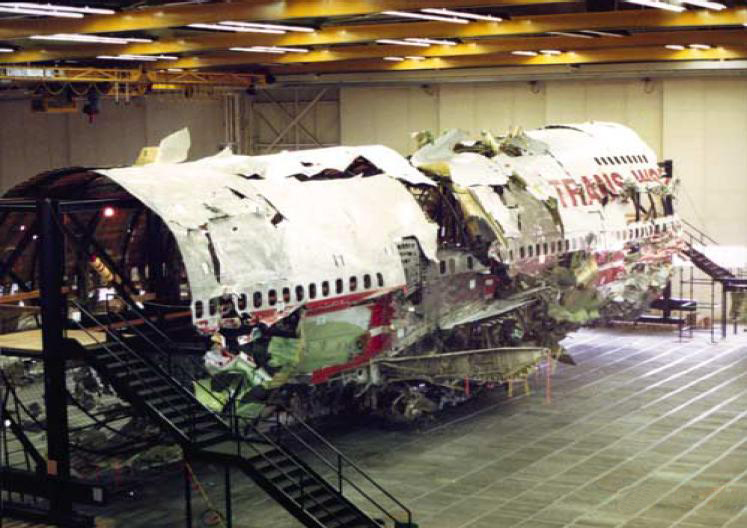
The reconstructed wreckage of Trans World Air Flight 800

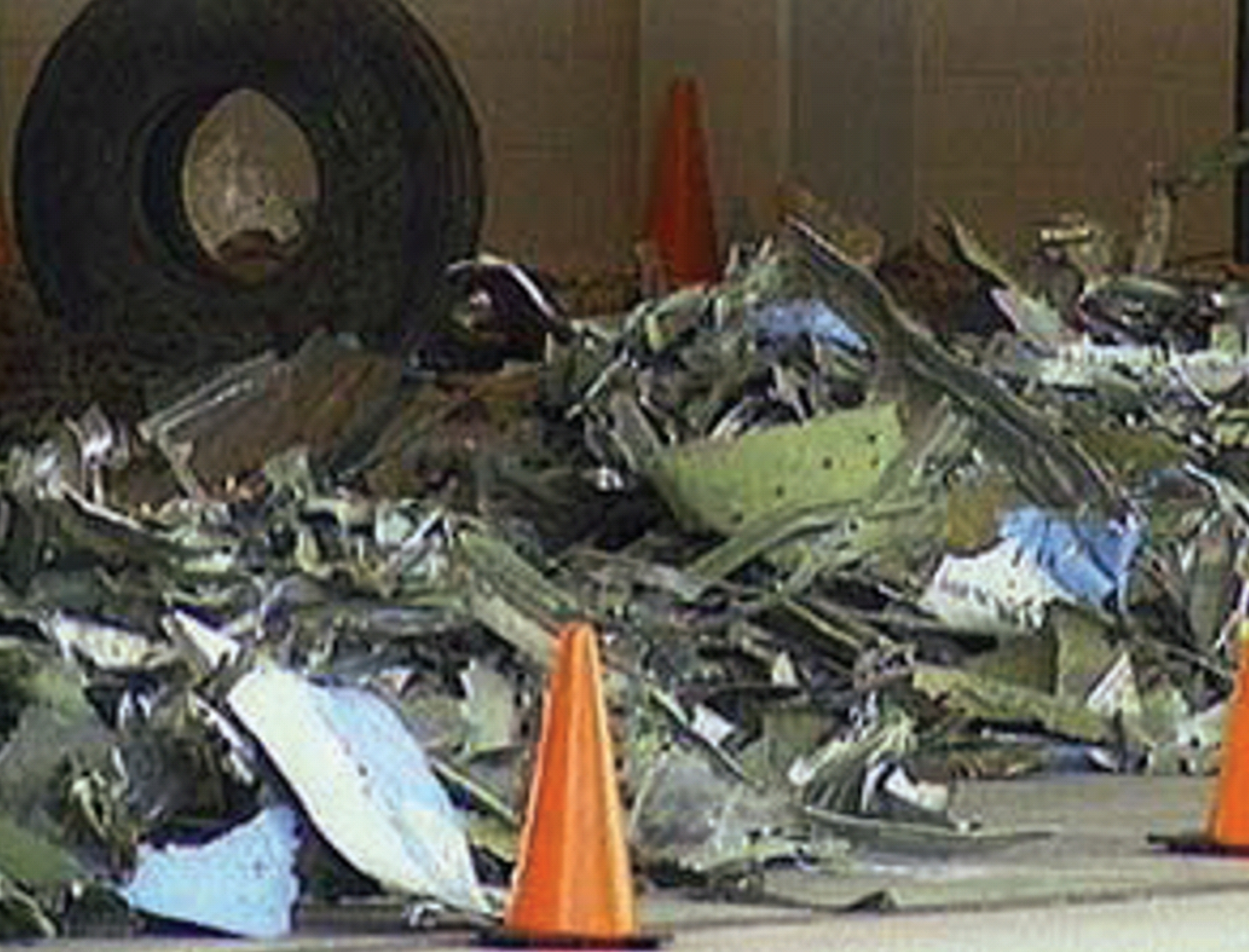
Pieces of ValuJet Flight 592 recovered from the crash site

- January 8 – In the 1996 Air Africa crash, an overloaded Antonov An-32 operated by Moscow Airways aborted takeoff and overran the runway into a market in Kinshasa, Democratic Republic of the Congo, killing 227 people on the ground.
- February 4 – LAC Colombia Flight 028, a McDonnell Douglas DC-8 operating a cargo flight to São Paulo in Brazil, crashed shortly after takeoff from Silvio Pettirossi International airport, Asunción, Paraguay, killing all four crew members and 18 people on the ground.
- February 6 – Birgenair Flight 301, a Boeing 757, crashed into the sea shortly after taking off from Puerto Plata in the Dominican Republic. All 189 passengers and crew were killed.
- February 29 – Faucett Flight 251, a Boeing 737, crashed into a hill while attempting to land at Arequipa, Peru. All 123 people on board died.
- April 5 – Formosa Airlines Flight 7613, a Dornier 228, crashed on approach to Beigan Airport, Taiwan, in poor visibility. All 17 occupants survived the initial crash but six then drowned.
- May 3 – A Federal Airlines Antonov An-24 crashed near Khartoum, Sudan, after a flight from Wadi. All 53 people on board were killed.
- May 11 – ValuJet Flight 592, a McDonnell Douglas DC-9, crashed in the Everglades near Miami, Florida, due to loss of control caused by a fire that started in its cargo hold. All 110 people on board were killed.
- June 9 – Eastwind Airlines Flight 517, a Boeing 737-200, lost rudder control while on approach to Richmond International Airport, Richmond, Virginia, and made an emergency landing; there were no fatalities.
- June 13 – Garuda Indonesia Flight 865, a McDonnell Douglas DC-10, overran the runway following an aborted takeoff due to an engine failure at Fukuoka, Japan, killing three of 275 on board.
- July 6 – Delta Air Lines Flight 1288, a McDonnell Douglas MD-88, experienced an uncontained engine failure during takeoff from Pensacola, Florida. Fragments from one (left) Pratt & Whitney JT8D-219 turbofan engine penetrated the fuselage, killing two and seriously injuring two of the 142 people on board.
- July 17 – TWA Flight 800, a Boeing 747, exploded in mid-air above the sea off East Moriches, New York, killing all 230 people on board.
- August 19 – Spair Airlines Flight 3601, an Ilyushin Il-76, crashed near Belgrade, Yugoslavia, with 11 fatalities.
- August 29 – Vnukovo Airlines Flight 2801, a Tupolev Tu-154, crashed into a mountain on Spitsbergen, an island in the Norwegian archipelago of Svalbard, killing all 141 on board. It remains Norway's worst air disaster to date.
- September 3 – Hemus Air Flight 7081, a Tupolev Tu-154, was hijacked while en route from Beirut, Lebanon, to Varna, Bulgaria. After landing in Varna, the 150 passengers were released in return for fuel. The plane then flew on to Oslo Gardermoen Airport, Norway, where the hijacker later surrendered.
- September 5 – A fire broke out in the cargo hold of FedEx Express Flight 1406, a McDonnell Douglas DC-10F en route from Memphis to Boston. The plane performed an emergency landing at New York Stewart International Airport, where all five crew evacuated, with only two injuries. The plane was destroyed by fire on the runway.
- October 2 – Aeroperú Flight 603, a Boeing 757, crashed into the sea off Pasamayo, Peru, because of a maintenance error. All 70 people on board were killed.
- October 19 – Delta Air Lines Flight 554, a McDonnell Douglas MD-88 flying from Atlanta to New York City, crashed just off the runway at LaGuardia Airport after striking a light structure and a concrete structure. All 63 on board survived, with five minor injuries.
- October 22 – Millon Air Flight 406, a Boeing 707-323C, crashed shortly after takeoff from Manta Airport, Ecuador. All four on board were killed, along with 30 on the ground.
- October 31 – TAM Transportes Aéreos Regionais Flight 402, a Fokker 100, crashed shortly after takeoff from Congonhas-São Paulo Airport, Brazil, striking an apartment building and several houses. All 89 passengers and six crew members died, along with four people on the ground.
- November 7 – ADC Airlines Flight 086, a Boeing 727, crashed when the crew lost control of the aircraft while avoiding a mid-air collision on approach to Lagos, Nigeria. All 144 passengers and crew were killed.
- November 12 – In the 1996 Charkhi Dadri mid-air collision, Saudi Arabian Airlines Flight 763, a Boeing 747, collided in mid-air with Kazakhstan Airlines Flight 1907, an Ilyushin Il-76, near Charkhi Dadri, India. All 312 on board the Boeing 747 and all 37 on board the Ilyushin Il-76 were killed. It is the deadliest mid-air collision in aviation history.
- November 19 – United Express Flight 5925, a Beechcraft 1900, collided with a privately owned Beechcraft King Air at Quincy Regional Airport, Illinois, killing all 14 on board both aircraft.
- November 23 – Ethiopian Airlines Flight 961, a Boeing 767, was hijacked over Kenya. The aircraft ran out of fuel, and the pilot attempted to ditch the aircraft in the sea off Moroni, Comoros. Of the 175 people on board, 125 were killed (including the three hijackers).
- December 7 – Dirgantara Air Service Flight 5940, a CASA C-212 Aviocar, crashed into a gas factory shortly after takeoff from Syamsudin Noor International Airport, Indonesia, following an engine failure; 16 of the 17 passengers and crew were killed, as well as two on the ground.
- December 22 – Airborne Express Flight 827, a McDonnell Douglas DC-8-63F, stalled and crashed into East River Mountain in Narrows, Virginia, United States, killing all six on board.

=== 1997 ===
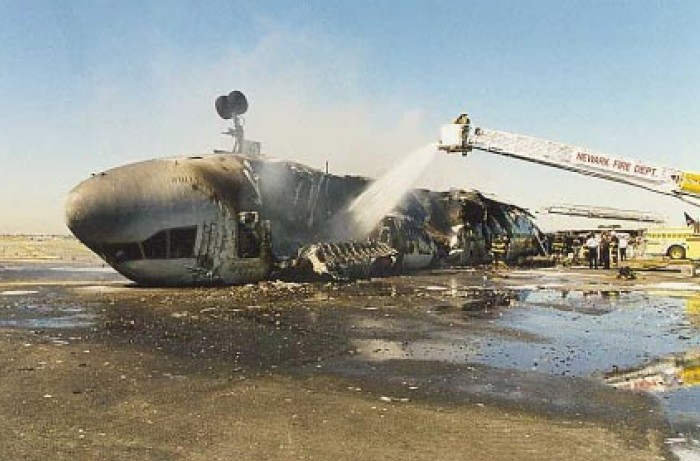
FedEx Express Flight 14

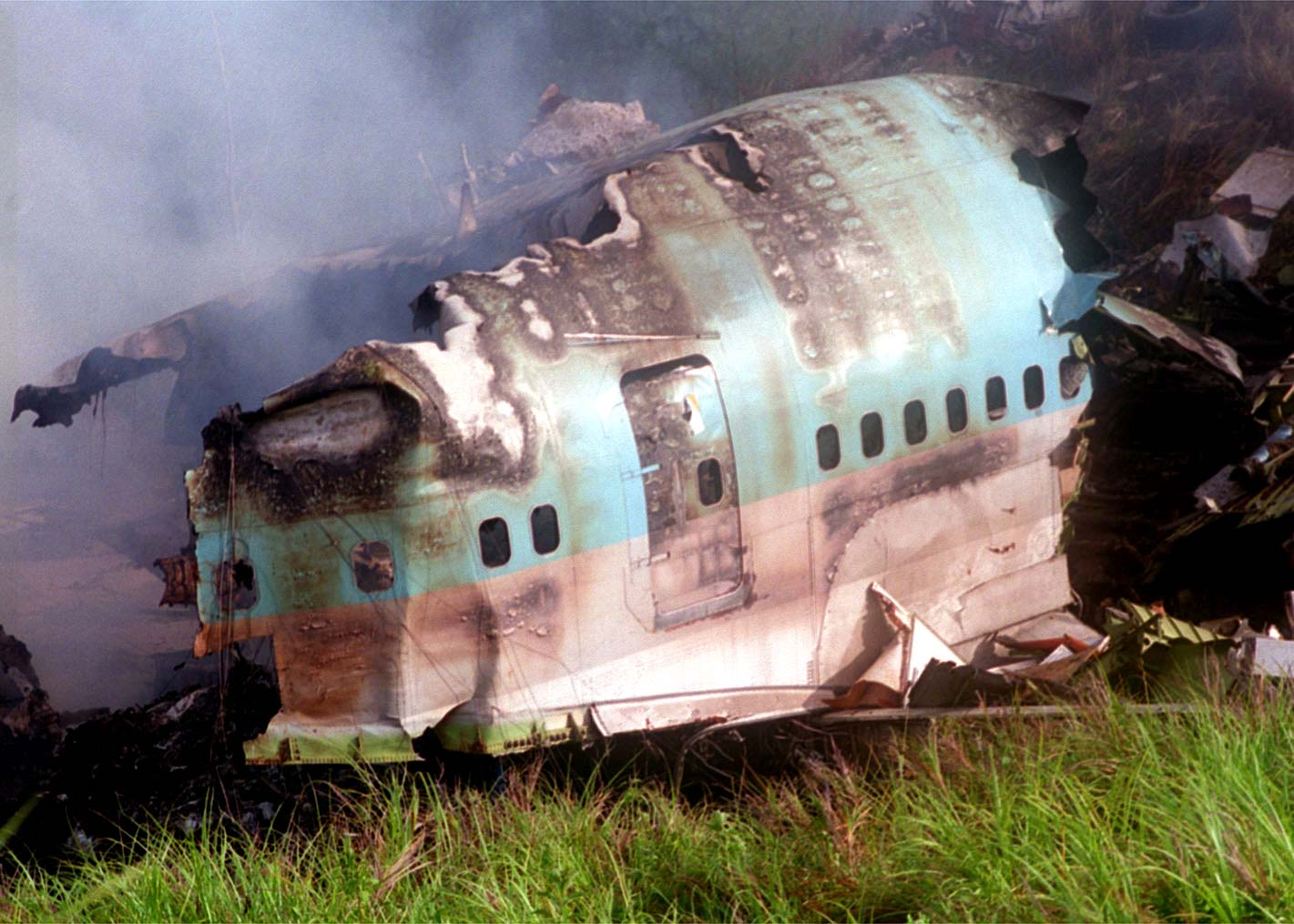
The burnt remains of Korean Air Flight 801

- January 9 – Comair Flight 3272, an Embraer EMB 120 Brasília, crashed near Ida, Michigan, during a snowstorm, killing all 29 on board.
- March 18 – Stavropolskaya Aktsionernaya Avia Flight 1023, an Antonov An-24, broke up in flight and crashed near Cherkessk, Russia; all 50 on board died.
- April 19 – Merpati Nusantara Airlines Flight 106, a BAe ATP, crashed during a failed go-around in bad weather at Buluh Tumbang International Airport, Indonesia; 15 of the 53 passengers and crew were killed.
- May 8 – China Southern Airlines Flight 3456, a Boeing 737, made a hard landing and crashed in Shenzhen, China, during poor weather, killing 35 of the 74 people on board.
- July 9 – A bomb exploded mid-flight on board TAM Transportes Aéreos Regionais Flight 283, a Fokker 100 flying from Vitória tò São Paulo. Of the 60 people on board, one passenger was killed and six were injured.
- July 17 – Sempati Air Flight 304, a Fokker F27, crashed shortly after takeoff from Husein Sastranegara International Airport, Indonesia, killing 28 of the 50 people on board.
- July 30 – Air Littoral Flight 701, an ATR 42 flying from France to Italy, overshot the runway at Florence Airport and crashed into a ditch; all 14 passengers and two of the three crew members survived, but the pilot was killed.
- July 31 – FedEx Express Flight 14, a McDonnell Douglas MD-11, crashed upon landing at Newark Liberty International Airport; the two crew members and three passengers escaped uninjured.
- August 6 – Korean Air Flight 801, a Boeing 747, crashed while attempting to land in heavy rain at Guam International Airport; of the 254 people on board, 229 died.
- August 7 – Fine Air Flight 101, a McDonnell Douglas DC-8-61F, crashed after takeoff at Miami International Airport; all four people on board and one person on the ground were killed.
- August 10 – Formosa Airlines Flight 7601, a Dornier Do 228, crashed while attempting to land at Beigan, Lienchiang, in the Matsu Islands. All 16 passengers and crew were killed.
- September 3 – Vietnam Airlines Flight 815, a Tupolev Tu-134, crashed on approach to Phnom Penh International Airport in heavy rain, killing 65 of the 66 people on board.
- September 6 – Royal Brunei Airlines Flight 238, a Dornier Do 228, crashed into a hillside in Lambir Hills National Park, killing all 10 on board.
- September 8 – Helikopter Service Flight 451, a Eurocopter AS332 Super Puma, crashed en route to the Norne oil field after a mechanical failure. All 12 people on board were killed.
- September 26 – Garuda Indonesia Flight 152, an Airbus A300, crashed on approach in low visibility near Medan, Indonesia, killing all 234 on board.
- October 10 – Austral Líneas Aéreas Flight 2553, a McDonnell Douglas DC-9 en route from Posadas to Buenos Aires, crashed near Fray Bentos, Uruguay, killing all 74 occupants.
- November 5 – Virgin Atlantic Flight 024, an Airbus A340 flying from Los Angeles to London Heathrow, made an emergency landing at Heathrow after its left main landing gear failed to deploy. All 114 on board survived, with seven injured.
- December 9 – Sowind Air Flight 301, an Embraer EMB-110, crashed on approach to Little Grand Rapids, Canada. Four of the 17 people on board were killed.
- December 15 – Tajikistan Airlines Flight 3183, a Tupolev Tu-154, crashed in the desert near Sharjah Airport; of the 86 on board, only the flight engineer survived.
- December 16 – Air Canada Flight 646, a Bombardier CRJ100ER operating a domestic flight in Canada, crashed on landing at Fredericton, New Brunswick, after a failed go-around attempt; all 42 passengers and crew survived.
- December 17 – Aerosvit Flight 241, a Yakovlev Yak-42, crashed near Thessaloniki, Greece, killing all 70 people on board.
- December 19 – SilkAir Flight 185, a Boeing 737, crashed into the Musi River near Palembang, Indonesia, killing all 104 people on board.
- December 22 – A Renan Antonov An-72 disappeared off the coast of Angola, while on a cargo flight from Abidjan, Ivory Coast, to Rundu, Namibia. All 11 on board were presumed dead.
- December 28 – United Airlines Flight 826, a Boeing 747, encountered severe turbulence two hours into the flight; the aircraft returned to Tokyo and landed safely, but one passenger died.

=== 1998 ===
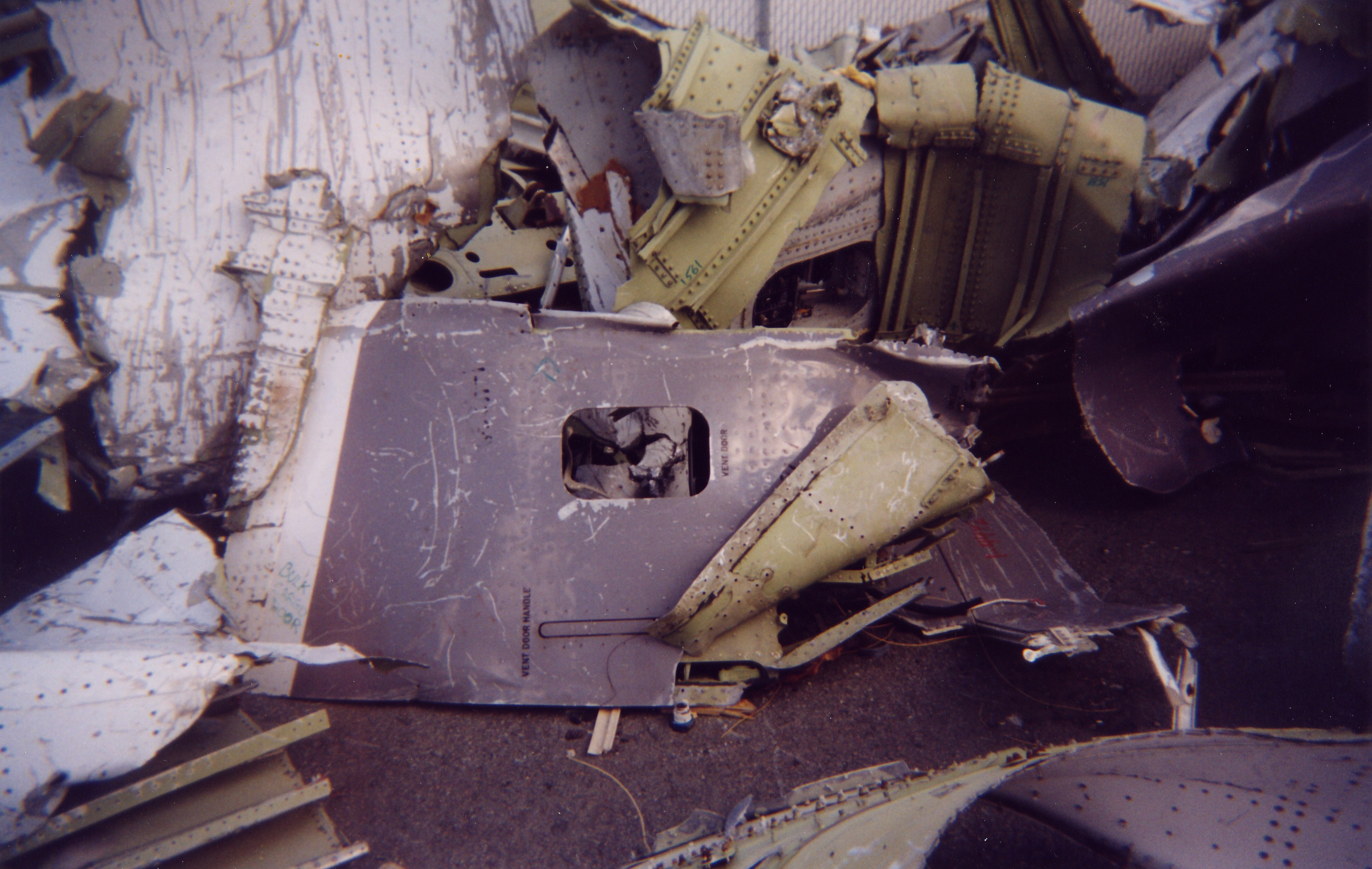
Recovered remains of Swissair Flight 111

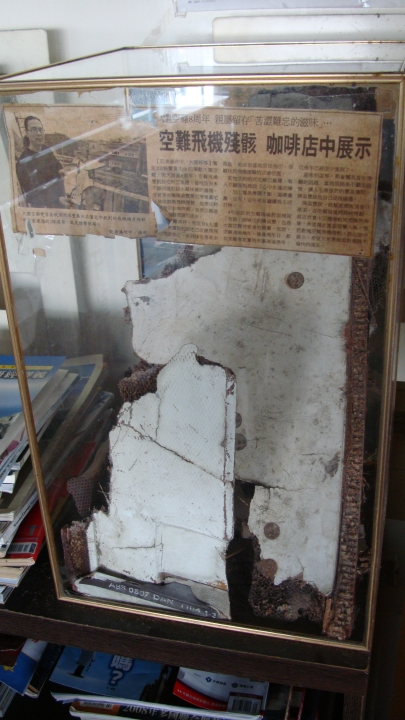
The recovered remains of China Airlines Flight 676 after the crash in 1998

- February 2 – Cebu Pacific Flight 387, a McDonnell Douglas DC-9, crashed into a mountain near Mount Sumagaya in Misamis Oriental in the Philippines, killing all 104 passengers and crew.
- February 16 – China Airlines Flight 676, an Airbus A300, crashed in a residential area while attempting to land in Taipei, Taiwan. All 196 people on board were killed, as well as six on the ground.
- March 18 – Formosa Airlines Flight 7623, a Saab 340, crashed in the ocean off Taiwan shortly after takeoff, following an electrical failure; all 13 on board died.
- March 19 – In the 1998 Ariana Afghan Airlines crash, a Boeing 727 crashed into Sharki Baratayi Mountain while on approach to Kabul International Airport, killing all 45 on board.
- March 22 – Philippine Airlines Flight 137, an Airbus A320, overshot the end of the runway while landing at Bacolod City in the Philippines, plowing through several houses. None of the passengers was harmed, but three people on the ground were killed and several more injured.
- April 20 – Air France Flight 422, a Boeing 727 leased from TAME Airlines, crashed into the mountains east of Bogotá, Colombia, on takeoff from El Dorado International Airport in foggy weather. All 53 passengers and crew died.
- May 5 – In the 1998 Occidental Petroleum Boeing 737 crash, a Boeing 737 leased from the Peruvian Air Force crashed while on approach to Alférez FAP Alfredo Vladimir Sara Bauer Airport, killing 75 of 88 on board.
- May 25 – Pakistan International Airlines Flight 544, a Fokker F-27, was hijacked by three armed men shortly after takeoff. F-16 fighter jets intercepted the plane and forced it to land. The hijackers were arrested and later sentenced to death. All 38 on board survived.
- May 26 – In the 1998 MIAT Mongolian Airlines crash, a Harbin Y-12 crashed 13 minutes after takeoff from Erdenet Airport, Mongolia, killing all 28 passengers and crew.
- June 18 – Propair Flight 420, a Fairchild Metroliner, crashed shortly after takeoff from Dorval Airport (now Montréal–Pierre Elliott Trudeau International Airport), Canada, following an inflight fire. All 11 passengers and crew were killed.
- June 28 – United Airlines Flight 863, a Boeing 747-422 flying from San Francisco to Sydney, suffered an engine failure shortly after takeoff and nearly crashed into San Bruno Mountain. All 307 people on board survived.
- July 30 – Proteus Airlines Flight 706, a Beechcraft 1900D, collided in mid-air with a light aircraft over Quiberon Bay. Both aircraft crashed into the sea, killing all 15 people on board both aircraft.
- July 30 – Indian Airlines Flight 503, a Dornier 228 flying from Agatti to Thiruvananthapuram, with a stopover in Kochi, crashed near Kochi, killing all six people on board and three people on the ground.
- August 5 – Korean Air Flight 8702, a Boeing 747-400 flying from Japan to South Korea, rolled off the runway at Gimpo Airport in Seoul and crashed into a ditch; all 395 passengers and crew survived.
- August 24 – Myanma Airways Flight 635, a Fokker F-27 Friendship, crashed while on approach to Tachilek Airport; all 36 on board died.
- August 29 – Cubana de Aviación Flight 389, a Tupolev Tu-154M, overran the runway whilst taking off from Quito's Mariscal Sucre International Airport, Ecuador, then crashed in a soccer field; 70 of the 91 passengers and crew were killed, along with 10 on the ground.
- September 2 – Swissair Flight 111, a McDonnell Douglas MD-11, crashed into the sea near Halifax, Nova Scotia, Canada, following an onboard fire. All 229 people on board died.
- September 10 – China Eastern Airlines Flight 586, a McDonnell Douglas MD-11, suffered from a landing gear failure, and returned back to Shanghai Hongqiao International Airport with a nose-up landing. All 137 occupants survived the incident.
- September 25 – PauknAir Flight 4101, a BAe 146 flying from Málaga to the Spanish exclave of Melilla in North Africa, crashed in nearby Moroccan territory. All 38 passengers and four crew died.
- September 29 – Lionair Flight 602, an Antonov An-24, was shot down by the Liberation Tigers of Tamil Eelam and crashed off the coast of Jaffna, Sri Lanka, killing all 55 on board.
- October 10 – The 1998 Lignes Aériennes Congolaises crash occurred when rebels using a Strela 2 missile shot down the Boeing 727, which crashed near Kindu, Democratic Republic of Congo, killing all 41 on board.
- December 7 – Air Satellite Flight 501, a Britten-Norman BN2A-26, crashed shortly after takeoff in freezing weather at Baie-Comeau, Quebec, killing 7 of 10 on board.
- December 11 – Thai Airways International Flight 261, an Airbus A310, crashed in poor weather near Surat Thani, Thailand. Of the 146 people on board, 101 were killed.
- December 26 – Transafrik International Flight 806, a Lockheed L-100 Hercules operating for the United Nations, crashed after being shot down by a surface-to-air missile; all 14 people on board were killed.

=== 1999 ===
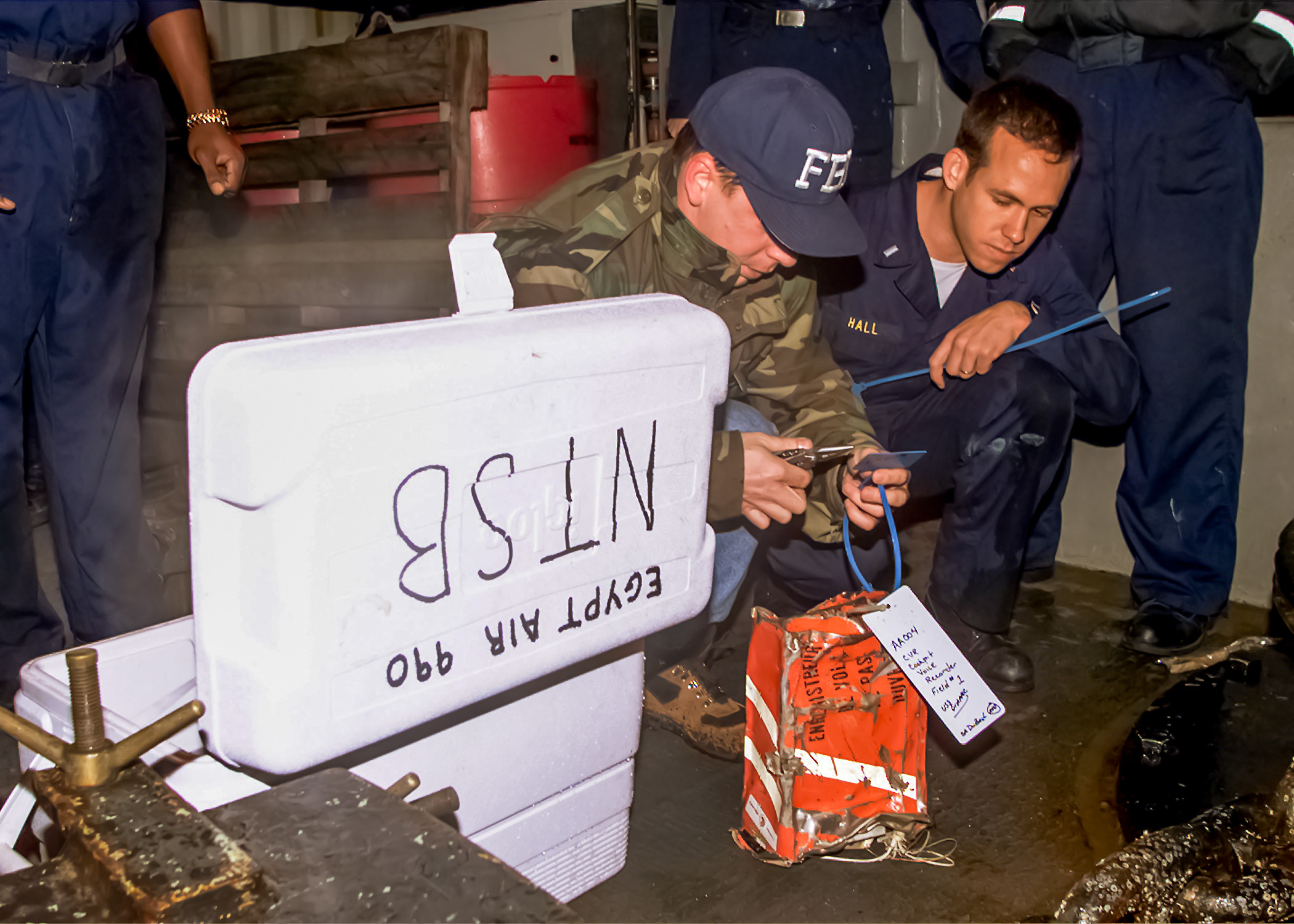
The black boxes of EgyptAir Flight 990

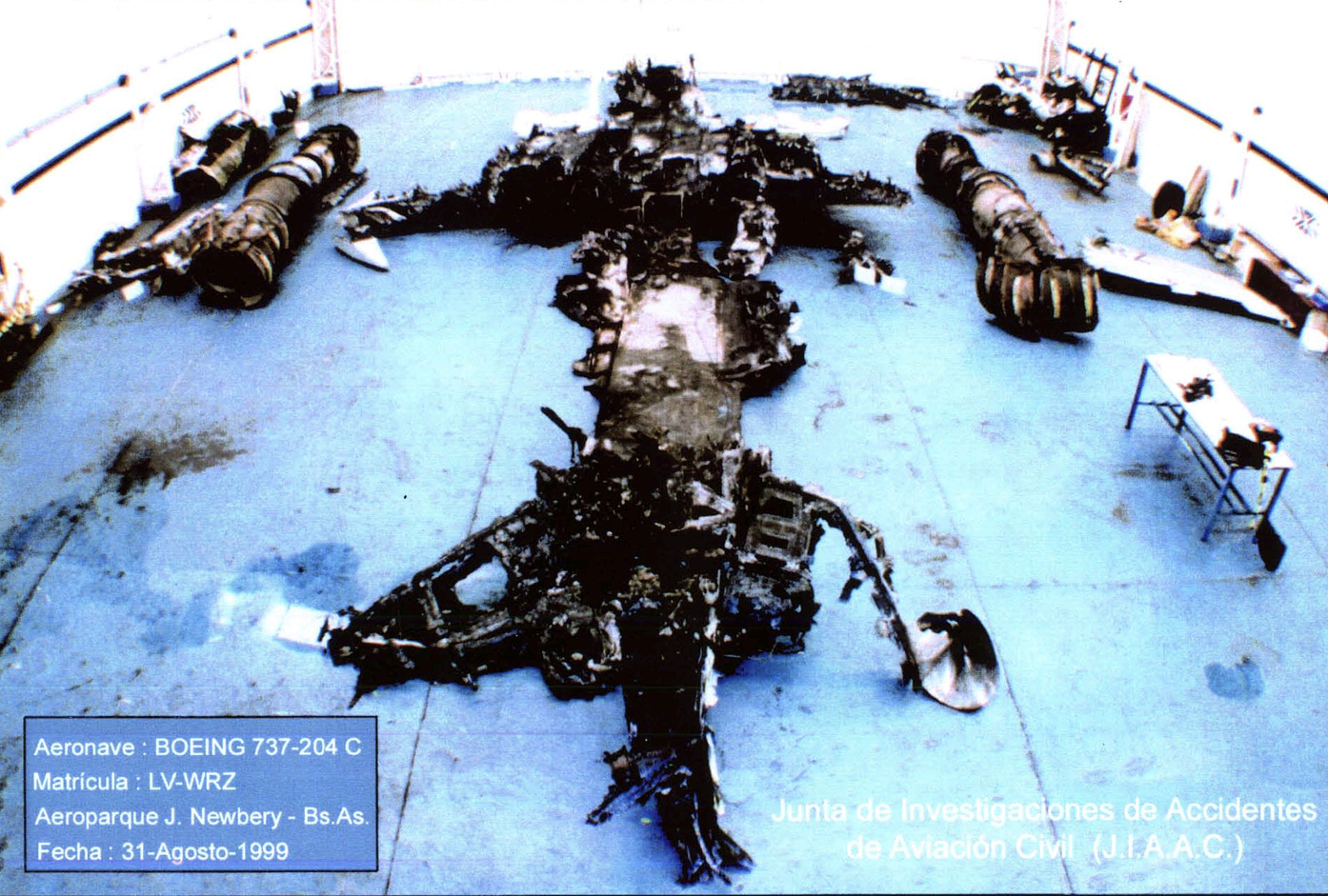
The reassembled crashed flight of LAPA 3142

- February 24 – China Southwest Airlines Flight 4509, a Tupolev Tu-154, crashed while on approach to Wenzhou Airport, killing all 61 passengers and crew.
- February 25 – Alitalia Flight 1553, a Dornier 328, lost control and overran the runway while landing at Genoa Airport in Italy; three passengers and one crew member were killed.
- March 15 – Korean Air Flight 1533, a McDonnell Douglas MD-83 operating a domestic flight in South Korea, overshot the runway on landing in Pohang; all 156 people on board survived but the aircraft was destroyed.
- April 7 – Turkish Airlines Flight 5904, a Boeing 737-400, crashed in poor weather near Hamdilli, Ceyhan, Turkey; all six crew died.
- April 12 – Avianca Flight 9463, a Fokker 50 on a domestic flight in Colombia, was hijacked by ELN guerrillas, who diverted the plane to El Piñal. One day later, all 45 people on board were released uninjured.
- April 15 – Korean Air Cargo Flight 6316, a McDonnell Douglas MD-11F, crashed shortly after takeoff from Shanghai Hongqiao Airport, China. All three crew members were killed, as well as five on the ground.
- June 1 – American Airlines Flight 1420, a McDonnell Douglas MD-82 with 139 passengers on board, skidded off the runway on landing at Little Rock, Arkansas, in high winds and crashed into a steel walkway; 11 people were killed and 86 injured.
- July 7 – Hinduja Cargo Services Flight 8533, a Boeing 727, crashed in the Champadevi Hills after takeoff from Kathmandu. All five crew members were killed.
- July 23 – All Nippon Airways Flight 61, a Boeing 747, was hijacked by a passenger wielding a knife; after fatally stabbing the captain, he was overpowered by the crew, and the first officer landed the plane safely at Haneda, Japan.
- July 24 – Air Fiji Flight 121, an Embraer EMB 110 Bandeirante, crashed into a mountain en route to Nadi International Airport, Fiji. All 17 passengers and crew were killed.
- August 7 – TACV Flight 5002, a Dornier Do 228, crashed into a mountain whilst returning to São Pedro Airport, Cape Verde, in poor weather. All 18 passengers and crew were killed.
- August 22 – China Airlines Flight 642, a McDonnell Douglas MD-11, crashed on landing at Hong Kong International Airport during Typhoon Sam; of the 315 people on board, three died.

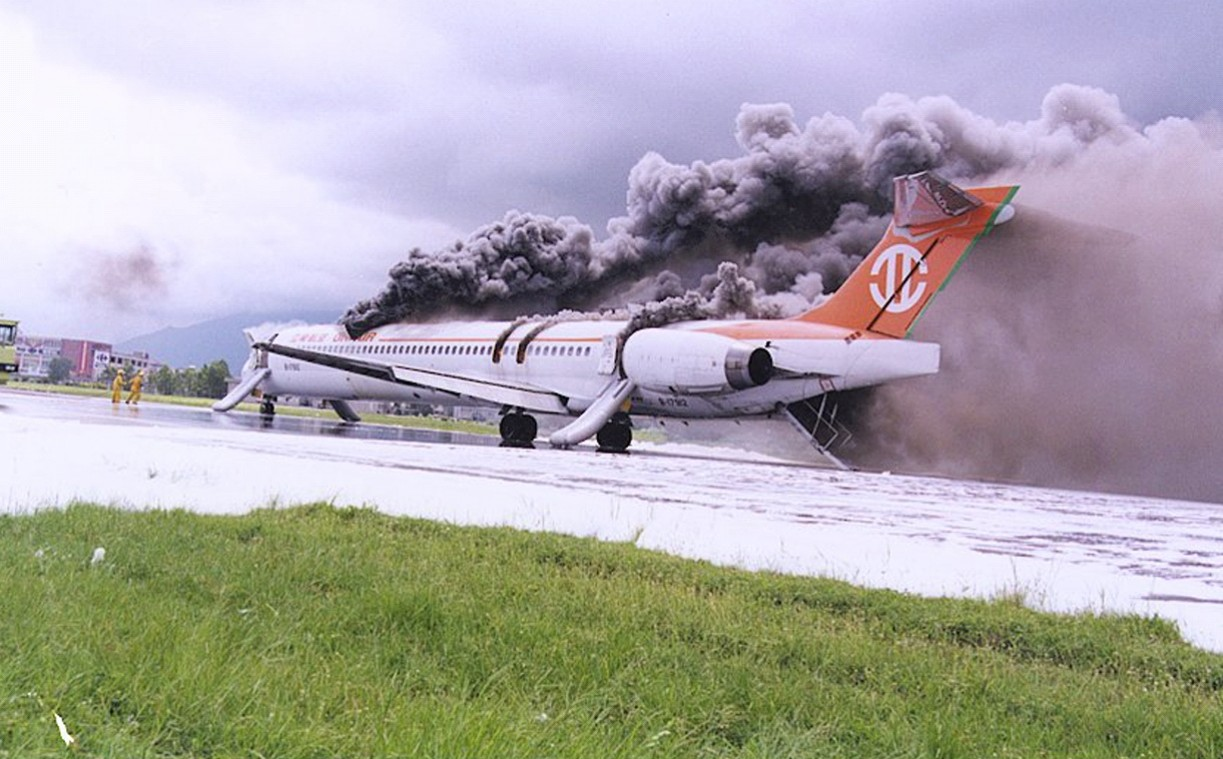
Uni Air Flight 873 burning

- August 24 – Uni Air Flight 873, a McDonnell Douglas MD-90, suffered an explosion and caught fire after landing in Hualien, Taiwan. The incident, caused by hazardous materials being stored in the overhead bins, killed one passenger.
- August 31 – LAPA Flight 3142, a Boeing 737, overshot the runway in Buenos Aires, Argentina, and crashed on a golf course; of the 103 people on board, 63 were killed, as well as two on the ground.
- September 3 – Edinburgh Air Charter Flight 3W, a Cessna 404 Titan, crashed short of the runway after an engine failure during takeoff. The pilot attempted to return to Glasgow Airport but lost control of the plane. The crash killed eight out of 11 occupants.
- September 5 – Necon Air Flight 128, a BAe 748, collided with a telecommunications tower whilst on approach into Kathmandu Airport, Nepal. All 15 passengers and crew were killed.
- September 14 – Britannia Airways Flight 226A, a Boeing 757, veered off the runway at Girona, Spain, while landing in a thunderstorm, and came to rest in a field, broken apart in two places; 43 on board were injured, two seriously, but a passenger initially diagnosed as "lightly injured" died five days later of unnoticed internal injuries.
- September 14 – Olympic Airways Flight 3838, a Dassault Falcon 900B, experience several pitch oscillations, which cause passengers to hit the ceilings. By the end, 7 of the 13 occupants died.
- September 23 – Qantas Flight 1, a Boeing 747, ran off the runway in Bangkok in a storm and came to a complete stop just short of a golf course. All on board survived but 30 passengers were injured.
- October 11 – In the 1999 Air Botswana ATR 42 crash, an Air Botswana pilot stole an ATR 42 and crashed it into two other parked ATR 42s, killing himself and destroying the fleet of Air Botswana.
- October 17 – FedEx Express Flight 087, a McDonnell Douglas MD-11F, crashed after landing at Subic Bay International Airport. Both pilots survived with minor injuries.
- October 31 – EgyptAir Flight 990, a Boeing 767 bound for Cairo, Egypt, crashed into the Atlantic Ocean off Nantucket, Massachusetts, killing all 217 passengers and crew. The cause is disputed: a deliberate act by the relief first officer, according to the NTSB, but a Boeing mechanical flaw, according to Egyptian aviation authorities.
- November 9 – TAESA Flight 725, a McDonnell Douglas DC-9, crashed near Uruapan, Mexico, killing all 18 on board.
- November 12 – Si Fly Flight 3275, an ATR 42-300 operating a UN relief flight, struck a mountain in poor weather whilst on approach into Pristina Airport, Kosovo. All 24 passengers and crew were killed.
- December 7 – Asian Spirit Flight 100, a Let L-410 Turbolet, crashed into a mountain while on approach to Cauayan Airport in the Philippines, killing all 15 passengers and crew.
- December 11 – SATA Air Açores Flight 530M, a BAe ATP, crashed into a mountain during approach into Flores Airport in the Azores. All 35 passengers and crew were killed.
- December 21 – Cubana de Aviación Flight 1216, a McDonnell Douglas DC-10, overran the runway at La Aurora International Airport, killing 16 of 314 people on board and another two on the ground.
- December 22 – Korean Air Cargo Flight 8509, a Boeing 747-200F, crashed near Great Hallingbury, England, after takeoff from Stansted Airport, killing all four crew.
- December 24 – Indian Airlines Flight 814, an Airbus A300, was hijacked en route to Delhi, India; one hostage was killed.
- December 25 – Cubana de Aviación Flight 310, a Yakovlev Yak-42D, crashed into the San Luis Hill near Bejuma, Venezuela, while on approach to Arturo Michelena International Airport; all 22 on board died.

== 2000s ==
=== 2000 ===
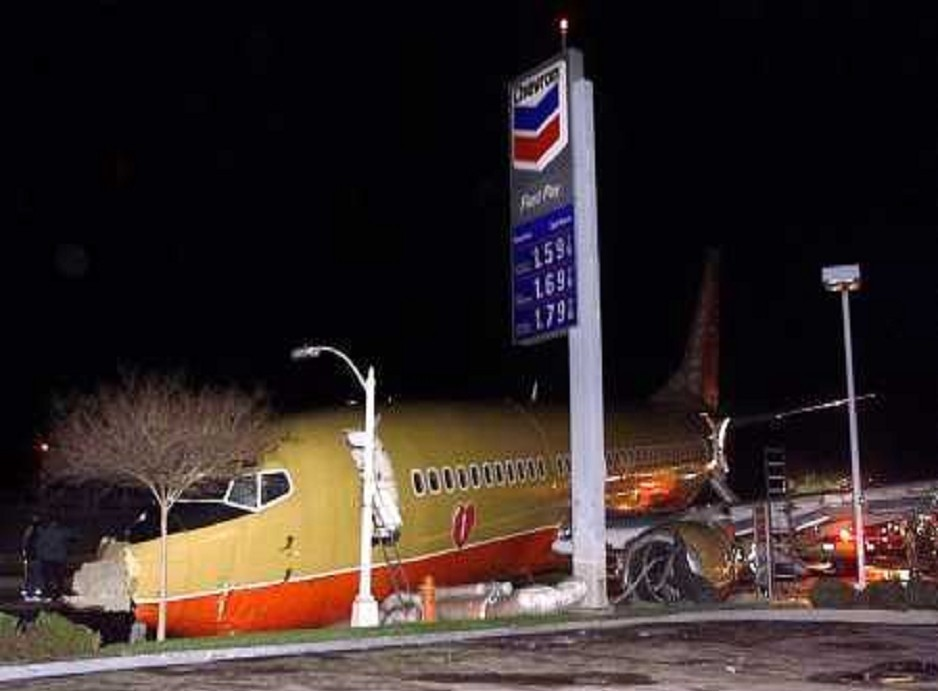
Southwest Airlines Flight 1455 after overrunning the runway.

- January 10 – Crossair Flight 498, a Saab 340, crashed two minutes after takeoff in Niederhasli, Switzerland, killing all 10 people on board.
- January 13 – A Short 360 operated by Avisto ditched in the sea near Marsa Brega, Libya, as a result of ice buildup, killing 22 of the 41 passengers and crew.
- January 30 – Kenya Airways Flight 431, an Airbus A310 carrying 169 passengers and 10 crew members, crashed into the Atlantic Ocean off Côte d'Ivoire after takeoff from Abidjan; only 10 of the 179 people on board survived.
- January 31 – Alaska Airlines Flight 261, an MD-83, crashed into the Pacific Ocean off Point Mugu, California, after experiencing problems with its horizontal stabilizer; all 83 passengers and five crew members were killed.
- February 6 – Ariana Afghan Airlines Flight 805, a Boeing 727-228, was hijacked by 9 people, who forced the crew to divert to Stansted Airport. The hijack ended four days later with no fatalities among the 187 occupants.
- February 16 – Emery Worldwide Airlines Flight 17, a DC-8-71F, crashed into a salvage yard shortly after takeoff from Sacramento Mather Airport, California, killing the three crew members.
- March 5 – Southwest Airlines Flight 1455, a Boeing 737-300, overshot the runway in Burbank, California; 44 of the 142 people on board were injured, two seriously.
- March 9 – Vologda Aviation Enterprise Flight 9651, a Yakovlev Yak-40D, crashed after takeoff from Moscow, killing all 9 occupants.
- April 19 – Air Philippines Flight 541, a Boeing 737-200, crashed in a coconut plantation on Samal Island, Davao del Norte, while preparing to approach Davao International Airport, killing all 131 people on board in one of the deadliest accidents involving the 737-200 and the deadliest in the Philippines.
- May 21 – An Executive Airlines BAe-3101 crashed into a mountainous terrain following an engine failure due to fuel starvation, killing all 19 on board.
- May 25 – Philippine Airlines Flight 812, an Airbus A330-301 operating a domestic flight, experienced an attempted hijacking shortly before landing at Ninoy Aquino International Airport in Manila; all 290 passengers and crew survived the incident, but the hijacker jumped from the aircraft to his death.
- May 25 – Air Liberté Flight 8807, an MD-83 headed to Madrid, collided on the runway at Charles de Gaulle airport with Streamline Aviation Flight 200, a Shorts 330 on a cargo flight to London. All 157 on board the MD-83 survived, while one of the two pilots of the Shorts 330 died.
- May 31 – Whyalla Airlines Flight 904, a Piper PA-31, ditched in the Spencer Gulf in South Australia after both engines failed. All seven passengers and the pilot were killed.
- June 22 – Wuhan Airlines Flight 343, a Xian Y-7, was struck by lightning and crashed in Hanyang District, Wuhan, China, killing all 42 on board and another seven on the ground in the worst ever accident involving the Y-7.
- July 4 – Malév Flight 262, a Tupolev Tu-154, landed on its belly at Thessaloniki International Airport in Greece; there were no serious injuries or fatalities.
- July 8 – Aerocaribe Flight 7831, a British Aerospace Jetstream 32, crashed near Chulum Juárez, Mexico, killing all 19 on board.
- July 12 – Hapag-Lloyd Flight 3378, an Airbus A310, crash-landed 650 metres (2,130 ft) short of the runway in Vienna after running out of fuel; there were no serious injuries or fatalities.
- July 17 – Alliance Air Flight 7412, a Boeing 737-200, crashed into government housing in Patna, India, as it approached the airport, killing 55 of the 58 on board and five people on the ground.
- July 25 – Air France Flight 4590, a Concorde, crashed following takeoff from Paris, France, after striking debris on the runway. All 100 passengers and nine crew were killed, along with four people on the ground; the entire Concorde fleet was grounded for one year.
- July 27 – A Royal Nepal Airlines de Havilland Canada DHC-6 Twin Otter crashed into Jarayakhali Hill in western Nepal, while operating a domestic passenger flight from Bajhang Airport to Dhangadhi Airport. All 25 people on board died.
- August 11 – Southwest Airlines Flight 1763, a Boeing 737-7H4, experienced an air rage incident in which a 19-year-old tried to storm the cockpit before being subdued by six to eight people. The aircraft landed safely; the 19-year-old was killed, and one other person was injured.
- August 23 – Gulf Air Flight 072, an Airbus A320, crashed into the Persian Gulf off Manama, Bahrain, while attempting to land; all 135 passengers and eight crew members were killed.
- October 6 – Aeroméxico Flight 250, a McDonnell Douglas DC-9 arriving from Mexico City, overran the runway and crashed into houses on landing at Reynosa airport. All 88 people on board survived, with 64 injuries. Four people on the ground were killed.
- October 19 – Lao Aviation Flight 703, a Harbin Y-12 on a domestic passenger flight in Laos, crashed into a mountain 12 km from Nathong Airport, killing eight of the 17 people on board.
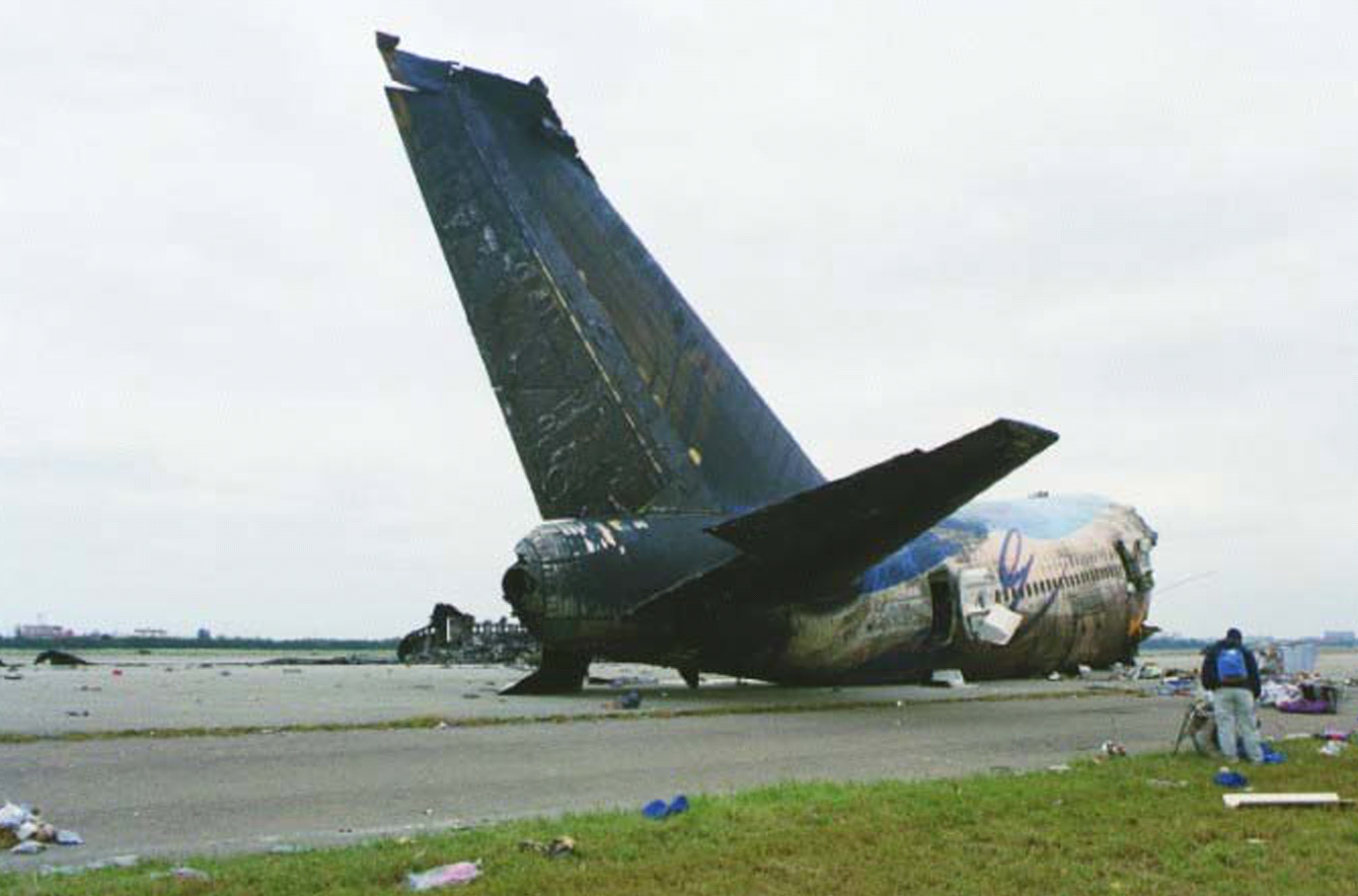
  The remains of Flight 006's tail section at Chiang Kai-shek International Airport
- October 31 – Singapore Airlines Flight 006, a Boeing 747-400, struck construction equipment after using a closed runway for takeoff at Chiang Kai-shek International Airport, Taiwan, killing 83 out of 179 people on board; 96 people survived, with 71 of them injured. This was the first fatal accident involving Singapore Airlines.
- November 15 – An ASA Pesada Antonov An-24RV crashed shortly after takeoff from Quatro de Fevereiro International Airport in Luanda, Angola, after suffering a catastrophic engine failure; all 57 passengers and crew were killed.
- November 18 – Dirgantara Air Service Flight 3130, a Britten Norman BN-2 Islander operating a domestic flight in Indonesia, crashed in a forest on takeoff from Datah Dawai Airport in East Kalimantan, due to overloading and pilot error; all 18 occupants survived but 11 were seriously injured.
- December 4 – Sabena Flight 877, an Airbus A330-223 attempting to land at Bujumbura International Airport, Burundi, was damaged by Hutu rebels firing machine guns; all 170 on board survived but two people were injured.
- December 29 – British Airways Flight 2069, a Boeing 747-436 en route from Gatwick Airport, England, to Nairobi in Kenya, experienced an attempted hijacking by a mentally ill passenger who stormed the cockpit at 35,000 feet (11 km) and sent the aircraft into a nosedive; the flight crew rescued the situation and none of the 398 people on board was seriously injured.

=== 2001 ===
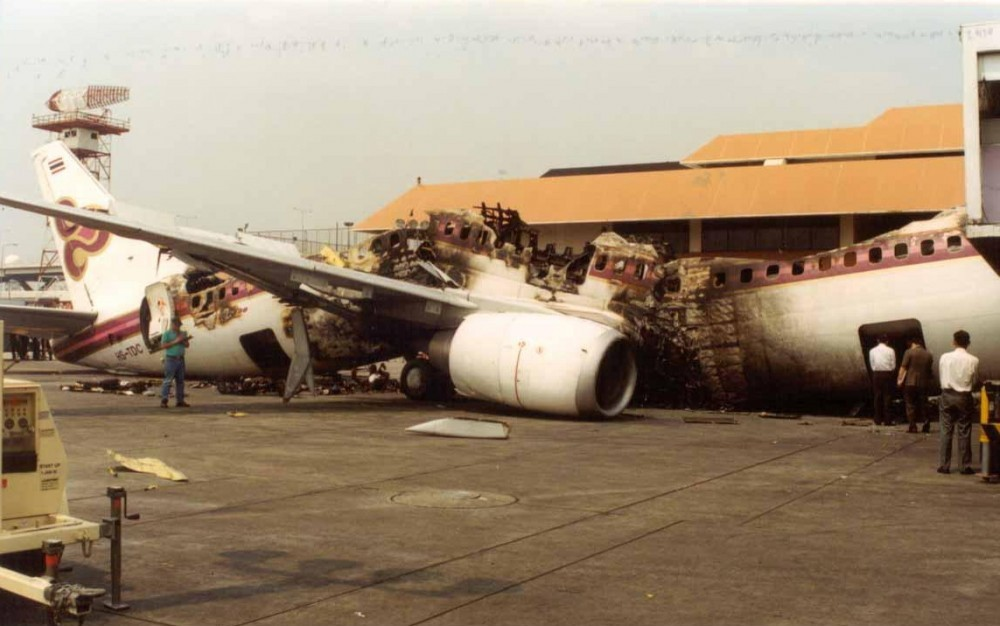
The burnt-out wreckage of Thai Airways International Flight 114

- January 23 – Yemenia Flight 448, a Boeing 727, was hijacked 15 minutes after takeoff from Sana'a International Airport, Yemen; the crew made an emergency landing at Djibouti; the hijacker was subdued, with no casualties among the 91 passengers or 10 crew members.
- January 25 – RUTACA Airlines Flight 225, a Douglas DC-3, crashed shortly after takeoff from Tomás de Heres Airport, Venezuela, as a result of an engine failure; all 24 passengers and crew were killed, plus one person on the ground.
- January 31 – In the 2001 Japan Airlines mid-air incident, Japan Airlines Flight 907, a Douglas DC-10, and Japan Airlines Flight 958, a Boeing 747, narrowly avoided colliding by a margin of 36 feet (11 metres) near Yaizu, Japan.
- February 7 – Iberia Flight 1456, an Airbus A320-200, crash-landed near Bilbao airport due to a microburst and subsequent landing-gear collapse. All 143 on board survived, with 25 injured.
- February 27 – Loganair Flight 670A, a Short 360 operating a postal flight, crashed shortly after takeoff from Edinburgh Airport, Scotland, as a result of a double engine failure; both crew members were killed.
- March 3 – Thai Airways International Flight 114, a Boeing 737-400, was destroyed by an explosion at gate 62 of Don Mueang Airport, Thailand, prior to boarding; one flight attendant was killed.
- March 15 – Vnukovo Airlines Flight 2806, a Tupolev Tu-154 flying from Istanbul to Moscow, was hijacked by Chechen terrorists and diverted to Medina. During the hijacking three of the 171 people on board were killed.
- March 24 – Air Caraïbes Flight 1501, a DHC-6 Twin Otter, crashed into a house whilst on approach into Saint Barthélemy Airport, Guadeloupe; all 19 passengers and crew, as well as one person on the ground, were killed.
- May 17 – In the 2001 Faraz Qeshm Airlines Yak-40 crash, a Yakovlev Yak-40 crashed into mountains en route to Gorgan Airport, Iran, in poor weather conditions; all 30 passengers and crew were killed, including Iran's Minister of Roads and Transportation, Rahman Dadman.
- July 4 – Vladivostok Air Flight 352, a Tupolev Tu-154, entered a flat spin on approach to Irkutsk Airport in Irkutsk, Russia, then crashed and burst into flames in a wooded area, killing all 145 on board.
- July 14 – Rus Flight 9633, an Ilyushin Il-76TD, crashed on takeoff from Chkalovsky Air Base, Moscow Oblast, Russia. The cause was attributed to aircraft overloading and takeoff configuration. All 10 people on board were killed.
- August 24 – Air Transat Flight 236, an Airbus A330, made an emergency landing in the Azores after running out of fuel over the Atlantic Ocean; some tires blew out upon landing, causing a fire that was extinguished by emergency personnel on the ground; none of the 293 passengers or 13 crew on board the aircraft was seriously injured.
- August 29 – Binter Mediterráneo Flight 8261, a CASA CN-235, suffered port engine failure and crashed onto the N-340 road while attempting to make an emergency landing at Ruiz Picasso International Airport in Spain, killing four of 43 on board; the pilot initially survived but died several hours later.
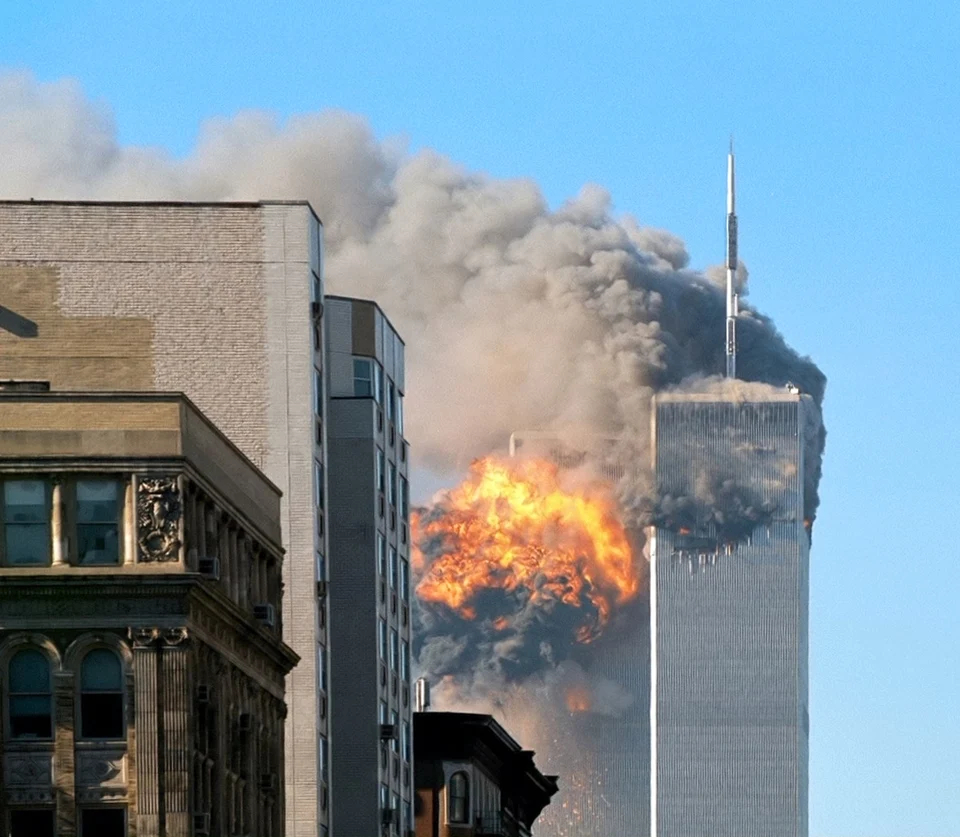
  United Airlines Flight 175 crashed into South Tower of World Trade Center in New York City as part of September 11 attacks.
- September 11 attacks:
  - American Airlines Flight 11, a Boeing 767-200ER with 92 people on board, was hijacked after taking off from Boston, and was flown into the north tower of the World Trade Center in New York City; all on board were killed, as well as around 1600 people on the ground and in the building.
  - United Airlines Flight 175, a Boeing 767-200 with 65 people on board, was hijacked after taking off from Boston, and was flown into the south tower of the World Trade Center in New York City; all on board were killed, as well as around 900 people on the ground and in the building; the collapse of both towers brought the total death toll from the two crashes to at least 2,763, the deadliest disaster involving commercial aircraft.
  - American Airlines Flight 77, a Boeing 757-200 with 64 people on board, was hijacked after taking off from Dulles International Airport, and was flown into the Pentagon; all on board were killed, as well as 125 people in the building and on the ground.
  - United Airlines Flight 93, a Boeing 757-200 with 44 people on board, was hijacked after taking off from Newark, New Jersey; passengers struggled with the hijackers, and the aircraft crashed in a field near Shanksville, Pennsylvania, killing all on board. The passengers on board are honored at the crash site for their heroic and courageous decisions to fight back against the hijackers, preventing the Boeing 757 from striking its intended target (likely the Capitol of the United States).
  - Korean Air Flight 085, a Boeing 747-4B5, received information about the September 11 attacks. In a false alarm, the plane later sent a distress signal indicating that the plane had been hijacked.
  - Delta Air Lines Flight 1989, a Boeing 767-332ER on a scheduled flight from Logan International Airport to Los Angeles International Airport, experienced a suspected hijacking but safely landed at Cleveland Hopkins International Airport.
- September 15 – TAM Airlines Flight 9755, a Fokker 100 operating a domestic flight in Brazil, suffered an uncontained engine failure near Belo Horizonte. Debris shattered three windows, causing decompression of the aircraft; one passenger was partially blown out of the cabin and later died, but the other 87 passengers and crew survived.
- September 21 – Aeroflot Flight 521, an Ilyushin Il-86 arriving from Moscow, performed a belly landing at Dubai International Airport. All 322 people on board survived.
- October 4 – Siberia Airlines Flight 1812, a Tupolev Tu-154, was shot down by the Ukrainian military over the Black Sea; all 66 passengers and 12 crew members were killed.
- October 8 – In the 2001 Linate Airport runway collision, Scandinavian Airlines System Flight 686, an MD-87, crashed into a Cessna business jet on takeoff from Milan, Italy, then swerved into a baggage handling building and caught fire; all 110 people on board the MD-87 and all four in the Cessna were killed, as well as four people on the ground.

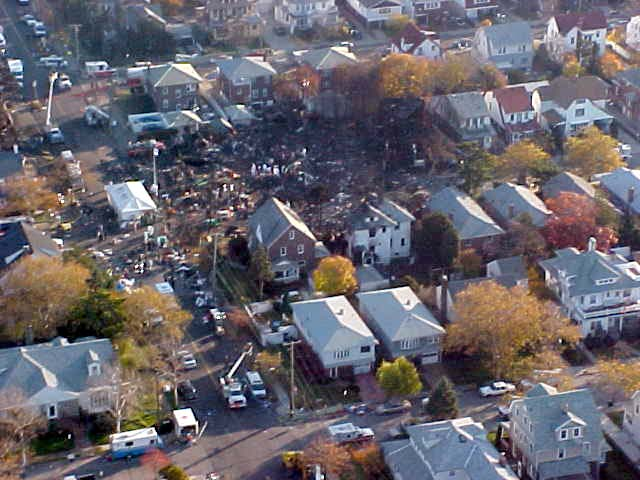
Aerial view of the neighbourhood in Queens, New York, where American Airlines Flight 587 crashed.

- October 10 – Flightline Flight 101, a Fairchild Swearingen Metroliner, crashed into the Mediterranean Sea near the Columbretes Islands after a lightning strike, killing all 10 on board.
- November 12 – American Airlines Flight 587, an Airbus A300, crashed into a Queens neighbourhood in New York City when the plane's vertical tail fin snapped off just after takeoff, due to overuse of the rudder by the first officer during a wake turbulence encounter. All 251 passengers and nine crew members were killed, as well as five people on the ground.
- November 19 – IRS Aero Flight 9601/02, an Ilyushin Il-18 on a charter flight, crashed near Kalyazin, Russia, after a technical failure. All 27 people on board were killed.
- November 23 – ELK Airways Flight 1007, an Antonov An-28 arriving from Tallinn, crashed on approach to Kärdla, Estonia. Two of the 17 people on board were killed.
- November 24 – Crossair Flight 3597, an Avro RJ100, crashed near Bassersdorf, Switzerland, while attempting to land in Zürich; 24 of the 33 people on board died.
- December 22 – On board American Airlines Flight 63, a Boeing 767, a passenger, Richard Reid, attempted to detonate explosives hidden in his shoes, but failed and was subdued by two flight attendants and passengers; the aircraft landed safely in Boston.
- December 26 – A Bremerhaven Airline Britten-Norman Islander, headed to Wangerooge, Germany, stalled and crashed into a river shortly after take off from Bremerhaven. Eight of the nine people on board were killed.

=== 2002 ===
- January 14 – Siberia Airlines Flight 852, a Tupolev Tu-204 made a belly landing at Novosibirsk and overran the runway. All 139 people on board survived.
- January 16 – Garuda Indonesia Flight 421, a Boeing 737-300, was forced to ditch in Solo River in Indonesia. One flight attendant was killed, but the remaining 59 people on board survived.
- January 28 – TAME Flight 120, a Boeing 727, crashed into a volcano on approach to Tulcán, Ecuador, in low-visibility conditions; all 94 on board were killed.
- February 12 – Iran Air Tours Flight 956, a Tupolev Tu-154, crashed in the Sefid Kooh mountains during heavy rain, snow and dense fog, while descending to Khorramabad Airport; all 12 crew members and 107 passengers were killed.
- April 15 – Air China Flight 129, a Boeing 767-200ER, crashed into a hill during a landing attempt at Busan, South Korea, in misty conditions; of the 155 passengers and 11 crew, 37 survived.
- May 4 – EAS Airlines Flight 4226, a BAC 1-11 525FT, crashed in the Gwammaja neighbourhood in Kano, Nigeria, shortly after takeoff, killing 73 of the 77 on board, and at least 30 people on the ground.
- May 7 – EgyptAir Flight 843, a Boeing 737-566, crashed near Tunis, Tunisia, while landing in rough weather; of the 62 people on board, 14 died.
- May 7 – China Northern Airlines Flight 6136, a McDonnell Douglas MD-82, crashed near Dalian, China, after a passenger set fire to the cabin with gasoline; all 103 passengers and nine crew were killed.
- May 25 – China Airlines Flight 611, a Boeing 747-200B, disintegrated in mid-flight above the Taiwan Strait, due to maintenance error, killing all 225 people on board.

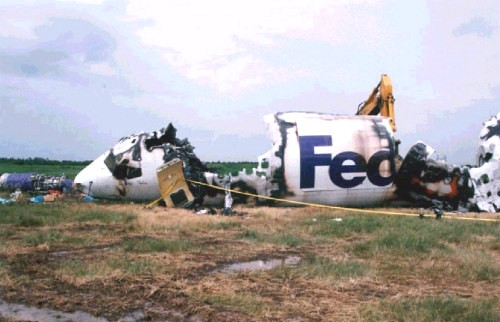
Wreckage of FedEx Express Flight 1478

- July 1 – In the Überlingen mid-air collision, Bashkirian Airlines Flight 2937, a Tupolev Tu-154 with 60 passengers and nine crew members on board, collided with DHL Flight 611, a Boeing 757 freighter with two pilots on board, near Lake Constance, Germany; all 71 people on both planes died, including around 40 school children on Flight 2937.
- July 4 – In the 2002 Prestige Airlines Boeing 707 crash, a Boeing 707 crashed at Bangui Airport in the Central African Republic while attempting an emergency landing, killing 28 of 30 on board.
- July 10 – Swiss International Air Lines Flight 850, a Saab 2000, hit an earth bank after landing at Werneuchen Airfield, Germany, after multiple diversions due to a storm system; all 20 on board survived the accident but the aircraft was written off.
- July 16 – In the 2002 Bristow Helicopters Sikorsky S-76A crash, a Sikorsky S-76 helicopter carrying oil workers between platforms crashed into the North Sea northeast of Cromer, United Kingdom, killing all 11 on board.
- July 26 – FedEx Express Flight 1478, a Boeing 727, crashed during landing at Tallahassee International Airport, Florida; all three crew members survived but the aircraft was written off.
- July 28 – Pulkovo Aviation Enterprise Flight 9560, an Ilyushin Il-86 on a re-positioning flight, crashed after takeoff from Sheremetyevo International Airport in Moscow, Russia, killing 14 of the 16 crew members.
- August 22 – In the 2002 Shangri-La Air Twin Otter crash, a DHC-6 Twin Otter crashed in thick cloud whilst on approach into Pokhara Airport, Nepal, killing all 18 passengers and crew.
- August 30 – Rico Linhas Aéreas Flight 4823, an Embraer EMB 120 Brasília, crashed on approach to Rio Branco International Airport, Brazil, in a rainstorm; the aircraft broke up into three pieces and caught fire; 23 of the 31 on board died.
- September 14 – Total Linhas Aéreas Flight 5561, an ATR 42, crashed near Paranapanema, São Paulo, Brazil, due to a pitch trim control system failure, killing both pilots.
- October 9 – Northwest Airlines Flight 85, a Boeing 747, experienced a rudder hardover; the crew made an emergency landing at Ted Stevens Anchorage International Airport and all 404 people on board were unharmed.
- November 6 – Luxair Flight 9642, a Fokker F50, crashed short of the runway on approach to Luxembourg Findel Airport in foggy weather conditions; of the 19 passengers and three crew, only two survived.
- November 11 – Laoag International Airlines Flight 585, a Fokker F-27 Friendship, crashed into Manila Bay shortly after takeoff from Ninoy Aquino International Airport in the Philippines; of the 34 people on board, 19 were killed.
- November 28 – Terrorists fired two Strela 2 surface-to-air missiles at Arkia Flight 582, a chartered Boeing 757-300, as it took off from Mombasa, Kenya. The missiles did not hit the aircraft and all 271 on board were uninjured.
- December 21 – TransAsia Airways Flight 791, an ATR 72-200 operating a cargo flight from Taipei to Macau, crashed into the sea near Penghu, Taiwan, killing both pilots.
- December 23 – Aeromist-Kharkiv Flight 2137, an Antonov An-140, crashed near Ardestan in Iran whilst descending into Isfahan International Airport, killing all 44 on board; the accident was found to have been caused by insufficient crew training.

=== 2003 ===
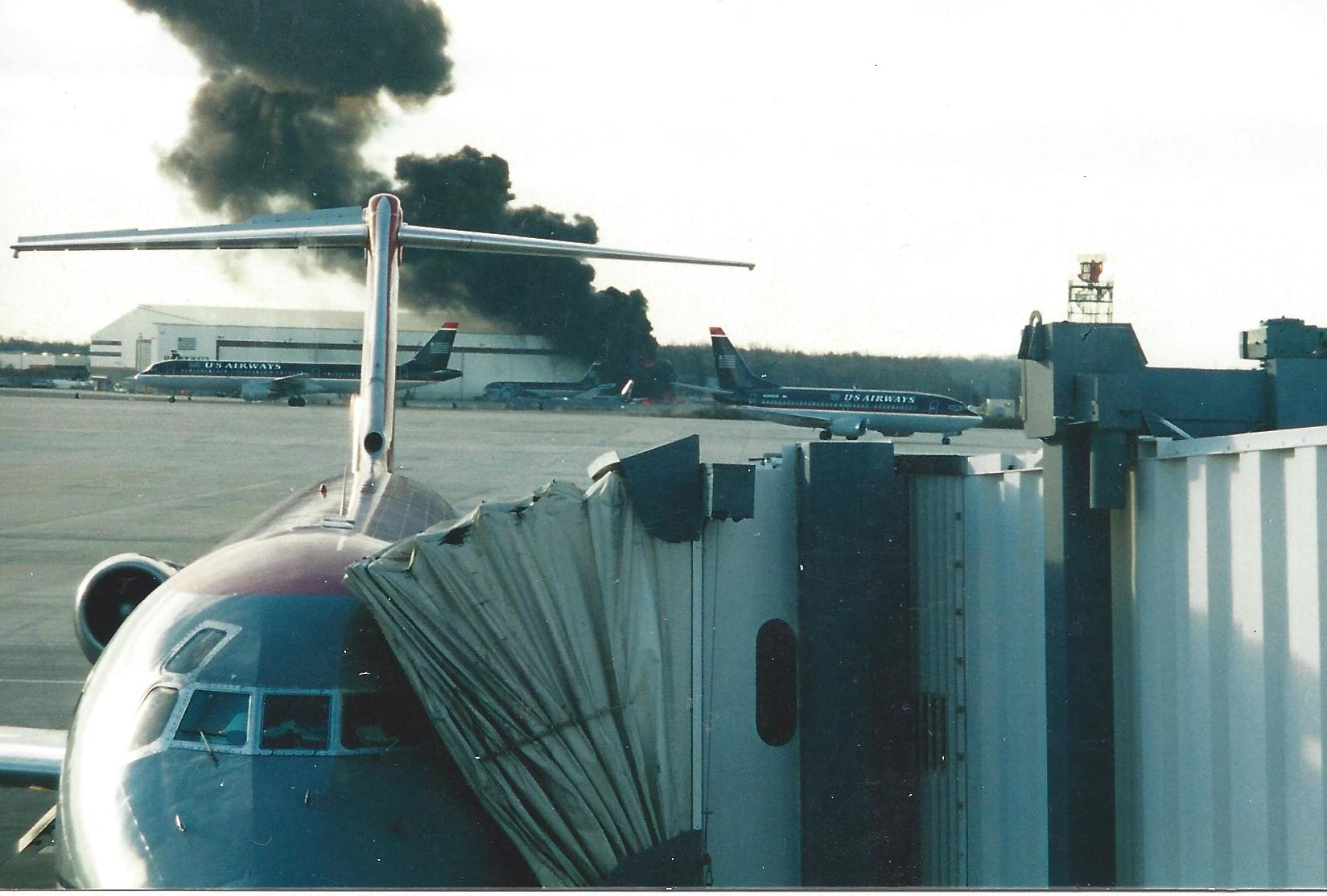
Smoke rising from a warehouse seconds after the crash of Air Midwest Flight 5481.

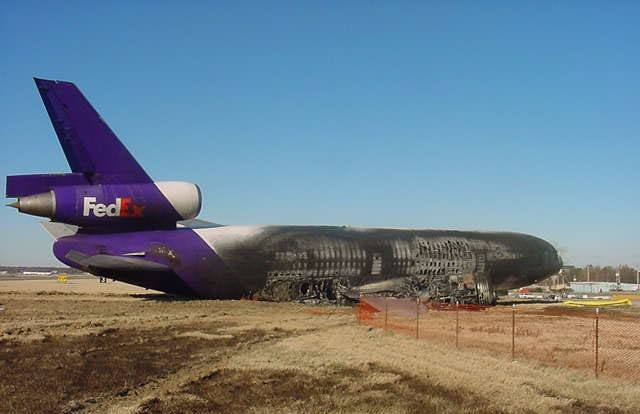
FedEx Express Flight 647

- January 8 – Air Midwest Flight 5481, a Beechcraft 1900, crashed on takeoff from Charlotte, North Carolina, United States; all 19 passengers and two pilots were killed.
- January 8 – Turkish Airlines Flight 634, an Avro RJ100, crashed in thick fog during its final approach to Diyarbakır Airport, Turkey; five crew members and 70 passengers were killed, while five passengers survived with serious injuries.
- January 9 – TANS Perú Flight 222, a Fokker F28, crashed while on approach to Chachapoyas Airport; all 46 on board died.
- March 6 – Air Algérie Flight 6289, a Boeing 737-200, veered off the runway on takeoff in Tamanrasset, Algeria; 96 of the 97 passengers and all six crew members died.
- March 15 – During the SARS epidemic, 22 people on board Air China Flight 112 contracted SARS. Five of the affected people died later from the disease.
- May 8 – In the 2003 Congo air disaster, a Ukrainian Cargo Airways Ilyushin Il-76 on a government charter flight suffered a rapid decompression after a cargo door opened in mid-flight. The aircraft managed to return to Kinshasa, but not before between 17 and 200 passengers were sucked out to their deaths (casualty numbers vary depending on source).
- May 25 – A Boeing 727-200 was stolen from Quatro de Fevereiro Airport in Angola, possibly by two men known to the authorities, and the plane disappeared over the Atlantic Ocean; despite an extensive search effort, the aircraft has never been found.
- May 26 – UM Airlines Flight 4230, a Yakovlev Yak-42, crashed into the side of a mountain near the town of Maçka, Turkey. All 75 people on board were killed.
- May 29 – A man attempted to hijack Qantas Flight 1737, a Boeing 717, in Melbourne, Australia, intending to crash the plane in Tasmania. He was overpowered by the flight crew and passengers, but three people were injured.
- June 22 – Air France Flight 5672, a Bombardier CRJ100ER operating a domestic flight from Nantes to Brest, crashed on approach to Brest-Guipavas Airport, due to pilot error, killing one of the 24 people on board.
- July 8 – Sudan Airways Flight 139, a Boeing 737-200, crashed shortly after taking off from Port Sudan, Sudan, killing 116 of the 117 people on board; a two-year-old boy was the sole survivor.
- August 24 – Tropical Airways Flight 1301, a Let L-410 Turbolet operating a domestic flight in Haiti, crashed in a field shortly after taking off from Cap-Haïtien International Airport, due to a cargo door failure; all 21 people on board were killed.
- August 26 – Colgan Air Flight 9446, a Beech 1900D, crashed into the sea just after taking off from Barnstable Municipal Airport, Massachusetts. Both pilots were killed.
- September 11 - Wasaya Airways Flight 125, a C208 crashed near Nibinamik First Nations, Canada, killing the eight onboard
- November 22 – A DHL Airbus A300 was hit by a missile near Baghdad, Iraq, and lost hydraulic system function, but managed to land safely without any fatalities using only engine controls. This was the first non-fatal landing of an airliner without control surfaces.
- December 18 – FedEx Express Flight 647, a McDonnell Douglas MD-10-10, veered off the runway and caught fire upon landing at Memphis International Airport, after a landing gear collapse; the two crew members and five passengers escaped with only minor injuries.
- December 25 – UTA Flight 141, a Boeing 727, ran off the end of the runway upon takeoff at Cotonou, Benin, and crashed onto the beach on the Bight of Benin, killing 141 of the 160 occupants.

=== 2004 ===
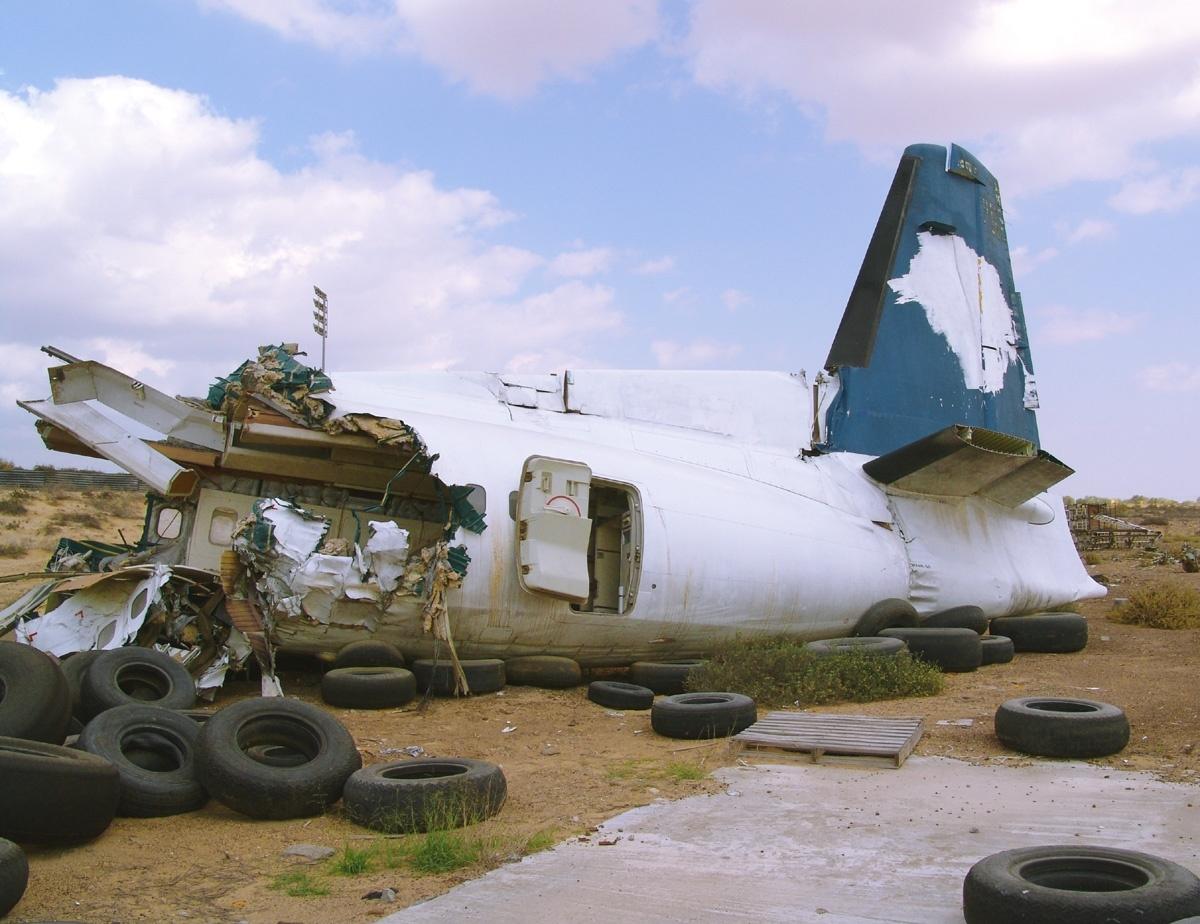
The wreckage of Kish Air Flight 7170

- January 3 – Flash Airlines Flight 604, a Boeing 737-300, crashed into the Red Sea, killing all 135 passengers and 13 crew members in the worst ever accident involving the 737-300.
- January 13 – Uzbekistan Airways Flight 1154, a Yakovlev Yak-40, collided with a radar station on approach into Tashkent International Airport, Uzbekistan, in poor weather. All 37 passengers and crew were killed.
- January 17 – Georgian Express Flight 126, a Cessna 208B Grand Caravan, crashed shortly after takeoff from Pelee, Ontario, Canada, due to icing and overweight, killing all nine passengers and one pilot.
- February 10 – Kish Air Flight 7170, a Fokker 50, crashed at Sharjah International Airport, United Arab Emirates, killing 43 people. Three survived with serious injuries.
- May 14 – Rico Linhas Aéreas Flight 4815, an Embraer 120ER, crashed while on approach to Eduardo Gomes International Airport, killing all 33 passengers and crew; the cause was never determined.
- June 8 – Gabon Express Flight 221, a Hawker Siddeley HS 748, crashed into the sea after attempting an emergency landing at Libreville International Airport, Gabon, after an engine failure; 19 of the 30 passengers and crew were killed.
- August 13 – Air Tahoma Flight 185, a Convair 580, crashed near Covington, Kentucky, while descending to land, killing the first officer.
- 2004 Russian aircraft bombings:
  - Siberia Airlines Flight 1047, a Tupolev Tu-154, exploded in mid-air while flying over Rostov Oblast, Russia, killing all 38 passengers and eight crew members.
  - Volga-AviaExpress Flight 1303, a Tupolev Tu-134, exploded in mid-air while flying over Tula Oblast, Russia, killing all 35 passengers and nine crew members.

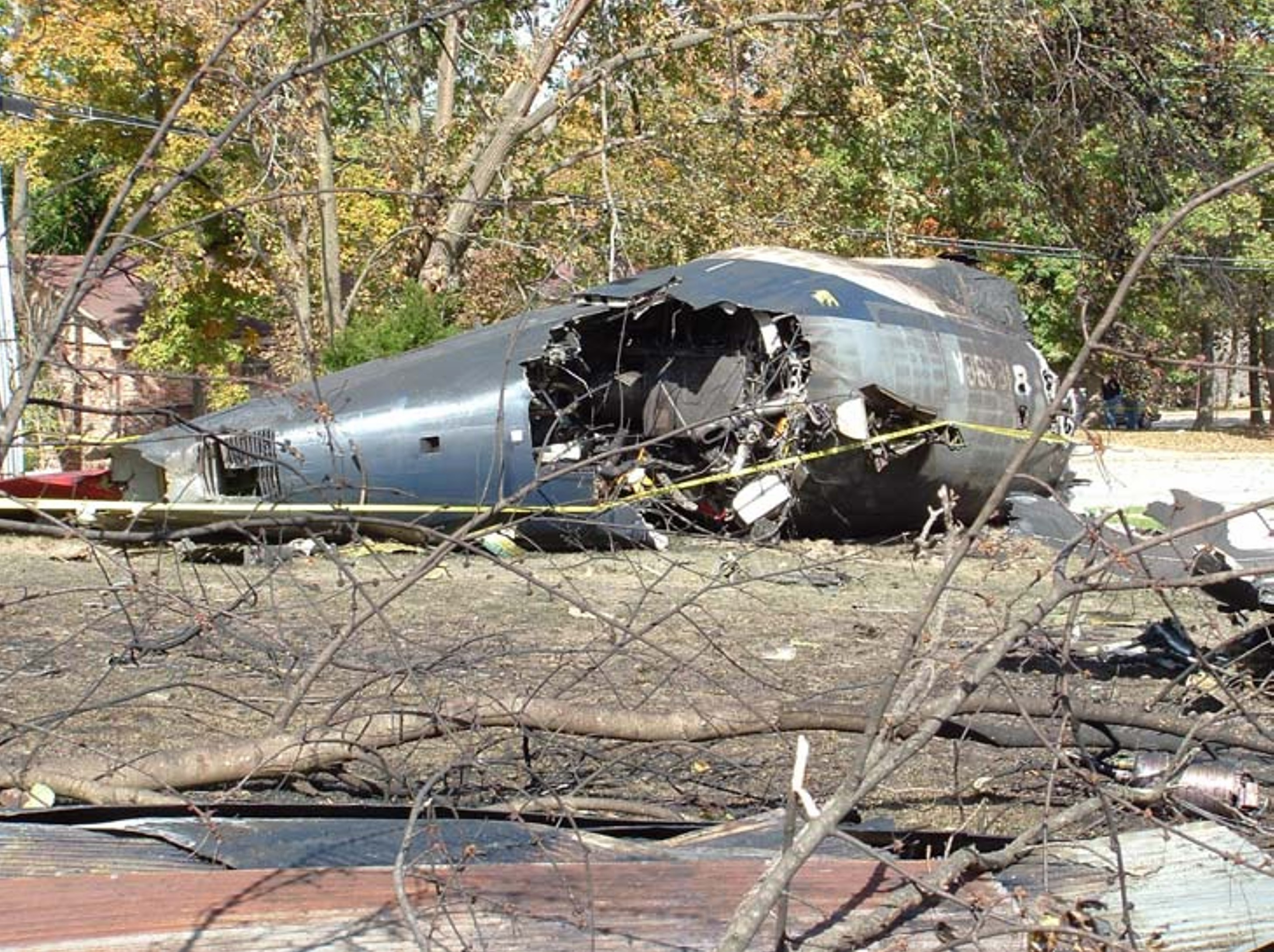
The aft fuselage of Pinnacle Airlines Flight 3701

- October 14 – MK Airlines Flight 1602, a Boeing 747-200F, crashed on takeoff from Halifax Stanfield International Airport in Nova Scotia, Canada, killing all seven on board.
- October 14 – Pinnacle Airlines Flight 3701, a CRJ-200 on a repositioning flight with no passengers, crashed near Jefferson City, Missouri, killing both pilots.
- October 19 – Corporate Airlines Flight 5966, a British Aerospace Jetstream, crashed near Kirksville, Missouri, United States; 13 of the 15 people on board died.
- November 21 – China Eastern Airlines Flight 5210, a Bombardier CRJ200, stalled and crashed near Baotou, China, shortly after takeoff, because of frost contamination; all 53 on board and two people on the ground were killed. This is the deadliest crash involving a Bombardier CRJ200.
- November 30 – Lion Air Flight 538, a McDonnell Douglas MD-82, crash-landed in Solo City, Indonesia, killing 25 of the 163 people on board.

=== 2005 ===
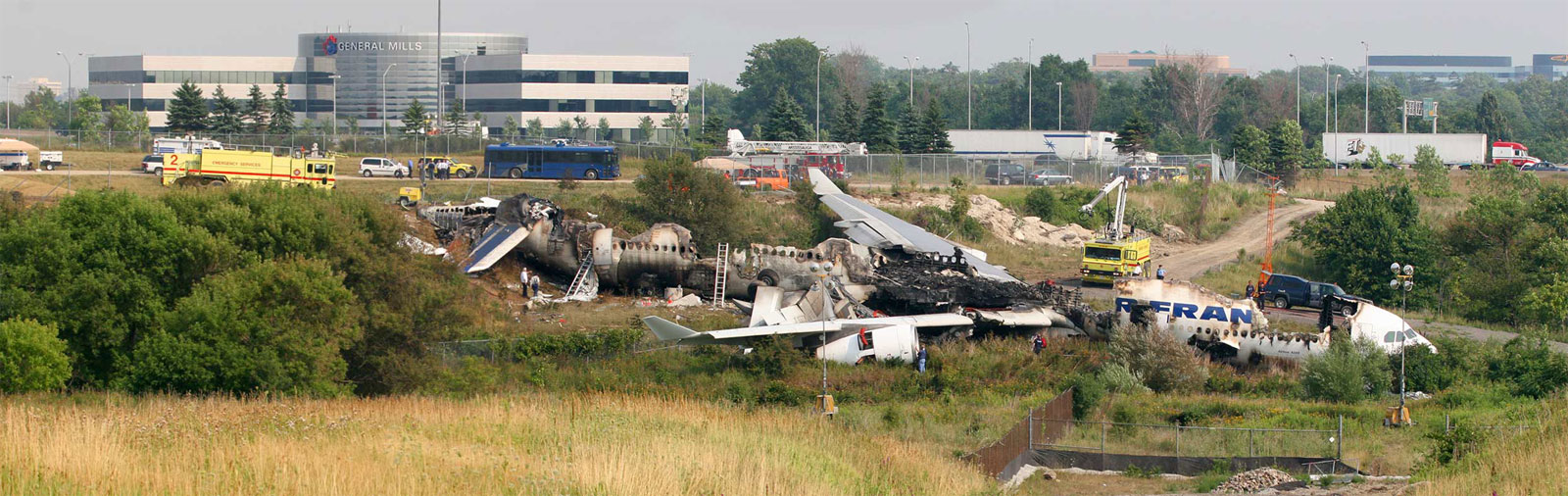
The wreckage of Air France Flight 358

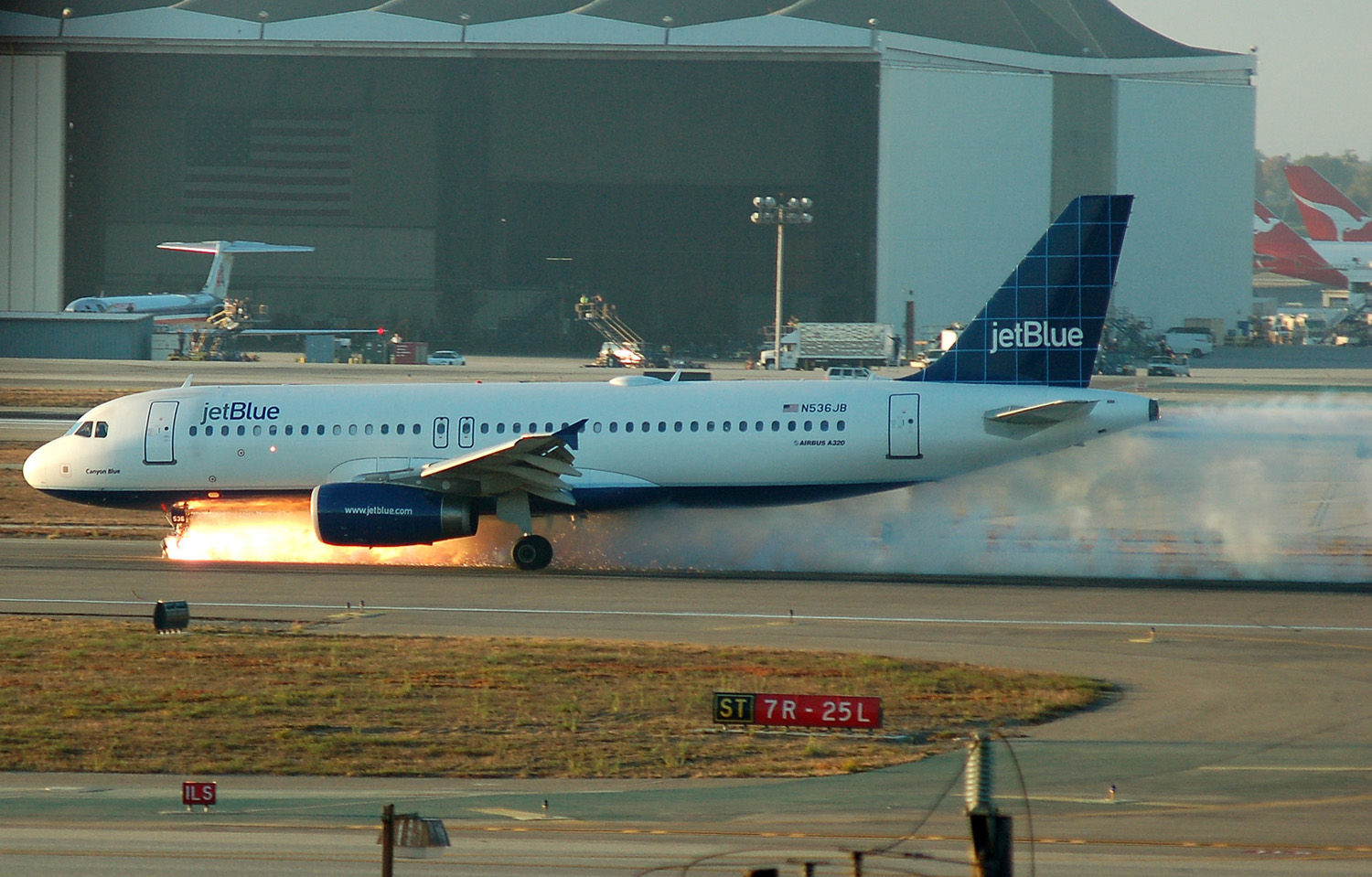
Front wheel of JetBlue Flight 292 on fire during an emergency landing

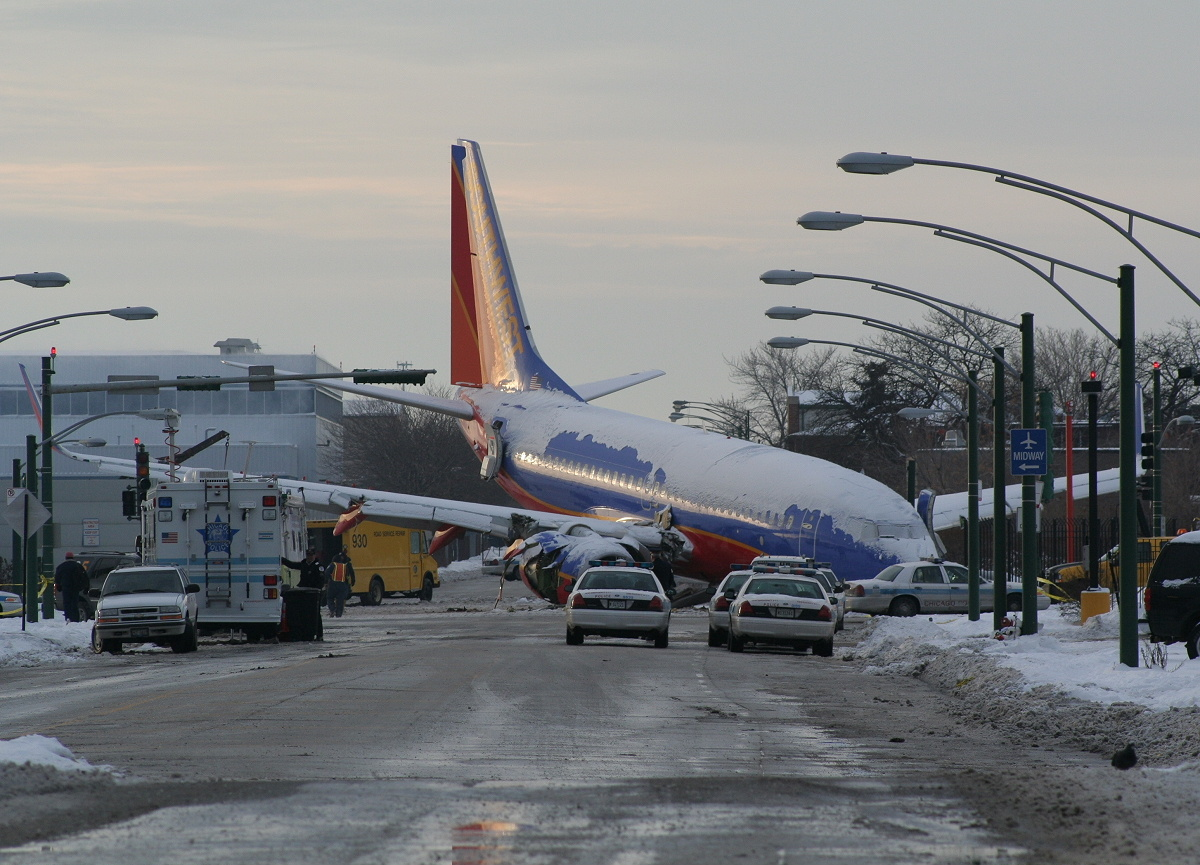
Southwest Airlines Flight 1248 after overrunning the runway

- February 3 – Kam Air Flight 904, a Boeing 737-200, crashed due to a snowstorm in the Pamir Mountains of Afghanistan. All 96 passengers and eight crew members died.
- February 20 – British Airways Flight 268, a Boeing 747-400, suffered a fire in engine no. 2 while taking off from Los Angeles bound for London. The plane flew on three engines to Manchester, where it performed an emergency landing. None of the 369 people on board were harmed.
- March 6 – Air Transat Flight 961, an Airbus A310, suffered rudder failure after takeoff from Varadero, Cuba; the aircraft returned to Cuba with no casualties.
- March 16 – Regional Airlines Flight 9288, an Antonov An-24RV, stalled and crashed into a hill near Varandey Airport, Russia, due to a possible instrument failure, killing 28 of 52 on board.
- March 25 – West Caribbean Airways Flight 9955, a Let L-410 Turbolet operating a domestic flight in Colombia, stalled due to engine failure and crashed into a forest shortly after departing from El Embrujo Airport on Providencia Island, killing nine of the 14 people on board.
- May 3 – Airwork Flight 23, a Fairchild SA227-AC Metro III operating a cargo flight between the north and south islands of New Zealand, broke up in mid-air and crashed in Stratford, North Island, due to pilot error, killing the two crew members.
- May 7 – In the Lockhart River air disaster, an Aero-Tropics Air Services Fairchild Swearingen Metroliner operating on behalf of Transair struck terrain on approach into Lockhart River Airport, Australia. All 15 passengers and crew were killed.
- July 16 – An Equatorial Express Antonov An-24 crashed into a mountainside near Baney in Equatorial Guinea, killing all 60 people on board.
- August 2 – Air France Flight 358, an Airbus A340-300, skidded off a runway while landing at Toronto Pearson International Airport, Ontario, Canada, and caught fire. There were no fatalities among the 309 on board, but 43 people were injured, and the aircraft was completely destroyed.
- August 6 – Tuninter Flight 1153, an ATR 72, ditched into the Mediterranean Sea near Palermo, Sicily; 14 of the 35 passengers and two of the four crew members died.
- August 10 – Copterline Flight 103, a Sikorsky S-76 helicopter, crashed in the sea off Tallinn, Estonia, killing all 14 on board.
- August 14 – Helios Airways Flight 522, a Boeing 737-300, crashed near Kalamos, Greece. All 115 passengers and six crew members died.
- August 16 – West Caribbean Airways Flight 708, a McDonnell Douglas MD-80, crashed in western Venezuela. All 152 passengers and eight crew members died.
- August 23 – TANS Perú Flight 204, a Boeing 737-200, crashed on approach to Captain Rolden International Airport, Pucalipa, Peru; 35 of the 91 passengers died, as well as five of the seven crew members.
- September 5 – Mandala Airlines Flight 091, a Boeing 737-200, crashed in Medan, Indonesia, killing 100 out of 117 people on board, along with 49 people on the ground.
- September 21 – JetBlue Flight 292, an Airbus A320, made an emergency landing at Los Angeles International Airport because of landing gear steering failure. There were no injuries to the 139 passengers and six crew members.
- October 22 – Bellview Airlines Flight 210, a Boeing 737-200, crashed shortly after takeoff from Murtala Muhammed International Airport in Lagos, Nigeria, killing all 117 people on board.
- December 8 – Southwest Airlines Flight 1248, a Boeing 737-700, slid off the runway during landing at Chicago Midway International Airport in heavy snow. None of the people on board were injured, but the plane hit two automobiles on the ground, killing one passenger.
- December 10 – Sosoliso Airlines Flight 1145, a McDonnell Douglas DC-9 with 110 people on board, crashed during landing in Port Harcourt, Nigeria. Of the 110 people on board, only two survived.
- December 19 – Chalk's Ocean Airways Flight 101, a Grumman Mallard, crashed off the coast of Miami Beach, Florida, killing all 20 on board.
- December 23 – Azerbaijan Airlines Flight 217, an Antonov An-140, crashed due to instrument failure shortly after takeoff from Baku Airport, killing all 23 on board.

=== 2006 ===
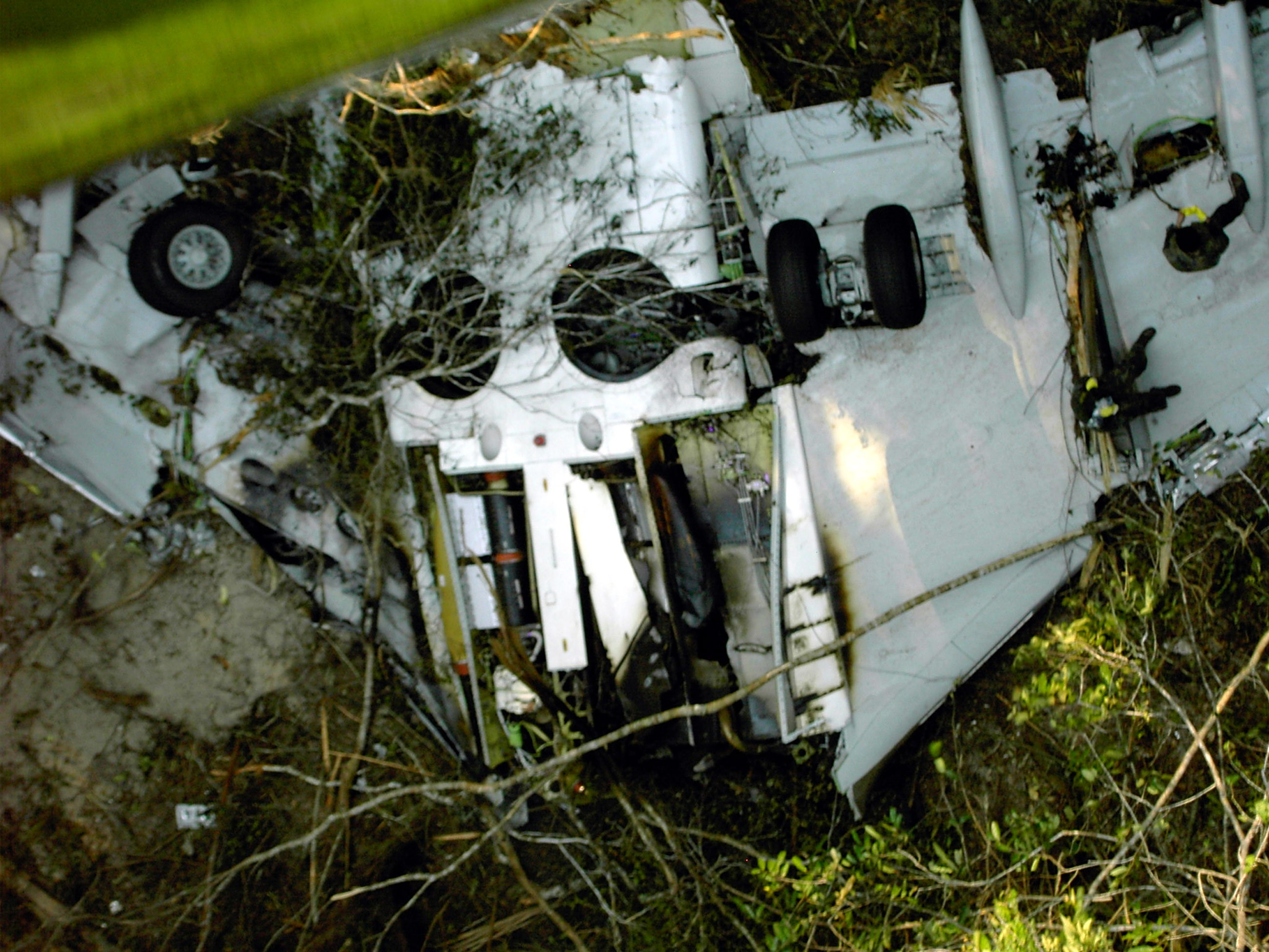
The wreckage of Gol Transportes Aéreos Flight 1907

- February 7 – UPS Airlines Flight 1307, a Douglas DC-8-71F performing a cargo flight from Atlanta, had an in-flight fire during approach to Philadelphia. The plane manged to land safely, but burned down. All three on board survived with injuries.
- March 31 – TEAM Linhas Aéreas Flight 6865, a Let L-410 Turbolet, crashed whilst conducting a VFR approach to Macaé Airport, Brazil. All 19 passengers and crew were killed.
- May 3 – Armavia Flight 967, an Airbus A320, crashed into the Black Sea near the Russian city of Sochi, killing all 113 on board.
- June 21 – In the 2006 Yeti Airlines Twin Otter crash, a DHC-6 Twin Otter crashed during a go-around at Jumla Airport, Nepal. All nine passengers and crew were killed.
- July 9 – S7 Airlines Flight 778, an Airbus A310, crashed into a concrete barricade at Irkutsk International Airport, Russia, upon landing and caught fire. Of the 203 people on board, 125 were killed.
- July 10 – Pakistan International Airlines Flight 688, a Fokker F27, crashed into a wheat field near Multan, Pakistan, ten minutes after taking off, killing all 41 passengers and four crew members.
- July 28 – FedEx Flight 630, a McDonnell Douglas MD-10, crashed on landing at Memphis International Airport, Tennessee, after the left main landing gear collapsed shortly after touchdown; all three crew members were seriously injured.
- August 13 – Air Algérie Flight 2208, a Lockheed L‑100 Hercules, crashed in Northern Italy as a result of an autopilot malfunction. All three on board were killed.
- August 22 – Pulkovo Aviation Enterprise Flight 612, a Tupolev Tu-154, crashed near Donetsk, Ukraine, killing all 170 people on board.
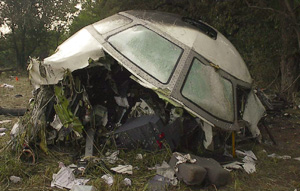
  The cockpit section of Comair Flight 5191
- August 27 – Comair Flight 5191, a Bombardier Canadair CRJ-100, crashed on takeoff at Blue Grass Airport, Kentucky, due to runway confusion; of the 50 passengers and crew, the only survivor was the first officer.
- September 1 – Iran Airtour Flight 945, a Tupolev Tu-154, crashed while attempting to land in Mashad, Iran, killing 28 of 148 on board.
- September 15 – EasyJet Flight 6074, an Airbus A319 en route from Alicante to Bristol, suffered an in-flight electric failure that caused loss of communication and most of the digital display of the instruments. The aircraft nearly collided with American Airlines Flight 63, a Boeing 777. All 144 on board the A319 survived without injury.
- September 23 – A Shree Air Mil Mi-8 helicopter crashed near Ghusna, Nepal, after a flight from Phungling, killing all 24 people on board.
- September 29 – Gol Transportes Aéreos Flight 1907, a Boeing 737-800, collided with an Embraer Legacy business jet and crashed in Mato Grosso, Brazil; the Embraer Legacy, with seven on board, landed safely with no reported injuries, while all 154 people on board the Boeing 737 died; this crash was the first loss of a Boeing 737-800.
- October 3 – Turkish Airlines Flight 1476, a Boeing 737, was hijacked in Greek airspace. The plane landed at Brindisi Airport, Italy, where the hijacker was arrested. All 113 people on board survived.

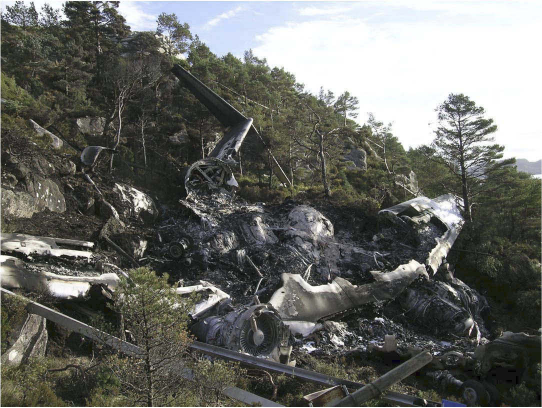
The wreckage of Atlantic Airways Flight 670

- October 10 – Atlantic Airways Flight 670, a BAe 146, slid off the runway at Stord Airport, Norway, due to hydroplaning and brake failure, killing four of the 16 people on board.
- October 28 – Continental Airlines Flight 1883, a Boeing 757, accidentally landed on a taxiway at Newark Liberty International Airport, New Jersey; none of the 154 people on board were injured.
- October 29 – ADC Airlines Flight 053, a Boeing 737-200, crashed near Abuja, Nigeria, after encountering wind shear, killing 96 of the 105 people on board.

=== 2007 ===
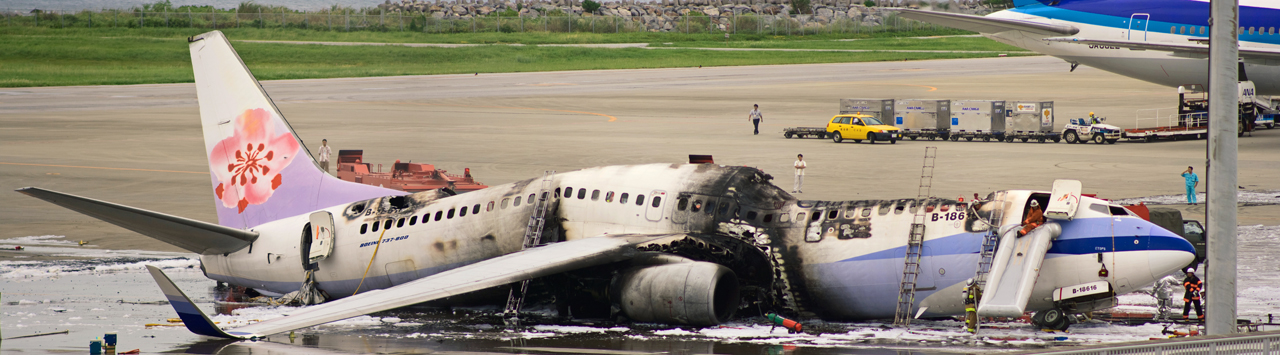
The remains of China Airlines Flight 120

- January 1 – Adam Air Flight 574, a Boeing 737-400 with 102 people on board, crashed into the ocean off the island of Sulawesi in Indonesia, killing all on board in the worst ever crash involving the 737-400.
- January 9 – An AerianTur-M Antonov An-26 crashed near Balad, Iraq, killing 34 of the 35 people on board. The official cause of the crash was poor weather conditions, but other sources claim that the plane was shot down by a missile.
- January 24 – Air West Flight 612, a Boeing 737 on a domestic flight in Sudan, was hijacked shortly after takeoff. The plane landed safely at N'Djamena International Airport, where the hijacker surrendered. All 103 people on board survived.
- January 25 – Régional Flight 7775, a Fokker 100, crashed shortly after takeoff from Pau Pyrénées Airport. All 54 people on board survived but one person on the ground was killed. The crash was attributed to icing.
- February 21 – Adam Air Flight 172, a Boeing 737-300, suffered structural damage while landing near Surabaya, Indonesia; none of the 149 people on board were seriously injured.
- March 7 – Garuda Indonesia Flight 200, a Boeing 737-400, overran the runway and crashed while landing at Yogyakarta, Indonesia, killing 21 of the 140 people on board.
- March 17 – UTair Flight 471, a Tupolev Tu-134, suffered severe structural damage while landing in Samara, Russia, killing six of the 63 people on board.
- March 23 – In the 2007 Mogadishu TransAVIAexport Airlines Il-76 crash, an Ilyushin Il-76 crashed near Mogadishu, Somalia, after allegedly being hit by a surface-to-air missile, killing all 11 on board.
- April 23 – An Aurigny Britten-Norman Trislander reported sighted strange objects while cruising at Alderny. The plane landed safely, with all 10 on board survived.
- May 5 – Kenya Airways Flight 507, a Boeing 737-800, crashed near Douala, Cameroon, killing all 114 on board.
- June 3 – In the 2007 Paramount Airlines Mil Mi-8 crash, a Mil Mi-8 helicopter crashed in Lungi, Sierra Leone, killing all 22 people on board.
- June 18 – Eagle Airways Flight 2300, a Beechcraft 1900D, belly-landed after the landing gears failed due to hydraulic failure. All 17 on board survived.
- June 25 – PMTair Flight 241, an Antonov An-24, crashed in southwestern Cambodia, killing all 22 on board.

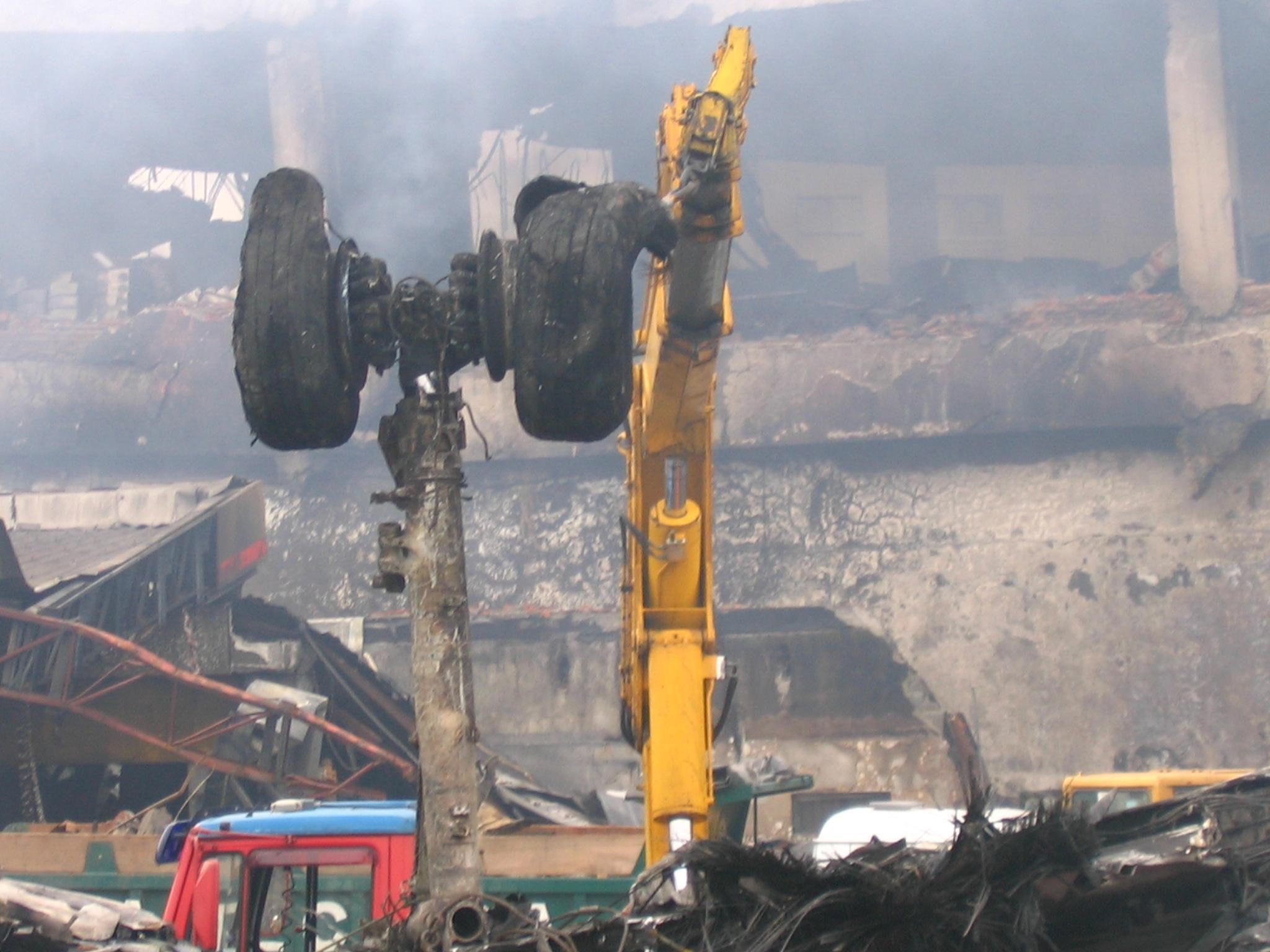
The wreckage of TAM Airlines Flight 3054

- July 17 – TAM Airlines Flight 3054, an Airbus A320, crashed at Congonhas-São Paulo Airport, Brazil, killing all 187 people on board and 12 on the ground.
- July 29 – ATRAN Flight 9655, an Antonov An-12, crashed following a bird strike after takeoff from Moscow Domodedovo Airport, Russia, killing all 7 people on board.
- August 9 – Air Moorea Flight 1121, a de Havilland Canada DHC-6, crashed into the lagoon of the island of Moʼorea in French Polynesia just 11 seconds after takeoff, killing all 20 on board.
- August 20 – China Airlines Flight 120, a Boeing 737-800, burst into flames after landing at Naha, Japan; none of the 165 passengers on board were seriously injured.
- Scandinavian Airlines System Dash 8 landing gear incidents:
  - September 9 – Scandinavian Airlines System Flight 1209, a de Havilland Canada Dash 8, experienced a landing gear failure in Aalborg, Denmark; none of the 73 people on board was seriously injured, but three days later, after a similar incident, the airline grounded the aircraft type.
  - September 12 – Scandinavian Airlines System Flight 2748, a de Havilland Canada Dash 8, experienced a landing gear failure in Vilnius, Lithuania; none of the 52 people on board was injured, but following a similar incident three days earlier, all their Dash 8s were grounded.
  - October 27 – Scandinavian Airlines System Flight 2867, a de Havilland Canada Dash 8, experienced a landing gear failure in Copenhagen, Denmark; none of the 44 people on board were injured, but because of similar incidents in September, the airline "permanently" removed its Dash 8s from service; the cause was eventually ascribed to maintenance error.
- September 16 – One-Two-GO Airlines Flight 269, a McDonnell Douglas MD-82 carrying 130 people, crashed and burst into flames after attempting to land in Phuket, Thailand, during poor weather conditions, killing 90 people.
- October 4 – An Africa One An-26 crashed in a residential area in Kinshasa, Democratic Republic of the Congo, shortly after taking off, killing at least 50 people, most of whom were on the ground.
- October 26 – Philippine Airlines Flight 475, an Airbus A320-200, overran the runway at Butuan airport after a flight from Manila. All 154 people on board survived with 19 injuries; the plane was written off.
- November 7 – Nationwide Airlines Flight 723, a Boeing 737-200, executed an emergency landing following the detachment of an engine from its right wing. All 112 occupants survived without injury.
- November 30 – Atlasjet Flight 4203, a McDonnell Douglas MD-83, crashed into a mountain near Isparta, Turkey, killing all 57 on board.

=== 2008 ===
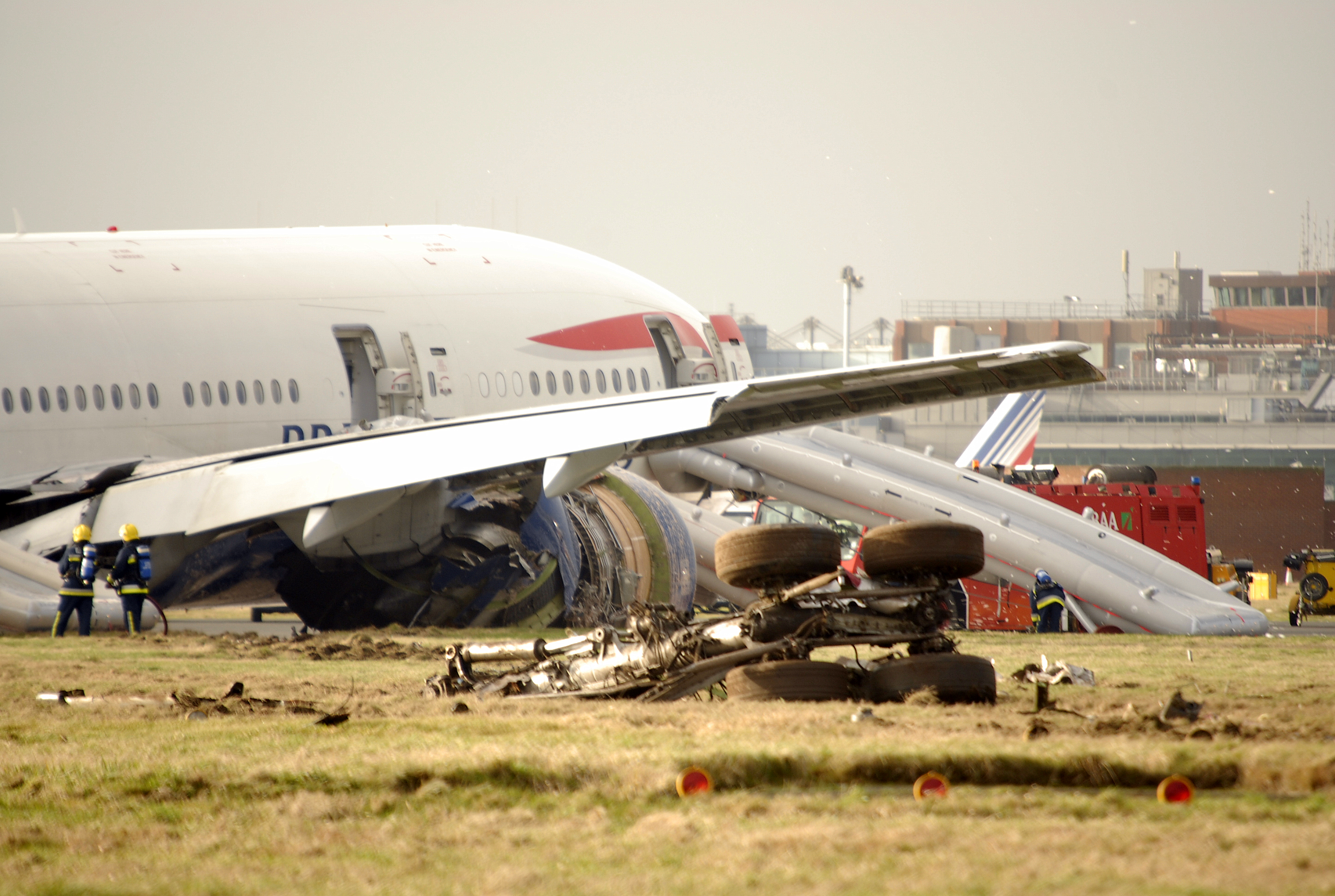
British Airways Flight 38

- January 4 – The 2008 Los Roques archipelago Transaven Let L-410 crash killed all 14 on board.
- January 17 – British Airways Flight 38, a Boeing 777-200ER, landed short of the runway at London Heathrow Airport because of a fuel system problem; all 152 on board survived. This was the first loss of a Boeing 777-200ER, and the first loss of any 777 due to an operational incident.
- February 1 – Lloyd Aéreo Boliviano Flight 301, a Boeing 727 flying from El Alto to Cobija, crash-landed in a swamp near Trinidad, after running out of fuel. All 156 people on board survived, with only two injuries.
- February 8 – Eagle Airways Flight 2279, a BAe Jetstream 32, was hijacked 10 minutes after taking off from Blenheim, New Zealand, by a passenger who attacked both pilots. The hijacker was eventually restrained by the co-pilot and the flight landed safely at Christchurch. All nine on board survived the incident.
- February 14 – Belavia Flight 1834, a Bombardier CRJ100, hit its left wing on the runway while taking off from Yerevan, Armenia. All 21 on board escaped the aircraft before it erupted into flames.
- February 21 – Santa Bárbara Airlines Flight 518, an ATR 42-300, crashed shortly after taking off from Mérida, Venezuela, killing all 46 on board.
- April 3 – In the 2008 Blue Wing Airlines An-28 crash, an Antonov An-28 operated by Blue Wing Airlines crashed near Benzdorp in Suriname. All 19 on board were killed.
- April 11 – Kata Air Transport Flight 007, a Sudanese Antonov An-32, crashed when returning shortly after taking off from Chişinău International Airport, Moldova, for a flight to Turkey. All eight on board were killed.
- April 15 – Hewa Bora Airways Flight 122, a McDonnell Douglas DC-9, crashed into a market near Goma, Democratic Republic of the Congo, killing 40 people, including three passengers.
- May 25 – Kalitta Air Flight 207, a Boeing 747-200, overran the runway at Brussels, Belgium. No one was injured but the aircraft was written off.
- May 26 – Moskovia Airlines Flight 9675, an Antonov An-12, crashed shortly after takeoff from Chelyabinsk Airport, Russia, due to an onboard fire. All nine crew members were killed.
- May 30 – TACA Flight 390, an Airbus A320, overran the runway at Toncontín International Airport in Tegucigalpa, Honduras, killing five (including two on ground).
- June 10 – Sudan Airways Flight 109, an Airbus A310, overran the runway at Khartoum International Airport and broke apart due to a long flaring distance. Of the 214 people on board, 30 were killed.
- June 30 – Aeroflot Flight 846, a Tupolev Tu-154 on a passenger flight to Moscow, Russia, suffered an uncontained engine failure during takeoff, which had to be rejected. None of the 112 occupants onboard were killed or injured.
- July 6 – USA Jet Airlines Flight 199, a McDonnell Douglas DC-9 operating a cargo flight from Louisiana to Mexico, crashed on approach to Saltillo International Airport, Mexico, killing the captain; the first officer was also injured.
- July 7 – Centurion Air Cargo Flight 164, a Boeing 747-200BSF operated by Kalitta Air, crashed because of an engine failure shortly after taking off from El Dorado International Airport in Bogota, Colombia. All eight crew survived, but two on the ground were killed.
- July 25 – Qantas Flight 30, a Boeing 747-400 en route from Hong Kong to Melbourne, performed an emergency descent and landed in Manila after a hull penetration resulted in rapid decompression; all on board survived.
- July 31 – East Coast Jets Flight 81, a Hawker 800, overran the runway and crashed in a cornfield near Owatonna Degner Regional Airport in Minnesota. All eight on board were killed.
- August 20 – Spanair Flight 5022, a McDonnell Douglas MD-82, crashed on takeoff at Barajas Airport in Madrid, Spain. Of the 172 people on board, 154 were killed.
- August 24 – In the 2008 Aéreo Ruta Maya crash, a Cessna 208 Caravan crashed 45 minutes after takeoff from La Aurora International Airport, Guatemala, en route to El Estor, Guatemala; 11 of the 14 passengers and crew were killed.
- August 24 – Iran Aseman Airlines Flight 6895, a Boeing 737, crashed just after takeoff from Manas Airport in Bishkek, Kyrgyzstan; 65 of the 90 passengers and crew were killed.

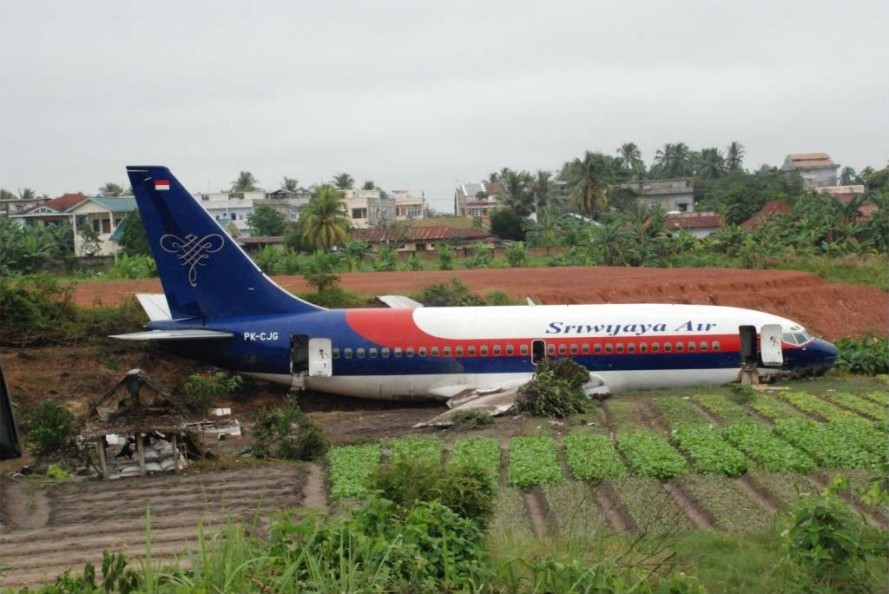
Sriwijaya Air Flight 062

- August 27 – Sriwijaya Air Flight 062, a Boeing 737-200, overran the runway at Sultan Thaha Airport, Indonesia, during a landing attempt, resulting in 26 injuries (14 of them serious). One person on the ground later died from their injuries.
- August 30 – In the 2008 Conviasa Boeing 737 crash, a Boeing 737-200 crashed in Illiniza, Ecuador, whilst en route to Cotopaxi International Airport, Ecuador. All three on board were killed.
- September 14 – Aeroflot Flight 821, a Boeing 737, crashed due to pilot error on approach to Perm Airport from Moscow, killing all 88 people on board in the worst ever accident involving the Boeing 737-500.
- October 7 – Qantas Flight 72, an Airbus A330-300, made an emergency landing in Exmouth, Australia, following a rapid descent that left over 70 people injured, 14 of them seriously.
- October 8 – Yeti Airlines Flight 103, a de Havilland Canada DHC-6 Twin Otter, crashed 60 nautical miles (110 km) from Mount Everest, Nepal, killing 18 of 19 people on board.
- November 10 – Ryanair Flight 4102, a Boeing 737, suffered up to 90 bird strikes on its final approach to Rome Ciampino Airport, damaging landing gear and both engines. The aircraft landed safely; 10 of the 172 on board were treated for minor injuries.
- November 27 – XL Airways Germany Flight 888T, an Airbus A320, crashed in the Mediterranean Sea on approach to Perpignan-Rivesaltes Airport, France. All seven on board were killed.

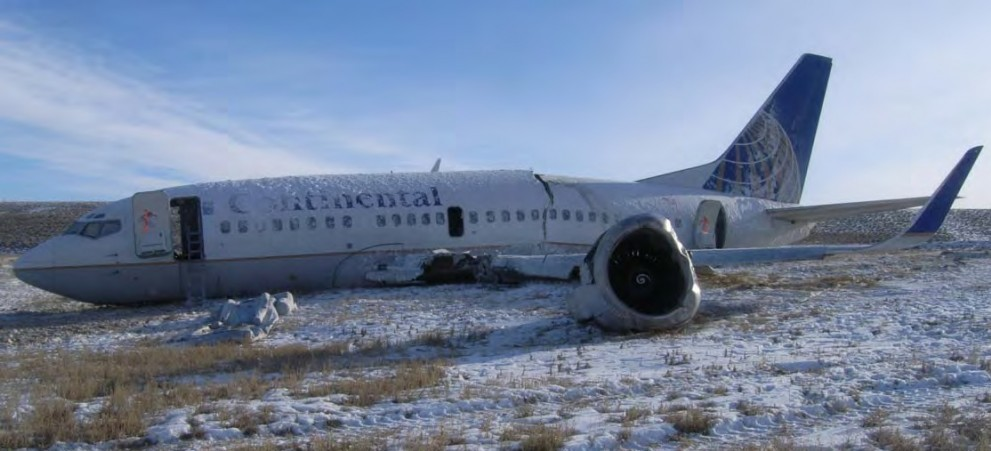
Continental Airlines Flight 1404

- December 20 – Continental Airlines Flight 1404, a Boeing 737-500 with 115 people on board, veered off the runway during takeoff from Denver International Airport, then came to rest in a ravine near the runway and caught fire; 38 people were injured.

=== 2009 ===
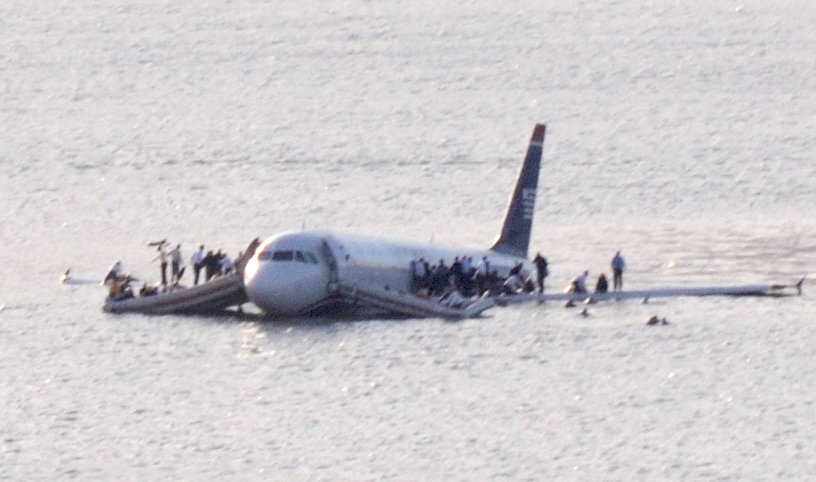
US Airways Flight 1549 floating in the Hudson River

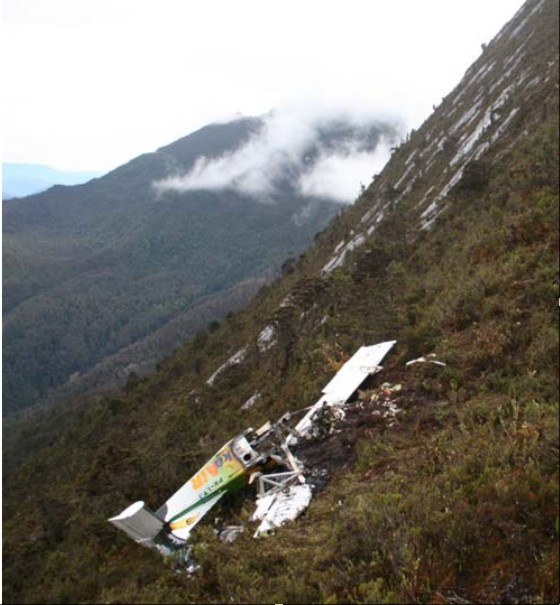
Wreckage of Mimika Air Flight 514 after crashing

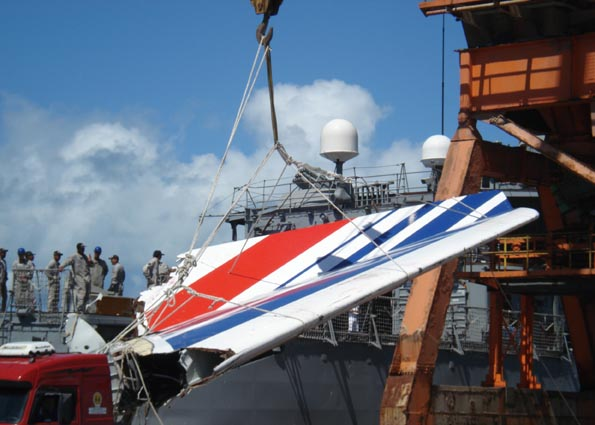
Vertical stabilizer of Air France Flight 447 after being recovered from the Atlantic Ocean

- January 15 – US Airways Flight 1549, an Airbus A320 bound for Charlotte, North Carolina, ditched in the Hudson River shortly after taking off from LaGuardia Airport, New York City, following total engine failure caused by multiple bird strikes; all 155 people on board survived the accident.
- January 27 – Empire Airlines Flight 8284, an ATR 42-300 operating a FedEx cargo flight in Texas, United States, crashed on approach to Lubbock Preston Smith International Airport because of pilot error; the two pilots on board survived the accident but the aircraft was destroyed.
- February 7 – A Manaus Aerotáxi Embraer EMB 110 crashed in the Amazon basin near Santo António, Brazil, because of overloading, killing 24 of the 28 people on board.
- February 12 – Colgan Air Flight 3407, a de Havilland Canada Dash 8-Q400 flying from Newark, New Jersey, to Buffalo, New York, United States, crashed into a house in Clarence Center, New York state, killing all 49 on board the aircraft and one person on the ground.
- February 20 – Aerolift Flight 1015, an Antonov An-12, experienced an engine fire during takeoff and crashed shortly after, killing all 5 crew members on board.
- February 25 – Turkish Airlines Flight 1951, a Boeing 737-800 flying from Istanbul, Turkey, to Amsterdam, Netherlands, stalled and crashed into a field during final approach to Schiphol Airport, killing nine of the 135 people on board.
- March 9 – An Aerolift Ilyushin Il-76 lost two of its engines and crashed into Lake Victoria during its cargo flight, killing all 11 on board and injuring 2 on the ground.
- March 12 – Cougar Helicopters Flight 91, a Sikorsky S-92 transporting workers to oil platforms off Canada's Newfoundland coast, ditched in the Atlantic Ocean 34 miles (55 km) east-southeast of Newfoundland because of a main gearbox failure; 17 of the 18 on board were killed.
- March 20 – Emirates Flight 407, an Airbus A340-500 en route from Auckland, New Zealand, to Dubai, United Arab Emirates, suffered a tailstrike when attempting to take off from its intermediate stopover at Melbourne's Tullamarine Airport; the aircraft returned to the airport with no casualties.
- March 23 – FedEx Express Flight 80, a McDonnell Douglas MD-11 operating a cargo flight from Guangzhou, China, to Narita, Japan, crashed while attempting to land at Tokyo Narita International Airport, killing the two crew members.
- April 1 – Bond Offshore Helicopters Flight 85N, a Eurocopter AS332 Super Puma returning from the Miller oilfield off the Aberdeenshire coast, Scotland, crashed 11 nautical miles (20 km) northeast of Peterhead because of a catastrophic failure of the main rotor gearbox; all 16 on board were killed.
- April 9 – An Aviastar BAe 146-300 crashed into Pikei Hill during a domestic cargo flight from Jayapura to Wamena, Indonesia, killing all six crew members.
- April 17 – Mimika Air Flight 514, a Pilatus PC-6 operating a domestic flight in Western New Guinea, Indonesia, crashed into Mount Gergaji because of pilot error, killing all 11 people on board.
- April 19 – CanJet Flight 918, a Boeing 737 operating a flight from Montego Bay, Jamaica, to Halifax, Canada, was seized on the ground before takeoff by a lone gunman; all 174 passengers were quickly released, but six crew members were taken hostage for several hours before being freed unharmed.
- June 1 – Air France Flight 447, an Airbus A330 flying from Rio de Janeiro, Brazil, to Paris, France, crashed in the Atlantic Ocean, killing all 228 people on board; bodies and aircraft debris were recovered within days but the main fuselage and the black boxes were not found until 2011; this remains the deadliest accident involving the A330.
- June 30 – Yemenia Flight 626, an Airbus A310 flying from Sanaa, Yemen, to Moroni, Comoros, crashed into the Indian Ocean on approach to Prince Said Ibrahim International Airport because of pilot error; all but one of the 153 occupants were killed, the sole survivor being a 12-year-old girl who was found clinging to the wreckage.
- July 13 – Southwest Airlines Flight 2294, a Boeing 737 en route from Nashville, Tennessee, to Baltimore, Maryland, United States, made an emergency landing in Charleston, West Virginia, after a large hole opened in the skin of the fuselage at 34,000 feet (10,000 m) causing a loss of cabin pressure; the aircraft landed safely and no-one was injured.
- July 15 – Caspian Airlines Flight 7908, a Tupolev Tu-154 flying from Tehran, Iran, to Yerevan, Armenia, crashed 16 minutes after takeoff because of uncontained engine failure, killing all 168 people on board.
- July 24 – Aria Air Flight 1525, an Ilyushin Il-62 operating a domestic flight in Iran, overshot the runway while attempting to land at Mashhad International Airport, killing 16 of the 173 on board.
- August 2 – Merpati Nusantara Airlines Flight 9760, a de Havilland Canada DHC-6 Twin Otter operating a domestic flight in the Indonesian province of Papua, crashed into a mountain on approach to Oksibil Airport because of pilot error; all 15 people on board were killed.
- August 4 – Bangkok Airways Flight 266, an ATR 72-200 operating a domestic flight in Thailand, crashed while attempting to land at Samui Airport on Ko Samui island, resulting in at least one confirmed death and 37 injuries amongst the 72 people on board.
- August 11 – Airlines PNG Flight 4684, a de Havilland Canada DHC-6 Twin Otter operating a domestic flight in southeastern Papua New Guinea, crashed into mountainous terrain because of poor visibility while on approach to Kokoda Airport; all 13 people on board died in the accident.
- September 9 – Aeroméxico Flight 576, a Boeing 737 flying from Cancún to Mexico City, Mexico, was hijacked by a Bolivian man carrying a fake explosive device; after landing in Mexico City, the aircraft was stormed by officials and all 107 passengers and crew were released unharmed.
- September 24 – Airlink Flight 8911, a BAe Jetstream 41 operating a domestic flight in South Africa, crashed into a school shortly after taking off from Durban International Airport; the pilot died two weeks later from injuries sustained in the crash.
- October 21 – Northwest Airlines Flight 188, an Airbus A320, overshot its destination because of pilot distraction. The plane then reached its destination without any deaths or injuries.
- October 21 – Azza Transport Flight 2241, a Boeing 707 bound for Khartoum, Sudan, crashed on takeoff from Sharjah International Airport, United Arab Emirates, because of pilot error; all six on board were killed.
- October 22 – Divi Divi Air Flight 014, a Britten Norman BN-2A Islander on a flight from Curaçao Airport to Bonaire Airport, crashed off the coast of Bonaire because of engine failure, killing one of the nine people on board.
- November 12 – RwandAir Flight 205, a Bombardier CRJ-100 bound for Entebbe, Uganda, crashed into a VIP terminal building at Kigali International Airport in Rwanda shortly after returning for an emergency landing because of difficulties with the flight controls; one of the 10 passengers was killed.
- November 28 – Avient Aviation Flight 324, a McDonnell Douglas MD-11F bound for Manas International Airport, Kyrgyzstan, overshot the runway during takeoff at Shanghai Pudong International Airport, China, killing three of the seven crew members.
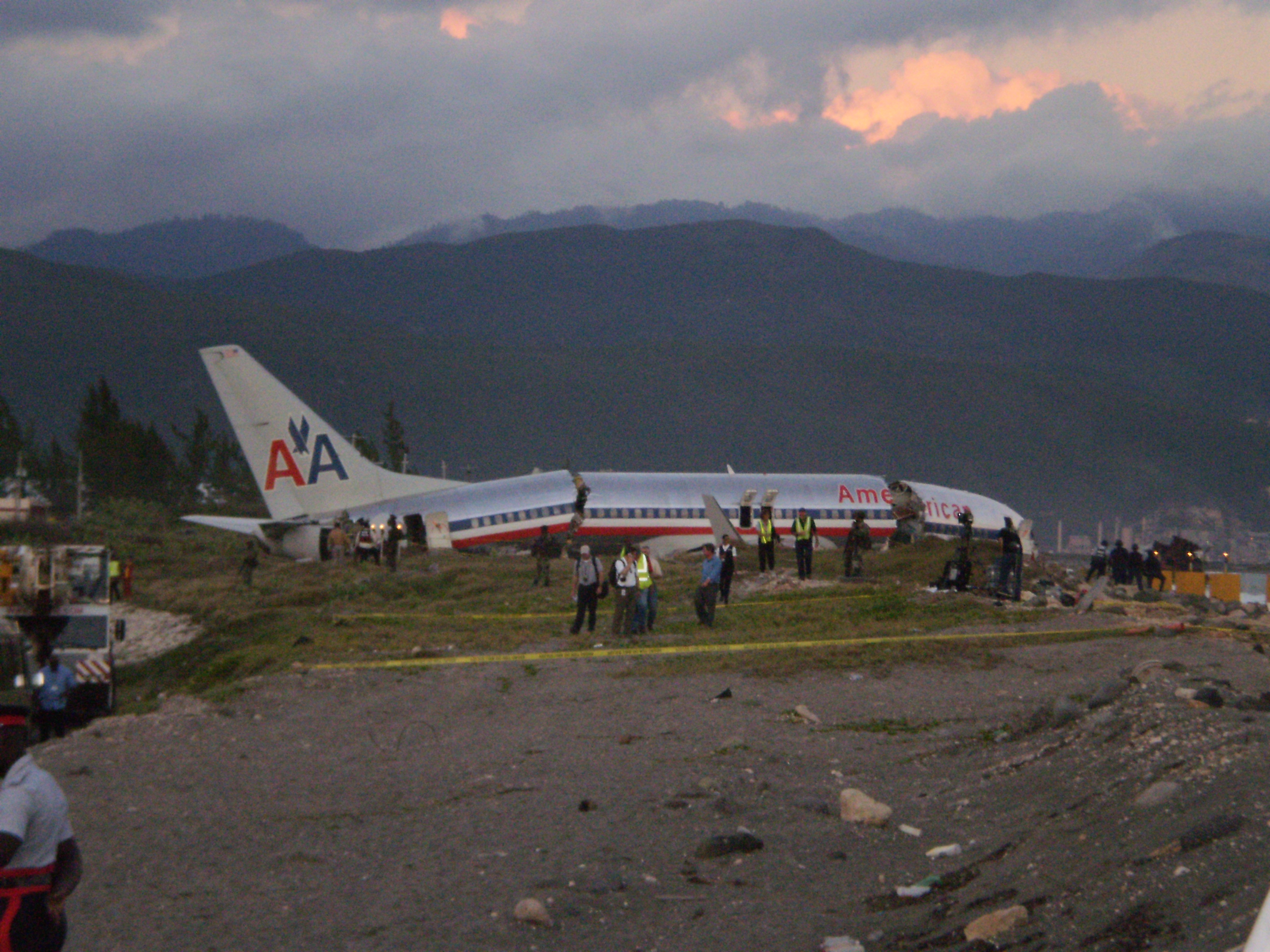
  The aftermath of American Airlines Flight 331
- December 22 – American Airlines Flight 331, a Boeing 737-800 operating a flight from the United States to Kingston, Jamaica, overshot the runway on landing at Norman Manley International Airport because of pilot error. All 154 on board survived, some with multiple injuries, but the aircraft was written off.
- December 25 – Northwest Airlines Flight 253, an Airbus A330-300 flying from Amsterdam Airport Schiphol, Netherlands, to Detroit Metropolitan Airport, Michigan, United States, was attacked by a man using a small explosive device, causing a small onboard fire; the perpetrator was subdued by passengers and crew, and the fire was quickly extinguished.

== 2010s ==
=== 2010 ===
- January 2 - Danube Wings Flight 8230, a Boeing 737-400 was hidden explosives by the Slovak Police as part of a training exercise. All but one of the explosives were removed. That explosive was flown to Dublin. The aircraft caused an international incident.
- January 24 – Taban Air Flight 6437, a Tupolev Tu-154M operating a domestic flight in Iran, crashed while making an emergency landing at Mashhad International Airport; all 170 occupants survived, with 47 receiving minor injuries.
- January 25 – Ethiopian Airlines Flight 409, a Boeing 737-800 bound for the Ethiopian capital, Addis Ababa, crashed into the Mediterranean Sea shortly after takeoff from Beirut Rafic Hariri International Airport; all 90 people on board were killed.
- March 22 – Aviastar-TU Flight 1906, a Tupolev Tu-204 flying from Hurghada, Egypt, to Moscow, Russia, crashed on landing at Domodedovo International Airport in foggy weather. All eight crew survived, but the aircraft was written off; this was the first loss involving a Tu-204.
- April 7 – On board United Airlines Flight 663, a Boeing 757, a Qatari diplomat caused an international incident by smoking in the lavatory and then being suspected of attempting a hijacking. All 163 people on board survived.
- April 13 – AeroUnion Flight 302, an Airbus A300B4F operating a cargo flight from Mexico City, crashed following a missed approach to Monterrey International Airport, Mexico; all five crew members were killed, as well as one person on the ground.
- April 13 – Merpati Nusantara Airlines Flight 836, a Boeing 737 operating a domestic flight in Indonesia, overshot the runway at Rendani Airport; all 103 people on board survived, with three seriously injured.
- April 13 – Cathay Pacific Flight 780, an Airbus A330 flying from Juanda International Airport, Indonesia, to Hong Kong, conducted an emergency landing after the engine thrust controls malfunctioned because of contaminated fuel; 57 of the 309 passengers were injured in the following evacuation.

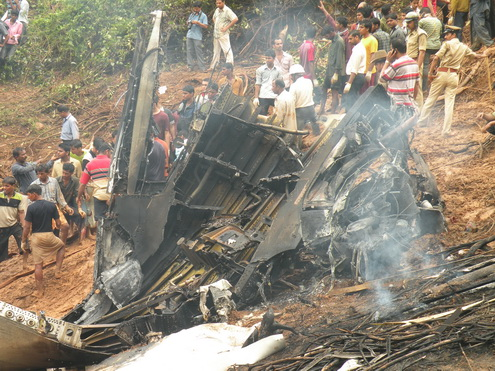
Remains of Air India Express Flight 812

- May 12 – Afriqiyah Airways Flight 771, an Airbus A330 operating a flight from Johannesburg, South Africa, to Tripoli International Airport, Libya, crashed while attempting to land in low visibility, killing all but one of the 104 people on board.
- May 17 – Pamir Airways Flight 112, an Antonov An-24 operating a domestic flight in Afghanistan, crashed shortly after taking off from Kunduz Airport; all 44 occupants were killed.
- May 22 – Air India Express Flight 812, a Boeing 737-800 flying from Dubai, United Arab Emirates, to Mangalore, India, crashed after overshooting the runway at Mangalore International Airport; 158 of the 166 people on board were killed.
- June 19 – A CASA C-212 Aviocar crashed near Djoum, Cameroon, while operating a charter flight to Yangadou, Republic of the Congo; all 11 occupants were killed, including the entire board of Sundance Resources, an Australian mining conglomerate.
- June 19 – A Douglas C-47, operating a sightseeing flight over Berlin, crashed shortly after take off. All 28 people on board survived, but seven were injured.
- June 23 – Aéropro Flight 201, a Beechcraft A100 King Air, crashed shortly after take off from Quebec City. All seven people on board were killed.
- July 27 – Lufthansa Cargo Flight 8460, a McDonnell Douglas MD-11 operating a multi-leg flight from Frankfurt, Germany, to Hong Kong in southern China, crashed on landing at King Khalid International Airport in Saudi Arabia; both occupants of the aircraft survived the accident.
- July 28 – Airblue Flight 202, an Airbus A321 operating a domestic flight in Pakistan, crashed in the Margalla Hills northeast of Islamabad, resulting in the deaths of all 152 people on board; it was the first fatal accident involving an Airbus A321 and Pakistan's worst aviation accident.
- August 3 – Katekavia Flight 9357, an Antonov An-24 operating a domestic flight in Russia, crashed on approach to Igarka Airport in Krasnoyarsk Krai, killing 12 of the 15 people on board.
- August 16 – AIRES Flight 8250, a Boeing 737 operating a domestic flight in Colombia, broke apart after crashing while landing at Gustavo Rojas Pinilla Airport in San Andrés; of the 131 occupants, two passengers were killed and another 129 were injured.
- August 24 – Agni Air Flight 101, a Dornier Do 228 operating a domestic flight in Nepal, crashed near Shikharpur in heavy rain, shortly after departing from Kathmandu, killing all 14 people on board.
- August 24 – Henan Airlines Flight 8387, an Embraer E-190 operating a domestic flight in China, overshot the runway and crashed at Yichun, Heilongjiang, killing 44 of the 96 occupants; this was the first hull loss involving an Embraer E-Jet.
- August 25 – A Filair Let L-410 Turbolet crashed on approach to Bandundu Airport, Democratic Republic of the Congo, killing all but one of the 21 on board.
- September 3 – UPS Airlines Flight 6, a Boeing 747-400 flying from Dubai, United Arab Emirates, to Cologne, Germany, crashed at Nad Al Sheba Military camp, Dubai, while attempting to perform an emergency landing following an in-flight cargo fire, killing both crew members.
- September 7 – Alrosa Flight 514, a Tupolev Tu-154M operating a domestic flight in Russia, performed a successful emergency landing at Izhma Airport after suffering in-flight electrical failure; the aircraft overshot the runway after landing but all 81 passengers and crew survived the accident uninjured.
- September 13 – Conviasa Flight 2350, an ATR-42 operating a domestic flight in Venezuela, crashed shortly before landing at Guayana International Airport, killing 17 of the 51 people on board
- October 12 – Transafrik International Flight 662, a Lockheed L-100, crashed on approach to Hamid Karzai International Airport in Kabul, Afghanistan. All eight occupants died.
- November 4 – Aero Caribbean Flight 883, an ATR-72 bound for Cuba from Haiti, lost control in icing conditions and crashed in the central Cuban province of Sancti Spíritus, killing all 68 occupants.
- November 4 – Qantas Flight 32, an Airbus A380 flying from London Heathrow Airport to Sydney, Australia, suffered an uncontained engine failure after taking off from Changi Airport in Singapore; the flight returned to the airport and landed safely, with all 469 people on board unharmed.

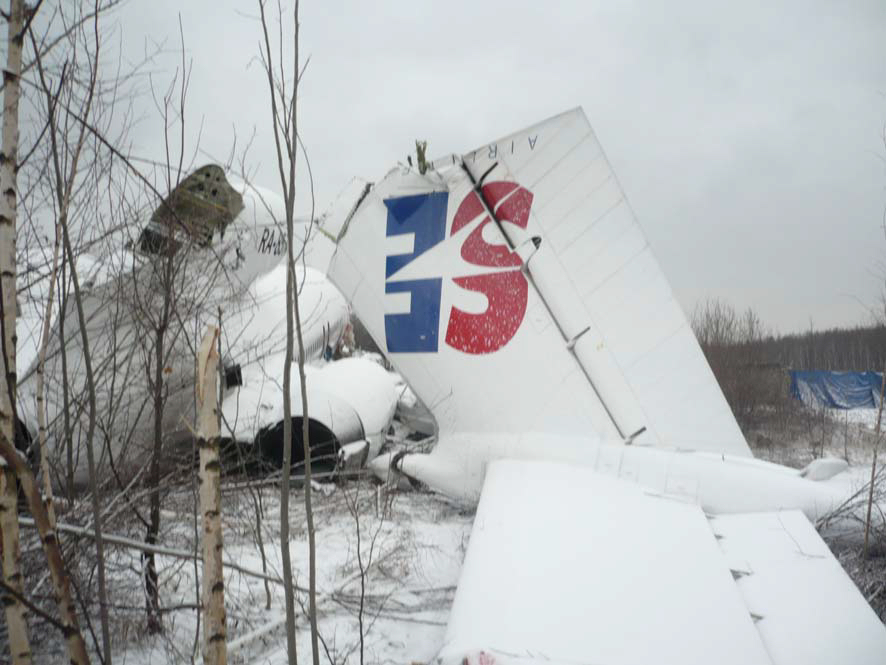
Remains of Dagestan Airlines Flight 372

- November 5 – JS Air Flight 201, a Beechcraft 1900 operating a domestic charter flight in Pakistan, crashed shortly after takeoff from Jinnah International Airport, Karachi, following an engine malfunction; all 21 people on board were killed.
- November 11 – A Tarco Airlines Antonov An-24 crashed on landing at Zalingei Airport, Sudan, killing between two and six of the 44 occupants.
- November 28 – Sun Way Flight 4412, an Ilyushin Il-76TD flying from Karachi, Pakistan, to Khartoum, Sudan, suffered an engine fire and crashed near Jinnah International Airport, killing all eight crew and another four people on the ground.
- December 4 – Dagestan Airlines Flight 372, a Tupolev Tu-154 operating a domestic flight in Russia, skidded off the runway during an emergency landing at Domodedovo International Airport, killing two of the 160 passengers and injuring 92.
- December 15 – A Tara Air DHC-6 Twin Otter crashed in the Bilandu Forest near Shreechaur, Okhaldhunga District, Nepal, killing all 22 passengers and crew.

=== 2011 ===
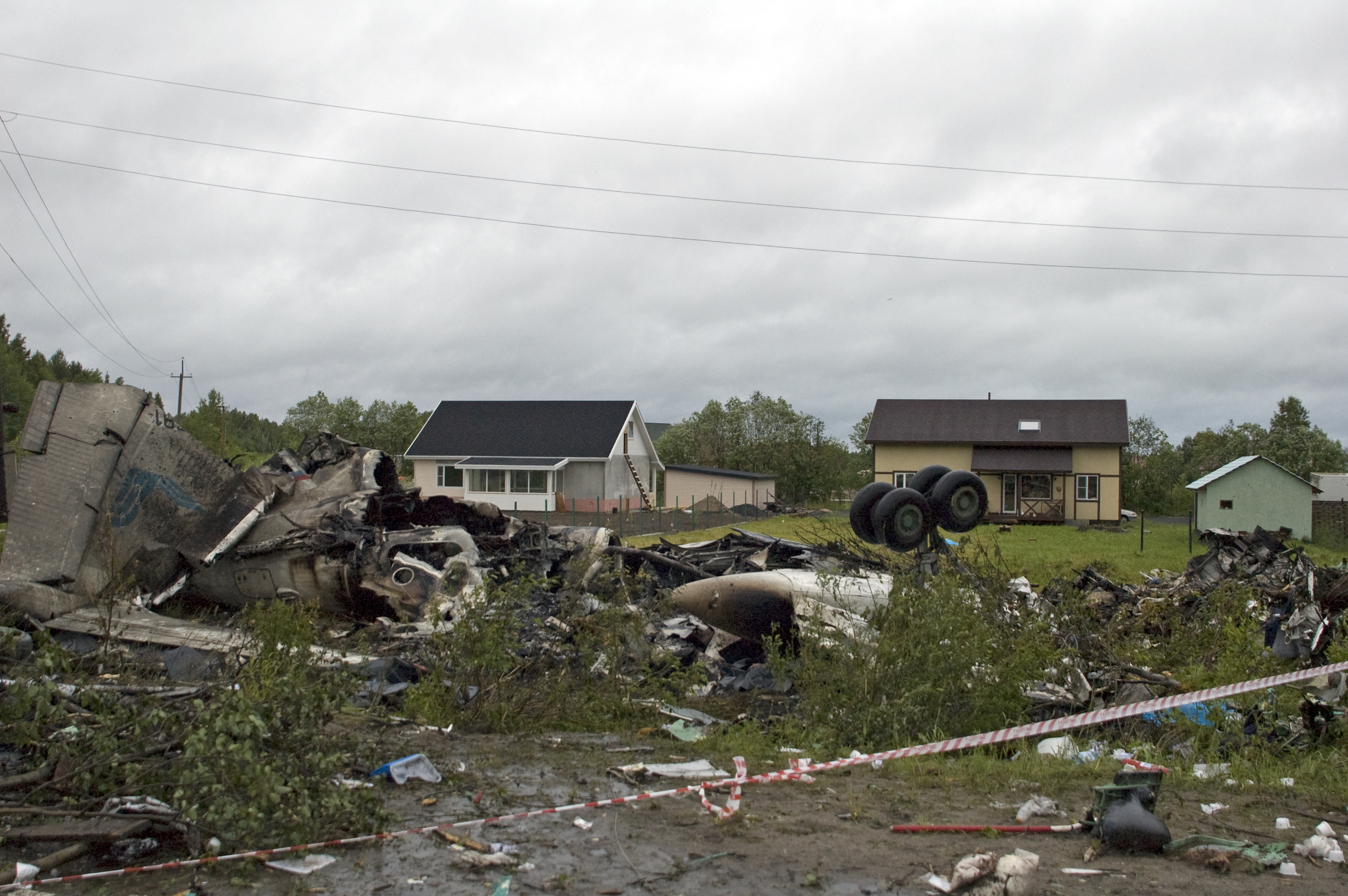
Remains of RusAir Flight 9605

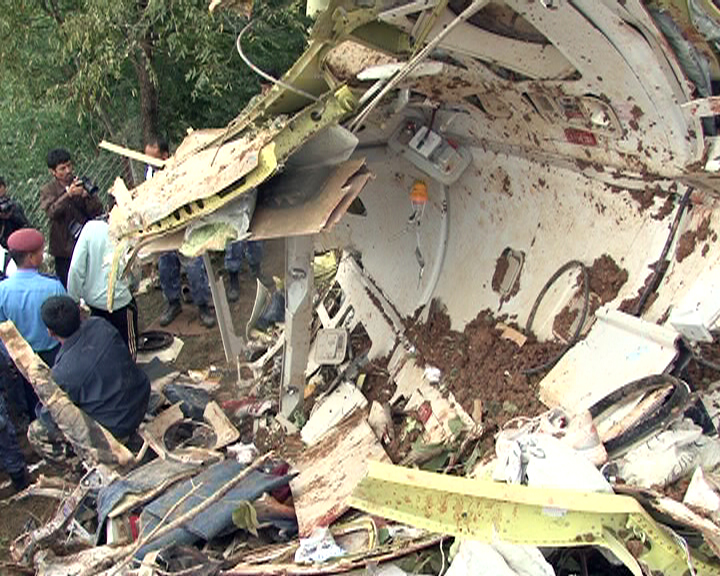
Wreckage of Buddha Air Flight 103

- January 1 – Kolavia Flight 348, a Tupolev Tu-154, caught fire while taxiing at Surgut International Airport, Russia, killing three out of the 124 occupants and injuring 43.
- January 9 – Iran Air Flight 277, a Boeing 727, crashed at Urmia Airport, Iran, during a go-around, killing 77 of the 105 occupants.
- February 10 – Manx2 Flight 7100, a Fairchild Metroliner III, crashed at Cork Airport, Ireland, whilst attempting to land in low visibility conditions, killing six of 12 people on board.
- February 14 – Central American Airways Flight 731, a Let L-410 Turbolet, crashed while on approach to Toncontín International Airport, Honduras, killing all 14 occupants.
- March 21 – A Trans Air Congo Antonov An-12 crashed on approach to Pointe Noire Airport, Republic of the Congo, killing all four crew and another 19 on the ground.
- April 1 – Southwest Airlines Flight 812, a Boeing 737, suffered a structural failure of the plane's fuselage skin at 36,000 feet, causing the cabin to lose pressure shortly after takeoff from Phoenix Sky Harbor International Airport, Arizona. The plane landed safely at Yuma International Airport, with two passengers suffering minor injuries.
- April 4 – Georgian Airways Flight 834, a Bombardier CRJ-100 operated by the United Nations Mission in the Democratic Republic of the Congo (MONUSCO), crashed on landing at N'djili Airport; 32 of the 33 people on board were killed.
- April 19 – A Pawan Hans Mil Mi-17 helicopter crashed near Tawang, India, because of a rupture of the main rotor; 17 of 23 people on board were killed.
- May 7 – Merpati Nusantara Airlines Flight 8968, a Xian MA60, crashed off the coast of West Papua, Indonesia, while on approach to Kaimana Airport in heavy rain, killing all 25 passengers and crew.
- May 18 – Sol Líneas Aéreas Flight 5428, a Saab 340, crashed off Prahuaniyeu, Río Negro, Argentina, while en route to General Enrique Mosconi International Airport, Comodoro Rivadavia. The crash, caused by ice formation on the wings, propellers and under the fuselage, killed all 22 passengers and crew.
- June 20 – RusAir Flight 9605, a Tupolev Tu-134, crashed onto a highway near the village of Besovets, Petrozavodsk, Russia, while on approach to Petrozavodsk Airport, killing 47 of the 52 on board.
- July 4 – A Missinippi Airways Cessna 208 Caravan overran the runway and crashed in a ravine at Pukatawagan Airport, Manitoba, Canada, following an aborted takeoff. One passenger was killed.
- July 6 – A Silk Way Airlines Ilyushin Il-76 crashed into a mountain 25 kilometres (16 mi) short of Bagram Air Base in Afghanistan, killing all nine people on board the cargo flight from Baku, operated on behalf of NATO.
- July 8 – Hewa Bora Airways Flight 952, a Boeing 727, crashed on landing at Bangoka International Airport, Democratic Republic of the Congo, killing 74 of the 118 on board.
- July 11 – Angara Airlines Flight 9007, an Antonov An-24, ditched in the Ob River, Russia, following an engine fire, killing seven of 37 on board.
- July 13 – Noar Linhas Aéreas Flight 4896, a Let L-410 Turbolet, crashed shortly after takeoff from Recife Airport, Brazil, killing all 16 on board.
- July 28 – Asiana Airlines Flight 991, a Boeing 747 freighter, crashed into the Pacific Ocean, 112 kilometres (70 mi) west of Jeju Island, South Korea, killing the two crew.
- July 29 – EgyptAir Flight 667, a Boeing 777, suffered a cockpit fire at Cairo International Airport, injuring two firefighters and five of the 317 on board.
- July 30 – Caribbean Airlines Flight 523, a Boeing 737, overran the runway on landing at Cheddi Jagan International Airport, Georgetown, Guyana, and broke in two; all 163 passengers and crew survived, with seven injured.
- August 8 – IrAero Flight 103, an Antonov An-24, missed the approach and crashed into a forrest, injuring 15 of the 41 on board, but no fatalities.
- August 9 – Avis-Amur Flight 9209, an Antonov An-12 en route from Magadan Airport to Keperveyem Airport, crashed at Omsukchan, Russia, following an engine fire, killing all 11 on board.
- August 20 – First Air Flight 6560, a Boeing 737, crashed while on approach to Resolute Bay Airport, Nunavut, Canada, killing 12 of the 15 on board.
- September 6 – Aerocon Flight 238, a Fairchild Metroliner III, crashed near Trinidad, Bolivia, killing eight of the nine people on board.
- September 6 – All Nippon Airways Flight 140, a Boeing 737-781 flying from Naha to Tokyo, experiences an in-flight upset. The plane landed safely and all 117 people on board survived, with two injured.
- September 7 – A Yak-Service Yakovlev Yak-42 crashed shortly after takeoff from Tunoshna Airport, Yaroslavl, Russia, because of pilot error, killing 44 of the 45 people on board. Many were players and staff of the Lokomotiv Yaroslavl ice hockey team of the KHL, as the flight was destined for Minsk, Belarus, for a league game.
- September 25 – Buddha Air Flight 103, a Beechcraft 1900D, crashed in dense fog while attempting to land at Kathmandu Tribhuvan International Airport, Nepal, killing all 16 passengers and three crew.
- September 29 – Nusantara Buana Air Flight 823, a CASA C-212 Aviocar, crashed in Indonesia during a domestic flight from Medan to Kutacane. All 18 passengers and crew were killed.
- October 4 – Air Tindi Flight 200, a Cessna 208 flying from Yellowknife, crashed on approach to Łutselk'e. Two of the four people on board were killed.
- October 13 – Airlines PNG Flight 1600, a de Havilland Canada DHC-8, crashed near the mouth of the Gogol River, Papua New Guinea, killing 28 of 32 on board.
- October 14 – A Cessna 208 Grand Caravan crashed shortly after taking off from Xakanaka Airstrip, Botswana. The pilot and seven passengers were killed, with four passengers surviving the crash.
- October 18 – Iran Air Flight 742, a Boeing 727 en route from Moscow, Russia, to Tehran, Iran, landed without a nose gear at Mehrabad International Airport; all 94 passengers and 14 crew members survived uninjured.
- November 1 – LOT Polish Airlines Flight 16, a Boeing 767, performed a belly landing at Warsaw Chopin Airport after its landing gear failed to deploy; all 220 passengers and 11 crew members survived uninjured.
- December 28 – Kyrgyzstan Air Company Flight 3, a Tupolev Tu-134, lost a wing and caught fire on landing at Osh. All 88 people on board survived.

=== 2012 ===
- March 27 – On JetBlue Flight 191, an Airbus A320, the captain suffered a mental breakdown and started behaving erratically. The plane landed safely in Amarillo, Texas, 20 minutes after the incident. None of the 135 occupants were injured.

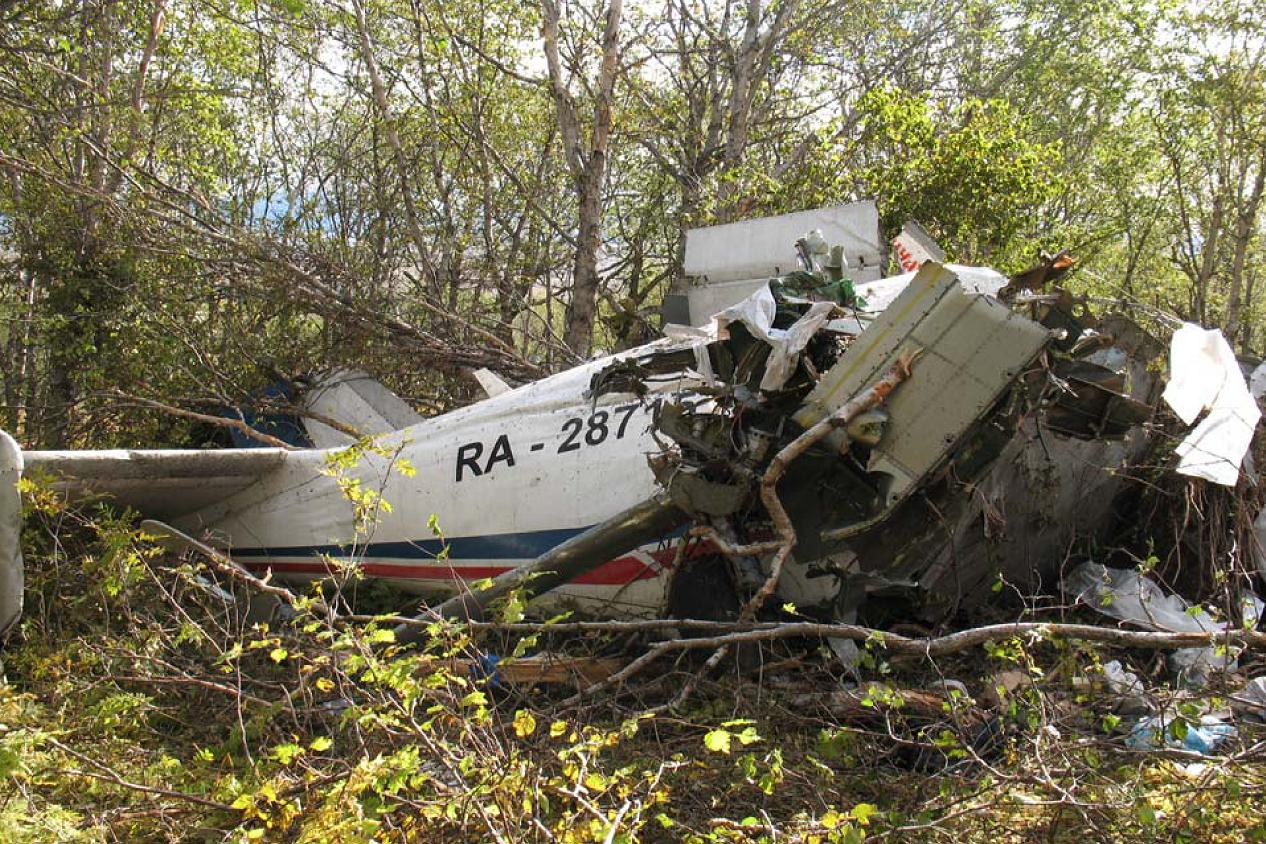
Wreckage of Petropavlovsk-Kamchatsky Air Flight 251

- April 2 – UTair Flight 120, an ATR-72, crashed shortly after takeoff from Roshchino International Airport, Tyumen, Russia, killing 31 of the 43 passengers and crew.
- April 20 – Bhoja Air Flight 213, a Boeing 737, crashed near Chaklala Airbase, Rawalpindi, Pakistan, in bad weather, killing all 127 people on board.
- May 9 – A Sukhoi Superjet 100 crashed into Mount Salak, Indonesia, during an exhibition flight, killing all 45 passengers and crew.
- May 14 – Agni Air Flight CHT crashed near Jomsom Airport, Nepal, during a go-around; of the 21 on board, six survived.
- June 2 – Allied Air Flight 111, a Boeing 727, overran the runway on landing at Kotoka International Airport, Accra, Ghana, and crashed through the airport's perimeter fence; the aircraft then hit a minibus. All four crew members survived but 10 on the ground were killed.
- June 3 – Dana Air Flight 0992, a McDonnell Douglas MD-83 carrying 147 passengers and six crew, crashed in a suburb of Lagos, Nigeria, on approach to Murtala Muhammed International Airport, killing all on board and six more people on the ground.
- June 6 – An Air Class Líneas Aéreas Fairchild Metroliner, operating a flight on behalf of DHL from Montevideo to Buenos Aires, crashed into the Río de la Plata. Both crew members on board were killed.
- June 29 – Six people attempted to hijack Tianjin Airlines Flight 7554, an Embraer E-190, 10 minutes after takeoff from Hotan, China; passengers and crew were able to restrain the hijackers until the aircraft made an emergency landing. Of the 101 on board, two hijackers died and 11 passengers and crew were injured; this was China's first serious hijacking attempt since the Guangzhou Baiyun Airport collisions in 1990.
- August 19 – An Alfa Airlines Antonov An-24-100 crashed in the Nuba mountain range near Talodi, Sudan, on approach to Talodi Airstrip, killing all 32 people on board.
- August 23 – A hot air balloon on a sightseeing flight crashed on the Ljubljana Marsh in Slovenia, killing six of the 32 people on board.
- September 12 – Petropavlovsk-Kamchatsky Air Flight 251, an Antonov An-28, crashed on the Kamchatka Peninsula, Russia, killing 10 of the 14 passengers and crew.
- September 28 – Sita Air Flight 601, a Dornier Do 228, crashed on the bank of the Manohara River, Kathmandu, Nepal, following a bird strike, killing all 19 on board.
- October 7 – FlyMontserrat Flight 107, a Britten-Norman BN-2 Islander, crashed shortly after takeoff from V.C. Bird International Airport in Antigua, killing three of the four occupants.
- November 30 – An Aéro-Service Ilyushin Il-76 crashed short of the runway on approach to Maya–Maya Airport, Brazzaville, Republic of Congo, in bad weather, killing all six occupants, 26 on the ground, and injuring another 14.
- December 17 – An Amazon Sky An-26 crashed into steep terrain in Peru, killing the four crew.
- December 21 – Nizhnevartovskavia Flight 544, a Mil Mi-8, was shot down near Likuangole, Sudan. All four people on board were killed.
- December 25 – Air Bagan Flight 011, a Fokker 100, crash-landed on a road near Heho Airport, Myanmar, killing one on board and one on the ground, while injuring another 11.
- December 29 – Red Wings Airlines Flight 9268, a Tupolev Tu-204 on a re-positioning flight, overran the runway on landing at Vnukovo International Airport, Moscow, subsequently breaking apart and catching fire; five of the eight crew were killed in the first fatal accident involving the Tu-204.

=== 2013 ===
- January 4 – A Transaereo 5074 BN-2 Islander crashed en route from Los Roques to Caracas, Venezuela, killing all six people on board.
- January 23 – A Kenn Borek Air de Havilland Canada DHC-6 crashed on mount Elizabeth, Antarctica, while flying from the Amundsen-Scott station to the Zucchelli station. All three crew members on board were killed.
- January 29 – SCAT Airlines Flight 760, a Bombardier CRJ200, crashed in thick fog on approach to Almaty International Airport, Kazakhstan, killing all 21 passengers and crew.
- February 11 – Pakistan International Airlines Flight 259, a Boeing 737-33A, slid to the left of the runway due to the collapse of the left main gear. All 114 on board survived.
- February 13 – South Airlines Flight 8971, an Antonov An-24, crash-landed in dense fog at Donetsk International Airport, Ukraine, killing five of the 52 people on board.
- March 4 – A Compagnie Africaine d'Aviation Fokker 50 crashed in poor weather conditions on approach to Goma International Airport, Democratic Republic of the Congo, killing all five crew and one of the four passengers.
- March 8 – ACE Air Cargo Flight 51, a Beechcraft 1900C-1, crashed into a mountain whilst on approach to Dillingham Municipal Airport, Alaska. Both crew members were killed.

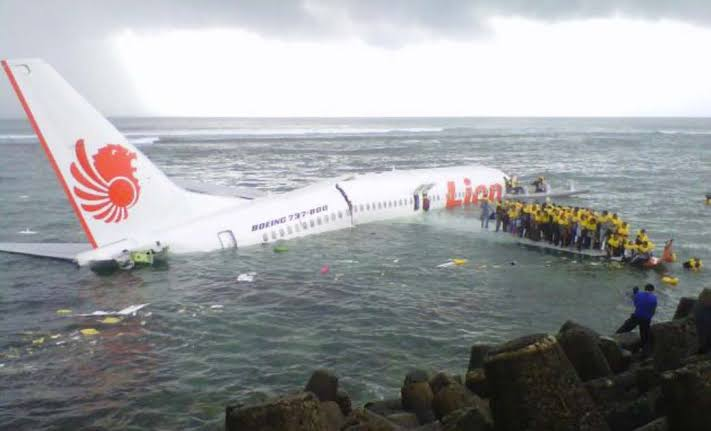
Wreckage of Lion Air Flight 904

- April 7 – A Helicópteros del Pacifico Mil Mi-8 helicopter crashed near Loreto, after breaking up in mid air. All 13 people on board were killed.
- April 13 – Lion Air Flight 904, a Boeing 737-800 carrying 101 passengers and seven crew members, crashed into the ocean while attempting to land at Ngurah Rai International Airport on the Indonesian island of Bali, injuring 46 people on board.
- April 29 – National Airlines Flight 102, a Boeing 747-400 freighter, stalled and crashed shortly after takeoff from Bagram Airfield, Afghanistan, because of load shifting, killing all seven crew members.
- May 16 – Nepal Airlines Flight 555, a de Havilland Canada DHC-6, overran the runway on landing at Jomsom Airport, Nepal, injuring seven people.

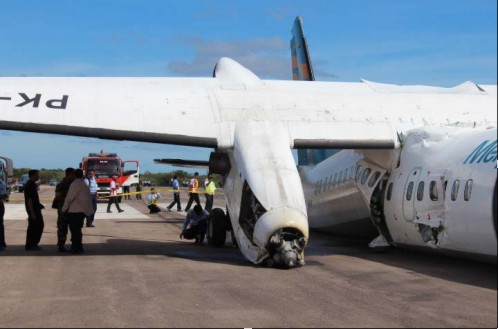
Merpati Nusantara Airlines Flight 6517

- June 10 – Merpati Nusantara Airlines Flight 6517, a Xian MA60, crashed on landing at El Tari Airport, Indonesia, injuring five people on board.

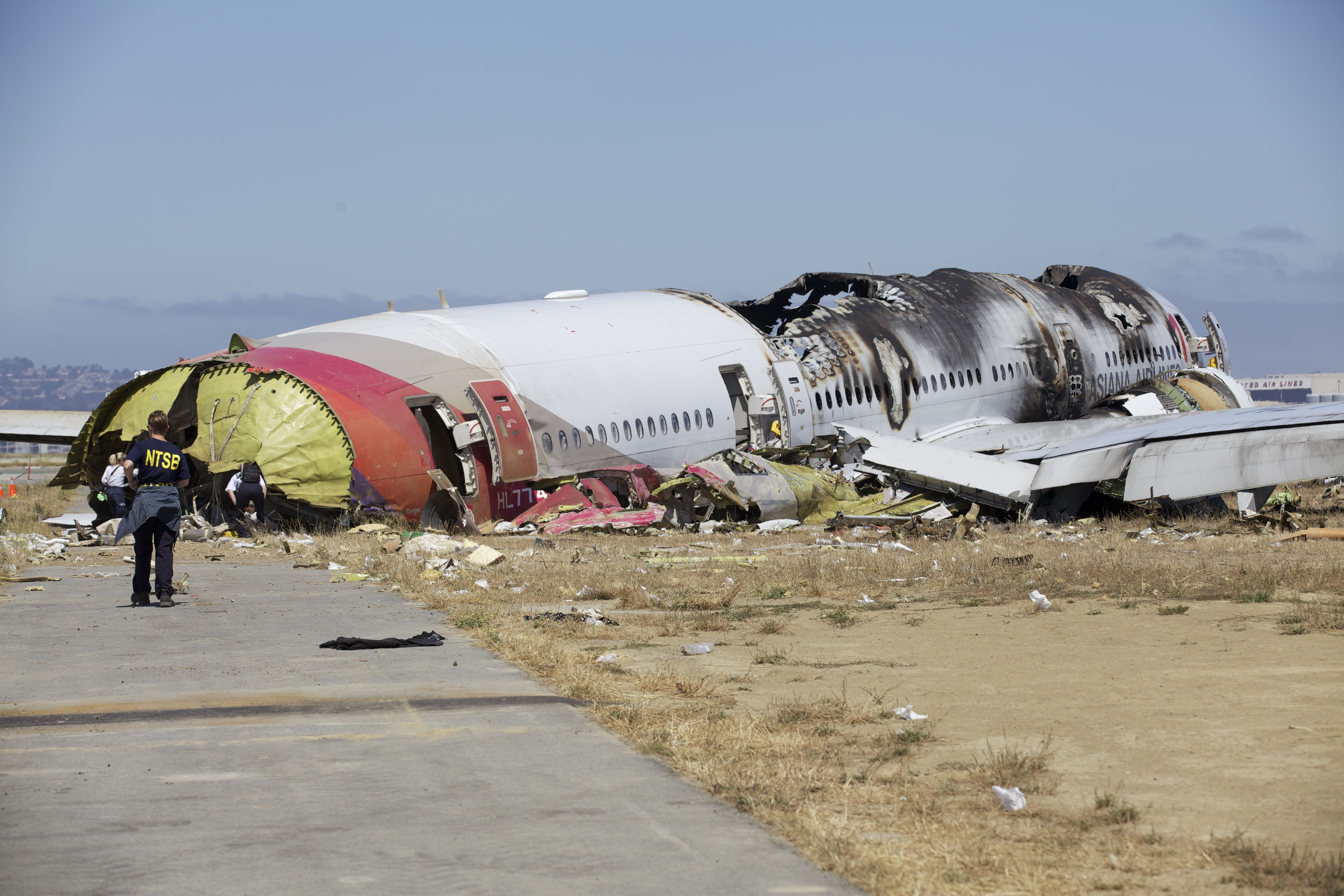
NTSB investigators looking at the fuselage of Asiana Airlines Flight 214 after it crash-landed in San Francisco (July 2013)

- July 3 – Polar Airlines Flight 9949, a Mil Mi-8 helicopter, crashed near Deputatsky in the Sakha Republic in Russia; 24 of the 28 people on board were killed.
- July 6 – Asiana Airlines Flight 214, a Boeing 777-200ER, crashed short of the runway on landing at San Francisco International Airport, killing three of the 307 occupants and injuring 182. The crash was the first fatal accident involving the Boeing 777.
- July 7 – A Rediske Air DHC-3 crashed on takeoff from Soldotna Airport, Alaska, killing all 10 people on board.

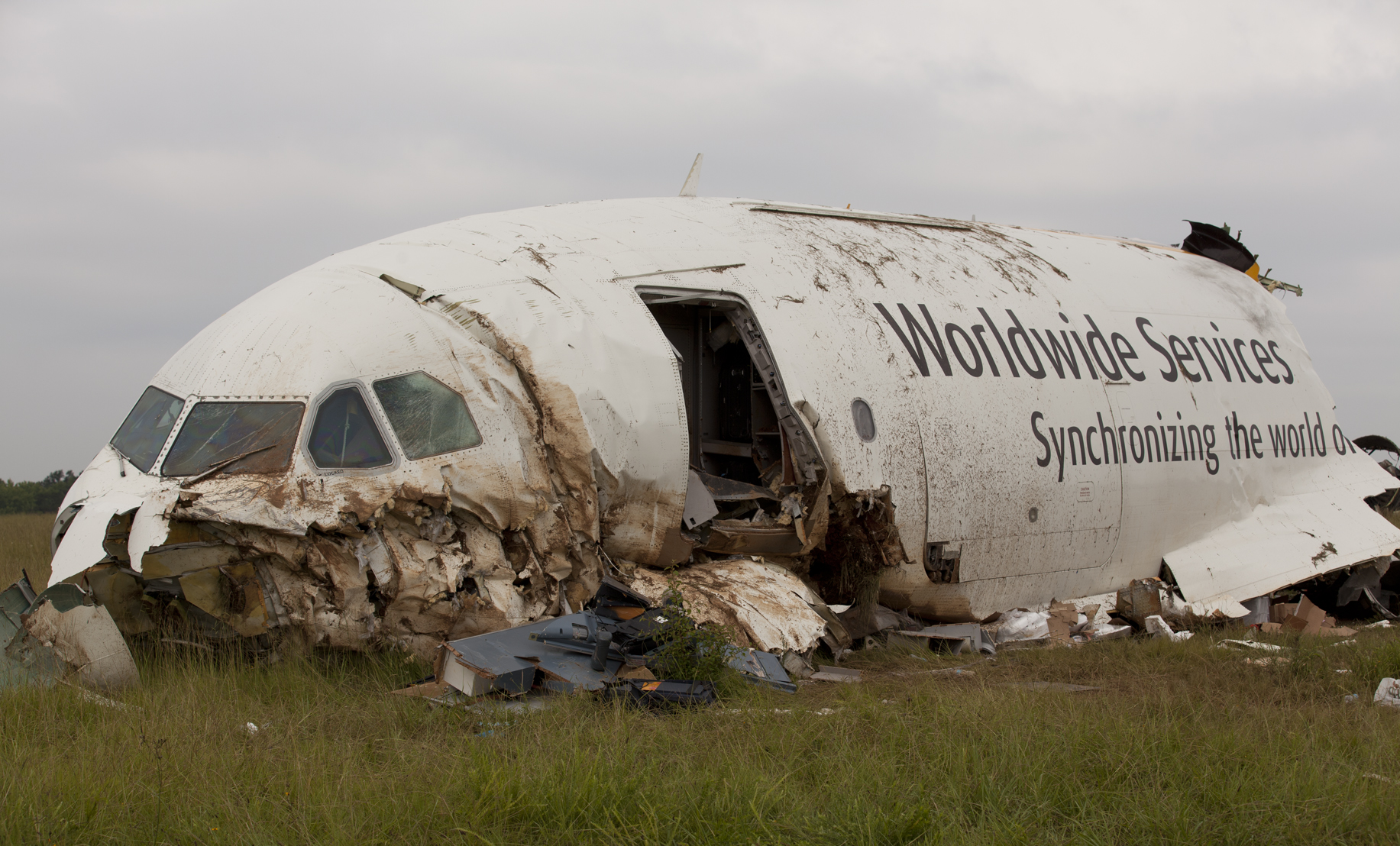
Wreckage of UPS Airlines Flight 1354

- July 22 – Southwest Airlines Flight 345, a Boeing 737-700, suffered a landing gear collapse while landing at LaGuardia Airport in New York, injuring nine of the 150 occupants. The aircraft was written off.
- August 14 – UPS Airlines Flight 1354, an Airbus A300 freighter, crashed short of the runway on approach to Birmingham–Shuttlesworth International Airport, Alabama, killing both pilots.
- August 23 – CHC Scotia Flight 23R, a Eurocopter AS332 Super Puma carrying workers to the Borgsten Dolphin drilling rig, crashed into the North Sea, killing four of the 18 on board.
- October 3 – Associated Aviation Flight 361, an Embraer 120, crashed shortly after takeoff from Murtala Muhammed International Airport in Lagos, Nigeria, killing 16 of the 20 people on board.
- October 10 – MASwings Flight 3002, a de Havilland Canada DHC-6 arriving from Kota Kinabalu, crashed on landing at Kudat, Malaysia. Two of the 16 people on board were killed.
- October 16 – Lao Airlines Flight 301, an ATR-72, crashed shortly before landing at Pakse International Airport, Laos, in adverse weather conditions, killing all 49 occupants.
- November 3 – Aerocon Flight 25, a Fairchild Metro III operating a domestic flight in Bolivia, crashed on landing at Riberalta. Eight of the 18 people on board were killed.
- November 10 – Bearskin Airlines Flight 311, a Swearingen Metro III flying from Sioux Lookout, crashed on approach to Red Lake, Canada, because of an engine failure. Five of the seven people on board were killed.
- November 17 – Tatarstan Airlines Flight 363, a Boeing 737, crashed at Kazan International Airport, Russia, during a go-around, killing all 50 people on board.
- November 29 – LAM Mozambique Airlines Flight 470, an Embraer E190 en route from Maputo International Airport, Mozambique, to Quatro de Fevereiro Airport, Angola, was deliberately crashed by the captain in Bwabwata National Park in northern Namibia, killing all 33 people on board.
- December 11 – A Makani Kai Air Cessna 208 ditches into the Pacific Ocean following an engine failure near Kalaupapa, Hawaii, killing one of the 10 occupants on board.
- December 26 – An Irkut Antonov An-12 on a cargo flight from Novosibirsk crashed into a hangar on approach to Irkutsk, Russia. All nine people on board were killed.

=== 2014 ===
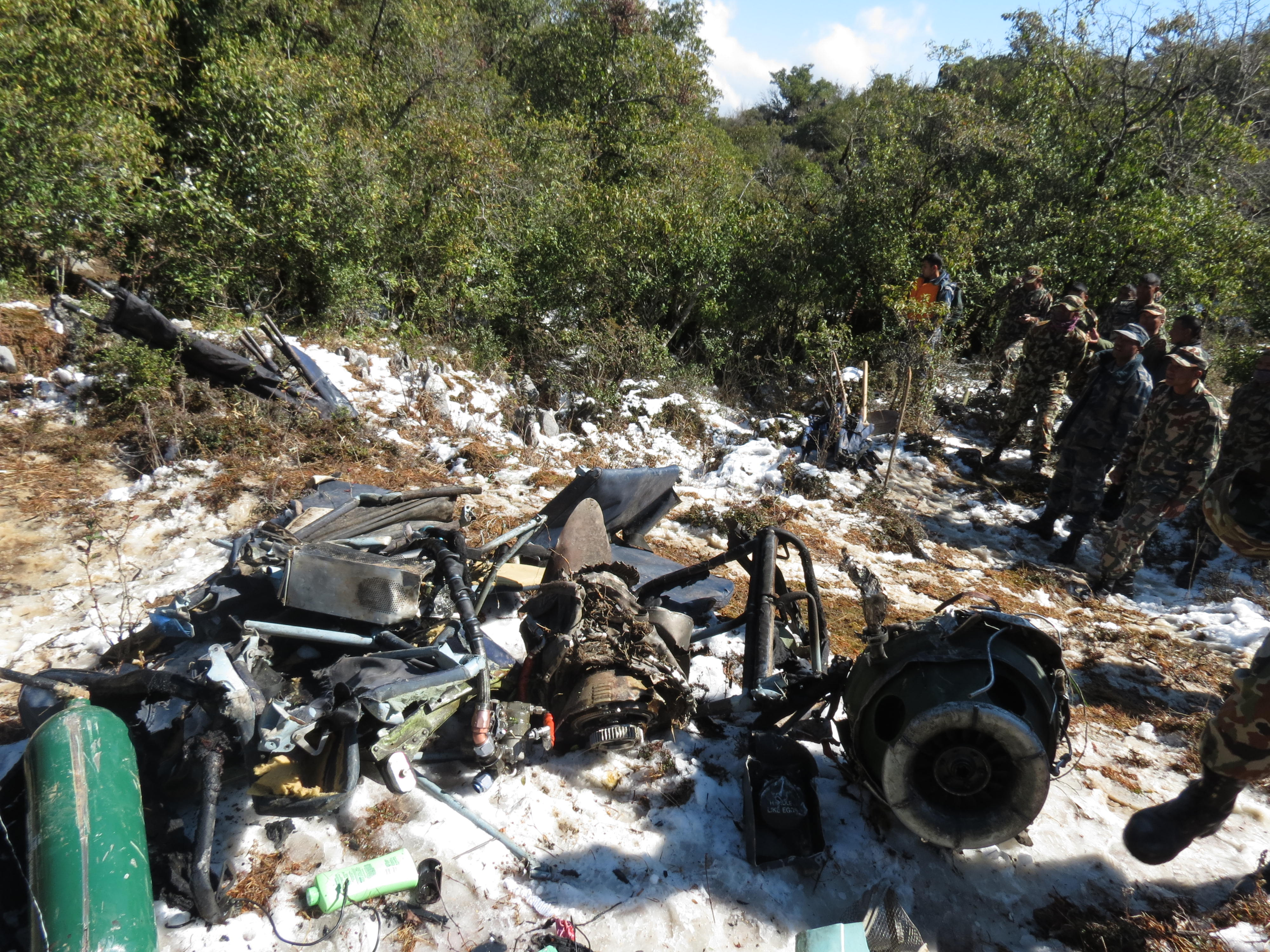
Remains of Nepal Airlines Flight 183

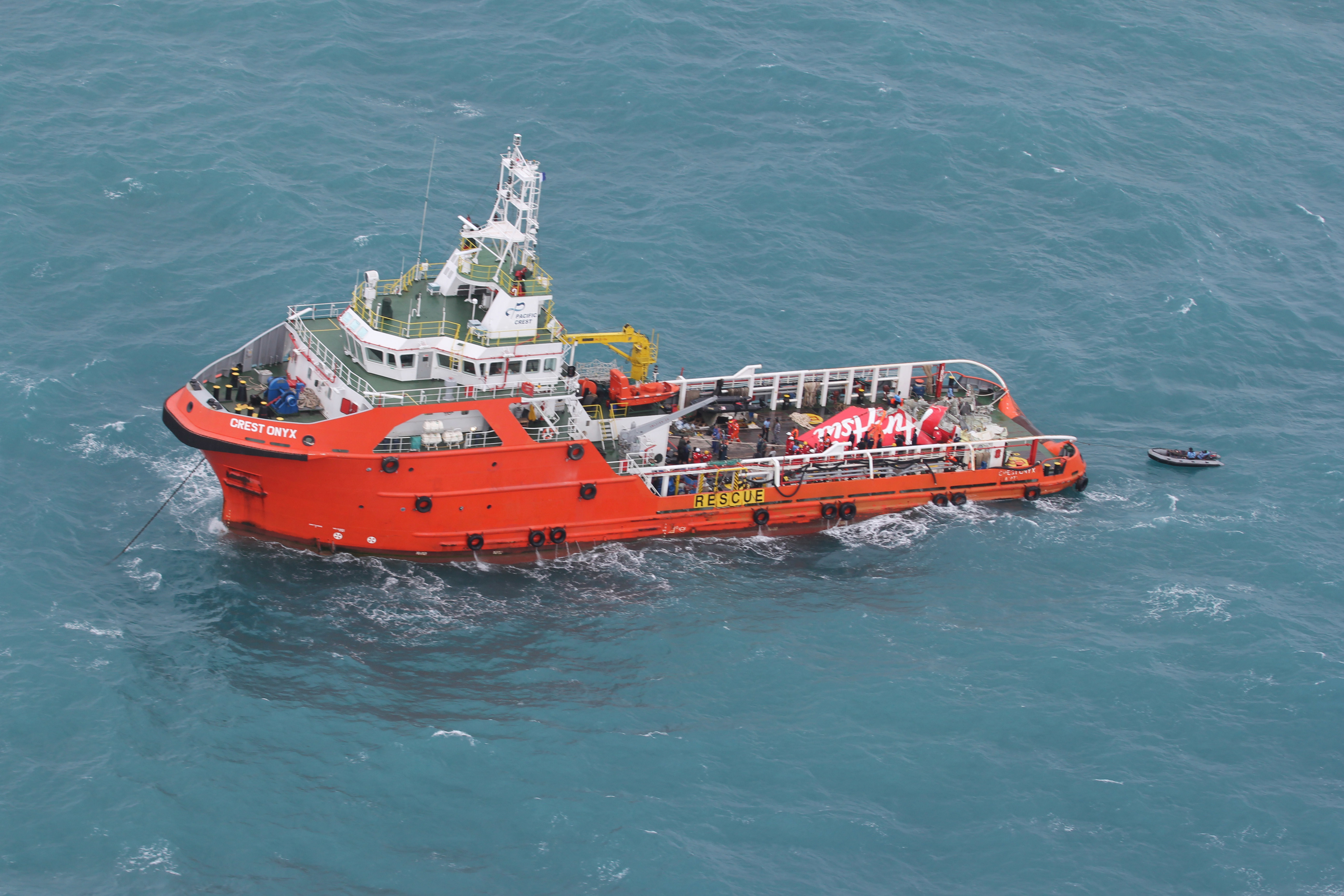
An offshore supply ship with the tail of QZ8501 on its stern, January 10, 2015

- February 16 – Nepal Airlines Flight 183, a de Havilland Canada DHC-6, crashed near Khidim about 74 kilometres southwest of Pokhara, Nepal, killing all 18 people on board.
- February 17 – Ethiopian Airlines Flight 702, a Boeing 767, was hijacked by the co-pilot while en route from Addis Ababa, Ethiopia, to Rome, Italy, but landed safely at Geneva, Switzerland. All 202 passengers and crew were unharmed.
- March 8 – Malaysia Airlines Flight 370, a Boeing 777-200ER en route from Kuala Lumpur to Beijing with 227 passengers and 12 crew on board, disappeared from radar over the Gulf of Thailand. A wing part was later found in Réunion. The main wreckage of the plane was never located. All 239 people on board were presumed dead.
- June 24 – Gunmen fired bullets at Pakistan International Airlines Flight 756, an Airbus A310-300, during its descent towards Peshawar, Pakistan. Among the 190 people on board one passenger was killed and two flight attendants were injured.
- July 17 – Malaysia Airlines Flight 17, a Boeing 777 en route from Amsterdam to Kuala Lumpur, was shot down over eastern Ukraine. All 283 passengers and 15 crew died in the deadliest shooting-down of an airliner to date.
- July 23 – TransAsia Airways Flight 222, an ATR-72 en route from Kaohsiung to Penghu, Taiwan, crashed whilst executing a go-around, killing 48 of the 58 people on board.
- July 24 – Air Algérie Flight 5017, a chartered Swiftair McDonnell Douglas MD-83 operating for Air Algérie en route from Burkina Faso to Algiers, crashed in the northern Mali desert after disappearing from radar around 50 minutes after takeoff, killing all 110 passengers and six crew members.
- August 10 – Sepahan Airlines Flight 5915, a HESA IrAn-140 (an Antonov An-140 built under licence), crashed shortly after takeoff from Mehrabad International Airport, Iran, killing 40 of the 48 people on board.
- October 29 – Skyway Enterprises Flight 7101, a Short 360, lost control during the heading change and crashed into the sea just shortly after takeoff, killing the two pilots on board.
- December 14 – Loganair Flight 6780, a Saab 2000, nosedived after a lightning strike. The crew made a safe emergency landing back at Aberdeen. All 33 passengers and crew were unharmed.
- December 28 – Indonesia AirAsia Flight 8501, an Airbus A320 en route from Surabaya, Indonesia, to Singapore, crashed into the Java Sea near Kalimantan, Borneo, killing all 155 passengers and seven crew.

=== 2015 ===
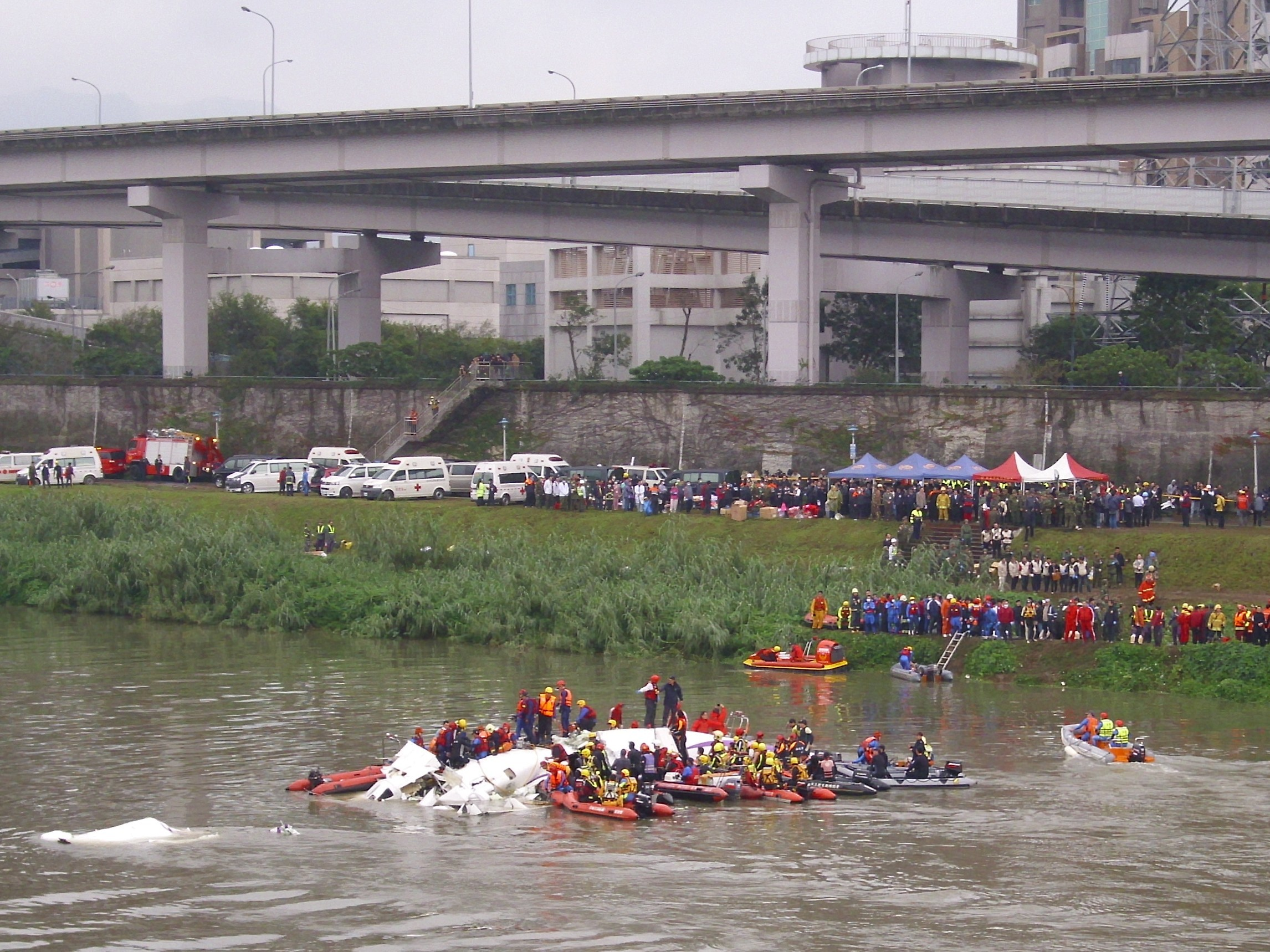
TransAsia Airways Flight 235

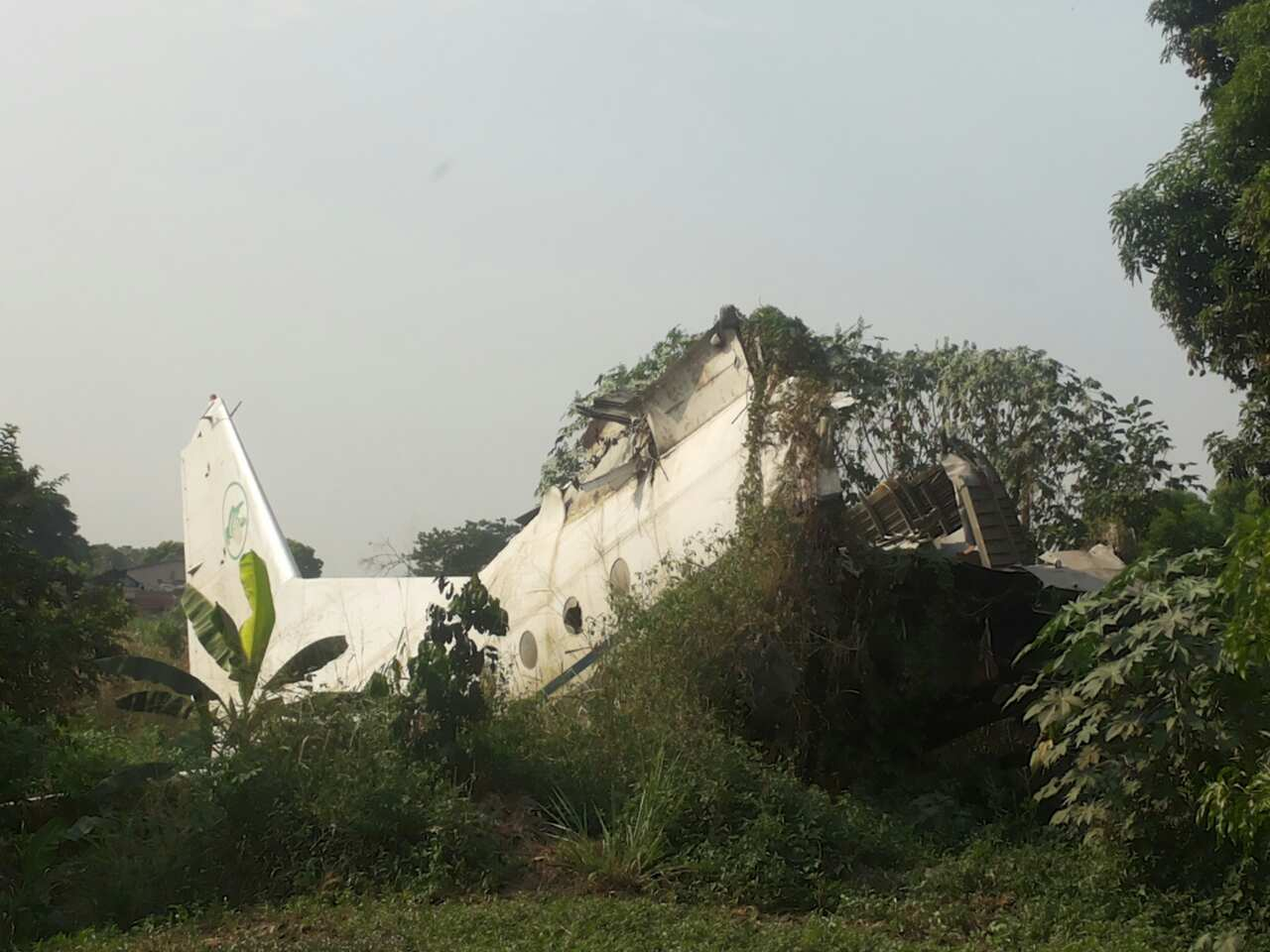
2015 Juba An-12 crash, one year after the crash

- January 20 – Olimp Air Flight 4653, an Antonov An-2P, crashed on approach to the Shatyrkul mine in Kazakhstan. Six of the seven people on board were killed.
- February 4 – TransAsia Airways Flight 235, an ATR-72, stalled on takeoff and crashed into the Keelung River in Taiwan after striking the Huandong Viaduct and a passing taxi; 43 of the 58 passengers and crew were killed and two people on the ground were injured.
- March 5 – Delta Air Lines Flight 1086, a McDonnell Douglas MD-88, skidded off the runway at LaGuardia Airport in New York, crashed into a fence, then came to rest on the edge of Flushing Bay. Several people were injured, but there were no deaths.
- March 24 – Germanwings Flight 9525, an Airbus A320, crashed in southern France en route from Barcelona, Spain, to Düsseldorf, Germany, as a result of a deliberate act by the first officer. All 144 passengers and six crew were killed.
- March 29 – Air Canada Flight 624, an Airbus A320, crashed short of the runway and hit power lines while landing at Stanfield International Airport in Halifax, Nova Scotia, Canada, en route from Toronto. All 138 passengers and crew survived, with 23 treated for minor injuries.
- April 13 – Carson Air Flight 66, a Swearingen Metro II, crashed into a mountain en route to Prince George Airport, British Columbia, Canada. Both crew members were killed.
- April 14 – Asiana Airlines Flight 162, an Airbus A320, crashed short of the runway and hit a localizer while landing at Hiroshima Airport, Japan, en route from Seoul, South Korea. All 82 passengers and crew survived, but 27 were injured.
- August 16 – Trigana Air Service Flight 267, an ATR-42, crashed while en route from Sentani Airport to Oskibil Airport in the eastern Indonesian province of Papua. All 49 passengers and five crew members were killed in the crash in the worst aviation accident ever involving the ATR-42.
- September 5 – In the 2015 Senegal mid-air collision, a Boeing 737-800 flying over eastern Senegal collided with a BAe 125 air ambulance operated by Senegalair. The BAe 125 crashed in the Atlantic Ocean, killing all seven on board, while the 737 landed safely without any injuries to those on board.
- September 8 – British Airways Flight 2276, a Boeing 777-200ER, aborted takeoff at McCarran International Airport, Las Vegas, following an engine fire. All 170 passengers and crew were evacuated safely.
- October 2 – Aviastar Flight 7503, a DHC-6 Twin Otter, crashed on a mountain near Palopo, Indonesia, 11 minutes after takeoff, killing all 10 passengers and crew.
- October 29 – Dynamic Airways Flight 405, a Boeing 767-200ER, caught fire while preparing for takeoff at Fort Lauderdale-Hollywood International Airport. All 101 passengers and crew survived, but 21 people were injured.
- October 31 – Metrojet Flight 9268, an Airbus A321, broke up in mid-air over the Sinai Peninsula after a terrorist bomb exploded on board, 23 minutes after takeoff from Sharm-El-Sheikh. All 224 passengers and crew were killed.
- November 4 – In the 2015 Juba An-12 crash, an Antonov An-12 crashed near the White Nile shortly after takeoff from Juba International Airport in South Sudan, killing 38 of 39 on board.
- November 22 – Avia Traffic Company Flight 768, a Boeing 737-300, made a hard landing and skidded off the runway at Osh Airport in Kyrgyzstan, injuring 14 people on board.

=== 2016 ===
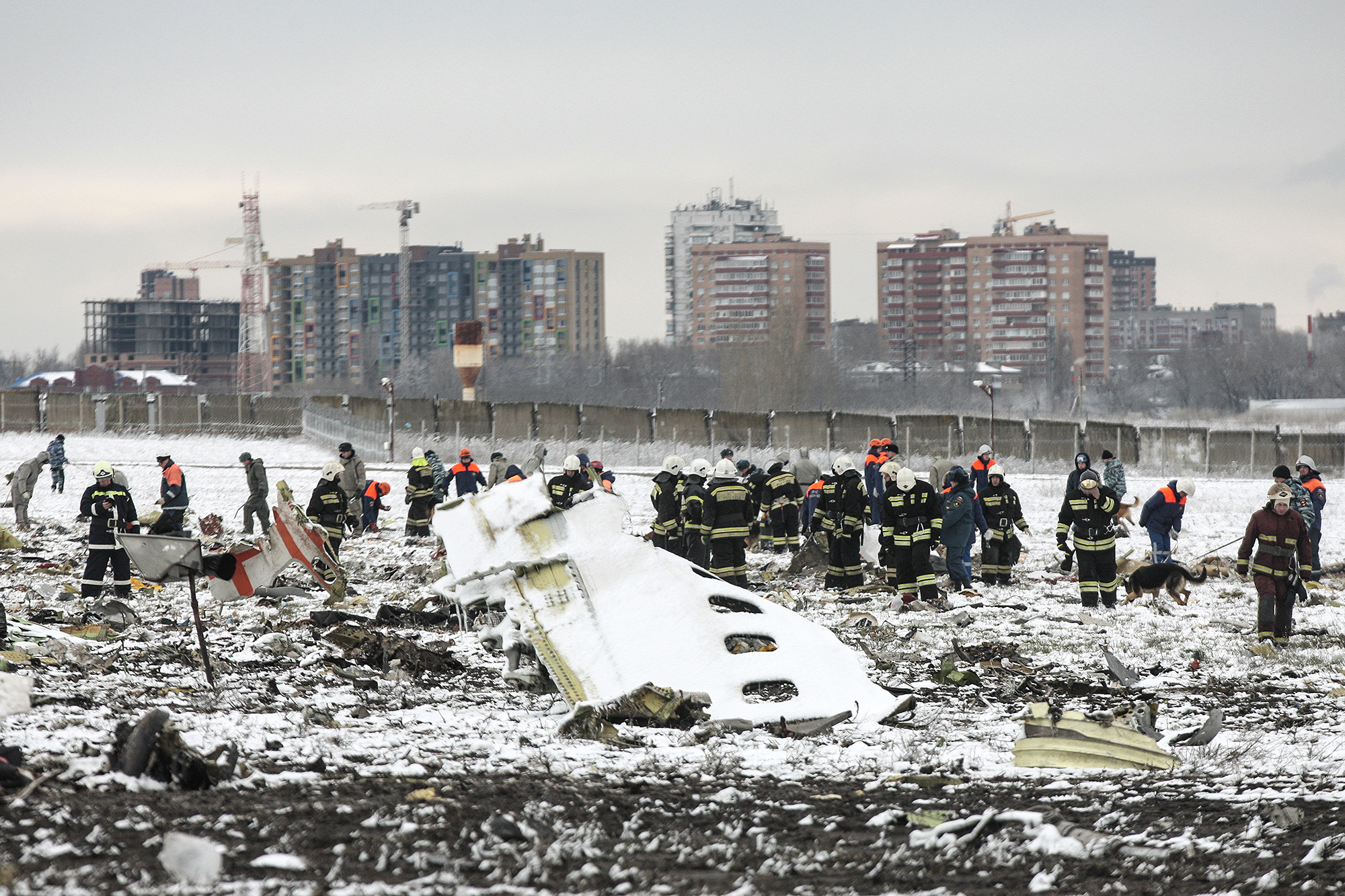
Wreckage of Flydubai Flight 981 on Runway 22 at Rostov-on-don Airport

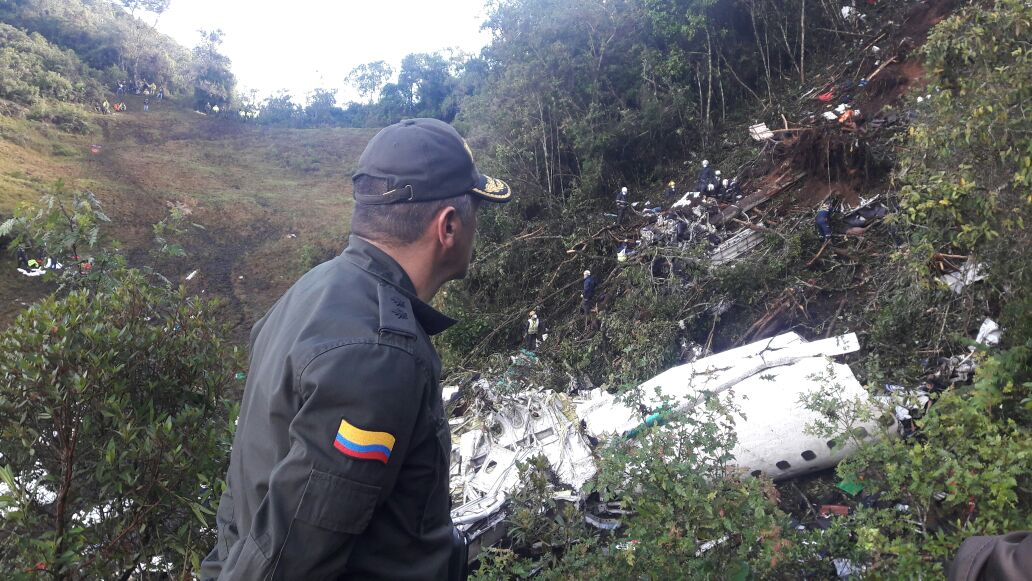
Wreckage of LaMia Flight 2933

- January 8 – West Air Sweden Flight 294, a Bombardier CRJ200 cargo freighter, crashed near Akkajaure in Sweden; both crew members were killed.
- February 2 – Daallo Airlines Flight 159, an Airbus A321, suffered an explosion shortly after taking off from Aden Adde International Airport, Somalia; two people were injured and one, the suspected suicide bomber, was killed after falling from the aircraft.
- February 24 – Tara Air Flight 193, a DHC-6 Twin Otter, flew into a storm and crashed into a mountainside at Dana, Myagdi district, Nepal, killing all 23 on board.
- February 26 – In the 2016 Air Kasthamandap crash, an Air Kasthamandap PAC 750XL crash-landed in Nepal, killing the two crew members and injuring nine passengers.
- March 9 – True Aviation Flight 21, an Antonov An-26, crashed into the sea whilst trying to return to Cox's Bazar Airport, Bangladesh, after an engine failure, killing three of the four crew on board.
- March 19 – Flydubai Flight 981, a Boeing 737-800, crashed while landing at Rostov-on-Don, Russia, in poor weather, killing all 62 people on board.
- March 29 – EgyptAir Flight 181, an Airbus A320, was hijacked and forcibly diverted to Larnaca International Airport, Cyprus; all passengers and crew were released unharmed.
- March 29 – An Aero Teknic Mitsubishi MU-2 crashed near Les Îles-de-la-Madeleine, Canada, after a flight from Montreal. All seven people on board were killed.
- April 4 – Batik Air Flight 7703, a Boeing 737-800, collided with an ATR 42 on the runway at Halim Perdanakusma Airport in Jakarta; both aircraft were substantially damaged, but all 60 occupants of the two aircraft survived.
- April 13 – A Sunbird Aviation Britten-Norman Islander crashed on approach to Kiunga Airport in the Western Province of Papua New Guinea, while operating a non-scheduled domestic charter flight, killing all 12 on board.
- April 29 – In the 2016 Turøy helicopter crash, a Eurocopter EC225L Super Puma helicopter crashed near Turøy, an island off the coast of Norway; all 13 passengers and crew were killed.
- May 18 – A Silk Way Airlines Antonov An-12 cargo plane crashed after overrunning the runway on takeoff from Dwyer Airport in Afghanistan. The crash, caused by an engine failure, killed seven and injured two.
- May 19 – EgyptAir Flight 804, an Airbus A320, crashed into the eastern Mediterranean Sea after a series of sharp descending turns; all 56 passengers and 10 crew were killed.
- May 27 – Korean Air Flight 2708, a Boeing 777-300, suffered an engine failure and resulting fire while taxiing for takeoff at Haneda Airport, Tokyo; all 319 passengers and crew were evacuated, although 12 were injured.
- July 20 – Joy General Aviation Flight 6005, a Cessna 208B Caravan, crashed into a bridge in Shanghai, China after take off; 5 of the 10 occupants were killed.
- August 3 – Emirates Flight 521, a Boeing 777-300, landed wheels-up at Dubai International Airport, then caught fire; all 300 passengers and crew escaped unharmed, but one firefighter was killed.
- August 5 – ASL Airlines Hungary Flight 7332, a Boeing 737, overran the runway on landing at Orio al Serio International Airport in Bergamo, Italy; both pilots survived.
- August 27 – Southwest Airlines Flight 3472, a Boeing 737, suffered an uncontained engine failure over the Gulf of Mexico, causing substantial damage to the aircraft and loss of cabin pressure; the aircraft landed safely at Pensacola International Airport, Florida, with no injuries among the 104 on board.
- October 21 – Skol Airlines Flight 9375, a Mil Mi-8 helicopter carrying workers to the Suzumoskoye oil field, crashed on the Yamal Peninsula in Russia, killing 19 of the 22 people on board.
- October 28 – American Airlines Flight 383, a Boeing 767-300ER, suffered an uncontained engine failure and fire at Chicago O'Hare Airport; 20 of the 170 people on board were injured.
- October 28 – FedEx Express Flight 910, a McDonnell Douglas MD-10-10F, skidded off the runway after the landing gear collapsed on landing at Fort Lauderdale-Hollywood International Airport; the left wing was severely damaged in a post-crash fire but both pilots survived.
- October 31 – In the 2016 Alfa Indonesia DHC-4 crash, a DHC-4T Turbo Caribou operating a cargo flight to Ilaga Airport, Indonesia, crashed in the Ilaga Pass; all four crew members were killed.
- November 28 – LaMia Flight 2933, an Avro RJ85, crashed at Cerro Gordo en route to Medellín, Colombia, whilst carrying the Brazilian football team Chapecoense; all but six of the 77 passengers and crew died.
- December 7 – Pakistan International Airlines Flight 661, an ATR-42-500, crashed at Havelian while en route from Chitral to Islamabad; all 42 passengers and five crew members were killed.
- December 20 – Aerosucre Flight 157, a Boeing 727-200, crashed after failing to take off from Puerto Carreño, Colombia; only one of the six crew members survived.
- December 23 – Afriqiyah Airways Flight 209, an Airbus A320-214 on a domestic flight in Libya, was hijacked and forced to land at Malta Airport; after several hours, all passengers and crew were released and the two hijackers surrendered.

=== 2017 ===
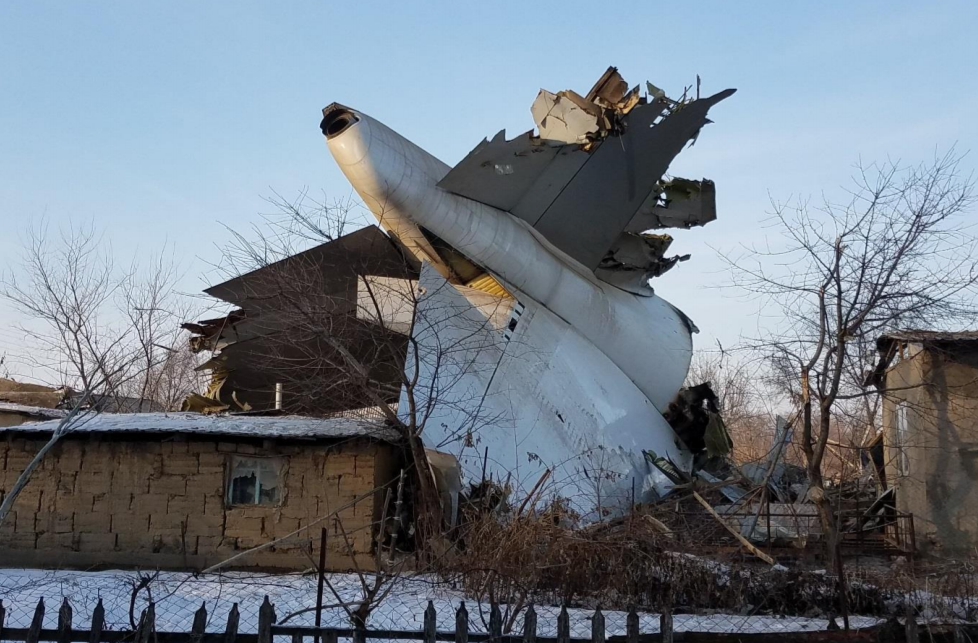
Tail section of Turkish Airlines Flight 6491

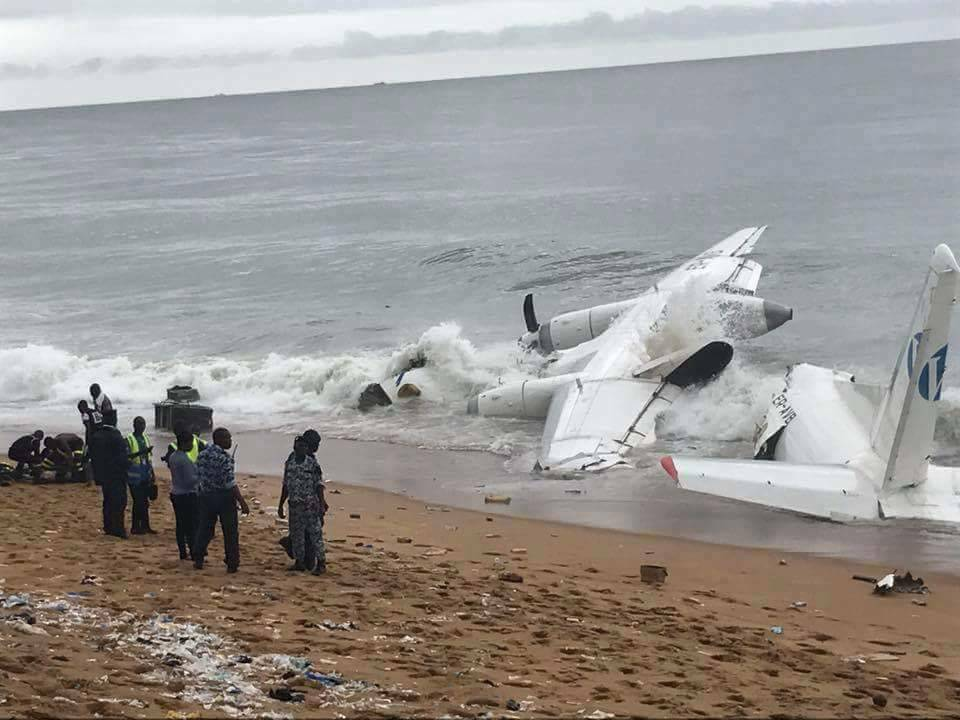
2017 Valan International Antonov An-26 crash

- January 16 – Turkish Airlines Flight 6491, a Boeing 747-400F, crashed in a residential area upon attempting landing in thick fog in Bishkek, Kyrgyzstan. The four crew members and 35 people on the ground were killed.
- March 8 – Ameristar Charters Flight 9363, an MD-83 chartered to fly the Michigan Wolverines men's basketball team to the 2017 Big Ten Men's Basketball Tournament in Washington, D.C., overran the runway on takeoff at Willow Run Airport, Ypsilanti, Michigan, after suffering a jammed elevator. The aircraft was damaged but all 116 on board survived.
- March 28 – Peruvian Airlines Flight 112, a Boeing 737-300, was burnt out following the collapse of the landing gear at Francisco Carle Airport, Jauja. All 150 people on board survived.
- May 5 – Air Cargo Carriers Flight 1260, Shorts 360 arriving from Louisville, crashed on landing at Charleston airport. Both crew members on board were killed.
- May 27 – Goma Air Flight 409, a Let L-410 operating a cargo flight, crashed short of Lukla Airport, Nepal, in poor visibility. Two of the three crew members were killed, one of whom died later in hospital.
- July 7 – Air Canada Flight 759, an Airbus A320 on approach to runway 28R at San Francisco International Airport, nearly landed on a taxiway occupied by four loaded passenger jets. No one was killed or injured.
- July 21 – Thomson Airways Flight 1526, a Boeing 737-800 bound for Corfu, hit runway lights on takeoff from Belfast. All 185 people on board survived.
- September 30 – Air France Flight 66, an Airbus A380, suffered an uncontained engine failure and made an emergency landing at Goose Bay Airport, Newfoundland and Labrador, Canada. No one was killed or injured.
- October 14 – In the 2017 Valan International Antonov An-26 crash, an Antonov An-26 crashed into the sea just short of Félix Houphouët Boigny International Airport, Abidjan, Ivory Coast. Four of the ten occupants were killed.
- October 26 – Convers Avia Flight 312, a Mil Mi-8 helicopter, crashed into Isfjorden fjord on approach to Barentsburg, Norway, after a flight from Pyramiden. All eight people on board were killed.
- November 15 – Khabarovsk Airlines Flight 463, a Let L-410 Turbolet, crashed short of the runway at Nelkan Airport in Russia, killing four of the five passengers and both crew members.
- December 13 – West Wind Aviation Flight 282, an ATR 42-300, crashed shortly after takeoff from Fond-du-Lac Airport, Saskatchewan, Canada. Of the 25 passengers and crew, all initially survived, but one passenger died of his injuries in hospital 12 days later.
- December 31 – Nature Air Flight 144, a Cessna 208 Caravan, crashed shortly after takeoff from Punta Islita Airport, Costa Rica. All 12 passengers and crew were killed.

=== 2018 ===
- January 13 – Pegasus Airlines Flight 8622, a Boeing 737-800, skidded off the end of the runway at Trabzon Airport, Turkey, and came to rest on a cliff. All 168 passengers and crew survived without injury. The aircraft was written off.
- February 11 – Saratov Airlines Flight 703, an Antonov An-148, crashed shortly after taking off from Domodedovo International Airport, Russia. All 71 passengers and crew were killed.
- February 13 – United Airlines Flight 1175, a Boeing 777-200 operating a domestic flight between San Francisco International Airport and Honolulu International Airport, suffered an uncontained engine failure over the Pacific Ocean. A successful emergency landing was made at Honolulu and all 373 passengers and crew survived unharmed.
- February 18 – Iran Aseman Airlines Flight 3704, an ATR 72–200 on a domestic flight in Iran, crashed in the Zagros Mountains, killing all 60 passengers and six crew members.
- March 12 – US-Bangla Airlines Flight 211, a Bombardier Q400 on an international flight from Dhaka, crashed on landing at Tribhuvan International Airport, Nepal; 51 of the 71 people on board were killed.

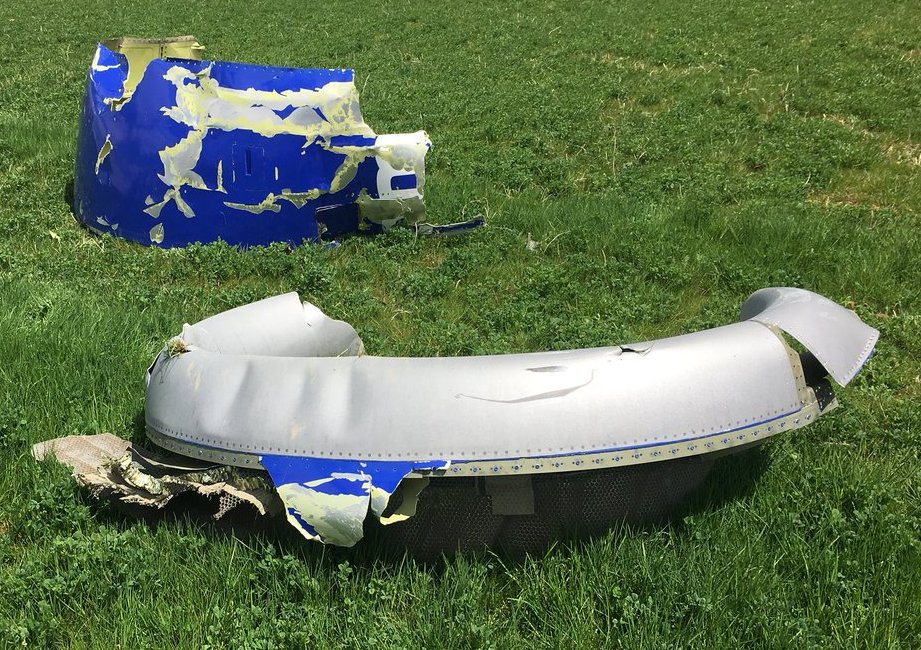
Pieces of the engine cowling from Southwest Airlines Flight 1380.

- April 17 – Southwest Airlines Flight 1380, a Boeing 737-700 en route over Bernville, Pennsylvania, suffered an engine failure at cruise altitude. Some debris entered the fuselage, causing substantial damage to the aircraft and loss of cabin pressure. The crew safely diverted to Philadelphia International Airport. One passenger was killed and another seven were injured.
- May 14 – Sichuan Airlines Flight 8633, an Airbus A319-100, made an emergency landing at Chengdu Shuangliu Airport in China after part of the cockpit windshield failed; all 128 passengers and crew survived the incident.
- May 18 – Cubana de Aviación Flight 972, a Boeing 737-200/Adv, crashed shortly after takeoff from José Martí International Airport, Cuba. Of the 113 passengers and crew, 112 were killed; the sole survivor was seriously injured.
- June 5 – Fly-SAX Flight 102, A Cessna 208B Grand Caravan flying from Kitale to Nairobi, crashed in the Aberdare mountains. All 10 people on board were killed.
- July 10 – A Convair 340 crashed into a factory near Pretoria, South Africa, because of engine failure shortly after takeoff. Two of the 19 occupants died, along with one on the ground.
- July 28 – Air Vanuatu Flight 241, an ATR 72-500, skidded off the runway after a flight from Tanna to Port Villa, Vanuatu; 13 of the 43 people on board suffered minor injuries.
- July 31 – Aeroméxico Connect Flight 2431, an Embraer ERJ-190AR, crashed into wooded terrain shortly after takeoff from Durango International Airport, Mexico. The aircraft was destroyed, but all 99 passengers and four crew survived.
- August 4 – A Ju-Air Junkers Ju 52 crashed near Piz Segnas, Switzerland, killing all 20 on board.
- August 4 – A Utair Mil Mi-8 helicopter crashed on take off from Vankor Field, Russia, After colliding with the external load of another helicopter. All 18 people on board were killed.
- August 10 – In the 2018 Horizon Air Q400 incident, a Horizon Air Bombardier Dash 8 Q400 with no passengers on board was stolen from Seattle–Tacoma International Airport by a non-pilot airline employee and later crashed on Ketron Island, killing him.

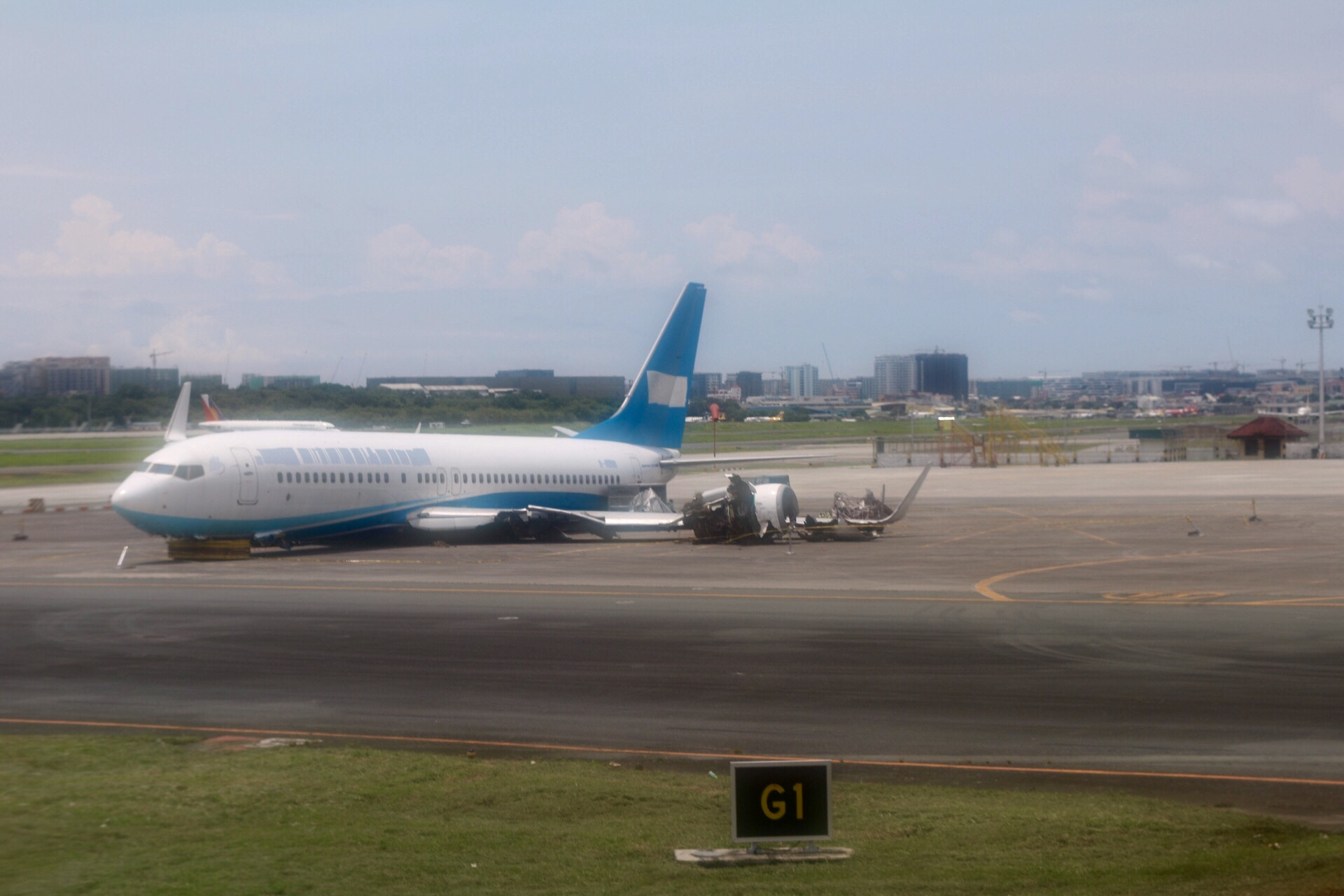
Wreckage of XiamenAir Flight 8667

- August 16 – Xiamen Airlines Flight 8667, a Boeing 737-800, overshot the runway on landing at Ninoy Aquino International Airport, Philippines, in heavy monsoon rains. All 157 passengers and eight crew were unharmed.
- September 1 – UTair Flight 579, a Boeing 737-800, overshot the runway and caught fire while landing at Sochi International Airport in Russia, injuring 18 people. One airport employee died of a heart attack.

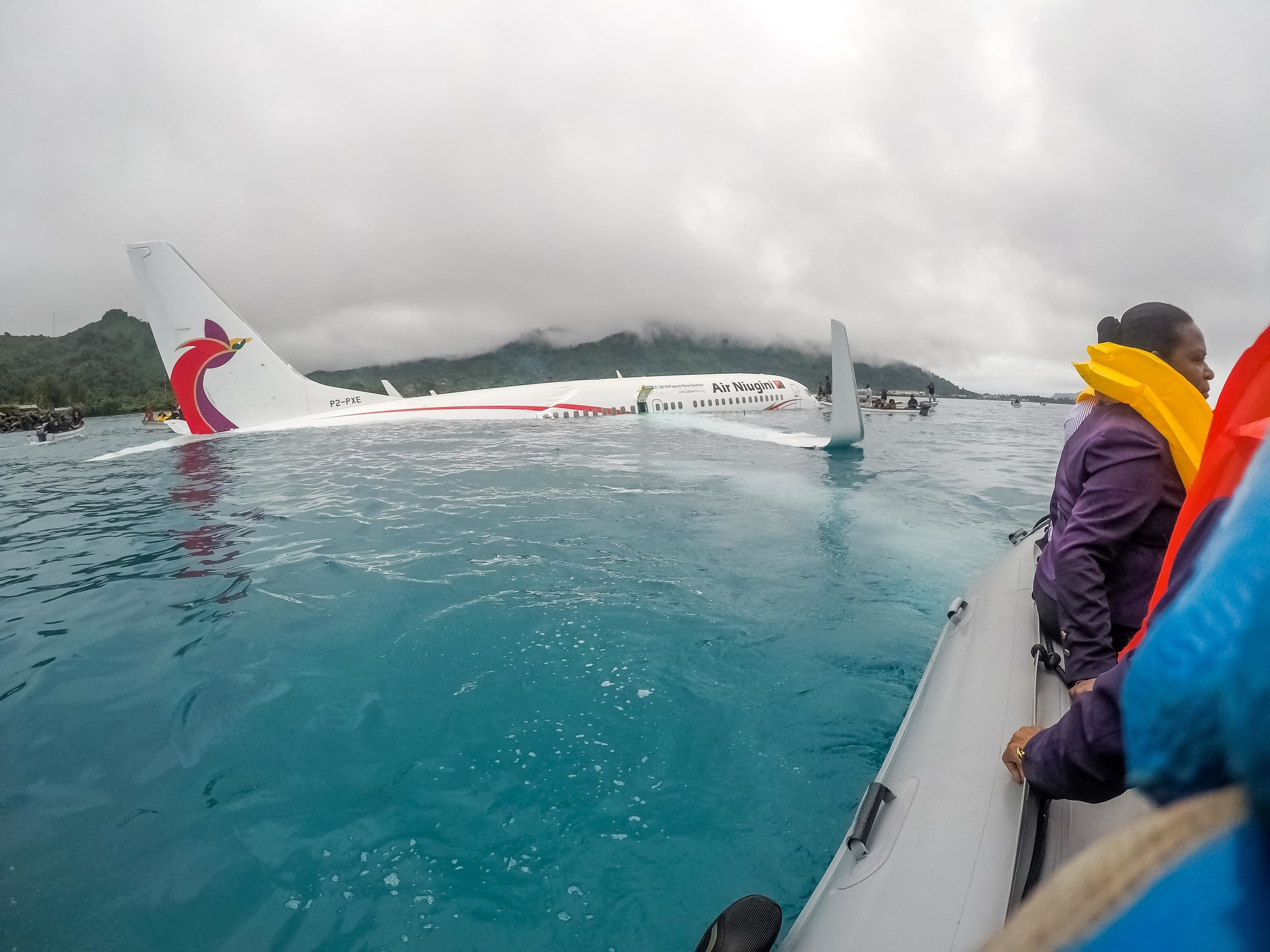
Air Niugini Flight 73

- September 9 – A Let L-410 Turbolet crashed into a lake in Yirol, South Sudan, killing 20 of the 23 passengers and crew.
- September 28 – Air Niugini Flight 73, a Boeing 737-800, landed short of the runway and came to rest in a lagoon at Chuuk International Airport in the Federated States of Micronesia; one passenger died, whilst 34 passengers and 12 crew escaped without serious injuries.
- October 11 – Air India Express Flight 611, a Boeing 737-800, suffered a severe tailstrike and crashed into the antenna. No one of the 136 occupants died and only 1 injured on the ground.
- October 29 – Lion Air Flight 610, a Boeing 737 MAX 8 bound for Pangkal Pinang, Indonesia, crashed into the Java Sea shortly after takeoff from Soekarno–Hatta International Airport in Jakarta, because of a design flaw in the Maneuvering Characteristics Augmentation System (MCAS), an automatic flight stabilization programme. All 181 passengers and eight crew were killed in the worst accident involving the Boeing 737.
- November 7 – Sky Lease Cargo Flight 4854, a Boeing 747-400F, overran the runway while attempting to land at Halifax Stanfield International Airport, Canada. Three crew members were injured.
- November 9 – Fly Jamaica Airways Flight 256, a Boeing 757-200, crash-landed after returning to Cheddi Jagan International Airport, Guyana, after suffering a hydraulic failure 45 minutes after takeoff en route to Toronto. All on board initially survived, but one passenger died a week later from injuries sustained in the crash.
- November 11 – Air Astana Flight 1388, an Embraer ERJ-190, suffered severe control issues shortly after takeoff. It landed safely 90 minutes later at Beja Airbase, Portugal. The aircraft was written off.

=== 2019 ===
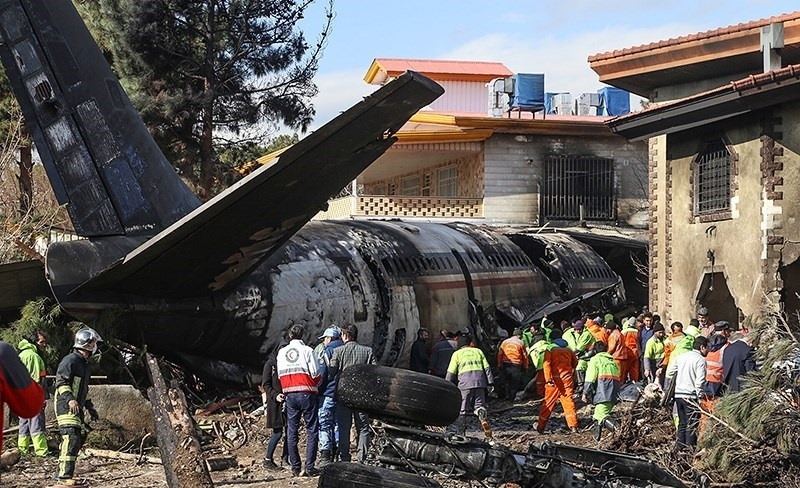
The crash site of the Saha Airlines Boeing 707

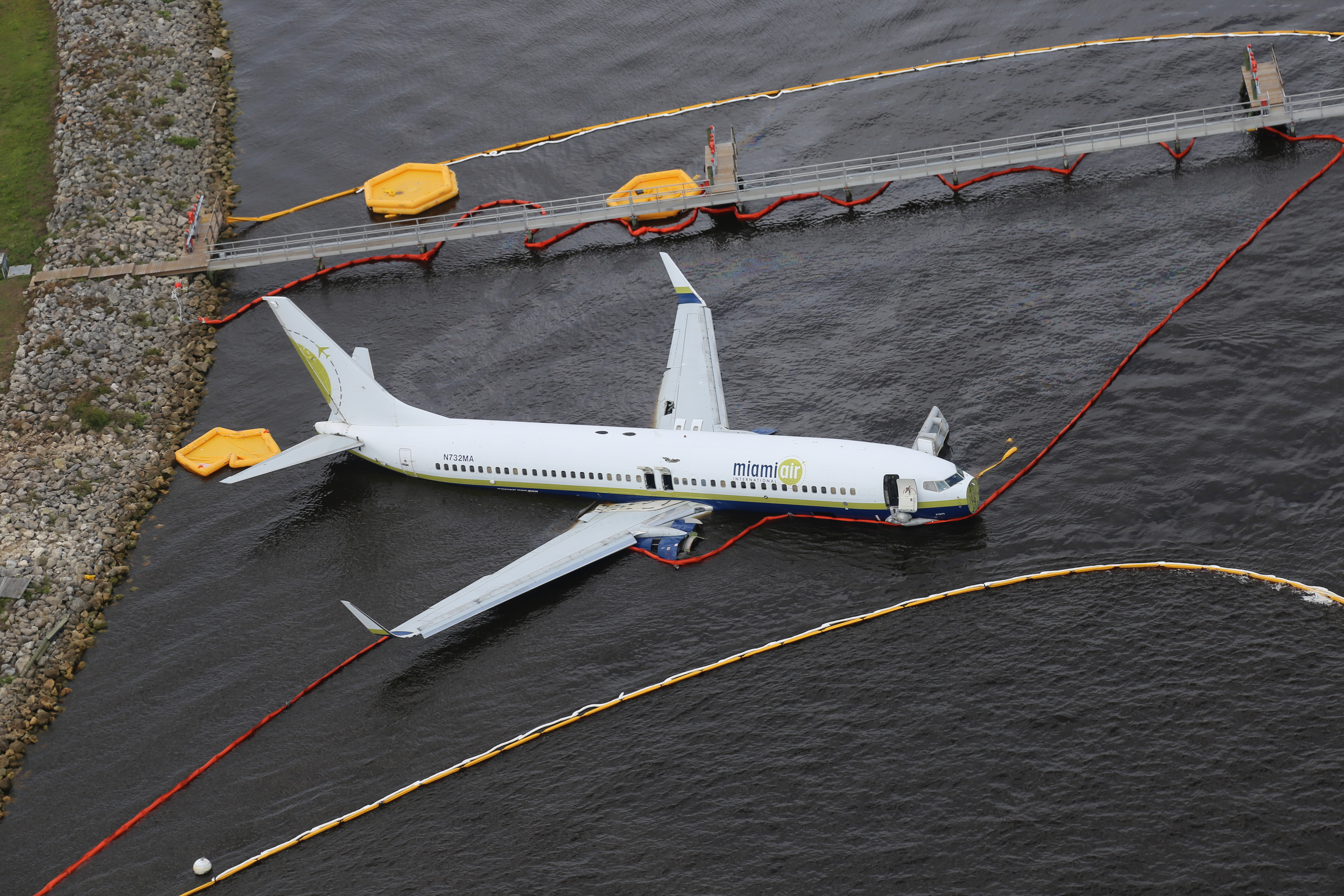
Miami Air Flight 293 in the St. Johns River

- January 14 – A Saha Airlines Boeing 707 crashed after overshooting the runway at Fath Air Base in Iran. The crew had attempted to land at the wrong airport; 15 of the 16 occupants were killed.
- February 23 – Atlas Air Flight 3591, a Boeing 767, en route from Miami, Florida, to Houston, Texas, United States, crashed into Trinity Bay on approach to George Bush Intercontinental Airport in Houston, killing both pilots and the single non-revenue passenger.
- February 24 – Biman Bangladesh Airlines Flight 147, a Boeing 737-800 flying from Bangladesh to Dubai, underwent an attempted hijacking and subsequently made an emergency landing at Shah Amanat International Airport in Chittagong; all passengers were safely evacuated and the perpetrator was shot dead by Bangladeshi special forces.
- March 4 – United Express Flight 4933, an Embraer ERJ145XR attempting to land at Presque Isle International Airport in Maine, touched down off the runway after the pilots continued the approach despite being unable to see the runway surface because of snow; three occupants suffered minor injuries.
- March 9 – A Laser Aéreo Douglas DC-3 crashed while attempting to land at La Vanguardia Airport, Villavicencio, Colombia, killing all 11 passengers and three crew members.
- March 10 – Ethiopian Airlines Flight 302, a Boeing 737 MAX 8 bound for Nairobi, Kenya, crashed near Bishoftu, Ethiopia, following an MCAS malfunction shortly after takeoff from Bole International Airport in Addis Ababa. All 157 occupants were killed. This was the second of two MAX flights that crashed, leading to the Boeing 737 MAX being grounded.
- May 3 – Miami Air International Flight 293, a Boeing 737-81Q operating a flight from Guantánamo Bay, Cuba, to Florida, United States, overshot the runway on landing at Naval Air Station Jacksonville during a thunderstorm; all 143 passengers and crew survived the accident.
- May 5 – Aeroflot Flight 1492, a Sukhoi Superjet 100 operating a domestic flight in Russia, suffered an in-flight electrical failure shortly after departing from Sheremetyevo International Airport, Moscow. After the pilots returned to the airport and made an emergency landing, the aircraft caught fire; 41 of the 78 people on board were killed.
- May 8 – Biman Bangladesh Airlines Flight 060, a Bombardier Q400 inbound from Shahjalal International Airport in Bangladesh, overshot the runway in bad weather at Yangon International Airport, Myanmar; all 33 people on board survived but 18 were injured.
- May 13 – A Taquan Air de Havilland Canada DHC-3 Turbine Otter collided in mid-air with a Mountain Air Service de Havilland Canada DHC-2 Beaver floatplane, while both were operating sightseeing flights over George Inlet, Alaska, United States. The DHC-2 pilot and all four passengers were killed; the DHC-3 attempted an emergency water landing, with the loss of one of its 10 passengers.
- June 27 – Angara Airlines Flight 200, an Antonov An-24 operating a domestic flight in Russia, suffered an in-flight engine failure and landed at Nizhneangarsk Airport where it subsequently overshot the runway and crashed into a building; all 43 passengers survived but two of the four crew members were killed.
- August 15 – Ural Airlines Flight 178, an Airbus A321 bound for Simferopol, Crimea, suffered multiple bird strikes immediately after takeoff from Zhukovsky International Airport in Moscow, Russia. The plane performed a belly landing in a cornfield; 74 of the 233 people on board were injured.
- September 11 – A Convair CV-440 crashed into a auto repair facility while on approach to Toledo Express Airport, killing both crew members on board.
- October 4 – Ukraine Air Alliance Flight 4050, an Antonov An-12 en route from Spain to Turkey, crashed on approach to its intermediate stopover at Lviv International Airport in Ukraine, because of fuel exhaustion; five of the eight occupants were killed and the three survivors were seriously injured.
- October 17 – PenAir Flight 3296, a Saab 2000 flying from Anchorage, Alaska, United States, to Amaknak Island off the Alaskan coast, overshot the runway after landing in erratic wind conditions, critically injuring two of the 42 people on board, one of whom died the next day.
- November 24 – A Busy Bee Dornier Do 228 crashed in a densely populated area shortly after takeoff from Goma International Airport in the Democratic Republic of the Congo, killing 21 of the 22 occupants and six people on the ground.
- December 27 – Bek Air Flight 2100, a Fokker 100 operating a domestic flight in Kazakhstan, crashed on takeoff from Almaty International Airport, killing 13 of the 98 people on board and injuring 66.

== 2020s ==
=== 2020 ===
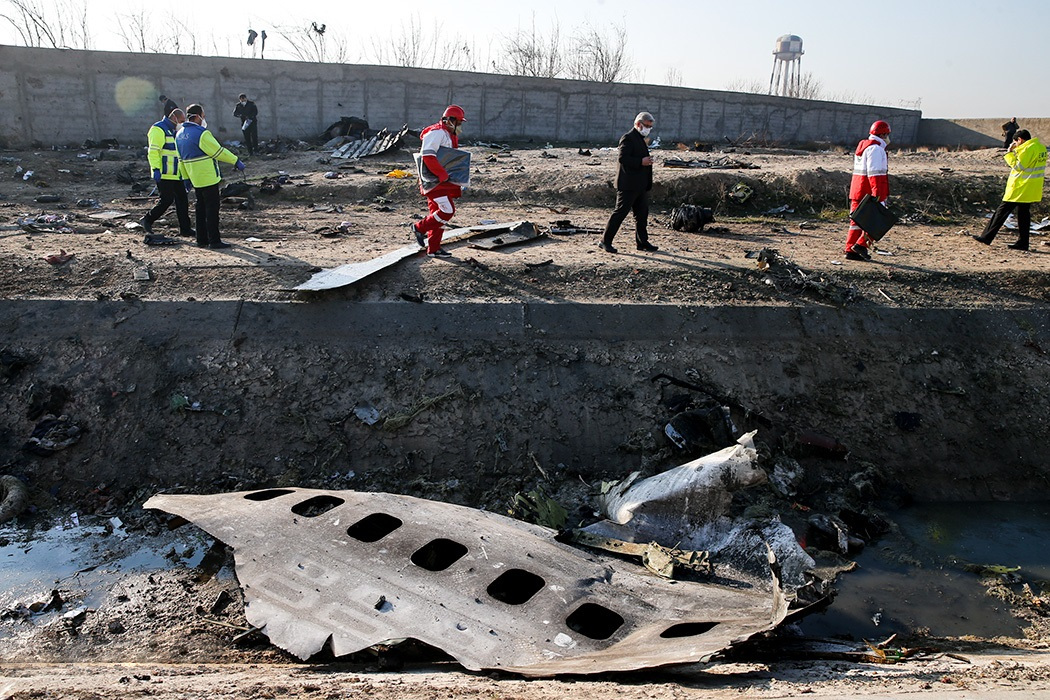
Wreckage of Ukrainian International Airlines Flight 752

- January 8 – Ukraine International Airlines Flight 752, a Boeing 737-800 bound for Kyiv, Ukraine, crashed shortly after taking off from Imam Khomeini International Airport in Tehran, Iran, after being hit by two surface-to-air missiles launched by Iranian military forces; all 176 passengers and crew were killed.
- January 14 – Delta Air Lines Flight 89, a Boeing 777-200ER, dumped fuel over several schools and neighbourhoods while returning to Los Angeles International Airport because of a compressor stall, injuring 56 people on the ground.

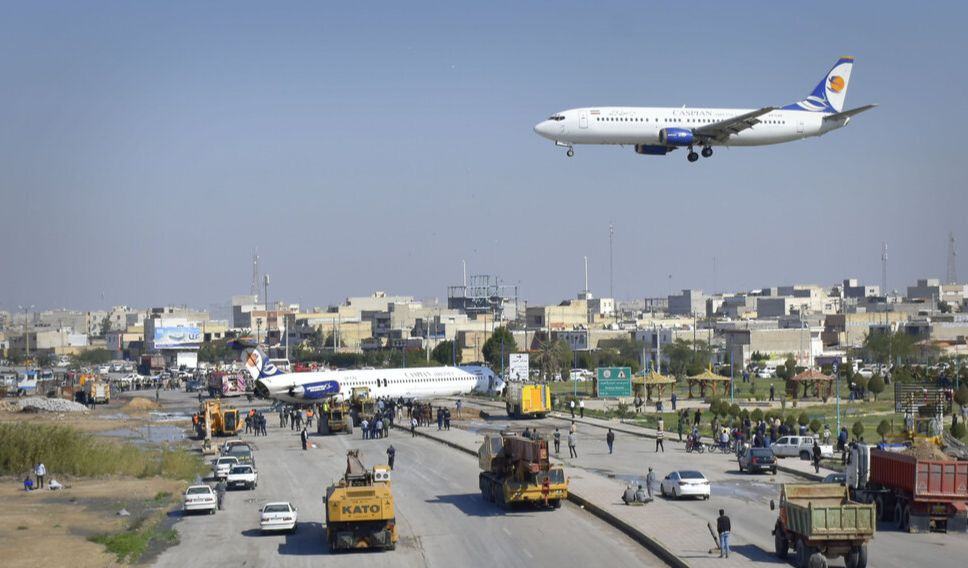
Caspian Airlines Flight 6936

- January 27 – Caspian Airlines Flight 6936, a McDonnell Douglas MD-83 on a domestic flight from Tehran, Iran, overran the runway on landing at Mahshahr Airport; the aircraft came to a stop on a road, injuring two of the 144 passengers and crew.
- February 5 – Pegasus Airlines Flight 2193, a Boeing 737-800 operating a domestic flight between İzmir and Istanbul in Turkey, skidded off the runway and dropped down an embankment on landing at Sabiha Gökçen International Airport; three of the 183 people on board were killed.
- May 4 – An East African Express Airways Embraer EMB 120 Brasilia crashed after being allegedly fired upon by Ethiopian ground forces during a charter cargo flight carrying pandemic relief supplies to Berdale, Somalia; all four passengers and two crew were killed.
- May 22 – Pakistan International Airlines Flight 8303, an Airbus A320, crashed in a residential neighbourhood in Karachi minutes before a second attempted landing at Jinnah International Airport. Two passengers survived among the 99 on board. One person on the ground later died from her injuries.
- July 22 – Ethiopian Airlines Cargo Flight 3739, a Boeing 777F scheduled to fly to Santiago, Chile, caught fire on the ground at Shanghai Airport, China. All five people on board evacuated safely.
- August 7 – Air India Express Flight 1344, a Boeing 737-800 operating an international repatriation flight, crashed on landing at Kozhikode International Airport, skidding off the runway and plunging into a gorge; 21 occupants were killed, including both pilots.
- August 22 – A South West Aviation Antonov An-26 crashed in a residential area after taking off for a charter cargo flight from Juba International Airport, South Sudan, killing eight of nine people on board.
- November 13 – Volga-Dnepr Airlines Flight 4066, an An-124 operating a cargo flight from Novosibirsk, Russia, to Vienna, Austria, suffered an uncontained engine failure on takeoff and overran the runway upon returning to Novosibirsk. All 14 crew members survived the incident.

=== 2021 ===
- January 9 – Sriwijaya Air Flight 182, a Boeing 737-500 operating a domestic flight to Pontianak, Indonesia, crashed because of a mismanaged auto throttle failure shortly after takeoff from Soekarno–Hatta International Airport in Jakarta. All 62 passengers and crew were killed.
- February 20 – Longtail Aviation Flight 5504, a Boeing 747-400BCF operating a cargo flight from Maastricht, Netherlands, to New York, United States, suffered engine failure shortly after takeoff. The aircraft diverted safely to Liege, Belgium, but two people on the ground were injured by falling debris.
- February 20 – United Airlines Flight 328, a Boeing 777-200 flying from Denver to Honolulu, suffered a contained engine failure after takeoff, scattering debris over residential neighbourhoods below. The pilots used the remaining engine to land safely in Denver. None of the 241 passengers and crew were injured, and no one on the ground was injured by the debris.
- March 2 – A South Sudan Supreme Airlines Let L-410 Turbolet crashed whilst operating a domestic flight from Pieri to Yuai, South Sudan. All eight passengers and two crew members were killed.
- May 12 – Key Lime Air Flight 970, a Swearingen Metroliner on a chartered cargo flight from Salida, Colorado, collided with a Cirrus SR22 on approach to Centennial Airport, Colorado. The Cirrus crash-landed in a nearby field, whilst the Swearingen Metroliner made an emergency landing. All three occupants of both aircraft survived.
- May 23 – Ryanair Flight 4978, a Boeing 737-800 operating an international scheduled passenger flight from Athens, Greece, to Vilnius, Lithuania, was ordered to land at Minsk, Belarus, after a false bomb alarm. Activist Roman Protasevich, who was on board the aircraft, was arrested.

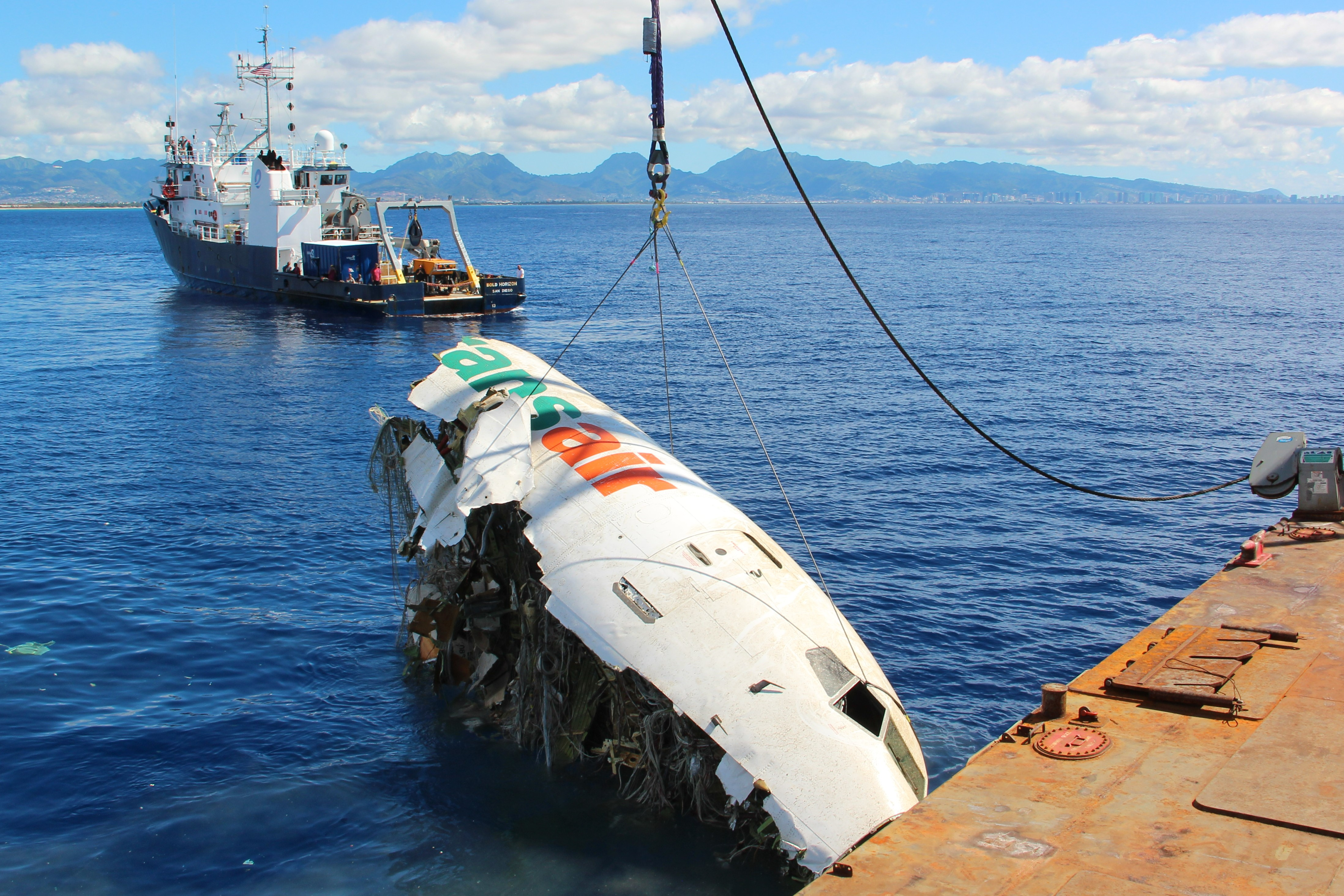
Cockpit section of Transair Flight 810

- July 2 – Transair Flight 810, a Boeing 737-200C operating a domestic cargo flight in Hawaii between Honolulu, Oahu and the neighbouring island of Maui, suffered an engine failure shortly after takeoff and ditched in the sea. Both pilots survived with injuries.
- July 6 – Petropavlovsk-Kamchatsky Air Enterprise Flight 251, an Antonov An-26 operating a domestic flight from Petropavlovsk-Kamchatsky to Palana, Russia, crashed while approach. All 22 passengers and six crew were killed.
- July 16 – Siberian Light Aviation Flight 42, an Antonov An-28 operating a domestic flight from Kedrovy to Tomsk, Russia, crash-landed after takeoff, injuring 11 of the 18 passengers and crew.
- September 12 – Siberian Light Aviation Flight 51, a Let L-410 operating a domestic flight from Irkutsk to Kazachinskoye, Russia, crashed in a forest short of the runway while attempting to land in heavy fog; four of the 16 occupants were killed, with the 12 survivors being seriously injured.

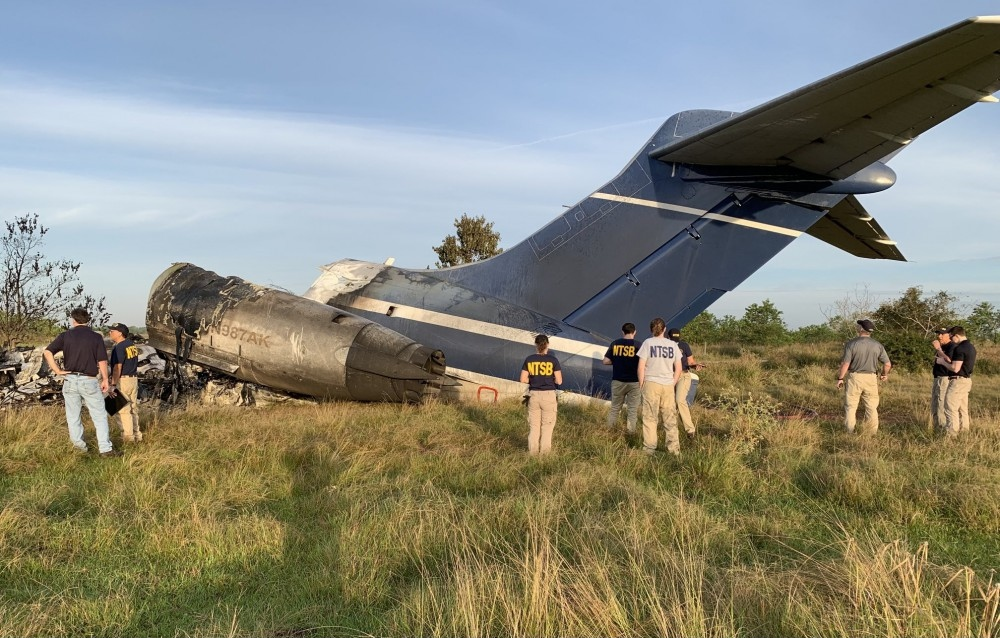
987 Investments LLC McDonnell Douglas MD-87 N987AK

- October 19 – A corporate McDonnell Douglas MD-87 crashed on takeoff from Houston Executive Airport, Houston, Texas. All 21 people on board survived.
- November 3 – Grodno Aviakompania Flight 1252, an Antonov An-12 on a cargo flight, crashed whilst attempting to land at Irkutsk International Airport, Russia. All nine on board were killed.

=== 2022 ===
- January 8 – Aviastar-TU Flight 6534, a Tupolev Tu-204-100C due to make a cargo flight to Novosibirsk, Russia, caught fire during pushback prior to takeoff from Hangzhou Jianqiao Airport in China, as a result of an oxygen leak in the cockpit. All eight crew members were able to evacuate.

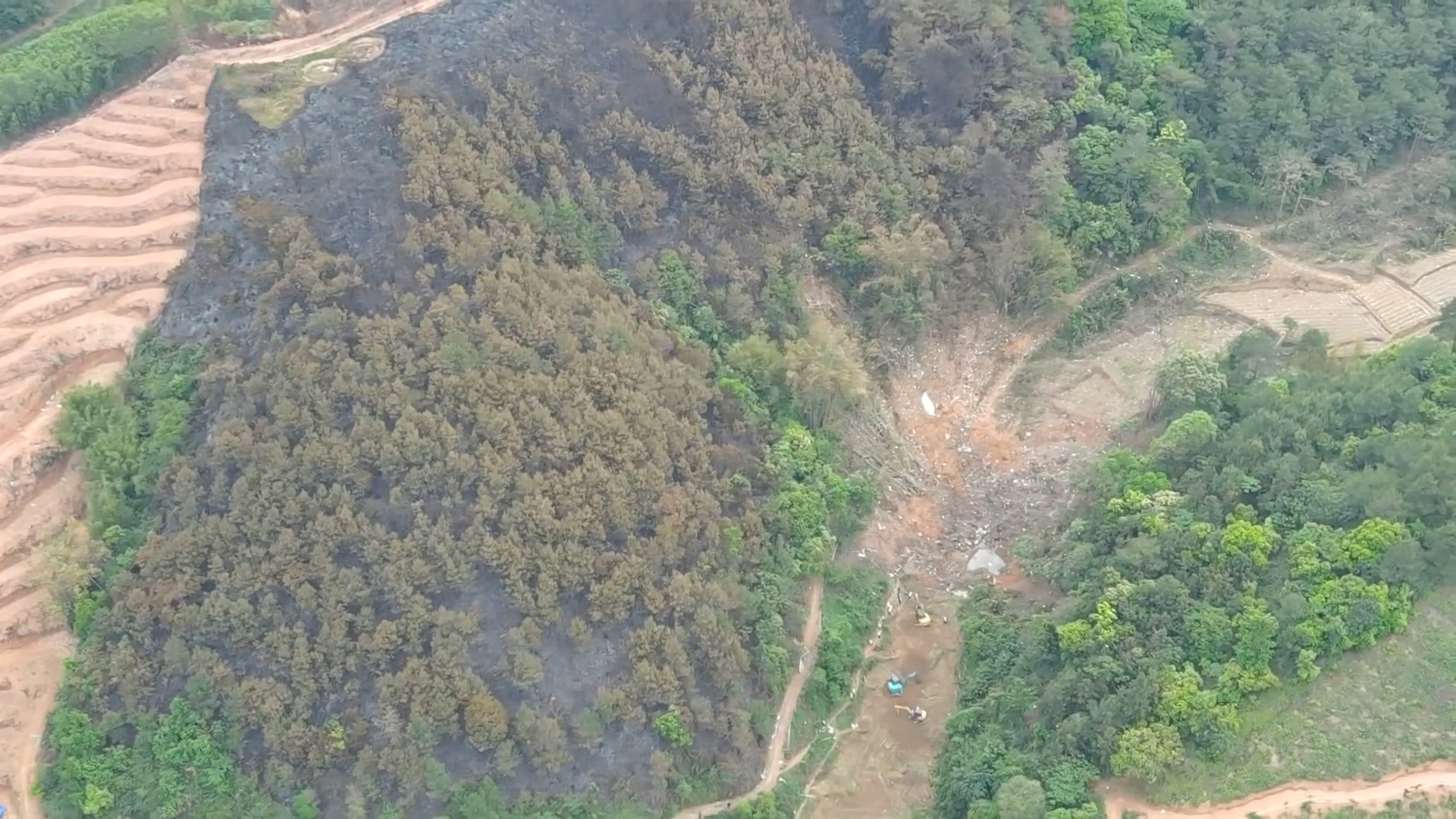
The crash site of China Eastern Airlines Flight 5735

- March 21 – China Eastern Airlines Flight 5735, a Boeing 737-89P operating a domestic flight from Kunming to Guangzhou, crashed in a mountainous region in Guangxi after entering a near-vertical nosedive, killing all 132 on board.
- April 7 – DHL de Guatemala Flight 7216, a Boeing 757-27A PCF, overran the runway and broke apart during an emergency landing at Juan Santamaría International Airport, Costa Rica, because of hydraulic problems. There were no serious injuries.
- May 11 – A Caverton Helicopter DHC-6, operated on behalf of COTCO, crashed while flying from Yaoundé to Dompta, Cameroon. All 11 people on board were killed.
- May 12 – Tibet Airlines Flight 9833, an Airbus A319-100, aborted a takeoff from Chongqing, China, veered off the runway, then caught fire, but all 122 occupants evacuated safely.
- May 29 – Tara Air Flight 197, a de Havilland Canada DHC-6 Twin Otter operating a flight from Pokhara to Jomsom, Nepal, crashed in poor weather conditions, killing all 22 on board.
- June 21 – RED Air Flight 203, a McDonnell Douglas MD-82 flying from Santo Domingo, Dominican Republic, experienced a landing gear collapse upon landing in Miami, leading to a runway excursion and fire. All 140 on board survived.
- July 16 – Meridian Flight 3032, an Antonov An-12 on a cargo flight carrying munitions from Niš, Serbia, to Dhaka, Bangladesh, crashed near Kavala in Greece, killing all eight on board.
- September 4 – A DHC-3 Turbine Otter crashed in Mutiny Bay, Washington, United States, killing all 10 on board.
- October 23 – Korean Air Flight 631, an Airbus A330-300 flying from Seoul, experienced a runway excursion while landing at Mactan-Cebu International Airport in the Philippines in bad weather and with a hydraulic failure following a previous aborted landing. The airplane collided with the ILS localizer antenna and runway approach lights at the end of the runway, but none of the 173 passengers and crew were injured.
- November 6 – Precision Air Flight 494, an ATR 42–500 on a domestic flight in Tanzania, crashed in Lake Victoria while attempting to land at Bukoba Airport. Of the 43 people on board, 19 were killed.
- November 18 – LATAM Perú Flight 2213, an Airbus A320neo operated by LATAM Chile taking off from Jorge Chávez International Airport, Peru, collided with a fire engine crossing the runway, killing three firefighters. All 102 passengers and six crew escaped unharmed. This was the first hull loss of an A320neo.

=== 2023 ===
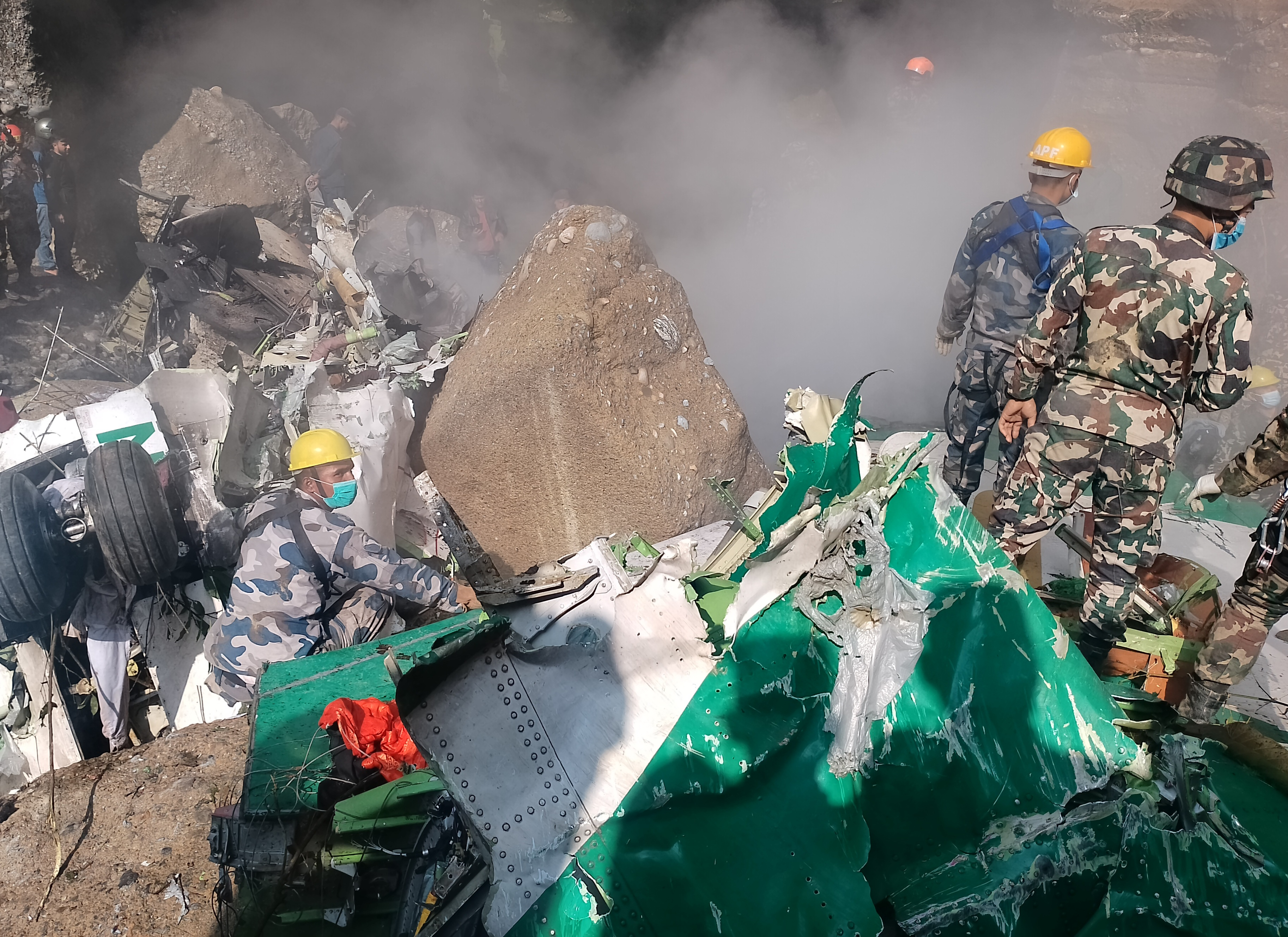
The burning wreckage of Flight 691

- January 15 – Yeti Airlines Flight 691, an ATR 72-500 operating a domestic flight from Tribhuvan International Airport to Pokhara International Airport, stalled and crashed in the gorge of the Seti Gandaki River in Pokhara, Nepal, after accidental feathering of the propellers. All 72 people on board were killed in the deadliest crash involving the ATR 72.
- September 12 – Ural Airlines Flight 1383, an Airbus A320 operating a flight from Sochi to Omsk in Russia, made an emergency landing in a corn field after reporting hydraulic issues. All 165 people on board survived without injuries.
- September 16 – A Manaus Aerotáxi Embraer Bandeirante crashed into an embankment on approach to Barcelos Airport, Brazil, while performing a go-around, killing all 14 occupants.
- October 4 – FedEx Express Flight 1376, a Boeing 757F flying to Memphis, had an hydraulic failure shortly after take off from Chattanooga. The aircraft turned back to its departure airport where it made a belly landing. All three on board survived.
- October 22 – Alaska Airlines Flight 2059, an Embraer 175 operated by Horizon Air from Everett to San Francisco, diverted to Portland after an off-duty pilot attempted to shut off both engines with the fire handles. The off-duty pilot was subdued and arrested after landing. There were no injuries.

=== 2024 ===
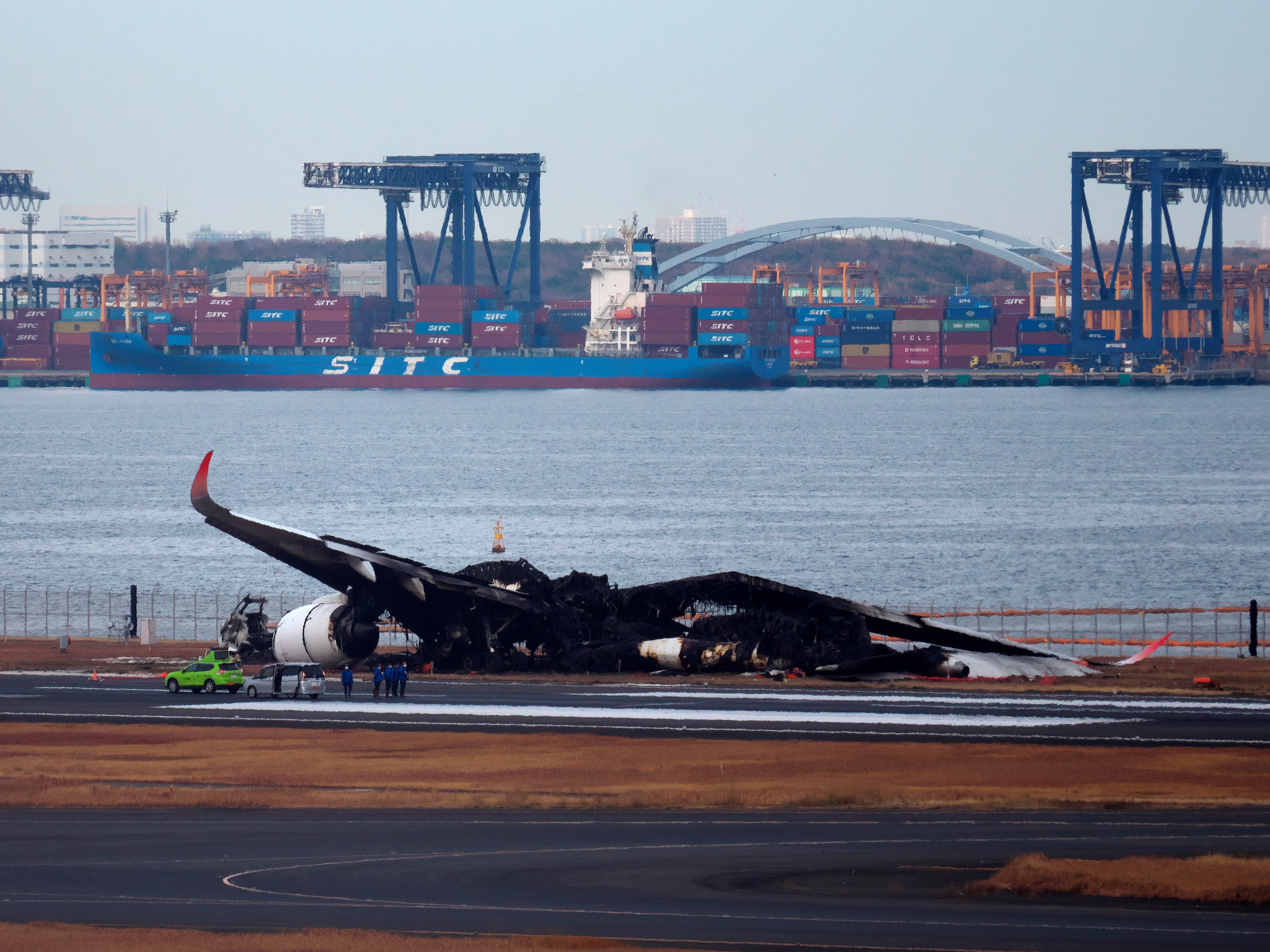
Wreckage of Japan Airlines Flight 516 after the 2024 Haneda Airport runway collision

- January 2 – In the 2024 Haneda Airport runway collision, Japan Airlines Flight 516, an Airbus A350 operating from New Chitose Airport to Haneda Airport, collided with a Japan Coast Guard de Havilland Canada Dash 8 aircraft while landing. All 379 people on board the Japan Airlines flight were evacuated safely, while five of the six occupants of the Coast Guard aircraft were killed. Both aircraft were destroyed. This was the first hull loss of an Airbus A350. The destroyed DHC-8 had been scheduled to provide support in the response to the Noto earthquake the day prior.
- January 5 – Alaska Airlines Flight 1282, a Boeing 737 MAX 9 departing from Portland International Airport, experienced uncontrolled decompression when a plug covering an unused exit door blew out. The aircraft made a safe return to Portland and all 177 people on board survived, with eight injured.
- January 23 – Northwestern Air Flight 738, a British Aerospace Jetstream carrying mine workers from Fort Smith, Northwest Territories, to the Diavik Diamond Mine in Northwest Territories, Canada, crashed shortly after takeoff, killing six of the seven passengers and crew.
- February 18 – Air Serbia Flight 324, an Embraer 195 operated by Marathon Airlines, struck landing lights on takeoff at Belgrade Nikola Tesla Airport. The aircraft flew for another hour and made an emergency landing at the same airport with a large hole in the fuselage. All 111 occupants survived unharmed.
- March 5 – Safarilink Aviation Flight 053, a de Havilland Canada Dash 8, collided with a Cessna 172 over Nairobi National Park in Kenya shortly after takeoff from Wilson Airport. The Cessna 172 crashed, killing both occupants, while the Dash 8 returned safely to the airport, with the 44 passengers and crew unharmed.
- March 11 – LATAM Airlines Flight 800, a Boeing 787-9 flying from Sydney, Australia, to Santiago, Chile, with a stopover in Auckland, New Zealand, suffered an in-flight upset on the first leg of the flight, injuring 50 people. The aircraft landed safely at Auckland Airport.
- April 23 – A Douglas C-54D operated by Alaska Air Fuel crashed near the Tanana River shortly after takeoff, killing both crew members.
- May 21 – Singapore Airlines Flight 321, a Boeing 777-300ER flying from London to Singapore, encountered severe turbulence, resulting in the death of one passenger and injuries to another 104 occupants. The flight was diverted to Suvarnabhumi Airport, Bangkok, Thailand.
- July 12 – Gazpromavia Flight 9608, a Sukhoi Superjet 100-95LR, crashed in a wooded area near Kolomna, Russia, during a ferry flight, killing all three on board. A fault in the aircraft's computers caused the safety system to pitch the airplane down.

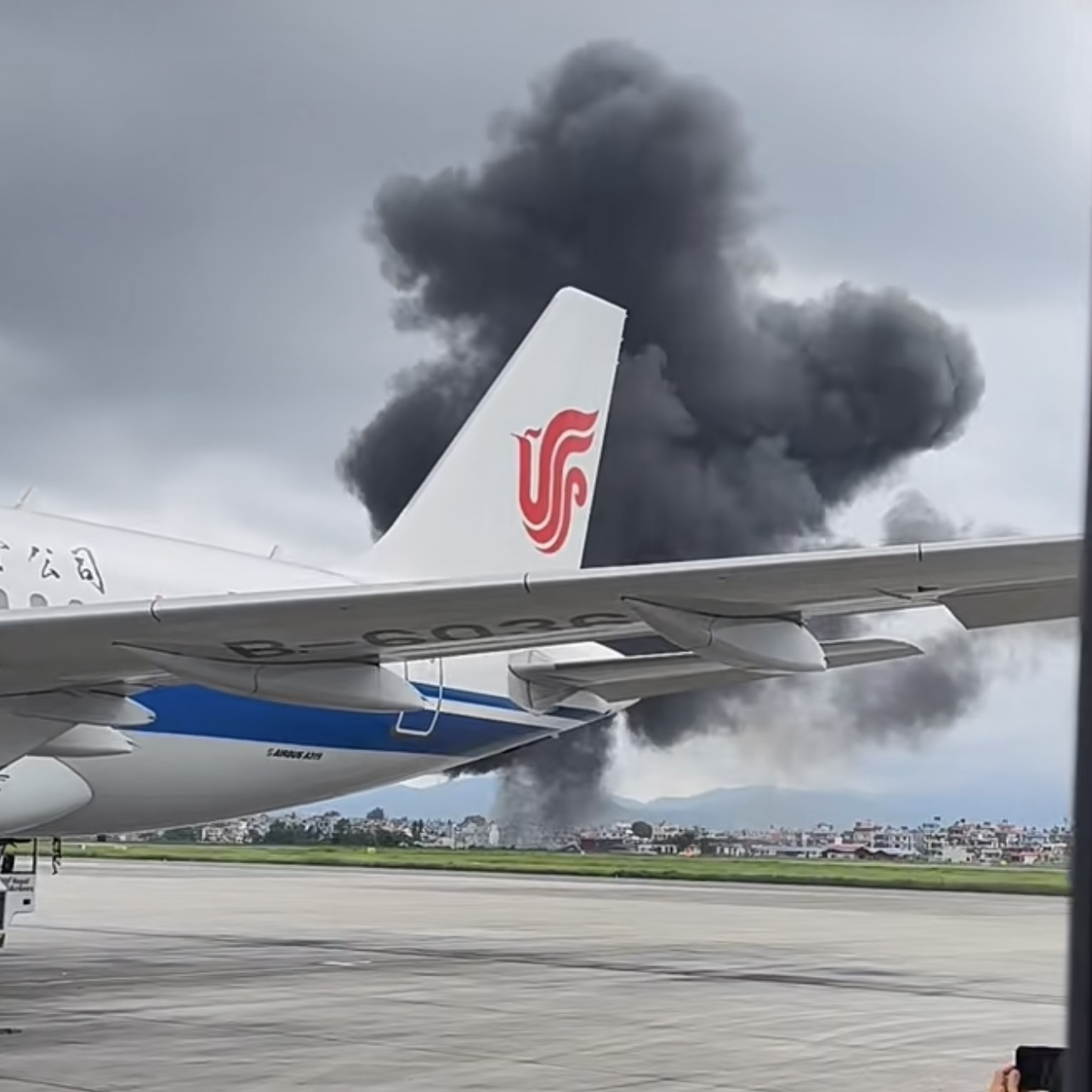
Smoke rising from the crash site of the Saurya Airlines CRJ200

- July 24 – A Saurya Airlines Bombardier CRJ-200ER crashed shortly after taking off from Kathmandu Tribhuvan Airport in Nepal, whilst en route to Pokhara International Airport, killing 18 of the 19 occupants.
- August 9 – Voepass Flight 2283, an ATR-72-500 flying from Cascavel Airport to Guarulhos International Airport, São Paulo, Brazil, entered a flat spin and crashed in Vinhedo, São Paulo. All 62 occupants died.
- August 22 – Thai Flying Service Flight 209, a Cessna 208 Grand Caravan flying from Bangkok to Ko Mai Si, Thailand, crashed in a mangrove swamp shortly after taking off from Suvarnabhumi Airport, killing all nine people on board.
- August 31 – A Vityaz-Aero Mil Mi-8T crashed near the Vachkazhets volcano, in Kamchatka Krai, Russia, in poor weather conditions. All 22 occupants were killed.
- November 9 – Total Linhas Aéreas Flight 5682, a Boeing 737-4Q8 (SF), suffered an in-flight fire in the cargo hold while en route from Vitória to Guarulhos, Brazil. The aircraft performed an emergency landing in Guarulhos. Both crew members survived but the aircraft was destroyed by the fire.
- November 25 – Swiftair Flight 5960, a Boeing 737-400SF operating on behalf of DHL, crashed near a two-storey house on approach to Vilnius, Lithuania, killing one of the four crew members.
- December 23 – Swiss International Air Lines Flight 1885, an Airbus A220-300 operating from Bucharest to Zurich, made an emergency landing at Graz Airport, following an engine failure and smoke in the cabin. The aircraft was evacuated, and 17 passengers and five crew members were hospitalized. A flight attendant died in the hospital one week later making this the first fatal accident involving an Airbus A220.
- December 25 – Azerbaijan Airlines Flight 8243, an Embraer 190AR, crashed near Aktau, Kazakhstan, during an emergency landing, after being damaged by a Russian surface-to-air missile that detonated near the aircraft. Of the 67 occupants, 38 were killed.

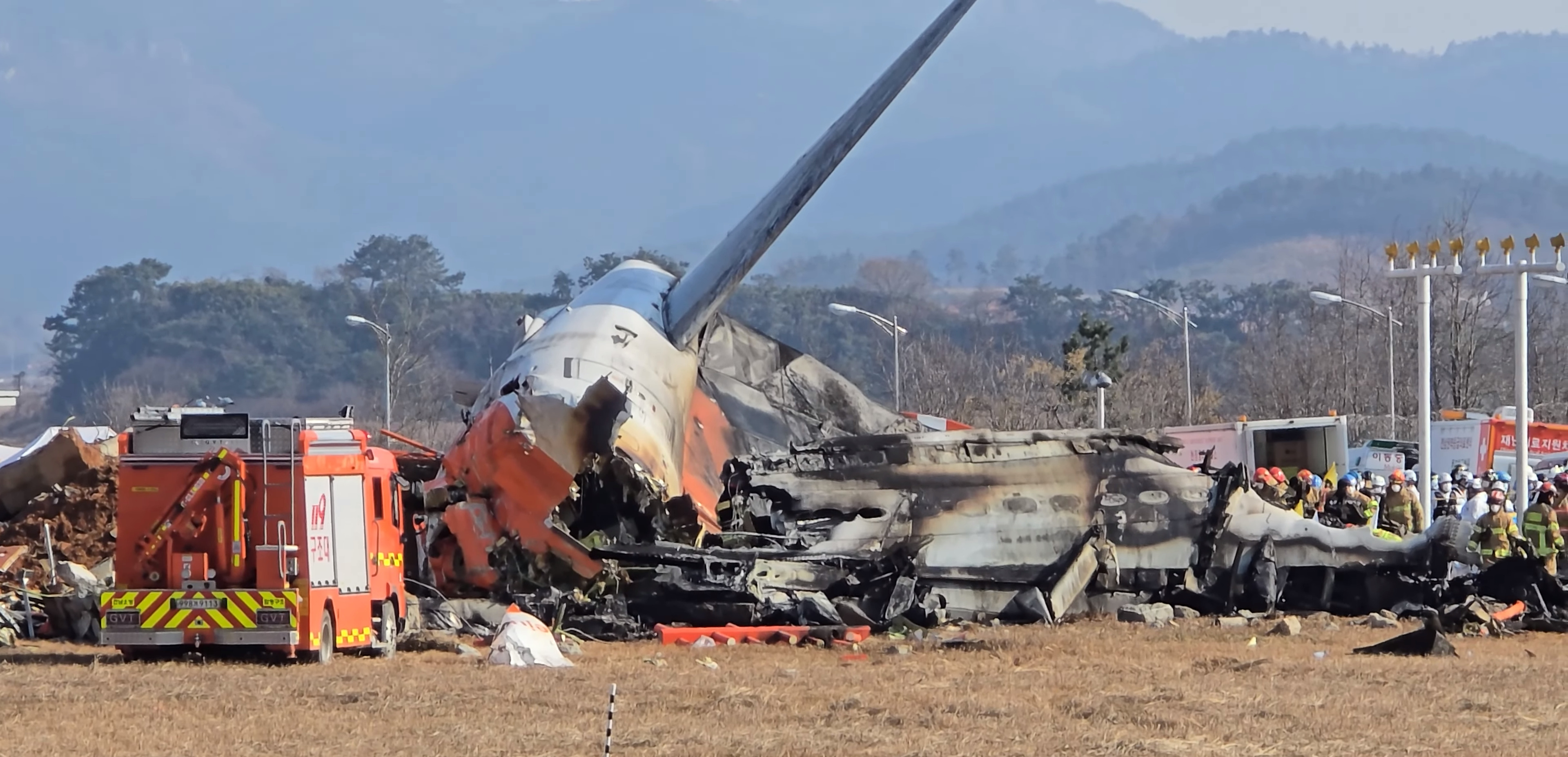
Wreckage of Jeju Air Flight 2216

- December 29 – Jeju Air Flight 2216, a Boeing 737-800, crashed into an embankment and exploded while attempting to land at Muan International Airport, South Korea. Of the 181 occupants, 179 were killed in the deadliest accident involving the Boeing 737 Next Generation and the deadliest aviation accident to occur on South Korean soil.

=== 2025 ===
- January 28 – Air Busan Flight 391, an Airbus A321-200 operating from Busan, South Korea, to Hong Kong, caught fire shortly before takeoff at Gimhae International Airport. All 176 people on board survived, with 27 injured.
- January 29 – A Light Air Services Beechcraft 1900 that was carrying oil workers crashed shortly after takeoff from GPOC Unity Airstrip in South Sudan. Of the 21 occupants, only one survived.

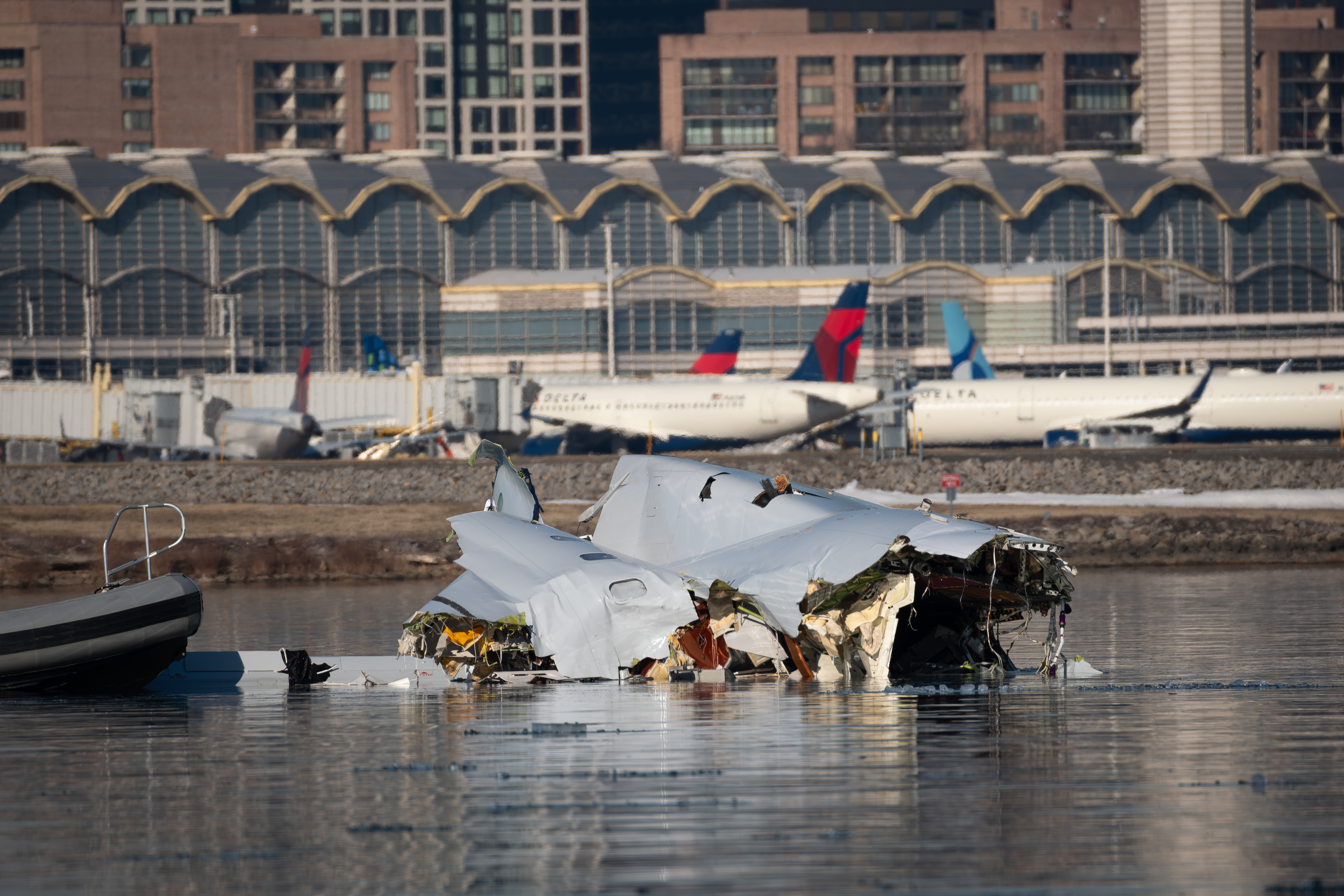
The wreckage of the American Eagle CRJ700, N709PS, after the 2025 Potomac River mid-air collision

- January 29 – In the 2025 Potomac River mid-air collision, American Eagle Flight 5342, a Bombardier CRJ700 operated by PSA Airlines, collided with a US Army Sikorsky UH-60L over the Potomac River in Washington, D.C., killing all 64 people on board the CRJ700 and all three on board the UH-60.
- February 6 – Bering Air Flight 445, a Cessna 208B Grand Caravan flying from Unalakleet to Nome, Alaska, crashed into an ice floe in Norton Sound, killing all 10 people on board.
- February 17 – Delta Connection Flight 4819, a Bombardier CRJ900, crashed upon landing at Toronto Pearson International Airport. All 76 passengers and four crew survived, with 21 injured.
- March 17 – Aerolínea Lanhsa Flight 018, a British Aerospace Jetstream 32, crashed into the sea after overshooting the runway on takeoff from Roatán Airport, Honduras; 13 of the 18 people on board were killed.
- April 17 – Tropic Air Flight 711, a Cessna 208B Grand Caravan EX, was hijacked while flying from Corozal to San Pedro in Belize. Low on fuel, the aircraft made an emergency landing in Belize City. On landing, the hijacker injured three of the 15 other occupants and was then shot dead by an armed passenger.

The wreckage of Air India Flight 171's tail section embedded in a building at the crash site

- June 12 – Air India Flight 171, a Boeing 787-8 operating a flight from Ahmedabad Airport to London Gatwick Airport, crashed into a nearby medical college building less than a minute after takeoff, killing 241 out of 242 people on board and 19 people on the ground. This was the first hull loss and the first fatal accident involving the Boeing 787.
- July 24 – Angara Airlines Flight 2311, an Antonov An-24, crashed into a mountain while approaching Tynda Airport in Russia, killing all 42 passengers and six crew members.
- October 20 – Emirates SkyCargo Flight 9788, a Boeing 747-400BDSF operated by Air ACT, skidded off the runway and collided with an airport maintenance vehicle upon landing at Hong Kong International Airport, killing two people inside the maintenance vehicle.
- October 28 – Mombasa Air Safari Flight 203, a Cessna 208B Grand Caravan on a domestic flight in Kenya from Ukunda to Kichwa, crashed near Kwale, killing all 11 people on board.
- November 4 – UPS Airlines Flight 2976, a McDonnell Douglas MD-11F on a domestic flight from Louisville to Honolulu, crashed shortly after takeoff; 15 people were killed and 22 injured.

=== 2026 ===
- January 17 – An Indonesia Air Transport ATR 42-512 operated on behalf of the Directorate General of Marine and Fisheries Resources Surveillance crashed in Sulawesi, while flying from Yogyakarta to Makassar, killing all 10 occupants.
- January 28 – SATENA Flight 8849, a Beechcraft 1900D operated by SEARCA, crashed in Curasica, Playa de Belén, Colombia, while flying from Cúcuta to Ocaña, killing all 15 occupants.
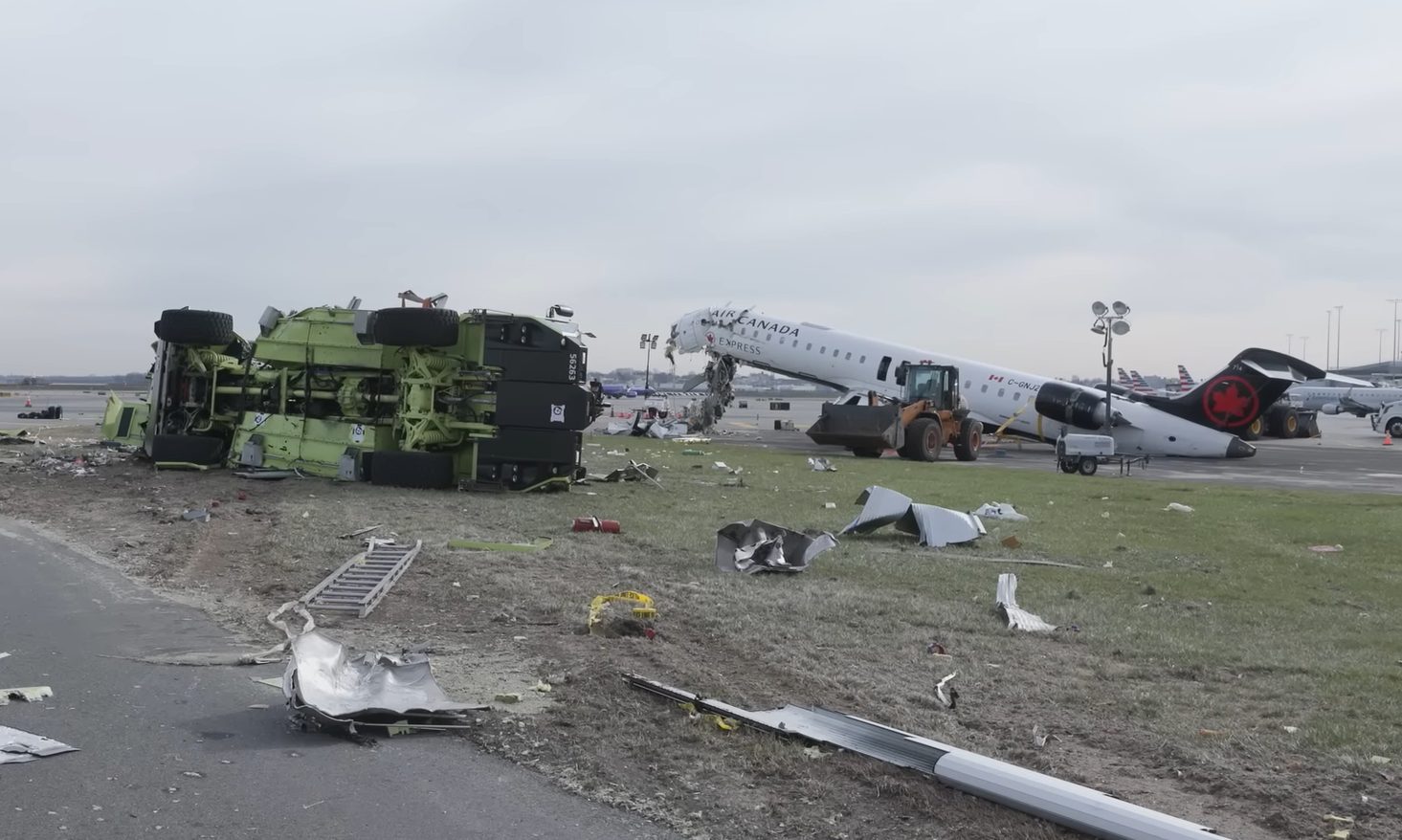
  The wreckage of Air Canada Express Flight 8646 and the airport fire truck
- March 22 – Air Canada Express Flight 8646, a Bombardier CRJ-900 operated by Jazz Aviation, collided with a fire truck while landing at LaGuardia Airport, killing the two pilots and injuring 37. This marks the first fatal crash involving a CRJ-900.
- July 7 – K2 Airways Flight 1732, a Boeing 737-400F, crashed in the Arabian Sea near the coast of Ormara, Pakistan, killing all five occupants on board.
- July 10 – Ryanair Flight 1879, a Boeing 737-800 flying from Thessaloniki to Memmingen, suffered from an uncontained engine failure, with debris striking a window, causing a passenger to be partially sucked out of the aircraft. The airplane then made a safe emergency landing back in Thessaloniki, with all 155 people on board surviving and at least one injury being reported.
- August 1 – An Aerodiana Cessna 208B Grand Caravan crashed after taking off from Pisco, Peru, for a sightseeing flight over the Nazca Lines. All 13 people on board were killed.
- August 5 – European Air Transport Leipzig Flight 9LE, a Boeing 757-23N (SF) coming from Marseille, collided with a drone on approach to Leipzig. The aircraft diverted safely to Hannover and everyone on board survived.
- August 20 – Security Aviation Flight 45, a Cessna 441, crashed short of the runway on approach to Cape Newenham LRRS Airport. All 8 people on board were killed.
- September 6 – 21 Air Flight 7598, a Boeing 767-300F operated for Amazon Air, overran the runway at Miami International Airport, collided with vehicles and caught fire. The two pilots escaped with injuries, but 5 people on the ground were killed.
- September 25 – A Tracep Aviation Congo Let L-410UVP, flying from Kikit to Kinshasa, crashed while attempting an emergency landing in Kenge, Democratic Republic of the Congo. All 17 people on board were killed.
- September 30 – Flydubai Flight 1073, a Boeing 737 MAX 8 flying from Dubai to Tel Aviv, plunged 14,000 feet (4,300 m) in under a minute at a speed of 600 miles per hour (970 km/h) after the first officer stabbed the captain and put the plane in a dive. Passengers within the aircraft intervened and neutralized the first officer. The assailant was subdued and the aircraft made an emergency landing in Tabuk, Saudi Arabia; all 180 people on board survived.

== See also ==
- List of deadliest aircraft accidents and incidents
