= Aeroflot accidents and incidents in the 1990s =

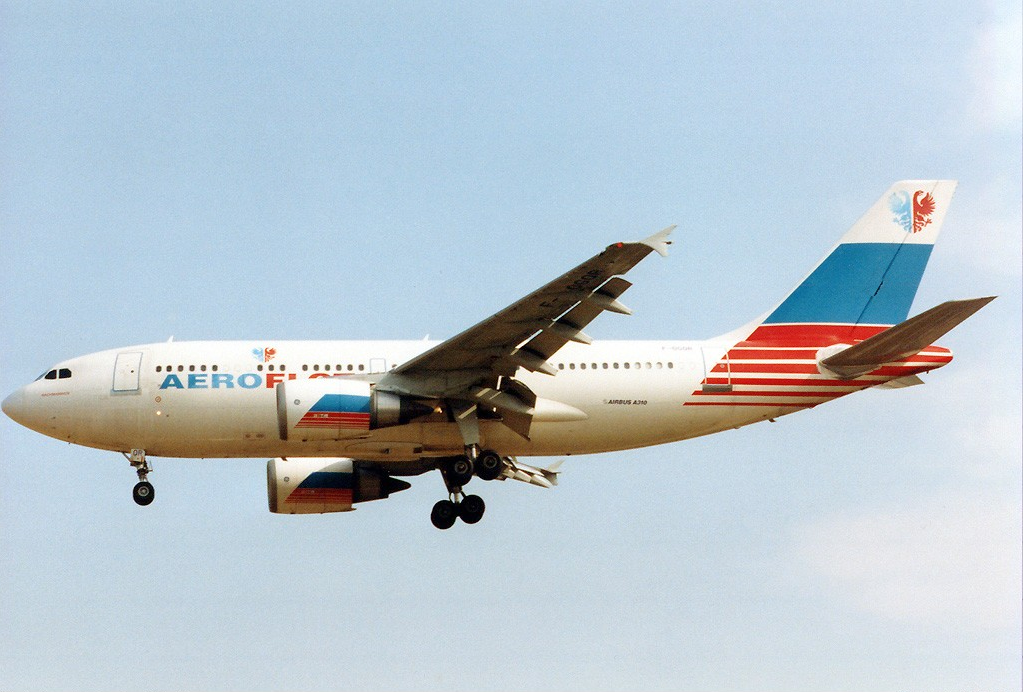
An Airbus A310-300, similar to the one involved in the crash of Flight 593, is seen here on short final to London Heathrow Airport in August 1994.

After the dissolution of the Soviet Union in December 1991, its former republics started establishing their own carriers from the corresponding directorates Aeroflot had at these countries, causing the airline to shrink drastically. The fleet reduced from several thousand aircraft to a number slightly over 100 in 1993, helping the former Soviet Union's national airline to improve its accidents and incidents record sharply. The company experienced 42 events between 1990 and 1991 only, and had 41 occurrences in the rest of the decade. Despite this, the three deadliest accidents the airline went through in the decade occurred in the post-Soviet era, leaving a death toll of 257, each one involving more than 50 fatalities.

The worst accident involved a Tupolev Tu-134A that contacted trees on approach to Ivanovo Airport in August 1992, crashing and killing all 84 passengers and crew on board. The most infamous crash and the second worst accident for the company in the decade occurred in March 1994 when an Airbus A310 that was flying the Moscow–Hong Kong route crashed in the Kemerovo Oblast shortly after the captain's son manipulated the controls of the aircraft, with the loss of 75 lives.

Overall, 525 people lost their lives either on board Aeroflot aircraft or on the ground. The number of aircraft the airline wrote off during the decade fell to 71, split into an Airbus A310-300, two Antonov An-12s, an Antonov An-124, 20 Antonov An-2s, five Antonov An-24s, two Antonov An-26s, five Antonov An-28s, two Ilyushin Il-14s, four Ilyushin Il-62s, two Ilyushin Il-76s, two Ilyushin Il-86s, five Let L-410s, six Tupolev Tu-134s, six Tupolev Tu-154s, seven Yakovlev Yak-40s and a Yakovlev Yak-42.

Following is a list of the accidents and incidents Aeroflot experienced during the decade.

== List ==
Date	Location	Aircraft	Tail number	Airline division	Aircraft damage	Fatalities	Description	Refs
1990	Unknown	An-2P	CCCP-07308	Krasnoyarsk	W/O	5/5	Mid-air collision.	
13 January 1990	(Soviet Union) Pervouralsk	Tu-134A	CCCP-65951	North Caucasus	W/O	27/71 (Note: Figures for both the occupants of the airliner and the fatalities vary.)	The aircraft was en route a domestic scheduled Tyumen–Ufa passenger service as Flight 6246 at 10,600 metres (34,800 ft) when smoke in the rear cargo hold prompted a fire warning in both engines, probably due to a short circuit of the electrical wiring. The crew made an emergency descent, and the airplane force landed on snowy fields, 3 kilometres (1.9 mi; 1.6 nmi) away from Pervouralsk.	
20 February 1990	(Soviet Union) Šiauliai	An-2R	CCCP-56472	Lithuania	W/O	Unknown	Crashed.	
16 March 1990	(Soviet Union) Chita Airport	An-28	CCCP-28702	East Siberia	W/O	0	During the approach, the aircraft landed hard due to pilot error, damaging the landing gear. The crew performed a go-around and landed on the damaged landing gear. The aircraft, operating a training flight out of Chita, was written off.	
27 March 1990	(Afghanistan) Kabul	Il-76MD	CCCP-78781	Uzbekistan	W/O	11/11	The aircraft, on loan from the Soviet Air Force, was operating a Kokand-Kabul cargo service. At 5,400 metres (17,700 ft), while on approach to Kabul, air traffic control ordered the pilot to discontinue the approach. The flaps and landing gear were retracted, yet the approach was continued. The aircraft stalled and crashed.	
13 April 1990	(Soviet Union) Uelen	An-2T	CCCP-04355	Magadan	W/O	1/6	During takeoff, the aircraft pitched up, lost airspeed, stalled and crashed on the snow-covered, frozen Uelen Lagoon. The aircraft was overloaded, causing the center of gravity to move beyond limits. The aircraft was operating a Uelen–Provideniya cargo service in support of the "Great Circle" international expedition.	
2 June 1990	(Soviet Union) Kenkiyak	An-24B	CCCP-46551	North Caucasus	W/O	0/33	A hard landing caused the nosegear to break up. The aircraft overran the runway and was destroyed by fire.	
12 June 1990	(Afghanistan) Kabul	Il-76MD	CCCP-86905	Uzbekistan	W/O	0/10	Forced landing at Kabul Airport, after it was struck by a missile at 25,500 feet (7,800 m).	
26 June 1990	(Soviet Union) Shurma	An-2R	CCCP-19730	Ural	W/O	3/3	The aircraft was returning from crop-spraying at Malmyzh when the pilots, who were drunk, performed stunts at low altitude. The aircraft was "hopping" over trees when it lost airspeed, banked, crashed in a forest and caught fire.	
1 July 1990	(Soviet Union) Yakutsk	Il-62M	CCCP-86456	Moscow	W/O	0/109	Overran the runway upon landing at Yakutsk Airport. After touching down, the pilots accidentally set engines one and four to takeoff thrust rather than reverse thrust and the aircraft picked up speed as a result. The pilots did not realize their mistake and attempted emergency braking, but this blew out all landing gear tires. As speed increased the crew shut down all four engines, but too late, as there was not enough runway length to stop. The aircraft overran at 200 km/h (108 kn; 124 mph) and rolled another 397 metres (1,302 ft) before stopping. The landing gear collapsed and the fuselage broke in three. The aircraft was completing a Moscow–Yakutsk passenger service as Flight 93.	
19 July 1990	Unknown	An-2	CCCP-40861	Yakut	W/O	Unknown	Crashed into mountainous terrain.	
1 August 1990	(Soviet Union) Aghdam	Yak-40	CCCP-87453	Armenia	W/O	46/46 (Note: Both the number of casualties and the number of occupants aboard are in discrepancy.)	Struck a mountain at 2,520 metres (8,270 ft) in cloudy conditions, 22 kilometres (14 mi; 12 nmi) west of Stepanakert, during approach to Stepanakert Airport inbound from Yerevan as Flight E-35D.	
12 August 1990	Unknown	An-2	CCCP-62407	Yakut	W/O	Unknown	Crashed in a forest.	
18 August 1990	(Soviet Union) Rushan	An-28	CCCP-28761	Tajikistan	W/O	0	Hard landing short of the runway.	
19 August 1990	(Pakistan) Karachi	Tu-154	CCCP-85323	Neryungri	-	0/92	Aircraft got hijacked to Karachi, Pakistan. Originated from Chulman Neryungri Airport operated as Flight 4076	
9 September 1990	(Soviet Union) Pavlodar	Yak-40	CCCP-87451	Kazakhstan	W/O	0	CCCP-87914 ran off the runway upon landing at Pavlodar Airport, and collided with CCCP-87451, breaking it up.	
9 September 1990	(Soviet Union) Pavlodar	Yak-40K	CCCP-87914	Kazakhstan	W/O	0/22	CCCP-87914 ran off the runway upon landing at Pavlodar Airport, and collided with CCCP-87451, breaking it up.	
12 September 1990	(Soviet Union) Rushan	Il-14LIK-1	CCCP-41803	Central	W/O	0	Belly-landed on a glacier, 353 kilometres (219 mi) off Mirny Ice Station.	
14 September 1990	(Soviet Union) Sverdlovsk	Yak-42	CCCP-42351	North Caucasus	W/O	4/129	The pilot intentionally deviated from the approach pattern. As a result, the aircraft broke up after it struck trees on approach to Koltsovo Airport, inbound from Volgograd on a domestic scheduled passenger service as Flight 8175.	
12 October 1990	(Soviet Union) Odessa	L-410UVP	CCCP-67331	Ukraine	W/O	0/15	Hard landing at Odesa Airport.	
20 October 1990	(Soviet Union) Kutaisi	Tu-154B-1	CCCP-85268	Georgia	W/O	0/171	The aircraft failed to get airborne on takeoff from Kutaisi Airport due to overloading, overrunning the runway.	
2 November 1990	(Soviet Union) Nyurba	An-26B	CCCP-26038	East Siberia	W/O	Unknown	Crashed upon landing.	
17 November 1990	(Czechoslovakia) Velichovky	Tu-154M	CCCP-85664	International	W/O	0/6	The aircraft was flying a Euroairport–Sheremetyevo cargo service, when a fire broke out at 10,600 metres (34,800 ft), prompting the flightcrew to make an emergency landing.	
21 November 1990	(Soviet Union) Magan Airport	Il-62	CCCP-86613	Domodedovo	W/O	0/189	While en route to Yakutsk the crew were informed that visibility was poor at Yakutsk Airport. The crew considered diverting to Khabarovsk, but visibility improved at Yakutsk. While descending to 1,800 metres (5,900 ft), ATC reported that visibility at Yakutsk had dropped again. The crew diverted to Magan Airport and continued descending. The aircraft touched down halfway down the runway. Realizing that the aircraft would overrun the runway, the crew extended the spoilers and braked hard; just before the end of the runway the pilot ordered the engines to be shut down. The aircraft ran off the runway and steered right to avoid the localizer building. The landing gear was ripped off as the aircraft crossed a dirt road and the aircraft then finally came to rest at a snow-covered ravine. The aircraft was completing a domestic scheduled Moscow–Yakutsk passenger service as Flight 95.	
30 November 1990	(Soviet Union) Dikson Airport	Yak-40K	CCCP-87394	Krasnoyarsk	W/O	0/35	The aircraft came in too high in bad weather. Touching down at high speed, the aircraft overran the runway and ended up in a gully. The aircraft was completing a domestic scheduled Krasnoyarsk–Dikson passenger service.	
14 December 1990	(Soviet Union) Shakhtersk Airport	An-24B	CCCP-47164	Far East	W/O	0/43	Undershot the runway and landed hard.	
4 March 1991	(Soviet Union) Leningrad	An-24	Unknown	Unknown	Minor	1/26	While en route from Kotlas to Leningrad, the aircraft was hijacked by a male hijacker who demanded to be taken to Sweden. At Pulkovo Airport, the hijacker released the hostages, but refused to surrender. The grenade he carried with him exploded; he later died from the injuries he received.	
23 March 1991	(Soviet Union) Navoiy	An-24RV	CCCP-46472	Uzbekistan	W/O	34/63	Overran the runway on landing at Navoi Airport, hitting a heap of iron and concrete, breaking up and catching fire.	
23 May 1991	(Soviet Union) Leningrad	Tu-154B-1	CCCP-85097	Leningrad	W/O	15/178	Hard landing short of the runway at Pulkovo Airport. The main starboard undercarriage collapsed, causing the break up of the airframe. Two people were killed on the ground. The aircraft was operating a Sukhumi-St. Petersburg service as Flight 8556.	
24 June 1991	(Soviet Union) Radolnoye	An-2R	CCCP-31423	Latvia	W/O	3/3	Destroyed by fire after crashing in the Ural region, within the Kazakh SSR territory.	
25 June 1991	(Soviet Union) Rakovka	An-2	Unknown	Unknown	W/O	3/3	Control was lost and the aircraft crashed.	
21 August 1991	(Soviet Union) Poliny Osipenko	L-410UVP	CCCP-67091	Far East	W/O	0/14	Sank back on takeoff while the landing gear was being retracted.	
27 August 1991	(Soviet Union) Guriev	L-410UVP	CCCP-67099	Kazakhstan	W/O	0/6	Forced landing, 42 kilometres (26 mi) out of Guriev (now Atyrau) after running out of fuel. The fuel filler ports had been left open following refueling at Guriev.	
27 September 1991	(Soviet Union) Magadan	L-410UVP	CCCP-67538	Yakut	W/O	0	Premature retraction of the landing gear, during the takeoff run at Magadan Airport.	
3 October 1991	(Angola) Cazombo Airport	An-12BP	CCCP-11120	International	W/O	0	While landing, the wings struck some bushes as the runway was too short and too narrow. The crew found out the airfield was mined; they decided to take off again, but while turning for takeoff the right-side landing gear broke after it got stuck in a pothole, causing the propellers to contact the ground. The aircraft was to be repaired some time later (engines, propellers and technicians were brought over), but the fuselage was severely corroded by then, so the aircraft, which was operating a Lobito–Luena–Cazombo cargo service, was written off instead.	
23 October 1991	(Soviet Union) Shelopugino	An-28	CCCP-28924	East Siberia	W/O	0/13	Hard landing.	
7 November 1991	(Soviet Union) Makhachkala	Yak-40	CCCP-87526	North Caucasus	W/O	51/51	While descending for Makhachkala, visibility worsened. The crew were not aware of the aircraft's position and descended over mountainous terrain. The aircraft crashed into Kukurtbash Mountain at 550 metres (1,800 ft), 23 kilometres (14 mi; 12 nmi) away from Makhachkala. The aircraft was operating an Elista-Makhachkala service as Flight S-519. The aircraft was overloaded.	
8 November 1991	(Soviet Union) Batagay	An-2T	CCCP-79948	Yakut	W/O	0/0	Destroyed by fire while undergoing engine repairs.	
21 November 1991	(Azerbaijan) Khodzavend	Yak-40	Unknown	Azerbaijan	W/O	20	Crashed en route under unspecified circumstances.	
22 November 1991	(Soviet Union) Yartsevo	An-2TP	CCCP-40596	Krasnoyarsk	W/O	0	Force-landed due to engine failure caused by carburetor icing while flying at 1,500 metres (4,900 ft). The aircraft was operating a Podkamennaya Tunguska–Yenseisk passenger service.	
23 November 1991	(Soviet Union) KS-7 Airstrip	An-2R	CCCP-81545	Uzbekistan	W/O	2/4	The aircraft was operating a Kungrad–Komsomolsk-na-Ustyurte–Karakalpakiya service. On board the leg to KS-7 Airstrip were two unauthorized passengers. En route the crew encountered low visibility and poor weather. The crew deviated from the approach pattern and struck a 52-metre-tall (171 ft) drill tower. The aircraft crashed and burned out.	
26 November 1991	(Soviet Union) Bugulma	An-24RV	CCCP-47823	Privolzhsk	W/O	42/42 (Note: There exists a discrepancy over the death toll, as it was claimed it rose to 42 —37 passengers and a crew of 5—, or 41 —37 passengers and a crew of 4—,)	Crashed 800 metres (2,600 ft) out of Bugulma Airport, on approach, following an aborted go-around, likely because of icing on the stabilizer.	
8 December 1991	Unknown	An-2T	CCCP-33137	Yakut	W/O	Unknown	Landed on rough terrain.	
Dissolution of the Soviet Union
30 December 1991	(Russia) Velsk Airport	Yak-40	CCCP-87521	Arkhangelsk	W/O	0/25	After lifting off the runway, the right wing hit the ground. The aircraft struck a tree and then crashed in an embankment and caught fire. The aircraft was overloaded and the takeoff was attempted in poor weather with blowing snow and cross winds.	
3 January 1992	(Tajikistan) Lyakhsh	An-28	CCCP-28706	Tajikistan	W/O	0	Undershot the runway on landing.	
24 January 1992	(Georgia (country)) Batumi	Tu-134A	CCCP-65053	Georgia	W/O	0	Overran the runway on landing at Chorokh Airport.	
9 February 1992	(Kazakhstan) Atyrau	An-24B	CCCP-46816	Kazakhstan	W/O	0/49	Shortly after takeoff from Guryev Airport, an engine failed at 900 metres (3,000 ft) and the aircraft turned around, but to perform a missed approach. Airspeed was lost in icing conditions and the aircraft went into a 6 metres per second (20 ft/s) descent, landed, and slid 418 metres (1,371 ft) on its belly and partially retracted landing gear.	
7 June 1992	(Russia) Moscow	Tu-154	Unknown	Russian International Airlines	None	1/115	The aircraft was hijacked while en route from Grozny to Moscow. The hijacker, who demanded to be taken to Turkey, was killed by security forces at Vnukovo Airport.	
19 June 1992	(Russia) Bratsk Airport	Tu-154B-1	CCCP-85282	Ural	W/O	0/0	CCCP-85234 was operating a Vladivostok-Samara service as Flight 5308 and had landed at Bratsk to refuel, but was grounded by maintenance issues and everyone left the aircraft. That night, CCCP-85282, operating a Ekaterinburg-Vladivostok service as Flight 2889, also stopped at Bratsk to refuel. Ten passengers remained on board CCCP-85282 with the pilot's permission while the remaining 120 left the aircraft and went to the terminal. Refueling of CCCP-85282 began, but the hose disconnected from the tanker. Fuel poured out onto the pump's engine, starting a fire. The engines could not be shut off and fuel continued to pour out onto the apron. Minutes later, CCCP-85282 caught fire, followed by CCCP-85234. Both aircraft burned out, but the 11 on board CCCP-85282 were able to escape. The truck driver drove the burning tankers away from the scene, but he had suffered severe burn injuries and did not survive. The hose disconnected due to errors by the operator, who was drunk.	
19 June 1992	(Russia) Bratsk Airport	Tu-154B-1	CCCP-85234	Privolzhsk	W/O	0/0		
21 June 1992	(Russia) Poltavskiy	An-2R	CCCP-32544	Kazakhstan	W/O	Unknown	Unknown	
8 July 1992	(Russia) Ukrainsky	An-2R	CCCP-07816	Central	W/O	Unknown	Crashed.	
23 August 1992	(Switzerland) Zurich	Tu-154M	CCCP-85670	Russian International Airlines	Repaired	0/145	The aircraft was completing a non-scheduled international Milan–Zurich passenger service as Flight 2267. The approach to Zurich Airport was abandoned due to inclement weather, and one of the wings struck an antenna. The crew managed to land the airplane safely.	
27 August 1992 (Note: The date of occurrence is discrepant.)	(Russia) Ivanovo	Tu-134A	CCCP-65058	Central	W/O	84/84	The aircraft was completing a scheduled Donetsk–Ivanovo passenger service as Flight 2808, when it hit trees on approach to Ivanovo Airport in rain and mist and crashed.	
29 August 1992	(Ukraine) Kharkiv	Tu-134A-3	CCCP-65810	Georgia	W/O	0/58	Overran the runway at Kharkiv Airport following a long landing.	
21 September 1992	(Russia) Kalga Airstrip	An-2R	CCCP-32596	East Siberia	W/O	Unknown	Crashed 11 kilometres (6.8 mi) away from the Kalga Airstrip.	
13 October 1992	(Russia) Vladivostok	Tu-154B-2	CCCP-85528	Belarus	W/O	0/67	Overran the runway at Vladivostok Airport as it failed to get airborne.	
14 October 1992	(Kazakhstan) Kostanay	An-2R	CCCP-07840	Kazakhstan	W/O	0/3	Crashed.	
19 October 1992	(Russia) Ust-Nem	An-28	CCCP-28785	Komi	W/O	15/16	Crashed shortly after takeoff. During takeoff the left engine failed, probably due to snow ingestion. The propeller was feathered, but the aircraft began banking to the left, towards the failed engine. The flaps were retracted, yet too soon, causing a nose-up attitude. The aircraft stalled and crashed at the edge of a forest. Lack of training was also a factor. The aircraft was operating a domestic non-scheduled Ust-Nem–Syktyvkar passenger service as Flight 302.	
7 November 1992	(Russia) Moscow	Il-62M	RA-86703	Unknown	W/O	0	During maintenance at Domodedovo Airport, a fire started in a right wing fuel tank while a valve was being replaced. The fire, caused by an electric lamp, could not be extinguished and the aircraft burned out.	
5 December 1992	(Armenia) Yerevan	Tu-154A	CCCP-85105	Armenia	W/O	0/154	Veered off the runway upon landing at Yerevan Airport.	
30 January 1993	(Russia) Peledui	An-2R	CCCP-40479	Yakut	W/O	0/4	Crashed in snow and flipped over.	
26 September 1993	(Russia) Novoalekseevskaya	An-2R	CCCP-68150	North Caucasus	W/O	Unknown	Crashed.	
22 December 1993	(Russia) Off Uray	An-2TP	CCCP-01410	Tyumen	W/O	0/10	Forced landed 190 kilometres (120 mi) away from Uray.	
25 December 1993	(Russia) Grozny	Tu-154B-2	RA-85296	Unknown	W/O	0/172	Nosegear collapsed upon landing at Grozny Airport in bad weather. The aircraft had been leased to Vnukovo Airlines from Aeroflot.	
8 February 1994	(Russia) Anadyr	An-12B	CCCP-11340	Privolzhsk	W/O	0/11	Overran the runway on landing in fog at Anadyr Airport.	
8 March 1994	(India) Delhi	Il-86	RA-86119	Russian International Airlines	W/O	9	Destroyed by fire as Flight 588 when it was hit by a crashing Boeing 737-200 that was being flown for training purposes at Indira Gandhi International Airport.	
23 March 1994	(Russia) Mezhdurechensk	A310-300	F-OGQS	Russian International Airlines	W/O	75/75	The aircraft was operating an international scheduled Moscow–Hong Kong passenger service as Flight 593, when it crashed en route near Mezhdurechensk, after the auto-pilot partially shut off when the captain's son was allowed to sit in the pilot seat and handle the controls.	
7 May 1994	(Russia) Arkhangelsk	Tu-134A-3	RA-65976	Unknown	W/O	0/62	Landed at Talagi Airport with the main starboard landing gear retracted, veering to the right and coming to rest off the runway.	
25 June 1994	(Russia) Kirensk	An-2P	CCCP-70263	East Siberia	W/O	0/8	Crashed on takeoff.	
14 July 1994	(Russia) Blagoveshchensk	L-410UVP	RA-67470	Unknown	W/O	0/14	One of the main landing gears ran into a ditch while taxiing at Blagoveshchensk Airport.	
30 November 1994	(Russia) Grozny	Tu-134A-3	CCCP-65858	Unknown	W/O	0/0	Destroyed at Grozny Airport during a Russian raid amid the First Chechen War along with four other Tu-134s.	
8 October 1996	(Italy) San Francesco al Campo	An-124-100	RA-82069	Russian International Airlines	W/O	4/23	Struck trees and houses following a go-around, with the flaps at take-off position. The aircraft was leased by Aeroflot and was being ferried empty to Torino from Moscow as Flight 9981.	
1998	(Russia) Sheremetyevo Airport	Il-86	RA-86080	Russian International Airlines	W/O	0	Hard landing.	
11 November 1998	(United States) Anchorage	Il-62M	RA-86564	Russian International Airlines	W/O	0/12	An Asiana Airlines Boeing 747-400 damaged both the starboard wing and the tail of the aircraft as it was standing at Ted Stevens Anchorage International Airport.	

== See also ==
- Aeroflot accidents and incidents
- Aeroflot accidents and incidents in the 1950s
- Aeroflot accidents and incidents in the 1960s
- Aeroflot accidents and incidents in the 1970s
- Aeroflot accidents and incidents in the 1980s
- Transport in Russia
- Transport in the Soviet Union
