= Aeroflot accidents and incidents =

Founded in 1923, Aeroflot, the flag carrier and largest airline of Russia (formerly the Soviet Union), has had a high number of fatal crashes, with a total of 8,231 passengers dying in Aeroflot crashes according to the Aircraft Crashes Record Office, mostly during the Soviet era, about five times more than any other airline. From 1946 to 1989, the carrier was involved in 721 incidents. On the other hand, from 1995 to 2025, the carrier was involved in merely 11 incidents, out of which only 3 caused any fatalities. In 2013, AirlineRatings.com reported that five of the ten aircraft models involved in the highest numbers of fatal accidents were old Soviet models.

Aviation columnist Patrick Smith stated that Aeroflot's raw crash totals including the Soviet Union era may not give a total picture of the airline's safety record, because the airline was divided into pieces after the conclusion of the Soviet era; according to Smith, the size of Aeroflot's Soviet era operation was the equivalent of all of the large airlines in the United States at the time combined. In the Soviet Union, there was only one airline, that being Aeroflot.

Following is a list of accidents and incidents Aeroflot experienced from 1932 to the present.

== 1930s ==
Date	Location	Aircraft	Tail number	Airline division	Aircraft damage	Fatalities	Description	Refs
26 May 1931	Unknown	ANT-9	СССР-Л104	Unknown	W/O	Unknown	Crashed.	
27 January 1932	(Soviet Union) Tambov	U-2	Unknown	2nd United Aviation School	W/O	2/2	While flying upside down at 800 m (2,600 ft) during a training flight, the aircraft entered an uncontrolled descent and crashed.	
23 February 1932	(Soviet Union) Nizhne-Tambov	PS-5	СССР-Л718	Far East	W/O	16/16	The aircraft was operating a Okha–Nikolaevsk-on-Amur–Nizhne-Tambov–Khabarovsk passenger service. On takeoff from Ohka en route to Nikolaevsk-na-Amur, the aircraft was already overloaded by 336 kg (741 lb) and another 226 kg (498 lb) was added at Nikolaevsk-na-Amur. The now severely overloaded aircraft took off for Nizhne-Tambov. After passing over Sukhanovka at 30–50 m (98–164 ft) and following the Amur River, the aircraft was forced to fly low due to poor visibility and bad weather. While descending for Nizhne-Tambov at 50 m (164 ft), the right wing separated. Control was lost and the aircraft entered a descending clockwise spiral and crashed upside down on the frozen Amur River. During a 1931 overhaul for conversion to an airliner, the right wing was improperly repaired.	
10 May 1932	(Soviet Union) Moscow	ANT-9	СССР-Л128	Research Institute of Aeroflot	W/O	4/11	The aircraft took off from Frunze Central Aerodrome for a test flight. While cruising at 900 m (3,000 ft), the mechanic informed the pilot of an oil leak on the right engine. The pilot began descending and decided to divert to Oktyabrskoye Airfield. On approach, at 125 m (410 ft) and flying at 120 km/h (75 mph) with both remaining engines at full power, the aircraft rolled to the right, stalled and crashed in a forest. The oil leak was caused by a failed hydraulic pump.	
27 October 1932	(Soviet Union) Kulebyakino	SM.62bis	СССР-Z1	East Siberia	W/O	5/7	The aircraft was operating a Irkutsk-Bodaibo cargo service. Some 40 km (25 mi) from Kirensk the weather worsened and visibility was poor from falling snow. The pilot descended, ostensibly to remain visual contact with the ground. Control was lost at 20–30 m (66–98 ft) and the aircraft crashed in the Lena River some 15 km (9.3 mi) southwest of Kirensk. Pilot inexperience was blamed.	
27 January 1933	(Soviet Union) Sverdlovsk	ANT-9	Unknown	Unknown	W/O	0	Crashed.	
8 February 1933	(Soviet Union) Goychay	K-5	СССР-Л481	Transcaucasian	W/O	4/5	The aircraft was operating a Baku-Tiflis (now Tbilisi) passenger service. En route to Ganzhda and Yevlakh the pilot encountered poor visibility due to fog. He descended to maintain visual contact with the ground and followed a rail line. While approaching Goychay at below 30 m (98 ft), the pilot realized that he was facing trees and began a sharp right turn when the aircraft hit trees, partially tearing off the right wing and the aircraft crashed.	
13 February 1933	(Soviet Union) Moscow Region	K-5	СССР-Л455	Moscow Department of Air Lines	W/O	2/2	The aircraft was operating a Moscow-Kharkiv mail flight. Approaching Podolsk, the weather deteriorated and the pilot decided to return to Moscow, but the weather was also poor there. During the approach, at 110–120 m (360–390 ft), the aircraft struck an antenna, partially tearing off the right wing. Control was lost and the aircraft descended and crashed 65 m (213 ft) further on.	
11 May 1933	(Soviet Union) Kontuganovo	K-5	СССР-Л463	Moscow Department of Air Lines	W/O	1/4	The aircraft was operating a Sverdlovsk (now Yekaterinburg)-Yanaul-Kazan passenger service. While cruising at 800 m (2,600 ft), the weather worsened with snow showers, although the weather forecast called for rain. The pilot descended to 300 m (980 ft) and encountered blizzard conditions. The pilot later decided on an emergency landing near Kontuganovo. While circling at 50 m (160 ft), the left wing struck a tall tree and the aircraft crashed. The pilot died of his injuries a few hours later.	
27 June 1933	(Soviet Union) Michurinsk	U-2	CCCP-Ш566	2nd Sep. Training Squadron	W/O	1/1	While flying at 700–750 m (2,300–2,460 ft), the pilot lost control while performing stunts. The aircraft entered a dive and crashed. The inexperienced pilot had become disorientated.	
13 August 1933	(Soviet Union) Balashov	U-2	CCCP-Ш480	3rd United Aviation School	W/O	4	The two aircraft were operating a training flight when they collided. Cause attributed to errors of both pilots.	
13 August 1933	(Soviet Union) Balashov	U-2	CCCP-Ш90	3rd United Aviation School	W/O	4	The two aircraft were operating a training flight when they collided. Cause attributed to errors of both pilots.	
18 August 1933	(Soviet Union) Kazan	ANT-9	CCCP-Л150	Moscow	W/O	0/11	Mid-air collision. The ANT-9 was on a test flight, and after 13 minutes, the pilot decided to return to the airport. On final approach, the aircraft collided with a Polikarpov U-2 (CCCP-S227) that had been completing a local flight. Both aircraft crashed, killing both pilots of the U-2; all on board the ANT-9 only suffered minor injuries.	
5 September 1933	(Soviet Union) Poldasnya	R-6L	СССР-J5	Unknown	W/O	8/8	The aircraft was operating a charter flight from Moscow to Feodosia. En route, the aircraft encountered bad weather. Because of the low visibility, the pilot descended to establish a visual reference with the ground, but the aircraft struck a tree and crashed.	
17 September 1933	(Soviet Union) Moscow	K-5	СССР-Л538	Moscow	W/O	2/2	The aircraft took off from Moscow on a cargo flight. A few minutes after takeoff, at 200–300 m (660–980 ft), the crew encountered vibration and stability problems and decided to return to Moscow. On approach at 150 m (490 ft) the aircraft entered an uncontrolled descent and crashed. The tail had separated due to unexplained vibration; the exact cause of the crash was never determined.	
17 November 1933	(Soviet Union) Bataysk	K-5	СССР-Л406	1st United Aviation School	W/O	3/3	Shortly after takeoff, the crew encountered engine problems and the aircraft climbed to 70 m (230 ft) before beginning a descent. The pilot attempted to find a spot for a forced landing but the aircraft nosed down and crashed and caught fire. The cause of the engine problem was not determined, but a faulty carburetor was blamed and the loss of control was caused by pilot error. The aircraft was operating a training flight.	
24 December 1933	(Soviet Union) Balashov	R-5	CCCP-Ш629	3rd United Aviation School	W/O	0/2	The aircraft was operating a training flight. After takeoff, the crew performed two turns and then climbed to 350 m (1,150 ft), eventually entering clouds. Five minutes after takeoff, the aircraft entered a high-speed descent. The crew attempted to regain control, but the aircraft struck ground and crashed upside down.	
11 March 1934	(Soviet Union) Zalivnaya	Stal-2	СССР-Л1127	Transaviation Spec. Det.	W/O	2/2	The aircraft was on a Moscow-Tashkent delivery flight. During the Samara-Orenburg leg, the engine failed and the crew made an emergency landing. Due to poor weather, technical problems and awaiting fuel from Orenburg, the crew was stuck for 18 days. Following repairs, the aircraft took off to return to Samara. But at 250–300 m (820–980 ft), the engine failed again. While attempting an emergency landing, the aircraft stalled and crashed.	
12 March 1934	(Soviet Union) Povarovo	R-5	СССР-Л1502	Northern Directorate of Air Lines (Transaviatsiya)	W/O	2/2	The aircraft was operating a Moscow-Leningrad mail flight. A few minutes after takeoff, weather conditions worsened with low ceiling and intermittent snow. At 100 m (330 ft) the aircraft entered a right turn, descended and crashed.	
26 April 1934	(Soviet Union) Ak-Su	Stal-2	СССР-Л1125	Central Asian	W/O	5/5	At 1,000 m (3,300 ft) the aircraft entered an uncontrolled descent and crashed. The aircraft was overloaded.	
28 April 1934	(Soviet Union) Akytubinsk	SP	СССР-Л1015	Kazakhstan	W/O	0/1	The aircraft took off from Akytubinsk on a mail flight. Ten minutes after takeoff the pilot decided to return because he thought there was a loss of hydraulic pressure. Due to an incorrect approach configuration, the pilot landed with a tailwind and the aircraft struck a parked U-2SP (CCCP-Л1018) after landing. The pilot escaped with only minor injuries.	
18 May 1934	(Soviet Union) Karatkansk	R-5	СССР-Л1075	West Siberia	W/O	1/1	The aircraft was operating a Novosibirsk-Omsk mail flight. After passing over Tatarsk, weather conditions worsened with low ceiling, heavy rain and strong winds. After entering clouds, the pilot became disorientated and attempted to return to Tatarsk, but the local beacon was not working due to poor weather. While attempting an emergency landing, the aircraft crashed.	
6 June 1934	(Soviet Union) Optukha	R-5	СССР-Л787	Moscow	W/O	1/1	The aircraft was operating a Moscow-Kharkiv mail flight. While at 50 m (160 ft) over the valley of Oka, weather deteriorated with havy clouds, drizzle and low ceiling. After completing two turns, the pilot did not realize that he was flying too low and the aircraft crashed.	
10 June 1934	(Soviet Union) Kuschevka	R-5	СССР-Л1528	Ukraine	W/O	1/1	The aircraft was operating a Mineralnye Vody-Armavir-Rostov mail flight. Following technical problems, the pilot was forced to stay overnight in Armavir due to poor weather. The pilot departed Armavir, but while approaching Kutschevka, the aircraft encountered fog and the pilot decided to turn around. While turning around and apparently attempting to maintain visual contact with the ground, the aircraft lost altitude and crashed.	
27 July 1934	(Soviet Union) Balkhash	ANT-9	СССР-Л130	Kazakh	W/O	10/10	The aircraft was operating an Alma-Ata (now Almaty)-Karaganda-Taldykorgan-Balkhash passenger service. On approach to Taldykorgan, the pilot made a series of mistakes and violations and landed the aircraft in a crosswind and the aircraft touched down on one landing gear. A go-around was made and the aircraft landed safely. Approaching Balkhash, the winds picked up. The aircraft lost altitude and touched the ground with the left wing and then hit the ground first with the nose and left engine and then the right engine and right wing. breaking off both engines. The aircraft spun around and came to rest 3 m (9.8 ft) from the first impact site. The fuselage broke in two on impact.	
15 August 1934	(Soviet Union) Irkutsk	SM.62bis	СССР-Х2	East Siberia	W/O	6/7	The aircraft was operating a Irkutsk-Bodaibo passenger service. On the Angara River, the aircraft traveled 100 m (328 ft) and made a 180 degree turn to begin the takeoff. The aircraft rotated and took off despite insufficient speed. Achieving a nose-up attitude, the aircraft struck a two-story house, tearing off the floats after which it stalled and crashed at Transportnaya street; the sole survivor was seriously injured. The aircraft was too close to Irkutsk and the takeoff speed too low.	
4 September 1934	(Soviet Union) Olga Bay	S.55P	СССР-Л997	Far East	W/O	2/13	Following a series of reconnaissance missions over the eastern portion of Primorsky Krai, the crew prepared to return to Vladivostok. Twenty minutes after takeoff, the crew decided to return to refuel. Landing at 140–150 km/h (87–93 mph), the right float struck an object in the water, nearly tearing it off. Water entered the fuselage and the aircraft broke in three and came to rest. The ship Dvinoles rescued all but two passengers.	
27 September 1934	(Soviet Union) Basargechar	SP	СССР-М7	Transcaucasian	W/O	2/2	Following an uneventful flight from Yerevan, the aircraft was on approach when the pilot requested a straight-in approach, which was against procedure that request a circuit vertical to the airport. Because of this, the pilot deviated from the approach path. At 50 m (160 ft), the pilot attempted a go-around, but the engine failed. Altitude was lost and the aircraft crashed.	
5 October 1934	Unknown	PS-4	СССР-Л417	Unknown	Unknown	0	Crashed.	
15 November 1934	(Soviet Union) Kaduy	R-5	СССР-Л786	East Siberia	W/O	1/1	The aircraft was operating an Irkutsk-Krasnoyarsk mail flight. After passing Nizhneudinsk, the pilot flew into a blizzard. He descended to maintain visual contact with the ground and decided to return to Nizhneudinsk. At about 20 m (66 ft), the aircraft struck the top of a larch tree with its right wing and continued for 50 m (160 ft) before it crashed.	
25 December 1934	(Soviet Union) Ananino	K-5	СССР-Л544	Ural	W/O	2/2	The aircraft was operating a Yanaul-Sverdlovsk service. Weather conditions worsened en route and visibility was very low due to fog. Approaching Ananino the aircraft was at 4 m (13 ft) flying over houses. During a turn the aircraft stalled and crashed.	
11 January 1935	(Soviet Union) Aktyubinsk	R-5	СССР-Л1522	North Caucasus	W/O	2/2	The aircraft was operating a Guryev-Aktyubinsk service. En route, weather conditions worsened and the pilot encountered low visibility due to snow. While flying over an oil field, the pilot became disorientated and could not locate his position. He began a sharp right turn, apparently to return, when the aircraft struck he ground and crashed. Neither the pilot nor the aircraft were certified to fly.	
25 February 1935	(Soviet Union) Dnipropetrovsk	K-5	СССР-Л619	Ukraine	W/O	1/2	The aircraft was being ferried back to Dnipropetrovsk (now Dnipro) from Kryvyi Rih following a mail flight. Approaching Dnipropetrovsk the crew encountered thick fog with very low visibility. The pilot descended, probably to maintain visual reference with the ground, but the aircraft struck a metal high-tension power pylon, lost altitude and crashed.	
26 February 1935	(Soviet Union) Kazan	R-5	СССР-Л1057	Moscow	W/O	1/1	The aircraft was operating the second leg of a Sverdlovsk-Yanaul-Kazan-Moscow mail service. The pilot stayed overnight in Yanaul, departing the next day for Kazan. At Kazan, weather worsened with limited visibility due to fog. At 70–80 m (230–260 ft) on approach, the aircraft struck a 105 m (344 ft)-tall radio antenna, puncturing the left fuel tank and starting a fire. The aircraft continued for 200 m (660 ft) before it crashed and burned out. The inexperienced pilot had descended too low during the approach.	
10 March 1935	(Soviet Union) Slobodshikovo	Stal-2	СССР-Л1170	Northern	W/O	3/3	The aircraft was operating an Arkhangelsk-Kotlas-Syktyvkar passenger service. Approaching Korovinskaya the pilot encountered sudden heavy snow for a period of 15-20 minutes at a time. Visibility was very poor, but the pilot decided not to return and continued. A few minutes later while flying in whiteout conditions, the aircraft struck the ground and crashed.	
8 June 1935	(Soviet Union) Ivanovka	R-5	СССР-Ш913	3rd United Aviation School	W/O	2/2	The aircraft was operating a training flight from Balashov to Saratov. The crew was told to stay above 300 m (980 ft) and not to enter clouds. After takeoff, flying south, the aircraft entered clouds. Control was lost and the aircraft crashed.	
22 June 1935	(Soviet Union) Mount Kazbek	R-5	СССР-Л1734	Transcaucasian	W/O	2/2	The aircraft was operating a Mineralnye Vody-Tiflis (now Tbilisi) mail flight. After passing the Krestovy Pass, the crew encountered poor weather. The pilot decided to return and began turning, but the pilot became disorientated. Assuming that he passed the highest mountain, the pilot descended and the aircraft struck the side of Mount Kazbek.	
26 June 1935	(Soviet Union) Lazarev	S.55P	СССР-Л840	Far East	W/O	12/12	Struck a mountain while flying too low after the pilot became disorientated. The aircraft was operating a Aleksandrovsk-Sakhalinsky–Khabarovsk passenger service. Wreckage found in September 1935 and located again in August 1985. A 2015-2016 expedition to the crash site found skeletal remains and these were buried in a Khabarovsk cemetery in 2016.	
5 July 1935	(Soviet Union) Tokmok	R-5	СССР-Л1905	Central Asian	W/O	1/1	After a successful mail flight from Frunze to Karakol, the pilot wanted to return to Frunze, but weather conditions were poor. In a hurry, he took off for Frunze, but never made it there. Wreckage was found 35 km (22 mi) southeast of Tokmok at 2,800 m (9,200 ft) in the Chon-Almaly valley.	
8 July 1935	(Soviet Union) Syrt	R-5	СССР-Л1890	North Kazakh	W/O	1/1	The aircraft was operating a Moscow-Kuybyshev (now Samara)-Orenburg-Tashkent mail flight. During the Kuibyshev-Orenburg leg the pilot encountered poor weather with rain and thunderstorms. He decided to continue, descending to 400–500 m (1,300–1,600 ft). Control was lost and the aircraft crashed.	
30 July 1935	(Soviet Union) Faizobod	F.13	СССР-Л19	Central Asian	W/O	1/1	The aircraft was operating a Stalinabad (now Dushanbe)-Garm cargo flight. After takeoff the pilot found it difficult to gain altitude and while over mountainous terrain, the aircraft entered clouds. While in a valley the pilot attempted to turn around, but the aircraft crashed. The overloaded aircraft was flying too low.	
27 September 1935	(Soviet Union) Arsen'evo	R-5	СССР-Л1902	Moscow	W/O	1/1	The aircraft was operating a Moscow-Kharkiv mail flight. While flying between Tula and Orel the pilot became disorientated because the light beacon was not working (they were turned off after midnight). After four hours in the air the pilot attempted an emergency landing but control was lost and the aircraft crashed.	
25 November 1935	(Soviet Union) Mount Kyzyltas	P-5	СССР-Л1980	South Kazakh	W/O	4/4	The aircraft was operating a Balkhash-Karaganda passenger flight. En route weather worsened and visibility was poor due to snow and fog. The pilot continued instead of returning to Balkhash. After flying at night for four hours the aircraft struck the side of Mount Kyzyltas. To complicate matters, Balkhash Airport received an erroneous message that the aircraft had landed in Karaganda and it took two days to realize the information was wrong. The exhausted pilot had made a navigation error.	
16 December 1935	(Soviet Union) Posolskoye	P-5	СССР-Л1555	East Siberia	W/O	2/2	The aircraft was operating the first leg of an Irkutsk-Ulan-Ude–Mogocha cargo flight, but never arrived at Ulan-Ude. A search for the aircraft began, and three days later, the pilot of P-5 CCCP-Л1909 noticed a burned-out aircraft on an ice floe in Lake Baikal some 10–12 km (6.2–7.5 mi) from Posolskoye. On 20 December the steamship Krugobaikalets set out for the site. No signs of the crew were found at the site, but footprints were found 2 km (1.2 mi) in the direction of Podolskoye before disappearing, then reappearing 5–6 mi (8.0–9.7 km) in the same direction. The steps of the two sets of footprints showed nothing unusual. Evidence of the two relieving themselves was found, then the footprints stopped at hidden ice holes, where the crew probably fell through the ice. The aircraft had force-landed due to an engine fire.	
30 December 1935	(Soviet Union) Troitskoye	SP	СССР-Л971	Far East	W/O	1/1	Disappeared during a Khabarovsk–Troitskoye–Komsomolsk-on-Amur mail flight. The wrecked aircraft was found on 13 April 1938 by hunters rotting away in a swamp 52 km (32 mi) from the mouth of the Khungari River on its left bank. The pilot was injured in the crash, but his body was not found as it had been hidden by the hunters. The aircraft was likely found and looted; the pilot either died in the crash or was killed by hunters. The pilot had become disorientated in strong winds and decided to make an emergency landing. Despite a normal touchdown, the aircraft struck a hill, nosed down and crashed.	
31 December 1935	Unknown	Stal-2	СССР-Л1196	Unknown	W/O	0	Crashed. Exact date unknown.	
7 January 1936	(Soviet Union) Khorog	R-5	СССР-Л1571	Central Asian	W/O	1/3	Overturned after landing next to the runway. The pilot had adopted an incorrect approach configuration and missed the runway. Due to complete a Stalinabad-Khorog passenger flight.	
10 January 1936	(Soviet Union) Doshtak	R-5	СССР-Л1532	Central Asian	W/O	1/2	The aircraft was operating a Khorugh-Stalinabad passenger flight. An hour into the flight, the pilot got lost after entering a valley and could not locate his position. As night fell the pilot saw the lights of Doshtak and decided to land but the aircraft struck the side of a mountain. The pilot had failed to use his charts properly.	
22 January 1936	(Soviet Union) Lukolovo	R-5	СССР-Л1738	Far East	W/O	4/4	The aircraft was operating an Okha–Aleksandrovsk-Sakhalin passenger service. Fifteen minutes into the flight, weather worsened and visibility was poor due to snow. The pilot descended and continued along the shore. In the low visibility, the pilot did not realize that the aircraft was too low and while in a slight turn the aircraft crashed in an icy area in the Tatar Strait.	
25 January 1936	(Soviet Union) Novgorod	SP	СССР-Л1781	Northern	W/O	2/2	The aircraft was operating a charter flight from Novgorod to Leningrad (now Saint Petersburg). After takeoff the aircraft entered clouds and the pilot became disorientated and realized he was flying towards Kresttsy and not Leningrad. Despite this, the pilot attempted to return to Novgorod, but control was lost and the aircraft crashed.	
6 March 1936	(Soviet Union) Tyr	R-5	СССР-Л1078	Far East	W/O	0/1	The aircraft was operating a Khabarovsk–Komsomolsk-on-Amur–Nizhnetambovskoye–Bogorodskoye–Nikolayevsk-on-Amur cargo flight. During the final leg, weather quickly worsened and visibility was less than 1 km (0.62 mi) due to snow. The pilot attempted an emergency landing, but a wing struck the ground and the aircraft crashed. The pilot was injured, but survived.	
21 June 1936	(Soviet Union) Aleksandrovsk-Sakhalin	S.55P	СССР-Л996	Far East	W/O	1/7	The aircraft was due to begin a Aleksandrovsk-Sakhalin–Viakhtu–Khabarovsk passenger service. The takeoff was delayed several times due to swells and strong winds. The crew also noted floating logs in the water. That evening, when the weather cleared up, the crew decided to take off in a headwind. During the takeoff roll, the aircraft struck floating logs, partially tearing off both floats, nosed down and crashed in the water. One passenger drowned while six others were quickly rescued.	
22 July 1936	(Soviet Union) Mariupol	SP	СССР-Л2030	Azov-Black Sea Caucasus	W/O	2/3	The aircraft was on a special cargo flight to deliver spare parts for combine harvesters to Ukrainian farmers. Several landings were made at Dnipropetrovsk (now Dnipro) and Zaporizhia and then the pilot landed at the 'Azov' sovkhoz (60 km (37 mi) from Mariupol). The next night, the pilot took off with full fuel tanks, two passengers and a load of spare parts. The aircraft took off after a 60 m (200 ft) roll. At a height of 50–60 m (160–200 ft) the pilot turned left to pass over the house where he slept the night before when the aircraft rolled to the left, struck the house and crashed.	
27 July 1936	(Soviet Union) Kulob	ANT-9	СССР-Л192	Uzbek-Tajik	W/O	6/6	The aircraft was completing a Stalinabad (now Dushanbe)-Kulob passenger service. Following a downwind leg to Kulob Airport, while flying over the runway at 10 m (33 ft), the pilot performed a go-around. The aircraft climbed to 30 m (98 ft) in a nose-up attitude, then stalled and crashed and burned out. Pilot error was blamed.	
31 July 1936	Unknown	PS-4	СССР-Л416	Unknown	W/O	0	Crashed.	
31 July 1936	(Soviet Union) Kuybyshev	R-5	СССР-Л1918	North Kazakh	W/O	1/1	The aircraft was operating a Aktyubinsk (now Aktobe)-Kuybyshev (now Samara)-Moscow mail flight. On approach to Kuybyshev the pilot made a half-circle to reach the runway, but realized his position was incorrect. He began a go-around when he saw the chimney of a foundry. While attempting to gain altitude, the aircraft struck the chimney and crashed.	
4 August 1936	(Soviet Union) Malmyzh	ANT-7	СССР-Л2122	Far East	W/O	6/10	The aircraft was operating a Aleksandrovsk-Sakhalinsky–Nizhnetambovskoye–Khabarovsk passenger service. The crew did not receive any weather bulletins for the route and destination before takeoff. Several instruments, such as the variometer, path finder and artificial horizon also did not work. Passing over Komsomolsk, the weather deteriorated with low clouds, forcing the pilot to descend to 150 m (490 ft). Later, storms forced the pilot to descend further and eventually decided to land on the Amur River. On final approach the pilot noticed an island and began a sharp left turn when the left float struck the water. The aircraft cartwheeled and crashed in the river off Malmyzh.	
30 October 1936	(Soviet Union) Mineralnye Vody	R-5	СССР-Л1706	Azov-Black Sea Caucasus	W/O	1/1	Shortly after takeoff, the aircraft climbed to 25 m (82 ft) and the pilot began a right turn when the aircraft stalled and crashed. The cause was not determined, but the pilot probably hurried his departure to allow another aircraft to depart immediately behind him. The aircraft was also flying too slow during the first turn. Due to begin a Mineralnye Vody–Rostov-on-Don cargo flight.	
21 November 1936	(Soviet Union) Kulob	R-5	СССР-Л1892	Uzbek-Tajik	W/O	1/1	The aircraft was operating a Kulob-Stalinabad cargo flight. The pilot circled over the airport to gain altitude and then set off for Stalinabad. Ten minutes later, at 300 m (980 ft), the engine failed. Due to unsuitable terrain, an emergency landing was not possible. The aircraft crashed out of control in hilly terrain.	
10 December 1936	(Soviet Union) Sukhotinka	R-5	СССР-Ш869	2nd Civil Pilot School	W/O	2/2	The aircraft was on a training flight from Tambov to Balashov. Some 15-20 minutes into the flight, while over Sukhotinka, the aircraft was following a road at low altitude when it entered clouds. The aircraft rolled to the left, descended to the ground and crashed.	
26 December 1936	(Soviet Union) Mount Akh-Dag	R-5	СССР-М50	Transcaucasian	W/O	1/1	The aircraft was operating a Basargechar-Yerevan cargo flight. While in clouds over the Akhmangan Mountains, control was lost and the aircraft struck the side of Mount Akh-Dag. A search was initiated but suspended on 15 January 1937; wreckage was found on 26 August 1937. The pilot had become disorientated while flying in clouds.	
9 February 1937	(Soviet Union) Vladivostok	SP	CCCP-Л2095	Far East	W/O	1/1	Approaching Vladivostok from the north, the pilot encountered poor weather with heavy snow. Flying low in limited visibility, the aircraft struck two trees and crashed. Due to complete an Iman-Vladivostok mail service.	
10 February 1937	(Soviet Union) Chechen-Ingush ASSR	ANT-9	CCCP-Л167	Transcaucasian	W/O	1/2	The aircraft was being ferried from Tbilisi to Moscow for repairs. Despite low clouds, the aircraft took off for Grozny. Low clouds forced the pilot to fly low and just before reaching Grozny, the aircraft entered fog. The pilot turned around to exit the fog and after leaving the fog he turned around again to fly to Mineralnye Vody, although he had permission to only fly to Grozny. The aircraft again entered fog and was able to climb out, but the crew noticed that the instruments were failing. Realizing that flying blind was impossible, the pilot began a gentle descent. Distracted with monitoring instruments, the pilot did not realize that the aircraft was approaching the ground and it crashed into the top of a low ridge.	
18 February 1937	(Soviet Union) Orlik	R-5	CCCP-Л1731	North Kazakh	W/O	2/2	The aircraft was operating a Uralsk-Guryev cargo flight. Weather conditions worsened en route and the crew made an emergency landing near Kalmykovo. About an hour later the aircraft took off again as visibility had improved. The aircraft never arrived at Guryev; wreckage was found near Orlik.	
27 May 1937	(Soviet Union) Alkakhatki	R-5	CCCP-Ш938	2nd United Pilot School	W/O	2/2	The aircraft as operating a training flight. While cruising at 1,000 m (3,300 ft) in good weather, the aircraft began to break apart, after which it entered an uncontrolled descent and crashed. The student pilot probably made an error with the power lever while flying at 180 km/h (110 mph), causing the aircraft to reach 260 kilometres per hour (160 mph) and overspeed. The aircraft was not certified to fly over 210 km/h (130 mph).	
27 June 1937	(Soviet Union) Zaporozhye Airport	ANT-9	CCCP-Л176	Moscow	W/O	11	Collided on the runway with a PL-5 during takeoff. The PL-5 departed the airport for Moscow. A few minutes later for reasons unknown, the PL-5 decided to return. Meanwhile, the ANT-9 was preparing for the second leg of a Simferopol-Zaporozhye-Moscow passenger service. The PL-5 then decided to land for unknown reasons without ATC permission while the ANT-9 began takeoff on the same runway, also without ATC permission. Both aircraft collided.	
27 June 1937	(Soviet Union) Zaporozhye Airport	PL-5	CCCP-И93	Unknown	W/O	11	Collided on the runway with a PL-5 during takeoff. The PL-5 departed the airport for Moscow. A few minutes later for reasons unknown, the PL-5 decided to return. Meanwhile, the ANT-9 was preparing for the second leg of a Simferopol-Zaporozhye-Moscow passenger service. The PL-5 then decided to land for unknown reasons without ATC permission while the ANT-9 began takeoff on the same runway, also without ATC permission. Both aircraft collided.	
9 July 1937	(Soviet Union) Alkakhatki	R-5	CCCP-Ш630	1st Aviation School	W/O	2/2	During a training flight, the pilot performed stunts at 800 m (2,600 ft). Control was lost and the aircraft entered a dive and crashed.	
10 July 1937	(Soviet Union) Nizhne Kazache	Stal-3	CCCP-Л1232	Moscow	W/O	1/5	The aircraft was operating the second leg of a Moscow-Yelets-Voronezh-Astrakhan passenger service. Fifteen minutes after takeoff from Yelets, the engine developed problems. The pilot descended and attempted an emergency landing in a rye field, but the aircraft struck an embankment, breaking off the landing gear and crashed. The engine failure was caused by failure of connecting rods on cylinders two and six due to use of too low octane fuel and the wrong oil.	
6 August 1937	(Kingdom of Romania) Herina	DC-2-152	URSS-M25	International	W/O	6/6	Crashed after a passenger lit a cigarette in the toilet, where avgas fumes had accumulated. The aircraft was operating an international scheduled Prague–Cluj–Moscow passenger service.	
17 September 1937	(Soviet Union) Irkutsk	U-2	CCCP-Т190	East Siberia	W/O	2	Both aircraft were on training flights, and each aircraft had their own training zone. Inexplicably, the pilot of CCCP-Т118 changed his heading and left his training zone, colliding with CCCP-Т190. Both aircraft entered a dive and crashed.	
17 September 1937	(Soviet Union) Irkutsk	U-2	CCCP-Т118	East Siberia	W/O	2	Both aircraft were on training flights, and each aircraft had their own training zone. Inexplicably, the pilot of CCCP-Т118 changed his heading and left his training zone, colliding with CCCP-Т190. Both aircraft entered a dive and crashed.	
10 October 1937	(Soviet Union) Drachevka	R-5	CCCP-Л1538	Moscow	W/O	0/1	The aircraft was operating a Kharkiv-Moscow mail flight. Fifty minutes into the flight, the engine began to vibrate. A fuel smell spread through the cabin and the engine caught fire. The pilot bailed out and the aircraft dove into the ground and crashed and burned out. The fire was caused by a broken fuel line; this line had been previously repaired but the hose used to seal the line had been corroded by the fuel and it failed.	
12 November 1937	(Soviet Union) Chardzhou	PS-9	CCCP-Л163	Turkmenistan	W/O	11/11	Four to five minutes after an uneventful takeoff, at 400–500 m (1,300–1,600 ft), the right engine quit. The aircraft began to turn right and the pilot corrected it. The pilot decided to return to Chardzhou (now Türkmenabat) and performed a left turn. Concerned that the aircraft might not reach the airport, the pilot performed a right turn, but because the right engine was not working, this caused a loss of control. The aircraft entered a dive at 150–200 m (490–660 ft) and crashed and burned out; the engine failure was probably caused by improper maintenance. The aircraft was operating a Chardzhou–Urgench passenger service.	
16 November 1937	(Soviet Union) Kharkiv	K-5	CCCP-Л561	Moscow	W/O	2/2	On approach to Kharkiv, visibility was poor due to fog, yet the crew continued the descent. The aircraft struck a 60 m (200 ft)-high chimney of a brickyard, rolled to the right, descended and crashed. Due to complete a Moscow-Orel-Kharkiv cargo flight.	
29 December 1937	(Soviet Union) Brovary	Stal-3	CCCP-Л1228	Ukraine	W/O	4/7	The aircraft was on a test flight following repairs. After takeoff, at around 100 m (330 ft), the crew performed a series of five turns when the aircraft rolled to the right, descended and crashed. The speed had dropped too much during the last turn.	
26 January 1938	(Soviet Union) Kichik-Dekhna	R-5	CCCP-Л1616	Transcaucasian	W/O	2/2	While flying north during a training flight, the crew encountered low visibility in low clouds. The pilot saw a mountain and attempted to gain altitude, but the aircraft struck the mountain.	
20 February 1938	(Soviet Union) Karataly	R-Z	CCCP-Л2398	South Kazakh	W/O	1/1	The aircraft was operating a Karaganda-Balkhash mail flight. En route the aircraft struck the side of a mountain in thick fog. Wreckage found on 8 March 1938.	
9 April 1938	(Soviet Union) Shaki	PS-9	СССР-Л190	Transcaucasian	W/O	3/3	While approaching Shaki inbound from Yevlakh during a cargo flight, the aircraft entered fog. The pilot decided to return but the aircraft crashed on the side of a mountain.	
18 May 1938	(Soviet Union) Arkhangelsk	G-1	СССР-Н122	Unknown	W/O	4/16	Spiraled out of control and crashed in the Dvina River following engine failure. The aircraft was operating a survey flight.	
17 August 1938	(Soviet Union) Lake Onega	MP-1bis	СССР-Л2550	Northern	W/O	7/7	Broke up in mid-air and crashed in Lake Onega near Suisarri Island. The aircraft was operating a Shunga-Petrozavodsk passenger service.	
19 August 1938	(Sweden) Bromma Airport	ANT-35bis	URSS-M131	International	W/O	0	Failed to lift up and overran the runway. Due to begin a Stockholm-Saint Petersburg passenger service.	
19 August 1938	(Soviet Union) Krasnoborsk	PR-5	CCCP-Л2180	33rd Sep. Air Det.	W/O	0/2	The aircraft was operating a Kotlas-Arkhangelsk service. Some 40 km (25 mi) from Kotlas, the pilot flew into thunderstorms. Instead of returning, the pilot decided to continue, but lightning began striking around him. Disorientated and scared, he shut down the magneto and decided to make an emergency landing, but ultimately decided to continue. But because he shut off the magneto, the engine failed to start. The aircraft crashed in a field and struck trees.	
1 September 1938	(Soviet Union) Novoarkhangelsk	Stal-3	CCCP-Л1260	Ukraine	W/O	3/3	The aircraft was operating a Kiev-Odessa passenger service. Eighty-seven minutes into the flight, at cruise, the aircraft was approaching storms (which were not forecast) when the right wing failed and separated. The aircraft entered an uncontrolled descent and crashed. Cause attributed to a design defect.	
1 September 1938	(Soviet Union) Novoarkhangelsk	R-5	CCCP-Л1900	West Siberia	W/O	1/1	Before the flight, the pilot learned that weather conditions were deteriorating en route. Despite this, the pilot took off on a Novosibirsk-Omsk cargo service. Immediately after takeoff, the aircraft entered clouds and fog. The pilot continued for five minutes until the aircraft crashed. The inexperienced pilot probably became disorientated and lost control of the aircraft.	
1 September 1938	(Soviet Union) Bataysk	U-2	CCCP-Ш924	1st Aviation School	W/O	2	Both aircraft were operating training flights. CCCP-Ш924 was following CCCP-Л956 when the first aircraft slowed down so the second aircraft could approach. At around 40 m (130 ft) CCCP-Л956 began a left turn when it collided with CCCP-Ш924. Both aircraft crashed. ATC and crew errors were blamed.	
1 September 1938	(Soviet Union) Bataysk	U-2	CCCP-Л956	1st Aviation School	W/O	2	Both aircraft were operating training flights. CCCP-Ш924 was following CCCP-Л956 when the first aircraft slowed down so the second aircraft could approach. At around 40 m (130 ft) CCCP-Л956 began a left turn when it collided with CCCP-Ш924. Both aircraft crashed. ATC and crew errors were blamed.	
5 September 1938	(Soviet Union) Salyan	AP	CCCP-А774	Azerbaijan	W/O	1/3	The aircraft conducted several crop spraying flights in the area of Ajikabul. The pilot allowed two passengers on board and flew some touring flights before having lunch and drinking vodka. He took off again and during a low pass, a horse was spooked, injuring a young boy. After landing, the pilot heard of this and transferred the boy to a hospital in Salyan. On approach, the aircraft was not aligned with the runway and a go-around was performed, but the aircraft stalled and crashed.	
23 September 1938	(Soviet Union) Napareuli	PS-40	CCCP-Л2446	Georgia	W/O	3/3	The aircraft was operating a Tbilisi–Rostov-on-Don–Moscow cargo flight. Radio contact was lost 33 minutes into the flight; the aircraft had struck the side of a mountain 22 km (14 mi) north-northeast of Napareuli. Wreckage was found on 28 October 1938; the aircraft had drifted off course due to strong winds. ATC and Aeroflot were held responsible for the crash.	
10 October 1938	(Soviet Union) Tbilisi	R-5	CCCP-Л1560	Georgia	W/O	0/2	The aircraft took off to locate a PS-40 that had gone missing on 23 September. After takeoff the aircraft entered clouds, but was able to climb above the cloud layer and continue after a few minutes. However, surrounding mountains remained shrouded in cloud and the pilot decided to return. Control was lost while descending through clouds and the aircraft dove into the ground and crashed. The crew had not checked weather conditions before takeoff.	
13 October 1938	(Soviet Union) Naurskaya	AP	CCCP-А988	Azov-Black Sea Caucasus	W/O	4/4	Before returning to Grozny, the pilot invited three farmers on board for a tour. After takeoff, at 35 m (115 ft), the pilot began a sharp left turn when the aircraft stalled and crashed and burned out.	
4 November 1938	(Soviet Union) Kokpekty	R-5	CCCP-Л1622	South Kazakh	W/O	2/3	The aircraft was operating the second leg of a Zaysan–Kokpekty–Semipalatinsk passenger service. The pilot took off from Kokpekty without information about weather conditions. A few minutes after takeoff the pilot entered snow and decided to return, but too late. Approaching Kokpekty the aircraft was too low; the pilot saw a hill and began turning, but the aircraft crashed.	
10 December 1938	(Soviet Union) Aramil	K-5	CCCP-Л523	West Siberia	W/O	0/6	The aircraft took off from Sverdlovsk (now Yekaterinburg) with cargo, mail and three passengers. Just minutes after takeoff the engine failed. The crew reduced altitude and attempted to perform an emergency landing, but the aircraft crashed. The engine failure was caused by a broken crankshaft due to excessive strain on the engine as the aircraft had been overloaded.	
20 December 1938	(Soviet Union) Ajikabul	PR-5	CCCP-Л2171	Azerbaijan	W/O	0/1	En route to Yevlakh from Baku at 400 m (1,300 ft) during a cargo flight, the pilot encountered fog and climbed to 1,200 m (3,900 ft) when he encountered icing conditions. The pilot decided to return to Baku and descended, but the aircraft struck a hill and crashed.	
26 December 1938	(Soviet Union) Shulakkurgan	AP	CCCP-А701	South Kazakh	W/O	1/1	The aircraft was being ferried back to Shymkent when it encountered worsening weather 45 km (28 mi) south of Shulakkurgan. The aircraft entered clouds and the pilot decided to return, but during a right turn the aircraft struck the side of a mountain and crashed.	
30 January 1939	(Soviet Union) Ust-Bolsheretsk	SP	СССР-Л2295	Far East	W/O	1/1	The aircraft was operating a Petropavlovsk-Kamchatsky–Ust-Bolsheretsk mail flight, the pilot's third flight on this route. After passing Apacha, the weather worsened and visibility dropped to zero in heavy snow. Despite this, the pilot attempted to land at Ust-Bolsheretsk. On approach, control was lost and the aircraft crashed.	
9 February 1939	(Soviet Union) Mozdok	PR-5	СССР-Л2519	Azov-Black Sea Caucasus	W/O	0/1	The aircraft was operating a Grozny–Mineralnye Vody cargo flight. After taking off, the pilot realized that the mountains were shrouded in cloud and changed his route, flying to Gudermes and Mozdok. Approaching Mozdok the pilot encountered low clouds and decided to return, but the aircraft struck a meteo antenna and crashed. The pilot was injured, but survived.	
11 February 1939	(Soviet Union) Omsk	K-5	СССР-Л527	West Siberia	W/O	4/4	On approach to Omsk in light snow, the pilot realized that the aircraft was not aligned with the runway and performed a go-around. After a short circuit the pilot began a second landing attempt, but on short final the aircraft rolled left, descended and crashed near the runway. Due to complete a Tara–Omsk service.	
2 March 1939	(Soviet Union) Mezen	G-2	СССР-Л2524	33rd Sep. Air Det.	W/O	0	The aircraft was operating a Arkhangelsk–Mezen–Naryan-Mar cargo service. Approaching Mezen the crew encountered poor weather with low visibility. The pilot was unable to establish radio contact with Mezen Airport so he asked the co-pilot to check the radio system, but the pilot became distracted in the process and lost visual reference with the horizon. The aircraft descended until it crashed in a snowy field. There were no casualties.	
19 April 1939	(Soviet Union) Imişli	SP	СССР-Л2221	Azerbaijan	W/O	1/1	During a mail flight in Azerbaijan, the pilot encountered poor weather. Control was lost at 240 m (790 ft) in poor visibility and the aircraft dove into the ground. The inexperienced pilot may have been disorientated.	
19 April 1939	(Soviet Union) Leninabad	PR-5	СССР-Л2162	Tajikistan	W/O	1/1	The inexperienced pilot was cleared for takeoff on a Stalinabad (now Dushanbe)-Leninabad (now Khujand) mail flight despite bad weather (thunderstorms) at Leninabad. Control was lost on approach and the aircraft crashed.	
20 July 1939	(Soviet Union) Birakan	ANT-40	СССР-Л2460	Moscow-Irkutsk	W/O	2/3	While flying at 5,000 m (16,000 ft), the aircraft flew into thunderstorms and became uncontrollable due to severe turbulence. The pilot ordered the crew to bail out and the pilot jumped from the aircraft that crashed soon after. The pilot was found alive but the two remaining crew did not bail out and did not survive.	
23 July 1939	(Soviet Union) Birakan	AP	СССР-А1072	Azerbaijan	W/O	1/1	The pilot was completing a crop spraying flight on a cotton field. Control was lost inexplicably and the aircraft nosed down and crashed. The inexperienced pilot was unfamiliar with the area and should not have been flying on his own, which was against procedure.	
2 December 1939	(Soviet Union) Dolgii Buerak	SP	СССР-К200	Moscow	W/O	2/2	The aircraft was being ferried from Ganyushkino to Saratov after dropping off mice for a laboratory in the former city. Approaching Saratov the pilot encountered low visibility and flew over Saratov Airport without visual contact with the ground. He then turned north, but encountered snow. The aircraft entered a right turn, lost altitude and crashed.	

== 2000s ==
- On 21 September 2001, an IL-86 owned and operated by Aeroflot Russian International Airways (RA-86074) landed gear-up at Dubai Airport due to pilot error; all 322 passengers and crew survived, but the aircraft was written off. The aircraft was operating an international scheduled Moscow-Dubai passenger service as Flight 521.
- On 30 June 2008, Tupolev Tu-154M (RA-85667) suffered an uncontained engine failure on takeoff from Pulkovo Airport en route to Moscow as Flight 846; all 112 passengers and crew survived, but the aircraft was written off and was parked at Pulkovo Airport where it was broken up in August 2009. This accident led Aeroflot to retire the Tu-154 from service beginning in late 2008 and completely retired all Tu-154s by 2010 and replaced them with Airbus A320 family aircraft.
- On 14 September 2008, Aeroflot Flight 821 operated by Aeroflot-Nord in a service agreement with Aeroflot as its subsidiary, crashed on approach to Perm Airport, Russia due to pilot error. All 88 people on board; including 6 crew members and 82 passengers, were killed in the crash.
- On 3 June 2009, Boeing 737-500 (VP-BXM) suffered severe damage by a hailstorm while on approach to Simferopol en route from Moscow. The aircraft was written off and stored at Simferopol (with engines removed) where it was last seen in August 2011.

== 2010s ==
- On 3 June 2014, Ilyushin Il-96 RA-96010 was damaged beyond economical repair in a fire while parked at Sheremetyevo International Airport, Moscow.
- On 3 January 2017, Airbus A321 VP-BES overran the runway on landing at Khrabrovo Airport, causing the nosegear to collapse; the aircraft, operating a Moscow–Kaliningrad service as Flight 1008, suffered minor damage.
- On 5 May 2019, Sukhoi Superjet 100 RA-89098 operating a Moscow-Murmansk service as Flight 1492 suffered an in-flight emergency and subsequently caught fire during an emergency landing at Sheremetyevo International Airport, where it burned out. 41 of the 78 people on board were reported dead.

== 2020s ==
- On 1 August 2020, a fuel truck hit the nose of a parked Airbus A321-211 at Moscow's Sheremetyevo Airport, Russia, crushing the driver's cabin and seriously damaging the nose of the aircraft.

== See also ==
- Transport in the Soviet Union
