= List of accidents and incidents involving the Tupolev Tu-154 =

The Tupolev Tu-154 suffered 110 accidents for a total of 2911 fatalities, including 73 hull-losses.

== 1970s ==
19 February 1973
Aeroflot Flight 141, a Tu-154 (CCCP-85023), crashed short of the runway while landing at Ruzyne International Airport in Czechoslovakia, following a sudden, unexplained descent, killing 66 of 100 on board in the first fatal accident involving the Tu-154.

7 May 1973
An Aeroflot Tu-154 (CCCP-85030) force-landed in a forest during a training flight on takeoff from Vnukovo Airport, Moscow; the aircraft had taken off with the spoilers deployed, causing severe vibrations and a loss of power in engines one and three; all four crew survived.

10 July 1974
An EgyptAir Tu-154 (SU-AXB, Nefertiti) stalled and crashed near Cairo during a training flight while practicing an overshoot, killing the six crew.

6 August 1974
An Aeroflot Tu-154 (CCCP-85020) was written off due to structural damage following a hard landing at Vnukovo Airport; after a final ferry flight the aircraft was flown to Kyiv and is now preserved in the Ukraine Government Museum of Aviation.

30 September 1975
Malév Flight 240, a Tu-154B-2 (HA-LCI), crashed in the Mediterranean Sea off Beirut for reasons unknown, killing all 60 on board.

1 June 1976
Aeroflot Flight 418, a Tu-154A (CCCP-85102), struck Mount San Carlos on Bioko Island, Equatorial Guinea, killing all 46 on board; the cause was not determined, but radar failure was blamed.

2 December 1977
A Libyan Arab Airlines Tu-154 (LZ-BTN) force-landed near Benghazi, Libya, due to fuel exhaustion while searching for an alternate airport following a diversion due to fog, killing 59 of 165 on board. The aircraft was one of six Tu-154s leased by Libyan Arab Airlines from Balkan Bulgarian Airlines to fly pilgrims to Mecca for the hajj.

18 February 1978
An Aeroflot Tu-154A (CCCP-85087) burned out while parked at Tolmachevo Airport, Novosibirsk, after an oily rag was left on the cabin heater, which had been switched on and left unattended between flights.

23 March 1978
A Balkan Bulgarian Airlines Tu-154 (LZ-BTB) struck high ground on approach to Damascus Airport, Syria, killing the four crew.

19 May 1978
Aeroflot Flight 6709, a Tu-154B (CCCP-85169), crashed in a field near Maksatikha, Kalinin Oblast, Russia, following triple engine failure after the flight engineer accidentally shut off the automatic transferring of fuel of the sump tank, killing four of 134 on board.

14 November 1978
Aeroflot Flight 212, a Tu-154B-1 (CCCP-85286), overran the runway on takeoff from Arlanda Airport, Stockholm, after the crew failed to select the control system's hydraulic pressure; all 74 on board survived. The aircraft was repaired and returned to service.

27 February 1979
Aeroflot Flight 212, a Tu-154, was hijacked by four people shortly after takeoff from Oslo. The hijackers threatened to blow up the aircraft with kerosene-filled glass bottles. The aircraft flew to Stockholm where the hijackers were overpowered by the crew.

30 June 1979
A Chosonminhang Tu-154B (P-551) stalled and landed hard at Ferihegy International Airport, Budapest, due to pilot error; all 70 on board survived. The aircraft was repaired and returned to service.

1979
An Aeroflot Tu-154B (CCCP-85131) was written off following a mercury spill in the cargo hold; the aircraft was used in the shooting of a film (Ekipazh, "crew") after which it was moved to the Krivyi Rih Aeronautical School.

== 1980s ==
1 March 1980
Aeroflot Flight 3324, a Tu-154A (CCCP-85103), landed hard at Orenburg Airport and broke in two after deviating from the glide path during the approach; all 161 on board survived.

8 July 1980
Aeroflot Flight 4225, a Tu-154B-2 (CCCP-85355), stalled and crashed shortly after takeoff from Alma-Ata Airport after entering a downdraft, killing all 166 on board. The accident remains the deadliest in Kazakhstan.

7 August 1980
A TAROM Tu-154B-1 (YR-TPH) ditched 300 m (980 ft) short of the runway at Nouadhibou Airport due to pilot error, killing one of 168 on board.

8 October 1980
An Aeroflot Tu-154B-2 (CCCP-85321) landed hard at Chita Airport after coming in too high, breaking off the tail section; all 184 on board survived, but the aircraft was obviously written off. The center of gravity was too far forward. photo

13 June 1981
An Aeroflot Tu-154 (CCCP-85029) overran the runway on landing at Bratsk Airport and broke in two, injuring three passengers.

8 September 1981
An Aeroflot Tu-154B-2 (CCCP-85448) burned out during refueling at Tashkent Airport; no casualties.

21 October 1981
Malév Hungarian Airlines Flight 641, a Tu-154B (HA-LCF) landed hard at Ruzyne Airport and broke in two after deploying the spoilers at low altitude following a too-high approach; all 90 on board survived.

16 November 1981
Aeroflot Flight 3603, a Tu-154B-2 (CCCP-85480), crashed 470 m (1,542 ft) short of the runway at Norilsk Airport following a high-speed descent due to pilot error, killing 99 of 167 on board.

27 November 1982
Malév Hungarian Airlines Flight 121, a Tu-154B-2 (HA-LCA), was hijacked by a man posing as a security guard and demanded to be flown to West Berlin. The hijacker was overpowered after being convinced that the aircraft could not reach West Berlin.

11 October 1984
Aeroflot Flight 3352, a Tu-154B-1 (CCCP-85243), struck several maintenance vehicles while landing at Omsk Airport due to ATC errors and crashed, killing 174 of 179 on board and four more in the vehicles; ATC personnel subsequently received prison sentences of 12-15 years. The accident remains the second-deadliest in the Soviet Union with the deadliest being a Tu-154 crash that killed all 200 people on board. The crash of flight 3352 is the third-deadliest when counting Korean Air Lines Flight 007) and the deadliest on Russian soil.

23 December 1984
Aeroflot Flight 3519, a Tu-154B-2 (CCCP-85338), crashed at Krasnoyarsk Airport following double engine failure and in-flight fire, of the 111 on board, only a passenger survived.

10 July 1985
Aeroflot Flight 5143, a Tu-154B-2 (CCCP-85311), stalled and crashed near Uchkuduk due to crew fatigue and crew errors, killing all 200 on board. The accident remains the deadliest in Soviet history, the deadliest in Uzbekistan, and the deadliest involving the Tu-154.

21 May 1986
An Aeroflot Tu-154B-2 (CCCP-85327) suffered structural damage in a high-speed descent after the crew thought the aircraft was going to stall; the aircraft landed safely at Sheremetyevo Airport with no casualties, but the severe stresses (3.2g) placed on the airframe resulted in the aircraft being written-off. The pilots had forgotten to turn on the pitot heating system, causing incorrect airspeed readings.

18 January 1988
Aeroflot Flight 699, a Tu-154B-1 (CCCP-85254), broke in three after a hard landing at Krasnovodsk Airport due to pilot error, killing 11 of 143 on board.

8 March 1988
Aeroflot Flight 3739, a Tu-154B-2 (CCCP-85413), was hijacked by the Ovechkin family, a family of 11 who were attempting to flee the Soviet Union and demanded to be flown to London. The flight engineer persuaded the hijackers to allow a stop in Finland to refuel, but the pilot tricked the hijackers by landing at Veshchevo instead. Realizing they had been tricked, one of the hijackers killed a flight attendant, Tamara Zharkaya. After landing, the aircraft was stormed and another hijacker blew himself up, starting a small fire in the tail that was quickly put out. Four hijackers committed suicide and three passengers also died during the takeover. Two surviving hijackers were tried and received prison sentences.

11 July 1988
China Xinjiang Airlines Flight 9501, went astray due to malfunctioning navigation equipment and was forced to land in a deserted military airfield after running low on fuel. All 11 crew members and 162 passengers were unhurt. Through scrupulous preparation and maintenance work, the aircraft was successfully extricated and returned to service.

24 September 1988

1. An Aeroflot Tu-154B-2 (CCCP-85479) landed hard at Aleppo Airport following an unstable approach in light turbulence, overrunning the runway and collapsing the landing gear; all 168 on board survived, but the aircraft was written off. The center of gravity was outside limits and the aircraft was out of trim.
2. On the same day an Aeroflot Tu-154M (CCCP-85617) was written off following a hard landing at Norilsk Airport; the aircraft was transferred to Ulyanovsk HFS in 1989 for use as a ground instructional airframe.

13 January 1989
An Aeroflot Tu-154S (CCCP-85067) operating a cargo flight, overran the runway following a rejected takeoff at Roberts International Airport, near Monrovia, Liberia. There were no fatalities amongst the crew, but the aircraft was damaged and written off. The aircraft was overloaded, and the cargo had shifted, causing the center of gravity to move forward.

9 February 1989
A TAROM Tu-154B-2 (YR-TPJ) was simulating an engine failure during a training flight at Otopeni International Airport when it crashed on takeoff after the flaps were raised too soon, killing the five crew.

== 1990s ==
19 August 1990
Aeroflot Flight 4076 was hijacked by 15 prisoners, carrying 77 hostages. After returning to Neryungi, they release all woman, children, the bodyguards in exchange to two more prisoners and weapon. After six decided to leave, they were left with eleven prisoners, twenty-nine male passengers and the seven crew members. The plane got refueled at Krasnoyarsk and Tashkent - where two more crew members involved. The plane destination was Karachi, which they only got landed due to fuel starvation. The hostages were free and the hijackers were sent to prison. No one of the 92 on board were injured.
20 October 1990
An Aeroflot Tu-154B-1 (CCCP-85268) overran the runway on takeoff at Kutaisi Airport after failing to lift off due to overloading and a too far forward center of gravity; all 171 on board survived, but the aircraft was damaged beyond repair and written off.

17 November 1990
An Aeroflot Tu-154M (CCCP-85664) force-landed and broke apart near Velichovky following a fire in the cargo hold; all six crew survived.

23 May 1991
Aeroflot Flight 8556, a Tu-154B-1 (CCCP-85097), landed hard short of the runway at Pulkovo Airport in rain following excessive descent, killing 13 of 178 on board.

14 September 1991
Cubana Flight 464, a Tu-154B-2 (CU-T1227), overran the runway on landing at Mexico City International Airport after landing too late; all 112 on board survived, but the aircraft was heavily damaged and written off.

5 June 1992
Balkan Bulgarian Airlines Flight 7022, a Tu-154B (LZ-BTD), ran off the runway on landing at Varna Airport in bad weather after landing too late; all 130 on board survived, but the aircraft was written off. The aircraft was operating a charter flight from Stockholm to Varna.

7 June 1992
An Aeroflot Tu-154 was hijacked en route from Grozny to Moscow by a man armed with a hand grenade and demanded to be flown to Turkey. The aircraft continued to Moscow where the hijackers was shot and killed by Russian security. All 115 on board survived.

19 June 1992
Aeroflot Flight 5308, a Tu-154B-1 (CCCP-85234), made a refueling stop at Bratsk Airport but was grounded by maintenance issues after which everyone on board disembarked the aircraft. That night, another Aeroflot Tu-154B-1 (CCCP-85282) operating Flight 2889 also stopped at Bratsk to refuel. Ten passengers remained on board this Tu-154 with the pilot's permission while the remaining 120 left the aircraft and went to the terminal. Two tankers were connected by a hose and began refueling CCCP-85282, but in the process the hose disconnected from the receiver of the main tanker. Fuel poured out onto the exhaust manifold of the engine operating the pump, starting a fire. The pumps could not be shut down and fuel continued to pour out. A few minutes later, CCCP-85282 caught fire, followed by CCCP-85234. The fire could not be extinguished and both aircraft burned out. The truck driver drove the burning tankers away from the scene, but he suffered severe burns and later died of his injuries. All on board CCCP-85282 escaped the fire and survived. The hose had disconnected due to errors made by the operator, who was drunk.

20 July 1992
A Tbilisi Aviation Enterprise Tu-154B (4L-85222) crashed shortly after takeoff from Novo Alexeyevka Airport due to overloading and a too far forward center of gravity, killing all 24 on board and four more on the ground.

1 August 1992
An Ariana Afghan Airlines Tu-154M (YA-TAP) was destroyed during a mortar attack while parked at Kabul Airport; no casualties. The aircraft had been parked for repairs following an incident on 29 May 1992 when it was struck by a rocket while on approach to Kabul.

23 August 1992
Aeroflot Flight 2267, a Tu-154M (CCCP-85670), struck an antenna while on approach to Kloten Airport while attempting a go-around, damaging the inner flaps on the right wing; despite the loss of flaps, the aircraft was able to land safely and was repaired and returned to service.

5 September 1992
An Air Ukraine Tu-154B-1 (CCCP-85269) performed an emergency landing at Borispol Airport after the left main landing gear failed to extend; there were no casualties, but the aircraft was damaged beyond repair and written off..

13 October 1992
An Aeroflot Tu-154B-2 (EW-85528) overran the runway on takeoff from Vladivostok Airport after failing to lift off due to overloading and a center of gravity that was too far forward; all 67 on board survived, but the aircraft was damaged beyond repair and written off.

5 December 1992
An Aeroflot Tu-154B (CCCP-85105) veered off the runway on landing at Yerevan Airport in poor visibility after the pilot mistook runway edge lights for centerline lights; all 154 on board survived, but the aircraft was written off.

9 January 1993
Indian Airlines Flight 840, a Tu-154B-2 (UK85533), struck some installations next to the runway while landing at Indira Gandhi International Airport, became airborne again, then touched down next to the runway, breaking off the tail and right wing and rolling upside down. All 165 on board survived. The aircraft and crew were leased from Uzbekistan Airways due to a pilot strike at Indian Airlines.

8 February 1993
Iran Air Tours Flight 962, a Tu-154M (EP-ITD), collided in mid-air with an IRIAF Sukhoi Su-24 near Tehran due to ATC errors and pilot error of the Su-24, killing all 133 on board both aircraft.

14 August 1993
Aeroflot Flight 2422, a Tu-154, was hijacked by a lone male passenger; as the aircraft neared Moscow, the hijacker threatened to blow up the aircraft and demanded to be flown to Sweden. The pilot continued to Moscow where the hijacker was arrested and apologized to his fellow passengers; no bomb was found.

22-23 September 1993
1993 Sukhumi airliner attacks: On 22 September, an Orbi Georgian Airways Tu-154B (4L-85163) was shot down while on approach to Babusheri Airport and crashed on the runway, killing 108 of 132 on board; this accident remains the deadliest in Georgia. On 23 September, an Orbi Tu-154B-2 (4L-85359) was written off after it was struck by mortar or artillery fire.

30 September 1993
A Sichuan Airlines Tu-154M (possibly B-2822) was hijacked by a Chinese taxi driver who demanded to be flown to Taiwan. The hijacker was armed with a knife and claimed he had enough explosives to blow up the aircraft. The aircraft landed at Taipei where the hijacker surrendered without incident; the supposed explosives were nothing more than sand and dark vegetable ink.

25 December 1993
A Vnukovo Airlines Tu-154B-2 (RA-85296) suffered a nosegear collapse while landing at Grozny Airport in poor weather; all 172 on board survived, but the aircraft was written off. The aircraft was leased from Aeroflot.

29 December 1993
An OmskAvia Tu-154B-2 (RA-85358) suffered right main landing gear collapse while landing at Omsk Airport, damaging the right wing and landing gear fairing; all 164 on board survived and the aircraft was repaired and returned to service. While lowering the landing gear, the right main landing gear failed to extend.

3 January 1994
Baikal Airlines Flight 130, a Tu-154M (RA-85656), crashed near Mamony due to an in-flight fire caused by an uncontained engine failure, killing all 124 on board; one person on the ground also died when the aircraft hit a dairy farm. The starter for the number two engine was stuck and later exploded, sending shrapnel into the engine and compartment area which severed fuel and hydraulic lines, starting a fire; control was lost due to a loss of hydraulic pressure and the aircraft crashed.

6 June 1994
China Northwest Airlines Flight 2303, a Tu-154M (B-2610), broke up in mid-air and crashed shortly after takeoff from Xi'an Xianyang International Airport due to a maintenance error, killing all 160 on board in China's deadliest air disaster. The autopilot controls had been connected backwards: the yaw-channel was connected to the bank control and the bank-channel to the yaw control.

21 January 1995
A Kazakhstan Airlines Tu-154B-2 (UN-85455) overran the runway at Karachi International Airport after failing to lift off due to overloading; all 117 on board survived, but the aircraft was written off.

7 December 1995
Khabarovsk United Air Group Flight 3949, a Tu-154B (RA-85164), struck Mount Bo-Jaus (32 mi west of Khabarovsk) due to loss of control after fuel was selected from the left tanks to counter a left wing-low attitude, killing all 98 on board; wreckage was found on 18 December.

26 March 1996
An Iran Air Tours Tu-154M (EP-ITS) suffered nosegear collapse while landing at Mashhad Airport after running off the runway and striking the edge of a road; all 178 on board survived and the aircraft was repaired and returned to service.

28 May 1996
A Varna International Airlines Tu-154M (LZ-MIR) struck a light pole with the right wing while taxiing at Leipzig Airport after landing; all 13 on board survived and the aircraft was repaired and returned to service.

29 August 1996
Vnukovo Airlines Flight 2801, a Tu-154M (RA-85621), struck Operafjellet mountain on approach to Svalbard Airport on Spitsbergen, due to pilot errors and lack of situational awareness, killing all 141 on board in Norway's deadliest air disaster. The aircraft was operating a charter flight for Arktikugol.

3 September 1996
Hemus Air Flight 7081, Tupolev Tu-154, the incident occurred on-route from Beirut International Airport in Lebanon to Varna Airport in Bulgaria. The hijacker, falsely claimed he had explosives on board. The aircraft landed at Varna at 15:15 UTC+2, where the hijacker exchanged the 149 other passengers for fuel. The aircraft continued to Norway with eight crew members and landed at Oslo Airport, Gardermoen at 20:04 UTC+1. He demanded asylum in Norway and quickly surrendered. No-one was injured in the incident.

13 September 1997
1997 Namibia mid-air collision of German Air Force Tu-154M Open_Skies 11+02, callsign "GAF074", collided with USAF Lockheed C-141B Starlifter 65-9405, callsign "REACH 4201", over the Atlantic Ocean off Namibia due to pilot and ATC errors, killing all 33 on board of both airplanes, neither fitted with TCAS. The Tu-154 and its crew, both taken over from former East German Air Force, had been flying too low.

15 December 1997
Tajikistan Airlines Flight 3183, a Tu-154B-1 (EY-85281), crashed in the desert 8 mi east of Sharjah after the aircraft descended too low due to pilot error and crew fatigue; of the 86 on board, only the flight navigator survived.

29 August 1998
Cubana de Aviación Flight 389, a Tu-154M (CU-T1264); on takeoff from Old Mariscal Sucre International Airport, Quito, Ecuador, after failing to lift off, the aircraft overran the runway and crashed into a soccer field, killing 70 of 91 on board, plus another 10 people on the ground. The crew had forgotten to select the switches for the hydraulic valves of the control system.

24 February 1999
China Southwest Airlines Flight 4509, a Tu-154M (B-2622), broke-up in mid-air and crashed near Wenzhou Yongqiang Airport while on approach, killing all 61 on board and injuring several on the ground. Incorrect locknuts had been installed in the elevator control system and these fell off during the flight, causing a loss of pitch control. This crash and the crash of China Northwest Flight 2303 in 1994 led China to retire the Tu-154; all Chinese Tu-154s were retired on 30 October 2002.

== 2000s ==
4 July 2000
Malév Flight 262, a Tu-154B-2 (HA-LCR), landed wheels-up at Thessaloniki due to pilot error and skidded down the runway; the aircraft was able to take off and land normally after a go-around; all 76 on board survived. The aircraft was written off due to the damage sustained in the incident and was donated to the airport's fire department for use in training fire crews until it was scrapped by the end of 2018.

15 March 2001
Vnukovo Airlines Flight 2806, a Tu-154M (RA-85619), was hijacked by three Chechens and flown to Medina, Saudi Arabia. On 16 March negotiators were able to secure the release of 47 hostages, mainly women and children and a stewardess who had been stabbed during the initial moments of the hijacking (she later died). Later that day the aircraft was stormed after the hijackers threatened to blow it up, and they demanded it be refueled for a possible flight to Afghanistan. After this event the aircraft was returned to service, and was later named Yulia Fomina after the stewardess killed during the attack.

4 July 2001
Vladivostok Air Flight 352, a Tu-154M (RA-85845), stalled and crashed near Burdakovka while on approach to Irkutsk due to pilot error, killing all 145 on board.

4 October 2001
Siberia Airlines Flight 1812, a Tu-154M (RA-85693), was accidentally shot down by an errant Ukrainian S-200 surface-to-air missile and crashed in the Black Sea 115 mi off Sochi, killing all 78 on board.

12 February 2002
Iran Air Tours Flight 956, a Tu-154M (EP-MBS), struck Mount Sefid Kuh while on approach to Khorramabad after the crew deviated to the left of the runway, killing all 119 on board.

20 February 2002
A Kish Air Tu-154M (EP-LBX) landed hard at Mashhad International Airport, suffering severe damage. The aircraft was flown to Vnukovo Airport for repairs, but the nose gear collapsed while under tow; it was written off and used for parts.

1 July 2002
Bashkirian Airlines Flight 2937, a Tu-154M (RA-85816), collided in mid-air with DHL Flight 611, a Boeing 757 (A9C-DHL) over Überlingen, Germany due to communication errors between ATC and TCAS, killing all 71 on board both aircraft.

24 August 2004
Siberia Airlines Flight 1047, a Tu-154B-2 (RA-85556), exploded in mid-air and crashed near Gluboki after a suicide bomber blew it up, killing all 46 on board.

15 August 2006
An Air Koryo Tu-154B-2 (possibly P-561) left the runway after landing at Sunan Airport and reportedly struck radar equipment, suffering minor damage; no casualties.

22 August 2006
Pulkovo Aviation Enterprise Flight 612, a Tu-154M (RA-85185), stalled and crashed near Sukha Balka, Donetsk Oblast while attempting to fly over a storm front, killing all 170 on board; until 2014, this crash was the deadliest in Ukraine.

1 September 2006
Iran Air Tours Flight 945, a Tu-154M (EP-MCF), swerved off the runway while landing at Mashhad International Airport, possibly due to a blown nosegear tire, killing 28 of 148 on board.

30 June 2008
Aeroflot Flight 846, a Tu-154M (RA-85667), suffered an uncontained failure in engine number one during takeoff from Pulkovo Airport and the pilot aborted the takeoff. The aircraft was parked at the airport and was scrapped in August 2009.

15 July 2009
Caspian Airlines Flight 7908, a Tu-154M (EP-CPG), lost control and crashed near Qazvin following a fire caused by an uncontained failure of engine number one, killing all 168 on board.

== 2010s ==
24 January 2010
Taban Air Flight 6437, a Tu-154M (RA-85787) leased from Kolavia, veered off the runway on landing at Mashhad International Airport after suffering a tailstrike; all 170 on board survived. The aircraft suffered considerable damage before catching fire, and was written off.

10 April 2010
Polish Air Force Tu-154M 101, callsign "Polish Airforce 101" and operating as Flight 101, crashed on approach to Smolensk North Airport in thick fog, killing all 96 on board, including Polish President Lech Kaczyński, his wife, and other high-ranking governmental officials.

7 September 2010
Alrosa Flight 514, a Tu-154M (RA-85684), overran the runway during an emergency landing at Izhma Airport following total electrical failure; all 81 on board survived. The aircraft was repaired on site and flown out in March 2011 and returned to service, flying until 2018 and is now in an aviation museum in Novosibirsk.

4 December 2010
Dagestan Airlines Flight 372, a Tu-154M (RA-85744), skidded off the runway at Domodedovo Airport during an emergency landing following double engine failure and broke in three, killing two of 170 on board; the flight engineer accidentally shut off a fuel pump while transferring fuel, causing fuel starvation and resultant engine failure. Following this crash and the crash of a Polish Air Force Tu-154 in 2010, the Russian Federal Bureau of Aviation recommended that all remaining Tu-154Ms be withdrawn from service.

1 January 2011
Kolavia Flight 348, a Tu-154B-2 (RA-85588), erupted in flames while taxiing at Surgut International Airport for takeoff, killing three of 124 on board; the fire was caused by an arc in a generator panel.

29 April 2011
Russian Air Force Tu-154B-2 RA-85563 overran the runway at Chkalovsky Airport following control failure; despite the runway excursion, the aircraft appeared to have suffered no damage.

25 December 2016
Russian Air Force Tu-154B-2 RA-85572, operating for the Russian Defense Ministry, crashed in the Black Sea off Sochi, killing all 92 on board, including 64 members of the Alexandrov Ensemble, an official army choir of the Russian Armed Forces. The pilot had probably become disorientated during climb out, leading to a loss of control. Following the crash, all Tu-154s in Russia were grounded.
