= Aeroflot Flight 213 =

Aviation accident in the Soviet Union

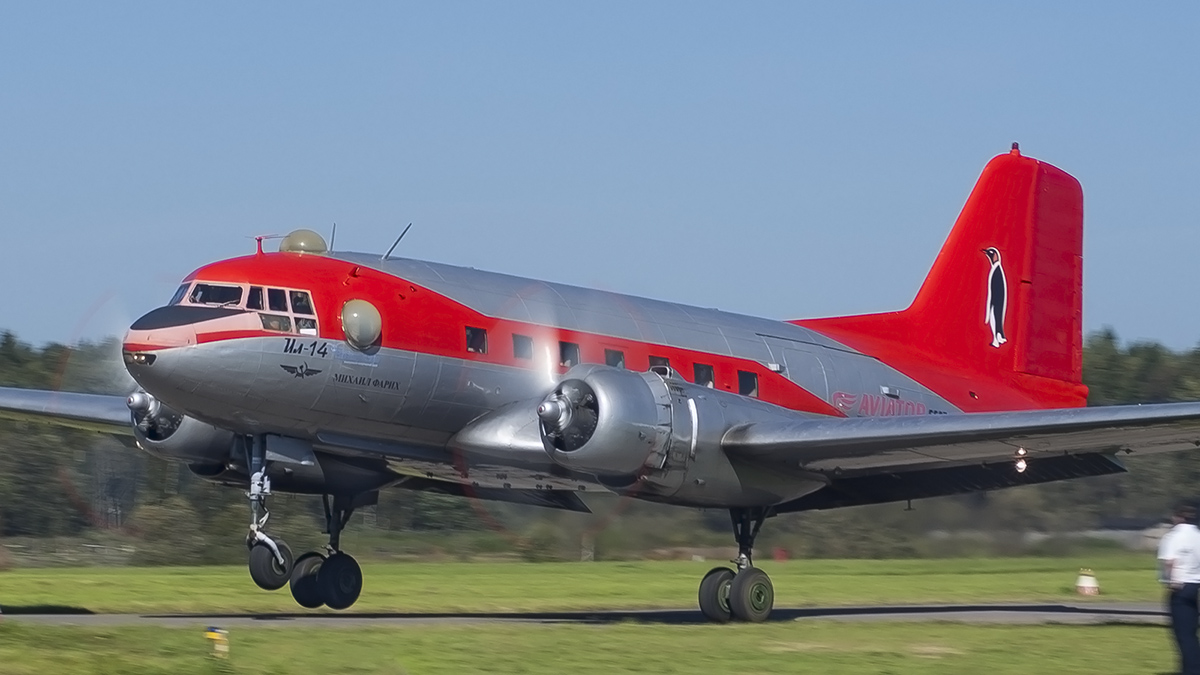
- An Ilyushin Il-14 similar to the accident aircraft

Accident
- Date: 18 September 1962
- Summary: Pilot error, weather, CFIT
- Site: Belaya Strelka (46 km SSE of Nizhne Kresty)

Aircraft
- Aircraft type: Ilyushin Il-14M
- Operator: Aeroflot
- Registration: CCCP-61628
- Flight origin: Magadan Airport, Magadan
- 1st stopover: Berelakh
- 2nd stopover: Zyryanka
- Last stopover: Chersky Airport
- Destination: Keperveyem Airport
- Occupants: 32
- Passengers: 27
- Crew: 5
- Fatalities: 32
- Survivors: 0

Aeroflot Flight 213 was a regularly scheduled passenger flight operated by Aeroflot from Chersky Airport to Keperveyem Airport. On 18 September 1962, the Ilyushin Il-14 operating this flight crashed shortly after takeoff. All 27 passengers and five crew members were killed.

The Air Accident Investigation Commission determined that pilot error was the main cause of the accident.

== Aircraft ==
Construction of the Il-14M involved, construction number 146000929 and serial number 09-29, was completed at the Moscow Banner of Labor production factory in 1956 and it was transferred to the civil air fleet. Registered CCCP-Л1628, the aircraft was initially sold to the Vnukovo detachment of the Moscow Territorial Aviation Directorate (MUTA). On 31 October 1958, the aircraft was re-registered to CCCP-61628 and transferred to the 185th (Magadan) air detachment of the Magadan separate air group of Aeroflot. At the time of the accident, the aircraft had sustained a total of 9,858 flight hours.

== Accident ==
Weather conditions at the time of the flight were poor. Visibility was 4–10 km in light snow with a cloud base of 600–700 meters. Flight 213 departed Chersky Airport at 06:20. The normal procedure involved circling above the valley while climbing to an altitude above surrounding terrain. This procedure was not followed and the crew flew on a heading directly to Keperveyem Airport. At an altitude of 800 meters and climbing, flying in clouds the aircraft impacted a 975-meter-tall (3,199 ft) mountain. The Ilyushin was destroyed and there was a postcollision fire. There were no survivors.

== Investigation ==
The investigating committee discovered the primary cause of the accident was the pilots decision to deviate from approved procedures. Contributing factors were a lack of appropriate air traffic control and the weather.

== See also ==
- Aeroflot accidents and incidents
- Aeroflot accidents and incidents in the 1960s
