= Flight 213 =

Flight 213 may refer to:

- Aeroflot Flight 213 crashed on 18 September 1962
- Bhoja Air Flight 213, crashed on 20 April 2012
