= 1990 Dubenec Tupolev Tu-154 crash =

1990 aviation accident in Czechoslovakia

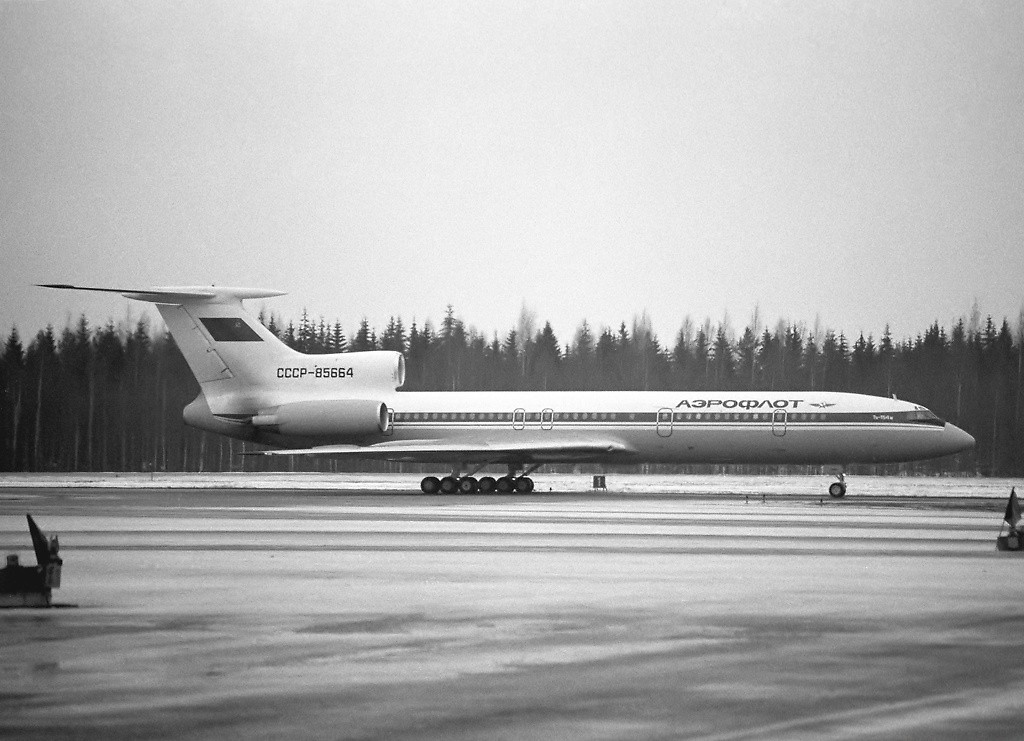
- CCCP-85664, the aircraft involved in the incident, photographed in 1989

Accident
- Date: 17 November 1990
- Summary: Forced landing due to in-flight fire
- Site: near Dubenec, Trutnov District, Hradec Králové Region, Czechoslovakia

Aircraft
- Aircraft type: Tupolev Tu-154M
- Operator: Aeroflot
- Registration: CCCP-85664
- Flight origin: EuroAirport Basel Mulhouse Freiburg, Basel, Switzerland
- Destination: Sheremetyevo International Airport, Khimki, Moscow Oblast, Soviet Union
- Occupants: 6
- Passengers: 0
- Crew: 6
- Fatalities: 0
- Injuries: 6
- Survivors: 6

On 17 November 1990, a Tupolev Tu-154M operated by Aeroflot suffered in-flight fire during a cargo flight from Basel, Switzerland to Moscow, USSR. The aircraft performed an emergency landing in a field near the village of Dubenec; the incident was known as the "Cigarette Flight". All 6 crew members on board survived albeit with injuries sustained in the fire such as smoke inhalation. All six made a full recovery.

== Background ==
The aircraft involved was a Tupolev Tu-154M, registration CCCP-85664, manufactured in 1989. On October 11, 1990, it was handed to the Ministry of Civil Aviation and transferred to Aeroflot.

The flight crew consisted of:

- Captain - Viktor Vasilyevich Stolyarov
- First Officer - Sergey Osipov
- Navigator - Rashid Almeshev
- Flight engineer - Vladimir Andreevich Ilyin
- Flight operator - Sergey Ilyashenko
- Inspector - Leonid Dmitrievich Khaiko

== Accident ==
=== Precedure ===
The aircraft was loaded with 1,217 boxes of Winston cigarettes, all of which were placed between the seats, in the aisles, and even in the galley located in the central section. Because of this arrangement of the cargo, the crew could not access the rear section of the fuselage if necessary. Around 14:00, the flight took off from Basel and after gaining altitude, reached FL330 (10,050 meters); 30 minutes after takeoff, the airliner entered Czechoslovak airspace.

=== Fire on board ===
At 15:08, while entering Polish airspace, the flight controller reported "smoke in the cabin"; however, the fire alarm did not sound. The captain, who was checking the cabin, confirmed the presence of smoke, with smoke coming from the ceiling lights and air vents. Suspecting an electrical fire, the crew turned off the ventilation system and de-pressurized the cabin. The pilots then contacted Prague Airport, approximately 100 kilometers (54 nautical miles) away, and requested an emergency landing. The controller instructed the crew to make a right turn towards runway 25.

The inspector ordered the pilots to initiate an emergency descent, while the flight operator attempted to extinguish the fire. However, due to stress, the pilots initiated a normal descent instead of an emergency descent, dropping at a rate of 10 m/s instead of 60–70 m/s. Meanwhile, the inspector and flight operator attempted to extinguish the fire by discharging fire extinguishers into the air vents, but this was ineffective, and the smoke continued to intensify. They eventually suspected that either engine No. 2 or the aft maintenance compartment was on fire. CCCP-85664 was at an altitude of 7,000 meters (23,000 feet) when the inspector returned to the cockpit and saw that the pilots were executing a normal descent, ordered them to initiate an emergency descent immediately.

Moments later, smoke began to enter the cockpit, disorienting the crew. They tried to ventilate the cockpit by opening the windows, since the aircraft had already been depressurized by the fire, but this only slightly improved visibility in the cockpit, allowing them to see at minimum the instrument panel. The crew donned oxygen masks, but in the stressful situation, they forgot to switch the microphones to the "Mask" position. As a result, the air traffic controller was now unable to hear reports from the aircraft, and the crew members themselves had difficulty communicating with each other; in addition, the navigator forgot to activate the distress signal.

=== Landing ===
At 15:21, 13 minutes and 20 seconds after the first report of the fire, the aircraft flew over the village of Litič, landing in a field between the villages of Dubenec and Nouzov in the Trutnov district. A witness near the village of Nouzov stated:

I was riding my bike to my village of Nouzov. I heard a hissing, whistling noise. There was no one around, just cars driving along the road. The noise grew louder from somewhere in the sky, and suddenly something fell out of the clouds, leaving fiery trails behind it. Probably a spacecraft, I thought. This incomprehensible something flew over the outer houses, gently approaching the ground, and crossed my path. From the nose and wings, I realized it was an airplane, its entire center ablaze, flames engulfing the engines, only the upper part of the tail visible. I dropped to the ground, expecting an explosion. A moment later, I heard a grinding sound with the cracking of tearing metal, and soon everything went quiet. Looking up, I saw a burning field, a burning tail on one side, and the cockpit of the plane on the other, from which people were climbing out. I ran toward them.

The aircraft hit a 1.5-metre-high embankment near an asphalt road narrowly missing a passing car. The aircraft then hit powerlines, tearing the flight control surfaces from both wings and causing the fuselage to split into three pieces. The aircraft came to rest approximately 500 meters from the village of Dubenec. The tail section landed 200 meters away from the main wreckage.

All six crew members managed to escape the burning aircraft albeit with injuries. They were transferred to a hospital in Jaroměř and were able to make a full recovery. The cargo onboard the aircraft was completely destroyed, with the parts that weren't badly damaged being stolen by local residents. The local newspaper Prace saluted the pilots for safely landing the aircraft, stating:

Hats off to the pilots – these are true professionals

— newspaper Práče

== Investigation ==
The flight recorders, nor did any of the sensors onboard the aircraft, did not detect any fire onboard, which could have explained why the fire warning bell in the cockpit did not go off. The only evidence that a fire was present on the aircraft were the soot-stained belongings of the crew members, as well as the erratic movements of the airliner during descent, typical of pilot disorientation. The maximum vertical speed was 20 m/s, meaning an emergency descent was not initiated.

The investigators were unable to determine the exact cause of the fire with the most likely source being an electric stove in the right galley of the aircraft. One of the boxes of cigarettes activated a switch on the electric stove due to vibrations generated by the aircraft which heated another box of cigarettes sitting on the stove, causing it to ignite.
