= Aeroflot Flight 8556 =

1991 aviation accident in the Soviet Union

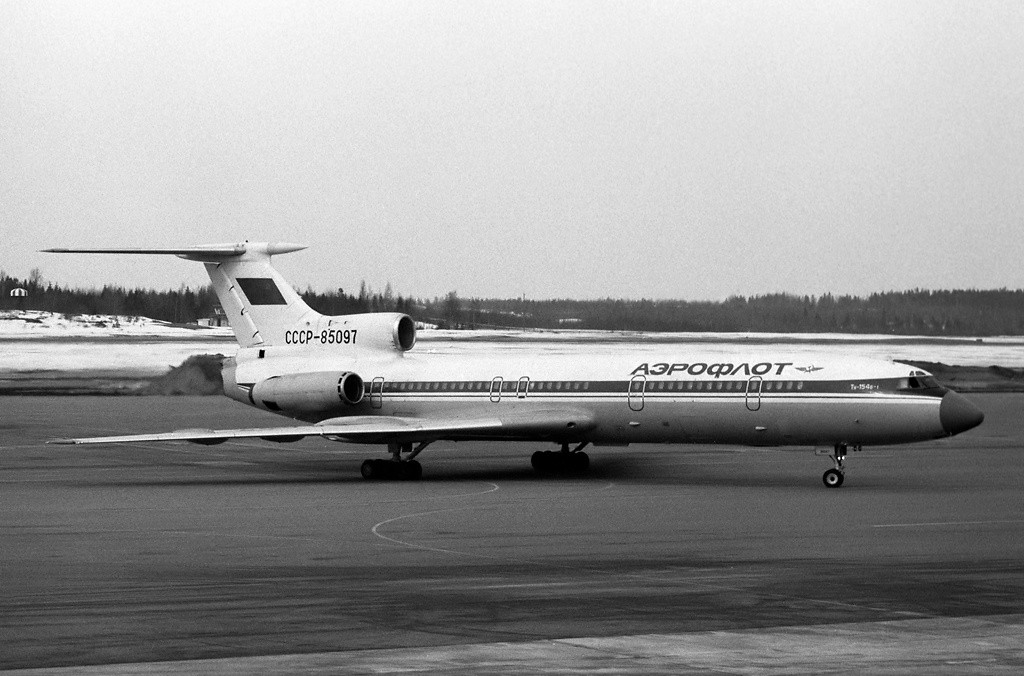
- CCCP-85097, The aircraft involved in the accident, seen in 1985

Accident
- Date: 23 May 1991
- Summary: Struck the ground short of the runway, pilot error
- Site: Leningrad-Pulkovo Airport, Leningrad, Russian SSR, Soviet Union

Aircraft
- Aircraft type: Tupolev Tu-154B-1
- Operator: Aeroflot
- Registration: CCCP-85097
- Flight origin: Sukhumi-Babusheri Airport, Georgian SSR
- Destination: Leningrad-Pulkovo Airport, Russian SSR
- Occupants: 181
- Passengers: 174
- Crew: 7
- Fatalities: 13
- Injuries: 37
- Survivors: 168

Aeroflot Flight 8556 was a scheduled domestic passenger flight from Sukhumi to Leningrad. It crashed 13 meters short of the runway on approach killing 13 passengers.

== Accident ==
At 12:45 Moscow time the aircraft began its descent from 10,100 metres (33,100 ft). During the descent the weather deteriorated and heavy rain and a cumulonimbus cloud were present, which was not transmitted to the crew. At 13:05 the plane was at around 200 metres (660 ft) when the descent rate was increased to 7.5 m/s and the aircraft slipped below the glideslope. At this time the controllers were replaced in a violation of procedure. The crew noticed they were below the glideslope so they increased engine-power and initiated a climb. The approach continued however and the rate of descent again reached 7 m/s. At an altitude of 20 metres (66 ft) the crew realized the danger and tried to stop the descent, but the aircraft struck the ground 13 meters short of the runway. The landing gear collapsed and the fuselage broke into three pieces.

== Causes ==
The approach was destabilized due to a number of factors. The actions of the crew were inconsistent and uncoordinated. There was no assistance from the approach controller in the final stages of the flight. The accident could have been avoided had the pilots initiated a go-around once they realized the approach was unstable.

== See also ==
- Aeroflot accidents and incidents in the 1990s
- List of accidents and incidents involving the Tupolev Tu-154
