= Krasnoborsk =

Krasnoborsk (Russian: Краснобо́рск) is the name of several rural localities in Russia:

- Krasnoborsk, Arkhangelsk Oblast, a selo in Krasnoborsky District of Arkhangelsk Oblast
- Krasnoborsk, Ulyanovsk Oblast, a selo in Krasnoborsky Rural Okrug of Terengulsky District of Ulyanovsk Oblast
