= Práče =

- Municipality
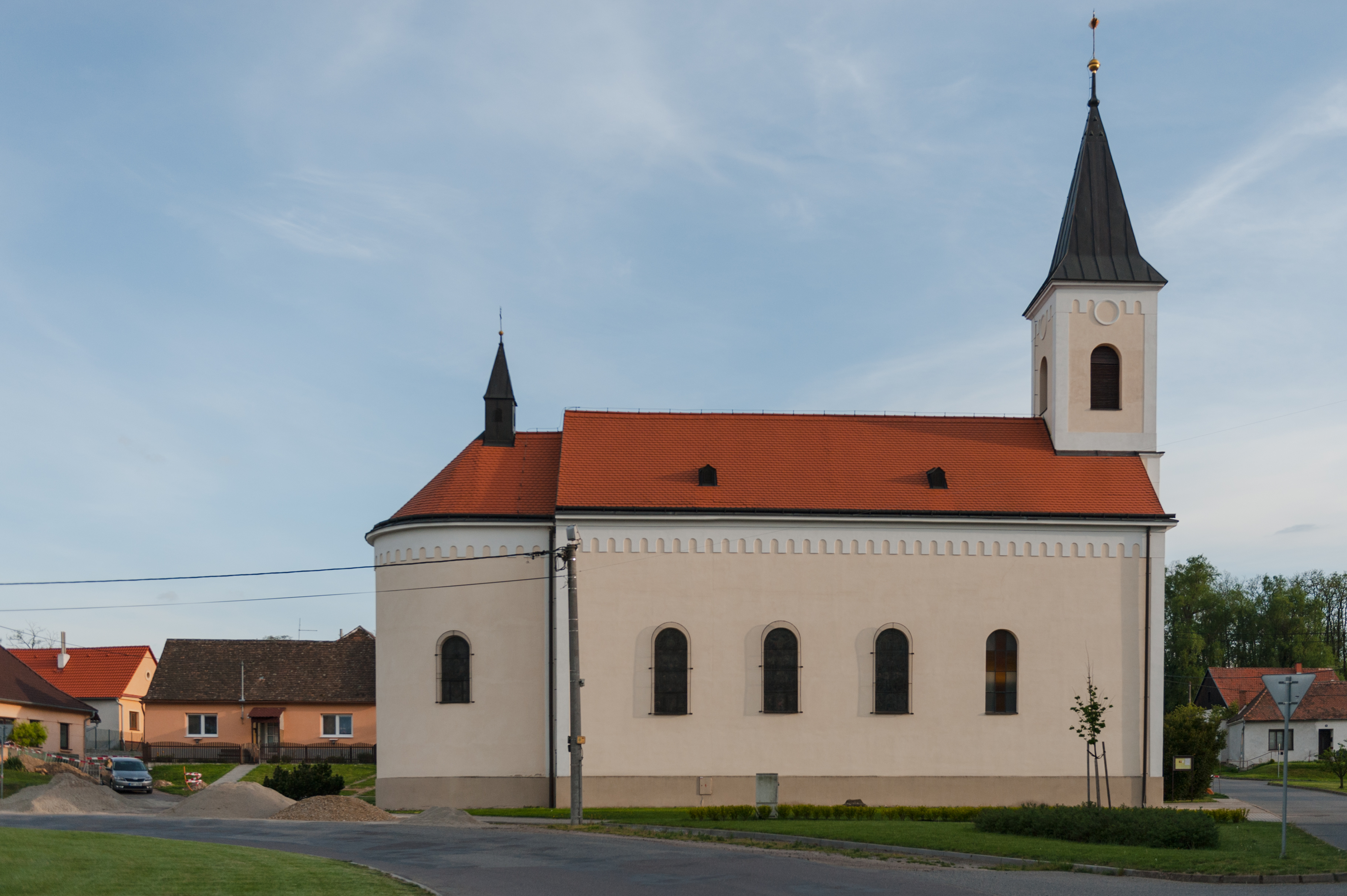
- Church of the Immaculate Conception of Mary

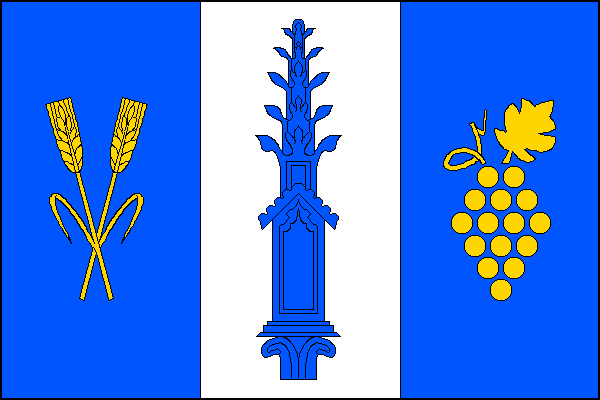
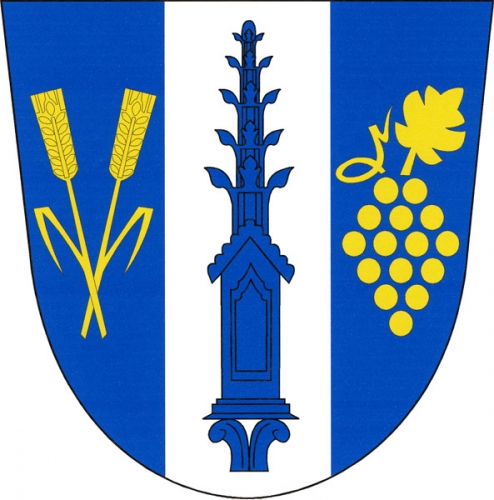
- Flag Coat of arms

- Location in the Czech Republic
- Coordinates: 48°52′37″N 16°12′4″E
- Country: Czech Republic
- Region: South Moravian
- District: Znojmo
- First mentioned: 1190

Area
  - Total: 7.41 km^{2} (2.86 sq mi)
- Elevation: 205 m (673 ft)

Population (2026-01-01)
  - Total: 807
  - Density: 109/km^{2} (282/sq mi)
- Time zone: UTC+1 (CET)
  - Summer (DST): UTC+2 (CEST)
- Postal code: 671 61
- Website: www.obec-prace.cz

Práče is a municipality and village in Znojmo District in the South Moravian Region of the Czech Republic. It has about 800 inhabitants.

Práče lies approximately 13 kilometres (8 mi) east of Znojmo, 47 km (29 mi) south-west of Brno, and 187 km (116 mi) south-east of Prague.

== Demographics ==
Historical population
Year	Pop.	±%
1869	379	—
1880	400	+5.5%
1890	432	+8.0%
1900	464	+7.4%
1910	445	−4.1%
1921	475	+6.7%
1930	527	+10.9%
1950	370	−29.8%
1961	389	+5.1%
1970	332	−14.7%
1980	401	+20.8%
1991	763	+90.3%
2001	803	+5.2%
2011	795	−1.0%
2021	771	−3.0%
Source: Censuses
