= Aeroflot Flight 6246 =

Aviation accident

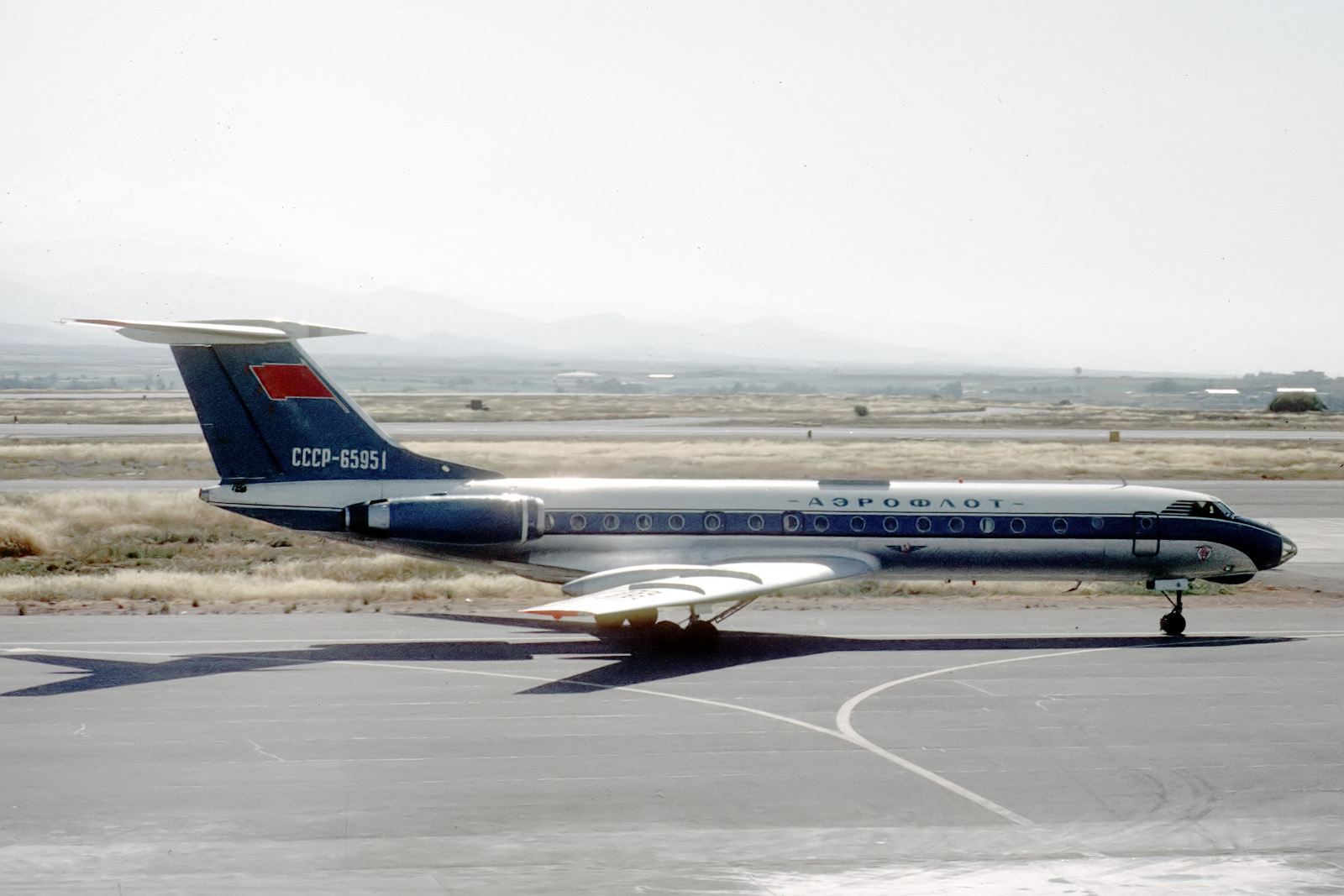
- CCCP-65951, the aircraft involved in this accident, pictured in 1974 with its previous livery

Accident
- Date: 13 January 1990
- Summary: Short circuit leading to in-flight fire
- Site: near Pervouralsk, Sverdlovsk Oblast, Soviet Union

Aircraft
- Aircraft type: Tupolev Tu-134A
- Operator: Volgograd OJSC on behalf of Aeroflot
- Registration: CCCP-65951
- Flight origin: Roshchino International Airport, Tyumen, Tyumen Oblast, Soviet Union
- Stopover: Ufa International Airport, Ufa, Bashkortostan, Soviet Union
- Destination: Volgograd International Airport, Volgograd, Volgograd Oblast, Soviet Union
- Occupants: 71
- Passengers: 65
- Crew: 6
- Fatalities: 27
- Survivors: 44

Aeroflot Flight 6246 was a scheduled domestic flight from Tyumen to Volgograd with a stop at Ufa. On 13 January 1990, just 22 minutes after takeoff, the Tupolev Tu-134A caught fire and force-landed into a glade near Pervouralsk. Of the 71 people on board, 27 died (23 passengers and 4 crew members).

== Aircraft ==
The plane involved was a Tupolev Tu-134A manufactured in 1972 and registered as CCCP-65951. At the time of the accident, the plane had accumulated 30,755 flying hours and 18,102 cycles.

== Crew ==
- Captain: Vladimir Dunayev
- Co-pilot: Alexander Sleptsov
- Navigator: Georgy Shilinkov
- Flight mechanic: Alexander Lukyanov
- Flight attendant: Natalya Bobrovskikh (Her daughter, Oksana Bobrovskikh, was also a flight attendant. She was involved in Volga-AviaExpress Flight 1303)
- Flight attendant: Lyubov Motyreva

== Accident ==
At 2:24 PM local time (12:24 Moscow time) the plane took off. At 2:45, the crew reported reaching 10,600 meters (34,800 ft).

At 2:48 PM, a fire alarm sounded in the auxiliary power unit (APU). The flight mechanic, armed with a smoke mask and a fire extinguisher, went to inspect the rear baggage compartment and confirmed the presence of a fire; however, he was unable to locate the source of the smoke or extinguish the fire. The RSBN range channel, the MS-61B voice recorder, MSRP-64 and KZ-63 parametric recorders turned off due to a power outage. The pilots contacted the air traffic controller, reported the fire on board, and requested an emergency descent and landing at Koltsovo Airport. Clearance was given to 4,800 meters (14,750 feet).

The controller gave the instruction to perform a left turn to the landing course. At 2:54 PM, the pilots contacted the air traffic controller and reported a fire in both engines. At the time, the aircraft was at an altitude of 1,800 meters (5,900 feet). The crew shut down the right engine. Eleven seconds later, due to equipment failure, the artificial horizons stopped working. Navigation instruments then began to fail.

Unfortunately, Sverdlovsk was shrouded in dense fog. Realizing they wouldn't make it to Koltsovo, the pilots decided to make an force-landing. At 2:56 PM, the Tu-134, with landing gear down and flaps retracted, landed in a snow-covered field 49 kilometers from the airport and 3 kilometers from Pervouralsk. All three landing gear legs sank into the snow and broke. After flying 148 meters, the aircraft lifted off, flew 104 meters, and crashed again. After racing through the snow for about 150 meters, the plane suddenly lifted off, as if propelled by an unknown force, and flew another 100 meters. Then, the remains of its landing gear and left wing touched the ground again, and after 50 meters, it rose again. After flying 150 meters, the plane struck the ground for the third time and crashed into a sprinkler hydrant. The mangled body crashed into a forest belt. The impact tore off the right wing, and the lift from the left wing flipped the aircraft over. It skidded on its back for several hundred meters before crashing into trees. The Tu-134 came to a stop 1,028 meters from where it first touched down.

The crash was so violent that doctor Viktor Shpakov admitted: "When we were driving to the crash site, to be honest, we didn't expect that any of the Tu-134 passengers would survive."

Twenty-two occupants died on scene. An additional two passengers and one crew member died, summing up to 27 fatalities.

All survivors were evacuated within an hour. Eleven ambulance crews arrived at the crash site.The victims were taken to hospitals in Sverdlovsk and Pervouralsk. Residents donated 200 liters of blood, medications were sent from across the region, and the Red Cross provided financial assistance. Some were discharged within a few days, while others faced lengthy treatment.

In response to the evacuation, passenger Artur Latypov said: "We saw smoke, it was getting hard to breathe, but there were no flames. There was no panic in the cabin. The crew and flight attendants behaved calmly, and their actions were clearly coordinated. I believe the captain made the right decision to land the plane; otherwise, we would all have suffocated. As it was, most of us were saved."

Witness V. Kolyasnikov stated "I was walking to work for my second shift when I suddenly heard a loud roar. I saw a plane flying very low, tilted oddly. I'd barely watched it go before I lost sight of it. Soon after, I saw a white column of air ahead and ran to call,"

== Investigation ==
During the accident investigation, the commission found no errors in the pilots' actions. Investigations determined that the fire was caused by a short circuit in electrical wiring caused by a breakdown in insulation. The fire was located in the area of frames 48-50 on the left side of the aircraft, in the rear baggage compartment. This was the only source of the fire, as both engines and the auxiliary power unit were operational and showed no signs of fire. When the aircraft completely lost power before the crash, the fire immediately ceased.

== Memorial ==
A memorial was held yearly by the residents of Pervouralsk to honored the memory of the victims. A prayer service was held at the crash site.
