= Dubenec (Trutnov District) =

- Municipality
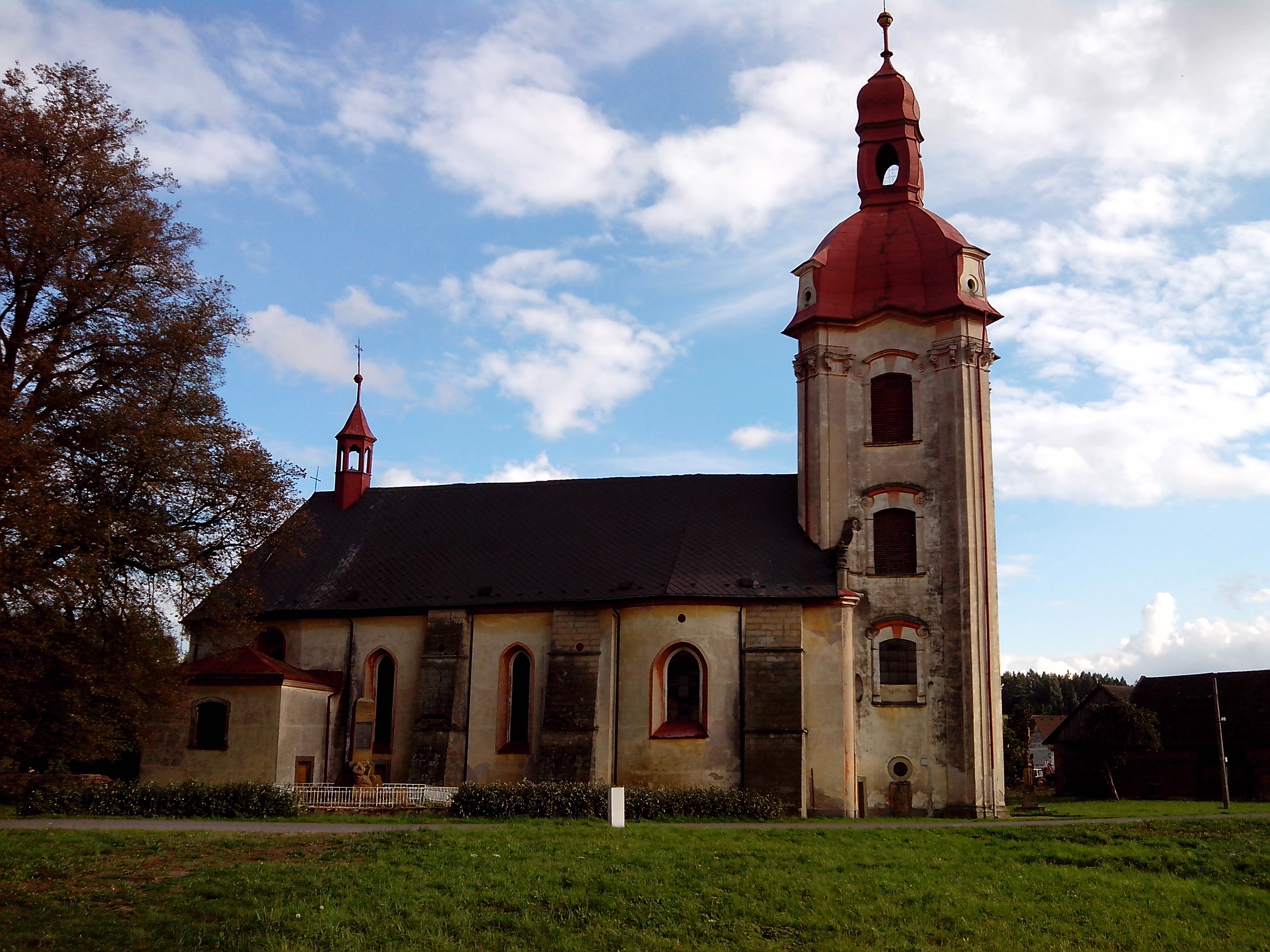
- Church of Saint Joseph

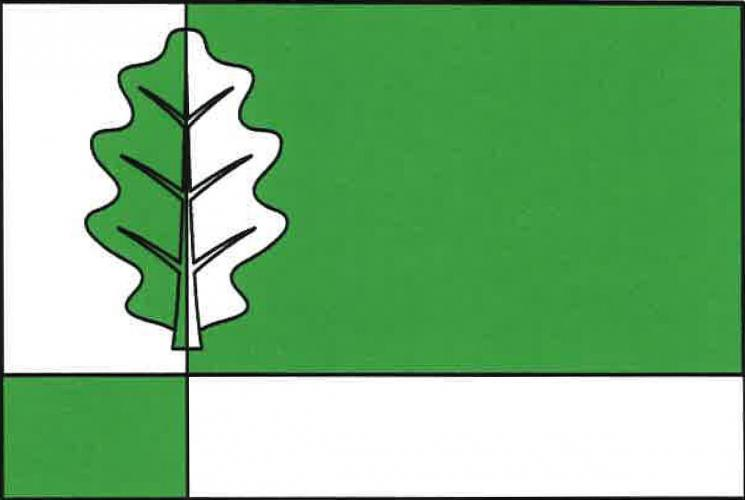
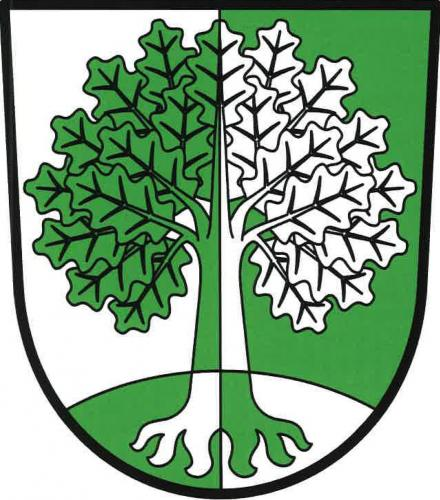
- Flag Coat of arms

- Location in the Czech Republic
- Coordinates: 50°22′40″N 15°47′43″E
- Country: Czech Republic
- Region: Hradec Králové
- District: Trutnov
- First mentioned: 1343

Area
  - Total: 12.14 km^{2} (4.69 sq mi)
- Elevation: 296 m (971 ft)

Population (2026-01-01)
  - Total: 682
  - Density: 56.2/km^{2} (146/sq mi)
- Time zone: UTC+1 (CET)
  - Summer (DST): UTC+2 (CEST)
- Postal code: 544 55
- Website: www.dubenec.cz

Dubenec is a municipality and village in Trutnov District in the Hradec Králové Region of the Czech Republic. It has about 700 inhabitants.

== Demographics ==
Historical population
Year	Pop.	±%
1869	1,439	—
1880	1,365	−5.1%
1890	1,319	−3.4%
1900	1,236	−6.3%
1910	1,177	−4.8%
1921	1,052	−10.6%
1930	981	−6.7%
1950	707	−27.9%
1961	735	+4.0%
1970	682	−7.2%
1980	627	−8.1%
1991	593	−5.4%
2001	659	+11.1%
2011	682	+3.5%
2021	648	−5.0%
Source: Censuses
