= Kiçik Dəhnə =

- Municipality
- Location within Azerbaijan Location within Shaki-Zagatala Economic Region
- Coordinates: 40°59′30″N 47°04′44″E
- Country: Azerbaijan
- Rayon: Shaki

Population
  - Total: 9,099
- Time zone: UTC+4 (AZT)
  - Summer (DST): UTC+5 (AZT)

Kiçik Dəhnə (also, Kichik-Dakhna and Kichik-Dekhna) is a village and the most populous municipality in the Shaki Rayon of Azerbaijan. It has a population of .
