= Rakovka =

Rakovka Раковка
- Settlement
- Location within Voronezh Oblast Location within Russia
- Coordinates: 50°21′N 39°16′E
- Country: Russia
- Region: Voronezh Oblast
- District: Olkhovatsky District
- Time zone: UTC+3:00

Rakovka (Russian: Раковка) is a rural locality (a settlement) in Novokharkovskoye Rural Settlement, Olkhovatsky District, Voronezh Oblast, Russia. The population was 79 as of 2010.

== Geography ==
Rakovka is located 17 km north of Olkhovatka (the district's administrative centre) by road. Novokulishovka is the nearest rural locality.

== 25 June 1991 Plane Crash ==
Rakovka was the place of the 25 June 1991 plane crash, where the control was lost and the aircraft crashed.
