= Aeroflot Flight 846 =

2008 Engine failure in Russia

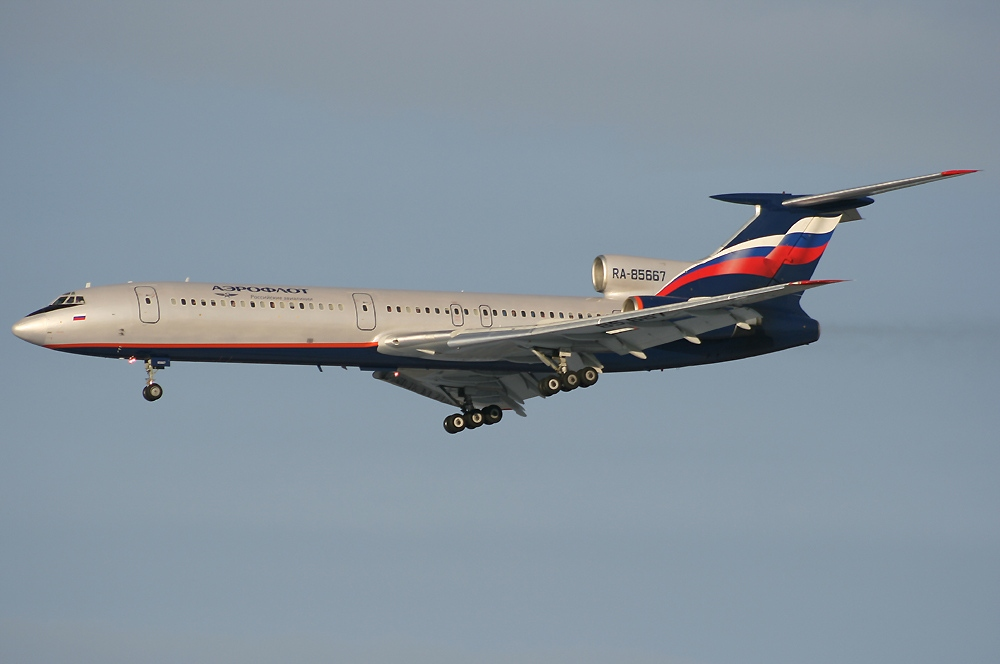
- RA-85567, the aircraft involved, photographed in 2007

Incident
- Date: 30 June 2008
- Summary: Uncontained engine failure leading to a rejected takeoff
- Site: Pulkovo Airport, Saint Petersburg, Russia

Aircraft
- Aircraft type: Tupolev Tu-154M
- Operator: Aeroflot
- IATA flight No.: SU846
- ICAO flight No.: AFL846
- Call sign: AEROFLOT 846
- Registration: RA-85567
- Flight origin: Pulkovo Airport, Saint Petersburg, Russia
- Destination: Sheremetyevo International Airport, Moscow, Russia
- Occupants: 112
- Passengers: 103
- Crew: 9
- Fatalities: 0
- Injuries: 0
- Survivors: 112

Aeroflot Flight 846 was a domestic passenger flight in Russia from St.Petersburg to Moscow. On 30 June 2008, the Tupolev Tu-154M suffered an uncontained engine failure and aborted the takeoff with everyone unhurt.

== Aircraft ==
The aircraft involved was a Tupolev Tu-154M manufactured in 1990. On 8 February 1990, it was delivered to Aeroflot's Magadan flight division with the registration number СССР-85667. After the collapse of the USSR, the aircraft was transferred to the newly-formed MAVIAL Magadan Airlines in 1994. In 2002 the aircraft was leased out to Kish Air (briefly re-registered as EP-LCD), then in 2004 returned to Russia and leased out to Vladivostok Air. The aircraft returned to MAVIAL Magadan Airlines in 2005 where it flew until 19 March 2007, when it was acquired by Aeroflot. At the time of the accident this Tupolev Tu-154M had accumulated 21690 hours and 8414 cycles.

== Accident ==
At 15:48 local time the aircraft began its takeoff roll, when at the speed of 60 km/h (37 mph) the crew felt a bang from the rear of the aircraft, after which the left engine flamed out. The crew aborted the takeoff when they realized that the left engine had failed. None of the 112 people on board were injured; the aircraft itself was parked at an alternate landing site at Pulkovo Airport.

== Insurance payment ==
RA-85667 was against damage for US$1.3 million , which at the exchange rate at that time was 42 million rubles. As for the restoration of the aircraft, according to an estimate made in September 2008, the restoration repairs would cost 43 million rubles, and after all calculations were completed, its total cost, including delivery from St. Petersburg to Samara, reached 69 million rubles. Thus, the cost of repairs significantly exceeded the insurance payments, and therefore the restoration of the aircraft was deemed economically infeasible.In August 2009, this Tu-154 was cut up for scrap metal.

== Investigation ==
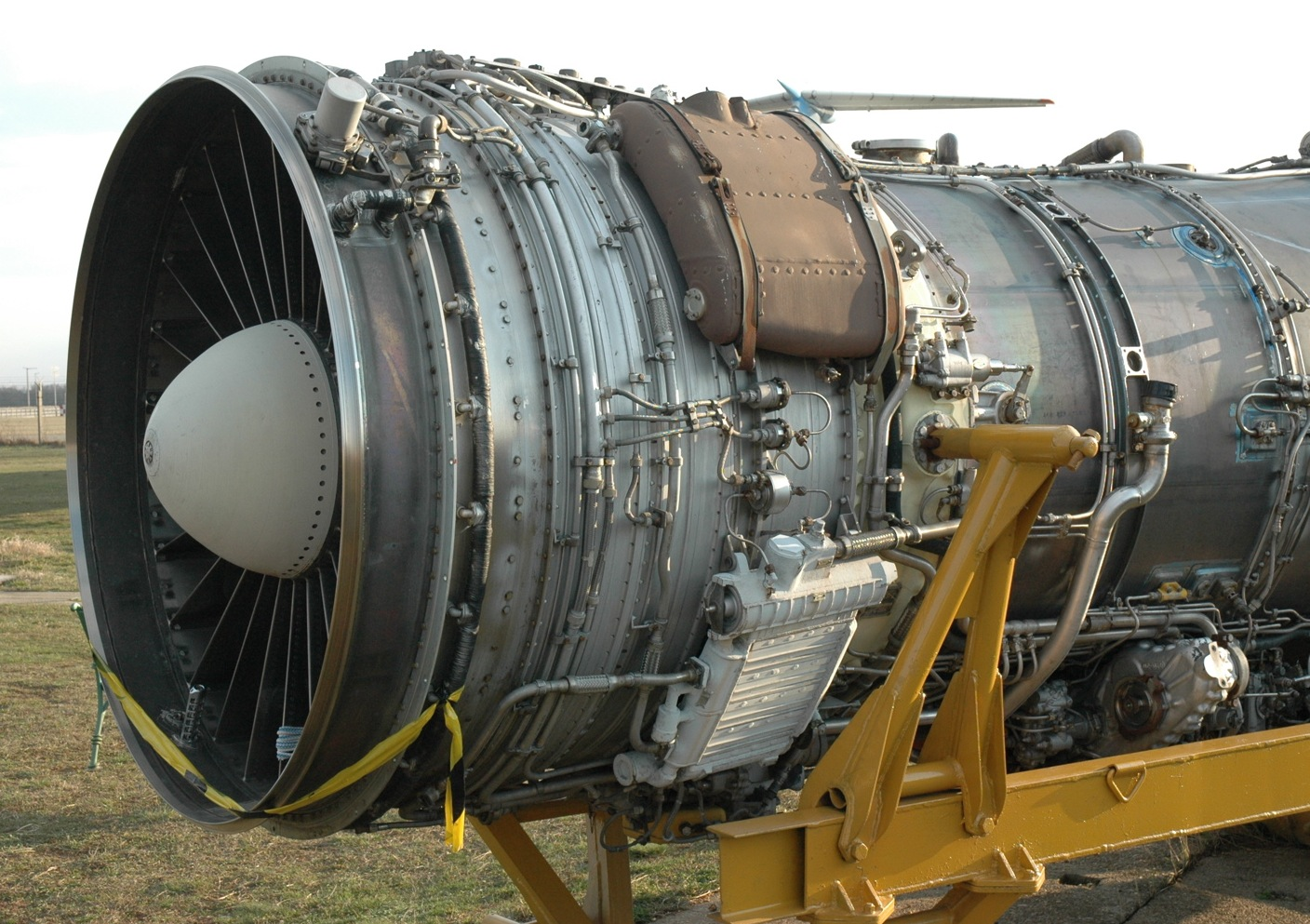
View of the low-pressure compressor of the D-30KU-154 engine

During an inspection of the left D-30KU-154 engine, it was discovered that disk 40-01-577 of the first stage of the low-pressure compressor had failed upon reaching nominal operating conditions. Due to the timely activation of the automatic fire extinguishing system, a fire did not occur when the engine failed.

The Federal State Institution, the State Center for Air Transport Flight Safety, conducted an investigation of the failed disk 40-01-577 and, on October 21, 2008, issued report No. 9297 I/103, concluding that the disk failure was due to high-cycle fatigue. Multiple near-surface fractures were discovered, located in the area of the angle formed by the blade groove and the trailing edge of the disk rim. High-frequency blade vibrations and low-frequency disk vibrations generated during engine operation generated natural disk vibrations, ultimately creating cyclic loading, which in turn led to the development of fatigue cracks. The investigation revealed that the failure zone contained high levels of residual stress due to the preserved fibrous structure, indicating that the disk material was excessively sensitive to loading conditions during operation, resulting in the formation of quasi-brittle fracture zones in the form of a faceted relief that extended considerably. That is, the disk material turned out to be too fragile.

On December 23, 2008, the final report was approved, according to which the destruction of the disk of the first stage of the low-pressure compressor, which led to a serious aviation incident, was not caused by operational irregularities, but by a design and manufacturing defect, that is, it occurred due to the fault of the engine manufacturer, the Saturn Scientific and Production Association.

== Aftermath ==
Following the incident in St. Petersburg, Aeroflot decided to begin decommissioning all remaining Tu-154 aircraft in its fleet in the last quarter of 2008, replacing them with Airbus A320 family aircraft, completing this transition by 2010.

In March 2011, following several more incidents and accidents involving Tu-154 aircraft (including Dagestan Airlines Flight 372 and Alrosa Flight 514), Rosaviatsia recommended that, from June 2011, the operation of Tu-154M aircraft be temporarily suspended until three major defects were addressed: the lack of a battery fault alarm, the lack of a fuel booster pump off alarm, and the occurrence of fatigue cracks in the first-stage low-pressure compressor disk on certain D-30KU-154 engines. While the first two modifications were deemed pointless by specialists, the third was considered very complex.
