= Birakan =

Human settlement in Obluchensky District, Jewish Autonomous Oblast, Russia

Coordinates: 49°00′03″N 131°43′12″E

Birakan is an urban locality (an urban-type settlement) in Obluchensky District of the Jewish Autonomous Oblast, Russia. Population: 2,151 (2010 census); 2,543 (2002 census); 3,089 (1989 Soviet census).
