= MAVIAL Magadan Airlines =

Mavial Magadan Airlines
| IATA | ICAO | Call sign |
|---|---|---|
| H5 | MVL | Mavial |
- Founded: 1993
- Ceased operations: 2006
- Fleet size: 7
- Destinations: 11
- Headquarters: Magadan, Russia

Mavial Magadan Airlines was an airline based at Magadan, Russia, operating Tupolev Tu-154 and Ilyushin aircraft. As of the summer of 2006, it was the only airline flying between the Russian Far East and the American state of Alaska.

The airline suspended commercial operations in July 2006 with debts of around $18 million. It has not declared bankruptcy.

== Destinations ==
As of the summer of 2006, Mavial Magadan Airlines operated to the following destinations:

- Russia
  - Irkutsk (Irkutsk Airport)
  - Khabarovsk (Khabarovsk Novy Airport)
  - Krasnodar (Krasnodar International Airport)
  - Magadan (Sokol Airport)
  - Moscow (Domodedovo International Airport)
  - Novosibirsk (Tolmachevo Airport)
  - Petropavlovsk (Petropavlovsk-Kamchatsky Airport)
  - Saint Petersburg (Pulkovo Airport)
  - Vladivostok (Vladivostok International Airport)
  - Yekaterinburg (Koltsovo Airport)
- United States
  - Anchorage (Ted Stevens Anchorage International Airport)

== Fleet ==
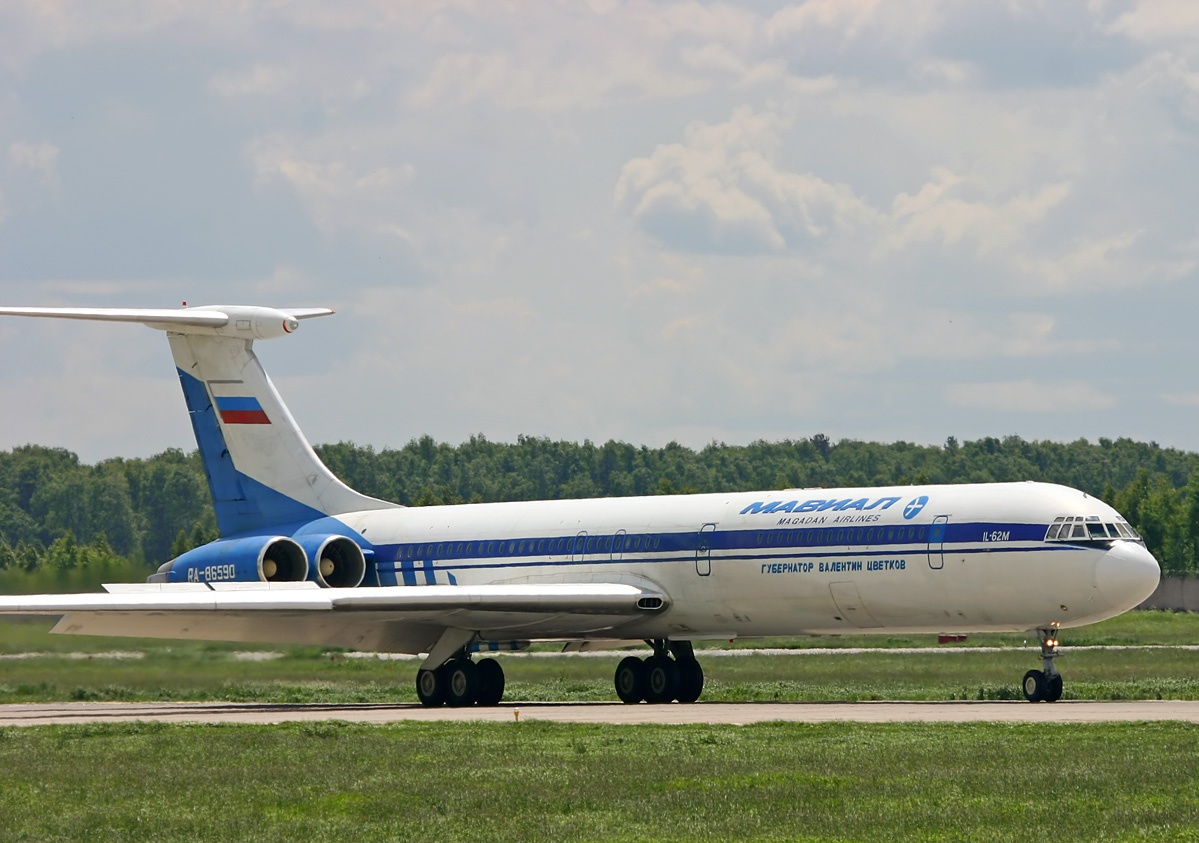
Mavial Ilyushin Il-62M

As of August 2006 the Mavial fleet included:

- 2 Ilyushin Il-62M
- 3 Tupolev Tu-154B
- 2 Tupolev Tu-154M
