= Aeroflot accidents and incidents in the 1970s =

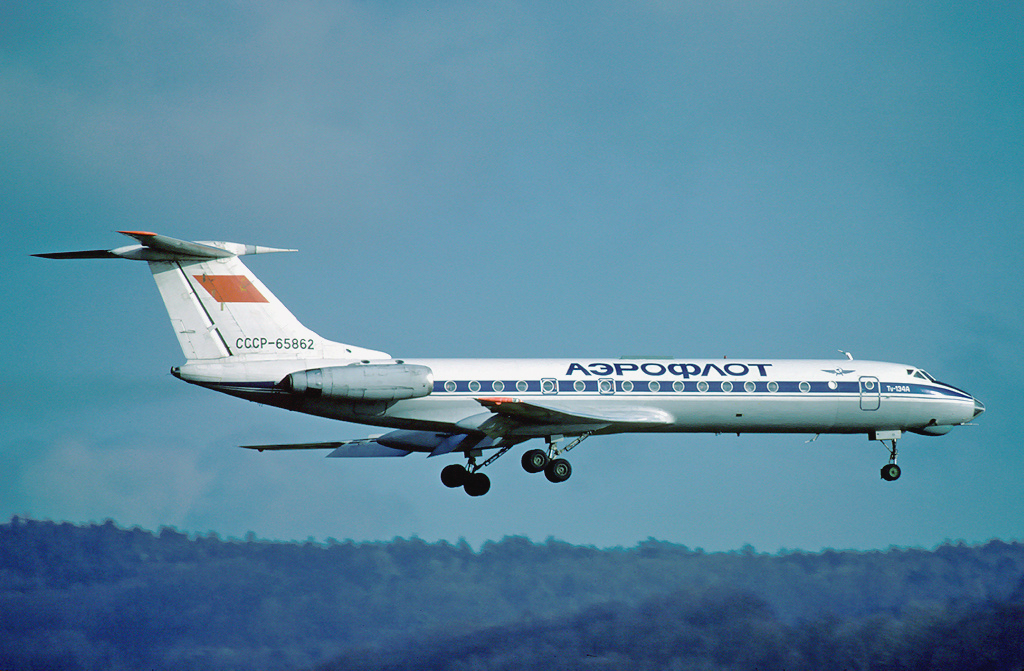
A Tupolev Tu-134, similar to both aircraft involved in the August 1979 mid-air collision

Aeroflot, the Soviet Union's national carrier, experienced a number of serious accidents and incidents during the 1970s. The airline's worst accident during the decade took place in August 1979, when two Tupolev Tu-134 aircraft were involved in a mid-air collision over the Ukrainian city then named Dniprodzerzhinsk, with the loss of 178 lives. Including this event, there were nine deadly incidents with more than 100 fatalities, while the total recorded number of casualties was 3,541 for the decade.

Almost all of the events shown below occurred within the Soviet Union. Certain Western media conjectured that the Soviet government was reluctant to publicly admit the occurrence of such events, which might render these figures higher, as fatal events would have only been admitted when there were foreigners aboard the crashed aircraft, the accident took place in a foreign country, or they reached the news for some reason. However, no significant amount of unreported serious accidents have emerged after the dissolution of the USSR, in any of its then-constituent republics.

The Antonov An-10, which entered the fleet in 1957, was withdrawn from service following an accident that occurred in May 1972 and killed all 122 people on board. In the decade, the company lost six aircraft of the type. Aeroflot also retired the Tu-124 (entered the fleet in 1962) following a 1979 accident that killed all 63 on board. The company lost seven aircraft of the type in the decade. Other types lost in accidents/incidents were 170 Antonov An-2s, 18 Antonov An-12s, two Antonov An-22s, 31 Antonov An-24s, three Antonov An-26s, three Avia 14s, one Beriev Be-30, 13 Ilyushin Il-14s, 19 Ilyushin Il-18s, two Ilyushin Il-62s, two Let L-410 Turbolets, six Lisunov Li-2s, 16 Tupolev Tu-104s, seven Tupolev Tu-134s, six Tupolev Tu-154s, and 27 Yakovlev Yak-40s. This totals to 339 aircraft lost in this decade.

== List ==
Date	Location	Aircraft	Tail number	Airline division	Aircraft damage	Fatalities	Description	Refs
1970	(Soviet Union) Saratov	An-24B	CCCP-46241	Privolzhsk	W/O	Unknown	Destroyed by fire while refuelling at Saratov Airport.	
28 January 1970	(Soviet Union) Off Batagay	An-24B	CCCP-47701	Yakut	W/O	34/34	Crashed 40 kilometres (25 mi) away from Batagay on a premature descent to the city airport, inbound from Deputatskiy Airport on a domestic scheduled passenger service.	
29 January 1970	(Soviet Union) Murmansk	Tu-124V	CCCP-45083	Northern	W/O	11/38	Crashed into a snow-covered hill, 29 kilometres (18 mi) away from Murmansk Airport, on approach, sliding down the snowy slope. Five occupants of the airplane perished immediately after impact; another six occupants died from hypothermia while awaiting for the rescue teams. The airplane was operating a domestic scheduled Leningrad–Murmansk passenger service as Flight 145.	
31 January 1970	(Soviet Union) Tokmass	An-2TP	CCCP-40573	Ural	W/O	2/2	The aircraft was being ferried from Chelyabinsk to Magnitogorsk when it stalled and crashed after the crew became disorientated in an area of heavy snow and poor visibility.	
6 February 1970	(Soviet Union) Samarkand	Il-18V	CCCP-75798	Uzbekistan	W/O	92/106	Crashed into a mountain amid a cloudy scenario, 32 kilometres (20 mi) northeast of Samarkand. The aircraft was operating a domestic scheduled Tashkent-Samarkand passenger service as Flight U-45.	
25 February 1970	(Soviet Union) Ust-Maya	Il-14M	CCCP-61637	Yakut	W/O	5/5	The aircraft was being ferried from Ust-Maya to Yakutsk when it crashed shortly after takeoff from Ust-Maya Airport following a malfunction on one of its engines during initial climbout.	
26 February 1970	(Soviet Union) Beryozovo	An-12TB	CCCP-12966	North Caucasus	W/O	0	Hard landing at Beryozovo Airport.	
5 March 1970	(Soviet Union) Ust-Kut	Li-2	CCCP-58340	Unknown	W/O	0/5	Stalled and crashed on takeoff from Ust-Kut Airport due to shifting cargo.	
19 March 1970	(Soviet Union) Nikolayevo-Kozlovski	An-2R	CCCP-25598	Uzbekistan	W/O	2/2	Controlled flight into terrain. The aircraft was performing an unauthorised crop spraying mission.	
1 April 1970	(Soviet Union) Toguchina	An-24B	CCCP-47751	West Siberia	W/O	45/45	The aircraft crashed 20 kilometres (12 mi) southeast of Toguchina, after it collided with a weather balloon while en route a domestic scheduled Novosibirsk–Krasnoyarsk passenger service as Flight 1661.	
4 April 1970	(Soviet Union) Zaporozhye	Avia 14M	CCCP-52002	Georgia	W/O	7/35	Crashed on approach to Zaporozhye Airport. The crew initiated the approach prematurely and did not monitor altitude. The pilots were late in configurating the plane for landing, and came in too low. A go-around was initiated at 40 metres (130 ft). While making a right-hand turn, the wing contacted the ground, causing the plane to crash 2,500 metres (8,200 ft) from the runway and 600 metres (2,000 ft) to the left of the runway centerline. The aircraft was operating a domestic scheduled Rostov-Zaporozhye service as Flight 2903.	
20 April 1970	(Soviet Union) Kuban	An-2R	CCCP-06333	North Caucasus	W/O	2/4	The aircraft was operating fertilizer application flights for the Kuban state farm. On the seventh flight, an aircraft technician and a farm employee were on board (the employee was also in the cockpit). The co-pilot took control of the aircraft while the pilot and employee went over some maps that were to be processed. Control was lost while in a low-altitude turn. The aircraft rolled 45° and crashed.	
24 April 1970	(Soviet Union) Rostov Region	An-2R	CCCP-41398	North Caucasus	W/O	0	Crashed on takeoff. The crew had not extended the flaps.	
28 April 1970	(Soviet Union) Ryazan region	An-2SKh	CCCP-15935	Uzbekistan	W/O	2/2	While crop-spraying for the "Nekrasovo" state farm, the aircraft went into a steep turn to avoid a power line. Altitude was lost and the aircraft crashed upside down.	
10 May 1970	(Soviet Union) Irkutsk region	An-2R	CCCP-32463	East Siberia	W/O	2/3	While crop-spraying for the "Zavyety Ilyicha" collective farm, the crew, who was drunk, performed a steep turn at very low altitude. The aircraft lost speed and altitude and crashed.	
15 May 1970	(Soviet Union) Kishinev	An-10	CCCP-11149	Ulyanovsk Flight School	W/O	11/11	On a training flight, lost control after a go-around at Kishinev Airport with two shut-down engines.	
5 June 1970	(Soviet Union) Samarkand	Il-18V	CCCP-75533	Uzbekistan	W/O	0	The locking of the rudder on take-off led to the crash of the aircraft at Samarkand Airport.	
25 July 1970	(Soviet Union) Ukhta	An-2TP	CCCP-41295	Komi	W/O	0	Crashed due to engine failure.	
26 July 1970	(Soviet Union) Aukštelkai	An-2R	CCCP-29387	Lithuania	W/O	3/3	After crop spraying at the "Gražionis" sovkhoz (state farm), the pilot, who was drunk, performed low-altitude stunts. Airspeed was lost and the aircraft crashed in the Možaicai forest and burned out.	
8 August 1970	(Soviet Union) Kishinev	An-10A	CCCP-11188	Ukraine	W/O	1/114	Force landed 38 kilometres (24 mi) from Kishinev. Twelve minutes into the flight, at 5,400 metres (17,700 ft), the crew detected smoke in the cockpit with a burning smell. An in-flight fire erupted after the number four engine suffered an uncontained failure, forcing the crew to carry out an emergency descent. The fire was extinguished, but hydraulic pressure was lost later. The pilot carried out a forced landing in a corn field. The terrain was uneven, and the fuselage collapsed. One passenger died. The aircraft was operating a domestic scheduled Vinnitsa-Simferopol service as Flight 888.	
9 August 1970	(Soviet Union) Kirovograd	An-2R	CCCP-45215	Ukraine	W/O	0	Crashed after striking a telephone line.	
20 August 1970	(Soviet Union) Namangan Region	An-2R	CCCP-15238	Uzbekistan	W/O	0	Crashed due to engine failure.	
23 August 1970	(Soviet Union) Yuzhno-Sakhalinsk Airport	Il-18V	CCCP-75823	Far East	W/O	0	While on final approach to Yuzhno-Sakhalinsk the aircraft came in too high and descended quickly. The aircraft landed first with the nosegear, collapsing it, after which the aircraft then slid off the runway, breaking off both wings. The aircraft was completing a domestic scheduled Moscow–Chelyabinsk–Krasnoyarsk–Chita–Yuzhno-Sakhalinsk passenger service as Flight 17.	
2 September 1970	(Soviet Union) Dnepropetrovsk	Tu-124	CCCP-45012	Lithuania	W/O	37/37	Crashed after control of the aircraft was lost en route a domestic scheduled Rostov-on-Don–Vilnius passenger service, operated as Flight 3630.	
3 September 1970	(Soviet Union) Leninabad	Yak-40	CCCP-87690	Tajikistan	W/O	21/21	Flew into the side of a mountain at 2,100 m (6,900 ft). The crew began descending over mountainous terrain in IMC conditions while they were not aware of the aircraft's exact position. The aircraft was operating a Frunze (now Bishkek)–Leninabad passenger service as Flight Sh-4.	
5 September 1970	(Soviet Union) Dzharkishlak	An-2R	CCCP-28952	West Siberia	W/O	2/2	During a crop-spraying flight for the "im. Kalinina" collective farm the aircraft struck a high-voltage power line while spraying a field which was not to be sprayed. The aircraft crashed in a cotton field.	
21 September 1970	(Soviet Union) Bulbukhta	An-2T	CCCP-02195	East Siberia	W/O	1/3	Struck a mountain at 1,400 m (4,593 ft) in poor visibility. The aircraft was operating a Perevoz-Bulbukhta cargo service with supplies for a mine.	
27 September 1970	(Soviet Union) Izhevsk	An-2T	CCCP-35417	Ural	W/O	0	Crashed after a loss of speed while on approach to an airfield near Izhevsk.	
1 October 1970	(Soviet Union) Kamenny Mys	An-12B	CCCP-11031	International	W/O	8/8	Crashed upon take-off following engine failures due to malfunctions in the fuel pump system.	
14 October 1970	(Soviet Union) Chernivtsi	An-2R	CCCP-02833	Ukraine	W/O	0	Crashed while attempting to land in poor weather.	
15 October 1970	(Turkey) Trabzon	An-24B	CCCP-46256	Georgia	Unknown	1/60	The aircraft was hijacked while en route from Batumi to Sukhumi by two hijackers, who demanded to be flown to Turkey.	
16 October 1970	(Soviet Union) Simferopol	Il-18V	CCCP-75578	Armenia	W/O	0	The crew diverted to Simferopol following an engine failure. The aircraft overran the runway after landing.	
16 October 1970	(Soviet Union) Leshukonskoye	Li-2	CCCP-84771	Northern	W/O	0	Crashed on takeoff from Leshukonskoye Airport. The aircraft was overloaded, having its center of gravity beyond the aft limit.	
29 November 1970	(Soviet Union) Tambov	An-2R	CCCP-25611	Moscow SPiMVL	W/O	0	Crashed while flying a low-altitude steep turn.	
31 December 1970	(Soviet Union) Leningrad	Il-18V	CCCP-75773	Armenia	W/O	6/86 (Note: There exists a discrepancy over the death toll, as it was also claimed it rose to 93.)	Crashed upon take-off from Pulkovo Airport when the crew forgot to select the flaps a priori. Due to operate a domestic scheduled Leningrad–Yerevan passenger service as Flight 3012.	
22 January 1971	(Soviet Union) Surgut	An-12B	CCCP-11000	Komi	W/O	13/13	The aircraft was operating a cargo service from Omsk to Surgut when it crashed 15 kilometres (9.3 mi) short of the runway due to icing conditions.	
31 January 1971	(Soviet Union) Surgut	An-12B	CCCP-12996	Tyumen	W/O	7/7	Icing conditions on the ailerons led the aircraft to undershoot the runway on landing at Surgut Airport and crash.	
7 February 1971	(Soviet Union) Kirovsk Airport	Il-14M	CCCP-91535	Arkhangelsk	W/O	0	Undershot the runway on landing.	
16 February 1971	(Soviet Union) Vorkuta	An-12TB	CCCP-11374	Komi	W/O	0/5	The aircraft was operating a Norilsk–Vorkuta flight. It was due to land at Vorkuta Airport, but diverted to an alternative airfield because of the weather. Overran the runway on landing, hit a snow mound, and broke up.	
31 March 1971	(Soviet Union) Voroshilovgrad	An-10	CCCP-11145	Privolzhsk	W/O	65/65	Crashed 13 kilometres (8.1 mi) away from Voroshilovgrad Airport on approach, due to structural failure of the starboard outer wing. The aircraft was operating a domestic scheduled Kuybyshev–Voroshilovgrad passenger service as Flight 1969.	
31 March 1971	(Soviet Union) Bykovo Airport	An-24	CCCP-46747	Central	W/O	0/5	While practicing approaches, the instructor-pilot thought the right engine was malfunctioning. The mechanic reduced power to the right engine while increasing power to the left engine. The mechanic then shut down the left engine by mistake and the right engine failed. The crew performed a wheels-up landing near the airport.	
11 April 1971	(Soviet Union) Tedzhen	An-2R	CCCP-25588	Turkmenistan	W/O	0	Lost airspeed and crashed on takeoff.	
29 April 1971	(Soviet Union) Chernivtsi	An-2R	CCCP-42696	Ukraine	W/O	0	Force-landed in a forest due to a loss of engine power.	
24 May 1971	(Soviet Union) Kirov	An-2T	CCCP-02171	Ural	W/O	0	Crashed. The aircraft was overloaded.	
25 May 1971	(Soviet Union) Batagay Airport	An-12B	CCCP-11024	Yakut	W/O	0/8	Hard landing.	
31 May 1971	(Soviet Union) Malakhovo	An-2R	CCCP-32076	Central	W/O	3/3	During a crop-spraying flight, the pilot, who was drunk, performed low-altitude stunts. Control was lost and the aircraft crashed in a forest and burned out.	
1 June 1971	(Soviet Union) Bogodorsk Island	An-24B	CCCP-47729	East Siberia	W/O	0	Crashed near Ulan-Ude while on a training flight. Part of the training was to fly the aircraft with one engine out. After the engine was shut down and its propeller feathered, the flight engineer shut down the remaining engine by mistake and a forced landing was carried out.	
15 July 1971	(Soviet Union) Pochop	An-2R	CCCP-06266	Central	W/O	2/2	During a crop-spraying flight, the crew, who was drunk, performed a low-altitude turn. The aircraft lost altitude and crashed in a field.	
16 July 1971	(Soviet Union) Kamennaya Sarma	An-2SKh	CCCP-43828	Privolzhsk	W/O	1/2	During a crop-spraying flight for the "Pobeda" collective farm the engine failed, probably due to a carburetor problem. Due to the terrain an immediate forced landing was not possible; instead the pilot performed a left turn but the aircraft lost altitude and crashed.	
25 July 1971 (Note: This event has also been reported to have taken place in August 1971; there is a discrepancy in the number of fatalities.)	(Soviet Union) Irkutsk Airport	Tu-104B	CCCP-42405	West Siberia	W/O	97/126	Landed hard and burst into flames at Irkutsk Airport, inbound from Novosibirsk. The aircraft was operating a domestic scheduled Novosibirsk–Irkutsk–Vladivostok passenger service as Flight 1912.	
28 July 1971	(Soviet Union) Lipetsk Airport	Yak-40	CCCP-87719	Central	W/O	0	Overran the runway on landing.	
29 July 1971	(India) Calcutta	An-12B	CCCP-12993	International	W/O	0/7	Overshot the runway on landing in heavy rain at Dum Dum Airport.	
16 September 1971	(Soviet Union) Bykovo Airport	Be-30	CCCP-62707	Central	W/O	0	Crashed during service trials, possibly due to a crew member shutting down an engine by mistake.	
22 September 1971	(Soviet Union) Polotsk	An-2	CCCP-96221	Yakut	W/O	14/14	Crashed out of control from 300 m (980 ft). The aircraft was flying 12 miners from Polotsk to Chelyabinsk, all of whom were drunk and not wearing seat belts. The passengers were probably moving around the cabin without crew permission, and this may have affected the center of gravity, causing the loss of control. The aircraft was operating a Polotsk-Chelyabinsk passenger service as Flight 697.	
25 September 1971	(Soviet Union) Tokko	An-2T	CCCP-98281	Yakut	W/O	0	Force-landed following engine failure.	
10 October 1971	(Soviet Union) Moscow	Tu-104B	CCCP-42490	Ukraine	W/O	25/25	While climbing through 1,200 m (3,937 ft) an explosive device detonated shortly after takeoff from Vnukovo Airport. The blast damaged the fuselage on the left side and destroyed flight controls. Control was lost and the aircraft rolled right, entered a descent and crashed. Due to operate a domestic scheduled Moscow–Simferopol passenger service as Flight 773.	
11 October 1971	(Soviet Union) Tyubelyaha	An-2T	CCCP-47678	Yakut	W/O	6/7	Crashed into a mountain in poor weather while en route a Moma Airport–Ust-Nera passenger service. The wreckage was found five days later.	
12 October 1971	(Soviet Union) Kishinev	An-10	CCCP-11137	Moldova	W/O	0	Damaged on landing at Kishinev Airport.	
17 October 1971	(Soviet Union) Dnepropetrovsk	An-2SKh	CCCP-70908	Ukraine	W/O	0	Crashed following the failure of the slat control cable.	
12 November 1971	(Soviet Union) Vinnytsia	An-24B	CCCP-46809	Ukraine	W/O	48/48	Stalled and crashed during a go-around at Vinnytsia Airport, inbound from Kiev as Flight N-63.	
13 November 1971	(Soviet Union) Kerch	An-24B	CCCP-46378	Ukraine	W/O	6/11	Struck power lines on approach to Kerch Airport. The aircraft was operating a Simferopol-Kerch passenger service as Flight N-639.	
22 November 1971	(Soviet Union) Yerevan	An-2R	CCCP-62760	Armenia	W/O	0	Written off after overrunning the runway on landing at an airstrip near Yerevan.	
29 November 1971	(Soviet Union) Aloja Airstrip	An-2R	CCCP-32207	Latvia	W/O	1/3	Crashed during crop-spraying after the pilot performed stunts at low altitude.	
1 December 1971	(Soviet Union) Saratov	An-24B	CCCP-46788	Privolzhsk	W/O	57/57	During the descent to Saratov the aircraft flew through cloud, during which ice built up on the airframe. The pilot attempted to increase engine power to correct the decrease in speed, but this failed. The aircraft lost control and entered a high rate of descent and crashed 13 km (8.1 mi) from the runway. The aircraft was operating a domestic scheduled Sverdlovsk–Ufa–Saratov passenger service as Flight 2174.	
8 December 1971	(Soviet Union) Damanka	An-2T	CCCP-98292	North Caucasus	W/O	1/2	The aircraft was being ferried from Maikop to the ARZ-421 overhaul facility at Vinnitsa, with a stopover at Kerch. The aircraft was flying too low, and deviated south of the flight route by 15 km (9.3 mi). Poor weather with bad visibility were encountered and the aircraft struck trees on top of a hill at 300 m (980 ft).	
9 December 1971	(Soviet Union) Tashkent Region	An-2T	CCCP-33164	Uzbekistan	W/O	0	Crashed on landing due to high winds.	
12 December 1971	(Soviet Union) Farikha Airstrip	An-2T	CCCP-55567	Northern	W/O	2/2	Crashed on takeoff. Shortly after takeoff, the aircraft entered the back side of the power curve, probably due to a loss of engine power. The aircraft lost altitude and crashed on the ice short of the runway and burned out. The aircraft was operating a Farikha–Naryan-Mar cargo service.	
29 December 1971	(Soviet Union) Khanty-Mansisk	An-2V	CCCP-50573	Tyumen	W/O	0	Crashed. The aircraft was overloaded.	
30 December 1971	(Soviet Union) Baranikha Airport	Il-14M	CCCP-91570	Magadan	W/O	0	Overran the runway.	
30 December 1971	(Soviet Union) Baikit	An-2T	CCCP-98348	Krasnoyarsk	W/O	0	Crashed while flying too low.	
22 February 1972	(Soviet Union) Lipetsk	An-24	CCCP-46732	Central	W/O	0/13	Crashed after the pilot accidentally activated the thrust reversers while the aircraft was on approach to Lipetsk Airport. The aircraft was operating a domestic scheduled Moscow-Lipetsk service as Flight 25.	
27 February 1972	(Soviet Union) Mineralnye Vody	An-24B	CCCP-46418	North Caucasus	W/O	0	Lost control and crashed on approach to Mineralnye Vody Airport, after an unintentional application of the thrust reversers.	
February 1972	(Soviet Union) Rostov Airport	An-10	CCCP-11142	Ukraine	W/O	Unknown	Burned out at the ARZ-412 maintenance facility at Rostov Airport.	
19 March 1972	(Soviet Union) Omsk	Tu-104B	CCCP-42408	East Siberia	W/O	0	Struck a snow wall on landing at Omsk Airport following several landing attempts.	
26 March 1972	(Soviet Union) Sterlitamak	An-2R	CCCP-29380	Privolzhsk	W/O	0	Crashed due to icing.	
27 March 1972	(Soviet Union) Voroshilovgrad	An-2	CCCP-42621	Ukraine	W/O	1/1	Taking off from Voroshilovgrad (now Luhansk), the pilot decided to commit suicide due to marital problems. The pilot flew the aircraft into a four-story building where he lived, damaging several apartments and catching fire in the process. Although there were no injuries in the building, the pilot died on impact.	
11 April 1972	(Soviet Union) Yukagir Village	An-2T	CCCP-44937	Yakut	W/O	1/3	Lost control and crashed on a flapless take-off at the Yukagir Village, Ust-Yansky District.	
14 April 1972	(Soviet Union) Vyyezdoye	An-2R	CCCP-01506	Privolzhsk	W/O	2/2	The aircraft had been performing crop-spraying flights. On the 30th flight the aircraft struck a high-voltage power line while flying against the sun and then crashed into a water-filled ravine.	
4 May 1972	(Soviet Union) Bratsk	Yak-40	CCCP-87778	East Siberia	W/O	18/18	Crashed into trees and burnt up when it was pushed down by a downdraft on approach to Bratsk Airport, inbound from Irkutsk as Flight B-608.	
5 May 1972	(Soviet Union) Poltava Region	An-2R	CCCP-25604	Ukraine	W/O	2/2	During a crop-spraying flight, the pilot, who was drunk, performed low-altitude stunts over a village. Control was lost and the aircraft crashed into a building.	
8 May 1972	(Soviet Union) Argyz District	An-2R	CCCP-45192	Tajikistan	W/O	2/2	During a crop-spraying flight, the aircraft took off in the direction of a forest. The aircraft struck tree tops shortly after takeoff, crashed in the forest and caught fire.	
12 May 1972	(Soviet Union) Kirensk	An-2TP	CCCP-50506	East Siberia	W/O	0	Force-landed following engine failure.	
18 May 1972	(Soviet Union) Kharkov	An-10A	CCCP-11215	Ukraine	W/O	122/122 (Note: There exists a discrepancy over the number of fatalities, as it was claimed to be 108, and 122.)	Operating a domestic scheduled passenger service as Flight 1491, crashed 24 kilometres (15 mi) off Kharkiv on approach to the city airport, inbound from Moscow, when both wings separated from the fuselage. Aeroflot retired its An-10 fleet from service following this event.	
15 June 1972	(Soviet Union) Rechka	An-2R	CCCP-02692	Northern	W/O	2/2	While operating a crop-spraying flight for the "Peredolski" state farm the engine lost power, due to deposits on the intake valves. The aircraft lost power and crashed into a horse stable on the banks of the Luga River.	
28 June 1972	(Soviet Union) Shiringa	An-2R	CCCP-02582	East Siberia	W/O	4/4	While crop-spraying for the "Yeravninski" state farm the crew made an unauthorized flight from Shininga. The aircraft lost altitude while in a turn and crashed.	
28 June 1972	(Soviet Union) Kzyl-Orda	An-2R	CCCP-35313	Ukraine	W/O	0	Crashed while crop-spraying.	
29 June 1972	(Soviet Union) Astrakhanka District	An-2R	CCCP-46652	Kazakhstan	W/O	1/2	While crop-spraying the aircraft lost control while performing a right turn at low altitude, probably due to failure of the right-hand rudder control cable. The aircraft crashed and burned out.	
11 July 1972	(Soviet Union) Okha	An-2	CCCP-98280	Far East	W/O	2/2	Shortly after takeoff the aircraft encountered thick fog at 35–40 m (115–131 ft). The pilot then turned around but the aircraft lost airspeed, stalling and crashing on the shore of Pvernaya Bukhta Bay and burned out. The aircraft was operating an Okha–Tsimmermanovka cargo service.	
19 July 1972	(Soviet Union) Yenotayevka	An-2R	CCCP-15283	North Caucasus	W/O	1/1	Crashed in steppe 7 km (4.3 mi) west of Yenotayevka Airfield and burned out. The pilot was drunk.	
28 July 1972	(Soviet Union) Ust-Kuiga	An-2T	CCCP-32649	Yakut	W/O	0	Force-landed following engine failure.	
4 August 1972	(Soviet Union) Aldan	Il-14M	CCCP-91537	Yakut	W/O	0	Destroyed by fire in a forced landing attempt due to an engine failure, shortly after take-off from Aldan Airport. Due to operate a domestic scheduled Aldan–Chulman passenger service.	
11 August 1972	(Soviet Union) Kherson	An-2	CCCP-01526	Ukraine	W/O	14/19	Banked right, rolled left then right and crashed on final approach. The aircraft had encountered wake turbulence from a Mi-6 helicopter that had passed through the approach path 45 seconds prior. Due to complete a Novooleksiivka–Kherson passenger service as Flight D-44.	
13 August 1972	(Soviet Union) Yuzhno-Sakhalinsk	An-2T	CCCP-01147	Far East	W/O	0	Force-landed following a loss of engine power.	
26 August 1972	(Soviet Union) Arkhangelsk	Il-18B	CCCP-75663	Northern	W/O	0	Crashed upon landing in fog at Talagi Airport.	
30 August 1972	(Soviet Union) Perevitsy	An-2R	CCCP-32520	Central	W/O	2/2	During a crop-spraying flight for the "Vrachevo-Gorki" state farm, the aircraft encountered thick smoke from area peat fires. The pilots became disorientated, allowing the aircraft to lose altitude until it crashed into the bank of the Oka River.	
30 August 1972	(Soviet Union) Suntar	An-2R	CCCP-49369	Yakut	W/O	0	While transporting a cargo of fuel barrels, a fire started in the cargo hold. Although a forced landing was performed, the aircraft burned out.	
31 August 1972	(Soviet Union) Smelovskiy	Il-18V	CCCP-74298	Kazakhstan	W/O	101/101	A fire broke out in the cargo hold, at 7,200 metres (23,600 ft), while the aircraft was covering a domestic scheduled Alma-Ata–Moscow passenger service as Flight 558. The crew attempted to make an emergency landing at Magnitogorsk. During the descent, the airplane entered a spinning dive from an altitude of 2,400 metres (7,900 ft), and crashed near Smelovskiy.	
10 September 1972	(Soviet Union) Velikaya Vulyga	An-2M	CCCP-02369	Ukraine	W/O	2/2	The aircraft was being ferried back to Vinnitsa from Velikaya Vulyga following a crop-spraying flight. Before takeoff, however, the crew, who was drunk, forgot to remove clamps on the rudder and stabilizer. The aircraft banked left on takeoff at 10–15 m (33–49 ft), lost altitude and crashed and burned out some 500 m (1,600 ft) from where it was parked.	
13 September 1972	(Soviet Union) Semipalatinsk Region	An-2R	CCCP-33233	Kazakhstan	W/O	0	While attempting to take off from poor terrain, the aircraft crashed.	
1 October 1972 (Note: Both the date of occurrence and the number of fatalities are discrepant for this accident. It is claimed it took place on 1 October, or 2 October; the death toll was reported to be 109, or 100.)	(Soviet Union) Adler	Il-18V	CCCP-75507	Moscow	W/O	109/109	Crashed into the Black Sea shortly after takeoff from Sochi Airport, 4 kilometres (2.5 mi) off the shore. Due to operate a domestic scheduled Adler–Moscow passenger service as Flight 1036.	
6 October 1972	(Soviet Union) Cherski	An-2P	CCCP-70738	Yakut	W/O	0	Force-landed following engine failure.	
13 October 1972	(Soviet Union) Moscow	Il-62	CCCP-86671	International	W/O	174/174 (Note: Figures for the death toll of this accident are discrepant, as the number of fatalities was reported to be 174, or 176.)	Crashed into a lake after several landing attempts into Sheremetyevo Airport, approximately 6 kilometres (3.7 mi) east of the airport. The aircraft was operating a domestic non-scheduled Paris–Leningrad–Moscow passenger service as Flight 217.	
4 November 1972	(Soviet Union) Kursk	An-24B	CCCP-46202	Privolzhsk	W/O	0	Crashed after it contacted trees on approach to Vostochny Airport.	
5 November 1972	(Soviet Union) Udskoye	An-2	CCCP-32585	Far East	W/O	9/9	Banked left, lost altitude and crashed three minutes after takeoff while performing a left turn. The pilot was drunk. Due to begin a Udskoye–Chumikan–Tugur–Nikolayevsk-on-Amur passenger service as Flight 372.	
13 November 1972	(Soviet Union) Yeniseisk	An-2TP	CCCP-09676	Krasnoyarsk	W/O	2/14	While on a flight from Nazimoto to Yeniseisk the engine lost power, due to contaminated fuel. The crew decided to make a forced landing in a forest 40 km (25 mi) northwest of Yeniseisk, but the aircraft struck trees, crashed and caught fire.	
14 November 1972	(Soviet Union) Lensk	An-2R	CCCP-91726	Yakut	W/O	0	Unknown	
21 November 1972	(Soviet Union) Vorkuta	An-12TB	CCCP-11360	Moscow	W/O	0/8	Landed short of the runway at Vorkuta Airport, ending up in a ravine.	
22 November 1972	(Soviet Union) Krasnoyarsk	Yak-40	CCCP-87819	Krasnoyarsk	W/O	0	Crashed on takeoff from Krasnoyarsk Airport due to icing conditions.	
3 December 1972	(Soviet Union) Yerbogachon	An-2TP	CCCP-41306	East Siberia	W/O	0	Force-landed following engine failure.	
21 January 1973	(Soviet Union) Petukhovo	An-24B	CCCP-46276	North Caucasus	W/O	39/39	Crashed into the snow near Petukhovo, apparently after it was hit by a surface-to-air missile while en route to Perm Airport. There were 39 people on board. Despite a few of them surviving the accident, they later died because of the low temperatures, before the rescue team reached the crash site. The aircraft was operating a domestic scheduled Kazan-Perm passenger service as Flight 6263.	
17 February 1973	(Soviet Union) Amderma	An-12BP	CCCP-11341	Polar	W/O	0	Hard landing at Amderma Airport.	
19 February 1973	(Czechoslovakia) Prague	Tu-154	CCCP-85023	International	W/O	66/100	Crashed on approach to Ruzyne Airport. While completing an international scheduled Moscow-Prague passenger service as Flight 141 the aircraft suddenly lost height and struck the ground, probably due to turbulence.	
24 February 1973	(Soviet Union) Off Ura-Tyube	Il-18V	CCCP-75712	Tajikistan	W/O	79/79	Broke up at a height of 2,200 metres (7,200 ft) as it spun, crashing 40 kilometres (25 mi) away from Ura-Tyube. The aircraft was operating a domestic scheduled Dushanbe–Leninabad passenger service as Flight 630.	
28 February 1973	(Soviet Union) Semipalatinsk	Yak-40	CCCP-87602	Kazakhstan	W/O	32/32	Seconds after getting airborne, the airplane fell back to the runway at Semipalatinsk Airport for reasons unknown. Due to operate a domestic scheduled Semipalatinsk–Ust-Kamenogorsk passenger service as Flight X-167.	
6 March 1973	(Soviet Union) Graham Bell Island	An-12AP	CCCP-11994	Unknown	W/O	0/7	Crashed on landing. Wreckage remains at the crash site.	
6 March 1973	(Soviet Union) Serov	An-2T	CCCP-93467	Ural	W/O	0	Force-landed following a loss of engine power.	
7 March 1973	(Soviet Union) Smolensk	An-2R	CCCP-70816	Central	W/O	0	Force-landed following engine failure.	
9 March 1973	(Soviet Union) Kondinskoye	An-2	CCCP-01262	Tyumen	W/O	3/3	The aircraft was on a positioning flight from Elushkino to Kondinskoye. The pilot and passenger (the director of Kondinskoye Airport) were both drunk. The aircraft entered a dive and crashed in a snow-covered swamp near Lake Khattavtur some 57 km (35 mi) west of Kondinskoye.	
24 March 1973	(Soviet Union) Ozyornaya	An-2	CCCP-05670	Far East	W/O	2/3	During a cargo flight from Ozyornaya to Ust-Bolsheretsk the pilot, who was drunk, intentionally deviated from the flight route. The aircraft entered clouds and struck the northern slope of a snow-covered mountain at 350 m (1,150 ft).	
14 April 1973	(Soviet Union) Andreyevka	An-2R	CCCP-35547	Kazakhstan	W/O	1/6	During a ferry flight from Andreyevka to a state farm in Almaty for crop-spraying, the pilot decided to fly over the Chubundy mountain range rather than flying around it. The aircraft then encountered poor weather and later crashed on a mountain top at 1,200 m (3,900 ft).	
24 April 1973	(Soviet Union) Leningrad	Tu-104B	CCCP-42505	Northern	W/O	2/57	The aircraft was en route from Shosseynaya Airport to Moscow as Flight 2420 when it was hijacked by a person demanding to go to Stockholm. Despite an explosive device exploding in flight when the landing gear was lowered, killing the flight engineer and the hijacker and blowing a hole in the right side of the airframe, it landed safely at the airport of departure.	
3 May 1973	North Pole	Li-2T	CCCP-04244	Yakut	W/O	0/9	The aircraft took off from North Pole-21 drifting station to an ice floe in an area called "Point 4". After landing on the ice floe, the thickness was measured at 55 cm (22 in). The aircraft was parked and experiments began. When the ice was drilled to install instruments, the thickness was found to be 47 cm (19 in). Realizing that the ice was too thin for the aircraft to stay parked long-term, the crew decided to fly to another ice floe. The aircraft taxied to the end of the airstrip for takeoff, but it broke through the ice. The crew set up camp and were rescued by an An-2 two days later.	
7 May 1973	(Soviet Union) Vnukovo Airport	Tu-154	CCCP-85030	Moscow	W/O	0/4	During a training flight, the crew took off with the inner spoilers deployed. This caused severe vibrations and a loss of power in two engines. The crew made a forced landing in a forest.	
11 May 1973	(Soviet Union) Off Semipalatinsk	Il-18B	CCCP-75687	Azerbaijan	W/O	63/63	The aircraft was en route a domestic scheduled Tashkent–Novosibirsk passenger service as Flight 6551, when it crashed 84 kilometres (52 mi) south of Semipalatinsk, after it broke up at 5,000 metres (16,000 ft), possibly due to a steep emergency descent.	
11 May 1973	(Soviet Union) Kursk	An-2M	CCCP-05915	Central	W/O	0	Force-landed following engine failure.	
14 May 1973	(Soviet Union) Vologda	An-2R	CCCP-70569	Northern	W/O	0	Crashed. The aircraft was overloaded.	
18 May 1973	(Soviet Union) Off Chita	Tu-104A	CCCP-42379	East Siberia	W/O	82/82	Hijacked en route a domestic scheduled Irkutsk–Chita passenger service as Flight 109 by a passenger who demanded to be flown to China. Negotiations between the crew and the hijacker broke down and the hijacker was shot and mortally wounded by the onboard air marshal. As he lay dying, the hijacker managed to detonate a bomb he had with him, blowing the aircraft out of the sky and it crashed east of Lake Baikal, 97 kilometres (60 mi) west of Chita.	
20 May 1973	(Soviet Union) Starobeshevo District	An-2R	CCCP-55798	Ukraine	W/O	1/2	While on a crop-spraying flight for the "Gornyak" state farm, the aircraft lost altitude, crashed and caught fire while performing a right turn at 50 m (160 ft).	
21 June 1973	(Soviet Union) Abakan	An-2R	CCCP-09228	Krasnoyarsk	W/O	2/3	While on a crop-spraying flight for the "Rossiya" state farm, the aircraft entered a downward spiral while turning at 15–20 m (49–66 ft) and crashed in a field.	
25 June 1973	(Soviet Union) Irkutsk	An-2R	CCCP-32558	East Siberia	W/O	0	Struck obstacles while flying too low.	
30 June 1973	(Jordan) Amman	Tu-134A	CCCP-65668	Armenia	W/O	9/85	Crashed into a house and broke in three after it failed to get airborne at Marka International Airport. The aircraft was due to operate a scheduled Amman–Beirut international passenger service as Flight 512. Two occupants of the aircraft died, as well as seven people on the ground.	
4 July 1973	(Soviet Union) Off Shakhtyorsk	Il-14M	CCCP-91534	Far East	W/O	18/18	Flew into the side of a mountain 53 kilometres (33 mi) away from Shakhtyorsk when it made a premature descent.	
9 July 1973	(Soviet Union) Kuybyshev	Tu-124V	CCCP-45062	Privolzhsk	Repaired	2/61	Eleven minutes after takeoff from Kuybyshev Airport, while climbing to 6,600 m (21,700 ft), the right engine suffered an uncontained failure. Debris penetrated the fuselage, killing two passengers and injuring another four. Panicking passengers moved towards the front, causing the center of gravity to move forward. The passengers were seated and the aircraft landed safely. The aircraft was operating a Kuybyshev-Simferopol passenger service as Flight 5385.	
20 July 1973	(Soviet Union) Saatli District	An-2T	CCCP-79827	Azerbaijan	W/O	1/2	During crop-spraying the engine failed at 20–25 m (66–82 ft) due to a bird strike. Because of the terrain, a forced landing was not possible. While the crew was performing a left turn the aircraft struck a canal embankment and crashed.	
26 July 1973	(Soviet Union) Ordzhonikidze	An-2R	CCCP-35559	North Caucasus	W/O	0	Crashed after the pilot failed to recover from a stall.	
2 August 1973	(Soviet Union) Shakhty	An-2R	CCCP-70807	North Caucasus	W/O	0	Hard landing.	
2 August 1973	(Soviet Union) Chumikan	An-2R	CCCP-33242	Far East	W/O	0	Crashed due to engine failure.	
8 August 1973	(Soviet Union) Arkhangelsk Airport	Yak-40	CCCP-87790	Arkhangelsk	W/O	1/31	On takeoff, the crew attempted to lift the nose of the aircraft, but the elevators were locked. The aircraft ran off the runway, running through shrubs, striking the localizer antenna and finally crashing into a concrete and catching fire. An electrical failure caused the elevators to lock during takeoff; the pilot should have aborted the takeoff rather than continue. Due to operate a domestic scheduled Arkhangelsk–Kotlas passenger service as Flight A-547.	
13 August 1973	(Soviet Union) Uelen	An-2	CCCP-23722	Magadan	W/O	0	Crashed in poor weather.	
16 August 1973	(Soviet Union) Kotui River	An-2V	CCCP-41373	Krasnoyarsk	W/O	0	Crashed on the bank of the Kotui River while flying too low.	
18 August 1973	(Soviet Union) Off Baku	An-24B	CCCP-46435	Azerbaijan	W/O	56/64	Shortly after takeoff from Baku Airport the left engine failed. The crew retracted the flaps and began a left turn, but while turning the left wingtip struck a cable on an oil rig at Neftyanyye Kamni oilfield. The aircraft entered a descent, striking a pipeline and crashed near a highway and caught fire. The aircraft was operating a domestic scheduled Baku–Fort-Shevchenko passenger service as Flight A-13.	
29 August 1973	(Soviet Union) Nerkha	An-2R	CCCP-28954	East Siberia	W/O	0	Crashed while flying too low.	
30 August 1973	(Soviet Union) Kyzyl	An-2TP	CCCP-09649	Krasnoyarsk	W/O	0	Crashed while flying at low altitude.	
8 September 1973	(Soviet Union) Bogashevo Airport	An-2R	CCCP-41913	West Siberia	W/O	3/3	During a training flight, the aircraft banked left at 100–120 m (330–390 ft), rapidly lost altitude, and crashed 230 m (750 ft) short of the runway and caught fire.	
15 September 1973	(Soviet Union) Samarkand region	An-2R	CCCP-32213	Privolzhsk	W/O	0	On takeoff, the landing gear hit an earth wall and the aircraft crashed.	
30 September 1973	(Soviet Union) Sverdlovsk	Tu-104B	CCCP-42506	Uzbekistan	W/O	108/108	Loss of control following take-off from Koltsovo Airport. Due to operate a domestic scheduled Sverdlovsk–Khabarovsk passenger service as Flight 3932.	
2 October 1973	(Soviet Union) Magadan	An-12TB	CCCP-12967	Yakut	W/O	10/10	Deviated some 6 kilometres (3.7 mi) from the extended centerline on approach to Magadan Airport and crashed into a hillside. The aircraft was operating a Yakutsk-Magadan cargo service as Flight 10178F.	
5 October 1973	(Soviet Union) Mount Khuuta	An-2	CCCP-04340	Tyumen	W/O	0/8	During a flight from Mys Kamenny to Vorkuta in support of a military unit the crew intentionally deviated from the fight route by 45 km (28 mi). The crew descended to 300 m (980 ft) in poor visibility and struck the side of Mount Khuuta. All eight on board survived and were evacuated by helicopters.	
10 October 1973	(Soviet Union) Tashauz	Li-2	CCCP-71209	Turkmenistan	W/O	5/5	Stalled and crashed soon after takeoff from Tashauz Airport, when one engine failed and the other lost power. Due to begin a Tashauz–Darvaza-Ashkhabad cargo service as Flight 112. All civil Li-2s were retired as a result of this accident.	
11 October 1973	(Soviet Union) Goris	An-2	CCCP-70880	Armenia	W/O	0	Crashed while flying too low.	
13 October 1973	(Soviet Union) Moscow	Tu-104B	CCCP-42486	Georgia	W/O	122/122	The aircraft was about to complete a domestic scheduled Tbilisi–Moscow passenger service as Flight 964 when it crashed on approach to Domodedovo Airport following an electrical power failure. This crash is the worst ever accident involving the Tu-104.	
20 October 1973	(Soviet Union) Kazan Airport	Tu-124V	CCCP-45031	Privolzhsk	W/O	0	The aircraft touched down too late and too fast on a snow-covered runway. Unable to slow down, the aircraft ran off the runway, struck an obstacle and came to rest 617 m (2,024 ft) from the end of the runway. Cause attributed to crew errors.	
25 October 1973	(Soviet Union) Nyrob	An-2R	CCCP-01609	Ural	W/O	0	Crashed on takeoff due to overloading.	
27 October 1973	(Soviet Union) Kolpashevo	An-2P	CCCP-70408	West Siberia	W/O	0	Crashed on takeoff after the aircraft had not been completely de-iced.	
2 November 1973	(Soviet Union) Moscow	Yak-40	CCCP-87607	Central	Unknown	2/31	Ten minutes before landing at Bryansk, inbound from Moscow as Flight 19, the aircraft was hijacked by four hijackers that demanded money and to be flown to Sweden. After taking the passengers as hostages, the hijackers attempted to storm the cockpit. After determining that there were hijackers on board, the pilot shouted the information to the crew and locked the cockpit door. The hijackers managed to break the lock on the door and demanded the crew fly to Moscow. While on the way to Moscow, the hijackers demanded a US$1.5 million ransom for all hostages as well as information on future airliner hijacking groups. Despite bad weather at Moscow, the aircraft landed safely. Negotiations began and two injured hostage were released, but the hijackers issued more demands: the aircraft be refueled and be given half the ransom for releasing half of the hostages. The hijackers then planned to fly to Leningrad, release the remaining hostages and refuel for the flight to Sweden. It was decided to storm the aircraft and five policemen hid a suitcase of fake money near the aircraft. Several hours later the hijackers were informed that the authorities were ready to transfer the money. One hijacker opened the cabin door and another hijacker opened fire on the officers, who returned fire. One hijacker died of his injuries. The aircraft was struck by machine gun fire from an APC, suffering 90 hits. Tear gas was thrown inside, but one got stuck between the seats, starting a fire. Passengers panicked and fled the aircraft along with two of the hijackers; the fourth hijacker committed suicide. Two passengers were injured, but all survived.	
4 November 1973	(Soviet Union) Kirensk	An-2	CCCP-41978	East Siberia	W/O	0	Force-landed due to engine failure.	
7 December 1973	(Soviet Union) Moscow	Tu-104B	CCCP-42503	Georgia	W/O	16/75	Inbound from Kutaisi at above-normal speed, the aircraft crashed when one wing touched the ground as the crew tried to slow it down for landing at Domodedovo Airport. The aircraft was operating a domestic scheduled Kutaisi-Moscow passenger service as Flight 964.	
16 December 1973	(Soviet Union) Karacharovo	Tu-124V	CCCP-45061	Lithuania	W/O	51/51	On approach to Vnukovo Airport inbound from Vilnius, control was lost at 8,000 m (26,000 ft) due to a short circuit in the elevator trim system. The aircraft was operating a domestic passenger service as Flight 2022.	
19 December 1973	(Soviet Union) Sanatorny	An-2R	CCCP-40521	Ural	W/O	2/2	While en route to Shurma the aircraft encountered poor weather with snow and bad visibility. The aircraft encountered severe icing conditions between Urzhum and Shurma. Control was lost due to icing and the aircraft crashed in a snow-covered field.	
21 December 1973	(Soviet Union) Yerevan	Yak-40	CCCP-87629	Armenia	W/O	0	Hard landing in fog at Erebuni Airport.	
23 December 1973	(Soviet Union) Vynnyky	Tu-124V	CCCP-45044	Privolzhsk	W/O	17/17	Strong vibrations created by a defective turbine blade in one engine caused the rupture of the fuel line, starting a in-flight fire in the airframe, that was due to operate a domestic scheduled Lvov–Kiev passenger service as Flight 5398. The aircraft crashed near Vynnyky shortly after takeoff from Sknyliv Airport.	
24 December 1973	(Soviet Union) Khantaiskoye Ozero	An-2V	CCCP-32448	Krasnoyarsk	W/O	1/2	The aircraft was operating a Dudinka–Khantaiskoye Ozero cargo service. The crew cut the route short, but could not establish their position due to poor visibility. The crew did not realize that the frequency of the radio beacon at their destination had been changed. While descending, the aircraft struck a mountain slope at 1,016 m (3,333 ft).	
1974	Antarctica	Li-2T	CCCP-04243	Yakut	W/O	Unknown	Crashed.	
6 January 1974	(Soviet Union) Mukachevo	An-24B	CCCP-46357	Ukraine	W/O	24/24	Was operating a domestic scheduled Ivano-Frankovsk–Uzhgorod passenger service as Flight H-75 when it attempted to land at the Mukachevo Air Base as the airport of destination was temporarily closed. On approach, the aircraft flew through clouds in icing conditions, yet the de-icing system was switched off; it lost longitudinal stability and crashed.	
22 January 1974	(Soviet Union) Yegorlykskaya District	An-2R	CCCP-33225	North Caucasus	W/O	2/2	While crop-spraying for the "im. Kirova" state farm in poor weather with poor visibility, the pilot descended to locate the airstrip but the aircraft crashed in a snow-covered field and burned out.	
25 January 1974	(Soviet Union) Rostov-on-Don	An-24B	CCCP-46277	Privolzhsk	W/O	4/4	Crashed after takeoff from Rostov Airport.	
5 February 1974	(Soviet Union) Makhachkala	An-2R	CCCP-01579	North Caucasus	W/O	0	Crashed in poor weather.	
22 March 1974	(Soviet Union) Kirov Airport	Li-2	CCCP-73960	Ural	W/O	3/9	Crashed shortly after take-off due to an engine failure.	
6 April 1974	(Soviet Union) Ust-Kuyga	Avia 14P	CCCP-52053	Yakut	W/O	0/18	Unintentional retraction of the landing gear.	
9 April 1974	(Soviet Union) Kazan	Yak-40	CCCP-87369	Privolzhsk	W/O	0/34	Crashed at Kazan Airport after an engine fire.	
16 April 1974	(Soviet Union) Kutaisi	An-2	CCCP-33085	Georgia	W/O	0	Caught in a downdraft over mountainous terrain, the aircraft lost altitude and crashed.	
27 April 1974	(Soviet Union) Leningrad	Il-18V	CCCP-75559	Leningrad	W/O	109/109 (Note: There exists a discrepancy over the number of fatalities, as it was claimed to be 109, and 118.)	Crashed shortly after takeoff from Pulkovo Airport, during initial climbout, following a failure of the outer starboard engine. An asymmetric retraction of the flaps, amid a strong vibration of the airframe, led to the loss of control of the aircraft, which was due to operate a domestic scheduled Leningrad–Krasnodar passenger service.	
1 May 1974	(Soviet Union) North Pole-22	An-12B	CCCP-12950	Krasnoyarsk	W/O	1/16	Hit an ice pinnacle during an emergency take-off, crashing and catching fire.	
2 May 1974	(Soviet Union) Rostov-on-Don	Yak-40	CCCP-87398	Central	W/O	1/38	Crashed following an aborted take-off at Rostov Airport. The aircraft was operating a Lipetsk-Rostov on Don-Mineralnye Vody passenger service as Flight 1255.	
9 May 1974	(Soviet Union) Ivano-Frankovsk	Il-18V	CCCP-75425	Ural	W/O	0/75	The aircraft overran the 500-metre-long (1,600 ft) airstrip it was mistakenly landed on at Ivano-Frankovsk Airport, ending up in a ravine and breaking in two.	
13 May 1974	(Soviet Union) Crimea	An-2	CCCP-23664	Ukraine	W/O	0	Struck a mountain. The crew were attempting to cut their route short over mountains.	
19 May 1974	(Soviet Union) Samarkand region	An-2SKh	CCCP-25487	Uzbekistan	W/O	0	Fell back on the runway during a tail-wind takeoff.	
23 May 1974	(Soviet Union) Gorenychi	Yak-40	CCCP-87579	Ukraine	W/O	29/29	Entered a high-speed descent and crashed on approach to Zhulyany Airport. Suspected flight crew intoxication with carbon monoxide. The aircraft was operating the second leg of a domestic scheduled Leningrad–Khmelnitskiy-Kiev–Kirovograd passenger service as Flight H-166.	
24 June 1974	(Soviet Union) Tashkent	Il-18E	CCCP-75405	Uzbekistan	W/O	1/115	Suffered a bird strike shortly after takeoff from Yuzhny Airport. The aircraft, climbing through 10–15 m (33–49 ft), descended and crashed. Due to operate a domestic scheduled Tashkent–Sverdlovsk passenger service as Flight 5139.	
29 June 1974	(Soviet Union) Demidovo (near Nizhny Karachan)	An-2M	CCCP-02383	Central	W/O	1/1	During a crop-spraying flight for the "im. Dimitrova" collective farm, the engine failed. The aircraft was flying over a forest at 80–90 m (260–300 ft) when it lost altitude, struck tree tops, and crashed upside-down in the forest and burned out.	
4 July 1974	(Soviet Union) Usinsk Airport	An-2	CCCP-92836	Komi	W/O	2/2	The pilot, who was drunk, flew too low. The aircraft struck tree tops and crashed in a forest clearing.	
27 July 1974	(Soviet Union) Sasovo	An-2TP	CCCP-35029	Sasovo Flight School	W/O	3/3	A fully upward deflection of the elevator trim tab caused the airplane to lose control and crash.	
28 August 1974	(Soviet Union) Andryushkino	An-2V	CCCP-04302	Yakut	Repaired	0	Damaged struts collapsed on landing, causing the left lower wing to tear off.	
18 October 1974	(Soviet Union) Yeniseysk	An-12B	CCCP-11030	East Siberia	W/O	1/12	The aircraft hit trees on approach to Yeniseysk Airport when the airplane descended below the glidepath in bad weather, crashing some 1,900 metres (6,200 ft) short of the runway.	
1 November 1974	(Soviet Union) Surgut	An-2	CCCP-70766	Tyumen	W/O	14/14	Mid-air collision with a Mi-8T. The aircraft was operating a domestic scheduled Khanty-Mansiysk–Surgut passenger service, while the helicopter had left Surgut bound for Nefteyugansk. 24 people aboard the helicopter also perished in the accident.	
5 November 1974	(Soviet Union) Chita	Tu-104B	CCCP-42501	Far East	W/O	0	Overran the runway on landing at Chita Airport, crashing into a railway embankment.	
5 November 1974	(Soviet Union) Aleksandrovskoye Airport	An-2TP	CCCP-91730	West Siberia	W/O	0/0	While parked at the airport, the aircraft was blown over during a storm.	
14 November 1974	(Soviet Union) Kiev	Il-14M	CCCP-91515	Ukraine	W/O	6/6	Lost control and crashed on fire shortly after take-off from Zhulyany Airport.	
4 December 1974	(Soviet Union) Irkutsk	An-12B	CCCP-12985	East Siberia	W/O	0	Both aircraft collided in the air when the An-2R, just departing Irkutsk Airport, crossed the path of the An-12B that was on a training flight. The accident was caused by air traffic controllers error, who cleared the An-2R for take-off.	
4 December 1974	(Soviet Union) Irkutsk	An-2R	CCCP-49342	East Siberia	W/O	13/13	Both aircraft collided in the air when the An-2R, just departing Irkutsk Airport, crossed the path of the An-12B that was on a training flight. The accident was caused by air traffic controllers error, who cleared the An-2R for take-off.	
8 December 1974	(Soviet Union) Kiev region	An-2R	CCCP-05783	Ukraine	W/O	0	Crashed due to fuel exhaustion.	
9 December 1974	(Soviet Union) Kirensk	An-2T	CCCP-44917	East Siberia	W/O	0	Lost control and crashed after the cargo shifted.	
14 December 1974	(Soviet Union) Bukhara	Yak-40	CCCP-87630	Tajikistan	W/O	7/19	Aborted takeoff from Bukhara Airport, overrunning the runway and hitting a dike. Was due to operate a domestic scheduled Bukhara–Samarkand passenger service as Flight 124.	
24 December 1974	(Soviet Union) Baturino	An-2	CCCP-15890	West Siberia	W/O	1/3	Some five to six minutes before arrival at Baturino the engine failed at 200 m (660 ft). The crew performed a forced landing on a frozen marsh but the aircraft contacted tops of dead trees and crashed. The aircraft was completing a Tomsk–Baturino cargo service as Flight 107.	
27 December 1974	(Soviet Union) Khabarovsk	An-2R	CCCP-06911	Far East	W/O	0	Crashed due to overloading.	
1975	Unknown	An-2R	CCCP-09233	Ural	W/O	Unknown	Undercarriage collapse on hard landing.	
16 January 1975	(Laos) Sam Neua	An-2P	CCCP-70417	Ukraine	W/O	12/12	Crashed into a mountain in poor weather at night near Sam Neua Airport. The aircraft was operating a domestic non-scheduled Vientiane-Sam Neua passenger service.	
28 January 1975	(Soviet Union) Zaporozhye Airport	Yak-40	CCCP-87825	Ukraine	W/O	0/17	Before departure, the aircraft was cleared of snow, but due to continued snowfall the wings were covered in snow again. Snow was blown off the right wing during run-up. After lift-off the aircraft banked left and touched down on the left landing gear. Although takeoff was aborted, the aircraft ran off the runway and the left wing struck a building of a meteorological post. Due to operate a domestic scheduled Zaporozhye–Ternopol passenger service.	
12 February 1975	(Soviet Union) Krasnoyarsk	Il-18V	CCCP-75801	MUTA	W/O	0	Both nosegear and port main gear legs collapsed as the aircraft undershoot the runway when attempting to land in bad weather at Yemelyanovo Airport.	
15 April 1975	(Soviet Union) Omsk	An-2TP	CCCP-70177	Kazakhstan	W/O	13/14	Stalled following takeoff from Omsk Airport, banking to the left, crashing, and catching fire. The gust locks had not been disengaged before takeoff due to a maintenance error. Due to operate an Omsk–Leningradskoe–Kokchetau passenger service as Flight 454.	
28 April 1975	(Soviet Union) Poltava	An-24RV	CCCP-46476	Ukraine	W/O	0/11	The aircraft descended below the glidepath and crashed short of the runway at Poltava Airport.	
30 April 1975	(Soviet Union) Tambov	An-2SKh	CCCP-06444	Central	W/O	0/2	Lost altitude and crashed in a field while crop-spraying.	
18 May 1975	(Soviet Union) Birobidzhan	An-2R	CCCP-70426	Far East	W/O	0	The aircraft was flying a turn while low on fuel. Air entered the fuel system, causing the engine to quit and the aircraft crashed.	
19 May 1975	(Soviet Union) Mestia	An-2T	CCCP-07960	Georgia	W/O	0	The aircraft crashed shortly after takeoff after it was caught in a strong downdraft.	
20 May 1975	Unknown	An-2	CCCP-43908	Yakut	W/O	Unknown	Destroyed on landing.	
19 June 1975	(Soviet Union) Markovo	An-2T	CCCP-41932	Magadan	W/O	0	Crashed while flying in poor weather.	
28 June 1975	(Soviet Union) Karaganda	An-2T	CCCP-02132	Kyrgyzstan	W/O	0	Struck terrain while flying too low.	
15 July 1975	(Soviet Union) Batumi	Yak-40	CCCP-87475	Armenia	W/O	40/40	Struck a mountain following a go-around at Chorokh Airport. Was operating a domestic scheduled Yerevan–Batumi passenger service as Flight E-15.	
23 July 1975	(Soviet Union) Termez	An-2R	CCCP-70235	Tajikistan	W/O	0	Crashed while crop-spraying.	
9 August 1975	(Soviet Union) Bagdarin	Il-14M	CCCP-52056	Leningrad	W/O	11/11	The airplane went off the approach pattern to Bagdarin Airport and struck a wooded hillside in a cloudy scenario.	
15 August 1975	(Soviet Union) Krasnovodsk	Yak-40	CCCP-87323	Azerbaijan	W/O	23/28	Crashed on final approach to Krasnovodsk Airport after the airplane descended below the glideslope due to an incorrect position of the flaps. It was completing a domestic scheduled Baku–Krasnovodsk passenger service as Flight A-53.	
30 August 1975	(Soviet Union) Mogilev region	An-2R	CCCP-70506	Belarus	W/O	4/4	The aircraft was operating a medical flight to deliver a sick patient to a hospital in Mogilev. After landing in Krasnopole the crew reported that the engine would not start due to a defective starter. A second An-2 (CCCP-35443) was flown over with technicians, and the patient was loaded on this An-2. The crew stayed overnight at the airport. Replacing the starter failed to fix the problem, and another An-2 (CCCP-16018) was flown over with technicians. The battery was switched out and the engine started. The aircraft took off for Mogilev, but communication was later lost. Wreckage was found near Maly Khutora; the pilots were drunk and had lost control.	
30 August 1975	(Soviet Union) Novosibirsk	Tu-104B	CCCP-42472	Ukraine	W/O	0	Main undercarriage break-up upon hard landing at Tolmachevo Airport.	
18 September 1975	(Soviet Union) Off Turukhansk	An-2V	CCCP-98302	Krasnoyarsk	W/O	3/3	Flew into a 410-metre-high (1,350 ft) hill, 72 kilometres (45 mi) northwest of Turukhansk. The aircraft was operating a military service for the Soviet Air Force.	
6 October 1975	(Soviet Union) Kirov	Yak-40	CCCP-87328	Ural	W/O	0/32	Crashed at Kirov Airport following the failure of the three engines.	
22 October 1975	(Soviet Union) Novgorod	Yak-40	CCCP-87458	Latvia	W/O	11	The airplane was operating a domestic scheduled Syktyvkar–Vologda–Novgorod–Riga passenger service as Flight L-98. When it was about to complete its second leg, the flightcrew attempted an approach to Novgorod Airport, despite poor visibility. The aircraft went off course, and both the undercarriage and the wings contacted buildings, causing it to crash and catch fire. All 6 occupants aboard perished in the accident, plus 5 people on the ground.	
17 November 1975	(Soviet Union) Gali	An-24RV	CCCP-46467	North Caucasus	W/O	38/38	Went off course when trying to avoid a thunderstorm while en route a domestic scheduled Tbilisi–Sukhumi passenger service as Flight 6274. Crashed into a mountain 25 kilometres (16 mi) northeast of Gali.	
20 November 1975	(Soviet Union) Kharkov	An-24B	CCCP-46349	Belarus	W/O	19/50	Hit trees on approach to Kharkov Airport, inbound from Rostov-on-Don, crashing into a hillside 17 kilometres (11 mi) west of the airport. There was a discrepancy between the aircraft's barometric altimeter and the actual altitude. The aircraft was operating a domestic scheduled passenger service as Flight 7950.	
10 December 1975	(Soviet Union) Serafimovich	An-2R	CCCP-23691	North Caucasus	W/O	0	Crashed while flying too low in poor weather.	
13 December 1975	(Soviet Union) Nizhneangarsk	An-2R	CCCP-49280	East Siberia	W/O	0	Crashed while flying too low in poor weather.	
15 December 1975	(Soviet Union) Fergana	An-12B	CCCP-11005	Yakut	W/O	0	The landing gear was accidentally retracted on the take-off run at Fergana Airport.	
1976	(Soviet Union) Kiev	Tu-154	CCCP-85020	International	W/O	0	Hard landing.	
1976	(Soviet Union) Kiev	Tu-104A	CCCP-42371	East Siberia	W/O	Unknown	Undershot the runway on landing at Borispol Airport following an in-flight shutdown of the engines.	
1976	Unknown	An-12B	CCCP-11103	Northern	W/O	Unknown	Written off on 31 August 1976. Circumstances unknown.	
3 January 1976	(Soviet Union) Sanino	Tu-124V	CCCP-45037	North Caucasus	W/O	61/61	Crashed shortly after takeoff from Vnukovo Airport after the crew lost visual amid a cloudy environment and became disoriented. Due to operate a domestic scheduled Moscow–Brest passenger service as Flight 2003.	
13 January 1976	(Soviet Union) Leningrad	An-24B	CCCP-47280	Ural	W/O	0/45	Hit trees on approach to Smolnoye Airport when it descended below the glidepath, and crashed near Leningrad; the crew had disregarded the ground proximity warning system.	
30 January 1976	(Soviet Union) Frunze Airport	Il-18V	CCCP-75558	Kyrgyzstan	W/O	6/6	Crashed after control was lost during a go-around. The aircraft was on a training flight.	
9 February 1976	(Soviet Union) Irkutsk	Tu-104A	CCCP-42327	West Siberia	W/O	24/115	Suddenly banked some 20° right immediately after takeoff from Irkutsk Airport; the aircraft hit the ground moments later with the right wing down forming an even greater angle relative to the horizon. Due to operate a domestic scheduled Irkutsk–Novosibirsk passenger service as Flight 3739.	
6 March 1976	(Soviet Union) Verkhnyaya Khava	Il-18E	CCCP-75408	Armenia	W/O	111/111	The aircraft was operating a domestic scheduled Moscow–Yerevan passenger service as Flight 909, when it crashed on approach to Yerevan Airport. Due to an electrical failure, several instruments, including the heading indicator and the autopilot, were not functional at the time of the accident.	
10 March 1976	(Soviet Union) Saratov Airport	An-24RV	CCCP-46613	Privolzhsk	W/O	0	Hard landing. Overran the runway and crashed.	
24 March 1976	(Soviet Union) Ashgabat Airport	Il-14LIK	CCCP-61756	Kazakhstan	W/O	6/6	Struck a mountain in a cloudy environment.	
11 April 1976	(Soviet Union) Kazachinsk	An-2TP	CCCP-09675	East Siberia	W/O	Unknown	Crashed into mountainous terrain amid bad weather. All crewmembers perished in the accident, yet the number of fatalities was not disclosed. The aircraft was leased from Aeroflot.	
17 April 1976	(Soviet Union) Kursk	An-2SKh	CCCP-33170	Uzbekistan	W/O	1/2	During a crop-spraying flight for the "Oktyabr" kolkhoz (collective farm), the aircraft lifted off at low speed, stalled at 10–15 m (33–49 ft) and crashed.	
22 April 1976	(Soviet Union) Tula	An-2R	CCCP-01626	Central	W/O	0	Force-landed following a loss of engine power due to fuel starvation.	
15 May 1976	(Soviet Union) Chernigov	An-24RV	CCCP-46534	Ukraine	W/O	52/52	While flying at 5,700 m (18,700 ft), the rudder suddenly deflected 25° to the right, changing the roll angle and yaw. The pilots responded by adjusting the ailerons to reduce the roll, but a few seconds later the rudder deflected 9° and the elevators deviated, causing the aircraft to pitch up. The aircraft reached supercritical angles of attack and went into a tailspin. Following a high-speed descent the aircraft crashed. Due to operate a domestic scheduled Kiev–Moscow passenger service as Flight 1802.	
16 May 1976	(Soviet Union) Semipalatinsk	An-2SKh	CCCP-79935	Kazakhstan	W/O	1/1	The aircraft was performing a crop spraying mission, when it crashed after a steep turn near Semipalatinsk, killing the pilot, who was drunk.	
19 May 1976	(Soviet Union) Alaverdi	An-2R	CCCP-03547	Armenia	W/O	0	Crashed in bad weather.	
1 June 1976	(Equatorial Guinea) Bioko Island	Tu-154A	CCCP-85102	International	W/O	45/45	Crashed while en route its first leg into a 750-metre-high (2,460 ft) mountain. The aircraft was operating an international scheduled Luanda–Malabo–Kinshasa–Tripoli–Moscow passenger service as Flight 418. The cause was not determined, but radar failure was suspected.	
2 June 1976	(Soviet Union) Osokorka	Yak-40	CCCP-87541	Lithuania	W/O	0	Made an emergency landing on a wet meadow while approaching Kiev-Zhulhyany Airport after the flight engineer had accidentally shut down all 3 engines and the flight crew were unable to restart the engines. Everybody on board survived uninjured.	
9 June 1976	(Soviet Union) Anadyr	An-2	CCCP-23743	Magadan	W/O	0	Crashed in poor weather.	
12 June 1976	(Soviet Union) Nizhnevartovsk	An-2R	CCCP-32464	East Siberia	W/O	Unknown	Went off course on approach to Nizhnevartovsk Airport and crashed into mountainous terrain 4.5 km (2.8 mi) away from Nizhnevartovsk. All crewmembers died in the accident, yet the number of fatalities was undisclosed.	
20 June 1976	(Soviet Union) Engels	An-2R	CCCP-70819	Privolzhsk	W/O	2/2	Crashed in a field while in a banking attitude. The aircraft was performing a crop-spraying flight for state farm No. 592.	
26 June 1976	(Soviet Union) Kazan	An-2	CCCP-70764	Privolzhsk	W/O	1	Hit a transmission tower after it lost height due to a loss of power, crashed and was destroyed by fire.	
27 June 1976	(Soviet Union) Komsomolski District	An-2R	CCCP-70481	Ukraine	W/O	1/1	During a crop-spraying flight for the "Bestau" state farm, the crew, who were drunk, flew to Amangeldy. While the aircraft was parked, a drunk mechanic performed two flights; on the second flight the aircraft crashed on the banks of the Tolybai River and exploded.	
30 June 1976	(Soviet Union) Valikhanovskiy District	An-2R	CCCP-70531	Central	W/O	3/3	Experienced an in-flight failure on one of the propeller blades owing to fatigue. Violent vibrations caused the engine mount to fail, leading to the shift of the powerplant to the left, and causing the propeller to cut through the spar, which damaged the port wingbox. The aircraft eventually entered a spin and crashed.	
11 July 1976	(Soviet Union) Sivash Lagoon	An-2	CCCP-62439	Ukraine	W/O	0	Crashed after encountering poor weather.	
15 July 1976	(Soviet Union) Barnaul	An-2P	CCCP-05840	West Siberia	W/O	0	During a Zeminogorsk–Barnaul flight the engine failed due to fuel exhaustion, although the fuel gauge showed 150 L (40 US gal) of fuel. A forced landing was made in a forest and the aircraft suffered substantial damage as a result.	
17 July 1976	(Soviet Union) Chita Airport	Tu-104A	CCCP-42335	East Siberia	W/O	0/117	Failed to get airborne due to overloading.	
23 July 1976	(Soviet Union) Sokolskoye	An-2R	CCCP-35088	Central	W/O	Unknown	Hit trees and crashed; the crew was probably drunk.	
26 July 1976	(Soviet Union) Astrakhan	An-2R	CCCP-07285	North Caucasus	W/O	0	Crashed.	
3 August 1976	(Soviet Union) Popovka	An-2R	CCCP-70190	Central	W/O	Unknown	Crashed.	
13 August 1976	(Soviet Union) Guryev Airport	An-24B	CCCP-47734	Kazakhstan	W/O	0/43	While on approach to land at Guryev (now Atyrau) the aircraft deviated from the glide path. The aircraft landed hard at high speed and bounced twice. The aircraft came down hard again and suffered substantial damage.	
27 August 1976	(Soviet Union) Beryozovo	An-2V	CCCP-79852	Tyumen	W/O	0	The aircraft crashed following engine failure after the crew make a mistake in handling the fuel system	
9 September 1976	(Soviet Union) Black Sea	An-24RV	CCCP-46518	Belarus	W/O	64/64	Mid-air collision, 37 km (23 mi) south of Anapa of Aeroflot Flight 7957 and Flight S-31, involving an An-24 and Yak-40. The An-24RV was operating a passenger service between Donetsk and Adler with 46 people aboard. The Yak-40 was flying the Rostov-on-Don–Kerch route with 14 passengers and a crew of 4 on board.	
9 September 1976	(Soviet Union) Black Sea	Yak-40	CCCP-87772	North Caucasus	W/O	64/64	Mid-air collision, 37 km (23 mi) south of Anapa of Aeroflot Flight 7957 and Flight S-31, involving an An-24 and Yak-40. The An-24RV was operating a passenger service between Donetsk and Adler with 46 people aboard. The Yak-40 was flying the Rostov-on-Don–Kerch route with 14 passengers and a crew of 4 on board.	
26 September 1976	(Soviet Union) Novosibirsk	An-2	CCCP-79868	West Siberia	W/O	5	The pilot intentionally crashed the aircraft into a building where his former wife —from whom he had divorced— lived.	
2 October 1976	(Soviet Union) Khoito-Gol	An-2T	CCCP-01226	East Siberia	W/O	0	Crashed in the Vostochnyy Sayan Mountains.	
30 October 1976	(Soviet Union) Tashkent Airport	Il-18V	CCCP-75575	Uzbekistan	W/O	0/97	Overran the runway on landing in bad weather.	
28 November 1976	(Soviet Union) Moscow	Tu-104B	CCCP-42471	Northern	W/O	72/72	Crashed 29 km (18 mi) away from Sheremetyevo Airport amid inclement weather. Malfunction of the artificial horizon caused the pilots to become disorientated and exceed bank limits. Due to operate the Moscow–Leningrad route as Flight 2415.	
7 December 1976	(Soviet Union) Armavir	Yak-40	CCCP-87756	Ukraine	W/O	0/29	Due to fog the crew performed a go-around at Mineralnye Vody. The crew considered diverting to Stavropol but were informed by ATC that visibility was just 300 m (980 ft) there (it was actually 700 m (2,300 ft) which would have allowed a safe landing). The crew attempted another landing but had to go-around again. The crew then diverted to Armavir, but the aircraft ran out of fuel on final approach and a forced landing was made in an orchard some 1,745 m (5,725 ft) short of the runway. The aircraft was operating a domestic scheduled Dnepropetrovsk–Mineralnye Vody passenger service as Flight 929.	
16 December 1976	(Soviet Union) Zaporozhye	Yak-40	CCCP-87638	Ukraine	W/O	5/5	Crashed during a training flight after stalling, 20 km (12 mi) northwest of Zaporozhye.	
17 December 1976	(Soviet Union) Ust-Kut	Yak-40	CCCP-88208	East Siberia	W/O	7/7	Before takeoff, the left altimeter was set incorrectly, causing the altimeter to show 100 m (330 ft) than the actual altitude. The crew also did not realize that the stabilizer was also set incorrectly. On takeoff the aircraft rotated quickly and became airborne too soon. The crew retracted the flaps at too low speed and also lowered the pitch angle for acceleration. The crew did not realize that the aircraft was too close to the ground, because of the altimeter. The aircraft, operating a Ust-Kut–Kirensk cargo service, struck trees, crashed and caught fire.	
17 December 1976	(Soviet Union) Kiev	An-24	CCCP-46722	Ukraine	W/O	48/55	Flew below the glideslope amid reduced visibility on approach to Zhulyany Airport, eventually colliding with a concrete embankment. Was operating a domestic scheduled Chernovtsy–Kiev passenger service as Flight H-36.	
18 December 1976	(Soviet Union) Yuzhno-Sakhalinsk	Il-14RR	CCCP-61752	Far East	W/O	8/10	Deviated from the approach course to Yuzhno-Sakhalinsk Airport while operating a research flight and struck a mountain.	
13 January 1977	(Soviet Union) Alma-Ata	Tu-104A	CCCP-42369	Far East	W/O	96/96	The aircraft was operating a scheduled domestic Khabarovsk–Novosibirsk–Dushanbe passenger service as Flight 3843 when an engine caught fire. While dumping fuel to make an emergency landing at Alma-Ata Airport, the fire reached the fuel tanks, which exploded; the aircraft crashed 3.5 km (2.2 mi) away from the airport.	
15 February 1977	(Soviet Union) Mineralnye Vody	Il-18V	CCCP-75520	Uzbekistan	W/O	77/77	Stalled following a missed approach procedure and crashed near Mineralnye Vody. The aircraft was operating a domestic scheduled Tashkent-Yuzhniy Airport–Mineralnye Vody Airport passenger service as Flight 5003.	
6 March 1977	Unknown	An-2TP	CCCP-40572	Yakut	W/O	Unknown	Veered off the runway, crashing into a building.	
18 March 1977	(Soviet Union) Forish	An-2R	CCCP-09191	Uzbekistan	W/O	2/2	During crop-spraying the crew performed low altitude stunts. The aircraft stalled and crashed.	
30 March 1977	(Soviet Union) Zhdanov	Yak-40	CCCP-87738	Ukraine	W/O	8/27	The starboard wing hit a pole while on final approach to Zhdanov Airport. The aircraft banked and struck the ground before it broke up and caught fire. The aircraft was operating a domestic scheduled Dnepropetrovsk–Zhdanov passenger service.	
5 April 1977	(Soviet Union) Penyok	Il-14FKM	CCCP-61675	West Siberia	W/O	6/6	Crashed into the ground, following the loss of rudder control. The aircraft was on a training flight.	
7 May 1977	(Soviet Union) Tavda	An-2	CCCP-15925	Tyumen	W/O	29/29	Mid-air collision.	
7 May 1977	(Soviet Union) Tavda	An-2	CCCP-44992	Ural	W/O	29/29	Mid-air collision.	
7 May 1977	(Soviet Union) Ayanka Airstrip	An-2T	CCCP-23716	Far East	W/O	4/4	En route to Tilichiki the aircraft caught fire due to a fuel leak. The crew was incapacitated and lost control. The aircraft crashed on a frozen lake in tundra 20 km (12 mi) southeast of Ayanka.	
27 May 1977	(Cuba) Havana	Il-62M	CCCP-86614	International	W/O	69	Struck power lines on approach to José Martí International Airport, crashing and killing all but two of the 70 occupants of the aircraft, plus one more on the ground. The airplane was operating an international scheduled Moscow–Frankfurt–Lisbon–Havana passenger service as Flight 331.	
10 June 1977	(Soviet Union) Bukhara	An-2R	CCCP-55735	Uzbekistan	W/O	0	Force-landed due to a loss of engine power.	
8 July 1977	(Soviet Union) Off Sukhumi Airport	An-24RV	CCCP-46847	Kirovograd Flight School	W/O	6/7	Descended gradually until it crashed into the Black Sea, probably because the pilot became distracted with nearby storm activity. The aircraft was on a training flight from Sukhumi to Kirovograd (now Kropyvnytskyi).	
10 July 1977	(Finland) Helsinki Airport	Tu-134	CCCP-65639	Northern	W/O	0	Hijacked by two people demanding travel to Sweden. The aircraft diverted to Helsinki due to insufficient fuel, where the hijackers surrendered.	
14 July 1977	(Soviet Union) Khabarovsk	An-2R	CCCP-55723	Far East	W/O	0	Crashed. The aircraft was overloaded.	
19 July 1977	(Soviet Union) Alamedin	An-2R	CCCP-15274	Kyrgyzstan	W/O	0	Struck an obstacle during a go-around following an aborted approach.	
20 July 1977	(Soviet Union) Vitim	Avia 14M	CCCP-52096	East Siberia	W/O	39/40	Attempted a tailwind takeoff from Vitim Airport. The aircraft drifted off the runway, hit trees, stalled and crashed into a woodland. The aircraft was due to operate a domestic scheduled Vitim-Irkutsk passenger service as Flight B-2.	
21 July 1977	(Soviet Union) Kungrad	An-2R	CCCP-44617	Uzbekistan	W/O	0	Struck an obstacle on takeoff, suffering substantial damage.	
2 August 1977	(Soviet Union) Barysh Airstrip	An-2TP	CCCP-29316	Privolzhsk	W/O	0/24	The aircraft was operating a domestic scheduled Ulyanovsk–Nikolayevka passenger service. The pilot allowed 16 passengers on board for an unauthorized Barysh–Pavloka service. The overloaded aircraft failed to gain altitude on takeoff and struck trees 3 km (1.9 mi) past the runway, crashed and caught fire.	
18 August 1977	(Soviet Union) Ust-Kuyga	An-26	CCCP-26536	Yakut	W/O	0	Hard landing.	
29 August 1977	(Soviet Union) Omolon	An-2T	CCCP-01250	Magadan	W/O	0	Crashed in poor weather.	
30 August 1977	(Soviet Union) Jurbarkas	An-2	CCCP-32032	Lithuania	W/O	0	The collapse of the port main undercarriage upon crash landing led to an irreparable damage of the port wing.	
31 August 1977	(Soviet Union) Otrado-Olginski	An-2R	CCCP-32180	North Caucasus	W/O	2/2	Crashed.	
27 September 1977	(Soviet Union) Samarkand Region	An-2R	CCCP-33254	Uzbekistan	W/O	0	The crew mishandled the altitude compensator, causing the engine to quit. The aircraft force-landed and was written off.	
18 October 1977	(Soviet Union) Srednekolymsk	An-2T	CCCP-55625	Yakut	W/O	Unknown	Crashed.	
27 October 1977	(Soviet Union) Cape Chelyuskin	Il-14M	CCCP-04195	Krasnoyarsk	W/O	Unknown	Crashed after going off course on approach to Cape Chelyuskin Airport.	
28 November 1977	(Soviet Union) Chuya	An-2R	CCCP-70629	East Siberia	W/O	0	Unknown	
9 December 1977	(Soviet Union) Tarko-Sale	An-24RV	CCCP-47695	Tyumen	W/O	17/23	Crashed and caught fire upon takeoff from Tarko-Sale Airport because of an incorrect position of the flaps. Due to operate a domestic scheduled Tarko-Sale–Surgut passenger service as Flight 134.	
19 December 1977	(Soviet Union) Podkopayevo	An-2TP	CCCP-09696	Central	W/O	0	Force-landed due to loss of engine power, caused by fuel starvation.	
20 December 1977	(Soviet Union) Ukhta	An-2P	CCCP-07471	Komi	W/O	0	Force-landed following a loss of engine power.	
23 December 1977	(Soviet Union) Ekimchan	An-2R	CCCP-02708	Far East	W/O	0	Crashed. The aircraft was overloaded.	
1978	Unknown	An-12BP	CCCP-11125	Yakut	W/O	0	A vessel containing acid broke in the cargo hold while the aircraft was being loaded at some previous time.	
1978	(Soviet Union) Budyonnovsk	An-24B	CCCP-46350	Ukraine	W/O	0	At 6,000 m (20,000 ft) both engines failed due to icing. The crew was able to lower the landing gear manually but were unable to deploy the flaps. A forced landing was carried out and the nosegear collapsed during landing after which the right wing hit a concrete pillar. The aircraft was operating a Dnepropetrovsk (now Dnipro)–Baikonur service. The accident occurred in 1977 or 1978, before 9 November 1978.	
1 February 1978	(Soviet Union) Krasny	An-2TP	CCCP-40570	Central	W/O	Unknown	Collided with another An-2TP, tail number CCCP-40563, owing to air traffic controllers error. Landed safely, without any reported fatality on board. All occupants of CCCP-40563 perished in the accident.	
18 February 1978	(Soviet Union) Novosibirsk	Tu-154A	CCCP-85087	West Siberia	W/O	0	A fire that broke out in the passenger cabin engulfed the front part of the airframe. The aircraft was standing on the apron at Tolmachevo Airport. Rags, in combination with an unattended heater that had been left on, started the fire.	
4 April 1978	(Soviet Union) Muryuk	An-2T	CCCP-13716	West Siberia	W/O	0	Lost speed on takeoff, stalled and crashed.	
8 April 1978	(Soviet Union) Aldan Airport	Yak-40	CCCP-87911	Yakut	W/O	0/17	Stalled upon takeoff and crashed. Due to operate an Aldan–Irkutsk passenger service as Flight 401. The Yak-40's V_{2} speed was increased by 5 km/h (3.1 mph) due to instability at low speeds.	
1 May 1978	(Soviet Union) Ufa	An-2R	CCCP-01367	Privolzhsk	W/O	0	Crashed in poor weather.	
6 May 1978	(Soviet Union) Ashgabat	Il-18	Unknown	Unknown	Unknown	1	En route to Mineralnye Vody, the aircraft was hijacked by a passenger who demanded to be flown to Iran. He threatened the crew with a pistol and grenade. The co-pilot was shot, after which security forces shot and killed the hijacker. The aircraft was able to return safely to Ashgabat. It was later revealed that the pistol was homemade with starter gun ammo and that the grenade was a wooden fake.	
7 May 1978	(Soviet Union) Karnaukhovskiy	An-2R	CCCP-70493	North Caucasus	W/O	3/3	The aircraft was crop-spraying for the "Bolshevik" collective farm. Three days later a drunk pilot took two passengers on a flight from Novaya Tsimlaya to the collective farm's airstrip, but the aircraft crashed in a field and caught fire.	
19 May 1978	(Soviet Union) Maksatiha	Tu-154B	CCCP-85169	Azerbaijan	W/O	4/134	Crash-landed 5.3 km (3.3 mi) from Maksatiha, Tver Oblast, following the stoppage of all three engines soon afterwards the flight engineer accidentally disconnected the automatic transferring of fuel to the sump tank. The aircraft was operating a Baku–Leningrad passenger service as Flight 6709.	
29 May 1978	(Soviet Union) Pastavy	An-2P	CCCP-35188	Belarus	W/O	0/5	While on approach, the aircraft lost altitude and crashed into a road embankment near the airport.	
18 June 1978	Unknown	An-2R	CCCP-02846	Yakut	W/O	Unknown	Damaged beyond repair in an accident. No further details are available.	
25 June 1978	(Soviet Union) Vladivostok	An-2R	CCCP-09616	Far East	W/O	0	Crashed.	
11 July 1978	(Soviet Union) Makhachkala	An-2T	CCCP-79968	North Caucasus	W/O	0	Force-landed following engine failure.	
16 August 1978	(Soviet Union) Nukus	An-2TP	CCCP-40545	Uzbekistan	W/O	0	Crashed.	
8 September 1978	(Soviet Union) Yablunivka	An-2R	CCCP-35112	Ukraine	W/O	2/2	Lost altitude and crashed while crop-spraying. A first aid kit stored under the co-pilot's seat probably got stuck between the seat and steering column causing a loss of control of the stabilizer.	
23 September 1978	(Soviet Union) Novoaleksandrovsk	An-2R	CCCP-32079	North Caucasus	W/O	3/3	While on a crop-spraying flight for the "Lenin" collective farm, the crew, who were drunk, performed stunts. The aircraft crashed in a field and caught fire.	
29 September 1978	(Mongolia) Ulan-Bator	An-2R	CCCP-07278	Kazakhstan	W/O	0	Struck terrain for reasons unknown.	
2 October 1978	(Soviet Union) Tbilisi	Yak-40	CCCP-87544	Privolzhsk	W/O	0/30	Was operating a domestic scheduled Volgograd–Tbilisi passenger service. Experienced a hydraulic failure prior to land at Tbilisi Airport. The aircraft overran the runway following touchdown, hitting a concrete mast and breaking up in three.	
7 October 1978	(Soviet Union) Sverdlovsk	Yak-40	CCCP-87437	Kazakhstan	W/O	38/38	Experienced the failure of the port engine shortly after take-off from Koltsovo Airport, owing to icing conditions. The aircraft lost height and crashed into a hill. Due to operate a domestic Sverdlovsk–Kostanay passenger service as Flight 1080.	
13 October 1978	(Soviet Union) Mary	An-2R	CCCP-32515	Turkmenistan	W/O	0	Crashed. The aircraft was overloaded.	
17 October 1978	(Soviet Union) Lanovtsy	An-2R	CCCP-32599	Ukraine	W/O	2/2	The pilots became distracted during a crop-spraying flight over hilly terrain and as a result the aircraft struck the slope of a hill.	
18 October 1978	(Soviet Union) Nizhnevartovsk	An-2P	CCCP-02457	West Siberia	W/O	0	The aircraft took off without having been completely cleared of snow and ice. Controlling the aircraft became difficult and the crew made a forced landing in swampy terrain. The aircraft then caught fire.	
23 October 1978	(Soviet Union) Sivash	An-24B	CCCP-46327	North Caucasus	W/O	26/26	Crashed in the Gulf of Sivash after experiencing dual engine flameout due to icing conditions while en route at 2,400 metres (7,900 ft). The aircraft was operating a domestic scheduled Krasnodar-Simferopol passenger service as Flight 6515.	
10 November 1978	(Soviet Union) Makhachkala Airport	An-24B	CCCP-46789	North Caucasus	W/O	1	While operating a domestic scheduled Groznyy–Baku passenger service, a passenger attempted to hijack the aircraft to Turkey. Although the hijacker injured the flight engineer, he was killed himself when a bullet ricocheted off a cockpit door he was firing at. The aircraft was able to land safely at Makhachkala but was written off on 27 February 1979 after it apparently suffered some damage in the incident.	
14 November 1978	(Sweden) Stockholm	Tu-154B-1	CCCP-85286	International	Repaired	0/74	Overran the runway and crashed after the nose failed to lift up. The aircraft was operating an international scheduled Stockholm-Moscow passenger service as Flight 212.	
30 November 1978	Unknown	Unknown	Unknown	Unknown	Unknown	1	Hijacking. The aircraft was covering the Krasnodar–Baku route.	
9 December 1978	(Soviet Union) Cherskiy	An-26	CCCP-26547	Yakut	W/O	7/7	Lost control and crashed just after takeoff due to shifting cargo.	
19 December 1978	(Soviet Union) Samarkand	An-24B	CCCP-46299	Uzbekistan	W/O	5/5	Crashed on approach to Samarkand Airport with only one engine working.	
1979	Unknown	Tu-154B	CCCP-85131	Ukraine	W/O	0	Written off following a mercury spill in the cargo hold. The aircraft was withdrawn from use and used in the shooting of a movie before it was moved to an aeronautical school in Kryvyi Rih.	
2 January 1979	(Antarctica) Molodezhnaya Station	Il-14FKM	CCCP-04193	Central	W/O	3/14	Crashed on takeoff. At 70–80 m (230–260 ft) the aircraft suddenly entered a left bank and descended until it struck a glacier. The aircraft was caught by windshear and a loss of control resulted. The aircraft was operating transportation flights for personnel of the 24th Soviet Antarctic expedition.	
15 January 1979	(Soviet Union) Minsk	An-24B	CCCP-46807	Ukraine	W/O	13/14	The aircraft was operating a domestic scheduled Kiev–Minsk passenger service as Flight 7502 when it crashed 5.3 km (3.3 mi) northwest of Minsk-1 Airport, on approach, after control was lost following the loss of longitudinal stability; the pilot had prematurely switched off the de-icing system and the aircraft encountered icing conditions along its flight path when it flew through clouds.	
18 January 1979	(Soviet Union) Belgorod	L-410M	CCCP-67210	Central	W/O	3/3	Crashed while operating a training flight.	
12 March 1979	Unknown	An-2TP	CCCP-40594	Yakut	W/O	Unknown	Broke through the icy surface of a lake and sank.	
17 March 1979	(Soviet Union) Moscow	Tu-104B	CCCP-42444	Ukraine	W/O	58/119	A false fire alarm in one of the engines prompted the crew to fly the aircraft back to Vnukovo Airport. On approach to the airport in poor visibility, the airplane descended below the glideslope and one wing hit an electricity pylon, then contacted the top of a hill, and eventually crashed into a frozen field, where the airframe lost the wings and the cockpit. Cockpit- and wing-less, the fuselage slid for some 200 metres (660 ft) over the snowy surface before coming to rest. Due to operate a domestic scheduled Moscow–Odessa passenger service.	
20 March 1979	(Soviet Union) Chardzou	Yak-40K	CCCP-87930	Turkmenistan	W/O	0/34	Entered the wake turbulence of a Mil Mi-6 and crashed at Chardzhou Airport.	
22 March 1979	(Soviet Union) Liepāja	Tu-134A	CCCP-65031	Latvia	W/O	4/5	The aircraft was operating the last leg of an Omsk–Gorkiy–Liepāja cargo service when it went off its extended centerline on approach to Liepāja Airport as it descended below the glideslope in poor visibility, crashing and catching fire after hitting trees.	
26 March 1979	(Soviet Union) Baykit	An-26	CCCP-26569	Ural	W/O	4/12	The pilot allowed some passengers to travel to Baykit. While on approach to Baykit, ATC ordered the crew to carry out a missed approach because the runway was blocked. The pilot continued the approach and barely climbed until the aircraft struck a wooded hillside and crashed. The aircraft was operating a Yeniseisk–Baykit cargo service as Flight 37293.	
10 May 1979	(Soviet Union) Sochi	Il-18D	CCCP-75414	Ural	W/O	0/79	Overran the runway and crashed at Sochi Airport after an aborted takeoff.	
10 May 1979	(Soviet Union) Svidovets	An-2R	CCCP-06330	Ukraine	W/O	0	Crashed. The aircraft was overloaded.	
19 May 1979	(Soviet Union) Ufa	Tu-134A	CCCP-65839	Moldova	W/O	0/89	Landed at Ufa Airport with its wheel brakes locked, veering off the runway and causing the fuel tank to rupture, subsequently catching fire. The aircraft was operating the first leg of a domestic scheduled Novosibirsk–Ufa–Chisinau passenger service.	
31 May 1979	(Soviet Union) Tyumen	Tu-134A	CCCP-65649	Tyumen	W/O	0	The airplane experienced a tyre burst that ignited the hydraulic fluid upon touchdown at Tyumen Airport.	
16 June 1979	(Soviet Union) Petropavlovsk-Kamchatsky	An-2T	CCCP-44920	Far East	W/O	0/1	Stolen by a drunk pilot at Petropavlovsk-Kamchatsky Airport. The plane stalled in a low altitude maneuver and crashed upside down.	
3 July 1979	(Soviet Union) Krasnaya Polyana	An-2M	CCCP-02330	Ukraine	W/O	Unknown	Collided with a transmission tower while crop-spraying.	
3 August 1979	(Soviet Union) Leningrad	L-410M	CCCP-67206	Central	W/O	10/14	While on approach to Rzhevka Airport the right engine failed. The propeller could not be feathered and the crew performed a go-around. The aircraft banked right, entered a spin and crashed in a forest short of and to the right of the runway and caught fire. The aircraft was operating a domestic scheduled Smolensk–Velikiye Luki-Leningrad passenger service as Flight 1643.	
11 August 1979	(Soviet Union) Dneprodzerzhinsk	Tu-134AK	CCCP-65735	Belarus	W/O	178/178	Both aircraft were involved in a mid-air collision at an approximate altitude of 8,400 m (27,600 ft). The Tu-134AK had departed from Donetsk Airport and was en route to Minsk as Flight 7880 with 84 occupants aboard – 77 passengers and a crew of 7 – while the other aircraft was operating the last leg of a domestic scheduled Chelyabinsk–Voronezh–Kishinev passenger service as Flight 7628 with 94 people on board – 88 passengers and six crewmembers – All occupants of both aircraft died.	
11 August 1979	(Soviet Union) Dneprodzerzhinsk	Tu-134A	CCCP-65816	Moldova	W/O	178/178	Both aircraft were involved in a mid-air collision at an approximate altitude of 8,400 m (27,600 ft). The Tu-134AK had departed from Donetsk Airport and was en route to Minsk as Flight 7880 with 84 occupants aboard – 77 passengers and a crew of 7 – while the other aircraft was operating the last leg of a domestic scheduled Chelyabinsk–Voronezh–Kishinev passenger service as Flight 7628 with 94 people on board – 88 passengers and six crewmembers – All occupants of both aircraft died.	
24 August 1979	(Soviet Union) Yeniseysk	An-12TB	CCCP-12963	Krasnoyarsk	W/O	11/16	The aircraft was en route from Norilsk to Krasnoyarsk on a cargo service when it crashed 18 km (11 mi) away from Yeniseysk following the flameout of all engines due to fuel contamination.	
29 August 1979	(Soviet Union) Kirsanov	Tu-124V	CCCP-45038	Privolzhsk	W/O	63/63	The crew lost control of the aircraft due to an extension of the flaps while en route from Borispol Airport to Kazan Airport. The airplane subsequently entered a spinning dive, disintegrating at an altitude of 3,000 m (9,800 ft) over Kirsanov because of the overstress the airframe underwent. It was operating a domestic scheduled Odessa–Kiev–Kazan passenger service as Flight 5484. Aeroflot withdrew the Tu-124 from service in the wake of this accident.	
3 September 1979	(Soviet Union) Amderma	An-24B	CCCP-46269	Arkhangelsk	W/O	40/43	The aircraft undershot the runway at Amderma Airport and crashed. On approach, the crew descended below the glidescope and the ground proximity warning system sounded, yet the crew continued to descend. The aircraft broke up after impact and the main wreckage came to rest 20–30 m from the Kara Sea. The aircraft was operating a domestic scheduled Arkangelsk-Amderma service as Flight A-513.	
20 September 1979	(Soviet Union) Malyushin Airfield	An-2R	CCCP-56413	Belarus	W/O	Unknown	Unknown	
13 October 1979	Unknown	An-2R	CCCP-70805	Yakut	W/O	Unknown	Crashed in an open field and was consumed by fire.	
27 October 1979	(Soviet Union) Lensk	An-2TP	CCCP-32322	Yakut	W/O	3/12	The rear door opened during takeoff. Two passengers left their seats to close the door, causing the center of gravity to move past the rear limit. The nose pitched up; the aircraft stalled and struck the runway. The aircraft was due to operate a domestic passenger service.	
30 October 1979	Off Denmark	Il-14M	CCCP-61683	Moscow SPiMVL	W/O	0/0	Destroyed by a fire that erupted aboard the ship (MV Olyenok) the aircraft was being carried upon.	
16 November 1979	(Soviet Union) Vologda	Yak-40	CCCP-87454	Leningrad	W/O	3/5	The aircraft was being ferried from Veliky Ustyug Airport to Vologda Airport as Flight 564 when it struck tree tops and crashed on approach to the airport of destination as it descended below the glideslope amid fog.	

== See also ==
- Aeroflot accidents and incidents
- Aeroflot accidents and incidents in the 1940s
- Aeroflot accidents and incidents in the 1950s
- Aeroflot accidents and incidents in the 1960s
- Aeroflot accidents and incidents in the 1980s
- Aeroflot accidents and incidents in the 1990s
- Transport in the Soviet Union
