= Aeroflot Flight 3630 =

1970 aviation accident

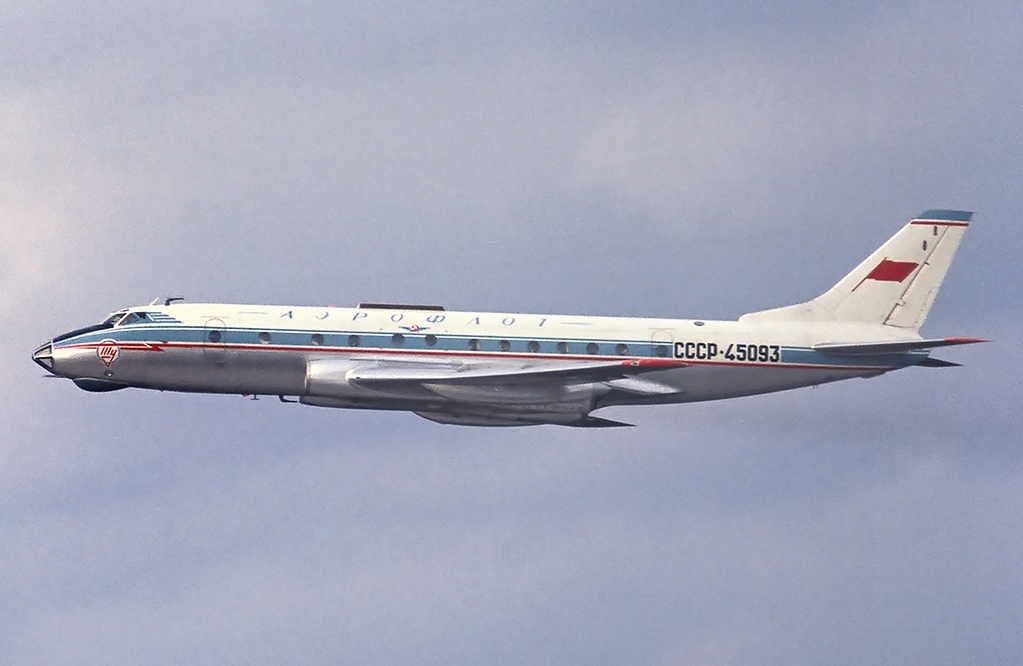
- A Tupolev Tu-124V similar to the accident aircraft

Accident
- Date: 2 September 1970
- Summary: Loss of control for reasons unknown
- Site: Near Dnipropetrovsk, Ukrainian SSR

Aircraft
- Aircraft type: Tupolev Tu-124
- Operator: Aeroflot
- Registration: CCCP-45012
- Flight origin: Mineralnye Vody Airport
- Stopover: Rostov-on-Don Airport
- Destination: Vilnius Airport
- Occupants: 37
- Passengers: 32
- Crew: 5
- Fatalities: 37
- Survivors: 0

Aeroflot Flight 3630 was a regularly scheduled passenger flight operated by Aeroflot from Mineralnye Vody, Stavropol Krai, to Vilnius, capital of Lithuania SSR with a stop over at Rostov-on-Don Airport. On 2 September 1970, the Tu-124 operating this flight crashed after a loss of control at cruise altitude, 42 minutes after takeoff from Rostov-on-Don Airport. All 32 passengers and five crew members were killed.

The Air Accident Investigation Commission was unable to discover the root cause of the accident.

== Accident ==
After a brief stopover, Flight 3630 departed Rostov-on-Don Airport at 14:55 MSK - Moscow time and at 15:14 reported passing over Donetsk at 8,400 meters. A short time later air traffic control (ATC) requested a rapid climb to 9,000 metres (30,000 ft) to avoid traffic and at 15:16 the flight reported reaching 9,000 metres (30,000 ft). At 15:31 the crew contacted ATC announcing in a calm tone their ground speed was 852 km/h (460 kn; 529 mph) and that they expected to pass over Kremenchug at 15:41 MSK. Then at 15:37 controllers received a short message from flight 3630 consisting of "Forty Five - Zero - Twelve", with the word "twelve" spoken with a frantic inflection. This was the last contact with the flight. The aircraft entered a steep pitch down as it rolled left, striking the ground at approximately a 70-degree angle at 950 km/h (513 kn; 590 mph).

== Aircraft ==
Construction of the Tu-124 involved, registration CCCP-45012, was completed at production factory 135 in Kharkiv, Ukraine, on 30 September 1961 and it was transferred to the civil air fleet. At the time of the accident, the aircraft had sustained a total of 7,504 flight hours and 6,996 cycles.

== Investigation ==
The aircraft created a deep cone-shaped crater at impact, destroying much of the airframe. The flight data recorder was damaged beyond recovery of any data but the Air Accident Investigation Commission were able to determine that the engines were set to idle power, the flaps, spoilers and landing gear were all in the retracted position and that rudder trim was full right with the left aileron trim full up.

Weather along the flight route was calm and ruled out as a possible cause.

Investigators looked into the possibility that the aircraft collided in flight with an unmanned military vehicle or a weather balloon but no evidence surfaced. The commission found no evidence of an in flight aircraft failure or structural break up. The right engine and other sections of the aircraft displayed damage due to fire and investigators considered that a fire in flight may have caused the accident. An examination of the victims found no smoke had been inhaled and further analysis of the crash site determined all fire damage occurred during the post crash fire so this possibility was ruled out.

The investigators were able to conclude that full deflection of the rudder and left aileron trim would have significant effects on control of the aircraft at cruising speed but the chain of events leading to the accident was never determined.

== See also ==
- Aeroflot accidents and incidents
- Aeroflot accidents and incidents in the 1970s
