= Aeroflot Flight 1661 =

1970 aviation accident in the Soviet Union

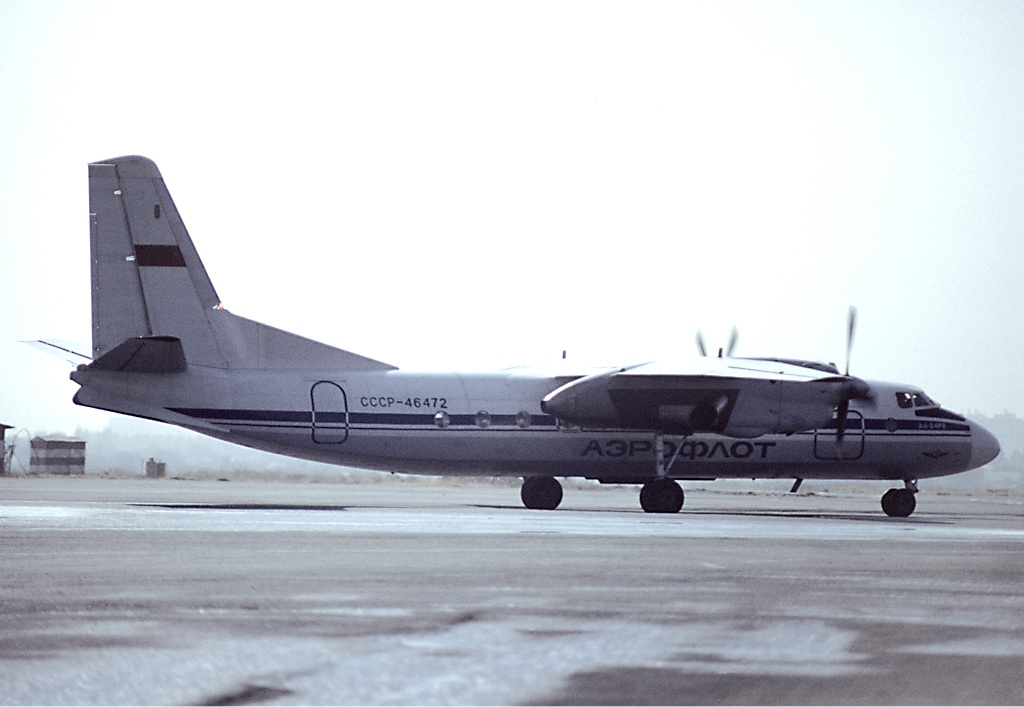
- An Antonov An-24 similar to the accident aircraft, this would later crash as the An-24 crash in Navoiy.

Accident
- Date: 1 April 1970
- Summary: Collision with weather balloon
- Site: 20 km southeast of Toguchin, Soviet Union

Aircraft
- Aircraft type: Antonov An-24B
- Operator: Aeroflot
- Registration: CCCP-47751
- Flight origin: Tolmachevo Airport, Ob
- Stopover: Yemelyanovo International Airport, Krasnoyarsk
- Destination: Bratsk Airport
- Occupants: 45
- Passengers: 40
- Crew: 5
- Fatalities: 45
- Survivors: 0

Aeroflot Flight 1661 was a passenger flight operated by an Antonov An-24 that crashed during its initial climb, 25 minutes after take-off from Tolmachevo Airport on 1 April 1970. All 45 people on board perished. An investigation revealed that the Antonov collided with a radiosonde, causing a loss of control.

== Accident ==
Flight 1661 was a scheduled domestic flight from Novosibirsk to Bratsk, Russia, with an intermediate stop at Krasnoyarsk. At 03:42 local time the An-24 departed Tolmachevo Airport from runway 25 on a heading of 251°. Shortly after take-off, the aircraft made a turn to the left, and at 03:53 contacted air traffic control (ATC) and reported their altitude as 4,200 meters. They then received clearance to continue climbing to 6,000 meters. At 04:10 ATC attempted to contact flight 1661, but no further transmissions from the Antonov were received. The crashed aircraft was found in a field approximately 142 km from Tolmachevo Airport; there were no survivors. Among the victims were the members of a youth ice hockey team, who were flying to a game.

== Aircraft ==
The Antonov An-24 involved was serial numbered 79901204 and registered as CCCP-47751 to Aeroflot. The airliner was built in 1967, and had compiled 3,975 flight hours with 3,832 take-off and landing cycles at the time of the crash.

== Investigation ==
Investigators examining the crash site discovered unusual damage to the aircraft's radome and nose structure, and noticed that a substantial portion of the windshield was missing. Also found among the wreckage were parts of two radiosondes of the type then being used by the Federal Service for Hydrometeorology and Environmental Monitoring for the monitoring of meteorological conditions. Investigators also discovered parts of the aircraft's nose cone six km away from the main crash site; these components displayed evidence of collision with a solid object. Officials concluded that the accident was caused by a collision in flight with a foreign object: the radiosonde/balloon assembly.

The investigation concluded that the aircraft's nose cone collided with a radiosonde, at a distance of 131 km from Tolmachevo, while ascending through 5,400 meters. The collision destroyed the aircraft's weather radar and damaged the cockpit. Out of control, the Antonov nosed over and began to descend rapidly. At an altitude of 2,000 meters and a speed of 700 km/h, the wing and horizontal stabilizer separated from the aircraft due to aerodynamic forces well beyond the plane's design limits. The fuselage then continued 2.5 km before striking the ground at 300 km/h and a vertical speed of 60 m/sec. The flight lasted 25 minutes, 25 seconds.

== See also ==
- Aeroflot accidents and incidents
- Aeroflot accidents and incidents in the 1970s
- List of accidents involving sports teams
