= Aeroflot Flight L-98 =

1975 aircraft accident

- An Aeroflot Yak-40 similar to the one involved

Accident
- Date: 22 October 1975
- Summary: Controlled flight into terrain due to pilot error and bad weather aggravated by ATC error
- Site: Veliky Novgorod, Novgorod Oblast, Russian SFSR
- Total fatalities: 11
- Total injuries: 8

Aircraft
- Aircraft type: Yakovlev Yak-40
- Operator: Riga OJSC, a unit of Aeroflot
- Registration: CCCP-87458
- Flight origin: Syktyvkar Airport, Syktyvkar, Russian SFSR
- 1st stopover: Vologda Airport, Vologda, Russian SFSR
- Last stopover: Novgorod Airport, Veliky Novgorod, Russian SFSR
- Destination: Riga International Airport, Riga, Latvian SSR
- Occupants: 6
- Passengers: 2
- Crew: 4
- Fatalities: 6
- Survivors: 0

Ground casualties
- Ground fatalities: 5
- Ground injuries: 8

Aeroflot Flight L-98 was a domestic flight in the Soviet Union en route from Syktyvkar – Vologda – Veliky Novgorod – Riga. On 22 October 1975, the Yakovlev Yak-40 crashed into buildings at Voskresensky Boulevard. All six occupants on board and five residents on the ground died, and an additional eight people on the ground were injured.

== Background ==
=== Aircraft and flight ===
The aircraft involved was a Yakovlev Yak-40 manufactured in 1974 and registered as CCCP-87458. It had accumulated 2,002 flight hours and 1,500 cycles.

The plane had been diverted to Rzhevka Airport, Leningrad on the previous flight due to bad weather at Veliky Novgorod, carrying 19 passengers and the 4 crew members. 17 passengers decided to board another flight.

=== Background ===
- Captain: Boris Vladimirovich Sizov
- Co-pilot: Oleg Anatolyevich Korzhenko
- Flight engineer: Nikolay Stepanovich Velesov
- Flight attendant: Svetlana Ivanovna Maksimova

== Accident ==
At 16:26 Moscow Time, as the weather at Veliky Novgorod improved, the plane took off from Rzhevka Airport. At 16:41, the crew reported their estimated time of arrival and requested for the instrument landing system for the landing. The crew was informed that the visibility of 2,300 metres with possible subsequent deterioration to less than 2,000 metres. In reality, the data was outdated and the accurate visibility was 50–100 metres due to dense fog.

At 16:45, because of the poor visibility, the plane veered 340 metres to the right of its glide path. At 16:53, as they emerged from the clouds at an altitude of 20 metres (65 feet), the right wing and landing gear were partially ruptured after striking a roof. Pilots lost control, and the plane crashed into a four-story residential building named Karl Marx Avenue No.3.

Firefighters, military personnel, ambulances, and KGB officers quickly arrived at the scene. The area around the house was cordoned off almost immediately.

Ten people died at the scene: the six occupants on the plane and four residents on the ground. Three days later, a woman died due to burns, adding the fatalities up to eleven. Eight other residents or bystanders were injured. (Note: Number of injuries were scattered around 8–9, but it was widely reported that the crash did indeed resulted in 9 ground injuries until the woman became the 11th fatality.)

== Investigation ==
The primary cause of the crash was concluded to be crew's premature descent in foggy conditions. When landing in fog, the crew mistakenly believed that they had flown over the marker and continued to descend 700 metres away from the glide path. A contributory factor was the air traffic controller failure to report updated weather information from the weather observer.

== Aftermath ==
After the crash, Karl Marx Avenue No.3 was reconstructed into an administrative building, where many government offices take place to this day.

Following the crash, the airport was relocated to the Krechevitsy Airport, but the construction was halted due to the lack of funding in 1987.
