= Aeroflot Flight 2003 =

1976 aviation accident

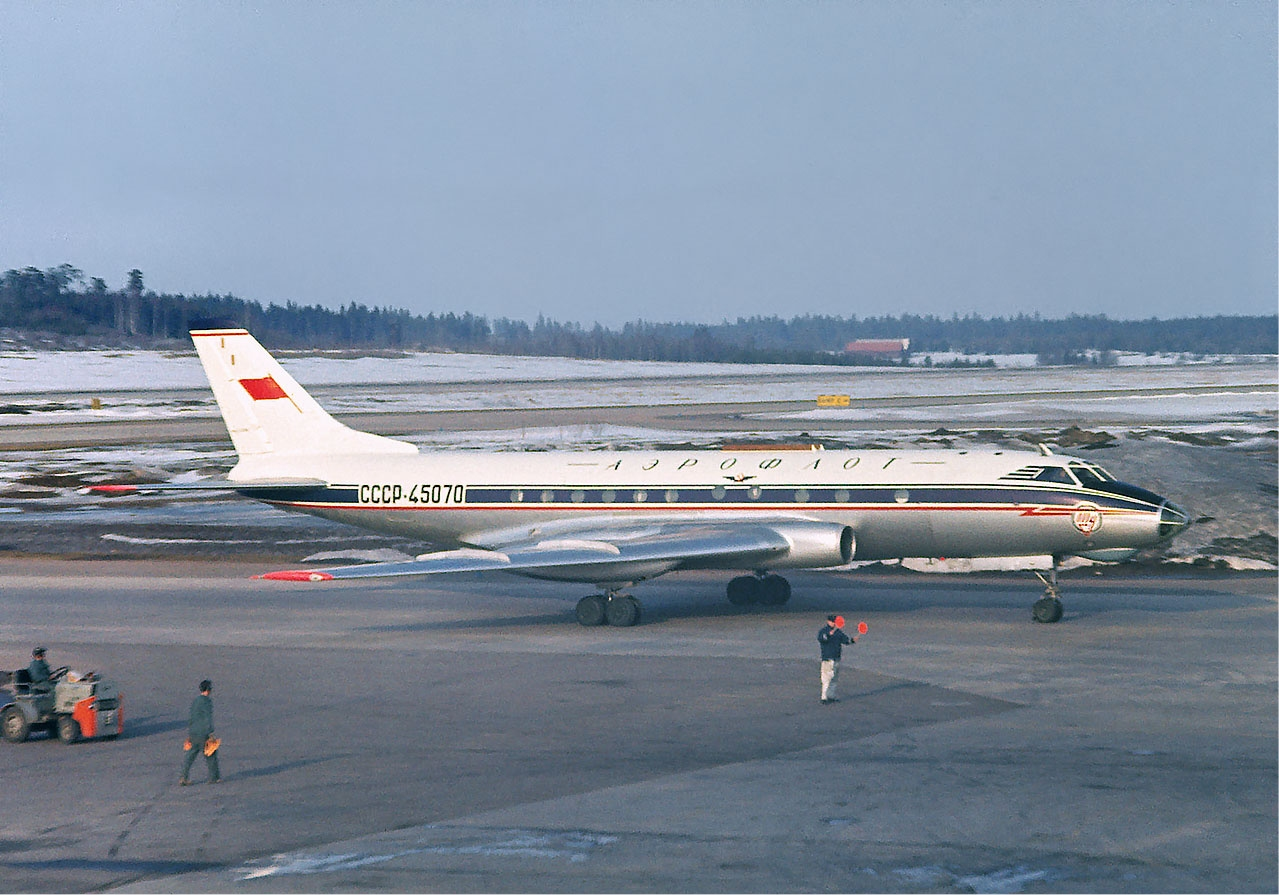
- An Aeroflot Tu-124, similar to the accident aircraft

Accident
- Date: 3 January 1976
- Summary: Instrument failure, spatial disorientation, loss of control
- Site: near Sanino, Moscow Oblast; 55°35′13″N 37°9′30″E
- Total fatalities: 62

Aircraft
- Aircraft type: Tupolev Tu-124V
- Operator: Aeroflot, Belarus Civil Aviation Directorate
- Registration: CCCP-45037
- Flight origin: Vnukovo International Airport, Moscow
- Stopover: Minsk-1 International Airport, Minsk
- Destination: Brest Airport, Brest
- Occupants: 61
- Passengers: 56
- Crew: 5
- Fatalities: 61
- Survivors: 0

Ground casualties
- Ground fatalities: 1

Aeroflot Flight 2003 was operated on 3 January 1976 by a Tupolev Tu-124, registration CCCP-45037, when it crashed 7 km (4.3 mi) after take-off from Moscow–Vnukovo Airport, on a domestic flight to Minsk-1 International Airport, and Brest Airport, Belarus. The crash killed all sixty-one on board and one in a house on the ground.

== Aircraft ==
The Tu-124V involved was completed on 29 January 1963 and entered service with Aeroflot as CCCP-45037 on 10 February in the same year. Initially built in a 44 passenger configuration, it was later upgraded to a 56 passenger configuration. At the time of the crash, the aircraft had logged 17012 hours 22 minutes and 14409 cycles.

== Accident ==
The aircraft was on initial climb-out following take-off; as it entered clouds both artificial horizons failed for unknown reasons, so the crew had no visual reference. As a result, the pilots became disorientated and lost control. The aircraft banked to the left, dived and crashed into a house 7 km (4.3 mi) from Vnukovo International Airport.

== See also ==
- Aeroflot accidents and incidents
- Aeroflot accidents and incidents in the 1970s
