= Sanatorny =

Sanatorny (Russian: Санаторный; masculine), Sanatornaya (Санаторная; feminine), or Sanatornoye (Санаторное; neuter) is the name of several inhabited localities in Russia.

Urban localities

- Sanatornoye, Republic of Crimea, an urban-type settlement under the administrative jurisdiction of the town of republic significance of Yalta in the Republic of Crimea

Rural localities

- Sanatorny, Kartalinsky District, Chelyabinsk Oblast, a settlement in Annensky Selsoviet of Kartalinsky District in Chelyabinsk Oblast
- Sanatorny, Yetkulsky District, Chelyabinsk Oblast, a settlement in Pechenkinsky Selsoviet of Yetkulsky District in Chelyabinsk Oblast
- Sanatorny, Chuvash Republic, a settlement in Chuvarleyskoye Rural Settlement of Alatyrsky District in the Chuvash Republic
- Sanatorny, Irkutsk Oblast, a settlement in Shelekhovsky District of Irkutsk Oblast
- Sanatorny, Novosibirsk Oblast, a settlement in Iskitimsky District of Novosibirsk Oblast; 54°42′N 83°1′E
- Sanatorny, Sverdlovsk Oblast, a settlement in Baltymsky Selsoviet under the administrative jurisdiction of the Town of Verkhnyaya Pyshma in Sverdlovsk Oblast
- Sanatornoye, Sakhalin Oblast, a selo under the administrative jurisdiction of the city of oblast significance of Yuzhno-Sakhalinsk in Sakhalin Oblast
- Sanatornaya, a village in Lesnikovsky Selsoviet of Ketovsky District in Kurgan Oblast; 55°19′N 65°19′E
