= Nizhny Karachan =

Nizhny Karachan Нижний Карачан
- Selo
- Location within Voronezh Oblast Location within Russia
- Coordinates: 51°20′N 41°46′E
- Country: Russia
- Region: Voronezh Oblast
- District: Gribanovsky District
- Time zone: UTC+3:00

Nizhny Karachan (Russian: Ни́жний Карача́н) is a rural locality (a selo) and the administrative center of Nizhnekarachansky Rural Settlement, Gribanovsky District, Voronezh Oblast, Russia. The population was 728 as of 2010. There are 47 streets.

== Geography ==
Nizhny Karachan is located 23 km southwest of Gribanovsky (the district's administrative centre) by road. Sredny Karachan is the nearest rural locality.
