= Aeroflot Flight 2174 =

1971 aviation accident in the Soviet Union

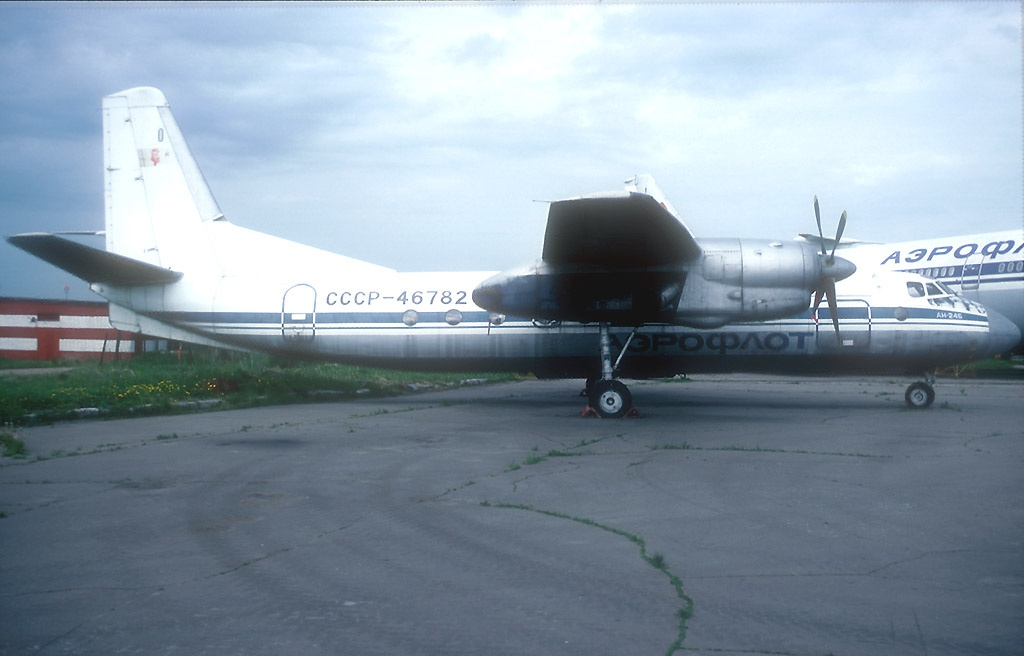
- CCCP-46782 sister ship of the accident aircraft

Accident
- Date: 1 December 1971
- Summary: Atmospheric icing leading to loss of control
- Site: 13 km northwest of Saratov Airport

Aircraft
- Aircraft type: Antonov An-24
- Operator: Aeroflot
- Registration: CCCP-46788
- Flight origin: Koltsovo Airport
- Destination: Saratov Tsentralny Airport
- Occupants: 57
- Passengers: 53
- Crew: 4
- Fatalities: 57
- Survivors: 0

Aeroflot Flight 2174 was a scheduled domestic passenger flight operated by an Antonov An-24B that crashed on approach to Saratov Tsentralny Airport on Wednesday 1 December 1971, resulting in the death of all 57 people on board. An investigation revealed the aircraft entered icing conditions leading to a loss of control.

== Accident ==
Flight 2174 was a scheduled passenger flight from Yekaterinburg to Saratov with a stop at Ufa. At 19:59 local time the Antonov departed Ufa International Airport and had an uneventful flight until it began the descent to Saratov Tsentralny Airport when the aircraft encountered icing conditions. As ice accumulated the crew added power to counter the effects of the ice build up but control of the aircraft was lost and it crashed at a high rate of descent 13 kilometers northwest of the runway and 1,130 meters to the right of its centerline with the landing gear and flaps retracted. There was a post crash fire and no survivors were found.

== Aircraft ==
The aircraft involved was an Antonov An-24B, serial number 57301801 and registered as CCCP-46788 to Aeroflot. The construction of the airliner was completed on 4 April 1965 and it had sustained a total of 10,913 flight hours and 8,544 takeoff and landing cycles before the crash.

== Investigation ==
Investigators discovered that under the conditions the aircraft was operating prior to the crash approximately 15 millimeters of ice would have developed creating significant drag and undermining the wings ability to generate lift. Investigators examining the wreckage found the anti-icing system switches in the off position and confirmed that the anti-ice was not operating during the crash sequence. The reason the anti-ice was not activated could not be determined.
