= Lipetsk Airport =

Airport in Lipetsk, Russia

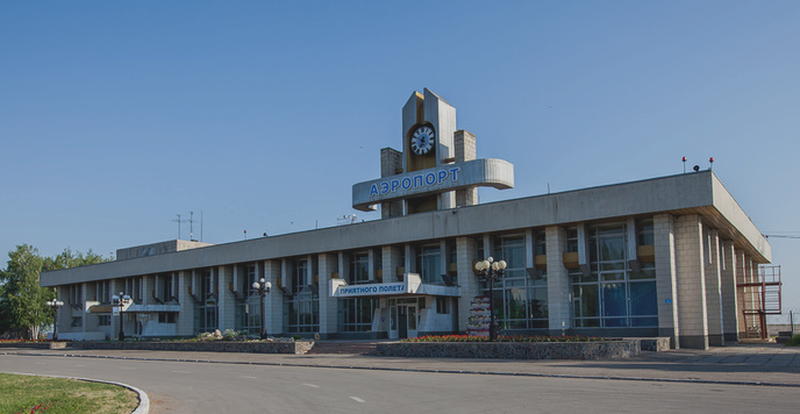
- IATA: LPK; ICAO: UUOL

Summary
- Airport type: Public
- Location: Lipetsk
- Elevation AMSL: 587 ft / 179 m
- Coordinates: 52°42′12″N 39°32′18″E
- Website: lipetsk-airport.ru
- Interactive map of Lipetsk Airport

Runways
Direction	Length		Surface
Direction	ft	m	Surface
15/33	7,546	2,300	Asphalt

Lipetsk Airport (Russian: Аэропорт Липецк) (IATA: LPK, ICAO: UUOL) is an airport in Lipetsk Oblast, Russia located 12 km north of Lipetsk. It is a smaller airfield north of city near Lipetsk Air Base. It handles small airliner traffic.

== Airlines and destinations ==
Airlines	Destinations
Nordwind Airlines	Seasonal: Simferopol
S7 Airlines	Moscow–Domodedovo, St. Petersburg; Seasonal: Anapa, Simferopol, Sochi

== See also ==
- List of airports in Russia
