= Aeroflot Flight U-45 =

1970 aviation accident in the Soviet Union

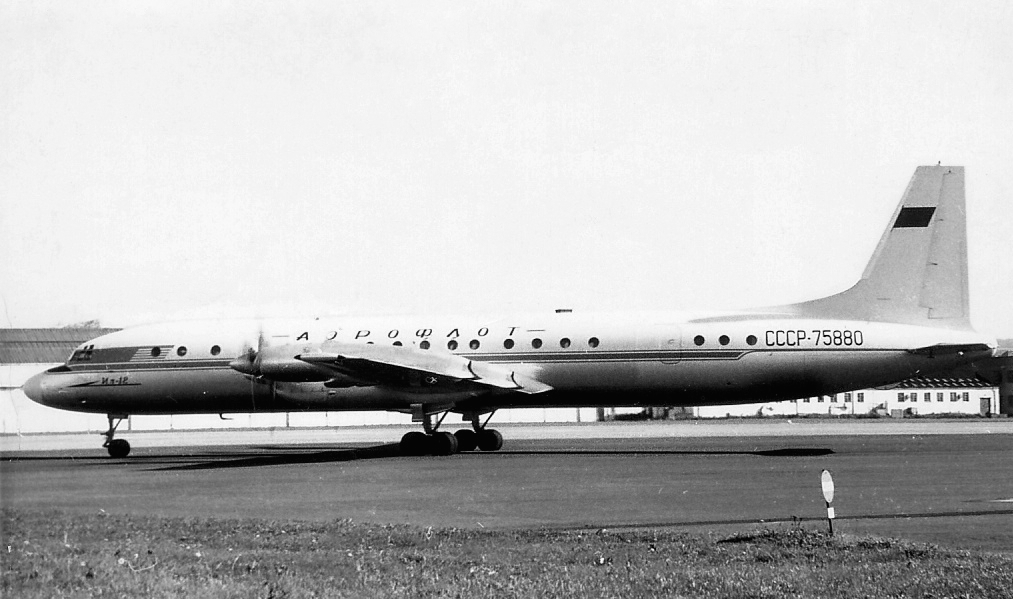
- An Ilyushin Il-18 similar to the accident aircraft

Accident
- Date: 6 February 1970
- Summary: Pilot and ATC errors, CFIT
- Site: 32 km northeast of Samarkand International Airport

Aircraft
- Aircraft type: Ilyushin Il-18
- Operator: Aeroflot
- Registration: CCCP-75798
- Flight origin: Tashkent International Airport
- Destination: Samarkand International Airport
- Passengers: 98
- Crew: 8
- Fatalities: 92
- Injuries: 14
- Survivors: 14

Aeroflot Flight U-45 was a passenger flight operated by an Ilyushin Il-18 that crashed during the approach to Samarkand on 6 February 1970, killing 92 of the 106 people on board. An investigation revealed the aircraft went below the minimum obstacle clearance altitude (MOCA) during approach to Samarkand International Airport.

== Accident ==
Flight U-45 was a scheduled domestic flight from Tashkent to Samarkand. At 14:11 Moscow time the Il-18 departed Tashkent International Airport and climbed to a cruising altitude of 5,100 meters in instrument meteorological conditions. At 14:33 ATC contacted Flight U-45 and gave permission to descend to 2,700 meters and reported their distance to Samarkand Airport at 93 kilometers. At 14:35 the controller advised the crew that they would use the approach to runway 27, but then at 14:36 due to a change in wind direction it was decided to use runway 09 and at 14:38 ATC reported the distance to the airport at 53 kilometers.

Nearing the airport Flight U-45 switched frequencies and contacted the approach controller at Samarkand Airport and at 14:39 were advised that the aircraft was 48 kilometers from the airport and granted permission to descend to 2,400 meters. The approach controller then misread his radar screen and reported the flight was 31 km out when in fact it was 42–44 km. This led to the aircraft descending too early before crossing a mountain range. The controller cleared the flight for landing on runway 09 and at 14:40 the crew accepted the clearance. This was the last transmission from flight U-45. At 14:42 at an altitude of 1,500 meters and 32 kilometers northeast of the airport the Il-18 crashed into the side of a mountain at a speed of 380 km/h while descending at seven meters per second. After the initial impact the aircraft separated into five pieces. The co-pilot and 13 passengers survived with injuries and the remaining 7 crew members and 85 passengers were killed.

== Aircraft ==
The aircraft involved was an Ilyushin Il-18B, serial number 182004303 and registered as CCCP-75798 to Aeroflot. The construction of the airliner was completed on 29 January 1962 and it had sustained a total of 12,885 flight hours and 4,968 takeoff and landing cycles before the crash.

== Investigation ==
Investigators determined that the primary cause of the accident was the approach controllers misinterpretation of the radar display, specifically that he didn't realize what scale setting the display was set to. It was also noted that the screen was of a dark resolution in a high ambient light setting. Several contributing factors were also identified. The organization and level of training of the ATC personnel at Samarkand International Airport was found to be subpar. Although the Il-18 was equipped with radar, its effectiveness was degraded substantially by the weather conditions so the crew had to rely on ATC information. At 14:39 the crew were advised that the aircraft was 48 kilometers from the airport, then 37 seconds later the controller stated they 31 km out. In order for the aircraft to cover 17 km in 37 seconds a speed of approximately 1600 km/h would be needed, impossible for an Il-18. Unfortunately the crew missed this important clue and continued the descent into the mountain.

== See also ==
- Aeroflot accidents and incidents
