= Aeroflot Flight 3012 =

1970 aviation incident in the Soviet Union

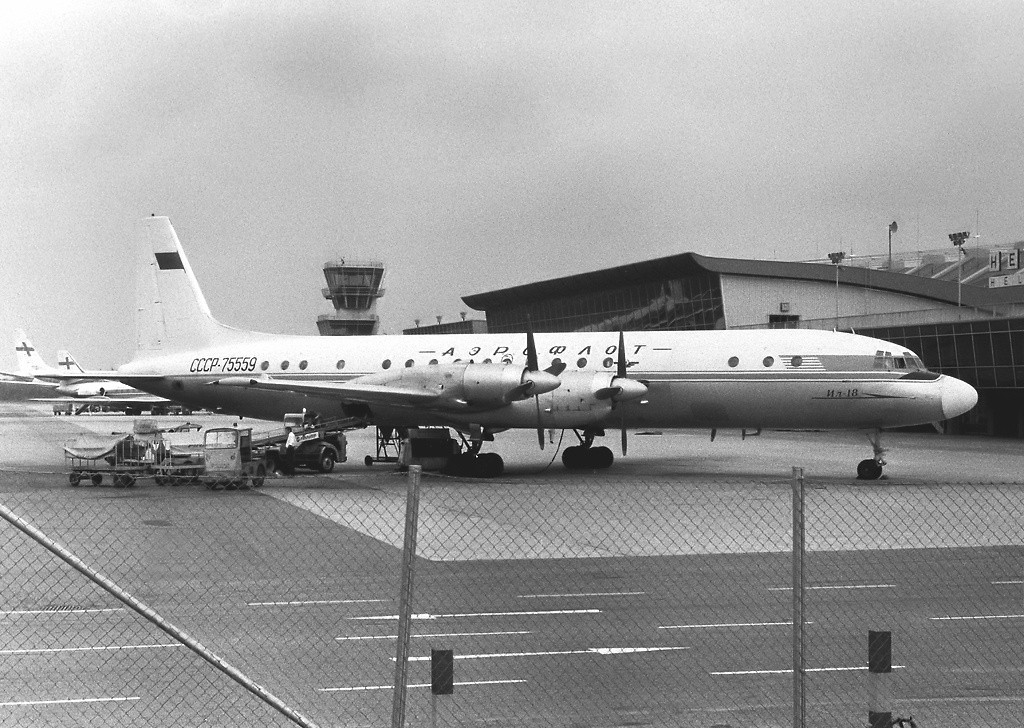
- Another Il-18V, which also crashed near Leningrad in 1974

Occurrence
- Date: 31 December 1970
- Summary: Loss of control after takeoff due to improper aircraft configuration (flaps retracted, control locks/ignition engaged; reduced thrust from anti-ice off)
- Site: Pulkovo Airport, Leningrad, Soviet Union

Aircraft
- Aircraft type: Ilyushin Il-18V
- Operator: Aeroflot
- Registration: CCCP-75773
- Flight origin: Pulkovo Airport, Leningrad
- Destination: Yerevan Airport
- Occupants: 86
- Passengers: 78
- Crew: 8
- Fatalities: 6
- Injuries: 26
- Survivors: 80

Aeroflot Flight 3012 was a domestic Aeroflot scheduled flight from Leningrad to Yerevan by an Ilyushin Il-18 that, on 31 December 1970, crashed during takeoff.

Attempts were made to hush up the crash, but a week after the event it was reported via westen airlines who had heard of it from Aeroflot personnel. Early reports stated all 88 people on board were killed. The Russian investigation states six of the 86 people on board were killed.

== Aircraft and occupants ==
The aircraft was an approximately nine-year-old Ilyushin Il-18V (registration CCCP-75773, construction number 182004505) equipped with four Ivchenko AI-20 engines.

== Accident ==
The Il-18 climbed unusually steeply and began rolling from side to side, maintaining an altitude of 30–50 m for the first 2,500 m of flight. It then banked to the right and began losing altitude. The aircraft then struck a snow-covered field with its tail. The aircraft which was flying at a critical angle of attack, impacted nose-first and slid another 210 m.

== Aftermath ==
The accident was not covered by Russian media. On 6 January, Western airlines in Moscow announced the crash. Sources of Aeroflot only learned of the crash on 8 January. According to UPI, aircraft crashes were always kept secret unless there were foreigners on board the flights. In the earliest reports of the accident on 6 January, six days after the accident, it was reported at least two people died; the pilot and copilot. A few days later it was reported the crash killed all 88 people on board. The Aviation Safety Network states that 6 of the 86 people on board were killed.

== Cause ==
An investigation found that the flight crew forgot to select the flaps prior to takeoff due to a hurried takeoff.
