= Sanino =

Sanino Санино
- Village
- Location within Vladimir Oblast Location within Russia
- Coordinates: 55°59′N 38°55′E
- Country: Russia
- Region: Vladimir Oblast
- District: Petushinsky District
- Time zone: UTC+3:00

Sanino (Russian: Санино) is a rural locality (a village) in Nagornoye Rural Settlement, Petushinsky District, Vladimir Oblast, Russia. The population was 155 as of 2010. There are 11 streets.

== Geography ==
Sanino is located 44 km northwest of Petushki (the district's administrative centre) by road. Saninskogo DOKa is the nearest rural locality.
