= Kondinsky =

Kondinsky (Russian: Кондинский; masculine), Kondinskaya (Кондинская; feminine), or Kondinskoye (Кондинское; neuter) is the name of several inhabited localities (urban-type settlements and selos) in Russia.

Urban localities

- Kondinskoye, Khanty-Mansi Autonomous Okrug, an urban-type settlement in Kondinsky District of Khanty-Mansi Autonomous Okrug

Rural localities

- Kondinskoye, Kurgan Oblast, a selo in Kondinsky Selsoviet of Shatrovsky District of Kurgan Oblast
