= Aeroflot Flight A-13 =

1973 Antonov An-24 crash in Baku

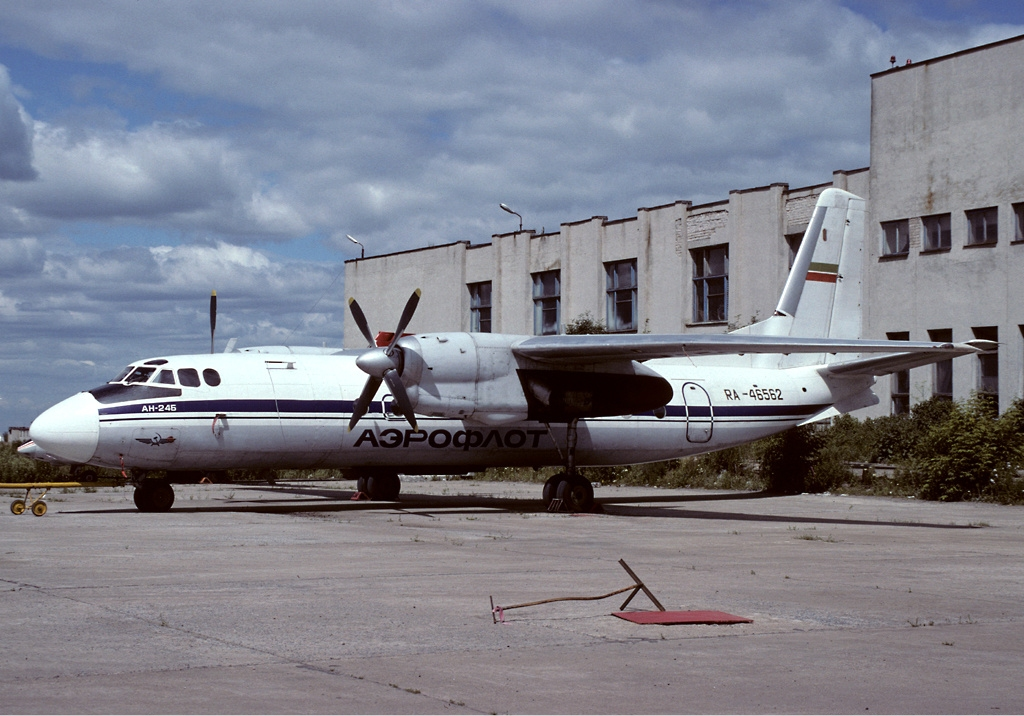
- An Aeroflot Antonov An-24B, similar to the one involved in the accident

Accident
- Date: 18 August 1973
- Summary: Struck a cable at low altitude after suffering an uncontained engine failure
- Site: Near Baku-Bina International Airport, Baku, Azerbaijan; 40°19′48.6″N 50°34′08.6″E

Aircraft
- Aircraft type: Antonov An-24B
- Operator: Aeroflot
- Registration: CCCP-46435
- Flight origin: Baku-Bina International Airport, Baku, Azerbaijan
- Destination: Fort-Shevchenko Airport, Kazakh SSR
- Passengers: 60
- Crew: 4
- Fatalities: 56
- Injuries: 8
- Survivors: 8

Aeroflot Flight A-13 (Russian: Рейс A-13 Аэрофлота Reys A-13 Aeroflota) was a scheduled Soviet domestic passenger flight from Baku, Azerbaijan to Fort-Shevchenko in Kazakhstan that crashed on 18 August 1973 shortly after takeoff, killing 56 of the 64 passengers and crew aboard. The Antonov An-24 had suffered an engine failure on takeoff and was attempting to return to the airport when it struck an oil rig cable at low altitude resulting in a crash. At the time, it was the second deadliest accident involving the An-24 and remains the second deadliest aviation accident in Azerbaijani history. The engine failure had been caused by the effect of continuous overheating on the performance of the blades.

== Aircraft ==
The aircraft involved in the accident was an Antonov An-24B registered CCCP-46435 to Aeroflot. The Antonov An-24 is a twin engine medium haul transport/passenger aircraft that was introduced in 1962. The 'B' variant of the model increased passenger capacity and modified the flaps to increase performance. CCCP-46435 entered service in 1968 and was operating under the Azerbaijan Civil Aviation Administration. At the time of the accident, the aircraft had sustained 7,374 flight hours and 5,502 pressurization cycles.

== Crew ==
The cockpit crew consisted of:

- Captain: Nikolai Panchenko
- Co-pilot: Valentin Viktorovich Konokotin
- Flight engineer: Anatoly Vasilyevich Zharov

Tamara Kazimagomedova served as flight attendant.

== Accident ==
At 18:36 MSK on 18 August 1973, CCCP-46435 took off from Baku-Bina International Airport for an approximately 300 miles (480 km) flight to the Kazakh town of Fort-Shevchenko. Weather at the time was fair with ten kilometers of visibility, and wind coming from the north. On board were sixty passengers, including eleven children, and four crew who were on their second flight of the day. Just 30 feet (9.1 m) above the runway, the An-24 suffered an uncontained failure of the left engine. At 90 feet (27 m) the crew retracted the flaps and began turning left at an altitude of 120 feet (37 m). As it turned, the left wingtip struck the cable of an oil rig in the Caspian Sea, shearing it off. The plane descended, striking a pipeline, before crashing near a highway at 18:51 MSK. 54 people on board were killed and eight others seriously injured including the flight's captain and flight engineer.

== Conclusions ==
An investigation of the crash blamed the engine failure on the degradation of the turbine blades in the engine as a result of continuous overheating. This overheating can stem from several causes including not following the correct start-up procedures, design flaws, and the inability to detect overheating by neither visual means nor instrument indications. The plane was also overloaded beyond its weight capacity by 193 kilograms (425 pounds).

== See also ==
- Azerbaijan Airlines Flight 217
- Azerbaijan Airlines Flight A-56
- Aeroflot Flight 3843
- Avensa Flight 358
