= Aeroflot Flight 6263 =

1973 aviation accident in the Soviet Union

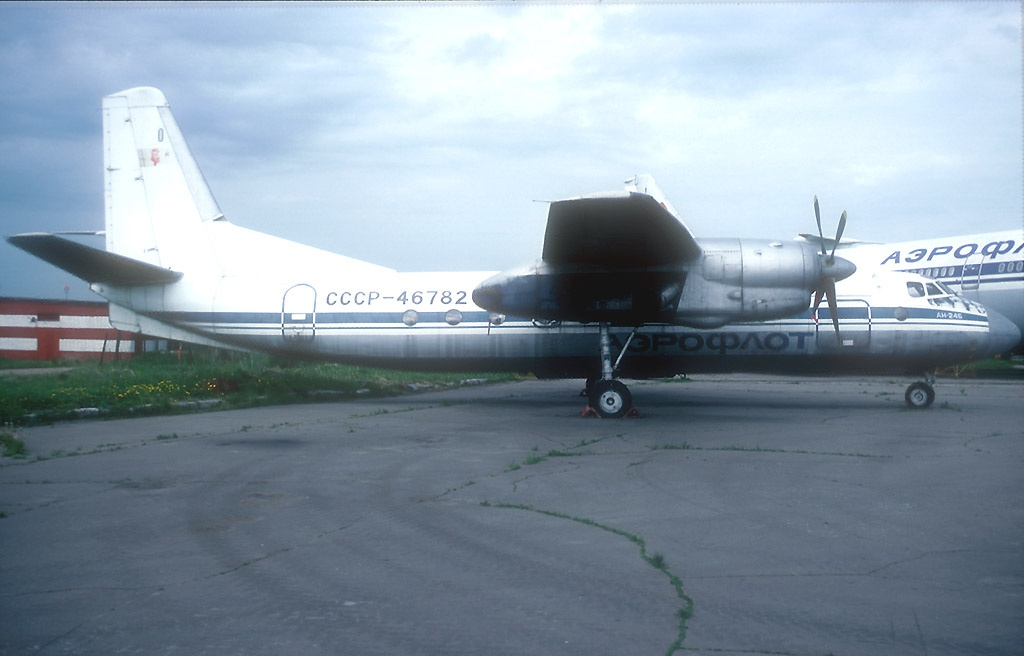
- An Antonov An-24 similar to the aircraft involved in the accident

Accident
- Date: 21 January 1973
- Summary: Loss of control, in-flight breakup for reasons unknown (official); Accidental shootdown by missile (unofficial)
- Site: Bolshesosnovsky District, Russian SFSR, Soviet Union (now in Perm Krai, Russia)

Aircraft
- Aircraft type: Antonov An-24B
- Operator: Aeroflot
- Registration: CCCP-46276
- Flight origin: Krasnodar International Airport
- 1st stopover: Volgograd International Airport
- 2nd stopover: Saratov Tsentralny Airport
- 3rd stopover: Kazan International Airport
- Destination: Perm International Airport
- Occupants: 39
- Passengers: 34
- Crew: 5
- Fatalities: 39(originally 35)
- Survivors: 0(originally 4)

Aeroflot Flight 6263 was a scheduled domestic passenger flight from Krasnodar International Airport to Perm International Airport, with stopovers in Volgograd, Saratov, and Kazan. Shortly before the flight was scheduled to land in Perm on 21 January 1973, the aircraft entered a downward spiral and crashed in Bolshesosnovsky District approximately 91 km (57 mi; 49 nmi) from Perm International Airport, its intended destination. Of the 39 passengers and crew on board the aircraft, four survived the initial crash; however, all survivors had died by the time rescuers arrived at the scene.

== Aircraft ==
The aircraft involved in the accident was an Antonov An-24B with registration CCCP-46276. The aircraft first flew in 1967.

== Accident ==
Approximately 15 minutes before the aircraft was due to land in Perm, at an altitude of 5,400 metres (17,700 ft), the aircraft entered a downward spiral, reaching approximately 1,000 kilometres per hour (620 mph; 540 kn). The aircraft subsequently broke up due to high g-forces at an altitude of approximately 2,700 metres (8,900 ft). The fuselage came to rest in an inverted position on deep snow in Bolshesosnovsky District, approximately 91 km (57 mi; 49 nmi) from Perm. Four of the 39 passengers and crew on board initially survived the crash; however, all of the initial survivors had died of exposure to the cold by the time rescuers arrived at the scene.

Investigators were unable to conclusively determine the cause of the crash. Some signs of a missile explosion were found, such as dots of green paint that were not from the aircraft. However, the Ministry of Defence denied that there had been any exercises in the area at the time of the crash.
