= Rzhevka Airport =

Airport in Saint Petersburg, Russia

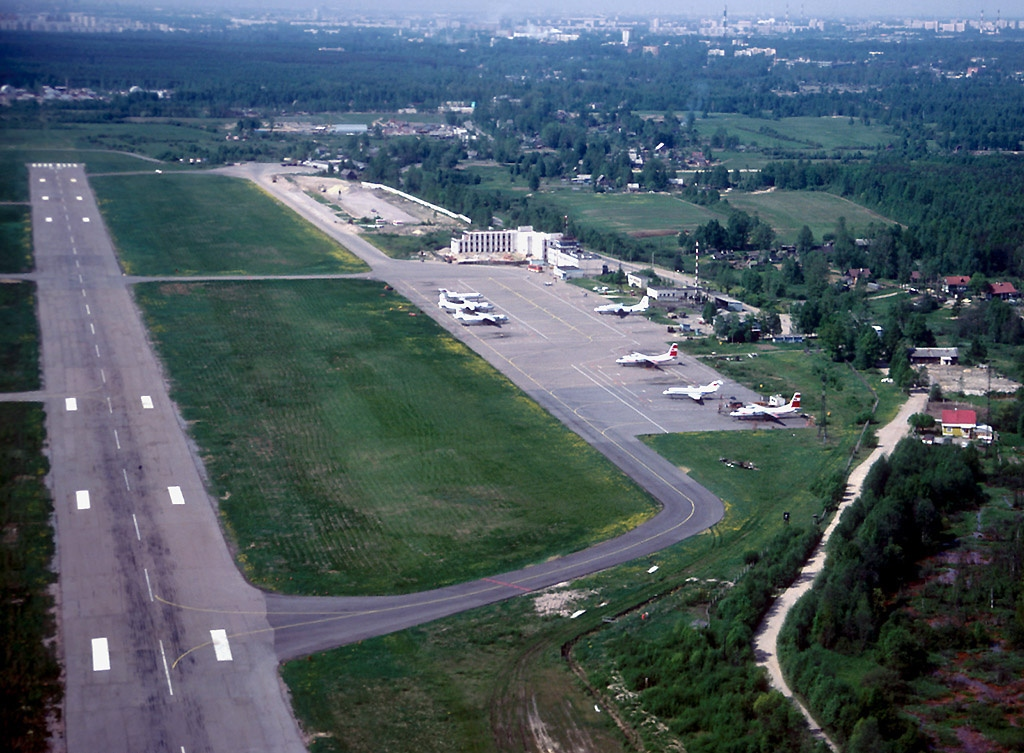
- IATA: RVH; ICAO: ULSS

Summary
- Airport type: Public
- Location: Saint Petersburg
- Elevation AMSL: 62 ft (19 m)
- Coordinates: 59°58′48″N 30°35′18″E
- Interactive map of Rzhevka Airport

Runways
Direction	Length		Surface
Direction	ft	m	Surface
06/24	5,905	1,800	Asphalt

Rzhevka Airport (Russian: Аэропорт Ржевка) (IATA: RVH, ICAO: ULSS) is an airport in Leningrad Oblast, Russia located 15 km east of Saint Petersburg. Now the airport serves small aircraft.

The airport was officially closed in 2007 and its runways are currently used as dealer car parking. A Soviet-made Il-14 and a few smaller aircraft have been abandoned on the apron since then but the airport was restored in 2015 .

== See also ==
- List of airports in Russia
