= Aeroflot accidents and incidents in the 1980s =

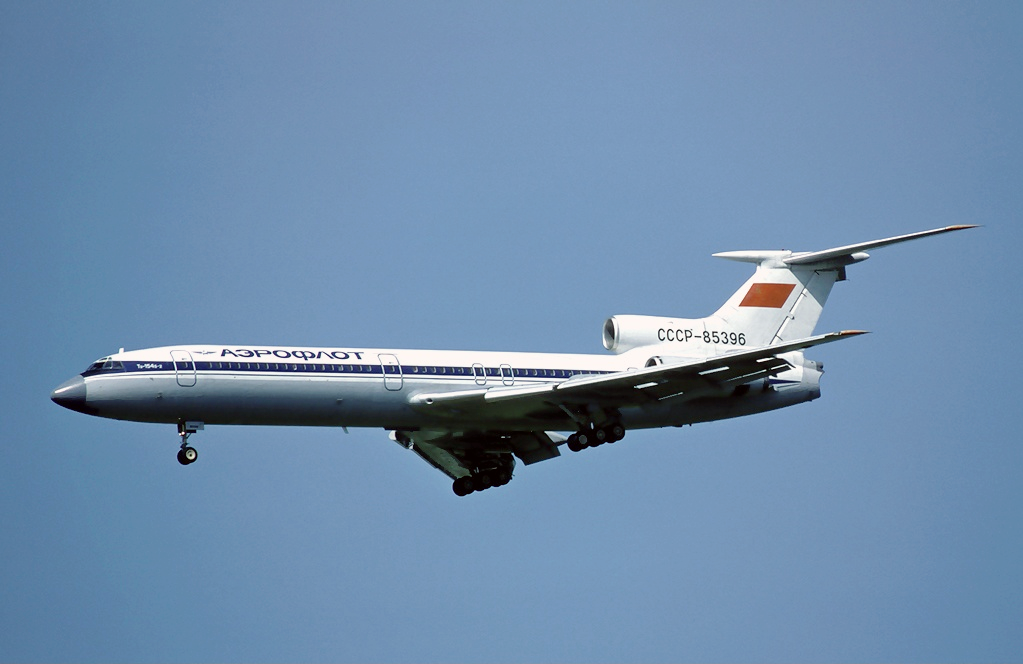
A Tupolev Tu-154B-2 similar to the one involved in the crash of Flight 5143, occurred on 10 July 1985, is seen here on approach to Zurich Airport in 1982.

The following is a list of accidents and incidents experienced by Aeroflot during the 1980s. The deadliest accident the carrier experienced in this decade occurred in July 1985, when Flight 5143, a Tupolev Tu-154B-2, stalled en route and crashed near Uchkuduk, then located in the Uzbek SSR, claiming the lives of all 200 occupants aboard the aircraft. The second deadliest accident the company went through in the decade took place in October 1984, when Flight 3352, a Tupolev Tu-154B-1, hit snowploughs upon landing at Omsk Airport, killing 174 of 179 people on board plus four people on the ground. Both accidents combined left a death toll of 378 casualties and involved a Tupolev Tu-154, ranking as the worst ones involving the type, as of February 2012.

There were 15 deadly accidents involving more than 50 people killed during this decade. The total number of fatalities for the decade rose to 2,056. When these figures are compared with the ones for the previous decade, the number of people killed aboard Aeroflot aircraft reduced by 1400. Given that most of the events took place within the borders of the Soviet Union, the table below includes hull-loss accidents for which the number of casualties was not published, a common practice during the Soviet era, as only those accidents that took place within the Soviet Union in which there were foreigners involved, or those that occurred outside the country tended to be published or admitted. Given this, the figures for the number of fatalities for the decade might be higher.

During the decade, the airline lost 201 aircraft, split into 1 Avia 14, 8 Antonov An-12s, 93 Antonov An-2s, 10 Antonov An-24s, 8 Antonov An-26s, 1 Antonov An-28, 7 Ilyushin Il-14s, 2 Ilyushin Il-62s, 1 Ilyushin Il-76, 19 Let L-410s, 15 Tupolev Tu-134s, 14 Tupolev Tu-154s, 19 Yakovlev Yak-40s and 2 Yakovlev Yak-42s.

== List ==
Date	Location	Aircraft	Tail number	Airline division	Aircraft damage	Fatalities	Description	Refs
1 March 1980	(Soviet Union) Orenburg	Tu-154A	CCCP-85103	West Siberia	W/O	0/161	Hard landing at Orenburg Airport. On approach, the aircraft descended below the glide scope and the crew failed to go-around. It struck the ground short of the runway, bounced, touched down again and broke in two. Due to complete the second leg of a Simferopol–Sochi–Orenburg–Novosibirsk passenger service as Flight 3324.	
3 April 1980	(Soviet Union) Aldan Airport	An-2	CCCP-16027	Yakut	W/O	0	Force-landed in a forest after the engine lost power.	
13 April 1980	(Soviet Union) Kara Sea	An-2T	CCCP-62479	Yakut	W/O	Unknown	Both the fuselage and the wings sustained damage by the wheel studs when the aircraft performed a hard landing on its skis.	
14 April 1980	(Soviet Union) Krasnoyarsk	An-24B	CCCP-47732	Krasnoyarsk	W/O	2/50	Crashed while making a forced landing attempt, following the fracture of the starboard main undercarriage unit shortly after takeoff from Krasnoyarsk Airport. The aircraft was operating a domestic scheduled Krasnoyarsk–Yeniseisk passenger service as Flight 151.	
18 April 1980	(Soviet Union) Bykovo Airport	An-24B	CCCP-46220	Central	W/O	0/47	Crashed on takeoff. The aircraft failed to gain altitude on takeoff, after which it struck a concrete wall, crossed a highway and crashed into buildings and caught fire. The crew had not selected flaps for takeoff. Due to operate a domestic scheduled Moscow–Ulyanovsk passenger service.	
12 June 1980	(Soviet Union) Off Dushanbe	Yak-40	CCCP-87689	Tajikistan	W/O	29/29	The aircraft was operating a domestic scheduled Leninabad–Dushanbe passenger service as Flight Sh-88 when it went off course and crashed into the slope of a mountain 44 kilometres (27 mi) northwest of Dushanbe Airport.	
8 July 1980	(Soviet Union) Alma-Ata	Tu-154B-2	CCCP-85355	Kazakhstan	W/O	163/163	Crashed shortly after takeoff from Alma-Ata Airport when the airspeed suddenly dropped because of thermal currents it encountered during climbout. The airplane stalled, crashed, and caught fire. Was due to operate a domestic scheduled Alma-Ata–Simferopol passenger service as Flight 4225.	
18 July 1980	(Soviet Union) Talaghy Airport	Yak-40	CCCP-87793	Arkhangelsk	W/O	0/27	While on approach to Arkhangelsk, the flight engineer shut down the engines by mistake. The engines could not be restarted because the aircraft was flying too low. An emergency landing was made on a highway near the airport, but after landing the right wing struck a power pylon and ended up in a ditch. The aircraft was completing a Kotlas–Arkhangelsk passenger service.	
15 September 1980	(Soviet Union) Bereznik	Il-14P	CCCP-41831	Arkhangelsk	W/O	0/20	Crash-landed following asymmetric power on approach to Bereznik Airport.	
8 October 1980	(Soviet Union) Chita	Tu-154B-2	CCCP-85321	Far East	W/O	0/184	Inbound from Barnaul, the aircraft approached to Chita Airport well above the glideslope. Despite the flightcrew performing a steep descent, the aircraft made a long landing. The tail broke off as a consequence of the dive maneuver, and the landing gear sustained damage as well.	
28 October 1980	(Afghanistan) Kabul	An-12B	CCCP-11104	International	W/O	6/6	Was operating the last leg of an international scheduled Sofia–Mineralnye Vody–Tashkent–Kabul passenger service as Flight 1531, when it crashed into mountainous terrain, after the flightcrew descended below the minimum safe altitude, in bad weather, on approach to Kabul Airport.	
6 January 1981	(Soviet Union) Sochi	Tu-134A	CCCP-65698	Latvia	W/O	0	Brake failure on landing at Sochi Airport.	
12 February 1981	(Soviet Union) Krenkel Station	Il-14T	CCCP-04188	Central	W/O	2/13	While on final approach the crew twice lost sight of the runway lights. The aircraft touched down next to the runway in deep snow, collapsing the nose gear. The nose section struck the ground, causing a fuel tank and cargo to break loose. Due to complete a domestic non-scheduled Myachkovo–Sredny Peninsula–Krenkel Station passenger service. The wrecked aircraft still remains at the crash site.	
18 February 1981	Unknown	L-410M	CCCP-67273	Yakut	W/O	Unknown	Destroyed by a fire that broke out on the flight deck.	
28 April 1981	(Soviet Union) Lazo	An-2TP	CCCP-92864	Yakut	W/O	12/12	Started to descend after encountering snow squall lines on its flight path at 1,500 metres (4,900 ft), while en route from Batagay to Lazo. During the descent the aircraft struck a mountain.	
3 May 1981	(Soviet Union) Voskhod	An-2R	CCCP-70836	Azerbaijan	W/O	2/3	While crop-spraying for the "Runo" state farm, the pilot lost control in a steep turn at 20–25 m (66–82 ft) during an unauthorized flight. The aircraft crashed in a forest belt. There were two passengers on board and the pilot was inexperienced in agricultural operations and also had lacked the permits for crop-spraying flights.	
21 May 1981	Unknown	An-2	CCCP-35198	Yakut	W/O	Unknown	Crashed into a forest.	
7 June 1981	(Soviet Union) Voroshilovgrad Region	An-2R	CCCP-02357	Ukraine	W/O	0	Crashed during an unauthorized flight.	
13 June 1981	(Soviet Union) Bratsk	Tu-154	CCCP-85029	Moscow	W/O	0	Overran the runway on landing at Bratsk Airport.	
13 June 1981	(Soviet Union) Saldus	An-2R	CCCP-07712	Latvia	W/O	2/2	Hit an oil storage tank following loss of altitude due to an engine failure, crashing and burning.	
14 June 1981	(Soviet Union) Ust-Barguzin	Il-14M	CCCP-41838	East Siberia	W/O	48/48	The aircraft was operating a domestic scheduled Ulan-Ude–Severomuysk passenger service as Flight 498. The planned course was abandoned due to bad weather, and the crew headed the airplane towards Ust-Barguzin. It crashed into mountainous terrain, 30 kilometres (19 mi) southwest of the new destination. This crash is the worst ever accident involving the Il-14.	
28 June 1981	(Soviet Union) Simferopol	Tu-134A	CCCP-65871	Ukraine	W/O	0	Experienced a burst tyre upon landing at Simferopol Airport, inbound from Kiev; the debris punctured a fuel tank, starting a fire.	
15 July 1981	(Soviet Union) Bodaybo	An-2T	CCCP-01883	East Siberia	W/O	0/2	The aircraft was on a positioning flight from Bodaybo to Kedrovy when it came in too fast due to a tail wind, overran and struck an earthen wall and caught fire.	
30 July 1981	(Soviet Union) Chimkent region	An-2R	CCCP-07422	Kazakhstan	W/O	0	The pilot unintentionally shut down the engine during takeoff and a forced landing was carried out.	
1 August 1981	(Soviet Union) Ostrov Utichiy	Il-14M	CCCP-91517	Magadan	W/O	11/11	Crashed into the terrain in poor visibility conditions while en route on a Magadan–Komsomolsk-on-Amur flight.	
24 August 1981	(Soviet Union) Off Zavitinsk	An-24RV	CCCP-46653	Far East	W/O	37	Was involved in a mid-air collision with a Soviet Air Force Tupolev Tu-16K. The commercial airliner was operating a domestic scheduled Komsomolsk-on-Amur–Blagoveshchensk passenger service as Flight 811 with 27 passengers and a crew of 5 aboard, when it collided with the military aircraft, that had 6 occupants on board, at an altitude of 17,000 feet (5,200 m), approximately 70 kilometres (43 mi) east of Zavitinsk. A single occupant of the An-24 survived the accident.	
29 August 1981	(Soviet Union) Zeya	Yak-40	CCCP-87346	Far East	W/O	3/34	Hit tree tops when it descended below the glideslope on approach to Zeya Airport amid poor weather, crashing, and catching fire. The aircraft was operating a domestic scheduled Irkutsk–Chita–Zeya–Blagoveshchensk passenger service as Flight 674.	
8 September 1981	(Soviet Union) Tashkent Airport	Tu-154B-2	CCCP-85448	Ural	W/O	0	Burned out during refueling.	
9 September 1981	(Soviet Union) Namangan Region	An-2R	CCCP-07601	Privolzhsk	W/O	0	The engine failed while crop-spraying and a forced landing was carried out.	
13 September 1981	(Soviet Union) Saratov	An-2R	CCCP-32475	Privolzhsk	W/O	0	Landed on unsuitable terrain.	
16 September 1981	(Soviet Union) Bulunsky District	An-2TP	CCCP-40523	Yakut	W/O	0/2	Landed on soft terrain and sank, breaking off the engine.	
18 September 1981	(Soviet Union) Zheleznogorsk-Ilimsky	Yak-40	CCCP-87455	East Siberia	W/O	40	The airplane was operating a domestic scheduled Irkutsk–Zheleznogorsk-Ilimsky passenger service as Flight V-652 with 33 occupants on board, when it collided in clouds, 11 kilometres (6.8 mi) away from its destination, with a Mi-8 (CCCP-22268) that had 7 people aboard. All occupants from both aircraft perished in the accident. Cause attributed to ATC errors.	
16 November 1981	(Soviet Union) Norilsk	Tu-154B-2	CCCP-85480	Krasnoyarsk	W/O	99/167	Acquired excessive vertical speed and descended below the glideslope on approach to Norilsk Airport, inbound from Krasnoyarsk, crashing some 500 metres (1,600 ft) ahead of the runway. The aircraft was operating a domestic scheduled passenger service as Flight 3603.	
26 November 1981	(Soviet Union) Ust-Kulom	An-2P	CCCP-01808	Komi	W/O	15/15	The aircraft were involved in a mid-air collision. The An-2P was operating a domestic scheduled Ust-Kulom–Syktyvkar passenger service with 12 passengers and 6 crewmembers on board, while the An-2TP was flying the opposite route as Flight I-210. The airplanes collided at an altitude of 200 metres (660 ft) in a cloudy environment, 12 kilometres (7.5 mi) off Ust-Kulom. The first aircraft crashed into a wooden area, killing all occupants aboard; CCCP-40564 landed safely, only sustaining minor damage to one of its wings.	
26 November 1981	(Soviet Union) Ust-Kulom	An-2TP	CCCP-40564	Komi	Repaired	0/15		
6 December 1981	(Soviet Union) Sheremetyevo Airport	Il-62M	CCCP-86508	International	W/O	0	Caught fire due to a short circuit in the electrical system and burned out while parked.	
18 December 1981	(Soviet Union) Deputatskiy	An-2TP	CCCP-92858	Magadan	W/O	0	Having departed from Chokurdah Airport, the crew lost their way as they flew the wrong heading in bad weather. The aircraft eventually ran out of fuel and force-landed 13 kilometres (8.1 mi) from Deputatskiy.	
23 December 1981	(Soviet Union) Yeniseysk	An-26	CCCP-26505	Krasnoyarsk	W/O	2	Crashed short of the runway on approach to Yeniseysk Airport.	
7 January 1982	(Soviet Union) Gelendzhik	L-410M	CCCP-67290	Georgia	W/O	18/18	Weather at the time of takeoff was poor, with rain and a low ceiling. Four minutes after takeoff, the pilot radioed that he was leaving the airport area and that he was 12 km (7.5 mi) from the airport, flying at 450 m (1,480 ft). Six minutes later, while flying in cloud, the aircraft struck trees and crashed. The pilot was flying VFR in bad weather and failed to consider the winds, which had caused the aircraft to drift 3.7 km (2.3 mi) off course. The aircraft was operating a Gelendzhik-Sukhumi passenger service as Flight G-96.	
16 January 1982	(Soviet Union) Shevchenko	Yak-40	CCCP-87902	Kazakhstan	W/O	0/3	Belly-landed following fuel exhaustion.	
10 February 1982	(Soviet Union) Yakutsk	L-410M	CCCP-67237	Yakut	W/O	0/0	While standing on the apron, probably at Yakutsk Airport, an An-2 that was carrying out an engine test ran into it.	
11 April 1982	Unknown	An-2T	CCCP-62489	Yakut	W/O	Unknown	Sank when the frozen lake it was standing on broke.	
24 April 1982	(Soviet Union) Novy Urengoy	An-12B	CCCP-11107	International	W/O	0/7	Experienced the collapse of the nosegear during the take-off run at Novy Urengoy Airport, running off the runway and hitting an elevated taxiway. The main landing gear was sheared off during the incident, rupturing the fuel tanks, and causing a fire to break out.	
7 May 1982	(Soviet Union) Tashtagol	An-2	CCCP-02183	West Siberia	W/O	5/5	The aircraft encountered poor weather during the last leg of a domestic scheduled Kemerovo–Novokutnetsk–Tashtagol passenger service as Flight 6758. The aircraft deviated 8 km (5.0 mi) to the left of the flight route and struck the side of Mount Pustag at 1,050 m (3,440 ft).	
11 May 1982	(East Germany) Sputendorf	An-2R	CCCP-07399	Ukraine	W/O	0	Crashed due to engine failure.	
31 May 1982	(Soviet Union) Dnepropetrovsk	Yak-40	CCCP-87485	North Caucasus	W/O	0/35	Overran the runway at Dnepropetrovsk Airport.	
3 June 1982	(Soviet Union) Polevoye	An-2R	CCCP-40736	Far East	W/O	0	Crashed during an unauthorized flight.	
4 June 1982	(Soviet Union) Dvoinovski	An-2R	CCCP-62640	Lithuania	W/O	0	Crashed while crop-spraying.	
11 June 1982	(Soviet Union) Krasnoarmeiskaya	An-2R	CCCP-56431	North Caucasus	W/O	0	Collided with a fuel truck during taxi.	
28 June 1982	(Soviet Union) Mozyr	Yak-42	CCCP-42529	Leningrad	W/O	132/132	Crashed near Mozyr while en route, following the failure of the horizontal stabiliser jackscrew due to metal fatigue. The aircraft was operating a Leningrad–Kiev passenger service as Flight 8641.	
6 July 1982	(Soviet Union) Moscow	Il-62M	CCCP-86513	International	W/O	90/90	An apparent failure of both port engines arose moments after the aircraft got airborne, as indicated by the fire alarms in the cockpit. Both engines were shut down. Despite the crew's attempts to maintain altitude, the aircraft lost height and crashed 11.4 kilometres (7.1 mi) north of Sheremetyevo Airport. The airplane was due to operate an international scheduled Moscow–Dakar passenger service as Flight 411. It was later revealed that the fire alarms were false.	
16 July 1982	(Soviet Union) Sakha Republic	An-2	CCCP-15970	Yakut	W/O	0/3	During a flight from Lake Bolshoye Toko to Uchur, the pilot performed an unauthorized landing on a spit in the Aldoma River (90 km (56 mi) north of Lake Bolshoye Toko) to drop off two passengers. The aircraft failed to gain altitude during takeoff and the landing wheels touched the water. The aircraft crashed upside down in the river.	
14 August 1982	(Soviet Union) Sukhumi	Tu-134A	CCCP-65836	Georgia	W/O	0/82	Both aircraft were involved in a runway collision at Dranda Airport, when the outbound Tu-134 struck the L-410M that had just entered the active runway with 11 people aboard. All occupants of this latter aircraft perished in the accident. The Tu-134 was beginning a Sukhumi-Moscow service as Flight 974 and the Yak-40 was beginning a Sukhumi-Kutaisi service as Flight G-73.	
14 August 1982	(Soviet Union) Sukhumi	L-410M	CCCP-67191	Georgia	W/O	11/11	Both aircraft were involved in a runway collision at Dranda Airport, when the outbound Tu-134 struck the L-410M that had just entered the active runway with 11 people aboard. All occupants of this latter aircraft perished in the accident. The Tu-134 was beginning a Sukhumi-Moscow service as Flight 974 and the Yak-40 was beginning a Sukhumi-Kutaisi service as Flight G-73.	
19 August 1982	(Soviet Union) Dno	An-2R	CCCP-70446	Leningrad	W/O	0	Crashed into terrain during a low-altitude flight in poor weather.	
9 September 1982	(Soviet Union) Khorezm	An-2R	CCCP-62663	Ukraine	W/O	0/2	Forced landed in the Khorezm region following a loss of power, colliding with an embankment, breaking up, and catching fire. The aircraft was carrying out a crop spraying mission.	
9 September 1982	(Soviet Union) Imishli	An-2R	CCCP-70563	Azerbaijan	W/O	0	The engine failed while crop-spraying and a forced landing was carried out.	
28 September 1982	(Soviet Union) Chimkent Region	An-2R	CCCP-44628	Kazakhstan	W/O	0	Overran the runway on landing.	
29 September 1982	Luxembourg	Il-62M	CCCP-86470	International	W/O	7/77 (Note: Figures for the actual number of occupants differ by one passenger; there is also a discrepancy over the date of occurrence by one day.)	Experienced a failure in one of the thrust reversers moments prior to touchdown at Findel Airport, causing the aircraft to yaw to the right, running off the runway, striking a building, sliding down a ravine, and eventually coming to rest 2,200 metres (7,200 ft) past the runway threshold. The aircraft was operating an international scheduled Moscow–Luxembourg–Havana–Lima passenger service as Flight 343.	
18 November 1982	(Soviet Union) Dnepropetrovsk Region	An-2R	CCCP-54883	Ukraine	W/O	0	Unknown	
16 December 1982	(Soviet Union) Sakhanskiy	An-24B	CCCP-46567	Central	W/O	0/27	Fifty-two minutes after takeoff from Kiev, while flying at 5,100 m (16,700 ft), wiring in the cockpit started a fire, filling the cockpit with smoke. The crew began descending, and attempted but failed to extinguish the fire. A cockpit hatch was opened but the crew still found it difficult to read the instruments. A wheels-up landing in a field was performed about eight minutes after the fire started; the aircraft burned out after landing. The aircraft was operating a domestic scheduled Kursk–Kiev–Odessa passenger service as Flight 395.	
23 December 1982	(Soviet Union) Rostov-on-Don	An-26	CCCP-26627	Turkmenistan	W/O	16/16	The aircraft was operating a Sukhumi–Rostov-on-Don–Krasnovodsk cargo service. It crashed and was destroyed by fire shortly after takeoff from Rostov-on-Don Airport, after it hit trees during initial climbout. The airplane was overloaded.	
7 February 1983	(Soviet Union) Preobrazhenskaya District	An-2TP	CCCP-32320	North Caucasus	W/O	0	Crashed after encountering poor weather.	
23 February 1983	(Soviet Union) Cherkasy Region	An-2R	CCCP-84571	Ukraine	W/O	0	Crashed. The copilot was at the controls while the pilot was in the cargo hold.	
29 March 1983	(Soviet Union) Poti	L-410M	CCCP-67190	Georgia	W/O	6/18	Had a failure in one of its engines immediately after take-off from Poti Airport, and the propeller could not be feathered. Despite an attempted forced landing, the aircraft crashed into a hillside. Due to operate a domestic scheduled Poti–Sukhumi passenger service as Flight G-70.	
12 April 1983	(Soviet Union) Minsk-1 Airport	An-26	CCCP-26686	Belarus	W/O	0/5	During the approach to Minsk, the aircraft came in too high and too fast. The pilot continued the approach and the aircraft landed hard, bouncing three times and suffering severe damage. The center of gravity was too far to the rear. The aircraft was completing a Riga–Minsk cargo service.	
19 April 1983	(Soviet Union) Leninakan	Yak-40	CCCP-87291	Armenia	W/O	21/21	Went off course while en route from Nalchik to Leninakan as Flight E-46'. It crashed into a mountain, 41 kilometres (25 mi) away from Leninakan Airport, after it was cleared to descend.	
30 April 1983	(Soviet Union) Cesis	An-2R	CCCP-62646	Latvia	W/O	0	Crashed after hitting a high-voltage power line.	
4 May 1983	(Soviet Union) Kaunas	An-2R	CCCP-35637	Lithuania	W/O	0	Written off following an in-flight fire in the cabin.	
9 May 1983	(Soviet Union) Tavil-Dara	An-2TP	CCCP-02515	Tajikistan	W/O	0	Force-landed following engine failure.	
11 May 1983	(Soviet Union) Blagodarnoye	An-2R	CCCP-70057	Kazakhstan	W/O	0	Suffered a bird strike, causing the engine to quit as the bird clogged the air intake. A forced landing was carried out.	
15 May 1983	(Soviet Union) Kubitet	An-2R	CCCP-02877	West Siberia	W/O	0	Struck trees and crashed while crop-spraying.	
25 May 1983	(Soviet Union) Shiyaiski	An-2R	CCCP-62626	North Caucasus	W/O	0	Struck a high-voltage power line and crashed while crop-spraying.	
17 June 1983	(Soviet Union) Gali	Tu-134A	CCCP-65657	Armenia	W/O	0	Entered a zone of severe turbulence while en route from Lvov to Yerevan, approximately over Gali. The aircraft landed safely, though it was written off following the excessive stresses it underwent. The aircraft was used for fire tests at Yerevan in 1986 during the investigation of Flight 2306.	
29 June 1983	(Soviet Union) Kazarman	Yak-40	CCCP-87808	Kyrgyzstan	W/O	0/9	While flying near Kazarman at 7,200 m (23,600 ft) the aircraft entered a downdraft and lost 2,000 m (6,600 ft) and suffered a load of 5.5 g. The crew regained control and made an emergency landing at Osh. The aircraft suffered severe damage during the descent and it was written off.	
4 July 1983	(Soviet Union) Mestia	An-2T	CCCP-05667	Georgia	W/O	0	The aircraft entered severe turbulence. The crew were unable to maintain control and the aircraft crashed.	
5 July 1983	(Soviet Union) Pulkovo Airport	Tu-134	Unknown	Unknown	Unknown	1	The aircraft, probably a Tupolev Tu-134, was hijacked en route to Tallinn by two men. One hijacker told a flight attendant that there was a bomb on board and that the other hijacker would detonate it if they were not flown to Oslo or London. They agreed on a fuel stop at Kotka, Finland but the aircraft landed at Leningrad instead. The hijackers realized that they had been tricked and one shouted to the other to blow up the aircraft. Security forces boarded the aircraft and killed one hijacker and arrested the other.	
20 July 1983	(Soviet Union) Kharkov Region	An-2R	CCCP-70520	Ukraine	W/O	0	Unknown	
5 August 1983	(Soviet Union) Koslan	An-2TP	CCCP-91768	Komi	W/O	Unknown	The engine failed due to fuel exhaustion and a forced landing was carried out.	
12 August 1983	(Soviet Union) Odessa Region	An-2R	CCCP-07697	Ukraine	W/O	0	Crashed due to overloading.	
30 August 1983	(Soviet Union) Off Alma-Ata	Tu-134A	CCCP-65129	Privolzhsk	W/O	90/90	The aircraft was in the last stages of a domestic scheduled Kazan–Chelyabinsk–Alma-Ata passenger service as Flight 5463, when it crashed into mountainous terrain, in a premature descent, on approach to Alma-Ata Airport.	
19 October 1983	(Soviet Union) Kansk Air Base	L-410UVP	CCCP-67315	Krasnoyarsk	W/O	0	Inbound from Krasnoyarsk, the crew diverted to Kansk-Dalni due to poor weather at Kansk-Tsentralny. The aircraft landed in poor weather and touched down too late, overrunning the runway and striking an obstacle.	
18 November 1983	(Soviet Union) Tbilisi	Tu-134A	CCCP-65807	Georgia	W/O	8	The aircraft was hijacked while en route a Tbilisi–Leningrad passenger service. Some of the hijackers entered the flight deck opening fire as they tried to gain control of the aircraft, yet the crew performed violent maneuvers, eventually keeping the hijackers off the cockpit. The airplane landed safely at Tbilisi Airport and there were no casualties by then, but it was later stormed by security forces. Eight occupants —3 hijackers among them— were killed amid the gunfire. The deformation the airframe underwent during the sharp maneuvers exceeded the ones it could possibly withstand, and it was written off.	
24 December 1983	(Soviet Union) Leshukonskoye	An-24RV	CCCP-46617	Arkhangelsk	W/O	44/49	The aircraft that was covering the Arkhangelsk–Leshukonskoye route as Flight 601, crashed ahead of the runway threshold on final approach to Leshukonskoye Airport, while attempting a go-around.	
1984	(Soviet Union) Minsk	Tu-134A	CCCP-65095	Belarus	W/O	0/0	Destroyed by fire in a maintenance facility at Minsk-1 Airport.	
28 January 1984	(Soviet Union) Izhevsk	An-24RV	CCCP-47310	Ural	W/O	4/53	Crash-landed at Izhevsk Airport when the pilot attempted to land the aircraft with a failure on one of the elevators due to a maintenance error. The aircraft was operating a domestic scheduled Kuybyshev-Izhevsk passengers service as Flight 923.	
11 February 1984	(Angola) Cuenca Sul	An-12	Unknown	Unknown	W/O	Unknown	Shot down by rebels.	
23 February 1984	(Soviet Union) Tiksi	An-2T	CCCP-44910	Yakut	W/O	0/0	Damaged by a storm while standing at Tiksi Airport.	
6 May 1984	(Soviet Union) Staroye Zhookovo	An-2M	CCCP-05918	Central	W/O	Unknown	The aircraft was performing a crop spraying mission when an excessive deflection of the elevator caused it to crash northwest of Staroye Zhookovo, catching fire.	
21 May 1984	(Soviet Union) Voroshilovgrad Region	An-2R	CCCP-07293	Ukraine	W/O	0	Crashed while performing a low turn over a ravine while crop-spraying.	
16 June 1984	(Soviet Union) Odessa Region	An-2R	CCCP-02528	Ukraine	W/O	0	Crashed on takeoff due to a bird strike.	
21 June 1984	(Soviet Union) Sivakovka	An-2R	CCCP-09612	Far East	W/O	0	Suffered a bird strike, causing the engine to quit as the bird clogged the air intake. A forced landing was carried out.	
4 July 1984	(Soviet Union) Chulman Airport	L-410M	CCCP-67276	Yakut	W/O	0	Landed hard, collapsing the nosegear.	
5 July 1984	(Soviet Union) Kustanai Region	An-2R	CCCP-02878	Ural	W/O	3/3	During a crop-spraying, the crew, who was drunk, took the aircraft on an unauthorized flight. The aircraft crashed after the crew performed stunts at low altitude.	
14 July 1984	(Soviet Union) Krasnodar Krai	An-2R	CCCP-40827	North Caucasus	W/O	2/3	Crashed while performing a crop spraying mission.	
23 July 1984	(Soviet Union) Punya	An-2R	CCCP-01712	Krasnoyarsk	W/O	0	Crashed shortly after takeoff after being caught by a wind gust.	
24 July 1984	(Soviet Union) Krasnoselkap	An-26B	CCCP-26009	Tyumen	W/O	0	Runway overrun.	
24 July 1984	(Soviet Union) Lazurnoye	An-2T	CCCP-82909	Ukraine	W/O	0	Long landing at Lazurnoye Airport, inbound from Krivoy Rog. Overshot the runway and collided with obstacles.	
19 August 1984	(Soviet Union) Aktyubinsk Airport	Il-86	CCCP-86007	Moscow	Repaired	0	During a domestic scheduled Tashkent–Moscow passenger service, the inner sections of the wing flaps began vibrating severely and broke off 75 seconds later, damaging the rear of the fuselage. An emergency landing was made at Aktyubinsk (now Aktobe) and the aircraft touched down at 345 km/h (214 mph), blowing out seven landing gear tires.	
16 September 1984	(Soviet Union) Saaremaa	Il-14FK	CCCP-91611	Leningrad	W/O	0/10	The aircraft was operating a research flight, when a failure on the starboard engine occurred. The captain decided to ditch it in the Irbe Strait.	
25 September 1984	(Soviet Union) Koltsovo Airport	An-24RV	CCCP-47358	West Siberia	Repaired	1/41	The An-24 departed Sverdlovsk for Omsk and Kemerovo. When climbing through an altitude of 250 m the turbine of the RU-19A-300 APU suffered an uncontained failure. Parts of the turbine disc penetrated the fuselage, killing one passenger and injuring two. The aircraft managed to land safely back at Sverdlovsk. Was due to operate the Sverdlovsk-Omsk-Kemerovo passenger service as Flight 7010.	
4 October 1984	(Soviet Union) Pavlodar	An-2T	CCCP-35434	Kazakhstan	W/O	0/6	During a low-altitude survey flight over hilly terrain, the aircraft was caught in a downdraft. The left wheel and left lower wing hit a hill before the crew regained control. The crew continued to Shoptykol where a forced landing was performed, but the aircraft suffered more damage and was ultimately written off.	
4 October 1984	(Soviet Union) Sredni Kalar	An-2R	CCCP-35434	East Siberia	W/O	0	Force-landed in taiga after the engine failed due to carburetor icing.	
11 October 1984 (Note: There is a discrepancy over the date of occurrence, as it was claimed it happened on 11 October, or 15 October.)	(Soviet Union) Omsk	Tu-154B-1	CCCP-85243	East Siberia	W/O	178	Hit two snowplows upon landing in poor visibility at Omsk Airport, inbound from Krasnodar as Flight 3352, and caught fire. (Note: It was also stated that one of the vehicles the aircraft hit was a fuel bowser.) There were 179 people aboard, of whom 174 lost their lives in the accident; there were also 4 casualties on the ground.	
4 December 1984	(Soviet Union) Kostroma	L-410MA	CCCP-67225	Central	W/O	17/17	While climbing through 1,500 m (4,900 ft) after takeoff from Kostroma Airport the artificial horizon failed. The aircraft was in clouds and the pilots became disorientated. The aircraft entered a descent with increasing bank. At 500–600 m (1,600–2,000 ft) the aircraft came out of clouds, allowing the crew to correct the attitude of the aircraft, but while pulling out of the dive the aircraft again entered clouds and the pilots became disorientated a second time. The aircraft entered a steep dive, losing altitude. The crew could not recover and the aircraft struck trees and terrain. The aircraft was operating a domestic scheduled Kostroma-Ivanovo-Ulyanovsk passenger service as Flight F-637.	
18 December 1984	(Soviet Union) Verkhne Imbatskoye Airport	An-2	CCCP-07861	Krasnoyarsk	W/O	0	Control was lost and the aircraft crashed on takeoff. The center of gravity was too far to the rear.	
23 December 1984	(Soviet Union) Krasnoyarsk	Tu-154B-2	CCCP-85338	Krasnoyarsk	W/O	110/111	Had a failure in one of its engines shortly after takeoff from Krasnoyarsk Airport; it caught fire, yet the flight engineer shut down the incorrect one. The fire propagated to the empennage, making the aircraft uncontrollable just before it could land safely. It was due to operate a domestic scheduled Krasnoyarsk–Irkutsk passenger service as Flight 3519.	
29 December 1984	(Soviet Union) Off Astrakhan	L-410UVP	CCCP-67140	North Caucasus	W/O	0	Before takeoff, the ground crew forgot to close the fuel fill caps. En route fuel was sucked out of the tanks, causing both engines to quit. The aircraft force-landed 76 km (47 mi) away from Astrakhan.	
1985	(Soviet Union) Sosnovaya Roscha	An-2TP	CCCP-32352	Kazakhstan	W/O	Unknown	The aircraft was severely damaged after it nosed over and ended up upside-down; aircraft was possibly written off.	
24 January 1985	(Soviet Union) Lake Byeloye	An-2R	CCCP-19716	Leningrad	W/O	0	Crashed on the frozen surface of Lake Byeloye while flying low.	
1 February 1985	(Soviet Union) Minsk	Tu-134AK	CCCP-65910	Belarus	W/O	58/80	Crashed during initial climbout, 10 kilometres (6.2 mi) away from Minsk-2 International Airport, because of flameout of both engines, which had ingested ice during the takeoff run. Due to operate a domestic scheduled Minsk–Leningrad passenger service as Flight 7841.	
25 March 1985	(Soviet Union) Borogon Airport	An-2T	CCCP-44905	Yakut	W/O	0/3	During takeoff, the flaps retracted due to a short circuit. After reaching an altitude of 6–8 m (20–26 ft), the aircraft entered a descent and crashed in snowy terrain 250 m (820 ft) past the runway. Due to operate a Borogon–Tiksi cargo service.	
3 May 1985	(Soviet Union) Zolochiv	Tu-134A	CCCP-65856	Estonia	W/O	94/94	The Tu-134A was minutes away from completing a domestic scheduled Tallinn–Lvov passenger service as Flight 8381 with 79 people aboard, On approach to Sknyliv Airport, it was involved in a mid-air, head-on collision with a Soviet Air Force Antonov An-26, that was carrying 15 people on board and had departed the same airport. The collision occurred over Zolochiv at an approximate altitude of 13,000 feet (4,000 m), killing all occupants from both aircraft.	
3 May 1985	(Soviet Union) Zolochiv	An-26	CCCP-26492	—N/a	W/O	94/94	The Tu-134A was minutes away from completing a domestic scheduled Tallinn–Lvov passenger service as Flight 8381 with 79 people aboard, On approach to Sknyliv Airport, it was involved in a mid-air, head-on collision with a Soviet Air Force Antonov An-26, that was carrying 15 people on board and had departed the same airport. The collision occurred over Zolochiv at an approximate altitude of 13,000 feet (4,000 m), killing all occupants from both aircraft.	
11 May 1985	(Soviet Union) Kyzyl Airport	An-2TP	CCCP-50553	Krasnoyarsk	W/O	0/2	Veered off the runway on landing due to brake problems.	
21 May 1985	(Soviet Union) Tadibeyakha	An-2	CCCP-04326	Tyumen	W/O	0/20	Could not gain altitude after takeoff, lost speed, and crash-landed. The aircraft had ten illegal passengers on board.	
29 May 1985	(Soviet Union) Rzhevka	An-2R	CCCP-70218	Leningrad	W/O	4/5	Crashed near Rzhevka Airport during a test flight. The engine lost power just after takeoff. While attempting a forced landing, the aircraft struck trees and crashed.	
10 June 1985	(Soviet Union) Stavropol Krai	An-2R	CCCP-32028	Uzbekistan	W/O	2/3	Lost speed and crashed in the Stavropol Krai after the pilot tried to gain altitude and the aircraft banked steeply. Was performing a crop spraying mission.	
20 June 1985	(Soviet Union) Moma	An-2TP	CCCP-91783	Yakut	W/O	0	Crash-landed shortly after takeoff from Moma Airport, as it could not gain altitude because of overloading.	
27 June 1985	(Soviet Union) Suduntui	An-2R	CCCP-84724	East Siberia	W/O	0	Force-landed after the engine failed due to poor-quality fuel.	
4 July 1985	(Soviet Union) Baykit	An-2R	CCCP-55710	Krasnoyarsk	W/O	0	Departed overloaded from Baykit Airport. The crew attempted to return to the airport as the aircraft was unable to gain altitude, yet it crash-landed before reaching the airfield.	
7 July 1985	(Soviet Union) Krasny Yar district	An-2	CCCP-06255	Privolzhsk	W/O	0/2	During a crop-spraying flight the engine lost power, due to valve problems with cylinder seven. The crew attempted a forced landing but the aircraft struck trees and crashed.	
10 July 1985	(Soviet Union) Uchkuduk	Tu-154B-2	CCCP-85311	Uzbekistan	W/O	200/200	The aircraft was operating a domestic scheduled Tashkent–Karshi–Orenburg–Leningrad passenger service as Flight 5143. It crashed near Uchkuduk while en route its second leg, when the crew mistook in-flight vibrations due to low airspeed with engine surges and reduced power, leading to an even lower airspeed that eventually stalled the aircraft. This crash is the worst ever accident involving the Tu-154 and Aeroflot's deadliest accident.	
15 July 1985	(Soviet Union) Selitrennoye	An-2R	CCCP-55706	Georgia	W/O	0/2	The engine failed during a crop-spraying flight while the aircraft was in a banking turn. Altitude was lost and the aircraft banked left and crashed into a building.	
1 September 1985	(Soviet Union) Yunkor	An-2P	CCCP-01789	Yakut	W/O	0	Force-landed following engine failure. The engine control lever had disconnected due to faulty maintenance while on final approach.	
11 October 1985	(Soviet Union) Off Kutaisi	Yak-40	CCCP-87803	Georgia	W/O	14/14	Crashed into mountainous terrain, 97 kilometres (60 mi) west of Kutaisi, when it was flying at a low altitude in bad weather, following air traffic controllers indications. It was operating a domestic scheduled Kutaisi–Poti passenger service as Flight D-7.	
19 December 1985	(China) Gannan	An-24B	CCCP-42845	Yakut	None	0/51	Hijacked by a man who demanded that the crew change course. The aircraft ran out of fuel and landed in a pasture near Gannan, China; the hijacker was arrested by Chinese authorities and the aircraft and the 43 people on board were returned to the Soviet Union. The aircraft was operating a domestic scheduled Yakutsk–Takhtamygda–Chita–Irkutsk passenger service as Flight 101/435.	
6 February 1986	(Soviet Union) Saransk	An-26B	CCCP-26095	Belarus	W/O	0/6	Crashed and broke up shortly after takeoff from Saransk Airport, when the captain mistook the localizer and inner marker beacon red lights with the anti-collision lights of an incoming aircraft, performing a violent evasive maneuver and losing control of the airplane.	
17 February 1986	(Antarctica) Philippi Glacier	Il-14M	CCCP-41816	Central	W/O	6/6	Ran out of fuel as it encountered stronger-than-expected headwinds while flying a cargo service within Antarctica between the Molodezhnaya Station and the Mirny Station, crashing into the slope of the Philippi Glacier when attempting an emergency landing under whiteout conditions.	
2 March 1986	(Soviet Union) Bugulma	An-24B	CCCP-46423	Central	W/O	38/38	Crashed on approach to Bugulma Airport, inbound from Cheboksary as Flight F-77, following the feathering of one of the propellers.	
18 April 1986	(Soviet Union) Kazan	Yak-40	CCCP-87236	Privolzhsk	W/O	0	Structural failure at Kazan Airport.	
18 April 1986	(Soviet Union) Chita Airport	Yak-40	CCCP-87301	Yakut	W/O	0/32	While landing, the right landing gear collapsed due to fatigue. The right wing contacted the runway and the aircraft slid off the runway.	
13 May 1986	(Soviet Union) Ledovaya Baza	An-12TB	CCCP-12962	Krasnoyarsk	W/O	0	Sank when the ice surface it was being towed over for repairs cracked.	
17 May 1986	(Soviet Union) Off Khanty-Mansiysk	Yak-40	CCCP-87928	Yakut	W/O	5/5	A test was being run following undercarriage repairs. During a pullout, the left wing broke off and its debris struck the tail, which broke off as well, causing the aircraft to crash 19 kilometres (12 mi) away from Khanty-Mansiysk.	
21 May 1986	(Soviet Union) Moscow	Tu-154B-2	CCCP-85327	Krasnoyarsk	W/O	0	The flightcrew forgot to turn on the heating system of the pitot tube prior to takeoff from Chelyabinsk, and that condition persisted all the way to Moscow. Due to icing on the approach to Domodedovo Airport, the crew increased power as they mistakenly assumed the plane was about to stall due to incorrect speed readings. Despite the landing being performed at a higher-than-normal speed, the crew managed to land the plane safely. The airframe sustained major damage because of the stresses it underwent on the descent.	
6 June 1986	(Soviet Union) Sangar	An-2TP	CCCP-29348	Yakut	W/O	0/10	En route between Kobyai and Sangar the engine lost power at 550 m (1,800 ft) and a forced landing was carried out in a swampy forest clearing. The engine failure was caused by improper repairs.	
22 June 1986	(Soviet Union) Penza	Tu-134A	CCCP-65142	Privolzhsk	W/O	1/59	Aborted takeoff at Penza Airport, ending up in a ravine. A passenger died from a heart attack. Due to operate a domestic scheduled Penza–Simferopol passenger service.	
2 July 1986	(Soviet Union) Kopsa	Tu-134AK	CCCP-65120	Komi	W/O	54/92	Crashed 75 kilometres (47 mi) southwest of Syktyvkar after it hit trees when attempting a forced landing due to a fire in the cargo hold. The aircraft was due to operate a domestic scheduled Vorkuta-Syktyvkar–Moscow passenger service as Flight 2306.	
11 July 1986	Unknown	An-2R	CCCP-70124	Yakut	W/O	Unknown	Crashed into a forest.	
11 August 1986	(Soviet Union) Konder Mountain	An-2R	CCCP-40902	Far East	W/O	2/4	One of the wings struck trees when the pilot was maneuvering the aircraft to drop off mail.	
20 September 1986	(Soviet Union) Ufa Airport	Tu-134A	CCCP-65877	Ukraine	Repaired	4/78	The aircraft was parked at Ufa Airport for a flight to Nizhnevartovsk from Kiev as Flight 36075. Three men, soldiers of the Internal Troops of the Ministry of Internal Affairs and intending to flee the country, carjacked a taxi and forced the driver to take them to Ufa Airport; along the way, the men shot and killed two police officers. The hijackers entered the aircraft; one of them pointed his machine gun at a flight attendant and ordered the pilot to take off in 20 minutes and fly to "any country that was unfriendly to the Soviet Union". Twenty minutes later, two passengers were shot. The hijackers were eventually persuaded to release all hostages; the aircraft was then stormed by Alpha Group, who arrested the hijackers.	
September 1986	(Soviet Union) Moscow	Yak-42	CCCP-42536	Central	W/O	0	Destroyed by fire ignited by a thunderflash while standing at Bykovo Airport. The aircraft was being used by security forces for training purposes.	
9 October 1986	(Soviet Union) Tiksi	An-2R	CCCP-02592	Yakut	W/O	Unknown	Crashed into a hillside while en route from Taimilir to Tiksi.	
14 October 1986	(Soviet Union) Ust-Maya Airport	L-410M	CCCP-67264	Yakut	W/O	14/14	While accelerating for takeoff, the number one engine shut down. The propeller was feathered but the crew did not raise the landing gear. Unable to gain altitude, the aircraft stalled and crashed in the Aldan River and sank with all on board. Due to begin the second leg of a Magan–Ust-Maya–Allakh passenger service as Flight 763. The aircraft had lost control on takeoff.	
20 October 1986	(Soviet Union) Kuybyshev	Tu-134A	CCCP-65766	North Caucasus	W/O	70/92	Skidded off the runway following a hard landing at Kuybyshev Airport, broke up, and caught fire. The aircraft was operating a domestic scheduled Sverdlovsk-Kuybyshev service as Flight 6502.	
12 December 1986	(East Germany) East Berlin	Tu-134A	CCCP-65795	Belarus	W/O	72/82	Hit trees on approach to Schönefeld Airport, inbound from Minsk, and crashed. The aircraft was operating an international scheduled passenger service as Flight 892.	
31 December 1986	(Soviet Union) Chernenko	L-410UVP	CCCP-67428	Krasnoyarsk	W/O	0	Ran off the apron.	
16 January 1987	(Soviet Union) Tashkent	Yak-40	CCCP-87618	Uzbekistan	W/O	9/9	Crashed shortly after takeoff from Yuzhny Airport as it encountered a wake vortex generated by the departure of an Ilyushin Il-76 moments before. Due to operate a domestic scheduled Tashkent–Shahrisabz passenger service as Flight U-505.	
25 January 1987	(Soviet Union) Tarnogsky Gorodok Airport	Yak-40	CCCP-87696	Northern	W/O	0/26	During takeoff, the nosewheel steering failed. The aircraft veered left off the runway and crashed into an embankment.	
7 February 1987	(Soviet Union) Sverdlovsk	An-12TB	CCCP-11378	Magadan	W/O	Unknown	Written off at Sverdlovsk Airport under unspecified circumstances.	
6 March 1987	(Soviet Union) Off Alma-Ata	An-26	CCCP-26007	Tajikistan	W/O	9/9	Struck a 2,370-metre-high (7,780 ft) mountain, 56 kilometres (35 mi) away from Alma-Ata, soon after it departed from Alma-Ata Airport for a cargo service.	
24 April 1987	(Soviet Union) Arctic Ocean	An-2	CCCP-62566	Yakut	W/O	0	Sank when the ice of a frozen lake the aircraft had landed on broke.	
April 1987	Unknown	An-2R	CCCP-56436	North Caucasus	W/O	Unknown	Crashed.	
23 May 1987	(Soviet Union) Khandyga	An-26	CCCP-26567	Yakut	W/O	Unknown	Crashed short of the runway.	
27 May 1987	(Sweden) Östergarnsholm	An-2R	CCCP-70501	Latvia	W/O	0/1	The aircraft was stolen by a pilot seeking political asylum, who flew the airplane from Saldus to Sweden, and ditched it off Östergarnsholm on the island of Gotland. The aircraft is now in an aviation museum in Visby.	
13 June 1987	Unknown	L-410M	CCCP-67239	Yakut	W/O	Unknown	Involved in a ground accident with two An-2s (CCCP-70129 and CCCP-84655).	
19 June 1987	(Soviet Union) Berdyansk	Yak-40	CCCP-87826	Ukraine	W/O	8/29	Overran the runway following an aborted go-around at Berdyansk Airport, hit obstacles and caught fire. The aircraft was operating a domestic scheduled Odessa-Berdyansk service as Flight N-528.	
20 July 1987	Unknown	An-2TP	CCCP-40556	Yakut	W/O	Unknown	Main undercarriage broke off upon landing.	
21 July 1987	Unknown	An-2TP	CCCP-02763	Yakut	W/O	Unknown	Crash-landed on a farm field.	
23 July 1987	(Soviet Union) Ivanovo	Tu-134A-3	CCCP-65874	Ukraine	W/O	Unknown	Unknown	
14 August 1987	(Soviet Union) Ust-Nem	An-28	CCCP-28741	Komi	W/O	0	Hard landing.	
22 August 1987	(Soviet Union) Novosibirsk	An-2R	CCCP-01641	West Siberia	W/O	0/14	Force-landed in a forest following a loss of engine power.	
28 August 1987	(Soviet Union) Alisovo	An-2	Unknown	Ukraine	W/O	0/2	Lost power on takeoff and force-landed in a ravine.	
7 September 1987	(Soviet Union) Omsk	An-12TB	CCCP-12971	Magadan	W/O	Unknown	Unknown	
24 September 1987	(Soviet Union) Yakutsk	L-410MU	CCCP-67249	Yakut	W/O	0	Aborted takeoff at Yakutsk Airport.	
18 October 1987	(Soviet Union) Saratov	L-410UVP	CCCP-67334	Privolzhsk	W/O	0	Belly landing at Saratov Airport.	
15 December 1987	(Soviet Union) Pyatigorsk	An-2R	CCCP-06324	North Caucasus	W/O	Unknown	Crashed.	
18 January 1988	(Soviet Union) Krasnovodsk	Tu-154B-1	CCCP-85254	Turkmenistan	W/O	11/143 (Note: There exists a discrepancy over the number of occupants aboard the aircraft, as it was also informed to be 104.)	The aircraft was completing a domestic scheduled Moscow–Krasnovodsk passenger service as Flight 699. A hard landing at Krasnovodsk Airport caused the empennage to separate from the airframe, which also broke up.	
24 January 1988	(Soviet Union) Nizhnevartovsk	Yak-40	CCCP-87549	Privolzhsk	W/O	27/31	Port and starboard engines failed on takeoff from Nizhnevartovsk Airport, causing the aircraft to lose speed during the initial climbout, eventually stalling, losing altitude and crashing into a slope of a ravine. Due to operate a domestic scheduled Nizhnevartovsk–Tyumen passenger service as Flight 29674.	
26 February 1988	(Soviet Union) Saskylakh	An-2R	CCCP-01648	Yakut	W/O	Unknown	Unknown	
27 February 1988	(Soviet Union) Surgut	Tu-134AK	CCCP-65675	Belarus	W/O	20/51	The aircraft was operating a domestic scheduled Tyumen–Surgut passenger service as Flight 7867. It performed a hard landing at Surgut Airport, broke up and caught fire.	
8 March 1988	(Soviet Union) Leningrad	Tu-154B-2	CCCP-85413	East Siberia	W/O	9/84 (Note: The number of fatalities for this hijacking episode vary, ranging from four, to nine.)	The aircraft was en route a domestic scheduled Irkutsk–Leningrad passenger service as when it was hijacked by a family who demanded to be flown to the United Kingdom. Russian troops stormed the airplane while making a refuelling stop at Pulkovo Airport. As a result, five of the hijackers were killed, along with three passengers and an air hostess. The airframe sustained major damages on its empennage during the raid, and was written off.	
19 April 1988 (Note: There is a difference of a week in the date of occurrence depending upon the source.)	(Soviet Union) Bagdarin	L-410UVP	CCCP-67518	East Siberia	W/O	17/17	Struck a hill in a blizzard, near Bagdarin, while en route a domestic scheduled Muya–Bagdarin passenger service. The crew had deviated from the flight route and descended too soon and too low.	
19 April 1988	(Soviet Union) Ulan-Ude	L-410UVP	CCCP-67431	East Siberia	W/O	Unknown	Crashed at Ulan-Ude Airport.	
9 June 1988	(Soviet Union) Tobolsk	An-2R	CCCP-70121	Tyumen	W/O	2/2	Crashed and caught fire, 15.4 kilometres (9.6 mi) away from Tobolsk, after it struck the top of a chimney.	
12 June 1988	(Soviet Union) Aleksandriya	An-2TP	CCCP-32267	Ukraine	W/O	0/15	Forced-landed after engine flameout due to ingestion of rain as the aircraft entered a thunderstorm while en route from Rovno to Vladimirets.	
8 July 1988	(Soviet Union) Khabarovsk	An-24RV	CCCP-46669	Far East	W/O	0/46	Collided with buildings after it overran the runway on takeoff from Khabarovsk Airport.	
9 July 1988	Unknown	An-2P	CCCP-07791	Central	W/O	0	Struck the ground after the pilot unintentionally moved the steering wheel.	
22 July 1988	Unknown	An-2	Unknown	Unknown	W/O	0	Lost control when it entered a turbulence region at low altitude.	
12 August 1988	Unknown	An-2R	CCCP-35677	Ukraine	W/O	0	Crash-landed minutes after takeoff following fuel exhaustion.	
26 August 1988	(Soviet Union) Kystatyam	An-2P	CCCP-01788	Yakut	W/O	1/4	Crashed near Kystatyam while operating a survey flight along the Lena River.	
26 August 1988	(Soviet Union) Irkutsk	L-410MU	CCCP-67235	Yakut	W/O	4/4	Crashed into the slope of a mountain during approach to Irkutsk Airport, breaking up and catching fire. The crew had set the altimeters incorrectly during the approach; crew fatigue was also a factor. The aircraft was operating a domestic non-scheduled Kirensk–Irkutsk passenger service.	
21 September 1988	(Soviet Union) Aiykan	An-2TP	CCCP-70848	Far East	W/O	2/2	Struck a 1,350-metre-high (4,430 ft) mountain, 10 kilometres (6.2 mi) east of Aiykan.	
24 September 1988	(Syria) Aleppo	Tu-154B-2	CCCP-85479	Armenia	W/O	0/168	Had an undisclosed landing gear collapse when it hard-landed at Aleppo Airport, overrunning the runway. The center of gravity of the aircraft was off the limits. It was operating an international scheduled Yerevan–Aleppo passenger service.	
24 September 1988	Unknown	An-2R	CCCP-84657	Yakut	W/O	Unknown	Crash-landed on a river bed.	
4 October 1988	(Soviet Union) Batagay	An-12BP	CCCP-11418	Yakut	W/O	6/6	Crashed into a mountain on approach to Batagay Airport, 25 kilometres (16 mi) off the city. The aircraft was operating a cargo service inbound from Tiksi as Flight 40066.	
14 October 1988	Unknown	An-2R	CCCP-32612	Yakut	W/O	Unknown	Emergency landing on rough terrain.	
31 October 1988	(Soviet Union) Belaya Gora (Note: Discrepant location)	An-2TP	CCCP-32325	Yakut	W/O	Unknown	Hard landing.	
7 December 1988	(Soviet Union) Kodinsk	L-410UVP	CCCP-67127	Krasnoyarsk	W/O	6/14	Crashed when it struck the ground on approach to Kodinsk, inbound from Krasnoyarsk on a domestic scheduled passenger service.	
13 December 1988	(Soviet Union) Naryan-Mar	An-2R	CCCP-06266	Arkhangelsk	W/O	0	Crashed. The aircraft was overloaded and the center of gravity was beyond limits.	
1989	(Soviet Union) Tver-Smeevo	An-2R	CCCP-70087	Central	W/O	Unknown	Crashed.	
13 January 1989	(Soviet Union) Sverdlovsk	An-12B	CCCP-12997	Ural	W/O	0	Both starboard engines jammed at full power shortly after takeoff from Koltsovo Airport. The crew decided to return to the airport of departure; following touchdown, the aircraft burst into flames after bouncing and groundlooping.	
13 January 1989	(Liberia) Monrovia	Tu-154S	CCCP-85067	International	W/O	0	Failed to get airborne on takeoff from Roberts International Airport, overrunning the runway and ending up in a ditch. The aircraft was overloaded and cargo not properly secured shifted on takeoff, putting its center of gravity beyond the forward limits. Due to operate a Monrovia–Bamako cargo service.	
26 January 1989	(Soviet Union) Mirny Ice Station	Avia 14PT	CCCP-52066	Central	W/O	3	Burned out during refueling. The aircraft had not been properly grounded on the ice to prevent static discharge, and it was this discharge that ignited the fuel.	
22 April 1989	(Soviet Union) Tatarski	An-2R	CCCP-70080	Privolzhsk	W/O	0/3	While on a positioning flight to a state farm, the pilot attempted to perform a pancake landing as he thought the ground was waterlogged. The aircraft lost speed, stalled over the left wing and crashed.	
1 May 1989	(Soviet Union) Sechenovo	An-2R	CCCP-70225	Privolzhsk	W/O	5/5	Crashed while it was taking part in a Labour Day demonstration.	
11 May 1989	(Soviet Union) Dolbizno	An-2R	CCCP-54891	Belarus	W/O	4/4	The aircraft was crop-spraying for the "Rossiya" collective farm with two passengers on board. Control was lost in a steep turn at 15–20 m (49–66 ft) and the aircraft crashed and burned out. The crew was apparently drunk.	
6 July 1989	(Soviet Union) Cape Schmidt	Il-14M	CCCP-61788	Yakut	W/O	0	Ditched in shallow waters following loss of power in one of the engines shortly after takeoff from Mys Shmidta Airport. Due to operate an ice reconnaissance flight.	
19 July 1989	(Soviet Union) Talovrow Island	An-26	CCCP-26685	Yakut	W/O	10/10	The aircraft was on a survey flight along the shore of the East Siberian Sea, from Cape Schmidt to Pevek Airport, when one of its wings hit coastal cliffs, causing it to crash.	
14 August 1989	(Soviet Union) Neryungri	Yak-40	CCCP-88252	Yakut	W/O	0	Landed in crosswind conditions on a wet runway at Neryungri Airport, inbound from Chita as Flight 432.	
28 August 1989	(Soviet Union) Labinsk	L-410UVP	CCCP-67104	North Caucasus	W/O	0/17	Shortly after takeoff, at 100–200 m (330–660 ft), the left engine failed. The crew decided to return to Labinsk but while turning back the aircraft began to roll to the left and started losing altitude. A wheels-up emergency landing was made in an alfalfa field near the airport.	
2 September 1989	(Soviet Union) Bishkek	Yak-40	CCCP-87509	Kyrgyzstan	W/O	0	Belly landed at Bishkek Airport.	
15 September 1989	(Soviet Union) Dzhalal-Abad	Yak-40	CCCP-87391	Kyrgyzstan	W/O	0/30	Bounced several times upon landing.	
2 October 1989	(Soviet Union) Yar-Sale	An-2T	CCCP-33078	Tyumen	W/O	0	En route over the Yamal Peninsula the engine failed. A forced landing was performed in tundra, damaging the landing gear, propeller, and lower wings.	
4 October 1989	(Soviet Union) Stepnogorsk	An-24RV	CCCP-46525	Kazakhstan	W/O	0/51	Overran the runway on landing and hit a concrete mast.	
20 October 1989	(Soviet Union) Leninakan	Il-76TD	CCCP-76466	Ulyanovsk Flight School	W/O	25/25	Crashed into the terrain on approach to Leninakan Airport, following an erroneous instrument setting on the aircraft, barometric altimeter. It was operating a training/cargo service between Ulyanovsk and Leninakan.	
21 November 1989	(Soviet Union) Tyumen	An-24B	CCCP-46335	Ural	W/O	34/42	The aircraft was completing a domestic scheduled Perm–Tyumen passenger service as Flight 37577, when it collided with trees on approach to Tyumen Airport and crashed.	
24 November 1989	(Soviet Union) Dzhambul	An-2	CCCP-44953	Kazakhstan	W/O	1/12	After takeoff the aircraft encountered icing conditions and fog, which the crew did not know about. Icing caused a loss of engine power. The crew then decided to return to the airport but airspeed decreased further until the aircraft stalled and crashed. The aircraft was operating a domestic scheduled Dzhambul-Zhezhazgan passenger service as Flight 587.	

== See also ==
- Aeroflot accidents and incidents
- Aeroflot accidents and incidents in the 1950s
- Aeroflot accidents and incidents in the 1960s
- Aeroflot accidents and incidents in the 1970s
- Aeroflot accidents and incidents in the 1990s
- Transport in the Soviet Union
