= Aeroflot Flight 4225 =

1980 aviation accident

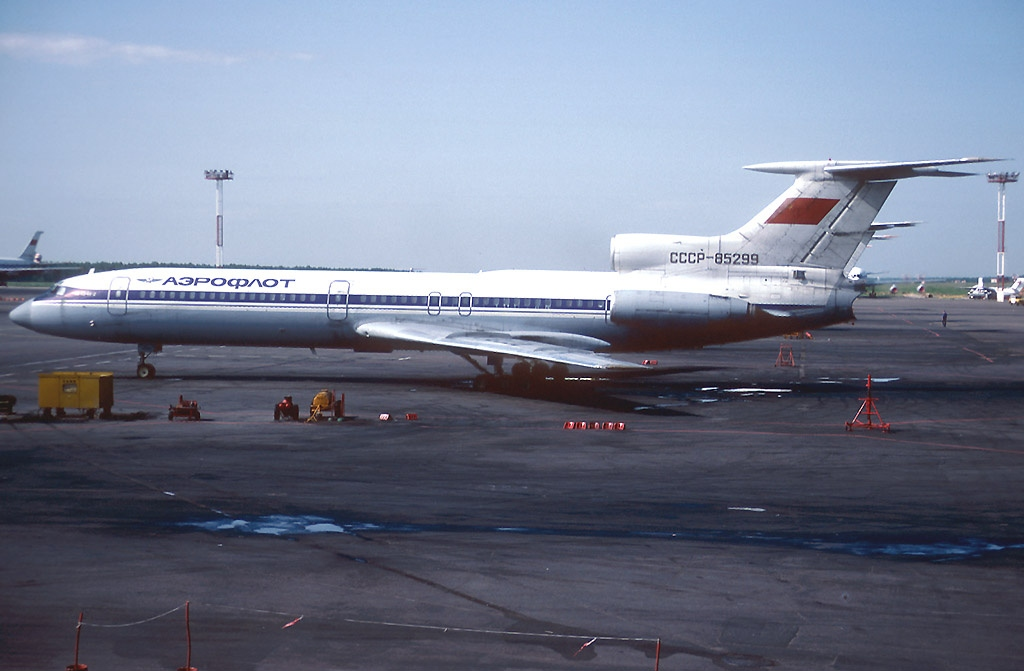
- An Aeroflot Tu-154B-2, similar to the aircraft involved in the accident

Accident
- Date: 8 July 1980
- Summary: Microburst-induced windshear, loss of airspeed due to thermal currents causing a stall
- Site: Near Almaty International Airport, Almaty, Kazakh SSR, Soviet Union; 43°19′42″N 76°59′19″E

Aircraft
- Aircraft type: Tupolev Tu-154B-2
- Operator: Aeroflot
- IATA flight No.: SU4225
- ICAO flight No.: AFL4225
- Call sign: AEROFLOT 4225
- Registration: CCCP-85355
- Flight origin: Almaty International Airport
- Destination: Simferopol Airport
- Occupants: 166
- Passengers: 156
- Crew: 10
- Fatalities: 166
- Survivors: 0

Aeroflot Flight 4225 was a Tupolev Tu-154B-2 on a scheduled domestic passenger flight from Alma-Ata Airport (now Almaty) to Simferopol Airport on 8 July 1980. The aircraft had reached an altitude of no more than 500 feet when the airspeed suddenly dropped because of thermal currents it encountered during the climb out. This caused the airplane to stall less than 5 kilometres (3.1 mi; 2.7 nmi) from the airport, crash and catch fire, killing all 156 passengers and 10 crew on board. To date, it remains the deadliest aviation accident in Kazakhstan. At the time, the crash was the deadliest involving a Tupolev Tu-154 until Aeroflot Flight 3352 crashed in 1984, killing 178 people.

== Accident ==
At the time of the accident, Alma-Ata was experiencing a heat wave. It was around 00:39 and Flight 4225 took off from Alma-Ata Airport in Soviet Kazakhstan. Only a few seconds after takeoff, the flight reached 500 feet (150 m) when the plane reached a zone of hot air and was caught in a downdraft. The Tupolev stalled, plummeted nose down into a farm near the suburbs of Alma-Ata and slid into a ravine, caught fire and disintegrated, killing everyone on board instantly.

== Investigation ==
The Soviet aviation board concluded that the crash was caused by windshear which took place while the aircraft was near its maximum takeoff weight for the local conditions which included mountains.

== See also ==
- Aeroflot accidents and incidents in the 1980s
- Pan Am Flight 759
- Delta Air Lines Flight 191
- USAir Flight 1016
