= Yar-Sale =

Yar-Sale Яр-Сале
- rural locality (selo)
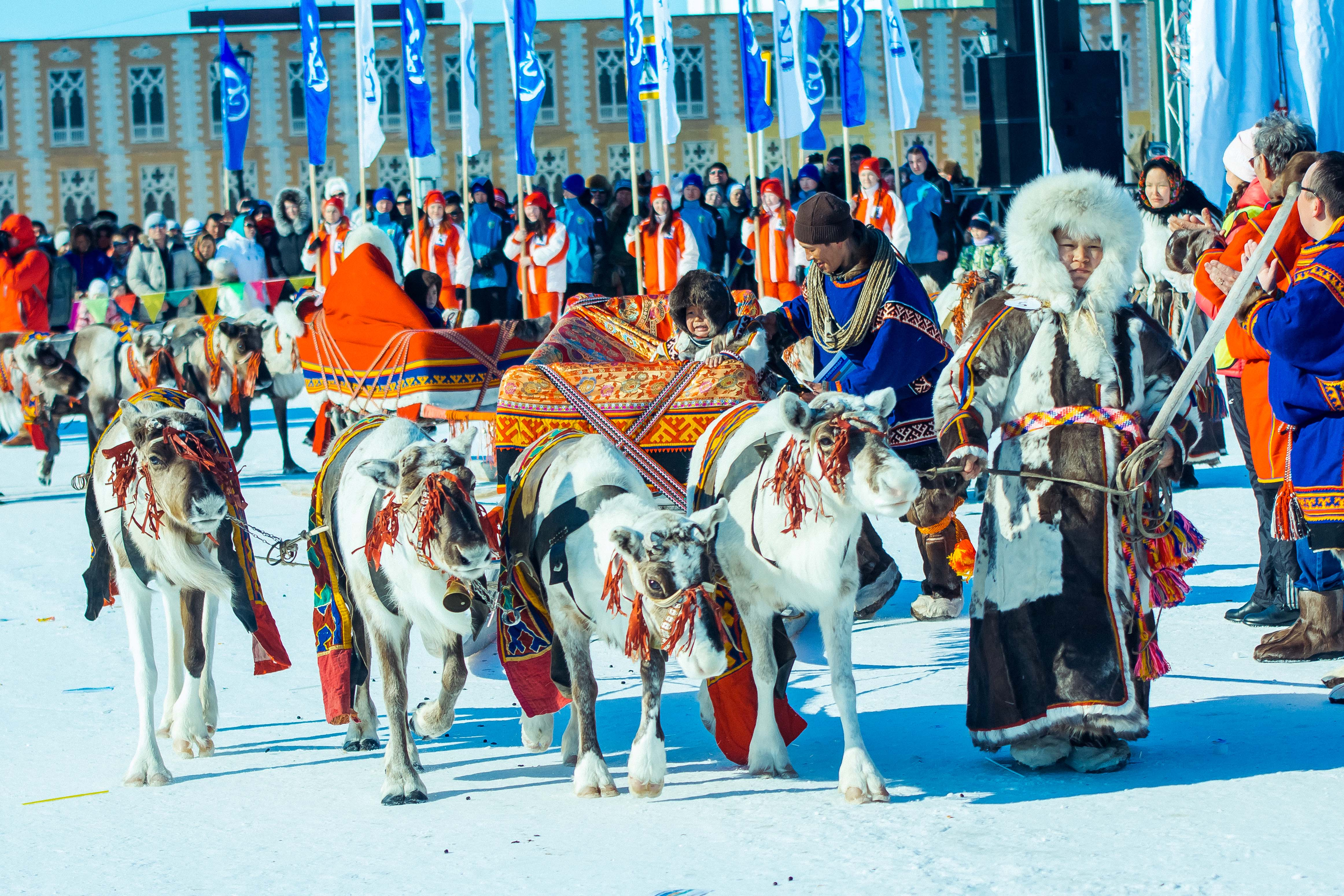

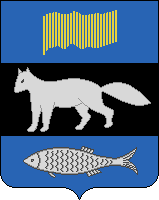
- Coat of arms
- Etymology: Nenets: "sandy cape"
- Location within Yamalo-Nenets Autonomous Okrug Location within Russia
- Coordinates: 66°51′55″N 70°50′16″E
- Country: Russia
- Federal subject: Yamalo-Nenets A.O.
- Raion: Yamalsky District
- Founded: 1927

Population (2010 Census)
  - Total: 6,486
- Time zone: UTC+05:00 (YEKT)
- Postal code: 629700
- Telephone code: +7 34996
- Geocode: 71 168 917 001 (OKATO); 71 928 417 101 (OKTMO)
- Vehicle registration: 89
- Website: adm-yarsale.ru

Yar-Sale (Russian: Яр-Сале) is a rural locality (a selo) in Russia located east of Salekhard near the Gulf of Ob in the northern part of Western Siberia. It is the administrative center of Yamalsky District, one of seven in Yamalo-Nenets Autonomous Okrug of Tyumen Oblast.

== History ==
Yar-Sale was founded in 1927, and in 1932 became the center of Yamalsky District. The village's name comes from the local Nenets yar, meaning "sandy" and sale, meaning "cape".

On 2 October 1989, an Aeroflot Antonov An-2T (registration CCCP-33078) flying over the Yamal Peninsula performed a forced landing in the tundra near Yar-Sale, causing irreparable damage to the aircraft's landing gear, propeller and wings.

== Demographics ==
Historical population
Year	1959	1970	1979	1989	2002	2010
Pop.	1,339	2,403	3,130	3,753	4,872	6,486
±%	—	+79.5%	+30.3%	+19.9%	+29.8%	+33.1%
Source: Demoscope Weekly

As of the 2010 Census, Yar-Sale had 6,486 inhabitants including 3,115 men (48.0%) and 3,371 women (52.0%), accounting for 39.8% of Yamalsky District's total population of 16,310. The village had grown from the previous 2002 Census, which recorded 4,872 inhabitants including 2,291 men (47.0%) and 2,581 women (53.0%).

== Economy and infrastructure ==
In recent decades, Yar-Sale grew in connection with the development of natural gas fields in the region. The village also sustains a local trade in processing reindeer, with products sold locally and exported to Germany. There is a museum of local lore in the village.

== Transportation ==
Yar-Sale Heliport (ICAO airport code: USDR) consists of two helipads: one north and one east of the settlement with the terminal building situated within the actual settlement.

There is regular water and air communication with Salekhard, but land travel is irregular during the rasputitsa seasons.
