= Aeroflot Flight U-505 =

1987 aviation accident

Coordinates: 41°18′40″N 69°16′47″E

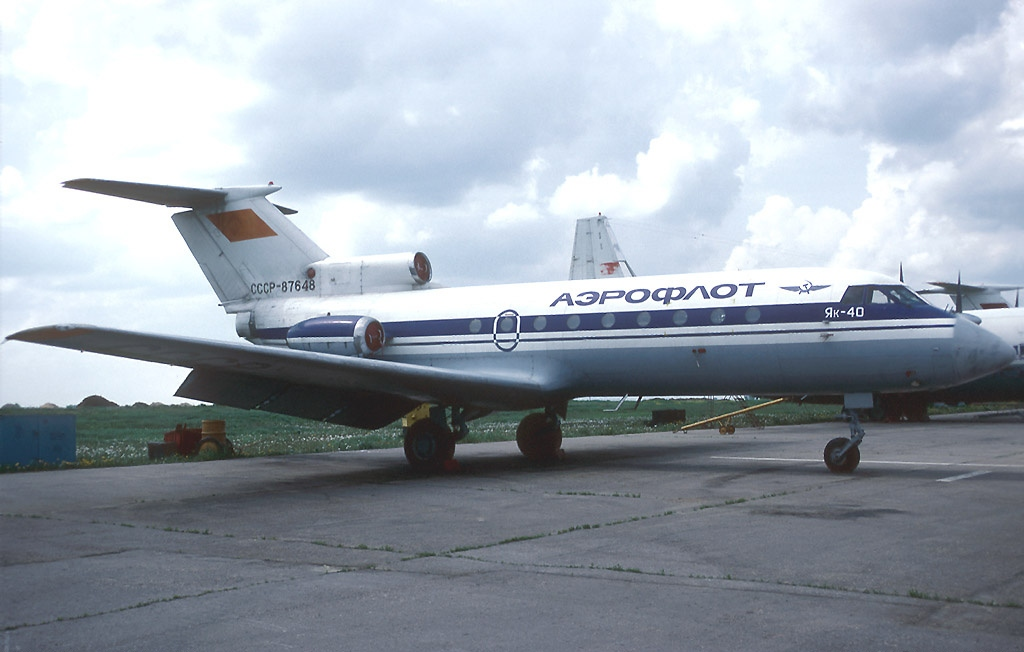
- An Aeroflot Yak-40, similar to the one involved.

Accident
- Date: 16 January 1987
- Summary: Wake turbulence (from an Il-76)
- Site: Tashkent Airport

Aircraft
- Aircraft type: Yakovlev Yak-40
- Operator: Aeroflot
- Registration: CCCP-87618
- Flight origin: Tashkent Airport, Tashkent
- Destination: Shahrisabz
- Passengers: 5
- Crew: 4
- Fatalities: 9
- Survivors: 0

Aeroflot Flight U-505 crashed just after takeoff in Tashkent on 16 January 1987. Flight 505 was an early morning flight from Tashkent to Shahrisabz, both in the Uzbek Soviet Socialist Republic, now the Republic of Uzbekistan. The flight took off just one minute and 28 seconds after an Ilyushin Il-76, thus encountering its wake vortex. The Yakovlev Yak-40 then banked sharply to the right, struck the ground, and caught fire. All 9 people on board died.

== Aircraft and crew ==
The aircraft involved, a Yakovlev Yak-40, c/n 9131918, was registered to Aeroflot as CCCP-87618, manufactured on 22 July 1971. At the time of the accident, the aircraft had sustained 17,132 flight hours and 20,927 cycles (one cycle equals one takeoff and landing).

The crew consisted of the following:

- Captain T. Yunusbek (Юнусбеков Т.)
- Co-pilot Valery Strunin (Струнин Валерий Александрович)
- Flight engineer R. F. Davydov (Давыдов Р. Ф.)

== Sequence of events ==
The plane was scheduled to ferry cargo from Tashkent to Shakhrisabz. On board were 1,200 kg (2,600 lb) of mail and 35 kilograms of personal luggage, along with four passengers seated in the cabin. Takeoff weight was 14.4 tons, within the acceptable range. The crew was in a hurry to depart because the cargo was not loaded until 6:00 local time and they were scheduled to depart Tashkent at 5:55; hence the crew took less than a minute to complete the preflight checklist instead of the usual five minutes. They proceeded to start taxiing on taxiway three to Runway 8L. At 6:09:40 the Il-76 (CCCP-76482) took off from the runway. Immediately they contacted the control tower and requested clearance for takeoff. After receiving permission to taxi onto the runway, and at 6:10:58 they took off without explicit permission to take off, in violation of procedure. The crew put the engines to full power accelerating at 124.2 knots; but at 6:11:04 when the aircraft was no more than 20 meters off the ground it started to bank sharply to the right and at 6:11:15 it crashed into the ground, killing all nine people aboard.

== Cause ==
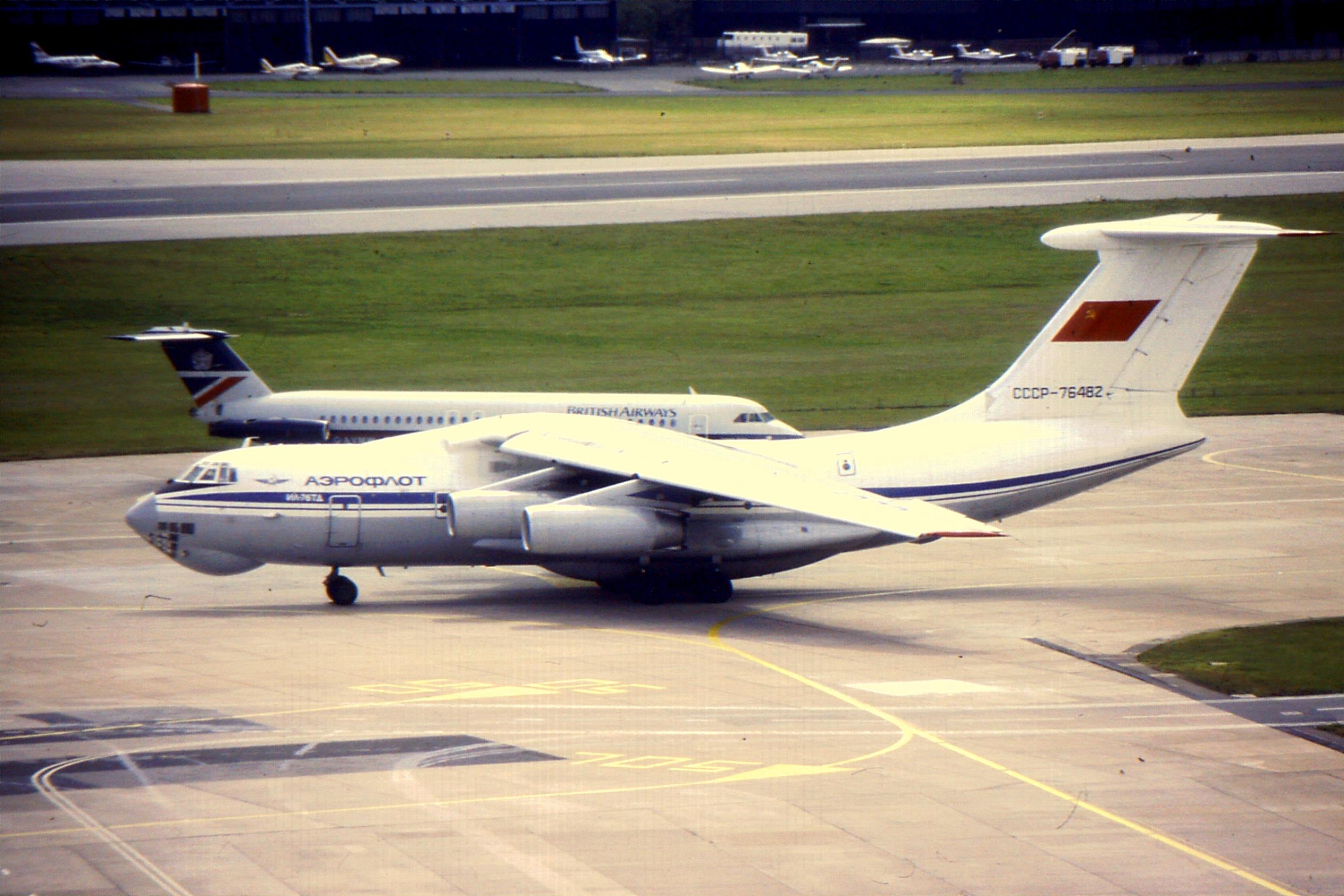
CCCP-76482, the aircraft that caused the wake turbulence.

The Yak-40 took off 66 seconds after an Ilyushin Il-76. When investigating the causes of the disaster the commission found that despite the IL-76's position it still would have left wake turbulence. The wind was only 1 mph, leading to the conclusion that the behavior of the Yak-40 can be explained only by hitting the wake turbulence of a much heavier Il-76 taking off from the same runway in just 75 seconds before the Yak-40. Tashkent Airport had a minimum takeoff interval of only one minute, regardless of aircraft type, leading to the relatively small Yak-40 quickly losing control and crashing upon encountering the wake vortex.

== See also ==
- Air Caribbean Flight 309
- Aeroflot accidents and incidents
- Aeroflot accidents and incidents in the 1980s
