= Yamalsky District =

Yamalsky District Ямальский район (Russian)
- District
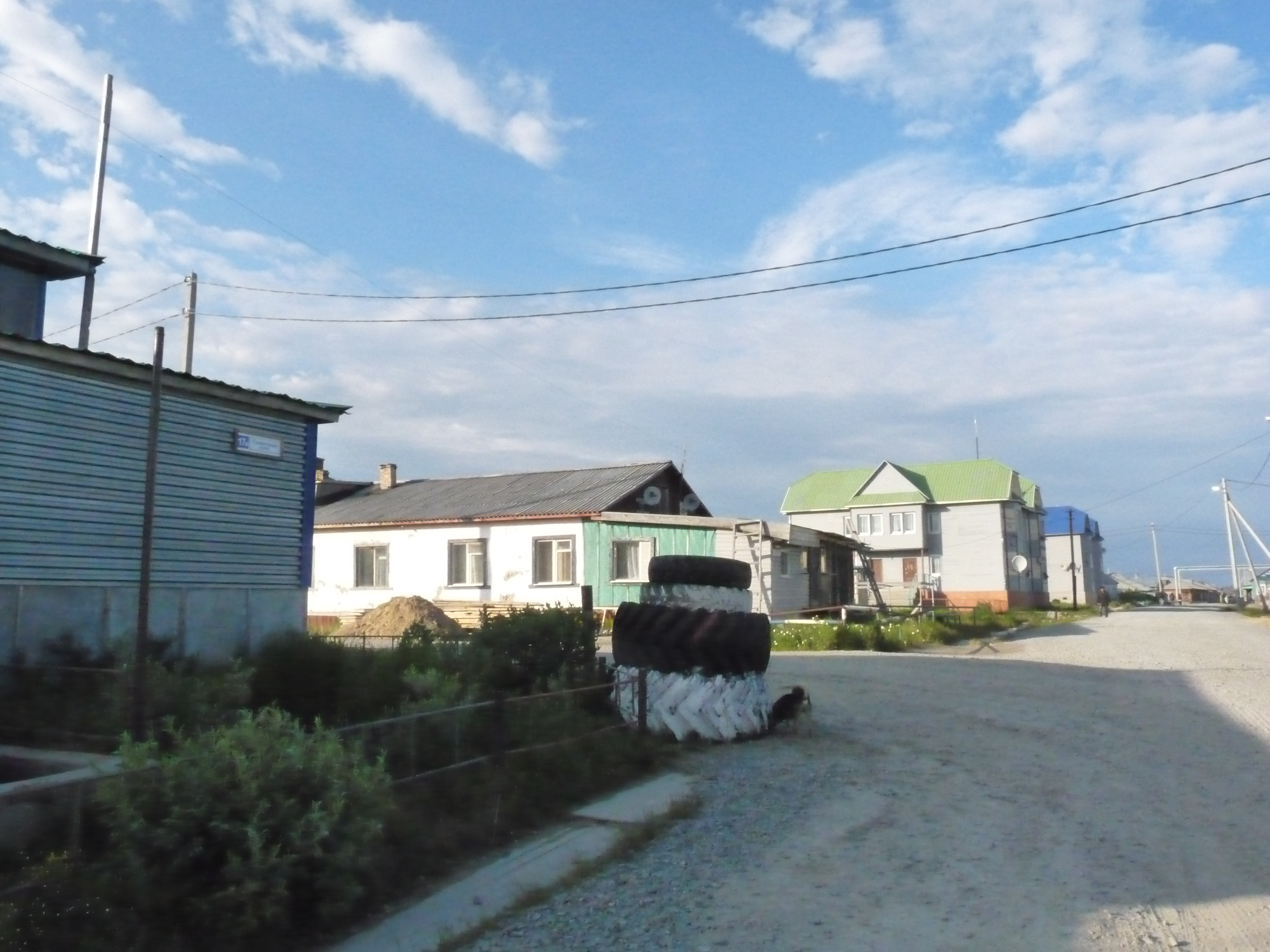
- Novy Port, Yamalsky District

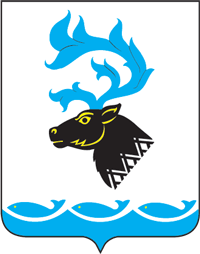
- Flag Coat of arms
- Location of Yamalsky District in Yamalo-Nenets Autonomous Okrug
- Coordinates: 66°51′48″N 70°49′48″E
- Country: Russia
- Federal subject: Yamalo-Nenets Autonomous Okrug
- Administrative center: Yar-Sale

Area
  - Total: 117,410 km^{2} (45,330 sq mi)

Population (2010 Census)
  - Total: 16,310
  - Density: 0.1389/km^{2} (0.3598/sq mi)
  - Urban: 0%
  - Rural: 100%

Administrative structure
  - Inhabited localities: 10 rural localities

Municipal structure
  - Municipally incorporated as: Yamalsky Municipal District
  - Municipal divisions: 0 urban settlements, 6 rural settlements
- Time zone: UTC+5 (MSK+2)
- OKTMO ID: 71928000
- Website: http://mo-yamal.ru/

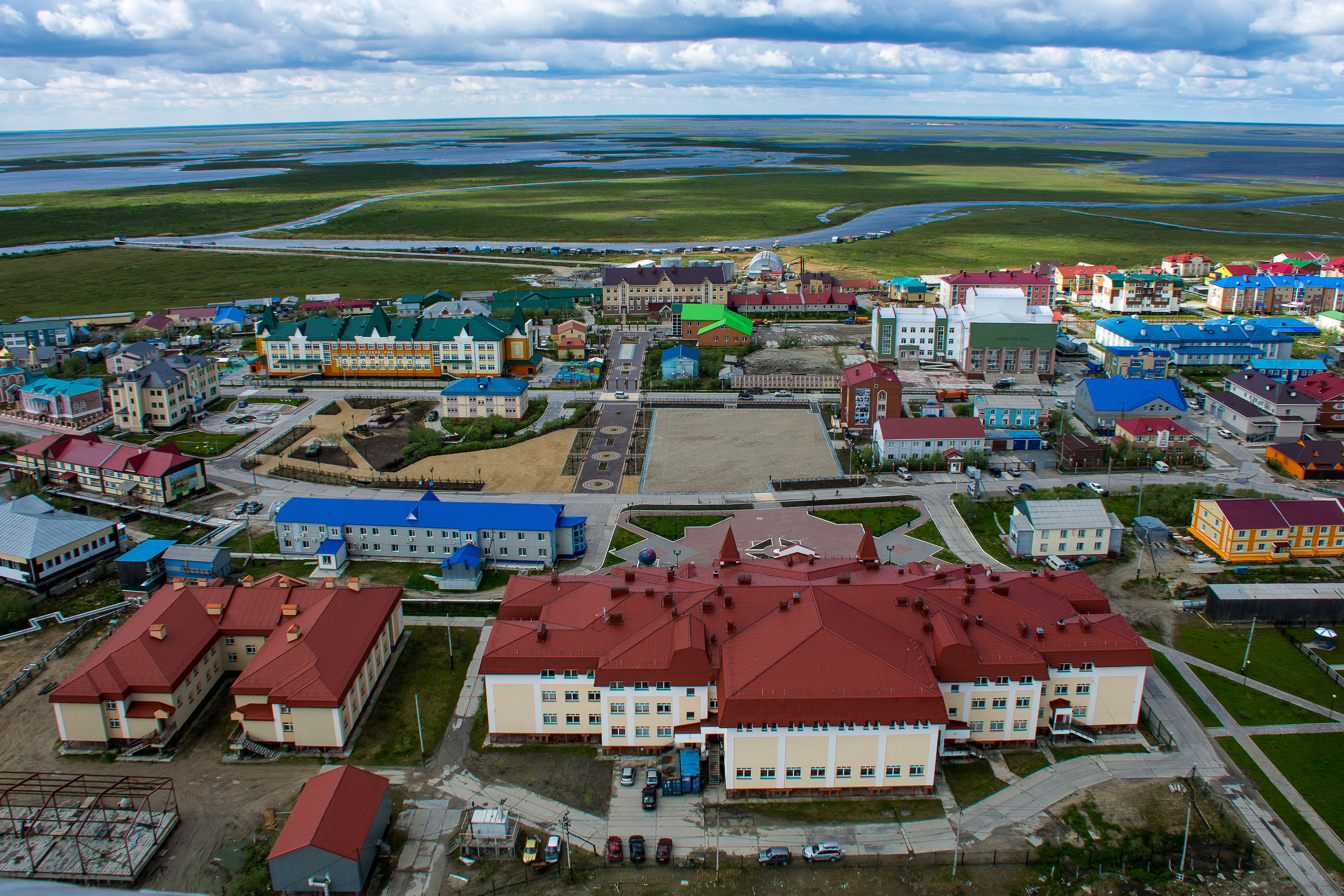
View of Yar-Sale

Yamalsky District (Russian: Яма́льский райо́н, Nenets: Я'мал район, Jaꜧmal rajon) is an administrative and municipal district (raion), one of the seven in Yamalo-Nenets Autonomous Okrug of Tyumen Oblast, Russia. It is located on the Yamal Peninsula in the north and northwest of the autonomous okrug. The area of the district is 117,410 square kilometers (45,330 sq mi). Its administrative center is the rural locality (a selo) of Yar-Sale. Population: 16,310 (2010 Census); 14,918 (2002 census); 15,029 (1989 Soviet census). The population of Yar-Sale accounts for 39.8% of the district's total population.

== Demographics ==
Ethnic composition (2021):

- Nenets – 72.6%
- Russians – 17.2%
- Khanty – 2.6%
- Tatars – 1.6%
- Others – 6%
