= Aeroflot Flight 5143 =

1985 plane crash in the north-central Uzbek SSR

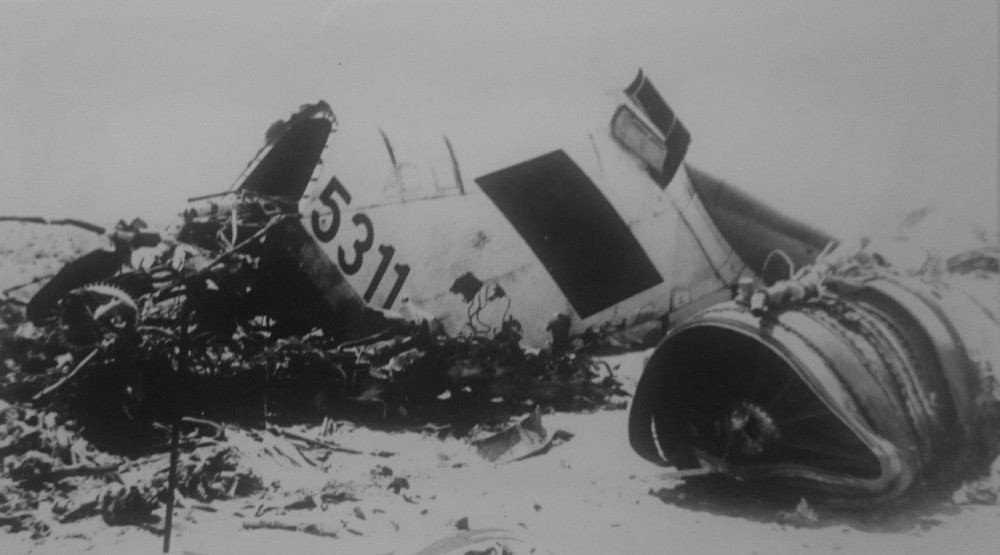
- Wreckage of the aircraft

Accident
- Date: 10 July 1985
- Summary: High-altitude stall, and crash
- Site: Kyzylkum Desert, near Uchquduq, Uzbek SSR; 42°14′23.4″N 64°10′15.4″E

Aircraft
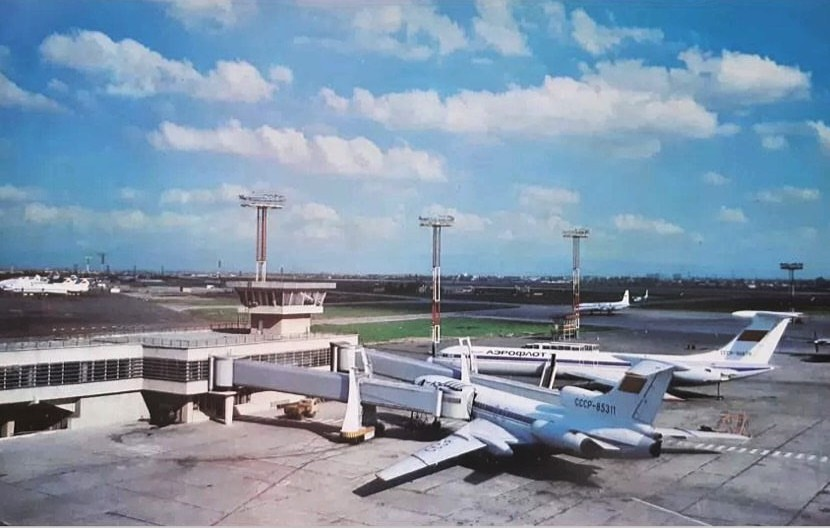
- The Aeroflot Tu-154B-2, involved in the accident
- Aircraft type: Tupolev Tu-154B-2
- Operator: Aeroflot (Tashkent Aviation Unit)
- IATA flight No.: SU5143
- ICAO flight No.: AFL5143
- Call sign: AEROFLOT 5143
- Registration: CCCP-85311
- Flight origin: Karshi Airport; Karshi, Uzbek SSR
- Stopover: Ufa Airport; Ufa, Russian SFSR
- Destination: Pulkovo Airport; Leningrad, Russian SFSR
- Occupants: 200
- Passengers: 191
- Crew: 9
- Fatalities: 200
- Survivors: 0

Aeroflot Flight 5143 was a scheduled domestic passenger flight between the Soviet cities of Karshi and Leningrad with a stopover in Ufa, operated by the Uzbek division of Aeroflot. On 10 July 1985, the Tupolev Tu-154 operating the flight crashed due to a high-altitude stall in the Kyzylkum Desert, near the city of Uchquduq. The crash resulted in the deaths of all 200 occupants onboard the flight, making it the deadliest accident in the Soviet Union and Uzbekistan, and the deadliest crash of a Tu-154.

== Aircraft ==
The Tu-154B-2 registration CCCP-85311 was manufactured at the Aviakor plant on 30 November 1978. On 2 January 1979, the aircraft was transferred to the Ministry of Civil Aviation, which was given to the Tashkent Aviation Unit of the Uzbek Civil Aviation Directorate. It was powered by three Kuznetsov NK-8U turbofan engines. At the time of the accident, the aircraft accumulated 12,443 flight hours and 5,660 flight cycles.

== Accident ==
The Tu-154 (CCCP-85311) was operating the first leg of the flight from Karshi to Ufa, piloted by the crew of the 219th flight squadron, consisting of commander O. P. Belisov (48), co-pilot A. T. Pozyumsky (48), flight engineer A. S. Mansurov (32), navigator G. N. Argeev (41), with 5 flight attendants onboard the flight. There were 191 passengers onboard the flight, which had consisted of 139 adults and 52 children, which met the standard regulations of 92.2 tonnes (203,000 lb). The aircraft took off at 23:00 PM, 4 hours behind the scheduled departure of 19:00; the temperature of Karshi Airport was 33 °C (91.4 °F). The Tu-154 climbed altitude, following the guidelines of the Aircraft Flight Manual (AFM).

The aircraft gained an altitude of 11,600 metres (38,000 ft) at a speed of 400 km/h (220 kn). The crew had changed the autopilot to gain speed, leading the aircraft to pitch down. The crew pulled the aircraft up, making the Tu-154 on the verge of activating the alarm of the critical angle of attack; suddenly, the alarm had stopped due to a blown fuse. The aircraft then entered the jet flow zone with a weight of 86.5 tonnes (191,000 lb); the air temperature of the specified flight path was 16.5 °C (29.5 °F) higher than the standard. The Tu-154 suddenly entered a critical angle of attack. This led to disruption in the airflow to the engines, leading to shaking; the flight engineer thought it was a compressor stall and ordered the crew to decrease the speed.

Instead of pushing back the throttle, they both decreased and increased the speed of the aircraft. The captain still continued to hold the altitude. The aircraft had then repeatedly had critical angles of attack; as a result, the engines failed, causing the aircraft’s speed to decrease 290 km/h (160 kn) after 1 minute and 17 seconds after the repeated angles of attack, leading the aircraft to lose control and enter a flat spin.

The crew contacted the dispatcher, stating that they were in a flat spin and had no power on the engines.

The aircraft remained in the spin for 2 minutes and 33 seconds, and at 23:46, it impacted the ground in a remote part of the Uchkuduk District, roughly 30 kilometres (20 mi) east of the small town of Kokpatas and 70 kilometres (40 mi) northeast of Uchkuduk itself. All 200 occupants were killed.

== Investigation ==
CCCP-85311's cockpit voice recorder was severely damaged by the impact. The Ministry of Civil Aviation had concluded the cause of the accident:

The cause of the disaster was the aircraft entering a flat spin at cruising altitude with a high flight mass, influenced by a high non-standard outside air temperature, a small angle of attack margin, and engine thrust. Under these flight conditions and the rapidly developing catastrophic situation, the crew made a number of deviations from the requirements of the Flight Operations Manual, lost speed, and was unable to control the aircraft.

The Ministry of Civil Aviation revealed that, during the proposal of the Tupolev Design Bureau and the State Research Institute of Civil Aviation, the flight weight of the Tu-154 was increased from 70 tonnes at an altitude of 12,500 meters to 86.5 tonnes for a flight level of 12,100 meters, without taking into account deviations in outside air temperatures from standard ones.

== In popular culture ==
- Vasily Vasilyevich Ershov mentioned the accident in a chapter in his book, Reflections of a Sled Dog.
- The accident was mentioned in Vladimir Chemguevich Mezokh's book, Features of Behaviour and Piloting of Main Passenger Aircraft in Critical Flight Modes.

== See also ==
- Aeroflot accidents and incidents
- Aeroflot accidents and incidents in the 1980s
