= 1981 Heiss Island Il-14 crash =

1981 aviation accident

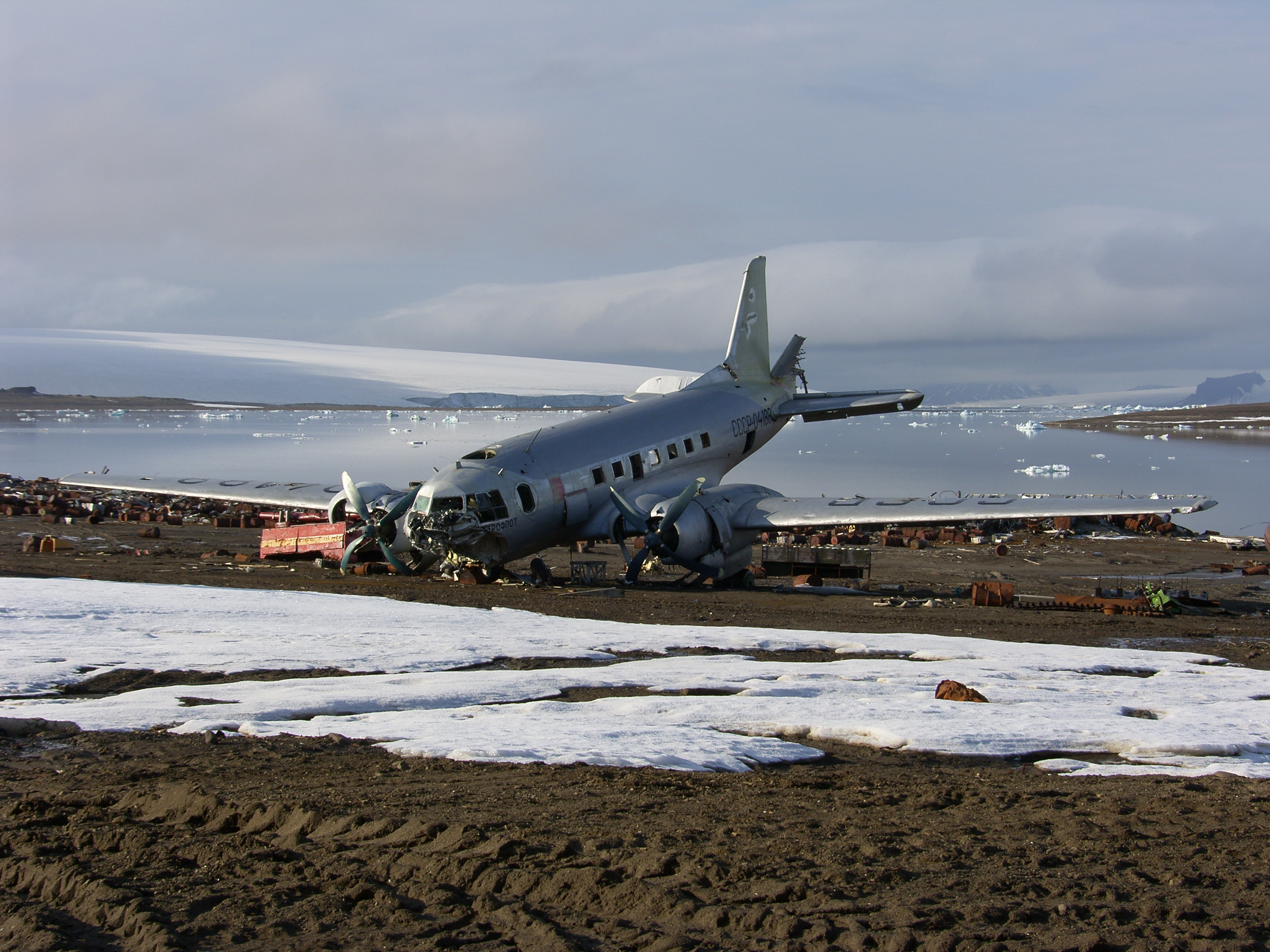
- The wrecked aircraft in September 2007

Accident
- Date: February 12, 1981
- Summary: Controlled flight into terrain during approach in poor visibility
- Site: Heiss Island, Franz Josef Land, Soviet Union; 80°34′50.67″N 57°40′41.6″E

Aircraft
- Aircraft type: Ilyushin Il-14
- Operator: Aeroflot (Central Directorate, Myachkovo Aviation Detachment)
- Registration: CCCP-04188
- Flight origin: Myachkovo Airport, Moscow
- 1st stopover: Sredny Island, Severnaya Zemlya
- Destination: Heiss Island, Franz Josef Land
- Passengers: 7
- Crew: 6
- Fatalities: 2
- Injuries: 9
- Survivors: 11

The 1981 Heiss Island Il-14 crash was an aviation accident that occurred on 12 February 1981, when an Ilyushin Il-14 aircraft crashed on Heiss Island, part of the Franz Josef Land archipelago in the Soviet Union. The aircraft was operating a special flight carrying meteorological personnel and equipment. Two of the thirteen people on board were killed.

The aircraft wreckage has never been moved and is still in place serving as an outdoor exhibit.

== Aircraft ==
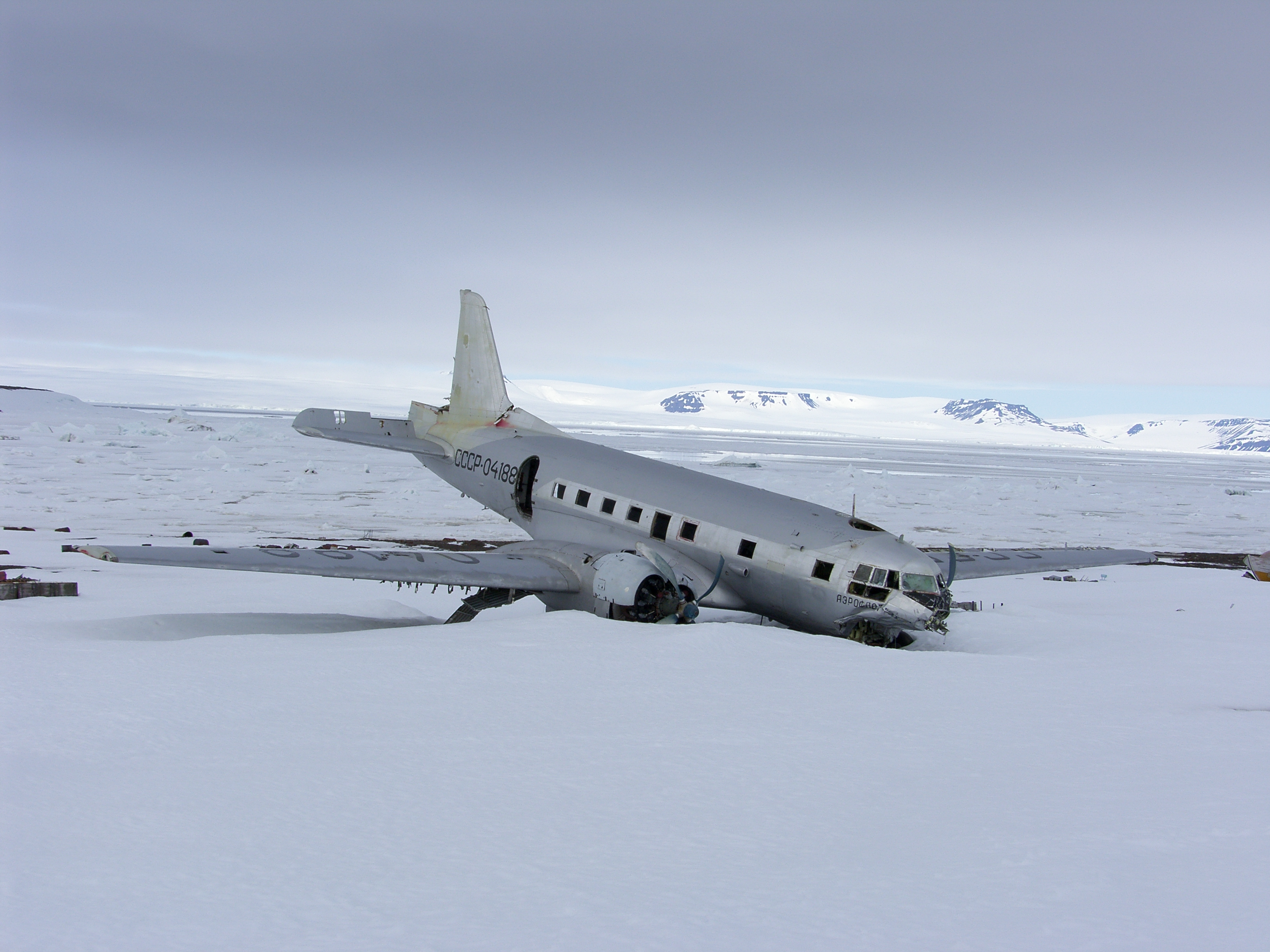
Alternate view of the wrecked aircraft (2007)

The aircraft was an Il-14T (according to other sources, Il-14P), registration CCCP-04188 (manufacturer number 6341301, serial number 13-01), built by the Tashkent Aviation Production Association on 17 April 1956. It was initially assigned to the Soviet Civil Air Fleet and later transferred to the Polar Aviation Directorate. Since 21 November 1971, it had been operated by the Myachkovo Aviation Detachment. By the time of the crash, it had accumulated 27,926 flight hours and 11,225 landings.

== Accident ==
The flight originated in Moscow and was bound for Heiss Island, with several intermediate stops including Vorkuta, Dikson Airport, and finally Sredny Island in Severnaya Zemlya. Onboard were scientists from the Obninsk Meteorological Institute along with their equipment, destined for the Ernst Krenkel Observatory on Heiss Island.

Landing was attempted during polar twilight on a temporary snow-covered landing strip. The aircraft’s landing weight exceeded the limit by 700 kg. On final approach, the pilot twice lost visual contact with the runway lights but chose not to go around, violating Soviet civil aviation regulations (NPP GA-78 §8.6.13).

The aircraft touched down 32 meters left of the runway in deep unpacked snow. The nose landing gear collapsed, and the nose section struck the ground, partially breaking apart. A fuel tank and other cabin cargo shifted forward, killing two passengers and damaging the cockpit. Five crew members and four passengers were injured.

== Investigation ==
The investigation found that the crash was primarily caused by the pilot’s failure to abort the landing despite the lack of visual reference. This was a violation of standard procedures. Inadequate operational control in the 229th flight detachment was also cited.

The aircraft was written off by the Ministry of Civil Aviation on 10 April 1981.

== Aftermath ==
In 2014, cleanup operations began on Heiss Island. Authorities decided to leave the aircraft wreckage in place as an outdoor exhibit.

In a 2021 article by the Russian Geographical Society, the plane was called a “tragic monument” and “the most photographed site on the island.”
