= Aeroflot Flight 3324 =

Tupolev Tu-154 accident in 1980 without any fatalities

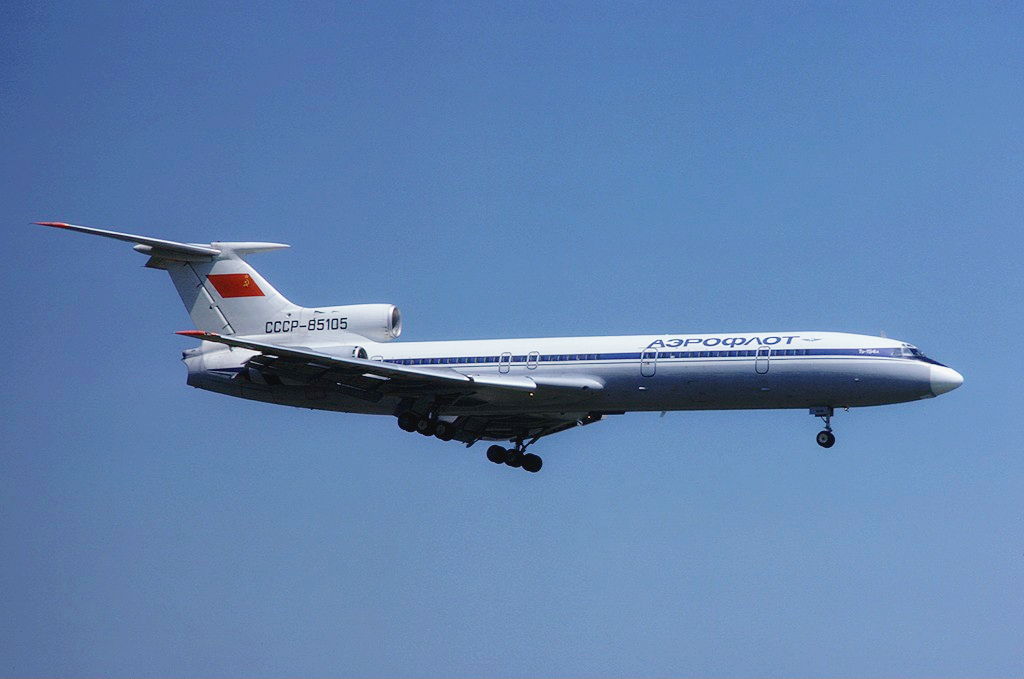
- An Aeroflot Tupolev Tu-154 similar to the one involved in the accident.

Accident
- Date: March 1, 1980
- Summary: Crashed on hard landing caused by pilot error
- Site: Orenburg Airport, Orenburg, USSR

Aircraft
- Aircraft type: Tupolev Tu-154A
- Operator: Aeroflot
- Registration: CCCP-85103
- Flight origin: Simferopol International Airport
- 1st stopover: Sochi International Airport
- Last stopover: Orenburg Airport
- Destination: Novosibirsk Tolmachevo Airport
- Occupants: 161
- Passengers: 152
- Crew: 9
- Fatalities: 0
- Injuries: 3
- Survivors: 161

Aeroflot Flight 3324 was a scheduled passenger flight within the Simferopol - Sochi - Orenburg - Novosibirsk route. On March 1, 1980, the Tupolev Tu-154 flying this route crashed due to a hard landing, causing the plane to split into two parts. Although the aircraft split in two, all 161 occupants survived, with only 3 occupants onboard only having injuries.

== Aircraft ==
The aircraft operating SU3324 was a Tupolev Tu-154A, with the serial number being 75A-103 and was registered CCCP-85103. Manufactured for Aeroflot in 1975, it had 6922 hours and 3075 flight cycles.

After the crash, the aircraft was written off, as it was destroyed.

== Crew ==
The crew had Nikolay Petrovich Karpov as the captain in command, First Officer Vasily Semenovich Soloviev (The controller of the aircraft), Flight Engineer Semyon Kuzmich Maltsev and Navigator Yuri Ivanovich Popov. There were also 5 flight attendants.

== Accident ==
The descent checklist was not followed by the flight crew. It had significantly caused the crew's work and lack of time complicated as it approached the airport.

The controller at Orenburg told the crew that they had to do their 4th turn, the crew started it later than expected. Due to the late turn, the aircraft was 1200 meters away from the correct direction of the course line of 11 km. The aircraft had suffered a loss of the flaps on the PNP for a failure in the system, which they didn't check the correction that the frequency settings on the control units made. The crew then continue the landing by using the actuators without telling the controller who was guiding SU3324. The controller then informed the flight twice about being to the right of the line. The crew entered it at a large exit angle. The crew violated AFM regulations, by banking 28° and having the flaps at 28°. The crew kept on violating the regulations whilst approaching. The navigator had not monitored the flaps' extension and the stabilizer being repositioned.

The crew failed to report to Orenburg tower that they were ready to land. After passing the outer marker, they still didn't report their readiness. The controller violated the regulations once again when they cleared the aircraft to land without any reports of the readiness of the flight.

The outer marker was passed higher then it was established. The crew then once violated regulations once again as they failed to go around, with the controller not requesting it. The aircraft made an effort to land, with the F/O increasing the rate of descent and reducing the engine speed to 30%.

The GPWS operated for 13 seconds, with the aircraft crossing the gilde path and going under it.

The captain then violated the AFM guidelines whilst 2.2 km away from the airport, which he extended the flaps to 45°, which should end at a distance of 1.6 km. The stabilizer remained at the same position. The crew hadn't monitored the additional flaps and stabilizer being repositioned.

SU3324, now at a distance of about 2 km, the tower told the crew that they were 25 meters below the path and in the violation of the MGA, again didn't give the command to go around, the crew continued the approach. The crew then increased the engine speed to 86%.

During the final approach to Orenburg Airport, the captain didn't give the command to land, with the F/O violating the regulations by not taking measures for a go around. The aircraft then dropped below the glide path and the crew had not issued an go around. The plane hit the ground, about 60m away from the threshold of 3g. The plane had then bounced and touched down at 3.9g, which caused the aircraft to break into 2. The plane then came to a rest in the middle of the runway.

== Investigation ==
The safety board then concluded the cause of the accident to be pilot error, within the findings of, violations of flight, wrong approach configuration, and failure to go around.

== See also ==
- FedEx Flight 80, a MD-11 that bounced during landing and crashed in Japan.
