= 1981 Zheleznogorsk mid-air collision =

1981 aviation accident

Accident
- Date: 18 September 1981
- Summary: Mid-air collision resulting from ATC error
- Site: 11 km (6.9 miles) east of Zheleznogorsk-Ilimskiy Airport, Soviet Union
- Total fatalities: 40
- Total survivors: 0

First aircraft
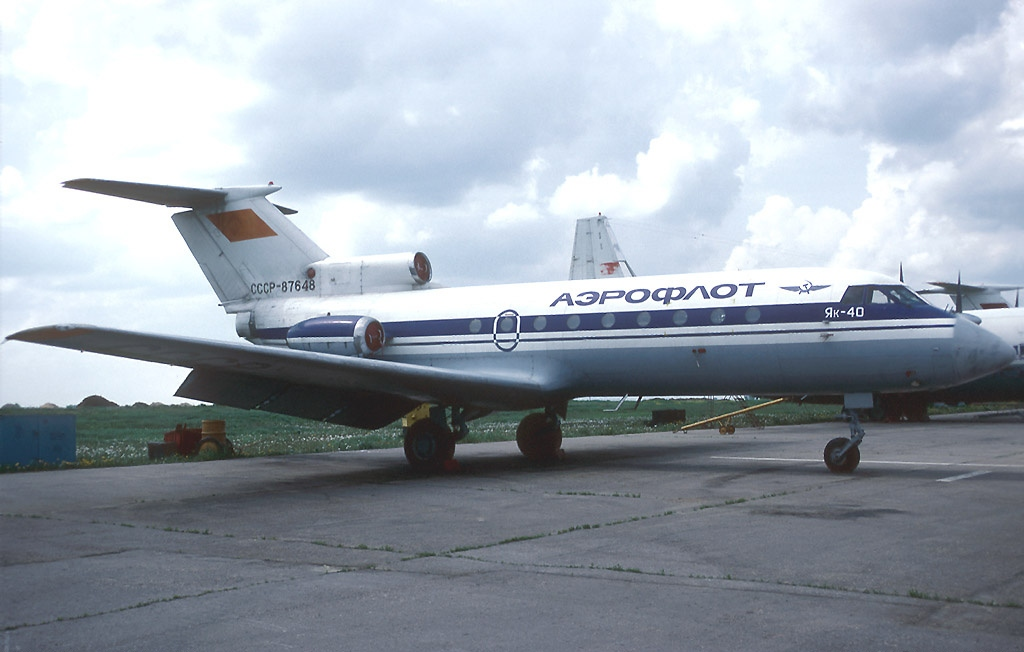
- An Aeroflot Yakovlev Yak-40, similar to the aircraft involved in the accident.
- Type: Yakovlev Yak-40
- Operator: Aeroflot
- Registration: CCCP-87455
- Flight origin: Irkutsk Airport (IKT/UIII), Soviet Union
- Destination: Zheleznogorsk-Ilimskiy Airport (UIBV), Soviet Union
- Passengers: 29
- Crew: 4
- Survivors: 0

Second aircraft
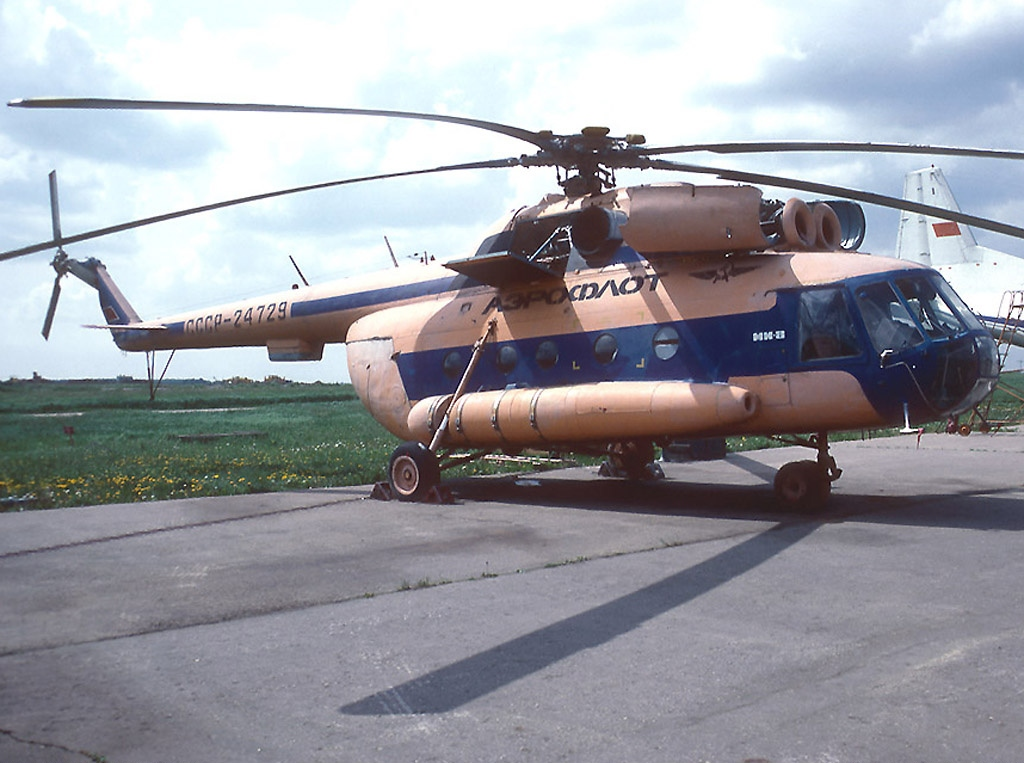
- An Aeroflot Mil Mi-8, similar to the aircraft involved in the accident.
- Type: Mil Mi-8T
- Operator: Aeroflot
- Registration: CCCP-22268
- Flight origin: Bratsk Airport (UIBB), Soviet Union
- Destination: Zheleznogorsk-Ilimskiy Airport (UIBV), Soviet Union
- Crew: 7
- Survivors: 0

The 1981 Zheleznogorsk mid-air collision was an accident involving a Yakovlev Yak-40 jet and a Mil Mi-8T helicopter, both operated by the Russian airline Aeroflot, 11 km (6.9 miles) east of Zheleznogorsk-Ilimskiy Airport, Soviet Union, on 18 September 1981. None of the combined 40 passengers and crew on either aircraft survived.

== Accident ==
While flight V-652 was inbound to Zheleznogorsk-Ilimskiy after its flight from Irkutsk on 18 September 1981, a Mil Mi-8T helicopter was also heading for the same airport after having finished its training flight from Bratsk. The crew of flight V-652 initiated their descent to the airport and had to pass through clouds while searching for the runway. When the plane was about 11 km (6.9 miles) East of the airport and at an altitude of 1,300 ft (396 m), it collided with the helicopter who was also descending at 7.13am. Flight V-652 suffered immense damage to its left wing, fuselage and tail section, while the helicopter's main rotor and cockpit were destroyed with serious damage to its fuselage as well. Both aircraft nosedived towards the ground following the collision, and crashed in a wooded hilly terrain 400 meters (1,300 feet) from one another. None of the 29 passengers and 4 crew aboard flight V-652 survived the crash, and all 7 crew on board the Mil Mi-8T helicopter also perished in the disaster.

== Aftermath ==
The wreckage of both aircraft were completely destroyed in the accident and post-crash fire. An investigation of the accident concluded that the cause lay with the poor surveillance conducted by ATC. The lack of communication between the three parties allowed the Mil Mi-8T helicopter to cross into the approach path of flight V-652.
