= Aeroflot Flight 7867 =

Aviation crash near Surgut Airport

- An Aeroflot Tupolev Tu-134, similar to the one involved

Accident
- Date: 27 February 1988
- Summary: Controlled flight into terrain due to pilot error
- Site: Surgut North Airport, Surgut, Russian SFSR; 61.344861°N 73.389333°E

Aircraft
- Aircraft type: Tupolev Tu-134AK
- Operator: Minsk Joint Stock Company (Aeroflot)
- Registration: CCCP-65675
- Flight origin: Minsk-2 International Airport, Minsk, Byelorussian SSR
- 1st stopover: Kuybyshev International Airport, Kuybyshev, Russian SFSR
- 2nd stopover: Roshchino International Airport, Tyumen, Russian SFSR
- Destination: Surgut North Airport, Surgut, Russian SFSR
- Occupants: 51
- Passengers: 45
- Crew: 6
- Fatalities: 20
- Injuries: 31
- Survivors: 31

Aeroflot Flight 7867 was a scheduled passenger flight from Minsk, Belarus to Surgut, SFSR, with stopovers in Kuybyshev, SFSR and Tyumen, SFSR. On February 27, 1988, the Tupolev Tu-134 crashed while on approach to Surgut Airport, killing 20 of the 51 occupants onboard.

== Background ==
=== Aircraft ===
The aircraft involved was a Tupolev Tu-134 manufactured in 1972 and registered CCCP-65675. Before the accident, the plane had accumulated 18,900 flight hours and 12,656 cycles.

=== Crew members ===
- Captain: Anatoly Mikhailovich Shavrovich
- Co-pilot: Vikenty Viktorovich Shuneiko
- Navigator: Valery Genrikhovich Zekhov
- Flight engineer: Vladimir Vladimirovich Yaroshevich
- Flight attendant: Valentina Malakhova
- Flight attendant: Alla Chernyak

== Accident ==
At 5:00 local time, the plane took off from Roshchino Airport in Tyumen, carrying 6 crew members and 45 passengers (including 2 minor). Half an hour after takeoff, at 5:35, the pilots heard weather information over the radio at Surgut airfield: -20°C, clear air with visibility of 8 kilometers, and a moderate wind at 6 m/s - decent for the landing.

At 5:47, as the crew started descending, the navigator found that the instrument landing system was inoperative. He was instructed that they will be using the radar data for the approach.

At 6:06, 3 kilometers from the runway threshold, the captain was distracted from his instruments and looked inside the cockpit, as the navigator failed to give the required command at that time. This cause the rate of descent to reduced from 4.6 m/s to 3 m/s

At the decision altitude, 100 meters (328 feet), the crew turned on their landing lights, but they were forced to turn them off due to the sudden encounter with haze. The navigator did not report reaching the decision altitude and the captain did not issue a go-around, so the plane was still descending without clear ground references. At an altitude of 38 meters (124 feet) and a speed of 286 km/h (154 knots), the flight overshot the runway threshold, 50 meters to the left of its intended course.

The plane was heading directly over the snow-covered ground. A second before the impact, the captain realized the problem and abort the landing, increased thrust and pull back the control column. However, the measures were taken too late. At 6:07, the plane struck the ground 714 meters from the end of the main runway and 113 meters to the left of its centerline. The airliner experienced a force acceleration of nearly five times its normal velocity, causing the right wing and tail to break off, and the engine to be torn off. It then flipped over and skidded over 300 meters before came to rest.

Initially, only the co-pilot died from impact; nonetheless, ignited kerosene penetrated the fuselage through breaches and ignited plastic cabin components, taking the lives of 17 more passengers and 2 flight attendants.

Firefighters and rescue services arrived at the scene within two minutes of the crash. Fifteen ambulances soon followed. Two hospitals were prepared to receive the injured. Doctors from Tyumen arrived to assist.

== Investigation ==
The investigation concluded that crew error was the primary cause.

- The captain was so distracted with the instrument that he did not abort the landing after the overshot.
- The co-pilot had failed make a go-around after receiving a verbal landing order from the captain, which was required in the flight manual
- The flight engineer failed to provide the crew with continuous altitude updates from an altitude of 70 meters.
- The navigator failed to announced the decision altitude (100 meters).

Additionally, the air traffic controller at the Surgut airprt was also found guilty of violating meteorological and radio-technical flight support regulations, causing the crew lost the ability to monitor the aircraft's position relative to the runway.

The Ministry of Civil Aviation was also blamed for the inability of determining the professional performance of the captain.

On December 5, 1989, the Supreme Court found the captain guilty of violating air traffic safety regulations, resulting in an air crash and fatalities. He was sentenced to six years' imprisonment.
