= Aeroflot Flight 3352 =

1984 plane crash in Omsk, Russia

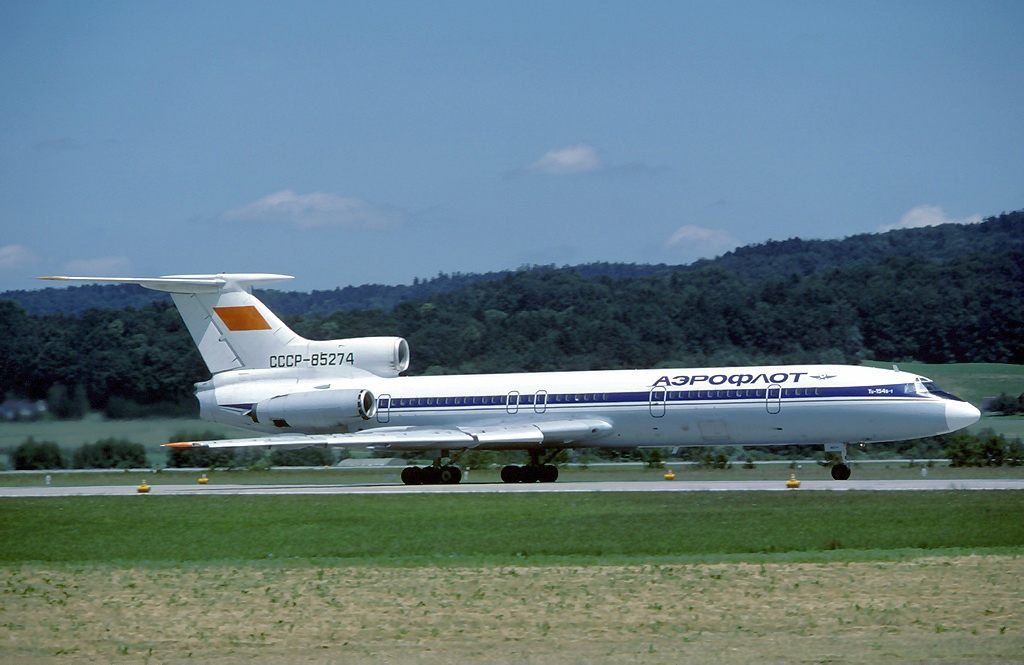
- An Aeroflot Tupolev Tu-154B-1, similar to the aircraft involved

Accident
- Date: 11 October 1984
- Summary: Collision with maintenance vehicles on landing due to ATC sleeping error
- Site: Omsk Airport, Omsk, Russian SFSR, Soviet Union; 54°58′00″N 73°18′30″E
- Total fatalities: 178

Aircraft
- Aircraft type: Tupolev Tu-154B-1
- Operator: Aeroflot
- IATA flight No.: SU3352
- ICAO flight No.: AFL3352
- Call sign: AEROFLOT 3352
- Registration: CCCP-85243
- Flight origin: Krasnodar International Airport, USSR
- Stopover: Omsk Airport, USSR
- Destination: Novosibirsk Tolmachevo Airport, USSR
- Occupants: 179
- Passengers: 170
- Crew: 9
- Fatalities: 174
- Injuries: 2
- Survivors: 5

Ground casualties
- Ground fatalities: 4

Aeroflot Flight 3352 was a regularly scheduled Aeroflot domestic flight in the Soviet Union from Krasnodar to Novosibirsk, with an intermediate landing in Omsk. While landing at Omsk Airport on Thursday, 11 October 1984, the Tupolev Tu-154 crashed into maintenance vehicles on the runway, killing 174 people on board and four on the ground. While a chain of mistakes in airport operations contributed to the accident, its major cause was an air traffic controller falling asleep on duty.

As of 2026, this remains the deadliest aviation accident on Russian territory. (Note: Korean Air Lines Flight 007, although crossing through Soviet Russian airspace and shot down by the Soviet Air Defense Forces, crashed in international waters near Sakhalin.) It was also the deadliest aviation accident involving a Tupolev Tu-154 at the time until the crash of Aeroflot Flight 5143 nine months later; as of 2026, it still ranks as the second-deadliest accident involving a Tupolev Tu-154. According to Komsomolskaya Pravda in 2017, the newspaper was the first to talk about the accident, as for 20 years, journalists had been silent.

== Background ==
The Tupolev Tu-154 B-1 was operated by Aeroflot (later becoming East Siberia). It was equipped with three Kuznetsov NK-8-2U engines, and first flew in 1977.

The flight carried 170 passengers, including eight teenagers and 16 young children; 2,700 kilograms (6,000 lb) of luggage, 306 kilograms (675 lb) of post, and 1,600 kilograms (3,500 lb) of cargo. The crew consisted of four cockpit members and five flight attendants. The 49-year-old captain Boris Petrovich Stepanov was highly experienced, with 16,365 hours in the air, including 4,303 hours of night flights and 1,846 hours on Tu-154. The first officer was 47-year-old Anatoly Yachmenev, who had 2,748 hours recorded on Tu-154. The remaining two cockpit crew members were flight engineer Vitaly Pronozin and navigator Yuri Blazhin.

The flight was approaching Omsk in poor weather: light rain, visibility 3 kilometres (1.9 mi; 1.6 nmi) with a 100-metre (330 ft) ceiling.

At the time it took place, the accident was the deadliest one in Soviet aviation history. It was surpassed on 10 July 1985 by Aeroflot Flight 5143, another Tu-154, which crashed in Uzbek SSR (modern day Uzbekistan), and killed 200 people.

== Accident ==
At 5 a.m. local time (UTC+07:00), Flight 3352 was preparing to land at Omsk Central Airport in southwestern Siberia, which has a population of over 1 million and is the administrative centre of Omsk Oblast. At the time, this was the only aircraft approaching Omsk, and it was cleared for landing when it contacted the airport.

At 5:20 a.m., worried that the continuing rain would make the runway overly slippery, the airport ground maintenance crew requested permission to dry the runway. The ground controller on duty, 23-year-old Andrey Borodaenko, gave permission and proceeded to fall asleep soon after, in the process forgetting to switch on the "runway occupied" warning. Under airport regulations, this procedure should never have happened; permission to close and do maintenance on a runway could only be given by the chief controller, who was absent.

The maintenance crew, following the airport's routine, moved three vehicles to the runway: a UAZ-469 all-terrain vehicle with an attached trailer, operated by a driver and crew manager in front; followed by KrAZ and Ural trucks. The latter were equipped with dry air compressors and loaded with fuel, and weighed 16–20 tons. The drying detail then proceeded to violate their own safety rules whilst performing their tasks: all of their vehicles should have had their top, flashing lights on continuously. However, the lights were too bright for the maintenance workers' liking, so they kept them on only until they started and after they finished their work.

This intentional oversight prevented the pilots from seeing the vehicles on the runway from their position. The runway crew saw the runway lights being turned on, but they were not instructed about the landing plane. They did attempt to contact ground control three times about the lights, but received no response and so ignored them, thinking the lights were being tested.

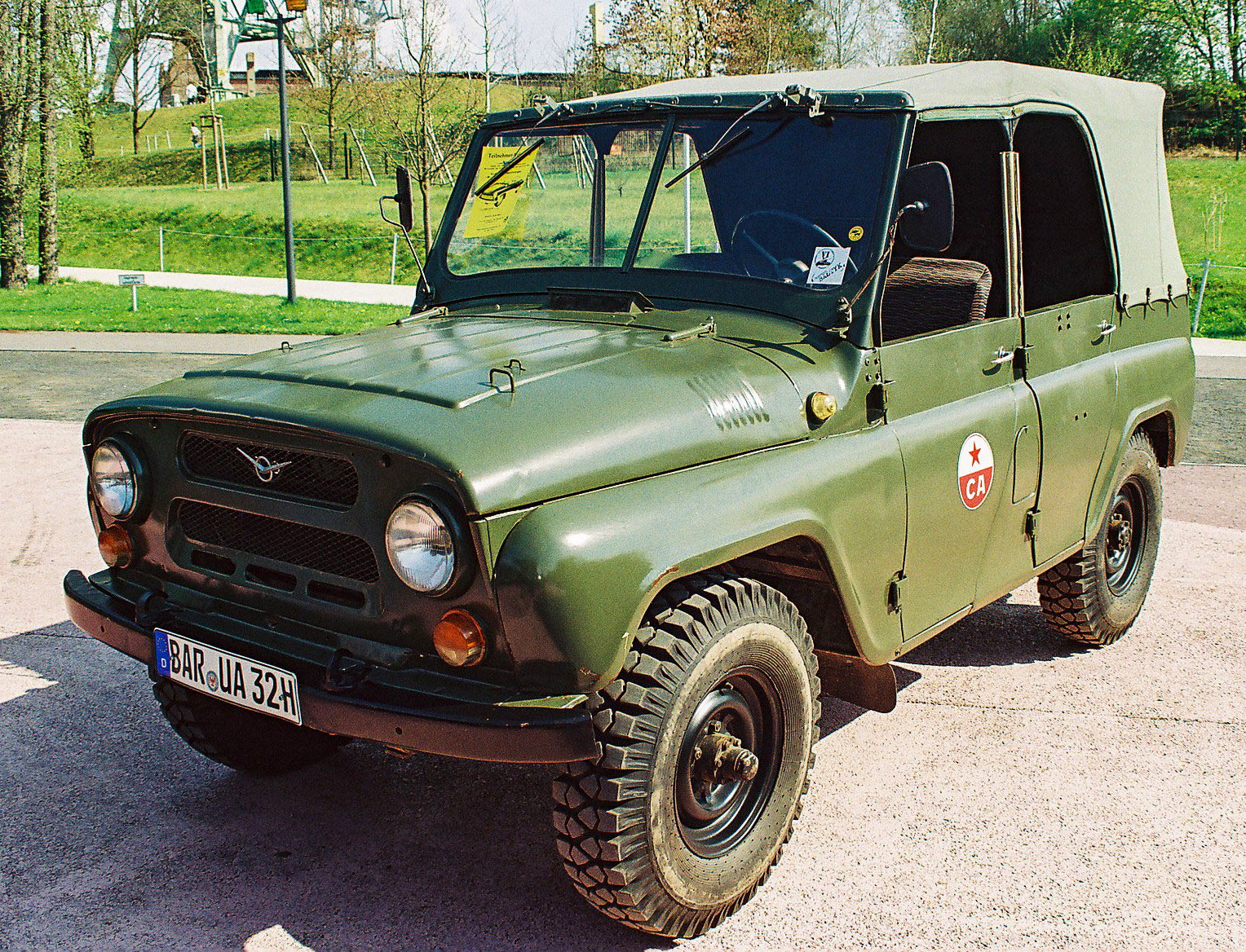
A UAZ-469 all-terrain vehicle

Around 5:36 a.m., Flight 3352 requested permission to land from the approach controller Vasily Ogorodnikov. The request was sent twice; the pilots noticed vague contours on the runway and wanted to double check for obstacles. Ogorodnikov verified the runway status, which remained apparently unoccupied, then attempted to contact the ground controller Borodaenko but received no response. He subsequently contacted the flight controller Boris Ishalov on internal radio and received an inaudible reply reported to sound like "[...]bodna", which was taken to mean "svobodna", meaning "free"; communications were being taped and were analyzed later. Ogorodnikov cleared the landing, despite being unable to see the runway while being required to keep the flight in the air until double-checking the runway's status. Both the ground controller and secondary controller should have been able to see the runway, but the former was asleep, and the latter was absent due to staff shortages.

At 5:38 a.m., the flight passed the decision height. The aircraft landed at a normal 240 km/h (130 kn; 150 mph). On touchdown, the flight crew saw the array of drying vehicles and attempted to turn the aircraft, but were unable to avoid the collision. The plane crashed into the Ural truck and then 200 metres (660 ft) down the runway crashed into the KrAZ, igniting the seven tons of fuel in each truck and the aircraft's fuel tank. The plane cart-wheeled and broke into pieces, some of which crashed into the UAZ-469. A catastrophic fracture of the fuel tanks caused burning fuel to leak into the fuselage, incinerating all but one passenger. The cockpit section detached and flew past the burning vehicles. It suffered no major damage, and all four crew members survived, with only the first officer sustaining minor injuries. They escaped from the cabin and ran to the crash site in an attempt to help the passengers. Only one of the aircraft's passengers, Anatoly Bordonosov, survived. He lost his right leg in the accident and as of 2015 was living in Yurga, Kemerovo Oblast. Four ground maintenance crew were killed instantly inside the vehicles. One person in the passenger seat of the UAZ (which caught fire, but was extinguished) survived.

Captain Stepanov returned to service after the crash and continued to fly for eight further years until he retired. He then appeared several times as an aviation expert in Russian media. He died on 14 November 2016. Decades after the crash, Stepanov said: "The very understanding that I survived came much later that day. It was more difficult to survive the feeling that you stayed alive, and more than 170 people behind you — no ... After the tragedy, every year on October 11, I called up flight engineer Vitaly Pronozin, and we always said to each other: "Happy birthday."

== Investigation ==
A state investigation concluded that the accident was caused by a chain of mistakes owing to the negligence of air traffic controllers, as well as violations of basic airport maintenance and safety regulations. The ground controller Borodaenko was found directly responsible, as he fell asleep on the job and thus did not respond to emergency queries; he also allowed the service trucks to move onto the runway and did not mark the runway as occupied. At a hearing he could not recollect his actions during the time in question, but did not deny the charges. He was sentenced to 15 years and died by suicide in prison. In addition, the flight operations manager Boris Ishalov was also sentenced to 15 years in prison, the approach controller Vasily Ogorodnikov to 13 years, and the head of airport maintenance Mikhail Tokarev to 12 years. All three appealed their sentences, to no avail. Subsequent inspections at numerous other Soviet airports also found similar types and numbers of violations of safety regulations, resulting in the dismissal of several high-level officials thereafter.

No pilot error or aircraft deficiency was found. The plane's weight and balance were within its defined norms. Due to poor visibility, the crew could not detect the obstructions on the runway. While they did have some reasonable doubts as to whether or not the runway was occupied, these were allayed by the approach controller's reassurances. The crew had only a few seconds to avoid the collision on the ground; they took evasive action, but could not possibly have saved the aircraft. They were thus absolved of any blame.

The flight and approach controllers were experienced professionals with at least 10 years of service. The 23-year-old ground controller on duty was inexperienced. He supposedly had not had enough sleep in the days before the accident, having had to care for his two young children.

The formal hearing of the case occurred only three months after the accident, due to the obvious set of circumstances; most of that time was spent on identifying the victims and locating their relatives. All of the accused, as well as their attorneys, received threats and were moved to the hearings under heavy security.

== See also ==
- Western Airlines Flight 2605
- Singapore Airlines Flight 006
- LATAM Airlines Perú Flight 2213
- Ozark Air Lines Flight 650
