= Lazurnoye =

Lazurnoye Лазурное
- Selo
- Location within Belgorod Oblast Location within Russia
- Coordinates: 50°29′N 38°03′E
- Country: Russia
- Region: Belgorod Oblast
- District: Volokonovsky District
- Time zone: UTC+3:00

Lazurnoye (Russian: Лазурное) is a rural locality (a selo) in Volokonovsky District, Belgorod Oblast, Russia. The population was 85 as of 2010. There are 2 streets.

== Geography ==
Lazurnoye is located 21 km east of Volokonovka (the district's administrative centre) by road. Pokrovka is the nearest rural locality.
