= Aeroflot Flight 3603 =

1981 aviation accident

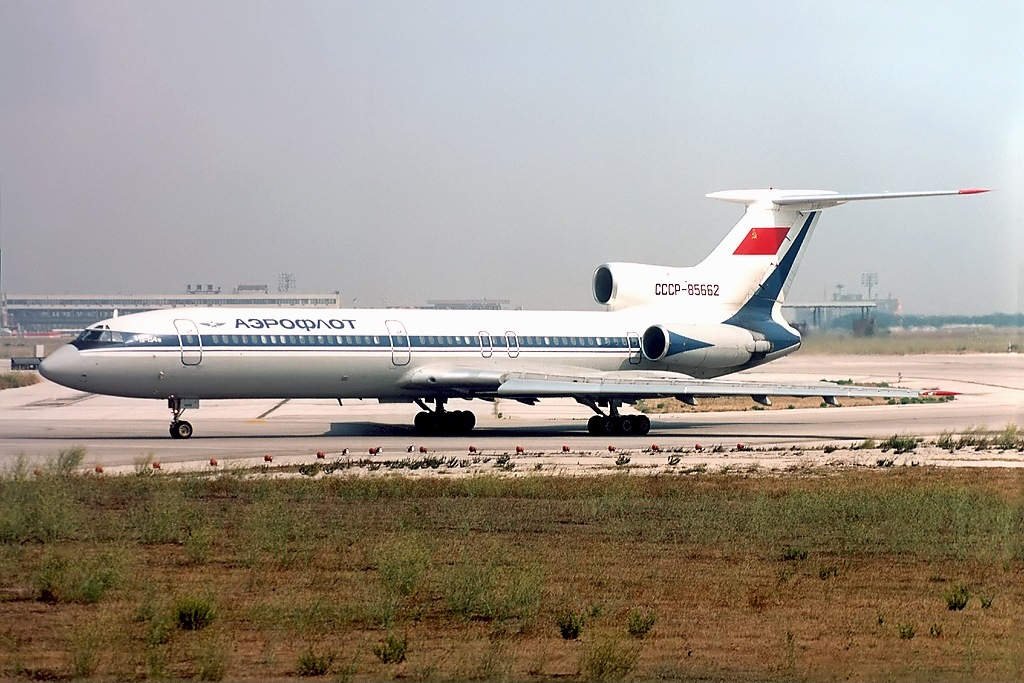
- An Aeroflot Tupolev Tu-154 similar to the one that crashed

Accident
- Date: 17 November 1981
- Summary: Controlled flight into terrain due to misalignment and design flaws
- Site: Noril'sk Airport, Noril'sk, Russian Soviet Federative Socialist Republic, Soviet Union; 69°17′37.68″N 87°18′2.52″E

Aircraft
- Aircraft type: Tupolev Tu-154B-2
- Operator: Aeroflot
- Registration: CCCP-85480
- Flight origin: Krasnoyarsk Airport
- Destination: Noril'sk Airport
- Occupants: 167
- Passengers: 160
- Crew: 7
- Fatalities: 99
- Survivors: 68

Aeroflot Flight 3603 was a scheduled domestic passenger flight from Kraysnoyarsk Airport in Krasnoyarsk, Soviet Union, to Noril'sk Airport in Noril'sk, Soviet Union. On November 17, 1981, the Tupolev Tu-154 flying this route crashed while attempting to land at Noril'sk Airport. Of the 167 passengers and crew on board, 99 were killed in the accident.

== Accident ==
It was dark and there was a low overcast with a cloud base of around 400 feet (120 m) when the Tupolev Tu-154 began its approach to Noril'sk Airport. The aircraft was about 5,000 pounds (2,300 kg) above its calculated weight and its center of gravity was beyond the forward limit for the type. The nose heavy condition caused Flight 3603 to descend below the glide path as it made its final approach. The Captain initiated a go-around maneuver, but the aeroplane impacted terrain approximately 1,500 feet (460 m) short of the runway, striking a mound in an open field and sliding across the frozen ground for about 300 m. Four crew members and 95 passengers were killed in the accident.

== Investigation ==
According to the commission, the crew had no reason to stop the approach 9 seconds before the collision, and deflecting the elevator all the way to pitch up was an attempt to reduce the vertical speed and hold the plane on the glide path. Only at a speed of 261–263 km/h, when the longitudinal control of the aircraft was lost and the centering was close to the front, did the crew decide to go around. As for aircraft alignment, after interviews with alignment controllers and loaders at the Krasnoyarsk airport, as well as flight attendants, it was determined that during landing it was 20.5-19% of the mean aerodynamic chord (MAC), and according to balancing characteristics 16-18% MAC. According to the investigative commission, the transportation service at Krasnoyarsk airport committed the following violations:

- The nominal load was calculated based on the standard weight of one adult passenger and a child of 75 75 kilograms (165 lb), and not 80 kilograms (180 lb) and 30 kilograms (66 lb), respectively, as a result of which the actual weight was 565 kilograms (1,246 lb) more than that indicated in the transportation documents.
- Four passengers were not issued coupons for free transportation of children, which is why there were 6 unaccounted small children on board, thereby increasing the actual weight relative to that indicated in the documents by another 120 kilograms (260 lb).

=== Aircraft design flaws ===
Even during flight tests of Tu-154B aircraft in 1974-1975, a significant decrease in the elevator margin was revealed, compared to the first Tu-154 (USSR-85001), which passed state tests. This decrease was 4-6%, which corresponds to a forward shift of the alignment by 4-6% of the MAC, while Tupolev did not provide any official explanation for this fact. Based on the test results, the front centering limit was changed from 18 to 16.5% of the MAC, but this did not compensate for the decrease in the longitudinal control margin and was insufficient for safe operation. The Norilsk plane crash led to the need to conduct tests, according to the results of which the State Research Institute of Civil Aviation established that the minimum level of longitudinal controllability in the established modes can be ensured only with an alignment of 22% of the MAC or more, or with an alignment of 20% of the MAC, but subject to an increase in the approach speed landing by 10 km/h, compared to that recommended in the Aircraft flight manual. The same tests confirmed a sharp decrease in the efficiency of the elevator when it is deflected by more than −20°, while during flights with alignments less than 20% of the MAC its balancing position is already close to the zone of low efficiency. When the elevator was deflected by more than 18° during a dive or pitch-up, the aircraft reacted slowly, especially to pitch-up (taking the helm "over"). Tests also showed that the longitudinal control characteristics of the aircraft strongly depend on the operating mode of the engines. At the same time, there was no indicator for maximum permissible elevator deviations in the cockpit, and the flight manual contained incorrect recommendations for using a wide zone (from −3° to −16°) on the stabilizer position indicator (IP-33), thereby making it difficult for crews to determine the critical position of the rudder in flight. There were no clear recommendations in the Flight Manual on the use of the IP-33 device when the elevator needle goes beyond the wide part of the green sector. Despite the results of flight tests in 1974-1975 and 1979, which revealed design flaws in the Tu-154B aircraft, the rush to introduce and start operating new models led to the fact that the Tupolev Design Bureau did not take any constructive measures to increase the longitudinal control margin airliner, and the leadership of the State Research Institute of Civil Aviation simply did not control this moment.

=== Conclusion of the commission ===
The cause of the disaster is the loss of longitudinal control of the aircraft at the final stage of landing due to:

- a significant reduction in the effectiveness of the elevator when it is deflected "towards itself" at angles of more than (−20°);
- transfer of engines by automatic traction to a mode close to low throttle;
- forward operational alignment position of the aircraft;
- late recognition by the crew of an emergency situation and, in connection with this, untimely decision to make a go-around.
