= List of airline codes (R) =

This is a list of all airline codes. The table lists the IATA airline designators, the ICAO airline designators and the airline call signs (telephony designator). Historical assignments are also included for completeness.

== Codes ==
Airline codes
| IATA | ICAO | Airline | Call sign | Country | Comments |
|---|---|---|---|---|---|
| | RBB | Rabbit-Air | RABBIT | Switzerland | |
| | ACE | Race Cargo Airlines | Fastcargo | Ghana | defunct |
| R6 | | RACSA | | Guatemala | |
| | GBR | Rader Aviation | GREENBRIER AIR | United States | |
| 1D | | Radixx | | United States | |
| | BKH | RAF Barkston Heath | | United Kingdom | |
| | CFN | RAF Church Fenton | CHURCH FENTON | United Kingdom | Church Fenton Flying Training Unit |
| | COH | RAF Coltishall | COLT | United Kingdom | Coltishall Flying Training Unit |
| | CBY | RAF Coningsby | TYPHOON | United Kingdom | Coningsby Flying Training Unit |
| | COT | RAF Cottesmore | COTTESMORE | United Kingdom | Royal Air Force (Cottesmore Flying Training Unit) - No longer allocated |
| | CWL | RAF Cranwell | CRANWELL | United Kingdom | Royal Air Force (Cranwell Flying Training Unit) |
| | KIN | RAF Kinloss | KINLOSS | United Kingdom | Royal Air Force (Kinloss Flying Training Unit) |
| | LEE | RAF Leeming | JAVELIN | United Kingdom | Royal Air Force (Leeming Flying Training Unit) |
| | LCS | RAF Leuchars | LEUCHARS | United Kingdom | Royal Air Force |
| | LOP | RAF Linton-on-Ouse | LINTON ON OUSE | United Kingdom | Royal Air Force (Linton-on-Ouse Flying Training Unit) |
| | LOS | RAF Lossiemouth | LOSSIE | United Kingdom | Royal Air Force (Lossiemouth Flying Training Unit) |
| | MRH | RAF Marham | MARHAM | United Kingdom | Royal Air Force (Marham Flying Training Unit) |
| | NWO | RAF Northwood | | United Kingdom | Royal Air Force (Northwood Headquarters) |
| | SMZ | RAF Scampton | SCAMPTON | United Kingdom | Royal Air Force |
| | STN | RAF St Athan | SAINT ATHAN | United Kingdom | Royal Air Force |
| | SMG | RAF St Mawgan Search and Rescue | | United Kingdom | Royal Air Force |
| | TOF | RAF Topcliffe Flying Training Unit | TOPCLIFFE | United Kingdom | Royal Air Force |
| | VYT | RAF Valley Flying Training Unit | ANGLESEY | United Kingdom | Royal Air Force |
| | VLL | RAF Valley SAR Training Unit | | United Kingdom | Royal Air Force |
| | WAD | RAF Waddington | VULCAN | United Kingdom | Royal Air Force (Waddington FTU) |
| | WIT | RAF Wittering | STRIKER | United Kingdom | Royal Air Force (Wittering FTU) |
| | MTL | RAF-Avia | MITAVIA | Latvia | |
| | WES | Rainbow International Airlines | WEST INDIAN | United States | |
| | RJT | RA Jet Aeroservicios | RA JET | Mexico | |
| | RAJ | Raji Airlines | RAJI | Pakistan | |
| | RKM | RAK Airways | RAKAIR | United Arab Emirates | |
| | RFA | Raleigh Flying Service | RALEIGH SERVICE | United States | |
| | REX | Ram Air Freight | RAM EXPRESS | United States | |
| | RMT | Ram Aircraft Corporation | RAM FLIGHT | United States | |
| | PPK | Ramp 66 | PELICAN | United States | |
| | RGM | Rangemile Limited | RANGEMILE | United Kingdom | |
| | MWR | Raslan Air Service | RASLAN | Egypt | |
| | RAQ | Rath Aviation | RATH AVIATION | Austria | |
| | CSM | Ratkhan Air | LORRY | Kazakhstan | |
| | RVR | Raven Air | RAVEN | United Kingdom | |
| | RVN | Raven Air | RAVEN U-S | United States | Qualiflight Training |
| 7H | RVF | Ravn Alaska | RAVEN FLIGHT | United States | 2014 |
| | REI | Ray Aviation | RAY AVIATION | Israel | |
| | RYT | Raya Jet | | Jordan | |
| | RTN | Raytheon Aircraft Company | RAYTHEON | United States | |
| | RCJ | Raytheon Corporate Jets | NEWPIN | United Kingdom | |
| | KSS | Raytheon Travel Air | KANSAS | United States | |
| | RCB | Real Aero Club De Baleares | BALEARES | Spain | |
| | CDT | Real Aero Club de Reus-Costa Dorado | AEROREUS | Spain | |
| | RCD | Real Aeroclub De Tenerife | AEROCLUB | Spain | |
| | VCB | Real Aero Club de Vizcaya | | Spain | |
| | RLV | Real Aviation | REAL | Ghana | |
| XW | LUV | Really Cool Airlines | REALLY COOL AIRLINE | Thailand | |
| | RCB | Real Aero Club De Baleares | BALEARES | Spain | |
| REB | Rebus | REBUS | Bulgaria | | |
| | RTO | Rectimo Air Transports | RACCOON | France | |
| | RIX | Rectrix Aviation | RECTRIX | United States | |
| | PSH | Red Aviation | PASSION | United Kingdom | (Helidrome Limited) |
| | RBN | Red Baron Aviation | RED BARON | United States | |
| | DEV | Red Devils Parachute Display Team | RED DEVILS | United Kingdom | |
| | RDV | Red Sea Aviation | RED AVIATION | Egypt | |
| | RSV | Red Sky Ventures | RED SKY | Namibia | |
| | STR | Red Star | STARLINE | United Arab Emirates | |
| | RHC | Redhill Aviation | REDAIR | United Kingdom | |
| | VRD | Virgin America | REDWOOD | United States | |
| | RAV | Reed Aviation | REED AVIATION | United Kingdom | |
| | REF | Reef Air | REEF AIR | New Zealand | |
| V4 | REK | Reem Air | REEM AIR | Kyrgyzstan | |
| | RVV | Reeve Aleutian Airways | REEVE | United States | defunct |
| | RBH | Regal Bahamas International Airways | CALYPSO | Bahamas | |
| | RGY | Regency Airlines | REGENCY | United States | |
| | RAH | Regent Air | REGENT | Canada | |
| RX | RGE | Regent Airways | REGENT | Bangladesh | defunct; code reassigned to Riyadh Air |
| | RAG | Regio Air | GERMAN LINK | Germany | |
| | RGR | Region Air | REGIONAIR | Canada | |
| YS | RAE | Régional | REGIONAL EUROPE | France | |
| | TSH | R1 Airlines, previously Regional 1 | TRANSCANADA | Canada | |
| | RIL | Regional Air | | Mauritania | |
| | REW | Regional Air Express | REGIONAL WINGS | Germany | |
| | REG | Regional Air Services | REGIONAL SERVICES | Tanzania | |
| FN | RGL | Regional Air Lines | MAROC REGIONAL | Morocco | |
| ZL | RXA | Rex Airlines | REX | Australia | |
| | JJM | Regional Geodata Air | GEODATA | Spain | |
| P7 | REP | Regional Paraguaya | REGIOPAR | Paraguay | Defunct |
| 3C | CEA | RegionsAir | CORP-X | United States | formerly Corporate Airlines |
| | REL | Reliance Aviation | RELIANCE AIR | United States | |
| | RLI | Reliant Air | RELIANT | United States | |
| | RTS | Relief Transport Services | RELIEF | United Kingdom | |
| | RAN | Renan | RENAN | Moldova | |
| QQ | ROA | Reno Air | RENO AIR | United States | defunct |
| | RGS | Renown Aviation | RENOWN | United States | |
| RC | REP | Republic Airlines | REPUBLIC | United States | defunct; 1979–1986, merged with Northwest Airlines |
| YX | RPA | Republic Airways | BRICKYARD | United States | |
| RH | RPH | Republic Express Airlines | PUBLIC EXPRESS | Indonesia | |
| | RBC | Republicair | REPUBLICAIR | Mexico | |
| | RST | Resort Air | RESORT AIR | United States | |
| | RUT | Reut Airways | YADID | Israel | |
| | RGV | RG Aviation | | Venezuela | 2014 |
| | RDS | Rhoades Aviation | RHOADES EXPRESS | United States | |
| | RIU | Riau Airlines | RIAU AIR | Indonesia | |
| | RIA | Rich International Airways | RICHAIR | United States | |
| | RVC | Richards Aviation | RIVER CITY | United States | |
| | RIC | Richardson's Airway | RICHARDSON | United States | |
| | RCA | Richland Aviation | RICHLAND | United States | |
| | WHH | Richy Skylark | | Sri Lanka | 2014 |
| | HPR | Rick Lucas Helicopters | HELIPRO | New Zealand | |
| C7 | RLE | Rico Linhas Aéreas | RICO | Brazil | |
| | RID | Ridder Avia | AKRID | Kazakhstan | |
| | RAK | Riga Airclub | SPORT CLUB | Latvia | |
| | RAZ | Rijnmond Air Services | RIJNMOND | Netherlands | |
| | POL | Rikspolisstyrelsen | | Sweden | |
| | RIM | Rimrock Airlines | RIMROCK | United States | |
| | SKA | Rio Air Express | RIO EXPRESS | Brazil | |
| | REO | Rio Airways | RIO | United States | |
| E2 | GRN | Rio Grande Air | GRANDE | United States | defunct |
| RL | RIO | Rio Linhas Aéreas | RIO | Brazil | |
| SL | RSL | Rio Sul Serviços Aéreos Regionais | RIO SUL | Brazil | defunct |
| | RVM | River Ministries Air Charter | RIVER | South Africa | |
| | RGP | River State Government of Nigeria | GARDEN CITY | Nigeria | |
| | UNR | Rivne Universal Avia | RIVNE UNIVERSAL | Ukraine | |
| RX | RXI | Riyadh Air | RIYADH AIR | Saudi Arabia | Launching in 2025 |
| | RDL | Roadair Lines | ROADAIR | Canada | |
| | RBT | Robinton Aero | ROBIN | Dominican Republic | |
| V2 | RBY | Vision Airlines | RUBY | United States | Charter Airline and Las Vegas Tours |
| | ROX | Roblex Aviation | ROBLEX | United States | |
| | RKW | Rockwell Collins Avionics | ROCKWELL | United States | |
| | ROC | Rocky Mountain Airlines | | Canada | |
| | RMA | Rocky Mountain Airways | ROCKY MOUNTAIN | United States | |
| | LIF | Rocky Mountain Holdings | LIFECARE | United States | |
| | RDZ | Rodze Air | RODZE AIR | Nigeria | |
| | FAD | Rog-Air | AIR FRONTIER | Canada | |
| | RRZ | Rollright Aviation | ROLLRIGHT | United Kingdom | |
| | RRL | Rolls-Royce Limited | MERLIN | United Kingdom | Military Aviation |
| | BTU | Rolls-Royce plc | ROLLS | United Kingdom | Rolls-Royce Bristol Engine Division |
| | ROF | Romanian Air Force | ROMAF | Romania | |
| | RMV | Romavia | AEROMAVIA | Romania | |
| | RNS | Ronso | RONSO | Mexico | |
| | ROR | Roraima Airways | RORAIMA | Guyana | |
| | KRS | Rosen Aviation | | Japan | 2014 |
| | RNB | Rosneft-Baltika | ROSBALT | Russia | |
| | NRG | Ross Aviation | ENERGY | United States | |
| | RFS | Rossair | | Australia | |
| | RSS | Rossair | ROSS CHARTER | South Africa | |
| | ROS | Rossair Europe | CATCHER | Netherlands | |
| FV | SDM | Rossiya | RUSSIA | Russia | Airline merged with Pulkovo Aviation Enterprise and renamed to Rossiya |
| | RAL | Roswell Airlines | ROSWELL | United States | |
| GZ | RAR | Air Rarotonga | AIR RAROTONGA | Cook Islands | |
| | RTR | Rotatur | ROTATUR | Brazil | |
| | RKT | Rotormotion | ROCKET | United Kingdom | |
| | JCR | Rotterdam Jet Center | ROTTERDAM JETCENTER | Netherlands | |
| | ROV | Rover Airways International | ROVERAIR | United States | |
| | VOS | Rovos Air | ROVOS | South Africa | |
| | RCG | Royal Air Cargo | ROYAL CARGO | South Africa | |
| RR | RFR | Royal Air Force | RAFAIR | United Kingdom | |
| RS | MJN | Royal Air Force of Oman | MAJAN | Oman | |
| | ACW | Royal Air Force | AIR CADET | United Kingdom | Air Cadet Schools |
| | RRR | Royal Air Force | ASCOT | United Kingdom | RAF HQSTC (Air Transport) |
| | RRF | Royal Air Force | KITTY | United Kingdom | RAF positioning flights |
| | SHF | Royal Air Force | VORTEX | United Kingdom | Support Helicopter Force |
| | RAX | Royal Air Freight | AIR ROYAL | United States | |
| AT | RAM | Royal Air Maroc | ROYALAIR MAROC | Morocco | |
| RW | RYL | Royal Air Philippines | DOUBLE GOLD | Philippines | |
| R0 | RPK | Royal Airlines | ROYAL PAKISTAN | Pakistan | |
| | RLM | Royal American Airways | ROYAL AMERICAN | United States | |
| V5 | RYL | Royal Aruban Airlines | ROYAL ARUBAN | Aruba | |
| | ASY | Royal Australian Air Force | AUSSIE | Australia | Used by RAAF units internationally |
| | RXP | Royal Aviation Express | ROY EXPRESS | Canada | |
| | RYB | Royal Bahrain Airlines | ROYAL BAHRAIN | Bahrain | |
| BI | RBA | Royal Brunei Airlines | BRUNEI | Brunei | |
| | KDR | Royal Daisy Airlines | DARLINES | Uganda | |
| | RGA | Royal Ghanaian Airlines | ROYAL GHANA | Ghana | |
| | ROJ | Royal Jet | ROYALJET | United Arab Emirates | |
| RJ | RJA | Royal Jordanian | JORDANIAN | Jordan | |
| | RJZ | Royal Jordanian Air Force | JORDAN AIR FORCE | Jordan | |
| RK | RCT | Skyview Airways | GREENSKY | THAILAND | 2014 |
| RK | RKH | Royal Khmer Airlines | KHMER AIR | Cambodia | |
| | RMF | Royal Malaysian Air Force | ANGKASA | Malaysia | |
| | NVY | Royal Navy | NAVY | United Kingdom | |
| | NRN | Royal Netherland Navy | NETHERLANDS NAVY | Netherlands | Koninklijke Marine |
| | NAF | Royal Netherlands Air Force | NETHERLANDS AIR FORCE | Netherlands | |
| | KIW | Royal New Zealand Air Force | KIWI | New Zealand | |
| | NOW | Royal Norwegian Air Force | NORWEGIAN | Norway | |
| | ROP | Royal Oman Police | | Oman | |
| RL | PPW | Royal Phnom Penh Airways | PHNOM-PENH AIR | Cambodia | |
| | RRA | Royal Rwanda Airlines | ROYAL RWANDA | Rwanda | |
| | RSF | Royal Saudi Air Force | ARSAF | Saudi Arabia | |
| RR | RYS | Buzz (Polish airline) | MAGIC SUN | Poland | |
| | RSN | Royal Swazi National Airways | SWAZI NATIONAL | Swaziland | |
| WR | HRH | Royal Tongan Airlines | TONGA ROYAL | Tonga | |
| | RWE | Royal West Airlines | ROYAL WEST | United States | |
| | RSB | Rubystar | RUBYSTAR | Belarus | |
| | RLH | Ruili Airlines | SENDI | China | |
| | RMG | Rumugu Air & Space Nigeria | RUMUGU AIR | Nigeria | |
| | RUR | Rusaero | | Russia | |
| | KLE | Rusaero | | Russia | Centre for Civil Aviation Services |
| | CGI | Rusair JSAC | CGI-RUSAIR | Russia | |
| | RUH | Rusich-T | | Russia | |
| | RLU | Rusline | RUSLINE AIR | Russia | |
| | MIG | Russian Aircraft Corporation-MiG | MIG AVIA | Russia | |
| | RFF | Russian Federation Air Force | RUSSIAN AIRFORCE | Russia | |
| P7 | ESL | Russian Sky Airlines | RADUGA | Russia | |
| | RUZ | Rusuertol | ROSTUERTOL | Russia | |
| 5R | RUC | Rutaca | RUTACA | Venezuela | |
| | RND | Rutland Aviation | RUTLAND | United Kingdom | |
| | RUA | Rwanda Airlines | | Rwanda | |
| | RWA | Rwanda Airways | | Rwanda | |
| WB | RWD | Rwandair Express | RWANDAIR | Rwanda | |
| | RWL | RWL Luftfahrtgesellschaft | RHEINTRAINER | Germany | |
| 7S | RYA | Ryan Air Services | RYAN AIR | United States | |
| RD | RYN | Ryan International Airlines | RYAN INTERNATIONAL | United States | defunct 2013 |
| FR | RYR | Ryanair | RYANAIR | Ireland | |
| RK | RUK | Ryanair UK | BLUEMAX | United Kingdom | |
| | RYZ | Ryazan State Air Enterprise | RYAZAN AIR | Russia | |
| | RAA | Rynes Aviation | RYNES AVIATION | United States | |
| | REV | RVL Group | ENDURANCE | United Kingdom | |
| RT | BUG | UVT Aero | | Russia | |
| WJ | JES | Jetsmart Argentina | SMARTBIRD | Argentina | |

== IATA Traffic Conference Areas ==
The International Air Transport Association (IATA) divides the world into three areas called the Traffic Conference Areas (TCAs) for air travel purposes. These areas are used to define geographical boundaries for fare construction and other industry-related practices:

- Traffic Conference Area 1 (TC1) – this area includes the Americas, encompassing North America (the Caribbean, Central America, and Northern America) and South America.
- Traffic Conference Area 2 (TC2) – this area includes the EMEA region, encompassing Europe, the Middle East, and Africa (North Africa and Sub-Saharan Africa).
- Traffic Conference Area 3 (TC3) – this area includes the Asia–Pacific region, encompassing the rest of Asia (Central Asia, East Asia, North Asia, South Asia, and Southeast Asia) and Oceania.

Essentially, TC1 covers the "New World", while TC2 and TC3 together cover the "Old World" (Africa-Eurasia) and the "Land Down Under".

== See also ==
- IATA airport code
- ICAO airport code
