= Pulkovo =

Pulkovo may refer to:

- Pulkovo Heights marking the southern limit of Saint Petersburg, Russia
- Pulkovo Airport serving Saint Petersburg, Russia
- Pulkovo Aviation Enterprise, a former (until 2006) state airline based in Saint Petersburg, Russia
- Pulkovo Observatory, The Central Astronomical Observatory of the Russian Academy of Sciences at Pulkovo, 19 km south of Saint Petersburg
