= Rossair =

Rossair may refer to:

- Rossair (Australia) - an air charter company based in Australia
- Rossair Executive Air Charter - a defunct South African air charter company
- Rossair Europe - a defunct Dutch airline
