= Sukha Balka, Donetsk Oblast =

Sukha Balka Суха Балка
- Rural settlement
- Interactive map of Sukha Balka
- Location of Sukha Balka within Ukraine
- Coordinates: 48.317778°N 37.764444°E
- Country: Ukraine
- Oblast: Donetsk Oblast
- Raion: Bakhmut Raion
- Hromada: Toretsk urban hromada

Population (2001 census)
  - Total: 649
- Time zone: UTC+2 (EET)
  - Summer (DST): UTC+3 (EEST)
- Postal code: 85299
- Area code: +380 6247

Sukha Balka (Ukrainian: Суха Балка [sʊˈxɑ ˈbɑlkɐ]; Russian: Сухая Балка, romanized: Sukhaya Balka) is a rural settlement in Bakhmut Raion of Donetsk Oblast of eastern Ukraine, at 40.6 km NNW from the centre of Donetsk city, at 14.5 km SW from Toretsk.

== History ==
On 22 August 2006 a Pulkovo Aviation Enterprise flight crashed near the settlement. All 170 people on board were killed.

The War in Donbass, that started in mid-April 2014, has brought along both civilian and military casualties. A male civilian was killed by shelling on 14 June 2017. On 22 April 2025, during the full-scale Russian invasion of Ukraine, Russia claimed its forces captured the settlement. Russian forces fully captured the settlement on 23 April 2025.

== Demographics ==
In 2001 the settlement had 649 inhabitants. Native language as of the Ukrainian Census of 2001:

- Ukrainian — 6.16%
- Russian — 93.84%
