= Flight 521 =

Flight 521 may refer to:

- United Air Lines Flight 521, air accident on May 29, 1947
- Aeroflot Flight 521, air accident on September 21, 2001
- Emirates Flight 521, air accident on August 3, 2016
