= Pulkovo Aviation Enterprise Flight 9560 =

2002 aviation accident

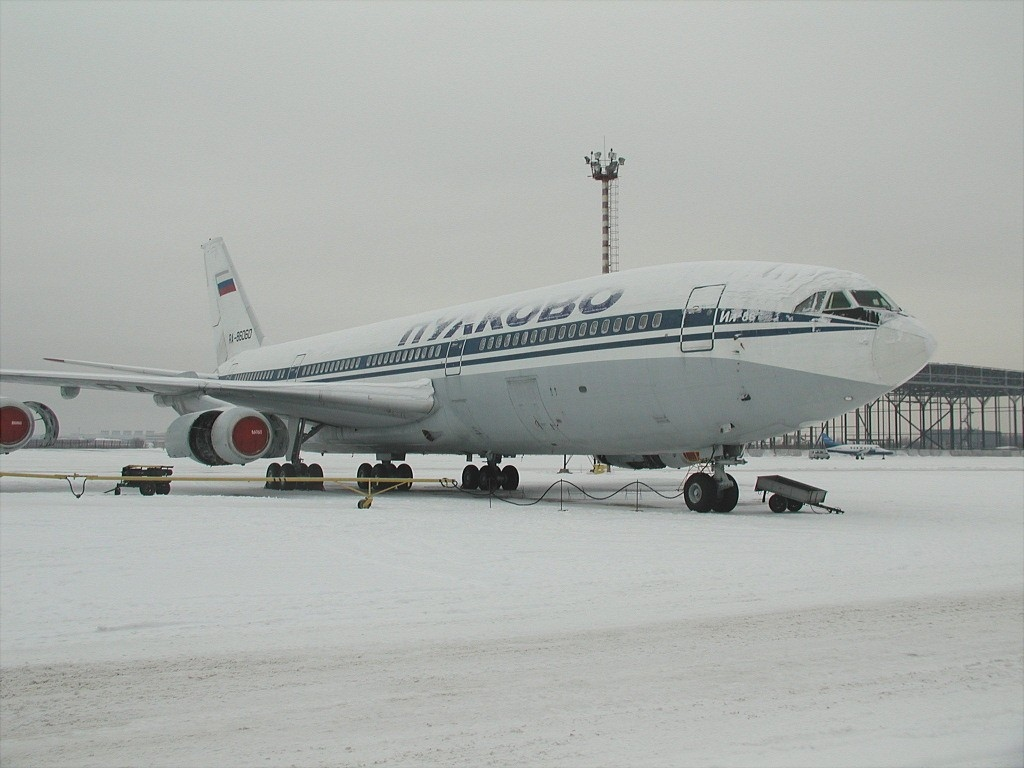
- RA-86060, the aircraft involved in the accident

Accident
- Date: 28 July 2002
- Summary: crashed after takeoff
- Site: Near Sheremetyevo International Airport, Moscow, Russia; 55°59′18″N 37°28′59″E

Aircraft
- Aircraft type: Ilyushin Il-86
- Operator: Pulkovo Aviation Enterprise
- IATA flight No.: FV9560
- ICAO flight No.: PLK9560
- Call sign: PULKOVO 9560
- Registration: RA-86060
- Flight origin: Sheremetyevo International Airport, Moscow
- 1st stopover: Pulkovo Airport, St Petersburg
- 2nd stopover: Sochi International Airport, Sochi
- Last stopover: Sheremetyevo International Airport, Moscow
- Destination: Pulkovo Airport, St Petersburg
- Occupants: 16
- Crew: 16
- Fatalities: 14
- Injuries: 2
- Survivors: 2

Pulkovo Aviation Enterprise Flight 9560 was a repositioning flight from Sheremetyevo International Airport in Moscow to Pulkovo Airport in St. Petersburg. On 28 July 2002, the Ilyushin Il-86 aircraft operating the flight crashed after take-off from Sheremetyevo. 14 of the 16 crew members on board (and the only occupants of the aircraft) were killed, making the crash the deadliest aviation accident involving the Ilyushin Il-86.

== Aircraft and crew ==
The aircraft involved was a 21-year-old Ilyushin Il-86 registered as RA-86060, (factory no. 51483203027, serial no. 027). The aircraft was produced by the Voronezh Aircraft Manufacturing Company (VASO) on 29 October 1983 and was delivered to Aeroflot on 23 November the same year. The aircraft was then transferred to Pulkovo in 1992. The aircraft was powered by four Kuznetsov NK-86 turbofan engines and had flown 18,363 hours up until the day of the accident.

The flight crew comprised:

- The captain was 51-year-old Konstantin Ivanovich Ivanov. He had over 13,000 hours of flight experience, including more than 5,900 hours on the Il-86 (4,000 hours as captain).
- The first officer was 52-year-old Vladimir Andreevich Voronov, who had 11,300 flight hours, with more than 2,200 of them on the Il-86.
- The flight navigator was 51-year-old Valery Andreevich Shcherbina, who had over 13,000 flight hours, more than 7,100 of them having been on the Il-86.
- The flight engineer was 60-year-old Boris Nikolayevich Kushnerov, who had more than 14,000 flight hours, including more than 6,000 hours on the Il-86.

10 flight attendants and two engineers were also on board.

== Crash ==
After a chartered return flight between Moscow, St. Petersburg and Sochi, the flight took off from Sheremetyevo Airport in Moscow at 15:25 MSK, bound for Pulkovo Airport in St. Petersburg with 16 crew members on board.

According to Vadim Sanjarov, the administrative director of Sheremetyevo Airport, the plane took off at a speed of 350 km/h (220 mph; 190 kn) and began to climb normally. Two seconds after takeoff however, both horizontal tail stabilizers suddenly moved to the full-up trim position. The pilots did not have time to rectify the situation and use the backup stabilizer control. According to various sources, the plane fell from a height of 200 or 600 m (660 or 1,970 ft), with decreased engine power.

The aircraft then banked left, stalled, and crashed into the ground, exploding and bursting into flames on impact. However, one of the flight attendants stated that there was no explosion. 14 of the 16 crew members, including all four flight crew members, both engineers, and 8 of the 10 flight attendants, were killed. The two survivors were flight attendants Tatiana Moiseeva and Arina Vinogradova.

== Investigation ==
The accident was investigated by the Interstate Aviation Committee (IAC). Investigators considered how the horizontal tail stabilizers switched to the nose-heavy position, which caused a steep angle during takeoff, causing the aircraft to enter a stall and crash.

The possibility of failure of one of the aircraft engines was also expressed. Some people believed that due to the lack of cargo and passengers, engine speed exceeded the permissible rate, which led to its breakdown. Flight attendant Arina Vinogradova stated that the aircraft encountered turbulence before the crash. Although shaking could be a sign of exceeding the maximum allowable angle of attack and loss of speed, which immediately preceded the stall. Weather conditions at the time of the disaster were normal.

The IAC was unable to determine the cause of the accident. It could also not determine how the stabilizers switched to the nose-up position. One report stated that it was caused by pilot error.

== Aftermath ==
The IAC temporarily suspended the Il-86's type certificate.

According to Vladimir Kofman, the Chairman of the commission for the investigation of aviation accidents, a post-crash analysis of 2,000 flights of the ill-fated aircraft revealed frequent flight safety violations, including improper use of the stabilizers.

== Memorial ==
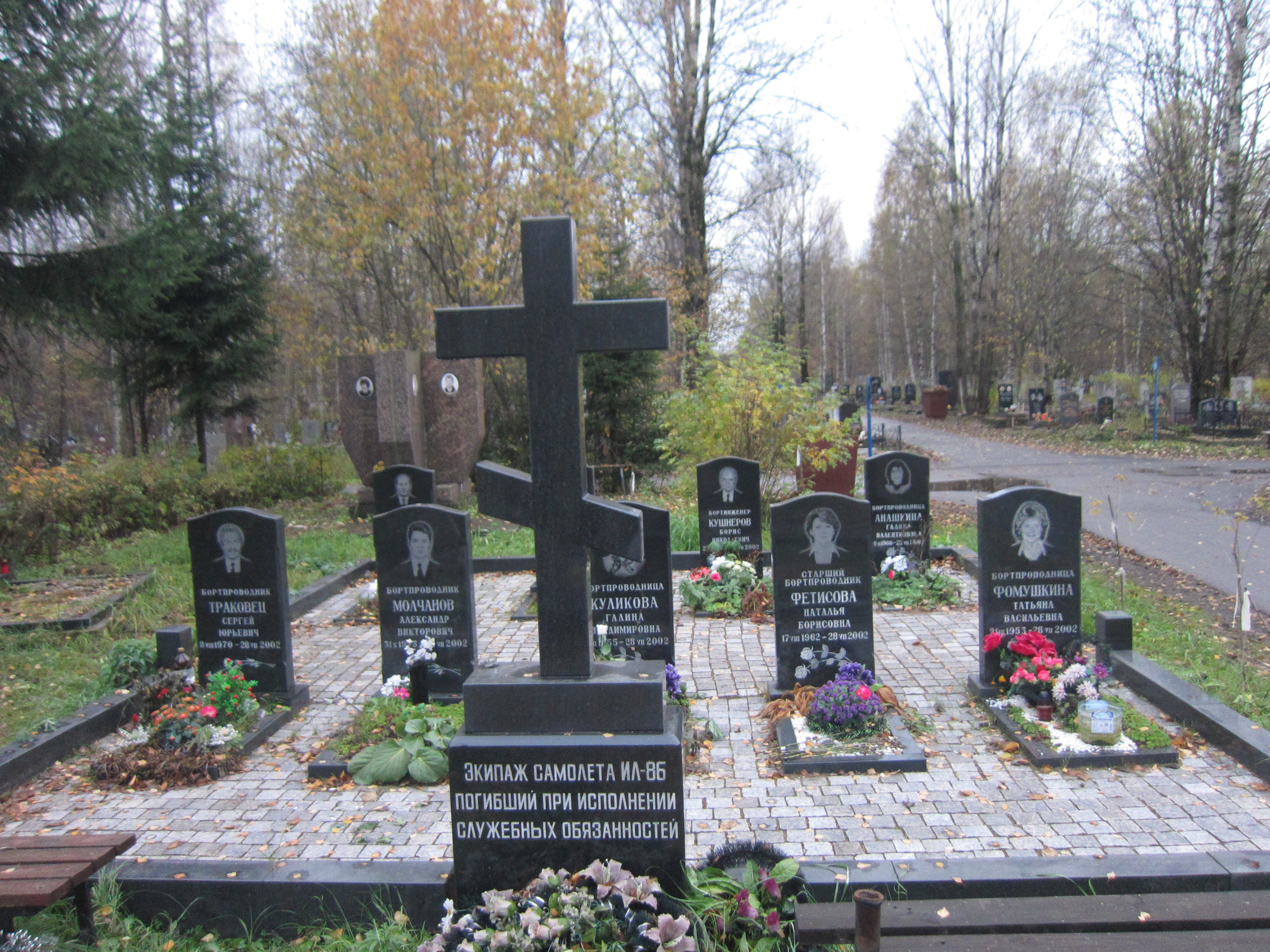
The mass grave of nine of the 14 flight crew members of flight 9560

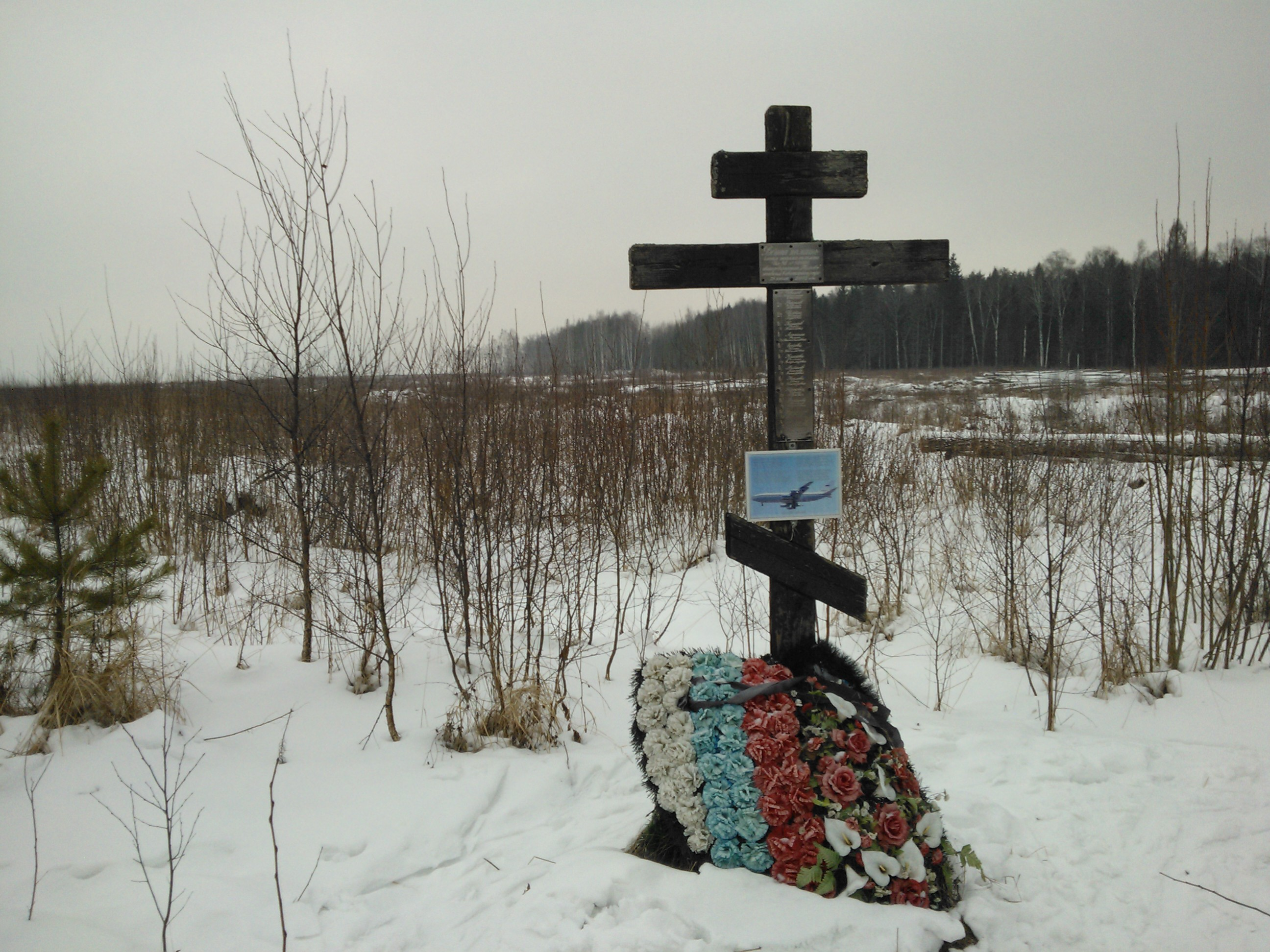
The memorial at the crash site

Nine of the victims were buried in a communal grave in St. Petersburg.

At crash site, a cross was installed. The cross nameplate lists the names of all the victims.
