= Elbrus-Avia =

Elbrus-Avia (Эльбрус-авиа)
IATA	ICAO	Call sign
-	NLK	-
- Founded: 1998
- Ceased operations: 15 April 2009
- Operating bases: Nalchik Airport
- Fleet size: 13
- Destinations: 5
- Headquarters: Nalchik, Russia
- Website: http://www.elbrus-avia.ru/

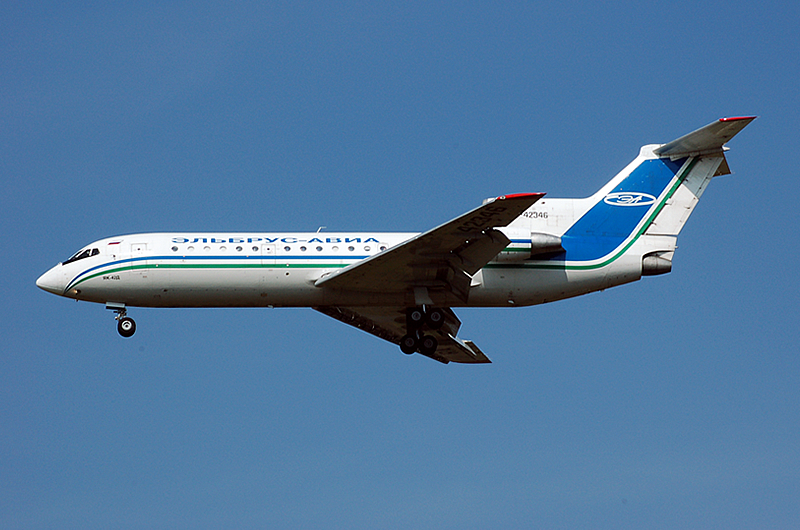
A Yak 42 of Elbrus Avia arrives at London Stansted

Elbrus Avia (Russian: Эльбрус-авиа) was a passenger airline company based in Nalchik, Russia. The airline offered scheduled flights to Moscow. It was the only airline flying to Kabardino-Balkaria where Mount Elbrus, the highest peak of Europe, is its namesake. Founded in 1998, the airline had its licence cancelled by the Federal Air Transport Agency on 15 April 2009.

== Fleet ==
- Yakovlev Yak-42D - 4 (Two stored at Bykovo (Moscow), stored at Nalchik and one operating for Volgograd Airlines)
- Yakovlev Yak-40 - 3 (Stored)
- Mil Mi-8 -3 (used on domestic and special charters)
- Mil Mi-2 -3 (used on domestic and special charters)

== Destinations ==
- Russia
  - Moscow (Vnukovo International Airport)
  - Nalchik (Nalchik Airport) Hub
  - Azau (Mount Elbrus)
- Greece
  - Thessaloniki (Makedonia International Airport)
- Austria
  - Salzburg (W. A. Mozart Airport)
- Turkey
  - Istanbul (Atatürk International Airport)

== Charter flights ==
- Hungary
  - Budapest - Budapest Ferihegy International Airport
- England
  - London - London Stansted Airport
- France
  - Lyon - Lyon Saint Exupery Airport
  - Basel - Mulhouse Euro Airport
- Malta
  - Valletta - Malta International Airport
