= Orient Avia =

Russian airline

IATA	ICAO	Call sign
V6	ORT	–
- Founded: 1994
- Ceased operations: 1997
- AOC #: 399
- Operating bases: Sheremetyevo International Airport
- Fleet size: 8
- Headquarters: Moscow, Russia

Orient Avia (Russian: Ориент Авиа) was an airline based in Moscow, Russia. It operated domestic scheduled passenger services and international charters from its base, Sheremetyevo International Airport in Moscow. Its name came from the Russian Far East, where most of its scheduled destinations were.

The company was founded in 1994 and started operations with four Ilyushin Il-62Ms and a single Ilyushin Il-86. A pair of Tupolev Tu-134B-3s were bought in 1996 to expand its route network. However, the company suffered from financial difficulties. After merger negotiations with cargo carrier East Line failed, Orient Avia filed for bankruptcy on July 10, 1997.

== Fleet history ==
During its operations, Orient Avia used the following eight aircraft:

- 4 Ilyushin Il-62M
- 1 Ilyushin Il-86
- 2 Tupolev Tu-134A-3
- 1 Tupolev Tu-154B-2
