= Pulkovo Aviation Enterprise Flight 9045 =

1994 aviation accident

Coordinates: 43°29′N 43°37′E

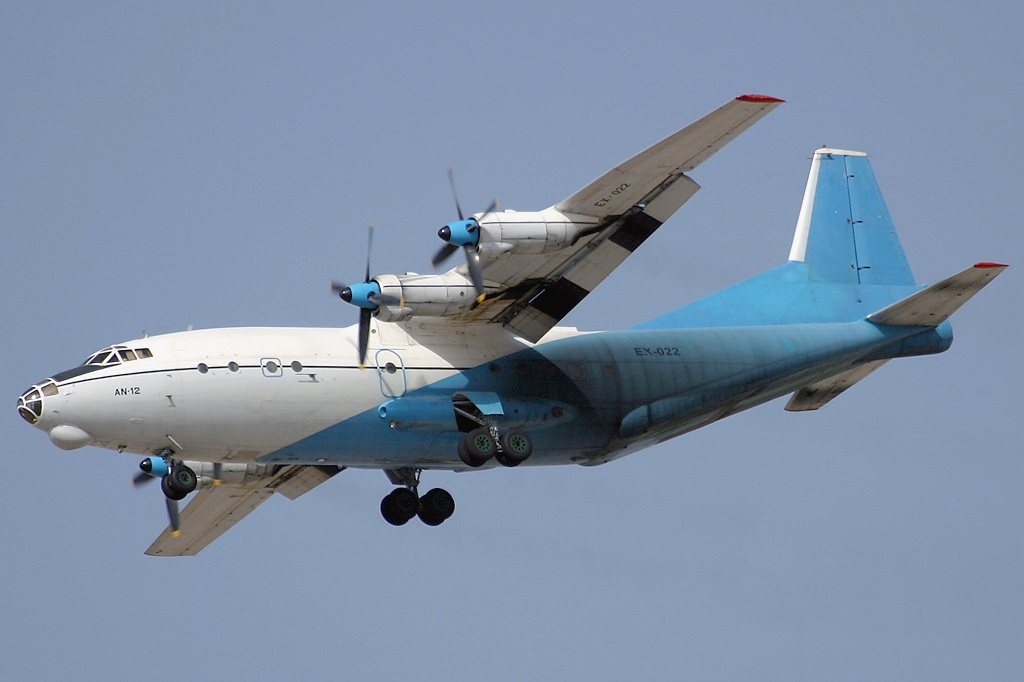
- An Antonov An-12BP similar to the accident aircraft

Accident
- Date: 24 February 1994
- Summary: Icing, loss of control
- Site: Near Nalchik Airport, Nalchik, Kabardino-Balkaria, Russia

Aircraft
- Aircraft type: Antonov An-12BP
- Operator: Pulkovo Aviation Enterprise
- Registration: RA-11118
- Flight origin: Pulkovo Airport, Saint Petersburg
- Stopover: Volgograd International Airport, Volgograd
- Destination: Nalchik Airport, Kabardino-Balkaria
- Occupants: 13
- Passengers: 7
- Crew: 6
- Fatalities: 13
- Survivors: 0

Pulkovo Aviation Enterprise Flight 9045 was a cargo flight that crashed on approach to Nalchik while carrying 12,515 kg (27,591 lb) of coins from the Saint Petersburg Mint, killing all 13 occupants.

== Aircraft and crew ==
The aircraft involved in the accident was an Antonov An-12BP with four Ivchenko AI-20M engines, registered RA-11118 to Pulkovo Aviation Enterprise.

Seven crew members and six passengers were aboard the flight.

== Accident ==
Flight 9045 carried 12,515 kg (27,591 lb) of coins in cargo from St. Petersburg to the stopover in Volgograd. Until landing there were no issues during the flight to Nalchik. The air traffic controller informed the flight crew of the weather conditions at the airport, but failed to mention the issue of ice; hence the crew did not activate the de-icing system for the approach.

When the flight was 13 kilometres (8.1 mi) away from the runway, the crew set the flaps at 15°. At 8 kilometres (5.0 mi) from the runway, the aircraft entered the glide path, after which the flaps were set to 35°. 16 seconds later, the crew increased the engine power to maintain a consistent speed of 260 km/h (140 kn; 160 mph). The flight was already 40 metres (130 ft) above the glide path and the pilots adjusted the elevators from 1 to 5° deflection, only for the elevators to spontaneously go to 15° deflection.

At an altitude of 320 metres (1,050 ft) the aircraft pitched nose-down 50-55° into a rapid descent; the pilots pulled back on the control columns; but due being at a low altitude the aircraft was unable to recover from the dive, the aircraft crashed into a field and was quickly engulfed in flames.

== Investigation ==
The investigation concluded that causes of the accident were as follows:

- Failure of the airport to update the weather report and notify pilots;
- untimely notification of the dangerous weather forecast;
- incorrect recommendations for executing an approach laid out in the aircraft flight manual;
- failure to use the aircraft de-icing system;
- failure to follow procedures as outlined in the aircraft flight manual.
