= Ilyushin Il-86 =

Soviet four-engined wide-body jet airliner

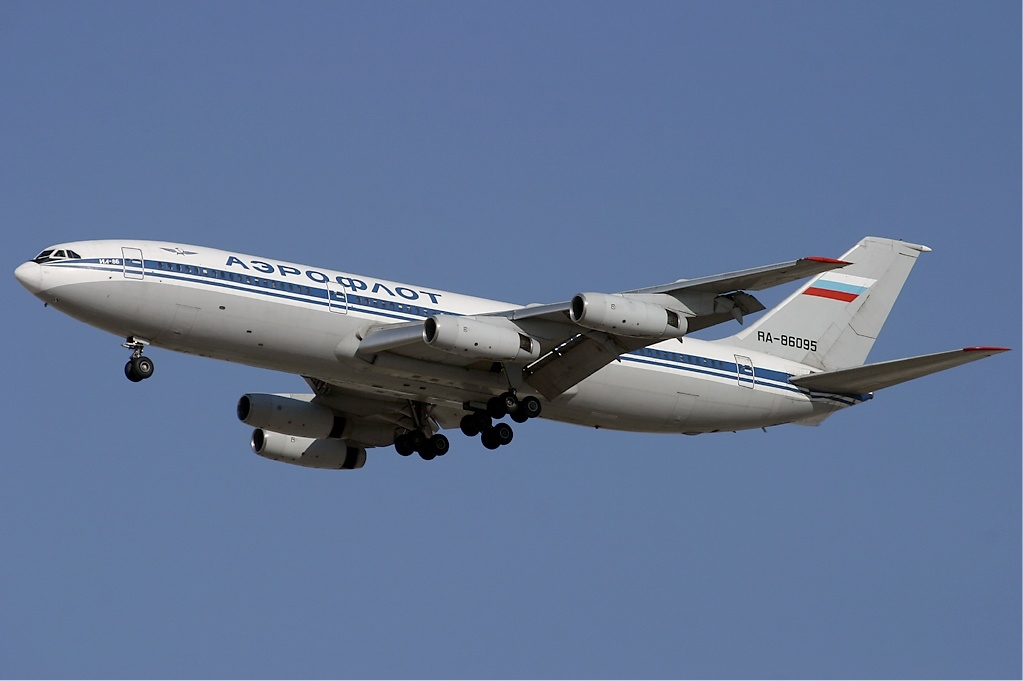
- An Aeroflot Ilyushin Il-86 in 2005

General information
- Type: Wide-body airliner
- National origin: Soviet Union
- Designer: Ilyushin
- Built by: Voronezh Aircraft Production Association
- Status: Retired from civilian service, in service with the Russian Air Force (Note: Retired from airline passenger use in April 2011)
- Primary users: Aeroflot (Former) Siberia Airlines (Former); Kras Air (Former); Donavia (Former)
- Number built: 106

History
- Manufactured: 1976–1991
- Introduction date: December 26, 1980
- First flight: December 22, 1976
- Variant: Ilyushin Il-80
- Developed into: Ilyushin Il-96

The Ilyushin Il-86 (Russian: Илью́шин Ил-86; NATO reporting name: Camber) is a retired short- to medium-range wide-body jet airliner that served as the USSR's first wide-bodied aircraft. Designed and tested by the Ilyushin design bureau in the 1970s, it was certified by the Soviet aircraft industry, manufactured and marketed by the USSR.

Developed during the rule of Leonid Brezhnev, the Il-86 was marked by the economic and technological stagnation of the era: it used engines more typical of the late 1960s, spent a decade in development, and failed to enter service in time for the 1980 Summer Olympics in Moscow, as was originally intended. The type was used by Aeroflot and successor post-Soviet airlines; only three of the total 106 constructed were exported.

At the beginning of 2012, only four Il-86s remained in service, all with the Russian Air Force. By the end of 2020 the number in active service was reduced to three.

== Development ==
=== Background ===
In the mid-1960s, the United States and Western Europe planned airliners seating twice the then-maximum of some 200 passengers. They were known as airbuses at the time. The Soviet leadership wanted to match them with an aerobus (Russian: аэробус). Alongside the propaganda motive, the USSR genuinely needed an aerobus. Aeroflot expected over 100 million passengers a year within a decade (the 100th million annual passenger was indeed carried on 29 December 1976.)

First to respond was OKB-153, the bureau led by Oleg Antonov. It proposed a 724-seat version of the An-22 airlifter. The project was promoted until 1969, ultimately with a 605-passenger interior (383 on the upper deck and 223 on the lower). It did not go ahead due to fears that it would be old-fashioned and because the Kiev-based bureau was close to the deposed Nikita Khrushchev.

=== Concept ===
Many airports had terminals too small for "aerobuses". In the West, the solution to this involved constructing greater airport capacity. By contrast, Soviet aviation research institutes addressed ways of increasing passenger throughput without the need for additional airport capacity.

Many Soviet airports also had surfaces too weak for "aerobuses". The Soviet solution again favoured adapting aircraft to existing conditions, rather than reconstructing airports. The aerobus thus had to match the ground loadings of existing airliners. This called for complex multi-wheel landing gear.

The Soviet solution to the airport capacity issue involved passengers loading and unloading their own luggage into and from the aircraft. This was eventually called "the luggage at hand system" (Russian: "система «багаж с собой»"; transliterated: "sistyema bagazh s soboy"). Soviet aviation journalist Kim Bakshmi described it (at its ultimate) thus: "One arrives five minutes prior to departure, buys oneself a ticket on board the aircraft, hangs one's coat next to the seat and places one's bag or suitcase nearby."

Taking suitcases into the cabin, as in trains, was studied, but necessitated a 3 m fuselage extension with a 350-seat capacity. To avoid this, passengers were to deposit their luggage in underfloor compartments as they entered the airliner.

Ideas similar to the "luggage at hand system" were briefly addressed in the West. Airbus studied such an arrangement in the mid-1970s. Lockheed implemented it into the L-1011 TriStar in 1973 at the request of Pacific Southwest Airlines (who used the baggage compartment as an entertainment lounge) and possibly also to suit potential Soviet buyers (see below).

In October 1967, the Soviet government approved a Ministry of Civil Aviation (Aeroflot) specification for an aerobus. This called for 350 seats and a range of 3,600 kilometres (1,900 nautical miles) with a 40-tonne payload or 5,800 km (3,100 nmi) with seats taken but no freight. The airliner had to operate from smaller airports (classified as Klass "B" and "V" [Russian: класс "Б", "В"] or "Class B/C" by the Soviets) 2,600-metre (8,500 ft) runways.

In the second half of the 1960s, OKB-240 (as the Ilyushin bureau was formally known) was restoring positions lost (with Yakovlev, in favour of Tupolev and Antonov) during the Khrushchev era and was well placed to secure design of the aerobus. When the Soviet cabinet's defence industry committee promoted the Aeroflot specification on September 8, 1969, to a preliminary project, (Russian: аванпроект; transliterated: avanproyekt), it entrusted it to Ilyushin. The bureau received specific operational requirements for the aerobus on February 22, 1970.

In developing the concept which had been agreed, Ilyushin faced four challenges: configuration (layout or "shape"), powerplant, automation (avionics) and manufacturing capacity.

=== Conceptual development ===
Ilyushin began work on the aerobus in late 1969, initially by assessing the development potential of existing aircraft. An enlarged Il-62 (the Il-62-250) would have had a 30-tonne payload, 259 seats and a 6.8 metre/22 ft longer fuselage: a virtual analogue of the Douglas DC-8 "Super Sixty" series. Other proposed Il-62 modifications involved double-deck and "two fuselages side-by-side" developments. There was also a project to "civilianise" the Il-76.

From March 1970 the bureau developed all-new designs under the Il-86 designation. Instead of the "appropriate technology" approach of the Il-62, these designs were to have powered controls, complex high-lift devices and advanced automation which would reduce the number of flightdeck crew.

An early avanproyekt was shown to the Soviet leadership at an exhibition of civil aviation innovations at Vnukovo-2 Airport near Moscow on May 17, 1971. A scale model with the designation of "Il-86" showed the "self-loading" concept with integral boarding stairs, below-deck luggage stores, and below-deck midships galley. It had a twin-aisle interior with nine-abreast seating in a "3–3–3" layout. Ilyushin considered it politic to make the interior wider than any planned airliner except the Boeing 747. The 6.07 m (19.9 ft) fuselage diameter was partly dictated by the need to provide standing room in the underfloor luggage compartments. The Il-86 had the second-widest fuselage of any airliner until the Boeing 777.

On this basis, on 9 March 1972, the bureau was asked to proceed with detailed design. The difference between the 1971 model and the eventual Il-86 was in configuration: the model had looked like an Il-62. At that time, the Central Aero and Hydrodynamics Institute (TsAGI) favoured the clean-winged, rear-engined, T-tailed configuration for airliners. The BAC Three-Eleven and BAC/CASA/MBB Europlane projects had similar configurations.

The configuration of heavy jet aircraft was a politically sensitive issue in the USSR. Aircraft designer Leonid Selyakov states this of the underwing-engine US-pioneered layout which gradually became standard for jet airliners: "The configuration of the В-47, taken on strength by the US Air Force ... brought forth a veritable storm of critical opinions from [Soviet] aviation scientists. Responsible TsAGI officials and industry leaders robustly called that aircraft 'utter nonsense' (similar opinions were expressed of the Boeing 747)."

Similar controversies were known in Western aeronautical circles but this Soviet approach showed a typical streak of dogmatism which held that problems had immutable, "scientifically correct" solutions. However, not all Soviet aviation engineers were so fixed in their ideas, and the configuration issue figured in a meeting held discreetly in Paris in the late 1960s between Boeing engineers (including Joe Sutter, chief project engineer for the 747, and Bob Withington, a senior engineer who was deeply involved in the SST program) and some of their Soviet counterparts. This meeting had been approved at the highest levels of both governments because each side had something the other wanted very badly: the Soviets wanted to know exactly why Boeing had put the 747 engines in under-wing pods instead of at the rear of the fuselage, while Withington and the Boeing engineers had a long list of questions about the processing and use of titanium in airframes (at the time Boeing badly needed this for their proposed Boeing 2707 SST, at Mach 3 too fast and hot for Concorde-style aluminium, and the Soviets then led the world in titanium technology). According to Sutter's account, both sides left the meeting well satisfied with the exchange of information.

It seems (again according to Sutter's account of the aftermath) that this meeting may have made a real difference to Soviet aircraft design, but Boeing's contribution could naturally not be acknowledged publicly by the Soviet side. Ilyushin therefore had to stress that it had been the first in the world to use podded engines suspended from pylons beneath and ahead of the wing, on the experimental Ilyushin Il-22 four-engined jet bomber of 1946 (first use of this designation). Having thus presented the Il-86's ultimate configuration as indigenously Soviet, the bureau could at last show it in public in 1973, six years after publication of the aerobus specification and four years after the design assignment. A modern six-window flightdeck followed, in place of the 18-to-20 window glazing of the Il-18, Il-62 and Il-76.

The main problem facing the Il-86 project was the lack of a suitable engine. It was never resolved. By the close of the 1960s, the US and the UK had turbofans with bypass ratios of 4 or 5 to 1. The first Soviet large turbofan, the Lotarev D-18T, did not appear before the mid-1980s. The Soloviev D-30, originally intended for the Il-86, was the most advanced Soviet civil aeroengine. It had a bypass ratio of 2.4 to 1 and aerodynamic clamshell thrust reversers. It failed to attain the required thrust, however: "only after the lapse of three years that were spent on preparing the advanced development project did it become clear that these engines would not provide the necessary take-off performance." The less-advanced Kuznetsov NK-8 series engine, adopted on March 26, 1975, had a bypass ratio of 1.15 to 1 and drag-inducing grilles over its cascade thrust reversers. Both these engines had high specific fuel consumptions and were noisy. Being ultimate developments of smaller engines, they could not offer growth to future Il-86s.

The appropriate/intermediate technology principles to which most Soviet airliners before the Il-86 had been designed meant that they had typically five-member flight crews. The design and entry into service in 1972 of the Tu-154, an airliner built to high technology principles (more automation, less human input), showed that Soviet science lagged behind in the development of avionics which would remove the need for navigators and radio operators. A programme of avionics development was mounted to enable the Il-86 to operate in most weather with a three-member flight crew, matching Western technology of the time.

The shortage of manufacturing facilities for the Il-86 was a problem from the outset: "The rapid modernisation of the Soviet Air Force ... has left limited scope for the expansion of commercial production ... the lack of production capacity is being remedied partly by ... international cooperation." This meant involving the Polish aircraft industry in the project.

=== Interest in foreign technology ===
The Soviets tried to import technology to solve the issues with the powerplant, avionics and manufacturing capacity. The attempts took two directions. First was wholesale technology transfer similar to the Li-2 deal of the 1930s. This would have delayed Il-86 development, since the programme would have been demoted to a reserve status. The second direction was to import individual systems and items. This would have speeded Il-86 development. The fact that Il-86 development was protracted indicates that for long periods the programme was pursued as backup insurance in case wholesale technology transfer failed.

Before the Boeing 747 had flown, a Ministry of Civil Aviation delegation visited the United States for a series of detailed sales presentations on the type lasting three days. At the 1971 Paris Salon, Ilyushin bureau head Genrikh Novozhilov and Boeing's Joe Sutter are claimed to have arranged an informal technology trade-off. Over supper in a Paris restaurant, the Soviet side ceded information on titanium technology to the Americans, while the latter, "sketching on the tablecloth," ceded information on pylon-mounted podded engines and "the structural and aerodynamic amity of the aeroelastic wing." Soviet interest in buying the 747s continued until the end of détente in the late 1970s.

At the peak of détente, on March 11, 1974, a Lockheed L-1011 TriStar arrived in Moscow for three days of sales presentations and demonstrations. The TriStar matched the Il-86 in size and performance and had development potential. Negotiations to buy 30 TriStars of the L-1011-385-250 version and licence-produce up to 100 a year in a new factory employing 80,000 people continued until mid-1976. Any residual will to export TriStars was scotched when administration of US President Jimmy Carter made human rights a key pillar of US foreign policy. TriStar exports would have needed Coordinating Committee clearance: the type embodied advanced technology banned from potential enemies. In 1978, the US Department of Commerce vetoed export of 12 General Electric CF6-50 engines ordered by the USSR for planned long-range Il-86s.

By analogy with other aircraft programmes, a third direction in the efforts to acquire foreign technology may have involved illicit action along the lines of the reverse engineering of the Tu-4 from the B-29 and the copying of the Rolls-Royce Nene jet engine as the Klimov VK-1. Oblique reference to this comes in an account of the An-124 by the then-powerplant head of the Antonov bureau, V. G. Anisyenko: "The MAP leadership wanted to have a uniform large engine also capable of civil aviation applications, such as the Il-86. The most suitable analogue from this viewpoint was considered to be the Rolls-Royce RB.211-22. To purchase it, in 1976 a MAP procurement party went to Great Britain, headed by engine construction deputy minister Dondukov ... Our ultimate task was to copy the RB.211-22, for which purpose we had to buy not fewer than eight examples ... The English ... would only sell us the engine in quantities ... to power no fewer than 100 aircraft. As a result, we did not get a sample ... "

=== Design, testing, and certification ===
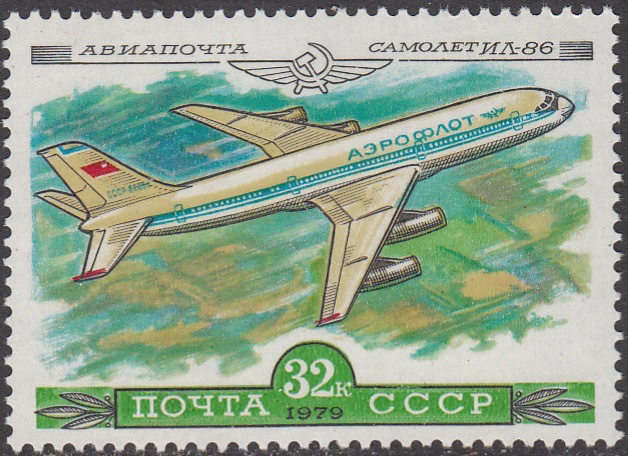
Il-86 Soviet postage stamp, 1979

The design process at Ilyushin was managed by Sergey Ilyushin's successor as head of the bureau, Genrikh Novozhilov. The timescale announced in 1973 envisaged first flight in 1976 and service entry in time for the Moscow Olympics in 1980.

The prototype flew at Khodynka airfield (where Ilyushin's experimental factory was) on December 22, 1976 (Soviet airliners often flew before the close of calendar years to meet the requirements of five-year plans). It was announced that the type had a patented electromagnetic pulse deicing system. which used 500 times less energy than conventional deicers. It is claimed that over 50 new technological processes were introduced into Soviet practice as a result of the Il-86 programme.

The initial test programme was flown by Ilyushin staff, ending two months ahead of schedule on October 20, 1978. Other sources claim that these tests were completed on 22 September 1978. (According to a faster schedule announced at the time of the first flight, Ilyushin tests were to have ended in time for the 60th anniversary of the October Revolution on November 7, 1977.) In-house testing involved speeds up to Mach 0.93 and bank angles up to 11 degrees greater than specified.

Initial certification flying by pilots independent of Ilyushin ended on June 6, 1977. State acceptance trials began on April 24, 1979, and ended on December 24, 1980. Certification by Gosaviaregistr SSSR [the USSR State Aviation Registry] was granted under certificate number 10–86. The Il-86 entered Aeroflot service on 26 December the same year. The service-entry deadline of summer 1980, announced by Minister of Civil Aviation Boris Bugayev in 1977 had passed, however, and the Il-86 missed the Moscow Olympics in the summer of 1980.

Overall development of the Il-86 occupied over a decade. The length of this period was due to the sensitivity of the airliner's configuration, problems with its powerplant, prolonged avionics development and the low priority of civil as opposed to military aircraft. In its earlier stages, the Il-86 programme was also held back by hopes of US airliner imports. Certificating the Il-86 to the very demanding set of Soviet and Comecon standards called NLGS-2 also delayed progress; it was the first Soviet aircraft to undergo a full certification programme since certification was introduced in the USSR in 1967 and became mandatory five years later.

=== Manufacture ===
Production of the Il-86 began in late 1976 and continued until 1991. There was no prototype. The first two machines were handmade by Ilyushin at the bureau's own Moscow facility in 1976 and 1977. One was used for flight testing and the other for static ground testing.

Beyond these initial examples, Ministry of Aircraft Manufacture ("MAP," "Minaviaprom") Factory 64 at Voronezh (today VASO) was tasked with building more than half of each Il-86 and performing final assembly. Three aircraft were assembled at Voronezh by 1979. The first (flown on October 25, 1977) was built largely by hand, subsequent machines making increasing use of production equipment. These aircraft were used in certification and development flying before handover to Aeroflot. Voronezh factory production engineers conducted a "redesign cycle" of over 50 areas, cutting some 1,500 kg (3,300 lb) of airframe weight.

Capacity at Voronezh was insufficient and the Polish aircraft industry was involved in the Il-86 project from the start. The arrangement involved significant technology transfer to Poland: PZL (Państwowe Zakłady Lotnicze) Amalgamation Mielec factory Director Jerzy Belczak said it involved “... a radical retooling of our enterprise” involving “over 50 new processes.” Observers noted that "work on the Il-86 will bring Poland's ... WSK-Mielec to a new level of capability ... in the manufacturing processes involved with an aircraft of this size, including titanium structures, chemical milling and the machining of integral panels."

By the mid-1980s, PZL was planned to produce half of the Il-86, including the entire wing, and also to work on Il-86 developments (“Now we are preparing to manufacture units for the next model of the Il wide-body plane,” according to Belczak). From May 1977, the Polish factory manufactured entire empennages including tailplanes and the fin, all control surfaces, high-lift devices and engine pylons for the Il-86, representing "about 16 per cent of these aircraft." Amid labour and political unrest in Poland from 1980 onwards, the Voronezh factory was instructed to retain wing manufacture.

After certification in 1980, annual Il-86 outputs were: 1980, 1; 1981, 0; 1982, 11; 1983, 12; 1984, 8; 1985, 9 (including the four for 8 ADON); 1986, 11; 1987, 10; 1988, 10; 1989, 9; 1990, 11 (including the three for export to China), 1991, 3. Of the 106 examples built, one never flew (being used for static tests) and three were exported.

The five-year plan in force when the USSR ceased to exist called for 40 more aircraft to be manufactured by 1995, but the manufacturing facility closed in early 1992.

== Design ==
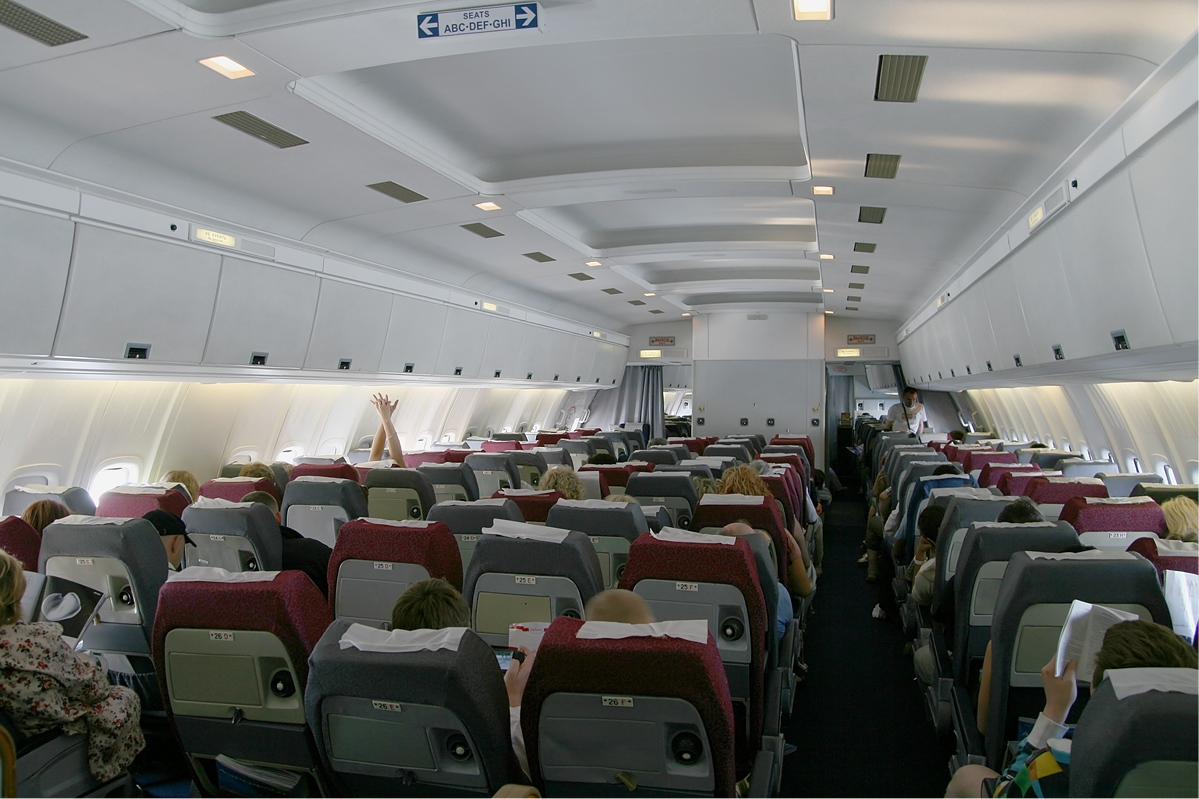
Passenger cabin of an Il-86 showing the absence of overhead storage bins in the centre row. The Il-86's sister model Il-96 also has no overhead storage bins in the center row.

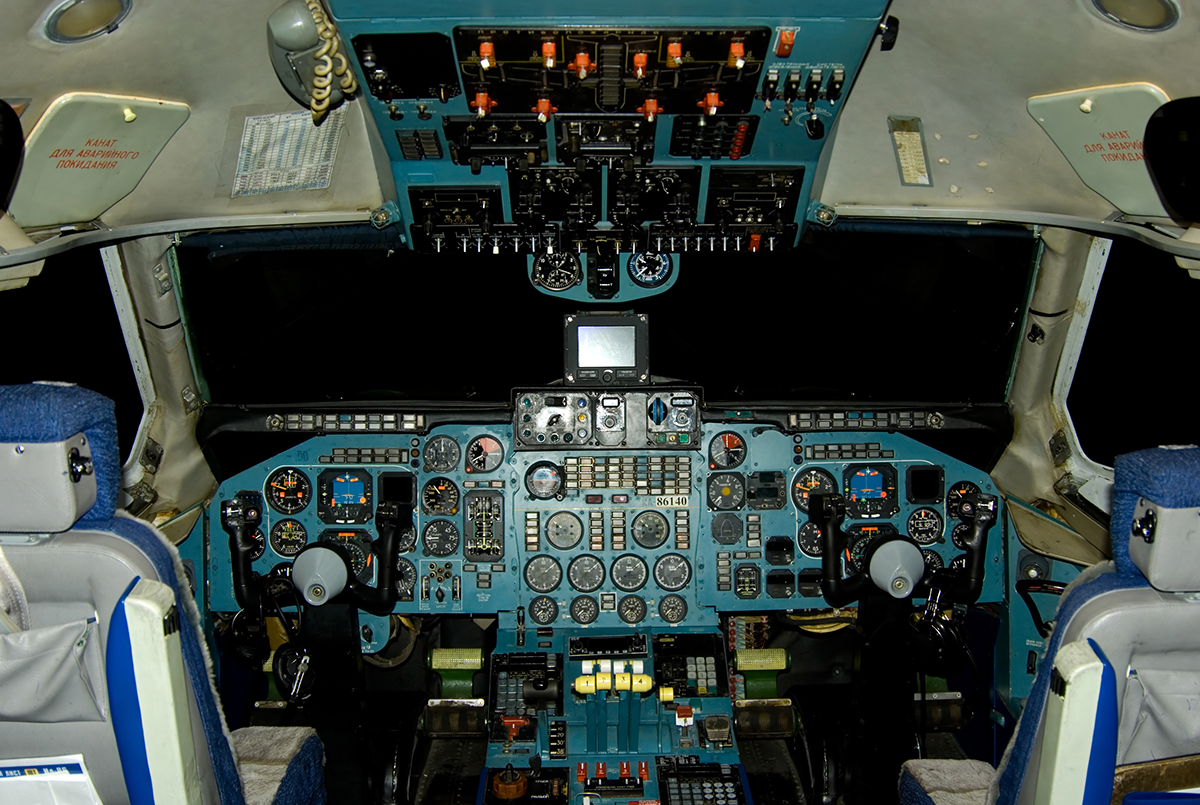
Cockpit of an Ilyushin Il-86

=== Configuration and wing ===
All-metal low-wing land monoplane with four wing-mounted low-bypass turbofan engines.

Cantilever three-spar structure of modified trapezoid planform. Centre section integral with fuselage. Inboard sections, outboard sections and detachable leading and trailing edges. High-lift devices comprise full-span six-segment leading edge slats (contiguous at engine pylons) at up to 17.5% of chord (drooping to 35°), two-segment fixed-vane double-slotted trailing edge flaps occupying some 75% of the span (deploying to 40°) and five-segment spoilers (outboards used as spoilerons at high speeds, inboards used as lift dumpers on the ground). Two-segment outboard ailerons for low speed roll control. Boundary layer fences over pylons. Engines suspended from the wing on pylons act as anti-flutter weights. Trim range is 16–33% of mean aerodynamic chord.

=== Fuselage ===
Circular-section structure of frames and stringers with a continuous main deck and lower decks fore and aft of the centre section. Rectangular windows in most interframe bays, eight ICAO Type 1a passenger doors on the main deck and three more on the lower deck portside; two freight hold doors and a galley supply door on the lower deck starboard. The main deck houses the flightdeck, two wardrobes, eight toilets, two pantries and a three-section passenger cabin. The lower deck houses three entry vestibules/luggage stores with hydraulic boarding stairs to ground level and fixed stairs to the main deck, a midships galley linked with the main deck by an electric lift, two freight holds (fore and aft of the passenger facilities), an avionics bay and two technical bays. The entire accommodation is pressurised and air-conditioned with "earphones for music or on-board cinema."

=== Empennage ===
Cantilevered trapezoid planform swept-back surfaces. Two-segment elevators and rudder. Tailplane area 96.5 m^{2} (1,039 sq ft); incidence adjustable between 2° and 12° by electric motors commanded by yoke trim thumbwheels and console trim wheels. Fin area 56.06 m^{2} (603.4 sq ft). Landing gear of near-conventional layout, with a twin-wheeled nose leg and three four-wheel bogie main gear legs (centreline and two outers). Track is 9.9 m (32 ft 5 3/4 in).

=== Powerplant ===
Four Kuznetsov NK-86 two-spool with five-stage LP compressors, six-stage HP compressors, annular combustor cans, single-stage HP turbine and two-stage LP turbine turbofan engines power the Il-86. The cascade thrust reversers are canted 15° in respect to the horizontal axis. Pneumatic starters start the engines (airborne relights use the windmill effect). The forward-facing ejectors blow away detritus during taxi. International Standard Atmosphere hourly fuel consumption per engine is 7.7 t (16,975 lb) at maximum continuous rated thrust, 6 t/13,230 lb at nominal maximum thrust, 5.1 t (11,243 lb) at 85% thrust, 4.2 t/9260 lb at 70%, 3.6 t (7,937 lb) at 60%, 2.45 t (5,400 lb) at 40% and 1 t (2,205 lb) at idle. Overall hourly fuel consumption at long-range cruise and 190 t (419,000 lb) is 9.75 t (21,495 lb) reducing to 7.79 t (17,174 lb) at 140 t (308,650 lb). Outboard engine pylons on the latter two-thirds of all Il-86s are marginally extended to cut drag. The VSU-10 APU generates power and heats/cools the interior on the ground, and provides engine start air.

=== Controls ===
Hydraulically driven. An SAU-1T-2 automatic flight control system offers assisted manual or automatic flight, with no manual option. Four independent hydraulic systems power all flight controls and the built-in airstairs. Fluid is to the NGZh, rather than AMG, formula.

=== Avionics ===
Pizhma-1 navigational system with OMEGA inputs. GPS transceivers and a TCAS fitted retroactively during the 1990s. Pizhma-1 can be used throughout the flight from departure terminal area to landing and taxi to stand. Pizhma-1 has full-time roll and yaw dampers. Airfield approach aids enable instrument landing system-coupled approaches to ICAO Category II weather minima. Other radio aids include VOR and DME receivers, a weather radar, and Warsaw Pact identification aids. Cockpit voice recorders and flight data recorders standard. Four GT-40PCh6 engine generators generate energy from the Kuznetsov NK-86. The APU or ground sources supply 200/115 V, 400 Hz current to the primary system or two secondary systems (36 V/400 Hz AC and 27 V DC). Recipients include high-lift devices, tailplane trim, deicing, galley lift (elevator) and interior services.

=== Service life ===
The expected service life of an Il-86 is twenty years (up to 25) or 10,000 landings (from 20,000 up to 35,000 hours) prior to major servicing.

== Operational history ==
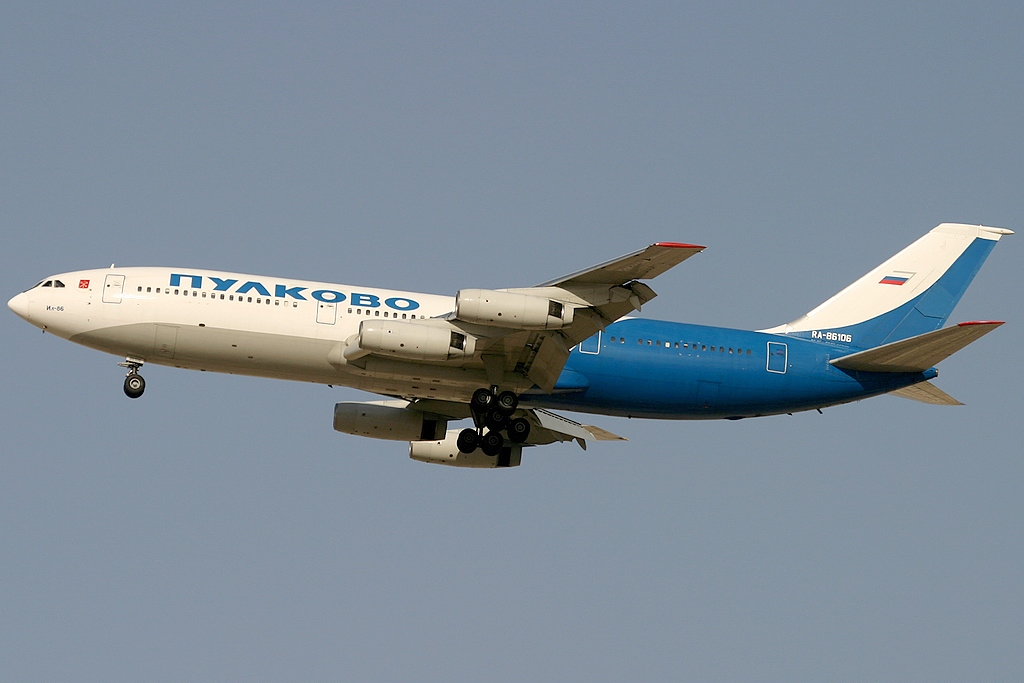
Pulkovo Airlines Il-86 in 2006

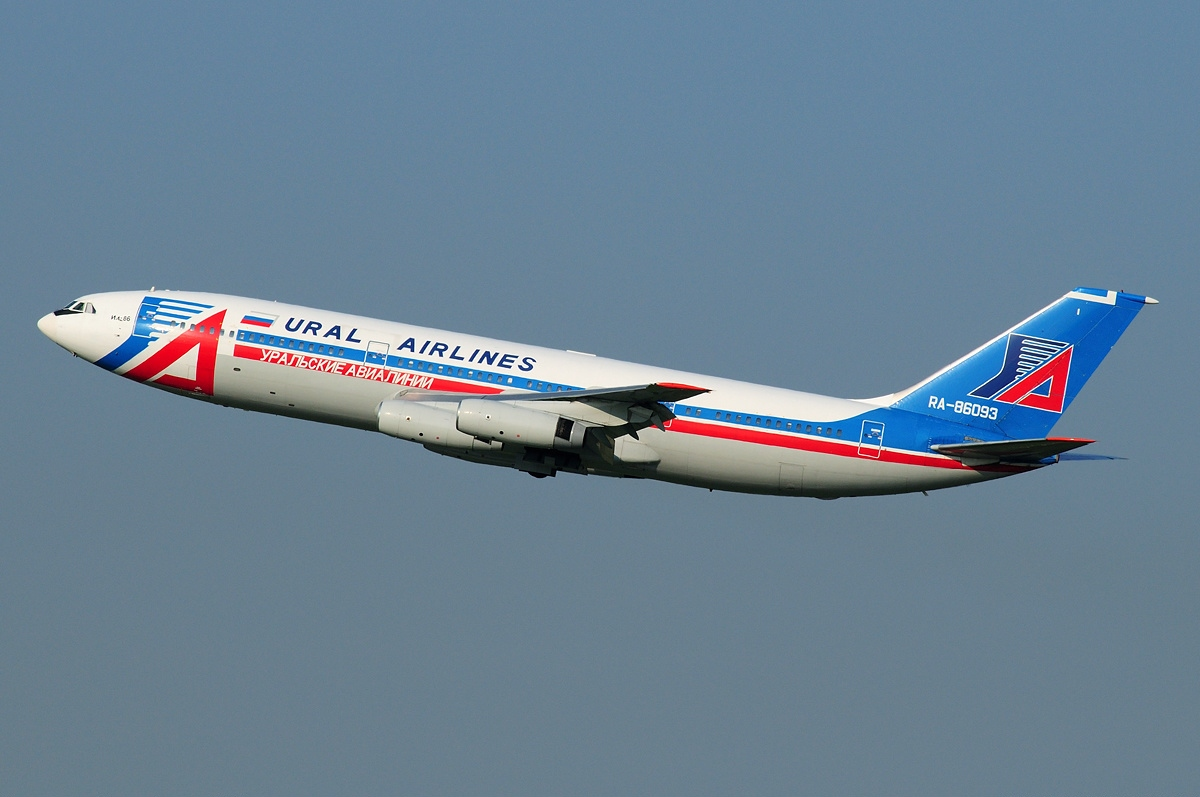
Ural Airlines Il-86 in 2008

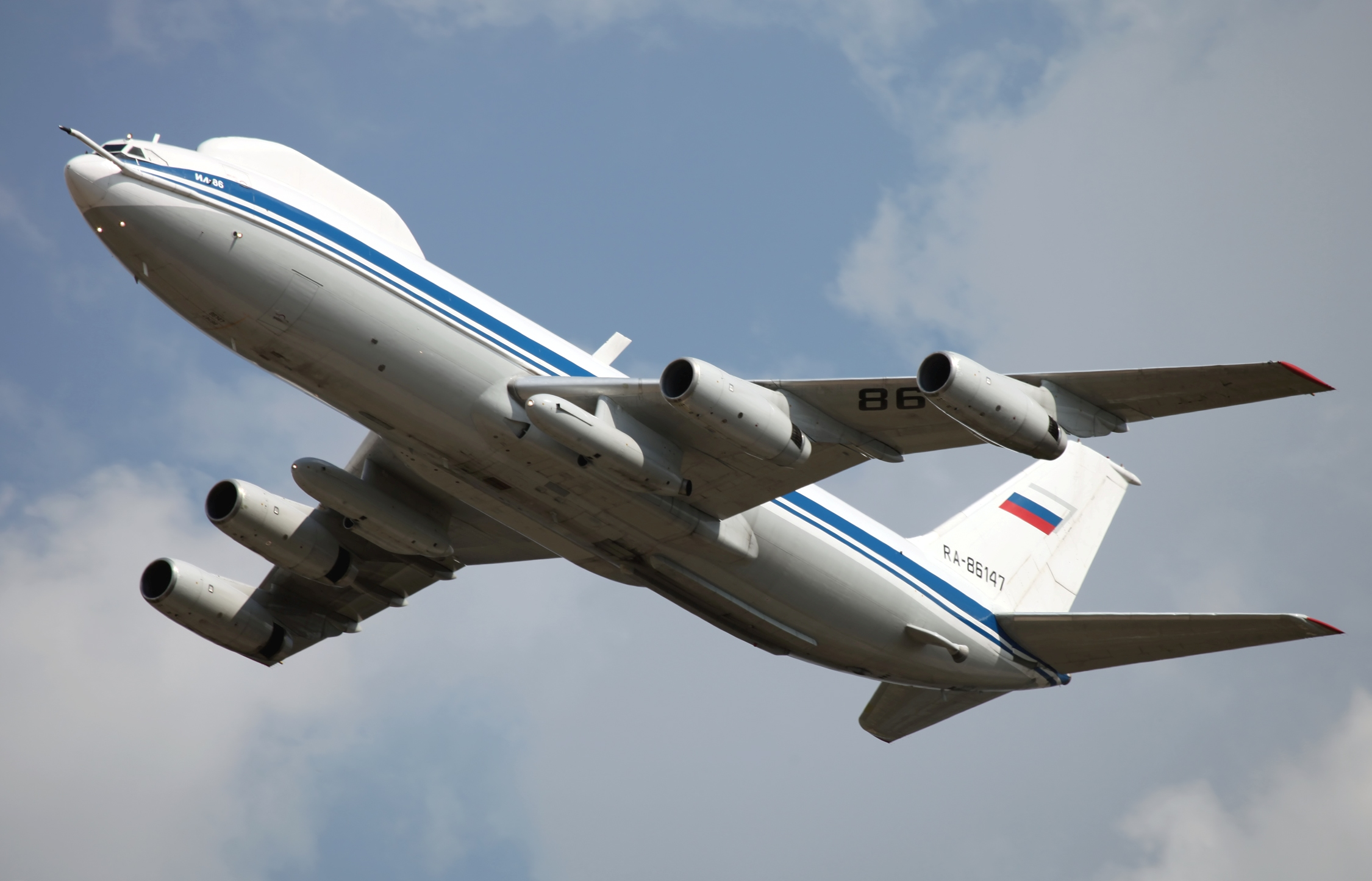
Russian Air Force Il-86VKP in 2012

=== Civil operations ===
An inaugural service from Moscow to Tashkent was flown on December 26, 1980, but services-proper commenced after February 1, 1981. Aeroflot first operated the Il-86 on peak domestic routes. Foreign services began in June 1981 to Eastern Europe. Services to larger West European cities began with the winter timetable starting in October that year. Charter flights to European points followed, with services on high-density medium/long-range routes within the Soviet Union coming last.

Although the Il-86 was a medium-range airliner, from 1982 Aeroflot put it into scheduled service from Moscow to Havana via Shannon and Gander, "perhaps with limited payload or with additional tankerage." Other scheduled long-range services flown by the type were to Buenos Aires, Montevideo and Lima, Rio de Janeiro and São Paulo, all via Sal, Cape Verde.

After the collapse of the Soviet Union in 1991, national airlines emerged in the 15 successor republics. Il-86s serving with Aeroflot administrations ("Directorates") in these nations accrued to their airlines and many were traded. From April 2002, the European Union, the US and much of the rest of the world banned noisier aircraft, including the Il-86. On October 23, 2006, Aeroflot Deputy Director General Igor Desyatnichenko said that the Il-86 was to be withdrawn from service starting November 15 that year as it operated for just two or three months in the summer."

=== Military operations ===
With its built-in stairs and below deck holds, the Il-86 was widely expected to serve in the personnel transport role with the Soviet air forces: "The wide-bodied Il-86 can perform not only as a troop transport ... but may also in the future form the basis for a command and control aircraft for airborne coordination of Warsaw Pact forces."

In the event, four airframes (c/n 042, 043, 046 and 048, carrying quasi-civil registrations SSSR-86146, '7, '8 and '9) were delivered to the 8th Special Purposes Aviation Division at the Chkalovsky air base near Moscow. These are variously claimed to be designated Il-80, Il-82, Il-87 or Il-86VKP (Russian: “ВКП” for “воздушный командный пост”; transliterated: "vozdushniy komandnyi post" “veh-kah-peh” and meaning "aerial command post"). This version has the NATO reporting name Maxdome.

=== Marketing ===
Il-86 provision to Aeroflot did not constitute a sale: it was part of the centralised Soviet supply and allocation system coordinated by offices called Gosplan and Gossnab which controlled the entirety of planning and distribution in the USSR (except the black market). Built aircraft were allocated to Aeroflot regions and Soviet Air Force units as follows (in order of first acceptance): the Vnukovo Aviation Enterprise, 21 aircraft; the TsUMVS Administration of International Air Communications centred on Sheremetyevo Airport, 22; the Tashkent Air Enterprise, 9; the Sheremetyevo Air Enterprise, 10; the Pulkovo Air Enterprise, 8; the Alma-Ata Air Enterprise, 8; the Chkalovsky Soviet Air Force Base 8 ADON (or 8th Special Purposes Aviation Division), 4; the Kol'tsovo Air Enterprise, 6; the Tolmachevo Air Enterprise, 6; the Erevan Air Enterprise, 2; the Yemelyanovo Air Enterprise, 3.

Selling the Il-86 commercially (which under the Soviet system meant solely exports) was the job of the Soviet foreign trade organisation V/O Aviaeksport. The division of responsibilities between the influential TsAGI research establishment, design bureaux (acting like naval architects) which designed aeroplanes, factories (independent of the bureaux) which constructed them, independent service facilities which repaired them and an independent organisation which marketed them alongside designs by all other bureaux, has been seen as diluting responsibility for the fate of a product.

As part of supply provisions within the Comecon, Lot was allocated four Il-86s as barter for component manufacture; the airline deferred deliveries which were cancelled by 1987. In 1988 the East German airline Interflug is said to have prepared to take delivery of two Il-86s and to have allocated them the registrations DDR-AAA and DDR-AAB. Instead, that same year the airline took delivery of two Airbus A310s. The sole export order for the Il-86 − and the sole commercial transactions involving factory-built rather than secondhand examples − was by China Xinjiang Airlines which received three aircraft in 1990.

The first Il-86 to be built was displayed at the Paris Salon International de l'Aéronautique in 1977. It was noted that its interior used patented fire-resistant materials and hydraulics employed a fire-resistant fluid. At that time a version without the "luggage at hand" system was offered, seating 375 or alternatively weighing 3,000 kg (6,600 lb) less and having longer range. This version offered 7% lower seat-mile operational costs. The type was again displayed at Paris in 1979, 1981, 1983 and 1985, the Farnborough Air Show in 1984 and other world air events.

Setting records was a traditional Soviet way of promoting aviation products. On Tuesday September 22, 1981, an Il-86 flown by Commander G Volokhov and Second Pilot A Tyuryumin set Fédération Aéronautique Internationale records for flying payloads of 35, 40, 45, 50, 55, 60 and 65 tonnes over a 2,000 km closed circuit at an average of 975.3 km per hour. Two days later, the same crew and machine set FAI records for flying payloads of 30, 35, 40, 45, 50, 55, 60, 65, 70, 75 and 80-tonne payloads over a 1,000 km closed circuit at an average of 962 km/h. Of these 18 records, one was broken by a Tu-144 in 1983, five were superseded or discontinued and 12 still stood in 2010.

In September 1982 the type made a sales call on Bulgaria, followed by calls in July 1983 on Hungary and Czechoslovakia. Potential buyers received no hard information on the type in advance. Little solid information was given during the sales calls: "constructor Novosilov sidestepped all questions [on fuel consumption] ... [the] chief pilot ... provided a measure of veiled explanation: 'The consumption of the Il-86 is not higher than that of the Il-18,' he said." While welcomed as “proof of friendship with the USSR,” these sales calls failed to attract orders. Observers tacitly noted that the aircraft marked a 10/15-year lag by Soviet civil aviation compared with the West.

=== Unused facilities ===
The Il-86's "luggage at hand" carry-on luggage facility was rarely used. Vul'fov, A, notes: "Thank God no civil servant got it into his head to refuse the parallel opportunity offered to passengers of electing to drop their luggage when checking-in at airports. Otherwise, the loading of luggage into the aircraft by passengers would have turned into a proper nightmare lasting hours."

In 1987 Radio Moscow reported that Aeroflot "resisted the change" to a three-person crew. Vul'fov further reports that the type continued to be operated by four-member crews. Navigators, occupying the observer seat (devoid of instrumentation), stood unsecured on final approach to oversee the pilots' instruments and read-out indications (despite voice synthesizers being fitted). Soviet operations of the Tu-154 airliner similarly employed four or five flightdeck crew, despite foreign operators using three-person flightdeck crews.

== Undeveloped variants ==
Only the base version of the Il-86 and a small batch of military derivatives entered service. Further versions were mooted but none entered service. Freight or combined passenger-freight versions are not known to have been proposed.

=== Proposed long-range version ===
On June 26, 1972, a long-range version of the Il-86, the Il-86D (for Russian: "дальний"; transliterated: "dal’niy"; meaning "long-range"), was ordered into development by the Soviet cabinet. Design was completed in June 1976. The Il-86D would have had a marginally extended wing span, carried additional fuel, and had a range of some 8,500 km (4,600 nmi). Later announcements stated that a version of the Il-86D with Lotarev D-18 engines had entered development in March 1975. This version would have had a 147,500 kg (325,000 lb) empty weight, a 300,000 kg/660,000 lb maximum take-off weight, a fuel capacity of some 150,000 kg (330,000 lb), a wing area of 325 m^{2} (5,300 ft^{2}), and a range of 10,200 km (5,500 nmi). It evolved into the Il-96.

=== Proposed high-capacity version ===
A "minimum-change" development of the Il-86, stated to have been designated Il-86V, was test-flown on 1 June 1982 and was ready for service by 27 April 1985. It was said to have 450 seats, with the underfloor vestibules fitted with seats and possible changes to main-deck seating. The version is not known to have entered passenger service but may have been used by the military.

=== Proposed re-engined versions ===
In the 1980s, there were moves to fit the Il-86 with RB211-22 engines. Designated Il-86V (second use of this designation), this would have had a range of over 9,000 km (4,860 nmi) and/or increased payload. Another 450-seater Il-86V powered by RB211-524G engines was also projected. Amid the disintegration of the Soviet economy, these versions did not progress.

In 1991, there were moves to fit the Il-86 with Franco-American CFM56-5C2 engines. Finances precluded progress. In 1995, International Aero Engines offered the V2500 engine to five Il-86 operators with proposals to re-engine 25 aircraft. The offer was not taken up.

== Operators ==
=== Military ===
As of 2020, three modified Ilyushin Il-86VKP remained in service with the Russian Air Force, down from four aircraft in 2010. The type had already been operated by and taken over from the former Soviet Air Force.

=== Civil ===
As of May 2011, no civilian Il-86s remained in service. The following airlines used to operate Il-86s aircraft for civil passenger or freight operations:

Armenia	Armavia and Armenian Airlines
China	China Xinjiang Airlines
Georgia	AJT Air International
Kazakhstan	Air Kazakhstan and Kazakhstan Airlines
Pakistan	Hajvairy Airlines
Russia	Aeroflot Russian Airlines and other successors of Aeroflot Soviet Airlines including Aerolicht, East Line Airlines, Krasnoyarsk Air, Moscow Airlines, Orient Avia, Pulkovo Aviation Enterprise, Russian Sky Airlines, Transeuropean Airlines, Vnukovo Airlines and Atlant-Soyuz Airlines
USSR	several regional units of Aeroflot Soviet Airlines
Uzbekistan	Uzbekistan Airways, IRS Aero and Jana Arka Airlines
Ukraine	Ukraine International Airlines

== Accidents and incidents ==
As of August 2013, the Il-86 is known to have been involved in at least 10 incidents, including 4 hull losses with a total of 23 fatalities unrelated to passengers. During its passenger-carrying operations the Il-86 has not been involved in any fatal accident.

The following are reported significant recorded safety events involving the Il-86:

- On an unknown date in 1980, the aircraft registered SSSR-86004 (constructor's number 51483200002 ["002"]) experienced a fire in engine No 4 on departure from Vnukovo on an acceptance testing flight; the crew initially shut down No. 1 in error, then No. 4, but landed safely on the reciprocal runway to the one from which they had departed, after performing a 180° turn. No casualties. The investigation into this fire resulted in a modification to the engine.
- In 1984, SSSR-86011 (c/n 009) was found to have suffered a tail strike on landing at Simferopol. No casualties.
- On March 8, 1994, RA-86119 (c/n 087) parked at Delhi airport was struck by debris of crashing Sahara India Boeing 737 (VT-SIA) flown by a trainee; both aircraft were destroyed. All 4 crew on the 737 were killed. Two Aeroflot employees and Russian ground engineer died inside the Il-86 due to a fire and an airport worker was killed on the ground.
- In 1998, RA-86080 (c/n 051) was found to have been overstressed, most likely by a recent heavy landing, and repairs were considered inexpedient in view of coming retirement. No casualties; aircraft broken up at Sheremetyevo Airport in 2001.
- On May 1, 2000, RA-86113 (c/n 081) suffered an apparent engine failure and fire on departure from Sochi. The flight crew brought the machine to a safe overweight landing. The failure and fire indications were found to have been spurious. No casualties.
- On August 26, 2000, RA-86066 (c/n 033) experienced a failure and fire in No 2 engine shortly after take-off from Moscow Sheremetyevo for Barcelona. The crew landed on the reciprocal runway with no further incident. No casualties.
- On September 21, 2001, RA-86074 (c/n 041) operating as Aeroflot Flight 521 belly-landed at Dubai after a flight from Moscow, the flight crew having switched off the ground proximity warning due to heavy workload on the approach and then neglected to extend the landing gear; no casualties; aircraft written off.
- On July 28, 2002, Pulkovo Aviation Enterprise Flight 9560 RA-86060 (c/n 027) crashed shortly after departure from Moscow on a repositioning flight to Saint Peterburg. The trim toggle button on the control column caused a spontaneous retrimming of the tailplane, rapid transition to nose-heavy trim and a dive. The four flightdeck crew, two ground support staff and ten cabin crew aboard the aircraft died, making the crash the deadliest aviation accident involving the Il-86. The two injured survivors were cabin crew members.

Following the Moscow crash in July 2002, the MAK Interstate Aviation Committee withdrew the Il-86's certificate of airworthiness, temporarily grounding the type. The certificate was rapidly restored in stages by early 2003. The accident prompted the Egyptian civil aviation authorities to attempt to ban Il-86 operations to Egypt. Amid continuing negotiations, by 2007 the intention had lapsed, with intensive Il-86 operations to and from Egypt continuing.

== Aircraft on display ==
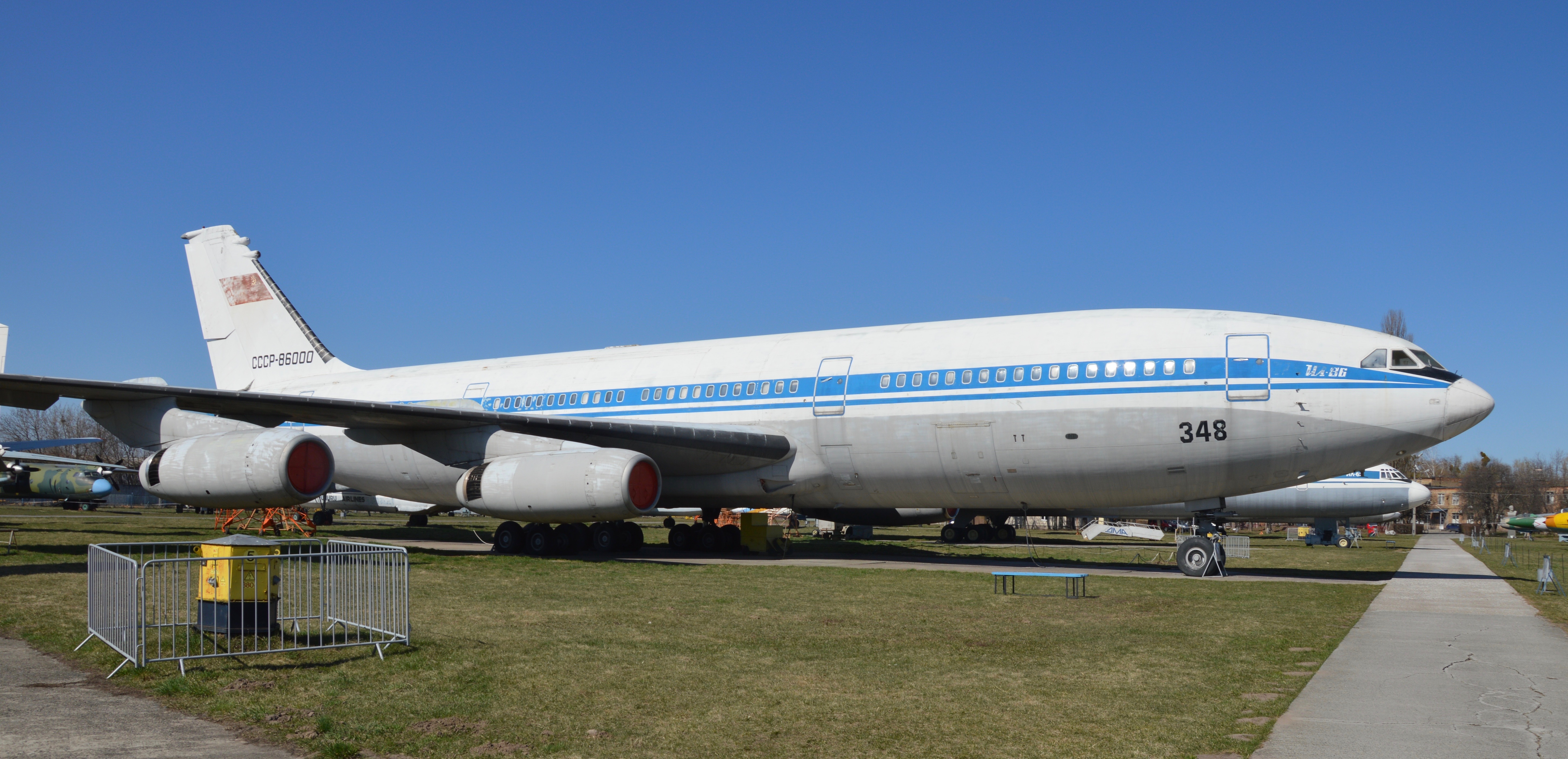
The first prototype of the Ilyushin Il-86 (registration CCCP-86000, c/n 0101) on public display at the Ukraine State Aviation Museum in Kyiv.

- CCCP-86000 (c/n 0101) – The first prototype Il-86 is preserved at the Ukraine State Aviation Museum in Kyiv, Ukraine. It retains its original Soviet Aeroflot livery.
- RA-86062 (c/n 51483203029) – Preserved at the Ulyanovsk Museum of Civil Aviation in Ulyanovsk, Russia. The aircraft previously operated for Aeroflot, Belavia, and Atlant-Soyuz Airlines, and currently carries the Atlant-Soyuz livery.
- RA-86097 (c/n 51483207068) – Preserved as a museum aircraft at Tolmachevo Airport in Novosibirsk, Russia. It was formerly operated by S7 Airlines (Sibir Airlines) and was converted into an on-site aviation history exhibit after its retirement.

== Specifications ==
Specifications
Crew	3–4 flightdeck, 11 service
Accommodation	320 (18F, 56J, 246Y) or 350Y
Freight	16.0 m^{3} (565 cu ft)
Length	60.22 m (197 ft 7 in)
Height	15.67 m (51 ft 5 in)
Span	48.06 m (157 ft 8 in)
Wing	300 m^{2} (3,229 sq ft), 35° ¼ chord sweep, 7:1 AR
MTOW	215 t (474,000 lb)
OEW	115–117.5 t (254,000–259,000 lb)
Payload capacity	40–42 t (88,000–93,000 lb)
Fuel capacity	86 t (190,000 lb)
Turbofans (4x)	Kuznetsov NK-86
Unit thrust	127.5 kN (28,665 lbf)
Cruise	Mach 0.782 – Mach 0.82 (831–871 km/h; 516–541 mph; 449–470 kn)
Range	5,000 km (2,700 nmi; 3,107 mi) (ICAO reserves, 300 pax)
Takeoff BFL (ISA)	2,800 m (9,190 ft)
Landing	1,200 m (3,940 ft)
Max. rate of climb	15 m/s (2,950 ft/min) (SL, 210 t [463,000 lb])
Fuel burn	12–14 t (26,000–31,000 lb) per hour

== See also ==
Related development

- Ilyushin Il-96

Aircraft of comparable role, configuration, and era

- Airbus A300
- Boeing 747
- Lockheed L-1011 TriStar
- McDonnell Douglas DC-10

Related lists

- List of jet airliners
- List of civil aircraft
