= Pulkovo Aviation Enterprise Flight 612 =

2006 aviation accident

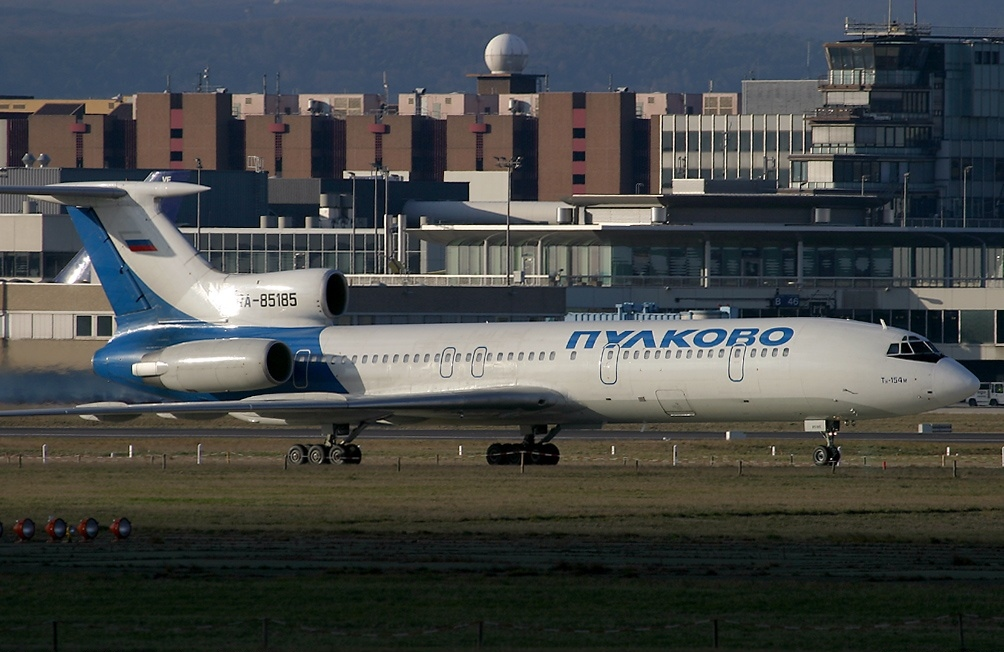
- RA-85185, the Tu-154 involved, photographed in 2004

Accident
- Date: 22 August 2006
- Summary: Entered unrecoverable stall in-flight due to pilot error
- Site: Sukha Balka, Donetsk Oblast, Ukraine; 48°19′59.56″N 37°44′44.83″E

Aircraft
- Aircraft type: Tupolev Tu-154M
- Operator: Pulkovo Aviation Enterprise
- IATA flight No.: FV612
- ICAO flight No.: PLK612
- Call sign: Pulkovo 612
- Registration: RA-85185
- Flight origin: Anapa Airport, Anapa, Russia
- Destination: Pulkovo Airport, Saint Petersburg, Russia
- Occupants: 170
- Passengers: 160
- Crew: 10
- Fatalities: 170
- Survivors: 0

Pulkovo Aviation Enterprise Flight 612 was a scheduled passenger flight operated by Saint Petersburg–based airline Pulkovo Aviation Enterprise, flying from Anapa Airport to Pulkovo Airport in Saint Petersburg. The aircraft crashed in Donetsk Oblast in eastern Ukraine, near the Russian border, on 22 August 2006. All 170 people on board were killed.

The crash was the deadliest aviation accident in 2006. At the time it was the deadliest crash in modern Ukrainian history and the second deadliest in Ukraine, after the 1979 Dniprodzerzhynsk mid-air collision. The death toll was eventually surpassed in 2014 when Malaysia Airlines Flight 17 was shot down 40 miles (64 km) east of where Flight 612 had crashed, also located in Donetsk Oblast, killing all 298 people on board.

== Aircraft & Crew ==
Pulkovo Aviation Enterprise Flight 612 was served by a Russian Tupolev Tu-154M airliner (registration: RA-85185). The aircraft did not refuel in Anapa and departed on time. "The Pulkovo Airlines flight departed Anapa as scheduled. All necessary maintenance was performed as required before departure," said Oleg Tolstyh, General Director of Anapa's Vityazevo Airport. The aircraft was manufactured in 1992 and had been in service for approximately 25,000 flight hours. It had first flown in China by Sichuan Airlines under register number B-2626 until Pulkovo Aviation Enterprise acquired it in 2001.

The captain of the aircraft, 49-year-old Ivan Ivanovich Korogodin (referred to as "Vanya" on the CVR recording), had 12,312 hours of flying experience, 5,956 of which were as a pilot of a Tu-154. The first officer, 59-year-old Vladimir Vasilievich Onishchenko, had 11,876 flight hours, including 2,200 hours on the Tu-154. 23-year-old Andrei Nikolaevich Khodnevich, a trainee pilot, was also on board the aircraft and had only 189 flight hours, with 88 of them on the Tu-154. The navigator, 36-year-old Igor Yurievich Levchenko, had 7,848 hours, 5,596 of them on the Tu-154. The flight engineer, 51-year-old Viktor Petrovich Makarov, had 9,064 flight hours, including 6,701 hours on the Tu-154.

== Crash ==
On 22 August 2006, at 15:04 (Moscow Time), a Tu-154 airliner of Saint Petersburg-based Pulkovo Airlines took off from Anapa Airport in Russia for Pulkovo Airport in Saint Petersburg.

Half an hour later, there were thunderstorms in the vicinity of the flight, and the aircraft entered an area of severe turbulence. As a result, at 15:33, the crew requested and was given permission to climb to 39,000 feet (12,000 m). Just before 15:35, they reported to ATC reaching FL 390.

At 15:35:02, the crew disengaged the autopilot. Almost immediately, the stall warning sounded and then the flight's angle of attack increased to 46 degrees while its forward airspeed dropped to zero. The flight sent an SOS signal and disappeared from radar contact. It entered a deep stall from which the crew could not recover. Two of the three engines flamed out, and the crew was communicating with ATC during the stall, reporting descending. At 15:38:29, the flight crashed 45 kilometres (28 mi; 24 nmi) north-west of Donetsk, near the village of Sukha Balka, killing all 170 people on board.

"At an altitude of 37,000 feet (11,000 m), the aircraft sent three SOS signals, dropped sharply in altitude and sent another SOS at 9,800 feet (3,000 m)," said Anatoli Samoshin, Vice Flight Operations Director at Pulkovo Aviation Enterprise. There were no other communications. The crash was witnessed by a local farmer and a young couple seeking shelter from the rain. They told reporters that they saw the aircraft falling out of the sky and that it burst into flames upon hitting the ground. They could see people in a number of seats that were thrown out of the aircraft on impact, but none showed any signs of life.

External videos
- Footage of the crash on YouTube
- Before crash footage (boarding) on YouTube

A Ukrainian teenager managed to record a video of the crash on a cellphone. The video of the crash was uploaded to YouTube titled "Tu-154 crash" one day after the accident.

Pulkovo Aviation Enterprise issued an announcement on their website confirming the crash, and providing hotlines and information for relatives of the passengers, or crew.

== Investigation ==
Approximately 260 rescue personnel arrived at the scene, which was blocked off by the authorities. The field of debris and bodies was about 400 metres (1,300 feet) in length. On 23 August, Ukrainian emergency service personnel concluded their search for bodies, confirming that all 170 people on board had perished. Because of the extensive crash forces and post-accident fires, rescuers believed that it would be very difficult to identify the majority of the victims at the site. The aircraft belly-flopped into a swampy area and disintegrated on impact. The search for the black boxes, which was interrupted for the night, concluded the following morning, when both recorders were found and subsequently transported to Moscow for analysis.

The Interstate Aviation Committee (IAC or Russian: MAK), after initial decoding of the flight recorder data, issued flight safety recommendations advising to avoid entering thunderstorms, to follow all maximum height limitations based on aircraft load and outside air temperature and to improve pilot training when working in these situations.

The IAC final report concluded:

The cause of the crash was the aircraft being flown in manual flight mode with excessive angles of attack causing a stall with a subsequent transition to a flat spin and collision with the ground at high vertical speed. The flight manual and crew training programs did not provide instruction on manual pitch control and pitch trim during high-altitude flight. The lack of appropriate simulators contributed to the crew's lack of ability. While avoiding areas of thunderstorms and turbulence, the crew allowed the aircraft to enter pitch oscillations exceeding the angle of attack operational range. Lack of control over speed and not following the Flight Manual to prevent and recover from a stall and poor crew resource management allowed the situation to escalate into a catastrophic one.

== Victims ==
There were 160 passengers and 10 crew members aboard the aircraft. Among the passengers, 115 were adults and 45 were children under 12 years old. Among the adults, eight were over 60 (including a 92-year-old woman who flew with her grandson, his wife and two great-grandchildren). Earlier reports by the media and by the airline indicated that 159 passengers were on the flight, 39 children under 12 and six infants under two years of age. Some other sources reported that the plane was carrying 171 people. Authorities could not explain this apparent discrepancy with the numbers and asked the public to wait for expert analysis to be completed.

The Russian Ministry of Emergency Situations published a list of passengers travelling on Flight 612. Of 159 people, 20 were travelling to Norilsk through Saint Petersburg, and three to Murmansk. Most of the passengers were families travelling back from vacations with children.

Five passengers had multiple citizenship in addition to Russian (one from the Netherlands, two from Germany, one from France and one from Finland).

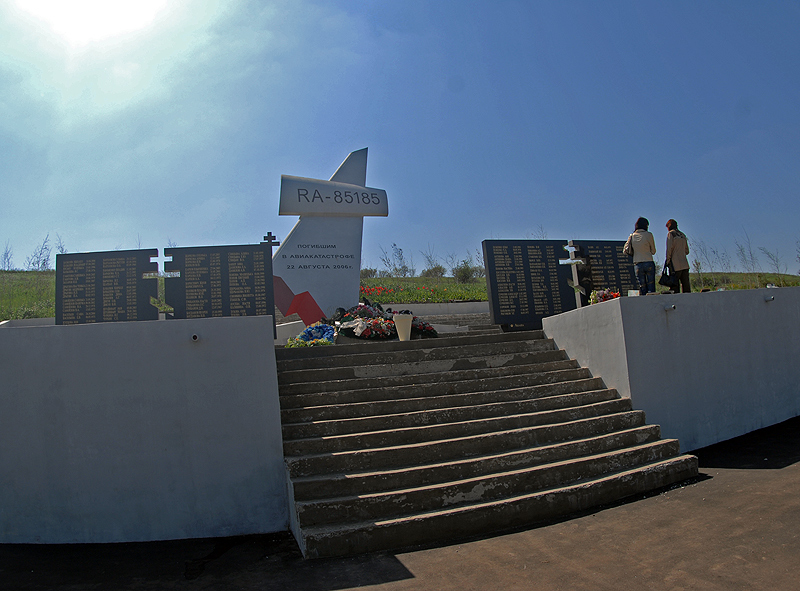
Memorial for the crash victims

Ukraine held a national day of mourning for the people killed in the crash on 23 August, and shifted celebration of its 15th Independence Day from 24 August to 26 August. Russia held a national day of mourning on 24 August 2006.

== See also ==
Accidents of a similar nature include:

- Aeroflot Flight 5143
- Indonesia AirAsia Flight 8501
- West Caribbean Airways Flight 708
- Air France Flight 447
