= Nalchik Airport =

Airport in Russia

Nalchik International Airport Налшыкэ Псытыхэм ипэ зэхуэхэр Аэропорт

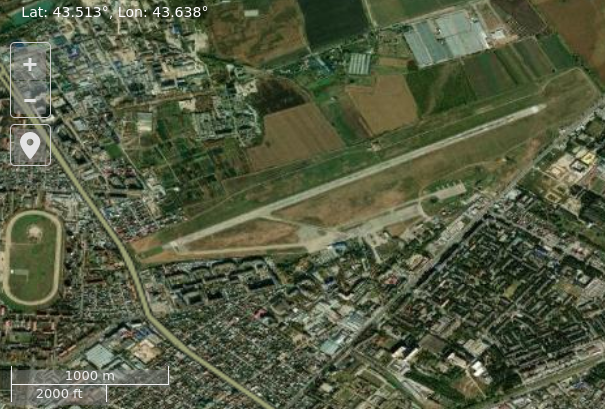
- Satellite imagery of Nalchik Airport
- IATA: NAL; ICAO: URMN

Summary
- Airport type: Public / Military
- Operator: FSUE "Elbrus-Avia"
- Serves: Nalchik
- Location: Nalchik, Russia
- Elevation AMSL: 1,460 ft (450 m)
- Coordinates: 43°30′48″N 43°38′18″E
- Website: nalchik-airport.ru
- Interactive map of Nalchik International Airport

Runways
Direction	Length		Surface
Direction	ft	m	Surface
06/24	7,218	2,200	Asphalt

Nalchik International Airport (Kabardian: Налшыкэ Псытыхэм ипэ зэхуэхэр Аэропорт, Karachay-Balkar: Нальчикни Эл арды Аэропорт, Russian: Международный Аэропорт Нальчик) (IATA: NAL, ICAO: URMN) is a small airport in Kabardino-Balkaria, Russia, located 3 km (1.9 mi) northeast of Nalchik. It handles small airliners; the terminal area has space for 12 jets and 6 small aircraft and supports 24-hour operations.

The airport has had a minor military presence with the 368 OSAZ (368th Independent Mixed Aviation Regiment) which flew Antonov An-12 cargo aircraft.

The airport is currently home to the Nalchik Mountain range Test Centre of the 929th State Flight Test Centre named for V. P. Chkalov as part of the Russian Aerospace Forces.

== Airlines and destinations ==
Airlines	Destinations
Jazeera Airways	Seasonal charter: Jeddah
Pobeda	Moscow–Sheremetyevo, Moscow–Vnukovo, Saint Petersburg
UVT Aero	Kazan, Sochi
Yakutia Airlines	Moscow-Vnukovo, Yakutsk (both begin 5 October 2026)

== Accidents and incidents ==
- In 1994 Pulkovo Aviation Enterprise Flight 9045 crashed on approach while carrying 12,515 kg (27,591 lb) of coins from the Saint Petersburg Mint.

== See also ==
- List of airports in Russia
- List of military airbases in Russia
