= Rosneft-Baltika =

Rosneft-Baltika (Russian РОСНЕФТЬ-БАЛТИКА)
- Founded: 1997
- Ceased operations: 2007
- Hubs: Rzhevka Airport, St Petersburg
- Fleet size: 3
- Headquarters: St Petersburg, Russia
- Key people: Sergeev Yuri G (General Manager)

Rosneft-Baltika was a charter airline based in Rzhevka Airport near St Petersburg, Russia, which was founded in 1997. The airport was abandoned in 2007 with the runways now used for car parking, and none of their fleet has been spotted since.

== Fleet ==
Aircraft type	Active	Notes
Mil Mi-8	2	
Yakovlev Yak-40K	1	
