= Aeroflot Flight 521 =

2001 aircraft accident in the United Arab Emirates

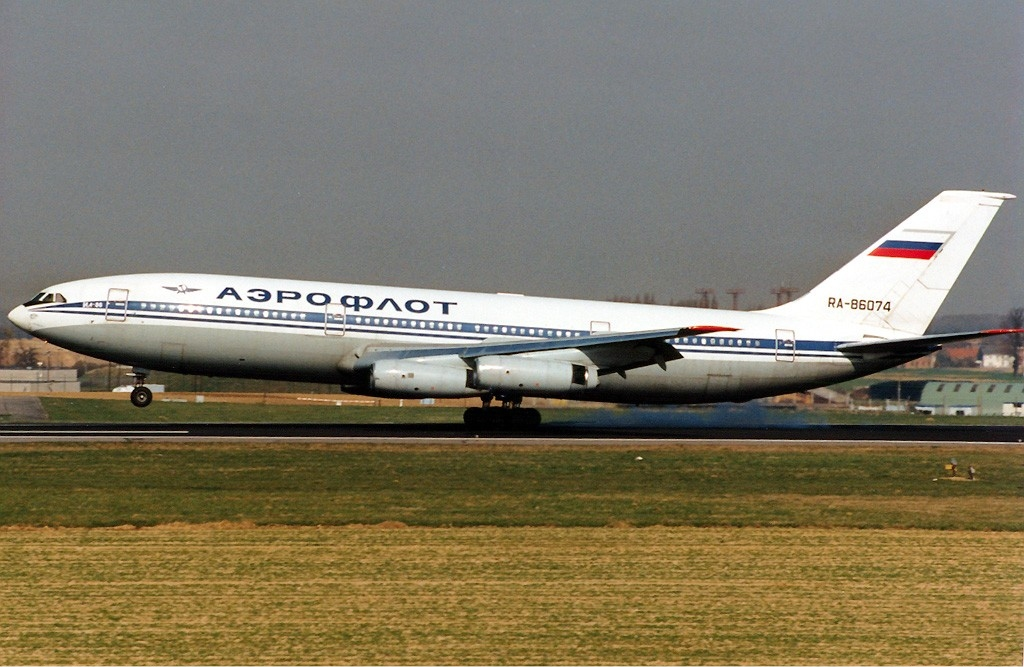
- RA-86074, the aircraft involved in the accident, photographed in 1993

Accident
- Date: 21 September 2001
- Summary: Pilot error, belly landing
- Site: Dubai International Airport, Dubai, United Arab Emirates

Aircraft
- Aircraft type: Ilyushin Il-86
- Operator: Aeroflot
- Call sign: AEROFLOT 521
- Registration: RA-86074
- Flight origin: Sheremetyevo International Airport, Moscow, Russia
- Destination: Dubai International Airport, Dubai, United Arab Emirates
- Occupants: 322
- Passengers: 307
- Crew: 15
- Fatalities: 0
- Survivors: 322

Aeroflot Flight 521 was a scheduled passenger flight operated by an Ilyushin Il-86 from Sheremetyevo International Airport to Dubai International Airport that, on 21 September 2001, belly landed at Dubai after the crew members forgot to activate the landing gear circuit breaker. All 322 on board survived.

== Aircraft ==
The accident aircraft was an Ilyushin Il-86, registration RA-86074. It first flew and also entered service in 1985. By the time of the accident, it had logged 23,711 flight hours with 7,132 pressurization cycles.

The crew consisted of four pilots and 11 flight attendants:

- Captain V. I. Ivochkin with 16,501 flight hours, of which 6,080 hours were on the Il-86
- First officer S. K. Sevastiyanov with 8,920 flight hours, of which 1,126 were on the Il-86
- Flight engineer E. A. Malinin
- Navigator S. N. Afanasyev.

== Accident ==
The flight from Moscow was uneventful. During the approach to Dubai, the crew switched off the landing gear circuit breaker for the flaps to be extended before landing gear extension, as this was a non-standard procedure meant to reduce noise. The flight engineer, Malinin, extended the gears, but they forgot to activate the landing gear circuit breaker before. Malinin violated the rules and did not realize the landing gears were still up.

At 20:09, Flight 521 made a belly landing on Runway 30R with the landing gears still retracted. The Il-86 skidded for a short distance before coming to a stop. Engine two, three, and the rear cargo compartment caught fire. The firefighters at the airport quickly extinguished the fire, and all 322 occupants were evacuated safely.

== Investigation ==
The Interstate Aviation Committee, Federal Air Transport Agency, Ilyushin, and Aeroflot took part in the investigation. The investigation concluded that the pilots initiated a poor approach configuration and violated several laws. The poor coordination and crew resource management contributed to the accident.

== Aftermath ==
Aeroflot had to pay each passenger an amount of money equivalent to 400 dollars as compensation. They also indemnified the Dubai International Airport 10 million dollars due to the airport halting operations for 13 hours as the Il-86 obstructed Runway 30R. The pilots lost their certificates, and the captain was fired.

The airframe was written off, used for parts, scrapped by 2003 and sank in the Persian Gulf.
