= Russian Sky Airlines =

Russian airline

IATA	ICAO	Call sign
P7	ESL	RADUGA
- Founded: 1995
- Ceased operations: 2005
- Hubs: Domodedovo International Airport
- Headquarters: Moscow, Russia

Russian Sky Airlines was an airline with its head office on the grounds of Domodedovo International Airport in Moscow, Russia. Its main base was Domodedovo International Airport. In late 2014 the airline announced it was filing for bankruptcy, and its license was revoked by Russian aviation authorities on December 24, 2014.

== History ==
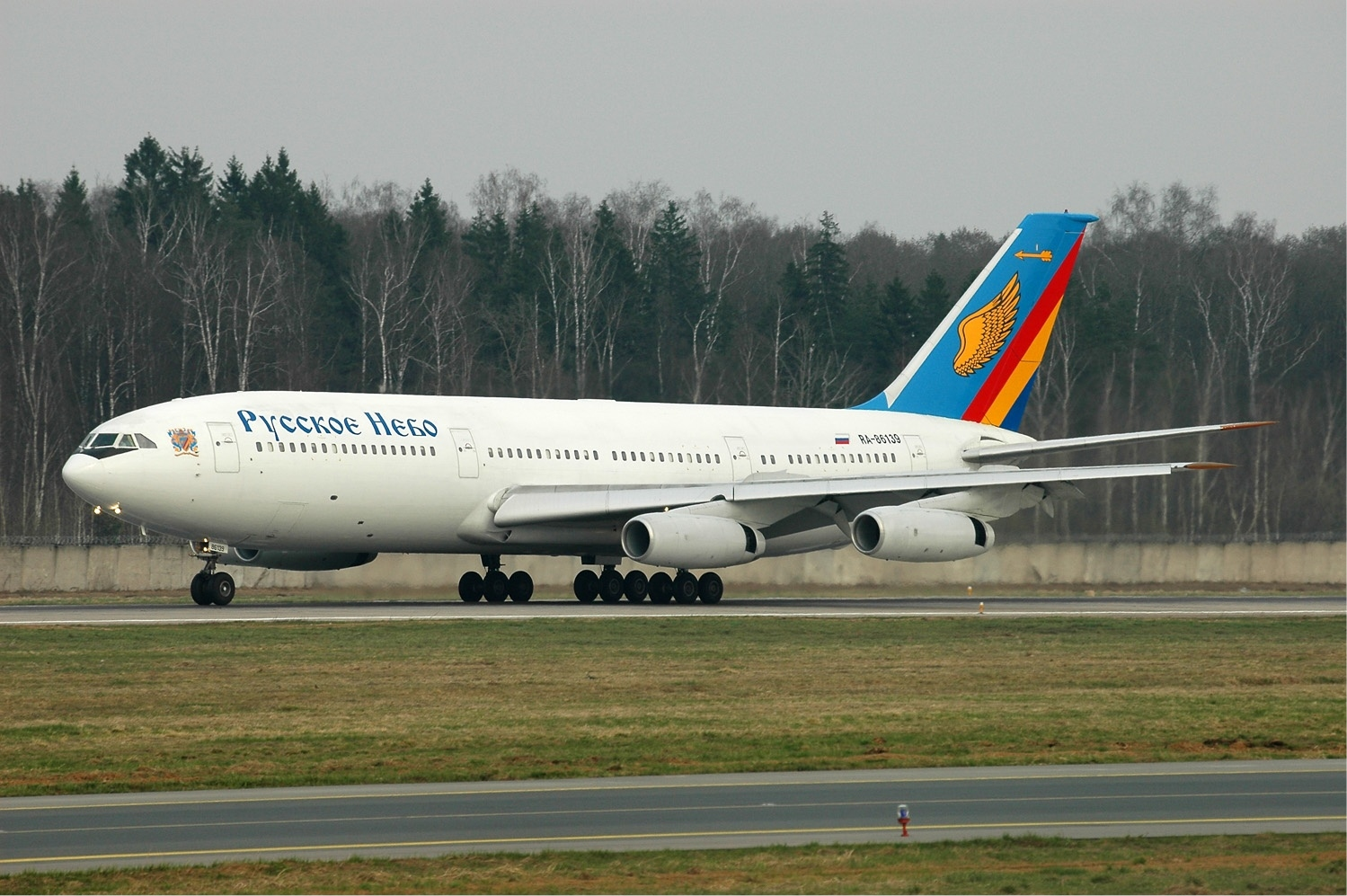
A Russian Sky Airlines Ilyushin Il-86 at Domodedovo Airport in 2005.

The airline was established on November 27, 1995 as East Line Air, that later on February 8, 1996 was granted Certificate No 61 by the civil aviation authorities of Russia. This Certificate had entitled the airline to operate all types of domestic civil aircraft. From January 3, 1996, East Line Air became a member of IATA. In 1997 the airline was renamed East Line Airlines, and a new Operator’s Certificate, retaining the same number, was approved on 4 September 1997, and subsequently renewed in compliance with the Federal Aviation Authorities regulations. East Line Airlines was a part of East Line group, which owns Domodedovo airport. They also were one of the leading cargo carriers in Russia.

In May 2004 a change of shareholders of East Line Airlines took place. The Extraordinary Meeting of Shareholders of East Line Airlines, held on June 7, 2004, resolved to delegate the authority of a sole executive body to a Managing Organization — Russian Sky Aviation Group, and on October 21, 2004 East Line Airlines was renamed Russian Sky Airlines without any change of the legal entity.

In 2005 the airline was acquired by VIM Airlines.

== Fleet ==
As of August 2006, the Russian Sky Airlines fleet included:

- 4 Ilyushin Il-76TD
- 1 Tupolev Tu-154M (leased from Bural, then to S7 Airlines)

=== Previously operated ===
As of January 2005 Russian Sky Airlines operated:

- 2 Antonov An-12
- 1 Ilyushin Il-62M
- 1 Ilyushin Il-76T
- 3 Ilyushin Il-86
- 1 Tupolev Tu-134A
- 1 Tupolev Tu-154B2
- 1 Yakovlev Yak-42
