= Rossair Executive Air Charter =

Airline based in Lanseria, South Africa

IATA	ICAO	Call sign
-	RSS	ROSS CHARTER
- Founded: 1956
- Ceased operations: 2005
- Fleet size: 23 (upon closure)
- Headquarters: Lanseria, South Africa

Rossair Executive Air Charter was an airline based in Lanseria, South Africa, operating chartered domestic and international passenger and cargo services, aiming at corporate and leisure markets. The airline was founded in 1956, and was shut down in 2005.

Rossair Europe was based in the Netherlands. It used ATR 42 and Beechcraft 1900 aircraft.

== Fleet ==
At January 2005, the Rossair fleet included the following small commuter aircraft:

- Four de Havilland Canada DHC-6 Twin Otter Series 300
- One Bombardier Learjet 35A
- One Cessna 208B Caravan-675
- Six Raytheon Beech 1900C Airliner
- Seven Raytheon Beech 1900D Airliner
- Two Raytheon Beech King Air 200
- One Raytheon Beech King Air B200
- One Raytheon Beech King Air C90B
