= Pulkovo Aviation Enterprise =

1932–2006 Russian airline

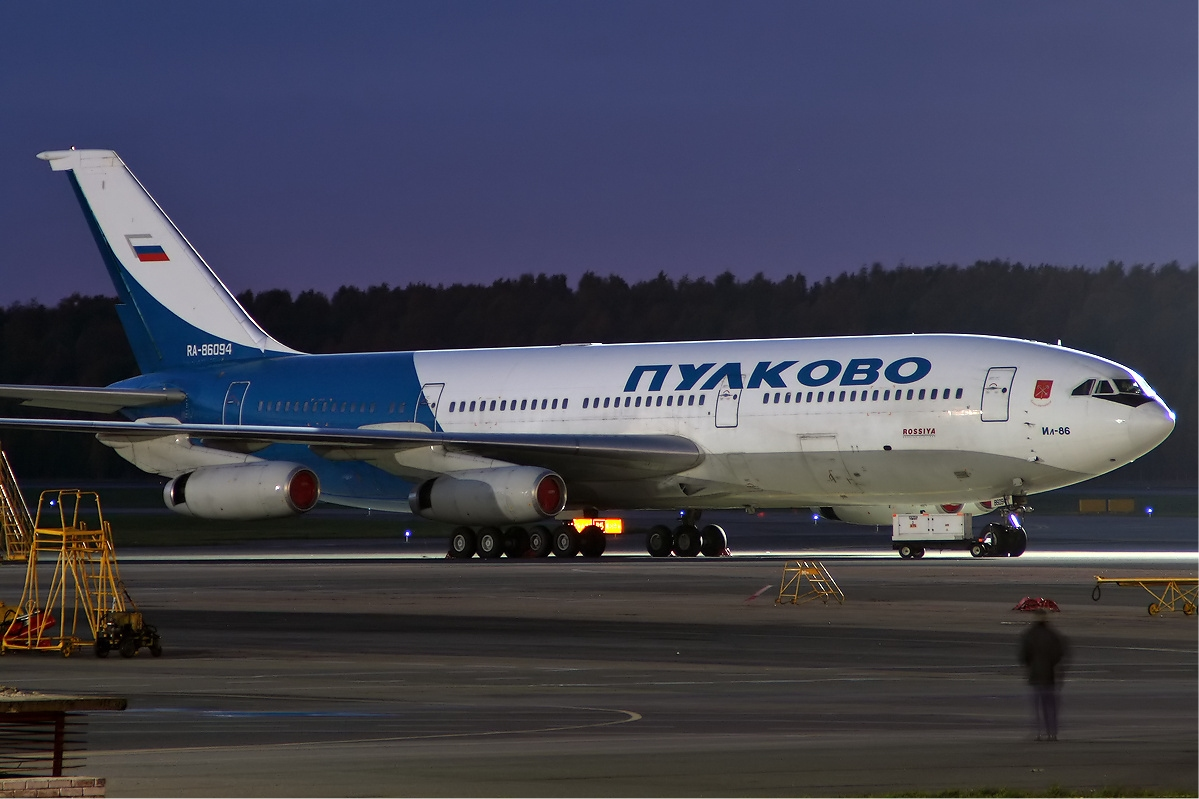
- Pulkovo Ilyushin Il-86 at Pulkovo Airport
IATA	ICAO	Call sign
FV	PLK	PULKOVO
- Founded: 24 June 1932
- Ceased operations: 29 October 2006 (merged with Rossiya)
- Fleet size: 52
- Destinations: 97 (34 countries)
- Parent company: Russia State Transport Company
- Website: eng.pulkovo.ru

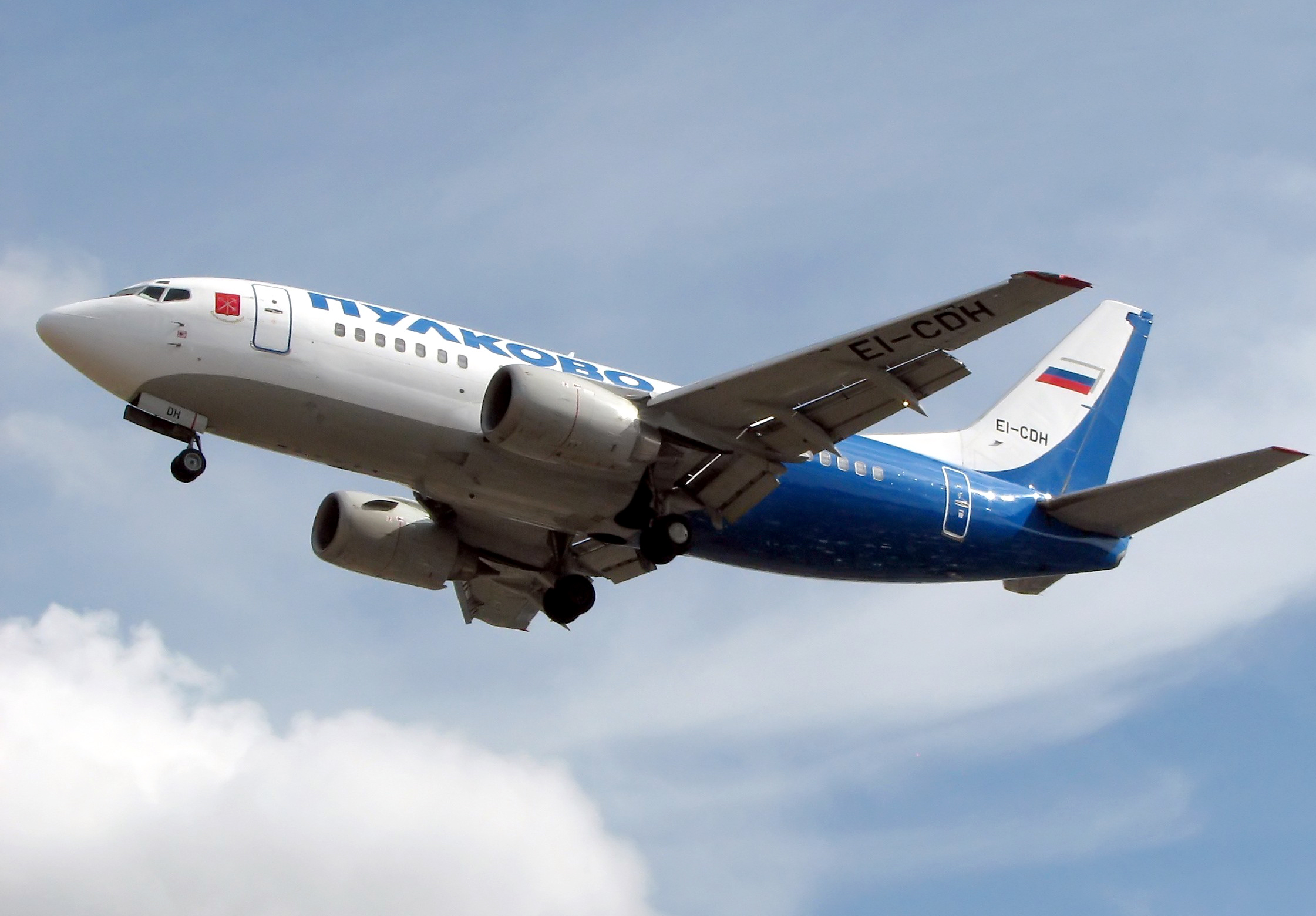
Pulkovo Boeing 737-500

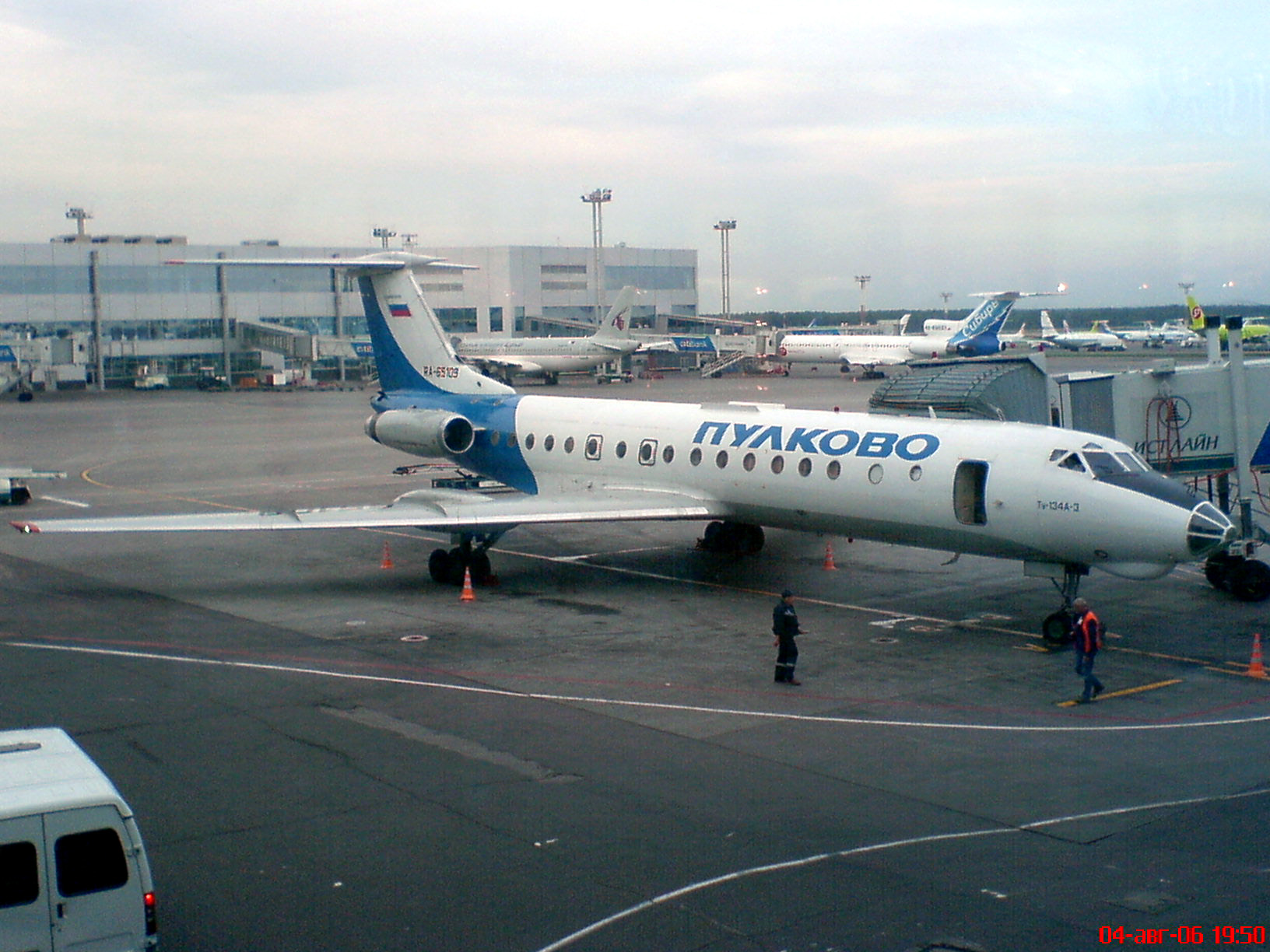
Pulkovo Tu-134A (Domodedovo Airport)

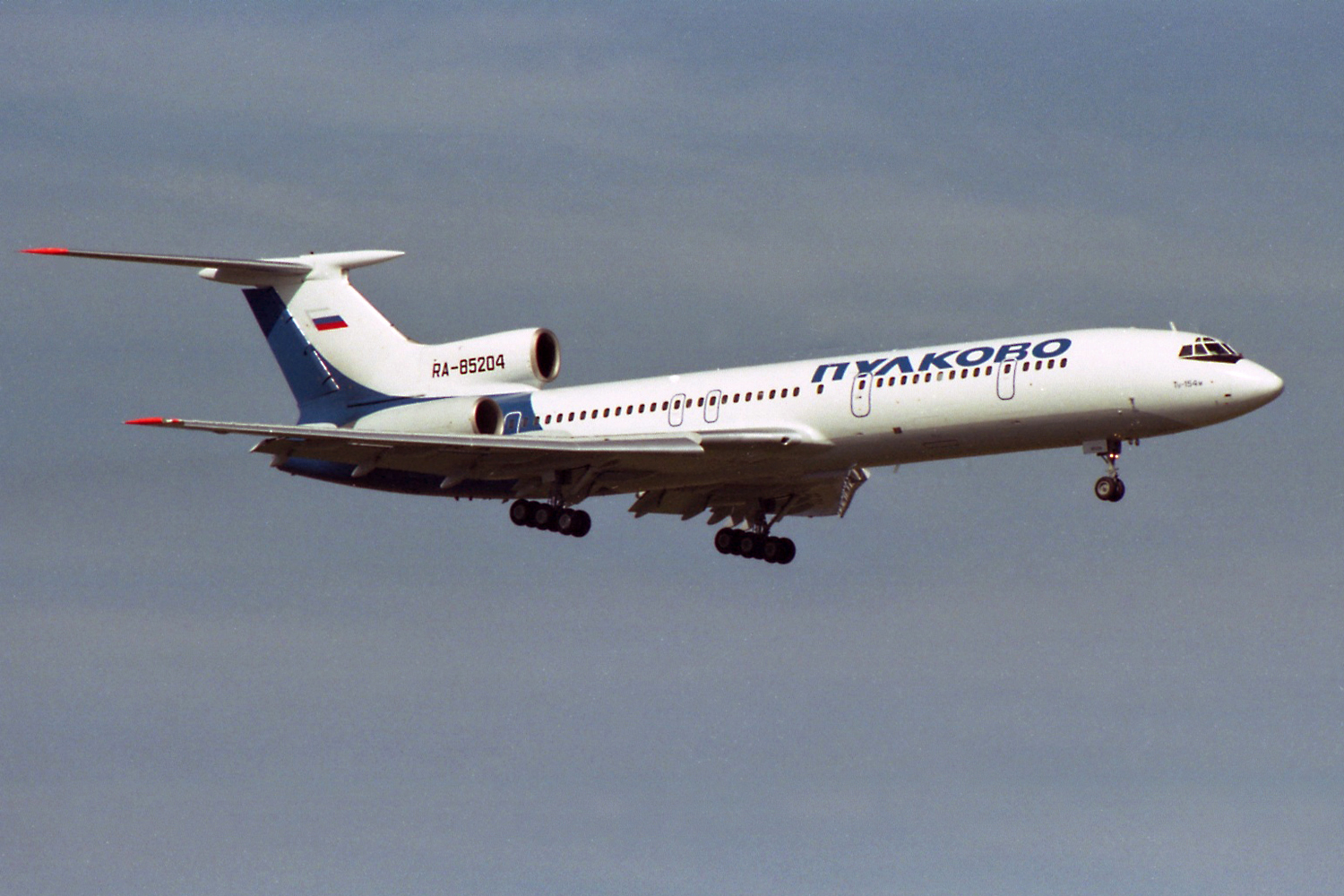
Pulkovo Tupolev Tu-154M RA-85204

Pulkovo Federal State Unified Aviation Service Company (ФГУАП “Пулково”) was an airline with its head office in Moskovsky District, Saint Petersburg, Russia. It operated the Pulkovo Airport and was 100% state owned. It was the third largest airline in Russia. On 29 October 2006 it completed a merger with government owned Federal State Unified Aviation Service Company to form a new company under the Rossiya name.

== History ==
The airline was named after the area where it is located, along with the village of Pulkovo and Pulkovo Observatory. The airline began on 24 June 1932 with the landing of two aircraft from Moscow at the newly constructed Shosseynaya Airport south of Leningrad. Air travel expanded rapidly, and in 1939 Shosseynaya Airport operated 29 routes, carrying 6,305 passengers, 708 tons of cargo, and over 333 tons of mail.

The airport became known as Pulkovo in the late 1950s. The airport complex consists of two separate terminals which are so far away from each other than can they can be classified as separate airports.

Pulkovo used the Aeroflot livery until ordered to change it in 1997 so to avoid ambiguity. It joined the IATA in June 2000.

In 2003, it employed about 7,000 workers, and in the first half of 2003, it carried 911,563 passengers, of 515,720 were domestic and 395,843 international and CIS passengers. It also carried 3,753.6 tons of cargo, of which 3,138.5 was domestic and 615.1 international and CIS (this last was an increase of 34% over the same period in 2002).

In 2006, Pulkovo completed its merger with Rossiya. They now operate as a single company.

== Incidents and accidents ==
- On 24 February 1994 Pulkovo Aviation Enterprise Flight 9045 crashed in poor weather conditions on approach to Nalchik Airport.
- 28 July 2002, at 3:25pm local time, Pulkovo Aviation Enterprise Flight 9560, an Ilyushin Il-86 registration RA-86060, crashed shortly after takeoff with 16 crew on board, from Moscow Sheremetyevo International Airport while on a repositioning flight to Saint Petersburg. Witnesses reported seeing the aircraft enter a steep climb immediately after takeoff, bank left, and crash into a forest near the end of the runway. Initial examination of the aircraft's Digital Flight Data Recorder indicates that, two seconds after liftoff, the plane's horizontal stabilizer spontaneously shifted to a full nose-up position. The Captain immediately pushed the control yoke fully forward in an attempt to lower the aircraft's nose, but was unsuccessful in doing so. Two flight attendants aboard survived.
- On 22 August 2006, Pulkovo Aviation Enterprise Flight 612, a Tu-154 airliner with 160 passengers and 10 crew on board en route from Anapa to Saint Petersburg, crashed near Donetsk in Ukraine. The flight crew attempted to navigate through high clouds containing an extremely powerful thunderstorm. The aircraft entered an uncontrolled spin and could not recover. Everyone on board died. The Interstate Aviation Committee (IAC) determined that the causes of the crash were airplane entering a stall condition due to excessive angle of attack and lack of airspeed in manual flight mode due to insufficient control and cooperation among the flight crew members.
