= Aeroflot accidents and incidents in the 1960s =

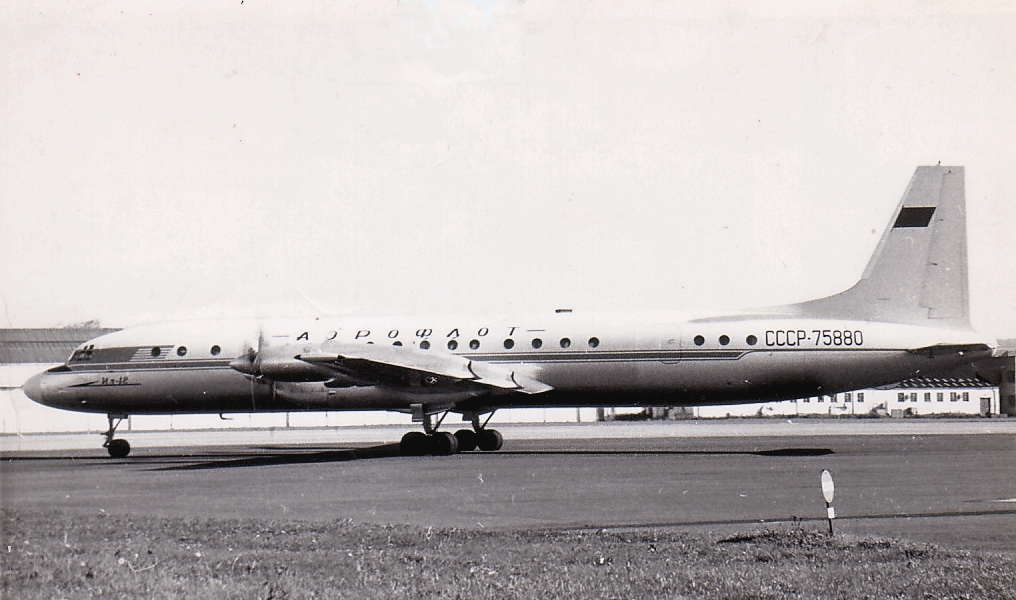
An Ilyushin Il-18V, similar to the one involved in the deadliest accident the carrier experienced during the decade, is seen here at Glasgow Prestwick Airport in the late 1960s.

Following is a list of accidents and incidents Aeroflot experienced in the 1960s. The deadliest event the Soviet Union's flag carrier went through in the decade occurred in November 1967, when an Ilyushin Il-18V crashed upside down shortly after takeoff from Koltsovo Airport in Sverdlovsk, then located in the Russian SSR, killing all 107 occupants on board, prompting the temporary grounding of the type within the airline's fleet. In terms of fatalities, the accident ranks as the fifth worst involving an Il-18, as of April 2016. Another aircraft of the type was involved in the second deadliest accident the airline experienced in the decade, this time in September 1964, when 87 people were killed when the aircraft struck a hillside on approach to Yuzhno-Sakhalinsk. The decade was also marked by the only deadly accident experienced by a Tupolev Tu-114, which entered commercial service on the Moscow–Khabarovsk route in April 1961.

The number of recorded fatalities aboard Aeroflot aircraft during the decade rose to 1801; likewise, 175 of its aircraft were written off in accidents or incidents, split into six Antonov An-10s, 13 Antonov An-12s, 54 Antonov An-2s, two Antonov An-6s, 8 Antonov An-24s, two Avia 14s, one Ilyushin Il-12, 22 Ilyushin Il-14s, 31 Ilyushin Il-18s, 12 Lisunov Li-2s, 14 Tupolev Tu-104s, two Tupolev Tu-114s, and five Tupolev Tu-124s. Most of the fatal accidents took place within the borders of the Soviet Union.

Certain Western media conjectured that the Soviet government was reluctant to publicly admit the occurrence of such events, which might render these figures higher, as fatal events would have only been admitted when there were foreigners aboard the crashed aircraft, the accident took place in a foreign country, or they reached the news for some reason. However, no significant amount of unreported serious accidents have emerged after the dissolution of the USSR, in any of its then-constituent republics.

== List ==
Date	Location	Aircraft	Tail number	Airline division	Aircraft damage	Fatalities	Description	Refs
15 January 1960	(Soviet Union) Didino	Li-2	CCCP-19405	Ural	W/O	1/4	The aircraft was being ferried from Sverdlovsk (now Yekaterinburg) to Moscow with a stop at Kazan. Thirty-two minutes after takeoff from Sverdlovsk, the pilot noticed that the aircraft begin turning to the right and also noticed that the pressure and revs in the right engine were dropping. After turning off the autopilot, the flight engineer reported that the right engine had failed. Despite the crew's efforts, the engine could not be restarted and the crew decided to return to Sverdlovsk and feathered the right propeller. The aircraft lost altitude during a left turn, and the crew began throwing cargo out of the aircraft in an attempt to slow its descent, but some of the larger cargo got stuck in the front door, worsening the aerodynamics but also causing a shift in the center of gravity. The aircraft was able to level out and continued flying, but the left engine began to overheat and later lost power, causing a loss of altitude. The aircraft slowly lost altitude until it struck trees and crashed.	
19 February 1960	(Soviet Union) Moma Airport	An-2T	CCCP-98332	Yakut	W/O	0/13	On takeoff, the aircraft entered a steep climb with a loss of airspeed. At 20 m (66 ft) the aircraft entered a spiraling dive and crashed next to the runway. The aircraft was overloaded and the center of gravity was too far to the rear.	
26 February 1960	(Soviet Union) Lvov	An-10A	CCCP-11180	Ukraine	W/O	32/33	Crashed on approach to Snilow Airport, 1,400 metres (4,600 ft) ahead of the runway threshold, in icing conditions. It was completing a domestic scheduled Kiev–Lviv passenger service as Flight 315.	
27 April 1960	(Soviet Union) Koltsovo Airport	Il-18A	CCCP-75648	Ural	W/O	1/5	The aircraft was being used for crew training, practicing approaches and landings. During the fifth approach, the rate of descent suddenly increased and the aircraft touched down hard, nosegear first after which it bounced and landed again nosegear first, breaking off the nosegear, bounced again and struck the runway, but the propellers had struck the runway. The aircraft skidded to the side of the runway and caught fire. The pilot showed a passive behavior during the approach and the instructor had little experience on the Il-18. The rear cargo hold was also loaded with too little ballast and this had moved the center of gravity too far forward.	
5 May 1960	(Soviet Union) Enken	Li-2	CCCP-84609	Far East	W/O	5/5	During a positioning flight from Nikolayevsk-on-Amure to Okhotsk, the aircraft encountered severe turbulence and snow. Ice formed on the wings and the aircraft lost speed and altitude until it struck the side of the 1,207 m (3,960 ft) high Dzhugdzur ridge at 900 m (3,000 ft).	
10 June 1960	(Soviet Union) near Tkvarcheli	Il-14P	CCCP-91571	North Caucasus	W/O	31/31	While en route to Tbilisi, the aircraft struck a mountain at 1,200 m (3,900 ft) after the crew deviated north of the flight route by 17 km (11 mi). The aircraft was operating a domestic scheduled Rostov-Sochi-Kutaisi-Tbilisi passenger service as Flight 207.	
5 July 1960	(Soviet Union) Aldan	An-2	CCCP-98282	Yakut	W/O	3/4	During an aerial photography flight, the pilot realized the aircraft was going to hit a hill. He turned the aircraft to go around the hill, but too late, after which the aircraft clipped a tree with its left wing, hit a second tree with its right wing and crashed in taiga and caught fire. The next day, the two surviving crew left in different directions to seek help. The flight operator was able to walk to a helicopter landing site and was flown to a hospital in Aldan, but the navigator was never seen again; his body was found on 16 July in taiga some 4 km (2.5 mi) from the crash site.	
20 July 1960	(Soviet Union) Off Syktyvkar	Il-14M	CCCP-61696	Komi	W/O	23/23	The aircraft was operating a domestic scheduled Leningrad–Syktyvkar passenger service as Flight 613 when it encountered heavy turbulence on its flight path and broke up, crashing 100 kilometres (62 mi) off the destination city.	
21 July 1960	(Soviet Union) Minsk	Il-12P	CCCP-01405	Ukraine	W/O	1+7/28	Crashed on takeoff from Minsk Airport. The aircraft failed to accelerate on the waterlogged grass runway and lifted off at too low a speed with a nose-high attitude. The aircraft bounced four times and then banked to the left, striking a power pole and a lamp post. Crashing into a motor depot, the aircraft struck several trucks and a fence and broke up. The aircraft was operating a domestic scheduled Leningrad-Minsk-Lviv passenger service as Flight 414.	
17 August 1960	(Soviet Union) Tarasovich	Il-18B	CCCP-75705	Soviet Gov't/Aeroflot	W/O	34/34	En route to Moscow, the crew reported that the number four propeller was feathered and requested an emergency landing at Borispol Airport. Five minutes later the crew reported that the number four engine and right wing were on fire and requested an emergency descent. ATC offered a diversion to nearby Zhuliany Airport. Control was lost and the aircraft crashed in a forest in a nose down, right bank attitude. The aircraft was operating an international scheduled Cairo–Moscow passenger service as Flight 036.	
21 August 1960	Unknown	Unknown	Unknown	Unknown	Unknown	1	Hijacking episode.	
2 September 1960	(Soviet Union) Zikhnovo	Il-14M	CCCP-04200	Polar	W/O	18/18	The aircraft was operating a non-scheduled passenger service carrying researchers from Mys Schmidta back to Moscow, when it crashed into mountainous terrain in bad weather while en route from Arkhangelsk to Cherepovets, 8 kilometres (5.0 mi) away from Zikhnovo.	
26 September 1960	(Soviet Union) Brest Airport	Il-14M	CCCP-41866	Belarus	W/O	1/27	Crashed on landing at Brest Airport. After passing Kobrin the right engine began to run rough and emitted black smoke. The crew shut down the engine, feathered the propeller, and continued to Brest. Due to poor weather at Brest the crew began circling. Unbeknownst to the crew, the aircraft had deviated from the approach and ATC ordered the crew to perform a go-around. Instead of a go-around, the crew continued the approach. The flaps and landing gear were lowered. ATC ordered a missed approach, but the crew did not respond and landed at high speed. The aircraft overran the runway and destroyed the VHF direction finder booth. The aircraft struck a pond, breaking off the nose gear. On the opposite bank of the pond the right engine separated. The aircraft came to a stop on the opposite side with a destroyed cockpit. The aircraft was completing a Moscow-Mogilev-Minsk-Brest passenger service as Flight 607.	
20 October 1960	(Soviet Union) Ust-Orda	Tu-104A	CCCP-42452	Far East	W/O	3/68	The aircraft was operating a scheduled Moscow-Omsk-Irkutsk-Khabarovsk passenger service as Flight 5. En route to Irkutsk, the aircraft diverted to Ust-Orda due to bad weather. The crew aborted the approach after the nose gear landing light malfunctioned. The pilot initiated a left turn to climb but the aircraft struck sloping terrain and caught fire.	
30 October 1960	(Soviet Union) Penza	Avia 14P	CCCP-52025	Privolzhsk	W/O	5/5	Crashed shortly after takeoff from Penza Airport. Despite worsening weather, including icing conditions, the aircraft took off. Ice formed on the wings and propellers. Both engines failed and the aircraft began to lose altitude until it struck a ravine with the left and then the right engine. The aircraft crashed in a plowed field and was destroyed by fire. The aircraft was operating a Leningrad-Penza-Saratov cargo service as Flight 534.	
11 November 1960	(Soviet Union) Zyryanka Airport	Li-2	CCCP-84748	Magadan	W/O	5/6	The aircraft took off from Zyryanka Airport despite a snow-covered runway. After a long takeoff run the aircraft achieved a nose-high attitude, stalled, and bounced on the runway several times, catching fire in the process, after which it continued to fly until it banked left and crashed in a snow-covered field 440 m (1,440 ft) past the runway. The aircraft was operating a Magadan–Seymchan–Zyryanka–Nizhny Kresty–Bilibino–Pevek cargo service as Flight 213.	
25 November 1960	(Soviet Union) Leningrad Region	Il-14FK	CCCP-91610	Northern	W/O	9/9	During a training flight, the instructor simulated a right engine failure while flying between two layers of cloud. The crew became disorientated and the aircraft entered a dive. The aircraft came out of the clouds at 200 m (660 ft), too low to allow recovery from the dive, and it crashed on a bank of a stream near Dachnoe.	
4 December 1960	(Soviet Union) Chernovo	Il-14M	CCCP-52091	Komi	W/O	14/14	Experienced a fire in the starboard engine while en route a domestic scheduled Syktyvkar–Moscow passenger service as Flight 61. This situation prompted the flightcrew to initiate a descent for an emergency landing, in which the wing broke off. The aircraft crashed near Chernovo.	
10 December 1960	(Soviet Union) Semipalatinsk	An-2T	CCCP-33181	Kazakhstan	W/O	12/12	The aircraft was operating a Semipalantinsk–Abai passenger service. Several passengers moved to the rear of the aircraft, causing the center of gravity to move past limits. The aircraft lost airspeed, stalled at 500 m (1,600 ft) and crashed.	
13 December 1960	(Soviet Union) Yamburg Airport	An-2T	CCCP-01245	Ural	W/O	0/3	Crashed on takeoff. The aircraft took off from a frozen river in strong crosswinds and an iced over upper wing leading edge. When the pilot forced the aircraft to lift off at low speed, the aircraft banked and turned to the left, striking the river bank and nosing over. Due to begin a Yamburg-Tazovsky cargo service.	
26 December 1960	(Soviet Union) Ulyanovsk Airport	Il-18A	CCCP-75651	Ulyanovsk Flight School	W/O	17/17	The aircraft was approaching Ulyanovsk when it suddenly nosed down at 120–150 metres (390–490 ft) after the crew selected 40 degrees of flaps due to tailplane icing, after which the aircraft crashed in a plowed field and caught fire. Test flights later showed that the Il-18 was vulnerable in icing conditions.	
3 January 1961	(Soviet Union) Santash Pass	An-2SKh	CCCP-25482	Kyrgyzstan	W/O	9/9	At Przhevalsk Airport, seven passengers boarded the aircraft. After passing the Santash Pass, the weather worsened and visibility dropped below minimum. The pilot descended below the clouds without ATC permission and the aircraft later struck a snow-covered hill.	
17 January 1961	(Soviet Union) Pervoye Maya	Li-2	CCCP-84694	North Caucasus	W/O	5/5	During an atmospheric sounding flight, the inexperienced pilot allowed a loss of airspeed at 5,200 m (17,100 ft). The aircraft stalled and entered a nosedive. The pilot attempted to regain control, but he could not and the aircraft crashed.	
23 January 1961	(Soviet Union) Dnepropetrovsk Airport	Avia 14P	CCCP-61610	Ukraine	W/O	0/34	Crashed 150 m (490 ft) short of the runway on final approach following a premature descent. The aircraft was operating a Lugansk-Stalino (now Donetsk)-Dnepropetrovsk (now Dnipro)-Kiev domestic scheduled passenger service as Flight 95.	
30 January 1961	(Soviet Union) Stalingrad	Il-14M	CCCP-41858	North Caucasus	W/O	1/4	During a training flight out of Stalingrad, the check pilot simulated an engine failure shortly after takeoff without informing the rest of the crew, which was against procedure. The pilot mistook the loss of power for an actual engine failure and ordered the engine shut down and its propeller feathered. The aircraft banked left, stalled and crashed.	
1 February 1961	(Soviet Union) Vladivostok Airport	Tu-104A	CCCP-42357	MUTA	W/O	0/58	The aircraft was completing a Moscow–Khabarovsk–Vladivostok passenger service as Flight 01. While on approach to Vladivostok, the aircraft was too high. The right engine was shut down, unbeknownst to the crew. The pilot increased the angle of descent and the aircraft touched down too late and too fast. The brakes were ineffective due to the high speed and the brakes were applied, but the pilot did not use much braking to avoid tire blowouts. The pilot then began turning and ran off the runway and the left engine was shut down. The aircraft struck two trucks before crashing into a ditch.	
16 March 1961	(Soviet Union) Sverdlovsk	Tu-104B	CCCP-42438	West Siberia	W/O	5/51	The aircraft was operating a domestic scheduled Khabarovsk-Sverdlovsk-Leningrad passenger service as Flight 068. The right engine failed shortly after takeoff. The crew were unable to determine which engine failed because they could not read the instruments due to severe vibration. A crew member manipulated the left engine throttle to attempt to hear the difference in engine power to determine which engine had failed, but the engine was shut down by mistake. The aircraft lost altitude and the crew made a forced landing on a frozen pond. Two people on the ground died when a home was destroyed.	
17 March 1961	(Soviet Union) Ufa	Li-2T	CCCP-54783	Privolzhsk	W/O	2/4	The aircraft took off from Ufa in poor weather and failed to gain sufficient speed. Despite this, the pilot rotated the aircraft, but it pitched up, causing a tail strike. After bouncing several times, the aircraft crash landed and overran the runway. The wings and tail were covered in snow. Due to begin the second leg of a Kazan–Ufa–Chelyabinsk–Omsk–Novosibirsk–Tomsk cargo service as Flight 747.	
4 April 1961	(Soviet Union) Dovyren	An-2T	CCCP-01248	Arkhangelsk	W/O	2/2	The aircraft was beginning a Nizhneangarsk-Dovyren-Irkana-Nizhneangarsk cargo service, carrying six diesel drums. Twelve minutes after takeoff, the crew radioed that they were climbing to 1,200 m (3,900 ft) in good weather. Ten minutes later the aircraft crashed in a mountainous area near Dovyren; wreckage was found the next day. A propeller blade had broken off due to a manufacturing defect and hit and broke the windshield. The crew could not make an emergency landing due to the terrain.	
18 April 1961	(Soviet Union) Novoye Akhperdino	An-2T	CCCP-47614	Privolzhsk	W/O	1/2	The aircraft was spraying crops. After three flights, the pilot was flying at 10 m (33 ft) following a 500 m (1,600 ft) straight-in path when the aircraft banked left and crashed.	
24 April 1961	(Soviet Union) Stepanavan	An-2T	CCCP-98247	Armenia	W/O	16/19	The aircraft was operating a Yerevan-Stepanavan passenger service. Weather during the first part of the flight was poor and marginal, with rain and clouds. During a left turn the aircraft struck the side of a mountain 10 km (6.2 mi) southwest of Stepanavan Airport. The aircraft was reportedly overloaded: the An-2 was designed for 12 passengers, not 17.	
5 June 1961	(Soviet Union) Chita	Il-14G	CCCP-61732	East Siberia	W/O	5/5	The aircraft was operating an Irkutsk–Chita–Khabarovsk cargo service. During the approach to Chita, the aircraft was too low and struck trees and crashed on the side of Mount Cherskogo (11 km (6.8 mi) short of the runway). The crew had begun descending too soon.	
22 June 1961	(Soviet Union) Bogoroditsk	Il-18B	CCCP-75672	MUTA	W/O	0/97	Belly landed in a field following a fire in the inner starboard engine that was not extinguished. The aircraft was operating a domestic scheduled Moscow-Sochi service.	
8 July 1961	(Soviet Union) Sosnovy Bor	Il-14P	CCCP-41848	Ukraine	W/O	9/26	Crashed due to fuel exhaustion after the crew failed to refuel before takeoff. The aircraft was operating a domestic scheduled Kazan-Sverdlovsk passenger service as Flight 411.	
10 July 1961	(Soviet Union) Odesa	Tu-104B	CCCP-42447	Northern	W/O	1/94	Encountered downdrafts and struck approach lights on final approach to Odesa Airport in heavy rain. The aircraft was operating a domestic scheduled Leningrad-Odessa passenger service as Flight 381.	
13 August 1961	(Soviet Union) Riga	Il-18B	CCCP-75653	Ulyanovsk Flight School	W/O	0/8	Overshot the runway on landing at Riga International Airport in fog.	
17 September 1961	(Soviet Union) Tashkent	Tu-104A	CCCP-42388	Uzbekistan	W/O	0	Hard landing at Tashkent Airport.	
22 September 1961	(Soviet Union) Oymyakon	Li-2	CCCP-16154	Yakut	W/O	6/6	Crashed 95 kilometres (59 mi) away from Oymyakon after running out of fuel. The aircraft was operating a Yakutsk-Oymyakon cargo service.	
28 September 1961	(Soviet Union) Yakutsk Airport	Li-2	CCCP-63857	East Siberia	W/O	0	Struck in the tail by Li-2T CCCP-71199 that had veered off the runway; CCCP-63857 was written off.	
31 October 1961	(Soviet Union) Smorodinny	Il-14M	CCCP-61712	Yakut	W/O	5/5	The aircraft was operating a Yakutsk–Sangar cargo service. The crew mistook the lights of Smorodinny for the lights of the destination city during a blackout. It descended until 150 metres (490 ft), where it crashed into mountainous terrain.	
2 November 1961	(Soviet Union) Vladivostok	Tu-104B	CCCP-42504	Far East	W/O	0	Made an emergency landing following an engine failure after hitting an antenna on approach to Vladivostok Airport.	
17 December 1961	(Soviet Union) Chebotovka	Il-18B	CCCP-75654	MUTA	W/O	59/59	Crashed 10 kilometres (6.2 mi) off Chebotovka, after the flight engineer inadvertently modified the position of the flaps at a cruising altitude of 8,000 metres (26,000 ft), causing the aircraft to dive uncontrollably. The aircraft was en route a domestic scheduled Moscow–Sochi passenger service as Flight 245.	
31 December 1961	(Soviet Union) Mineralnye Vody	Il-18V	CCCP-75757	Armenia	W/O	32/119	The aircraft was operating a non-scheduled Tbilisi-Mineralnye Vody passenger service. It was one of two Il-18s chartered to pick up passengers in Tbilisi who had been stranded for several days due to bad weather. The boarding process was chaotic and disorganized, with tickets not being checked. The aircraft was also overloaded. Despite all this, the flight was without incident. While on approach at 250 m (820 ft), the crew reported that they did not see the runway or approach lights. The pilot aborted the approach and made a go-around. The aircraft turned to the right and crashed in hilly terrain.	
16 January 1962	(Soviet Union) Ulyanovsk	An-2T	CCCP-23721	Magadan	W/O	0/6	The aircraft was operating an Egvekinot-Anadyr mail flight. On approach to Anadyr, weather conditions were poor with low visibility due to clouds. During the final segment, the pilot noticed a man walking on the runway and began a right turn to avoid him. The aircraft stalled and crashed. The man was sent to light a fire to guide the aircraft on approach.	
21 January 1962	(Soviet Union) Levinskaya Verkhoshizhemsky	An-2T	CCCP-01218	Northern	W/O	10/10	The aircraft was beginning a Kirov–Sovetsk–Arbazh–Pizhanka–Kishma–Yaransk–Sanshursk passenger service. After being delayed for several days due to weather, the aircraft took off for Sovetsk. But en route at 150 m (490 ft) with visibility of 2–4 km (1.2–2.5 mi), the aircraft collided with another Aeroflot An-2 (CCCP-02142). CCCP-02142 only suffered minor damage and continued to Kirov while CCCP-01218 crashed out of control.	
27 January 1962	(Soviet Union) Farikha	An-2T	CCCP-98330	Northern	W/O	1/3	Shortly after takeoff, the pilot began turning left when the aircraft banked left, stalled and crashed. Due to begin a Farikha–Naryan-Mar cargo service.	
27 January 1962	(Soviet Union) Ulyanovsk	An-10	CCCP-11148	Ulyanovsk Flight School	W/O	13/14	Shortly after takeoff from Baratayevka Airport on a training flight, the outer starboard engine did not feather during initial climb out, causing the aircraft to bank right and lose speed, eventually crashing into the ground 1 kilometre (0.62 mi) off the airport.	
15 February 1962	(Soviet Union) Shymkent	Li-2T	CCCP-84575	Kazakhstan	W/O	0	The overloaded aircraft took off from a soggy grass runway. The pilot began the takeoff run early as he feared the aircraft would get stuck. Just before the end of the runway, the pilot lifted off too soon and at low speed. The aircraft entered a nose-high, low-speed attitude, entered a descending turn, struck a ditch next to the runway and crashed outside the airport.	
21 February 1962	(Soviet Union) Mount Karpung	An-2T	CCCP-47645	Magadan	W/O	3/3	The aircraft was operating a Pevek-Palyavaam cargo service. Another An-2 approaching Palyavaam radioed that it was impossible to land due to poor weather and returned to Pevek. ATC attempted to contact CCCP-47645, but there was no response and the aircraft was declared missing. Wreckage was found five days later at 450 m (1,480 ft) on the side of Mount Karpung (some 140 km (87 mi) southeast of Pevek), 20 km (12 mi) south of the flight route. The crew was probably flying VFR in IMC conditions.	
9 March 1962	(Soviet Union) Baygubekmuryn Cape	Li-2	CCCP-84717	Kazakhstan	W/O	3/10	The aircraft was operating an ice reconnaissance flight over the Aral Sea. At 800 m (2,600 ft) the aircraft flew into clouds and the pilot descended to maintain visual contact with the sea surface, but at 400 m (1,300 ft) the aircraft encountered fog. The pilot descended again, but the aircraft struck the ground and crashed. The crew was flying VFR in IMC conditions.	
20 March 1962	(Soviet Union) Kikhshik	An-2T	CCCP-93473	Far East	W/O	1/7	After takeoff for the second leg of a Petropavlovsk-Kamchatsky–Ust-Bolsheretsk–Kikhshik–Petropavlovsk-Kamchatsky passenger flight, the crew was told to return to Ust-Bolsheretsk if they encountered snow. A few minutes into the flight, weather worsened with snow and clouds. Despite this, the pilot decided to continue to Kikhshik while flying too low. Approaching Kikhshik the pilot attempted to land and began a steep left turn, but he lost control and the aircraft crashed. The crew had disobeyed ATC instructions and were flying VFR in IMC conditions.	
30 March 1962	(Soviet Union) Kirensk	Li-2	CCCP-84685	East Siberia	W/O	0	Shortly after takeoff, the cargo door opened. The pilot left his seat to close the door, but he had not transferred control to the co-pilot and the now out-of-control aircraft began descending. When the co-pilot gained control, the aircraft struck a telephone pole and crashed.	
4 April 1962	Unknown	Il-14P	CCCP-41852	West Siberia	W/O	0	Severely damaged after the left flap failed to extend on landing during a training flight.	
15 April 1962	(Soviet Union) Mount Karpung	An-2SKh	CCCP-23700	Magadan	W/O	0/2	The aircraft was being ferried from Palyavaam to Pevek. The crew did not follow the Palyavaam River but deviated to the left by 12 km (7.5 mi). Encountering poor visibility (snow), the aircraft struck the side of Mount Karpung.	
19 April 1962	(Soviet Union) Taldy-Kurgan	An-2	CCCP-02168	Kazakhstan	W/O	3/8	The aircraft was operating an Alma-Ata (now Almaty)–Arasan (and return) passenger flight. A few minutes after takeoff from Taldy-Kurgan for the second leg to Kapal, weather worsened and the crew failed to return as they were told to by ATC. In low visibility, the pilot descended to 1,100 m (3,600 ft), but the aircraft struck the side of Mount Eskiulmes (30 km (19 mi) northeast of Taldy-Kurgan).	
11 May 1962	(Soviet Union) Magadan	An-2R	CCCP-49262	Magadan	W/O	2/2	The aircraft was spraying crops at the "Duksha" sovkhoz (state farm) some 72 km (45 mi) north of Magadan. Five to six minutes after takeoff and flying to the spraying area, the pilot began a right turn on approach to a forest. The right wing struck tree tops and the aircraft stalled and crashed near the Khasyn River and burned out. The aircraft was flying too low.	
24 May 1962	(Soviet Union) Gorki	Li-2	CCCP-54997	MUTA	W/O	20/21	During climbout from Strigino Airport, the left engine failed, probably due to carburetor problems. The propeller could not be feathered and the pilot decided to make an emergency landing and was forced to make a sharp left turn to avoid a building and a factory's chimney. The aircraft then banked left, touched the ground with its left wingtip and crashed. Due to complete the final leg of a Magnitogorsk–Ufa–Kazan–Gorki–Moscow passenger service as Flight 56.	
3 June 1962	(Soviet Union) Karaul-Kuyu	An-2T	CCCP-07968	Turkmenistan	W/O	1/2	The aircraft was operating a Chardzhou (now Türkmenabat)-Mary cargo service, carrying 40 bottles of sulfuric acid. Eighteen minutes after takeoff, at 900 m (3,000 ft), smoke spread in the cabin and a fire started. The pilot attempted to extinguish the fire, but he could not and descended to attempt an emergency landing, but the aircraft struck a small sand dune and crashed and burned out. The sulfuric acid, which was not properly packaged, had ignited during the flight.	
4 June 1962	(Bulgaria) Sofia	Tu-104B	CCCP-42491	MUTA	W/O	5/5	Experienced an unexplained failure of the left engine shortly after takeoff from Vrazhdebna Airport, prompting the crew to return to the airport. In doing so, the airplane flew too low through clouds and crashed into mountainous terrain, 30 kilometres (19 mi) northeast of the airport. Due to operate a Sofia–Moscow cargo service.	
20 June 1962	(Soviet Union) Kutaisi	An-2T	CCCP-32619	Georgia	W/O	2/2	The aircraft was being ferried back to Kutaisi after dropping off passengers at Tsagueri. En route, weather worsened and approaching a mountain at 850 m (2,790 ft) the crew flew into clouds. The aircraft struck tree tops and crashed in a wooded area on a mountain. The crew had begun descending too soon.	
28 June 1962	(Soviet Union) Ksenyevka	An-2T	CCCP-13653	Kazakhstan	W/O	3/4	The aircraft was spraying crops at Ksenyevka sovkhoz (state farm), some 160 km (99 mi) northeast of Kostenay. After takeoff, the pilot began a steep climb and then a sharp left turn at low altitude. Because the aircraft was flying too slow, it stalled and crashed and caught fire.	
30 June 1962	(Soviet Union) Voznesenka	Tu-104A	CCCP-42370	Far East	W/O	84/84	Accidentally shot down by a training missile while en route from Irkutsk to Omsk as Flight 902.	
3 July 1962	(Soviet Union) Gayvoron	An-2R	CCCP-05833	Far East	W/O	2/2	The aircraft was spraying crops in the Spassk-Dalny region and returned to Gayvoron to resupply with 375 kg (827 lb) of pollination products. A second resupply flight was made later, after which the aircraft took off to spray a wheat field. While flying at 6–7 m (20–23 ft) the pilot made a left turn when the left wing struck the ground and the aircraft crashed. The aircraft was flying too low during the turn.	
6 July 1962	(Soviet Union) Off Tashkent	Il-14M	CCCP-91554	Uzbekistan	W/O	11/38	The aircraft was completing a domestic scheduled Bukhara–Tashkent passenger service as Flight 40, when the starboard wing broke off after hitting a fence, following the loss of height amid an engine failure, causing the aircraft to crash 34 kilometres (21 mi) away from Tashkent Airport.	
7 July 1962	(Soviet Union) Tonkeris	An-2SKh	CCCP-70889	Kazakhstan	W/O	2/2	The aircraft was spraying crops on a field owned by the Tonkeris kolkhoz (state farm). After seven flights, the crew prepared for the eighth flight. After a straight-in flight at low altitude, the pilot began a right turn when control was lost for reasons unknown. The aircraft crashed.	
28 July 1962	(Soviet Union) Sochi	An-10A	CCCP-11186	Ukraine	W/O	81/81	Crashed at 2,000 feet (610 m) into a mountain while on approach to Sochi Airport in clouds, inbound from Simferopol as Flight 415.	
7 August 1962	(Soviet Union) Moscow	Tu-114D	CCCP-76479	MUTA	W/O	0/0	Nosegear retraction while standing on the apron at Vnukovo Airport undergoing maintenance.	
16 August 1962	(Soviet Union) Kishinev Airport	An-2T	CCCP-98218	Moldova	W/O	0/0	The aircraft were written off after being blown over in a storm while parked at the airport.	
16 August 1962	(Soviet Union) Kishinev Airport	Li-2T	CCCP-65680	Moldova	W/O	0/0	The aircraft were written off after being blown over in a storm while parked at the airport.	
16 August 1962	(Soviet Union) Kishinev Airport	Li-2P	CCCP-54920	Moldova	W/O	0/0	The aircraft were written off after being blown over in a storm while parked at the airport.	
3 September 1962	(Soviet Union) Off Khabarovsk	Tu-104A	CCCP-42366	Far East	W/O	86/86	The aircraft became uncontrollable after rolling and yawing several times at an altitude of 4,500 metres (14,800 ft). Crashed in a swamp, some 90 kilometres (56 mi) away from Khabarovsk. Due to operate a domestic scheduled Khabarovsk–Petropavlovsk-Kamchatsky passenger service as Flight 03.	
18 September 1962	(Soviet Union) near Cherskiy	Il-14M	CCCP-61628	Magadan	W/O	32/32	While en route to Berelakh, the weather worsened and the aircraft stayed overnight at Berelakh. The next day the aircraft continued to Zyryanka, but had to stay there for two days because of bad weather at Cherskiy. The next day the aircraft departed for Bilibino. The approach procedure called for a circling climb to the proper altitude, but the crew failed to follow the procedure and instead headed for mountainous terrain while flying too low. The aircraft entered clouds at 800 m (2,600 ft) and collided with a mountainside at 975 m (3,199 ft). The aircraft was operating a domestic scheduled Magadan-Berelakh-Zyryanka-Cherskiy-Bilibino service as Flight 213.	
25 October 1962	(Soviet Union) Moscow	Tu-104B	CCCP-42495	MUTA	W/O	10/10	On a test flight, the aircraft crashed at Sheremetyevo Airport upon takeoff. The rudder controls were apparently cross-connected.	
1 November 1962	(Soviet Union) Ribnoye	Li-2	CCCP-54970	East Siberia	W/O	9/9	The aircraft was on a positioning flight from Chita to Minsk. During the Krasnoyarsk-Novosibirsk leg, weather conditions worsened and the pilot requested to climb due to icing conditions, but ATC denied this. While flying at 900–1,500 m (3,000–4,900 ft), control was lost due to icing and the aircraft entered a nosedive and crashed. Wreckage was found on 29 May 1963.	
19 November 1962	(Soviet Union) Tynne	An-2SKh	CCCP-07920	Ukraine	W/O	9/9	After spraying crops at a sovkhoz near Tynne, the crew took six farmers of the sovkhoz on a tour, all of whom were drunk. Five minutes after takeoff at 130 m (430 ft), the pilot made a sharp turn (apparently to avoid a chalet) when the six passengers drifted to the rear of the aircraft, causing the center of gravity to move too far to the rear. The aircraft pitched up, stalled and crashed.	
29 November 1962	Unknown	Il-18V	CCCP-75843	MUTA	W/O	Unknown	Crashed.	
18 December 1962	(Soviet Union) Olyokminsk	Li-2T	CCCP-84603	Yakut	W/O	4/4	The aircraft was operating a Yakutsk-Olyokminsk cargo service. During the approach to Olyokminsk, the crew encountered poor weather and followed the Sinyaya River instead of the Lena River. Because of this, the crew began descending too soon and was too low when passing the outer marker. The aircraft struck the side of a wooded hill.	
19 December 1962	(Soviet Union) Kazan	An-2T	CCCP-15939	Privolzhsk	W/O	1/13	While approaching Kazan, the engine failed due to contaminated fuel. Flying low and facing power lines, the pilot decided to descend below them and make an emergency landing on a highway. After touching down the aircraft struck a metal slide and obstacles before crashing. Due to complete a Kamskoye Ustye-Kazan passenger service as Flight 563.	
14 January 1963	(Soviet Union) Tazovskoye	Li-2	CCCP-71186	Ural	W/O	12/25	Lost control, banked right and crashed shortly after takeoff. ATC personnel were reportedly drunk and sleep-deprived. Due to begin a Tazovskoye-Salekhard passenger service as Flight 76.	
27 January 1963	(Soviet Union) Seymchan	Li-2	CCCP-16194	Magadan	W/O	4/4	The aircraft was operating the second leg of a Pevek-Zyrianka-Seymchan-Magadan cargo flight. Due to strong winds, the aircraft deviated from the flight route and neither the crew nor ATC realized this. Approaching a mountainous area in poor weather, the aircraft encountered downdrafts. Altitude was lost and the aircraft descended to 1,820 m (5,970 ft) before it struck the side of Mount Tuonnyakh. Wreckage was found four days later.	
31 January 1963	(Soviet Union) Leninakan	An-2T	CCCP-28900	Armenia	W/O	13/13	The aircraft was operating the second leg of a Yerevan-Leninakan (now Gyumri)-Akhalkalaki passenger service. Eight minutes into the flight in good weather, the crew radioed their position to ATC. Four minutes after this, the aircraft lost altitude, climbed, banked left and right and finally nosed down and crashed in a 90° nose dive near Sesapar (30 km (19 mi) north of Leninakan). The cause of the crash was not determined, but a too-rear center of gravity, control cable failure or an attack on the crew were theorized.	
1 February 1963	(Soviet Union) Kirovograd	Li-2T	CCCP-71229	Kirovograd AFTC	W/O	4/11	The aircraft was on a training flight from Malaya Viska-Kirovograd (now Kropyvnytskyi). Approaching Kirovograd, the crew encountered poor weather with limited visibility due to fog, which was worse than forecast. On final approach, the instructor was unable to locate the runway and continued the approach, but he did not realize that the aircraft had banked right. Altitude was lost and the aircraft crashed.	
8 February 1963	(Soviet Union) Syktyvkar	An-10A	CCCP-11193	Komi	W/O	7/7	Stalled and crashed upon takeoff, following the icing of the intake in three of the engines.	
26 February 1963	(Soviet Union) Bukhta Yemlinskaya	Il-18V	CCCP-75732	Polar	W/O	10/10	The aircraft was operating a Cape Schmidt-Anadyr-Magadan cargo service. While en route to Magadan both left side engines failed at 7,000 metres (23,000 ft). The crew made an emergency landing on the icy surface of Shelikhov Gulf near Bukhta Yemlinskaya. The aircraft was destroyed and sank. Three occupants survived the crash but later died in the below-zero temperatures.	
5 March 1963	(Soviet Union) Ashgabat	Il-18V	CCCP-75765	Turkmenistan	W/O	12/55	Inbound from Krasnovodsk as Flight 191, struck power lines on approach to Ashgabat Airport, crashed some 300–200 metres (980–660 ft) short of the runway, broke up, and caught fire.	
12 March 1963	(Antarctica) Richardson Lakes	An-6	CCCP-98341	Polar	W/O	0/0	Damaged in a storm while participating in the 6th Soviet Antarctic expedition in 1962–1963. Four days later the aircraft suffered more damage in a second storm.	
1 April 1963	(Soviet Union) Donetsk	Li-2T	CCCP-63825	Ukraine	W/O	1/5	The aircraft was on a night training flight out of Donetsk Airport. After five flights, the crew began a sixth flight in low visibility due to poor weather. On final approach, the pilot decided to continue the descent after passing the decision height despite being unable to distinguish the runway lights. The aircraft struck trees, banked right and crashed.	
2 April 1963	(Soviet Union) Magadan	An-12	CCCP-11338	North Caucasus	W/O	0	Ran off the snowy runway at Magadan Airport and broke in two after the pilot failed to correctly align the aircraft for takeoff.	
4 April 1963	(Soviet Union) Urakhcha	Il-18V	CCCP-75866	Krasnoyarsk	W/O	67/67	The pitch control mechanism on engine four failed while en route a domestic scheduled Moscow–Krasnoyarsk passenger service as Flight 25. Unable to determine which of the right side propellers were causing the drag forces, the crew decided to feather both of them, causing the aircraft to enter a high speed descent in which the elevators broke off. The airplane crashed 3.5 kilometres (2.2 mi) southwest of Urakhcha.	
18 May 1963	(Soviet Union) Leningrad	Tu-104B	CCCP-42483	Northern	W/O	0	Stalled on approach to Smolnoye Airport and crashed 1.5 kilometres (0.93 mi) off the airfield.	
9 June 1963	(Soviet Union) Rishtan	An-2SKh	CCCP-33116	Uzbekistan	W/O	1/2	The aircraft was spraying crops. After five flights, the crew started on the sixth flight when the spraying equipment malfunctioned. The crew was so focused on the spraying equipment that they failed to notice an oncoming tree. The aircraft struck the tree with its left wing and crashed out of control.	
14 June 1963	(Soviet Union) Pryutovo	An-2T	CCCP-15986	Privolzhsk	W/O	2/9	The aircraft was spraying crops on behalf of a sovkhoz (state farm) between Pryutovo and Aksakovo. The crew failed to get enough sleep the night before. After a few morning flights, the crew took a lunch break and drank large amounts of vodka with local farmers. The crew got back to spraying in the afternoon, but with illegal passengers on board. At 10–15 m (33–49 ft) the aircraft banked left and crashed.	
23 June 1963	(Soviet Union) Balakhta	An-2R	CCCP-09154	Krasnoyarsk	W/O	4/4	The crew was spraying crops in the region of Balakhta. The evening and night before, the crew drank some five bottles of vodka with three women and failed to get any sleep. The next morning, the crew arrived at the aircraft and completed 11 flights without incident. The crew paused to refill and the crew drank another three bottles of vodka in 40 minutes before taking off for the twelfth flight. While flying at 100 m (330 ft), the aircraft slowed down, stalled and crashed.	
13 July 1963	(Soviet Union) Irkutsk	Tu-104B	CCCP-42492	East Siberia	W/O	33/35	Crashed 3 kilometres (1.9 mi) short of the runway on final approach to Irkutsk Airport, inbound from Beijing. The aircraft was completing the first leg of an international scheduled Beijing-Irkutsk-Moscow passenger service as Flight 012 and made a premature descent. The crew was unaware of the weather conditions, and to complicate matters, water had entered into the cockpit electrical system, causing false airspeed and altitude readings.	
24 July 1963	(Soviet Union) Karaganda Airport	An-2T	CCCP-43833	Kazakhstan	W/O	1/1	A former pilot, who was drunk, entered the aircraft which was waiting on the apron for crew and passengers, took off and performed unauthorized stunts at low altitude. Three minutes after takeoff the left wing hit the apron and the aircraft slid across the apron, destroying a Lenin monument next to the terminal building and crashed upside-down and burned out.	
21 August 1963	(Soviet Union) Leningrad	Tu-124	CCCP-45021	MUTA	W/O	0/52	On takeoff from Tallinn, the nosegear failed to retract. The crew diverted to Leningrad (now Saint Petersburg) due to fog at Tallinn. The aircraft circled Leningrad to burn fuel, reducing weight for landing. While the aircraft was circling the crew attempted to force the nose gear to fully lock in the extended position with a pole from the cloak closet. On the eighth and final circuit engine number one failed, followed shortly by engine two. The crew then ditched in the Neva River. The aircraft was operating a domestic scheduled Tallinn-Moscow passenger service as Flight 366.	
23 August 1963	(Soviet Union) Nadymsky District	An-2V	CCCP-35359	Ural	W/O	0/14	Fifty-five minutes into a flight from Tazovskoye to Salekhard the engine failed at 300 m (980 ft). A forced landing on a small lake was attempted, but the aircraft could not make it that far, losing speed as it "hopped" over an obstacle and crashed in tundra 100 m (330 ft) from the lake.	
24 August 1963	(Soviet Union) Kutaisi	Avia 14P	CCCP-61617	Georgia	W/O	32/32	After takeoff from Kutaisi, the crew continued to fly under VFR despite poor visibility from heavy rain. Unbeknownst to the crew, the aircraft had deviated 13 km (8.1 mi) from the flight route. Eight minutes after takeoff, the aircraft struck the side of a mountain while flying too low. The aircraft was operating a Tbilisi-Kutaisi-Sukhumi-Krasnodar passenger service as Flight 663.	
31 August 1963	(Soviet Union) Sharya	Li-2	CCCP-65706	Moscow SPiVS	W/O	1/8	The aircraft was on an aerial photography flight to take photos of the rail line from Neya to Svesha. After 130 minutes of flight, the left engine failed due to carburetor problems. The pilot decided to divert to Sharya, but the right engine overheated. A forced landing was attempted when altitude was lost and the aircraft struck trees and crashed near the rail line.	
31 August 1963	(Soviet Union) Kapan	An-2T	CCCP-01154	Armenia	W/O	1/16	The aircraft, operating a domestic scheduled Kapan–Goris passenger service, deviated from the flight route by 5.5 km (3.4 mi). It entered a gorge near Kapan and was forced to make a climbing turn to get out, but the aircraft lost airspeed and struck treetops at 1,250 m (4,100 ft), after which it then crashed on a mountain slope and burned out.	
20 October 1963	(Soviet Union) Graham Bell Island	Il-14M	CCCP-04197	Polar	W/O	7/7	Flew into the slope of a glacier during a survey flight; the crew lost spatial orientation in the polar night.	
10 November 1963	(Soviet Union) Kuybyshev Airport	Il-18B	CCCP-75686	Uzbekistan	W/O	0/75	On approach to Kuybyshev (now Samara) the cloud base dropped to 120 m (390 ft), which was minimum for Kuybyshev Airport. Breaking through the clouds, the crew realized the aircraft was not lined up with the runway and the pilot made some sharp maneuvers to line the aircraft up. At a high rate of descent the aircraft crashed short of the runway and burned out. Due to complete the first leg of a Tashkent-Kuybyshev-Moscow passenger service.	
15 November 1963	(Soviet Union) Izobilnoye	Li-2T	CCCP-16139	Ukraine	W/O	6/6	The aircraft was operating a Yerevan-Baku-Dnipropetrovsk (now Dnipro) cargo service. After climbout to 2,100 m (6,900 ft), the crew got permission to make a stop at Rostov-on-Don before continuing to Dnipropetrovsk, but in the process, failed to request about en route weather conditions. Later on, weather worsened, which the crew did not realize. The pilot requested to descend to 1,500 m (4,900 ft), but ATC denied this and told the crew to maintain their assigned altitude. Control was lost in turbulence while flying in a thunderstorm and the aircraft partially broke up in mid-air and crashed. The left stabilizer was found 850 m (2,790 ft) from the main wreckage.	
3 December 1963	(Soviet Union) Pevek	Li-2	CCCP-16202	Magadan	W/O	0/6	During the takeoff roll, the pilot began the rotation. The aircraft lifted up a few meters but could not gain enough altitude and banked right. The crew attempted to regain control, but the aircraft was out of control. The pilot then attempted to reduce power on the left and then the right engine, but the aircraft crashed past the runway. The aircraft was overloaded, having been refueled with too much fuel. The cargo had also shifted, causing the center of gravity to be too far to the rear. Due to begin a Pevek–Nizhni Kresty–Zyrianka–Pevek cargo service.	
7 December 1963	(Soviet Union) Kirensk	An-12B	CCCP-11347	East Siberia	W/O	6/6	Lost control and crashed when both port propellers could not be feathered following fuel line problems. The aircraft was operating a Kirensk-Irkutsk cargo service as Flight 1076.	
16 December 1963	(Soviet Union) Parbig	Li-2G	CCCP-16181	West Siberia	W/O	0/4	On takeoff, the aircraft banked left and the left landing gear struck the ground three times over 190 m (620 ft). After passing the end of the runway, the aircraft rolled for 36 m (118 ft) in deep snow, after which it climbed steeply to 280 m (920 ft) before finally crashing onto buildings 470 m (1,540 ft) further.	
3 January 1964	(Soviet Union) Batagay	An-2T	CCCP-23740	Yakut	W/O	2/2	Crashed short of the runway during a night time training flight.	
25 January 1964	(Soviet Union) Kenkiyak	An-2T	CCCP-13651	Kazakhstan	W/O	3/9	Struck a hill in poor weather following a premature descent. The aircraft was operating a domestic scheduled Baiganin–Kenkiyak–Aktyubinsk passenger service.	
29 January 1964	(Soviet Union) Nukha	Li-2	CCCP-54818	Azerbaijan	W/O	1/22	After a 124 m (407 ft) takeoff roll, the tail wheel lifted up, but the left landing gear struck a bump on the runway. Instead of abandoning takeoff, the pilot continued and began takeoff quickly. He pulled back on the control column to rotate, but the aircraft's speed was too low and although the aircraft took off, it stalled and bounced several times before running down a ravine. Due to operate the final leg of a Byelokany–Zaqatala–Nukha (now Shaki)–Baku passenger service as Flight A-4.	
9 February 1964	(Soviet Union) Dhzigda Airport	An-2T	CCCP-55541	Far East	W/O	3/3	The pilot became disorientated on takeoff, allowing the aircraft to lose altitude. The aircraft struck trees and crashed in a forest near the Maya River. The aircraft was on a positioning flight from Dhzigda to Nelkan.	
13 May 1964	(Soviet Union) Svetilnoye	An-2R	CCCP-09259	Ukraine	W/O	1/3	After completing a crop-spraying flight the aircraft came in too high for landing. The aircraft landed hard 9 m (30 ft) short of the runway, nosing over and catching fire.	
8 June 1964	(Soviet Union) Cheremshan	An-2SKh	CCCP-25467	Privolzhsk	W/O	2/5	While on a positioning flight from Cheremshan to Kazan following crop-spraying, the crew, who were drunk, performed stunts at low altitude. The aircraft crashed 160 m (520 ft) outside the airfield.	
9 June 1964	(Soviet Union) Novosibirsk	Tu-104B	CCCP-42476	West Siberia	W/O	0	Weather at Novosibirsk was poor due to a thunderstorm near the airport. Despite this, the crew continued the approach and lost sight of the runway after flying into heavy rain. When the aircraft touched down, one of the pilots performed an overshoot and another activated the braking parachute. The throttles were closed and the aircraft touched down hard on the left main landing gear, breaking off the left wing. A fire erupted, but all on board survived. The aircraft was completing a Moscow-Chelyabinsk-Novosibirsk passenger service as Flight 35.	
2 July 1964	(Soviet Union) Krasnodar	Il-18B	CCCP-75661	MUTA	W/O	Unknown	Landed wheels-up after flying through a hailstorm.	
3 July 1964	(Soviet Union) Urtazym	An-2R	CCCP-09242	Privolzhsk	W/O	1/2	Crashed while crop-spraying. The pilots became distracted while listening to a weather forecast on the radio and writing it down. The aircraft gradually lost altitude until it struck a hill.	
3 August 1964	(Soviet Union) Magadan Airport	Il-18V	CCCP-75824	Far East	W/O	0	While on approach to Magadan from Khabarovsk, the aircraft began descending prematurely. The instructor-pilot took control to level out after he realized that the descent speed was increasing, but the aircraft was too low and it struck a concrete embankment at the start of the runway, collapsing the main landing gear. The aircraft touched down on the nosegear and the rear of the fuselage contacted the runway. The aircraft had been notorious for premature descents as well as requiring more engine power on approach.	
14 August 1964	(Soviet Union) Elista	An-2R	CCCP-62730	North Caucasus	W/O	3/3	During a training flight at Elista Airport, the engine caught fire. The pilot decided to return for an emergency landing but on final approach, fuel vapors exploded, and the aircraft crashed. Poor maintenance was blamed.	
2 September 1964	(Soviet Union) Yuzhno-Sakhalinsk	Il-18V	CCCP-75531	Krasnoyarsk	W/O	87/93	Crashed into a hillside at 2,000 feet (610 m) while on approach to Yuzhno-Sakhalinsk Airport, inbound from Khabarovsk as Flight 721, following a premature descent.	
13 October 1964	(Soviet Union) Cape Khorgoy	Li-2T	CCCP-04370	Polar	W/O	0/5	Struck a hill near the Anabar River, Tiksi Region in poor visibility. The aircraft struck a second hill after flying for 650 m (2,130 ft), bounced off of it and crashed after 60 m (200 ft), breaking off an engine.	
24 October 1964	(Soviet Union) Nikolayevsk-na-Amure	An-2T	CCCP-01231	Far East	W/O	2/2	Shortly after takeoff the crew encountered poor weather, which was not forecast. The crew decided to return but became disorientated and the aircraft struck a hillside at 190 m (620 ft). The aircraft was operating a Nikolayevsk-na-Amure–Okha cargo service (mail).	
9 November 1964	(Soviet Union) Găvănoasa	An-2SKh	CCCP-43915	Moldova	W/O	4/4	During a positioning flight following crop spraying at the "Gigant" kolkhoz (collective farm), the drunk crew performed stunts. The aircraft lost airspeed, entered a dive and crashed.	
18 November 1964	(Soviet Union) Murmansk Airport	An-2V	CCCP-09275	Northern	W/O	1/2	En route to Umba the aircraft deviated 3 km (1.9 mi) to the right of the flight route in poor visibility. The aircraft struck a snow-covered hill 3 m (9.8 ft) from the top some 20 km (12 mi) from Murmansk.	
28 November 1964	(Soviet Union) Surami	Il-14P	CCCP-41883	Georgia	W/O	7/15	The aircraft was operating a domestic scheduled Tbilisi–Kutaisi–Krasnodar passenger service as Flight F-51. While en route it first leg, it crashed at 980 metres (3,220 ft) into a mountain, near Surami, after the actual airspeed was incorrectly reported to the crew and a descent was initiated still over mountainous terrain, amid a cloudy environment.	
2 January 1965	(Soviet Union) Darvaza Airport	Li-2T	CCCP-63842	Turkmenistan	W/O	24/24	While on the second leg of a domestic scheduled Tashauz–Darvaza–Ashgabat passenger service as Flight 112, both engines failed on takeoff from Darvaza due to fuel starvation after the pilot selected a near-empty fuel tank. The aircraft lost altitude and crashed in the desert 4 km (2.5 mi) from the airport and 600 m (2,000 ft) to the right of the runway and caught fire. This accident remains the deadliest in Turkmenistan.	
4 January 1965	(Soviet Union) Alma-Ata	Il-18B	CCCP-75685	Kazakhstan	W/O	64/103	While on approach to Alma-Ata the crew were unaware that the weather was poor. The aircraft deviated to the right after passing the locator middle marker. Air traffic control instructed the pilot to perform a go-around, but the pilot continued the approach. The aircraft crashed 75 m (246 ft) short of the runway, crossed a ditch, and struck trees. The aircraft was operating a domestic scheduled Moscow-Omsk/Semipalatinsk-Alma Ata passenger service as Flight 101/X-20.	
2 February 1965	(Soviet Union) Varkhi	An-2R	CCCP-45218	Belarus	W/O	1/3	The aircraft was operating a crop-spraying flight for the "Mayakovskogo" kolkhoz (collective farm). The crew, who were drunk, left Gorodok and approaching Varkhi, made a sharp right turn at low altitude when the right wing stuck telephone lines and the aircraft crashed.	
7 March 1965	(Soviet Union) Aradan	Li-2	CCCP-54971	Krasnoyarsk	W/O	31/31	Lost control following a failure of the left wing in severe turbulence. The aircraft was operating an Abakan–Kyzyl passenger service as Flight 542. The crash is the deadliest known accident involving the Li-2. Following a 1966 crash of an Li-2 in the same circumstances, it was revealed that the wing failed due to a design defect.	
8 March 1965	(Soviet Union) Kuybyshev	Tu-124V	CCCP-45028	Privolzhsk	W/O	30/39	Crashed shortly after takeoff from Kuybyshev Airport after the pilots lost control of the aircraft during climb out, likely caused by problems with the altitude indicators. Due to operate a domestic scheduled Kuybyshev–Rostov–Sochi passenger service as Flight 513.	
8 March 1965	(Soviet Union) Frunze	Il-18B	CCCP-75690	Kyrgyzstan	Repaired	0	Damaged in a wheels-up landing at Frunze Airport. The crew forgot to lower the landing gear after several landing attempts.	
20 March 1965	(Soviet Union) Khanty-Mansiysk	An-24	CCCP-46764	Ural	W/O	43/47	Undershot the runway on landing at Khanty-Mansiysk Airport inbound from Tyumen, breaking up after hitting a snowdrift, and catching fire.	
21 July 1965	(Soviet Union) Gorny	An-2T	CCCP-01201	Far East	W/O	1/12	While flying the Briakan–Komsomolsk-na-Amure leg of a Poliny Osipenko–Khabarovsk passenger service, the aircraft encountered poor weather. The crew deviated 17 km (11 mi) to the right of the flight route, entering clouds. The aircraft contacted tree tops on a mountain slope at about 600 m (2,000 ft) and crashed.	
25 August 1965	(Soviet Union) Šilale	An-2R	CCCP-05856	Lithuania	W/O	1/1	The co-pilot, who was drunk, took off at dusk. The aircraft struck a tree top 7 km (4.3 mi) from the airstrip, crashed and burned out.	
5 September 1965	(Soviet Union) Loukhi	An-2V	CCCP-98320	Northern	W/O	1/2	During a positioning flight from a lake to Loukhi, the pilot, who was drunk, began a steep descent over Lake Keret. The co-pilot attempted to recover, but the aircraft crashed in the lake, nosed over, and sank in 4 m (13 ft) of water. The co-pilot was rescued by a boat; the pilot did not survive.	
11 September 1965	(Soviet Union) Ulan-Ude	An-12	CCCP-11337	Polar	W/O	8/8	The aircraft was operating a Tashkent-Fergana-Novosibirsk-Krasnoyarsk-Irkutsk-Yuzhno Sakhalinsk cargo service. The crew diverted to Ulan-Ude after the airport at Irkutsk was closed due to poor weather. The crew did not set the altimeter correctly, causing false readings. The aircraft crashed into a wooded mountain side at 1,200 m (3,900 ft).	
11 November 1965	(Soviet Union) Murmansk	Tu-124V	CCCP-45086	Northern	W/O	32/64	The aircraft was completing a domestic scheduled Moscow–Murmansk passenger service as Flight 99 when it crashed 2.6 kilometres (1.6 mi) off Murmansk Airport, on approach. The pilot mistook lights near the Middle Marker Beacon for runway lights and began descending, but by the time the pilots noticed the mistake, it was too late. The aircraft crashed on a frozen lake.	
16 November 1965	(Soviet Union) Ust-Maya (Note: Dubious location)	An-2SKh	CCCP-01189	Yakut	W/O	Unknown	Main undercarriage broke off upon landing in snow.	
23 December 1965	(Soviet Union) Magadan	Il-18B	CCCP-75688	MUTA	W/O	0	The airframe sustained irreparable damages when it dived from 8,000 metres (26,000 ft).	
31 December 1965	Unknown	Unknown	Unknown	Unknown	Unknown	1	Hijacking episode.	
1 January 1966	(Soviet Union) Petropavlovsk-Kamchatsky	Il-14P	CCCP-61618	Magadan	W/O	23/23	While flying at 3,300 m (10,800 ft), the right engine failed. The crew considered diverting to Sobolevo but the runway was covered in snow and decided to continue. The aircraft started to gradually lose altitude and was at 2,900 m (9,500 ft) after passing Sobolevo. The co-pilot suggested a wheels-up landing at Ust-Bolsheretsk, but the pilot again decided to continue. The aircraft cleared high terrain but flew into poor weather. The aircraft lost altitude until it struck a mountain at 2,049 m (6,722 ft). The aircraft was operating a domestic scheduled Magadan-Petropavlovsk Kamchatsky passenger service.	
14 January 1966	(Soviet Union) Shamurat	An-2T	CCCP-02185	Uzbekistan	W/O	11/11	En route to Samarkand from the "Kommunizm" state farm the aircraft encountered poor weather with low clouds and heavy rain. The captain decided to continue the flight, and deviated east from the flight route for better weather. While flying over the Karatau mountain range, the aircraft lost altitude due to strong winds and struck a mountainside at 930 m (3,050 ft). The aircraft was operating a domestic scheduled Nurata–Samarkand passenger service as Flight 330.	
30 January 1966	(Soviet Union) Velyka Vyska	An-2R	CCCP-02851	Kirovograd Flight School	W/O	1/6	During a training flight out of Lelekovka in poor visibility the trainee pilot left zone no. 2 by mistake and began losing height. When he saw a triangulation tower he began a steep right turn. The instructor intervened, but too late, and the aircraft struck the ground near a rail line and crashed.	
16 February 1966	(Soviet Union) Pechora	Il-14M	CCCP-52058	Komi	W/O	35/35	Experienced a fire in one of the engines while en route a domestic scheduled Vorkuta–Syktyvkar passenger service as Flight 302. The crew attempted to divert the aircraft to Pechora after the fire could not be extinguished, but the burning engine detached from the wing, causing the aircraft to bank left, crashing moments later into a forest, 70 kilometres (43 mi) north of the city.	
17 February 1966	(Soviet Union) Moscow	Tu-114	CCCP-76491	International	W/O	21/48	Struck a snowdrift with the port main landing gear upon takeoff from Sheremetyevo Airport. The pilot maneuvered the aircraft so as to bank it to the right, causing the inner starboard propeller to hit the ground. The airplane, due to inaugurate the Moscow–Conakry–Accra–Brazzaville service as Flight 065, crashed and caught fire. This was the only fatal accident involving a Tu-114.	
21 February 1966	(Soviet Union) Baranikha	An-2	CCCP-79943	Magadan	W/O	0/2	The aircraft was on a special flight from Pevek to Baranikha in good weather. While approaching Baranikha, weather worsened and visibility dropped due to snow. The aircraft descended to 330 m (1,080 ft), but it struck a snow-covered hill, tearing off the left ski. after which it continued before nosing down and crashing in the snow. The pilot probably reduced engine power too much during the approach.	
26 February 1966	(Soviet Union) Mys Nalycheva	An-2T	CCCP-79910	Far East	W/O	3/3	The aircraft encountered poor weather, with poor visibility and heavy snow. The crew deviated to the left of the flight route by 17 km (11 mi); the aircraft then crashed at 589 m (1,932 ft) on the snow-covered summit of a hill on Mys Nalycheva.	
2 March 1966	(Soviet Union) Golubichnoye	An-2T	CCCP-79860	Far East	W/O	2/2	Crashed during a training flight. The cause of the crash was not determined, but an in-flight fire or spatial disorientation were theorized.	
25 March 1966	(Soviet Union) Ramenskoye	Li-2	CCCP-65710	Moscow SPiMVL	W/O	9/9	While at 2,100 m (6,900 ft) during a training flight, the aircraft encountered turbulence and crashed out of control. The left outer wing had separated in turbulence due to a design defect.	
23 April 1966	(Soviet Union) Off Baku	Il-14P	CCCP-61772	Azerbaijan	W/O	33/33	Twelve minutes after takeoff, the pilots reported that they were having engine problems and thought wet spark plugs were the cause. The crew turned around to return to Baku, but during the approach power was lost in the left engine. The pilots later reported that the temperature in both engines was dropping. Three minutes later the crew radioed that they were flying at 200 m (660 ft). The crew could not locate the airport due to poor visibility and flew back out over the Caspian Sea. The crew then sent an SOS signal and reported they were ditching the aircraft in the sea. On 13 May 1966, Navy divers searching for a sunken object accidentally found the wreckage 18–20 km (11–12 mi) south of Nargin Island in 23 m (75 ft) of water; the cause of the engine problems was never determined. Due to operate a domestic scheduled Baku–Makhachkala–Saratov passenger service as Flight 2723.	
23 April 1966	(Soviet Union) Labinsk	An-2R	CCCP-02807	North Caucasus	W/O	3/3	During a crop-spraying flight, the aircraft lost altitude while turning at low altitude. The aircraft crashed in a 50-60-degree bank.	
13 June 1966	(Soviet Union) Minsk	Tu-124	CCCP-45017	Belarus	W/O	0	Overran wet runway on landing at Minsk-1 International Airport.	
24 June 1966	(Soviet Union) Arteni	An-2SKh	CCCP-01127	Armenia	W/O	1/3	Struck a high-voltage power line and crashed during a crop-spraying flight.	
27 July 1966	(Soviet Union) Zaporizhia Oblast	Tu-124V	CCCP-45038	Privolzhsk	Repaired	1/90	During the Kharkov–Simferopol leg of a Kazan–Kharkov–Simferopol passenger service as Flight 67, the aircraft unexpectedly entered storm clouds at 7,200 m (23,600 ft), after which it rolled 60-70° and entered a high-speed dive for 10 seconds. The crew were able to recover at 2,800 m (9,200 ft) and the aircraft landed safely at Simferopol. One passenger died and several crew and other passengers suffered various injuries during the incident.	
27 August 1966	(Soviet Union) Arkhangelsk	Il-18V	CCCP-75552	Latvia	W/O	0/121	Overran the runway on takeoff with a locked rudder at Arkhangelsk Airport. The aircraft was due to operate a domestic scheduled Arkhangelsk-Leningrad passenger service as Flight 3772.	
7 September 1966	(Soviet Union) Semipalatinsk	An-2T	CCCP-79816	Tajikistan	W/O	6/6	The aircraft was on a Dushanbe–Murghab flight in support of a geological expedition. While flying through the Murghab River gorge the aircraft caught fire, probably due to an acetone spill in the cabin. The pilot attempted to force-land in the area where the Murghab and Zapadny Pshart rivers meet, but while performing a left turn the aircraft struck the slope of the gorge and crashed.	
9 September 1966	(Soviet Union) Off Tsikhisdziri Cape	An-2TP	CCCP-96224	Georgia	W/O	1/12	Ditched in the Black Sea following engine failure. Ten minutes after takeoff, at 250 m (820 ft), the engine failed due to magneto problems. The crew ditched the aircraft near a fishing boat; the aircraft was recovered five days later from a depth of 34–36 m (112–118 ft). The aircraft was operating a domestic scheduled Batumi–Poti–Sukhumi passenger service as Flight G-72.	
22 November 1966	(Soviet Union) Alma-Ata	Il-18B	CCCP-75665	Kazakhstan	W/O	3/68	The aircraft was due to operate a domestic scheduled Alma Ata (now Almaty)-Semipalatinsk-Moscow passenger service as Flight X-19. During the takeoff roll at Alma-Ata Airport the number three engine failed, probably due to wet snow ingestion. The takeoff was continued but the aircraft veered off the runway to the right. The aircraft then got briefly airborne at a high angle of attack until the tail struck a 70 cm (28 in) mound. The aircraft then struck a shore of a river and came to a rest on a hillside.	
18 December 1966	(Soviet Union) Zafarabad	An-2R	CCCP-46601	Tajikistan	W/O	2/2	The pilot, who was drunk, took a mechanic on a ride, during which the pilot performed stunts at low altitude. The aircraft stalled, crashed and caught fire.	
14 January 1967	(Soviet Union) Novosibirsk	An-12	CCCP-04343	Polar	W/O	6/6	Crashed and exploded during an emergency landing following a fire in the cargo hold that broke out shortly after takeoff from Tolmachevo Airport. The aircraft was operating a Moscow-Novosibirsk-Krasnoyarsk-Khabarovsk cargo service as Flight 5003.	
6 March 1967	(Soviet Union) Salekhard	An-12B	CCCP-11007	Polar	W/O	5/6	The crew did not make a proper selection of the flaps before takeoff from Salekhard Airport; the aircraft stalled following rotation, crashing into the banks of the Ob River, 1.8 kilometres (1.1 mi) off the airport. Due to operate a Salekhard–Tarko-Sale cargo service.	
12 March 1967	(Soviet Union) Off Yakutsk	Il-14P	CCCP-61657	Yakut	W/O	15/19	One of the engines caught fire while en route an Olyokminsk–Yakutsk service as Flight 1799. The aircraft crashed after it hit trees 86 kilometres (53 mi) away from Yakutsk when the crew attempted to force-land the aircraft amid snowy weather in darkness.	
13 March 1967	(Soviet Union) Black Sea	An-2P	CCCP-04959	North Caucasus	W/O	1/1	The aircraft was hijacked and stolen at Tuapse by a former Soviet Air Force and Aeroflot pilot who wished to escape to Turkey. While flying over the Black Sea the aircraft was intercepted by a Yak-28P and later shot down by a MiG-17.	
6 April 1967	(Soviet Union) Moscow	Il-18V	CCCP-75563	Soviet Gov't/Aeroflot	W/O	8/8	The aircraft arrived at Domodedovo Airport from Krasnoyarsk. The aircraft was then to be ferried to Vnukovo Airport, but after performing a turn after takeoff, the aircraft spiraled down and crashed 2 km (1.2 mi) to the right of the runway.	
11 April 1967	(Soviet Union) Nizhniye Kresty	Li-2T	CCCP-04213	Polar	W/O	0/5	While on approach to Nizhniye Kresty Airport, the pilot mistook empty barrels, marking the start of the snow airstrip, for parked helicopters. The pilot performed an emergency turn out, but this caused the aircraft to stall and crash on the frozen Kolyma River 3.5 km (2.2 mi) from the airstrip. The aircraft was completing an Egvekinot–Nizhniye Kresty service.	
11 May 1967	(Soviet Union) Alexeyevka	An-2SKh	CCCP-05604	Kazakhstan	W/O	12/12	En route to Alexeyevka the aircraft encountered poor weather with low clouds and rain. Entering clouds, the aircraft deviated 6 km (3.7 mi) from the flight route. The aircraft struck the side of Mount Aina-Sulak at 970 m (3,180 ft).	
4 June 1967	(Soviet Union) Blagoveshchensk	An-12TP-2	CCCP-04366	Polar	W/O	0	Undercarriage collapsed on landing at Blagoveshchensk Airport.	
11 June 1967	(Soviet Union) Gazimurski Zavod	An-2R	CCCP-49345	East Siberia	W/O	2/3	Lost altitude while turning and crashed while crop-spraying.	
17 June 1967	(Soviet Union) Karaganda Airport	Li-2	CCCP-71220	Kazakhstan	W/O	9/34	After touching down at Karaganda, the aircraft lifted off again due to elevator control problems. The aircraft climbed to 10–15 m (33–49 ft) at which the pilot then decided to perform a go-around. The aircraft stalled at 20–25 m (66–82 ft), crashed back on the runway and caught fire. The aircraft was completing a domestic scheduled Tselinograd (now Astana)–Karaganda passenger service as Flight 447.	
4 July 1967	(Soviet Union) Verkhnyaya Dobrinka	An-2T	CCCP-98241	Ukraine	W/O	3/3	During a crop-spraying flight for the "Dobrynski" sovkhoz, the crew, who was drunk, flew too low and nearly struck a telephone line. While attempting to 'hop' over the line, the aircraft stalled and crashed in a field and burned out.	
28 July 1967	(Soviet Union) Udskoye	An-2R	CCCP-09243	Far East	W/O	1/3	The aircraft was operating the second leg of a Kurun-Uryakh–Nelkan–Udskoye in support of an expedition. On approach to Udskoye the crew encountered poor weather (low clouds and fog). The crew failed to return and deviated from the flight route to the left by 14 km (8.7 mi). The aircraft struck the side of a wooded hill.	
9 August 1967	(Soviet Union) Aravan	An-2R	CCCP-55799	Kyrgyzstan	W/O	2/2	While spraying crops at the "im. Zhdanova" kolkhoz, the crew mishandled the fuel system and the engine quit. Instead of attempting a forced landing, the crew decided to restart the engine. Altitude was lost and the aircraft struck trees next to a house, ripped off the house's roof and crashed.	
13 August 1967	(Soviet Union) Ayanka	An-2T	CCCP-15959	Far East	W/O	2/3	The crew and a friend of the crew left Ayanka for a fishing party by the Penzhina River (8 km (5.0 mi) north of Ayanka). En route while flying too low, the aircraft struck trees, stalled and crashed on a sandbank. The crew had no permission for the flight.	
29 August 1967	(Soviet Union) Meschura Airport	An-2	CCCP-42615	Komi	W/O	6/13	On initial climb the engine control lever disconnected due to a missing lock tab. The aircraft lost altitude and airspeed and crash landed on trees and caught fire. The aircraft was operating a domestic scheduled Meschura–Knyazhpogost passenger service as Flight 96.	
12 October 1967	(Soviet Union) Aldan Airport	Li-2	CCCP-16150	Yakut	W/O	5/5	The aircraft was operating a Takhtamygda–Kyzyl-Syr cargo service. The crew diverted to Aldan after the left engine failed. While on approach to Aldan the landing gear did not lower and the crew aborted the approach. A steep left turn was performed to avoid hitting a mountain past the runway, but the aircraft stalled over the left wing and crashed from a height of 15–20 metres (49–66 ft).	
20 October 1967	(Soviet Union) Vetluga	An-2TP	CCCP-29320	Privolzhsk	W/O	14/20	Stalled and crashed on takeoff from Vetluga Airport. The aircraft was overloaded and the center of gravity was too far to the rear. Due to begin the second leg of a Gorki–Vetluga–Kalinina–Sharya passenger service.	
16 November 1967	(Soviet Union) Sverdlovsk	Il-18V	CCCP-75538	Ural	W/O	107/107 (Note: Figures for the death toll of this accident are discrepant, as the number of fatalities was reported to be 107, or 130.)	One of the engines caught fire upon takeoff from Koltsovo Airport. The propeller could not be feathered, causing the aircraft to crash upside down. Due to operate a domestic scheduled Sverdlovsk–Tashkent passenger service as Flight 2230.	
19 November 1967	(Soviet Union) Krasnoyarsk	Li-2T	CCCP-04227	Krasnoyarsk	W/O	4/4	The aircraft was returning to Krasnoyarsk following a cargo flight to Yeniseysk. In low visibility, the crew did not realize that they were flying too low. Some 55 m (180 ft) before the middle marker, the aircraft struck a telephone pole, a wooden fence and a hangar before finally crashing 85 m (279 ft) past the middle marker. The crew probably began descending too soon.	
26 November 1967	(Soviet Union) Dubovka	An-2R	CCCP-09210	Azerbaijan	W/O	2/3	The aircraft was being ferried from Baku to Kharkov (now Kharkiv) for overhaul. During the Kizlyar–Stavropol leg, the crew encountered poor weather (low clouds and snow). Instead of returning, the pilot decided to continue. The aircraft struck the side of a mountain northwest of Dubrovka.	
1 December 1967	(Soviet Union) Mugur-Aksy	An-2R	CCCP-96215	Krasnoyarsk	W/O	6/14	During the second leg of a Kyzyl–Teeli–Mugur-Aksy passenger service, the crew flew into clouds while on approach to Mugur-Aksy and deviated from the flight route. The crew decided to go around, but too late; the aircraft struck the side of a snow-covered mountain some 7 km (4.3 mi) west of the airport.	
30 December 1967	(Soviet Union) Liepaya	An-24B	CCCP-46215	Latvia	W/O	43/51	Inbound from Riga, the aircraft was too high above the glide slope. The crew added takeoff power and started a missed approach. At that time, the left engine was in reverse thrust mode. The aircraft lost altitude, rolled to the left and crashed in a snow-covered field. The aircraft was operating a Riga-Liepaya passenger service as Flight L-51.	
31 December 1967	(Soviet Union) Voronezh	An-24B	CCCP-46201	Moscow SPiMVL	W/O	0	Crashed short of the runway on approach to Voronezh Airport.	
4 January 1968	(Soviet Union) Vologda	An-2TP	CCCP-96226	Northern	W/O	16	Mid-air collision. CCCP-09667 was operating a Ust-Kubinsk-Vologda passenger service while CCCP-96266 was departing Vologda on a cargo flight to Saint Petersburg. In limited visibility in snow, both aircraft collided at 200 m (660 ft) and crashed 23 km (14 mi) north of Vologda.	
4 January 1968	(Soviet Union) Vologda	An-2TP	CCCP-09667	Northern	W/O	16	Mid-air collision. CCCP-09667 was operating a Ust-Kubinsk-Vologda passenger service while CCCP-96266 was departing Vologda on a cargo flight to Saint Petersburg. In limited visibility in snow, both aircraft collided at 200 m (660 ft) and crashed 23 km (14 mi) north of Vologda.	
6 January 1968	(Soviet Union) Olyokminsk	An-24B	CCCP-47733	Yakut	W/O	45/45	Broke up at 4,500 metres (14,800 ft) and crashed 92 kilometres (57 mi) west of Olyokminsk. The aircraft was operating the second leg of a scheduled domestic Yakutsk–Olyokminsk–Lensk–Ust-Kut–Krasnoyarsk–Novosibirsk passenger service as Flight 1668. The cause was never determined, but damage to the tail or a control system failure were theorized.	
9 January 1968	(Soviet Union) Karaganda	Il-18V	CCCP-75519	Northern	W/O	0	Landed short of the runway at Karaganda Airport.	
29 January 1968	(Soviet Union) Yakutsk	An-12B	CCCP-11015	Yakut	W/O	0	Hard landing at Yakutsk Airport.	
12 February 1968	(Soviet Union) Ayaguz	An-2R	CCCP-28946	Kazakhstan	W/O	0/6	En route to Ayaguz the aircraft encountered snow. The aircraft then crashed into the side of Mount Tikasu at 1,850 m (6,070 ft) and caught fire. The pilot left the crash site the next day and hiked 18 hours through deep snow to Nekrasovka. The other five survivors were rescued by an Mi-4 helicopter.	
19 February 1968	(Iraq) Baghdad	Unknown	Unknown	Unknown	W/O	2/2	Hit a building on landing.	
24 February 1968	(Soviet Union) Donetsk Airport	Il-18V	CCCP-75560	Ural	W/O	0	The crew aborted takeoff for unknown reasons. Unable to stop within the remaining runway distance, the aircraft overran, breaking off the landing gear.	
29 February 1968	(Soviet Union) Off Bratsk	Il-18D	CCCP-74252	Far East	W/O	83/84	Broke up in-flight during an emergency descent, crashing and bursting into flames 160 kilometres (99 mi) away from Bratsk, possibly due to a fuel leak. The aircraft was en route a domestic scheduled Krasnoyarsk–Petropavlovsk-Kamchatsky passenger service as Flight 15. One passenger, whose seat was attached to a large portion of the fuselage, survived the accident.	
7 March 1968	(Soviet Union) Volgograd Airport	Tu-124	CCCP-45019	North Caucasus	W/O	1/49	During the takeoff roll, the pilot attempted to rotate and pulled back on the control column. At the same time, he accidentally pushed the spoiler switch for three seconds. The aircraft climbed to 10–15 m (33–49 ft) and flew for 400 m (1,300 ft), but then it banked left and crashed, breaking off the left wing and breaking the fuselage in three. Due to begin a Volgograd-Rostov on Don-Odessa passenger service as Flight 3153. The spoiler switch had been placed in the wrong spot on the steering column.	
9 March 1968	(Soviet Union) Mount Getantag	Il-14G	CCCP-41840	Georgia	W/O	5/5	The aircraft was flying a Tbilisi–Yerevan cargo service when the crew decided to fly back to Tbilisi as they had lost visual because of the weather. The aircraft crashed into Mount Getantag at 2,500 metres (8,200 ft).	
22 April 1968	(Soviet Union) Moscow	Il-18V	CCCP-75526	MUTA	W/O	5/5	Hit power lines while on a training flight and crashed near Domodedovo Airport.	
16 May 1968	(Soviet Union) Maryinka	An-2M	CCCP-05977	Moscow SPiMVL	W/O	1/1	The aircraft was due to begin crop-spraying for the "Pobeda" sovkhoz. Immediately after takeoff the pilot probably lost control of the flaps and ailerons. The pilot dropped the load (the aircraft was due to perform crop-spraying) and regained control of the aircraft, but some 8 km (5.0 mi) later the aircraft banked left, inverted, and crashed in a field at the "Polibino" sovkhoz (state farm) and burned out. The cause of the loss of control was never determined.	
19 May 1968	(Soviet Union) Tenginskaya	An-2R	CCCP-45228	North Caucasus	W/O	2/2	While crop-spraying for the "Pobeda" sovkhoz, the aircraft lost altitude while turning. The aircraft crashed and burned out. The pilot had performed the turn too sharp, too low, and too slow.	
28 May 1968	(Soviet Union) Slobodovka	An-2R	CCCP-45209	Ukraine	W/O	2/2	Crashed while crop-spraying.	
30 May 1968	(Soviet Union) Semikarakorsk district	An-2M	CCCP-05989	North Caucasus	W/O	1/2	The pilot was performing crop-spraying flight for the "Novo-Zolotovski" state farm with a local guide on board. Distracted by the passenger, the pilot allowed the aircraft to lost altitude. The aircraft struck the ground and burned out.	
1 July 1968	(Soviet Union) Breusovka	An-2M	CCCP-02332	Ukraine	W/O	2/3	The aircraft was spraying crops near Olkhovatka, Poltava Region. During one of these flights, the pilot allowed two passengers on board. After completing the flight the pilot flew to Kozelshchyna, taking on passengers as he went. At Kozelshchyna the pilot and passengers drank vodka. The pilot then flew back with two mechanics and performed more crop-spraying. After this second flight the pilot drank again. The pilot and mechanics got back on the aircraft and took off. After performing a right turn at 25–30 m (82–98 ft) the engine failed due to contaminated fuel. The pilot force-landed in a wheat field, collapsing the landing gear. The aircraft continued to slide on its belly, breaking up as it went along. The fuselage collapsed and wings separated.	
21 July 1968	(Soviet Union) Sufi-Kurgan	An-2R	CCCP-32209	Kyrgyzstan	W/O	14/14	Crashed on a mountain slope. The pilots became disorientated in bad weather and deviated west of the flight route by 10 km (6.2 mi). The aircraft was operating a Dzhargital–Lyahsh–Daraut-Kurgan–Osh passenger service.	
3 August 1968	(Soviet Union) Psebai	An-2SKh	CCCP-01118	North Caucasus	W/O	14/14	En route to Psebai, the aircraft encountered poor weather with rain and poor visibility. The crew decided to return but the aircraft struck a wooded mountain side in the Skalisty Range at 1,050 m (3,440 ft). The aircraft was operating a domestic scheduled Krasnodar–Psebai passenger service as Flight 961.	
8 August 1968	(Soviet Union) Mirny	An-10A	CCCP-11172	East Siberia	W/O	0	Hit a vehicle after running off the runway of Mirny Airport following the failure of the main starboard undercarriage.	
22 September 1968	(Soviet Union) Seymchan	An-2TP	CCCP-91763	Yakut	W/O	5/8	During a flight in support of a geologic expedition the aircraft encountered poor weather over the mountains with low clouds. The aircraft drifted off course by 25 km (16 mi) and began descending in cloud over mountains until it struck the side of Mount Khapchagai some 61 km (38 mi) northwest of Seymchan.	
6 October 1968	(Soviet Union) Mary	An-24B	CCCP-46552	Turkmenistan	W/O	0	Forced landing due to engine failure while flying at 4,200 m (13,800 ft).	
20 October 1968	(Soviet Union) Krasnoyarsk	Il-18D	CCCP-75436	West Siberia	W/O	0	During the first leg of a Novosibirsk–Yakutsk–Magadan passenger service, hydraulic pressure on engine two dropped for reasons unknown. The pilot decided to divert to Krasnoyarsk, where weather was poor. The approach was made in snow and during finals, the aircraft was too low and struck the ground short of the runway. The pilot also should have diverted to Kemerovo or Bratsk where weather was good.	
2 November 1968	(Soviet Union) Lensk	An-12B	CCCP-11349	East Siberia	W/O	6/6	Controlled flight into terrain on approach to Lensk Airport, 15.6 kilometres (9.7 mi) off Lensk.	
December 1968	Antarctica	Li-2T	CCCP-04214	Polar	W/O	0	Damaged on landing; subsequently destroyed by strong winds.	
10 January 1969	(Soviet Union) Malka	An-2T	CCCP-70940	Far East	W/O	2/13	Struck a mountain. The crew set course over mountains instead of along the valleys, despite poor weather. The aircraft entered clouds and struck a mountain slope at 1,230 m (4,040 ft) in the Ganalskiye gory range, slid for 700 metres (2,300 ft) down the slope, ending up in the valley of the Zubastaya River.	
3 March 1969	(Soviet Union) Rubashovka	An-2M	CCCP-06214	Moscow SPiMVL	W/O	2/2	During a crop-spraying flight from Rubashovka to the "Krasnoye Znamya" sovkhoz (state farm) the pilot, who was drunk, performed stunts with an unauthorized passenger on board. The pilot was recovering from a loop at low-altitude when the aircraft crashed 140 m (460 ft) from the Rubashovka airstrip and caught fire.	
24 March 1969	(Soviet Union) Alma-Ata	An-24	CCCP-46751	Kazakhstan	W/O	4/31	Crashed shortly after takeoff from Alma-Ata Airport. The right engine had lost power after the landing gear was retracted, causing a loss of speed and height, hitting trees and crashing into the ground. The airframe broke in two, and both pieces caught fire. Due to operate a domestic scheduled Alma-Ata–Karaganda passenger service as Flight 2305.	
28 March 1969	(Soviet Union) Sagirdasht	An-6	CCCP-98316	Tajikistan	W/O	11/13	En route to Tavildara the aircraft encountered poor weather over mountainous terrain with cloud-covered summits. The aircraft deviated 8 km (5.0 mi) to the left of the flight route, striking the side of a mountain in the Darwaz Range. The wreckage was found on 31 March and survivors rescued two days later. The aircraft was operating a domestic scheduled Kalaikhum–Tavildara–Dushanbe passenger service as Flight W-84.	
30 March 1969	(Soviet Union) Sergeyevka	An-2R	CCCP-29320	Ukraine	W/O	4/4	The aircraft was on a positioning flight from Priluki to Sergeyevka for crop-spraying when it crashed near Sergeyevka airstrip after the crew became disorientated in poor weather.	
7 April 1969	(Soviet Union) Shcherbinovsky District	An-2R	CCCP-13667	Northern	W/O	3/3	While operating a crop-spraying flight for the "Severny" state farm, the pilot, who was drunk, allowed two passengers on board. While attempting a steep turn at low altitude the aircraft lost control and crashed.	
18 April 1969	(Soviet Union) Otar	An-2R	CCCP-09193	Kazakhstan	W/O	7/7	The pilot, who was drunk, took six passengers on a joy ride, during which he performed stunts. The aircraft crashed in a field near Otar.	
28 April 1969	(Soviet Union) Irkutsk	Tu-104B	CCCP-42436	East Siberia	W/O	Unknown	Landed short of the runway at Irkutsk Airport.	
15 May 1969	(Soviet Union) Novotitarovka	An-2SKh	CCCP-32607	Georgia	W/O	2/2	After being refilled with pesticides for crop-spraying, the co-pilot took a ground mechanic for a ride. The pilot attempted but failed to stop the aircraft as it taxied for takeoff. The co-pilot performed stunts at low altitude until the aircraft struck a 7 m (23 ft) tall tree. The aircraft then struck more trees and a power line pylon before it finally crashed into a house and caught fire.	
23 June 1969	(Soviet Union) Poroslitsy	Il-14M	CCCP-52018	Ukraine	W/O	24/24	The aircraft was en route a domestic scheduled Moscow–Chernigov passenger service as Flight 831. The captain unilaterally decided to increase height, colliding mid-air with a Soviet Air Force Antonov An-12 at 3,000 metres (9,800 ft), over the Poroslitsy village, Yukhnovsky District. The accident killed all 120 occupants aboard both aircraft.	
25 June 1969	(Soviet Union) Mirny	An-12B	CCCP-11380	East Siberia	W/O	0	Starboard main landing gear broke off upon landing at Mirny Airport.	
26 June 1969	(Soviet Union) Magadan	Il-14M	CCCP-91527	Magadan	W/O	3/5	A fire broke out shortly after takeoff from Magadan Airport. While attempting an emergency landing, the aircraft hit trees and crashed. Due to operate a Magadan–Seymchan cargo service.	
28 June 1969	(Soviet Union) near Talas	Il-14G	CCCP-91495	Kyrgyzstan	W/O	40/40	The crew made a wrong turn after takeoff, turning right instead of turning left. The aircraft then flew over mountainous terrain, striking a mountain at 3,150 metres (10,330 ft) some 8.7 km (5.4 mi) to the left of the flight route. The aircraft was operating a domestic scheduled Talas-Frunze (now Bishkek) passenger service as Flight F-28.	
5 July 1969	(Soviet Union) Udokan Range	An-2R	CCCP-09168	Far East	W/O	4/4	Struck a mountain. Between Ust-Nyukzha and Chara the aircraft encountered poor weather with low clouds and rain. While flying along the Khani river valley, the aircraft struck the side of a mountain at 1,800 m (5,900 ft) in the Udokan Range. Wreckage was found on 16 July 1969. The aircraft was operating a Tynda–Ust-Nyukzha–Chara cargo service.	
3 August 1969	(Soviet Union) Preobrazhenka	An-24B	CCCP-46248	Ukraine	W/O	55/55	The aircraft was en route a domestic scheduled Dnepropetrovsk–Vinnitsa passenger service as Flight N-826, when a blade from one of the port propellers separated from the engine. The detached blade punctured the fuselage and severed the controls. The airplane entered a spin and crashed near Preobrazhenka in Dnipropetrovsk Oblast.	
12 August 1969	(Soviet Union) Novosibirsk	An-12B	CCCP-11018	Polar	W/O	4/6	The aircraft was completing the first leg of a Tiksi–Novosibirsk–Moscow cargo service as Flight 5134, when the engines lost power on approach to Novosibirsk Airport; it descended into a forest, 13 kilometres (8.1 mi) away from the airfield, and caught fire.	
19 August 1969	(Soviet Union) Mostki	An-2R	CCCP-96176	Belarus	W/O	5/5	Crashed during a crop-spraying flight. The crew, who was drunk, allowed three passengers on board. The crew performed some maneuvers at low height until the aircraft struck trees at a height of 15–17 m (49–56 ft). The aircraft crashed and caught fire.	
26 August 1969	(Soviet Union) Moscow	Il-18B	CCCP-75708	Moscow	W/O	16/102	Inbound from Norilsk, the crew forgot to lower the landing gear. The aircraft belly landed at Vnukovo Airport, and a fire broke out. The aircraft was operating a Sochi-Norilsk-Moscow passenger service as Flight 1770.	
26 August 1969	(Soviet Union) Khovu-Aksy	An-2T	CCCP-41971	Krasnoyarsk	W/O	14/14	Struck a mountain. The aircraft encountered poor weather, with low clouds over mountainous terrain. Flying through clouds, the aircraft struck a wooded mountain slope at 1,940 m (6,360 ft). The aircraft, operating a domestic scheduled Kyzyl–Khovu-Aksy passenger service as Flight 545, was found a day later.	
1 September 1969	(Soviet Union) near Zaliv Kresta Airfield	Il-14P	CCCP-61731	Magadan	W/O	22/27	The aircraft departed Anadyr but returned due to bad weather at Egvekinot. Three hours later the aircraft took off again. While on approach, the crew drifted to the right during the descent towards land. The crew performed a 180-degree turn over mountainous terrain and the aircraft struck a mountain at 235 m (771 ft), bounced off the top, and slid down the other side to 170 m (560 ft). The aircraft was operating a domestic scheduled Anadyr-Egvekinot passenger service as Flight 55.	
8 September 1969	(Soviet Union) Amderma	An-12B	CCCP-11377	Polar	W/O	5/8	While the aircraft was taxiing at Amderma Airport for departing to Norilsk, it was impacted in the nose by a crashing Soviet Air Force Tupolev Tu-128 that veered off the runway following the collapse of its starboard main undercarriage upon landing. Both airplanes burst into flames. Seven people lost their lives in the accident, of whom two were aboard the military aircraft.	
10 September 1969	(Soviet Union) Yakutsk	Il-18V	CCCP-75791	Krasnoyarsk	W/O	0	Collided with a vehicle after landing at Yakutsk Airport. The aircraft was operating a domestic scheduled Krasnoyarsk-Yakutsk passenger service as Flight 93.	
26 September 1969	(Soviet Union) off Tiksi	An-2	CCCP-44984	Polar	W/O	5/6	Ditched in Tiksi Bay due to engine failure (caused by a manufacturing defect) while approaching Tiksi at night in poor weather.	
12 October 1969	(Soviet Union) Mirny	An-10	CCCP-11169	East Siberia	W/O	0	Landed on icy runway at Mirny Airport.	
13 October 1969	(Soviet Union) Nizhnevartovsk	An-24B	CCCP-47772	Tyumen	W/O	24/56	Crashed some 1 kilometre (0.62 mi) short of the runway, on approach to Nizhnevartovsk Airport, after a feathering of the propellers due to an accidental activation of the de-icing system. The aircraft was completing a domestic scheduled Surgut-Nizhnevartovsk passenger service as Flight 227.	
1 November 1969	(Soviet Union) Kazalinsk	An-2T	CCCP-43847	Kazakhstan	W/O	4/26	Stalled and crashed on takeoff. Before taking off, 12 passengers wanted to fly to Frunze (now Tuganbay); these passengers paid the pilot to board the aircraft. As a result, the aircraft was overloaded and the center of gravity was too far to the rear. The aircraft went into a nose-high altitude on takeoff, lost airspeed, stalled and crashed. The aircraft was operating an Aralsk–Amanutkul–Raym–Oktyabr–Kazalinsk–Frunze–Kaukey–Azhar–Kyzylorda passenger service as Flight 643.	
13 November 1969	(Soviet Union) Amderma	An-12B	CCCP-11376	Polar	W/O	9/9	Crashed on approach to Amderma Airport, 15 kilometres (9.3 mi) away from the airfield, due to icing conditions. The aircraft was operating a Moscow-Amderma-Yakutsk cargo service as Flight 5009.	
25 November 1969	(Soviet Union) Mukachevo	An-2	CCCP-44995	Ukraine	W/O	5/5	En route to Irshava the aircraft encountered poor weather, with low clouds over the mountains. The crew deviated to the left of the flight route, after which the aircraft entered clouds and struck the side of a mountain at 420 m (1,380 ft). The aircraft was operating a Uzhgorod–Mukachevo–Irshava–Khust–Bushtyna passenger service as Flight 3841.	
6 December 1969	(Soviet Union) Khatanga	An-12B	CCCP-11381	Polar	W/O	8/8	The aircraft was completing a Syktyvkar–Khatanga cargo service as Flight 5135 when it crashed 13 kilometres (8.1 mi) off Khatanga Airport, on approach, due to icing.	
9 December 1969	(Soviet Union) Lunino	An-2R	CCCP-35083	East Siberia	W/O	3/3	An An-2 (CCCP-35082) left Penza on a positioning flight to Kazan. CCCP-35083 left three minutes later on the same route. Inexplicably, the crew of the second An-2 wanted to catch up with the first An-2. The crew accelerated, joining up with the first An-2 twenty minutes later, but in the process the engine of CCCP-35083 struck the base of the tail of CCCP-35082, and it crashed out of control while CCCP-35082 was able to land without further incident.	
10 December 1969	(Soviet Union) off Makhachkala	Avia 14P	CCCP-52010	Georgia	W/O	17/17	Two minutes after takeoff, the aircraft was cleared to climb to 2,100 m (6,900 ft) when the pilot reported clouds over the sea, which was not forecast. The aircraft suddenly nosed down and crashed into the sea 3.5 km (2.2 mi) from the shore. The wreckage was found the next day in 10 m (33 ft) of water. While climbing through 400 m (1,300 ft) the aircraft suffered bird strikes, breaking the windshield and incapacitating the pilots. The aircraft was operating a Tbilisi–Makhachkala–Astrakhan passenger service as Flight 2953.	
11 December 1969	Unknown	Il-18B	CCCP-75699	Ural	W/O	0	En route to Tashkent from Sverdlovsk (now Yekaterinburg) the crew mishandled the trim tabs and autopilot. The aircraft entered a dive at 8,800 m (28,900 ft) and descended to 6,600 m (21,700 ft) before the crew regained control. The aircraft was able to make a safe landing, but it had suffered structural damage during the dive and was written off. The fuselage was used to rebuild Il-18V CCCP-74297 after it had been damaged in a fire.	

== See also ==
- Aeroflot accidents and incidents
- Aeroflot accidents and incidents in the 1950s
- Aeroflot accidents and incidents in the 1970s
- Aeroflot accidents and incidents in the 1980s
- Aeroflot accidents and incidents in the 1990s
- Transport in the Soviet Union
