= Flight 207 =

Flight 207 may refer to:

Listed chronologically

- Aeroflot Flight 207, crashed on 10 June 1960
- Kalitta Air Flight 207, suffered a runway overrun on takeoff on 25 May 2008
