= Flight 51 =

Flight 51 may refer to:

- Aeroflot Flight 51, crashed on 30 December 1967
- United Nations Flight 51, crashed on 9 August 1974
- ACE Air Cargo Flight 51, crashed on 8 March 2013
- Siberian Light Aviation Flight 51, crashed on 12 September 2021
