= Flight 245 =

Flight 245 may refer to:

- Air India Flight 245, crashed on 3 November 1950
- Aeroflot Flight 245, crashed on 17 December 1961
