= Flight 826 =

Flight 826 may refer to

- United Airlines Flight 826. Mid-air collision on 16 December 1960
- Aeroflot Flight 826, crashed on 3 August 1969
- United Airlines Flight 826, experienced extreme turbulence on 28 December 1997
