= Aeroflot Flight 036 =

1960 aviation accident

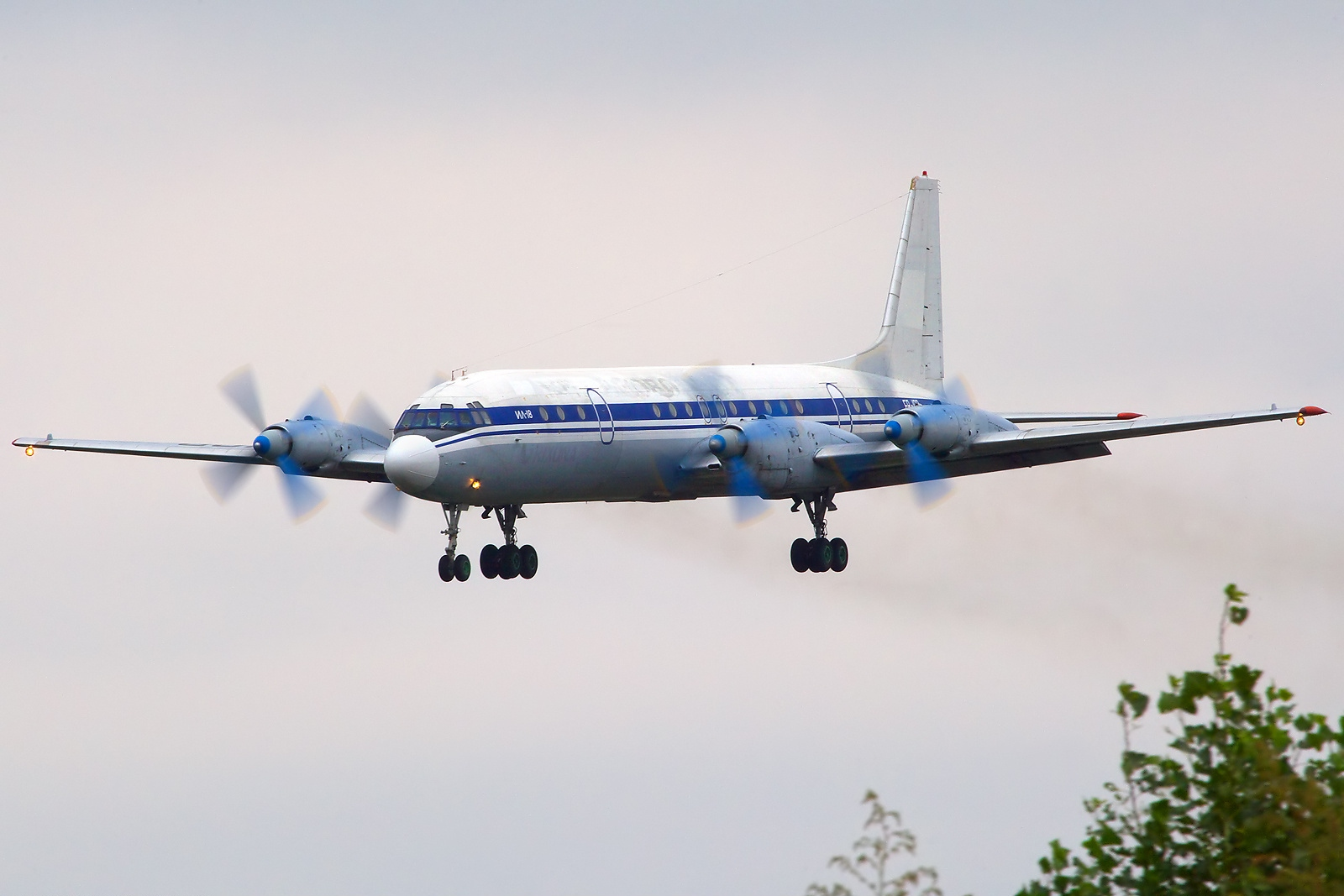
- An Ilyushin Il-18 similar to the accident aircraft

Accident
- Date: 17 August 1960
- Summary: Engine fire
- Site: Near Tarasovich, Ukraine

Aircraft
- Aircraft type: Ilyushin Il-18
- Operator: Aeroflot
- Registration: CCCP-75705
- Flight origin: Cairo International Airport, Cairo, Egypt
- Destination: Bykovo Airport, Moscow, USSR
- Occupants: 34
- Passengers: 27
- Crew: 7
- Fatalities: 34
- Survivors: 0

Aeroflot Flight 036 was a regularly scheduled passenger flight operated by Aeroflot from Cairo International Airport in Cairo, Egypt, to Bykovo Airport in Moscow, Soviet Union. On 17 August 1960, the Ilyushin Il-18 flying this route crashed after an engine fire. All 27 passengers and seven crew members were killed. The Air Accident Investigation Commission determined that an externally leaking fuel injector was the root cause of the accident.

== Accident ==
Flight 036 was at cruising altitude and had just passed the check point at Codra, Kiev, when at 15:52 the crew reported to air traffic control (ATC) that they had feathered the propeller of engine No. 4 and requested an emergency landing attempt at Boryspil International Airport. At 15:57 Flight 36 reported the No. 4 engine and right wing were on fire. ATC recommended landing at Kyiv International Airport (Zhuliany) which was closer, but then at 1557:30 the crew made a final radio transmission "We're falling, falling, goodbye, falling, falling, falling ...". The airliner crashed approximately 41 km north of Kyiv International Airport. There were no survivors.

== Aircraft ==
Construction of the Il-18B involved, serial number 189001702 017-02, was completed at Moscow Banner of Labor production factory in 1959 and it was transferred to the civil air fleet. It was powered by four Ivchenko AI-20 turboprop engines and at the time of the accident, the aircraft had sustained a total of 407 flight hours and 117 takeoff/landing cycles.

== Investigation ==
For the length of the investigation all Il-18's in the Soviet Union were grounded. Investigators found part of the right wing and engines No. 1 and 4 some distance away from the main crash site. After eight months the Air Accident Investigation Commission were able to determine that the No. 4 engine detached from the right wing due to fire damaging its supporting structure. The fuel tanks inside the right wing ruptured causing a fireball which demolished the right wing. The aircraft began an uncontrolled descent, during which, the No. 1 engine also separated from its wing. Completely out of control, the aircraft with landing gear and flaps extended, crashed near Tarasovichi, 41 km north of Kyiv International Airport.

The Commission discovered the number seven fuel injector of engine No. 4 began leaking fuel onto the engine, accumulating in the housing. This fuel eventually ignited after contact with high temperature components. A contributing factor to the accident was a lack of engine fire extinguishing systems.

As a result of the accident and investigation several changes to the Il-18's engines were implemented. An engine fire suppression system with provisions for the flame retardant to be sprayed directly onto the engines rear support was developed. The engines firewall construction was changed to titanium and plumbing material was changed from an aluminum alloy to steel.

== See also ==
- Aeroflot accidents and incidents
- Aeroflot accidents and incidents in the 1960s
