= Aeroflot Flight 1668 =

1968 aviation accident

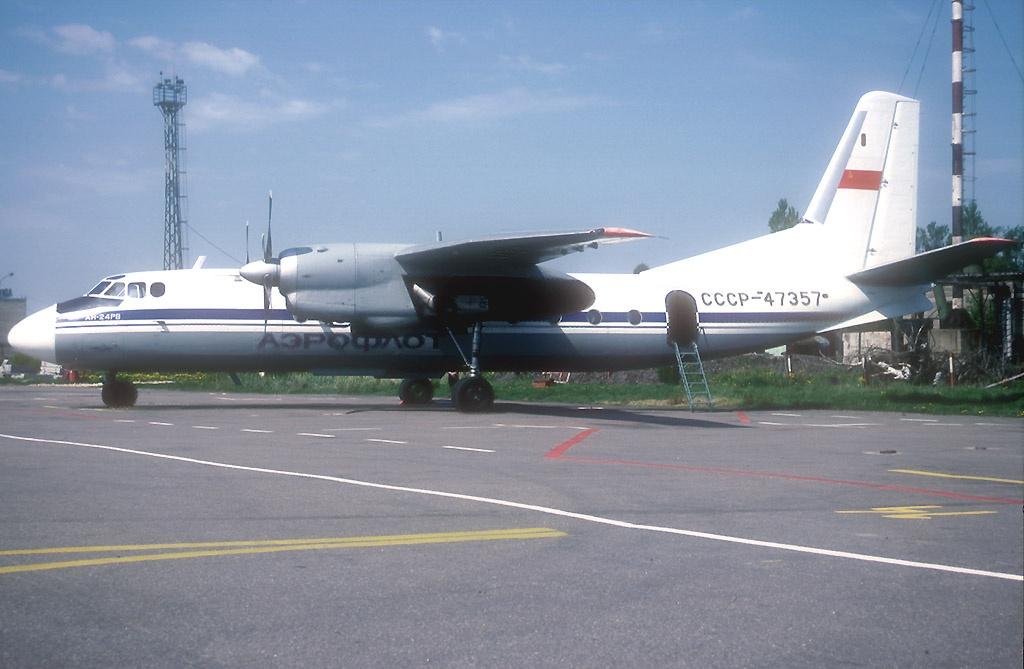
- An-24 CCCP-47357, sister ship of the accident aircraft

Accident
- Date: 6 January 1968
- Summary: Loss of control for reasons unknown, possible structural failure or an aircraft flight control system failed

Aircraft
- Aircraft type: Antonov An-24B
- Operator: Aeroflot
- Registration: CCCP-47733
- Flight origin: Yakutsk Airport Sakha Republic, Russia
- 1st stopover: Olyokminsk Airport
- 2nd stopover: Lensk Airport
- 3rd stopover: Ust-Kut Airport
- Last stopover: Yemelyanovo International Airport
- Destination: Tolmachevo Airport
- Passengers: 39
- Crew: 6
- Fatalities: 45
- Survivors: 0

Aeroflot Flight 1668 was a scheduled flight from Yakutsk to Novosibirsk with stopovers at Olekminsk, Lensk, Ust-Kut and Krasnoyarsk that crashed shortly after take-off from Olekminsk on 6 January 1968. All 45 people on board died. The subsequent investigation was unable to determine the root cause of the accident.

== Accident ==
At 18:10 local time the flight departed Olyokminsk bound for Lensk in good weather conditions. Ten minutes later the crew contacted air traffic control (ATC) and reported their altitude as 4,500 meters. At 18:24 the flight requested a position report and ATC responded that radar showed the aircraft 75 kilometers from Olyokminsk on a heading of 271 degrees. At 18:28 radar contact with the aircraft was lost and attempts to communicate with the flight by radio were unsuccessful. Three hours and 22 minutes later the crew of an Antonov An-2 flying west of Olekminsk discovered several fires burning on the ground. Helicopters sent to investigate discovered the crash site. The next day at 16:00 search teams reached the wreckage of flight 1668. There were no survivors.

== Aircraft ==
Construction of the Antonov An-24B involved, serial number 69901001, was completed at the Antonov aircraft factory on 27 November 1966. At the time of the accident, the aircraft had sustained a total of 1,543 flight hours and 1,083 takeoff and landing cycles.

== Aftermath ==
Members of the search and rescue team recorded their eyewitness accounts of the approximately 715 meters wide crash site:

In the winter of 1968, we, the young aircraft technicians, were mobilized to search the area where the wreckage of the aircraft fell. There were severe frosts. Christmas was coming. The forest consisted of a thick fir grove, and all the trees were hung with small multicolored patches - the remnants of clothes torn from people, like Christmas trees. The sight was creepy...

But the young girl fastened to the miraculously surviving chair made the strongest impression on everyone. She apparently did not suffer in any way, and seemed to be a fabulous fairytale who had fallen asleep in this magical dressed up Christmas forest ...

== Investigation ==
The accident was investigated by the State Supervisory Commission for Flight Safety. Concerns about crew training, preflight preparation of the aircraft and ATC operation were eliminated early in the investigation. The agency compiled data from ATC including recorded radio transmissions and radar plots in an attempt to determine the cause. Two minutes before the flight disappeared from radar the sound of a transmitter being switched on was heard. The source of this transmitter sound was never determined. Investigators discovered that the aircraft suddenly entered a steep descent followed by both wings and the empennage separating from the fuselage due to high aerodynamic loads. At about 18:27 the airliner was in an 80 degree nose down attitude on a heading of 270 with a left bank. The aircraft struck trees then crashed into the ground heavily and was completely destroyed by impact forces and fire.

Investigations were unable to determine the exact cause of the accident but it was theorized that a part of the aircraft detached and damaged the tail or that an aircraft flight control system failed. Another theory was that the flight was brought down by a surface-to-air missile, but no evidence supporting this ever surfaced.

== See also ==
- Aeroflot accidents and incidents
- Aeroflot accidents and incidents in the 1960s
