= Aeroflot Flight 068 =

1961 aviation accident in Russia

- The crash site of Aeroflot Flight 068

Accident
- Date: 16 March 1961
- Summary: Emergency landing after contained engine failure, due to crew shutting down working engine
- Site: near Koltsovo Airport; 56°46′28″N 60°41′06″E
- Total fatalities: 7

Aircraft
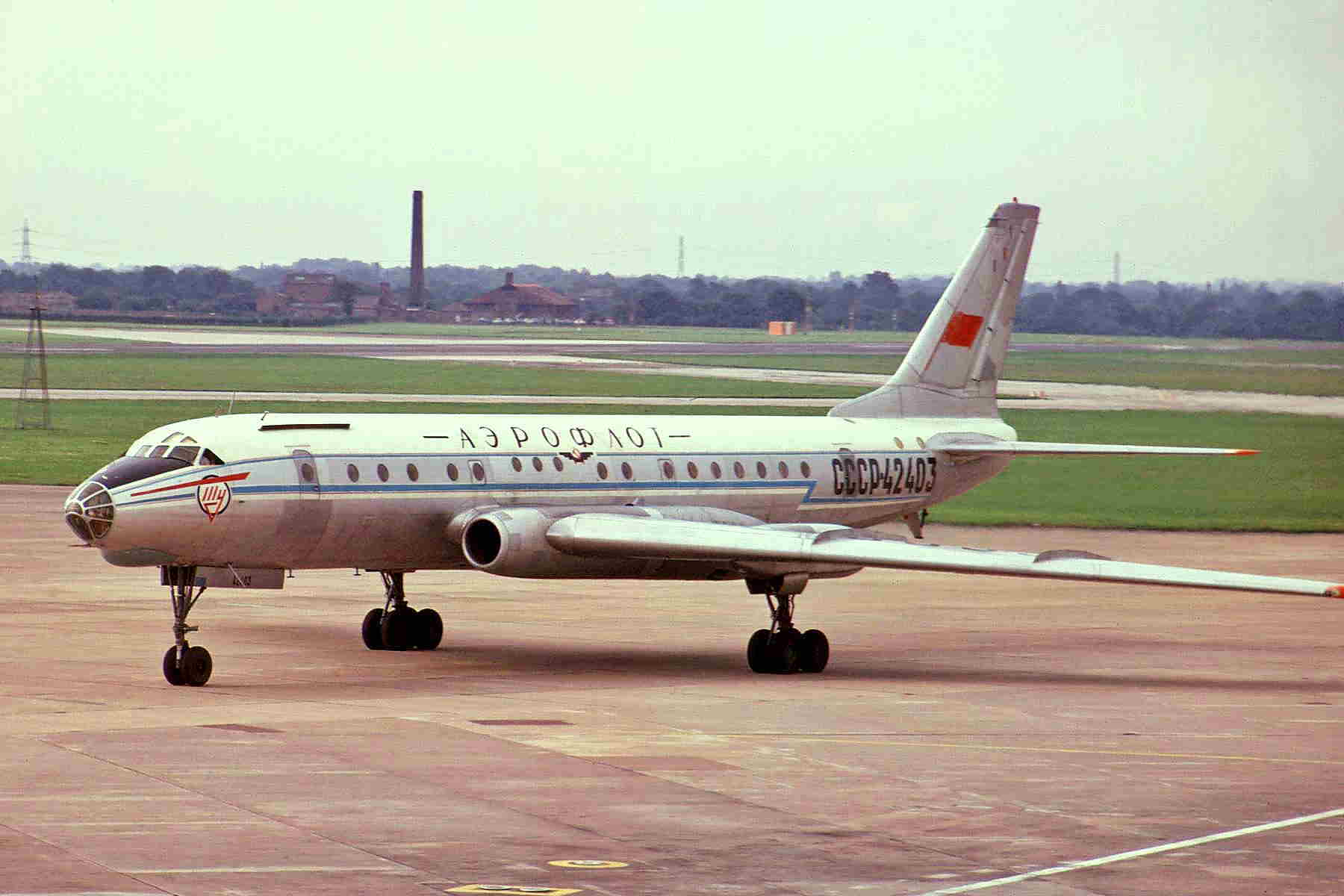
- A Tupolev Tu-104B similar to the accident aircraft
- Aircraft type: Tupolev Tu-104B
- Operator: Aeroflot
- Registration: CCCP-42438
- Flight origin: Khabarovsk Novy Airport, Khabarovsk
- 1st stopover: Tolmachevo Airport, Novosibirsk
- Last stopover: Koltsovo Airport, Sverdlovsk
- Destination: Pulkovo Airport, Saint Petersburg
- Occupants: 51
- Passengers: 41
- Crew: 10
- Fatalities: 5
- Injuries: 31
- Survivors: 46

Ground casualties
- Ground fatalities: 2

Aeroflot Flight 068 was a regularly scheduled passenger flight operated by Aeroflot from Khabarovsk to Saint Petersburg with intermediate stops at Novosibirsk, then Koltsovo Airport in Yekaterinburg. On 16 March 1961, following an engine failure shortly after takeoff from Koltsovo Airport, the Tupolev Tu-104B operating this flight made an emergency landing on a frozen lake. Two crew members and three passengers died, along with two people on the ground, however 46 of those on board survived.

== Aircraft ==
The aircraft involved was a Tupolev Tu-104B.

== Investigation ==
Metal fatigue cracks caused a blade on the second stage of the compressor failed after takeoff, resulting in the failure of the right engine and severe vibrations. The left engine's inadvertent shut down was also cited as a contributing factor.

== See also ==
- Aeroflot accidents and incidents
- Aeroflot accidents and incidents in the 1960s
- Kegworth air disaster
- TransAsia Airways Flight 235
- Airlink Flight 8911
