= Aeroflot Flight 2230 =

1967 aviation accident in Russia

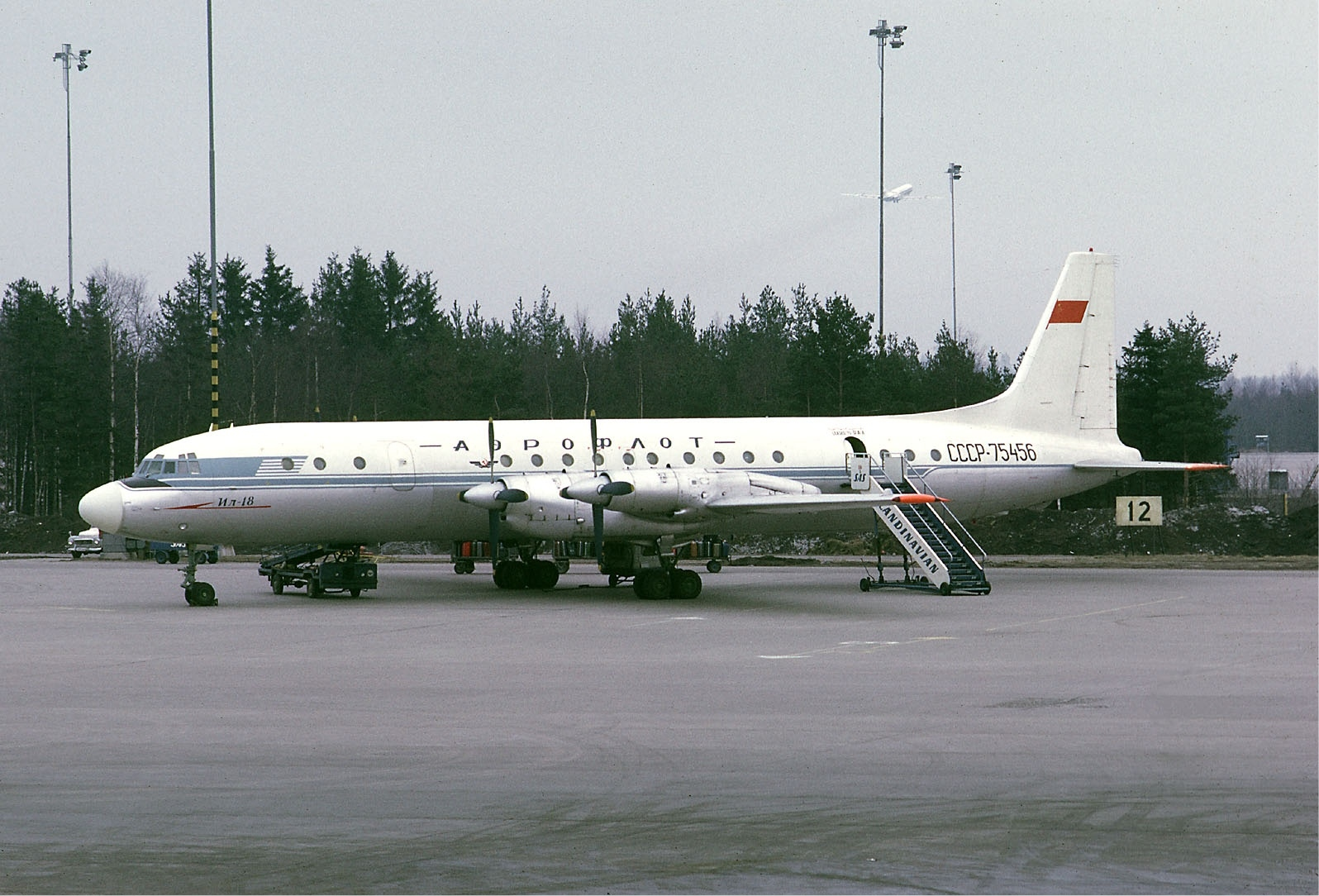
- An Aeroflot Ilyushin Il-18, similar to the accident aircraft

Accident
- Date: 16 November 1967
- Summary: Engine failure and fire followed by an electrical failure of cockpit instruments
- Site: 2.9 km (1.8 mi) east of Koltsovo Airport

Aircraft
- Aircraft type: Ilyushin Il-18V
- Operator: Aeroflot
- Registration: CCCP-75538
- Flight origin: Koltsovo Airport, Yekaterinburg
- Destination: Tashkent Yuzhny Airport, Tashkent
- Passengers: 99
- Crew: 8
- Fatalities: 107
- Survivors: 0

Aeroflot Flight 2230 was a Soviet domestic passenger flight from Yekaterinburg (then Sverdlovsk) to Tashkent. On 16 November 1967, the Ilyushin Il-18 aircraft serving the flight crashed after takeoff, killing all 107 people aboard (including twelve children). At the time, it was the deadliest aviation accident in the Russian SFSR and the worst accident involving the Il-18.

== Aircraft ==
The flight was serviced by an Ilyushin Il-18V turboprop airliner, manufactured on 25 March 1964 with a serial number 184007002. The aircraft made its maiden flight and commenced operations in the same year. On the day of the accident it had 5,326 flight hours and 2,111 flight cycles.

== Crew ==
The crew consisted of the pilot in command Yuri Abaturov, co-pilot Nikolai Mikhaylov, navigating officer Anatoly Zagorsky, flight engineer Viktor Ospishchev and radio officer Yuri Yefremov.

== Accident ==
Shortly after takeoff from Sverdlovsk, now called Ekaterinburg, Koltsovo Airport an engine caught fire and its propeller could not be feathered. Maneuverability at maximum takeoff weight with a propeller causing drag was difficult. The crew lost control at a height of 200 m (660 ft) while climbing at a speed of 340–350 km/h (180–190 kn) at an altitude of 140–150 m (460–490 ft). The Il-18 crashed into a plowed field at a 37 degrees right bank at a speed of 440 km/h (240 kn) at 21:02 local time. The aircraft completely disintegrated, complicating the subsequent accident investigation. There were also fire outbreaks at the crash site.
