= Richardson Lakes =

Group of lakes in Antarctica

- Location of Richardson Lakes
- Interactive map of Richardson Lakes
- Location: Mount Riiser-Larsen, Australian Antarctic Territory
- Coordinates: 66°45′S 50°38′E
- Type: Meltwater lakes
- Etymology: Sgt. Alan K. Richardson
- Basin countries: Antarctica
- Managing agency: Australian Antarctic Division
- Max. depth: 156 metres (512 ft)
- Frozen: Year round
- References: Coordinates:

Richardson Lakes is a small group of meltwater lakes located at the foot of Mount Riiser-Larsen on the northwest side, close east of Amundsen Bay in Antarctica. It was photographed in 1956 by ANARE (Australian National Antarctic Research Expeditions) aircraft and first visited in November 1958 by an ANARE party led by G.A. Knuckey. It was named for Sgt. Alan K. Richardson, RAAF, a member of the 1958 RAAF Antarctic Flight at Mawson Station.

== Environmental study ==
In 1998, a core sample was taken of the sediment on the floor the Richardson Lake during a Japanese Antarctic Research Expedition. The sample was found to consist of clay and several kinds of diatom fructules. Diatom fructules are a genera of algae, specifically microalgae, found in the oceans, waterways and soils of the world. Within the sample, at a depth of 123 and 131.5 cm (48.4 and 51.8 in), were examples of chrysophyta cyst., which produce oxygen via photosynthesis. The levels of chrysophyta found varied by depth potentially mean a prolonged melting occurred in Antarctica which matches with a worldwide warming event in 2000~4000yrBP.

Two layers were found in the core sample, one darker and one lighter, suggesting a long term event that allowed the lake to melt and biological material, namely the chrysophyta, to exist over long periods. The lighter the sample, the closer to the cooling of the planet and the lakes eventual refreezing.
