= Aeroflot Flight 245 =

Aviation accident

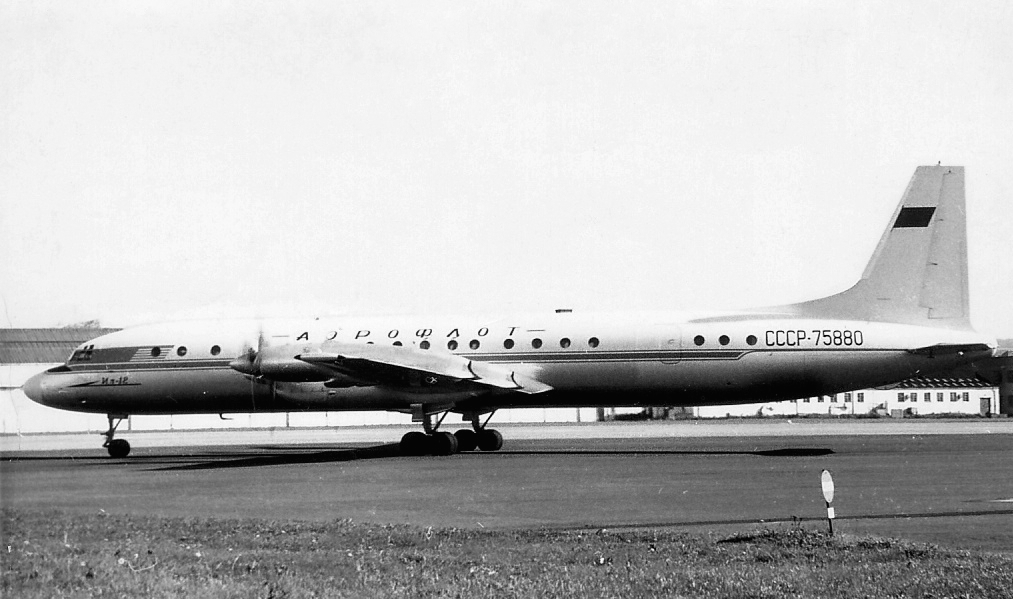
- An Ilyushin Il-18 similar to the accident aircraft

Accident
- Date: 17 December 1961
- Summary: Crew error due to accidental in-flight deployment of flaps; loss of control
- Site: 10 km east of Chebotovka, Rostov Oblast

Aircraft
- Aircraft type: Ilyushin Il-18
- Operator: Aeroflot
- Registration: CCCP-75654
- Flight origin: Vnukovo International Airport, Moscow, USSR
- Destination: Sochi International Airport, Sochi, USSR
- Occupants: 59
- Passengers: 50
- Crew: 9
- Fatalities: 59
- Survivors: 0

Aeroflot Flight 245 was a scheduled domestic passenger flight from Vnukovo International Airport in Moscow, Soviet Union, to Sochi International Airport in Sochi, Soviet Union. On 17 December 1961, the Ilyushin Il-18B flying this route crashed during the cruise phase of the flight, resulting in the death of all 59 people on board. An investigation revealed the aircraft entered a steep dive after the flaps were accidentally extended.

== Accident ==
Flight 245 was a scheduled passenger flight from Vnukovo to Sochi. At 14:34 Moscow time the Il-18 departed Vnukovo International Airport and climbed to its cruising altitude of 8,000 m (26,000 ft). At 15:47 the crew contacted ATC and gave a position report, then the flight again communicated with ATC at 15:52. At 15:59 the controller was unable to raise flight 245 and it disappeared from radar. While in level flight cruising at 630 km/h the flight engineer inadvertently moved the flaps selector to full extension of 40 degrees and due to the large amount of drag and the Il-18's peculiar aerodynamic design the aircraft pitched over and entered a steep descent. Without retracting the flaps it would be almost impossible to regain control of the aircraft and due to the high negative g-force the crew were experiencing they could not reach the flap selector. As the airliner gained speed in its dive the port and starboard flap assemblies were ripped from the wing by high aerodynamic forces. At 16:00 the aircraft impacted the ground at very high speed with the landing gear retracted and at a pitch angle of 107 degrees. The impact crater measured from 3.5 to 5 meters deep and the debris field was 300 to 350 meters in width.

== Aircraft ==
The aircraft involved was an Ilyushin Il-18B, serial number 188000503 and registered as CCCP-75654 to Aeroflot. The construction of the airliner was completed on 30 October 1958 and it had sustained a total of 2,722 flight hours before the crash.

== Investigation ==
Investigators determined that the cause of the accident was the deployment of full flaps at cruising speed. Unlike the Ilyushin Il-14 aircraft, the Il-18 did not have a mechanism to prevent accidental flap selector movement and this was found to be a contributing factor in the accident sequence.

== See also ==
- Aeroflot accidents and incidents
- Aeroflot accidents and incidents in the 1960s
