= Svetilnoye =

Svetilnoye Светильное
- Selo
- Location within Amur Oblast Location within Russia
- Coordinates: 51°57′N 127°50′E
- Country: Russia
- Region: Amur Oblast
- District: Shimanovsky District
- Time zone: UTC+9:00

Svetilnoye (Russian: Светильное) is a rural locality (a selo) in Seletkansky Selsoviet of Shimanovsky District, Amur Oblast, Russia. The population was 97 as of 2018. There are 3 streets.

== Geography ==
Svetilnoye is located on the Bolshaya Pyora River, 17 km southeast of Shimanovsk (the district's administrative centre) by road. Seletkan is the nearest rural locality.
