= Aeroflot Flight 207 =

1960 aviation accident

Coordinates: 42.866°N 43.307°E

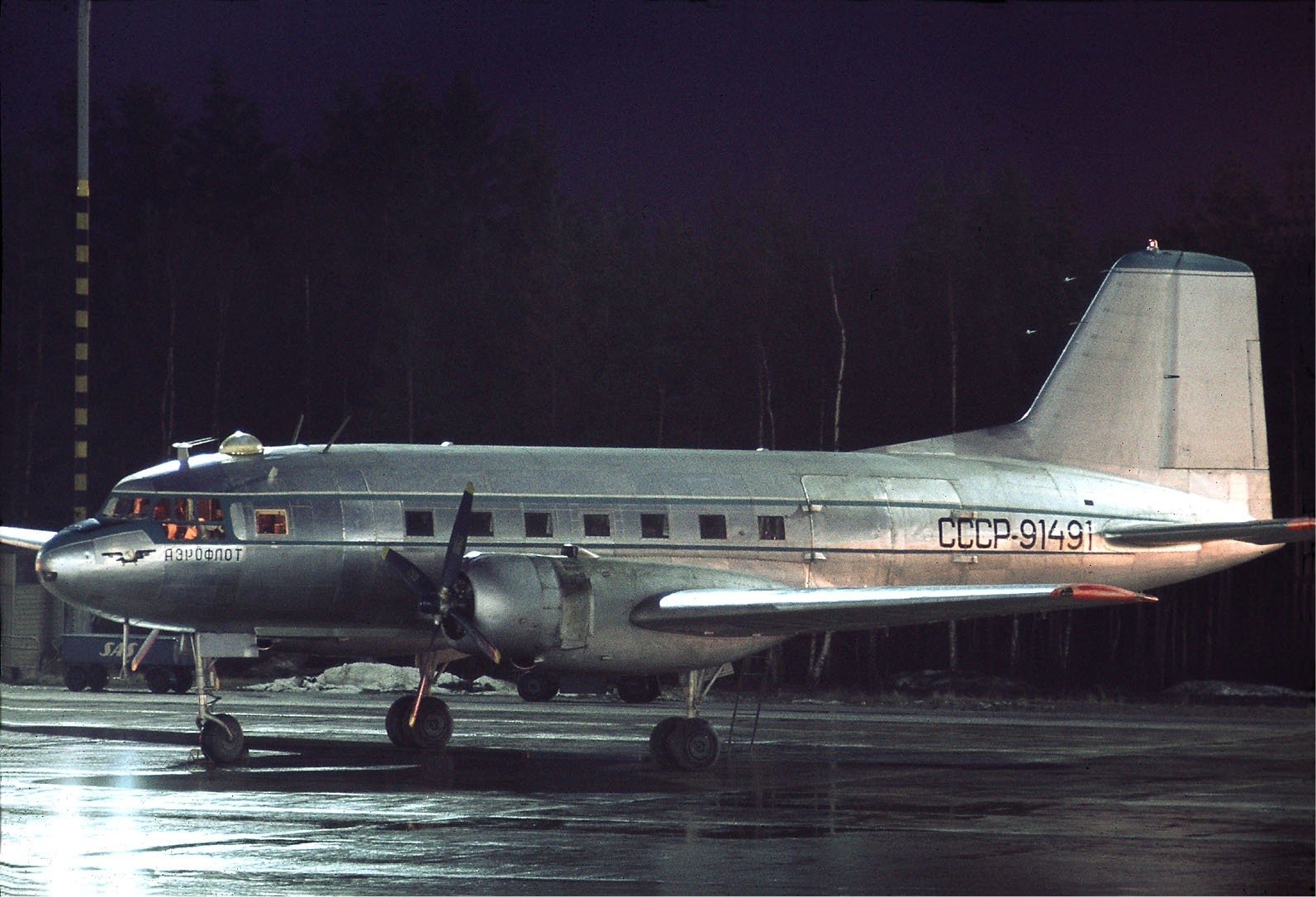

Accident
- Date: 10 June 1960
- Summary: CFIT
- Site: Mount Rech, near Tkvarcheli

Aircraft
- Aircraft type: Ilyushin Il-14M
- Operator: Aeroflot (North Caucasus GVF, 77 ATO)
- Registration: СССР-91571
- Flight origin: Rostov-on-Don Airport
- 1st stopover: Krasnodar International Airport
- 2nd stopover: Adler/Sochi Airport
- 3rd stopover: Sukhumi Babushara Airport
- Last stopover: Kutaisi Airport
- Destination: Tbilisi International Airport
- Passengers: 24
- Crew: 7
- Fatalities: 31
- Survivors: 0

Aeroflot Flight 207 was a Soviet domestic passenger flight from Rostov-on-Don Airport to Tbilisi International Airport that crashed on 10 June 1960 in the Tkvarcheli district. The crash involved an Ilyushin Il-14 aircraft operated by Aeroflot. There were 24 passengers and 7 crew on board, all of whom perished in the crash.

== Aircraft ==
The Il-14P with a serial number of 7343107 and serial 31-07 would be released by the Tashkent Aviation Plant on 7 August 1957, after which it was sold to the General Directorate of the civil air fleet. The airliner received the tail number CCCP-Л1571 and was sent to the 77th air transport detachment of the North Caucasus Territorial Directorate of the civil air fleet. In 1958 or 1959, due to re-registration, the tail number was changed to CCCP-91571. In total, at the time of the crash, the aircraft had total 5423 flight hours.

== Accident ==
The crew on Flight 207 were carrying out a flight from Rostov-on-Don to Tbilisi with stopovers in Krasnodar, Sochi, Sukhumi and Kutaisi. At 10:07 Moscow time, the plane, with 24 passengers and 7 crew members on board, took off from Sochi airport. According to the weather forecast, variable stratocumulus clouds with a ceiling of 600–1000 meters and visibility more than 10 km (6.2 mi) was expected en route. At 10:31 the crew contacted the dispatch center in Sukhumi and reported entering their area of responsibility. Also, a request was made for permission to fly over without landing, since there were no passengers to disembark at Sukhumi. The dispatcher instructed them to climb to and maintain an altitude of 1,200 m (3,900 ft). At 10:45 the aircraft reported on the progress of the flight under the Visual flight rules and permission was received to make the flight without landing. After that, Flight 207 did not contact the dispatcher in Sukhumi.

At 10:55, the crew tried to contact the dispatcher at the Kutaisi airport. During the call the transmission was unexpectedly interrupted. At the same time, the Il-14, flying in the clouds at an altitude of 1,200 m (3,900 ft), 51 km (32 mi)east of Sukhumi airport and 17 km (11 mi) north of the prescribed route, crashed into the cloud-covered mountain of Rech (altitude 1,436 m (4,711 ft)), near Tkvarcheli. After the initial impact with trees, the plane broke in two and after 80 m (260 ft), the fuselage fell down a mountain slope. The completely destroyed and burned out plane was found the next day. All the people on board had been killed.

== Cause ==
During the investigation, it was established that Flights 207 and 208 (return) were being performed by the North Caucasus Directorate for the first time, and that the tasking for 77 squadron had been issued 10 days earlier. However, the crew had been assembled in a hurry, and only a day before the flight, on 9 June, there was no flight mechanic or radio operator during training. Although the flight route was considered difficult, the crew had not flown it, and also did not include a navigator. In addition, the crew commander Samus did not have permission to work independently on passenger flights, so the instructor pilot who had returned from vacation on 7 June, that is, 3 days before the flight, was included in the crew. Poorly guided during the flight, as well as not knowing and underestimating the meteorological situation, the crew as a result deviated north of the route. In turn, the Sukhumi dispatchers did not control the flight of Flight 207 on radar and did not carry out continuous radio communication with it. Having flown 100 kilometers within 20 minutes, the crew did not receive a single location message or information on what course it was flying. It was also established that the flights on this route were carried out according to outdated instructions, which in many respects contradicted the existing instructions for the planning of flights (NPP-GA-58).

According to the commission, the causes of the incident were:

1. The pilot-in-command did not take the control bearing and did not require the Sukhumi dispatcher to report actual weather and location of the aircraft, instead ceasing radio contact with Sukhumi.
2. The flight manager, having information about the weather, did not transmit it to the crew, and also did not ensure that his shift would control the flight.
3. The flight controller supervised the flight only on communication from the crew.
4. The radio duties were performed by an intern, although they should not have been allowed to work independently; they did not conduct continuous monitoring of the flight.

== See also ==
- Aeroflot accidents and incidents
- Aeroflot accidents and incidents in the 1960s
