= Aeroflot Flight N-826 =

1969 aviation accident

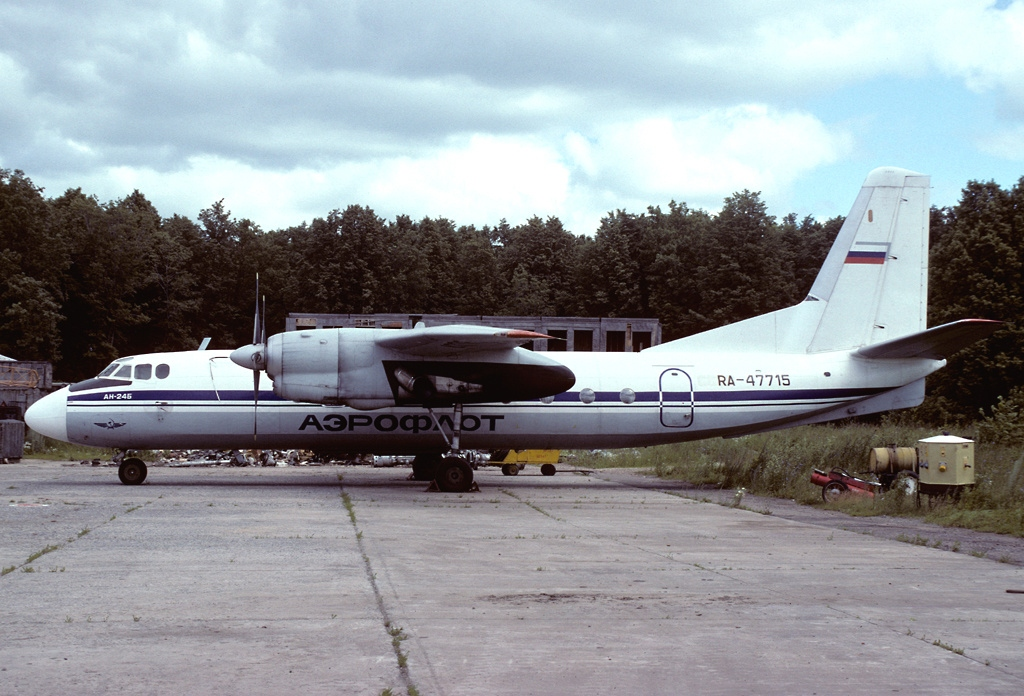
- An Antonov An-24B similar to accident aircraft

Accident
- Date: 3 August 1969
- Summary: Mechanical malfunction due to metal fatigue leading to an explosive decompression
- Site: Preobrazhenka, Krynychky Raion, Ukrainian SSR

Aircraft
- Aircraft type: Antonov An-24
- Operator: Aeroflot
- Registration: CCCP-46248
- Flight origin: Luhansk International Airport
- Destination: Lviv Danylo Halytskyi International Airport
- Occupants: 55
- Passengers: 51
- Crew: 4
- Fatalities: 55
- Survivors: 0

On Sunday 3 August 1969 an Antonov An-24 operating Aeroflot Flight N-826 (Russian: Рейс N-826 Аэрофлота Reys N-826 Aeroflota) crashed resulting in the death of all 55 people on board. An investigation revealed the cause of the accident was an in flight failure of the propeller attached to "No. 1" (left) engine, which caused an explosive decompression.

== Accident ==
Flight N-826 was a scheduled passenger flight from Voroshilovgrad to Lviv, with stops at Dnipropetrovsk and Vinnytsia. At 15:47 (3:47 PM), the aircraft departed Dnipropetrovsk. At 15:58(3:58 PM), the crew reported an altitude of 3,600 meters (11,800 ft) and received permission from ATC to climb to 4,200 m (13,800 ft). This was the last radio transmission from Flight N-826. While climbing through 4,000 meters (around 13,100 ft), the No. 2 propeller blade of the left engine separated from its hub and punctured the fuselage, severing control cables for the stabilizer, ailerons, and rudder, rendering the aircraft uncontrollable. Because of the imbalance, the left propeller detached. The aircraft then banked left and entered a descent with its airspeed increasing. After a steep spiral, the airliner struck the ground at an angle of 45-50 degrees and at a speed of 500-550 km/h. At 16:06(4:06 PM), ATC tried to communicate with Flight N-826, but received no answer. All further attempts at communication with the An-24 were unsuccessful.

== Aircraft ==
The aircraft involved was an Antonov An-24B, serial number 77303206 and registered as CCCP-46248, and was handed over to the Lvovski aviation detachment of the Ukrainian Department of the Civil Air Fleet. The AN-24's production date was 23 March 1967, and at the time of the crash, it had a total of 4,557 flight hours with 4,789 pressurization cycles.

== Investigation ==
Investigators discovered the propeller blade failed due to a fatigue fracture caused by corrosion, which led to it hitting the fuselage, which destroyed all the control cables, making the crash inevitable.

== See also ==
- Aeroflot accidents and incidents
- Aeroflot accidents and incidents in the 1960s
- Reeve Aleutian Airways Flight 8
- Pan Am Flight 202
