= Alexeyevka, Kazakhstan =

Alexeyevka Алексеевка
- Location within Kazakhstan
- Coordinates: 53°30′54″N 69°30′40″E
- Country: Kazakhstan
- Region: Aktobe
- District: Zerendi

Population (2009)
  - Total: 1,560
- Time zone: UTC+5 (West Kazakhstan Time)
  - Summer (DST): UTC+5 (West Kazakhstan Time)

Alexeyevka (Kazakh: Алексеевка, Alekseevka) is a settlement in Zerendi District of Akmola Region, Kazakhstan, located 27 km north of Kokshetau. The population as of 2009 was 1560. The settlement also houses Dolomite mining facilities.

It lies on the Nur-Sultan — Petropavl highway and Kokshetau — Petropavl railroad.
