= 1969 Vnukovo Airport Il-18 crash =

Aviation accident in the Soviet Union

Aeroflot Flight 1770
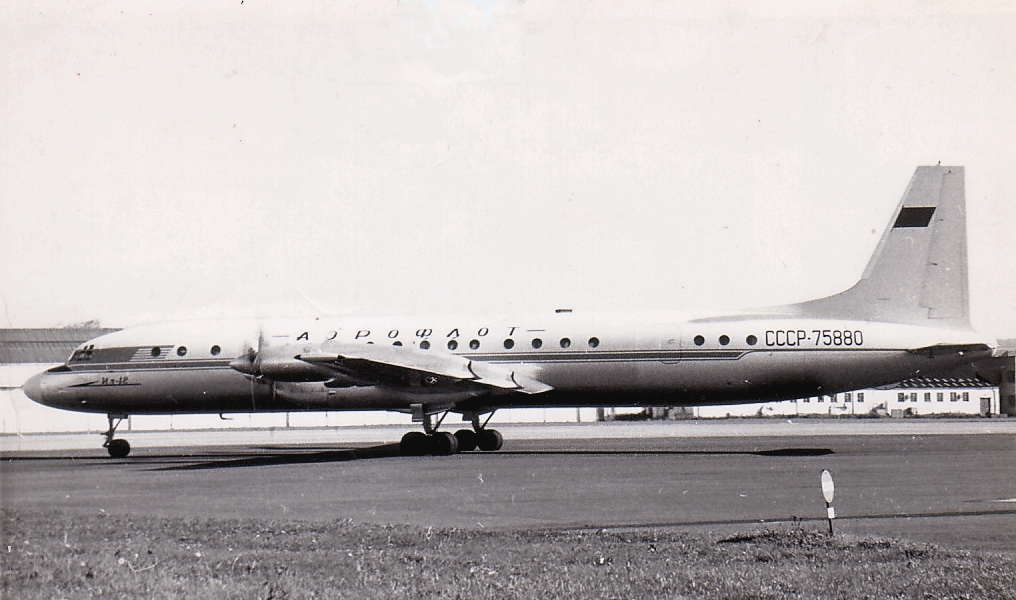
- An Ilyushin Il-18B of Aeroflot, similar to the aircraft involved

Accident
- Date: 26 August 1969
- Summary: Pilot error leading to belly landing
- Site: Vnukovo Airport; 55°35′39″N 37°16′20″E

Aircraft
- Aircraft type: Ilyushin Il-18B
- Operator: Aeroflot (Moscow TU GA, Vnukovsky OAO)
- Registration: CCCP-75708
- Flight origin: Adler Airport, Sochi
- Stopover: Vnukovo Airport, Moscow
- Destination: Alykel Airport, Norilsk
- Occupants: 101
- Passengers: 94
- Crew: 7
- Fatalities: 16
- Survivors: 85

On August 26, 1969, an Il-18 of Aeroflot landed without its landing gear and burst into flames during landing at Vnukovo Airport. The flight was a scheduled domestic flight from Sochi to Moscow and Norilsk, carrying 94 passengers and 7 crew members. 16 of the 101 occupants died - 85 survived.

== See also ==
- Aeroflot Flight 521
