= Găvănoasa =

- Commune
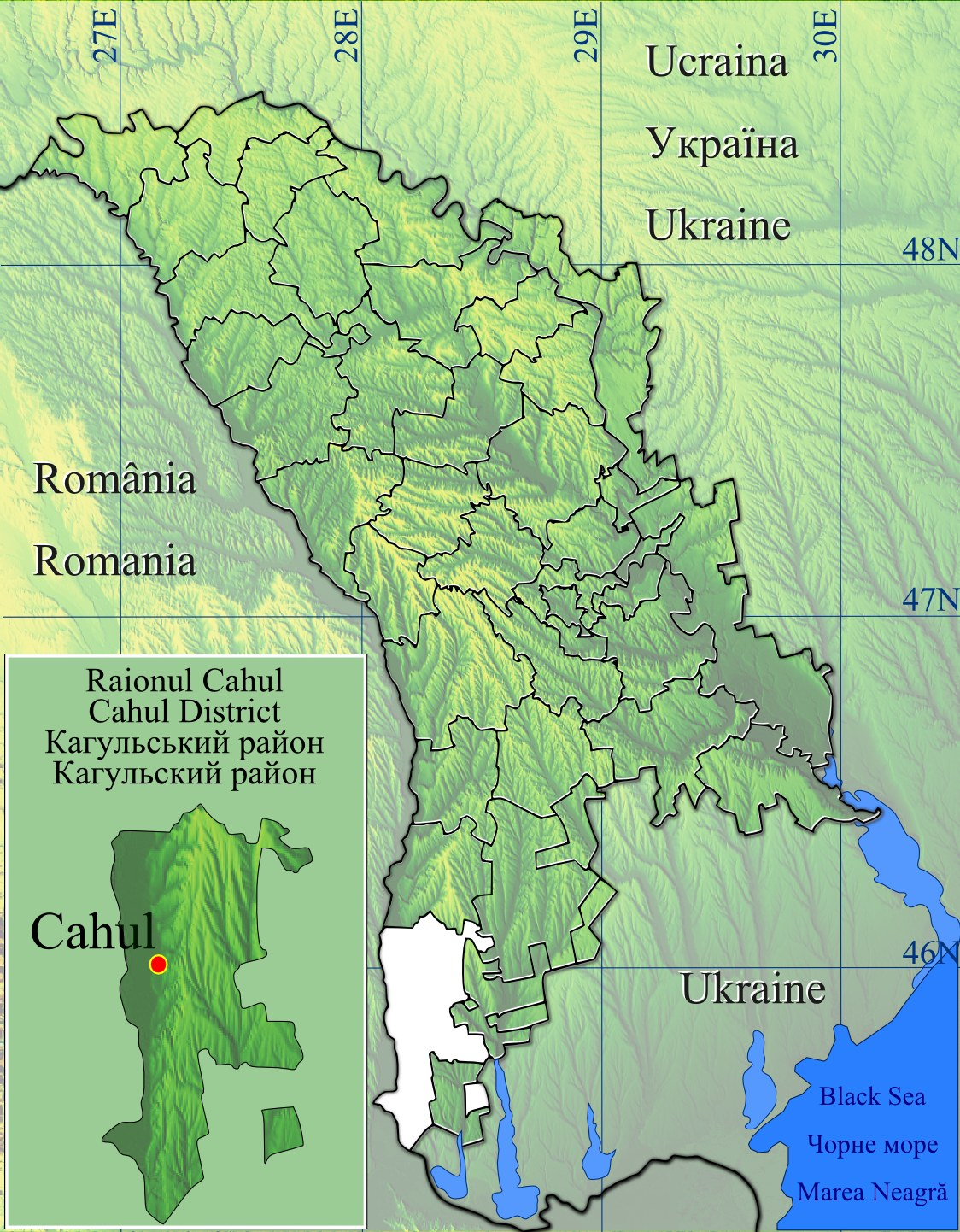
- Location within Cahul
- Coordinates: 45°46′8″N 28°22′52″E
- Country: Moldova
- District: Cahul District

Population (2014)
  - Total: 2,111
- Time zone: UTC+2 (EET)
  - Summer (DST): UTC+3 (EEST)
- Postal code: MD-5317

Găvănoasa is a commune in Cahul District, Moldova. It is composed of three villages: Găvănoasa, Nicolaevca and Vladimirovca.
