= Aeroflot Flight L-51 =

1967 aviation accident

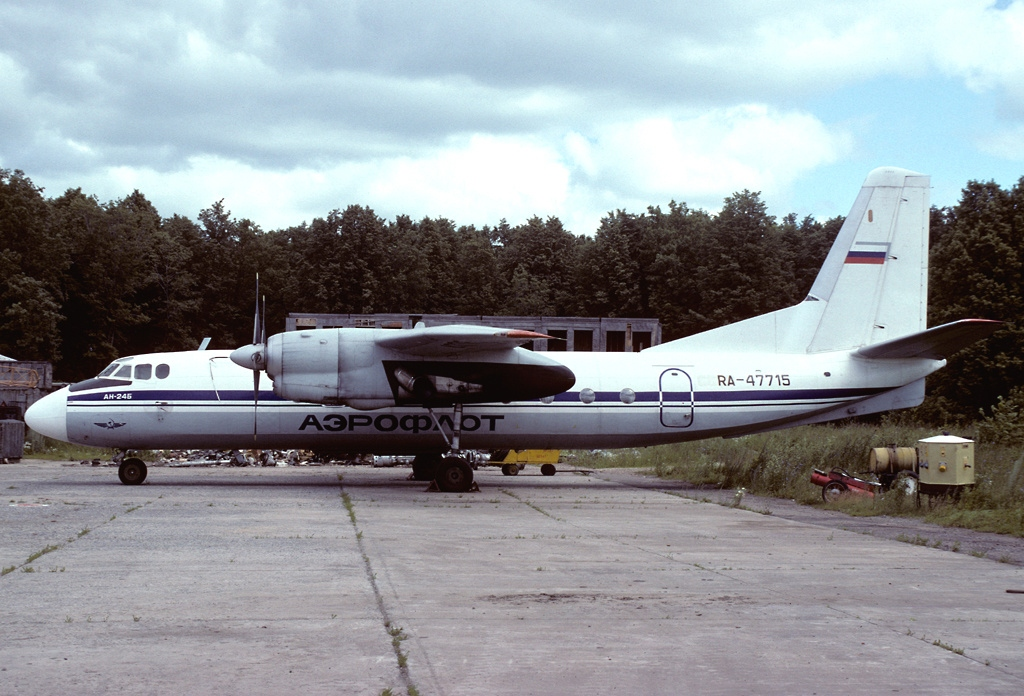
- An Antonov An-24B similar to accident aircraft

Accident
- Date: 30 December 1967
- Summary: Pilot error
- Site: Near Liepāja International Airport, Liepāja, Latvian SSR

Aircraft
- Aircraft type: Antonov An-24
- Operator: Aeroflot
- Registration: CCCP-46215
- Flight origin: Riga International Airport
- Destination: Liepāja International Airport
- Occupants: 51
- Passengers: 46
- Crew: 5
- Fatalities: 43
- Survivors: 8

Aeroflot Flight L-51 was a scheduled domestic passenger flight operated by an Antonov An-24 that crashed on approach to Liepāja International Airport on 30 December 1967, resulting in the death of 43 of the 51 people on board. To date, it is the deadliest aviation accident in Latvian history. The investigation revealed the cause of the accident to be pilot error.

== Accident ==
Flight L-51 was a scheduled passenger flight from Riga to Liepaja. On approach to Liepāja International Airport the airliner entered the glide slope at a speed of 300 km/h and an altitude of 300 meters instead of the recommended 220 km/h at 200 meters. The aircrew elected to use reverse thrust to slow the too fast and high Antonov for landing but then declared a missed approach and attempted to go around. The crew increased the thrust of both engines and retracted the flaps and landing gear. The right engine began delivering forward thrust but the left engine was still in reverse thrust. The aircraft entered a roll to the left with rapidly decreasing altitude and struck the ground at a pitch angle of 0 degrees 250 meters left of the approach path in a snow-covered field. Because the landing gear was retracted the lower fuselage then left propeller contacted the ground before and aircraft gained altitude and became airborne again, the left propeller vibrating severely. The airliner covered 140 meters then struck a telephone pole severing 3 meters of the right wing along with part of its aileron. The aircraft yawed right and continued flying for 1,270 meters with an increasing bank angle to the right until it struck the ground heavily at a bank angle of 48 degrees. There was no fire at the crash scene, but the Antonov was completely destroyed.

== Aircraft ==
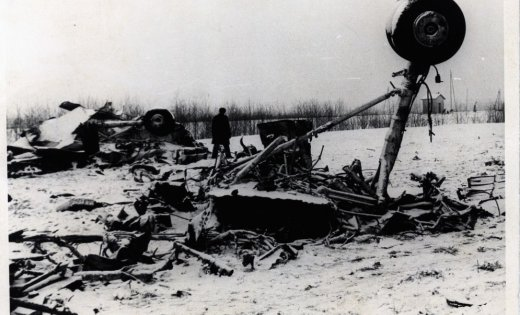
Undercarriage of the wrecked aircraft

The aircraft involved was an Antonov An-24B, serial number 67302909 and registered as CCCP-46215 to Aeroflot. The construction of the airliner was completed on 30 November 1966 and had sustained a total of 1,934 flight hours before the crash.

== Investigation ==
After a detailed examination of the accident, investigators concluded the chain of events leading up to the crash. The flight entered the glide slope with excess speed and was too high. The crew's improper use of reverse thrust in flight and their inability to take the left engine out of beta thrust mode in a timely manner contributed to the accident. The premature retraction of the flaps and landing gear during the go around attempt was also a contributing factor in the crash.

== See also ==
- Aeroflot accidents and incidents
- Aeroflot accidents and incidents in the 1960s
