= List of accidents and incidents involving airliners in Russia =

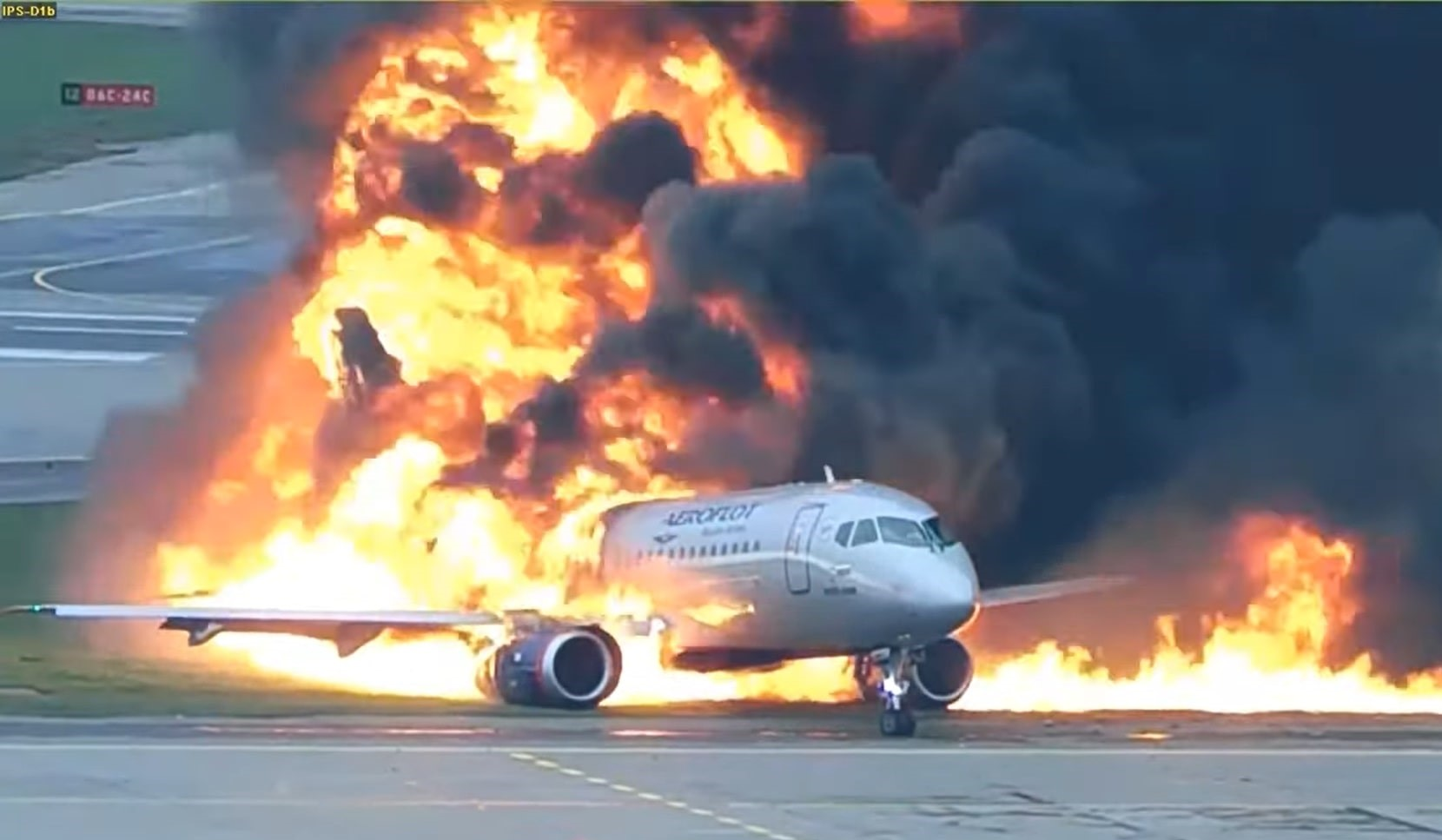
CCTV still of Aeroflot Flight 1492 at Moscow Sheremetyevo Airport in 2019

This list of accidents and incidents involving airliners in Russia summarises airline accidents that occurred within Russia, including the modern Russian Federation, and the Russian SFSR under the Soviet Union.

This list is a subset of the list of accidents and incidents involving airliners by location; it is also available:

- grouped by year as List of accidents and incidents involving commercial aircraft
- grouped by airline
- in alphabetical order

== 1950s ==
- 21 April 1951 – an Aeroflot Antonov An-2 disappeared over the Aradan Ridge with 4 crew on board. It was not found until 2009.
- 17 November 1951 – an Aeroflot Ilyushin Il-12 stalled and crashed from takeoff of Novosibirsk Severny Airport, killing all 23 on board.
- 30 April 1953 – Aeroflot Flight 35, an Ilyushin Il-12 operated by Vnukovo Airlines, ditched into the Volga River following bird strikes. 1 person drowned while awaiting rescue.
- 27 September 1954 – Aeroflot Flight 10, an Il-12, crashed on approach to Severny Airport, killing all 29 on board
- 9 December 1956 – an Aeroflot Lisunov Li-2 crashed near Anadyr, killing all 12 on board.
- 14 June 1957 – LOT Polish Airlines Flight 232, an Ilyushin Il-14, crashed on approach to Vnukovo Airport, killing 9 of the 13 on board.
- 18 December 1957 – Aeroflot Flight 10, an Il-12, suffered a rudder failure and crashed near Birobidzhan, killing all 27 on board.
- 15 August 1958 – Aeroflot Flight 04, a Tupolev Tu-104, stalled and crashed in the Khabarovsky District following an engine flameout. All 64 on board were killed.
- 17 October 1958 – an Aeroflot Tu-104 lost control and crashed near Kanash, killing all 80 on board.
- 23 October 1959 – Aeroflot Flight 200, an Il-14, crashed at Vnukovo Airport, killing 28 of the 29 on board.

== 1960s ==
- 26 September 1960 – Austrian Airlines Flight 901, a Vickers Viscount, smashed to the ground near Trukovo short of the runway on 26 September 1960, killing 31 people.
- 16 March 1961 – Aeroflot Flight 068, a Tupolev Tu-104, crashed during an emergency landing at Koltsovo International Airport following an engine failure, killing 5 on board and 2 on the ground.
- 22 June 1961 – an Aeroflot Il-18 made a forced landing in an oat field near Bogoroditsk following an engine fire. There were no casualties.
- 17 December 1961 – Aeroflot Flight 245, an Il-18, lost control and crashed east of Chebotovka after the pilots accidentally extended the flaps at cruising altitude. All 59 on board were killed.
- 30 June 1962 – Aeroflot Flight 902, a Tu-104, crashed in the Beryozovsky District, killing all 84 on board. Official reports stated the aircraft stalled, but others believed the aircraft was mistakenly shot down.
- 3 September 1962 – Aeroflot Flight 03, a Tu-104, crashed in the Nanaysky District, killing all 86 on board.
- 18 September 1962 – Aeroflot Flight 213, an Il-14, crashed shortly after takeoff from Chersky Airport, killing all 32 on board.
- 4 April 1963 – Aeroflot Flight 25, an Il-18, crashed in Rybnaya Sloboda killing all 67 on board.
- 13 July 1963 – Aeroflot Flight 012, a Tu-134, crashed near Irkutsk, killing 33.
- 21 August 1963 – Aeroflot Flight 366, a Tu-124, ditched in the Neva River following fuel exhaustion. None of the 52 on board were killed.
- 2 September 1964 – Aeroflot Flight 721, an Il-18, crashed on approach to Yuzhno-Sakhalinsk Airport, killing 87.
- 7 March 1965 – Aeroflot Flight 542, a Lisunov Li-2, crashed in the Yermakovsky District following a structural failure in severe turbulence. All 31 on board were killed.
- 8 March 1965 – Aeroflot Flight 513, a Tu-124, stalled and crashed on takeoff from Kuibyshev Airport, killing 30.
- 11 November 1965 – Aeroflot Flight 99, a Tu-124, crashed on approach to Murmansk Airport killing 32.
- 17 February 1966 – Aeroflot Flight 065, a Tu-114, struck plowed snow on takeoff at Sheremetyevo International Airport and crashed, killing 21.
- 14 January 1967 – Aeroflot Flight 5003, an An-12, suffered an in-flight fire and crashed near Tolmachevo Airport, Ob, killing all 6 on board.
- 16 November 1967 – Aeroflot Flight 2230, an Il-18, suffered an engine failure and fire and crashed after takeoff from Koltsovo Airport. All 107 on board were killed.
- 6 January 1968 – Aeroflot Flight 1668, an An-24, crashed shortly after takeoff from Olyokminsk Airport, killing all 45 on board.
- 29 February 1968 – Aeroflot Flight 15, an Il-18, crashed in the Chunsky District, killing 83 of the 84 on board.
- 1 July 1968 – Seaboard World Airlines Flight 253A, a DC-8, unintentionally violated Soviet airspace and was forced to land at the Kuril Islands, where all on board were detained for 2 days.
- 23 June 1969 – the Yukhnov mid-air collision occurred when Aeroflot Flight 831, an Ilyushin Il-14, collided in mid-air with a Soviet Air Force Antonov An-12, killing all 120 on both aircraft.
- 26 August 1969 – an Aeroflot Ilyushin Il-18 made an inadvertent belly landing at Vnukovo Airport. The aircraft caught fire, and 16 were killed.

== 1970s ==
- 1 April 1970 – Aeroflot Flight 1661, an An-24, collided with a weather balloon after departing from Ob Tolmachevo Airport. All 45 on board were killed.
- 22 January 1971 – an Aeroflot Antonov An-12 crashed into the ground short of the runway of Surgut International Airport. All 14 on board died. Icing was blamed.
- 31 January 1971 – an Aeroflot Antonov An-12 carrying one passenger and 6 crew crashed short of the runway of Surgut International Airport. All 7 died. Icing was blamed.
- 25 July 1971 – Aeroflot Flight 1912, a Tu-104, crashed on landing at Irkutsk Airport, killing 97.
- 10 October 1971 – Aeroflot Flight 773, a Tu-104, was destroyed by a bomb above the Naro-Fominsky District, killing all 25 on board.
- 1 December 1971 – Aeroflot Flight 2174, an An-24, lost control and crashed on approach to Saratov Airport, killing all 57 on board.
- 31 August 1972 – Aeroflot Flight 558, an Il-18, suffered an in-flight fire caused by explosives in passenger baggage. All 102 on board were killed.
- 1 October 1972 – Aeroflot Flight 1036, an Il-18, crashed into the Black Sea after departing from Sochi International Airport, killing all 109 people on board.
- 13 October 1972 – Aeroflot Flight 217, an Ilyushin Il-62 crashed outside of Moscow, killing all 174 on board.
- 28 November 1972 – Japan Air Lines Flight 446, a McDonnell Douglas DC-8, stalled and crashed after taking off from Sheremetyevo International Airport. 62 people were killed.
- 21 January 1973 – Aeroflot Flight 6263, an An-24, lost control and crashed in the Bolshesosnovsky District, killing all 39 on board. Signs of a missile strike were found, but no cause was officially determined.
- 3 March 1973 – Balkan Bulgarian Airlines Flight 307, an Il-18, crashed on final approach to Sheremetyevo International Airport due to icing, killing all 25 on board.
- 18 May 1973 – Aeroflot Flight 109, a Tu-104, was hijacked and subsequently bombed above Russia, killing all 81 on board.
- 30 September 1973 – Aeroflot Flight 3932, a Tu-104, crashed approximately five miles from Koltsovo Airport. The pilots suffered spatial disorientation after an instrument failure. All 108 people on board were killed.
- 13 October 1973 – Aeroflot Flight 964, a Tu-104, spun and crashed into a field 16 km north-west of Domodedovo Airport. The pilots suffered spatial disorientation after an instrument failure. All 108 people on board were killed. All 122 people on board were killed.
- 2 November 1973 – Aeroflot Flight 19, a Yak-40, was hijacked and diverted to Vnukovo Airport. The aircraft was stormed and 2 hijackers were killed.
- 16 December 1973 – Aeroflot Flight 2022, a Tu-124, suffered an elevator malfunction and crashed on approach to Moscow, killing all 51 on board.
- 27 April 1974 – an Aeroflot Il-18 suffered an uncontained engine failure and crashed near Pulkovo Airport, killing all 109 on board.
- 3 January 1976 – Aeroflot Flight 2003, a Tu-124, dived and crashed into a house in Moscow, killing 62 people including 1 on the ground.
- 6 March 1976 – Aeroflot Flight 909, an Il-18, lost control and crashed near Voronezh following an electrical failure. All 111 on board were killed as well as 7 on the ground.
- 9 September 1976 – the Anapa mid-air collision occurred when an Aeroflot Antonov An-24 collided in mid-air with an Aeroflot Yakovlev Yak-40 over Anapa, Krasnodar Krai. The impact severed the tail on both planes. Both planes then broke up in mid-air and crashed into the Black Sea, killing all 70 on both aircraft.
- 28 November 1976 – Aeroflot Flight 2415, a Tu-104, crashed near Moscow after an instrument failure lead to spatial disorientation. All 73 on board were killed.
- 15 February 1977 – Aeroflot Flight 5003, an Il-18, stalled and crashed on a go-around at Mineralnye Vody Airport, killing 77.
- 20 April 1978 – Korean Air Lines Flight 902, a Boeing 707, was shot down by Soviet Union Air Defence after the flight violating the Soviet Union airspace. It then crashed and skidded along the frozen Korpijärvi lake, killing 2 passengers out of 109 passengers and crews on board.
- 19 May 1978 – Aeroflot Flight 6709, a Tu-154, crashed near Maksatikha following fuel exhaustion, killing 4.
- 23 May 1978 – an Aeroflot Tupolev Tu-144 on a test flight crash landed in a field near Yegoryevsk following an in-flight fire, killing 2 of the 8 crew on board.
- 7 October 1978 – Aeroflot Flight 1080, a Yakovlev Yak-40, was taking off from Yekaterinburg when all three engines of malfunctioned. While the crew were attempting to turn the aircraft back to the airport, the aircraft crashed into terrain, killing all 38 people on board. Investigators blamed the crew, the ATC worker, the overloaded state of the aircraft, and the weather conditions.
- 17 March 1979 – Aeroflot Flight 1691, a Tupolev Tu-104B, was taking off when a false fire alarm sounded. Unaware that it was false, the pilots attempted to return to Moscow Vnukovo Airport but crashed short of the runway, killing 58 people.

== 1980s ==
- 7 February 1981 – an Aeroflot Tu-104A crashed when the cargo hold suddenly shifted on takeoff from Pushkin Airport. The plane banked to the right and crashed in upside-down condition, killing all 51 people on board. The uneven distribution of the passengers in their seats was also found and concluded as one of its primary factors of the cause of the accident.
- 14 June 1981 – Aeroflot Flight 498, an Ilyushin Il-14, crashed into mountainous terrain near Ust-Barguzin, killing 48 people.
- 24 August 1981 – Aeroflot Flight 811, an Antonov An-24RV, was taking off from Komsomolsk-on-Amur Airport when a Tupovlev Tu-16K collided with the aircraft. 37 were killed, with the only survivor being a passenger on the Antonov.
- 18 September 1981 – the Zheleznogorsk mid-air collision occurred when an Aeroflot Yak-40 collided with an Aeroflot Mil Mi-8 helicopter east of Zheleznogorsk-Ilimsky Airport, killing all 40 on board both aircraft.
- 17 November 1981 – Aeroflot Flight 3603, a Tu-154B-2, was on approach to Norilsk Airport when it descended below the glide slope aggravated with an excessive vertical speed. It then crashed ahead of the runway, killing 99 people.
- 6 July 1982 – Aeroflot Flight 411, an Il-62, stalled crashed on takeoff from Sheremetyevo Airport killing all 90 on board.
- 24 December 1983 – Aeroflot Flight 601, an Antonov An-24RV, banked left excessively and crashed while on approach Leshukonskoye Airport, killing 44 people.
- 11 October 1984 – Aeroflot Flight 3352, a Tu-154, crashed into maintenance vehicles upon landing at Omsk Airport, killing 174 on the aircraft and four more in the vehicles. The air traffic controller had fallen asleep on duty, heavily contributing to the error.
- 23 December 1984 – Aeroflot Flight 3519, a Tupolev Tu-154B-2, suffered an uncontained engine failure. The crews attempted an emergency landing in Krasnoyarsk, but the aircraft banked to the right and crashed. 110 out of the 111 on board were killed.
- 2 July 1986 – Aeroflot Flight 2306, a Tu-134, crashed on a forced landing in the Sysolsky District following an in-flight fire. 54 people were killed.
- 20 October 1986 – Aeroflot Flight 6502, a Tu-134, overran the runway at Kuibyshev Airport, after the pilot attempted to land with curtained cockpit windows. 70 people were killed.
- 8 March 1988 – Aeroflot Flight 3739, a Tu-154, was hijacked and flown to Veshchevo, with the hijackers believing they were landing in Finland. The aircraft was stormed, and 9 were killed including 5 hijackers.

== 1990s ==
- 13 January 1990 – Aeroflot Flight 6246, a Tupolev Tu-134, suffered an in-flight fire and made a forced landing in a glade near Pervouralsk. 27 of the 71 people on board were killed.
- 27 August 1992 – Aeroflot Flight 2808, a Tupolev Tu-134, crashed short of the runway at Ivanovo airport, killing all 84 people on board.
- 26 August 1993 – Sakha Avia Flight 301, a Let L-410, crashed on approach to Aldan Airport, killing all 24 on board.
- 3 January 1994 – Baikal Airlines Flight 130, a Tu-154, crashed near the town of Mamony, Irkutsk after an apparent engine fire, killing all 124 on board and 1 on the ground.
- 24 February 1994 – Pulkovo Aviation Enterprise Flight 9045, an An-24, lost control and crashed on approach to Nalchik Airport due to icing, killing all 13 on board.
- 23 March 1994 – Aeroflot Flight 593, an Airbus A310, crashed into a hillside in Siberia, killing all 75 on board. The autopilot had been disconnected by the captain's son who was sitting in the pilot's seat, which put the plane into a bank that the pilots failed to recover from.
- 26 September 1994 – a Yak-40 of Cheremshanka Airlines crashed near Vanavara after running out of fuel in bad weather, killing 28 passengers and crew.
- 7 December 1995 – Khabarovsk United Air Group Flight 3949, a Tu-154, crashed into the Bo-Dzhausa Mountain, killing all 98 on board.
- 18 March 1997 – Stavropolskaya Aktsionernaya Avia Flight 1023, an An-24, crashed in Cherkessk, killing all 50 on board.

== 2000s ==
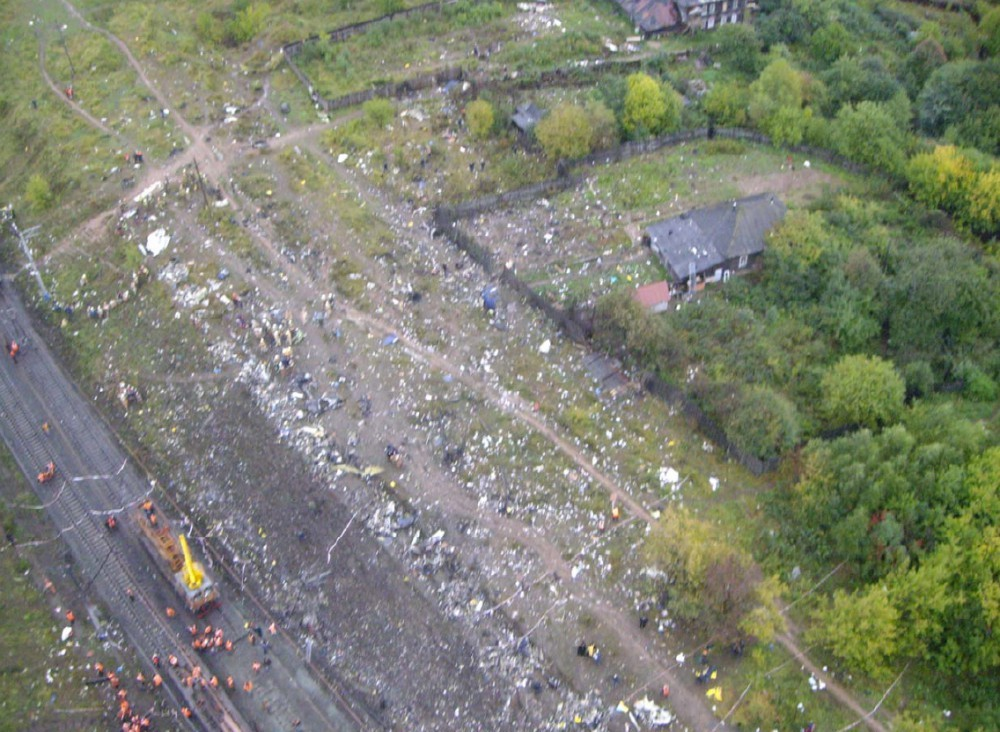
The crash site of Aeroflot Flight 821

- 27 January 2001 – an Antonov An-70 prototype crashed at Omsk Airport, with no deaths.
- 4 July 2001 – Vladivostok Air Flight 352, a Tu-154, stalled and crashed on approach to Irkutsk Airport, killing all 145 on board.
- 14 July 2001 – Rus Flight 9633, an Il-76, crashed after takeoff from Moscow Chkalovsky Airport, killing all 10 on board.
- 19 November 2001 – IRS Aero Flight 9601/02, an Il-18, lost control and crashed near Kalyazin, killing all 27 on board.
- 14 January 2002 – Siberia Airlines Flight 852, a Tu-204, overran the runway at Omsk Airport during an emergency landing. No one was killed.
- 28 July 2002 – Pulkovo Aviation Enterprise Flight 9560, an Il-86, crashed after takeoff from Sheremetyevo International Airport, killing 14 of the 16 on board.
- 24 August 2004 – Siberia Airlines Flight 1047, a Tu-154, and Volga-AviaExpress Flight 1303, a Tu-134, exploded in the sky after suicide bombers detonated bombs in mid-air, killing 90 people on both aircraft.
- 15 March 2005 – Regional Airlines Flight 9288, an Antonov An-24RV, crashed 5 kilometers (3.1 miles) from the runway while on approach to Varandey Airport in Nenetskiy Avtonomnyy Okrug, killing 28 of the 52 people aboard.
- 3 May 2006 – Armavia Flight 967, an Airbus A320, crashed into the Black Sea on a missed approach from Sochi Airport, killing all 113 on board.
- 9 July 2006 – S7 Airlines Flight 778, an Airbus A310, failed to brake on landing at Irkutsk and hit a concrete wall. The plane exploded on impact and burst into flames. 125 people were killed.
- 17 March 2007 – UTAir Flight 471, a Tupovlev Tu-134, suffered a catastrophic structural failure after a hard landing in Samara. The aircraft broke apart and flipped over, killing 6 people.
- 29 July 2007 – ATRAN Flight 9655, an An-12, lost control and crashed following bird strikes on departure from Moscow Domodedovo Airport. All 7 crew members were killed.
- 26 May 2008 – Moskovia Airlines Flight 9675, an An-12, suffered an in-flight fire and crashed while attempting to return to Kurchatov Chelyabinsk International Airport. All 9 crew members on board were killed.
- 14 September 2008 – Aeroflot Flight 821, a Boeing 737-500 operated by Aeroflot Nord, crashed on approach to Perm Airport en route from Moscow. All 88 people on board were killed.

== 2010s ==
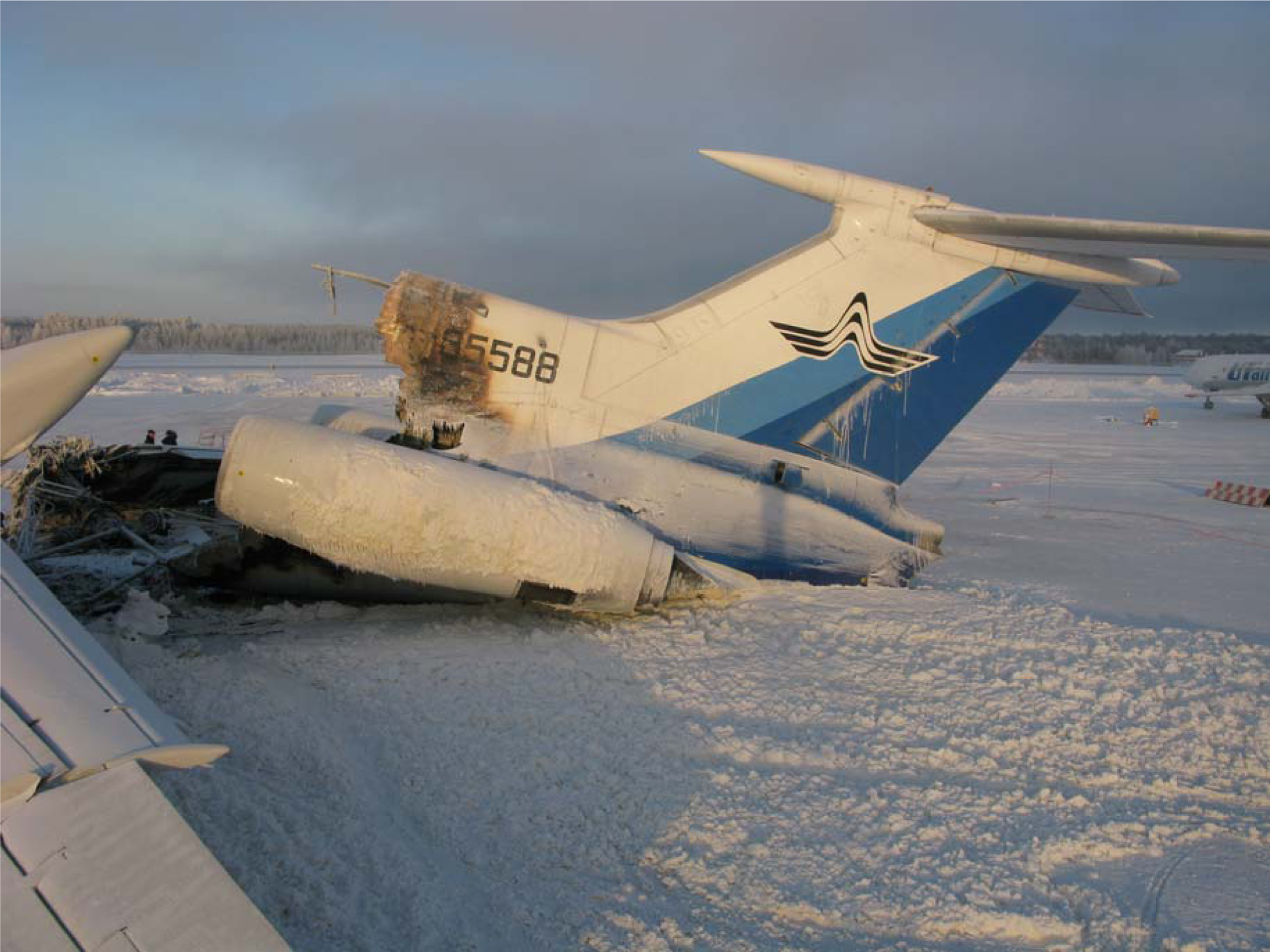
Burnt wreckage of Kolavia Flight 348

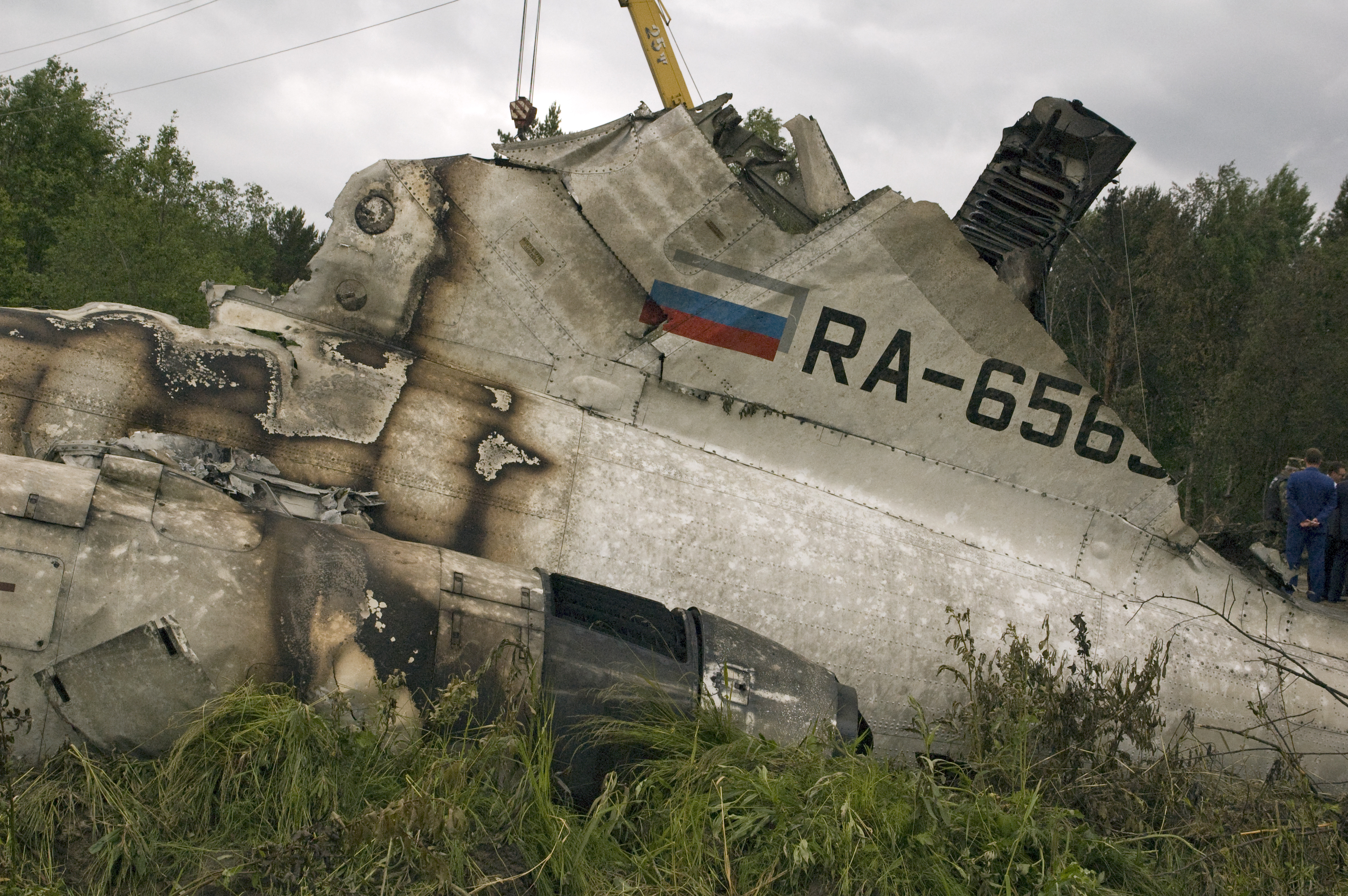
Tail of RusAir Flight 9605

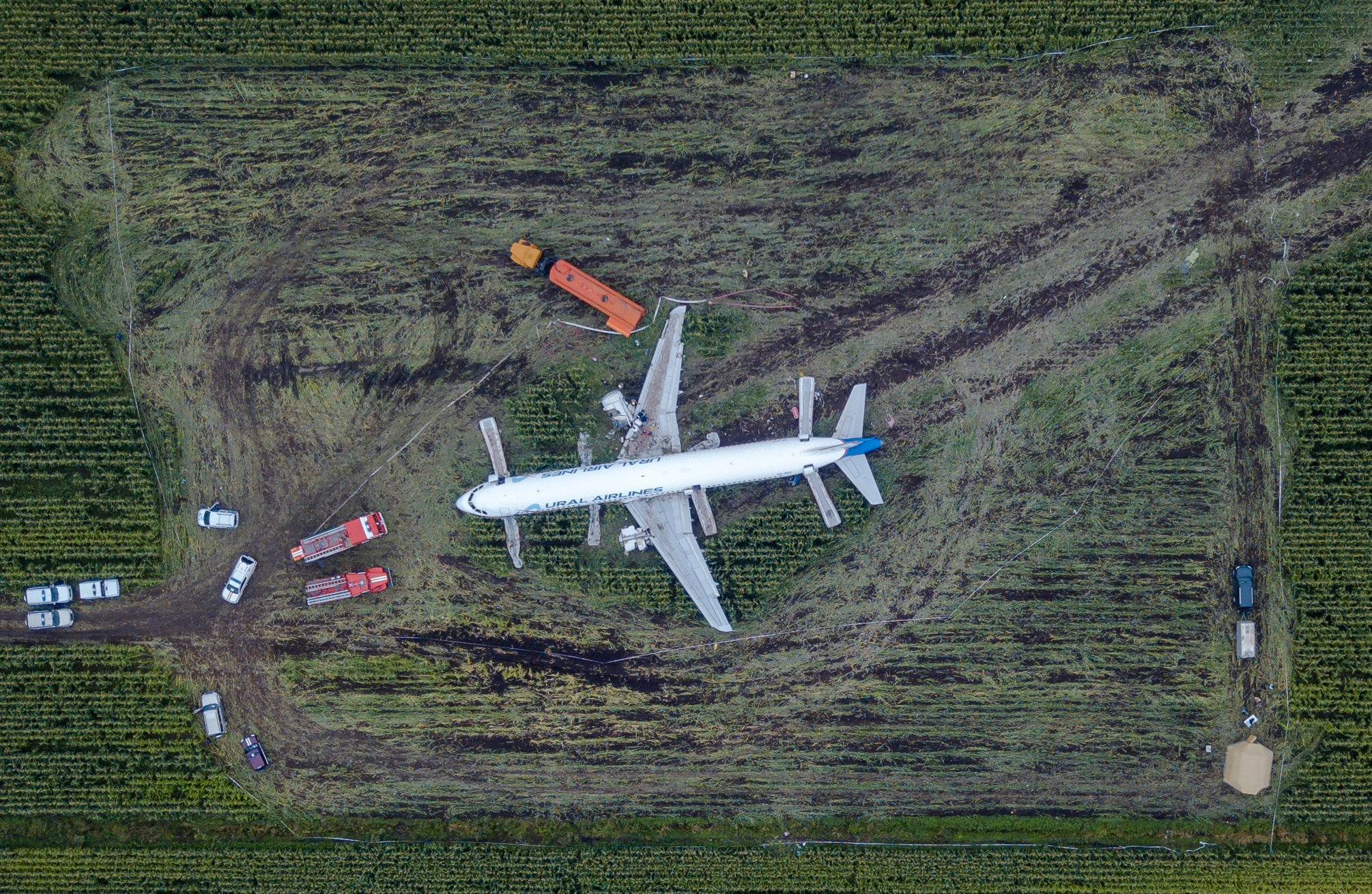
Ural Airlines Flight 178

- 22 March 2010 – Aviastar-TU Flight 1906, a Tu-204, crashed on a ferry flight on approach to Moscow Domodedovo Airport. None of the 8 crew were killed.
- 3 August 2010 – Katekavia Flight 9357, an Antonov An-24, veered to the right from its landing course, crossed a river, impacted trees, crashed and burst into flames, killing 12 people. Russian investigators concluded that pilot error was the cause of the accident.
- 7 September 2010 – Alrosa Flight 514, a Tu-154, overran the runway on an emergency landing at Izhma Airport, following a total electrical failure. No one was killed.
- 4 December 2010 – Dagestan Airlines Flight 372, a Tu-154, ran off the runway during an emergency landing at Moscow Domodedovo Airport, following fuel starvation. 2 people were killed.
- 1 January 2011 – Kolavia Flight 348, a Tu-154, was taxiing for take-off at Surgut, when an electrical fire started. Evacuation was immediately ordered by the captain. 43 people were injured, and 3 people were killed.
- 20 June 2011 – RusAir Flight 9605, a Tupolev Tu-134A-3, was on approach to Petrozavodsk when it went upside down and crashed into houses, killing 47 people including FIFA football referee Vladimir Pettay. Pilot error was the cause of the accident.
- 11 July 2011 – Angara Airlines Flight 9007, an Antonov An-24, suffered an engine fire, forcing the pilots to ditch into the Ob River. Seven of the 37 people on board were killed. The aircraft was written off.
- 9 August 2011 – Avis-Amur Flight 9209, an An-12, lost control and crashed near Omsukchan following an in-flight fire. All 11 on board were killed.
- 7 September 2011 – a Yak-Service Yakovlev Yak-42 overran the runway, hit a mast and crashed into the Volga riverbank. 44 of the 45 on board were killed, including the entire Lokomotiv Yaroslavl hockey team, who had chartered the flight.
- 2 April 2012 – UTAir Flight 120, an ATR 72, suffered atmospheric icing and stalled. The plane impacted terrain and burst into flames, killing 33.
- 12 September 2012 – Petropavlovsk-Kamchatsky Air Flight 251, an An-28, crashed while attempting to land at Palana Airport in Russia after descended below minima on approach, killing 10 people. Pilot error was the cause of the accident.
- 29 December 2012 – Red Wings Airlines Flight 9268, a Tu-204, failed to stop after landing at Vnukovo Airport and left the runway at high-speed, the aircraft hit the runway and broke up on impact killing five of the eight on board. Dashcam video shown the moment the aircraft hit and debris littered the runway.
- 2 July 2013 – Polar Airlines Flight 9949, a Mil Mi-8 helicopter, crashed in Deputatsky, killing 24 of the 28 on board.
- 17 November 2013 – Tatarstan Airlines Flight 363, a Boeing 737-500, suddenly nose dived and crashed on a go-around at Kazan Airport, killing all 50 on board.
- 26 December 2013 – an Antonov An-12 of Irkut-Avia crashed on approach to Irkutsk Airport, killing all 9 on board.
- 20 October 2014 – Unijet Flight 074P, a Dassault Falcon 50, collided with a snow plough on takeoff at Vnukovo International Airport. All 4 on board were killed, including CEO of TotalEnergies Christophe de Margerie.
- 19 March 2016 – Flydubai Flight 981, a Boeing 737-800, lost control and crashed on a go-around at Rostov-on-Don Airport. All 55 passengers and seven crew on board were killed.
- 21 October 2016 – Skol Airlines Flight 9375, a Mil Mi-8, crashed at Yamalo-Nenets, killing 19 of the 22 on board.
- 15 November 2017 – Khabarovsk Airlines Flight 463, a Let L-410, crashed on approach to Nelkan Airport. 6 people were killed, with a three-year-old girl being the only survivor.
- 11 February 2018 – Saratov Airlines Flight 703, an Antonov An-148, crashed on climbout from Moscow in icing conditions. All 71 on board were killed.
- 1 September 2018 – UTair Flight 579, a Boeing 737-800, overran the runway at Sochi International Airport. No one on board was killed, but an airport employee died of a heart attack during the emergency response.
- 5 May 2019 – Aeroflot Flight 1492, a Sukhoi Superjet 100, caught fire during an emergency landing at Moscow's Sheremetyevo Airport, killing 41 and injuring 11.
- 27 June 2019 – Angara Airlines Flight 200, an An-24, ran off the runway while returning to Nizhneangarsk Airport after suffering an engine failure. The aircraft collided with a building, killing 2 people.
- 15 August 2019 – Ural Airlines Flight 178, an Airbus A321, crashed into a corn field following a bird strike. No one on board was killed.

== 2020s ==
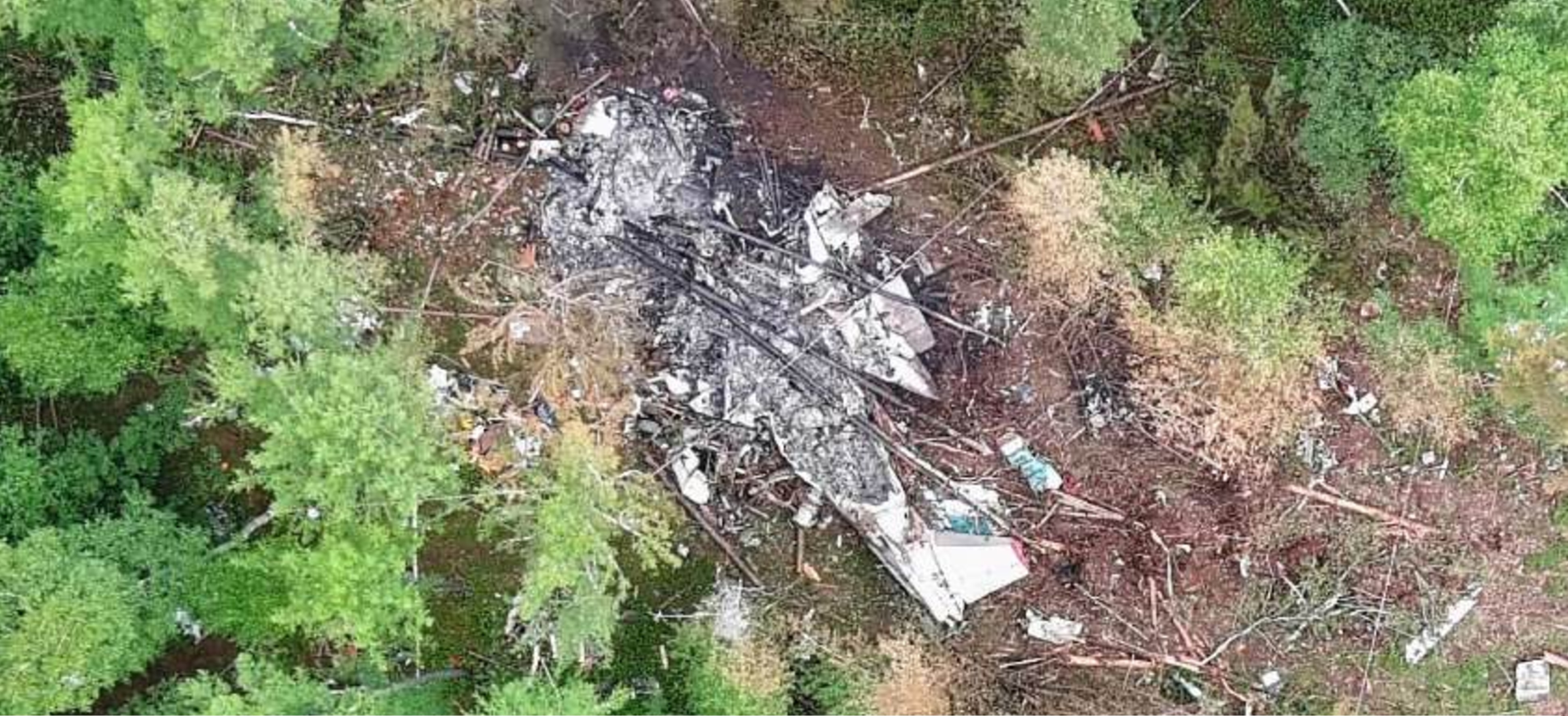
Angara Airlines Flight 2311

- 13 November 2020 – Volga-Dnepr Airlines Flight 4066, an Antonov An-124, suffered an uncontained engine failure on takeoff from Novosibirsk Tolmachevo Airport, and overran the runway upon returning. None of the 14 occupants were killed.
- 6 July 2021 – Petropavlovsk-Kamchatsky Air Flight 251, an An-26, crashed on approach to Palana Airport, killing all 28 on board.
- 16 July 2021 – Siberian Light Aviation Flight 42, an An-28, made a forced landing in the Vasyugan Swamp following an engine failure. No one was killed.
- 12 September 2021 – Siberian Light Aviation Flight 51, a Let L-410 operated by Aeroservis, crashed on approach to Kazachinskoye Airport, killing 4 of the 16 on board.
- 3 November 2021 – Grodno Aviakompania Flight 1252, an An-12, crashed on a go-around at Irkutsk Airport, killing all 9 occupants.
- 12 September 2023 – Ural Airlines Flight 1383, an Airbus A320, made a forced landing in a wheat field in Kamenka. No one was injured.
- 12 July 2024 – Gazpromavia Flight 9608, a Sukhoi Superjet 100, as it climbed through 3000 feet the aircraft lost height and impacted ground in a forest near Kolomna. All three crew died.
- 24 July 2025 – Angara Airlines Flight 2311, an An-24, crashed into a forest near Tynda, killing all 48 on board.

== See also ==
- List of accidents and incidents involving airliners by location
- Aeroflot accidents and incidents
