= Aeroflot Flight 5003 =

Aeroflot Flight 5003 may refer to two aviation accidents:

- Aeroflot Flight 5003 (1967), involving an Antonov 12B
- Aeroflot Flight 5003 (1977), involving an Ilyushin Il-18
