= Flight 232 =

Flight 232 may refer to:

Listed chronologically

- LOT Polish Airlines Flight 232, crashed on 14 June 1957
- Ansett Airlines Flight 232, crashed on 15 November 1972
- SAETA Flight 232, crashed on 15 August 1976
- United Airlines Flight 232, crashed on 19 July 1989
  - Crash Landing: The Rescue of Flight 232, a television film about this incident
