= Flight 25 =

Flight 25 may refer to:

- Aerocon Flight 25, crashed on 3 November 2013
- Aeroflot Flight 25, crashed on 4 April 1963
