= Flight 15 =

Flight 15 or Flight 015 may refer to:

- Aeroflot Flight 15, crashed on 29 February 1968
- Korean Air Lines Flight 015, crashed on 19 November 1980
