= USCM =

USCM may refer to:

- United States Conference of Mayors
- Magnitogorsk International Airport
- United States Colonial Marines, a fictional military unit in the film Aliens
