= Aeroflot Flight 5003 (1967) =

1967 aviation accident in Russia

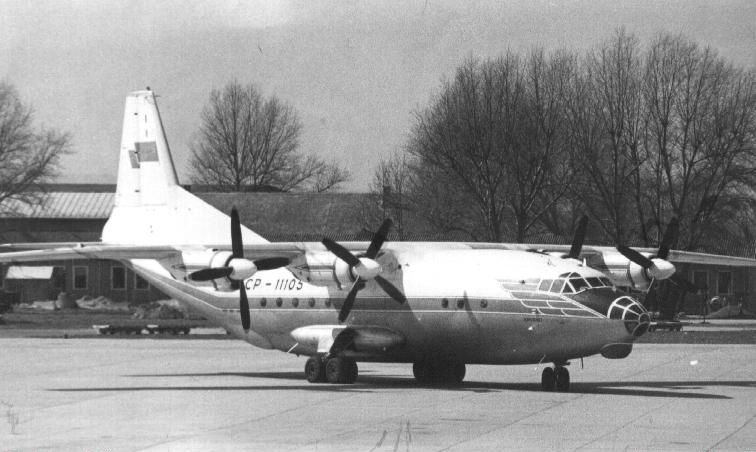
- An Aeroflot An-12B in 1972, similar to the one involved in the accident.

Accident
- Date: 14 January 1967
- Summary: In-flight fire for reasons unknown
- Site: Near Tolmachevo Airport

Aircraft
- Aircraft type: Antonov An-12B
- Operator: Polar Aviation Management(under Aeroflot)
- Registration: CCCP-04343
- Flight origin: Tolmachevo Airport, Novosibirsk
- Destination: Krasnoyarsk Airport, Krasnoyarsk
- Occupants: 6
- Crew: 6
- Fatalities: 6
- Survivors: 0

Aeroflot Flight 5003 was a Soviet domestic cargo flight that crashed during climb out on 14 January 1967. The Antonov An-12B was flying between Novosibirsk and Krasnoyarsk in Russia with a crew of six when it crashed. It was carrying industrial parts from Moscow to Khabarovsk with several intermediate stops in between, however it caught fire shortly after takeoff, resulting in a fatal accident. At the time Flight 5003 was being operated by Polar Aviation Management under Aeroflot.

== Aircraft and crew ==
CCCP-04343, an Antonov An-12B, entered operational service with Aeroflot in 1959. It was flying under Aeroflot's Directorate of Polar Aviation with a six-member crew. The pilots were Robert Fritsevich Bernovsky and Viktor Andrekov, with Vladimir Izmailov Prokopevich serving as the flight's radio operator. CCCP-04343 had 4376 hours on its airframe and was fitted with four Ivchenko AI-20 turboprop engines.

== Synopsis ==
Flight 5003 took off from Moscow-Sheremetyevo International Airport on 13 January 1967 and proceeded eastwards with the final destination of Khabarovsk. It made its first stop in Sverdlovsk and then flew on to Novosibirsk. With a cargo of prefabricated industrial material (bearings, parts, belts, tools, plastics, enamels, etc.), Flight 5003 took off from Novosibirsk runway 07 at 06:33 KRAT on 14 January 1967, and began to make its way to Irkutsk for the third stop of the journey. Weather conditions at the time were poor with just four kilometers of visibility accompanied by snow, haze, and low cloud cover.

Air traffic controllers promptly lost communications with Flight 5003. The aircraft had reached an altitude of just two hundred meters and was in the air for less than two minutes when an in-flight fire forced the pilots to attempt an emergency landing on a snow-covered field. Witnesses on the ground recalled seeing the aircraft in flames and trailing smoke. In a left bank, the aircraft's left wing struck the ground first, resulting in an explosion that completely destroyed the plane and killed all six members of the crew. The wreckage was found seven kilometers away from the airfield.

== Cause ==
Investigators determined the cause of the crash to be the in-flight fire coupled with the harsh conditions which made an emergency landing difficult. The bodies of Flight 5003's crew were severely burned and the wreckage was so heavily damaged that determining the exact cause of the fire was not possible, though investigators believe it was the result of flammable cargo material, not the aircraft's fuel system. In addition, investigators found the pilots failed to switch on the aircraft's firefighting system.

== See also ==
- Aeroflot Flight 5003 (1977)
- Aeroflot Flight 558
- Valujet Flight 592
- UPS Airlines Flight 6
