= Aeroflot Flight 19 =

1973 airliner hijacking in the Soviet Union

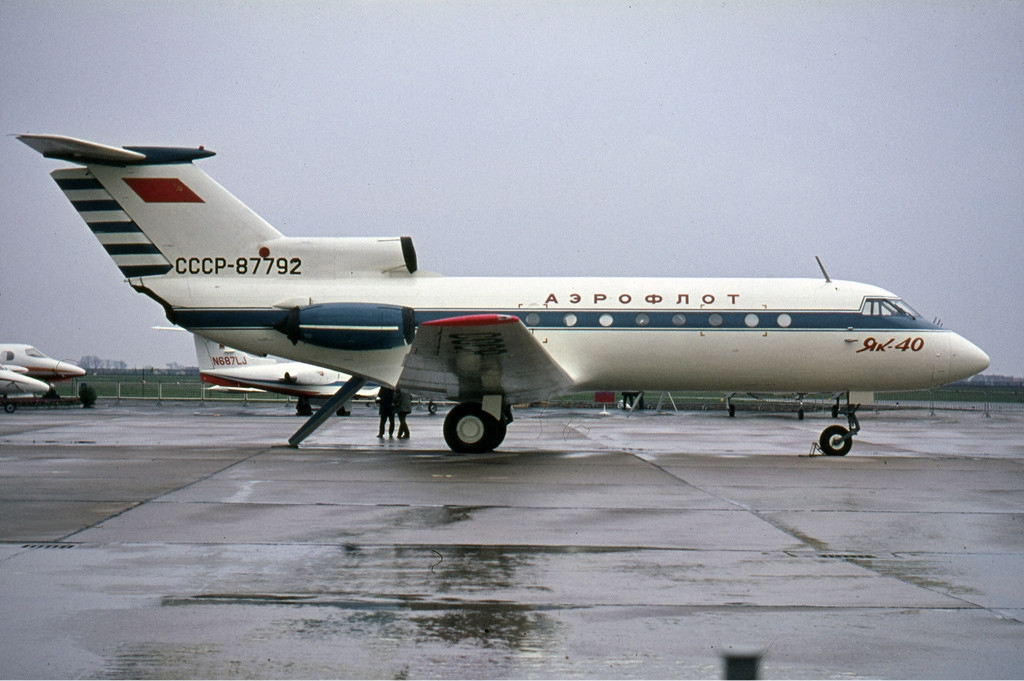
- a Yakovlev Yak-40 similar to the one involved in the hijacking

Hijacking
- Date: 2 November 1973
- Summary: Hijacking
- Site: Vnukovo Airport, Moscow, RSFSR, USSR; 55.5946°N 37.2742°E

Aircraft
- Aircraft type: Yakovlev Yak-40
- Operator: Aeroflot
- Call sign: AEROFLOT 19
- Registration: CCCP-87607
- Flight origin: Bykovo Airport, Moscow
- Destination: Bryansk Airport, Bryansk
- Occupants: 31
- Passengers: 28 (including 2 hijackers)
- Crew: 3
- Fatalities: 2 (hijackers)
- Injuries: 4
- Survivors: 29 (including 2 hijackers)

Aeroflot Flight 19 was a scheduled passenger flight from Bykovo Airport, Moscow, Soviet Union, to Bryansk Airport, Bryansk, Soviet Union. On 2 November 1973, the Yakovlev Yak-40 flying this route was hijacked by four people ten minutes before landing. The aircraft was then diverted to Moscow's Vnukovo Airport, where the hijackers demanded a buyout and provision of a flight to Sweden. The hostages inside the aircraft were subsequently liberated after the authorities stormed the aeroplane. This incident became one of the first well-known cases of storming a hijacked aircraft in USSR aviation.

== Aircraft and crew ==
=== Aircraft ===
The aircraft was a Yak-40 constructed by Saratov Aviation Plant in July 1971 and delivered to the Ministry of Civil Aviation. It was registered as CCCP-87607 and sent to the Civil Aviation Administration of the Central Districts, tentatively to the Bryansk Aeroflot division.

=== Crew ===
Captain Ivan Kashin (36), was one of the first pilots to learn to fly the Yak-40. He graduated the Sasovo Civil Aviation School in 1957. First officer on the flight was Stanislav Talpekin, flight engineer – Nikolai Nikitin.

== Description ==
=== Departure ===
The aircraft was operating a routine domestic flight F-19 (Ф-19) from Bykovo Airport, Moscow, to Bryansk Airport. Yak-40 departed Moscow at 10:45 local time with 28 passengers and 3 crew members on board. The estimated flight time to Bryansk on that day was 50 minutes.

=== Hijacking ===
Ten minutes prior to landing at Bryansk Airport, four male hijackers (Viktor Romanov, Vladimir Zhalnin, Pyotr Bondarev, and Aleksandr Nikiforov) retrieved guns out of the overhead luggage bins and took passengers as hostages, then attempted to storm the cockpit. The noises from the passenger cabin reached the cockpit. Captain Kashin asked his flight engineer to investigate the situation in the cabin, and after Nikitin realised that there were hijackers on board, he immediately shouted the information to the flight crew and shut the door from the outside. The flight engineer tried to disarm one of the hijackers (Romanov), however, he was injured by Zhalnin. One of the passengers (Vladimir Gaponenko) also attempted to disarm Bondarev, but he lost his balance from the aircraft pitching, and as a result got injured.

In the flight deck Kashin sent a distress signal to air traffic control. Meanwhile, the attackers managed to break the lock on the cockpit door and entered the flight deck. Hijackers demanded that the flight crew head back to Moscow. Whilst on approach to Vnukovo Airport, the intruders forced the crew to inform the authorities that they demanded payment of US$1.5 million for all hostages and for information about future aircraft hijacker groups. Despite difficult weather conditions in Moscow, the crew managed successfully to land the Yak-40 at Vnukovo.

=== On the ground ===
KGB Chairman (and future leader of the USSR) Yuri Andropov and the Minister of Internal Affairs Nikolai Shchelokov soon arrived at the airport and began developing a strategy to free the hostages.

Hijackers let two injured hostages (Nikitin and Gaponenko) out of the plane. Then, the hijackers put forward extra conditions: the authorities must let them refuel the aircraft and give them half of the buyout (or ransom) in return for half of the hostages. The intruders plan was to fly to Leningrad, where they would let the rest of the hostages out and refuel the Yak-40, enough for them to fly to Sweden. Nevertheless, it was decided to not let the captured aeroplane out of Moscow, and instead storm the aircraft. A storming group of volunteer policemen (Mikhail Lyakhmanov, Vladimir Rakov, Aleksandr Mushkarin, Nikolai Kapustin and Aleksandr Popryadukhin) was put together by the authorities. This group secretly sneaked towards the plane and hid under it next to the front landing gear. After several hours of waiting the intruders were informed that the authorities were ready to transfer the money. At first, a suitcase full of fake banknotes was supposed to be carried by a KGB officer, but at the last minute he refused to do it, so a transport police officer carried it instead.

After hijackers heard movements under the Yakovlev Yak-40, they assumed that the buyout was finally delivered. One of the hijackers (Nikiforov) opened the door, then sergeant Rakov pressed a pike pole against the door. Hijacker Zhalnin began shooting at the police officers, who retaliated. As a result, Nikiforov fell onto the airfield, sustaining serious injuries (from which he later died in hospital). At the same time, an armoured personnel carrier approached the aircraft and fired a line from the machine gun aiming at the plane, which suffered around 90 bullet hits. Tear gas was then used; however, the smoke bomb got stuck between the seats, which caused the upholstery to burn. As the smoke flocked the cabin, panic arose amongst the passengers, who started to escape the aircraft. Hijackers Bondarev and Zhalnin escaped the plane together with the passengers, whilst Romanov shot himself. As a result of storming the aircraft two passengers were injured, but none died.

== Aftermath ==
=== Hijackers fate ===
The two remaining hijackers were subsequently arrested. Zhalnin, who was 16 years old at the time, was sentenced to 10 years in prison. After being released he soon died. Pyotr Bondarev was declared insane with the help of his parents and was sent to a psychiatric hospital, where he spent 6 months. He died in Moscow in 2006.

=== Commendation of crew ===
On 19 December 1973 at a ceremony in Moscow, police officer Aleksandr Popryadukhin and captain Ivan Kashin were awarded the title Hero of the Soviet Union for courage.

=== Fate of aircraft ===
The Yak-40 was soon repaired and resumed operations. In 1987 it was transferred to the Ministry of General Machine Building and sent to TsNIIMash. The aircraft is now scrapped.

=== Safety considerations ===
After the hijacking of Flight 19, screening of passengers in airports in the Soviet Union was significantly improved and tightened. New departments were created to tackle terrorism in the country.

== See also ==
- Aeroflot Flight 109 – the deadliest aviation terror attack in the Soviet Union
- Aeroflot Flight 244 – first successful hijacking in the USSR
- Aeroflot Flight 3739 (1988) – one of the most notorious hijackings in Soviet history
- Terrorism in Russia
