= Aviastar-TU Flight 1906 =

2010 aviation accident

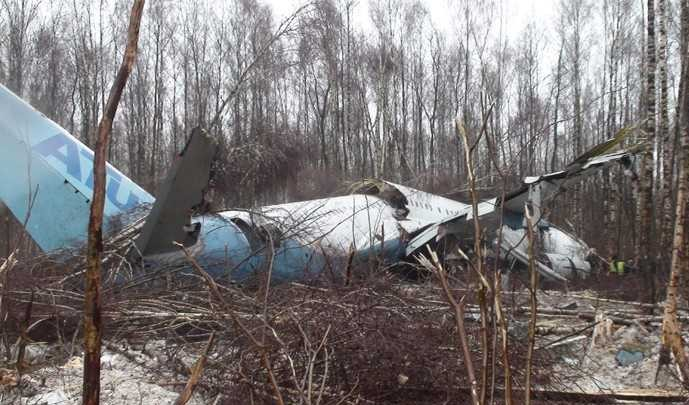
- Wreckage of aircraft after impact

Accident
- Date: 22 March 2010
- Summary: Controlled flight into terrain
- Site: Aviagorodok, near Moscow Domodedovo Airport, Moscow, Russia; 55°25′51.6″N 37°51′24.4″E

Aircraft
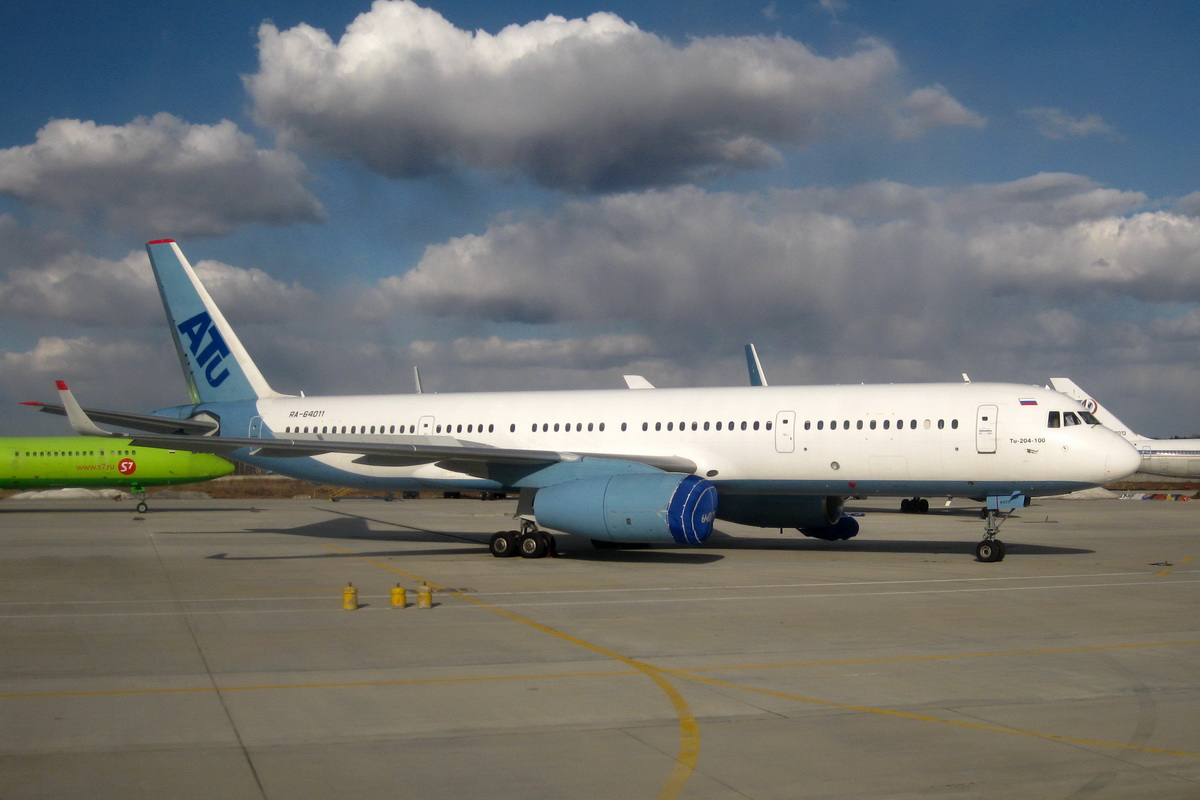
- RA-64011, the aircraft involved in the accident
- Aircraft type: Tupolev Tu-204-100
- Operator: Aviastar-TU
- IATA flight No.: 4B1906
- ICAO flight No.: TUP1906
- Call sign: TUPOLEVAIR 1906
- Registration: RA-64011
- Flight origin: Hurghada International Airport, Hurghada, Egypt
- Destination: Moscow Domodedovo Airport, Moscow, Russia
- Occupants: 8
- Crew: 8
- Fatalities: 0
- Injuries: 8
- Survivors: 8

Aviastar-TU Flight 1906 was a Tupolev Tu-204 that crashed while attempting to land at Domodedovo International Airport, Moscow, Russia, in heavy fog on 22 March 2010. The aircraft was on a ferry flight from Hurghada International Airport, Egypt to Moscow, and had no passengers on board; all eight crew survived the accident, four with serious injuries requiring hospitalization and four with minor injuries. The accident was the first hull loss of a Tu-204 and the first hull loss for Aviastar-TU.

Investigators determined the cause of the accident to be failure of the autopilot system and poor cockpit crew performance.

== Accident ==
Aviastar-TU Airlines Flight 1906 was a ferry flight with only eight crew on board the aircraft. At 02:34 local time (23:34 on 21 March UTC), the plane crash-landed about 1,450 metres (1.45 km; 0.90 mi) short of runway 14R at Domodedovo airport while attempting to land at night in fog and poor visibility. The METAR for the airport at the time indicated wind direction 160° at 3 metres per second (5.8 kn; 11 km/h; 6.7 mph) and visibility 100 metres (330 ft).

When the aircraft was on final, the pilots received several warnings from ATC that they were 1,000–2,000 metres (1.0–2.0 km; 0.62–1.24 mi) to the left of the landing course, followed by another warning that they were too low. The pilots were confused about their location and were trying to figure it out based on reports from ATC, the flight computer and a portable GPS device. According to the final investigation report, they also ignored automatic altitude readouts that started at 60 metres (200 ft) above ground level and continued every 10 metres (33 ft). Nine seconds before the impact, the pilot contacted ATC to ask if they were off course, still concentrated on aligning the aircraft with the runway and not on its altitude. The pilots made no effort to stop the descent.

The aircraft crash-landed in a birch forest at 23:35 local time, its left wing broke off, and the hull broke into two. There was no fire. Fire services arrived 30 minutes later. All crew members except the flight engineer who was seriously injured, escaped the crashed plane on their own. They could not immediately explain the reason of the crash, saying that it happened too fast. One of the crew members (purser) reached the nearby highway and stopped a car which took her to a hospital. Three other crew members also reached the highway and waited there for an ambulance.

The two pilots suffered serious fractures and concussions; two others were taken to hospital where they were described as being in a satisfactory condition. The four remaining crew members were treated for minor injuries in Domodedovo's medical center. The accident resulted in the first hull loss of a Tupolev Tu-204 and the first hull loss for Aviastar-TU.

== Aircraft ==
The accident aircraft was Tupolev Tu-204-100, msn 1450741364011, registration RA-64011. The aircraft first flew as RA-64011 on 25 March 1993. On 3 September 1993 it entered service with Vnukovo Airlines. In January 2001, it was sold to Sibir Airlines.

Before the crash, the aircraft was involved in two accidents. On 14 January 2002, the aircraft operating as Siberia Airlines Flight 852 was flying from Frankfurt to Novosibirsk when it had to be diverted to Omsk due to poor weather at the destination. On approach, pilots reported fuel supply problems, followed by a flameout of both engines. The aircraft glided and landed on the runway, overran the runway and collided with the lights after the runway threshold. There were no injuries. The aircraft was repaired and continued service. From August 2006 the aircraft was leased to various Russian airlines – Red Wings Airlines, Aviastar-TU, Interavia Airlines and then Aviastar-TU again.

On 21 March 2010, one day before the crash, the aircraft was flying from Moscow to Hurghada with 210 passengers on board when it had to return to Moscow due to smoke in the cockpit. The accident was caused by a faulty heater in the cockpit, which was promptly repaired.

== Investigation ==
Despite the adverse weather, Russian federal air transport service Rosaviatsia says the aircraft conducted a normal approach and "the crew did not report any failures, malfunctions, or the intention to make an emergency landing." Russia's top investigator said on 22 March that the emergency landing may have been caused by an infringement of safety rules. The method the crew used to navigate the aircraft is a particular avenue of the investigation into the accident.

Rosaviatsia says the flight recorders have been recovered and sent to the Interstate Aviation Committee (Russian: Межгосударственный авиационный комитет (МАК)) for analysis. Pending investigation, the airline – Aviastar-TU – was banned from carrying passengers with immediate effect, and its operations were investigated. Preliminary analysis of flight data has shown that the aircraft was not damaged in the air by any fire or explosion, and both engines operated until the impact. According to the chief of the Russia's Federal Air Transport Agency Alexander Neradko the "human factor" is the likely reason behind the crash.

On 30 March 2010, it was reported that the aircraft had 9 tonnes of fuel on board at the time of the crash. On approach to Domodedovo, the autopilot system failed as the aircraft descended through 4,200 metres (13,800 ft). The crew then flew the aircraft manually, and did not communicate the failure of the autoflight system to Air Traffic Control.

Two months before the crash, the captain was disciplined for a minor violation (accidentally operating spoilers in flight during approach with flaps down).

== Final investigation report ==
On 7 September 2010, the МАК released their final report into the accident. Some of their findings are:

- There were no damage sustained to the aircraft in flight;
- The aircraft had 9 tons of fuel on board and both engines were operating until the impact;
- During the early stage of the descent, the two flight computers produced conflicting data that had to be corrected manually. This caused a furious response from the captain.
- During the approach, at 5,400 metres (17,700 ft), the course mode of the autopilot disconnected due to radio altimeter failure, and the pilots did not notify ATC about this. They repeatedly tried to switch it back on, with "increasing nervousness" and cursing. When crossing 4,200 metres (13,800 ft), the flight control computer failed too.
- The pilot expected that the instrument landing system was not available because of the failures, and stated to the crew: "So, pay attention, I'm going to have a hard time, so get together and watch everything". He did not abort landing. This phrase was also noted by the investigators as an example of poor CRM.
- The pilot repeatedly stated to the ATC that he was certified to land with vertical visibility of 30 m (98 ft), whereas in fact he was only certified to land with vertical visibility of 60 m (200 ft). During the approach, the vertical visibility ranged from 50 to 60 m (160 to 200 ft).
- The pilot also misinformed ATC that he was executing an ILS approach, while in fact he was not. The ILS was likely operational, but the ILS frequency was not set because the pilots assumed it was not operational. When the ILS indicator is not in use, its needle is in the middle, same as when the aircraft is exactly following the glideslope. Therefore, the report suggests that the pilot may have believed that he was on the glideslope, even though he was significantly below it.
- A holder for a portable GPS device was found in the cockpit, but the device itself was not found. The investigation report, based on CVR recordings, states that the pilots may have relied on the portable GPS device to understand their location.
- The report suggests that during the final minutes of the flight, all three pilots were focused on correcting the horizontal deviation from the landing course and did not pay attention to the altitude.

=== Cause ===
The report states the following reason of the crash:

The cause of the incident with Tu-204-100 registered RA-64011 during the approach for landing in weather conditions that did not meet the minima permitted for this aircraft type and with fully operational equipment was failure to make a go-around decision and continued descent despite no visual contact with the ground, which has caused an impact with trees and ground in a controlled flight into terrain.

The report listed the following contributing factors:

- Insufficient training for landing in adverse weather conditions;
- Unsatisfactory CRM;
- Autopilot failure;
- Failure to divert to another airport;
- Failure to go around;
- Unsatisfactory communication between crew members.

== Criminal case ==
In March 2011, both pilots (Aleksandr Kosyakov and Aleksey Mikhailovsky) were sentenced to one-year suspended prison term.
