= Magnitogorsk International Airport =

Airport in Bashkortostan, Russia

Magnitogorsk International Airport Магнитогорск Халыҡ-Ара Аэропорты

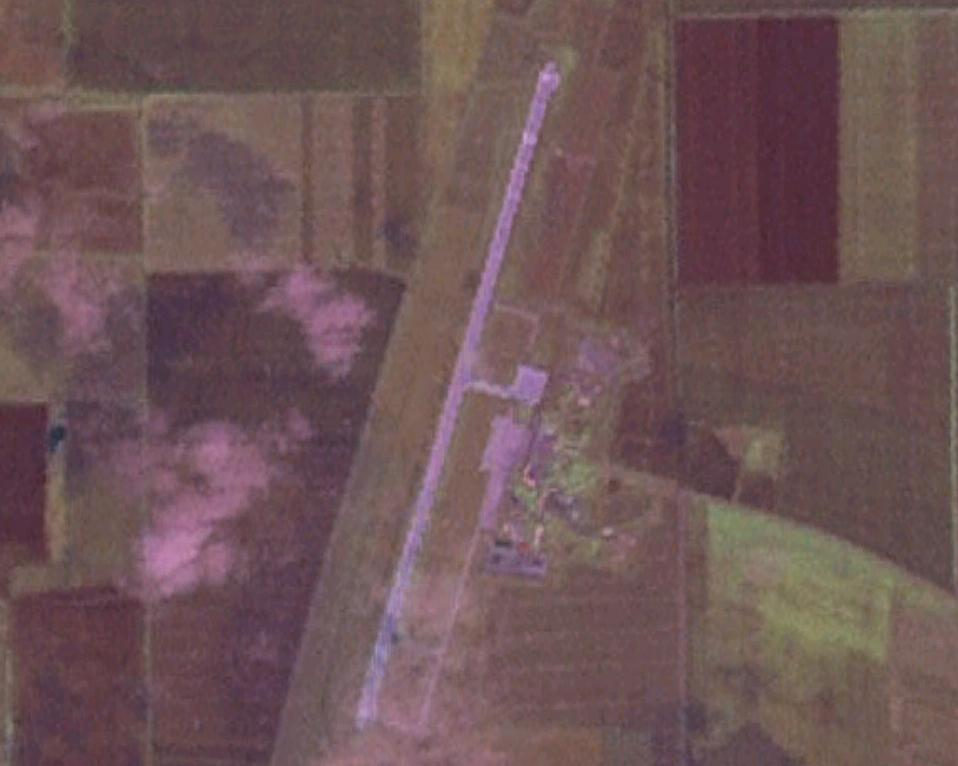
- IATA: MQF; ICAO: USCM

Summary
- Airport type: Public
- Operator: FSUE "Magnitogorsk Air Enterprise"
- Serves: Magnitogorsk
- Location: Magnitogorsk, Russia
- Elevation AMSL: 436 m (1,430 ft)
- Coordinates: 53°23′36″N 58°45′24″E
- Website: airmgn.ru/

Map
- Airport in Chelyabinsk region

Runways
Direction	Length		Surface
Direction	m	ft	Surface
01/19	3,250	10,663	Concrete
- Source: DAFIF

Magnitogorsk International Airport (Bashkir: Магнитогорск Халыҡ-Ара Аэропорты, Russian: Международный аэропорт Магнитогорск) (IATA: MQF, ICAO: USCM) (also given as Magnitogorsk West) is an airport in Bashkortostan, Russia, located 19 km west of Magnitogorsk, Chelyabinsk Oblast. It serves medium-sized airliners. In 2017, 193,175 passengers passed through the Magnitogorsk airport.

== Airlines and destinations ==
Airlines	Destinations
Aeroflot	Moscow–Sheremetyevo
azimuth	Mineralnye Vody, Moscow-Vnukovo
Ikar	Saint Petersburg
Nordwind Airlines	Saint Petersburg
UVT Aero	Kazan

== Accidents and incidents ==
- On 31 August 1972, an Ilyushin Il-18 operating Aeroflot Flight 558 crashed after failing to land due to an onboard fire.

== See also ==
- List of airports in Russia
