= Siberia Airlines Flight 852 =

Aircraft accident in 2002

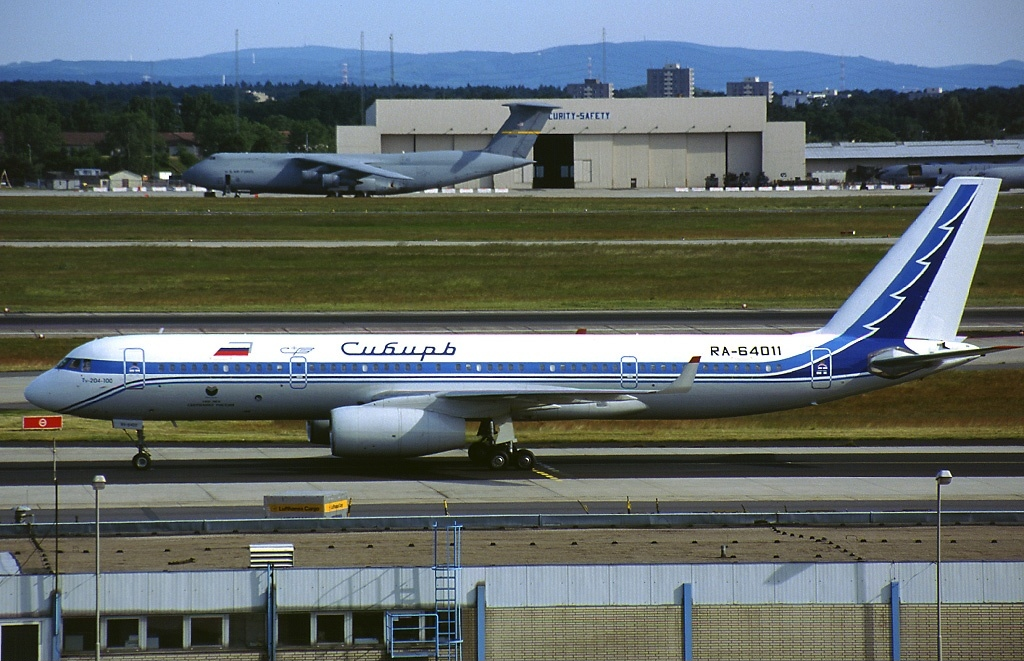
- RA-64011, the aircraft involved in the accident, seen in June 2002 after being repaired

Accident
- Date: January 14, 2002
- Summary: Runway excursion during emergency landing
- Site: Omsk Tsentralny Airport, Omsk, Russia

Aircraft
- Aircraft type: Tupolev Tu-204-100
- Operator: Siberia Airlines
- Registration: RA-64011
- Flight origin: Frankfurt Airport, Frankfurt, Germany
- Destination: Tolmachevo Airport, Novosibirsk, Russia
- Passengers: 117
- Crew: 22
- Fatalities: 0
- Survivors: 139 (all)

On 14 January 2002, Siberia Airlines Flight 852 suffered a dual engine flameout and made an emergency landing in Omsk, Russia. The aircraft overran the runway and was substantially damaged, but there were no injuries.

== Accident ==
The aircraft, flying from Frankfurt to Novosibirsk, was prohibited from landing at Tolmachevo Airport. The only accessible alternate airfield that had customs and permission to fly the Tu-204 was Omsk. The flight to Omsk took place in a strong headwind. When approaching Omsk, the aircraft ran out of fuel and both engines flamed out. The crew managed to land the aircraft on the runway and braking was performed manually as the thrust reversers failed to deploy. The aircraft overshot the runway and struck several lights in the process. There were no injuries. The aircraft was substantially damaged, but was repaired and returned to service. That same aircraft would later crash while attempting to land at Domodedovo International Airport, Moscow, Russia, in heavy fog on 22 March 2010 operating as Aviastar-TU Flight 1906.

== See also ==
- Gimli Glider
- Air Transat Flight 236
- Aeroflot Flight 366
- Aviastar-TU Flight 1906
