= Aeroflot Flight 1912 =

1971 aviation accident in the Soviet Union

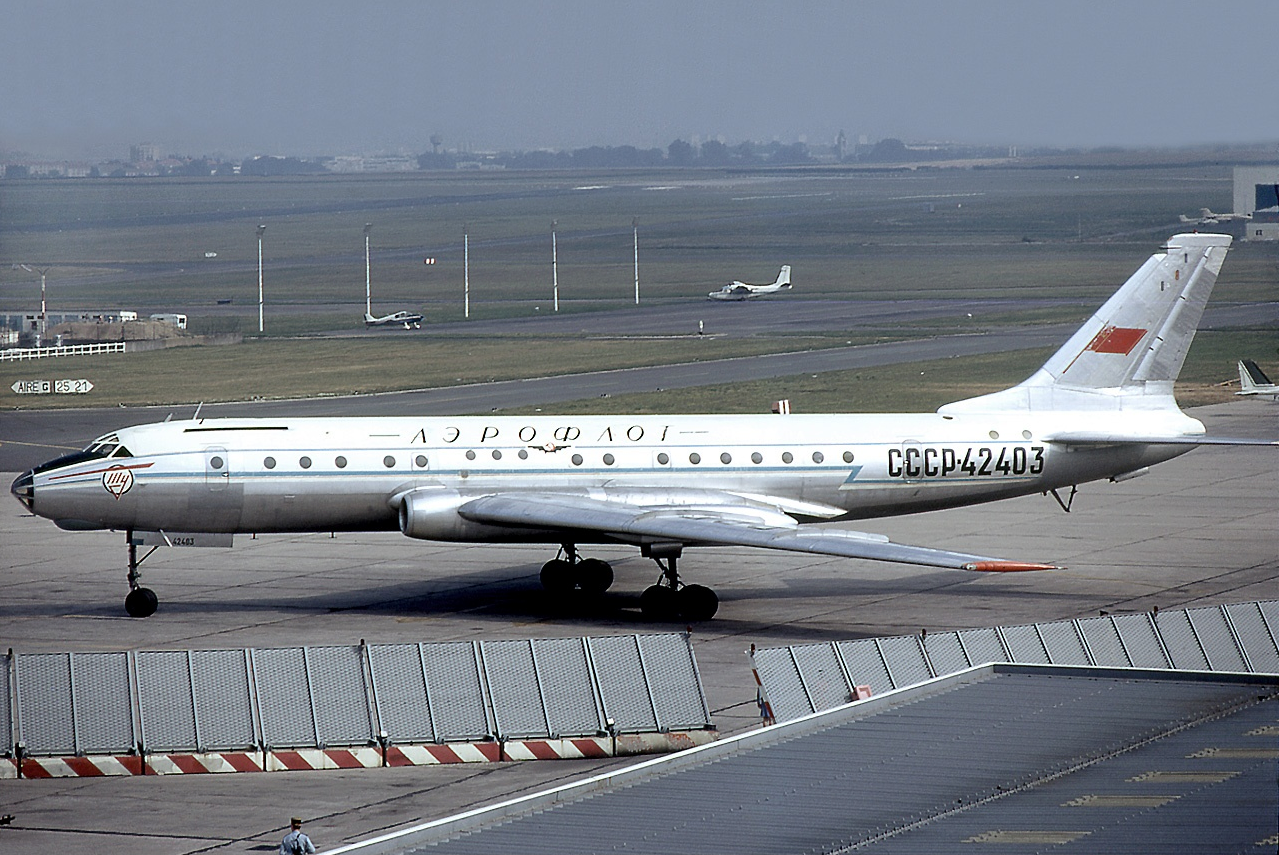
- An Aeroflot Tupolev Tu-104B, similar to the one involved in the accident

Accident
- Date: 25 July 1971
- Summary: Instrument failure and mechanical errors followed by hard landing
- Site: Irkutsk Airport; 52°16′10″N 104°22′55″E

Aircraft
- Aircraft type: Tupolev Tu-104B
- Operator: Aeroflot
- Registration: CCCP-42405
- Flight origin: Odesa International Airport
- 1st stopover: Kiev (Kyiv)
- 2nd stopover: Chelyabinsk Airport
- 3rd stopover: Tolmachevo Airport
- 4th stopover: Irkutsk Airport
- Last stopover: Khabarovsk Novy Airport
- Destination: Knevichi Airport, Vladivostok
- Occupants: 126
- Passengers: 118
- Crew: 8
- Fatalities: 97
- Survivors: 29

Aeroflot Flight 1912 was a scheduled domestic Aeroflot passenger flight on the Odessa-Kiev (Kyiv)-Chelyabinsk-Novosibirsk-Irkutsk-Khabarovsk-Vladivostok route that crashed on 25 July 1971, making a hard landing at Irkutsk Airport. It touched down 150 metres (490 ft) short of the runway, breaking the left wing and catching fire. Of the 126 people on board the aircraft, 29 survived.

== Aircraft ==
The aircraft involved in the accident was a Tupolev Tu-104B, registered CCCP-42405 to the West Siberia Civil Aviation Directorate, a division of Aeroflot. At the time of the accident, the aircraft operated 19,489 flight hours and sustained 9,929 pressurization cycles.

== Crew ==
The crew of the fatal flight took over in Novosibirsk. A total of eight crew members were aboard the flight, of which five were from the cockpit crew.

The cockpit crew consisted of:

- A. V. Ovchinnikov serving as pilot in command
- A. A. Pinchuk serving as co-pilot
- G.P. Guslyakov serving as flight engineer
- I. V. Shchepkin serving as navigator
- V. I. Bolotin serving as radio operator

Flight attendants G. K. Eselevich, L. B. Shokina and A. N. Sorokin served as the cabin crew.

== Synopsis ==
The Odessa-Kyiv-Chelyabinsk-Novosibirsk part of the route was carried out by a different aircraft and crew; the passengers and luggage switching to CCCP-42405 during the stopover in Novosibirsk at Tolmachevo Airport. At 04:34 local time (01:34 Moscow time) this fresh aircraft and crew departed Novosibirsk for Irkutsk. After takeoff the flight maintained an altitude of 10,000 metres (33,000 ft).

In Irkutsk, the sky was completely covered with stratus clouds with a ceiling of 150 metres (490 ft), mild north-easterly winds were present, and visibility was at 1,500 metres (4,900 ft). The crew was instructed to proceed on the final approach on a bearing of 116°. At 08:10 local time (03:10 Moscow time) the air traffic controller gave flight 1912 permission to begin descent. At 08:29:35 the crew received a landing instructions and permission to descend to an altitude of 400 metres (1,300 ft). The flight crew responded that they heard the information and would begin approach with the ILS. In response, the air traffic controller reported weather conditions to the flight. At 08:31:52 the flight was on approach 17 kilometres (11 mi; 9.2 nmi) from the runway. At first, the aircraft stayed on the correct trajectory; but when the aircraft was eight kilometres (5.0 mi; 4.3 nmi) from the runway, the air traffic controller warned the flight that it was straying to the left. At 08:33:45 local time, when the flight was just seven kilometres (4.3 mi; 3.8 nmi) from the runway, the air traffic controller warned that they were close to missing the glide slope. In response, the flight crew notified the controller that the landing gear had been released and they were ready to land.

At 08:33:58 received permission to land; the crew confirmed they received the information. At 08:34:18 the crew reported they were near the non-directional beacon. The controller again warned the flight of the slight deviation to the left. The recommended instrument approach speed for the Tu-104 is 300 km/h (160 kn; 190 mph), but it is very likely that the aircraft's instruments overstated the speed, causing the misinformed crew to try to reduce speed. In reality, the aircraft's speed was around 270–275 km/h (146–148 kn; 168–171 mph), causing a left bank and a lateral deviation of 30 metres (98 ft). At 08:34:47 the aircraft passed the non-directional beacon at an altitude of 85 metres (279 ft).

Due to flying 25–30 km/h (13–16 kn; 16–19 mph) less than the recommended speed, the aircraft reached a critical angle of attack. At 08:35:00 with a vertical speed of approximately 8–10 m/s (26–33 ft/s), the Tu-104 hit the right landing gear on the runway 154 metres (505 ft) from the base of the runway; milliseconds later the left landing gear, then the front gear, stuck the runway. Shortly thereafter the left wing of the plane broke, fuel leaking from the broken left tanks ignited. The plane skidded on the runway, causing the fuselage to break into pieces. The wreckage of the plane was strewn over an area of 500 metres (1,600 ft; 550 yd). 97 people perished in the crash; the captain, the co-pilot, the flight engineer, a flight attendant, as well as 73 adult passengers and 20 children. 36 of the deaths were from carbon monoxide poisoning.

== Causes ==
The flight was on an approach speed far below the recommended parameters. The instruments most likely gave inaccurate readings, causing the crew to reduce speed before touching the runway led to a hard landing. Examination of the airspeed indicators showed that the indicators themselves were functional, but flight tests showed that changes in cabin pressure affected the pressure in the full-pressure pipeline of the speed indicator used by the co-pilot and the navigator; resulting in an overstatement of the speed ranging from 17 to 80 km/h (9.2 to 43.2 kn; 11 to 50 mph). While simulating the flight to determine the cause of the erroneous indications, the depressurization happened approximately three minutes after turning off the cabin pressurization. The probability of such events occurring during descent was supposed to be 0.000001%.

The investigation cited the three primary causes of the accident as follows:

The lack of objective airspeed reading available to the crew on approach due to mechanical errors upon depressurization of the cabin when reaching a low altitude.

Flying at too slow a speed at a dangerous rate of climb, 25–35 km/h (13–19 kn; 16–22 mph) below the recommended parameters, which, with insufficient forward speed, led to the impossibility of performing a normal leveling and a rough blow to the runway surface, exceeding the design load and destroying the aircraft.

The erroneous actions by the crew were flying at too slow a speed while landing in difficult conditions with not enough time or altitude to solve the issue.

== See also ==
- Aeroflot Flight 964, also a Tupolev Tu-104, crashed on approach experiencing similar artificial horizon failure.
- Aeroflot Flight 2415, instrument failure of Tu-104 causing crash shortly after takeoff.
- Aeroflot Flight 3932, another Tupolev Tu-104, crashed shortly after takeoff experiencing similar artificial horizon failure.
