= Bryansk International Airport =

Airport in Russia

Bryansk International Airport Международный аэропорт "Брянск"

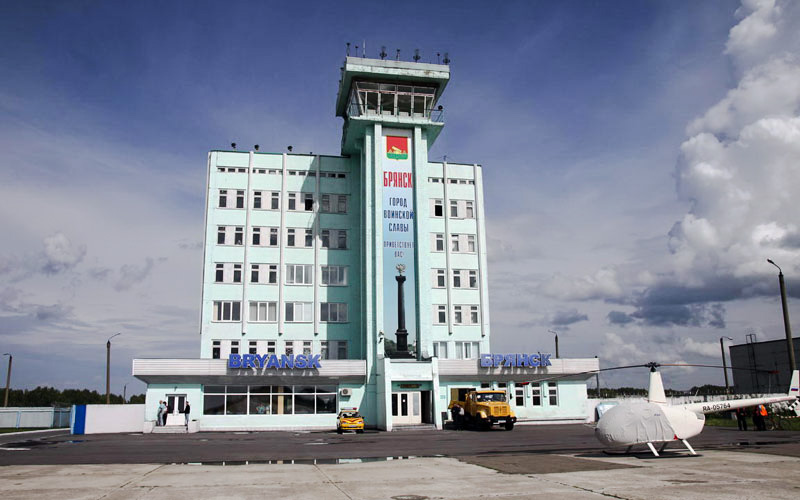
- IATA: BZK; ICAO: UUBP

Summary
- Airport type: Public
- Operator: Government
- Serves: Bryansk, Bryansk Oblast, Russia
- Elevation AMSL: 663 ft / 202 m
- Coordinates: 53°12′51″N 34°10′35″E
- Website: bzk.aero

Map
- Location of airport in Bryansk Oblast

Runways
Direction	Length		Surface
Direction	m	ft	Surface
16/34	2,400	7,874	Concrete

Bryansk International Airport (Russian: Международный аэропорт "Брянск") (IATA: BZK, ICAO: UUBP) is an airport in Bryansk Oblast in western Russia. It is located 14 kilometres (8.7 mi) from the city of Bryansk, along the international R-22 highway connecting Moscow and Kyiv. A military airfield was first built at the site in 1927 and it became a civil airport for refuelling in 1934 and an official airport in 1961. In September 1995 it became an international airport.

== Facilities ==
The airport resides at an elevation of 663 feet (202 m) above mean sea level. It has one runway designated 17/35 with a concrete surface measuring 2,400 by 42 metres (7,874 ft × 138 ft).

== Airlines and destinations ==
Airlines	Destinations
Azimuth	Krasnodar, Saint Petersburg, Sochi
RusLine	Kazan, Mineralnye Vody, Moscow–Vnukovo

== See also ==
- List of airports in Russia
