= Aeroflot Flight 3932 =

1973 plane crash in the Soviet Union

Coordinates: 56°42′41″N 60°38′41″E

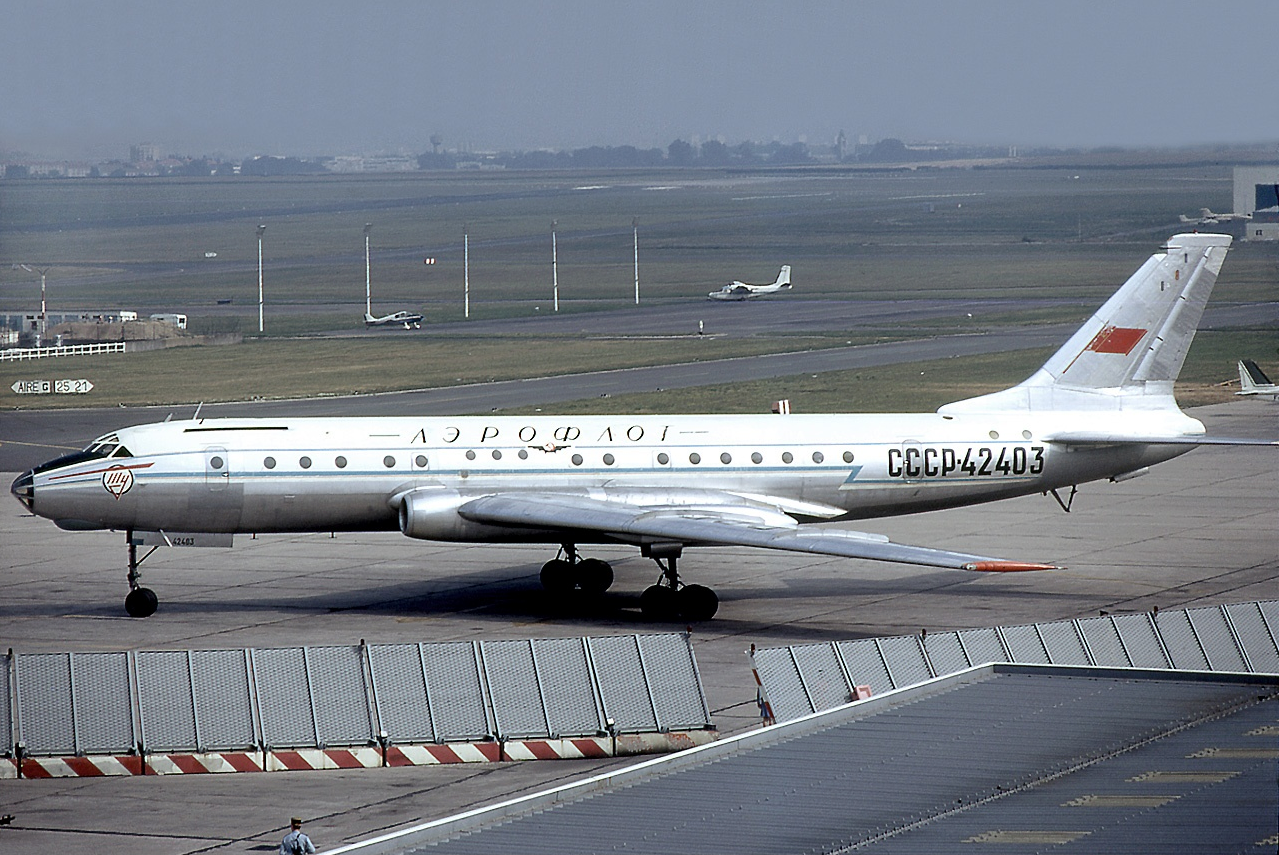
- An Aeroflot Tupolev Tu-104B similar to the aircraft involved

Accident
- Date: 30 September 1973
- Summary: Electrical failure, spatial disorientation
- Site: 10 km southwest of Koltsovo Airport

Aircraft
- Aircraft type: Tupolev Tu-104
- Operator: Aeroflot
- Registration: CCCP-42506
- Flight origin: Koltsovo Airport, Sverdlovsk, Russian SFSR
- 1st stopover: Omsk Tsentralny Airport, Russian SFSR
- 2nd stopover: Tolmachevo Airport, Novosibirsk, Russian SFSR
- 3rd stopover: Kadala Airport, Chita, Russian SFSR
- Last stopover: Khabarovsk Novy Airport, Russian SFSR
- Destination: Knevichi Airport, Vladivostok, Russian SFSR
- Occupants: 108
- Passengers: 100
- Crew: 8
- Fatalities: 108
- Survivors: 0

Aeroflot Flight 3932 was a flight operated by Aeroflot from Sverdlovsk-Koltsovo to Omsk Tsentralny Airport. On 30 September 1973, the Tupolev Tu-104 operating the route crashed shortly after takeoff from Sverdlovsk, killing all 108 passengers and crew on board.

== Aircraft ==
The aircraft involved in the accident was a Tupolev Tu-104B with two Mikulin AM-3M-500 engines, registered CCCP-42506, originally to the Uzbekistan division of the state airline, Aeroflot. At the time of the accident, the aircraft sustained had 20,582 flight hours and 9412 pressurization cycles. The aircraft had 100 passenger seats, hence it was at full capacity when it crashed.

== Crew ==
Eight crew members were aboard Flight 3932. The cockpit crew consisted of:

- Captain Boris Stepanovich Putintsev
- Copilot Vladimir Andreevich Shirokov
- Navigator Pyotr Gavrilivich Kanin
- Flight engineer Ivan Yakovlevich Raponov

== Accident ==
Weather conditions at Sverdlovsk (now known as Yekaterinburg) were reported to be mild; visibility was over 6 kilometers, and light northwest winds.

Flight 3932 was on the Sverdlovsk-Vladivostok route with stopovers at Omsk, Novosibirsk (Tolmachevo), Chita (Kadala), and Khabarovsk airports. The flight crashed shortly after takeoff on the Sverdlovsk-Omsk part of the route.

The flight took off from Sverdlovsk - Koltsovo Airport at 18:33 MSK (Moscow time) and at 18:34:21 headed on a bearing of 256° for the route to Omsk. As a routine procedure, air traffic control instructed the crew to make a left turn and climb to an altitude of 1,500 metres (4,900 ft) after takeoff; the crew responded that they would report when they reached the altitude.

At 18:35:25 MSK, 5–6 seconds after setting the engines to standard power, with an altitude of 350–400 metres (1,150–1,310 ft) and a speed of 480 km/h (260 kn; 300 mph) the crew began the left turn while in the clouds, with a bank angle between 35-40°. At 20:37 local time (18:37 Moscow time), when the flight was at an altitude of 1,200 metres (3,900 ft), the bank angle reached 75-80°, after which the crew completely lost control of the aircraft. The plane crashed into a nearby forest at a speed of 270 km/h (150 kn; 170 mph).

== Cause ==
The aircraft crashed due to incorrect indications by the main artificial horizon and the compass system, caused by a failure of the electrical supply, resulting in spatial disorientation of the pilots. The aircraft crashed approximately five miles from Koltsovo Airport.

== See also ==
- Aeroflot Flight 964, also a Tupolev Tu-104, which crashed just two weeks after Flight 3932 experiencing similar electrical failures.
- Aeroflot Flight 1912, another Tupolev Tu-104, crashed after a hard landing caused by similar mechanical failures.
- Aeroflot Flight 2415, another Tupolev Tu-104, crashed after takeoff experiencing similar equipment failure.
