= Aeroflot Flight 964 =

October 1973 Tupolev Tu-104 crash in Moscow

Coordinates: 55°29′51″N 37°39′50″E

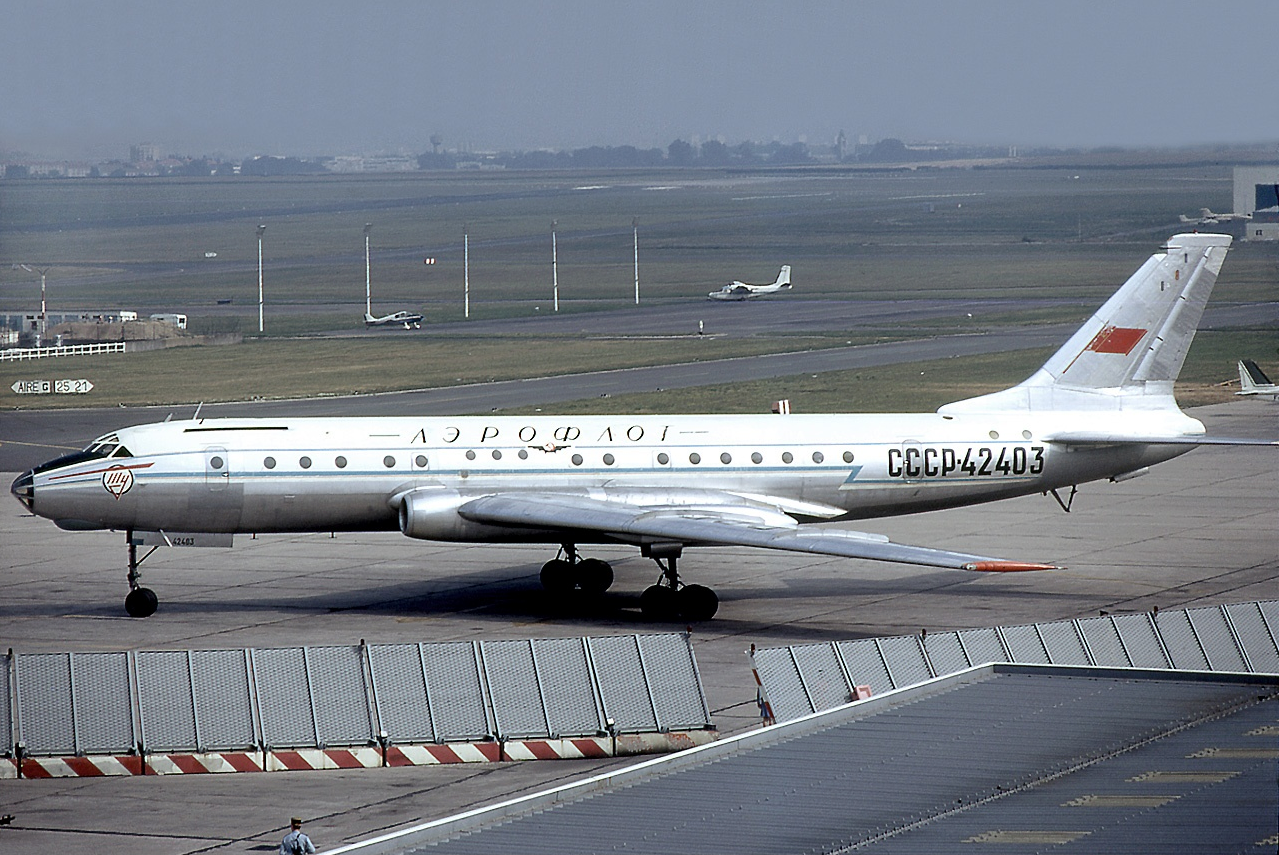
- An Aeroflot Tupolev Tu-104B similar to the aircraft involved

Accident
- Date: 13 October 1973
- Summary: Spatial disorientation after electrical failure
- Site: 16 km north-west of Domodedovo Airport

Aircraft
- Aircraft type: Tupolev Tu-104
- Operator: Aeroflot
- Registration: CCCP-42486
- Flight origin: Kutaisi Airport, Georgia
- Destination: Domodedovo Airport, Moscow, Russia
- Occupants: 122
- Passengers: 114
- Crew: 8
- Fatalities: 122
- Survivors: 0

Aeroflot Flight 964 was a flight operated by Aeroflot from Kutaisi Airport, Georgia to Domodedovo Airport, Moscow, Russian SFSR. On 13 October 1973, the Tupolev Tu-104 operating on the route crashed during its approach to Moscow, killing all 122 passengers and crew on board. It remains the deadliest accident involving a Tupolev Tu-104.

== Aircraft ==
The aircraft involved in the accident was a Tupolev Tu-104B, registered CCCP-42486 to the Georgia division of Aeroflot. Originally the aircraft cabin had 100 seats, but it was later reconfigured for 115 seats. At the time of the accident, the aircraft had 16,250 flight hours and sustained 9,776 pressurization cycles.

== Crew ==
Eight crew members were aboard the flight. The cockpit crew consisted of:

- Captain Georgy Iraklievich Kurtsidze
- Co-pilot Karmen Semenovich Ratiani
- Navigator Boris Grigorievich Yegoyan
- Flight Engineer Devi Alexandrovich Zakariadze
- Radio operator Gurami Georgievich Lominadze

Flight attendants R.K. Nubarova and D.I. Rusova worked in the cabin, along with an officer of the Ministry of Internal Affairs monitoring the flight.

== Synopsis ==
The flight departed Kutaisi Airport at 18:10 with 114 passengers aboard. Eight passengers boarded the flight illegally. At 19:52 the Tu-104 was handed over to Moscow air traffic control. At 20:12:55 the controller gave Flight 964 permission to descend to an altitude of 400 metres (1,300 ft). 26 seconds later the aircraft was reported to be 11 kilometres (6.8 mi; 5.9 nmi) from Domodedovo at an altitude of 900 metres (3,000 ft). At 20:13:28 the crew reported that they were on a bearing of 317° (opposite to the runway) and at 20:15:55 the pilots informed the controller that they were having issues with their compass, while at an altitude of 900 metres. At 20:16:25 with the landing gear released, at a speed of 380–400 km/h (210–220 kn; 240–250 mph) and 19 kilometres (12 mi; 10 nmi) from the runway the aircraft began to perform a third right turn for the approach. No more radio transmissions were heard from the flight.

Visibility that night was at 2,400 metres (2.4 km; 1.5 mi). During approach while on a bearing of 143° the crew lost spatial orientation, entered a spin to the left and crashed in a field 16 kilometres (9.9 mi; 8.6 nmi) northwest of Domodedovo Airport (196 kilometres (122 mi; 106 nmi) from the airport reference point), striking several power lines. The field of debris was approximately 248 by 180 metres (814 by 591 ft; 271 by 197 yd); All 114 passengers and 8 crew were killed.

== Causes ==
The investigation concluded that after the first right turn executed by the aircraft (in which the bank exceeded 40°), multiple navigation instruments including the compass and artificial horizon failed. Combined with the poor visibility at the airport, the crew lost spatial orientation and were unable to see any landmarks to determine their position. When the plane banked slightly to the right, the pilots corrected the right bank only to put the plane into a sharp left bank that reached 70°, causing the crash.

== See also ==
- Aeroflot Flight 1912, a Tupolev Tu-104 crash caused by similar mechanical failures.
- Aeroflot Flight 2415, a Tupolev Tu-104, crashed during takeoff after experiencing similar failure of the artificial horizon.
- Aeroflot Flight 3932, also a Tupolev Tu-104, crashed during approach to Moscow experiencing failures of the compass and artificial horizon.
- Flash Airlines Flight 604
