= Aeroflot Flight 2415 =

1976 Soviet aircraft accident

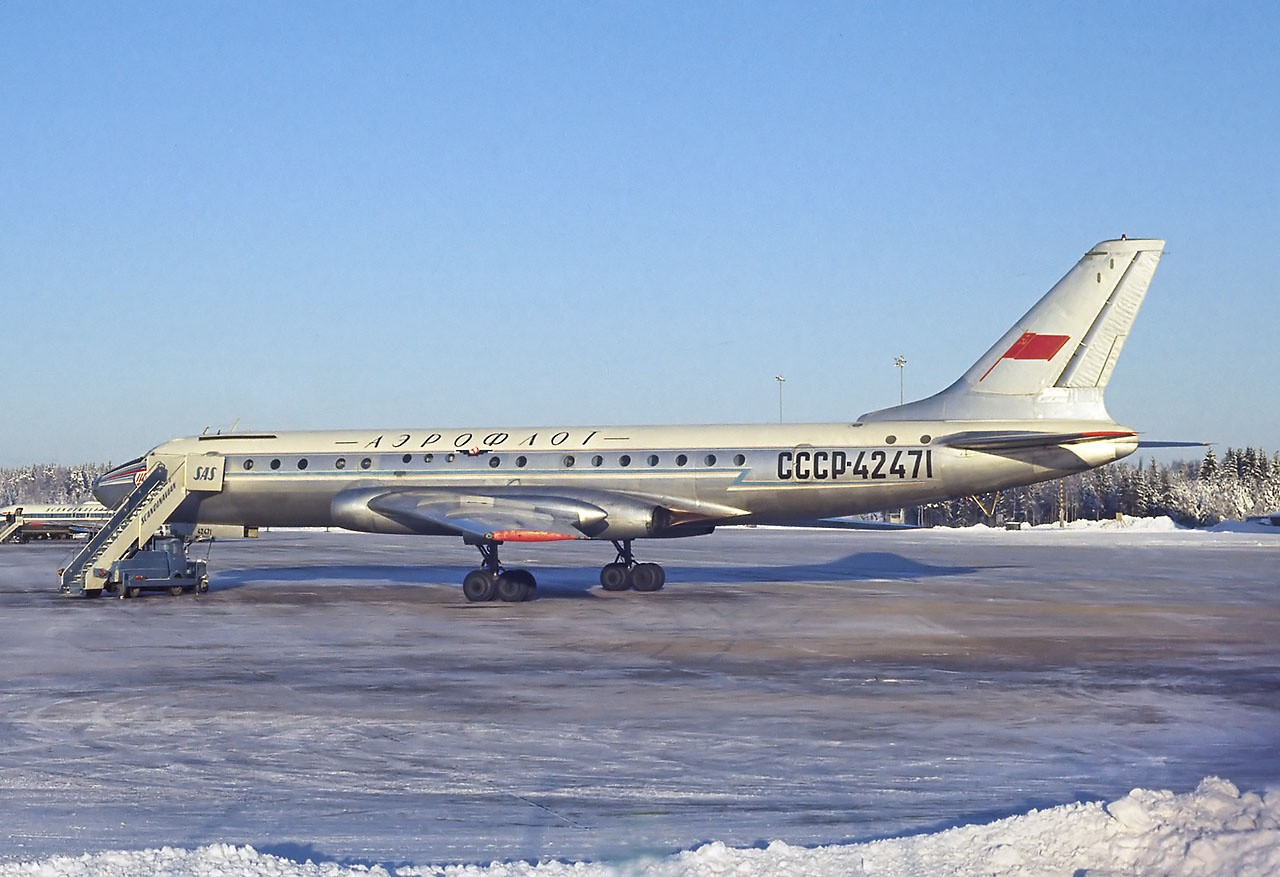
- CCCP-42471, the aircraft involved in the accident, seen in 1968

Accident
- Date: 28 November 1976
- Summary: Crew disorientation as a result of artificial horizon failure
- Site: Near Klushino, Moscow region; 56°01′11″N 37°17′30″E

Aircraft
- Aircraft type: Tupolev Tu-104B
- Operator: Aeroflot
- Registration: CCCP-42471
- Flight origin: Sheremetyevo International Airport, Moscow, Russia
- Destination: Pulkovo Airport, Saint Petersburg, Russia
- Occupants: 73
- Passengers: 67
- Crew: 6
- Fatalities: 73
- Survivors: 0

Aeroflot Flight 2415 was a regularly scheduled passenger flight from Moscow to Leningrad that crashed shortly after takeoff on 28 November 1976. The cause of the accident was attributed to crew disorientation as a result of artificial horizon failure in low visibility conditions.

== Aircraft ==
The aircraft involved in the accident was a Tupolev Tu-104B registered CCCP-42471 to Aeroflot-Russian Airlines. The aircraft rolled off the final assembly line of the Kazan Aircraft Production facility on 22 February 1960 and was delivered to the Ministry of Civil Aviation on 24 March 1960. In the aircraft's sixteen years of operation it accumulated 22,199 flight hours and 13,336 pressurization cycles.

== Crew and passengers ==
On board the plane were six crew members, of which four were cockpit crew and two were cabin crew.

The cockpit crew consisted of:

- Captain Boris Nikolaevich Gorokhovsky, (Russian: Борис Николаевич Гороховский) serving as the pilot in command
- Co-pilot Igor Borisovich Nikolaev, (Russian: Игорь Борисович Николаев)
- Navigator Vladimir Viktorovich Gusev (Russian: Владимир Викторович Гусев)
- Flight engineer Vladimir Grigorevich Vasiliev (Russian: Владимир Григорьевич Васильев)

In addition to the crew, there were 67 passengers on board; 65 from the Soviet Union and one each from Czechoslovakia and East Germany.

== Sequence of events ==
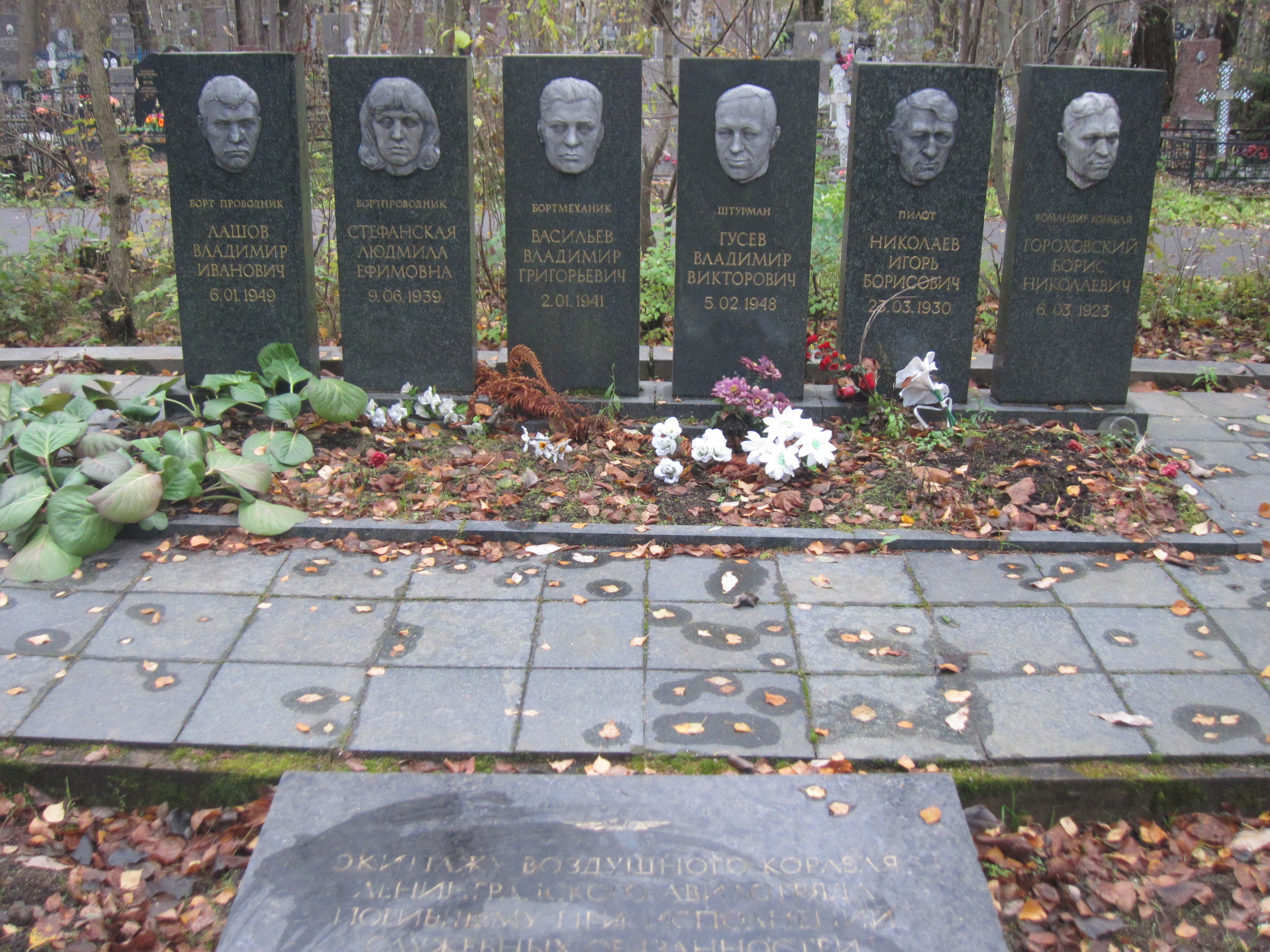
Memorial to the crew of flight 2415

Flight 2415 took off from Moscow-Sheremetyevo International Airport despite bad weather at 6:53 local time. On board the plane were the six crew members as well as 67 passengers, including four children. The weather forecast for the evening was cloudiness limiting visibility to 1,500 metres (1.5 km; 0.93 mi) at best with mild winds.

The plane took off from the runway at a safe speed of 290 kilometres per hour (160 kn; 180 mph). After takeoff the pilots reduced engine power and radioed the control tower for instructions to proceed. The crew was instructed to head on a bearing of 265°; the pilots performed the maneuver by setting the ailerons for banking to the right. After banking 265° the aircraft continued to bank to the right, losing altitude and picking up speed in the process, putting the aircraft into a steep dive. The plane crashed into the ground 9.5 kilometres (5.9 mi; 5.1 nmi) from the airport, exploding on impact and killing all passengers and crew aboard the plane.

== Causes ==
The State Supervisory Commission for Flight Safety board cited among the causes of the crash included failure of the artificial horizon, poor visibility from the cockpit, and lack of warnings indicating the failure of the artificial horizon. Due to the damage to the aircraft caused by the crash, it was impossible to determine if the ailerons were functioning correctly at the time. The cockpit voice recorder and flight data recorders were both missing the last six seconds of data, presumably as result of the damage in the post-crash fire. The board concluded that the crew demonstrated excellent calm in the emergency in their efforts to fly with incorrect data from the aircraft; weather was not determined to be a primary cause of the crash. One member of the board, Markov, disagreed with the findings of the report and attributed the accident to pilot error; but he was overruled by Gosavianadzor who sided with the rest of the board.

== See also ==
- Aeroflot Flight 964, also a Tupolev Tu-104, crashed on approach experiencing similar artificial horizon failure.
- Aeroflot Flight 3932, another Tupolev Tu-104, crashed shortly after takeoff experiencing similar artificial horizon failure.
- Aeroflot Flight 1912, another Tupolev Tu-104 accident caused by similar instrument failure.
