= Aeroflot Flight 558 =

1972 aviation accident

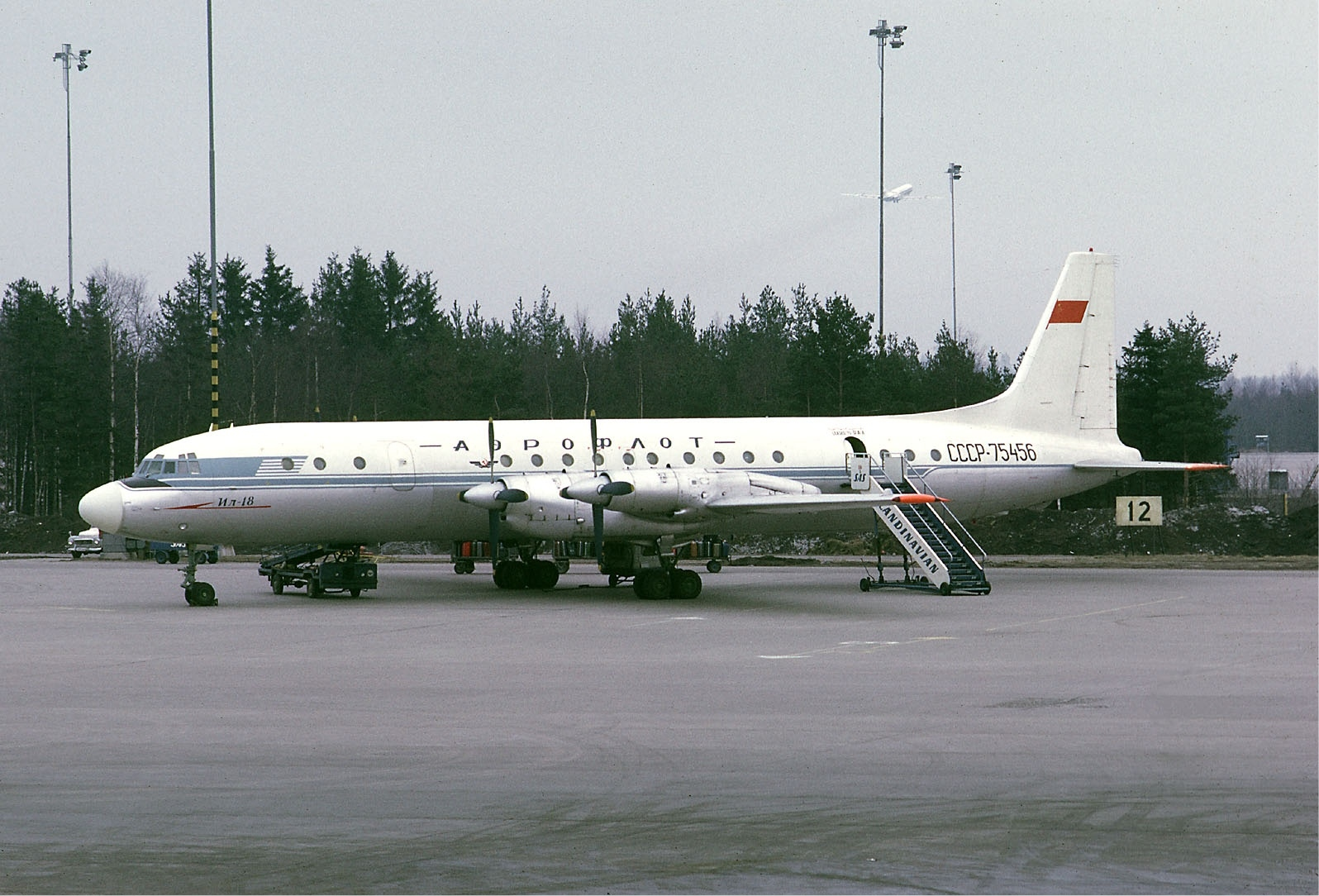
- An Aeroflot Ilyushin 18V, similar to the one involved in the accident

Accident
- Date: 31 August 1972
- Summary: In flight fire caused by onboard explosives
- Site: In the Abzelilovsky District; 53°35′59″N 58°48′54″E

Aircraft
- Aircraft type: Ilyushin Il-18V
- Operator: Aeroflot
- Registration: CCCP-74298
- Flight origin: Sary-Arka Airport, Karaganda
- Destination: Domodedovo International Airport, Moscow
- Occupants: 102
- Passengers: 93
- Crew: 9
- Fatalities: 102
- Survivors: 0

Aeroflot Flight 558 (Russian: Рейс 558 Аэрофлота Reys 558 Aeroflota) was a scheduled Ilyushin Il-18V domestic passenger flight from Karaganda to Moscow that crashed into a field in the Abzelilovsky District on August 31st 1972 as a result of a fire stemming from exploded passenger baggage, killing all 102 people on board.

== Aircraft ==
The aircraft involved in the accident was an Ilyushin Il-18V, registered CCCP-74298 to the Kazakhstan division of Aeroflot. The Il-18V completed final assembly and was delivered to Air Mali in 1962. In 1971, the aircraft was transferred to Aeroflot. At the time of the crash, the airliner had sustained 10,798 flight hours and 4,249 pressurization cycles.

== Crew ==
Nine crew members were aboard the flight. The cockpit crew consisted of:

- Captain Vladimir Ishutin
- Copilot Vyacheslav Tichotsky
- Navigator Alexander Dubolazov
- Flight engineer Yevgeny Prokopov
- Radio operator Nikolai Laptyaev

The flight was monitored by Anatoly Kuzovlev from the Ministry of Interior.

== Incident ==
Flight 558 took off from Sary-Arka Airport at 09:57 Moscow time and began climbing to an altitude of 7200 meters. The crew estimated that they would fly over Magnitogorsk at 10:11. However, at a distance of 45 kilometers from Magnitogorsk at 10:08:20, the crew reported the presence of smoke in the cabin. The flight was granted permission to descend to an altitude of 4,800 meters, and then switched over to Magnitogorsk air traffic control. The flight crew informed Magnitogorsk that there was a fire in the second cargo compartment, and requested instructions for an emergency landing. The flight was given permission to descend again at 10:12:32, approximately 20-30 kilometers from Magnitogorsk Airport and at an altitude of 2400–2700 meters Flight 558 began a turn to switch from a bearing of 295° to reach an initial bearing of 185° in the first of a series of maneuvers. After the first turn when the flight had reached a bearing of 90° and an altitude of 600 meters, the controller instructed them to start turning for 135°, and the flight proceeded to turn. When the flight was instructed to head for 185°, the crew confirmed hearing the instructions but did not execute the maneuver.

At 10:15:32, the controller informed the crew the flight was going off course, heading away from the airport; the crew only responded by saying "The smoke in the cockpit is very bad." At 10:15:50 the Il-18 was in dangerous proximity to the ground; the pilots responded by pulling on the controls, putting the engines in takeoff mode, and retracting the landing gear simultaneously, but the sudden overload on the aircraft caused by the maneuvers along with the passengers moving to the front of the plane to avoid the smoke caused an unanticipated reduction in climb.

At 10:16:19, the flight radioed only the phrase "Goodbye," but did not respond to the controller instructing them to enter a course for landing. The Il-18 crashed into a field 23 kilometers from the airport, before it was able to make an emergency landing in Magnitogorsk.

== Investigation ==
Investigators discovered that all the passengers in the cabin died from smoke inhalation before the aircraft crashed; only the captain, copilot, and navigator were killed by the impact of the crash because they were in the cockpit.

== Cause ==
Four intact explosive shells were found among the remains of the crash. Investigators determined the cause of the fire in the Ilyushin Il-18 cargo compartment was caused by explosives from passenger baggage that were prohibited from being placed in air cargo; the explosive materials then ignited highly flammable passenger baggage. There were no previous cases of a fire in the second baggage compartment of the Il-18 caused by mechanical failure, but there were four cases between 1970 and 1972 of passenger baggage spontaneously burning. The final report stated:

The cause of the accident was the rapid development of the fire that had developed in the second trunk, which led to a complete or partial loss of the crew's working capacity; causing the impossibility of following visual flight and observation of instruments due to smoke in the pilot's cabin resulting in the impossibility of a successful flight outcome.

== See also ==
- Valujet Flight 592
- UPS Airlines Flight 6
- Asiana Airlines Flight 991
- South African Airways Flight 295
