= LOT Polish Airlines Flight 232 =

1957 aviation accident

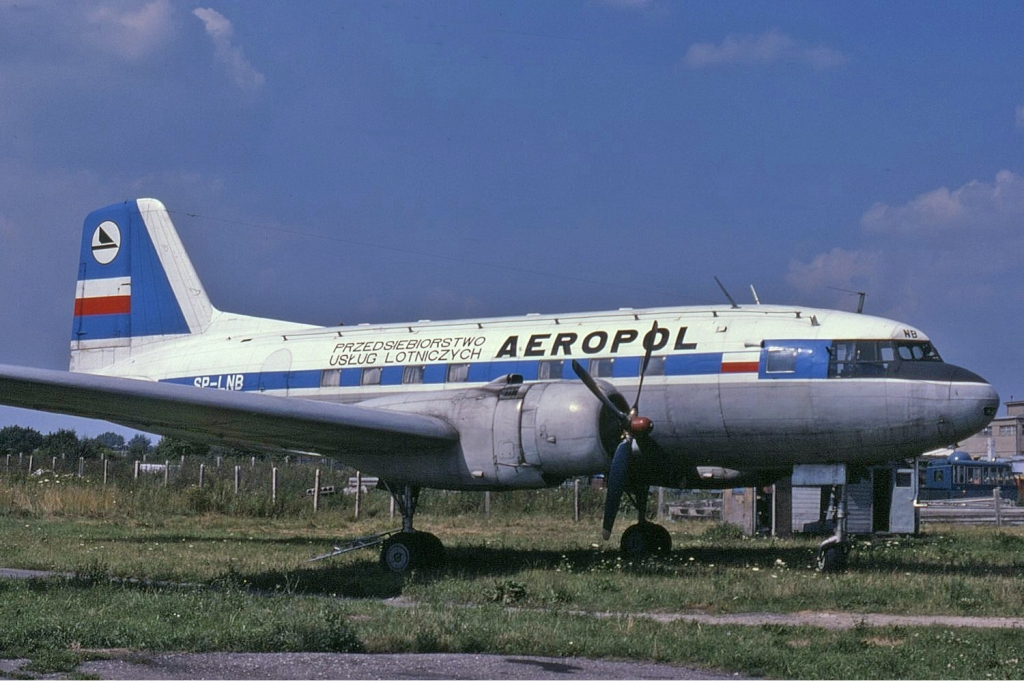
- A similar Il-14P to the aircraft involved in the accident.

Accident
- Date: 14 June 1957
- Summary: Controlled flight into terrain
- Site: 4.5 km northeast of Moscow Vnukovo Airport, Moscow, Soviet Union

Aircraft
- Aircraft type: Ilyushin Il-14P
- Operator: LOT Polish Airlines
- Registration: SP-LNF
- Flight origin: Warsaw-Okęcie Airport, Warsaw, Poland
- Destination: Moscow Vnukovo Airport, Moscow, Soviet Union
- Passengers: 8
- Crew: 5
- Fatalities: 9
- Injuries: 3
- Survivors: 4

LOT Polish Airlines Flight 232 was a regularly scheduled flight from Warsaw-Okęcie Airport to Moscow Vnukovo Airport. On 14 June 1957, the Ilyushin Il-14 operating the route crashed near Vnukovo in poor weather. The cause of the crash was determined to be pilot error.

The Minister of Foreign Affairs of Mongolia, along with eight others, were killed in the accident.

== Aircraft ==
The aircraft was an Ilyushin Il-14P, registered as SP-LNF, factory number 6341607, and serial number 16-07. It was manufactured in 1956. Two Shvetsov ASh-82T engines powered the aircraft.

Five crewmembers were on board the flight, which consisted of pilot-in-command Władysław Snacki, co-pilot Mieczysław Pląder, flight engineer Marian Siemieniak, radio operator Michał Łukaszewicz, and flight attendant Ewa Fedorowska.

== Accident ==
The Il-14 left Warsaw-Okęcie Airport for Moscow Vnukovo Airport on 14 June 1957. On board the aircraft were eight passengers, five crewmembers, and 819 kg (1,806 lb) of mail and cargo. The passengers included five American, Chinese, and Albanian citizens. The flight was routine, and no unusual issues were reported until radio contact was lost after leaving Vilna, Lithuania at 6 p.m.

A visibility of 4 km (2.5 mi; 2.2 nmi), wind speed 18 km/h (11 mph; 9.7 kn), heading 300°, cloudy weather, about six to eight cloud covers, and a cloud cover altitude of 600 m (2,000 ft) was forecast.

Communication between the pilots and Vnukovo ATC was established, and ATC instructed them to descend due to the stormy weather in the area. By the time the Il-14 was over Klimentievo, the aircraft was at an altitude of 400 m (1,300 ft). The flight crew then contacted ATC, reporting they had seen the ground. ATC told them to descend to 300 m (980 ft) and continue to Vnukovo. At 11:07 p.m. local time, the pilots were cleared for an instrument approach under the procedure prescribed to Vnukovo.

Despite acknowledging the procedure, the pilot failed to comply, leading to him descending to a very low altitude. At 11:10 p.m., the aircraft struck the ground, destroying it while also killing five passengers and four crewmembers. Among the deaths were multiple American passengers who were travelling throughout Europe and the Minister of Foreign Affairs of Mongolia. The flight attendant, Ewa Fedorowska, and three passengers survived the accident, but the three passengers were severely injured. Three American journalists who saw the crashed aeroplane did rescue work, including getting people out of the wrecked Il-14 and carrying them to an ambulance.

The weather in the area at the time was described as "very low ceiling, heavy turbulence, distant lightning, and driving rain". Weather forecasts at both airports predicted the weather better than reality.

== Cause ==
On 15 June, the day after the crash. Experts of the Polish airline went to the crash site for investigation. Polish and Soviet experts investigated the accident. The investigation ended on 20 June 1957, six days after the accident.

Investigation showed that the aircraft was in an appropriate technical condition to fly, and the plane and engines were functioning adequately when the accident happened. The wreckage of the Il-14 proved that the aircraft hit the ground at high speed, and the engines' power exceeded the usual operating power.

Furthermore, the crewmembers had enough experience and knowledge of the Il-14 required to operate the aircraft. Additionally, instructions and charts were available on the aeroplane.

The probable cause listed in the general description of the accident reads as follows:

The aircraft hit the ground while flying at an excessively low altitude following the crew's application of an approach procedure other than that prescribed by Vnukovo Aerodrome. The bad weather conditions which set in during the night and were not forecast in the messages had their influence on the disastrous end of the flight.

== See also ==
- Aeroflot Flight 200, another Il-14 accident at Vnukovo.
