= Aeroflot Flight 25 =

1963 aviation accident

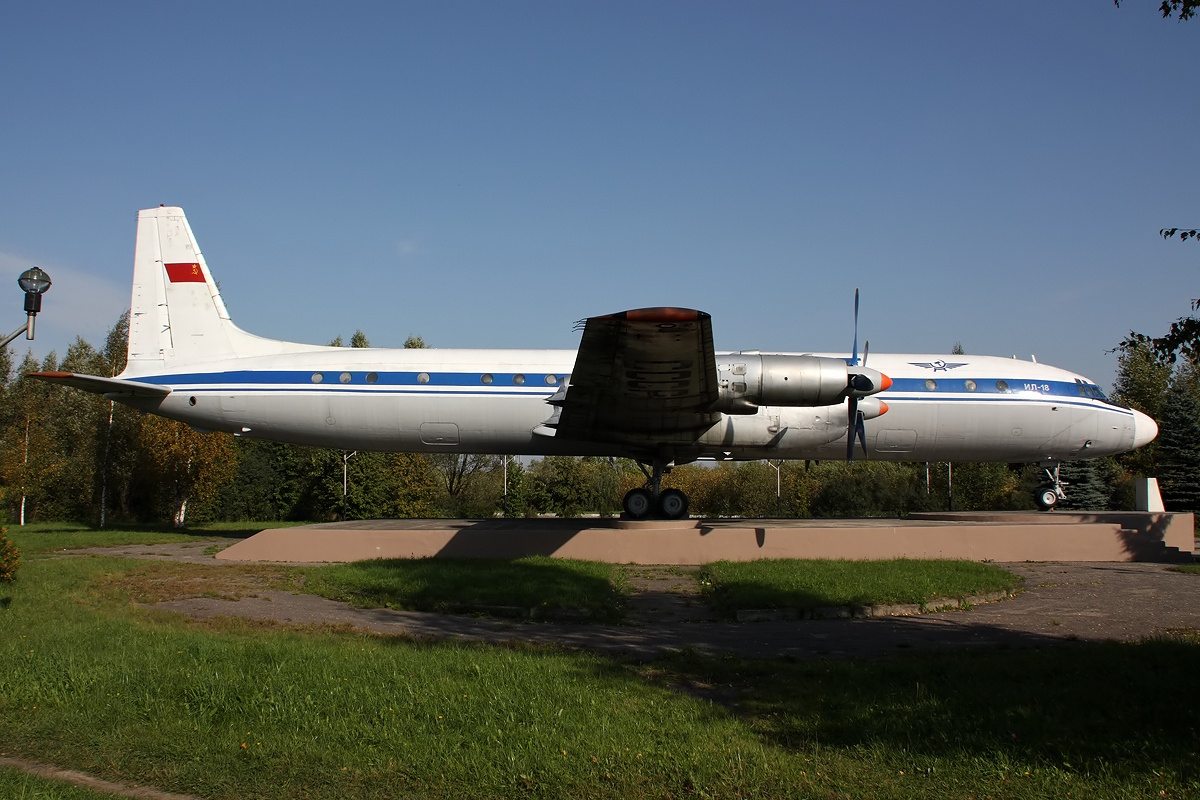
- An Aeroflot Il-18V, similar to the one involved in the accident

Accident
- Date: 4 April 1963
- Summary: Reversing propeller, loss of control
- Site: Pestrechinsky District, Tatar ASSR; 55°28′12″N 50°23′50″E

Aircraft
- Aircraft type: Ilyushin Il-18V
- Operator: Aeroflot
- Registration: СССР-75866
- Flight origin: Sheremetyevo International Airport, Moscow
- Destination: Krasnoyarsk-Severny Airport, Krasnoyarsk
- Occupants: 67
- Passengers: 59
- Crew: 8
- Fatalities: 67
- Survivors: 0

Aeroflot Flight 25 (Russian: Рейс 25 Аэрофлота Reys 25 Aeroflota) was a scheduled domestic passenger flight that crashed on 4 April 1963 in the region of Rybnaya Sloboda, Tatar ASSR, Russian SFSR while en route from Moscow-Sheremetyevo to Krasnoyarsk Airport, Russian SFSR. All 67 people aboard were killed in the accident.

== Aircraft ==
The aircraft involved in the accident was an Ilyushin Il-18V registered CCCP-75866 and manufactured on 26 February 1963. By 2 March it was transferred to the Main Directorate of the Civil Air Fleet and sent to the 126th (Krasnoyarsk) air detachment of the Krasnoyarsk territorial administration of Aeroflot. At the time of the accident, the aircraft had sustained only 154 flight hours and 68 pressurization cycles because it had been released from the factory just in March that same year.

== Description of accident ==
Flight 25 departed from Moscow-Sheremetyevo at 03:12 local time and held an altitude of 6000 meters after takeoff. 59 passengers and 8 crew members were aboard the aircraft. Due to the rate of fuel consumption the crew requested permission from the controller to increase altitude to 8000 meters, but the request was initially denied because there was a Tu-104 at that altitude in the same air corridor. At 04:15 the Tu-104 reported passing Kanash and was approximately 40-50 kilometers past the Il-18. The air traffic controller then gave the Il-18 permission to climb to an altitude of 8000 meters at 04:22. The crew confirmed receiving the permission, and at 04:26 the flight reported passing Laishevo at an altitude of 7500 meters while ascending to the altitude of 8000 meters. This was the last communication from the aircraft and when the controller attempted to reach the aircraft at 04:30, no response was heard. The No. 4 engine malfunctioned in such a way that it initiated reverse thrust causing severe drag on the right wing; pilots had to feather both propellers on the right wing because they could not figure out which propeller was responsible for the failure in time. The severe drag led to the aircraft descending sharply until it briefly retained controlled flight at altitudes between 150–200 meters; the harsh aerodynamic loads the aircraft endured tore off both ailerons and the aircraft then plummeted into the ground. The aircraft crashed into a field in Pestrechinsky at 04:30 at a speed of 500–600 km/h, killing all 67 people on board.

== Conclusions ==
The commission responsible for the investigation of the accident determined that the most likely cause of the accident was the failure of the No. 4 propeller pitch control mechanism on the right wing, which malfunctioned and created severe drag. The failure of the pitch control mechanism led to the subsequent failure of the speed regulator while in the lower position causing the screw to initiate thrust reversal. Because the crew was unable to establish which of the right props was causing drag, both propellers had to be feathered. The amount of drag on the right wing had put the aircraft in a sharp descent, in which the aircraft recovered from briefly before both ailerons tore off the aircraft and the aircraft crashed. Laboratory simulation showed that the failure of the pitch control mechanism was caused by a defect in the oil sealing rubber gasket on the oil transporter of the screw which was caused by incorrect assembly of the AV-68I propeller at the factory. The defect in the mechanism could not be detected in flight and only could be seen by examining the screw and checking it for defects during maintenance.
