= Aeroflot Flight 15 =

1968 aviation accident

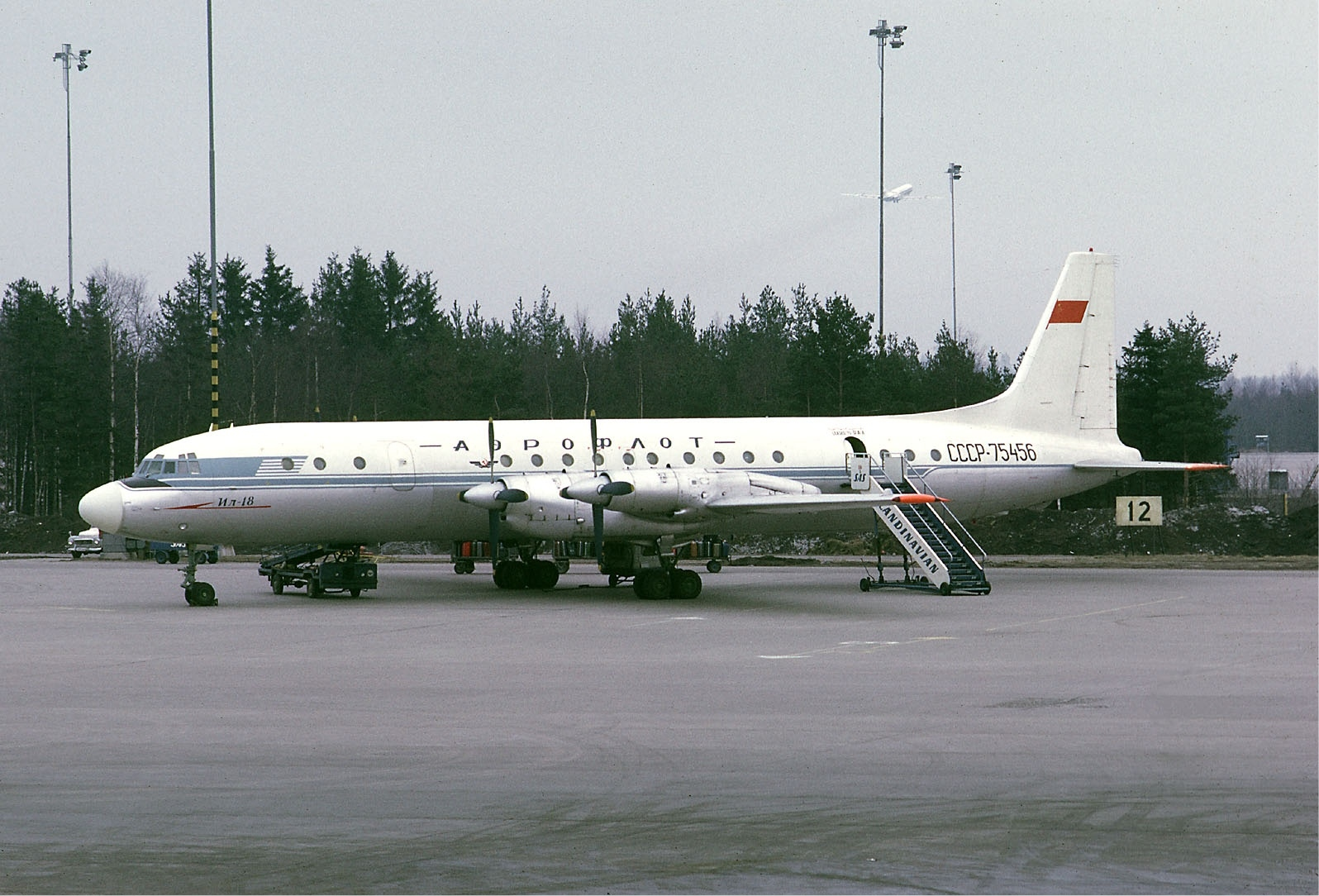
- An Aeroflot Ilyushin Il-18D, similar to the one involved in the accident.

Accident
- Date: 29 February 1968
- Summary: Loss of control due to undetermined reasons
- Site: Parchum, Chunsky District, Irkutsk Oblast, USSR

Aircraft
- Aircraft type: Ilyushin Il-18D
- Operator: Aeroflot
- Registration: CCCP-74252
- Flight origin: Domodedovo International Airport
- Stopover: Yemelyanovo International Airport
- Destination: Petropavlovsk-Kamchatsky Airport
- Occupants: 84
- Passengers: 75
- Crew: 9
- Fatalities: 83
- Injuries: 1
- Survivors: 1

Aeroflot Flight 15 (Russian: Рейс 15 Аэрофлота Reys 15 Aeroflota) was a passenger flight from Moscow-Domodedovo Airport to Petropavlovsk-Kamchatsky Airport with a stopover at Yemelyanovo Airport that crashed on 29 February 1968 en route to Petropavlovsk. All but one aboard the aircraft were killed in the crash.

== Aircraft ==
The aircraft involved in the accident was an Ilyushin Il-18D registered CCCP-74252 to the Aeroflot Far East Civil Aviation Directorate. At the time of the accident, the aircraft had 342 flight hours and 89 pressurization cycles.

== Background ==
The cockpit crew consisted of:

- Captain Eugene A. Berezhnov
- Co-Pilot Vladimir Makarov
- Navigator Benedict E. Dernov
- Flight Engineer Nikolai Vasilyes
- Radio operator Ivan M. Pashchenko

A total of 75 passengers were also onboard, 11 of whom were children.

== Accident ==
The flight successfully completed the Moscow-Yemelyanovo part of the route. At 22:03 (17:03 Moscow time), the Il-18 took off from Yemelyanovo with 64 adults and 11 children as passengers; two passengers were not registered. After completing takeoff the flight maintained an altitude of 8,000 meters. At 22:37 local time (17:37 Moscow time) the flight crew switched communications to Bratsk air traffic control. Weather conditions were reported to be normal at the time. The aircraft was established to be at a distance of 234 kilometers from the airport at a bearing of 270° degrees. The crew confirmed receiving the information, stating that they were at an altitude of 8,000 meters and flying at 780 km/h, and expected to fly past Bratsk at 23:06.

At 22:38:38, the airliner was forced into sudden descent. The situation onboard evolved into a full-blown emergency at 22:41:28. When the flight was at an altitude of 3,000 meters, air traffic controllers detected a short unintelligible transmission at 22:43:12 from the flight, determined by investigators to be most likely about the state of the aircraft. The crew unintentionally pitched the aircraft further down to the point of overspeed while trying to correct the pitch of the aircraft. The "fasten seat belt" sign was turned on and at one point the airliner was inverted. At an altitude of 1,000 meters and at a speed of 890 km/h, the airliner began to break apart, and at 22:43:47 the airliner crashed 13 kilometers away from Parchum and 165 kilometers west of Bratsk airport into the taiga. The only survivor was a young soldier named Vasily Andriyenko that was in the flight to return to its unit in Kamchatka Krai. He was found alive but injured at the crash site with multiple fractures on his legs, head, and spine after having to survive all night in the forest.

== Investigation ==
The investigation hypothesized that an emergency onboard caused the crew to descend, and in doing so control of the aircraft was lost when engine number three did not perform as expected. Examination of the left wing showed evidence of a fuel leak, which was presumed to have caused an onboard fire; that part of the wing was not equipped with fire detection or fire extinguishing systems. However, the commission responsible for the investigation later rejected the claim of an in-flight fire in the left wing caused by a leak, stating that the exact cause of the emergency is unknown.
