= Aeroflot Flight 5003 (1977) =

1977 Il-18 airliner accident

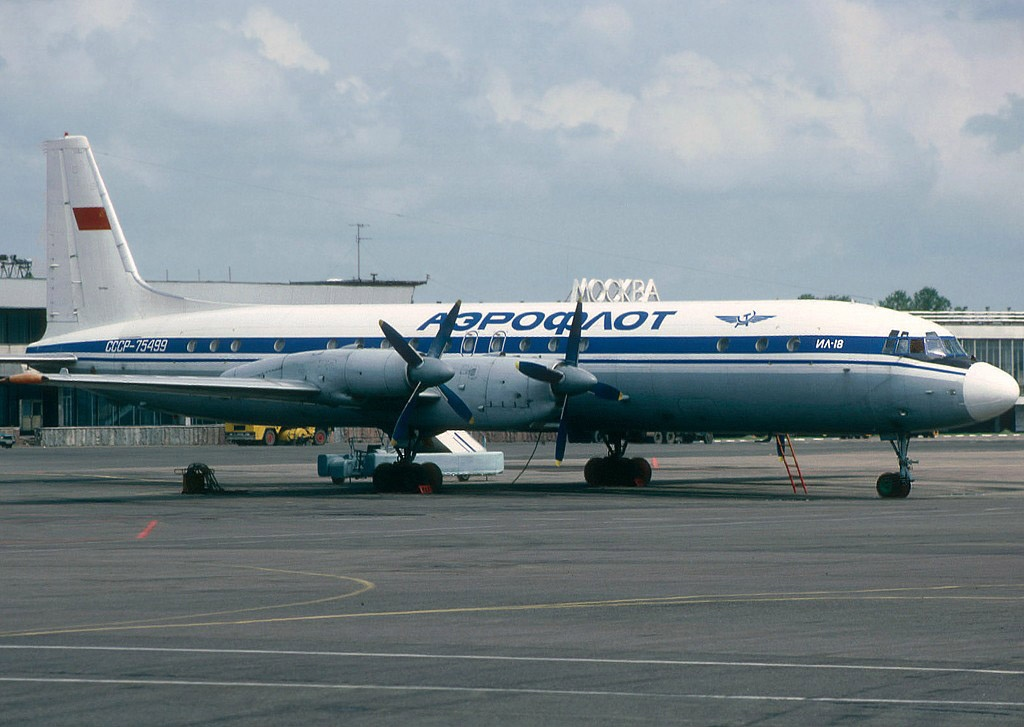
- An Aeroflot Ilyushin Il-18 similar to the one involved in the crash

Accident
- Date: 15 February 1977
- Summary: Stalled on approach due to pilot error
- Site: Near Mineralnye Vody, Stavropol Krai

Aircraft
- Aircraft type: Ilyushin Il-18V
- Operator: Aeroflot
- Registration: CCCP-75520
- Flight origin: Tashkent International Airport
- Stopover: Nukus Airport
- Destination: Mineralnye Vody Airport
- Occupants: 98
- Passengers: 92
- Crew: 6
- Fatalities: 77
- Survivors: 21

Aeroflot Flight 5003 was a scheduled passenger flight from Tashkent to Mineralnye Vody with a stopover in Nukus; the Ilyushin 18V operating the route on 15 February 1977 crashed near the district of Mineralnye Vody while climbing after a missed approach. Of the 98 people on board, 77 perished in the crash.

== Aircraft involved ==
The aircraft involved in the accident was an Ilyushin Il-18V, registered CCCP-75520 to Aeroflot. In 1963, the aircraft was transferred to the Ministry of Civil Aviation, which sent it to the Tashkent Air Division of the Uzbek Civil Aviation Administration. The cabin had a capacity of 89 seats, but 92 passengers were permitted on the aircraft. At the time of the accident, the aircraft had 29,443 flight hours and 10,817 pressurization cycles.

== Passengers and crew ==
On board flight 5003 were 92 passengers, of which 4 were children. Six crew members were also aboard the flight, led by pilot in command N. A. Konovalenko (Н. А. Коноваленко) and joined by first officer B.V. Polyakov (Б.В. Поляков), flight engineer N.I. Sorokin (Н. И. Сорокин), and navigator A.P. Vishnevetsky (А. П. Вишневецкий). Two flight attendants were also on board the flight.

== Synopsis ==
The crash happened on the Nukus-Mineralnye Vody part of the route. At the time of the accident, the weather conditions at Mineralnye Vody Airport were reported to be low-level clouds and fog less than 100 meters above the ground, ice was present on the ground, and visibility ranged between 1020 and 1180 meters. The aircraft approached the airport at a heading of 117°. While preparing for landing the crew lowered the flaps and reduced the speed of the aircraft from 290 to 260 km/h; during the approach the crew was distracted monitoring instruments and searching for landmarks, resulting in their failure to notice the flight drifting slightly off course. At 1.5 kilometers from the airport, the pilots realized the deviation and changed the heading to 127°, but the pilot in command realized the landing was impossible and went around for a second approach. The flight, while attempting to disengage the first approach, did not climb 300 meters in a straight line, but instead turned right at 80–90 meters above the ground, losing altitude; placing it in a 4–5° roll. The speed of the aircraft reached 270 km/h, and then at an altitude of 120–130 meters the crew adjusted the flaps too quickly at the same time. The pilot in command pulled the nose up until the aircraft was pitched 11°, which led to an overload of 1.64 gs. The excessive g force damaged the ailerons, rudder, and other control surfaces. The aircraft continued turning to the right despite the crew's attempts to adjust the ailerons. In just eight seconds the flight rolled from a heading of 165° to 205°. The aircraft entered a right bank of 10–30° Il-18 flew at a heading 102° towards the airport, which the pilots attempted to correct; the pilots tried to gain altitude, but at 23:17:44, flying at a speed of 285 km/h at a heading of 216° and with a left bank of 5-8°, the aircraft hit the ground, damaging a railroad.

== Causes ==
The investigation attributed the accident to crew error. The pilots missed the approach, and when aborting the landing put the aircraft at too sharp angle of attack, causing a stall and damaging the control surfaces.

== See also ==
- Manx2 Flight 7100 - Also crashed in fog after missed approach
- Flydubai Flight 981 - crashed in poor visibility conditions
