= 1958 Aeroflot Tu-104 Kanash crash =

Aviation accident in the Soviet Union

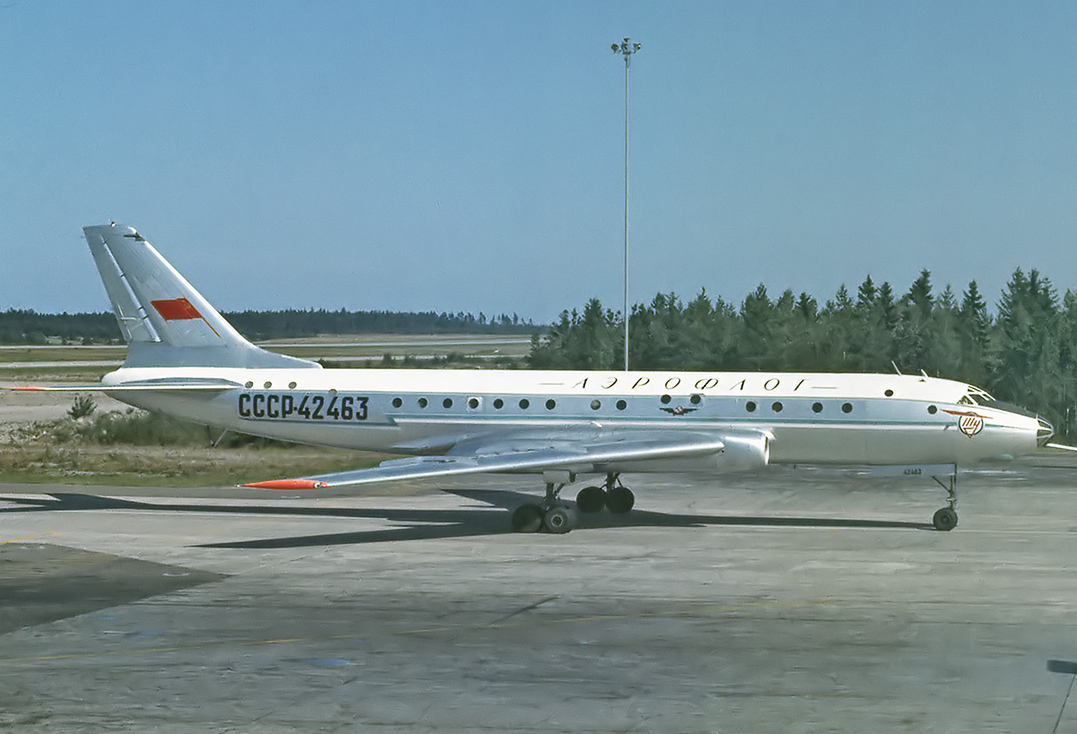
- An Aeroflot Tu-104A, similar to the one involved in the accident

Accident
- Date: 17 October 1958
- Summary: Severe turbulence leading to loss of control
- Site: 17 miles west of Kanash, Chuvashia, Soviet Union; 58°28′31″N 47°7′22″E

Aircraft
- Aircraft type: Tupolev Tu-104A
- Operator: Aeroflot
- Registration: CCCP-42362
- Flight origin: Beijing International Airport
- Stopover: Omsk Airport
- Destination: Moscow-Vnukovo Airport
- Occupants: 80
- Passengers: 71
- Crew: 9
- Fatalities: 80
- Survivors: 0

The 1958 Aeroflot Tu-104 Kanash crash occurred on 17 October 1958 when a Tupolev Tu-104A operated by Aeroflot flying an international route from Beijing to Moscow crashed in bad weather near the town of Kanash, Chuvashia, Soviet Union, four hundred miles east of Moscow, killing all 80 people on board. The flight was carrying high-level diplomatic delegations from numerous Soviet aligned countries such as China, East Germany, and Czechoslovakia. It was just the second fatal accident involving the Tu-104 which had been introduced into Aeroflot's inventory two years earlier, and the deadliest in the airline's history until the crash of Aeroflot Flight 902 in 1962.

== Aircraft ==
The aircraft involved in the accident was a Tupolev Tu-104A, registered CCCP-42362 to Aeroflot. The Tu-104A was a relatively new aircraft at the time, having been introduced in 1956. It was based on the design of the Soviet strategic bomber, Tupolev Tu-16, but included a wider, pressurized fuselage in order to seat passengers. At the time of the accident, CCCP-42362 had sustained a mere 465 flight hours and had been in service for less than three months.

== Passengers and crew ==
=== Crew ===
Aboard were three flight attendants and a cockpit crew consisting of:

- Check Captain: Garold Dmitrievich Kuznetsov
- Captain: Anton Filimonovich Artemov
- Co-pilot: Igor Alexandrovich Rogozin
- Flight engineer: Ivan Vladimirovich Veselov
- Navigator: Yevgeny Andreevich Mumrienko
- Radio operator: Alexander Sergeevich Fedorov

=== Passengers ===
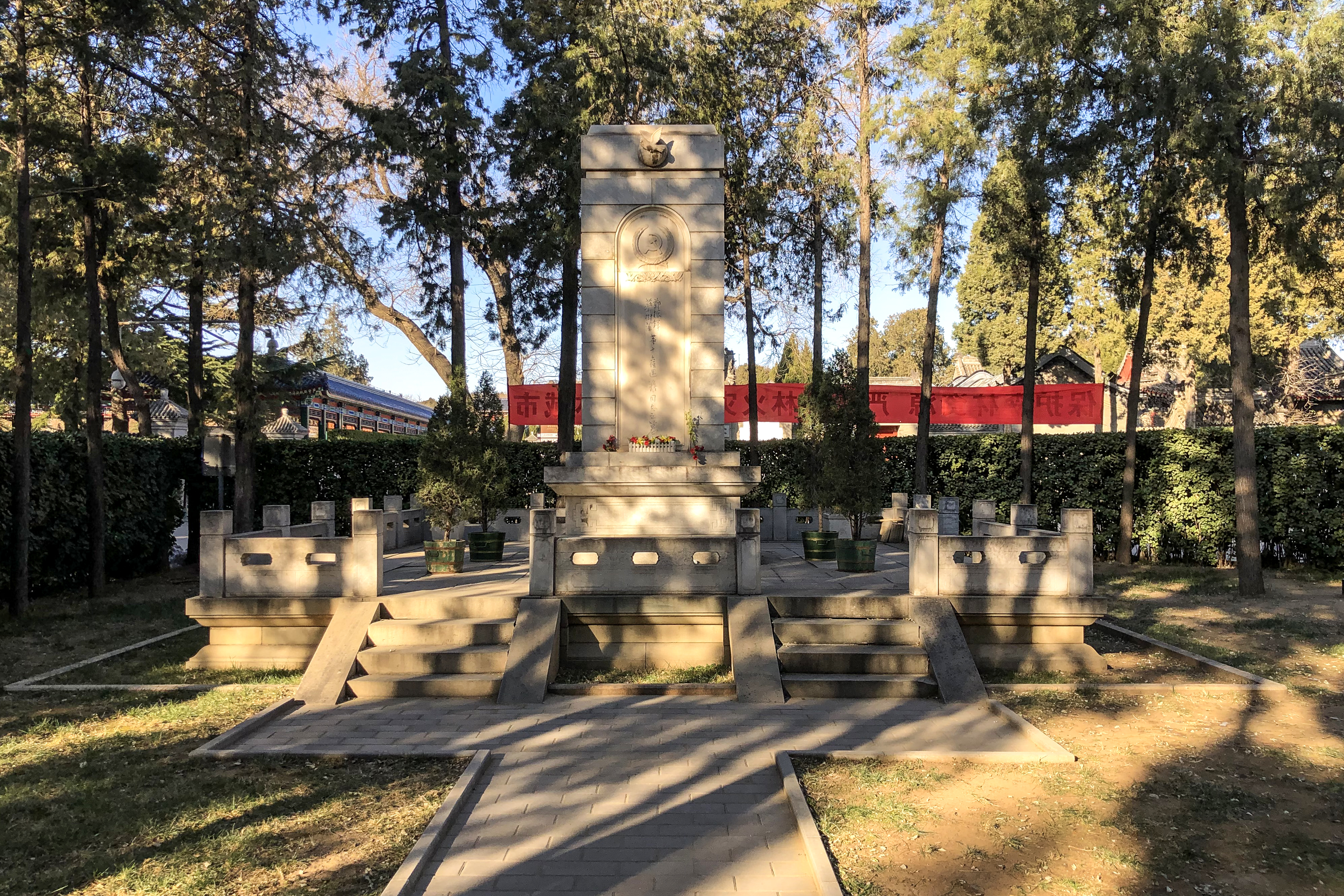
Monument to the victims of Kanash Tu-104 crash at Babaoshan Revolutionary Cemetery

The passengers on board the flight consisted by and large of diplomatic delegations from numerous foreign nations, most of them Soviet allies, who were on their way to Moscow for an official event. The largest group of passengers aboard the aircraft were Soviet citizens, however a sixteen-person Chinese Communist delegation, led by prominent writer and academic Cheng Chen-to (Zheng Zhenduo) and Tsai Sha-fan, comprised the largest group of foreign citizens on the flight. The single Cambodian citizen on the flight was Cambodia's ambassador to China.

=== Nationalities ===
| Nationality | Passengers | Crew | Total |
|---|---|---|---|
| Soviet Union | 17 | 9 | 26 |
| People's Republic of China | 16 | 0 | 16 |
| Czechoslovakia | 8 | 0 | 8 |
| East Germany | 5 | 0 | 5 |
| France | 5 | 0 | 5 |
| Hungary | 5 | 0 | 5 |
| Romania | 3 | 0 | 3 |
| Sudan | 3 | 0 | 3 |
| Morocco | 3 | 0 | 3 |
| Great Britain | 2 | 0 | 2 |
| Poland | 1 | 0 | 1 |
| Iraq | 1 | 0 | 1 |
| Cambodia | 1 | 0 | 1 |
| Laos | 1 | 0 | 1 |
| Total | 71 | 9 | 80 |

== Synopsis ==
CCCP-42362 took off from Beijing en route to Moscow on 17 October 1958. It landed at its stopover in Omsk, Russia before continuing west to its final destination. As it neared Moscow-Vnukovo Airport, authorization to land was denied by controllers due to heavy fog. The pilots diverted to their alternate, Gorky Airport, before proceeding to Sverdlovsk after the weather in Gorky was also deemed unsuitable for landing. At this point the aircraft was flying at an altitude of 10,000 meters (33,000 ft) when it suddenly flew into an area of high turbulence causing the aircraft to experience a sudden and drastic increase in pitch.

Caught in a powerful updraft, the aircraft abruptly reached an altitude of 12,000 meters (39,000 ft). According to one of the pilots per the cockpit voice recording, the aircraft was "standing on its hind legs", and shortly after it entered a sharp, near vertical dive followed by a spin. Despite the efforts of the crew, the force on the aircraft's horizontal stabilizers was too great for the pilots to overcome and an impact with the ground became inevitable. The flight's pilot-in-command, Harold Kuznetsov, instructed the radio operator to transmit details about the aircraft's situation to ground controllers before shouting "... we're dying! Goodbye!", according to the black box recordings. At 21:30 MSK, the Tu-104A crashed near Apnerka rail station, west of the town of Kanash.

== Conclusions ==
The investigation into the crash was led by Minister of Aircraft Production Mikhail Khrunichev and Chief Air Marshal Pavel Zhigarev, the head of Aeroflot. The cause of the crash was determined to be a loss of control as a result of the aircraft flying into an area of strong turbulence which caused it to exceed critical angles of attack. This conclusion was reached by comparing the experience of other Tu-104 pilots who reported similar cases after flying at altitudes of 8,000 meters (26,000 ft)) and higher, and examination of the cockpit voice recordings. As a result of the crash, authorities limited the maximum flight level of the Tu-104 to 9,000 meters (29,500 ft) and a redesign of the aircraft's stabilizers was undertaken.

== See also ==
- Aeroflot Flight 04
- Braniff International Airways Flight 250
- United Airlines Flight 585
- Eastwind Airlines Flight 517
