= 1981 Pushkin Tu-104 crash =

Plane crash in Leningrad, USSR

1981 Pushkin Tu-104A crash
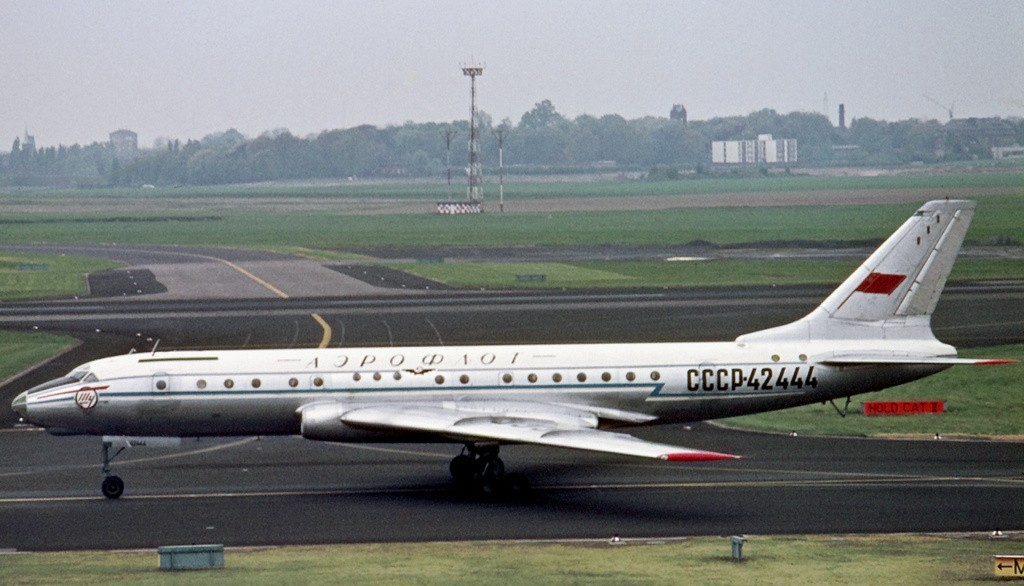
- A Tu-104 similar to the accident aircraft. This would crash as Aeroflot Flight 1691.

Accident
- Date: 7 February 1981
- Summary: Improper cargo loading
- Site: 20 meters southwest of the runway at Pushkin Airport; 59°40′29.1″N 30°19′26.5″E

Aircraft
- Aircraft type: Tupolev Tu-104A
- Operator: Pacific Fleet of the Soviet Navy
- Registration: CCCP-42332
- Flight origin: Pushkin Airport
- Stopover: Khabarovsk Novy Airport
- Destination: Vladivostok Int'l Airport (1981: Knevichi Airport)
- Occupants: 50
- Passengers: 44
- Crew: 6
- Fatalities: 50
- Survivors: 0

On 7 February 1981, a Tupolev Tu-104A passenger jet crashed during take off from Pushkin Airport near Leningrad, Soviet Union, resulting in the death of all 50 people on board, including 28 high-ranking Soviet military personnel. The official investigation concluded that the aircraft was improperly loaded.

== Accident ==
At 18:00 local time, the Tu-104A lined up on runway 21 and commenced its take-off run during snowing weather conditions. After rotation, the aircraft pitched up beyond normal take-off attitude, and eight seconds after lift off, at an altitude above ground level of 50 m (160 ft), the Tupolev stalled and entered a right bank. The aircraft continued to roll right until it struck the ground 20 m (66 ft) from the departure end of the runway, crashing nearly inverted and bursting into flames, killing 49 of the 50 people on board. One person in the cockpit was ejected from the nose of the aircraft, and was found alive in the snow not far from the crash site, but died on the way to a hospital.

== Aircraft ==
The Tupolev Tu-104A involved was initially registered as СССР-Л5426 (Cyrillic, usually rendered as CCCP-L5426 in English-language publications); construction was completed on 26 July 1957. The aircraft was sent to Aeroflot's Far East division. In 1959 it was re-registered to CCCP-42332 and continued flying with Aeroflot until 6 October 1961, when it was transferred to the Soviet Navy.

== Investigation ==
The investigation of the accident revealed that the crew allowed the aircraft to be improperly loaded. Evidence was uncovered that led investigators to believe that some military officers did not comply with seating assignments given by the crew and that these officers pressured the crew to make the flight in an unsafely loaded aircraft. Another factor reported by witnesses was that large rolls of printing paper were loaded on board, and these are believed to have rolled rearward during acceleration on take-off, causing the center of gravity to shift aft of acceptable limits, thereby reducing the stability of the aircraft in pitch, making lowering the nose impossible for the crew, and the crash inevitable.

== Casualties ==
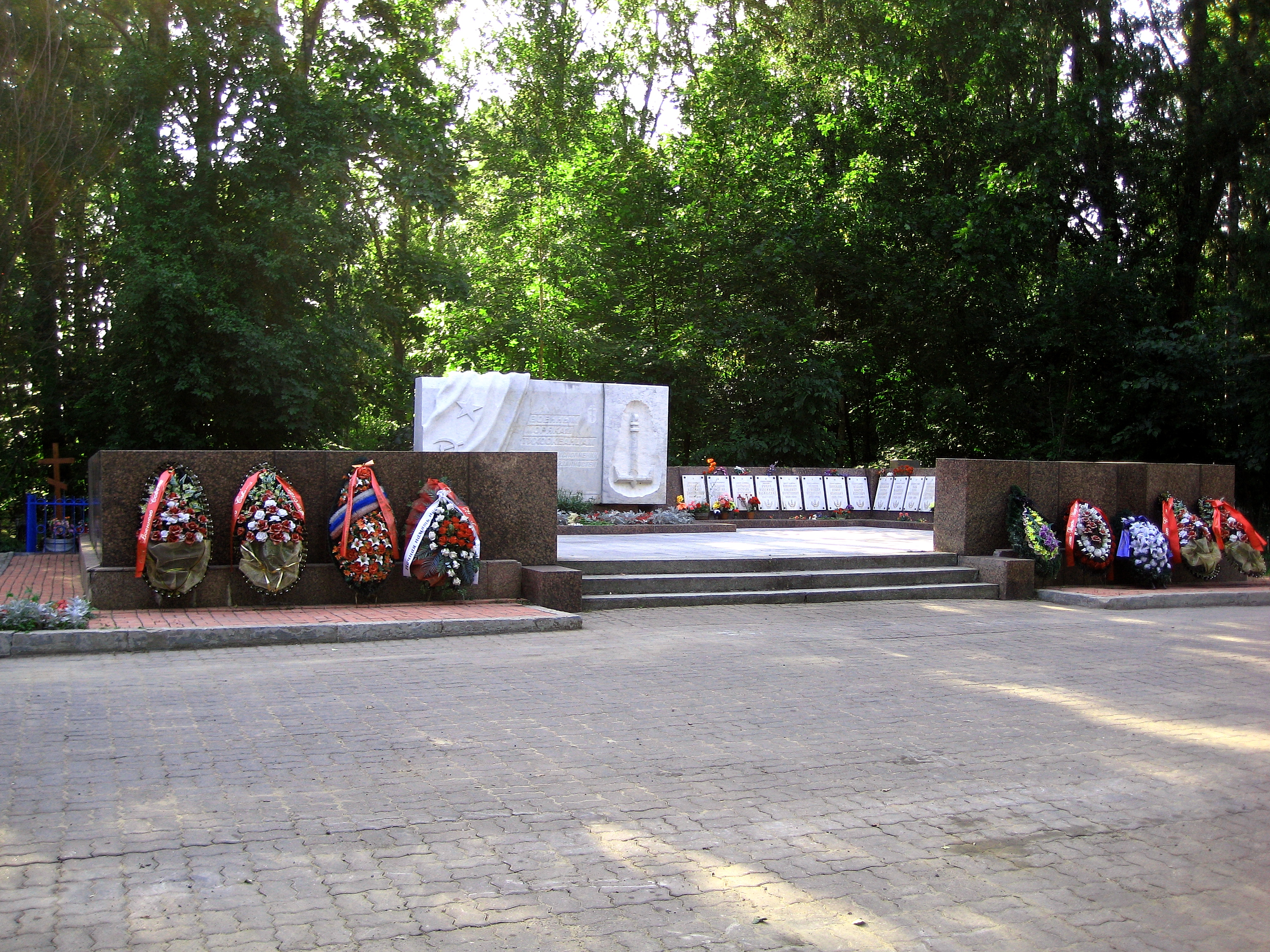
Memorial in the Serafimovskoe Cemetery, St Petersburg to those who died in the 1981 crash

The Tupolev Tu-104A was carrying many of the Pacific Fleet's senior officers from Leningrad, where they had been attending meetings with the naval command, to Vladivostok, via Khabarovsk. Among the dead were 16 admirals and generals, including the commander of the Pacific Fleet, Admiral Emil Spiridonov, and his wife. They were both interred with most of the other victims of the crash in the Serafimovskoe Cemetery in Leningrad, where a memorial to the dead was erected on the orders of the Navy's commander-in-chief, Sergey Gorshkov. A memorial service is held annually on 7 February at the St. Nicholas Naval Cathedral in St Petersburg, and on the 20th anniversary of the crash, the line: "Those who died in the line of duty on 7 February 1981", and an Orthodox cross were added to the memorial stele commemorating the Pacific Navy sailors.

== See also ==
- 1972 Puerto Rico DC-7 crash
