= Flight 773 =

Flight 773 may refer to the following accidents and incidents involving commercial airliners:

- Pacific Air Lines Flight 773, which crashed on May 7, 1964 due to the pilot being shot by a passenger, resulting in the death of all other 43 people on board.
- Aeroflot Flight 773 crashed following a bomb explosion on 10 October 1971
- Iran Aseman Airlines Flight 773, a runway overshot on 26 August 2010 with two injured passengers.
