= Tupolev Tu-104 =

Former Soviet airliner

- Aeroflot Tupolev Tu-104A at Arlanda Airport in 1972

General information
- Type: Narrow-body jetliner
- Manufacturer: Tupolev OKB, Kharkiv Aviation Factory, Kazan Aircraft Production Association, Omsk Aviation Plant 166
- Designer: Andrei Tupolev
- Status: Retired
- Primary users: Aeroflot ČSA
- Number built: 201

History
- Manufactured: 1956–1960
- Introduction date: 15 September 1956 (Aeroflot)
- First flight: 17 June 1955; 71 years ago
- Retired: 1981
- Developed from: Tupolev Tu-16
- Developed into: Tupolev Tu-110; Tupolev Tu-124; Tupolev Tu-107

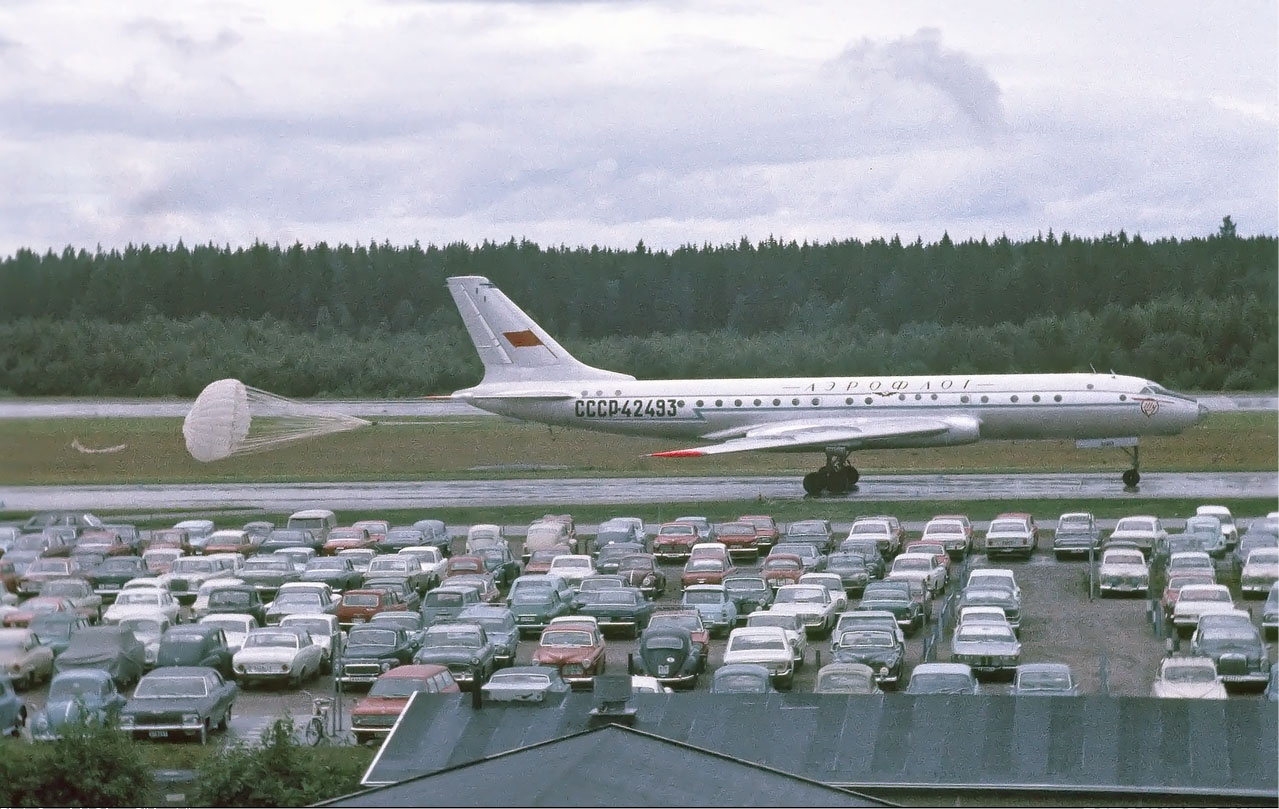
Aeroflot Tupolev Tu-104B at Arlanda Airport in 1968, with drag parachute deployed

The Tupolev Tu-104 (NATO reporting name: Camel) is a medium-range, narrow-body, twin turbojet-powered Soviet airliner. It was the second jetliner to enter regular service, after the British de Havilland Comet and was the only jetliner operating in the world from 1956 to 1958, when the British jetliners were grounded after several crashes.

In 1957, Czechoslovak Airlines – ČSA (now Czech Airlines) became the first airline in the world to fly a route exclusively with jet airliners, using the Tu-104A variant between Prague and Moscow. In civilian service, the Tu-104 carried over 90 million passengers with Aeroflot (then the world's largest airline), and a lesser number with ČSA, while it also was operated by the Soviet Air Force. Its successors included the Tu-124, Tu-134, and Tu-154.

== Design and development ==
At the beginning of the 1950s, the Soviet Union's Aeroflot airline needed a modern airliner with better capacity and performance than the piston-engined aircraft then in operation. The design request was filled by the Tupolev OKB, which based their new airliner on its Tu-16 "Badger" strategic bomber. The wings, engines, and tail surfaces of the Tu-16 were retained with the airliner, but the new design adopted a wider, pressurised fuselage designed to accommodate 50 passengers. The prototype built in MMZ 'Opit' first flew on June 17, 1955, with Yu.L. Alasheyev at the controls. It was fitted with a drag parachute to shorten the landing distance by up to 400 m (1,300 ft), since at the time, not many airports had sufficiently long runways. The first serial TU-104 took off on 5 November 1955.

The Tu-104 was powered by two Mikulin AM-3 turbojets placed in the wing roots, like the Tu-16. The crew consisted of two pilots, a navigator (seated in the glazed "bomber" nose), a flight engineer, and a radio operator (later eliminated). The airplane raised great curiosity by its lavish "Victorian" interior – so-called by some Western observers – due to the materials used: mahogany, copper, and lace.

Tu-104 pilots were trained on the Ilyushin Il-28 bomber, followed by mail flights on an unarmed Tu-16 bomber painted in Aeroflot colors, between Moscow and Sverdlovsk. Pilots with previous Tu-16 experience transitioned into the Tu-104 with relative ease. The Tu-104 was considered difficult to fly, as it was heavy on controls and quite fast on final approach, and at low speeds displayed a tendency to stall, a feature common with highly swept wings. Experience with the Tu-104 led the Tupolev Design Bureau to develop the world's first turbofan series-built airliner, the Tupolev Tu-124, designed for local markets, and subsequently the Tu-134.

== Operational history ==
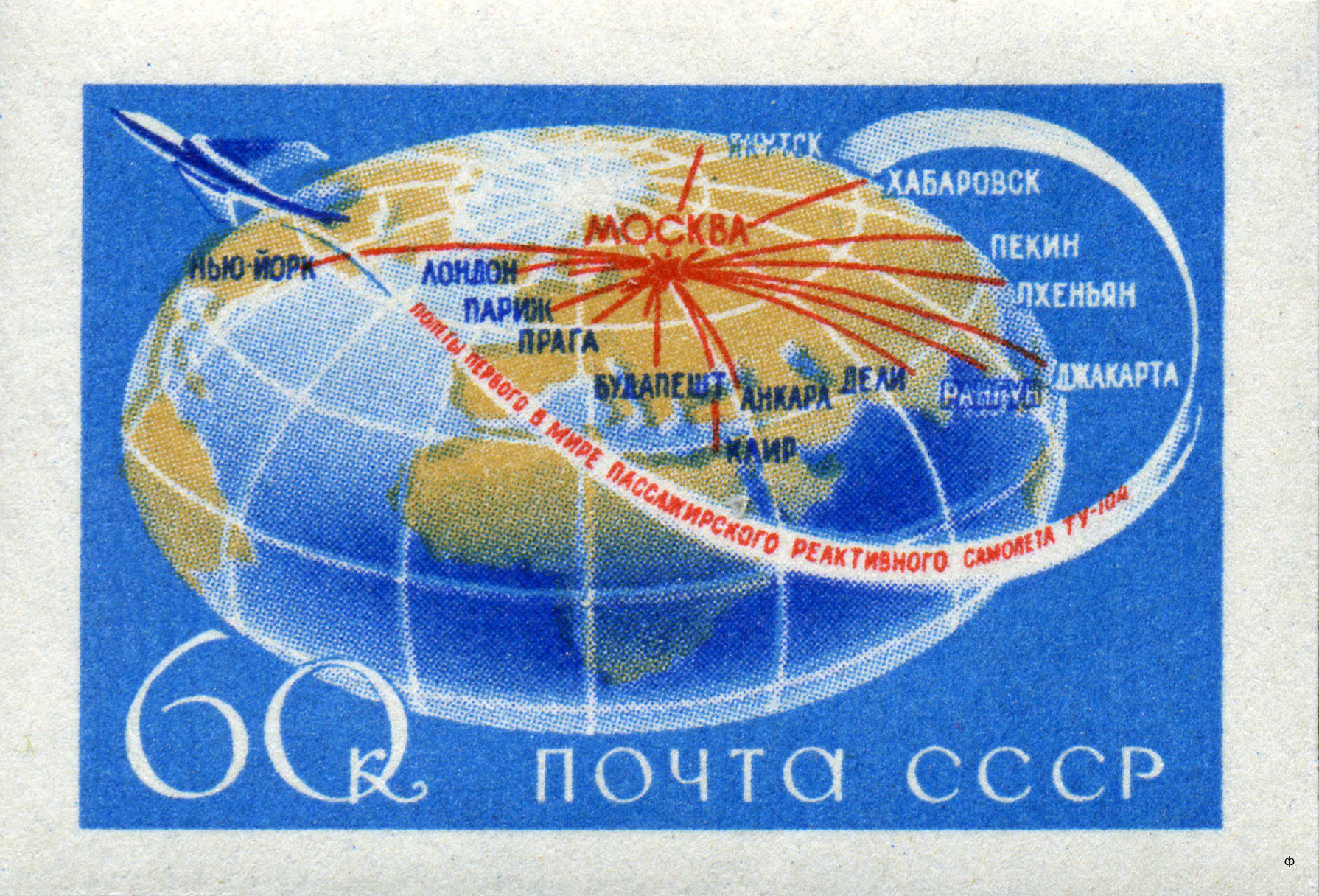
A 1958 Soviet stamp marking the Tu-104 as the world's first passenger jet liner, showing routes.

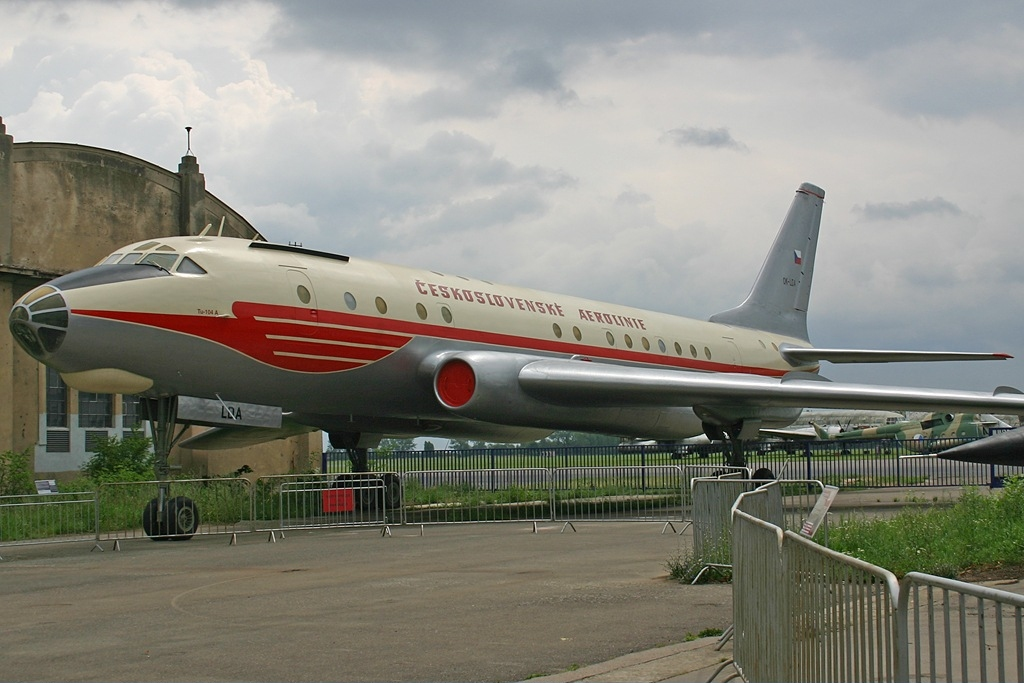
Czechoslovak Airlines Tu-104A at Kbely Aviation Museum, Prague.

On 15 September 1956, the Tu-104 began revenue service on Aeroflot's Moscow-Omsk-Irkutsk route, replacing the Ilyushin Il-14. The flight time was reduced from 13 hours and 50 minutes to 7 hours and 40 minutes, and the new jet dramatically increased the level of passenger comfort. By 1957, Aeroflot had placed the Tu-104 in service on routes from Vnukovo Airport in Moscow to London, Budapest, Copenhagen, Beijing, Brussels, Ottawa, Delhi, and Prague.

In 1957, ČSA Czechoslovak Airlines became the only export customer for the Tu-104, placing the aircraft on routes to Moscow, Paris, and Brussels. ČSA bought six Tu-104As (four new and two used aircraft) configured for 81 passengers. Three of these were subsequently written off (one due to a refueling incident in India and another to a pilot error without fatalities).

In 1959, a Tu-104 was leased to Sir Henry Lunn Ltd. (Lunn Poly) of London, who used the aircraft to transport holiday-makers to Russia with a 4.5-hour flight time.

Whilst the Tu-104 continued to be used by Aeroflot throughout the 1960s and 1970s, the safety record of the aircraft was poor in comparison to Western jetliners (16 of 96 aircraft were lost in accidents). The Tu-104 was unreliable, heavy, and very unstable with poor control response and an inclination to Dutch roll. Poor design aerodynamics of the wings resulted in a propensity to stall with little or no warning and a dangerous tendency to pitch up violently before stalling and entering an irrecoverable dive. Due to the fear of inadvertent stalls, aircrew flew approaches above the recommended approach speed, landing at 270–300 km/h (170–190 mph), nearly 50 km/h (31 mph) faster. At least two accidents were attributed to the pitch-up phenomenon, prompting changes to the design of the aircraft and operating procedures, but the problem remained. Aeroflot retired the Tu-104 from civilian service in March 1979 following a fatal accident at Moscow, but several aircraft were transferred to the Soviet military, which used them as staff transports and to train cosmonauts in zero gravity. After a military Tu-104 crash in February 1981 killed 50 people (17 were senior army and naval staff), the type was permanently removed from service. The last flight of the Tu-104 was a ferry flight to Ulyanovsk Aircraft Museum on 11 November 1986.

== Variants ==
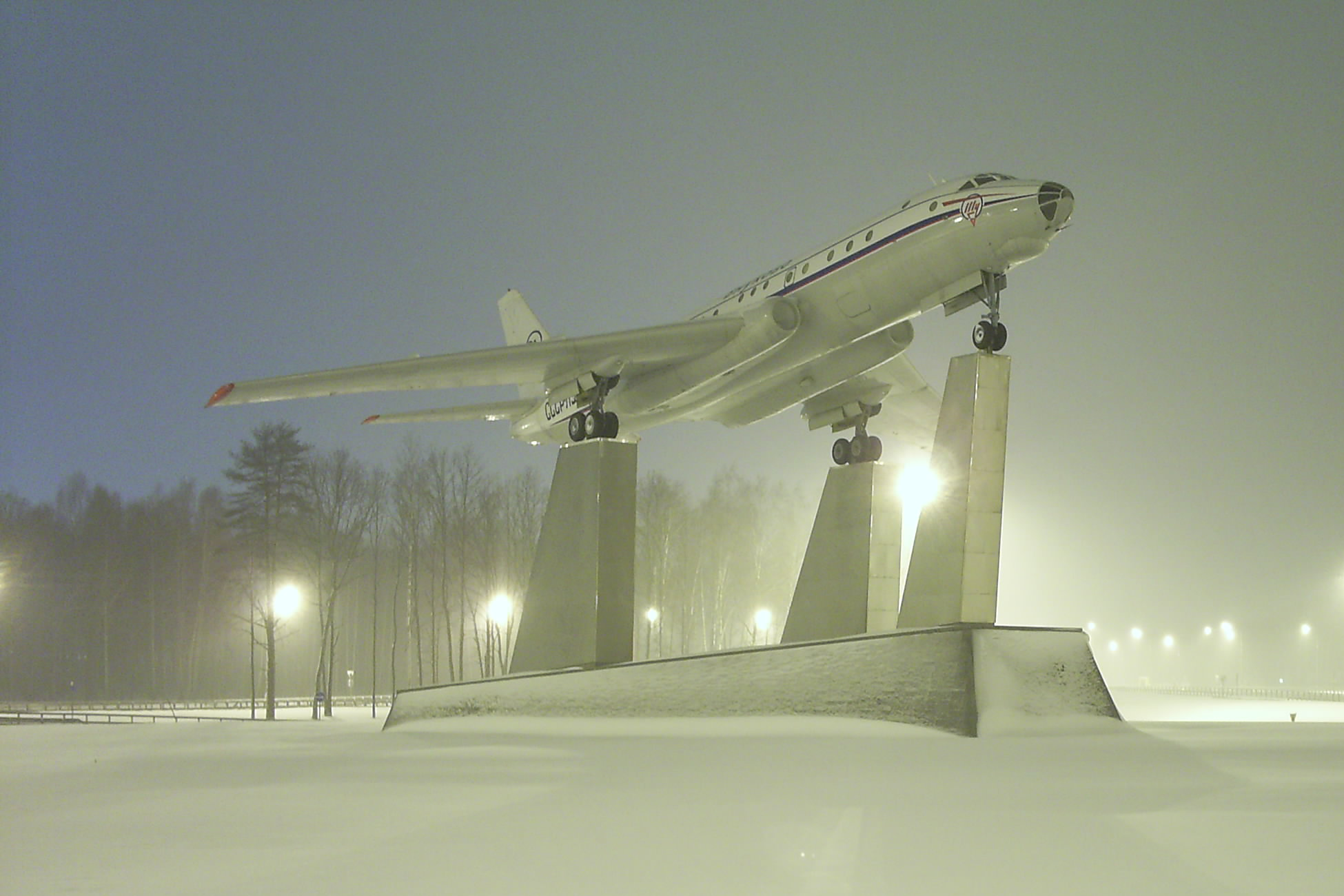
The Tu-104 near Vnukovo Airport

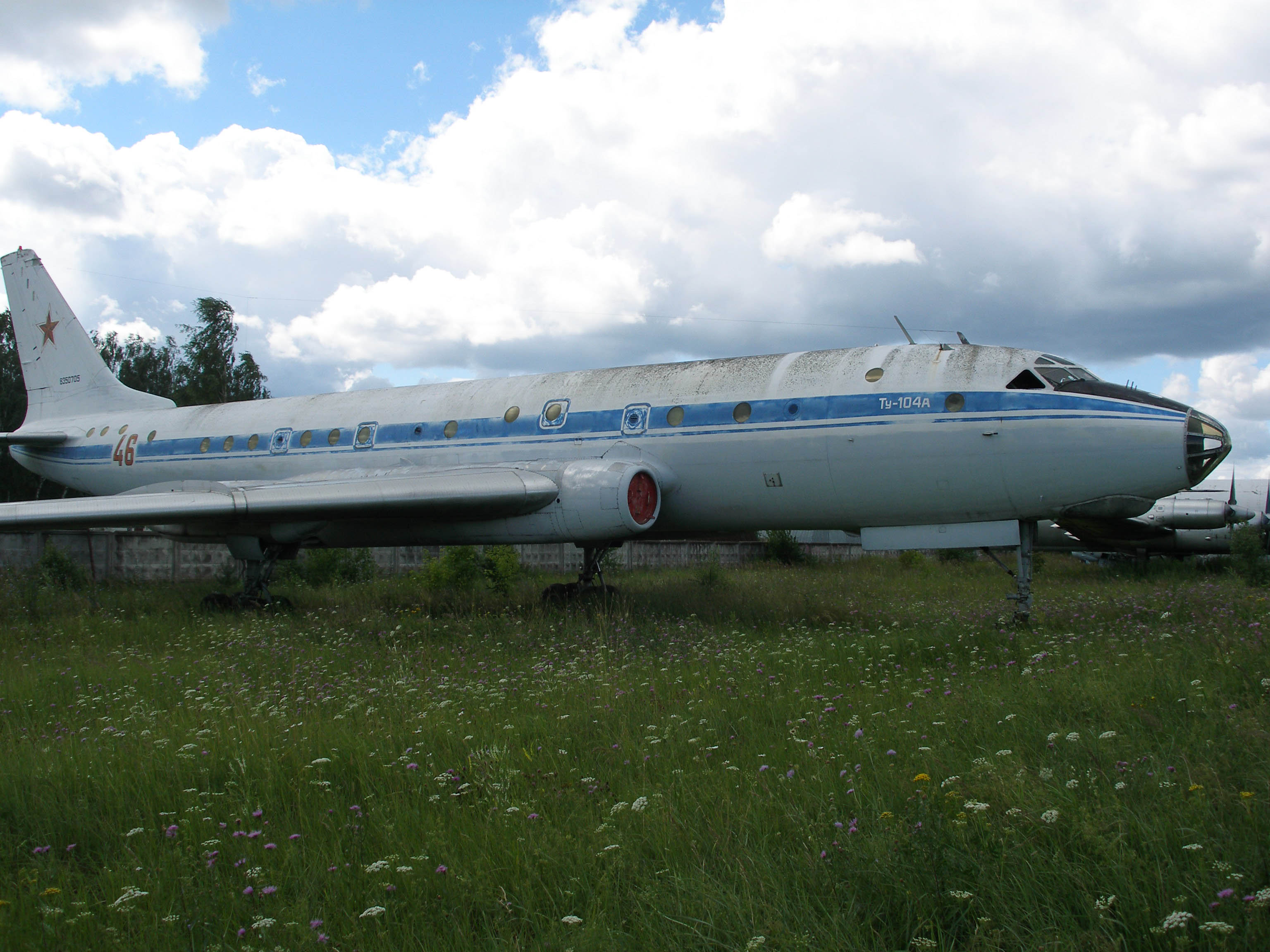
Тu-104 preserved at Monino museum: This aircraft was used to train cosmonauts.

Data from:

- Tu-104 – The initial version seating 50 passengers, it used two Mikulin AM-3 turbojet engines, each with 6,735 kilograms-force (66,050 N; 14,850 lb_{f}) of thrust; 29 airframes were built.
- Tu-104 2NK-8 – Projected version powered by two Kuznetsov NK-8 turbofan engines.
- Tu-104A – An improved version appearing in June 1957, its continued improvements of the Mikulin engines (Mikulin AM-3M each with 8,700 kilograms-force (85,000 N; 19,000 lb_{f}) of thrust) permitted significant growth in capacity, resulting in a 70-seater variant. The Tu-104A became the definitive production variant. On 6 September 1957, it flew with 20 t of payload at 11,211 metres (36,781 ft) above mean sea level. On 24 September 1957, it reached 970.8 km/h (603.2 mph) average speed with a 2-tonne payload. In total, 80 airframes were built, of which six were exported to Czechoslovakia.
- Tu-104AK – A zero-gravity trainer conversion of the Tu-104A for cosmonaut training.
- Tu-104A-TS – Five Tu-104As converted to troop transport/casualty evacuation aircraft.
- Tu-104B – Further improvements were made by stretching the fuselage 1.2 metres (3 ft 11 in) and fitting new Mikulin AM-3M-500 engines (9,700 kilograms-force (95,000 N; 21,000 lb_{f}) of thrust each). The Tu-104B was able to accommodate 100 passengers. This variant took advantage of the newer fuselage from the Tu-110 and the existing wings. It began revenue service with Aeroflot on 15 April 1959 on the Moscow-Saint Petersburg route; 95 airframes were built. Most were later rebuilt to Tu-104B-115 standard.
- Tu-104B-115 – Tu-104B airframes were rebuilt to accommodate 115 passengers, with new radio and navigational equipment.
- Tu-104B-TS – Six Tu-104Bs converted to troop transport/casualty evacuation aircraft.
- Tu-104 CSA - Six aircraft built for CSA.
- Tu-104D – This VIP version had two sleeper cabins forward and a 39-seat cabin aft.
- Tu-104D-85 – Tu-104A airframes rebuilt to accommodate 85 passengers.
- Tu-104D 3NK-8 – Projected version with three Kuznetsov NK-8 engines, new wings and a T-tail, precursor of Tu-154.
- Tu-104E – Experimental version powered by two Zubets RD-16-15 engines, giving better fuel economy and greater thrust. Two prototypes were converted from Tu-104Bs СССР-42441 and СССР-42443. The program was cancelled in the mid-1960s in favor of the Tu-154.
- Tu-104G – Version with a revised passenger cabin layout. Not to be confused with the so-called "Tu-104G", a de-militarized mailplane version of the Tu-16.
- Tu-104LL – Several serial numbers were converted for use in testing Tu-129 and Tu-22M electronics, and air-to-air missile systems (including launch).
- Tu-104Sh – Navigator trainer in two versions.
- Tu-104V – Tu-104B rebuilt to accommodate 117 passengers. Not built.
- Tu-107 – Prototype military transport version, with a rear loading ramp and a defensive turret armed with paired cannon. Although one aircraft was built, no production followed.
- Tu-110 – A four-engine version intended for export. A number of prototypes were built before the project was cancelled.
- Tu-118 – A projected turboprop version powered by four Kuznetsov TV-2F engines.
- Tu-124 – A separate development designed as a 75% scaled-down regional airliner based on the Tu-104. It featured major equipment upgrades, being a commercial airliner powered by fuel-efficient Soloviev D-20P turbofan engines. To support operations from shorter and unpaved airfields, it was equipped with low-pressure tires, double-slotted flaps, an automatic spoiler system, a center-section airbrake, and a rear-deploying drogue landing parachute.

== Former operators ==
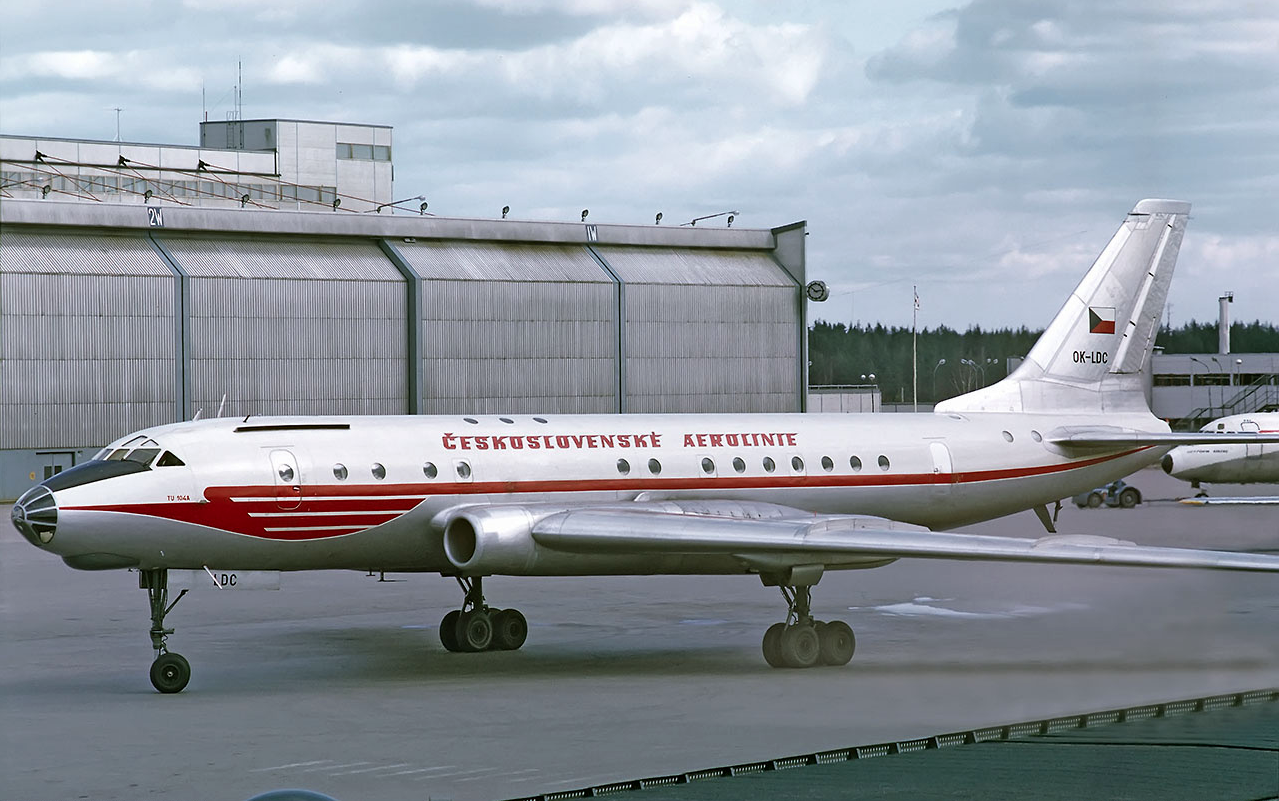
CSA Czechoslovak Airlines Tupolev Tu-104A at Arlanda Airport in 1971

Czechoslovakia

- CSA Czechoslovak Airlines – six aircraft
- Czechoslovak Air Force

Mongolia

- Military of Mongolia

Soviet Union

- Aeroflot
- Soviet Air Force

== Accidents and incidents ==
According to the American Flight Safety Foundation, between 1958 and 1981, 16 Tu-104s were lost in crashes out of 37 aircraft written off (hull loss rate = 18%) with a total of 1140 fatalities.

=== 1950s ===
19 February 1958
An Aeroflot Tu-104 (СССР-Л5414) was being ferried from Sverdlovsk (now Yekaterinburg) to Moscow when it force-landed short of the runway at Savasleika Air Base due to fuel exhaustion; all three crew survived.

15 August 1958
Aeroflot Flight 04, a Tu-104A (СССР-Л5442), stalled, spun down and crashed in the Khabarovsky District, Khabarovsk Krai after entering an updraft at 12,000 m (39,000 ft), killing all 64 on board in the first fatal accident involving the Tu-104. Later accidents showed that the Tu-104 was prone to losing longitudinal stability when flying in certain atmospheric conditions.

17 October 1958
An Aeroflot Tu-104A (СССР-42362) pitched up, entered a dive, spun down and crashed near Kanash after encountering turbulence and an updraft, killing all 80 on board. The aircraft was flying high-level diplomats of several Soviet-aligned countries to Moscow for an official event. In the wake of this accident, the Tu-104 was limited to 9,000 m (30,000 ft) and the stabilizers were redesigned.

=== 1960s ===
20 October 1960
Aeroflot Flight 05, a Tu-104A (СССР-42452), struck sloping terrain near Ust-Orda while attempting to climb following an aborted approach after the nosegear light malfunctioned, killing the 3 pilots of 68 on board.

1 February 1961
An Aeroflot Tu-104A (СССР-42357) overran the runway on landing at Vladivostok Airport after landing too late; no casualties.

16 March 1961
Aeroflot Flight 068, a Tu-104B (СССР-42438) force-landed on the frozen Nizhneisetsky pond near Koltsovo Airport following double engine failure, killing five of 51 on board. Shortly after takeoff, the right engine failed, causing severe vibration of the fuselage. Because of the vibration, the crew could not determine which engine failed as they could not read the instruments. A crew member pulled back the throttle for the left engine in an attempt to hear the difference in engine power to determine which engine failed, but the engine was shut down by mistake. A loss of altitude resulted, and a forced landing was carried out. The aircraft also struck a house near the pond, killing two. The engine failure was caused by a broken turbine blade in the second stage of the turbine section.

10 July 1961
Aeroflot Flight 381, a Tu-104B (СССР-42447), crashed at Odessa-Central Airport in bad weather after encountering downdrafts during the approach, killing one of 94 on board.

17 September 1961
An Aeroflot Tu-104A (СССР-42388) was written off following a hard landing at Tashkent Airport; no casualties.

2 November 1961
An Aeroflot Tu-104B (СССР-42504) force-landed in a field near Vladivostok Airport due to engine failure after striking a radio antenna during the approach; no casualties.

4 June 1962
An Aeroflot Tu-104B (СССР-42491) struck the side of Mount Baba (19 mi northeast of Vrazhdebna Airport) while attempting to return to Sofia following engine failure, killing the five crew.

30 June 1962
Aeroflot Flight 902, a Tu-104A (СССР-42370), was shot down by an errant anti-aircraft missile and crashed in the Beryozovsky District, killing all 84 on board. The missile was fired during an air defense exercise in the Magansk area, but it had lost its target in a storm front and hit the Tu-104 instead.

3 September 1962
Aeroflot Flight 03, a Tu-104A (СССР-42366), crashed in a swamp near Kuruna, Nanaysky District following an unexplained loss of control, killing all 86 on board; autopilot problems were blamed. An accidental shootdown was also theorized.

25 October 1962
An Aeroflot Tu-104B (СССР-42495) crashed shortly after takeoff from Sheremetyevo Airport during a post-maintenance test flight, killing all 11 on board. The rudder controls had been connected backwards.

18 May 1963
An Aeroflot Tu-104B (СССР-42483) stalled and crashed while on approach to Smolnoye Airport; no casualties.

13 July 1963
Aeroflot Flight 012, a Tu-104B (СССР-42492), crashed short of the runway at Irkutsk Airport following a sudden, sharp descent during the approach, killing 33 of 35 on board. Water had entered the pressure instrumentation static lines, causing incorrect readings on the airspeed indicator, vertical speed indicator and altimeter.

16 August 1963
A CSA Czechoslovak Airlines Tu-104A (OK-LDB) burned out during refueling at Santa Cruz Airport; one flight attendant was injured while jumping from the plane, but there were no other casualties.

9 June 1964
Aeroflot Flight 35, a Tu-104B (СССР-42476), landed hard at Tolmachevo Airport while attempting an overshoot; no casualties.

28 April 1969
An Aeroflot Tu-104B (СССР-42436) was written off after it landed 600 m (2,000 ft) short of the runway at Irkutsk Airport; no casualties.

=== 1970s ===
1 June 1970
A CSA Czechoslovak Airlines Tu-104A (OK-NDD) crashed short of runway 36 at Tripoli International Airport after two missed approaches to runway 18, killing all 13 on board.

25 July 1971
Aeroflot Flight 1912, a Tu-104B (СССР-42405), crashed following a hard landing short of the runway at Irkutsk Airport after the aircraft pitched up due to a too low approach speed, killing 97 of 126 on board. The speed indicator reading was affected by cabin pressurization and may have overstated the aircraft's speed.

10 October 1971
Aeroflot Flight 773, a Tu-104B (СССР-42490), exploded in mid-air and crashed near Baranovo, Naro-Fominsky District after a bomb placed in the cabin detonated, killing all 25 on board.

19 March 1972
An Aeroflot Tu-104B (СССР-42408) crashed after it struck a snow wall short of the runway at Omsk Airport during its fifth attempt to land; no casualties.

24 April 1973
Aeroflot Flight 2420, a Tu-104B (СССР-42505), was hijacked by a passenger who demanded to be flown to Stockholm, Sweden. The crew returned to Leningrad and while the landing gear was lowered the hijacker set off a bomb, killing himself and the flight engineer. Although the explosion blew a hole in the right side of the fuselage, the aircraft was able to land safely with no other casualties.

18 May 1973
Aeroflot Flight 109, a Tu-104A (СССР-42379), was hijacked by Chingis Yunusogly Rzayev and demanded to be flown to China. When Rzayev attempted to enter the cockpit he was shot by security officer Vladimir Yezikov. Though mortally wounded, Rzayev managed to detonate a bomb he had with him, consisting of 5.5–6 kg (12–13 lb) of TNT, blowing the aircraft out of the sky and it crashed in the Buryat ASSR, killing all 81 on board.

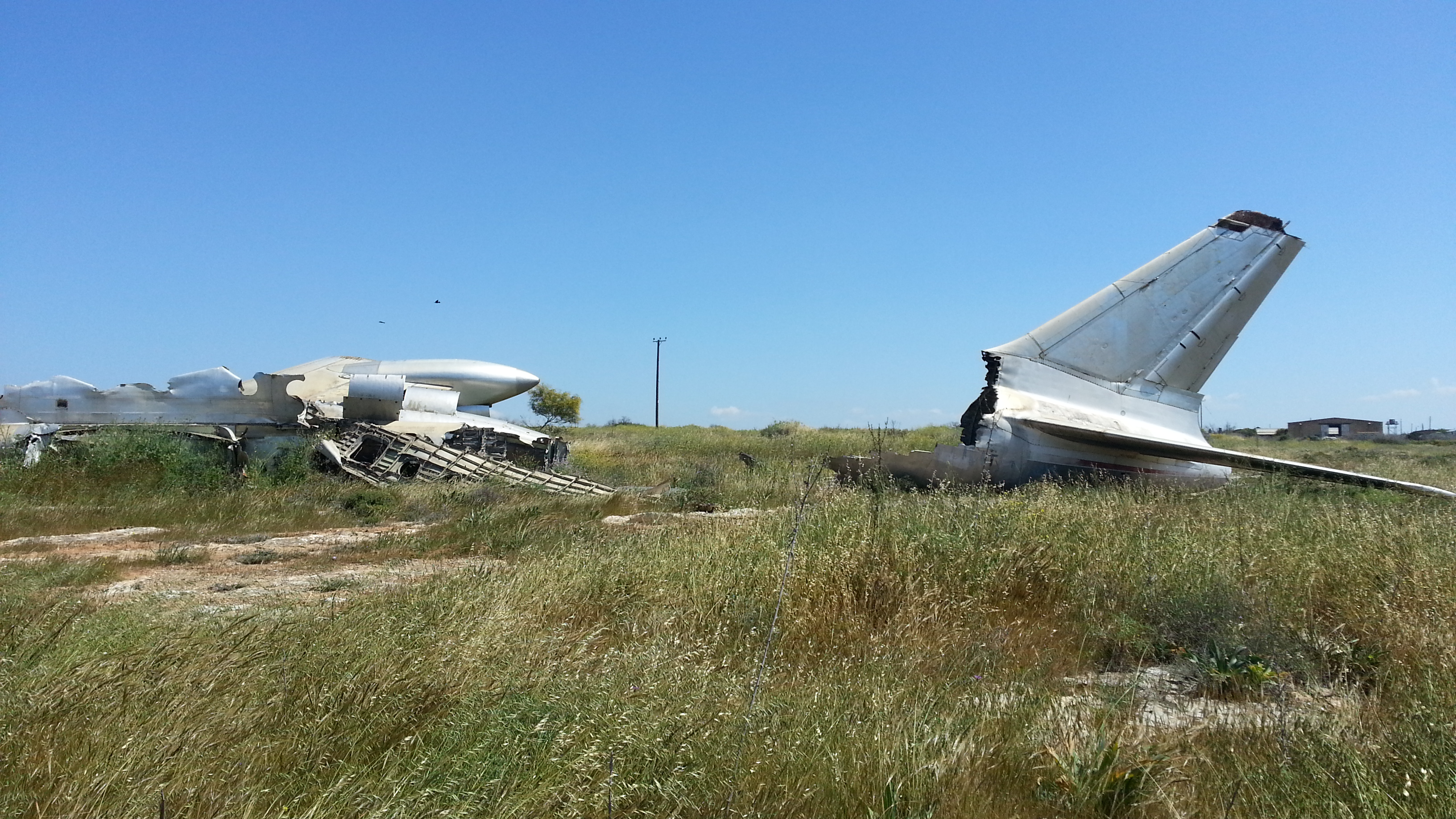
Wreckage of the Czechoslovak Airlines Tupolev Tu-104 (OK-MDE) near Nicosia airport (2015)

29 August 1973
CSA Flight 531, a Tu-104A (OK-MDE), veered off the runway on landing at Nicosia Airport after the pilot failed to stop the aircraft in time; all 70 on board survived. Wreckage remains at the crash site.

30 September 1973
Aeroflot Flight 3932, a Tu-104B (СССР-42506), crashed shortly after takeoff from Koltsovo Airport after the artificial horizons lost power, killing all 108 on board.

13 October 1973
Aeroflot Flight 964, a Tu-104B (СССР-42486), crashed 10 mi northwest of Domodedovo Airport after the compass and main gyroscopes lost power, killing all 122 in the deadliest accident involving the Tu-104.

7 December 1973
Aeroflot Flight 964, a Tu-104B (СССР-42503), crashed at Domodedovo Airport following a hard landing after the crew banked left to correct a right bank, killing 16 of 75 on board.

5 November 1974
An Aeroflot Tu-104B (СССР-42501) overran the runway on landing at Chita Airport and struck a railway embankment; no casualties.

30 August 1975
An Aeroflot Tu-104B (СССР-42472) landed hard at Tolmachevo Airport, breaking the right landing gear; no casualties.

9 February 1976
Aeroflot Flight 3739, a Tu-104A (СССР-42327), crashed on takeoff from Irkutsk Airport after entering a right bank due to pilot error, killing 24 of 119 on board. An Air Koryo (North Korea) Tu-154 (P-551) was damaged by debris from the Tu-104.

17 July 1976
An Aeroflot Tu-104A (СССР-42335) crashed on takeoff from Chita Airport after it hit a railway embankment after lifting off too slow and too low; all 117 on board survived. The aircraft was overloaded.

28 November 1976
Aeroflot Flight 2415, a Tu-104B (СССР-42471), crashed near Klushino, Solnechnogorsky District after the crew became disorientated following artificial horizon failure, killing all 73 on board.

1976
An Aeroflot Tu-104A (СССР-42371) crashed short of the runway at Borispol Airport after the engines were shut down in flight.

13 January 1977
Aeroflot Flight 3843, a Tu-104A (СССР-42369), crashed near Alma-Ata Airport due to loss of control following a fire in the left engine, killing all 90 on board.

17 March 1979
Aeroflot Flight 1691, a Tu-104B (СССР-42444), crashed while attempting to return to Moscow following a false fire alarm, killing 58 of 119 on board. The fire alarm was caused by mismatched parts in the engine. Following this accident, Aeroflot retired the Tu-104.

=== 1980s ===
7 February 1981
Soviet Navy Tu-104A СССР-42332 stalled and crashed on takeoff from Pushkin Airport due to improper loading and shifting cargo, killing all 50 on board, including 16 Soviet admirals. All remaining military Tu-104s were grounded following this accident.

=== Total deaths ===
From this listing of crashes due to mechanical or pilot error, the total number of deaths is 939, without the addition of the Borispol Airport 1976 incident. Shot down or bombed airplanes are not in the total.

== Aircraft on display ==
=== Czech Republic ===
- Tu-104A, registration OK-LDA, formerly operated by ČSA Czechoslovak Airlines, is preserved and on display at the Prague Aviation Museum, Kbely.
- Tu-104A, registration OK-LDC, formerly operated by ČSA Czechoslovak Airlines, is preserved and serves as an "Air-restaurant" in Petrovice, having been open to the public since 1999.
- Tu-104A, registration OK-NDF, is converted into a stylized restaurant and bar named "Letka" (Air bar) in Olomouc, located near a local sports park.

=== Russia ===
- Tu-104, registration L5415 (later CCCP-L5415), is preserved as a static exhibit at the Central Air Force Museum in Monino, near Moscow.
- Tu-104A, registration CCCP-42322, is on display at the Ulyanovsk Museum of Civil Aviation.
- Tu-104A, registration CCCP-42382, is preserved as an aircraft gate guard monument outside Tolmachevo Airport in Novosibirsk.
- Tu-104A, registration CCCP-42431, is preserved mounted on a high pedestal display as a prominent city square monument in Rybinsk, Yaroslavl Oblast.
- Tu-104B, registration CCCP-42507, is preserved as a gate-guard aircraft monument outside Vnukovo International Airport in Moscow.

=== Ukraine ===
- Tu-104A, registration CCCP-42329, is preserved and on display at the Ukraine State Aviation Museum in Kyiv.

== Specifications (Tu-104B) ==

Data from Tupolev Tu-104: Aeroflot's first jet,

General characteristics

- Crew: 7
- Capacity: 50–115 passengers
- Length: 40.06 m (131 ft 5 in)
- Wingspan: 34.54 m (113 ft 4 in)
- Height: 11.9 m (39 ft 1 in)
- Wing area: 183 m^{2} (1,970 sq ft) less LERX
- Airfoil: root: PR-1-10S-9 (15.7%); tip: PR-1-10S-9 (12%)
- Empty weight: 43,800 kg (96,562 lb)
- Gross weight: 78,100 kg (172,181 lb)
- Fuel capacity: 21,000 kg (46,297 lb) normal; 26,500 kg (58,422 lb) maximum
- Powerplant: 2 × Mikulin AM-3M-500 turbojet engines, 95 kN (21,400 lbf) thrust each

Performance

- Maximum speed: 950 km/h (590 mph, 510 kn)
- Cruising speed: 750–850 km/h (470–530 mph; 400–460 kn) at 10,000–12,000 m (32,808–39,370 ft)
- Range: 2,120 km (1,320 mi, 1,140 nmi) with 12,000 kg (26,455 lb) payload and 5,650 kg (12,456 lb) fuel reserve

2,750 km (1,709 mi) with 8,150 kg (17,968 lb) payload and 5,650 kg (12,456 lb) fuel reserve

- Service ceiling: 12,000 m (39,000 ft)
- Rate of climb: 10 m/s (2,000 ft/min)
- Take-off run at MTOW: 2,200 m (7,218 ft)
- Landing run at normal landing weight: 1,450–1,850 m (4,757–6,070 ft) without brake parachute

== See also ==
Related development

- Tupolev Tu-16
- Tupolev Tu-107
- Tupolev Tu-110
- Tupolev Tu-124

Aircraft of comparable role, configuration, and era

- de Havilland Comet
- Ilyushin Il-62

Related lists

- List of jet airliners
