= Flight 3 =

Flight 3 or Flight 03 may refer to the following aviation accidents or incidents:

- Avianca Flight 03, crashed on January 14, 1966
- Aeroflot Flight 3, a 1962 aviation accident
- TWA Flight 3, a 1942 DC-3 crash in Southern Nevada

== Other uses ==
- Starship flight test 3, a flight of the SpaceX Starship rocket in March 2024

== See also ==
- Flight (comics), volume 3
- Let 3, a Croatian modern rock band whose name translates to "Flight 3".
