= Flight 902 =

Flight 902 may refer to

- Aeroflot Flight 902, shot down on 30 June 1962
- Korean Air Lines Flight 902, shot down on 20 April 1978
