= Tupolev Tu-107 =

Soviet prototype transport aircraft

General information
- Type: Military jet transport aircraft
- National origin: Soviet Union
- Manufacturer: Tupolev OKB
- Number built: 1 (converted from Tu-104 c/n 76600302)

History
- First flight: 1958
- Developed from: Tupolev Tu-104

The Tupolev Tu-107 was a prototype Soviet military transport aircraft developed from the Tupolev Tu-104. It featured a rear ramp loading door and was intended to carry light vehicles, artillery pieces, or up to 70 paratroopers. The fuselage was unpressurized, which meant that passengers would have to use oxygen masks. A single prototype was built and flown, but the aircraft was not put in production.

== Specifications (Tu-107) ==
Data from Tupolev Tu-104

General characteristics

- Crew: 6
- Capacity: 70 paratroops or 10,000 kg (22,046.23 lb) – 15,000 kg (33,069.34 lb) payload
- Length: 38.58 m (126 ft 7 in)
- Wingspan: 34.54 m (113 ft 4 in)
- Height: 11.53 m (37 ft 10 in)
- Wing area: 174.48 m^{2} (1,878.1 sq ft)
- Powerplant: 2 × Mikulin RD-3M-500 Axial flow turbojet engines, 93.2 kN (21,000 lbf) thrust each

Performance

- Maximum speed: 950 km/h (590 mph, 510 kn)
- Cruise speed: 775 km/h (482 mph, 418 kn)
- Range: 3,300 km (2,100 mi, 1,800 nmi) with 10,000 kg (22,046.23 lb) payload, 775 km/h (481.56 mph) at 10,000 m (32,808.40 ft)
- Service ceiling: 11,750 m (38,550 ft)

Armament

- Guns:
- 2 x 23mm Afanasev Makarov AM-23 cannon in a DK-7T powered tail turret aimed via a TSP-1 television sighting system and PRS-2 Argon-2 gun ranging radar

Avionics

- PDSP-2S Proton-M tactical radio navigation system
- SRZO-2 Krom'Nikel IFF (Identification Friend or Foe)

== See also ==
Related development

- Tupolev Tu-16
- Tupolev Tu-104
- Tupolev Tu-110
