= Aeroflot Flight 03 =

1962 aviation accident

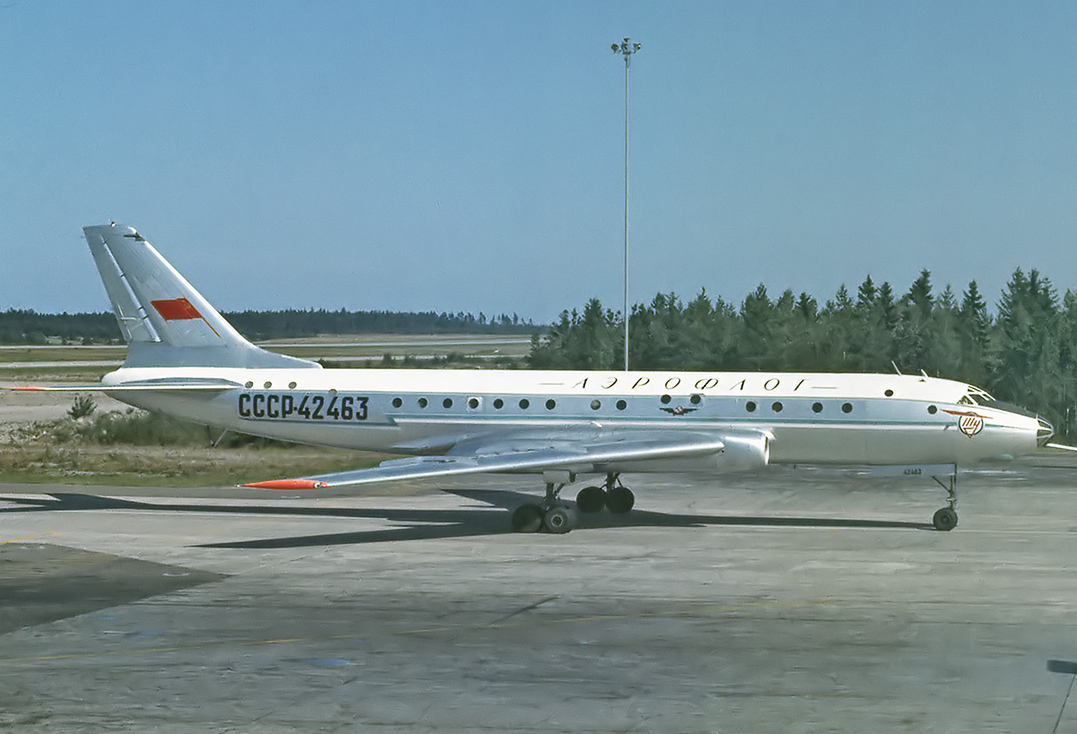
- An Aeroflot Tupolev Tu-104A, similar to the one involved in the accident

Accident
- Date: 3 September 1962
- Summary: Loss of control for reasons unknown
- Site: Near Kuruna, Nanaysky District

Aircraft
- Aircraft type: Tupolev Tu-104A
- Operator: Aeroflot
- Registration: CCCP-42366
- Flight origin: Vnukovo Airport, Moscow
- Stopover: Khabarovsk Novy Airport
- Destination: Petropavlovsk-Kamchatsky Airport
- Occupants: 86
- Passengers: 79
- Crew: 7
- Fatalities: 86
- Survivors: 0

Aeroflot Flight 03 was a passenger flight from Vnukovo Airport to Petropavlovsk-Kamchatsky Airport via Khabarovsk Airport. On 3 September 1962, the Tupolev Tu-104 flying this route lost control after the airframe started vibrating, resulting in the plane rolling and yawing several times at an altitude of 4,500 meters before crashing. The aircraft crashed into a swamp, some 90 kilometers away from Khabarovsk. At the time, it was the deadliest crash in the history of Soviet aviation.

== Aircraft ==
The aircraft involved in the accident was a Tupolev Tu-104A with two Mikulin AM-3M engines registered to Aeroflot as CCCP-42366. The aircraft was produced by the Omsk factory and was released to the Khabarovsk Far East Civil Aviation Directorate division of Aeroflot on 27 September 1958. The cabin of the aircraft had 70 seats; despite this 79 passengers were allowed on board. At the time of the accident, the aircraft had 4,426 flight hours and sustained 1,760 pressurization cycles.

== Passengers and crew ==
On board the aircraft were 79 passengers, of which 58 were adults and 21 were children. Seven crew members were also aboard the flight. The cockpit crew consisted of the following:

- Captain Petr Vasilievich Marsakov, serving as pilot in command
- Co-Pilot Viktor Mikhailovich Gritsenko
- Navigator Vasily Petrovich Zalavsky
- Flight Engineer Yuri Ivanovich Gusynin
- Radio operator Oleg Stepanovich Morozov
- Flight attendants Myla Filippovna Savenko and Evdokia Fedorovna Kozhaeva

== Description of accident ==
The aircraft was flying from Moscow to Petropavlovsk-Kamchatsky with a stopover in Khabarovsk. Mild stratocumulus clouds were present along the designated route. There was a 60-meter (200 ft) stratified cloud at Khabarovsk airport and visibility reached 20 kilometres (12 mi; 11 nmi), which were acceptable for the flight. Flight 03 departed Khabarovsk on 3 September at 04:32 local time (21:32 September 2 Moscow time). The air traffic controller instructed to follow the established corridor Troitskoe. At an altitude of 4,000 metres (13,000 ft) the aircraft ceased communications with Khabarovsk air traffic control, proceeding along the designated route. At 21:39 local time the pilot switched air traffic controllers, and after receiving permission started increasing the altitude to 8,000 metres (26,000 ft).

The aircraft started experiencing control difficulties at 4,500 meters, approximately 1 minute and 37 seconds after the last communications with air traffic control. The pilots expressed dismay at the sharp roll of the wings; captain Marsakov twice reported to air traffic control, "throw it away!" Followed by: "Shaking!" and "It's throwing us hard on the wing!". The aircraft disappeared from radar 36 seconds later. The crew of an Antonov An-10 (CCCP-11195), flying four minutes behind, reported seeing a red flash in the clouds, which gradually went out. At 04:42, the aircraft crashed into a swamp in the Nanaysky District, 15 kilometres (9.3 mi; 8.1 nmi) from the village of Kuruna. The impact formed a crater and scattered debris 200 by 70 by 80 metres (660 by 230 by 260 ft). All passengers and crew were killed in the crash.

== Cause ==
No official cause of the accident was discovered, but it was determined that the autopilot feature could have improved some aspects of control.

The commission responsible for investigating the accident concluded that:

"An emergency situation could be created by unintentional activation of the electric control with the elevator trimmer, as well as the trimmer aileron, although the latter is less dangerous than the inclusion of the elevator trimmer. As for the inadvertent loss of the rudder, the aircraft will still be flyable, although it will significantly complicate the piloting of the aircraft. If the elevator is turned off after turning on the autopilot, and the balance of the aircraft is maintained by the trim tabs, then an emergency situation may occur if the autopilot is turned off."

The civil commission was not allowed to review materials falling under the classification "Military Secret". This has led to some theories that the aircraft could have been accidentally shot down by a surface-to-air missile launched from the Litovko military base.

== See also ==
- Aeroflot Flight 902
