= Aeroflot Flight 2420 =

1973 aircraft hijacking

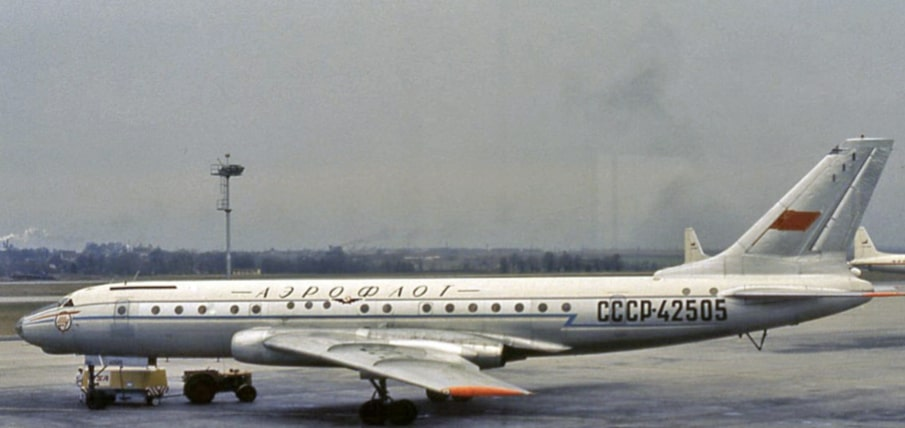
- СССР-42505, the aircraft involved in the hijacking

Hijacking
- Date: April 23, 1973
- Summary: Hijacking
- Site: Shosseynaya Airport, Leningrad, Soviet Union

Aircraft
- Aircraft type: Tupolev Tu-104B
- Operator: Aeroflot
- Registration: СССР-42505
- Flight origin: Shosseynaya Airport
- Destination: Sheremetyevo International Airport
- Occupants: 57
- Passengers: 51
- Crew: 6
- Fatalities: 2
- Survivors: 55

Aeroflot Flight 2420 was a passenger flight from Leningrad-Shosseynaya Airport to Moscow-Sheremetyevo that, on April 23, 1973, was hijacked by a passenger demanding to go to Stockholm, Sweden. The crew were returning the aircraft to Leningrad when the hijacker detonated the bomb, killing himself and the flight mechanic, who had left the cockpit to negotiate with the hijacker.

== Aircraft ==
The accident aircraft was a Tupolev Tu-104B, registration СССР-42505, manufactured in 1960 by Kazan Aviation Factory No.22. Two Mikulin AM-3M-500 engines powered the plane. By the time of the accident, it had logged 17,095 flight hours and 10,698 pressurisation cycles.

== Hijacking ==
The crew members consisted of: V. M. Yanchenko (pilot-in-command), V. M. Krivulin (co-pilot), N. F. Shirokov (navigator), V. G. Gryaznov (flight mechanic), L. Eremin; M. Khokhreva (flight attendants).

The aircraft took off at 14:25 with 50 adults and one child on board. The crew reported an altitude of 7,800 m (25,600 ft) at 14:38. Shortly afterwards, a passenger gave a flight attendant a letter and requested that it be handed over to the crew. Pilot-in-command (PIC) Yanchenko ordered the flight mechanic, Gryaznov, to leave the cockpit.

The text of the letter read:

Five minutes to read! To the commander and the crew of the aircraft: Dear pilots! I ask you to direct the plane to Sweden, Stockholm Airport. A correct understanding of my request will save your life and mine, and those, through their atrocities, forced me to do this act will be held accountable for this. After a safe landing, I may return to my homeland after a personal conversation with representatives of the highest authorities of the USSR. You see a weapon in my hands. This contains 2 kg 100 g of explosives used in mines, so you don't need to explain what this charge means. Therefore, do not circumvent my request with provocation. Remember that any risk will result in a plane crash. Convince yourself firmly for this, because everything has been calculated and taken into account.

The hijacker, a previously convicted 47-year-old man from the Ukrainian SSR named Ivan Bidyuk, carried a pistol and a hand grenade. Yanchenko had a pistol for last resort but could not shoot Bidyuk as he had a bomb. He was also ordered to "take all measures to prevent the hijacking". While the crew were discussing the situation in the flight deck, the hijacker entered with a bomb in his hands. The pilots turned on the "distress" signal and contacted air traffic control. Earlier, the navigator and flight mechanic went out to neutralise the criminal; but later the navigator returned. Gryaznov, the flight mechanic, stayed outside to convince Bidyuk of his actions.

The plane could not land at Helsinki due to the low fuel remaining. The hijacker demanded that the plane fly to Stockholm, but the PIC did not receive permission from Leningrad ATC to fly to Sweden. PIC Yanchenko decided to land at Leningrad. At an altitude of 120–140 m (390–460 ft), the landing gears were lowered, but the hijacker realised Flight 2420 was landing at Leningrad and detonated the explosives. The aircraft landed 30 seconds after the explosion. The nose gear collapsed and the Tu-104 slid before stopping. The explosion killed Gryaznov and the hijacker.

== Aftermath ==
The crew members were awarded the following awards for their action during the hijacking:

- Pilot-in-command V. M. Yanchenko — Order of Lenin and Gold Star of the Hero of the Soviet Union
- Flight mechanic V. G. Gryaznov — Hero of the Soviet Union (posthumously)
- Co-pilot V. M. Krivulin — Order of the Red Banner
- Navigator N. F. Shirokov — Order of the Red Banner
- Flight attendants L. Eremina and M. Khokhreva — Order of the Red Star

A public garden in Aviagorodok (St. Petersburg) is named after Gryaznov.

== See also ==
- List of aircraft hijackings
- Aeroflot accidents and incidents in the 1970s
