= Flight 4 =

Flight 4 or Flight 004 may refer to the following aviation accidents or incidents:

- Aeroflot Flight 4, crashed on 15 August 1958
- Lauda Air Flight 004, crashed on 26 May 1991

== Other uses ==
- Starship flight test 4, the first fully successful flight of the SpaceX Starship rocket in June 2024
