= Aeroflot Flight 3739 =

Aeroflot Flight 3739 may refer to two aviation accidents:

- Aeroflot Flight 3739 (1976), crashed on takeoff, 24 deaths
- Aeroflot Flight 3739 (1988), hijacked by the Ovechkin family, 9 deaths
