= Aeroflot Flight 3843 =

1977 aviation accident

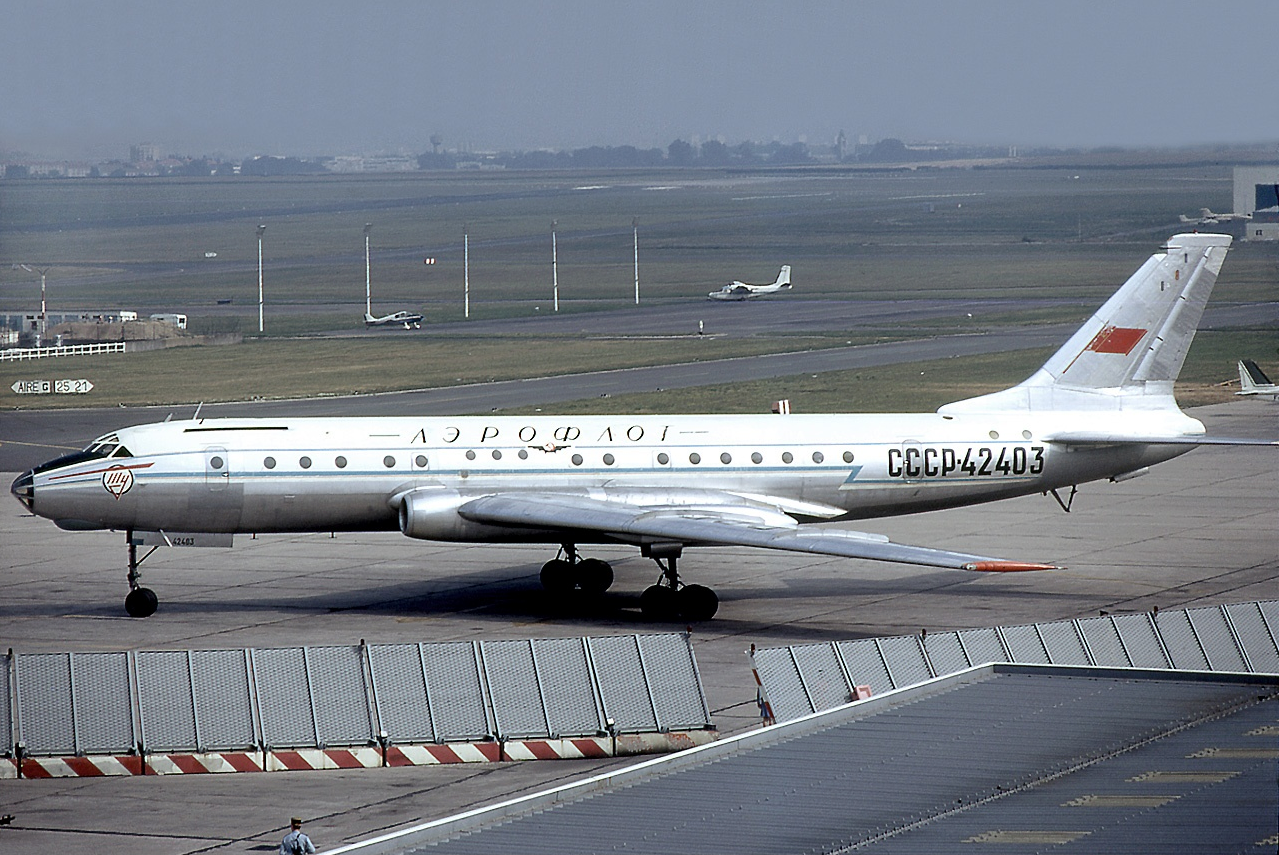
- A Tupolev Tu-104B, similar to the aircraft involved in the accident.

Accident
- Date: 13 January 1977
- Summary: Left engine fire leading to a loss of flight controls
- Site: Near Alma-Ata Airport, Kazakhstan; 43°22′35″N 77°6′10″E

Aircraft
- Aircraft type: Tupolev Tu-104A
- Operator: Aeroflot
- Registration: CCCP-42369
- Flight origin: Khabarovsk Airport
- Stopover: Novosibirsk
- Destination: Alma-Ata Airport
- Occupants: 90
- Passengers: 82
- Crew: 8
- Fatalities: 90
- Survivors: 0

Aeroflot Flight 3843 was a Soviet Union commercial flight that crashed on January 13, 1977, after a left engine fire near Alma-Ata Airport. All 90 people on board perished in the crash.

A team of youth hockey players, who were scheduled to be on the flight, did not board the flight because of the postponement of a competition.

== Aircraft and crew ==
The aircraft involved in the accident was a Tupolev Tu-104A, registered CCCP-42369 to Aeroflot. The aircraft was delivered to Aeroflot on October 31, 1958. At the time of the accident, the aircraft had accumulated 27,189 flight hours and 12,819 landings in service.

The flight crew consisted of captain Dmitry Danilovich Afanasyev, first officer Vladimir Ivanovich Baburin, navigators Alexander Vasilievich Klimakhin and Anatoly Viktorovich Rozhkovsky, and flight engineer Anatoly Mikhailovich Shaforost; three flight attendants (Leonid Ivanovich Korytko, Alla Valentinovna Gryaznova, and Maria Petrovna Faraponova) were stationed in the cabin.

== Accident sequence ==
Flight 3843 was a service from Khabarovsk to Almaty via Novosibirsk. The aircraft departed for the second leg of its flight from Novosibirsk at 17:13 on January 13, 1977. At 40 kilometres (25 mi; 22 nmi) from Almaty airport the aircraft was at an altitude of 2,100 metres (6,890 ft). Witnesses noticed the left engine of the aircraft on fire about 15 kilometres (9 mi; 8 nmi) from the airport. With the wing still on fire, it then climbed from about 180 metres (600 ft) to 300 metres (1,000 ft) before diving and exploding in a snow-covered field. The sky above the airport at the time was clear, although due to the haze visibility was at 1,850 metres (2,023 yd). The aircraft hit the ground at an angle of 28° with a roll, at a speed of 150–190 kilometres per hour (93–118 mph) and rotated 200-210° with respect to the runway axis. The fuselage broke in two; the front part of the fuselage sank into the ground 2 metres (10 ft). The rear of the fuselage with the tail assembly was pushed back 18 metres (60 ft) and not burned in the fire. Forensic examinations showed that the passengers were exposed to carbon monoxide during the flight.

The plane hit the ground with enough force that the bodies of the victims could not be identified.

== Investigation ==
The accident board found the aircraft's left engine had been subjected to fire for 10–15 minutes. The fire increased upon slowing down to land due to a decrease in the air flow, damaging the controls. The aircraft stalled and crashed three kilometers short of the airport.
