= Tupolev Tu-110 =

Prototype airliner in the USSR

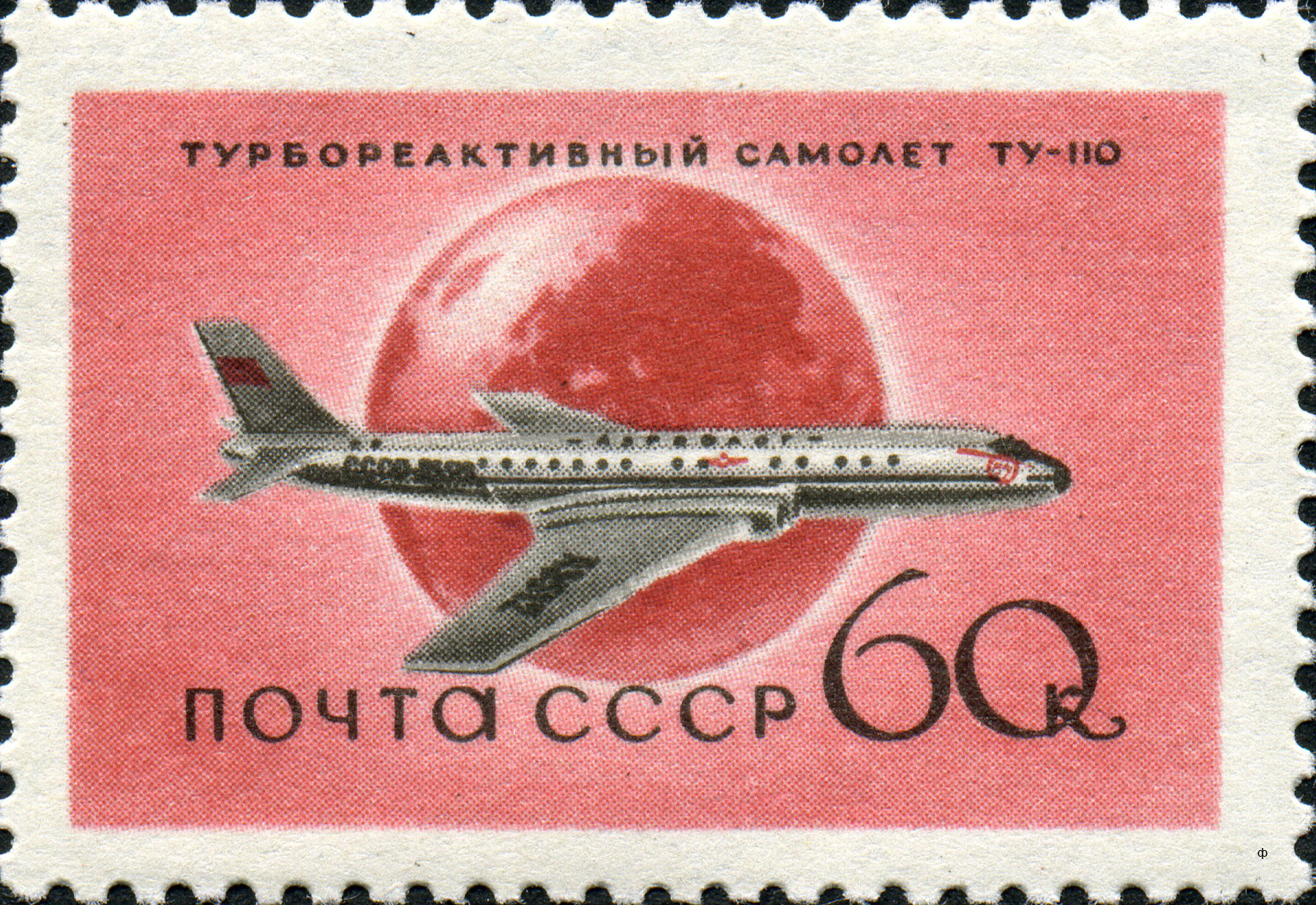
- Tu-110 on a 1958 Soviet postage stamp

General information
- Type: Jet airliner
- National origin: USSR
- Manufacturer: Tupolev
- Designer: Dmitriy S. Markov
- Status: Never entered service
- Number built: 4

History
- First flight: 11 March 1957
- Developed from: Tupolev Tu-104

The Tupolev Tu-110 (NATO reporting name: Cooker) was a jet airliner designed and built in the USSR, which had its maiden flight in 1957. It was a four-engined development of the Tu-104, but only four were built, and it never saw airline service.

== Design and development ==
Realising that the export potential for the Tupolev Tu-104 was limited, the Council of Ministers issued directive No. 1511–846 on 12 August 1956, requiring the Tupolev Design Bureau to develop a four-engined version of the Tu-104, to enable the aircraft to safely cross large expanses of ocean, and improve safety on takeoff in case of engine failure.

The Tu-110 was a major redesign of the Tu-104, powered by four Lyulka AL-7 turbojets rated at 5,500 kgf (53.9 kN; 12,100 lbf) thrust each, with two staggered engines in the root of each extended centre-section. The first prototype was flown on 11 March 1957.

Production of the Tu-110 was authorised at the Kazan Aircraft Factory, with an initial order for ten aircraft, but only three aircraft were completed before the programme was terminated. The production aircraft featured extended-chord wings and enlarged baggage holds, as well as seating for up to 100 passengers in an all-tourist class seating arrangement.

All four aircraft were converted to Tu-110Bs with Soloviev D-20 turbofan engines, in an attempt to improve the performance of the aircraft, but to no avail. No further orders were forthcoming and the four Tu-110Bs were used for experimental work on avionics, missile systems and boundary layer control systems, remaining active into the 1970s.

== Variants ==
External images
- Tupolev Tu-110 at Vnukovo International Airport
- There was once a Tu-110 used for instructional and display purposes on the grassland near Kyiv International Airport.

Data from Tupolev Tu-104

- Tu-110 – The sole prototype of the Tu-110 (CCCP-L5600).
- Tu-110A – Production aircraft with doubled seating capacity (all economy class), increased capacity baggage holds, increased area flaps and increased MTOW of 87,200 kg (182,320 lb). Three aircraft were built (CCCP-L5511 – L5513)
- Tu-110B – Experimental medium-haul versions converted from the prototype and three production aircraft, fitted with four Soloviev D-20 turbofan engines.
- Tu-110L – The prototype aircraft modified with boundary layer control supplied with bleed air from the D-20 turbofan engines.
- Tu-110D – A projected medium-haul airliner with four D-20 engines in paired nacelles on either side of the rear fuselage,
- Tu-117 – A projected military transport version with a rear fuselage loading ramp and defensive tail turret.

== Specifications (Tu-110 1st prototype) ==
Data from The Osprey Encyclopaedia of Russian Aircraft 1875– 1995

General characteristics

- Crew: five (flight crew)
- Capacity: 100 passengers
- Length: 38.30 m (125 ft 8 in)
- Wingspan: 37.50 m (123 ft 0 in)
- Wing area: 182 m^{2} (1,960 sq ft)
- Empty weight: 44,250 kg (97,555 lb)
- Max takeoff weight: 79,300 kg (174,827 lb)
- Powerplant: 4 × Lyulka AL-7 turbojet, 64 kN (14,300 lbf) thrust each

Performance

- Maximum speed: 1,000 km/h (620 mph, 540 kn)
- Cruise speed: 890 km/h (550 mph, 480 kn)
- Range: 3,450 km (2,140 mi, 1,860 nmi)
- Service ceiling: 12,000 m (39,000 ft)

== See also ==
Related development

- Tupolev Tu-16
- Tupolev Tu-104
- Tupolev Tu-107
- Tupolev Tu-124

Related lists

- List of jet airliners
