= Aeroflot Flight 1691 =

1979 aviation accident

Coordinates: 53°36′2″N 37°18′32″E

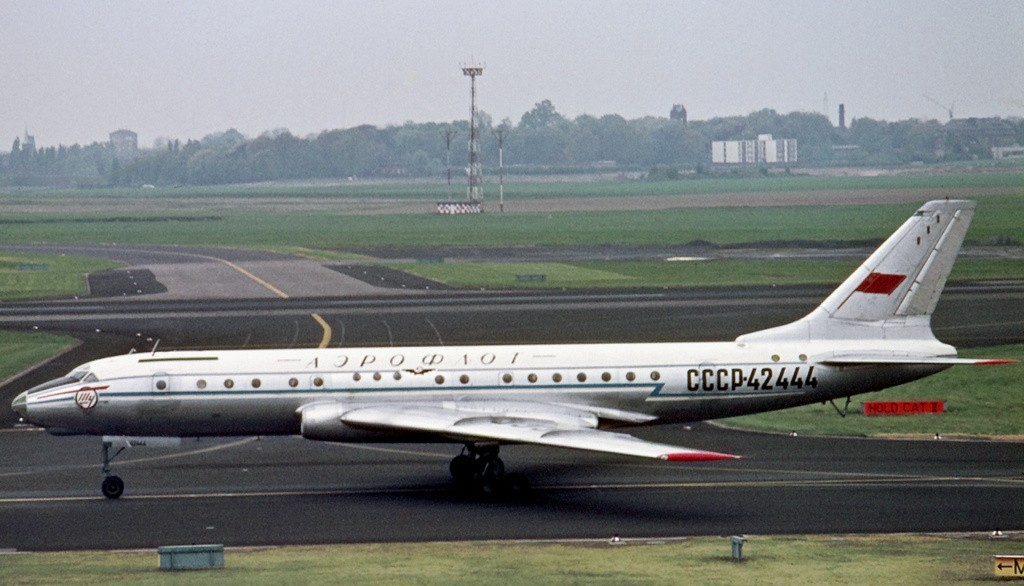
- CCCP-42444, the aircraft involved, photographed in April 1974

Accident
- Date: 17 March 1979
- Summary: Crashed while attempting to return to airport
- Site: Near Vnukovo Airport, Moscow, Soviet Union

Aircraft
- Aircraft type: Tupolev Tu-104B
- Operator: Aeroflot (Odessa UAD of Ukrainian ACA)
- Registration: CCCP-42444
- Flight origin: Moscow Vnukovo International Airport
- Destination: Odessa Central Airport
- Occupants: 119
- Passengers: 113
- Crew: 6
- Fatalities: 58 (57 passengers, 1 crew)
- Survivors: 61

Aeroflot Flight 1691 crashed near Moscow Vnukovo Airport on 17 March 1979 killing 58 of the 119 people on board. The Tupolev Tu-104B operating the flight was overloaded and the crew received a false fire alarm.

== Accident sequence ==
Flight 1691 was due to leave for Odessa at 8:15 local time, but was delayed due to adverse weather conditions at both Odessa and Vnukovo. The Tupolev eventually took off at 19:32 local time. Five seconds after liftoff, the left engine fire alarm sounded in the cockpit. The plane continued climbing, and conducted a series of four turns back towards Vnukovo. The flaps were then deflected by 20 degrees. It then entered the glideslope at 360m and was 50m left of the runway centerline. The aircraft descended rapidly and 2.5 seconds before first impact, the crew moved the throttles to takeoff thrust and left them there, but this did nothing to save the aircraft. The first collision was the left main landing gear with some cables on a road near Vnukovo. The aircraft collided with the ground 1548 metres from the runway threshold. The left engine was torn from the aircraft as it rolled over and a fire broke out. 57 passengers and one stewardess were killed.

== Investigation ==
The board found that the plane was overloaded. Other factors included the lack of communication between the crew and the false fire alarm caused by a mismatch of parts in the engine.

== Consequences ==
As a result of the accident, Ministry of Civil Aviation made a decision to retire all Tu-104 aircraft from civil service in November 1979.
