= Aeroflot Flight 04 =

1958 aviation accident in the Soviet Union

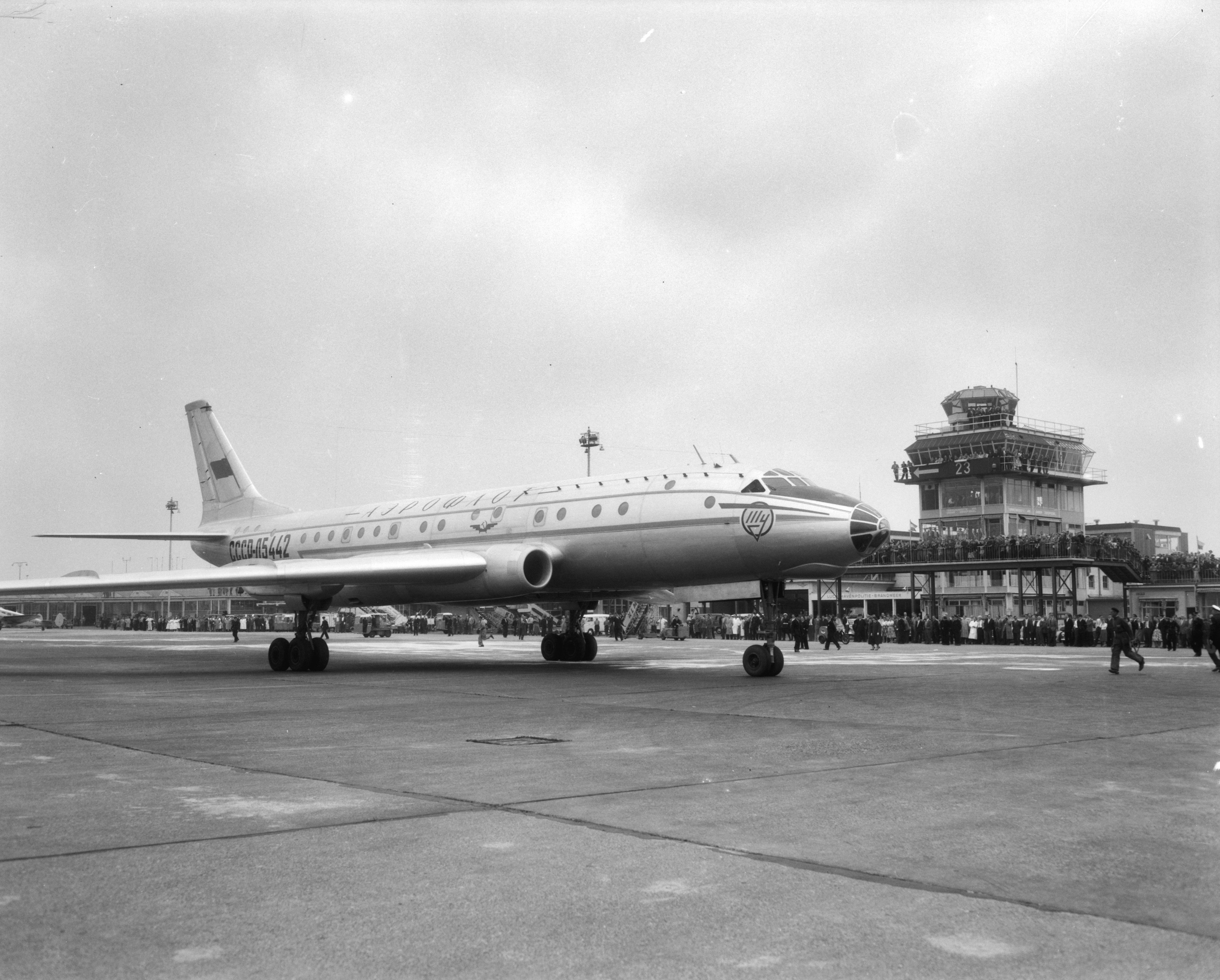
- СССР-Л5442, the aircraft involved in the accident, in July 1958

Accident
- Date: 15 August 1958
- Summary: Stalled due to engine flameout, spatial disorientation and instrument failure
- Site: Khabarovsky District, Khabarovsk Krai, Soviet Union; 49°48′N 132°57′E

Aircraft
- Aircraft type: Tupolev Tu-104A
- Operator: Aeroflot
- Registration: СССР-Л5442
- Flight origin: Khabarovsk Novy Airport, Khabarovsk
- Stopover: Irkutsk Airport, Irkutsk
- Destination: Vnukovo Airport, Moscow
- Occupants: 64
- Passengers: 54
- Crew: 10
- Fatalities: 64
- Survivors: 0

Aeroflot Flight 04 was a scheduled domestic passenger flight from Khabarovsk to Moscow with a stopover in Irkutsk, that crashed on 15 August 1958, killing all 64 passengers and crew aboard the aircraft. It was the first fatal accident involving a Tupolev Tu-104.

== Aircraft ==
The aircraft involved in the accident was a Tupolev Tu-104A equipped with two Mikulin AM-3M engines registered as CCCP-L5442 (Russian: СССР-Л5442) to the Moscow Civil Aviation Directorate of Aeroflot, the national flag carrier. At the time of the accident, the aircraft had completed 1041 flight hours and 401 pressurization cycles. The aircraft was re-registered to CCCP-42349 on 9 May 1958, but this was not taken up before the crash.

== Synopsis ==
The weather forecast received by the crew for the Khabarovsk-Irkutsk route stated that cumulonimbus and stratiform clouds were present between altitudes of 300–600 meters at Khabarovsk airport, and thunderstorms with rain were present in the Birobidzhan - Magdagachi area. Visibility ranged from 4 to 10 kilometers. The departure from Khabarovsk airport was delayed by 3 hours and 35 minutes due to poor weather, with the passengers and crew not boarding the aircraft until 21:45 local time (14:45 Moscow time).

At 21:50 Flight 04 was instructed to maintain flight at an altitude of 9,000 m (30,000 ft). After flying 150 km (93 mi) en route, the flight encountered towering cumulus clouds with tops too high to safely fly above them. After receiving permission from the controller the crew avoided the clouds before changing altitude as directed by the air traffic controller. While at an altitude of 8,600 m (28,200 ft), the crew requested permission to increase altitude to avoid more cumulus clouds. The air traffic controller gave the flight permission to fly at 11,000 m (36,000 ft) until passing Arkhara where it was to decrease altitude to 9,000 m (30,000 ft). At 11,000 m (36,000 ft) the clouds were still present so the flight was given permission to climb to 12,000 m (39,000 ft). At 22:12 the flight reported passing an altitude of 11,600 m (38,100 ft) and that stars were visible.

At 22:14 the captain reported reaching the altitude of 12,000 m (39,000 ft). The flight crew stated they saw intense cumulus clouds ahead and would return to Khabarovsk if they could not avoid the clouds. At 22:18 the controller contacted Flight 4 but an agitated voice only replied "one minute, one minute". The second attempt at communications at 22:19 was met with the same response, but Flight 4 did not respond to any later calls. Sometime between 22:20 and 22:25 the aircraft crashed into a dense forest 215 km (134 mi) northwest of Khabarovsk airport, impacting the ground at an angle of 60°, leaving a 450 m (1,480 ft) wide debris field. All 64 people on board were killed in the crash.

== Investigation ==
Investigation showed that the aircraft remained intact until it crashed into the forest, ruling out a decompression. Two Tupolev Tu-16 bombers flying approximately 150–200 km (93–124 mi) north of the route of flight 4 between 11,000 and 12,000 m (36,000 and 39,000 ft) reported the presence of strong updrafts within cumulonimbus clouds. The weight of the Tu-104 at takeoff was 66 tons, which limited the maximum safe altitude for flight to be 11,700 m (38,400 ft) at standard engine power; altitudes of 12,000 m (39,000 ft) could only be safely achieved by the Tu-104 in calm weather. Weather conditions in the Birobidzhan - Arkhara - Magdagachi region were more complex than the description received by the crew described, with cumulonimbus clouds reaching altitudes of over 12,000 m (39,000 ft). In attempts to avoid the clouds the airliner increased altitude to levels unsafe for the aircraft at the current weight, and combined with the updrafts present in the clouds, the aircraft stalled, during which the engines flamed out and the landing gear was extended. The failure of the engines and disorientation of the crew, from accompanied failure of the artificial horizons, rendered recovery nearly impossible.

Secondary causes of the accident were cited as follows:

1. Failure of the air traffic controllers and the pilot in command to thoroughly analyze weather conditions at the time, causing the flight to fly into dangerous weather in violation of the flight manual.
2. The three hour and 35 minutes delay of the departure of the flight from Khabarovsk, during which weather conditions deteriorated considerably.
3. Insufficient preparation for departure on part of the navigators.
4. The weather forecast provided to the flight crew did not specify the maximum altitude of the clouds.
5. There were no clear indicators for the maximum safe altitude of the Tu-104 with the given takeoff weight.
6. There were no defined procedures in place in the event of a stall.

Later accidents demonstrated that when a Tu-104 flew in certain atmospheric conditions, both clear weather and near thunderstorms, the aircraft was prone to losing longitudinal stability, that could be followed by the landing gear dropping, engine failure, and artificial horizon failure. At the time, the issues with the Tu-104's high stall speed facilitated by weak mechanization of the wing and the other mechanical issues mentioned were not well known.
