= Aeroflot Flight 773 =

1971 airliner bombing

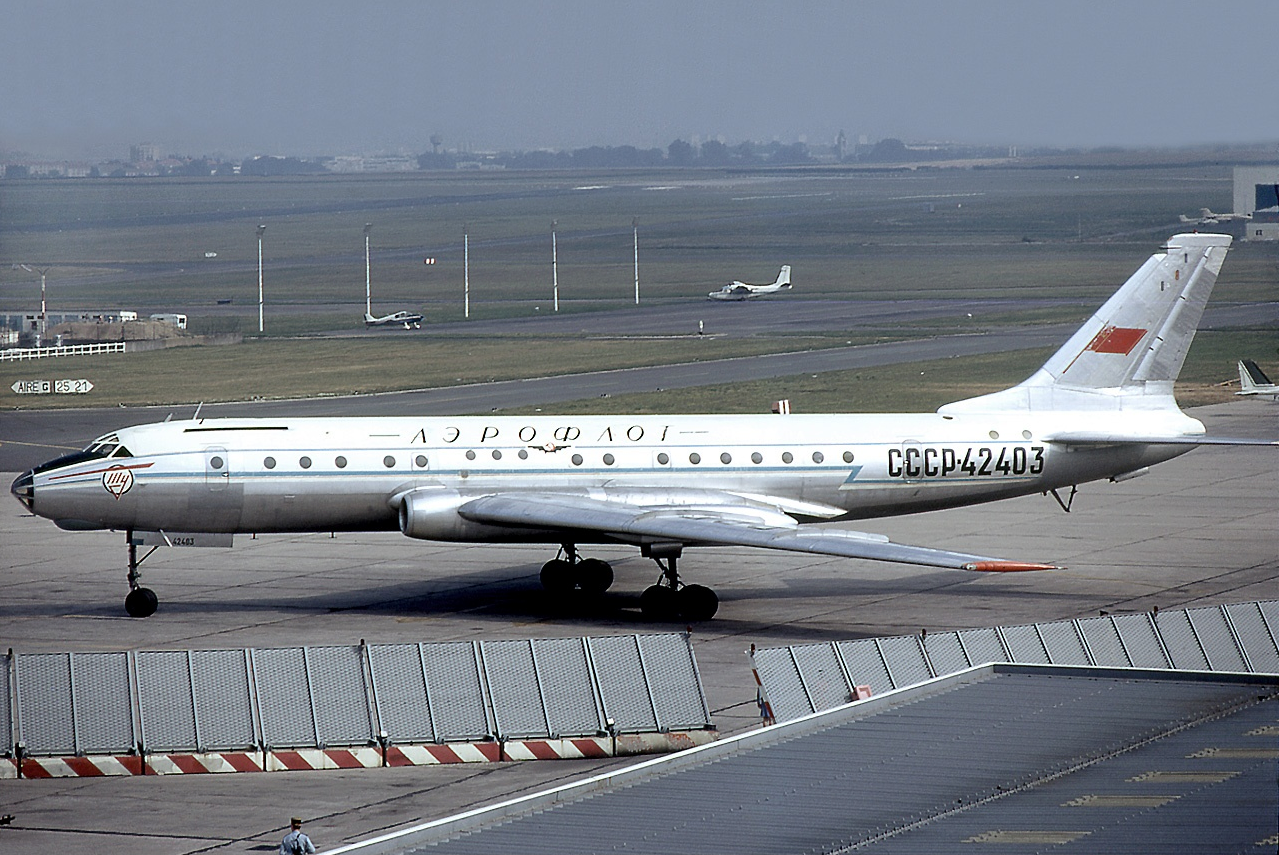
- An Aeroflot Tu-104B, similar to the aircraft involved in the incident

Accident
- Date: 10 October 1971
- Summary: Bombing
- Site: Near Baranovo, Naro-Fominsky District

Aircraft
- Aircraft type: Tupolev Tu-104B
- Operator: Aeroflot (Civil Aviation Administration of Ukraine)
- Registration: CCCP-42490
- Flight origin: Vnukovo Airport, Russia
- Destination: Simferopol Airport, Ukraine
- Passengers: 18
- Crew: 7
- Fatalities: 25
- Survivors: 0

Aeroflot Flight 773 was a scheduled domestic Soviet Union passenger flight from Moscow to Simferopol that crashed following a bomb explosion on 10 October 1971.

== Aircraft ==
The aircraft involved was a Tupolev Tu-104B registered as CCCP-42490 to the Ukraine Civil Aviation Directorate of Aeroflot. Initially built in a 100 passenger configuration, the Tu-104 was later converted to a 115 passenger configuration. At the time of the accident, the aircraft had logged 13,062 flight hours and 10,452 pressurization cycles.

== Crew ==
Seven crew members were aboard the flight. The cockpit crew consisted of:

- Captain Konstantin Romanovich Klyushnik
- Co-pilot Anatoly Yefimovich Vorobevsky
- Navigator Vladimir Alekseevich Solodyannikov
- Flight engineer Valentin Alekseevich Bezrodny
- Radio operator Viktor Ivanovich Obedkov

The two flight attendants consisted of Svetlana Vladimirovna Papushina and Boris Nesterovich Marchenko.

A policeman was also on board, but was counted as a passenger in the report.

== Accident sequence ==
The aircraft arrived at Moscow from Simferopol at 19:02, after which the aircraft was prepared for the return trip to Simferopol. Weather conditions at the time were overcast with low clouds and a visibility of 6 kilometers. Flight 773 took off from Vnukovo Airport at 20:16. Thirty-one seconds later the crew contacted ATC and reported that they were heading for Chornaya Gryaz. The controller ordered the aircraft to climb to 1,500 m (4,900 ft). At 20:16:44 the controller contacted Flight 773 asking them if they had passed through 1,200 m (3,900 ft), but there was no response. The controller attempted several times to contact the crew without success.

Just seconds after the crew reported to the controller about the takeoff, an explosion tore through the aircraft, damaging the left side of the fuselage and supports to the left wing and severing control cables to the tail. The aircraft began rolling to the right with a loss of altitude. Seven kilometers from the airport at 150–200 m (490–660 ft) the cargo hold collapsed and some passenger seats were thrown out. Some 2,700 m (8,900 ft) later, the aircraft crashed at a speed of 550–600 km/h (340–370 mph) at an angle of 10-14° in a 90° right bank near the village of Baranovo, Naro-Fominsky District, some 10 km (6.2 mi) southwest of Vnukovo Airport. All 25 people on board died, including film actress Raisa Zvereva.

== Investigation ==
An investigation showed that debris that fell from the aircraft before the crash showed signs of fire damage. Fragments of TNT were also found. It was concluded that the explosion was the result of a bomb that was located in the luggage compartment; however, it was later revealed that a bomb of 400–800 grams of TNT was placed in a hand baggage on the cabin floor, probably under seat 45. The investigation finished in 1973 without finding the suspect who placed the bomb.
