= Aeroflot Flight 3739 (1976) =

1976 plane crash during takeoff in Irkutsk, Russia

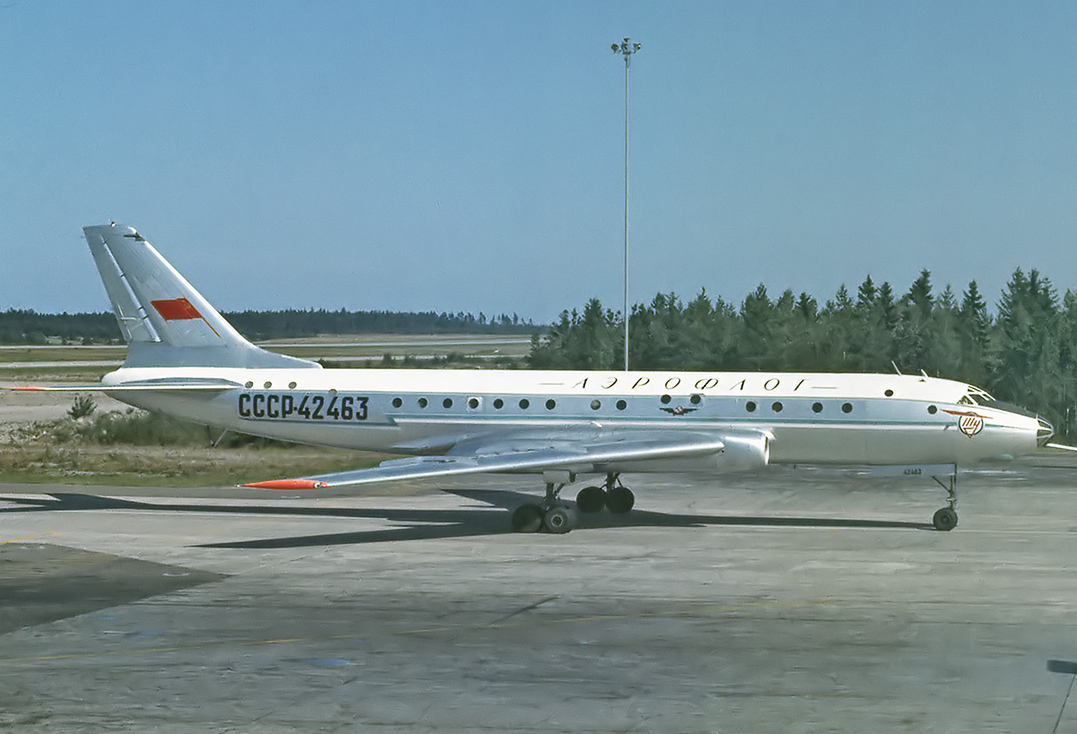
- An Aeroflot Tupolev Tu-104A, similar to the one involved in the accident

Accident
- Date: 9 February 1976
- Summary: Crashed during takeoff due to pilot error, asymmetric refueling
- Site: Near Irkutsk Airport; 52°15′42″N 104°24′37″E

Aircraft
- Aircraft type: Tupolev Tu-104A
- Operator: Aeroflot
- Registration: CCCP-42327
- Flight origin: Irkutsk Airport
- Stopover: Tolmachevo Airport
- Destination: Pulkovo Airport
- Occupants: 114
- Passengers: 104
- Crew: 10
- Fatalities: 24
- Injuries: 78
- Survivors: 90

Aeroflot Flight 3739 was a regularly scheduled Russian domestic flight from Irkutsk to Pulkovo Airport in Saint Petersburg (with a stopover at Tolmachevo Airport in Novosibirsk) that crashed during takeoff from Irkutsk International Airport on 9 February 1976. Twenty-four of the 114 people on board died in the accident.

== Aircraft and crew ==
The aircraft involved in the accident was a Tupolev Tu-104A, registered to Aeroflot. The aircraft made its first flight on 26 November 1956 and was delivered to Irkutsk in December 1957 after being used for test flights. The aircraft was originally configured to seat 70 passengers, but was later re-arranged to seat 85 passengers. At the time of the crash the aircraft had 22,069 flight hours and 10,308 pressurization cycles.

The cockpit crew consisted of the following:

- Ivan Nikolaevich Svistunov serving as pilot in command
- Anatoly Fedorovich Grafenkov serving as copilot
- Yuri Mikhailovich Krasnoyarsk serving as navigator
- Vladimir Nikolaevich Dubrovsky was a navigator in training
- Nikolai Yefimovich Konshin as flight engineer
- German Vladimirovich Firstov served as radio operator
- Ariada Leonidova Shabalina as flight attendant-instructor

The cabin crew consisted of three flight attendants.

== Sequence of events ==
Initially, 99 passengers boarded the plane at Irkutsk. Eventually, 5 more passengers not on the manifest were permitted to board the aircraft, four of them with tickets, one the adult son of the radio operator who didn't have a ticket. Two of the unseated passengers were placed in the restrooms, two in the front of the aircraft, and the radio operator's son sat in the cockpit. None of the five additional passengers were listed in the flight documents. It is not completely clear where the remaining passengers without seats stood. Flight 3739 started takeoff from Irkutsk at 8:15 AM local time at a bearing of 116°. During takeoff the aircraft began to roll to the right, but with considerable effort the pilots rolled the aircraft 20° to the left in efforts to level the aircraft. The aircraft broke away from the runway at 300 km/h (160 kn; 190 mph), when the pilots were able to temporarily level the aircraft only for the aircraft to start banking to the right again at 30 metres (98 ft). Rapidly losing altitude, the aircraft crashed eight seconds after separating from the runway at a bank angle of 70°, just 180 metres (590 ft; 200 yd) past the southeast end of the runway. A Chosonminhang (now Air Koryo) Tupolev Tu-154, registered P-551, was damaged after being struck by the aircraft during the crash.

== Investigation ==
Investigators initially suspected the right wing had been modified during maintenance in such a way that it resulted in an aerodynamic imbalance. To confirm this hypothesis, the remains of the right wing were sent to the Central Aerohydrodynamic Institute, where engineers concluded the right wing was fully functional until impact. Investigators recreated the flight path until impact on another Tupolev Tu-104, and published their findings. Flight testing showed that the Tupolev Tu-104 was prone to banking in a side wind. In the low altitude situation, the pilot's response of adjusting the ailerons was not sufficient; the proper response would have been to sharply pull back on the throttles. They concluded that as soon as the aircraft separated from the runway, the aircraft exceeding the aircraft flight manual recommended 2-3° angle of takeoff, although still 3-4° from a stall angle; the wind was believed to have pushed the right wing into the roll. Calculations showed the right fuel tanks held an estimated 1,300–1,500 kilograms (2,900–3,300 lb) more fuel than the left, contributing to the roll.

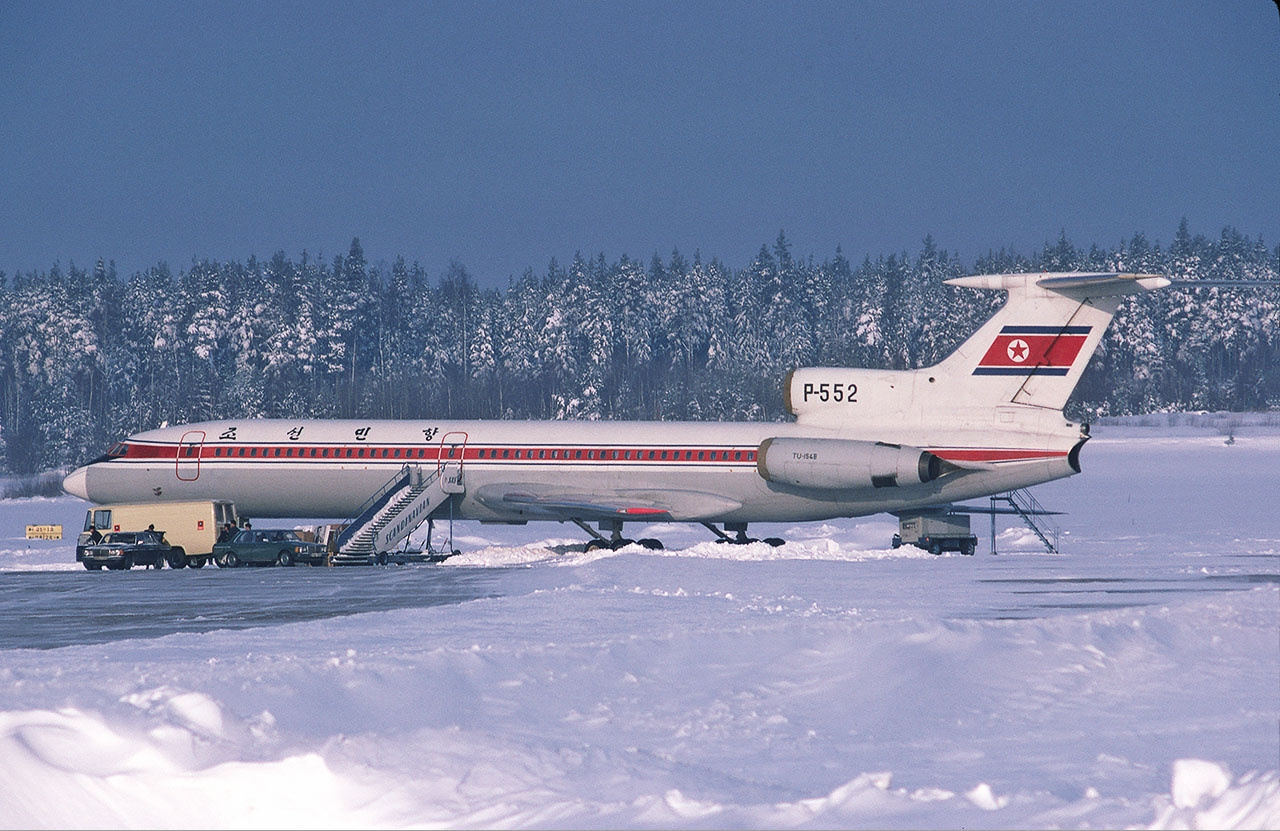
A Chosonminhang (now Air Koryo) Tupolev Tu-154, similar to the aircraft struck by debris

== Causes ==
The commission of the Ministry of Aviation Industry of the USSR tasked with investigating the crash concluded the causes of the accident were as follows;

1. The aircraft was refueled asymmetrically, calculations showed the right fuel tanks held an estimated 1300-1500 kilos more fuel than the left, causing the aircraft to roll to the right;
2. Inadequate pilot response to the emergency, ignoring the automatic angle of attack and (vertical) overload alarm for eight seconds before responding;
3. Increased right bank upon separation from the runway that could not be corrected with ailerons alone.
