= Pushkin Airport =

Airport in Russia

Pushkin
- Аэропорт Пушкин
- Pushkin, Saint Petersburg in Russia
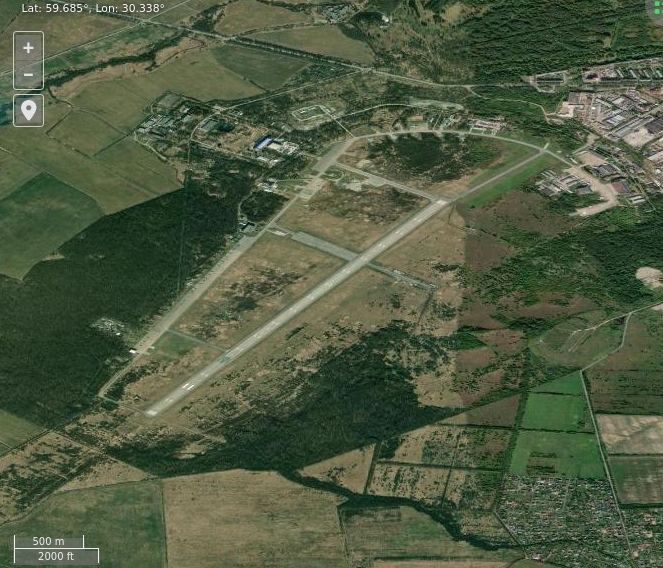
- Satellite imagery of Pushkin Airport

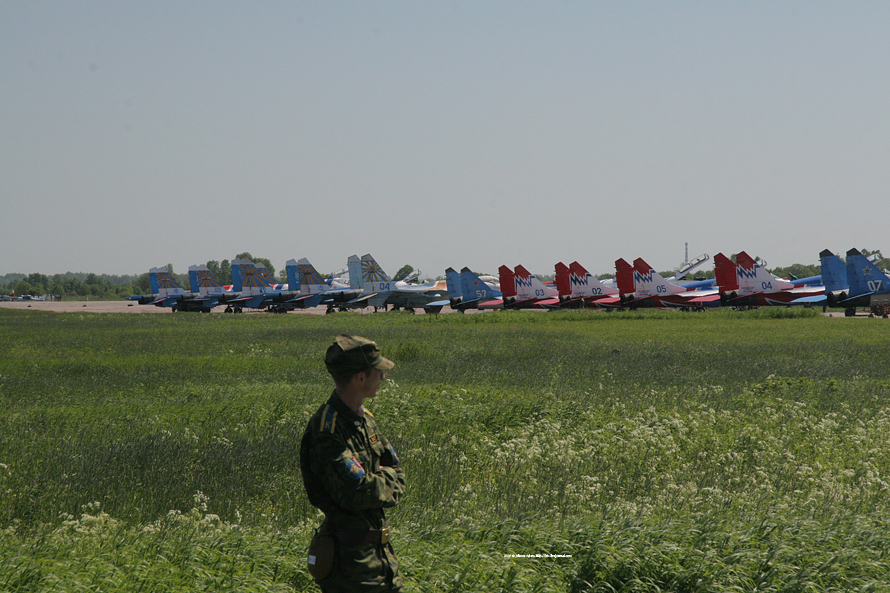

Site information
- Type: Air Base
- Owner: Ministry of Defence
- Operator: Russian Aerospace Forces
- Controlled by: 6th Air and Air Defence Forces Army

Location
- Shown within Saint Petersburg Pushkin (Russia)
- Coordinates: 59°41′6″N 30°20′18″E

Site history
- In use: present

Airfield information
- Identifiers: ICAO: ULLP
- Elevation: 70 metres (230 ft) AMSL
Runways
Direction	Length and surface
03/21	2,500 metres (8,202 ft) Concrete

Pushkin Airport (Russian: Аэропорт Пушкин) (ICAO: ULLP) is an airport in Leningrad Oblast, Russia located 28 km south of Saint Petersburg. It handles small airliners. It was home to 147 OVZ RZB regiment flying Mil Mi-8 helicopters and contains Ilyushin Il-18, Ilyushin Il-22, and Ilyushin Il-38 aircraft.

The base is home to the 332nd Guards Independent Helicopter Regiment as part of the 6th Air and Air Defence Forces Army.

On April 15, 1946, the 405th Air Defence Fighter Aviation Regiment of the 36th Air Defense Fighter Division was relocated to the airfield from the Warsaw airfield on La-5 aircraft. The regiment became part of the 2nd Guards Fighter Aviation Corps. On June 5, 1946, the regiment was disbanded.

Mi-8 and Mi-24 helicopters of the Russian Aerospace Forces, as well as the 20th Aircraft Repair Plant (ARZ) are based at the airfield. On August 11, 2012, a celebration was held dedicated to the 100th anniversary of the Russian Air Force, at which the Su-34, Su-27, MiG-29SMT, MiG-31, Su-24, MiG-25, An-12, An-26 aircraft were demonstrated, An-30, An-72, Mi-8 and Mi-24 helicopters.

Since September 2012, the Red Banner Aviation Base of the Russian Air Force has been based at the airfield.

== See also ==
- List of airports in Russia
- List of military airbases in Russia
- 1981 Pushkin Tu-104 crash
