= Aeroflot Flight 902 =

1962 aviation accident

Coordinates: 56°1′45.84″N 93°4′3″E

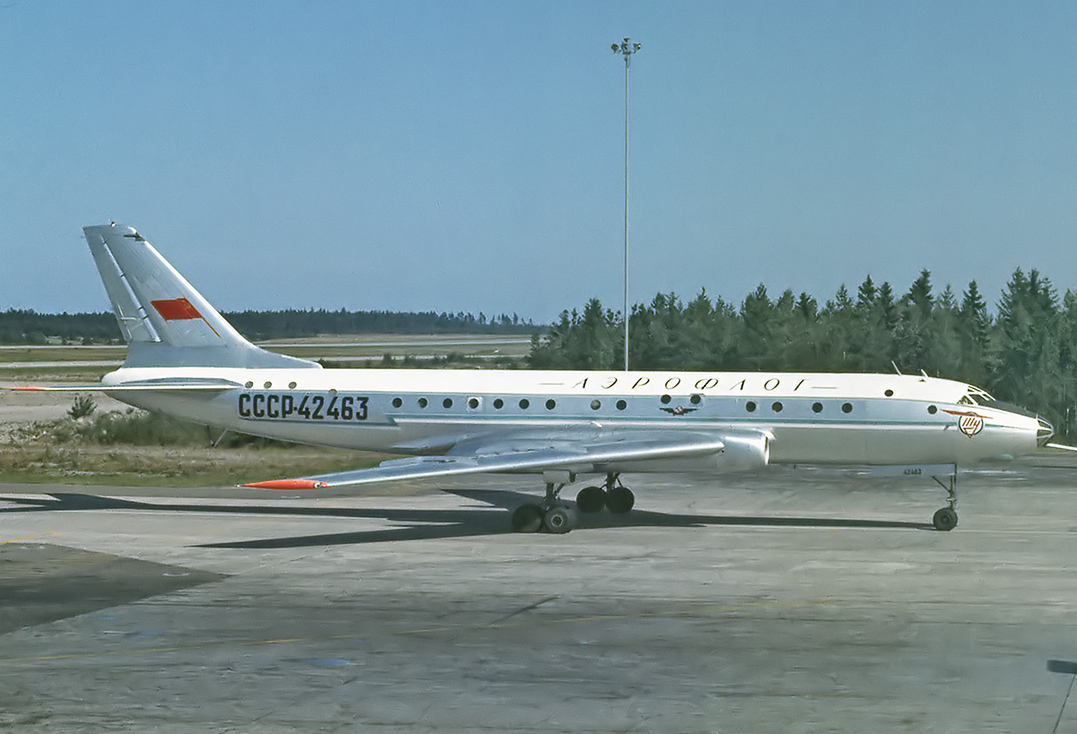
- A Tupolev Tu-104A, similar to the accident aircraft

Accident
- Date: 30 June 1962
- Summary: Stall, loss of control (official) / Accidental shootdown (unofficial)
- Site: Beryozovsky District, Krasnoyarsk Krai, Soviet Union

Aircraft
- Aircraft type: Tupolev Tu-104A
- Operator: Aeroflot/Far East
- Registration: СССР-42370
- Flight origin: Khabarovsk Airport
- 1st stopover: Omsk Airport
- 2nd stopover: Irkutsk Airport
- Destination: Vnukovo Airport
- Occupants: 84
- Passengers: 76
- Crew: 8
- Fatalities: 84
- Survivors: 0

Aeroflot Flight 902 was a passenger flight on a scheduled domestic service from Khabarovsk to Moscow, with intermediate stops at Irkutsk and Omsk, Russia. The flight was operated by a Tu-104A aircraft. On 30 June 1962, with 76 passengers (including 14 children) and 8 crew members aboard, the flight departed Irkutsk on schedule, and made a timely report 50 kilometers from Krasnoyarsk. A few minutes later, an agitated voice later identified as that of the co-pilot made an incoherent emergency transmission with a background of an unusual noise.

The aircraft's wreckage was found 28 km east of Krasnoyarsk Airport, in flat terrain with small areas of forest. Investigators subsequently determined that the plane had impacted the ground upside-down at an angle of 40°. There were no survivors.

== Cause of disaster ==
The official cause of the disaster was reported to be a stall and loss of spatial orientation in cloud. A second theory was a loss of control due to a fire in the passenger cabin. However, damage found on the port side of the fuselage (specifically, an entry hole with signs of fire damage on the inside) was consistent with damage from an anti-aircraft missile, and there was unofficial confirmation that such a missile had gone astray during an air defense exercise in the area.

Unofficial sources indicated that a fragment of the fuselage was found with a 20 cm hole and fire damage, indicating a high-speed impact. At the time of the crash, a unit at nearby Magansk had fired anti-aircraft missiles as part of an exercise. The responsible missile had allegedly lost its intended target in a storm front before hitting the Tu-104.
