= Mikulin AM-3 =

Turbojet aircraft engine

AM-3
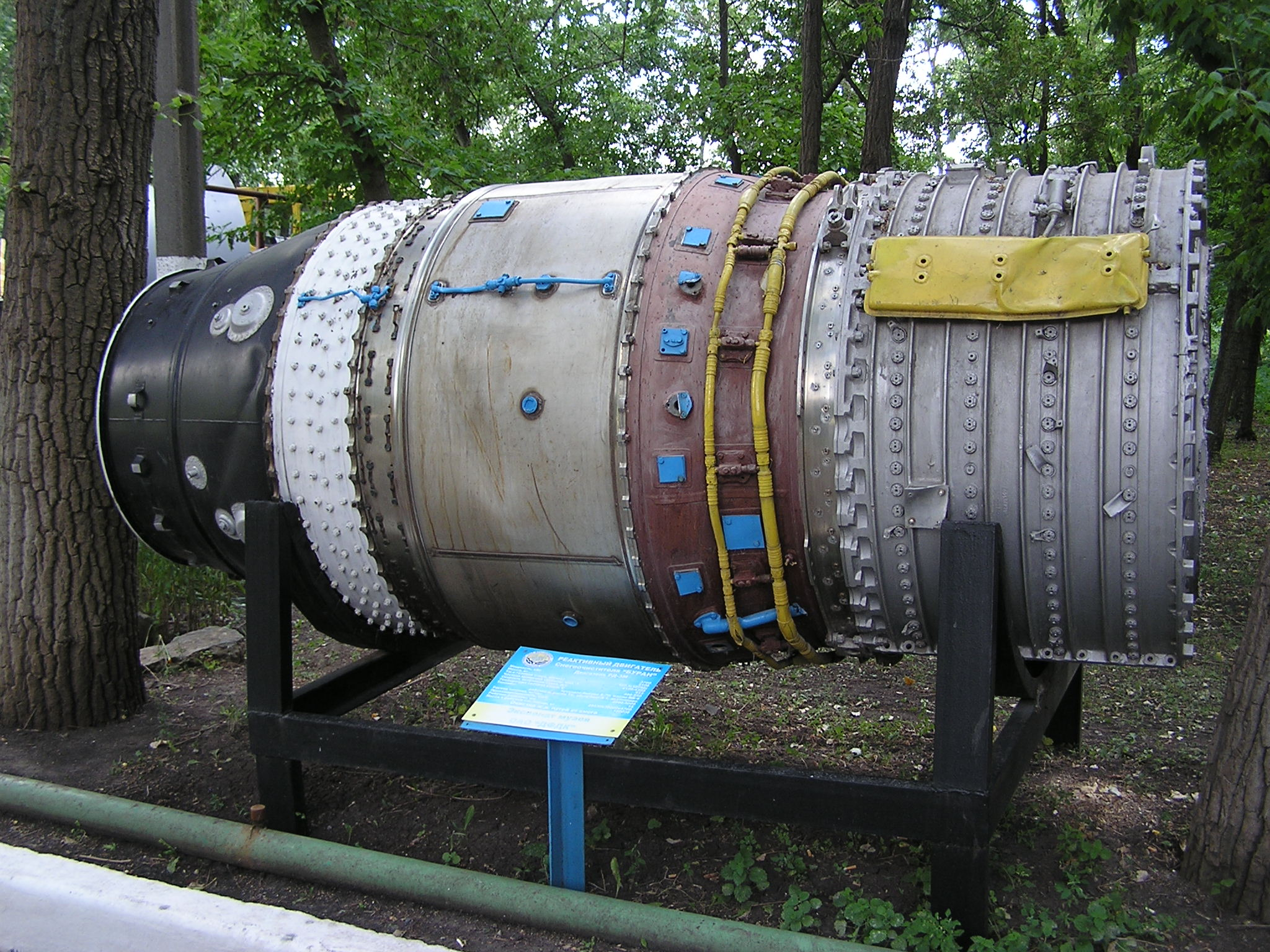
- Type: Turbojet
- National origin: Soviet Union
- Designer: Alexander Mikulin
- Major applications: Tupolev Tu-16; Myasishchev M-4

The Mikulin AM-3 (also called RD-3M) was a turbojet engine developed in the Soviet Union by Alexander Mikulin.

== Design and development ==
The development of the high-performance single-shaft engine began in 1948. The engine was used in different versions for the Tupolev Tu-16 and Tu-104, as well as the Myasishchev M-4. It had a single-stage low-pressure and an eight-stage high-pressure compressor, powered by a two-stage high-pressure turbine.

== Variants ==
AM-3
first series version
AM-3A
AM-3D
Version for M-4 with 85.6 kN (19,200 lb_{f}) thrust
AM-3M-200
AM-3M-500, AM-3M-500A: developed further versions with 93.1 kN (20,900 lb_{f})
WP-8
Chinese copy of the AM-3 with 93.1 kN (20,900 lb_{f}) thrust for the Xian H-6 (reproduction of the Tu-16)

== Specifications ==
==== General characteristics ====
- Type: Turbojet engine
- Length: 5,380 mm (212 in)
- Diameter: 1,400 mm (55 in)
- Dry weight: 3,100 kg (6,800 lb)

==== Components ====
- Compressor: axial-flow, single stage LP, 8-stage HP
- Combustors: 14 x can combustion chambers
- Turbine: axial-flow, 2-stages

==== Performance ====
- Maximum thrust: 85.3 kN (19,200 lb_{f})
- Overall pressure ratio: 6.4
- Turbine inlet temperature: 860°C
- Specific fuel consumption: 93.2 kg/(kN•h)
- Thrust-to-weight ratio: 2.81

== See also ==
- Tumansky RD-9

Comparable engines

- Orenda Iroquois

Related lists

- List of aircraft engines
