= List of accidents and incidents involving the Ilyushin Il-18 =

Accidents and incidents involving the Ilyushin Il-18

Data from:Aviation Safety Network Il-18

== 1958 ==
7 May
A Soviet Air Force Il-18A (CCCP-Л5821, c/n 188000104) crashed near Sheremetyevo Airport after an engine failed while on a test flight, killing all 10 on board in the first loss of an Il-18. The aircraft was operating for Aviatsionnaya Krasnoznamyonnaya Diviziya Osobogo Naznacheniya (AKDON, Red Banner Special Task Aviation Division).

== 1959 ==
2 September
An Aeroflot Il-18B (CCCP-75676, c/n 189000905), from Vnukovo Airport was written off after suffering structural damage in a cumulonimbus cloud while flying over Voronezh Region; all 65 passengers and crew survived.
17 October
An Aeroflot Il-18 suffered substantial damage from a fire in engine three while parked at Kastrup Airport during a stopover; all 30 on board evacuated and survived.

== 1960 ==
27 April
An Aeroflot/Ural Il-18A, CCCP-75648 (c/n 188000402), crashed on landing at Koltsovo Airport while on a training flight due to crew error, killing one of five crew on board.
17 August
Aeroflot Flight 036, an Il-18B (CCCP-75705, c/n 189001702), crashed near Tarasovich, Kyiv Oblast due to loss of control following an in-flight fire, killing all 34 passengers and crew on board; the fire was caused by a leaking fuel injector in engine four.
26 December
An Aeroflot/Ulyanovsk Flight School Il-18A (CCCP-75651, c/n 188000405) lost control and crashed near Vostochny Airport en route from Kuybyshev Airport while on a training flight due to tail icing, killing all 17 passengers and crew on board. Test flights later showed that the Il-18 was prone to loss of control in icing conditions.

== 1961 ==
28 March
ČSA Flight 511, an Il-18V (OK-OAD, c/n 180002102), broke up in mid-air and crashed near Gräfenberg, West Germany following an unexplained high-speed descent, killing all 52 on board. The cause of the descent was not determined, but instrument failures, autopilot problems, pilot incapacitation or an in-flight emergency were theorized.
22 June
An Aeroflot/Moscow Il-18B, CCCP-75672 (c/n 189000901), en route from Vnukovo Airport to Adler/Sochi Airport, suffered an unexplained generator failure on engine three and subsequent fire, force-landing in a field near Bogoroditsk with no casualties among the 97 occupants.
12 July
ČSA Flight 511, an Il-18V (OK-PAF, c/n 181002904), crashed near Casablanca, Morocco, killing all 72 on board; the cause was not determined, but a fast descent in bad weather was theorized.
28 July
An Aeroflot Il-18V (CCCP-75766, c/n 181003405) lost control and crashed at Tretyakovo Airport; the aircraft was on a test flight with the number two propeller feathered when it banked left, stalled, and crashed. The number one propeller went into autorotation, causing negative thrust that led to the loss of control. All six crew survived.
13 August
An Aeroflot/Ulyanovsk Flight School Il-18B (CCCP-75653, c/n 188000502) overshot the runway in poor visibility at Riga Central Airport, Latvia after landing late; all six crew survived.
17 December
Aeroflot Flight 245, an Il-18B (CCCP-75654, c/n 188000503), went into a dive and crashed near Chebotovka, Rostov Oblast after the flight engineer accidentally deployed the flaps, killing all 59 passengers and crew on board.
31 December
An Aeroflot/Armenia Il-18V (CCCP-75757, c/n 181003202) crashed near Mineralnye Vody Airport while attempting a go-around during a charter flight, killing 32 of 119 on board. The aircraft was overloaded: the Il-18V was designed for 84 passengers, not 110.

== 1962 ==
24 February
A TAROM Il-18V (YR-IMB, c/n 181003702) belly landed near Paphos, Cyprus, after all 4 engines failed, perhaps due to fuel filter icing, (see List of airline flights that required gliding). The aircraft was ferried to Moscow for repairs in November 1962, but was never repaired and was written off instead.
23 November
Malév Hungarian Airlines Flight 355, an Il-18V (HA-MOD, c/n 180002002) stalled for reasons unknown and crashed near Le Bourget Airport, killing all 21 passengers and crew on board.
29 November
An Aeroflot/Moscow Ilyushin Il-18V, CCCP-75843 (c/n 182005303), was reported to have crashed on this date, with no further information available.

== 1963 ==
26 February
An Aeroflot/Polar Il-18V (CCCP-75732, c/n 181002601) force-landed on the ice of the Shelikhov Gulf near Bukhta Yemlinskaya due to double engine failure and sank, killing all 10 passengers and crew on board; three initially survived the crash, but later died of hypothermia in the subzero temperatures. A hot air line near the number two engine broke, melting electrical components and starting a fire in the number two engine nacelle, followed by a ruptured fuel line. The aircraft was not equipped with life jackets, signaling equipment or warm clothing.
5 March
Aeroflot Flight 191, an Il-18V (CCCP-75765, c/n 181003404), crashed short of the runway at Ashgabat Airport due to poor visibility caused by a dust storm, killing 12 of 54 on board.
4 April
Aeroflot Flight 25, an Il-18V (CCCP-75866, c/n 183005901), crashed near Urakhcha, Tatarstan after the propeller pitch control mechanism on engine four malfunctioned, killing all 67 passengers and crew on board.
10 November
An Aeroflot/Uzbekistan Il-18B, CCCP-75686 (c/n 189001201), crashed short of the runway on landing at Kuybyshev Airport en route from Tashkent due to pilot error; all 75 on board survived.

== 1964 ==
2 July
An Aeroflot/Moscow Il-18B (CCCP-75661, c/n 188000605) was written off at Krasnodar Airport.
3 August
An Aeroflot/Far East Il-18V (CCCP-75824, c/n 182004903) was written off after landing short and the undercarriage collapsing at Magadan Airport.
2 September
Aeroflot Flight 721, an Il-18V (CCCP-75531, c/n 183006904), struck a hillside near Yuzhno-Sakhalinsk Airport after the crew descended too soon, killing 87 of 93 on board.
19 October
A Soviet Air Force Il-18V (CCCP-75568, c/n 183005704) struck Mount Avala while on approach to Batajnica Air Base in Serbia, killing all 33 passengers and crew on board, including Marshal Sergey Biryuzov and Colonel general Vladimir Zhdanov.

== 1965 ==
4 January
Aeroflot Flight 101/X-20, (Note: Some sources state the flight number as Flight 20 while others state it as Flight 101.) an Il-18B (CCCP-75685, c/n 189001105), crashed short of the runway at Alma-Ata Airport in poor visibility, killing 64 of 103 on board.
8 March
An Aeroflot/Kyrgyzstan Il-18B (CCCP-75690, c/n 189001205) landed wheels-up at Frunze Airport after the crew forgot to lower the landing gear during multiple go-arounds; no casualties. The aircraft was repaired and returned to service.
23 December
An Aeroflot/Moscow Il-18B (CCCP-75688, c/n 189001203) suffered severe structural damage near Magadan, whilst en route, after a dive from 8,000 m (26,000 ft).

== 1966 ==
1 February
A Cubana Il-18 overran the runway on landing at Halifax International Airport and crashed into a snow bank; all 44 on board survived.
27 March
A Cubana Il-18B (CU-T831, c/n 182005202) from Santiago-Antonio Maceo Airport to José Martí International Airport was hijacked by the flight engineer who shot the on-board security guard and demanded to be flown to Florida, but the pilot continued to Havana instead. When the hijacker saw an Aeroflot aircraft on the tarmac, he realized he had been tricked and shot the pilot dead and tried to begin takeoff, but the co-pilot shut down the engines. The hijacker jumped out of the plane and fled; he was caught days later.
7 July
A Cubana Il-18 flying from Antonio Maceo Airport to José Martí International Airport, was hijacked by nine people (including the pilot) and flown to Jamaica.
10 July
A Cubana Ilyushin Il-18V (CU-T830, c/n 182004905) made a forced landing at Cienfuegos due to multiple engine failure, killing two of 93 on board.
27 August
Aeroflot Flight 3772, an Il-18V (CCCP-75552, c/n 184007404) flying from Talaghy Airport to Shosseynaya Airport, overran the runway after an aborted take-off with the rudder gust-lock engaged; all 121 passengers and crew on board survived.
22 November
Aeroflot Flight X-19, an Il-18B (CCCP-75665, c/n 188000704), left the runway and crashed on takeoff from Alma-Ata Airport, killing three of 68 on board.
24 November
TABSO Flight 101 crashed near Bratislava; killing all 82 passengers and crew on board; the cause was not determined, but crew error was blamed. The crash remains Slovakia's worst air disaster.

== 1967 ==
24 January
A Vietnam Civil Aviation Ilyushin Il-18D (VN-1590, c/n 186008804) slid off the runway while landing at Nanning Wuxu International Airport en route from Hanoi after the landing gear collapsed; all 17 on board were able to escape before the aircraft burned out. The aircraft was overloaded above its max landing weight.
6 April
An Aeroflot/235 Aviation Det. Il-18V (CCCP-75563, c/n 184007802) was being ferried from Domodedovo Airport to Vnukovo Airport when it crashed on climbout, killing all eight crew on board.
9 July
An Air Guinee Il-18V (3X-GAB, c/n 181003703) on a flight to Praha-Ruzyne International Airport in Czechoslovakia, diverted to Casablanca-Anfa Airport, Morocco due to bad weather, but hit a building on landing and was damaged beyond repair, with no casualties among the 102 occupants.
5 September
ČSA Flight 523, an Il-18D (OK-WAI, c/n 187009705), crashed shortly after takeoff from Gander, Newfoundland, Canada. Thirty-seven of the 69 passengers and crew aboard were killed; the cause was never determined.
16 November
Aeroflot Flight 2230, an Il-18V (CCCP-75538, c/n 184007002), lost control at 200 m (660 ft) and crashed on climbout from Koltsovo Airport after an engine fire, killing all 8 crew and 99 passengers.

== 1968 ==
9 January
An Aeroflot/Northern Il-18V (CCCP-75519, c/n 183006702) was damaged beyond repair when it landed 700 m (770 yd) short of the runway at Karaganda Airport.
24 February
A Soviet Government Il-18V (CCCP-75560, c/n 184007704) overran the runway at Donetsk Airport and was damaged beyond repair.
29 February
Aeroflot Flight 15, an Il-18D (CCCP-74252, c/n 187010601), broke up at 650 m (2,130 ft) following a high-speed descent from 3,000 m (9,800 ft) and crashed near Parchum, killing 83 of 84 on board; the cause was not determined, but a fuel leak (and resultant fire) in the left wing was blamed.
22 April
An Aeroflot Il-18V (CCCP-75526, c/n 183006804) struck power lines and crashed near Domodedovo Airport while on a training flight, killing all five crew on board.
3 September
A Bulair Il-18E (LZ-BEG, c/n 186009101) crashed near Karnobat after the crew deviated from flight rules to attempt a visual approach in bad weather, killing 47 of 89 on board. The aircraft was leased from TABSO and operated for Bulair.
20 October
An Aeroflot/West Siberia Il-18D (CCCP-75436, c/n 186009505) on a scheduled flight from Novosibirsk-Tolmachevo Airport to Yakutsk Airport, diverted to Krasnoyarsk Airport, due to weather. The aircraft landed hard 200 m (220 yd) short of the runway causing the fuselage to break and a fire to erupt. No casualties were reported but the aircraft was damaged beyond repair.

== 1969 ==
20 March
A United Arab Airlines Il-18 (SU-APC) crashed while attempting to land at Aswan International Airport. One hundred of the 105 passengers and crew on board were killed.
26 August
An Aeroflot Il-18B (CCCP-75708, c/n 189001705) landed on its belly at Vnukovo Airport after the crew forgot to lower the landing gear, killing 16 of 102 on board.
10 September
Aeroflot Flight 93, an Il-18V (CCCP-75791, c/n 181004005) on a flight from Krasnoyarsk Airport to Yakutsk Airport, was written off at Yakutsk after striking an ambulance crossing the runway.
19 October
A LOT Polish Airlines Il-18 was hijacked by two East German men and flown to Tegel Airport, West Berlin; after three hours on the ground the aircraft took off for Schönefeld. Both hijackers requested asylum in West Berlin.
11 November
An Aeroflot/Ural Il-18B (CCCP-75699, c/n 188000803) went into a dive at 8,400 m (27,600 ft) due to crew errors en route from Sverdlovsk (now Yekaterinburg) to Tashkent; the crew was able to recover at 6,600 m (21,700 ft). Although the aircraft was able to land safely, it had suffered structural damage in the nearly 2.7 g dive and was written off. The fuselage was used to rebuild Il-18V CCCP-74297 (c/n 184007203) after it was damaged in a fire at ARZ-402.

== 1970 ==
6 February
Aeroflot Flight U-45, an Il-18V (CCCP-75798), struck a mountain en route to Samarkand from Tashkent, killing 92 of 106 on board.
5 June
An Aeroflot/Uzbekistan Il-18V (CCCP-75533, c/n 180002502) crashed on take-off at Samarkand Airport with a locked rudder.
23 August
Aeroflot Flight 17, an Il-18V (CCCP-75823), was written off after a hard landing at Yuzhno-Sakhalinsk Airport due to pilot error; no casualties.
16 October
An Aeroflot/Armenia Il-18V (CCCP-75578, c/n 185008102) overran the runway on landing at Simferopol Airport, Ukraine after diverting there following engine failure; no casualties.
31 December
Aeroflot Flight 3012, an Il-18V (CCCP-75773), crashed on climbout from Pulkovo Airport after the crew forgot to select the flaps before takeoff, killing six of 86 on board.

== 1971 ==
18 January
Balkan Bulgarian Airlines Flight 130, a Il-18D (LZ-BED, c/n 186009002), crashed on approach to Kloten Airport after the pilot attempted to correct the glide path, killing 45 of 47 on board.
21 January
An GosNII GVF Il-18B (CCCP-75727, c/n 180002303) entered a dive from 8,000 m (26,000 ft) while flying over the Rostov-on-Don region, possibly due to autopilot failure; after descending to 5,000 m (16,000 ft), the crew regained control and made an emergency landing at Rostov-on-Don Airport. The aircraft was written off due to severe structural damage it suffered during the 3.5 g dive.
22 August
A United Arab Airlines Il-18 flying from Cairo International Airport to Amman-Marka International Airport was hijacked by a lone hijacker who demanded to be taken to Israel.
28 August
Malév Flight 731, an Il-18 (HA-MOC, c/n 181002903), crashed into the sea near Copenhagen while executing an instrument approach. The main cause of the accident was a microburst, a particularly dangerous and unpredictable meteorological phenomenon. Twenty-three passengers and the crew of 9 died, two passengers survived. The captain of the aircraft was Dezső Szentgyörgyi, a World War II flying ace of the Royal Hungarian Air Force, who was due to retire less than 3 weeks after the date of the accident.
21 December
A Balkan Bulgarian Airlines Il-18V (LZ-BES, c/n 185008104) crashed shortly after take-off from Sofia-Vrazhdebna Airport, Bulgaria, en route to Algiers-Dar el Beida Airport, Algeria. Twenty-eight of the 73 occupants were killed. The aircraft had just undergone ground maintenance; the elevator controls had been connected backwards for unknown reasons. The aircraft was carrying members of a Bulgarian cultural delegation (among them the Sofia Orchestra) to festivities in Algeria. Singer Pasha Hristova was among the dead.
23 December
A Malév Il-18D (HA-MOI, c/n 187010002) on a scheduled flight from Nicosia Airport, Cyprus, to Damascus International Airport, Syria, made contact with a 759 m (2,490 ft) hill whilst on approach to Damascus. Control of the aircraft was retained and a safe landing was made.

== 1972 ==
26 August
An Aeroflot/Northern Il-18B (CCCP-75663, c/n 188000702) was damaged beyond repair after it crashed on landing in fog at Talaghy Airport.
31 August
Aeroflot Flight 558, an Il-18V (CCCP-74298), crashed near Smelovskiy, Chelyabinsk Oblast after a loss of control following a fire in the baggage compartment, killing all 102 passengers and crew on board.
1 October
Aeroflot Flight 1036 (an Il-18V, CCCP-75507), crashed in the Black Sea shortly after takeoff from Adler/Sochi Airport for reasons unknown, killing all 109 passengers and crew on board. Bird strikes were blamed.
14 December
An Interflug Il-18D (DM-STM, c/n 188010805) suffered minor damage after landing at the wrong airport; all 28 on board survived. The aircraft landed at the smaller Bombay Juhu airstrip instead of the larger Santa Cruz Airport.

== 1973 ==
29 January
EgyptAir Flight 741 (Il-18D, SU-AOV) crashed in the Kyrenia Mountains, Cyprus while on approach to Nicosia International Airport, killing all 37 passengers and crew on board.
24 February
Aeroflot Flight 630, an Il-18V (CCCP-75712, c/n 189001803) on a domestic scheduled passenger service from Dushanbe Airport to Leninabad Airport, Tajikistan, entered a spin after a high-speed stall during hard maneuvering, breaking up at 2,000 m (6,600 ft), killing all 79 occupants.
3 March
Balkan Bulgarian Airlines Flight 307 (an Il-18, LZ-BEM) lost control and crashed near Skhodnya, Moscow while on approach to Sheremetyevo International Airport, killing all 25 passengers and crew on board; tail icing was suspected.
11 May
Aeroflot Flight 6551 (an Il-18B, CCCP-75687) crashed 53 mi S of Semipalatinsk due to an in-flight breakup following an unexplained descent, killing all 63 passengers and crew on board.

== 1974 ==
27 April
An Aeroflot/Leningrad Il-18V (CCCP-75559) crashed shortly after takeoff from Pulkovo Airport due to loss of control following an uncontained engine failure, killing all 109 passengers and crew on board.
9 May
An Aeroflot/Ural Il-18V (CCCP-75425, c/n 181003403) on a domestic scheduled passenger flight to Ivano-Frankivsk International Airport, Ukraine en route from Sverdlovsk was damaged beyond repair after landing on a short runway, overrunning into a ravine.
24 June
Aeroflot Flight 5139, an Il-18E (CCCP-75405, c/n 186009005), suffered a bird strike on the number one engine during takeoff from Tashkent-Yuzhny Airport, Uzbekistan. The aircraft was unable to climb and crashed killing one passenger out of 114 occupants.
11 August
An Air Mali Il-18V (TZ-ABE, c/n 181003304) on an unscheduled Hajj passenger flight from Bamako Airport, Mali to Niamey Airport, Niger, was damaged beyond repair in a forced landing after a navigational error. The aircraft ran out of fuel and force-landed near Linoghin, Burkina Faso, killing 47 of the 60 occupants.
9 December
A TAROM (but operating for EgyptAir) Il-18D (YR-IMK, c/n 186009104) from Jeddah International Airport to Cairo International Airport on a repositioning flight with no passengers on board, crashed into the Red Sea killing the 9 crew members (6 Romanian flight crew, 3 Egyptian stewardesses).

== 1975 ==
15 January
Malév Flight 801A (an Il-18V, HA-MOH) was being ferried from East Berlin to Budapest when it crashed on approach to Ferihegy Airport due to weather, poor visibility, poor CRM and possible spatial disorientation, killing the nine crew.
12 February
An Aeroflot/Moscow Il-18V (CCCP-75801, c/n 182004301) was damaged beyond repair after undershooting the runway at Krasnoyarsk Airport.

== 1976 ==
30 January
An Aeroflot/Kyrgyzstan Il-18V (CCCP-75558, c/n 184007505) on a training flight, crashed near Frunze Airport, after the number three engine failed to restart after un-feathering, during a go-around with the right side engines shut down. All 6 crew-members were killed.
6 March
Aeroflot Flight 909 (an Il-18E, CCCP-75408, c/n 186009201) crashed near Verkhnyaya Khava, Russia due to loss of control following an electrical failure, killing all 111 passengers and crew and 7 on ground in the deadliest accident involving the Il-18.
28 July
ČSA Flight 001 crashed during a flight from Ruzyně Airport; during the approach, the crew accidentally set both inboard engines to reverse thrust, and this caused engine three to fail. The crew inadvertently shut down engine four (which was on the same wing as engine 3). This caused the aircraft to veer to the right during the emergency landing at Ivanka Airport in Bratislava, crashing into the Zlaté Piesky lake, killing 76 of the 79 people on board.
28 October
A CSA Il-18 with 105 occupants on a domestic flight from Ruzyne International Airport to Ivanka Airport was hijacked and flown to Munich in West Germany where the hijacker surrendered.
30 October
An Aeroflot/Uzbekistan Il-18V (CCCP-75575, c/n 185008004) overshot the runway at Tashkent Airport in bad weather; all 97 on board survived.
December
A Balkan Bulgarian Airlines Il-18V (LZ-BEL, c/n 182004601) burned out in a fire at an overhaul plant at Tashkent Airport, Uzbekistan.

== 1977 ==
2 January
A CSA Il-18V (OK-NAA, c/n 189001604) was struck during takeoff by a CSA Tupolev Tu-134 which was landing at Ruzyne International Airport. None of the 6 occupants of the Il-18 were killed and the aircraft was repaired and returned to service. After it was withdrawn from use in 1981, the Il-18 was transferred to the Prague Aviation Museum.
15 February
Aeroflot Flight 5003, an Il-18V (CCCP-75520), stalled and crashed near Mineralnye Vody when the crew performed a missed approach, killing 77 of the 98 people aboard.
27 February
A CAAC Il-18B (B-204, c/n 189001602) struck trees and power lines and crashed on approach to Shenyang Dongta Airport, killing all 25 on board and one person on the ground. The crew probably failed to monitor the instruments during the approach.
21 April
A TAROM Il-18V (YR-IMI) landed hard, bounced and left the runway during a touch-and-go landing at Bucharest Otopeni International Airport. All five crew survived.
23 November
Malév Hungarian Airlines Flight 203, an Il-18V (HA-MOF, c/n 183006301) on a scheduled flight from Yesilköy Airport to Bucharest Otopeni International Airport, was written off after colliding with two trucks after landing at Bucharest in rain. The truck drivers were in the wrong place.

== 1978 ==
6 May
An Aeroflot Il-18 flying from Ashgabat to Mineralyne Vody was hijacked by a man demanding to be flown to Iran. Armed with a homemade pistol and a training grenade, the hijacker shot the co-pilot and was then shot and killed by security guards. The aircraft was able to return safely to Ashgabat.
10 May
A CSA Il-18 flying from Ruzyne International Airport to Brno Turany Airport in Czechoslovakia was hijacked and flown to Frankfurt in Germany, where the hijackers surrendered.
3 September
An Air Guinee Il-18D (3X-GAX, c/n 187009803) from Moscow to Conakry Airport, Guinea, crashed into marshland near Conakry, killing 15 out of a total of 17 occupants.

== 1979 ==
26 March
An Interflug Il-18D (DM-STL, c/n 186009402) aborted take-off at Luanda-Quatro de Fevereiro Airport after the number two engine failed, overrunning the runway, striking the ILS localiser and bursting into flames, killing all 10 occupants.
10 May
An Aeroflot/Ural Il-18D (CCCP-75414, c/n 186009303) crashed after an aborted take-off at Adler/Sochi Airport.

== 1980 ==
30 January
Two men attempted to hijack an Interflug Il-18 flying from Erfurt Airport to East Berlin but were overpowered by crew and passengers.

== 1981 ==
26 March
A Hàng Không Việtnam Il-18D (VN-B190?, c/n 188010703) was reported to have crashed at Hoa Binh, Vietnam.

== 1982 ==
25 July
CAAC Flight 2805, an Il-18 (B-220, c/n 187009605) flying a scheduled passenger service from Xi'an Xiguan Airport to Shanghai-Hongqiao Airport, China was hijacked by five men armed with knives and a bomb demanding to be flown to Taiwan, although they later agreed to be flown to Hong Kong as the aircraft did not have enough fuel to reach Taiwan. During the ordeal, the co-pilot and navigator were wounded and were allowed to move to the rear of the aircraft to use the medical kit, but while there, they organized two groups of passengers who overpowered the hijackers and five additional people were injured in the process. The bomb was thrown and went off, blowing a hole in the fuselage, but no depressurization occurred. The aircraft landed at Shanghai with two engines flamed out.
25 August
A LOT Polish Airlines Il-18E (SP-LSI, c/n 186008905) operating a flight from Budapest Ferihegy Airport to Okecie Airport, was diverted to Munich-Riem Airport in Germany by two male hijackers.
24 December
CAAC Flight 2311, an Il-18B (B-202, c/n 189001401), burned out on the runway at Guangzhou-Baiyun Airport after a passenger's cigarette started a fire, killing 25 of 69 on board.

== 1984 ==
16 June
A Balkan Bulgarian Airlines Il-18V (LZ-BEP, c/n 185008105), was damaged beyond repair after a failed landing at Sanaa International Airport.

== 1985 ==
19 January
A Cubana Il-18D (CU-T899, c/n 188011102) lost control and crashed near San José de las Lajas after the cargo shifted, killing all 38 passengers and crew on board.

== 1988 ==
18 January
China Southwest Airlines Flight 4146 (an Il-18D, B-222) crashed while on approach to Chongqing Airport due to loss of control caused by an engine fire, killing all 108 passengers and crew on board.

== 1990 ==
23 August
A Soviet Navy Il-20 (c/n 173011403) failed to take off from Kacha Air Base, Ukraine; the crew aborted takeoff but the aircraft could not be stopped in time and veered off the runway and broke apart. All crew escaped unhurt; the crew had forgotten to unlock the rudder before takeoff.

== 1991 ==
13 August
TAROM Flight 785A, an Il-18V (YR-IMH, c/n 185008301), crashed near Uricani, Romania, after the crew descended too soon, killing all nine passengers and crew on board.

== 1992 ==
15 November
An Aero Caribbean Il-18D (CU-T1270, c/n 187010301) struck Pico Isabel de Torres near San Felipe de Puerto Plata, while on approach to Gregorio Luperón International Airport, Dominican Republic, for an intermediate stop, killing all 34 passengers and crew on board. The crew performed the turn to final approach too far out, at 9 nm instead of 4 nm.

== 1995 ==
January
A Kazakhstan Government Ilyushin Il-22M15 (UN-75915, c/n 2964111701) was written off after a ground collision with an Antonov An-12 at Almaty Airport.

== 1997 ==
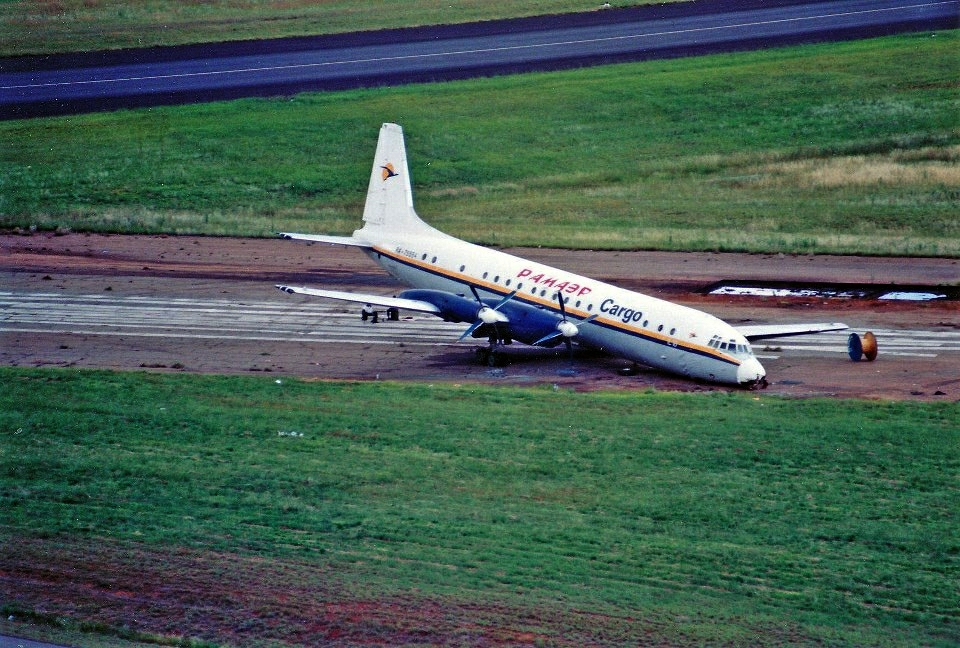
Ramaer Cargo, December 17, 1997

17 December
Ramaer Cargo Flight 202, an Il-18GrM (RA-75554, c/n 185008404) from Johannesburg International Airport, to Bujumbura International Airport, Burundi, was written off after an aborted take-off due to an incorrect center of gravity.

== 1998 ==
23 November
An Air Cess Ilyushin Il-18Gr (3D-SBZ, c/n 188010903) was strafed on the ground by fighters from the Zimbabwe Air Force at Kalemie Airport, Democratic Republic of Congo.

== 2000 ==
25 October
Russian Air Force Il-18D (RA-74295) struck Mount Mtirala, in the Meskheti Range, while on approach to Chorokh Airport due to crew and ATC errors, killing all 84 passengers and crew on board.

== 2001 ==
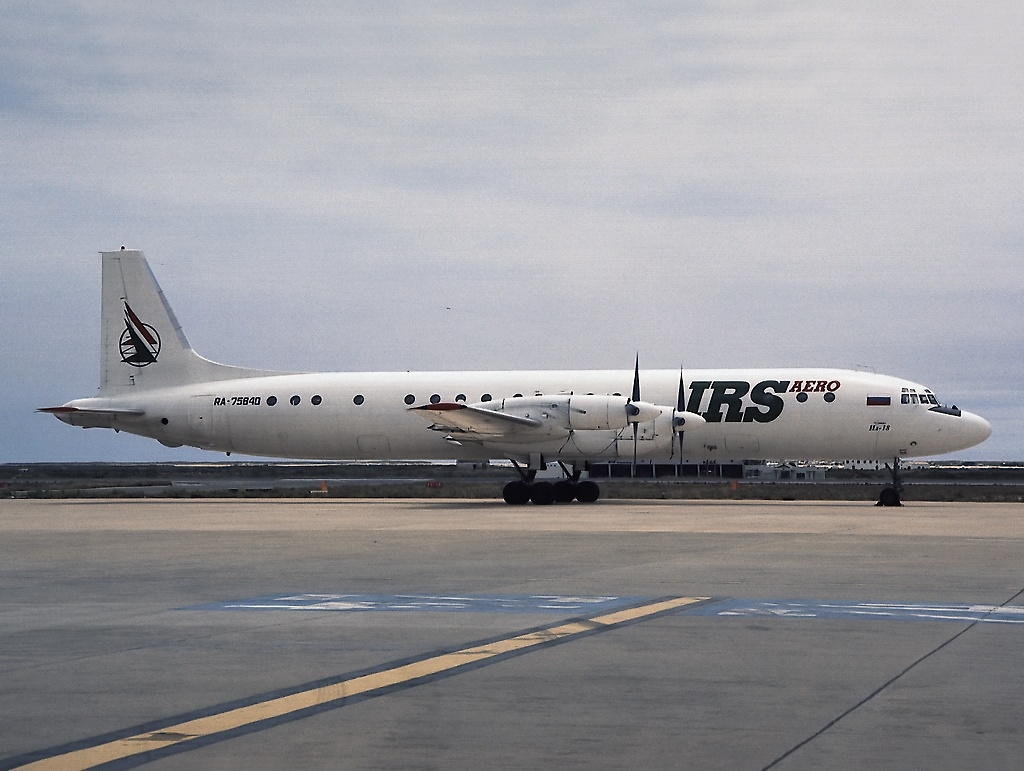
RA-75840 at Faro Airport.

19 November
IRS Aero Flight 9601/02, an Il-18V (RA-75840) crashed near Kalyazin after the elevator control system malfunctioned, killing all 27 passengers and crew on board. Russia ended passenger operations of the Il-18 in the wake of this accident.

== 2002 ==
15 September
A Phoenix Aviation Il-18V (EX-904, c/n 182004904) overran the runway on landing at Nzagi Airport, Angola; no casualties.
15 September
An IRS Aero Il-18V (RA-75423, c/n 182005601) overran the runway on landing at Bykovo Airport, suffering substantial damage; the aircraft was repaired and returned to service.
1 October
Two Indian Navy Il-38s (IN-302 and IN-304) collided in mid-air near Gabolim Airport following a flyover in practice for the 25th anniversary celebration of the Goa naval air squadron, killing all 12 on board both aircraft; the crash of IN-302 also killed three people on the ground.

== 2004 ==
27 January
A Renan Il-18D (ER-ICJ, c/n 186009102), overshot the runway on takeoff from Luena Airport, Angola; all 18 on board survived.
4 February
Expo Aviation Flight 3002, an Il-18D (EX-005, c/n 188011105) leased from Phoenix Air, struck the water while on approach to Bandaranaike International Airport. Climb power was applied and the crew reported they were performing a go-around, but at a height of 60–90 m (200–300 ft) the pilot decided to continue the approach. Fearing that the landing gear was damaged, the pilot belly-landed the aircraft next to the runway. All seven crew survived; the co-pilot had programmed the altimeter incorrectly.
6 March
Aero Caribbean Flight 4317, an Il-18D (CU-T1532, c/n 188010904), was written off after the number four engine caught fire during the takeoff roll at Frank Pais Airport, Cuba; all on board were able to evacuate the aircraft.

== 2005 ==
28 March
Cubana Flight 4311, an Il-18D (CU-T1539, c/n 2964017102; ex Soviet/Russian Air Force Il-22M-11) overran the runway after failing to take off from Simon Bolivar Airport, Venezuela; all 97 on board survived. The aircraft was leased from Aero Caribbean and operating for Cubana.

== 2008 ==
26 September
An Alada Empresa de Transportes Aereos Il-18D (D2-FFR, c/n 0393607150) overran the runway on takeoff from Cabinda Airport following a rejected takeoff due to blown tires; no casualties.

== 2016 ==
19 December
Russian Air Force Il-18V RF-91821 crash-landed in Yakutia, Siberia, during severe weather conditions, seriously injuring 16. The crew deviated from the approach pattern and began descending until the wings hit the top of a 502 m (1,647 ft) snow-covered hill in the tundra.

== 2018 ==
17 September
Russian Air Force Il-20M RF-93610 with 14 people on board was shot down near Latakia, Syria. Later reports showed that Syria accidentally shot down the aircraft.
23 November
A NPP Mir Il-18Grm (54006, c/n 187009802) ran off the runway on landing at Naryan-Mar Airport; all seven crew survived.

== 2023 ==
24 June
Russian Air Force Il-22M-11 VzPU airborne command post RA-75917 was, through several Telegram video and casualty postings, reported shot down by PMC Wagner forces along the highway from Rostov-on-Don to Voronezh, during the Wagner Group rebellion and “March to Justice” towards Moscow. 8 crew members were identified as having been killed.

== 2024 ==
14 January
Russian Air Force Il-22M-11RT RF-95678 was heavily damaged (most likely by a surface-to-air missile) while on duty in the area of Strilkove, Ukraine at about 21 p.m. on January 14. After the hit, the plane managed to land in Anapa, requested evacuation, calling an ambulance and a fire truck. A voice recording was published by RBC-Ukraine of the pilot requesting coordination of emergency airport services.
