= Nino Cirani =

Italian explorer and photographer (1926–1998)

Egidio Antonio Fausto Cirani
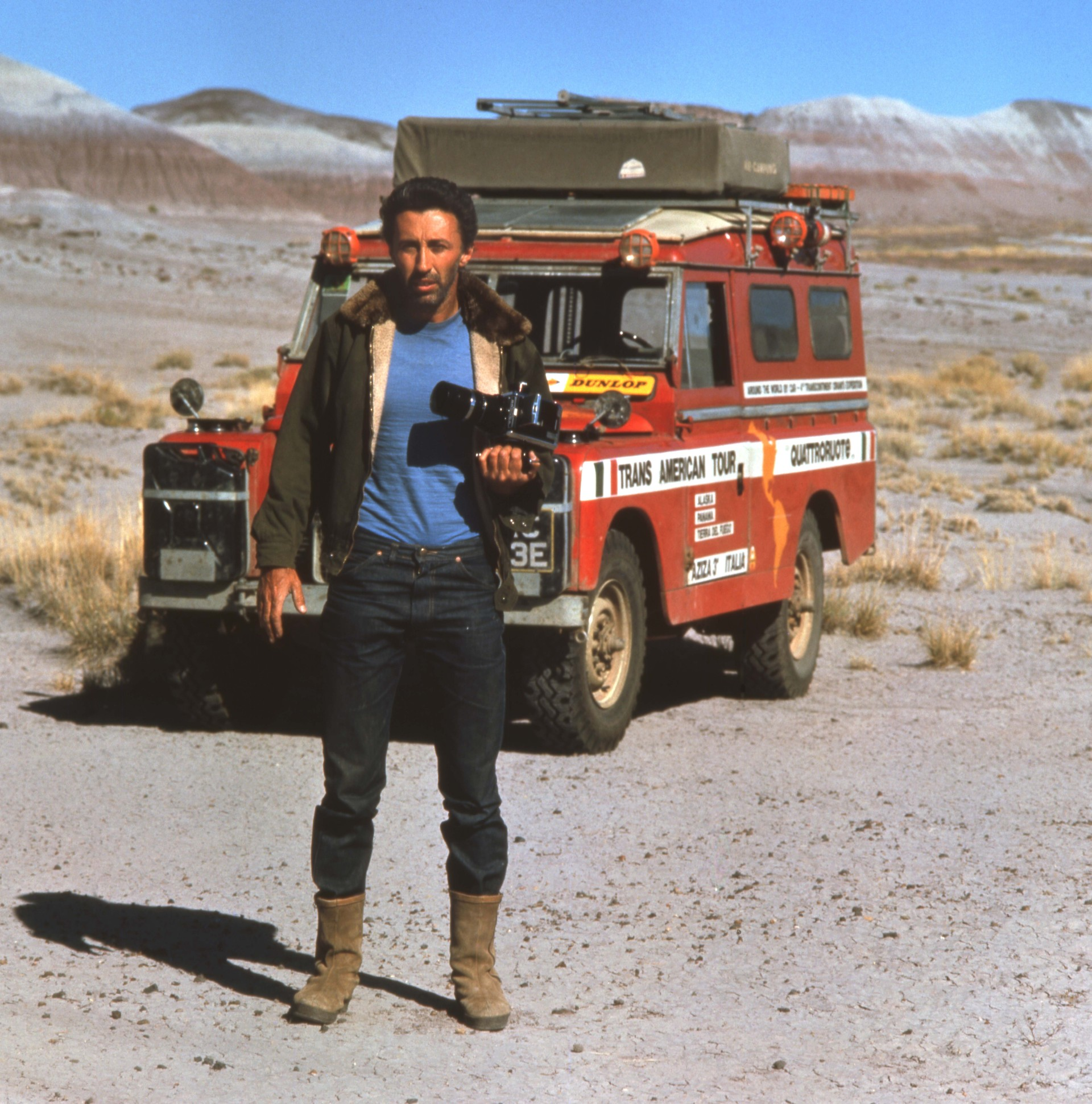
- Born: Modena; September 12, 1926
- Died: Castellanza; March 21, 1998
- Other name: Nino
- Citizenship: Italian

Egidio Antonio Fausto Cirani, known as Nino (September 12, 1926 – March 21, 1998), was an Italian journalist, explorer, and photographer.

== Biography ==
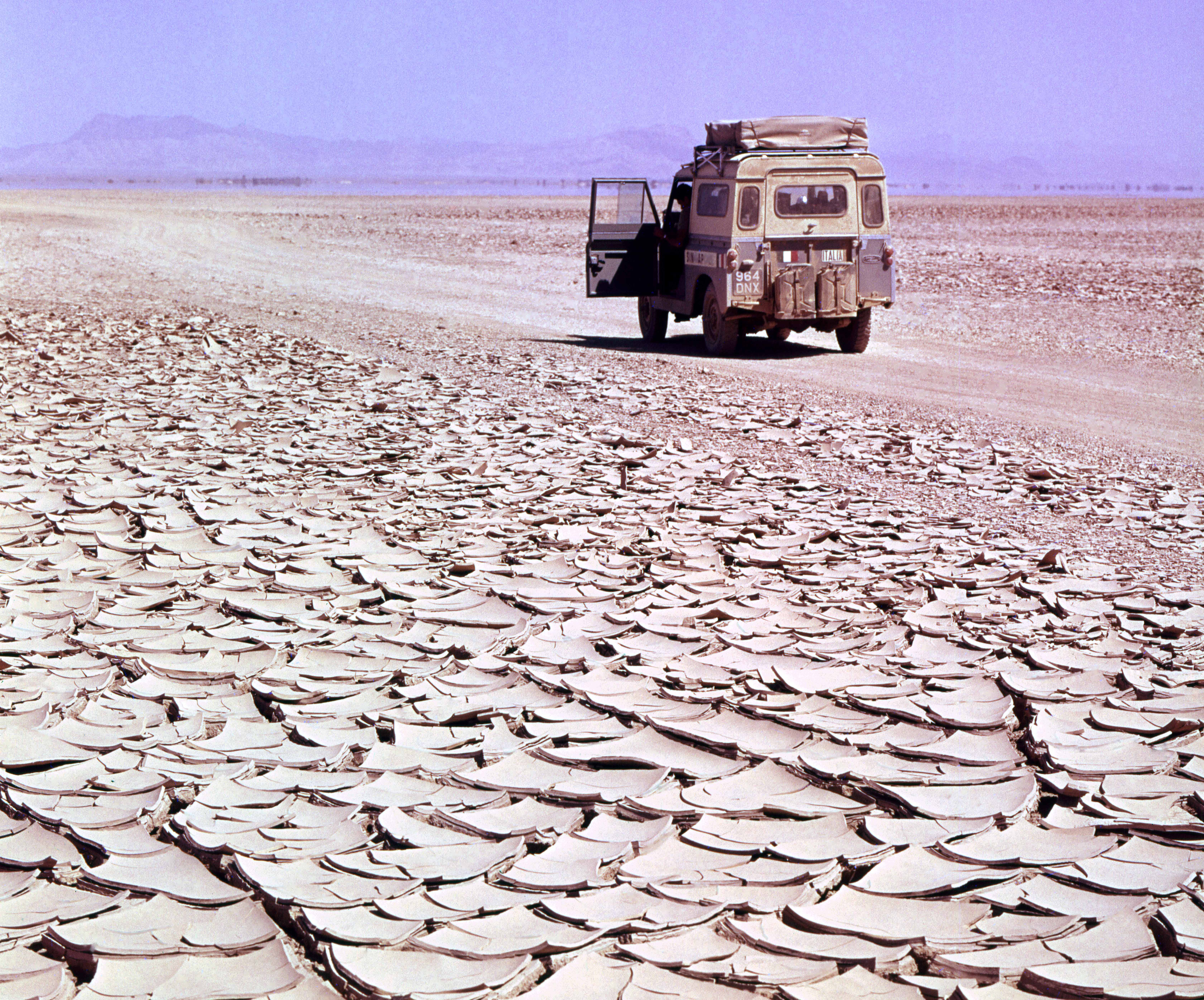
Nino Cirani in Iran, in the area of Krairabad

After attending the Faculty of Architecture in Milan, he made numerous off-road trips in Europe, Asia, Africa, America, and Oceania between the 1960s and 1980s, documenting them in photographs and publications. His explorations, photos, and reportages brought him fame in the 4x4 world, and his name and his cars (which he named "Aziza," meaning "cute" in Arabic) are often cited by experts in the field. Photos taken by him were published in the Enciclopedia delle Meraviglie della Terra (Encyclopedia of the Wonders of the Earth) on Asia and Africa (Vallardi 1964 and 1965) and in the Enciclopedia e Guida Turistica d'Italia (Encyclopedia and Tourist Guide of Italy), all in color (De Agostini 1955). De Agostini also used his photos for the volumes Armi da caccia (Hunting Weapons, 1967) and Parchi nazionali (National Parks, 1978).

=== Travels ===
In total, he traveled approximately 600,000 kilometers and visited 102 countries around the world. They are all documented in his autobiographical book Il Raid – Come, Dove, Quando (The Raid – How, Where, When), published in 1973 by Editoriale Domus. These are:

- 1962: Italy - Singapore. Land Rover 88 (Aziza 1).
- 1964-65: first crossing of Africa from South to North. Land Rover 109 (Aziza 2).
- 1968-69: Alaska - Tierra del Fuego. Land Rover 109, 103,000 kilometers (Aziza 3). During this trip he wrote articles for the De Agostini Geographic Institute and Quattroruote.
- 1972: first reconnaissance of the Sahara. Land Rover 109 (Aziza 3).
- 1973-74: second reconnaissance of the Sahara. Land Rover 109 (Aziza 3).

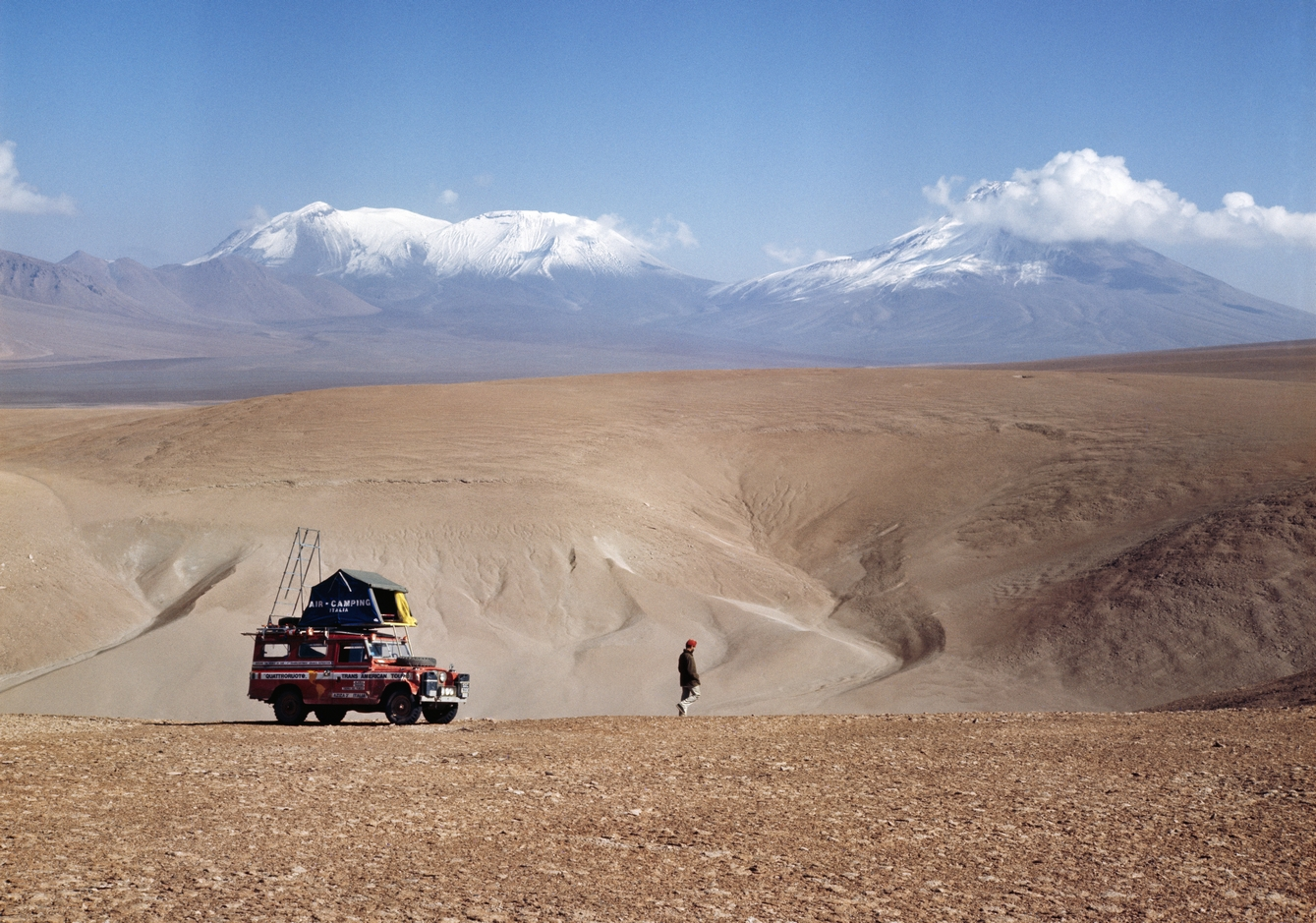
Nino Cirani in Argentina, at the Paso de Huaitiquina

- 1974-75: third reconnaissance of the Sahara. Land Rover 109 (Aziza 3).
- 1975-76: Italy-Sri Lanka. The De Agostini Geographic Institute again commissioned a series of photographs of Asia. Ford Transit (Aziza 4).
- 1976-77: fourth reconnaissance of the Sahara. Land Rover 109 (Aziza 3).
- 1977-78: second crossing of Africa. Land Rover 109 (Aziza 3).
- 1978-79: Australia-New Zealand. Fiat Campagnola (Aziza 5). Trip sponsored by Fiat, Alitalia, the De Agostini Geographic Institute, and Quattroruote.
- 1979-80: fifth reconnaissance of the Sahara. Land Rover 109 (Aziza 3).

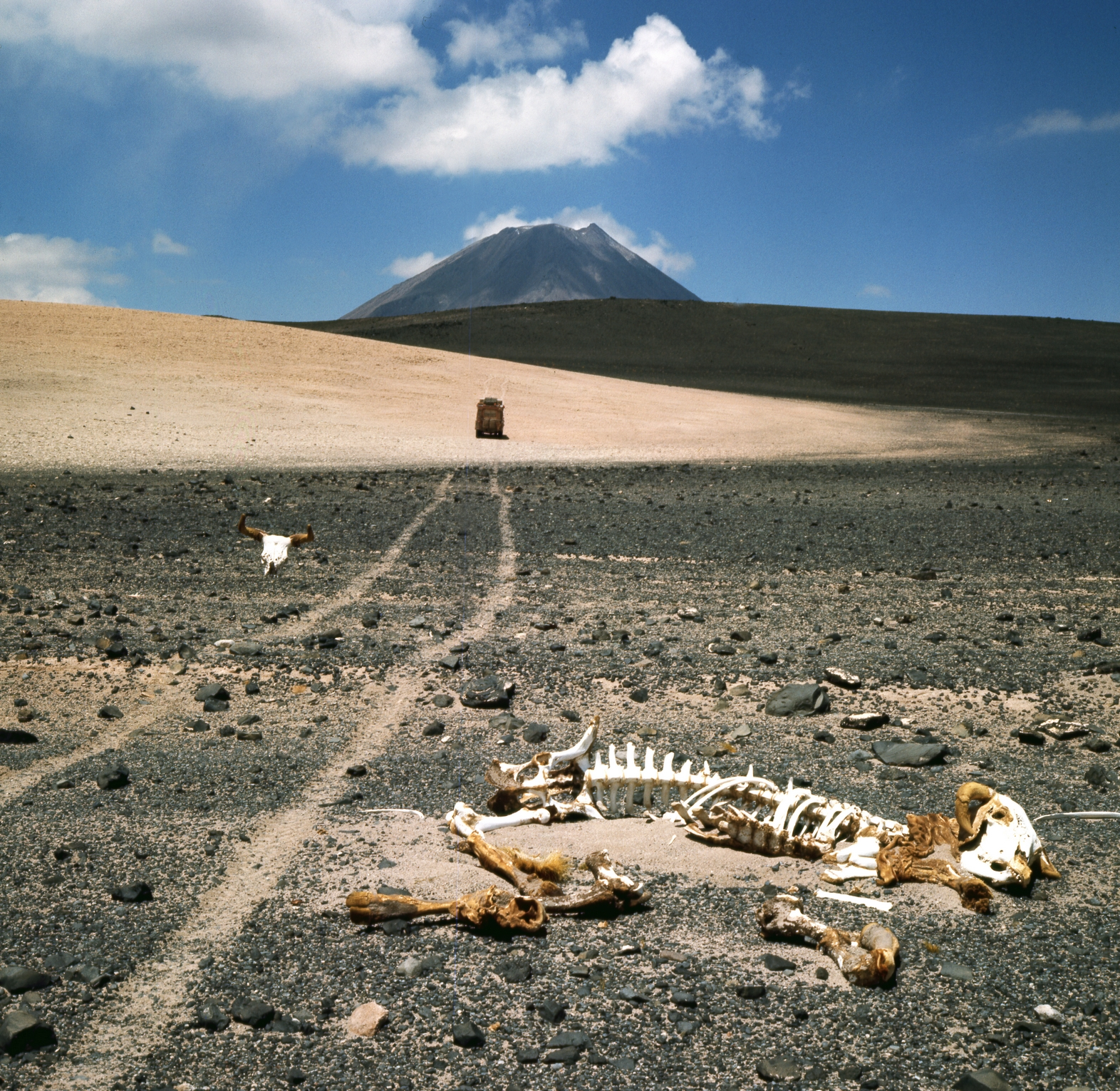
Nino Cirani in Argentina, in the Andes

- 1980: Italy-North Cape-Iceland. UAZ 452 (Aziza 6).

=== The 6 Azizas ===
On the road to Abu Simbel, in the Nubian Desert, south of Aswan, Cirani passed a huge Egyptian army truck. The soldier behind the wheel laughed at Cirani's little Land Rover and exclaimed "aziza!", which in Arabic means "pretty," an adjective given to young, beautiful women. Thus was born the series of the 6 Azizas: 3 Land Rovers (an 88 model and two 109s), a Fiat Campagnola, a Ford Transit, and the last, a UAZ 452.

Cirani designed all his own cars, as well as, on commission in the last years of his life, those for rally enthusiasts.

The various Aziza cars have always been the subject of curiosity, published in newspapers and magazines.

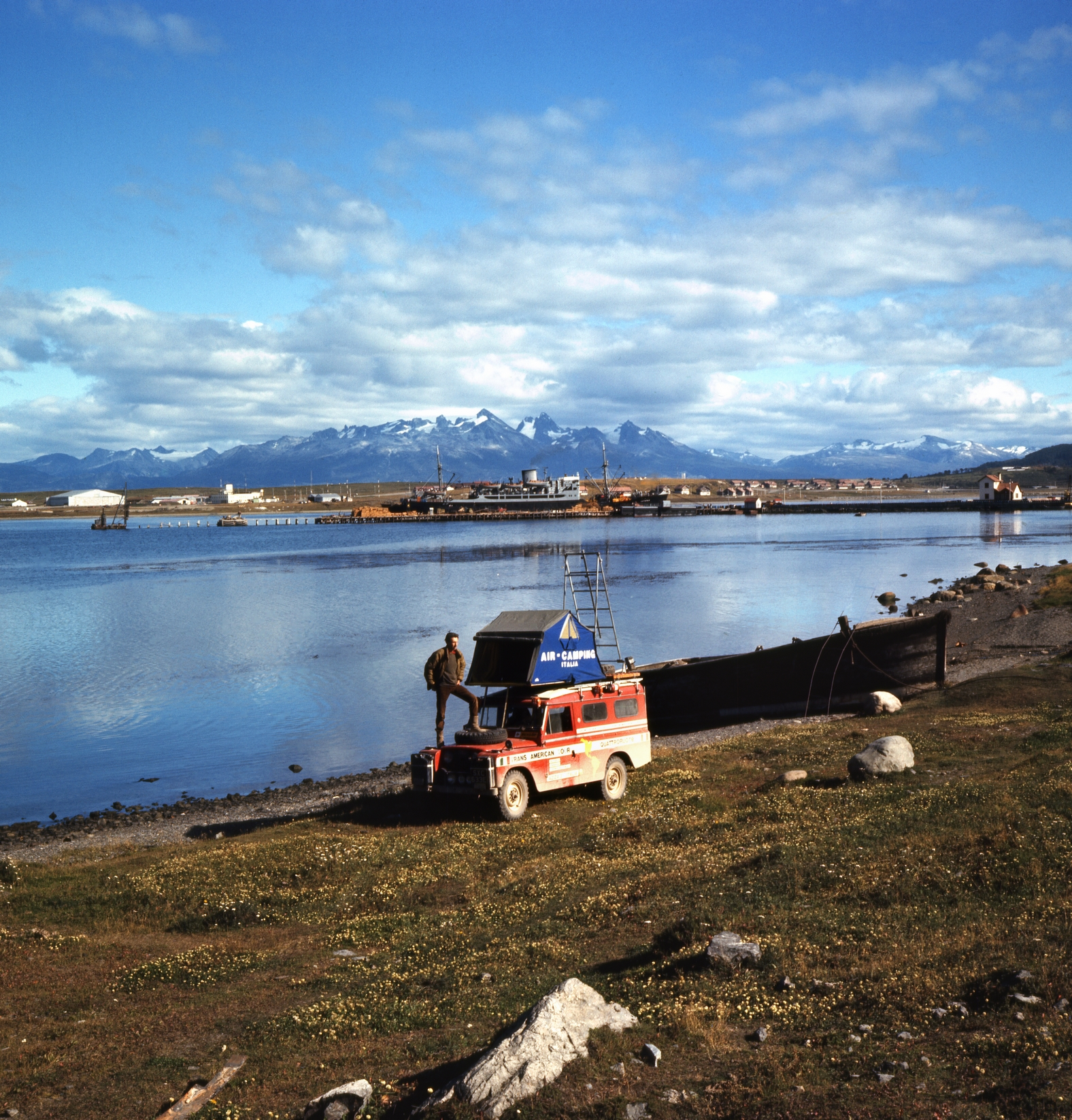
Nino Cirani in Ushuaia, Argentina

In particular, the Aziza 3 (protagonist of the Alaska-Tierra del Fuego rally) was reproduced as a model by Mebetoys (1:43 scale). Land Rover 109 Aziza Mebetoys 1/43 Orange | eBay UK, from Polistil (1:25), from Bburago (1:24 and 1:25 metal kit) and from Esci (1:24).

==== The Aziza 3 ====
The third of the Aziza series is the one with which Cirani became known in Italy and around the world: the red Land Rover.

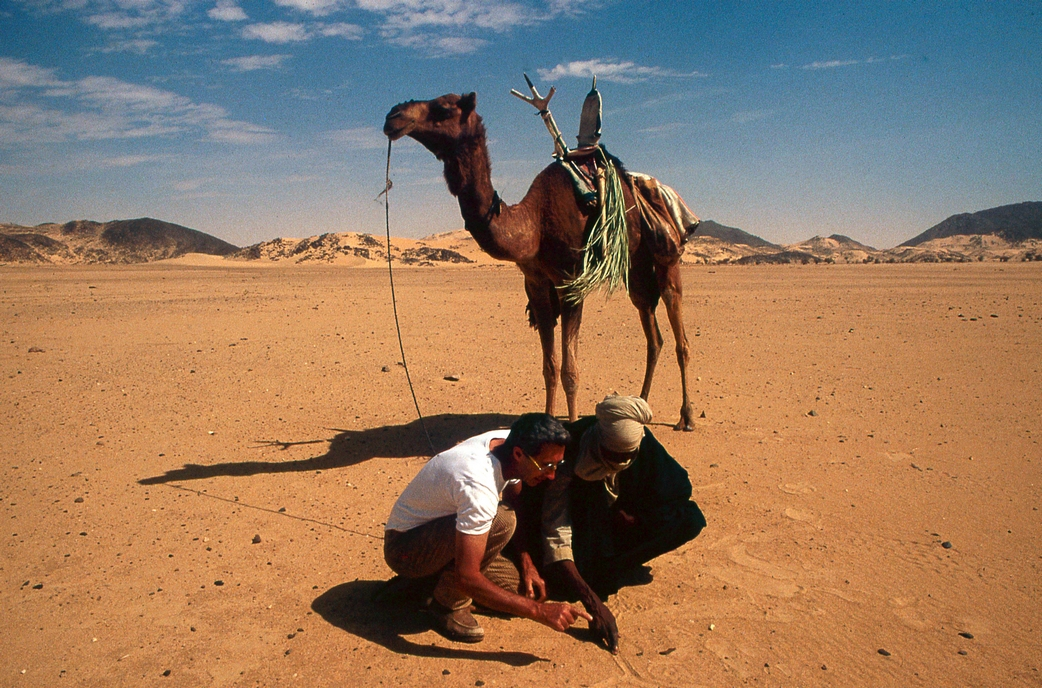
Nino Cirani in the Sahara

Purchased new in 1967 in London (because it wasn't available in red in Italy), imported with English registration (SXC 633E), the Aziza 3 is a 109 SW petrol model, 2nd series (long wheelbase), four-cylinder 2286 cc engine with a power output of 77 HP.

Cirani designed it down to the smallest detail (he wanted a vehicle “as it should be” and not, as usual, “as it could be done”), without worrying about expense or time (it took him 1,500 hours). He prepared the Aziza 3 for the “Alaska-Tierra del Fuego” raid in 8 months of work. In this, Cirani can be seen as a pioneer. In his book Il Raid – Come, Dove, Quando he dedicates a separate chapter to the preparation of this vehicle.

=== Photographer ===
During his professional career, Nino Cirani collected approximately 200,000 photographs, all in color. The fruit of this period is the Cirani Archive, which allowed him to license images, often previously unseen, to clients such as Vallardi, the De Agostini Geographic Institute, the Treccani Encyclopedia, Fabbri Editori, Mondadori, Rizzoli, and Garzanti.

As for his photographic equipment, Cirani switched from the twin-lens Rolleiflex to the Plaubel Makina 6X9 in 1955, and then, in 1960, to the Linhof Technika 6X9 (for architecture and interiors, with eight Schneider lenses, from 45mm to 360mm) and the first Zenza Bronica 6X6 with prism (for landscapes and portraits) equipped with eight Nikkor or Zenzanon lenses, from 40mm to 500mm.

==== Presentations ====
In 1975, at the Genoa Boat Show, Cirani's photographic reportage From Alaska to Tierra del Fuego was shown for the first time. It consisted of approximately 220 6x6 slides that the author cut in half and projected from two devices positioned at the top left and right of the room so that the image on the screen was twice as large. Cirani commented on his photos one by one live.

After a further screening (March 8, 1990, at the Hotel dei Cavalieri in Milan), and after his passing in 1998, Paolo Solari Bozzi and his wife Giuse organized three screenings of the raid in his memory.

1. April 26, 1999, Auditorium del Leone XIII, Milan;
2. May 27, 2010, same location, with an exhibition of the Aziza 3;
3. September 26, 2015, Auditorium of the National Automobile Museum, Turin – where the Aziza 3 was recently included.

== Honours ==
There are many tributes and celebrations of Cirani in the off-road and exploration fields:

- The National Automobile Museum in Turin hosts the Aziza 3;
- Autohome, a company specializing in car tents, has a line dedicated to him;
- Various retrospective articles on Cirani and the Land Rovers he used have been published over the years in specialized magazines, but also in general newspapers
