= 1961 Bogoroditsk Il-18 incident =

1961 aviation accident

Accident
- Date: 22 June 1961
- Summary: Belly landing due to engine fire
- Site: near Bogoroditsk

Aircraft
- Aircraft type: Ilyushin Il-18B
- Operator: Aeroflot/Moscow
- Registration: CCCP-75672
- Flight origin: Vnukovo Airport, Moscow
- Destination: Adler/Sochi Airport, Sochi
- Passengers: 89
- Crew: 8
- Fatalities: 0
- Survivors: 97

The 1961 Bogoroditsk Il-18 incident is an air incident in the USSR that happened on Thursday June 22, 1961, near the town of Bogoroditsk, Tula Oblast, involving an Il-18B aircraft of the Aeroflot company. All 97 on board survived.

== Aircraft ==
The aircraft was an Il-18B with number 75672 (factory 189000901 and serial 009-01), built at the factory of the Moscow Aircraft Production Association in 1959. It was transferred to the General Directorate of the Civil Air Fleet and later transferred to Aeroflot.

== Incident ==
The plane was on a flight from Moscow to Sochi. Its crew consisted of the commander Boris Evgenievich Gratsianov, 2nd pilot Yuri Nikolaevich Belkin, navigator Boris Anatolievich Andreev, flight mechanic Georgiy Dmitrievich Postribailo, and radio operator G. Y. Margulis.

Flying over Tula Oblast, a fire alarm went off for engine three. The crew activated the fire extinguishing system, but it didn't work. At the time, flight instructions contained no descriptions of this kind of situation. The nearest airfield was the Yefremov air base, 9 km south-east of the town of Yefremov, that was reachable in several minutes, but the crew decided there wasn't enough time, so they attempted a forced landing on fields below them in an emergency descent.

While on fire, Il-18 leveled with the ground, and the crew turned off the remaining engines. With the landing gear up, the plane belly landed in an oat field in the Bogoroditsky District of Tula oblast, slid for 300 meters, and came to a stop. The fire was extinguished quickly; all of the 97 people on board survived. The cause of the fire was destruction of the generator, debris from which damaged the oil line.

For their inventiveness and courage, the Kremlin awarded all of the crew members: Commander Gratsianov — Order of the Red Banner of Labour; 2nd pilot Belkin — Order of Red Star; navigator Andreev — Order of Red Star; flight mechanic Postribailo — Order of Red Star; radio operator Margulis — Order of the Badge of Honor; stewardesses Zhuravleva, Pokhitonova and Smirnova — Medal "For Distinguished Labour". The damaged plane was repaired and transferred to Riga Civil Aviation Engineers Institute as a training airframe.

== See also ==
- List of accidents and incidents involving the Ilyushin Il-18
- Aeroflot accidents and incidents in the 1960s
