= Abu Simbel (village) =

Village in Egypt

Coordinates: 22°21′N 31°37′E

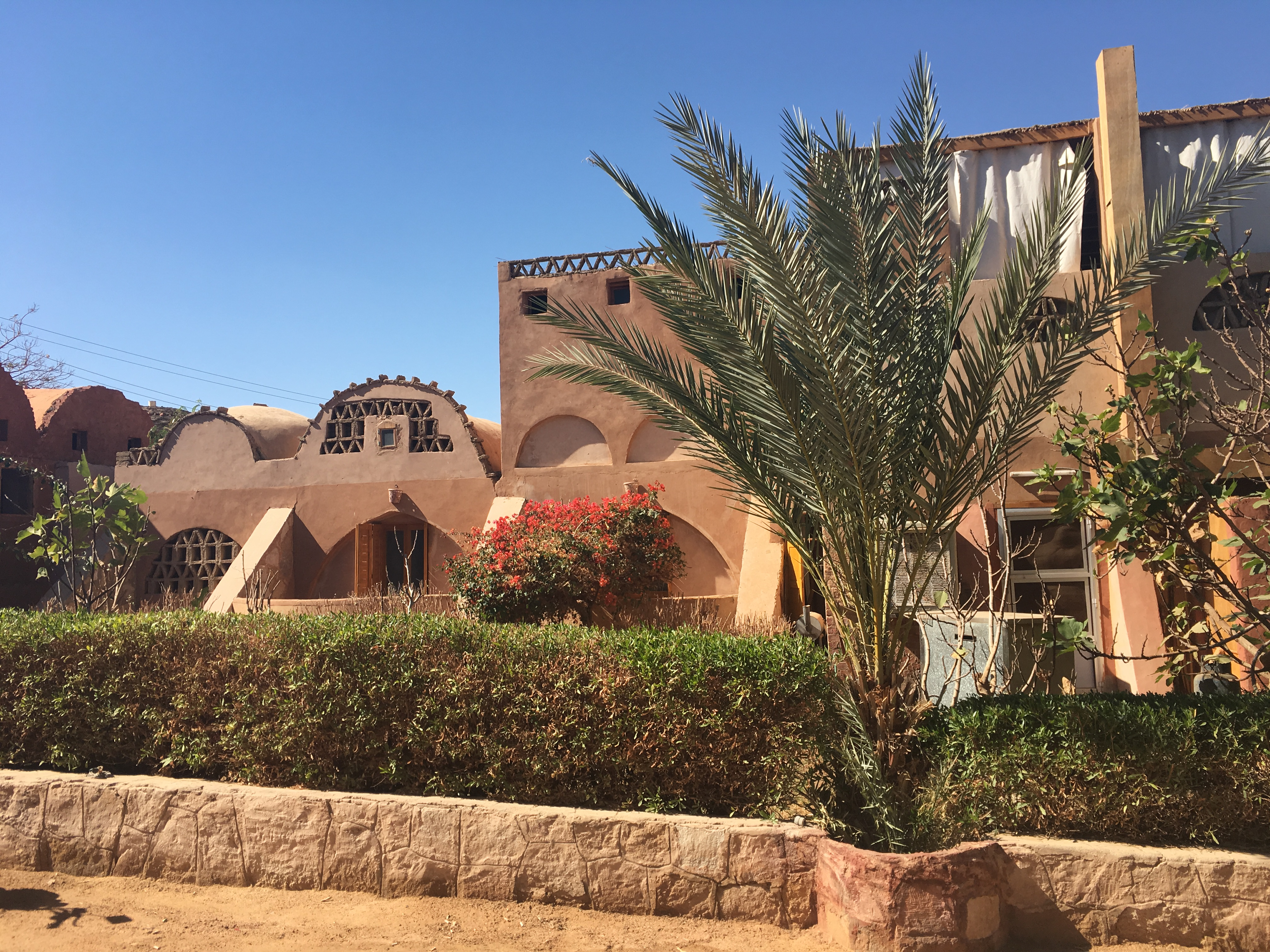
Abu Simbel in 2017

Abu Simbel (also Abu Simbal, Ebsambul or Isambul; Arabic: أبو سنبل, romanized: Abū Sinbal or Arabic: أبو سمبل, romanized: Abū Simbal) is a village in the Egyptian part of Nubia, located approximately 240 km (150 mi) southwest of Aswan and near the Egypt–Sudan border. As of 2012, it has about 2,600 inhabitants. It is best known as the site of the Abu Simbel temples, which were built by King Ramses II.

== Name ==
The name Abu Simbel, or Abu Sunbul in Modern Standard Arabic, is derived from the ancient place name Ipsambul. During the New Kingdom period, the region where the temple was built may have been called Meha, although this is not certain. Approximately 20 km (12 mi) southwest of Abu Simbel was the small village of Ibshek, located slightly north of the Cataracts of the Nile, in present-day Sudan (Wadi Halfa Salient). This area is now flooded by Lake Nubia and is near the border with Egypt.

== Location and climate ==
Abu Simbel is located in Southern Egypt, close to the Egypt–Sudan border. It is administratively part of the Aswan Governorate. The Sudanese border is only about 20 km (12 mi) away to the southwest; here, the border deviates from the 22nd parallel north and forms the Wadi Halfa Salient. However, the course of the border in this area is disputed, as Egypt claims the territory of the Wadi Halfa Salient up to the 22nd parallel in the south. The nearest city, Wadi Halfa, is located 65 km (40 mi) southwest of Abu Simbel within Sudanese territory, on the east bank of Lake Nubia (the Sudanese name for Lake Nasser). Like the Temple of Abu Simbel, the city was relocated to higher ground due to flooding caused by the filling of the reservoir.

Abu Simbel is connected to the governorate capital, Aswan, by a road that passes west of Lake Nasser through the Libyan Desert. This road is primarily used by tour buses transporting visitors to the Abu Simbel temples but also serves the irrigation projects in the desert areas near the reservoir. Lake Nasser is navigable, making Abu Simbel also accessible by boat. A few cruise ships navigate the lake upstream of the Aswan Dam. The village can also be reached by air via the Abu Simbel Airport.

Abu Simbel is situated in one of the warmest and driest regions of Egypt. During the summer months, average high temperatures easily reach 40 °C (104 °F). Despite significant temperature differences between day and night, summer temperatures seldom fall below 20 °C (68 °F). Winters are mild with highs around 25 °C (77 °F), although nighttime temperatures can occasionally drop below 10 °C (50 °F). Precipitation is so rare that it is impossible to define a "rainy season" for Abu Simbel. The moisture-bearing Intertropical Convergence Zone may on rare occasions come close enough to pose a threat of rain, as occurred in early August 2024.

Historically, Abu Simbel was located on the west bank of the Nile between the first and second Cataracts of the Nile. Cataracts are rapids caused by boulders or rock sills that made navigation difficult for Nile ships, especially during baseflow. Today, both cataracts near Aswan and Wadi Halfa are covered by Lake Nasser, named after Gamal Abdel Nasser, Egyptian president from 1954 to 1970.

== History ==
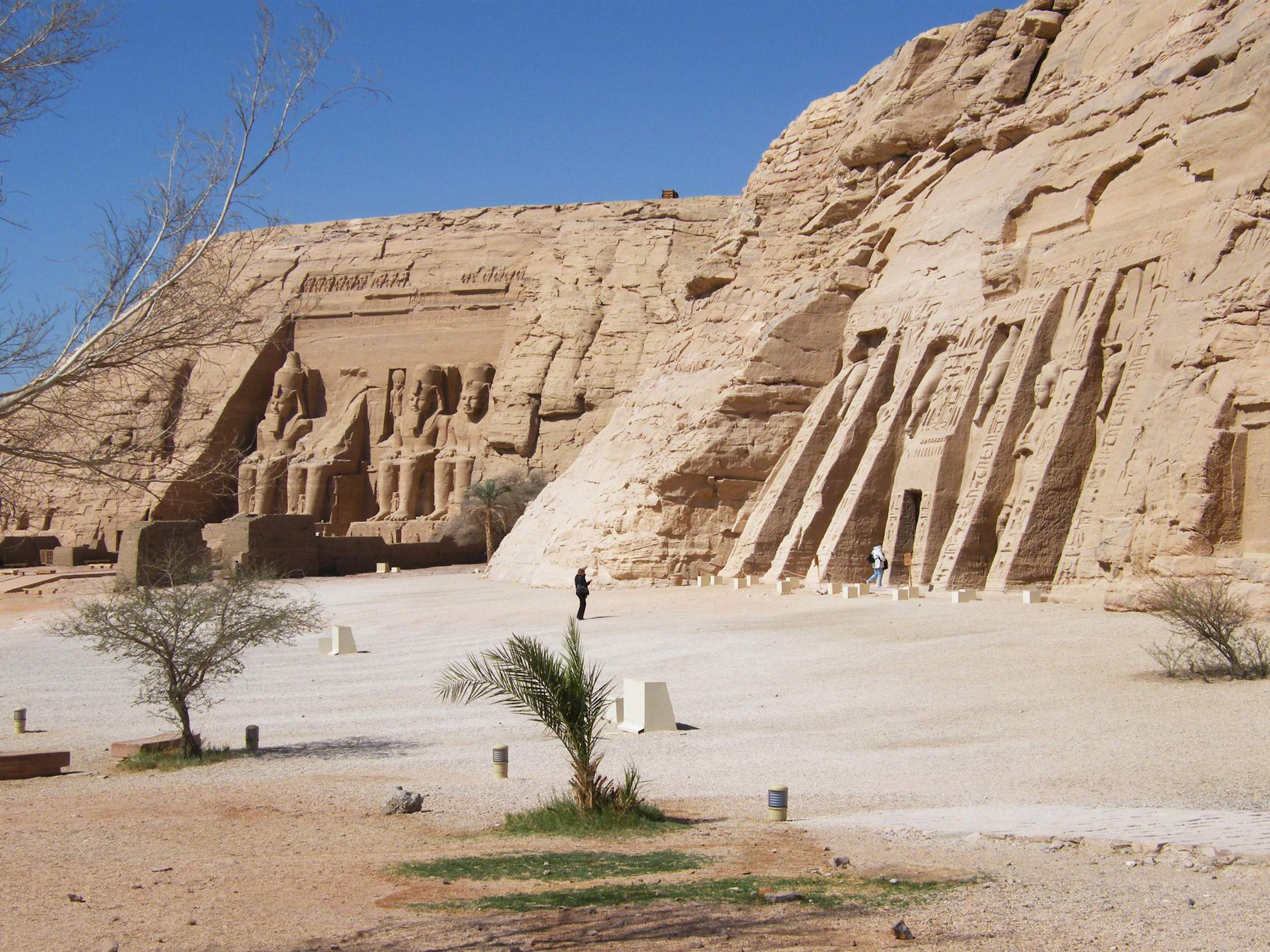
The Abu Simbel temples

=== Ancient Period ===
At the time of Ramses II, the southern border of the pharaohs' realm was located near these two cataracts. The construction of the Abu Simbel temple complex there was intended to demonstrate Egypt's power and enduring supremacy over the tributary region of Nubia.

The Great Temple at Abu Simbel, which took approximately twenty years to build, was completed around the 24th year of the reign of Ramesses the Great (corresponding to 1265 BC). It was dedicated to the gods Amun, Ra-Horakhty, and Ptah, as well as to the deified Ramesses himself. It is widely considered the grandest and one of the most beautiful temples commissioned during the reign of Ramesses II. The single entrance is flanked by four colossal statues, 20 m (66 ft) high, each representing Ramesses II seated on a throne and wearing the double crown of Upper and Lower Egypt. The statue immediately to the left of the entrance was damaged by an earthquake, causing its head and torso to fall off; these fallen pieces were not reattached during the relocation but were placed at the statue's feet in their original discovered positions. Next to Ramesses's legs are several smaller statues, none taller than the pharaoh's knees, depicting: his chief wife, Nefertari Meritmut; his queen mother Mut-Tuy; his first two sons, Amun-her-khepeshef and Ramesses B; and his first six daughters: Bintanath, Baketmut, Nefertari, Meritamen, Nebettawy, and Isetnofret.

The site was active throughout the 1st millennium BCE. This was evidenced by the presence of various signs on the overall structure. For example, in 593 BC, an inscription in Greek on the left leg of the statue of Ramses II detailed the military campaigns of King Psammetichus II (Psamtik II), testifying not only the activity in the site in the 6th Century BCE, but also the period's cultural exchange between the Ancient Greek world and Ancient Egypt.

Other evidence of activities overtime in the area are the different kinds of graffiti on the two pairs of huge sculptures of Rameses II, referencing various Pharaohs over the ages, such as Psamtik I and Amasis II.

=== Contemporary Period ===
In 1813, Swiss explorer Johann Ludwig Burckhard, uncovered the site, noticing the heads of the colossal statues which were partially buried.

Giovanni Belzoni, the Italian counterpart of Johann Ludwig Burckhard, revisited the site in 1817, succeeding in his attempt to enter the complex, which had previously failed in 1813. He then took away everything value he could get a hold of.

The construction of the new dam flooded all of Lower Nubia, displacing its inhabitants, most of whom were resettled in the areas of Aswan and Kom Ombo. Only in Abu Simbel was a new village developed, complete with a hotel and airport. This is thanks to an immense UNESCO International Campaign from 1960 to 1980 to preserve the site from flooding, which was successful, thus saving the local tourist industry. In fact, due to a lack of agricultural land, the entire population now relies on tourism. Since the turn of the millennium, various projects have been initiated with the goal of making elevated desert regions fertile using water from the lake.

== Transportation ==
- Abu Simbel Airport

== See also ==
- List of ancient Egyptian towns and cities
- Aboccis
