= Abu Simbel Airport =

Airport in Egypt

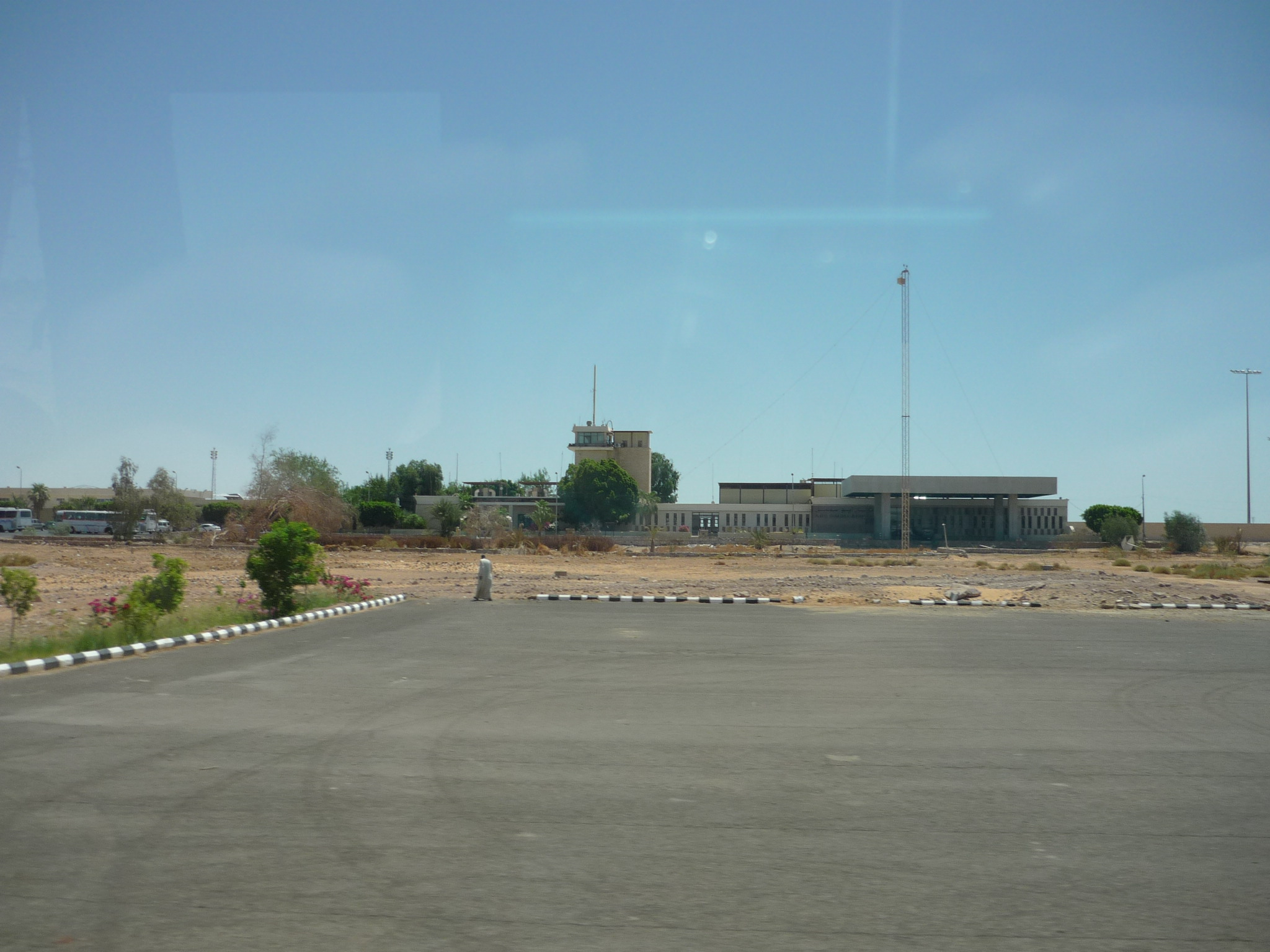
- IATA: ABS; ICAO: HEBL

Summary
- Airport type: Public
- Operator: Government
- Serves: Abu Simbel, Egypt
- Elevation AMSL: 616 ft / 188 m
- Coordinates: 22°22′33.3″N 31°36′41.9″E

Map
- Location of airport in Egypt

Runways
Direction	Length		Surface
Direction	m	ft	Surface
15/33	3,000	9,843	Asphalt

Statistics (2006)
- Passengers: 499,172

Abu Simbel Airport (IATA: ABS, ICAO: HEBL) is a regional airport in Abu Simbel, Egypt. It also serves the Abu Simbel village. In 2011, it served 119,326 passengers (-75.6% vs. 2010).

== Airlines and destinations ==
Airlines	Destinations
Air Cairo	Aswan, Cairo
Egyptair	Aswan, Cairo

== See also ==
- List of airports in Egypt
