= 2000 Batumi Ilyushin Il-18 crash =

2000 aviation accident in Russia

- A Russian Air Force Ilyushin Il-18D similar to the one involved.

Accident
- Date: 25 October 2000
- Summary: Controlled flight into terrain due to pilot error and ATC error
- Site: near Batumi International Airport, Batumi, Georgia

Aircraft
- Aircraft type: Ilyushin Il-18D
- Operator: Russian Air Force
- Registration: RA-74295
- Flight origin: Chkalovskoye, Moscow, Russia
- Destination: Batumi International Airport, Batumi, Georgia
- Occupants: 84
- Passengers: 73
- Crew: 11
- Fatalities: 84
- Survivors: 0

On 25 October 2000, an Ilyushin Il-18D belonging to the Russian Ministry of Defense crashed into Mount Mtirala while landing in rainy and low-visibility condition. The flight originated from Moscow, Russia and was scheduled to arrived at Batumi, Georgia, carrying 73 passengers (including 45 serviceman, 21 women and 7 children), 11 crew members and 1,700 kg of mail. All 84 on board were killed in the disaster.

On board of the flight was the former Deputy Chief of the Air Force General Staff for Flight Operations as well as the retired Lieutenant General, Nikolai Grigoruk.

== Background ==
=== Aircraft ===
The aircraft involved was an Ilyushin Il-18D, manufactured in 1968 and registered as RA-74295. At the time of the accident, the plane had accumulated 15,256 flight hours and 7,694 cycles.

=== Crew member ===
- Alexander Kotov, born in 1967
- Oleg Urin, born in 1970
- Roman Strashnikov, born in 1977
- Evgeny Koryakovtsev, born in 1976
- Valery Osyko, born in 1961
- Vladimir Afanasyev, born in 1967
- Alexander Avkhimena, born in 1967
- Leonid Ponomarev, born in 1962
- Alexander Blagodarov, born in 1967
- Sergei Savichev, born in 1968
- Andrei Staroverov, born in 1968

== Accident ==
During the approach to Batumi Airport, the captain, due to low clouds over the sea, decided to land from the mountains. While descending through the clouds from an altitude of 3,000 meters (9,840 feet), the Il-18 deviated significantly from its landing course, but the air traffic controllers failed to warn the crew, possibility due to the airport's radio navigation equipment malfunction. At 5:22 PM, while descending at an altitude of 940 meters (3,080 feet), the aircraft struck Mount Mtirala 12 kilometers away from the airport, at the speed of 340 km/h (183 knots). The impact completely destroyed the aircraft.

== Investigation ==
The investigation was conducted under the co-operation of Georgian and Russian experts, including the IAC experts, haede by Secretary of the Russian Security Council, Sergei Ivanov.

According to the investigation, the plane crash was caused by the fault of the four deceased pilots and the negligence of two air traffic controllers: Vladimir Alaverdov and Rudiko Verdzeuli. An analysis of the black box data from the accidental plane has shown that the aircraft's technical systems were functioning normally. After reporting the position, the pilots violated several points of navigation regulations that led to the deviation. Vladimir Alaverdov did not inform Rudiko Verdzeuli about the plane's exact coordinate; Rudiko Verdzeuli then permits the plane to land without proper cross-check.

== Aftermath ==
Russian president Vladimir Putin at a memorial service for those who died in the crash on October 29

=== Memorial ===
By decree of the president of Georgian then, Eduard Shevardnadze, October 27 was declared a day of mourning in the country. President of Russia, Vladimir Putin, did not declare a day of mourning on this day, citing that not all the victims had yet been found and identified.

=== Compensation ===
Family members of the aircraft crew have received 66 payments totaling 2,9 million rubles. Payments to the families of the service members killed in the plane crash will be paid 25 or 120, if the members were on active duty, times the salary of a service member. In total, 13.6 million rubles.

In connection with the loss of the Il-18 aircraft, the Military Insurance Company has paid insurance compensation in the amount of 1,65 million rubles to the Ministry of Defense of the Russian Federation.

=== Il-18 ground ===
Following this accident and the crash of IRS Aero Flight 9601/02, the Il-18 was banned for passenger operations.
