= Aeroflot Flight 6551 =

1973 Aeroflot Il-18 crash

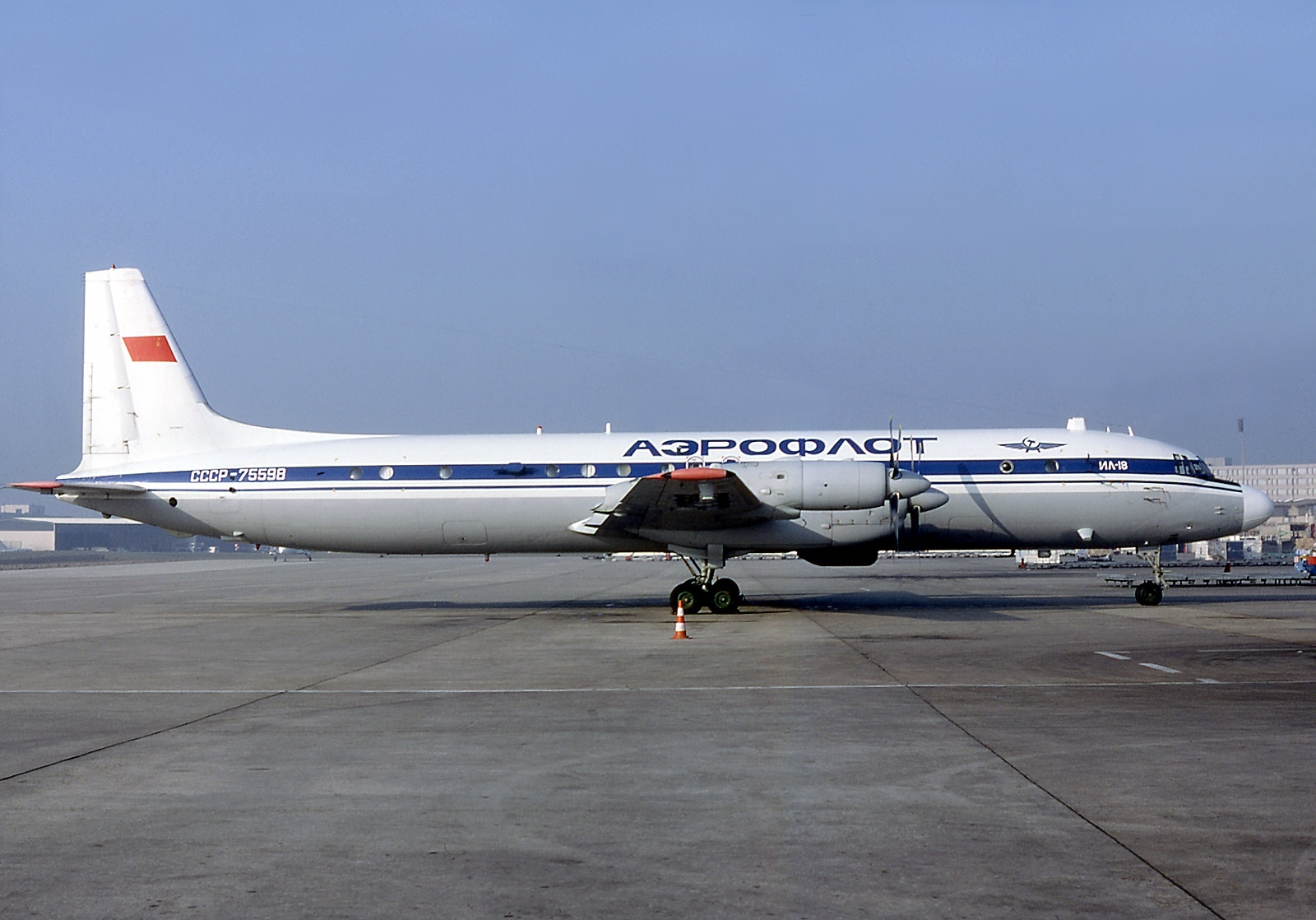
- An Aeroflot Ilyushin Il-18, similar to the one involved in the accident

Accident
- Date: 11 May 1973
- Summary: Loss of control; cause undetermined
- Site: 84 km south of Semipalatinsk, Kazakh SSR, USSR; 49°35′30″N 80°23′0″E

Aircraft
- Aircraft type: Ilyushin Il-18B
- Operator: Aeroflot
- Registration: СССР-75687
- Flight origin: Bina Airport, Baku, Azerbaijan SSR
- Stopover: Tashkent Airport, Tashkent, Uzbek SSR
- Destination: Severny Airport, Novosibirsk, Russian SFSR
- Occupants: 63
- Passengers: 55
- Crew: 8
- Fatalities: 63
- Survivors: 0

Aeroflot Flight 6551 (Russian: Рейс 6551 Аэрофлота Reys 6551 Aeroflota) was a scheduled domestic passenger flight on an Ilyushin Il-18B from Baku to Novosibirsk with a stopover in Tashkent that crashed on 11 May 1973 over Semipalatinsk in the Kazakh SSR, killing all 63 people aboard.

== Aircraft ==
The aircraft involved in the accident was an Ilyushin Il-18B registered CCCP-75687 to the Azerbaijan division of Aeroflot. Built in 1959, by the time of the accident the aircraft had sustained 21,663 flight hours and 11,787 pressurization cycles. Initially the cabin layout was designed to seat 80 passengers but later was converted to an 89 passenger configuration.

== Crew ==
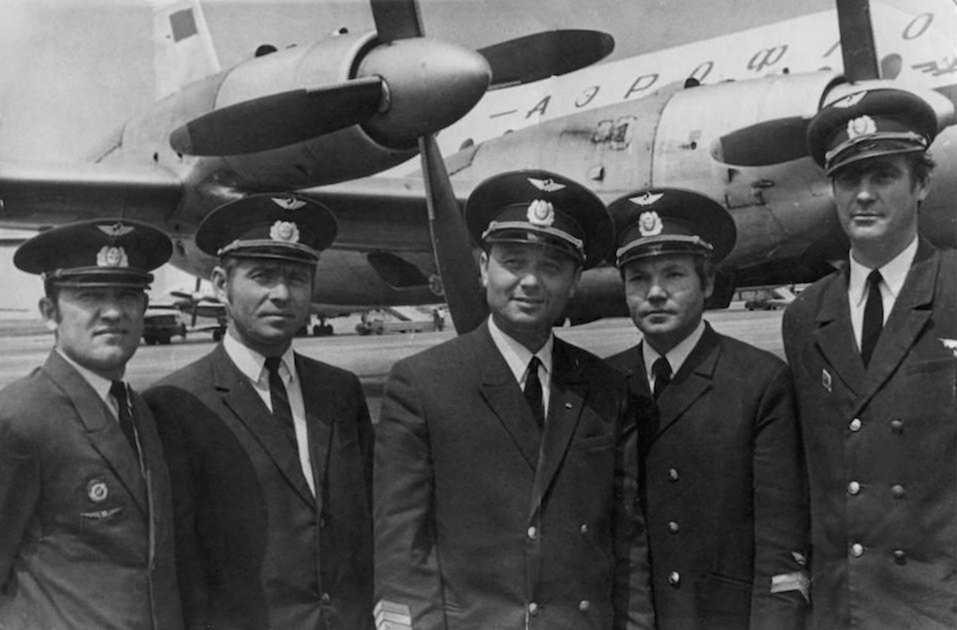
Left to right: Radio operator Dmitry Markin, first officer Yuri Filin, Captain Viktor Loginov, flight engineer Valentin Pershin, and navigator Viktor Filatov; photo taken at Bina Airport in 1972.

Eight crew members were aboard the flight. The cockpit crew consisted of:

- Captain – Viktor Sergeyevich Loginov
- Co-pilot – Yuri Aleksandrovich Filin
- Flight engineer – Valentin Nikolayevich Pershin
- Navigator – Viktor Mikhaylovich Filatov
- Radio operator – Dmitry Korneyevich Markin

== Synopsis ==
The flight departed from Tashkent Airport on the May 10 at 23:25 Moscow time (01:25 May 11 local time) with 63 people on board, including three children. The aircraft leveled at a cruising altitude of 7,800 metres (25,600 ft) after takeoff until they were instructed by the Almaty Airport region controller at 00:56 MSK to increase altitude to a flight level of 9,000 metres (30,000 ft) and fly on a bearing of 43 degrees; the flight crew confirmed receiving the instruction and proceeded to ascend as directed. At 01:12 MSK the flight briefly contacted the Ayaguz airport controller and again at 01:22 to inform him they were about to depart the Ayaguz sector and head over to Semipalatinsk. After contacting the Semipalatinsk controller the flight proceeded to decrease altitude to 7,800 metres (25,600 ft) by initiating a 360-degree left turn; the aircraft was last seen on radar 110 kilometres (68 mi; 59 nmi) from Semipalatinsk but had been in flight 90 kilometres (56 mi; 49 nmi) from the airport, not detected by radar. The Semipalatinsk controller attempted to make contact with the plane when it was due to be overhead at 01:52 MSK (04:52 local time) but received no response from the flight. At the time the weather consisted of clouds at altitudes of 1,000–1,300 metres (3,300–4,300 ft), mild wind and rain, with visibility at 10 kilometres (6.2 mi; 5.4 nmi).

At the time the Il-18 was flying on autopilot when within the span of six seconds the instrument speed decreased from 400 to 370 km/h (220 to 200 kn; 250 to 230 mph) while at its assigned altitude before entering a rapid decline with no lateral roll, reaching overloads ranging from 1.5 to -0.8g. 17 seconds later the plane entered a right bank with an angular velocity of more than 100 degrees per second, causing overloads that resulted in the loss of the right wing at an altitude of 5,000 metres (16,000 ft) while at a speed of 670 km/h (360 kn; 420 mph) and the breakup of the fuselage at an altitude of 3,600 metres (11,800 ft) at a speed of 700 km/h (380 kn; 430 mph), well above the maximum safe speed of an Il-18 (675 km/h (364 kn; 419 mph)). At 04:37 local time (01:37 Moscow time), 38 seconds after the start of the decline, the remains of the aircraft crashed into the steppe, 84 kilometres (52 mi; 45 nmi) south of Semipalatinsk. Investigators were able to reach the wreckage and view the burning debris by 04:50 local time, but all 63 people on the flight perished in the crash.

== Conclusions ==
Two local military units questioned by investigators reported that they had not fired any projectiles into the air around the time of the crash nor were there any air force aircraft in operation that could have collided with the flight. Investigators felt that the first altitude and speed of the 20–30 seconds of reduced altitude correlated with a controlled emergency reduction in altitude, followed by an unexplainable loss of control that led to an overspeed situation. Investigators thought that one of the reasons possible would have been a crew member unintentionally losing control of an elevator during an emergency descent, but it could not be conclusively confirmed. At the time of the rapid decline that led up to the accident, the propellers were feathered, but it is unknown if the crew had done so or if the autopilot had done so.

Two round puncture holes in the fuselage of the rear luggage compartment; investigators had the portion of the compartment recovered and sent for analysis to see if an artillery shell could have caused the damage, but analysis concluded that the holes resulted from the crash itself with a lack of explosive residues present. Despite the recovery of the flight data recorders and most of the wreckage, the commission was not able to pinpoint an exact cause of the crash, in part due to the amount of damage sustained by the flight data recorders limiting the amount of information that could be recovered.

== See also ==
- List of accidents and incidents involving the Ilyushin Il-18
- Aeroflot Flight 5484
- Aeroflot Flight 630
