= IRS Aero Flight 9601/02 =

2001 aviation accident in Russia

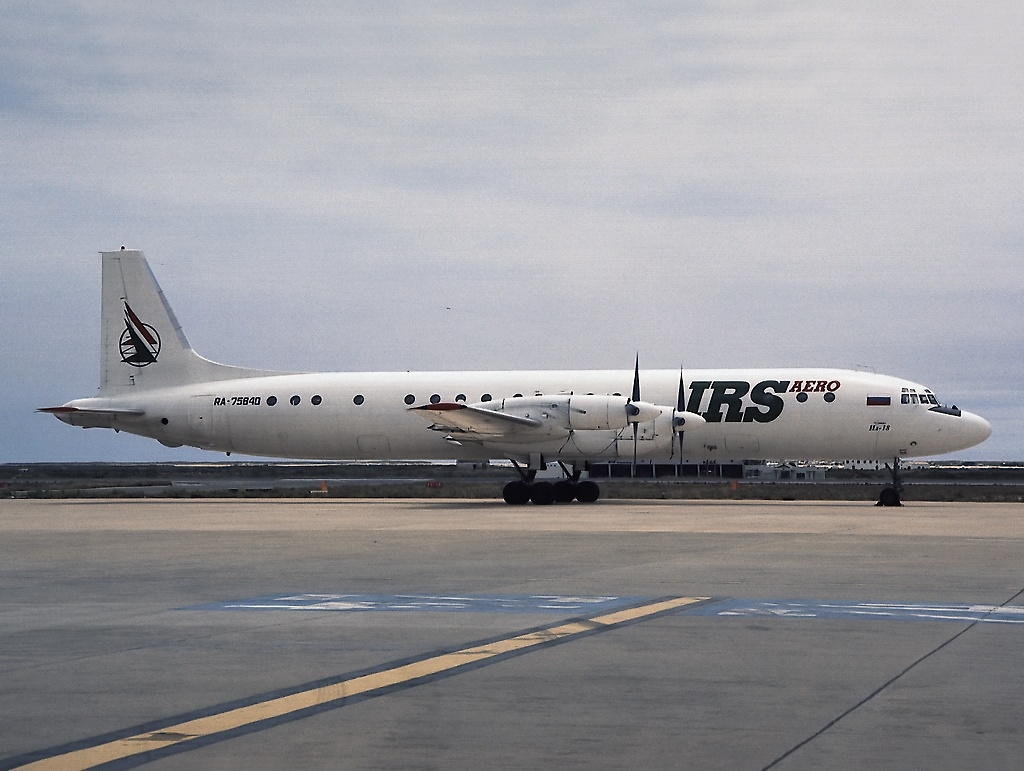
- RA-75840, the aircraft involved in the accident, photographed in 2000

Accident
- Date: 19 November 2001
- Summary: Loss of control due to poor maintenance
- Site: Kalyazin, Tver, Russia

Aircraft
- Aircraft type: Ilyushin Il-18V
- Operator: IRS Aero
- Registration: RA-75840
- Flight origin: Domodedovo Airport, Domodedovo, Russia
- 1st stopover: Khatanga Airport, Khatanga, Russia
- 2nd stopover: Krasnoyarsk International Airport, Krasnoyarsk, Russia
- 3rd stopover: Khatanga Airport, Khatanga, Russia
- 4th stopover: Tolmachevo Airport, Novosibirsk, Russia
- Last stopover: Khatanga Airport, Khatanga, Russia
- Destination: Domodedovo Airport, Domodedovo, Russia
- Occupants: 27
- Passengers: 18
- Crew: 9
- Fatalities: 27
- Survivors: 0

IRS Aero Flight 9601/02 was a domestic flight in Russia en routing Domodedovo - Khatanga - Krasnoyarsk - Khatanga - Novosibirsk - Khatanga - Domodedovo. On 19 November 2001, on its final leg, the Ilyushin Il-18V entered a nosedive and crashed near Kalyazin, killing all 27 on board.

Following the crash, the Il-18 was grounded from commercial service, imposed in 2002.

== Background ==
=== Aircraft ===
The aircraft involved was an Ilyushin Il-18V manufactured in 1962. Before the accident, the plane had accumulated 11,617 flight hours and 5,582 cycles.

=== Crew members ===
- Captain: Sominsky Alexander Nikolaevich
- Co-pilot: Mikhailov Vladislav Vyacheslavovich
- Navigator: Fedorishin Vladimir Fedorovich
- Flight mechanic: Kozhevin Aleksey Petrovich
- Flight attendant: Solovchuk Lyudmila Alekseevna
- Flight attendant: Yakovleva Oksana Anatolyevna
- Flight manager: Efremov Sergey Vladimirovich
- Technician: Kolupailo Gennady Ivanovich
- Technician: Kibets Yuri Andreevich

== Accident ==
The plane was cruising at 7,800 meters (25,590 feet) at 410 km/h (221 knots). At 21:17, the elevator suddenly shifted to nose-down position, causing the aircraft to plummet down. The speed increased to 610 km/h (329 knots). As the crew tried to recover from the nosedive, one of them accidentally hit the left pedal, which caused a left bank. With the speed of 850 km/h (459 knots), the aircraft suffered structural failure, partially disintegrated in the air. At 21:19, the plane crashed into the ground, killing all 18 passengers and 9 crew members on board.

== Investigation ==
The cause of the plane crash was concluded to be technical failure of the elevator caused by poor maintenance from safety violation of the maintenance, although the exact cause of the failure was never determined.

== See also ==
- ČSA Flight 511 (March 1961)
- Aeroflot Flight 6551
- Aeroflot Flight 630
- Aeroflot Flight 8641
- Aeroflot Flight 2022
