= 1969 Aswan Ilyushin Il-18 crash =

Aviation accident in Egypt

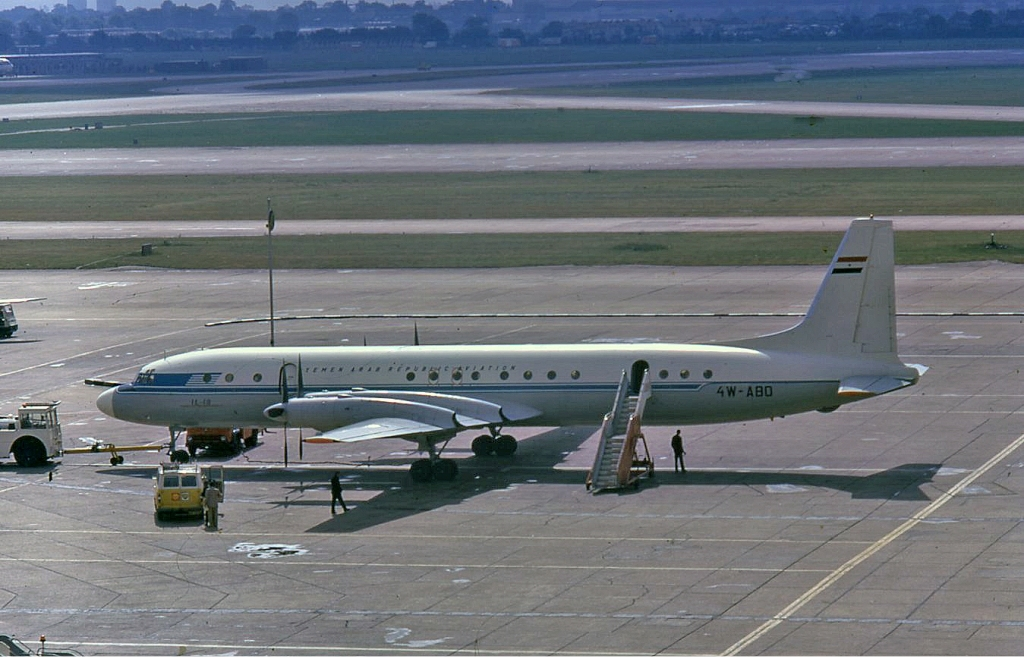
- An Ilyushin Il-18 similar to the accident aircraft.

Accident
- Date: 20 March 1969
- Summary: Pilot error in low visibility and poor weather
- Site: Aswan International Airport, Egypt; 23.958°N 32.820°E

Aircraft
- Aircraft type: Ilyushin Il-18D
- Operator: United Arab Airlines
- Registration: SU-APC
- Flight origin: King Abdullah Air Base, Saudi Arabia
- Destination: Aswan International Airport, Egypt
- Occupants: 105
- Passengers: 98
- Crew: 7
- Fatalities: 100
- Injuries: 5
- Survivors: 5

On 20 March 1969, an Ilyushin Il-18 operated by United Arab Airlines crashed while attempting to land at Aswan Airport, Egypt, killing 100 of the 105 passengers and crew on board.

== The crash ==
The flight was a non-scheduled international passenger service from Jeddah, Saudi Arabia to Aswan, Egypt, bringing Muslim Hajj pilgrims back from the holy city of Mecca. The flight arrived in darkness in the early morning, with visibility reduced to 2–3 kilometers due to a sandstorm. After two unsuccessful attempts to land, the aircraft was approaching for a third time when it banked to the right and hit the left side of the runway. The starboard wing tore off and a fuel spillage followed which caused the crashed aircraft to burst into flames.

== Cause ==
The probable cause was determined to be that the "Pilot descended below the minimum safe altitude without having the runway lights clearly in sight. A contributory factor was fatigue arising from continuous working hours without suitable rest periods."
