= Aswan International Airport =

Egyptian airport

Aswan International Airport مطار أسوان الدولي
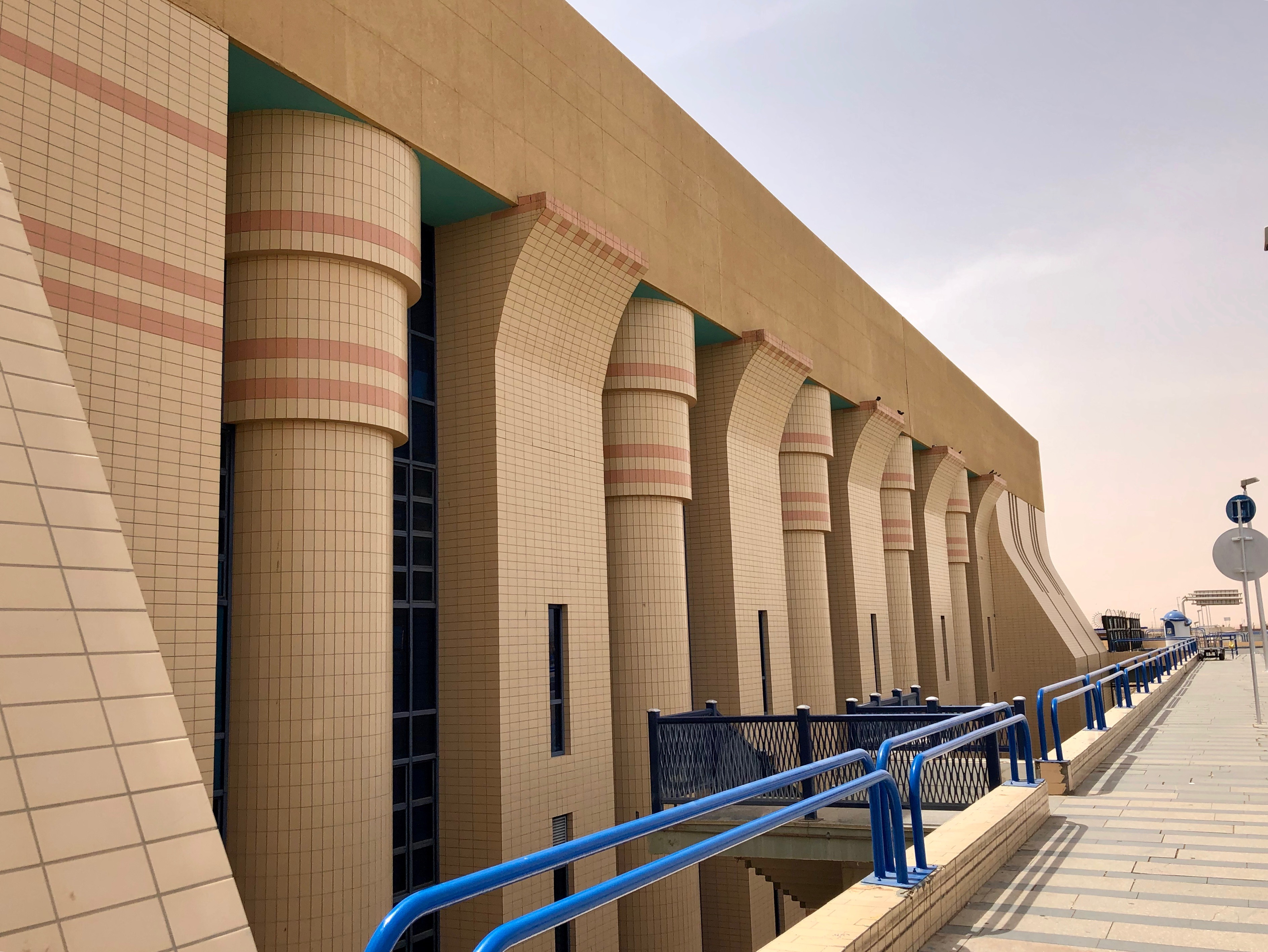
- IATA: ASW; ICAO: HESN

Summary
- Airport type: Public
- Operator: Government
- Serves: Aswan, Egypt
- Elevation AMSL: 662 ft (202 m)
- Coordinates: 23°57′51″N 32°49′11″E
- Website: https://aswan-airport.com

Map
- Location of airport in Egypt

Runways
Direction	Length		Surface
Direction	m	ft	Surface
17/35	3,402	11,161	Asphalt
- Source: DAFIF

Aswan International Airport (IATA: ASW, ICAO: HESN), is a domestic airport (despite its name) located 16 km southwest of Aswan, Egypt. It was built in 1956 and upgraded in 1992 and 1999 by the Egyptian government.

== Airlines and destinations ==
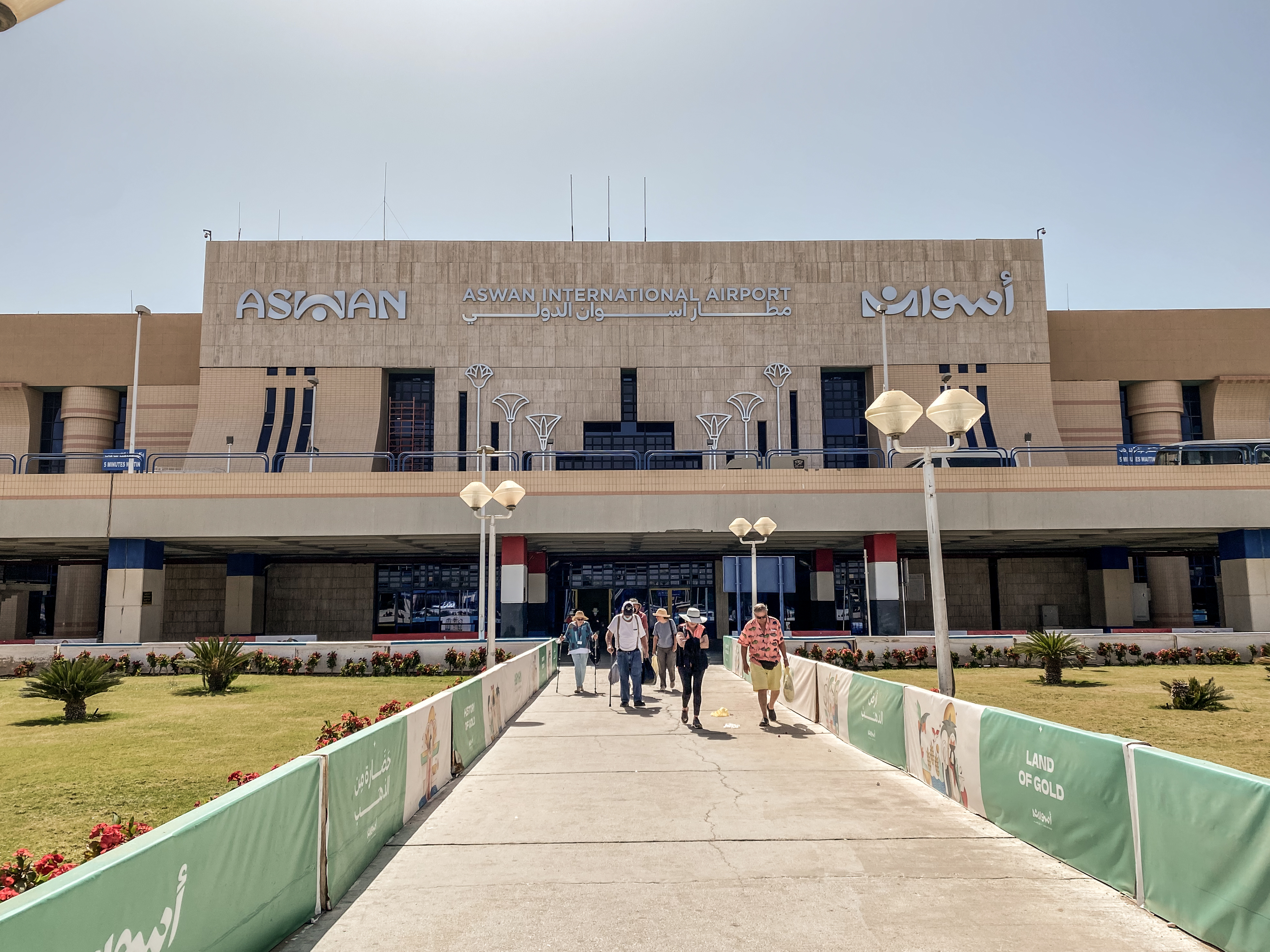
Aswan International Airport in 2022

The following airlines operate regular scheduled passenger flights at Aswan Airport:

Airlines	Destinations
Air Cairo	Abu Simbel, Cairo
Egyptair	Abu Simbel, Cairo
Jazeera Airways	Kuwait City
Nile Air	Cairo
Petroleum Air Services	Seasonal charter: Cairo

== Accidents and incidents ==
- On 17 October 1963 an Ilyushin Il-14 military transport belonging to the Egyptian Air Force crashed at the airport, killing 14 people.
- On 20 March 1969 a United Arab Airlines Il-18 crashed while attempting to land at Aswan International Airport. 100 of the 105 passengers and crew on board died.

== See also ==
- Transport in Egypt
- List of airports in Egypt
