= Aboccis =

Ancient town in Egypt

Coordinates: 22°21′N 31°37′E

i b S k niwt
jbšk
in hieroglyphs

Aboccis or Abuncis (Ancient Greek: Ἀβουγκίς, romanized: Abounkis) was a town in Aethiopia, between the Second Cataract and Syene (modern Aswan), situated on the left bank of the Nile mentioned by Ptolemy, and Pliny the Elder. It was renowned on account of the two magnificent grotto temples, which were discovered at this place by Giovanni Battista Belzoni. The walls of the larger of the two temples were covered with paintings, which recorded the victories of Ramses III over various nations of Africa and Asia. William Smith identifies the place with Abu Simbel.
