= Aeroflot Flight 630 =

1973 aviation accident in the Soviet Union

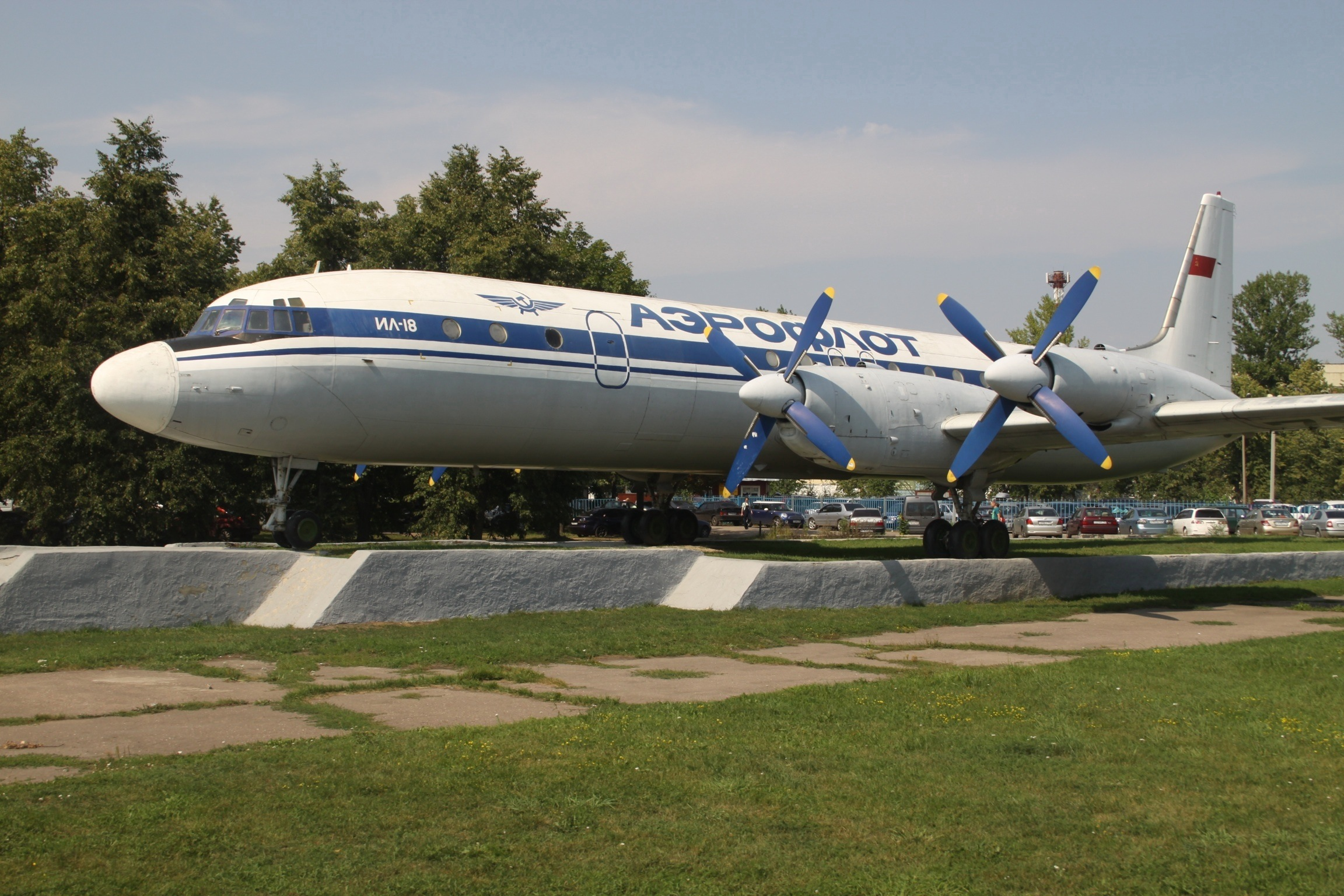
- An Aeroflot Ilyushin Il-18V, similar to the accident aircraft

Accident
- Date: 24 February 1973
- Summary: Undetermined
- Site: 38 km northwest of Leninabad Airport; 40°27′12″N 69°22′50″E

Aircraft
- Aircraft type: Ilyushin Il-18V
- Operator: Aeroflot
- Registration: CCCP-75712
- Flight origin: Dushanbe Airport, Dushanbe
- Stopover: Leninabad Airport, Leninabad (Khujand)
- Destination: Domodedovo Airport, Moscow
- Occupants: 79
- Passengers: 72
- Crew: 7
- Fatalities: 79
- Survivors: 0

Aeroflot Flight 630 (Russian: Рейс 630 Аэрофлота) was a Soviet domestic passenger flight from Dushanbe to Moscow via Leninabad (now Khujand) that crashed on 24 February 1973, killing all 79 people on board, including five children.

== Aircraft ==
The aircraft involved in the accident was an Ilyushin Il-18V turboprop airliner with registration CCCP-75712. The aircraft was equipped with Ivchenko AI-20K engines and made its maiden flight in 1959. At the time of the accident, the aircraft sustained 20,404 flight hours and 9,590 pressurization cycles.

== Crash ==
After climbing to an altitude of 6,600 m (21,700 ft), the aircraft after some time was supposed to turn 60 degrees right to Leninabad, but instead turned only 10 degrees right and then for three minutes followed a constant course at 6,600 m (21,700 ft) with an engaged autopilot. Subsequently, the autopilot was disengaged and the aircraft began turning to the right. After a 60-degree turn, the aircraft started banking to the left, with an angular velocity of 3–4 deg/s. Having reached a 90-degree bank angle, the aircraft fell into a steep left spiral with an increased vertical speed of 100 m/s and increasing normal g forces. At an altitude of about 2,200 m (7,200 ft), the aircraft disintegrated due to high dynamic loads. The debris impacted an area 1,200 by 550 m (3,940 by 1,800 ft) and caught fire.

== Investigation ==
Having found no mechanical or structural failures in the aircraft, the investigation did not reach any conclusions, although it noted that the ATC did not track the flight at the last stage. The Ministry of Aviation Industry of the USSR found that the accident was caused by a navigation error and the crew trying an intense left banking and descend, which led to the loss of control.
