= In-flight fire =

Aviation accident involving fire

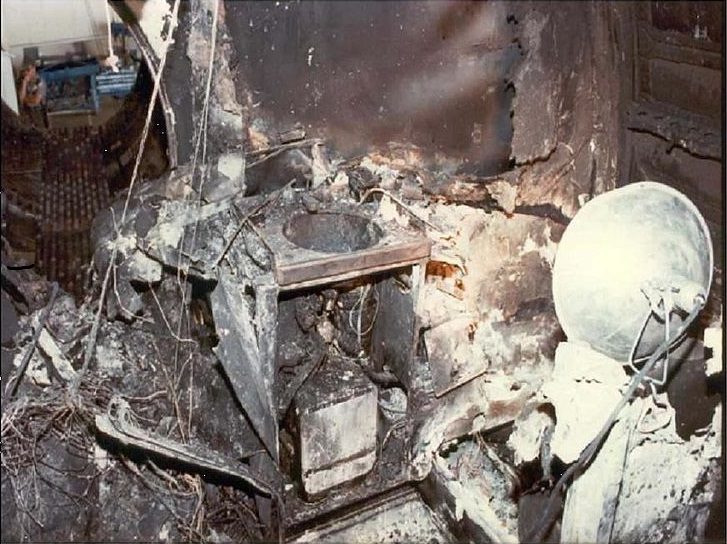
The aftermath of the fire onboard Air Canada Flight 797

In aviation, an in-flight fire is a type of aviation accident where an aircraft catches on fire in-flight. They are considered one of the most dangerous hazards in aviation, with a report from the British Civil Aviation Authority showing that after a fire on an aircraft starts, flight crews only have on average 17 minutes to land their aircraft before it becomes uncontrollable. Between 1981 and 1990, approximately 20% of all fatalities on US airlines were caused by in-flight fires.

== Types ==
- Cabin fire – A fire in the passenger cabin.
  - Includes related areas like lavatories, galleys, overhead compartments, and items on passengers.
- Cargo fire – A fire inside the cargo hold.
- Cockpit fire – A fire in the cockpit.
- Electrical fire – A fire occurring from electrical wires or other electrical systems.
- Engine fire – A fire inside of an aircraft engine.

== Causes and spread ==
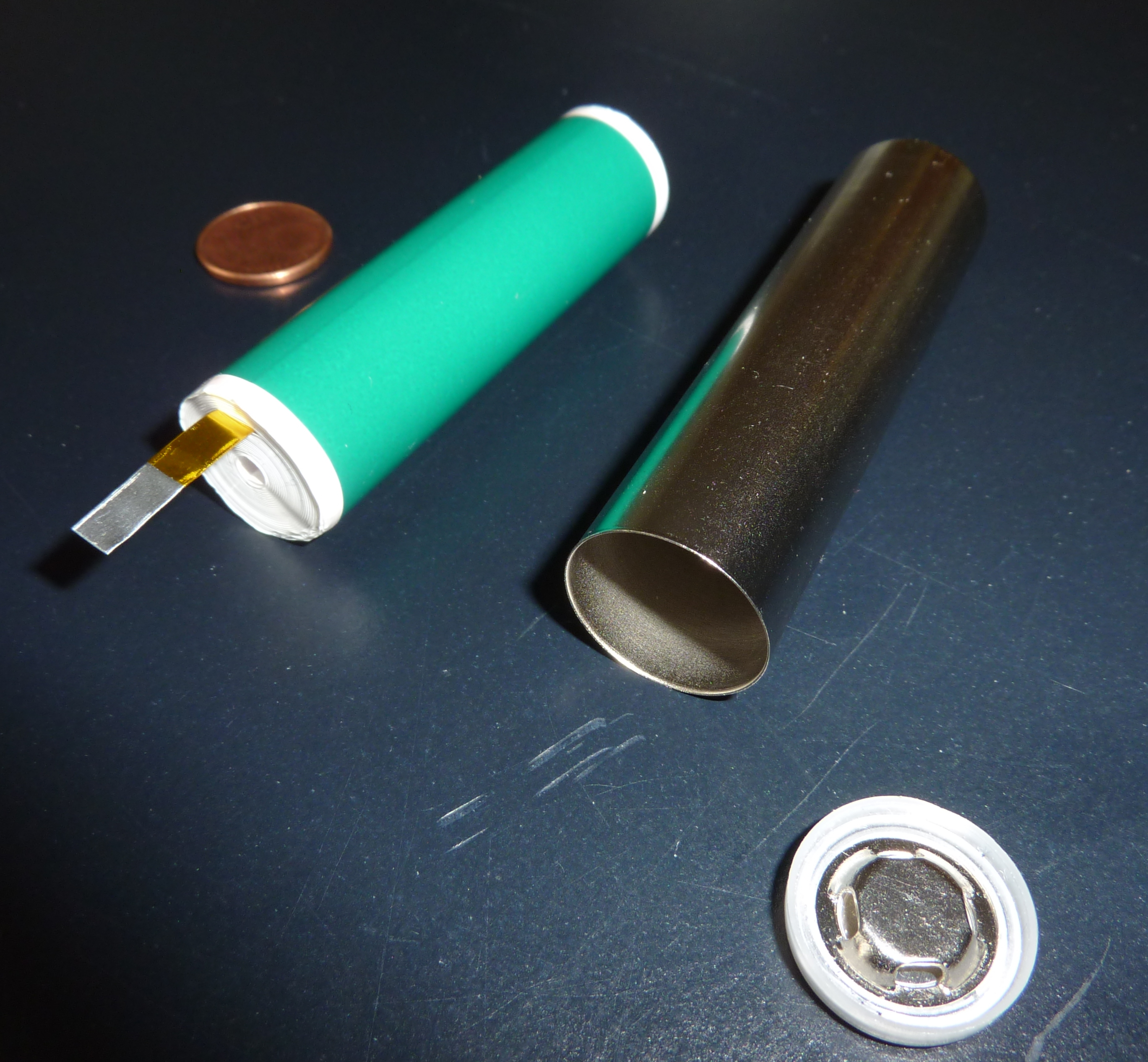
A lithium-ion battery

Electrical fires are often the result of rogue sparks or the overheating of electronic components. If there are flammable materials around the source of the fire, an electrical fire can quickly spread. Cockpit fires are often related to electrical fires as there many electrical components inside the cockpit that can produce sparks. If a cockpit fire is not extinguished in time, the smoke and fire on the controls could make controlling the aircraft harder.

Fires in the cabin can be caused by items that the passengers bring on board, like personal electronic devices, lithium batteries, cigarettes, and can be exacerbated by improper waste management. Electrical fires can also occur in the cabin area from wires that run through the cabin, like those for in-flight entertainment systems.

Depending on the contents of the cargo hold of an aircraft, a cargo fire can quickly spread. For example, lithium batteries can undergo a process called thermal runaway, where the battery is able to serve as a source of heat, fuel, and an oxidizing agent. In 2026, the UK Civil Aviation Authority described lithium-battery fire risk as the number one safety risk to aircraft, after reported UK incidents involving lithium-battery devices detected in hold luggage nearly doubled between 2024 and 2025. Other hazardous cargo include items that can serve as an oxidizing agent, like oxygen bottles and cleaning products.

Engine failures, mainly from loss of engine oil and uncontained engine failures, are the main cause of engine fires. In these scenarios, the excess heat produced could ignite the jet fuel or jet fuel vapors inside the engine.

In cases where a fire burns for a sufficient time, an event called a flashover can occur. A flashover is the near simultaneous ignition of any combustible material within an enclosed area. As more flammable gasses are released when materials burn and the temperature rises, the autoignition temperature is eventually reached, causing everything in the enclosed space to ignite. Temperatures of flashovers can reach 480–650 °C (900–1,200 °F), making them unsurvivable for more than a few seconds.

=== Prevention ===
Since 1985, the Federal Aviation Administration (FAA) has mandated more fire-resistant materials to be used in aircraft to lengthen the amount of time until a flashover occurs. A kerosene burner test for aircraft seats is used to validate their resistance to the type of fuel fire most commonly encountered; developments in fire-resistant foam and fire-blocking layers have adding 40 to 60 seconds of time for passengers to escape the aircraft. Since 1986, aircraft cargo compartments have been required to have more fire-resistant lining and in 1998, the compartments were to have fire detection and suppression systems. Halon fire extinguishers, generally using Halon 1301, are used widely throughout the aviation industry because of their high performance to weight ratio. Due to its ozone depleting nature, aviation fire-suppression systems are one of the last remain permitted uses of halon.

== Notable examples ==
Event	Date	Aircraft	Site	Fatalities/Occupants	Type (Note: This represents where the fire first started, even if it ended up elsewhere in the aircraft)	Cause	Ref
Northwest Airlines Flight 1	13 January 1939	Lockheed 14H Super Electra	Miles City, Montana, United States	4/4	Cockpit fire	Undetermined, possible fuel leak	
TWA Flight 513	11 July 1946	Lockheed L-049 Constellation	Bern Township, Pennsylvania, United States	5/6	Cargo hold fire	Wire arcing	
United Air Lines Flight 608	24 October 1947	Douglas DC-6	Bryce Canyon National Park, Utah, United States	52/52	Cargo fire	Fuel entering cabin heater air intake scoop during transfer of fuel	
1951 Miami Airlines C-46 crash	16 December 1951	Curtiss C-46F-1-CU Commando	Elizabeth, New Jersey, United States	56/56	Engine fire	The No. 10 cylinder in the right engine failed	
American Airlines Flight 476	4 August 1955	Convair CV-240-0	Fort Leaonard Wood, Missouri, United States	30/30	Engine/wing fire	The No. 12 cylinder in the right engine failed	
Swissair Flight 306	4 September 1963	Sud Aviation SE-210 Caravelle III	Dürrenäsch, Aargau, Switzerland	80/80	Landing-gear fire	Overheated tires from excessive braking	
United Air Lines Flight 823	9 July 1964	Vickers Viscount 745D	Cocke County, near Parrottsville, Tennessee, United States	39/39	Cabin fire	Cabin fire of undetermined origin	
Mohawk Airlines Flight 40	23 June 1967	BAC 1-11 204AF	Blossburg, Pennsylvania, United States	34/34	Tail section fire	Complete valve failure in APU spreading fire to the tail section	
BOAC Flight 712	8 April 1968	Boeing 707-465	Hounslow, United Kingdom	5/127	Engine/wing fire	Engine failure due to metal fatigue, failure to close fuel shut off valve	
Interflug Flight 450	14 August 1972	Ilyushin Il-62	Königs Wusterhausen, Bezirk Potsdam, East Germany	156/156	Cargo fire	Hot-air tube leak	
Varig Flight 820	11 July 1973	Boeing 707-320C	Near Orly Airport, Île-de-France, France	123/134	Cabin fire	Undetermined, potential electrical fault or lit cigarette	
Pakistan International Airlines Flight 740	26 November 1979	Boeing 707-340C	Near Taif, Mecca Province, Saudi Arabia	156/156	Cabin fire	Undetermined, potential electrical fault or gasoline leak	
Saudia Flight 163	19 August 1980	Lockheed L-1011-200 TriStar	Riyadh International Airport, Riyadh, Saudi Arabia	301/301	Cargo Fire	Undetermined	
Pilgrim Airlines Flight 458	21 February 1982	de Havilland Canada DHC-6 Twin Otter	Scituate Reservoir, Rhode Island, United States	1/12	Cockpit fire	Ignition of the windshield washer/deicer fluid, exact ignition source undetermined	
Air Canada Flight 797	2 June 1983	McDonnell Douglas DC-9-32	Cincinnati/Northern Kentucky International Airport, Kentucky, United States	23/46	Cabin fire	Undetermined, potential electrical fault	
Mexicana de Aviación Flight 940	31 March 1986	Boeing 727-264	Near Maravatío, Michoacán, Mexico	167/167	Landing-gear fire	Under-inflated and overheated tires being filled with air, chemical reaction	
LOT Polish Airlines Flight 5055	9 May 1987	Ilyushin Il-62	Kabaty Woods, Masovian Voivodeship, Poland	183/183	Engine fire	Disintegration of engine bearings from improper maintenance	
South African Airways Flight 295	28 November 1987	Boeing 747-244BM Combi	Indian Ocean, 225 km NE of Flacq, Mauritius	159/159	Cargo fire	Disputed; undetermined (Official investigation), military fuel (alternate theories)	
American Airlines Flight 132	3 February 1988	McDonnell Douglas MD-83	Nashville International Airport,Tennessee, United States	0/126	Cargo fire	Hazardous materials in cargo hold weren't properly stored	
Horizon Air Flight 2658	15 April 1988	de Havilland Canada DHC-8-102	Seattle–Tacoma International Airport, Washington, United States	0/40	Engine fire	Improperly installed fuel filter	
British Midland Airways Flight 092	8 January 1989	Boeing 737-4Y0	East Midlands Airport, Kegworth, England	47/126	Engine fire	The left engine experienced an excessive vibration of its LP Stage 1 compressor causing a fire which led to smoke entering the cockpit, the pilots in response mistakenly shut off the right engine which eventually caused the left engine to fail.	
Nigeria Airways Flight 2120	11 July 1991	Douglas DC-8-61	Near King Abdulaziz International Airport, Jeddah, Saudi Arabia	261/261	Landing-gear fire	Under-inflated and overheated tires bursting on takeoff	
Zambia national football team plane crash	27 April 1993	de Havilland Canada DHC-5D Buffalo	Gulf of Guinea, near Akanda, Estuaire Province, Gabon	30/30	Engine fire	Engine defects, carbon contamination in gearbox	
Baikal Airlines Flight 130	3 January 1994	Tupolev Tu-154M	Mamony, Irkutsk Oblast, Russia	124/124 (Note: A total of 125 people were killed as one person was killed on the ground)	Engine fire	Uncontained engine failure from foreign object damage	
ValuJet Flight 592	11 May 1996	McDonnell Douglas DC-9-32	Everglades, Florida, United States	110/110	Cargo fire	Improperly packaged oxygen generators activating, excessive heat	
FedEx Express Flight 1406	5 September 1996	McDonnell Douglas DC-10-10CF	Stewart International Airport, New York, United States	0/5	Cargo fire	Undetermined	
Propair Flight 420	18 June 1998	Fairchild Metroliner SA226	Montréal–Mirabel International Airport, Quebec, Canada	11/11	Landing-gear fire	Overheated dragged tires	
Swissair Flight 111	2 September 1998	McDonnell Douglas MD-11	10 km SW of Peggy's Cove, Nova Scotia, Canada	229/229	Electrical fire	Flammable materials around in-flight entertainment wires	
Air France Flight 4590	25 July 2000	Concorde	Gonesse, Île-de-France, France	109/109 (Note: A total of 113 people were killed as four people were killed on the ground)	Fuel tank/Engine fire	Foreign object damage on landing gear	
China Northern Airlines Flight 6136	7 May 2002	McDonnell Douglas MD-82	Bohai Bay, near Dalian Zhoushuizi International Airport, Liaoning, China	112/112	Cabin fire	Intentional gasoline fire, attempted insurance fraud	
UPS Airlines Flight 6	3 September 2010	Boeing 747-400F	Near Nad Al Sheba, Dubai, United Arab Emirates	2/2	Cargo fire	Autoignition of cargo pallet with lithium batteries	
Asiana Airlines Flight 991	28 July 2011	Boeing 747-400F	East China Sea, 160 km (99 mi) W of Jeju City, Jeju Province, South Korea	2/2	Cargo fire	Undetermined	
EgyptAir Flight 804	19 May 2016	Airbus A320-232	Mediterranean Sea, 280 km (170 mi) N of Alexandria	66/66	Cabin/Cockpit fire (Note: The ECAA claimed that the fire started in the forward galley while the BEA claimed that the fire started in the cockpit)	Disputed; bombing (ECAA), leaking oxygen mask (BEA)	
Alaska Air Fuel Douglas C-54 crash	23 April 2024	Douglas C-54D Skymaster	Tanana River, Alaska, United States	2/2	Fuel tank/engine fire	Ignition of leaking fuel after exposure to hot oil, improper maintenance	
Total Linhas Aéreas Flight 5682	9 November 2024	Boeing 737-4Q8 (SF)	São Paulo/Guarulhos International Airport, São Paulo, Brazil	0/2	Cargo fire	Under investigation	
UPS Airlines Flight 2976	4 November 2025	McDonnell Douglas MD-11F	Louisville Muhammad Ali International Airport,Louisville, Kentucky, USA	3/3 (12 ground)	Wing fire due to engine separation	Under investigation	

2026 Russian Air Force Antonov An-12 crash
