= Horizon Air Flight 2658 =

1988 aviation accident in Washington

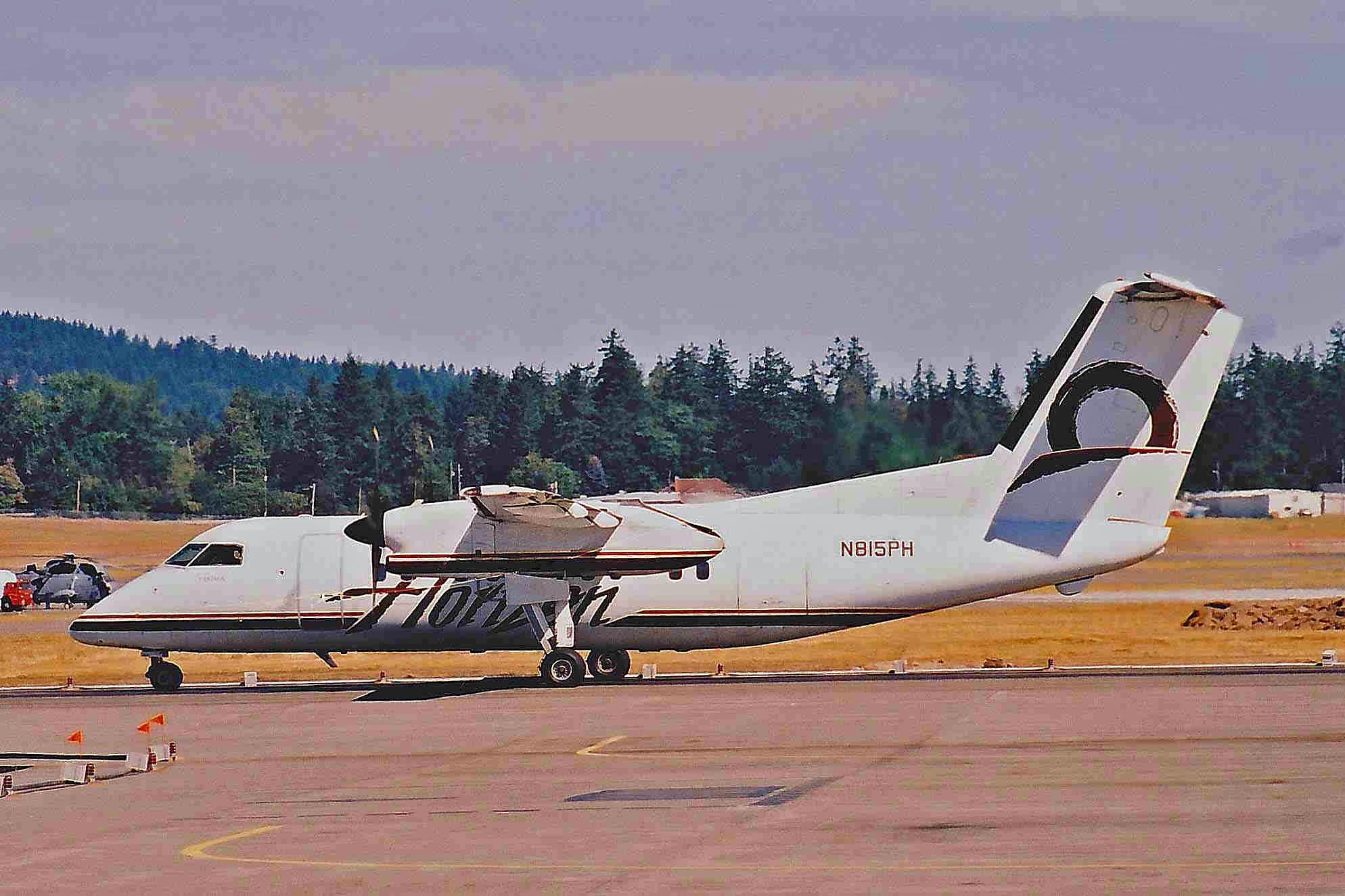
- A Horizon Air DHC-8, similar to the aircraft involved

Accident
- Date: April 15, 1988
- Summary: Engine fire in-flight, runway excursion and collision with jetways during landing
- Site: Seattle–Tacoma International Airport, Washington, United States (Note: The accident site, along with the rest of Seattle–Tacoma International Airport, now falls within the city of SeaTac, but the city was not incorporated until nearly two years after the accident.); 47°26′30″N 122°16′15″W

Aircraft
- Aircraft type: de Havilland Canada DHC-8-102
- Operator: Horizon Air
- IATA flight No.: QX2658
- ICAO flight No.: QXE2658
- Call sign: HORIZON 658 (Note: According to the CVR transcript in the NTSB report, the callsign used during the flight was "Horizon six fifty eight")
- Registration: N819PH
- Flight origin: Seattle–Tacoma International Airport, Washington, United States
- Destination: Spokane International Airport, Washington, United States
- Occupants: 40
- Passengers: 37
- Crew: 3
- Fatalities: 0
- Injuries: 31
- Survivors: 40

On April 15, 1988, Horizon Air Flight 2658, a regional passenger flight from Seattle to Spokane, Washington, crashed into multiple jetways after a runway excursion while landing at Seattle–Tacoma International Airport. The aircraft, a de Havilland Canada Dash 8 with 37 passengers and 3 crew members on board, was climbing out of Seattle–Tacoma International Airport when the right engine failed. As the crew lowered the landing gear, a fire broke out in the right engine nacelle. On landing, the aircraft suffered a loss of braking and directional control. The aircraft veered left off the runway and collided with several baggage carts and jetways before catching fire. Despite the aircraft being destroyed in the impact and fire, all 40 occupants survived the crash.

== Background ==
=== Aircraft ===
The aircraft involved in the accident was a de Havilland Canada DHC-8-102, manufactured by de Havilland Canada in December 1985. It made its first flight in 1986 and was then delivered to Horizon Air in February 1987, registered as N819PH. It had a total of 3,106 airframe hours and had experienced 4,097 takeoffs and landings before the accident.

=== Crew ===
The captain of the flight was 38-year-old Carl Eric Carlson. He was hired by Air Oregon in June 1979; as Air Oregon was being absorbed into Horizon Air, he was hired by Horizon Air in September 1981. In addition to the DHC-8, he was flight qualified on the Fairchild SA-227. By the time of the accident, he had 9,328 total flight hours, 981 of which were in the DHC-8. The first officer of the flight was 35-year-old Mark Raymond Hilstad. He was hired by Horizon Air in March 1987. By the time of the accident, he had 3,849 total flight hours, 642 of which were in the DHC-8.

== Accident ==
On April 15, 1988, the aircraft was flying a scheduled domestic flight from Seattle, Washington to Spokane. At the time of the accident, the flight was fully loaded with 3 crew members and 37 passengers. A pre-flight inspection was conducted by First Officer Hilstad which found no abnormalities. At 18:10, flight 2658 performed pushback and was cleared to taxi to Runway 16L three minutes later. The aircraft was clear for takeoff at 18:25 and Captain Carlson began the takeoff run soon after. The takeoff run was normal and the aircraft took off at 101 kn (187 km/h).

After takeoff, Flight 2658 climbed to around 1,000 ft (300 m) and began a left turn. At this point, one of the passengers noticed a fluid leak from the right engine. After the turn was completed and the aircraft leveled off, the amount of liquid spilled decreased. At about the same time, the crew noticed a loss of power in the right engine. Captain Carlson increased the throttle levers to the maximum position, but the right engine did not respond. The crew decided to turn back to the airport and First Officer Hilstad declared an emergency to air traffic control (ATC). Carlson performed a downwind leg, and at 18:30, approximately 5,300 ft (1,600 m) away from the runway, the crew lowered the landing gear.

While turning onto the final approach course, First Officer Hilstad observed a flash of light in the right engine. He noticed that part of the panel on the right wing had fallen off and was on fire. The same passenger who previously observed the fuel leak also observed the fire and pieces of the engine cowling fall off. After Hilstad informed Captain Carlson that there was a fire, the crew deployed the flaps to 15 degrees and activated the fire suppression system on the right engine. Hilstad still observed a fire from the right-hand side of the aircraft.

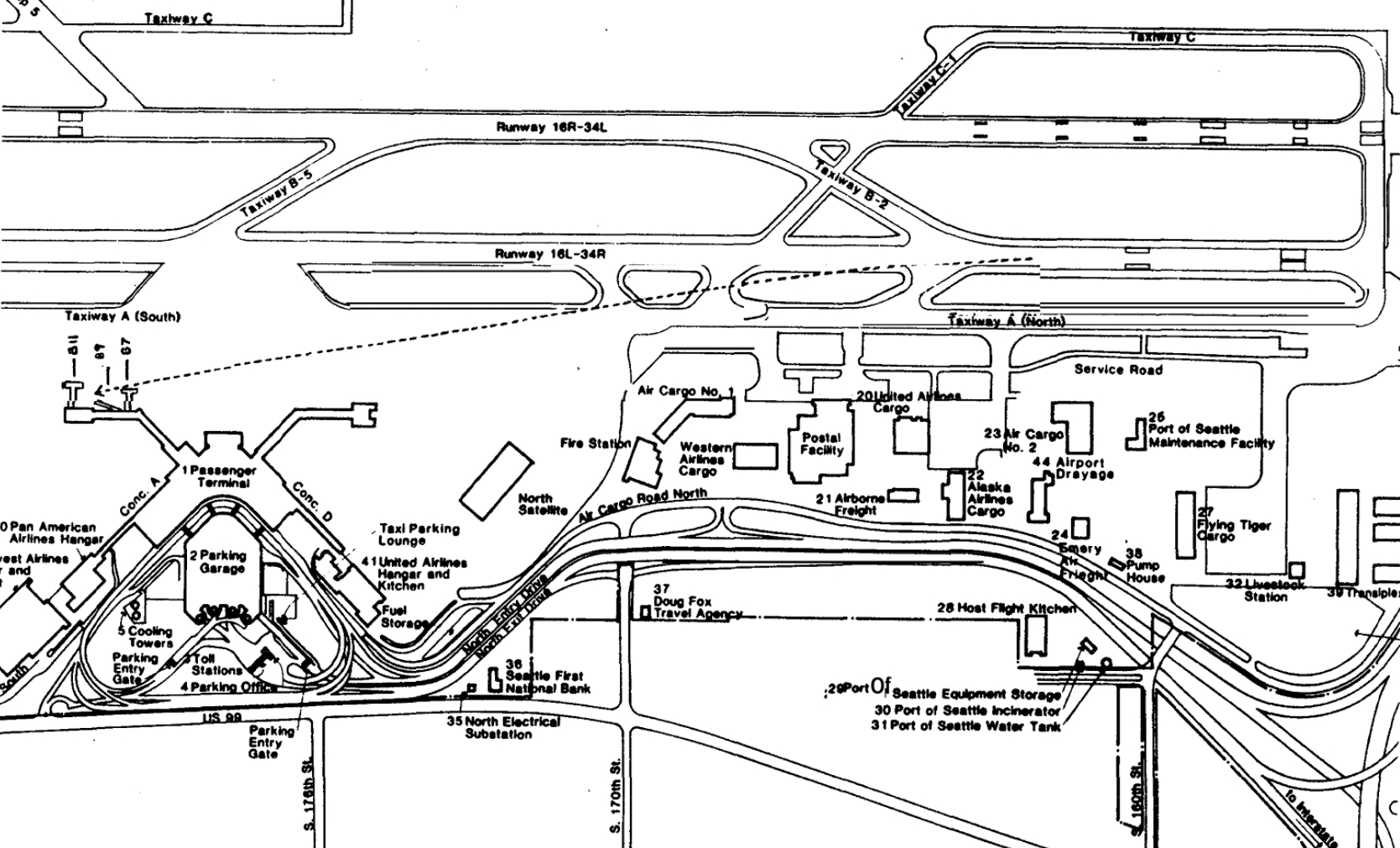
A diagram showing how the aircraft veered off the runway during landing

External videos
- Footage of the crash
- CCTV recording of the crash on YouTube

At 100 ft (30 m) off the ground, the crew noticed that the controls were acting slower than usual. Flight 2658 landed on Runway 16L at 18:31:53 and immediately began to veer to the left of the runway centerline. Captain Carlson attempted to use nose wheel steering, differential braking, and the rudder but discovered he had no directional control over the aircraft. He soon applied the emergency parking brakes in order to try and slow the aircraft down. First Officer Hilstad told ATC that they were out of control before the aircraft passed slightly next to the control tower. The left wing first struck jetway B7, causing significant damage. The left wing then collided with jetway B9, resulting in its separation from the aircraft. The aircraft struck and destroyed several baggage carts and pieces of ground equipment as it traversed the area between jetways B7 and B9 and came to rest against jetway B11 at 18:32:31.

Firefighting and rescue operations were initiated just 15 seconds after the aircraft stopped. No one was killed in the accident, but 27 people sustained minor injuries and 4 were seriously injured. The four seriously injured passengers were all seated on the right side of the aircraft. 18 people were transported to the hospital by ambulance. The flight crew were the last to leave the aircraft as they had to wait for firefighters to open the jammed cockpit door from the outside.

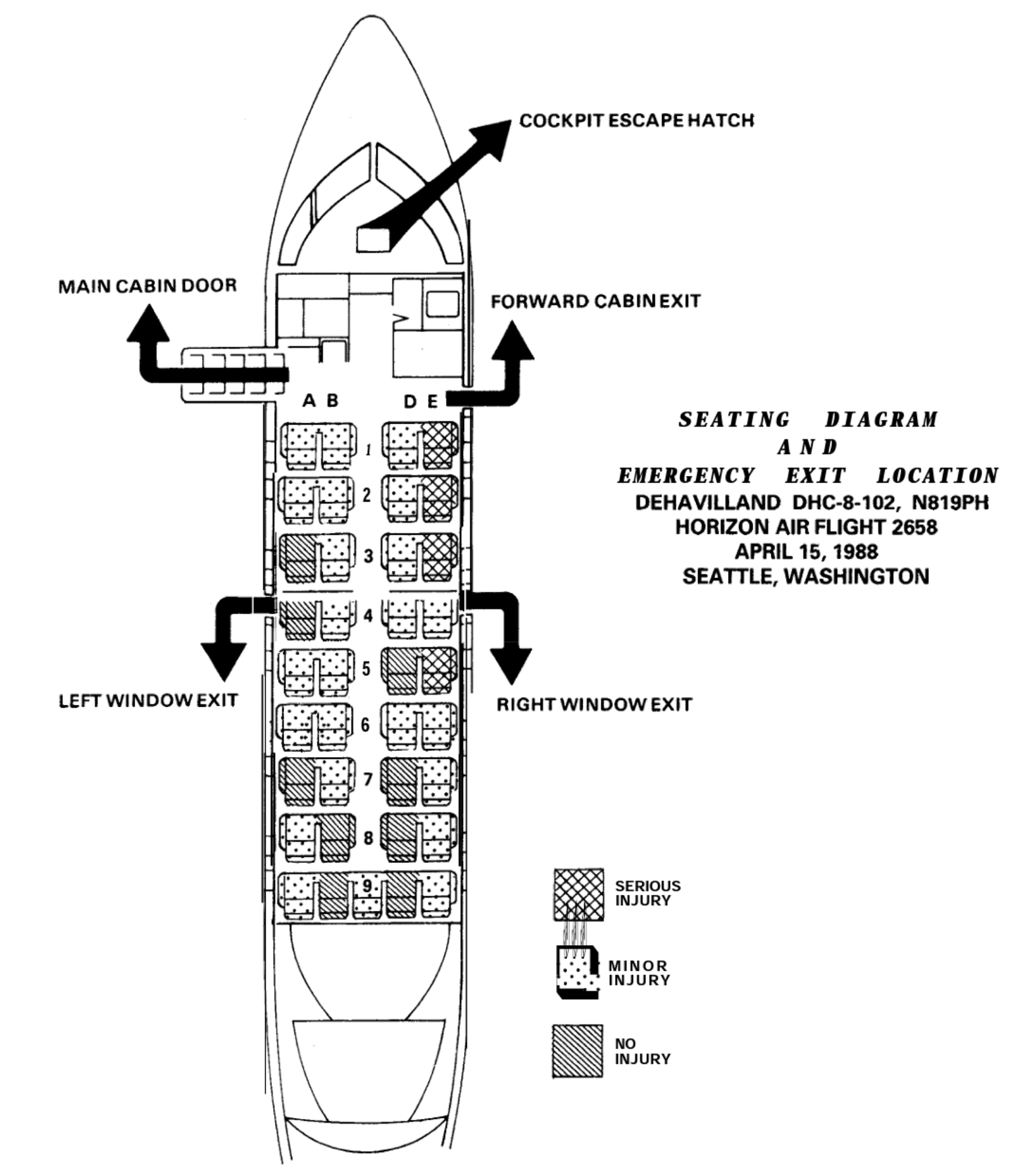
Horizon Air Flight 2658 seat map

The aircraft sustained substantial damage due to the engine fire in-flight and was subsequently destroyed during the impact with obstacles on the ground. The aircraft was deemed beyond repair and became the first total loss of the DHC-8 series. Besides the aircraft, several pieces of equipment were damaged or destroyed, including a runway marking sign, a baggage cart, a pickup truck, a ground auxiliary power unit, and three jetways. The estimated value of the equipment damaged was $280,000.

== Investigation ==
The National Transportation Safety Board (NTSB) conducted the investigation into the accident. The investigation team arrived at the site the following afternoon. The investigation including representatives from Federal Aviation Administration, Horizon Air, and de Havilland Canada.

Both the flight data recorder and cockpit voice recorder were recovered intact from the wreckage. However, some post-landing data was not recorded on the FDR, presumed to be caused by the partial power loss as a result of the fire.

The right wing was severely damaged by the fire. A right engine access panel was recovered 10,300 ft (3,100 m) from the airport in a school yard. No evidence of fire was found on this panel. The NTSB concluded that the access panel had fallen off due to the impact of the fuel explosion.

A CCTV camera at the airport captured the landing, roll out, and crash of Flight 2658. Electronic enhancement was used to analyze the footage. The NTSB found that the ground spoilers had not been activated after landing.

The NTSB investigated the loss of directional control during the landing. Usually, a stand-by hydraulic pump would supply hydraulic pressure to the various control devices, including the ground spoilers, parking brakes, and nose wheel steering, even if the right engine is shut down. However, due to the fire, the spare hydraulic system did not operate. The same failure happened for the hydraulic system relating to the left engine. This rendered the spoiler, emergency brake, parking brake, nose wheel steering, and upper directional rudder inoperable. The NTSB concluded that the fire led to a failure of all hydraulic systems, which led to the crew’s inability to slow down and control the aircraft after it landed.

In March 1989, the NTSB released their final report and determined:

The probable cause of this accident was the improper installation of the high-pressure fuel filter cover that allowed a massive fuel leak and subsequent fire to occur in the right engine nacelle. The improper installation probably occurred at the engine manufacturer; however, the failure of airline maintenance personnel to detect and correct the improper installation contributed to the accident. Also contributing to the accident was the loss of the right engine center access panels from a fuel explosion that negated the fire suppression system and allowed hydraulic line burn-through that in turn caused a total loss of airplane control on the ground.

== See also ==
- List of accidents and incidents involving the de Haviland Canada Dash 8
- Propair Flight 420
