= Baikal Airlines =

Russian airline (1991–2001)

IATA	ICAO	Call sign
X3	BKL	BAIKAL
- Commenced operations: 1991
- Ceased operations: 2001 (merged to Siberia Airlines (currently S7 Airlines)
- Hubs: Irkutsk Airport
- Headquarters: Irkutsk, Irkutsk Oblast, Russia

OJSC "Baikal Airlines" (Russian: ОАО «Авиакомпания «Байкал») was an airline based in Irkutsk, Russia. It was founded in 1991 and liquidated in 2001.

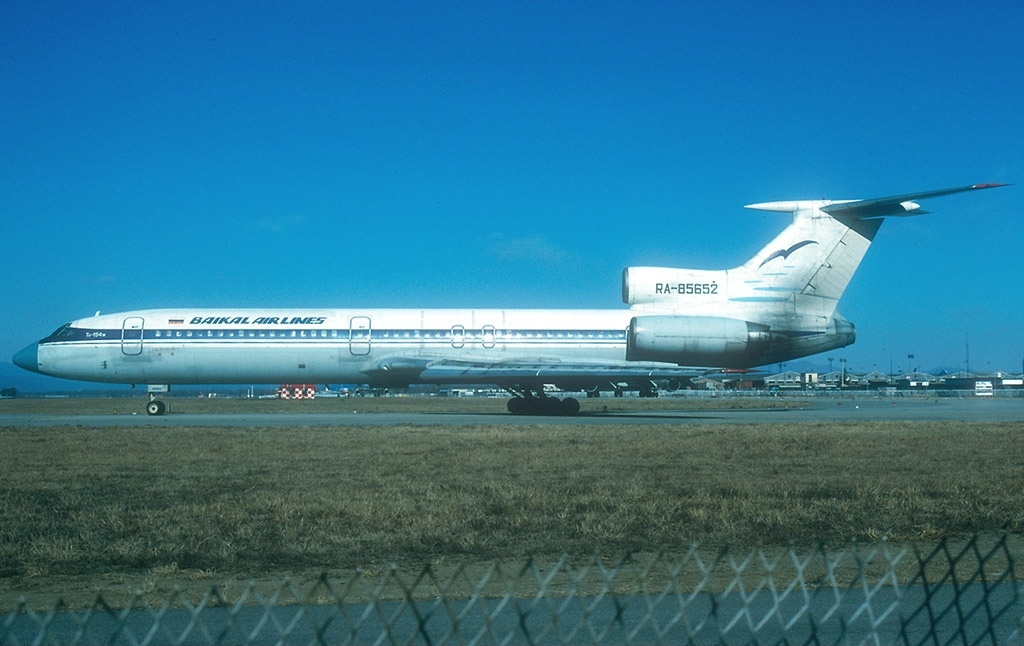
Baikal Airlines Tupolev Tu-154M at Beijing-Capital

== Fleet ==
The Baikal Airlines fleet included Antonov An-24, Antonov An-26 and Tupolev Tu-154 aircraft, as well as a leased Boeing 757 operated from 1994 to 1996.

== Accidents and incidents ==
Baikal Airlines Flight 130- Crashed 3 January 1994, in Mamony, Irkutsk Oblast, Russia, near the city of Irkutsk.
