= Flight 132 =

Flight 132 may refer to:

Listed chronologically

- American Airlines Flight 132, suffered an in-flight fire on 3 February 1988
- Aer Lingus Flight 132, involved in a near-collision on 9 June 2005

== See also ==
- STS-132, a successful Space Shuttle mission in May 2010
