= Candi Kubeck =

American airline pilot (1961–1996)

Candalyn Kubeck
- Born: Candalyn Chamberlin; May 10, 1961; Los Angeles, California, US
- Died: May 11, 1996 (aged 35); Dade County, Florida, US
- Cause of death: Plane crash
- Education: Palomar College; Metro State College
- Occupation: Commercial Airline Pilot
- Known for: Pilot of ValuJet Flight 592
- Spouse: Roger Kubeck (1987–1996)

Candalyn "Candi" Kubeck (née Chamberlin; May 10, 1961 – May 11, 1996) was an American commercial airline pilot and the captain of ValuJet Flight 592. This flight crashed into the Everglades in 1996, after chemical oxygen generators illegally placed inside the cargo hold started and sustained a fire, which in turn disrupted aircraft functionality and flooded the entire cabin and cockpit with smoke. The crash made Kubeck the first female captain to die in a commercial airline crash.

== Early life and education ==
Candalyn Chamberlin was born in Hollywood, Los Angeles, California, on May 10, 1961. She was raised in the San Diego area and often saw many military aircraft fly over her house which inspired her to fly airplanes. Kubeck began flying lessons while in high school after which she attended Palomar College in San Marcos, California where she was a member of the flight team. Kubeck transferred to Metro State College in Denver, Colorado, where she earned her bachelor's degree in Aviation Studies in 1982. While at Metro she flew on the college flight team and was the Team Captain. She was awarded National Top Woman Pilot at the National Intercollegiate Flying Association's National SAFECON meeting in 1981. The award has since been named after her. She also earned a Ninety-Nines Amelia Earhart Memorial Flight Scholarship in 1983 and was given the opportunity to meet Amelia's sister, Muriel.

== Career ==
Candi Kubeck began as an instructor pilot at small airfields and working at various commuter and freight airlines based in California and Arizona. From there, she became an Air Traffic Controller at El Paso International Airport. Kubeck applied for the major airlines, American Airlines, Delta Air Lines, and United Airlines, but as a low-time pilot, she was not initially accepted. In 1989, she was hired by Eastern Airlines as a strikebreaker, crossing the picket line during a strike by the company's unionized pilots. It was a move that she believed was necessary to break in, but it also made her a target of harassment by strikers. The harassment was also directed at her family members and continued after her death. Upon completion of training, Kubeck was assigned as a first officer on Eastern's biggest plane, the Airbus A300, subsequently leaving Eastern after its abrupt shutdown in January 1991. When low-cost startup Valujet Airlines began operations in 1993 she was hired almost immediately. Kubeck became a captain for ValuJet and flew DC-9s.

== Death ==
On May 11, 1996, Kubeck piloted the DC-9 operating ValuJet Flight 592. The aircraft crashed into the Florida Everglades just ten minutes after takeoff, after expired oxygen generators illegally stored in the cargo hold started and sustained a fire. The flight was scheduled to leave at 1:00 pm, but was delayed by mechanical problems. The DC-9 took off from Miami International Airport on runway 9L at 2:04 pm and began a normal climb.

At 2:10 pm, Captain Kubeck and First Officer Richard Hazen heard a loud bang on their headphones. Kubeck said, "What was that?", to which Hazen responded "I don't know." The DC-9 then began losing electrical power. Kubeck said, "We need, we need to go back to Miami." Hazen asked Air Traffic Control for an immediate return to Miami. Air traffic controller Jesse Fisher asked, "What kind of problem are you having?" Kubeck can be heard on the cockpit voice recording shouting "Fire!". Hazen reported smoke in the cabin and cockpit to Fisher. As the plane was turning left to Miami, it banked sharply to the left, which caused it to lose lift and fall from the sky. Kubeck struggled with the aircraft, but failed; the fire had destroyed crucial control cables, making the plane uncontrollable. The DC-9 nosedived into the Everglades, shattering upon impact and killing everyone on board. The subsequent investigation concluded that Kubeck lost control of the plane 10 seconds before impact, and there was no chance that she would have been able to get it on the ground safely. As with many victims, Kubeck's remains were never identified. She was 35 years old.

== Legacy ==
In honor of Kubeck, the National Intercollegiate Flying Association Foundation (NIFA), in conjunction with the Chamberlin and Kubeck families, created the Candi Chamberlin Kubeck Award. The $1,000 scholarship is presented at the Annual International Women in Aviation Conference (WAI) to the nationally ranked Top Female Collegiate Pilot.

== Personal life ==
Kubeck married Roger Kubeck on the Queen Mary in Long Beach, California in September 1987.

== In popular culture ==
The crash of ValuJet Flight 592 and its subsequent investigation is dramatized in season 1, episode 7 of the Canadian television series Mayday titled "Missing Pieces" and season 12, episode 2 titled "Fire in the Hold". Kubeck is portrayed by actress Janet Porter.
