= ValuJet Flight 592 =

1996 aviation accident in Florida

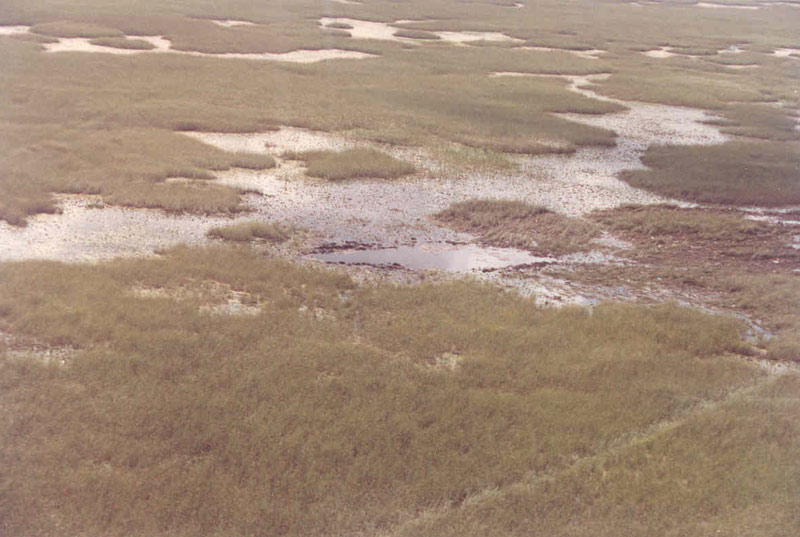
- Aerial view of the crash site

Accident
- Date: May 11, 1996
- Summary: In-flight cargo fire leading to loss of control
- Site: Florida Everglades, Dade County, Florida, US; 25.913°N 80.578°W

Aircraft
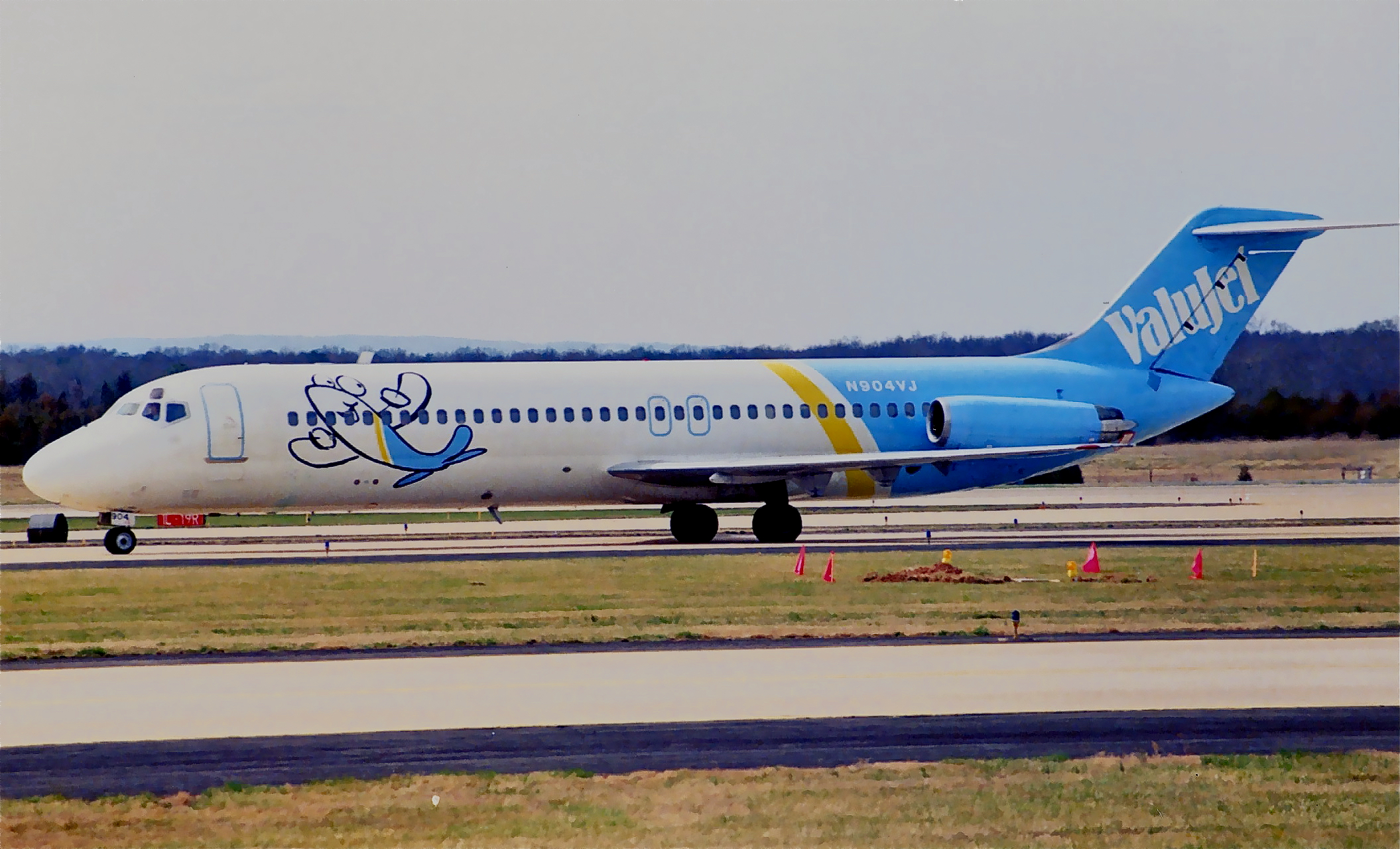
- N904VJ, the aircraft involved in the accident, seen in 1995
- Aircraft type: McDonnell Douglas DC-9-32
- Operator: ValuJet Airlines
- IATA flight No.: J7592
- ICAO flight No.: VJA592
- Call sign: CRITTER 592
- Registration: N904VJ
- Flight origin: Miami International Airport, Miami, Florida, US
- Destination: William B. Hartsfield Atlanta International Airport, Atlanta, Georgia, US
- Occupants: 110
- Passengers: 105
- Crew: 5
- Fatalities: 110
- Survivors: 0

ValuJet Flight 592 was a regularly scheduled flight from Miami to Atlanta in the United States. On May 11, 1996, the McDonnell Douglas DC-9 operating the route crashed into the Florida Everglades about 10 minutes after departing Miami due to a fire in the cargo compartment. The fire was caused by mislabeled and improperly stored chemical oxygen generators. All 110 people on board were killed.

ValuJet, a low-cost carrier, already had a poor safety record before the crash, and the incident brought widespread attention to the airline's problems. Its fleet was grounded for several months after the crash. When operations resumed, the airline was unable to attract as many customers as it had before the deadly crash. The airline acquired AirTran Airways in 1997 but the lingering damage to the ValuJet brand led its executives to assume the AirTran name. It is the deadliest aviation accident in Florida history as of 2026.

== Background ==
ValuJet Airlines was founded in 1992 and was known for its aggressive cost-cutting measures. Many of the airline's planes were purchased in used condition from other airlines, and little training was provided to workers and contractors who were hired for maintenance and other services. ValuJet quickly developed a reputation for a lackluster safety record. In 1995, the United States military refused the airline's bid to fly its personnel due to safety concerns, and some officials at the Federal Aviation Administration (FAA) wanted the airline grounded.

In 1986, a McDonnell Douglas DC-10 from American Trans Air being serviced at Chicago's O'Hare International Airport was destroyed on the ground by a fire caused by chemical oxygen generators. On February 3, 1988, aboard American Airlines Flight 132, a fire began in the cargo hold of the McDonnell Douglas MD-83 while the plane was in flight, caused by hazardous materials (primarily hydrogen peroxide); in that case the crew landed the aircraft safely. After Flight 132, the National Transportation Safety Board (NTSB) recommended to the FAA that all class D cargo holds be fitted with smoke detectors and fire-suppression systems. The FAA declined to implement the recommendation.

== Aircraft and crew ==
The aircraft, a DC-9-32 registered N904VJ, was the 496th DC-9 assembled at the Long Beach plant. It was 27 years old and had been previously flown by Delta Air Lines. Its first flight occurred on April 18, 1969, and it was delivered to Delta on May 27, 1969, as N1281L. The airframe flew for Delta until the end of 1992, when it was retired and sold back to McDonnell Douglas. McDonnell Douglas then sold the plane to ValuJet in 1993. The aircraft was powered by two Pratt & Whitney JT8D-9A turbofan engines.

The aircraft had suffered a series of incidents in the two years before the crash, including two aborted takeoffs and eight emergency landings. Engine and pressurization errors were the primary issues in several of the incidents. In May 1995, the FAA issued a rewiring directive for all DC-9 cockpits because the wire bundles in the switch panel could cause "fire and uncontrolled smoke throughout the cockpit as a result of chafing and shorting."

In the flight deck were two experienced pilots, Captain Candi Kubeck (35) and First Officer Richard Hazen (52). Kubeck had accumulated 8,928 total flight hours throughout her career (including 2,116 hours on the DC-9) and Hazen had more than 11,800 total flight hours throughout his career, with 2,148 on the DC-9.

== Accident ==
On the afternoon of May 11, 1996, Flight 592 left Gate G2 in Miami after a delay of one hour and four minutes because of electrical problems. There were 110 people on board: 105 passengers, mainly from Florida and Georgia, and a crew of two pilots and three flight attendants. At 2:04 p.m. EDT, the DC-9 departed from Runway 9L (now Runway 8R) and began a normal climb.

At 2:10 p.m., the passengers began to smell smoke. At the same time, the pilots heard a loud bang in their headsets and noticed that the plane was losing electrical power. The sag in electrical power and the banging sound were eventually determined to be the result of an explosion of a tire in the cargo hold. Seconds later, a flight attendant entered the cockpit and informed the flight crew of a fire in the passenger cabin. Passengers' shouts of "fire, fire, fire" were recorded on the cockpit voice recorder (CVR) when the cockpit door was opened. ValuJet's flight-attendant training manual stated that the cockpit door should normally not be opened when smoke or other harmful gases might be present in the cabin. However, by this time the intercom was no longer functional and there was no other way to alert the pilots. The flight data recorder (FDR) indicated a progressive failure of the DC-9's electrical and flight control systems resulting from the spreading fire.

Kubeck and Hazen immediately asked air traffic control to return to Miami and were given instructions for a return to the airport. One minute later, Hazen requested the nearest available airport. Kubeck began to turn the plane left in preparation for the return to Miami.

Flight 592 disappeared from radar when it crashed at 2:13:42 p.m., about ten minutes after takeoff.

Eyewitnesses watched as the plane banked sharply, rolled onto its side and nosedived into the Francis S. Taylor Wildlife Management Area in the Everglades, a few miles west of Miami, at a speed in excess of 507 miles per hour (441 kn; 816 km/h). According to the NTSB's report, two witnesses fishing nearby testified that "they saw a low-flying airplane in a steep right bank. According to these witnesses, as the right bank angle increased, the nose of the airplane dropped and continued downward. The airplane struck the ground in a nearly vertical attitude." They reported seeing no external damage nor any sign of fire or smoke other than the engine exhaust. A group of sightseers in a small private plane also witnessed the crash and provided a nearly identical account, stating that Flight 592 seemed to "disappear" after hitting the swamp and that they could see nothing but scattered small debris, part of an engine and a large pool of jet fuel near the crash site.

Examination of debris suggested that the fire had burned through the floorboards in the cabin, resulting in structural failure and damage to the hydraulic cables underneath the instrument panels. This likely rendered the plane uncontrollable; the flight data recorder showed Kubeck lost control of the plane less than 10 seconds before impact. The NTSB report on the accident stated that "the Safety Board cannot rule out the possibility that the flightcrew was incapacitated by smoke or heat in the cockpit during the last 7 seconds of the flight." Interruptions in the cockpit voice recorder occurred on two occasions, one of which was one minute and 12 seconds in length. The aircraft hit the water at 2:13:42 p.m. EDT, about 10 minutes after takeoff. The impact site was on the eastern edge of Florida Water Conservation Area 3B, between two levees, in an area known as the L-67 Pocket.

All on board were killed in the crash. Recovery of the aircraft and victims was severely complicated by the location of the crash. The nearest road of any kind was more than a quarter of a mile (400 m) away from the crash scene, and the location of the crash itself was a deep-water marsh with a floor of solid limestone. The aircraft was destroyed on impact, with no large pieces of the fuselage remaining. Sawgrass, alligators and risk of bacterial infection from cuts plagued searchers involved in the recovery effort.

== Victims ==
Residencies	Passengers	Crew	Total
United States	99	5	104
United Kingdom	2	-	2
Bahamas	2	-	2
Unspecified	2	-	2
Total	105	5	110

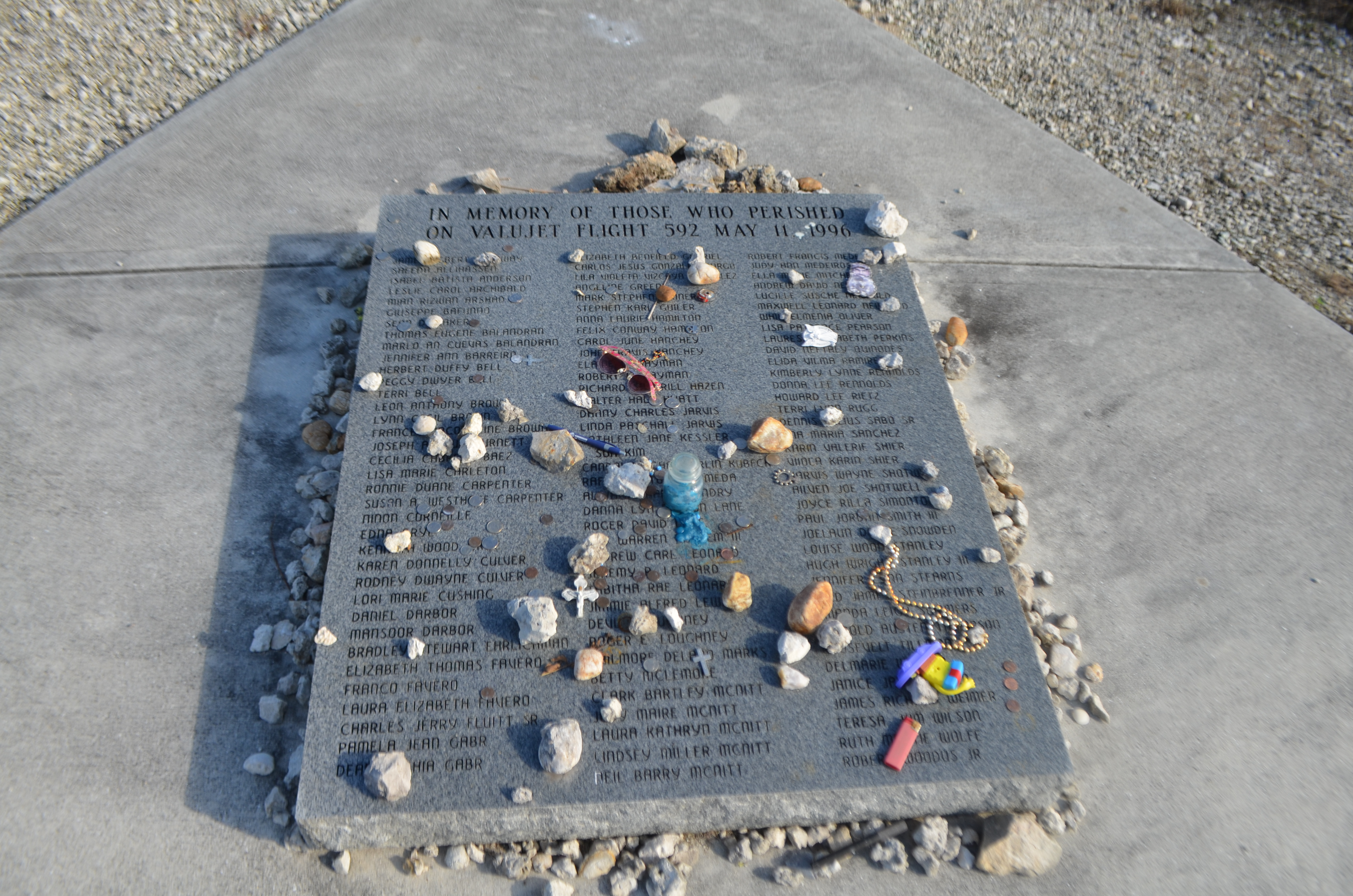
Names of victims at memorial

Notable passengers killed on the flight included:

- San Diego Chargers running back Rodney Culver
- Songwriter and musician Walter Hyatt
- DelMarie Walker, 38, the prime suspect in a murder in Georgia

Recovery of the passengers and crew took several weeks, and very few intact human remains were found given the sheer violence of the impact, immersion in swamp water and scavenging by wildlife. About 68 of the 110 victims were identified, in some cases from examining jawbones, and at least one individual from a single tooth. A piece of torn flesh was proven to belong to Hazen, but Kubeck's remains were never found. Because of the adverse conditions, performing toxicology tests on the human remains to determine their exposure to fumes and smoke from the in-flight fire was not possible.

== Investigation ==
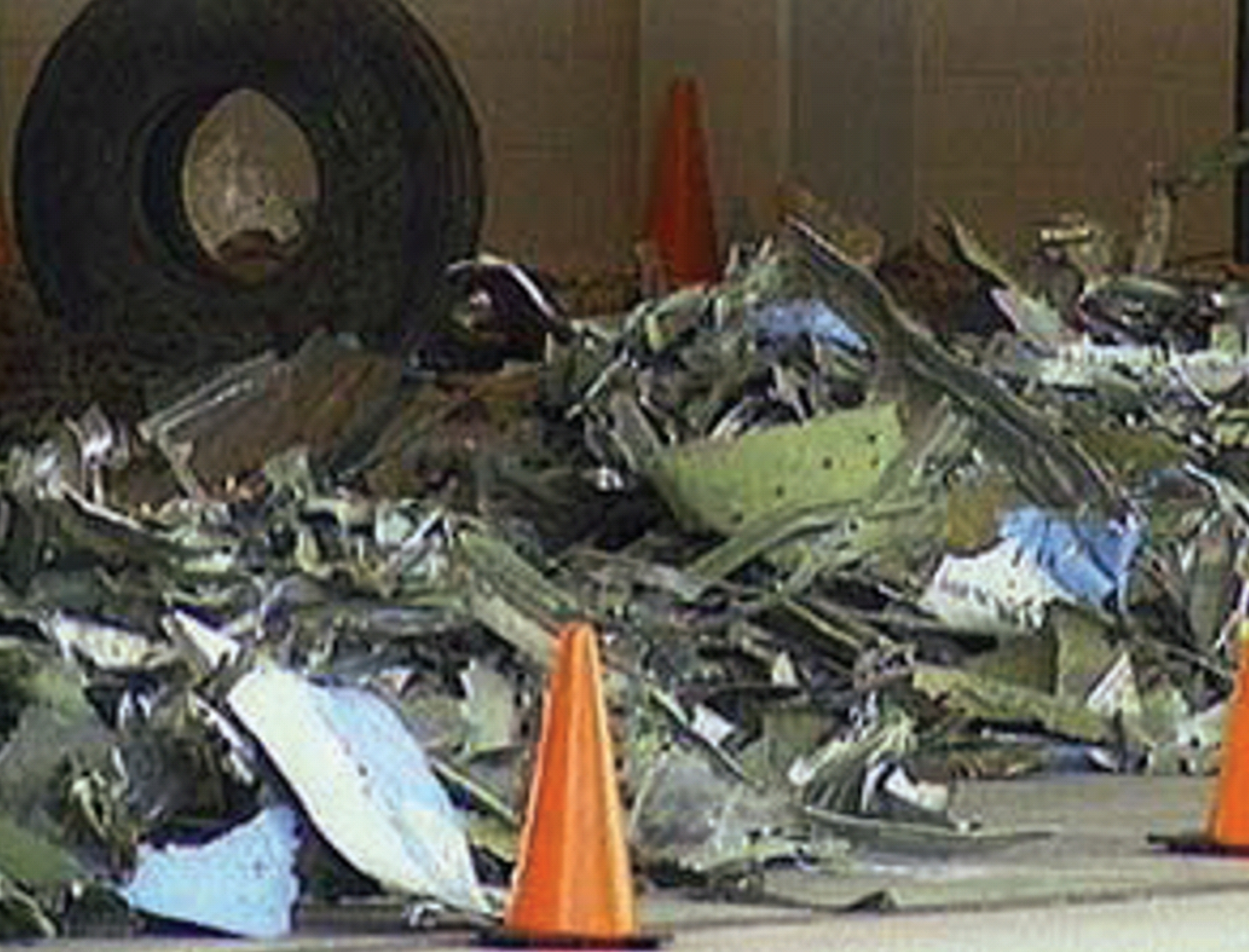
The pieces of the wreckage of Flight 592

At the end of a 15-month investigation, the National Transportation Safety Board (NTSB) determined that the fire had developed in a cargo compartment below the passenger cabin. The cargo compartment was of a Class D design, in which fire suppression is accomplished by sealing the hold from outside air. Any fire in such an airtight compartment would quickly exhaust all available oxidizers and then extinguish itself. As the fire suppression can be accomplished without any intervention by the crew, such holds are not equipped with smoke detectors.

The NTSB determined that just before takeoff, 144 expired chemical oxygen generators, each slightly larger than the size of a tennis-ball can, had been placed in the cargo compartment in five boxes marked COMAT (company material) by ValuJet's maintenance contractor SabreTech. This violated Federal Aviation Administration (FAA) regulations forbidding the transport of hazardous materials in passenger-aircraft cargo holds. (Note: The generators had been removed from three MD-80s recently acquired by ValuJet; pre-MD-80 versions of the DC-9 do not use oxygen generators.) Failure to cover the generators' firing pins with the prescribed plastic caps made accidental activation much more likely. The investigation revealed that rather than covering the pins, maintenance personnel simply cut the cords attached to the pins or applied duct tape around the cans, and consumer-grade adhesive tape was also used to secure the ends. SabreTech employees indicated on the cargo manifest that the "oxy canisters", which were loosely packed in boxes that were each sealed with tape and bubble wrap, were "empty." ValuJet workers then loaded the boxes in the cargo hold in the mistaken belief that the devices were simply empty canisters that would be safe and legal to transport on a passenger aircraft.

Chemical oxygen generators, when activated, produce oxygen for passengers if the plane suffers a decompression. However, they also produce a great quantity of heat because of the exothermic nature of the chemical reaction involved. Therefore, not only could the heat and generated oxygen start a fire, but the oxygen could also keep the fire burning.

Investigators determined that one of the oxygen generators was likely triggered when the plane experienced a slight jolt while taxiing. As the aircraft taxied and took off, the generator began releasing heat that caused other canisters to activate. Each activation created more heat, which rapidly caused all of the generators to activate. The intense heat ignited a fire in the other materials in the cargo hold. The fire was worsened by the presence of two main aircraft tires, one of them mounted on a main wheel, and a nose tire and wheel that were also included in the list of materials shipped as COMAT.

Laboratory testing showed that canisters of the same type could heat nearby materials up to 500 °F (260 °C). The oxygen from the generators fed the resulting fire in the cargo hold without any need for outside air, defeating the cargo hold's airtight design. A pop and jolt heard on the cockpit voice recording and correlated with a brief and dramatic spike in the altimeter reading in the flight data recording were attributed to the sudden cabin-pressure change caused by one of the wheels in the cargo hold exploding from the heat. Investigators also determined that in this process, the fire began to destroy control cables that ran to the back of the aircraft, which explained why the pilots began losing control before the plane crashed. The NTSB concluded that the aircraft was under positive control by the pilots until the time of the sharp right turn and dive immediately prior to impact.

=== Regulatory change ===
Smoke detectors in the cargo holds can alert the flight crew of a fire long before the problem becomes apparent in the cabin, and a fire-suppression system buys valuable time to land the plane safely. This would prevent a scenario similar to Flight 592 in which the emergency had escalated well beyond the flight crew's ability to respond by the time that the problem had become apparent. In February 1998, the FAA issued revised standards requiring all Class D cargo holds to be converted by early 2001 to Class C or E; these types of holds have additional fire-detection and fire-suppression equipment.

=== Culpability ===
The NTSB report placed responsibility for the accident on three parties:

- SabreTech, for improperly packaging and storing hazardous materials
- ValuJet, for not supervising SabreTech
- The FAA, for not mandating smoke-detection and fire-suppression systems in cargo holds as recommended in 1988 after a similar incident with American Airlines Flight 132

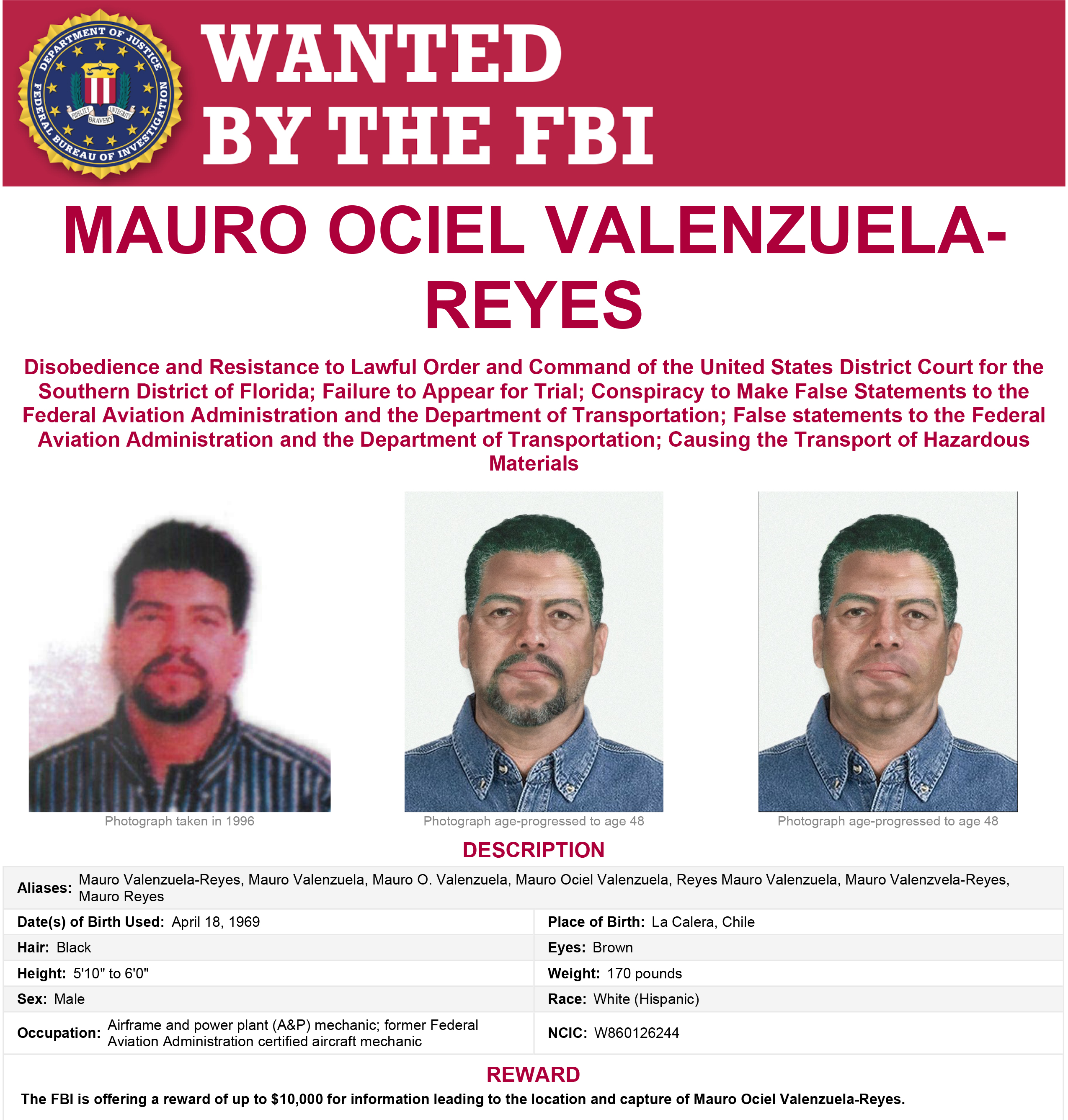
FBI Wanted infographic of Valenzuela-Reyes

In 1997, a federal grand jury indicted SabreTech for mishandling hazardous materials, failing to train its employees in proper handling of hazardous materials, conspiracy and making false statements. SabreTech's maintenance supervisor Daniel Gonzalez and two mechanics who worked on the plane, Eugene Florence and Mauro Ociel Valenzuela-Reyes, were charged with conspiracy and making false statements. Two years later, having been found guilty on the mishandling hazardous materials and improper training charges, SabreTech was fined $2 million and ordered to pay $9 million in restitution. Gonzalez and Florence were acquitted on all charges, while Valenzuela failed to appear and was indicted in absentia for contempt of court. A warrant was issued for Valenzuela's arrest in 2000, and he remains a fugitive as of 2026. In 2010, he was specifically highlighted in the EPA's announcement of a website to search for "environmental fugitives." The FBI has offered a $10,000 reward for information on his whereabouts.

In May 2001, SabreTech agreed to pay $2.25 million in fines to the FAA (later reduced to $1.75 million), but did not admit wrongdoing. In November 2001, the United States 11th Circuit Court of Appeals overturned most of the verdict against SabreTech. It found that at the time, federal law did not support criminal penalties for reckless violations of hazmat regulations. SabreTech had been convicted of violating the Hazardous Materials Transportation Act, which did not provide criminal penalties for reckless violations of the act. However, the 11th Circuit did allow the conviction for improper training to stand, and remanded that count to a lower court for resentencing. In 2002, federal judge James Lawrence King sentenced SabreTech to a $500,000 fine and three years' probation.

Just before the federal trial, a Florida grand jury indicted SabreTech on 110 counts of manslaughter and another 110 counts of third-degree murder: one for each person who died in the crash. SabreTech settled the state charges by agreeing to plead no contest to a state charge of mishandling hazardous materials and make a $500,000 donation to promote aviation safety.

SabreTech was the first American aviation company to be criminally prosecuted and convicted for its role in an American airline crash. The company, a subsidiary of St. Louis-based Sabreliner Corporation, went out of business in 1999.

ValuJet was grounded by the FAA on June 16, 1996. It was allowed to resume flying again on September 30, but never recovered from the crash.

Many families of Flight 592's victims were outraged that ValuJet was not prosecuted, given the airline's poor safety record. ValuJet's accident rate was not only 14 times higher than that of legacy airlines, but one of the highest in the low-fare sector as well. In the aftermath of the crash, an internal FAA memo surfaced questioning whether ValuJet should have been allowed to stay in the air. The victims' families also point to statements made by ValuJet's officials immediately after the crash that led many to believe that ValuJet knew that the generators were on the plane and had ordered them returned to Atlanta rather than properly disposed in Miami.

=== Name change to AirTran ===
In 1997, the company acquired AirTran Airways. Although ValuJet was the nominal survivor, the merged airline took the AirTran name. ValuJet executives believed that a new name was important to regain the trust of the flying public. AirTran made little mention of its past as ValuJet. For example, it did not make any major announcements on the crash's 10th anniversary. In 2011, AirTran was purchased by Southwest Airlines.

== Legacy ==
On the third anniversary of the accident in 1999, a memorial to the victims was dedicated in the Everglades. The memorial, consisting of 110 concrete pillars, is located just north of the Tamiami Trail highway, about 12 miles west of Krome Avenue in Miami-Dade County. It points to the location of the crash site 12 miles to the north-northeast. Students from the American Institute of Architecture Students designed the memorial, and local contractors, masons and labor unions built it for free.

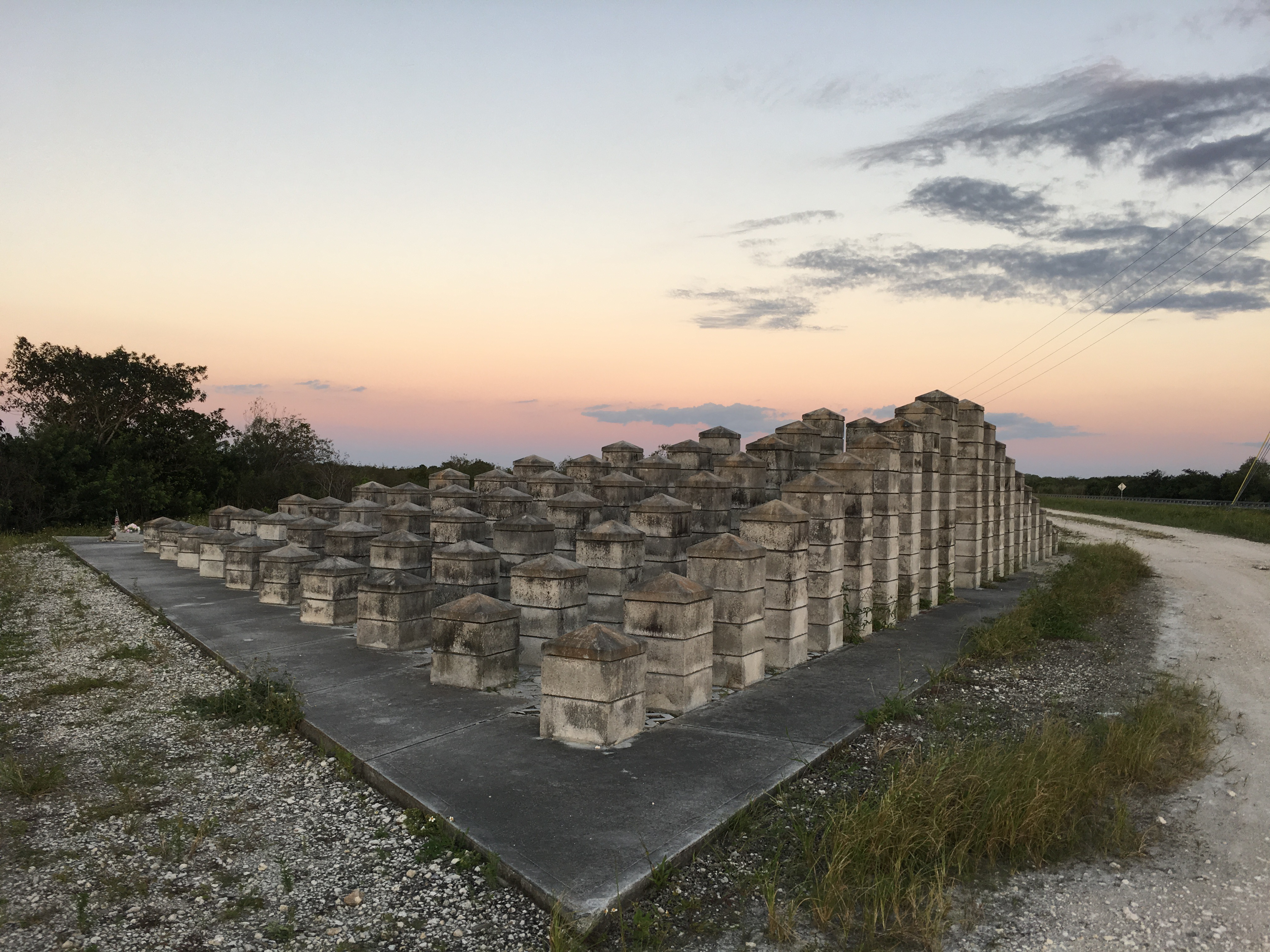
Looking across the memorial eastward

In a June 4, 2013, Miami Herald article, a local resident stated that while slogging through the sawgrass several months earlier, he had found a partially melted gold pendant in the same area. It is believed to have been a possession of a victim of either the ValuJet crash or the 1972 crash of Eastern Air Lines Flight 401, which had occurred about 2 miles (3.2 km) from the ValuJet crash site.

== In popular culture ==
Three different shows have covered the crash of ValuJet 592: Seconds from Disaster ("Florida Swamp Air Crash"), Why Planes Crash ("Fire in the Sky"), and Mayday ("Fire in the Hold"). It was also featured in the last episode of the four-part Travel Channel series Probable Cause: Air Crash Investigations and in an episode of Cops being filmed in the Miami area at the time. The series premiere of CSI: Miami also referenced elements of the crash such as the Everglades search.

== See also ==
- Northwest Orient Airlines Flight 705, a 1963 accident in which a Boeing 720 crashed into the Florida Everglades south-west of where Flight 592 crashed.
