= Pakistan International Airlines Flight 740 =

1979 aviation accident in Saudi Arabia

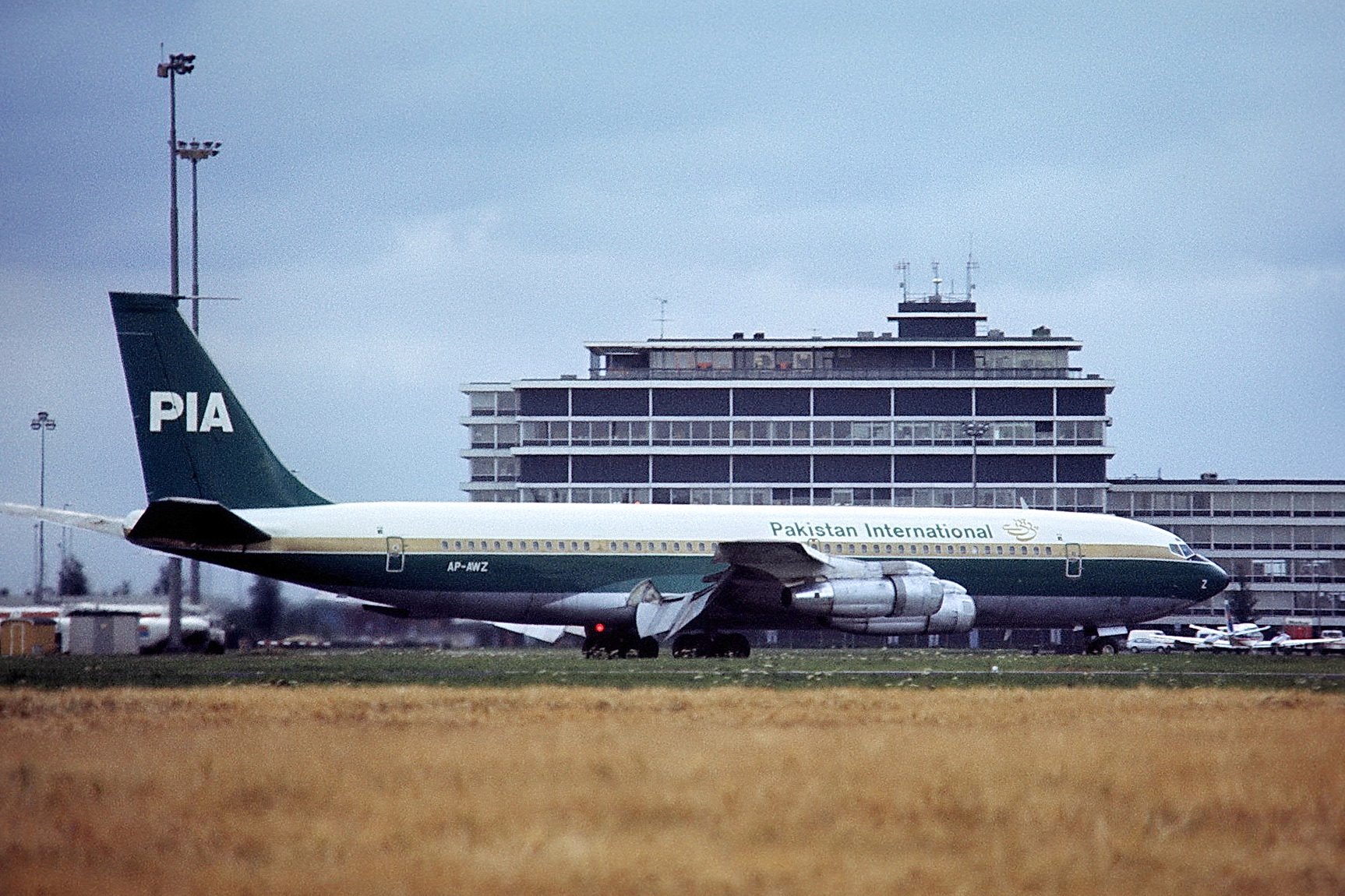
- AP-AWZ, the aircraft involved in the accident, seen in 1978

Accident
- Date: 26 November 1979
- Summary: In-flight fire; cause unknown
- Site: Near Taif, Mecca Province, Saudi Arabia; 21°42′42.3″N 40°24′26.6″E

Aircraft
- Aircraft type: Boeing 707-340C
- Operator: Pakistan International Airlines
- Registration: AP-AWZ
- Flight origin: Kano, Nigeria
- Stopover: Jeddah International Airport, Jeddah, Saudi Arabia
- Destination: Jinnah International Airport, Karachi, Pakistan
- Occupants: 156
- Passengers: 145
- Crew: 11
- Fatalities: 156
- Survivors: 0

On 26 November 1979, Pakistan International Airlines Flight 740, a Boeing 707 operating a scheduled international passenger flight from Kano, Nigeria, to Karachi, Pakistan, via Jeddah, Saudi Arabia, crashed near Taif after attempting to return to Jeddah International Airport following an in-flight fire, killing all 145 passengers and 11 crew members.

Around eighteen minutes after taking off from Jeddah, a flight attendant reported to the flight crew that a fire had started in the aft section of the aircraft. The flight crew were given clearance by air traffic control to return, and were ordered to start descending to 4,000 feet (1,200 m). The crew levelled off at 11,000 feet (3,400 m) to account for minimum safe altitudes; however, due to the rapidly spreading fire in addition to smoke likely incapacitating the crew, control of the aircraft was lost, and it subsequently crashed.

Despite theories that sabotage or an electrical issue had caused the crash, which were discounted due to a lack of evidence, the cause of the fire could not be conclusively determined. The Saudi-led investigation concluded that one or multiple leaking gasoline or kerosene stoves carried by Muslim pilgrim passengers had likely ignited. It was probable that an increasing pressure differential and improperly sealed gaskets led to leaks from the stoves which were then ignited either by a spark or a cigarette.

== Aircraft and crew ==
The aircraft involved, manufactured in 1970, was a Boeing 707-340C registered as AP-AWZ and owned by Pakistan International Airways. Powered by four Pratt & Whitney JT3D-3B engines, it had flown for a total of 30,710 hours by the time of the accident. At the time of the accident, the aircraft was airworthy.

On board the flight were 156 occupants, consisting of 145 passengers and 11 crew members. The flight crew consisted of a captain with a total flight experience of 4,693 hours with 476 on the Boeing 707 and 720, a first officer with 1,379 total flight experience, 242 on the Boeing 707, and a flight engineer. Most of the occupants were Muslim pilgrims returning from Hajj in Mecca to Pakistan, with only two foreigners on board. The crash occurred in parallel to the Grand Mosque seizure, and authorities in Saudi Arabia had arranged charter flights to repatriate Muslims back to their countries.

== Accident ==
On 26 November 1979, Pakistan International Airlines Flight 740 was operating a scheduled passenger flight from Kano, Nigeria, to Jinnah International Airport, Karachi, Pakistan, via Jeddah International Airport, Jeddah, Saudi Arabia. At 01:29 local time, the aircraft took off from Jeddah International Airport en route to Karachi in clear weather and nighttime conditions. At 01:47, while still climbing, a flight attendant went into the cockpit and reported a "large fire" and "a lot of smoke" in the rear section of the aircraft. The flight engineer was sent by the captain with a fire extinguisher to assess the situation; when he reported back to the cockpit, he stated that the fire had started near the door while the flight attendant instead suggested that it had started in parallel in the toilet. He also stated that attempts to extinguish the fire had failed. When asked by the captain to return to extinguish the fire, he stated that it was "not possible to go back" as there was "too much fire", and at the same time, passengers were also crowded in the aisle.

The captain did not initially turn back towards Jeddah, continuing to climb to their cruise altitude of 37,000 feet (11,000 m). Deciding to turn back, at 01:51, the flight crew reported the fire to air traffic control (ATC) and requested clearance to return to Jeddah: "Jeddah Pakistan 740 at 290 position 123 DME. We would like to return back to Jeddah due to smoke in the aircraft - fire - electrical supposedly." The air traffic controller responded with, "Do whatever you like, sir", and the crew started their descent from 30,000 feet (9,100 m). At 01:57, the crew asked ATC, "Jeddah, Pakistan 740, can you tell us what height we can descend to safely?" with ATC replying "Cleared to descend to 4,000 feet." The captain replied, "Roger, 4,000", and asked his first officer to verify the area's minimum safe altitude (MSA), with the first officer replying, "It's about 11,000 feet." The descent clearance issued by the ATC failed to take into account the area's MSA, although the investigation noted that this did not contribute to the accident as the flight crew recognised the error and levelled off at 11,000 feet (3,400 m).

At 02:00, the first officer stated, "We are getting flames inside the back, you want to get down faster." At 02:01, an emergency descent was started; the first officer told ATC, "We're making an emergency descent, request radar assistance for landing", with the ATC granting the request. At 02:03, the crew declared an emergency; this was their final transmission. Twenty seconds after the transmission, the flight could be seen on the controller's radar as being 65 miles (105 km) away from Jeddah at an altitude of 19,000 feet (5,800 m), before losing radar contact. As the fire continued to rapidly grow, despite donning their oxygen masks, the smoke likely incapacitated the pilots. Travelling south-south-east, the aircraft lost control and entered an 8,000-foot (2,400 m) dive.

At 02:04:15, the aircraft crashed into a rocky desert plateau at an elevation of around 3,000 feet (910 m), 90 miles (140 km) east of Jeddah, near Taif, killing all 156 passengers and crew. The crash, witnessed by the crew of a BAC One-Eleven around 30 miles (48 km) away, resulted in an explosion and the disintegration of the aircraft. The wreckage of the aircraft was spread over a 3 miles (4.8 km) radius, 3,800 feet (1,200 m) in length and 1,100 feet (340 m) in width.

Rescue teams were quickly deployed to search for the aircraft in a difficult-to-access area. Three Saudi Air Force aircraft carrying rescue teams were deployed to the crash site. Upon arrival, no survivors could be found. Authorities in Saudi Arabia first addressed the crash after 18 hours. The crash was, at the time, Saudi Arabia's deadliest aviation accident.

== Investigation ==
An investigation was ordered by Saudi Arabia, with two officials of the Pakistan Civil Aviation Authority joining the Saudi-led investigation. Complicating the investigation was the total destruction of the aircraft which was the result of the crash and subsequent fire, which made finding essential information "extremely difficult". The aircraft was travelling at high speeds when it crashed. In addition, it was nearly fully fuelled, and the rough terrain in which it crashed into resulted into the "extreme destruction" of the aircraft". As such, due to the extent of the destruction of the wreckage, the cause of fire could not be determined.

The aircraft's flight data recorder (FDR) was destroyed and was not of much use to the investigation, as investigators only managed to recover a portion of the foil and one spool. The readable portion of the foil was only a recording of the previous flight. The cockpit voice recorder (CVR) was recovered in good condition, and despite severe damage sustained during the crash, its tape was usable. The CVR showed that the fire had originated either near the rear cabin door, the lavatory, or in both areas. The transcript also recorded someone saying "Fire, fire, it is totally on fire", along with background voices also indicating that panicked passengers had moved towards or into the cockpit. The CVR later failed at 02:01:30, fourteen minutes after the fire was first reported.

=== Cause of the fire ===
Happening against the backdrop of the Grand Mosque seizure, it was initially considered that the flight had been the subject of sabotage, but this theory was contested by PIA officials and by the Saudi government, asserting instead that a fire had started in the aircraft's electrical system. The official Saudi investigation considered the theory of sabotage unlikely, as it did not find any evidence of an explosion occurring before the crash, and the idea that the aircraft could have been bombed using an incendiary device was inconsistent with previous terrorist activity in the Middle East. No group claimed credit for causing the crash, nor was there evidence that an incendiary device was used.

The investigative board could also not find any conclusive proof of an electrical failure starting the fire. On one hand, the pilot had first told ATC that there was "supposedly" an electrical fire, and the flight engineer had also told the captain that "[he] saw wires by the cabin door." The CVR recorded reports of a burning smell, suggesting that the fire was electrical in origin. On the other hand, the investigation could not determine whether or not the wires were part of the aircraft, and with the Boeing 707 being equipped with electrical circuit protection devices, it was unlikely that a fire would spread as quickly as it did if it were electrical in origin.

The investigative board found that the fire had most probably been unintentionally started by a passenger. Many of the Muslim pilgrims had been carrying small gasoline or kerosene stoves to cook food or make tea, some of which were found in the wreckage. If one or more of the stoves were fuelled and pressurised, the pressure differential would increase as the aircraft continued to ascend. In addition, if one or more of the gaskets of these stoves were not properly sealed, they could in turn leak fuel into the cabin or cargo hold, which could then be ignited by a spark or cigarette ember. Investigators could not determine whether oxygen masks were deployed in the cabin, although their deployment would have released pure oxygen into the cabin which would have worsened the fire.

=== Human factors ===
It could not be determined why the flight attendant chose to report the fire personally in the cockpit instead of using the intercom which was in service. It was possible that since one or more flight attendants closest to the fire were preoccupied, another flight attendant in the forward section of the aircraft saw the fire or was told of the situation and alerted the crew. It was considered unlikely that a flight attendant already preoccupied by the fire would make their way all the way from the back of the aircraft until the cockpit.

With the loss of the FDR, investigators did not have access to the specific rates of descent during the emergency. Using radar observations from the ATC, it was found that the flight descended from 30,000 feet to 19,000 feet (5,800 m) in only 10 minutes and 45 seconds (1,028 ft/min (18.80 km/h)). The officer also repeatedly stated to the captain that "You want to get down faster," indicating that the emergency descent was performed at too slow a speed. At the same time, the captain was also distracted with the cabin's pressurisation. The investigation could not determine the nature of the issue nor if there truly was one.

Regarding the performance of the ATC, the investigation did not note any issues from during taxi to until the notification of the fire. Although the flight was given priority consideration, it was not given an emergency frequency and throughout the accident flight, it operated on the same frequency as all other aircraft in the same range. This resulted in some communication interference between the crew and the ATC. The controller responded appropriately to the pilots confirming needing stand-by fire equipment at the airport, but used incorrect terminology when giving out altitude clearances as the aircraft was returning to Jeddah. In addition, neither the crew or the controller considered the possibility of diverting to Taif International Airport, considering that by the time the flight crew decided to turn back to Jeddah, Taif was 93 nautical miles (172 km) away whilst Jeddah was 123 nautical miles (228 km) away.

In the end, investigators determined that the time it took to inform the flight crew of the fire, the captain's decision to delay a return to Jeddah despite being made aware of the fire, as well as performing the emergency descent at too slow of speed and also trying to depressurise the cabin, made the crew lose valuable time. Despite the errors made, the investigation noted that even if none of these actions had occurred, the outcome would "in all probability have been the same."

=== Conclusions ===
In their conclusion, the Accident Investigation Board found that the probable cause of the crash was "an in-flight fire in the cabin area which, through its intensity and rapid extension, resulted in panic among the passengers and smoke in the cockpit, eventually incapacitating the flight crew." It also recommended that PIA review how they train their cabin crew, stressing the need for flight attendants to report any unusual occurrence to the pilots as quickly as possible, especially, in this case, a fire, and for pilots to follow emergency instructions in the event of a fire without hesitation. The board also suggested that controllers in Saudi Arabia be made aware of the country's numerous minimum safe altitudes, and that in the event of an emergency, a separate frequency for communication be assigned.

== See also ==
- Saudia Flight 163, another accident due to on-board fire also held in Saudi Arabia. The plane managed to land, but a flashover fire and failure during evacuation resulting the death of all 301 people on board.
