= Baikal Airlines Flight 130 =

1994 aviation accident

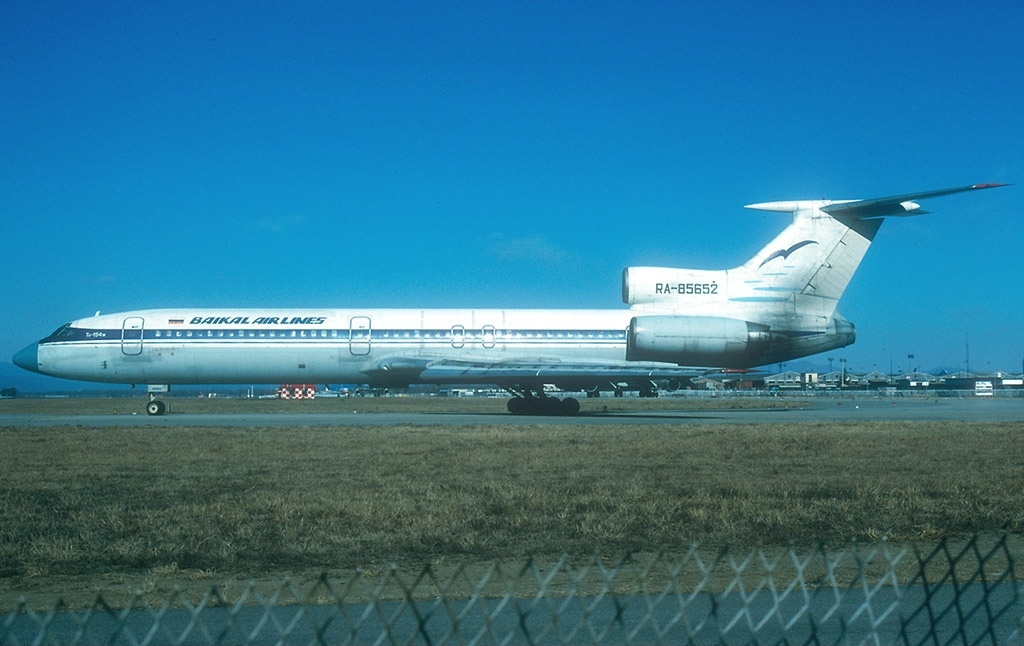
- A Baikal Airlines Tupolev Tu-154M, similar to the aircraft involved in the accident

Accident
- Date: 3 January 1994
- Summary: Uncontained engine failure, in-flight fire
- Site: Mamony, near International Airport Irkutsk, Irkutsk, Russia
- Total fatalities: 125
- Total injuries: 1

Aircraft
- Aircraft type: Tupolev Tu-154M
- Operator: Baikal Airlines
- IATA flight No.: X3130
- ICAO flight No.: BKL130
- Call sign: BAIKAL 130
- Registration: RA-85656
- Flight origin: International Airport Irkutsk, Irkutsk, Russia
- Destination: Domodedovo International Airport, Moscow, Russia
- Occupants: 124
- Passengers: 115
- Crew: 9
- Fatalities: 124
- Survivors: 0

Ground casualties
- Ground fatalities: 1
- Ground injuries: 1

Baikal Airlines Flight 130 was a scheduled domestic passenger flight from Irkutsk to Moscow operated by a Baikal Airlines Tupolev Tu-154 that crashed onto a dairy farm on 3 January 1994 in Mamony whilst the pilots were trying to return to the airport following a mid-air emergency. All 124 people on board were killed. Another person was killed on the ground.

With 125 deaths, it remains as the deadliest crash in Russia during the 1990s.

The investigation conducted by Russian MAK concluded that the crash was caused by loss of control due to an in-flight fire. One of the Tupolev Tu-154's engine starters failed in mid-flight and broke apart. The failure inflicted damages on the oil lines and hydraulic lines around the engine, igniting uncontrollable flames. The flight crew attempted to return to the airport, but due to the damaged hydraulic lines they could not control the aircraft and it crashed onto the farm.

== Aircraft ==
The aircraft was a Tupolev Tu-154M with a manufacturer serial number of 89A801, equipped with three D-30KU-154 turbofan engines. It was built in May 1989 and had its first flight with Aeroflot. Prior from being transferred to Baikal Airlines, the aircraft was registered as CCCP-85656. It was purchased by Baikal Airlines in 1992 and re-registered to RA-85656 in 1993.

== Passengers and crew ==
Nationality	Total
Russia	109
Germany	10
China	4
Austria	1
India	1
Japan	1
Total	124

Flight 130 was carrying 115 passengers and 9 crew members. Then-Minister of Transport Vitaly Efimov stated that the aircraft was carrying 4 extra passengers who were not listed on the official manifest.

Majority of those on board were Russians, but Baikal Airlines confirmed that there were at least 17 foreigners on board. The manifest released by the airline showed that there were 10 Germans, 4 Chinese, one Austrian, one Indian and one Japanese. The rest were Russians. There were 5 children and one infant on board the aircraft. Most of the passengers were tourists who had just finished their vacation in Lake Baikal.

The flight crew were consisted of the following:

- Captain Gennady Stepanovich Padukov, who had a flying experience of more than 16,000 hours
- First Officer A. G. Zhavoronkov
- Navigator V. I. Molnar
- Flight Engineer Ilya Petrovich Karpov, with a total flying experience of around 14,000 hours
- Inspector O. V. Likhodievsky

== Accident ==
=== Before take-off ===
Flight 130 was scheduled to take off at around 12:00 p.m., heading to Moscow with 115 passengers and 9 crew members. Most of the passengers were tourists who were heading home from holidaying at Lake Baikal. The flight was commanded by Captain Gennady Padukov, and his co-pilot was First Officer A. Zhavoronkov. The flight would normally take around five hours.

Following the aircraft's fuelling, the flight crew requested clearance and started the engines. Engines one and three started normally, but engine two failed to start and did not respond to a restart attempt. Nearly 17 minutes later, they finally managed to light the final engine. Frustrated, Captain Gennady could be heard telling his co-workers "to tell the engineers that had prepared the engines prior to the flight that they had done their job poorly.".

A red light warning suddenly turned on. The light warned the crew about the dangerous speed of the air start unit on engine two. Flight engineer Karpov, who was initially perplexed, tried to turn off the light, but failed. He informed the issue to the pilots, who discussed the problem.

Flight Engineer	It's on fire... and does not turn off, and does not go out.
Captain	What?
First Officer	... this one lit up and does not turn off, and does not go out. Dangerous speed... Starter of the air, second engine... Well, just now, after starting.
Captain	Is the starter turning or not? Is the starter turned off?
Flight Engineer	It is!

After some deliberations, they decided to ignore it altogether. Knowing that they had faced the same problem before, they paid it little attention and continued with the flight. The crew then began taxiing to the runway, but Karpov remained pre-occupied with the alarm, as the light remained illuminated in front of his seat.

Flight Engineer	Where could they have lit up?
Captain	What are you talking about? [It] will warm up, [it] will go out.
Flight Engineer	...everything is off, no air is supplied....
Captain	Is the starter off?
Flight Engineer	Off

The problematic engine was not turned off and the crew continued preparing for takeoff. After finishing the takeoff checklist and configuring the aircraft, the engine thrust was set to takeoff power, and Flight 130 took off at 11:59 local time.

=== Start of failure ===
Barely 4 minutes after takeoff, just when the aircraft was about to reach an altitude of 6,000 meters, the fire alarm suddenly blared. Flight engineer Karpov announced that a fire had broken out on the defective engine two. It was turned off and the crew immediately followed the established procedure for in-flight fire, but the alarm continued.

The flight crew then tried to douse the flames by turning on the fire extinguishing system, which operated until exhausting its mixture. However, flight engineer Karpov later reported that fires were still present on engine two, and now had spread to the APU compartment. Due to the quick spread, Captain Gennady decided to return to Irkutsk for an emergency landing. The navigator immediately charted their course. Meanwhile, the siren continued to sound.

Captain	We are gaining 6000 (meters)...
Commentary	(sound signal - continuous siren)
Flight Engineer	Second engine burns for some reason.
Captain	The APU is on fire? Turn it off!!
Flight Engineer	Turned on all three lines.
Captain	Is it on fire? Is it really on fire?
Flight Engineer	The "Fire" sign is on.
Captain	Ilya Petrovich, report the situation.
Flight Engineer	So. The "Fire" sign in engine nacelle #2 has lit up. I have turned off the second engine.
Captain	Ilya, turn off the siren...
Navigator	We are setting a return landing course!

The ATC quickly approved Flight 130 for an emergency landing and ordered them to descend to 900 ft for an approach from the south of the airport.

After radioing the ATC for an emergency landing, Karpov realized that the hydraulic pressures had dropped. First Officer Zhavoronkov then announced that the landing gear would be extended, but the landing gear remained stuck inside the wheel well. Captain Gennady noted that the landing gear could not be extended at all and asked the crew to use the second hydraulic systems, to which Karpov replied that there was basically no pressure from the second system either.

Flight Engineer	Pressure in the first hydraulic system has dropped!...
First Officer	Extending the landing gear!...
Dispatcher	656th acknowledged.
Captain	The landing gear won't release at all... It won't release! Give it to the second hydraulic system!
Flight Engineer	No, it won't! There's no pressure!
First Officer	Pressure has dropped in both hydraulic systems!

=== Crash ===
With the absence of hydraulics, the crew tried to maintain the level of hydraulics by whatever means possible, but their efforts failed when the hydraulics ran out. First Officer Zhavoronkov then told the crew that the aircraft was uncontrollable. The aircraft kept descending, gaining speed tremendously and slightly banked to the right. The pilots desperately tried to raise the nose.

First Officer	Guys, the plane is out of control! The plane is out of control!
Dispatcher	You're flying below the glide path!
Commentary	Sound of continuous siren
Dispatcher	Work with the landing!!
Commentary	End of recording

External videos
- Immediate aftermath
- A video of the immediate aftermath of the crash on YouTube

Local residents reported loud rumbling sounds coming from the sky. A tractor driver on the farm saw the aircraft coming towards him at terrific speed. At 12:08 p.m, less than 10 minutes after taking off, the aircraft crashed at a speed of 510 km/h (280 kn; 320 mph) into a dairy farm in the village of Mamony, 15 kilometres (9.3 mi; 8.1 nmi) from Irkutsk airport. The cockpit and the first passenger cabin were destroyed, and the second passenger cabin and tail were propelled 400 metres (1,300 ft; 440 yd) beyond the initial point of impact before disintegrating.

All 115 passengers and 9 crew members on board were killed. A farm building was destroyed; a male occupant was killed, and a female occupant survived with major burns. Additionally, several dozen cattle were killed. A total of 125 people died, of whom only 74 could be identified.

== Investigation ==
=== In-flight fire ===
The rapid loss of control was caused by a fire that spread quickly within the No. 2 engine compartment. The rapid spread resulted from the fire's location, and the circumstances that caused it. After the engine completely failed, it exploded outwards, and some pieces sliced the fuel and hydraulic lines within the compartment.

The sequence of events began when the flight crews were starting the engines. The crew faced difficulty with the No. 2 engine, while the others had started normally. During their attempts, they noticed that the No. 2 engine's turbo compressor had spontaneously rotated, which should have happened only had they pressed the air bleeding button, which they had not. When they had successfully started all of the engines, a red alarm light suddenly turned on, warning the crew that the engine starter of the No. 2 engine had reached a dangerous level of rotational speed.

The crews knew the design of the Tupolev Tu-154 and deemed it impossible for such a thing to happen, so they rejected the warning as a false alarm. The light remained illuminated as the speed remained at a dangerous speed; however, the flight manual stated that such an alarm was not a cause for an emergency and would not require immediate action. As the engine parameters remained at normal values, the crew decided to continue for takeoff.

As the thrust lever was set for takeoff power, the rotational speed increased tremendously. After lifting off, the crew turned on the air bleed system for the engines. The air starter then spun intensively until passing 40,000 rpm, far beyond its maximum rotation point. Added with the high temperature of the compartment, the turbine blew apart. The gearbox and turbine shaft exploded, blowing the casing of the No. 2 engine outwards and slicing nearby hydraulic lines and fuel lines. The heat that had been caused by the failure produced flames on the engine's gearbox as the oil that coated the component had ignited. This was fed by fuels and hydraulic fluids from the ruptured lines, resulting in a larger flame. The fire siren eventually sounded inside the cockpit, warning them of the fire.

The crew had tried using all of the Tu-154's fire-extinguishing system and all three stages of extinguishing, but they failed as the fire didn't go out. The engine had failed in a violent manner in which parts of the starter turbine had ruptured the casing of the combustion chamber. The debris pierced the outer casing from the inside, creating a 1 meter opening within the compartment. As the fire was still fed by air, it kept growing instead. Knowing that the fire would grow uncontrollably, the crew decided to turn back towards Irkutsk to land as quickly as possible.

By now, all three hydraulic lines had been damaged by the growing fire, causing the hydraulic pressure to become unstable. The depleting fluids caused the pressure to drop, and the aircraft became uncontrollable. The fire siren eventually went out, either because the fire had grown so large that it had destroyed the electrical circuit or that the fire had been extinguished by itself as it no longer had fuel to feed. The crew could not slow down the aircraft and tried everything to avoid a collision, but the absence of hydraulics caused the aircraft to be not budged by the crew's attempts.

=== Defective aircraft ===
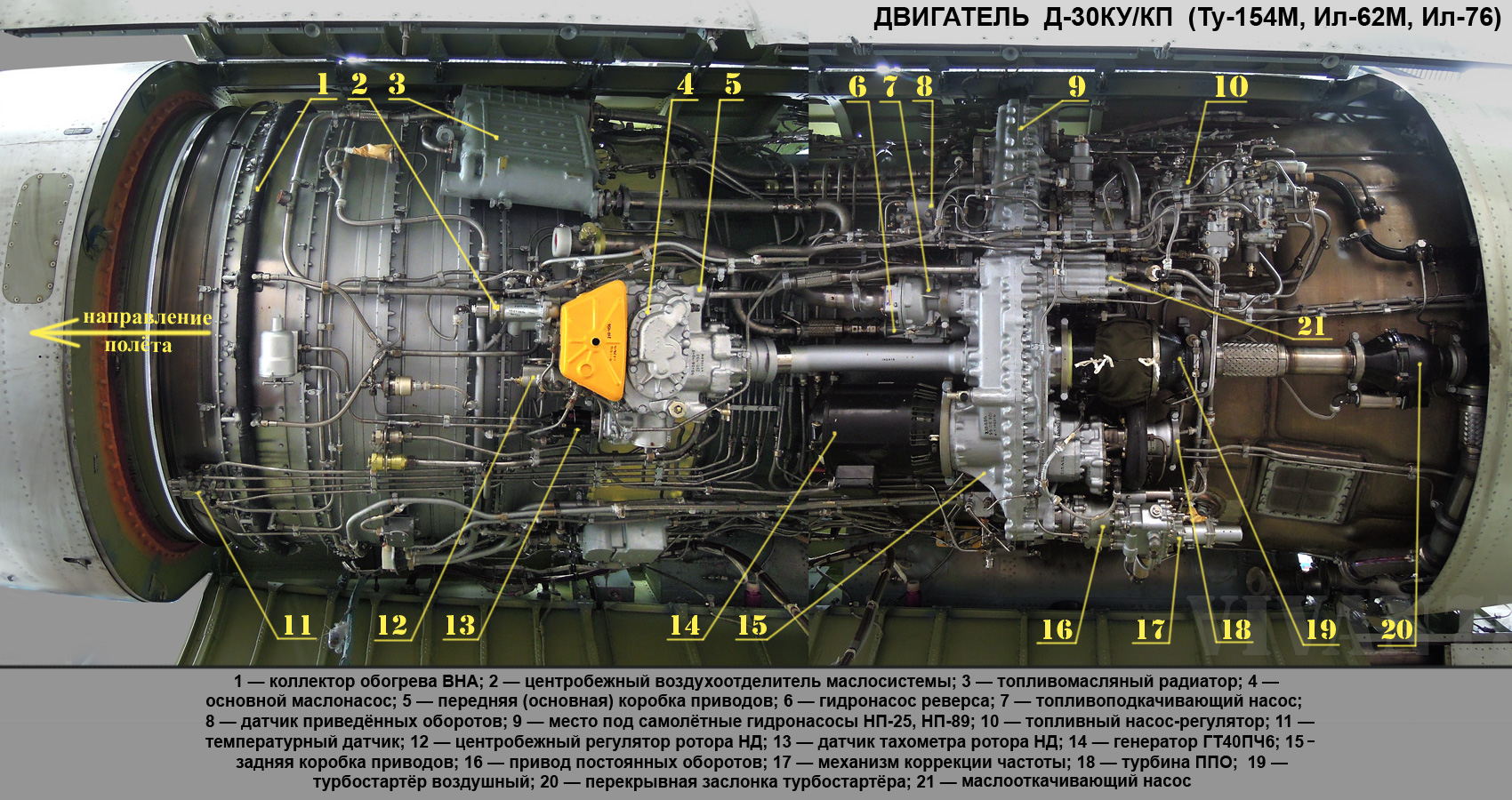
A Soviet D-30KU jet engine. No. 19 denotes the air starter of the engine.

Examination of the engines showed that the failure might have been caused by a foreign object inside the air starter, presumably fragments from the air-to-air radiator guide vanes that had fallen into the area. The presence of such an object inside the compartment caused the pressure damper of the engine starter to not be able to close. Pressurised air was constantly supplied into the engine, causing it to spontaneously spin even when the crew had not pressed the button to start it. When the crew lighted up the engine, the already-spinning turbine progressively spun faster until it reached a dangerous level.

When taking off, the alarm didn't sound regarding the engine. Even though there was a small opening which caused constant air supply, the engine was still rotating within the limits as the air bleed valve was not opened by the crew. During the climb, the crew finally opened the valve by pressing the air bleed button on. Immediately, the air starter inside the No.2 engine began to rapidly spun, reaching 40,000 rpm. High rotational speed, added with the increasing heat of the engine itself, caused the air starter turbine disk to break apart.

The engine failed in a violent manner, in which the blown turbine caused the fuel supply pipelines located nearby to be sliced. Hot condition within the compartment caused the fuel to ignite, producing flames inside the compartment. As the explosion of the engine had caused opening within the compartment and the outer casing of the engine, the fire didn't get extinguished and kept growing as it was still being fed by air from the outside. The crew could not contain the fire as the aircraft's fire-extinguishing system was ineffective.

The investigation noted that the proximity of the hydraulic lines to the engine would be classified as a design flaw. The aircraft involved in the accident, the Tupolev Tu-154M, was an upgraded version of its predecessors. In the previous Tupolev aircraft, the hydraulic lines were not concentrated together. In the Tupolev Tu-154M, all three hydraulic lines of the entire aircraft were concentrated on the No.2 engine. The hydraulic pipelines were not made with fire-resistant material and heat-protective screens.

IAC stated that the aircraft's No.2 engine had suffered problems twice prior to the accident. During an approach to Guangzhou, China, the engine suddenly failed and the crew had to do an emergency landing. A complaint was eventually made to the maintenance; however, it was unknown whether the issue was rectified. The investigation concluded that the aircraft should not have been flown that day due to its unworthy condition.

=== Structural problems ===
The cause of the catastrophic engine failure was regarded as a special case by the investigation committee. Due to the unusual nature of the engine failure (i.e., spontaneous rotation prior to start-up), the crew could not comprehend the cause of it. Findings by the IAC showed that the existing manuals had not addressed such issue, which would have provided the correct actions for the pilots to use to handle such situations. The correct action would have been to turn off the malfunctioning engine, even with normal flight parameters, but due to the absence of a manual, the crew decided to take off as they didn't think that the situation was severe. The flight crews were also not trained to face such failure during their training and hence did not know the correct action to take.

The flight crews at the time didn't think that the alarm was an emergency, as they thought that the design of the Tupolev Tu-154 would not have made it possible to happen. The previous predecessor of the Tu-154M variant was equipped with a check valve, which would shut off the supply of air to the engine starter. However, a modification was made with the Tu-154M model in which said valve was moved to another location. Such design changes, remarkably, were not documented into diagrams or sheets for the crew to read. Findings from the investigation concluded that the changes had never been publicly disseminated to pilots, and no documentation could be found. The findings further suggested that the persistent idea that such a thing was impossible to happen was held by the flight engineer of Flight 130.

Apart from the incomplete manual and lack of information regarding the updated design, several shortcomings in the aircraft system were also noted. The warning light immediately lit up to warn the crew of the dangerous rotational speed, but the existing regulation at the time didn't classify such a warning as an emergency that required immediate action. This issue had actually been raised by Adviavigatel, and the company initially had tried to resolve the issue by introducing an audible alarm added with a warning light to warn the crew of the dangerous speed. Tupolev, instead, decided not to follow it, and no actions had been taken to improve the warning system regarding such issues.

=== Conclusion ===
The Russian investigation concluded that the crash was caused by a catastrophic engine failure due to the presence of a foreign object inside the No. 2 engine. The uncontained failure resulted in a destructive fire that further damaged the aircraft's hydraulic pipelines. Subsequently, the depleting hydraulic fluids caused the pilots to lose control of their aircraft.

The flight crews were not blamed for the crash, as the investigation concluded that they had followed the instructions that had been given and had done their job in accordance with the flight training that they had received, as well as demonstrating a high level of volitional and professional qualities.

== Aftermath ==
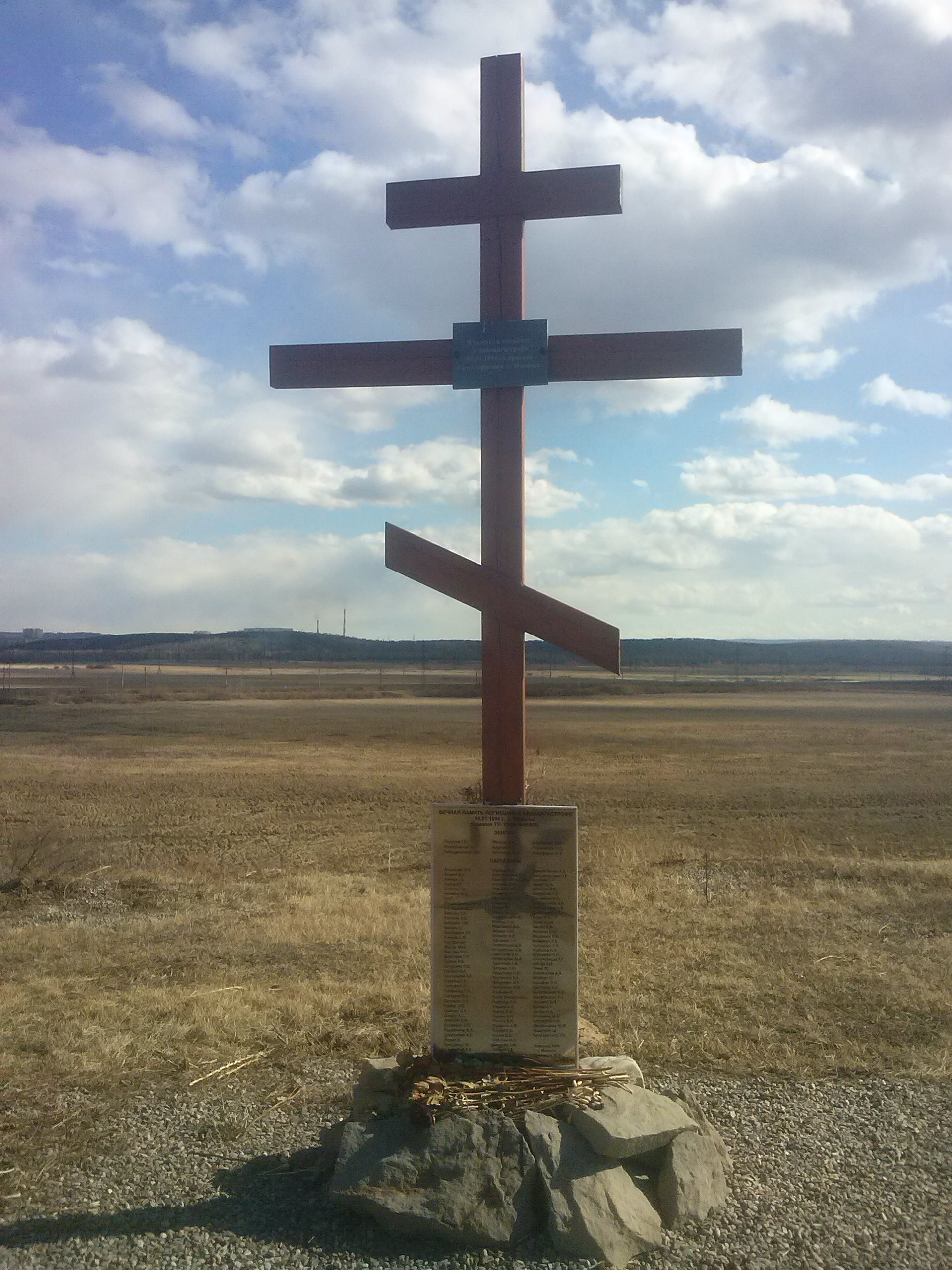
A cross with names of the victims of the crash

In response to the tragedy, the department of air transport issued all operators of the Tupolev Tu-154M to conduct a specialised in-depth inspection of the engines. The inspectors would be equipped with a special inspection list. Tupolev eventually updated their flight manual, and added guidance for pilots to use in case they faced similar problem in the future.

An inspection was also carried out on all air-to-air radiator guide vanes on all Tupolev Tu-154M. Several aircraft with defects on the radiator would be rectified.

Further measures were also taken in response to the investigation. A bulletin was issued to modify the air bleed system, and another inspection was conducted on the D-30KU engine. Additionally, authorities were considering on a modification on the design of the Tupolev Tu-154, in which its flaws, during the crash of Flight 130, had caused all vital system of the aircraft to not be able to be operated following isolated non-localized failure.

A wooden cross memorial with names of the victims were erected at the crash site. Every once a year, relatives of the victims held a commemoration at the site.

A project to build a church at the crash site by a local bishop was approved by Mamony parish council. The project would take around 12 years before completion. As of 2024, the project was still in progress. In another church near the crash site, a memorial wall with plaques bearing the names of the victims could be found within the church.

== See also ==
- Caspian Airlines Flight 7908, similar crash involving Tu-154 which lost control following an exploded turbine disc that managed to slice off the aircraft's hydraulic lines.
- United Airlines Flight 232, similar crash involving a McDonnell Douglas DC-10, which crash landed at Sioux Gateway Airport following loss of hydraulics due to an engine explosion.
