= Propair Flight 420 =

1998 aviation accident in Canada

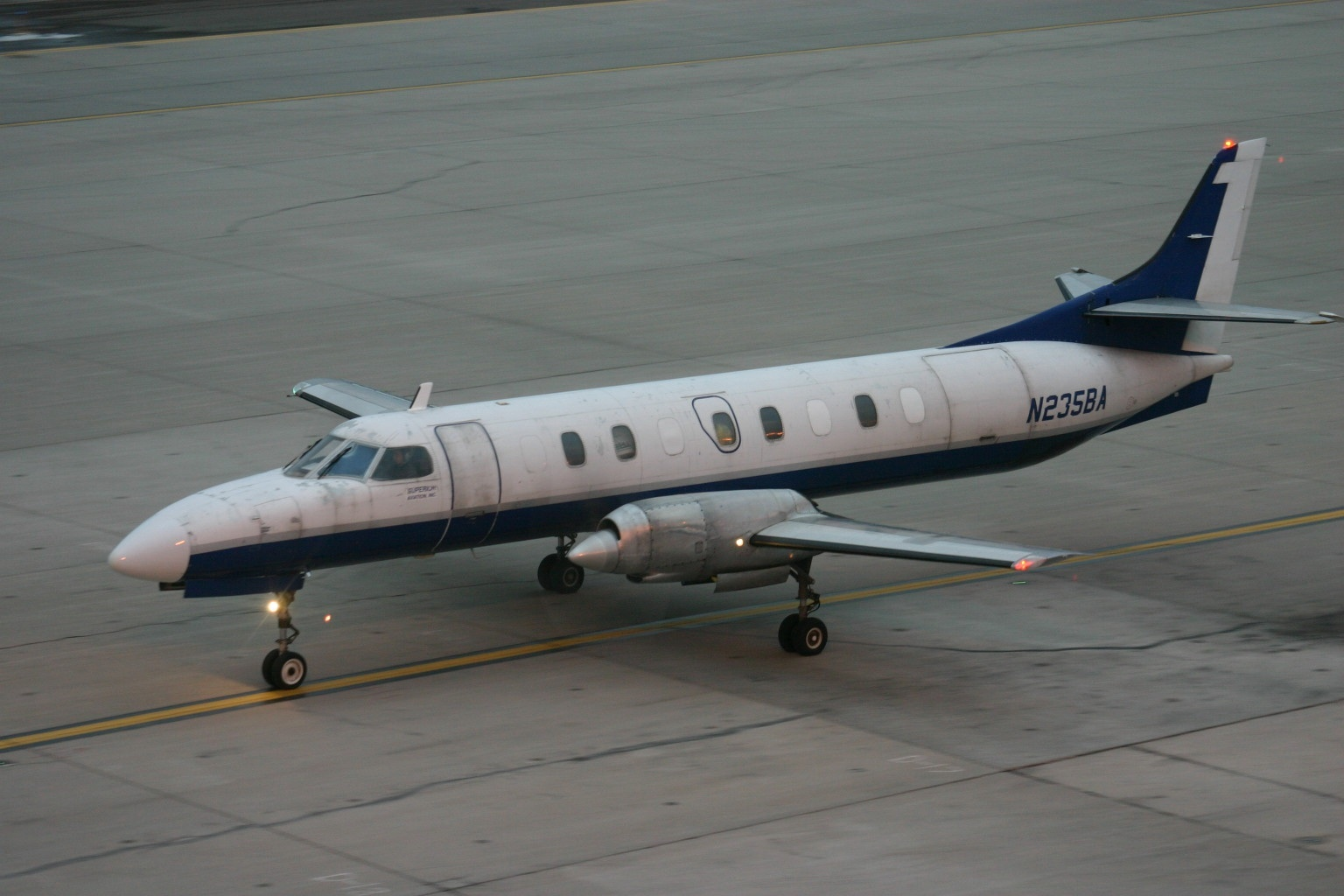
- A Fairchild Metroliner SA226, similar to the one involved in the accident

Occurrence
- Date: 18 June 1998
- Summary: Structural failure following in-flight fire
- Site: Montréal–Mirabel International Airport, Mirabel, Quebec, Canada; 45°40′47″N 74°02′19″W

Aircraft
- Aircraft type: Fairchild Metroliner SA226
- Operator: Propair
- Call sign: PROPAIR 420
- Registration: C-GQAL
- Flight origin: Dorval Airport, Montréal, Quebec, Canada
- Destination: Peterborough Airport, Ontario, Canada
- Occupants: 11
- Passengers: 9
- Crew: 2
- Fatalities: 11
- Survivors: 0

Propair Flight 420 (PRO420) was a domestic charter flight from Montreal, Quebec to Peterborough, Ontario. The flight was carried out by Propair, a charter airline based in Rouyn-Noranda, Quebec, using a Fairchild Swearingen Metroliner. On 18 June 1998, the aircraft suffered an in-flight fire shortly after take-off from Dorval and the crew elected to conduct an emergency landing at Montréal–Mirabel International Airport. The intense heat of the fire caused a structural failure in the left wing during the landing and the aircraft crashed, resulting in the deaths of all 11 passengers and crew on board.

The investigation conducted by the Canadian Transportation Safety Board revealed that the left brakes of Flight 420 had overheated during take-off, causing a fire inside the wheel-well which destroyed warning systems, as a result of which the crew was unaware of the severity of the fire, which subsequently ruptured hydraulic pipe-lines and spread to the left wing.

Following the accident, the Canadian TSB issued several recommendations, one of which was a recommendation to the FAA regarding the crew training and flight manual, and another being a recommendation to install an overheat warning system inside the wheel-wells of every Metroliner; before the accident, warning systems were not required on such aircraft.

== Flight ==
Propair Flight 420 took off from Dorval Airport (now Montréal–Pierre Elliott Trudeau International Airport) at 07:01 EDT carrying 9 passengers and 2 crew members. The flight was chartered by General Electric to transport personnel to a GE facility in Peterborough, Ontario. It was foggy at the time with light winds blowing from the right side of the aircraft. Flight 420 was cleared to 16,000 feet (4,877 m).

At 07:13, the crew of Flight 420 informed the tower that there was a decrease on the hydraulic pressure and requested to return to the airport. Dorval Tower cleared Flight 420's request to return and ordered them to descend to 8,000 feet (2,438 m) and make a 180-degree turn. At the time there was no indication that the flight was in grave danger.

Approximately 30 seconds after Flight 420's request to return, control problems started to occur. The aircraft became harder to control and a warning indicator showed that an engine problem was developing. 40 seconds later, the wing overheat warning system was illuminated. Before the crew had conducted the checklist for handling such an emergency, the warning light went off. 5 minutes later, the left engine appeared to be on fire. The crew later shut down the engine.

The aircraft could barely be controlled by the crew; an abnormal right aileron input was needed to keep the aircraft on heading. Dorval Tower then suggested that the crew divert to Montréal–Mirabel International Airport. The crew agreed. The fire intensified and the crew could see that fire was coming out from the engine nacelle. The crew then conducted emergency checklist and configured the aircraft for landing.

At 07:23, the crew stated that the fire in the left wing had died out. However, less than four minutes later, they announced that the fire had started again. The aircraft became harder to control and even started to roll. Maximum aileron trim were set by the crew. While Flight 420 was on short final, the landing gear was deployed.

When Flight 420 was near the runway threshold, the severely damaged left wing failed. The aircraft then rotated 90 degrees to the left: fuel spilled from the aircraft and ignited. The aircraft spiralled and crashed, coming to rest on the left side of Runway 24. Both crew members and all nine passengers on board died. Two passengers initially survived the crash, but ultimately died of their injuries.

== Passengers and crew ==
The flight was chartered by General Electric to transport their workers to their facility in Lachine, Quebec and Peterborough, Ontario. Flight 420 was carrying 9 passengers (initially reported 10). All of them were engineers, working as a team in the design of hydroelectric turbines, and were regular commuters.

Speaking on a press conference, Company President of Propair, Jean Pronovost, claimed that both pilots were, "very professional.”

The pilot of the flight was identified as 35-year-old Captain Jean Provencher. He began his pilot career as a first officer on the type in November 1986 to May 1996. He served as captain and as check pilot on similar aircraft types for several air carriers. In May 1996, he was hired by Propair as company chief pilot. He had accumulated a total of 6,515 flying hours, of which 4,200 of them were on the type.

The co-pilot was identified as 35-year-old Walter Stricker. Stricker began his pilot career in June 1995. In March 1998, he was hired as a first officer by Propair. He earned his first officer endorsement on May 9, and started his training and line check phase on May 13. He had accumulated a total of 2,730 flying hours, of which 93 of them were on the type.

== Investigation ==
Minutes before the crash, the crew of Flight 420 reported that there was a fire on board the aircraft. Inspection on Flight 420's wreckage confirmed that fire indeed had occurred in mid-flight. Constable Gilles Deziel, who had toured the crash site, stated that "three quarters of the plane was all burned and all black". Investigators then investigated the ignition source of the fire and conducted several tests.

=== Experiments on the equipment ===
Investigators found out that when pressures were added to the brakes, then there would be an increase in drag force and temperature on the assembly. Examination on the brake assembly of Flight 420 revealed that at the time, the brake assembly was exposed to a temperature of more than 600 °C (1,112 °F), which indicated that there was a significant amount of drag force at the time of the crash.

Another test was conducted by investigators to determine if hydraulic fluids of Flight 420 would ignite when it contacted the hot surface of the brake assembly. Investigators used two kinds of hydraulic fluids: the contaminated and uncontaminated ones. The result was that an intense fire broke out after it contacted with the hot surface. The test also revealed that the contaminated hydraulic fluids have a lower ignition point than the uncontaminated one.

=== Sequence of events ===
Investigators noticed that during Flight 420's take off roll, the aircraft had pulled to the left and the crew had to apply right rudder input in order to correct the path of the aircraft. The aircraft also took longer to reach take-off speed than usual. These indications were consistent with the presence of drag force on the left brakes, possibly caused by incomplete retraction of the brake disks, or a faulty parking brake. Examination of the left brakes confirmed that they had indeed been dragged.

The crew did not notice that the left brakes had been dragging during the take off roll and had overheated. The overheated brakes were retracted by the crew and entered the wheel wells. The wheel wells subsequently closed to secure the wheels. The wheel wells did not have sufficient cooling, and so the temperature of the brakes continued to rise, reaching as high as 600 °C (1,112 °F).

The overheated brakes and wheels then spread the heat to the tires and the surrounding structures. Tests conducted by investigators revealed that when tire fragments came into contact with overheated brakes, they ignited. The tire was exposed to a temperature of 600 °C (1,112 °F), igniting a fire. The situation was worsened when a Nitrile piston leaked its flammable fluid. The Nitrile Piston would start to degrade when it contacted a surface temperature of 135 °C (275 °F). The flammable liquid contacted the fire, causing an intense flame.

A brake overheat warning system would have warned the crew that there was a problem. However, no such system was required on this type of aircraft, so Flight 420's crew had no idea that a fire had developed. The fire then ruptured the aircraft's hydraulic line, located near the wheel well, which caused the fire to intensify.

An orange warning light then went on to warn the crew that an overheating had occurred in the left wing (where the fire was currently spreading). Before the crew could initiate the checklist to handle the emergency, the warning light suddenly went off. They mistakenly thought that the emergency had ended. However, the ceasing of the warning was due to the fire destroying the warning system's electrical circuit.

The crew never realized the severity of the fire, which had grown out of control and begun degrading the structural integrity of the left wing. This caused the crew to have severe difficulty in controlling the aircraft. The crew had to apply maximum aileron trim setting due to the reduction of the stiffness of the wing. The left wing then failed, buckling upwards, causing the aircraft to roll to the left through 90 degrees and crash, subsequently bursting into flames and killing everyone on board.

== In popular culture ==
The events of Propair Flight 420 were featured in the 2021 episode "Seconds from Touchdown", of the Canadian documentary TV series Mayday.
