= Mamony, Irkutsk Oblast =

Mamony (Irkutsk district) Мамоны
- Interactive map of Mamony (Irkutsk district)
- Location of Mamony (Irkutsk district) Mamony (Irkutsk district) (Russia)
- Coordinates: 52°26′N 104°56′E
- Country: Russia
- Federal subject: Irkutsk Oblast

Population (2010 Census)
  - Total: 3,154
  - Estimate (2021): 7,272 (+130.6%)
- Time zone: UTC+8 (MSK+5)
- Postal code: 664535
- OKTMO ID: 25612439101

Mamony is a village located in Irkutsky District, Irkutsk Oblast, Russia. The administrative center of the Mamony municipality, Mamony is located approximately 7 kilometres (4.3 mi; 3.8 nmi) west of Irkutsk.

== Name ==
Mamony began to develop after the Second World War. Before the war, there were several houses on its territory. The first buildings were put near the key in Old Mamonov by monks. In winter, they did not live in buildings, but with the onset of warm time, people appeared in small fields. The expansion of the mountainside led to the expansion of arable land, which was very necessary for forest land. At the end of the 19th century, the abbot of one of the Irkutsk monasteries turned to the governor with a request to allocate land for the monastery. The farm was managed by a man named Mamony. Thus, giving the town its name.

== Population ==
According to the 2010 Russian census, 3,154 people lived in the village (1,536 men and 1,618 women) in 2010.

== Plane crash ==
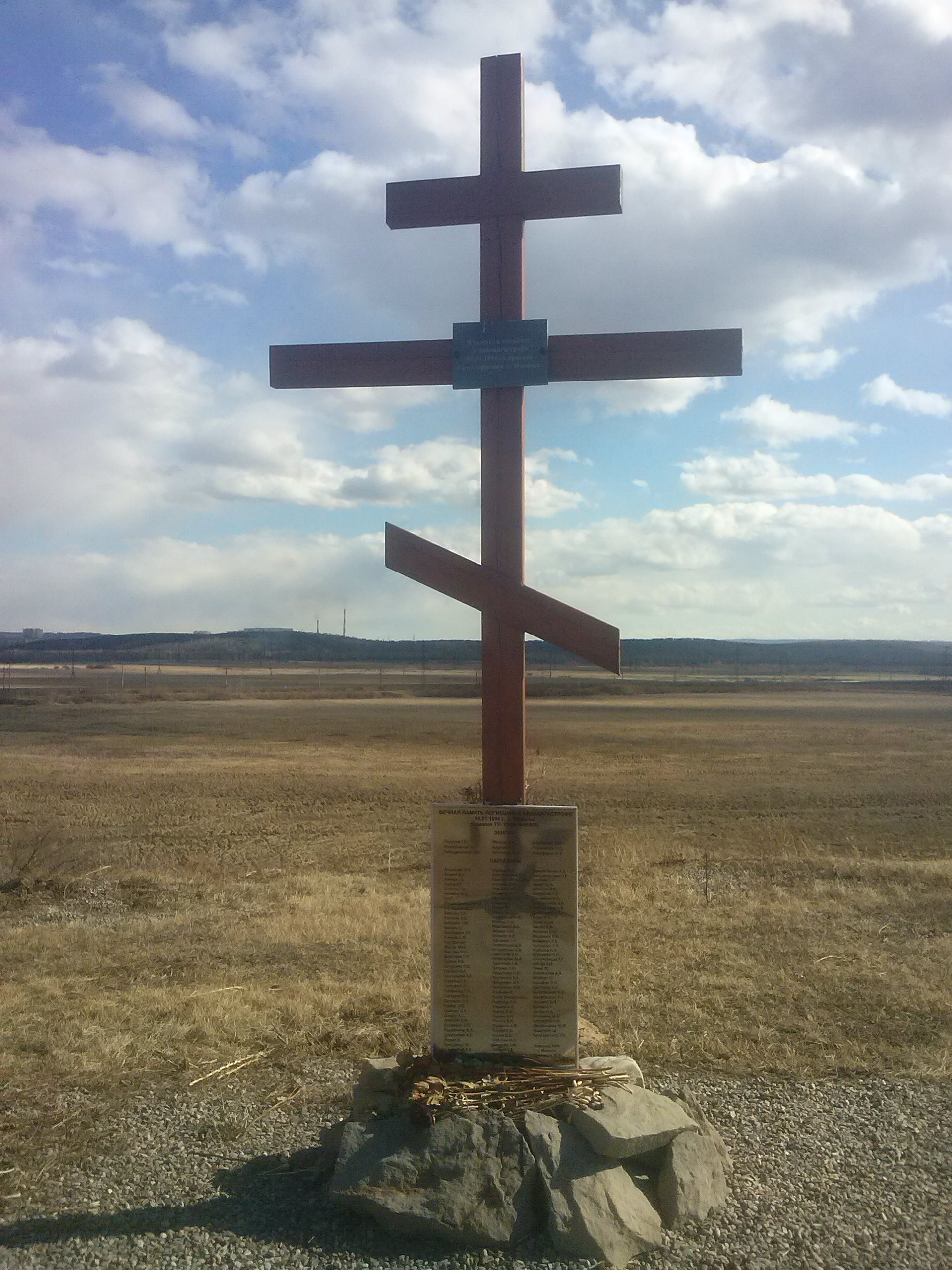
Memorial at the crash site

On 3 January 1994, Baikal Airlines Flight 130 crashed in Mamony, killing all 124 people on board along with one person on the ground, while injuring another.
