= American Airlines Flight 132 =

Airliner in-flight fire

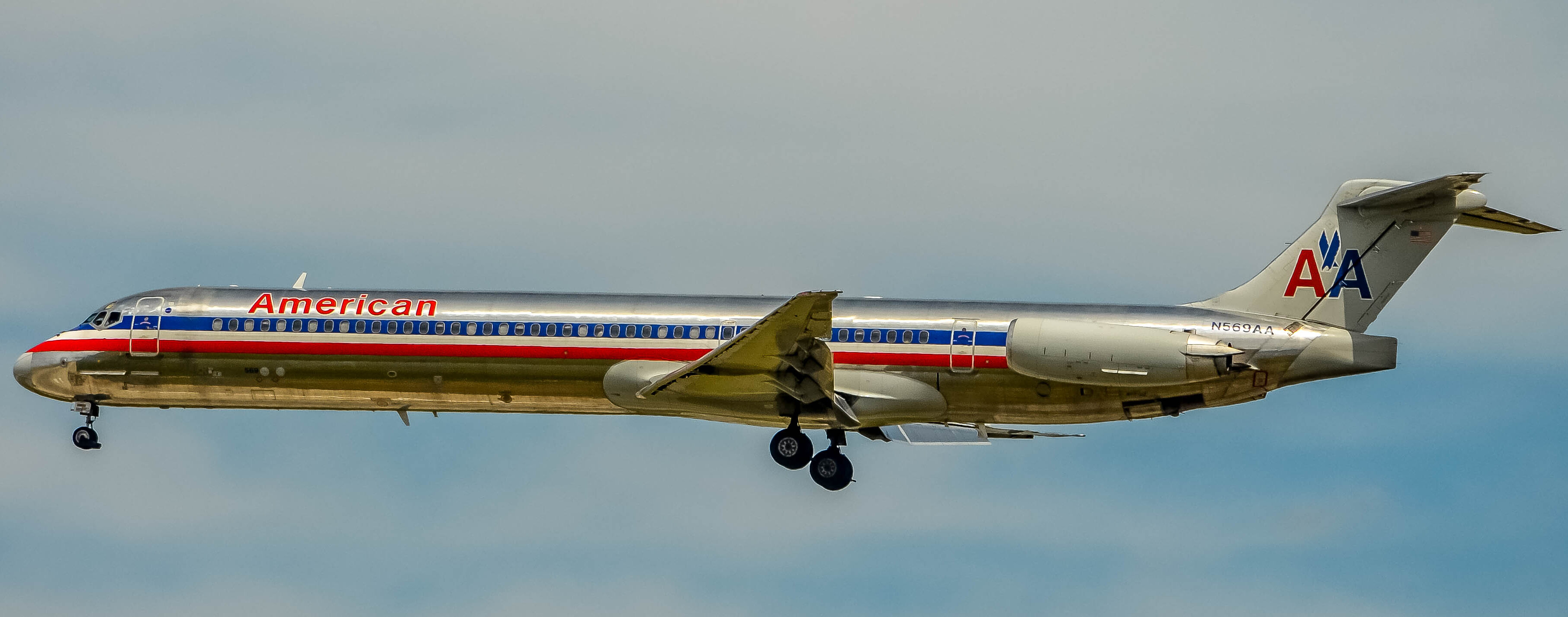
- N569AA, the aircraft involved in the incident, seen in 2015 after being repaired

Incident
- Date: February 3, 1988
- Summary: In-flight fire due to improperly stored hazardous material in the cargo hold
- Site: Nashville International Airport, Nashville, Tennessee, United States; 36°07′44″N 86°40′16″W

Aircraft
- Aircraft type: McDonnell Douglas MD-83
- Operator: American Airlines
- IATA flight No.: AA132
- ICAO flight No.: AAL132
- Call sign: American 132
- Registration: N569AA
- Flight origin: Dallas Fort Worth International Airport, Dallas, Texas
- Destination: Nashville International Airport, Nashville, Tennessee
- Occupants: 126
- Passengers: 120
- Crew: 6
- Fatalities: 0
- Injuries: 18
- Survivors: 126

American Airlines Flight 132 was a regularly scheduled flight from Dallas Fort Worth International Airport to Nashville International Airport. On February 3, 1988, the McDonnell Douglas MD-80 operating this route experienced an in-flight fire shortly before landing at its destination. There were no fatalities, but later investigations revealed that improperly stored hazardous materials caused a hydrogen peroxide reaction in the cargo hold that leaked and combined with a sodium orthosilicate based mixture in a container which was also improperly stored. As a result, regulations to prevent future incidents were adopted by the FAA, although these were not fully implemented until after the crash of ValuJet Flight 592 in 1996.

== Background ==
Before the aircraft took off, 6,365 lb (2,887 kg) of freight were loaded onto the aircraft. In addition to the passenger luggage being stored in the mid cargo component, there was a 104 lb (47 kg) fiber drum of textile treatment chemicals. These were undeclared and improperly packaged, along with hazardous materials inside the fiber drum, including five gallons of hydrogen peroxide solution and 25 lb (11 kg) of a sodium orthosilicate-based mixture, plus a 20 lb (9 kg) cylinder of oxygen. At 4:14 PM, the aircraft took off from Dallas Fort Worth International Airport.

== Incident ==
A few minutes before the aircraft landed in Nashville, passengers noticed smoke coming from the flooring. Passengers complained of a fire odor throughout the aircraft. The flooring of the aircraft was hot and becoming soft. They notified a flight attendant, who noted the odor of an electrical fire. However, he did not notice the hot floor. The flight attendant eventually noticed a haze and an "irritating odor of something burning" in the cabin. The flight attendant went to the back of the airplane to contact the first officer. The flight attendant said "we've got smoke in the cabin, we don't know where it's coming from" and maintained contact with the first officer for the remainder of the flight. Both the first officer and the flight attendant managed to communicate with the captain of the flight and told him that there was smoke in the cockpit. The captain asked if it was smoke or fumes and the first officer replied, "naw, it smells electrical" and could not identify the source either.

Meanwhile, a second flight attendant grabbed a fire extinguisher and proceeded to the problem area. She did not notice any flames or smoke. Additional flight attendants in the first class section reported condensation which she assumed was smoke. She responded to the area by removing seat cushions and felt the floor "looking for a source of a fire" in row 15. A passenger seated in row 16 reported a smell "similar to burning plastic or an acid reaction". A passenger in row 17 reported "haze" and looked for smokers on the aircraft and found no smokers, he sat back down and reported smoke rising from the floor vents on the airplane.

An American Airlines Boeing 727 first officer who was deadheading on the airplane reported that an attendant asked him to help find the cause of the smoke, and concluded that a fire was coming from the cargo compartment. He inspected the areas through rows 15 and reported that "the area is hot and the floors are beginning to get softer". The passengers in row 18, the area most affected, were moved to other seats. The captain asked again if the problems were fumes or smoke, the first officer reported that the floors were beginning to get "really soft" and said that they needed to land. When the first officer asked the flight attendant who was giving this information, she transferred the interphone to the deadheading first officer.

The deadheading first officer reported that the flooring in the middle of the aircraft was dropping out slightly, and that the pilot needed to expedite landing the airplane. The captain acknowledged the order with "we're gettin' it down now" and began landing the aircraft. The first officer in the cockpit requested trucks meeting the aircraft. The plane landed safely at Nashville International Airport shortly afterward, and was evacuated on Taxiway T-2.

After the airplane was evacuated, it was checked by the American Airlines Maintenance Department personnel. They opened the cargo compartment and saw little smoke in it. A few pieces of cargo were removed and the compartment was closed again. When firefighters arrived, the mid cargo compartment was reopened. The firefighters saw thick white and black smoke, but no flame. Water was sprayed into the compartment, and the firefighters saw steam.

A firefighter in protective breathing equipment noticed flames in the right rear corner of the compartment, he got out of the compartment and sprayed water into the aft section of the compartment until there were no signs of a fire. The floor and cargo area of the aircraft were slightly damaged, but the aircraft was eventually repaired and returned to service.
