= Deta =

Deta may refer to:

- Dielectric thermal analysis, an instrument for performing dielectric thermal analysis
- Diethylenetriamine, an organic compound with the formula HN(CH_{2}CH_{2}NH_{2})_{2}
- Deta, Romania, a town in western Romania
- Deta Hedman (born 1959), Jamaican-born, English darts player
- DETA Air, an airline, with bases in Almaty and Shymkent, Kazakhstan
- DETA Mozambique Airlines
