= Flight 540 =

Flight 540 may refer to:

- Lufthansa Flight 540, crashed on 20 November 1974
- ČSA Flight 540, crashed on 20 August 1975
