= Aria Air Flight 1525 =

2009 aviation accident

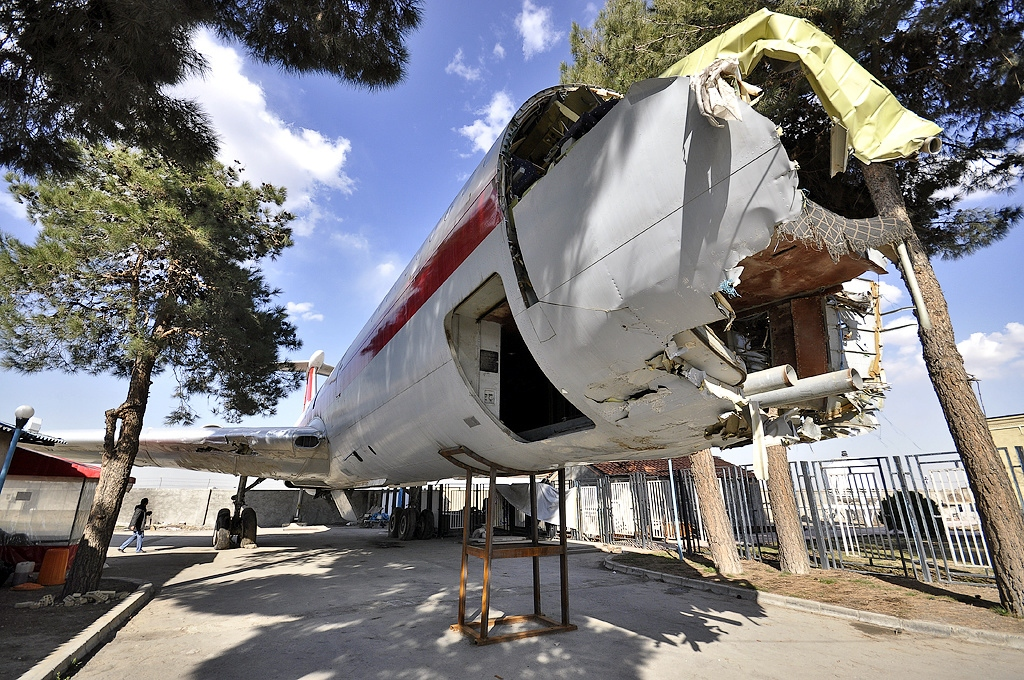
- Remains of the plane

Accident
- Date: 24 July 2009
- Summary: Runway overrun on landing
- Site: Mashhad International Airport, Mashhad, Iran; 36°14′06″N 59°38′27″E

Aircraft
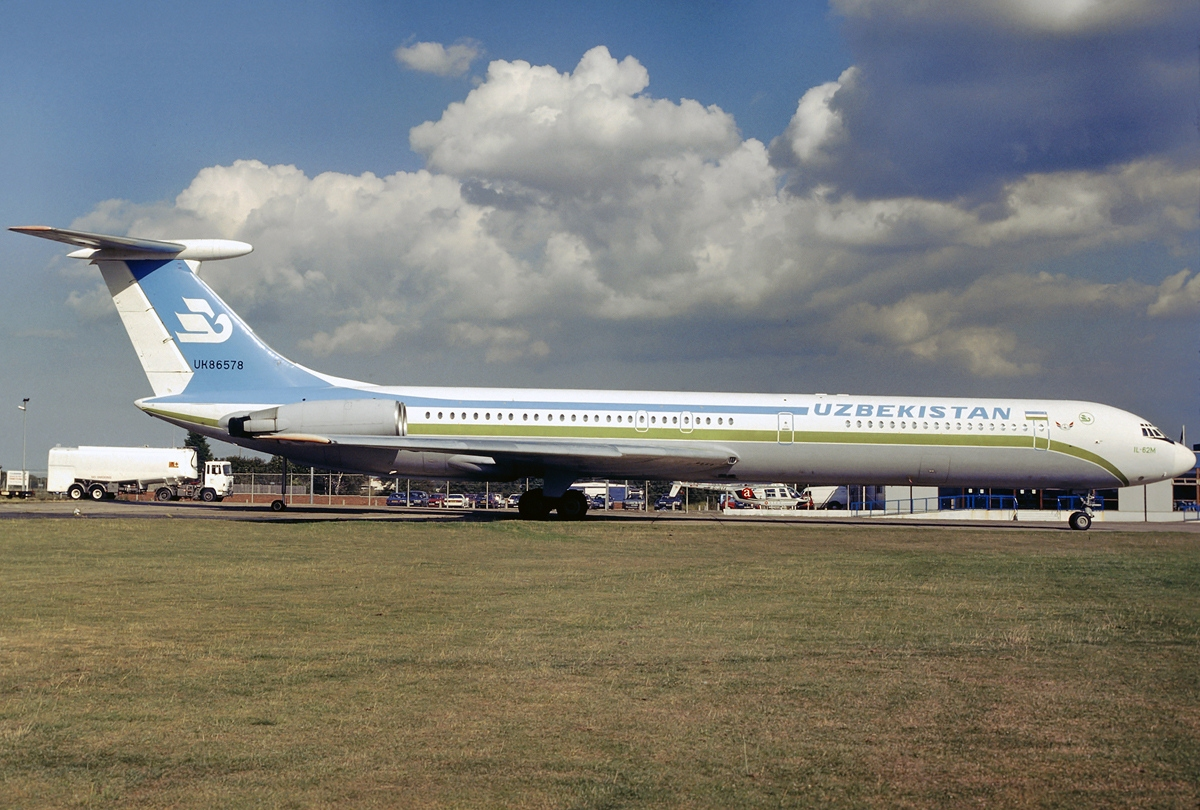
- The aircraft involved in the accident while still in service with Uzbekistan Airways in 1999
- Aircraft type: Ilyushin Il-62M
- Operator: Aria Air
- ICAO flight No.: IRX1525
- Call sign: ARIA 1525
- Registration: UP-I6208
- Flight origin: Mehrabad Airport, Tehran, Iran
- Destination: Mashhad International Airport, Mashhad, Iran
- Occupants: 173
- Passengers: 156
- Crew: 17
- Fatalities: 16
- Injuries: 31
- Survivors: 157

Aria Air Flight 1525 was a scheduled Iranian domestic flight which crashed on landing at Mashhad International Airport, Mashhad, Iran, on 24 July 2009.

== Aircraft ==
The aircraft involved was an Ilyushin IL-62M, registered UP-I6208. The aircraft entered service with Interflug on 1 June 1989 registered DDR-SEY. On 3 October 1990 it was re-registered D-AOAM, serving with Interflug until July 1991 when it was sold to Aeroflot and re-registered CCCP-86578. In January 1993 as a result of old Soviet Aeroflot assets splitting, it became part of the Uzbekistan Airways fleet and in March 1993 was re-registered UK-86578. In the early 2000s the aircraft was removed from service. In October 2007 it was leased to DETA Air of Kazakhstan, re-registered UN-86509 and then in July 2008 UP-I6208. It was leased to Aria Air in March 2009.

== Accident ==
The accident happened at 18:10 Iran Daylight Time (13:40 UTC). The aircraft overran the runway at high speed and crashed outside the airport perimeter, the nose area totally destroyed and resting on its tail. There was no fire. Sixteen people were killed. Among the dead were thirteen crew members and three passengers including Aria CEO Mehdi Dadpay. There were 157 survivors of the total of 173 people on board.

The aircraft was reported to have skidded off the runway. The cockpit area of the aircraft was destroyed by the impact with the airport perimeter wall. Nineteen people were reported to have been injured in the accident. The weather was good at the time of the accident, with the METAR in force at the time reading "METAR OIMM 241300Z 08014KT CAVOK 34/M03 Q1012 A2989". This translates as, METAR for Mashhad International Airport, issued on the 24th of the month at 13:00 UTC, wind at 14 knots (26 km/h), wind direction 080°; ceiling and visibility OK; temperature 34 °C; dew point −3 °C; altimeter 1012 millibars or 29.89 inches of mercury. It landed "long" and overran the end of the runway, hitting a wall located more than 1,100 metres (1,200 yd) further on, which demolished the forward section of the aircraft.

== Cause ==
According to the investigation by the Iranian Civil Aviation Organization, the approach speed along the glide path was 325 kilometres per hour (200 mph; 175 kn), which was about 50 kilometres per hour (30 mph; 25 kn) more than the recommended speed. Corrective action could have been taken, but the engine reverser and spoiler systems were not used correctly to reduce speed.

As a result of the accident, the Air Operators Certificate of Aria Air was suspended until the investigation ended.

== See also ==
- TAM Airlines Flight 3054
