= Tihamér Vujicsics =

Hungarian composer and ethnomusicologist (1929–1975)

- Тихомир Вујичић
- Born: February 23, 1929; Pomáz, Hungary
- Died: August 19, 1975 (aged 46); Near Damascus, Syria
- Occupations: Composer, ethnomusicologist, folk music collector
- Known for: Collecting and popularizing South Slavic folk music in Hungary

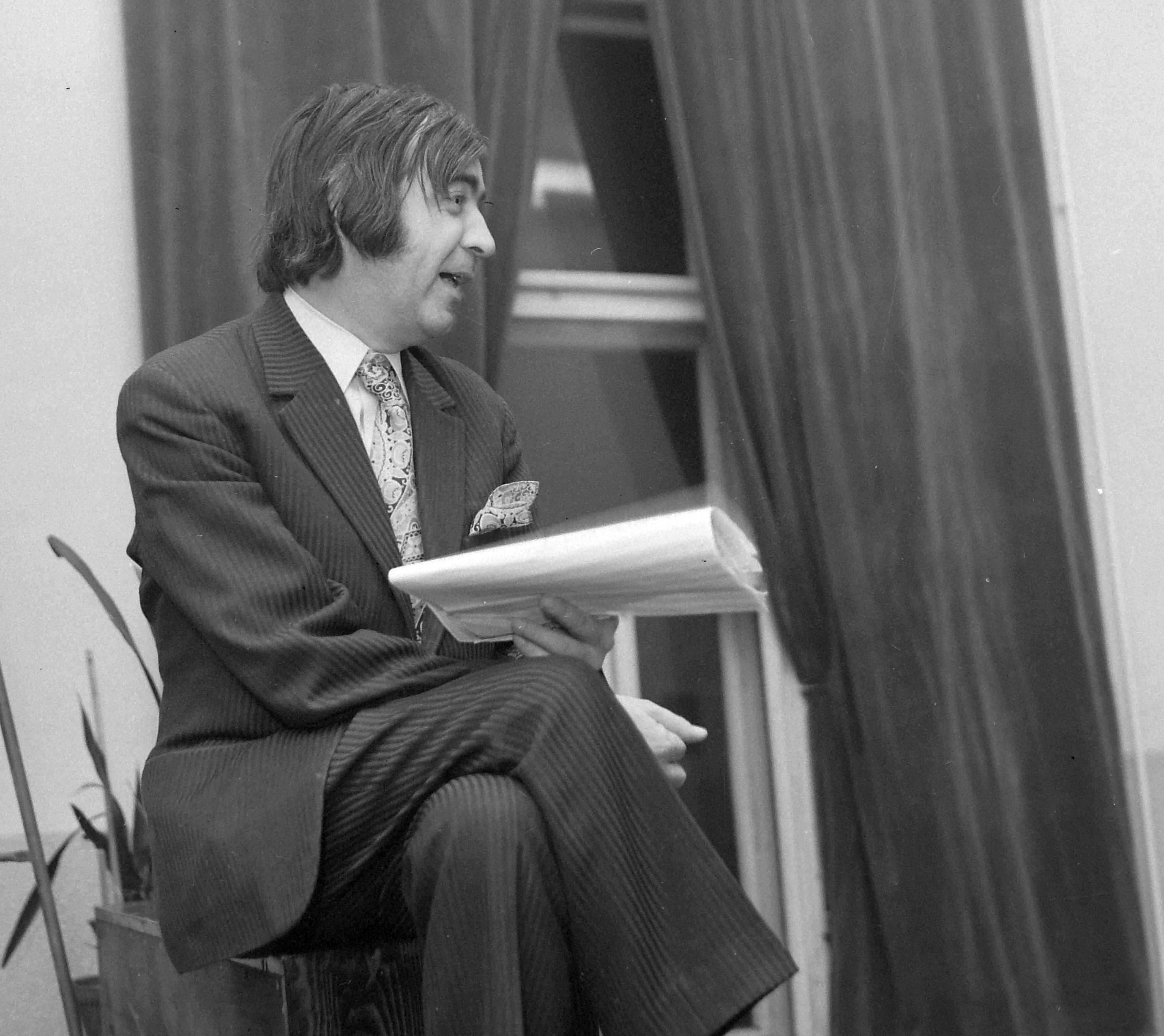

Tihamér Vujicsics (Serbian: Тихомир Вујичић / Tihomir Vujičić; 23 February 1929 – 19 August 1975) was a Hungarian composer, ethnomusicologist and folk music collector of Serbian descent. He is best known for his research into the folk music traditions of the South Slavs in Hungary and for composing music for more than 130 films and television productions.

== Early life and education ==
Vujicsics was born in Pomáz, Hungary. His father, Dušan Vujičić, was a vicar of the Eparchy of Buda. During the Second World War his family temporarily relocated to Hercegszántó, where he learned to play the tamburica, harmonica, recorder and violin, beginning a lifelong interest in folk music.

After the war he studied music in Budapest, first at the National Conservatory and later at the Liszt Ferenc Academy of Music, where he was a student of Sándor Veress and Ferenc Farkas. Following the communist takeover of Hungary, he was forced to leave the academy because of his Serbian background and continued his studies at the Béla Bartók Music Institute.

== Career ==
Vujicsics devoted much of his career to collecting, researching and promoting the traditional music of the South Slavic peoples of Hungary, especially Serbian communities. He also collected Macedonian, Šokac, Albanian, Persian and Arab folk music.

As a composer he wrote orchestral works, dance pieces, an opera, and music for approximately 137 films and television productions. His best-known scores include those for A Tenkes Kapitánya, Bors, Princ, a katona, and numerous Hungarian feature films of the 1960s and 1970s.

His posthumously published monograph The Musical Traditions of the South Slavs in Hungary, first published in 1978 and issued in a revised critical edition in 2020, remains a landmark work on the folk music traditions of the South Slavs in Hungary.

== Death ==
On 19 August 1975, Vujicsics was among the passengers aboard CSA Flight 540, an Ilyushin Il-62 flying from Prague to Damascus. The aircraft crashed while approaching Damascus, killing all 128 people on board.

== Legacy ==
The Vujicsics Ensemble, recipient of the Kossuth Prize, was named in his honour after his death. A music school in Szentendre and a public square in the town also bear his name.
