= Aviaenergo =

Russian airline

Aviaenergo Авиаэнерго
IATA	ICAO	Call sign
7U	ERG	AVIAENERGO
- Founded: 1992
- Ceased operations: 2011
- Hubs: Moscow Vnukovo Airport; Moscow Sheremetyevo Airport
- Fleet size: 5
- Headquarters: Moscow, Russia
- Key people: Alexandr Rafaelovich Blagonravov (General Director)
- Website: http://www.aviaenergo.ru

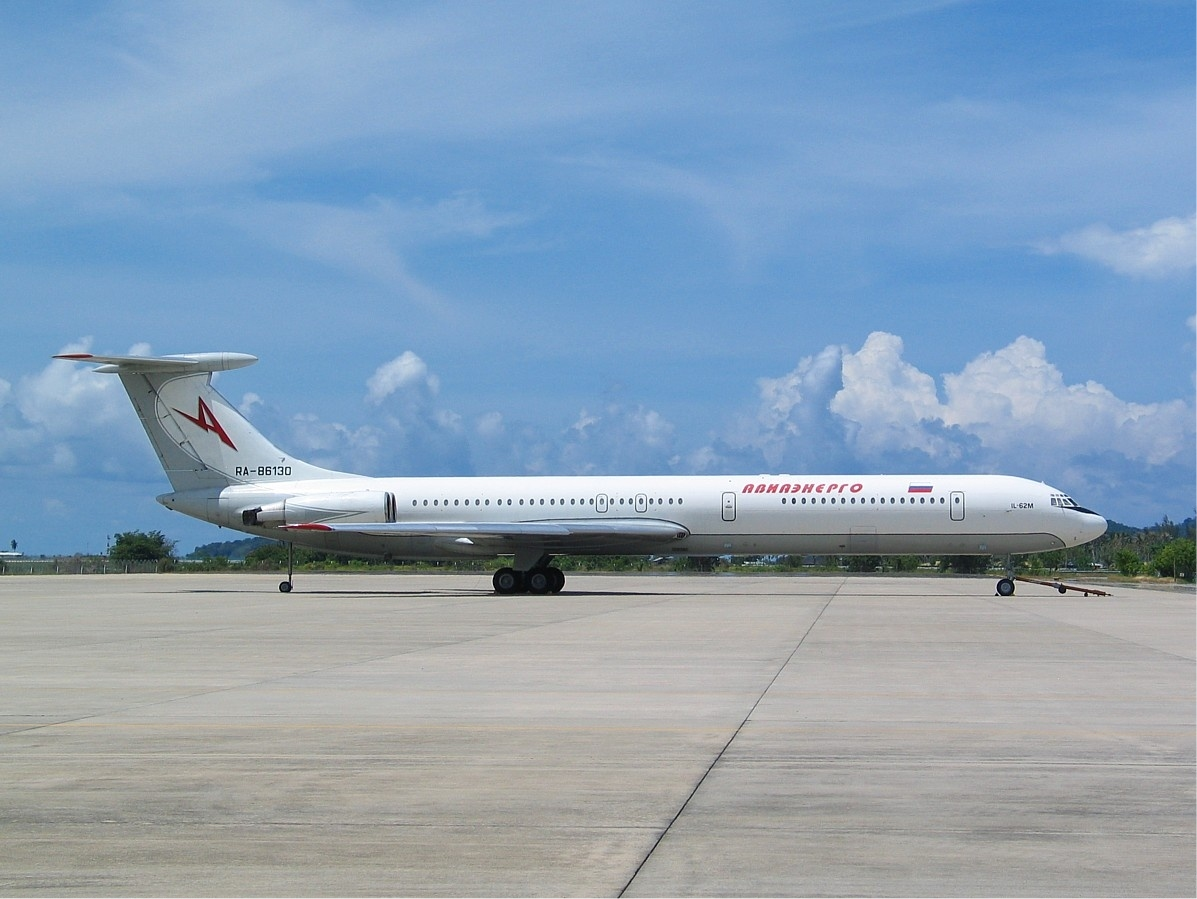
Ilyushin IL-62M

JSC Aviaenergo (Russian: ОАО «Авиакомпания «Авиаэнерго») was a charter airline with headquarters in Moscow, Russia. It was established on 31 December 1992 and operated charter flights within Europe and Asia, and other countries from its main base at Moscow Vnukovo Airport, as well as from Sheremetyevo International Airport. It was wholly owned by RAO UES, although UES, as part of its restructuring, had placed Avianergo on the market. Operations were suspended in 2011 due to poor financial performance (having approached bankruptcy in 2011)

== Fleet ==
The Aviaenergo fleet consisted of the following aircraft (as of 6 December 2009):

- 1 Ilyushin Il-62M
- 3 Tupolev Tu-154M
