= KAPO Avia =

Russian airline

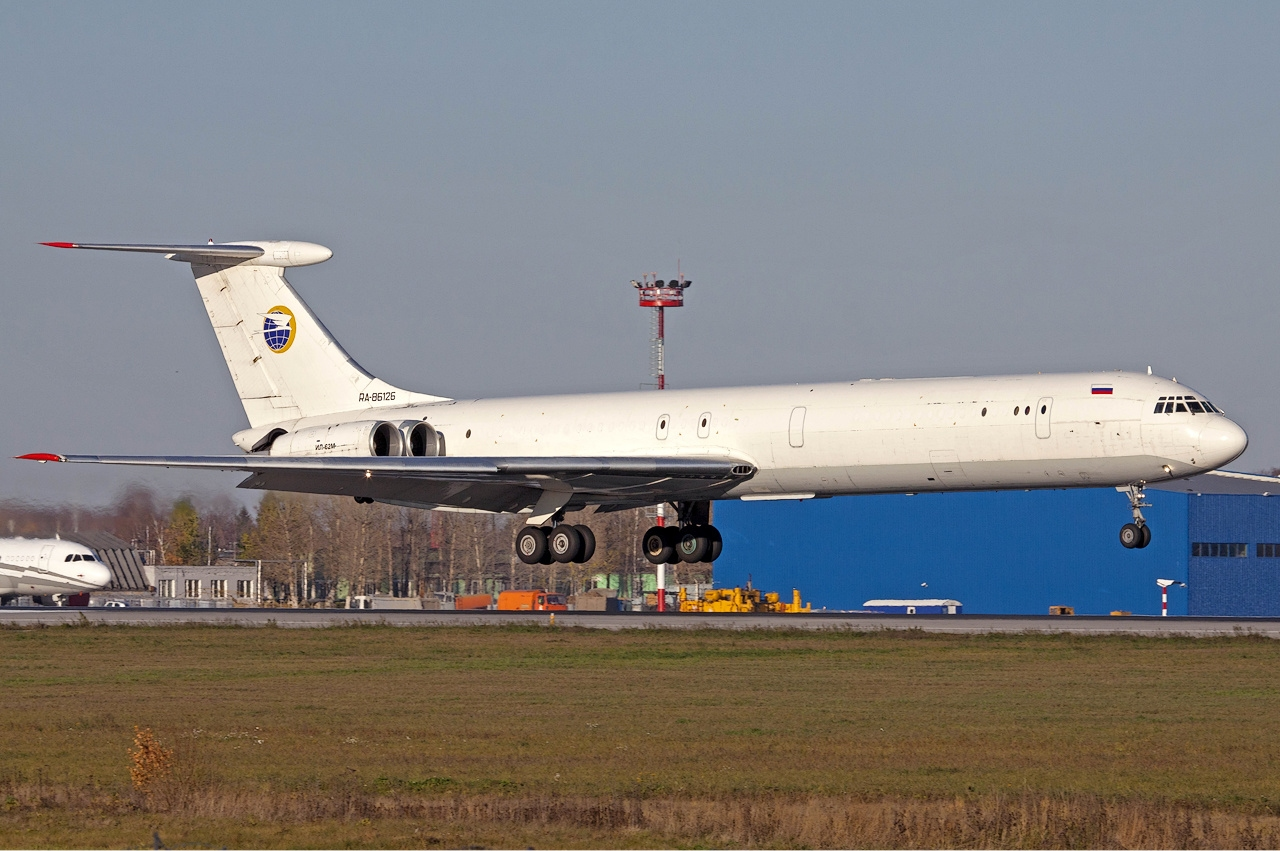
IATA	ICAO	Call sign
G7	KAO	KAZAVIA
- Founded: 2001
- Ceased operations: 2015
- Hubs: Moscow, Kazan
- Destinations: Cargo/Charter
- Parent company: Kazan Aircraft Production Association
- Headquarters: Plekhanov, Tyumen
- Key people: A.A.Bulkin (General Manager/Director)
- Website: http://www.kapoavia.ru

KAPO Avia was a large global cargo airline with its main base in Moscow (DME) and a secondary base in Kazan. It operated a fleet of ex-passenger (converted) Ilyushin Il-62M aircraft with a maintenance base capable of maintaining both the Il-62 and the Tupolev Tu-214. KAPO was one of the top ten largest freight carriers in Russia and was owned by the Kazan Aircraft Production Association who manufacture and/or maintain the Tupolev Tu-214, Tupolev Tu-334 and Ilyushin Il-62.

== Destinations ==
Belarus

- Minsk

China

- Shanghai
- Shijiazhuang
- Tianjin
- Ürümqi

Egypt

- Cairo

Estonia

- Tallinn

Hungary

- Budapest

India

- Delhi

Iraq

- Baghdad

Kazakhstan

- Karaganda

Lithuania

- Kaunas

Moldova

- Chișinău

Russia

- Anadyr
- Kazan
- Khabarovsk
- Krasnoyarsk
- Magadan
- Moscow
- Norilsk
- Novosibirsk
- Petropavlovsk-Kamchatsky
- Saint Petersburg
- Yakutsk
- Yuzhno-Sakhalinsk

Turkey

- Istanbul

Ukraine

- Dnipro

United Arab Emirates

- Dubai
- Sharjah

== Fleet ==
Aircraft type	Active	Notes
Ilyushin Il-62M	3	Cargo version
Antonov An-26	1	
