= Aria Air =

Iranian airline

Aria Air هواپیمایی آریا
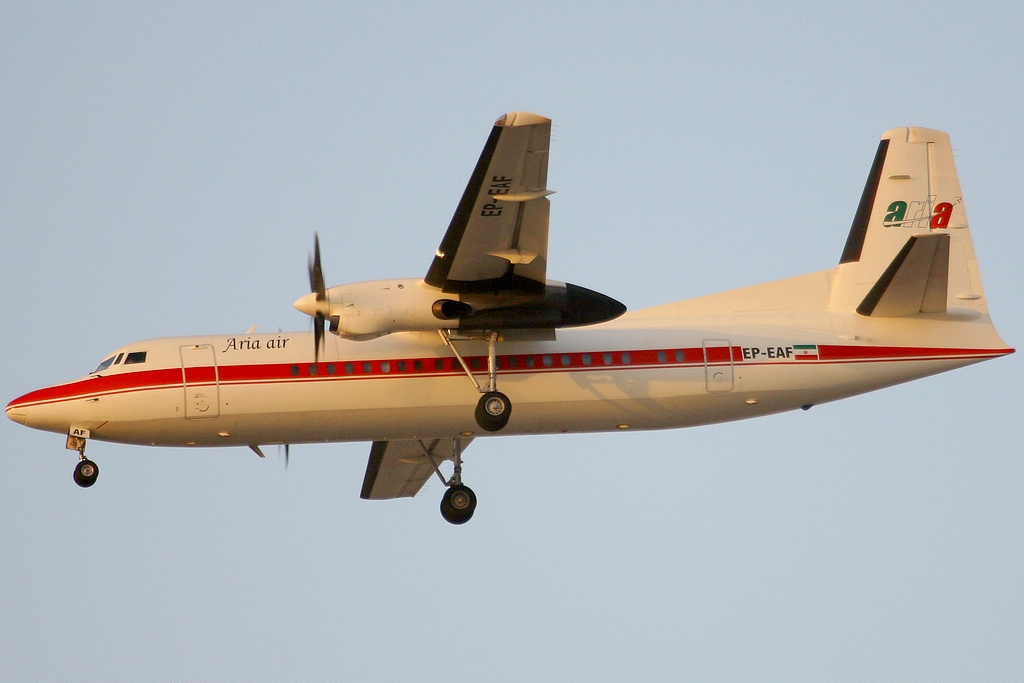
- A Fokker 50 of Aria Air
IATA	ICAO	Call sign
-	IRX	ARIA
- Founded: 1999; 27 years ago
- Ceased operations: July 24, 2009
- Operating bases: Bandar Abbas, Iran
- Fleet size: 2
- Destinations: 11
- Headquarters: Tehran, Iran
- Key people: Captain Mehdi Dadpay, Seyfallah Moradi & Mohammad Hossein Alavi
- Website: web.archive.org/*/http://www.ariaairline.ir

Aria Air (Persian: هواپیمایی آریا, Havâpeymâyi-ye Âriyâ) was an airline based in Bandar Abbas, Iran. It operated international and domestic passenger service. Officially, its main base was in Bandar Abbas, but the headquarter was located in Tehran.

== History ==
The airline was established and started operations in 1999 as Aria Air Tour. In 2001 the airline was renamed to Aria Air. With a fleet of leased Yakovlev's and Tupolevs the airline had added it's route to Dubai. In 2004 two Fokker 50s were added to the Aria Air fleet. In 2009 following a fatal accident the airline ceased all operations on the exact same day.

== Fleet ==
The Aria Air fleet consisted of the following aircraft (as of January 2013):

- 2 Fokker 50

As of July 2014 Iran banned the use of aircraft over twenty years old, so both machines were grounded.

== Destinations ==
Iran

- Kish
- Bandar Abbas
- Mashhad
- Ahvaz
- Bushehr
- Shiraz
- Lar

United Arab Emirates

- Dubai
- Sharjah

Syria

- Damascus

Tajikistan

- Dushanbe

== Incidents ==
- On 13 November 2000, an Aria Air Yakovlev aircraft was hijacked.
- On 24 July 2009, Aria Air Flight 1525 an Ilyushin IL-62M, registered UP-I6208, crashed on landing at Mashhad International Airport, Mashhad, Iran, killing 16 people including the CEO Mehdi Dadpay. 136 of the passengers escaped any harm, but 19 of them were injured.
