= Ilyushin Il-62 =

Soviet long-range narrow-body four-engined jet airliner

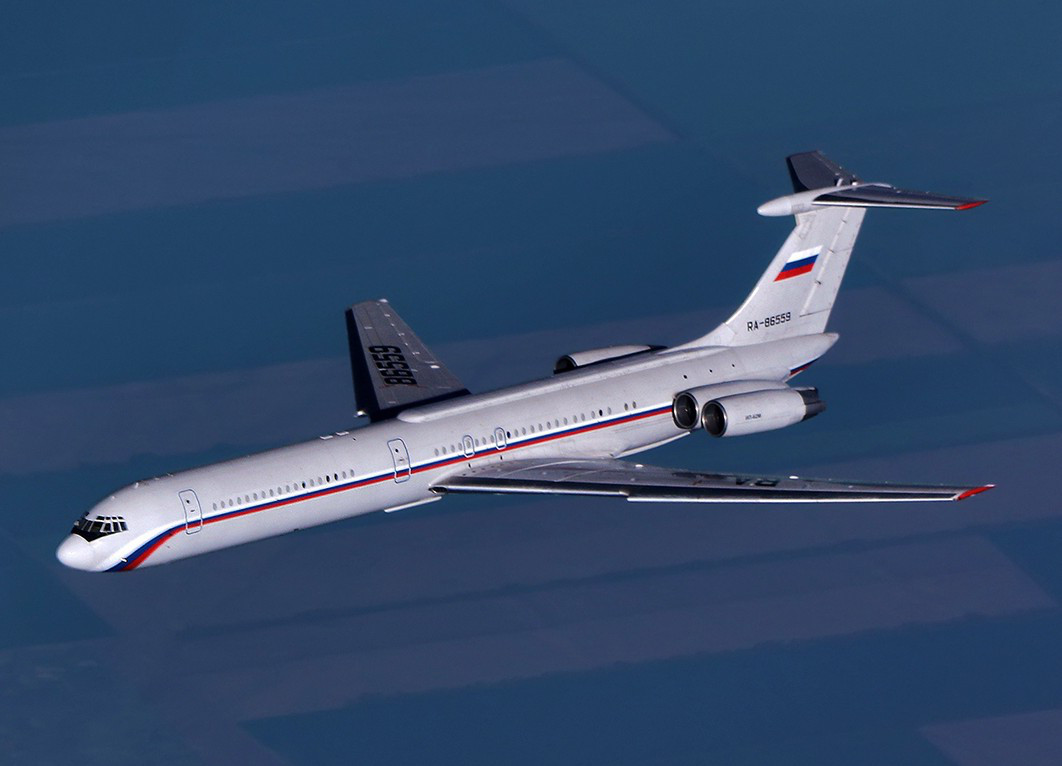
- A Russian Air Force Ilyushin Il-62M

General information
- Type: Narrow-body jet airliner
- Designer: Ilyushin
- Built by: KAPO
- Status: In limited service
- Primary users: Russian Air Force Air Koryo; Rada Airlines; Aeroflot (historical)
- Number built: 292 (5 prototypes; 94 Il-62; 193 Il-62M)

History
- Manufactured: 1963–1995
- Introduction date: Il-62 – 15 September 1967; Il-62M – 9 March 1974
- First flight: 3 January 1963

The Ilyushin Il-62 (Russian: Илью́шин Ил-62; NATO reporting name: Classic) is a Soviet long-range narrow-body jetliner conceived in 1960 by Ilyushin. As a successor to the popular turboprop Il-18 and with capacity for almost 200 passengers and crew, the Il-62 was the world's largest jet airliner when first flown in 1963. The seventh four engined, long-range jet airliner to fly (the predecessors being the De Havilland Comet (1949), Avro Jetliner (1949), Boeing 707 (1954), Douglas DC-8 (1958), Vickers VC10 (1962), and experimental Tupolev Tu-110 (1957), it was the first such type to be operated by the Soviet Union and a number of allied nations.

The Il-62 entered Aeroflot civilian service on 15 September 1967 with an inaugural passenger flight from Moscow to Montreal and remained the standard long-range airliner for the Soviet Union (and later, Russia) for several decades. It was the first Soviet pressurised aircraft with non-circular cross-section fuselage and ergonomic passenger doors and the first Soviet jet with six-abreast seating (the turboprop Tu-114 shared this arrangement) and international-standard position lights.

Over 30 nations operated the Il-62 with over 80 examples exported and others having been leased by Soviet-sphere and several Western airlines. The Il-62M variant became the longest-serving model in its airliner class (average age of examples in service as of 2016 is over 32 years). Special VIP (salon) and other conversions were also developed and used as head-of-state transport by some 14 countries. However, because it is expensive to operate compared to newer generation airliners, the number in service was greatly reduced after the 2008 Great Recession. The Il-62's successors include the wide-bodied Il-86 and Il-96, both of which were made in much smaller numbers and neither of which was widely exported.

== Development ==
The Ilyushin OKB presented a proposal for a four-engined long-range jet airliner in February 1960, receiving the go-ahead from the Soviet Council of Ministers on 18 June 1960, with the Kuznetsov Design Bureau being instructed at the same time to develop the NK-8 turbofan to power the new airliner. The official specification required that the airliner, designated Il-62, must carry 165 economy-class passengers over a distance of 4,500 km (2,800 mi) or 100 first-class passengers over 6,700 km (4,200 mi).

The Il-62 replaced the fast turboprop Tu-114 on long-range routes. As the Tu-114 was just entering service when the Il-62 was on the drawing board, Ilyushin had time for an unhurried design, test, and development programme. This was useful, since the Il-62 did call for significant development.

The Il-62 and the British Vickers VC10 are the only commercial airliners with four engines fitted in twinned/paired nacelles by the sides of, and beneath, a T-shaped empennage (T-tail). In the case of Ilyushin, the configuration was dictated by TsAGI, the Soviet Union's aerospace agency, since Ilyushin's design bureau lacked the resources to engage in configuration studies. This layout allowed the wing design to be optimised for aerodynamic efficiency, without being cluttered by having to carry engines. In addition, the rear-mounted engines reduced engine noise in the cabin and allowed smaller vertical tail surfaces (as the yawing moment in the event of an engine failure was reduced compared to wing-mounted engines). These advantages are balanced by a number of drawbacks. The wing structure, lacking the weight of forward engines to pull down against the wing torsional moment, needed to be heavier, as did the rear fuselage structure, which had to carry the engines. In addition, aerodynamic wash (shadow) from the wing blankets the tail when the nose is pitched up (high angle of attack) leading the aircraft into a condition known as deep stall. This called for complex and (in the 1960s) unreliable automatic stall warning systems such as stick shakers and stick pushers to prevent the aircraft from stalling, although the Il-62's wing was designed to prevent deep stall.

Early aircraft (prototypes, pre-production and initial production aircraft) display an evolution from thin or thick kinked leading inboard edges to the ultimate thick and straight 1966 shape. The characteristic "dog-tooth" also moved until fixed before production began. The engine installation also evolved, with the engines' longitudinal axes canted by 3 degrees from the horizontal, addition of thrust reversers to the outer engines, and slimming down of the entire installation as production began.

The prototype was grossly underpowered, as its intended NK-8 engines were not ready, and small Lyulka AL-7 turbojet engines had to be installed temporarily. The prototype with AL-7PB engines (registered СССР-06156) first flew on 3 January 1963, but crashed after clipping a perimeter fence during a maximum-weight testing flight of the development program. The production Il-62 was powered by the originally intended rear-mounted Kuznetsov NK-8-4 engines. The first Il-62 powered with NK-8 engines (registered СССР-06153) first flew in 1964.

The Il-62M variant (first flight in 1971, introduced in 1973) has more powerful, more efficient, and quieter Soloviev D-30KU engines and a fin fuel tank. Beneath the skin, the Il-62M has simpler and lighter single-slotted flaps and incremental aerodynamic improvements. Most important of these was the addition of spoilerons (spoilers or wing-mounted lift-disruptors which can act in the same capacity as ailerons by differential deployment in cruising flight, or in concert to kill lift on landing), and the ability to use idle reverse thrust in flight during the final approach so as to shorten the landing run. All but one example in service today are Il-62M. In 1978, the Il-62MK was further developed to seat up to 198 passengers and carry about 2 tonnes (4,400 lb) more payload or fuel than the Il-62M.

Other versions were also planned, including a stretched version to seat up to 250 passengers and a shrunk version to suit smaller airfields.

The Il-62 has tricycle landing gear with an additional lightweight gear strut at the rear of the fuselage which extends when the aircraft reaches its parking position. Aircraft with rear-mounted engines are usually tail-heavy when sitting empty on the ground, and to prevent the aircraft from tipping up on its tail, various devices are used for supporting the tail – from simple "pogo stick" fixed struts on small aircraft to light-weight extendable struts (Il-62). Aircraft like DC-9 or Boeing 727 use an airstair door under their tail, which serves the dual purpose of a tail support and an extra door for passenger loading.

The Il-62 is the only airliner in its class with unpowered, all-manual flight controls, using steel cables, rods, pulleys, aerodynamic and weight balances, and aerodynamic trim tabs. The Il-62 also has a forward-mounted tank serving as a water ballast. This may be used when the aircraft flies empty or lightly loaded. If this is a fact, it would rank the Il-62 alongside other airliners that use ballast, notably the French Caravelle and the Soviet Tu-154. Due to the rear-mounted powerplants, the wings are aerodynamically clean, and takeoff and landing aids are employed without the disturbing effect of engine nacelles, resulting in free airflow over the dorsal wing surface. This allows the aircraft to fly through air turbulence of 16–18 m/s without affecting its stability.

Another key Il-62 trademark is the "saw tooth" ("dog-tooth") on the wing leading edge. This prominent feature acts as an aerodynamic fence vortex generator (without which the wings would be almost vortex-free), and fixed leading-edge droop/slat/flap. It ensures vice-free behaviour at high angles of attack and assists efficient long-range cruise. The saw tooth removes the need for hydraulic controls, stick shakers, and stick pushers. Later models of the VC10 (for British United Airways and Ghana Airways) also adopted this feature, in their case closer to the wing tips.

Early NK-8-4-engined Il-62s suffered from performance problems, including fatigue and overheating issues with the engines, sometimes leading to false fire alarms, which could possibly cause the crew to accidentally shut down paired engines to prevent contiguous engine and fuselage damage. Flying with only two paired engines on the same side would, however, render the aircraft unbalanced and difficult to control. Subsequent modifications to the Il-62 and the VC10 (which had a similar engine arrangement) largely rectified this problem. There were two fatal Il-62 losses involving engine failure, both occurring with aircraft owned by LOT Polish Airlines, which had also leased a number of Il-62s from Aeroflot and Tarom. The higher-fatality accident (183) was a fully laden Il-62M Flight 5055 on 9 May 1987, which experienced a rear fuselage fire that possibly went unnoticed by the crew, hence their decision not to land at one of two nearby airports. Control of the plane was eventually lost on the return flight to Warsaw, most likely due to one of the auxiliary fuel tanks fitted to some LOT Il-62s having ignited. The other was an unmodified (early version) NK-8-4-powered Il-62 Flight 007, which crashed on 14 March 1980 with 87 fatalities after being fitted with an engine that had previously caused vibration problems when used on two other LOT aircraft (the investigation suggested that the turbine disc was damaged before its final installation).

Powerplant failure of the type that afflicted the LOT aircraft was extremely rare because bearing wear is generally identified by vibration tests during maintenance. At the time, however, LOT did not have equipment to test or fault-diagnose engines of the size used in the Il-62. Unfortunately this meant that any potential problem might not be identified between overhauls. There were other known instances of engine failure, but these did not result in loss of control. The LOT accidents involving different engine types (but same engine position) was a fatal crash-rate 30 times higher than the Il-62 average (2.8% vs 0.092%). At least one other LOT Soloviev D-30-equipped aircraft (Tu-154) also suffered a similar engine failure (non-fatal) around this time. After 1987, LOT introduced turbine vibration-detecting equipment and shortened the time between inspections. It also adopted the dual flight control system used on some other Il-62s and deleted the auxiliary engine-pod fuel tanks. These planes were subsequently sold to Air Ukraine in 1991/1992, which operated them until the airline closed in 2000. In 2010, 30 years after the loss of Flight 007, an investigation of previously unreleased archives at Instytut Pamięci Narodowej revealed that during the industrial unrest of the 1980s LOT had been instructed by the Polska Rzeczpospolita Ludowa authorities to effect operational cost savings by over-exploitation of service life of its jet engines (see LOT Flight 007 § Causes of disaster).

=== Special Il-62 conversions ===
Several special conversions were made to the basic Il-62, the main ones being the Il-62 and Il-62M salon VIP versions used by heads of state, and the Il-62M airborne command aircraft (just one example) used by the Russian government. Although the Il-62 had been introduced during Khrushchev's time, it was during the Brezhnev era that Ilyushin was asked to develop the salon versions, which have been used by Russian leaders ever since right up to the Putin years (during which time both Il-62 and Il-96 aircraft were used in combination). The VIP examples were fitted with conference rooms and rest areas, rooms for the retinue, and service personnel and bodyguards, while the secure communication equipment enabled contact with Moscow and other cities from any part of the globe. Examples were also delivered to other countries, including Czechoslovakia, Germany, North Korea, Sudan and Ukraine.

An airborne command Il-62M (RA-86570) was customised for the emergency-response agency EMERCOM to provide evacuation transport for Russian citizens from foreign countries and act as airborne command post for these and other emergency situations. It operates in conjunction with at least one other Il-62M and a fleet of Il-76, Il-76TD waterbombers, An-72 and helicopters, which have operated in some 60 countries, and is credited with having saved 50,000 lives since the agency was created in 1994. Apart from basic interior changes, RA-86570 features hush-kitted engines and Honeywell electronics with global communication ability via satellite, and an Inmarsat system. The aircraft was used as a command post during the combat of forest fires in the Far East, when dealing with the Chechen terrorist attack in Kaspiysk when an apartment building was blown up, and to bring a Russian Deputy Foreign Minister to Sharjah in 1996 and from there, collecting the crew of an Il-76 freighter who had escaped from the Taliban militia in Afghanistan.

== Design ==
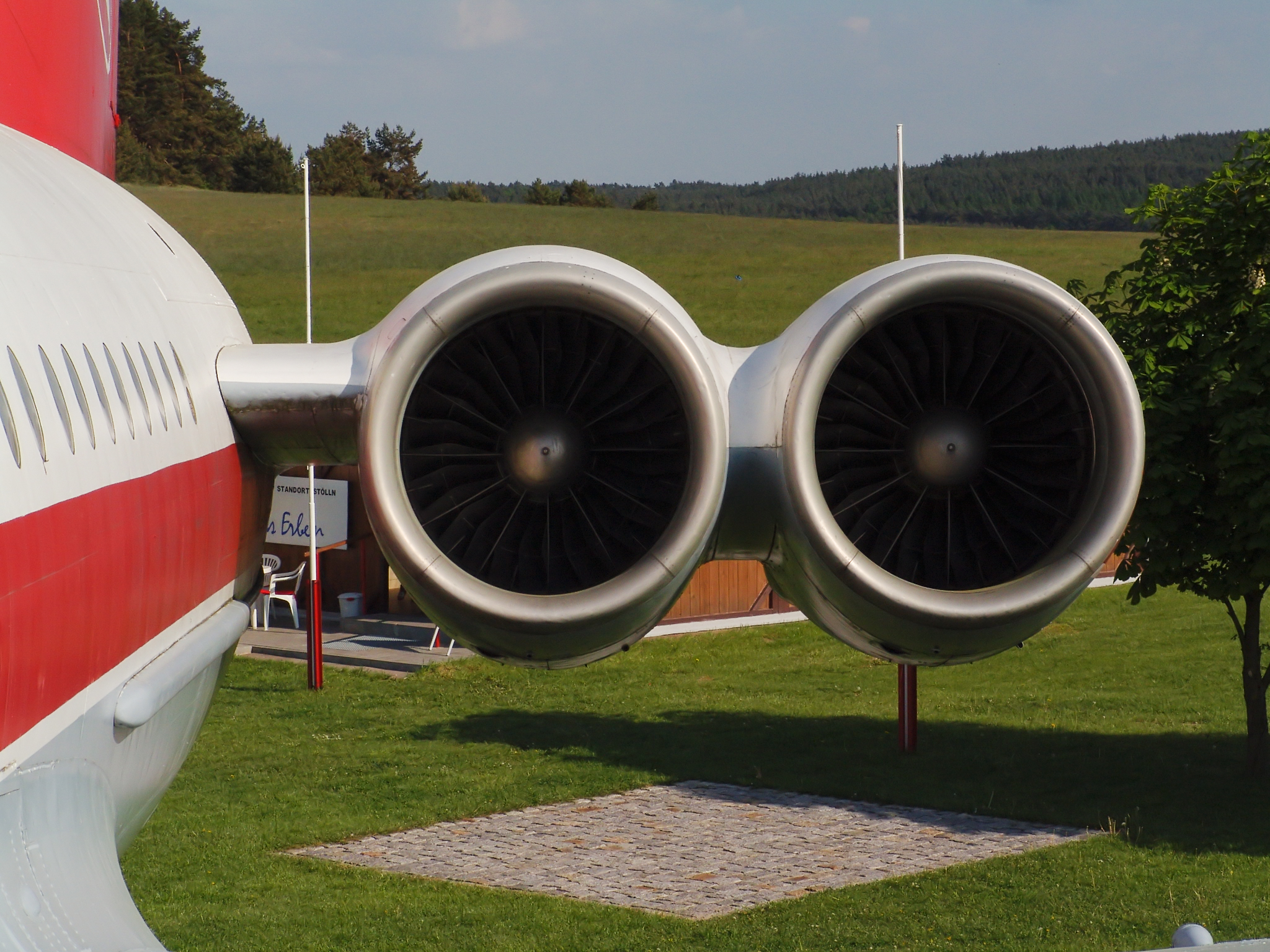
Example of the dual-engined nacelle located on opposing sides of the rear fuselage

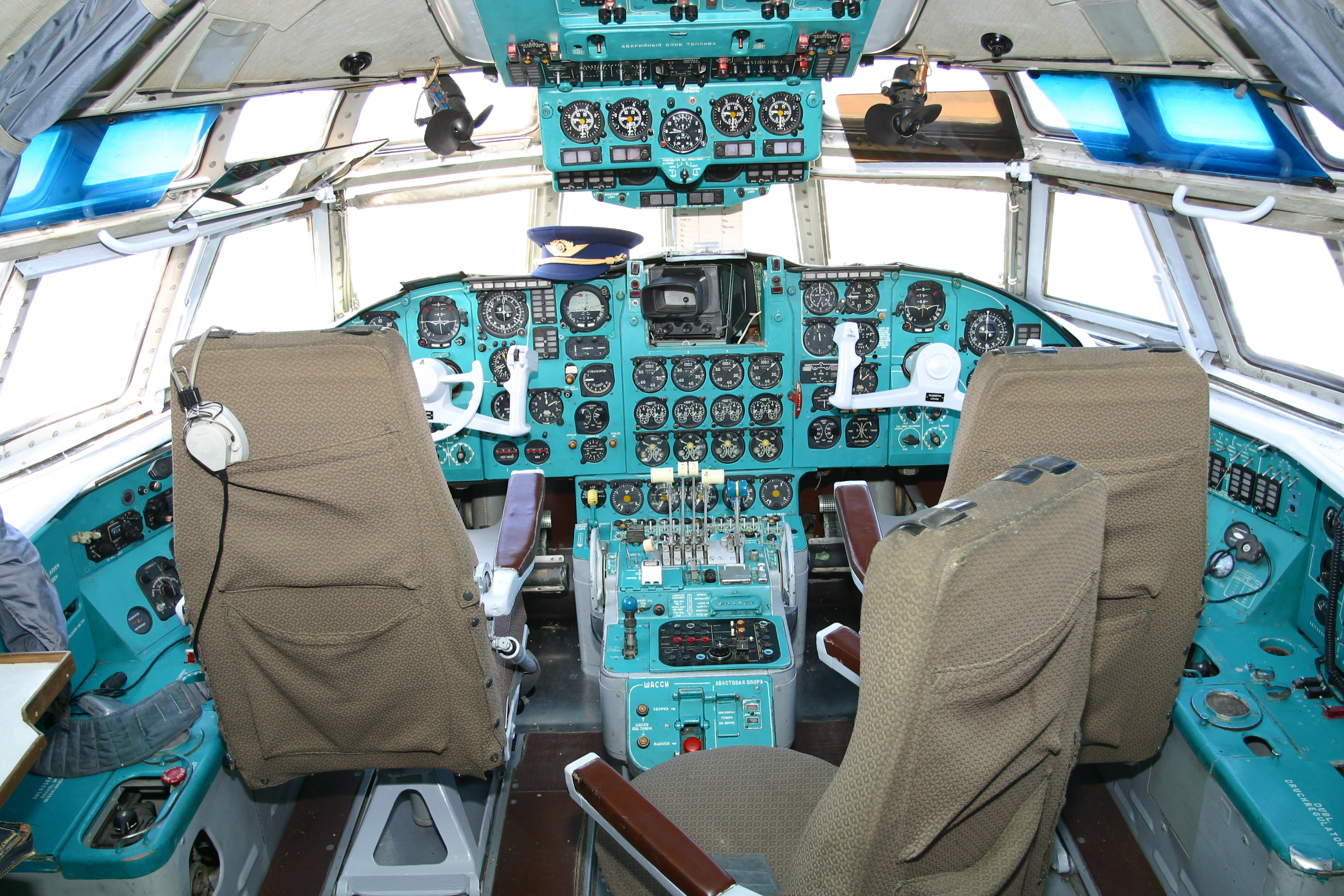
Cockpit

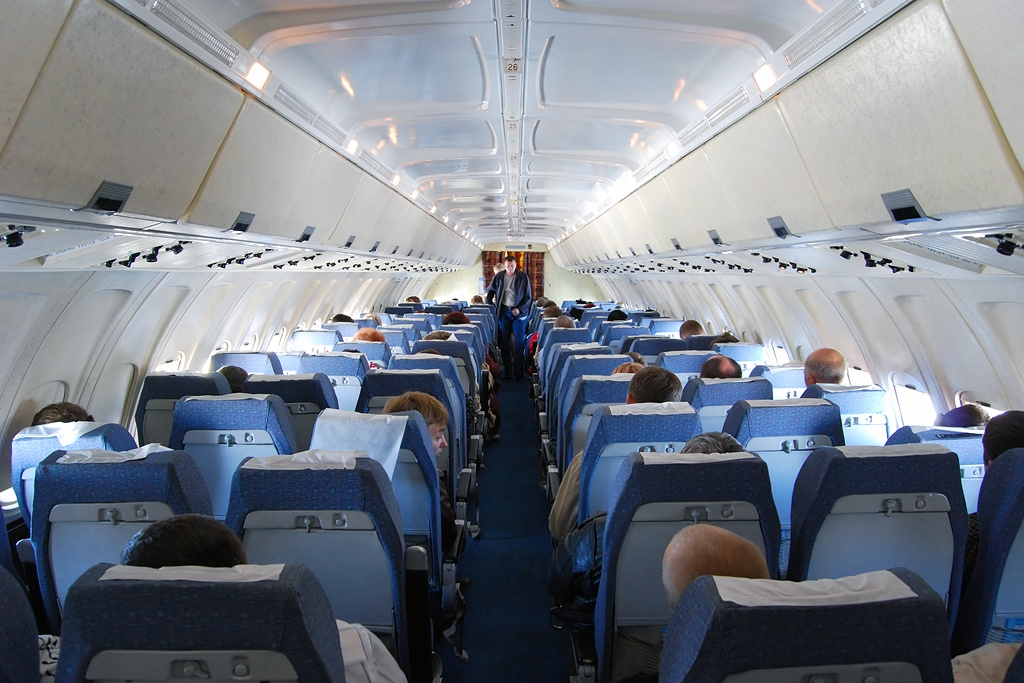
Six-abreast cabin

The Il-62 is a conventional all-metal low-wing monoplane of riveted sectional semi-monocoque construction to fail-safe design principles (a structure designed so that failure of one major member does not cause immediate failure of the whole). Its service life was initially set at 30,000 flight hours and subject to extensions and curtailments according to the quality of service procedures, inspection and manufacturer's bulletins. The aircraft features pressurised cabin and freight holds (with fuselage dimensions of 3.8 m width x 4.1 m height), duplex all-mechanical flight controls, though with twin electric motors for tailplane incidence control; hydraulic nosewheel steering, landing gear and tail strut actuation, and wheel brakes. The Il-62M has spoilers and lift dumpers which extend automatically upon landing and are hydraulically operated. Control surfaces include a variable-incidence tailplane with dynamically and weight-compensated elevators with trim tabs, triple-section tabbed ailerons (outermost for low speed and innermost for high speed) which are interlinked with a torsion bar, spoilerons (Il-62M), spoilers and lift dumpers, and pneumatically actuated thrust reversers on the two outboard engines (the reversers are flight-rated on the Il-62M).

27 V AC electrics are used throughout with a TA-6 auxiliary power unit (a turbine generator which supplies electric power and air conditioning on the ground) in the lower tailcone plus backup lead-zinc batteries.

The aircraft uses conventional hot air de-icing using engine bleed air. Its sea level is equivalent to 2,400 m (8,000 ft) above mean sea level and thereafter reducing to the equivalent of 2,400 m (8,000 ft) to cruise altitude. It was originally built with no automatic oxygen masks; emergency supply comprises hatrack-housed oxygen bottles and masks for manual distribution to passengers by cabin crew. Since 1997, most aircraft have been retrofitted with automatic oxygen supply systems with drop-down masks.

Its avionics include a Polyot-1 automatic flight control system (a "super autopilot," able to be programmed with a set route which it can fly without human intervention but under constant flight crew monitoring; ICAO Cat. 1 approaches standard, Cat. 2 optional), Doppler navigational radar replaced by triplex INSS (Inertial Navigation System Sets) on Il-62M after 1978 and by Satellite navigation sets on many aircraft after 1991, triple VHF and HF flightdeck radios, automatic direction finders, Soviet and Western instrument landing system receivers, vertical omnidirectional radio range and radio beacon receivers, duplex radio altimeters, automatic radio transponders, a full ICAO-standard navigation lights fit, cabin public address and intercom systems. Soviet/Russian and Warsaw Pact sovereign examples are additionally fitted with triplex "Odd Rods" (NATO code name) IFF (identification friend or foe) air defence transponders identifiable by three closely spaced short aerials.

Emergency evacuation systems include inflatable life rafts and manually extendable canvas evacuation slides. Most aircraft are now retrospectively fitted with emergency floor lighting strips and some aircraft equipped with automatically inflatable evacuation slides. Fire extinguishers are sited in engine nacelles, flight deck compartment, cabin crew rest areas and toilets.

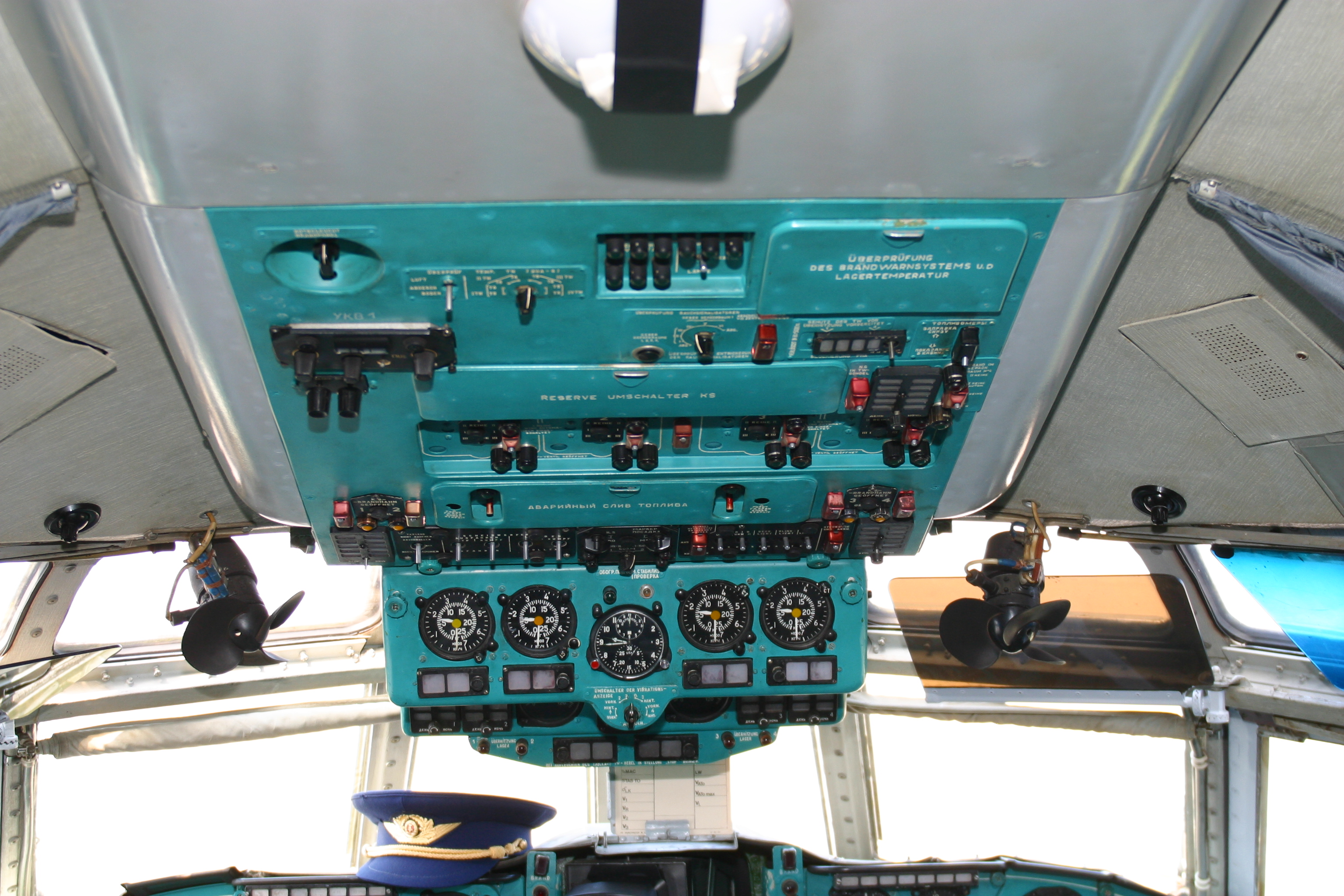
Overhead panel.

The Il-62 offers accommodation for up to 198 passengers in a single-class layout, seated six-abreast at 84 cm (33 in) seat pitch in two cabins separated by a vestibule, galley/pantry and cabin crew rest area. There are three toilets, forward, midships, and aft. It has a buffet/bar and a further cabin crew rest area in a vestibule forward, with a further optional cabin crew rest area aft. Typical mixed-class accommodation ranges between 128 and 144, seated four or six abreast, and a common single aisle configuration for long distance Aeroflot examples was first class (2-abreast) 3 rows, business class (3-abreast) 4 rows, economy class (3-abreast) 17 rows (Thiel, 2001). In this configuration, the central aisle in business and economy classes is quite narrow. A first class compartment is optionally sited aft of forward entry door or just forward of midships entry door, with an economy compartment further forward in the latter case. "Skycot" fitments are located in hatracks, while later Il-62Ms (1978 onwards) feature enclosed hatracks. Customer-optionable interior fitments. No in-flight entertainment systems are available except a public-address system that may be coupled to an open-reel or audio cassette player. Individual aircraft were experimentally fitted with television sets for Soviet-standard videotape entertainment during the 1970s. Some aircraft were retrospectively fitted with Western in-flight entertainment (solely audio) systems after 1991.

=== Similarities to VC10 ===
A sideline to the Il-62 story concerns alleged industrial espionage. As the Il-62 was developed at about the same time as the VC10, to which it bears a marked external resemblance, British Cold War commentators implied that the VC10 design may have been copied by dubbing the Il-62 the "VC10-ski.", but no evidence of this was ever presented. There are significant differences between the Il-62 and the VC10, as the Soviet type is larger, lifts a greater load, and is designed for use exclusively at developed airports whereas the British type can adapt to "up-country" bases. Unlike the VC10, the Il-62 uses conservative technology, such as mechanical control surface linkages, and is an entirely civilian machine, whereas the VC10 was designed to serve as both a civilian airliner and military airlifter and freighter. The Il-62 found more buyers and was built in much larger numbers than the VC10 (292 vs 54), and as of November 2018 many examples are still in service. On the other hand, the VC10 has been retired from that role (in 1966 BOAC described the aircraft as uneconomic and asked for government subsidies to continue operating it, although some VC10s were used by Britain's Royal Air Force in support roles). China and Czechoslovakia were two countries that cancelled orders for the VC10 (for CAAC and Czechoslovak Airlines, respectively) and purchased the Il-62 instead.

== Operational history ==
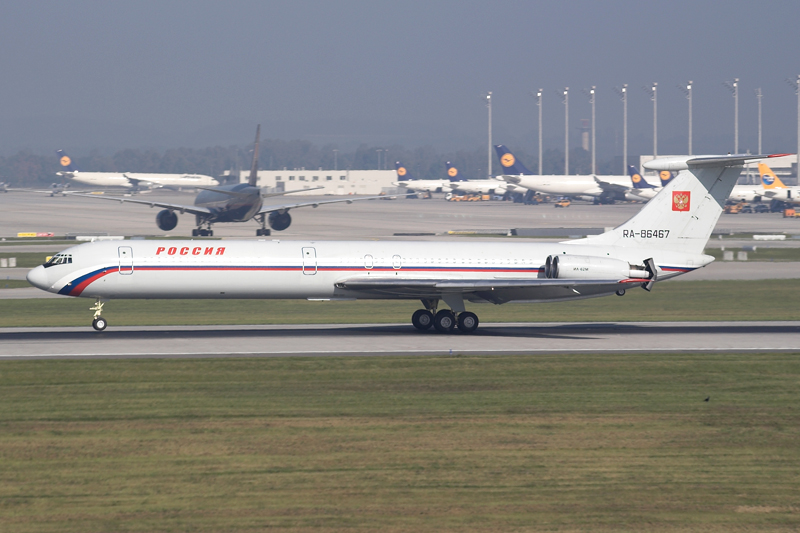
Rossiya Il-62M at Munich Airport in 2006

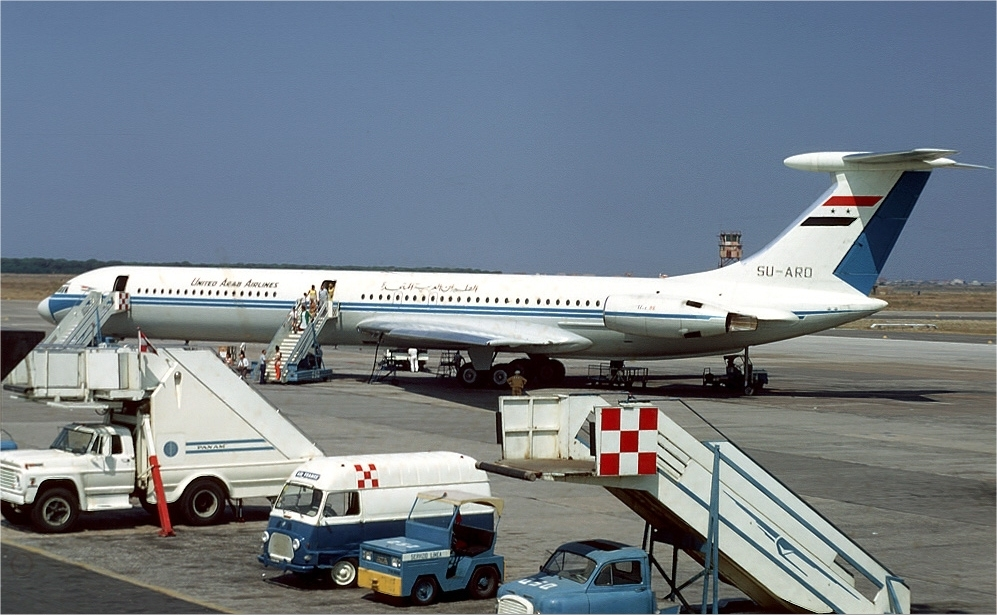
Il-62 of United Arab Airlines in Rome in 1971

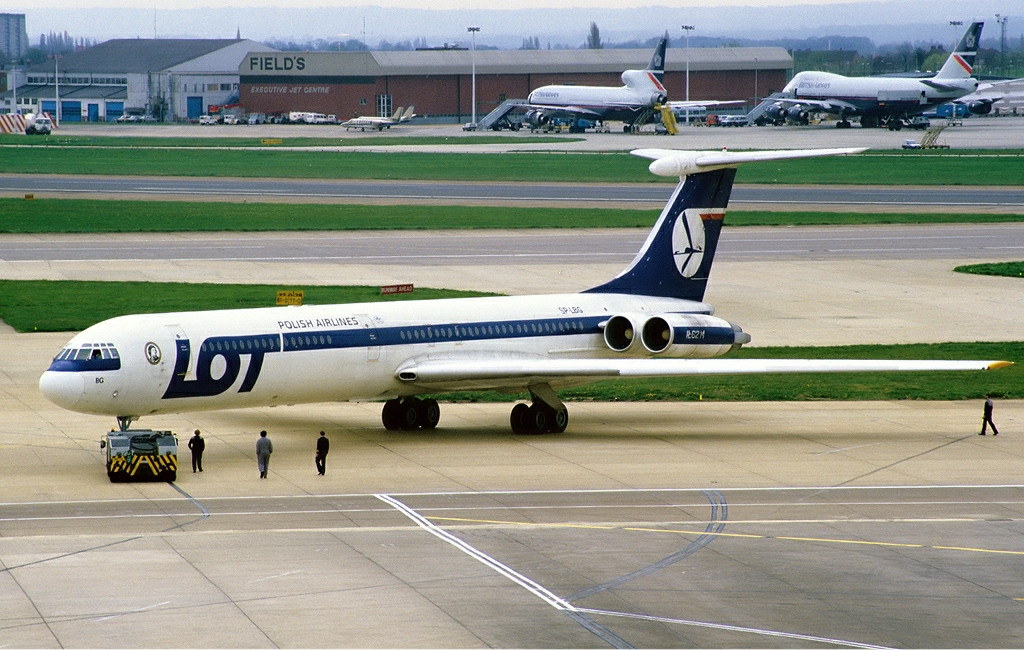
Il-62M of LOT Polish Airlines in 1987, 3 weeks before it crashed

After the introduction of the Il-62M, Aeroflot (the largest operator of the plane) gradually upgraded and later replaced its fleet of NK-8 powered Il-62s with the newer Soloviev D-30 KU-powered Il-62M. Coupled with engine nacelle and other modifications, greatly reduced the chance of contiguous powerplant damage. By mid-1973, the airline was operating 60 Il-62s, and by 1989 this had increased to 165 (Il-62 and Il-62M). The Il-62M had a dispatch rate with Aeroflot of 97% with some examples logging as many as 17 flight hrs/day, and it was described as the most reliable type in the fleet at that time. It set several international records in its class, mostly exemplifying a range capability far in excess of the conservative Aeroflot calculations applied in Soviet times. Some of these records were set by an all-woman crew of five captained by Iraida ("Inna") Vertiprakhova. With 10 tonnes of freight, the Il-62M had a maximum range of 10,300 km compared to 9,412 km for the VC10 carrying the same weight. With a 23 tonne payload, the Il-62M range was 8000 km, compared to 6,920 km for a Boeing 707 with maximum payload. Because of its capacity, the plane has historically been used for emergency civilian evacuation flights, one of the most notable being the landing of an Aeroflot-registered Il-62 at Santiago Airport, Chile on the night of 10 September 1973 (the day before the military coup by Augusto Pinochet) in order to evacuate 147 Cuban embassy personnel. In April 2015 two EMERCOM Il-62Ms (including RA-86495 of the Russian Federation Air Force) were used to evacuate around 900 foreign nationals and Yemenis from Sanaa during the Saudi-led military operation against Yemen.

The Il-62 was said to be well regarded by pilots and passengers alike, especially for its strong directional stability in high turbulence (although landings are sometimes bouncy), smooth cruising ability and very quiet interior in cruise mode due partly to engine placement. Although the original Il-62 was rated for a service life of 23 years and was criticised for heavy fuel consumption, upgraded M versions are sometimes rated for 50 years and have greatly improved operational economics. One of the drawbacks of the original Il-62 design was the lack of a cargo bay roller transfer system, which necessitated manual loading of pre-packaged baggage and cargo thus making preparation of the aircraft rather slow (a cargo/baggage conveyance system is standard on the Il-62M). There is relatively easy access to all serviceable mechanical components including the engines whilst the plane's thrust reversal capabilities allows reverse taxiing without the need for tow vehicles. Powerplant overhaul intervals varied between specifications and maintenance procedures and between the thrust reverse-capable outer engines and the inner ones. Czech Airlines operated an early Il-62 on a proving basis up to 3000 hrs between overhauls, which was well beyond the recommended (and their usual) intervals which were nearer 2000 hrs although Interflug were able to designate up to 5000 hrs with their service facilities. Subsequent upgrades to some Il-62Ms provided for 6000 hr overhaul intervals (with total engine life of 18,000–20,000 hrs). Later examples of the Il-62M remain in regular commercial service (as of 2016), and the type also sees continued use as a VIP/head of state transport.

Although the plane's safety record does not equal that of later airliners, there were no fatal accidents involving an Il-62 between 1989 and 2009 during which time the highest number of planes were in service. Several Il-62/M accidents over the first decades of operation mainly involved runway overruns or aborted takeoffs. The braking system employed the reverse thrust of the outer engines only, and if for some reason one or other failed to engage, the aircraft could become difficult to steer for an unprepared pilot. In seven takeoff or landing accidents there were no fatalities, a testament to the high level of structural integrity, and in two cases with landing-related fatalities [CCCP-86470 and UP-16208] these were due to the aircraft colliding with structures near the runway [tower and concrete wall, respectively]. The Il-62/M fuselage features a strengthened hull with 'ski' keel originally designed to allow for an undercarriage-up emergency landing (in practice the undercarriage and landing gear proved extremely reliable). The trade-off for the reinforced airframe is the relatively high fuel consumption and some airlines such as Interflug modified their planes to reduce fuel consumption.

Production is said to have continued until 1995, although continuous production ended in 1993. Including prototypes, total production is surmised as being 289. However, the factory states 292 (5 prototypes, 94 Il-62s and 193 Il-62Ms).

Four aircraft remained unsold at the factory as of 1997, while the last delivery was reportedly RA-86586 of Magma, built in 1995, but only delivered in 1999 as a result of tariffs imposed on imported western aircraft. The last airframe was built in 2004 for the Sudanese government.

During the Syrian Civil War, Russian Aerospace Forces Il-62M were observed flying between Russia and Syria. Starting at the end of 2015, with the Russian military intervention in the Syrian Civil War, Russian Aerospace Forces Il-62M were frequently reported departing and landing at the Khmeimim Air Base in Latakia, Syria, moving materiel and personnel in and out of Syria.

== Variants ==
Il-62
Initial production version, powered by four 23,150-lb (103.0 kN) Kuznetsov NK-8 turbofan engines, accommodation for a crew of five and 174 passengers.
Il-62M
Improved version, powered by four 24,250-lb (107.9 kN) Soloviev D-30KU turbofan engines, accommodation for a crew of five and 186 passengers, equipped with containerised baggage and freight system, modified wing spoilers and a revised flight deck, plus increased fuel capacity.
Il-62MK
Medium-range version, powered by four 24,250-lb (107.9 kN) Soloviev D-30KU turbofan engines, accommodation for a crew of five and 195 passengers, equipped with strengthened wings and landing gear for operations at higher gross weights.
Il-62MGr (or Il-62MF)
A rare cargo variant of the Soviet-era Il-62M jet. It can carry up to 40,000 kg of cargo with a range of 5,500 km.

== Operators ==
=== Civil operators ===
At least three Ilyushin Il-62 aircraft are in service with North Korea's Air Koryo and Belarus' Rada Airlines as of November 11, 2024.

=== Operational history ===
Over 30 countries have operated the Il-62 since 1967, although exports did not begin until initial Aeroflot needs had been met (rapid replacement of Tu-114s on international services). First exports were in late 1969 to CSA Czechoslovak Airlines. The pattern was similar with the Il-62M, of which the first export (to Cubana) was delayed until 1977. Among Eastern Bloc nations, Bulgaria and Hungary did not operate the Il-62 series, although Hungary briefly leased one example pending Boeing 767 services in 1990. As a curiosity, Malév Hungarian Airlines was the first and only foreign airline to order the Il-62 according to the October 1967 issue of Flight International. In 1968 the new political trend called "New Economic Mechanism" introduced by the Hungarian Council of Ministers led to the deletion of the order, because of financing problems. This was due, among other more important reasons, to heavy anti-Ilyushin lobbying by Tupolev in the former country and to commercial considerations in both countries whose airlines preferred to concentrate on short and medium range routes, that was equal to the low demand for the long-haul service.

East Germany, Poland, USSR, Czechoslovakia and Cuba were among the largest foreign customers for the Il-62. The former East German airline Interflug owned 24 aircraft: 21 in civilian service and three for airforce and presidential use (later transferred to the united German airforce), including six Il-62s, 16 Il-62Ms and two rare Il-62MKs (after unification, seven Interflug Il-62s were on-sold to Uzbekistan which later also bought the three airforce examples). Czech Airlines (formerly Czechoslovak Airlines) operated 21 planes between 1969 and 1997, including 15 Il-62s and six Il-62Ms, of which 15 were registered under the famous CSA 'OK jet' designation, and six were leased from Aeroflot. Some of these planes were still operational in 2012. Cuba operated 27 different Il-62s, of which 12 were leased either from Aeroflot or Tarom (which operated three Il-62s and two Il-62Ms alongside its Boeing 707s) and 15 were owned by Cubana which became a long-term operator with its first Il-62M purchase in 1977. After 2000, Cubana refurbished its remaining planes for international routes, on which they operated until March 2011. LOT Polish Airlines operated 23 Il-62s and Il-62Ms, including aircraft leased from Aeroflot and Tarom. The largest non-state operator of the Il-62 was Russian-based Domodedovo Airlines which acquired 45 planes from Aeroflot (42 Il-62Ms and 3 Il-62s) that were used for domestic services including continuous operations on the world's longest internal route, Moscow to Petropavlovsk-Kamchatsky, a distance of 6,800 kilometres (4,200 mi).

From 1970, Air France and Japan Air Lines wet-leased a number of Aeroflot Il-62s for long-haul services, and from 1971, KLM Royal Dutch Airlines operated nine Aeroflot-registered Il-62s for the Moscow-Amsterdam route (these planes wore joint Aeroflot/KLM markings).

Due to strained relations between the Soviet Union and the US during the 1980s, in 1984 Aeroflot coordinated with Irish carrier Aer Lingus to use Shannon airport as a hub for connecting flights from Moscow and Leningrad to link with the Irish carrier's New York routes. Aeroflot was also granted rights to use Shannon for flights to Cuba and South America (Peru). From 1992 Irish tour operators contracted Aeroflot to carry tourists to the eastern US (Miami) and later to the Caribbean, Central America and Mexico, using Il-62Ms. On any given day, Shannon hosted up to eight Il-62s and Il-86s (in addition to Tu-154s and Tu-134s). By 1995/1996, Shannon was handling 2,400 Aeroflot transit flights carrying 250,000 passengers per annum (including government-registered Il-62Ms) with Aeroflot crews being housed near Shannon airport. By 1995, direct flights between Moscow and the US became possible and the use of Shannon as a hub declined. For its US west-coast air links (which began in 1991) Aeroflot Il-62s flew east to Anchorage from Moscow and several cities in the Russian Far East (Khabarovsk, Vladivostok, Magadan, and Yuzhno-Sakhalinsk), often continuing on to San Francisco. Trans-Pacific Il-62 flights between the Russian Far East and Anchorage continued until 2000.

Il-62M/MKs remained popular for civilian service in Russia up until the economic recession of 2008. In late 2008, Russian-operated planes were removed from scheduled passenger operations due to a severe economic crisis affecting major operators Interavia Airlines, Dalavia and Domodedovo Airlines. As a result, Rossiya became the largest operator, but it uses the Il-62 for government service only. By September 2009 a total of 38 Il-62s (all versions) remained in service worldwide (compared with 88 planes in service in 2006), only one of which was the original series aircraft operating with Russian Air Force while others were M or MK-series aircraft. In 2011 Cubana retired its last civilian examples 33 years after receiving its first Il-62. Some other airlines and governments also operate small numbers of the type. In 2013 DETA Air ceased operations of Il-62M.

=== Former operators ===
Angola

- TAAG Angola Airlines

China

- CAAC Airlines

Cuba

- Cubana

Czechoslovakia

- ČSA Czechoslovak Airlines
- Government of Czechoslovakia

East Germany

- Interflug

Egypt

- EgyptAir

France

- Air France (lessee)

Gambia

- New Millenium Air

Georgia

- Air Zena

Guyana

- Guyana Airways (the sole South American operator)

Hungary

- Malév Hungarian Airlines (Leased from CSA Czechoslovak Airlines just for two months for few flights between Hungary and Japan)

India

- Air India (lessee)

Iran

- Aria Air

Japan

- Japan Airlines (used with Aeroflot)

Kazakhstan

- Air Kazakhstan
- Air Kokshetau (Part of Air Kazakhstan Group)
- Air Trust
- DETA Air
- Kazakhstan Airlines

Libya

- Libyan Arab Airlines

Mozambique

- LAM

Democratic People's Republic of Korea

- Air Koryo (2 are retired since 2023 and 2 are still in service but operated by Government of North Korea)

Netherlands

- KLM (leased & used with Aeroflot)

Poland

- LOT Polish Airlines

Romania

- TAROM

Russia/Soviet Union

- Aeroflot
- Aviaenergo
- Bural
- Dalavia
- Domodedovo Airlines
- Interavia Airlines
- KAPO Avia
- KrasAir
- Mavial Magadan Airlines
- Rossiya
- Russian Sky Airlines
- SAT Airlines
- VIM Airlines

Turkey

- Greenair

Uzbekistan

- Uzbekistan Airways

Ukraine

- Air Ukraine
- Ukraine Air Enterprise

Zaire

- Pride African International

=== Government/military operators ===
The aircraft has seen military use with the air force of East Germany (DDR [GDR]) and later the united Germany (one Il-62MK and two Il-62Ms) and is believed to have been operated by the air forces of other countries including Cuba, Gambia, Georgia, Libya, North Korea, Russia, Romania and Ukraine. It is used as an emergency response aircraft by the Russian government (RA-86570 and RA-86495). In addition to military use, it has been used as a personnel or head-of-state transport by Russia (at least eight examples), Ukraine, East Germany, Georgia (2748552), Uzbekistan (UK-86569), Gambia (C5-RTG), Mozambique, Sudan (ST-PRA), Cuba, North Korea, and Czechoslovakia, the government of which used an Il-62 (OK-BYV) and three Il-62Ms between 1974 and 1996. Some head-of-state examples were produced in VIP interior configuration whilst others were standard civilian versions.

In North Korea, two Il-62Ms (operated by Air Koryo) are owned by the North Korean government. Both have government liveries and VIP interior configurations and are given the call sign "Chammae" (national bird of North Korea). One is coded as "Chammae-1" which transports Kim Jong Un while the other, Chammae-2, provides transport to high level government officials and VIPs. Chammae-2 was seen transporting officials of the high-level DPRK delegation including Kim Yong Nam and Kim Yo Jong to Incheon International Airport in Seoul, South Korea for the 2018 Winter Olympics. Both aircraft are part of Air Koryo's inventory of four Il-62Ms.

=== Current operators ===
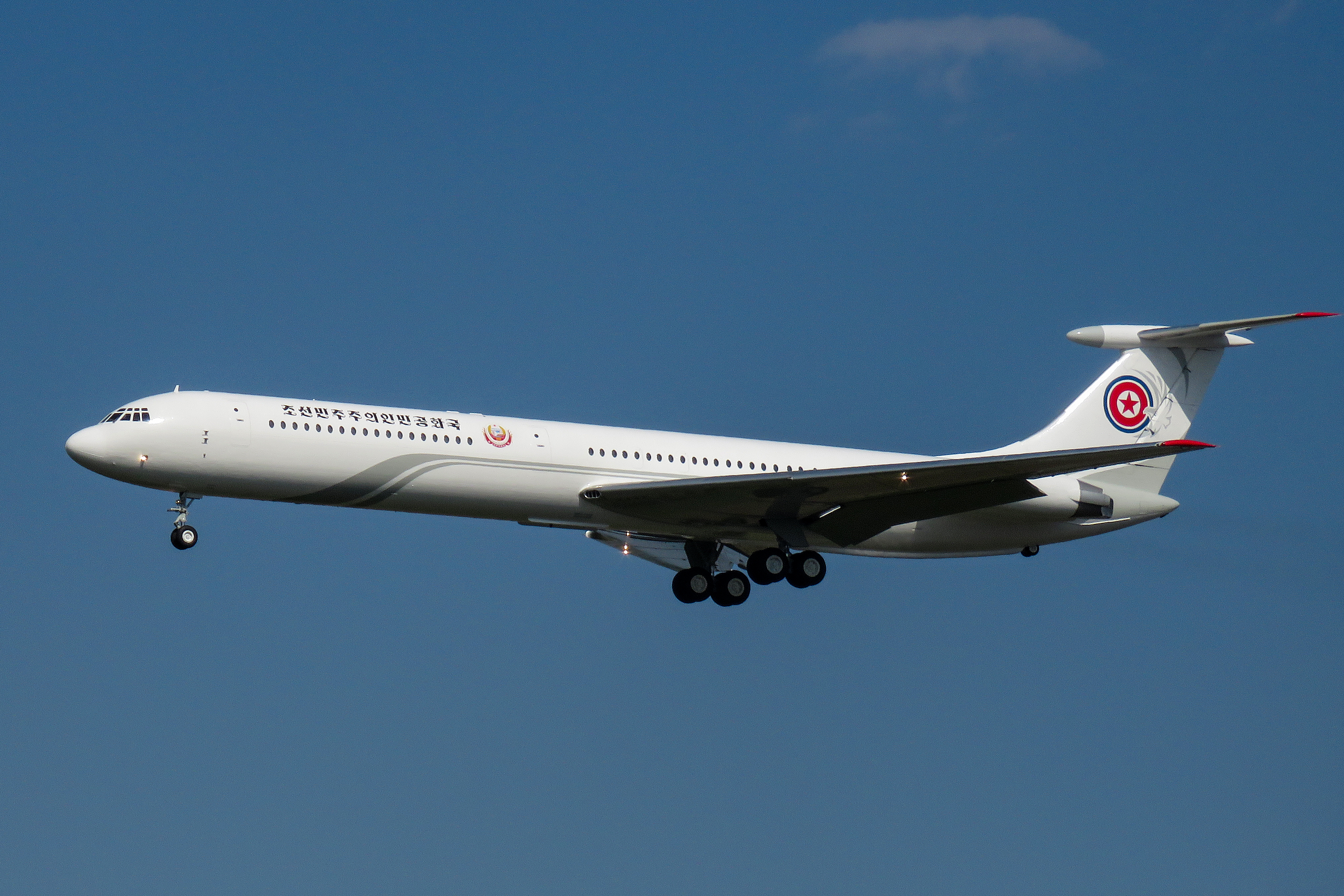
Ilyushin Il-62M of the Government of North Korea

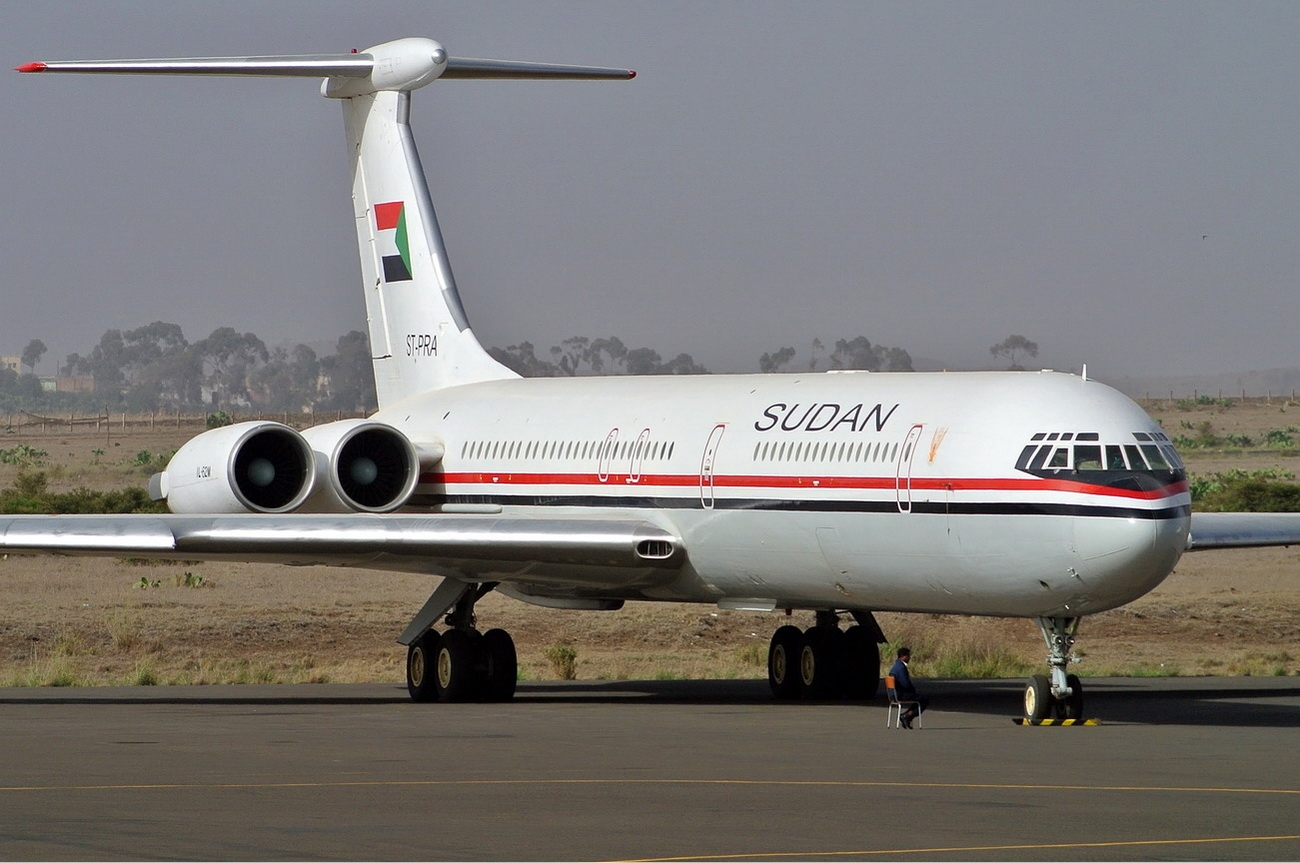
Ilyushin Il-62M operated by the Sudanese government

North Korea

- Government of North Korea – Currently owns 2 Il-62Ms (operated by Air Koryo)

Russia

- Russian Aerospace Forces

Belarus

- Rada Airlines – Currently owns 2 Il-62MGrs

=== Former operators ===
Cuba

- Cuban Air Force

Gambia

- Military of Gambia

East Germany

- Air Forces of the National People's Army

Germany

- German Air Force

Mozambique

- Military of Mozambique

Romania

- Romanian Air Force

Soviet Union

- Soviet Air Force

Sudan

- Government of Sudan – ST-PRA destroyed during the Battle of Khartoum (2023).

== Incidents and accidents ==
Since its first flight in 1963 there have been 12 fatal accidents during civilian service, namely: nine crashes, two landing overruns and an aborted takeoff (fatalities of the last three resulted from collisions with structures near the runway). The complete list of incidents include eight of Il-62M (a total of 25 incidents/accidents in ASN database, 14 of which were Il-62M, including 24 April 1998 and 20 April 2008).

As of July 2012 there had been 23 hull losses from all causes including prototype testing, fires, runway overruns, navigational errors, and non-operational incidents, 48% of which did not involve fatalities, with 1,141 fatalities total. This figure and the list below includes planes that were still operable but were deemed uneconomic to return to service due to their age and/or flight hours (YR-IRD and CU-T1283).

Within the group of comparable airliners (Il-62/Il-62M, VC10/Super VC10, Boeing 707, DC8) the Il-62M had the lowest hull loss rate.

Date	Tail number	Location	Casualties	Brief description	Refs
25 February 1965	СССР-06156	Zhukovsky Airfield, USSR	10/17	Crashed on takeoff during a test flight at maximum takeoff weight. The aircraft acquired a nose-high attitude and climbed to 3–4 m (9.8–13.1 ft), collided with a concrete fence and struck the ground.	
16 June 1972	SU-ARN	Almaza Air Base, Egypt	0/59	Overran the runway after landing at the wrong airport.	
14 August 1972	DM-SEA	Königs Wusterhausen, East Germany	156/156	Interflug Flight 450 lost control and crashed after the tail section failed in flight. Hot air at 300 °C (572 °F) escaping from an unsecured air-con coupling melted electrical insulation and caused a short circuit that started a fire in the cargo bay. After losing elevator function, the crew decided to return to Berlin but were unaware of the fire that eventually destroyed the tail section, rendering the aircraft uncontrollable. The crash was the worst in German history.	
13 October 1972	СССР-86671	Sheremetyevo, USSR	174/174	Aeroflot Flight 217 crashed 1 km short of the runway during the third attempt to land at night in poor weather. The cause was not determined. The Sheremetyevo airport ILS system was inoperative at the time of the accident.	
20 August 1975	OK-DBF	near Damascus, Syria	126/128	ČSA Flight 540 experienced a controlled flight into terrain at midnight some 17 km (11 mi) from the airport. The crew appeared possibly confused about the QNH and QFE altimeter settings due to language misunderstanding with the control tower.	
27 May 1977	СССР-86614	Havana, Cuba	67/69	Aeroflot Flight 331 struck power transmission lines and crashed 1 km short of the runway while attempting to land in poor weather.	
14 March 1980	SP-LAA	near Okęcie Airport, Poland	87/87	LOT Polish Airlines Flight 007 crashed due to a loss of control caused by uncontained failure of engine #2 which occurred after full thrust was applied during a missed approach from New York to Warsaw. Engine debris penetrated the fuselage causing damage to engine #1 & #3, and severed control rods for the rudder and elevators. The failed engine had reportedly caused vibrational problems when previously installed in two other LOT aircraft, and the turbine disc may have been already damaged when the engine was fitted. See discussion in Development section.	
6 July 1982	СССР-86513	Mendeleyevo, USSR	90/90	Aeroflot Flight 411 stalled and crashed after the pilot shut down both left side engines due to fire warnings. The unbalanced aircraft became difficult to control and crashed. Investigations later showed that the warning lights had been a false alarm, possibly caused by a hot-air bleed leak.	
29 September 1982	СССР-86470	Luxembourg	7/77	Aeroflot Flight 343 crashed on landing after the thrust reverser on engine #1 failed. The aircraft veered off the runway and continued into a ravine.	
1 July 1983	P-889	Labé, Guinea	23/23	A Korean Airways flight crashed in the Fouta Djallon mountains near Labé while operating a charter flight from Pyongyang Sunan International Airport to Conakry International Airport.	
9 May 1987	SP-LBG	Warsaw, Poland	183/183	LOT Polish Airlines Flight 5055 crashed following an uncontained engine failure and resultant in-flight fire. Engine #2 exploded during initial climb 25 minutes after takeoff, causing damage to engine #1 and a fire in the cargo hold. Landing at Gdansk or Modlin airfields were abandoned in favour of Warsaw (which had better fire-fighting equipment). The crew dumped half the fuel but control was lost during the return flight and the aircraft crashed. The #2 engine turbine shaft bearings had been improperly manufactured with 13 rollers instead of 26, causing overheating and seizure, destroying the shaft. The low-pressure turbine spun out of control and disintegrated. The crash was the worst involving an Il-62 and in Poland. See 'Development' section.	
17 June 1989	DDR-SEW	Schönefeld Airport, East Germany	21/113	Interflug Flight 102 overran the runway on takeoff and crashed due to jammed elevators and rudder. The pilot aborted the takeoff and when instructed to apply reverse thrust, the flight engineer mistakenly switched the engines off. Interflug's fleet of Il-62s were briefly grounded for elevator/rudder mechanism checks, but cleared for use the following day. Cause of crash was traced to maintenance error.	
3 September 1989	CU-T1281	Havana, Cuba	24+126/126	Cubana de Aviación Flight 9046 crashed on climbout in bad weather. The crew attempted takeoff in heavy rain and wind by reducing the flap setting from 30° to 15°, but this reduced the ability of the aircraft to gain altitude. Shortly after takeoff and while still at low altitude, the plane was caught in powerful downdrafts that forced one of the wings to strike navigational aerials and then a hillside before the plane crashed into a residential area.	
24 July 2009	UP-I6208	Mashhad, Iran	16/173	The sole fatal accident involving an Il-62 since 1989, Aria Air Flight 1525 struck a concrete perimeter wall following a runway overrun at excessive landing speed. This aircraft had originally been in service with Interflug followed by Aeroflot and Uzbekistan Airways before being acquired by Aria Air.	

== Aircraft on display ==
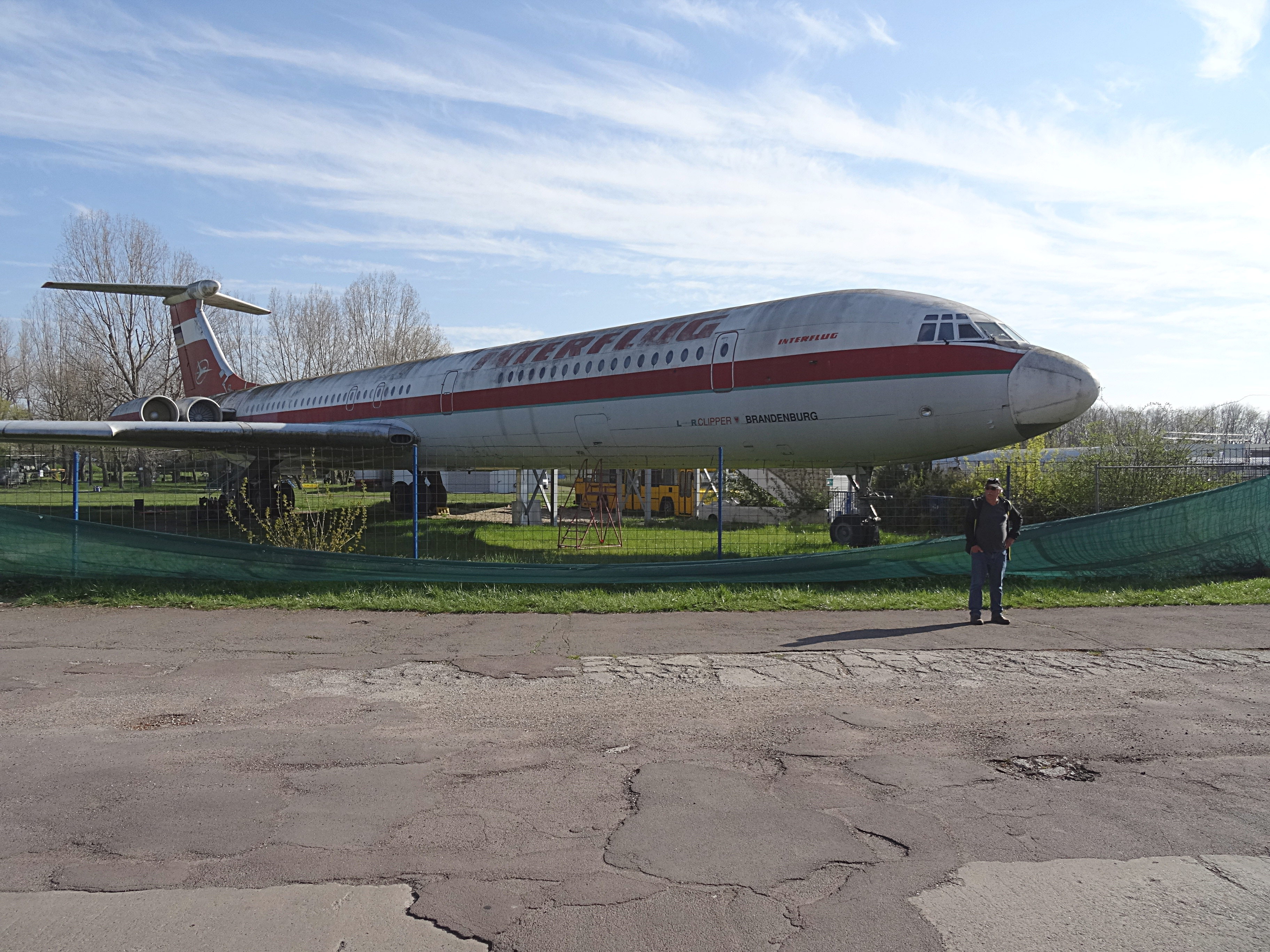
The preserved former Interflug Ilyushin Il-62 (registration DM-SEC) displayed at the Merseburg airfield.

As the first intercontinental passenger jet airliner to be put into service by a number of Soviet-bloc nations, several retired Ilyushin Il-62 airframes have been preserved as museums, restaurants, or monuments worldwide.

The following Ilyushin Il-62 aircraft are currently on public display:

- DM-SEC (c/n 10903) – Delivered in 1971 to Interflug, this aircraft was re-registered as DDR-SEC in 1981 before being restored to its original DM-SEC livery at the Luftfahrt- und Technikmuseum Merseburg in Merseburg, Germany.
- DDR-SEG (c/n 11004) – This former Interflug Il-62M, nicknamed Lady Agnes after Otto Lilienthal's wife, is preserved at the Flugplatz Stölln-Rhinow in Gollenberg, Germany. On 23 October 1989, Interflug's chief pilot Heinz-Dieter Kallbach intentionally landed the aircraft on an exceptionally short 860 m (2,820 ft) grass runway in a famous but potentially hazardous manoeuvre to deliver it to the site. Although fire trucks and ambulance crews were positioned on hand for emergency standby, the landing was completed successfully without incident. The jet is situated at the Gollenberg hill to commemorate the historical site of the fatal flying crash of aviation pioneer Otto Lilienthal in 1896. Its fuselage is currently divided and preserved as a museum housing the Lilienthal collection and an active wedding registry.

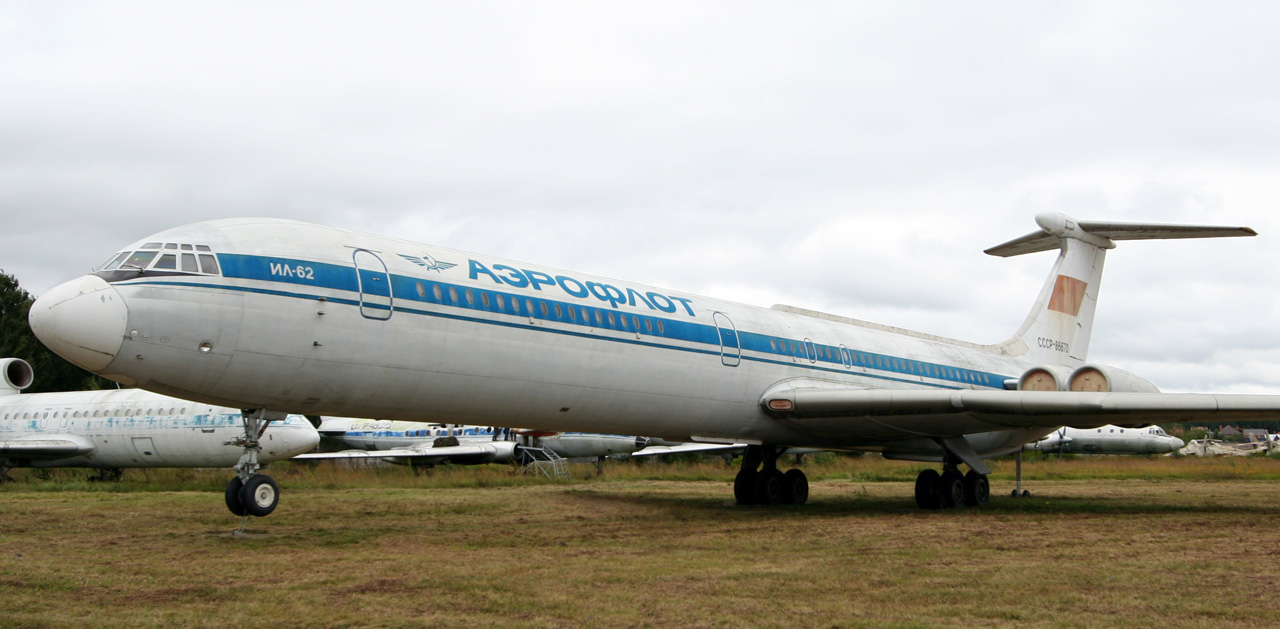
An Ilyushin Il-62 airliner in (registration CCCP-86670) preserved at the Central Air Force Museum in Monino, Russia. In 1983, this airframe was landed on the museum's unimproved dirt strip by test pilot Stanislav Bliznyuk.

- CCCP-86670 (c/n 11101) – Preserved at the Central Air Force Museum in Monino, Russia. In July 1983, this aircraft performed a famous landing on unimproved ground at the museum site, when Ilyushin OKB Chief Test Pilot Stanislav Bliznyuk flew and delivered the airframe directly to the outdoor Air Force exhibition.

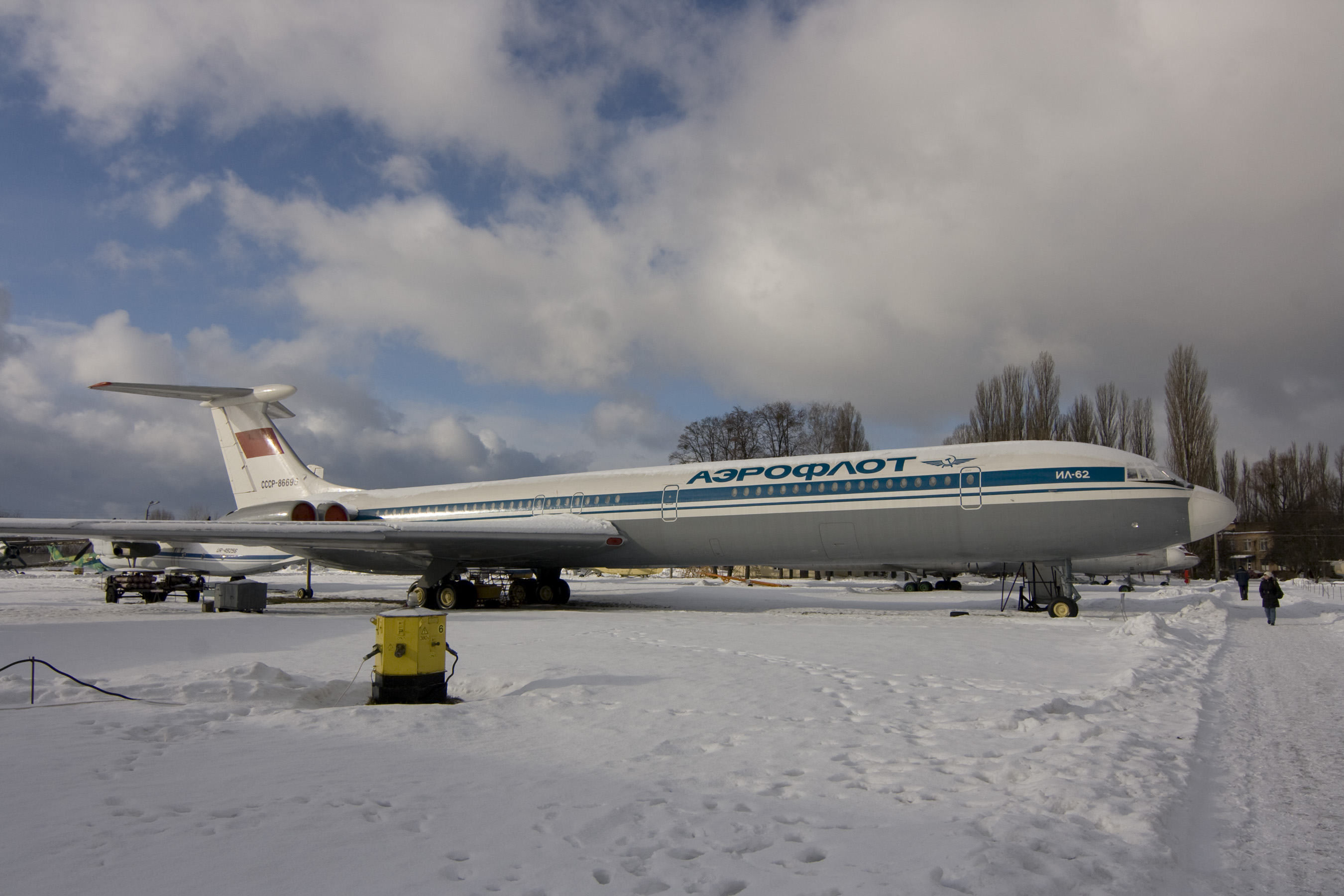
The preserved Soviet Aeroflot Ilyushin Il-62 (registration CCCP-86696) on display at the Ukraine State Aviation Museum in Kyiv, captured during winter.

- CCCP-86696 (c/n 11102) – Preserved at the Ukraine State Aviation Museum in Kyiv, Ukraine. The airframe carries the historical Soviet Aeroflot livery and remains open for interior tours.

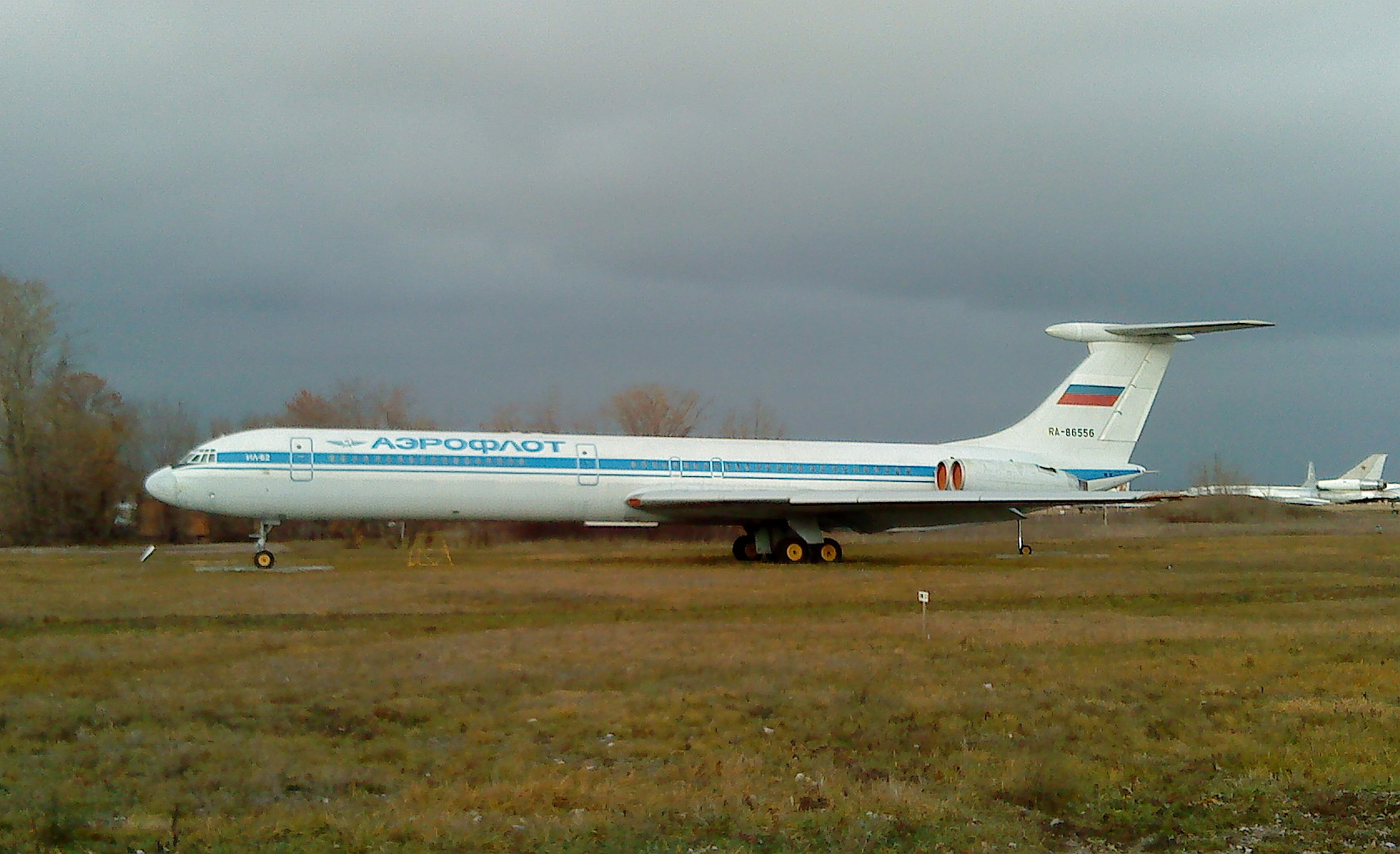
The preserved Ilyushin Il-62 (registration RA-86556, formerly CCCP-86556) on display at the Long-Range Aviation Museum on Engels Air Base, Russia.

- RA-86556 (c/n 31302) – Formerly registered as CCCP-86556, this early-production Il-62 is preserved in Aeroflot livery at the Museum of Long-Range Aviation on Engels Air Base near Saratov, Russia.
- RA-86513 (c/n 20503) – Preserved as an airport gate monument in full classic Aeroflot livery outside the main terminal of Khrabrovo Airport in Kaliningrad, Russia.
- OK-FBF (c/n 41805) – Originally operated as a VIP head-of-state transport for Czechoslovakia before serving with Czech Airlines (ČSA). It is now preserved at Excalibur City near Chvalovice, Czech Republic, where it functions as a restaurant jet.
- OK-GBH (c/n 62404) – Originally operated as a VIP head-of-state transport for Czechoslovakia before serving with Czech Airlines (ČSA). It was later moved to Graz, Austria in 2018, where it was placed on the roof of the Novapark Flugzeughotel and now functions as a restaurant bar.

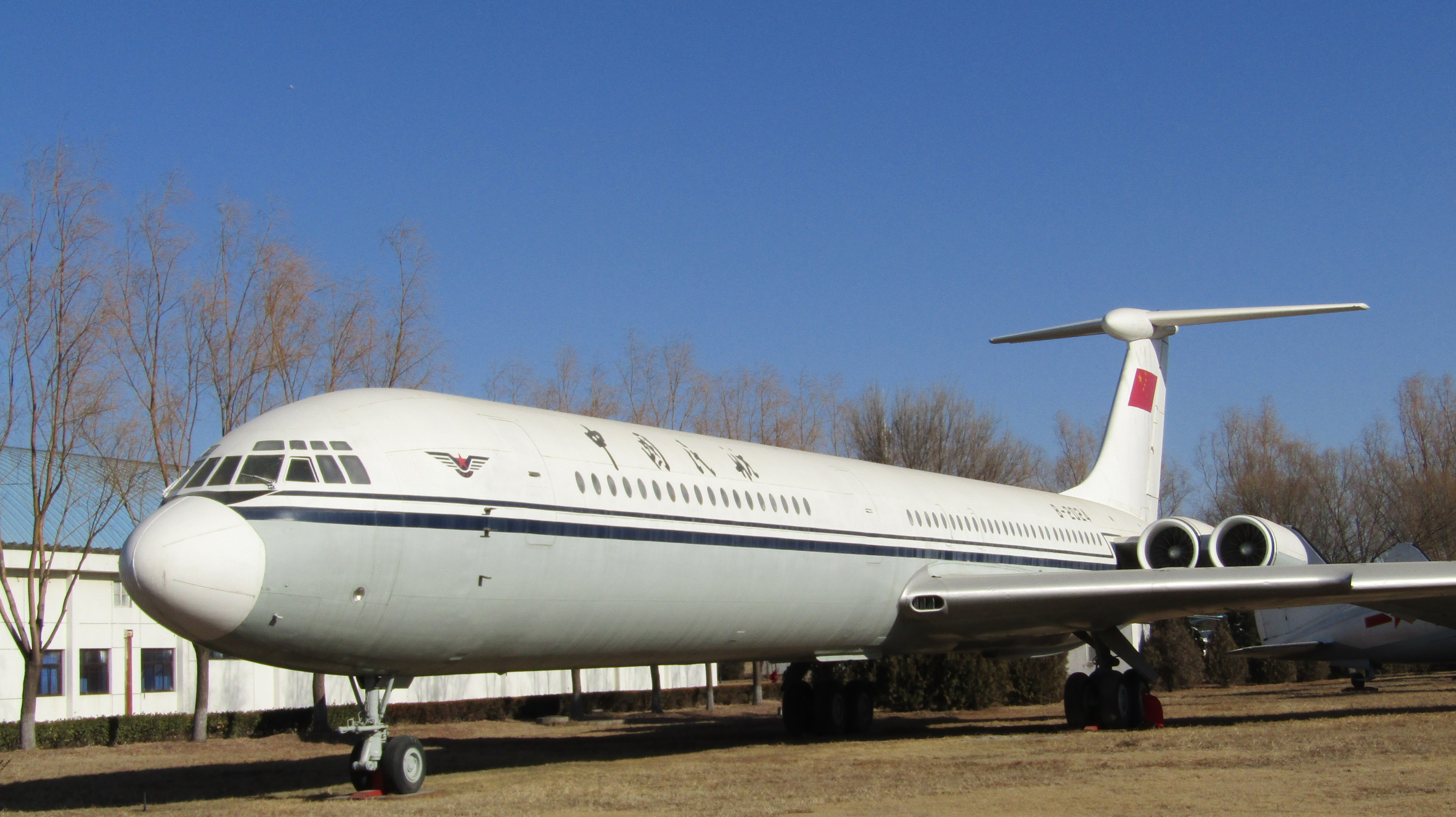
CAAC Airlines Il-62 at China Aviation Museum, Beijing.

- 2024 (c/n 31501) – A former CAAC Airlines aircraft preserved at the Chinese Aviation Museum (Datangshan Museum) in Changping, Beijing, China.
- CU-T1208 (c/n 2725635) – A former Cubana de Aviación Il-62M preserved as a walk-through museum exhibit at the Parque Lenin in Havana, Cuba.
- DDR-SEF (c/n 00702) – Another former Interflug airframe, preserved as the "Flieger-Bar" restaurant and pub in Heiligengrabe, Germany.
- Unmarked (c/n 2503664519) – A derelict, unpainted former Soviet Air Force Il-62 preserved as a ground instructional airframe near Vasylkiv Air Base, Ukraine.

== Specifications (Il-62M) ==
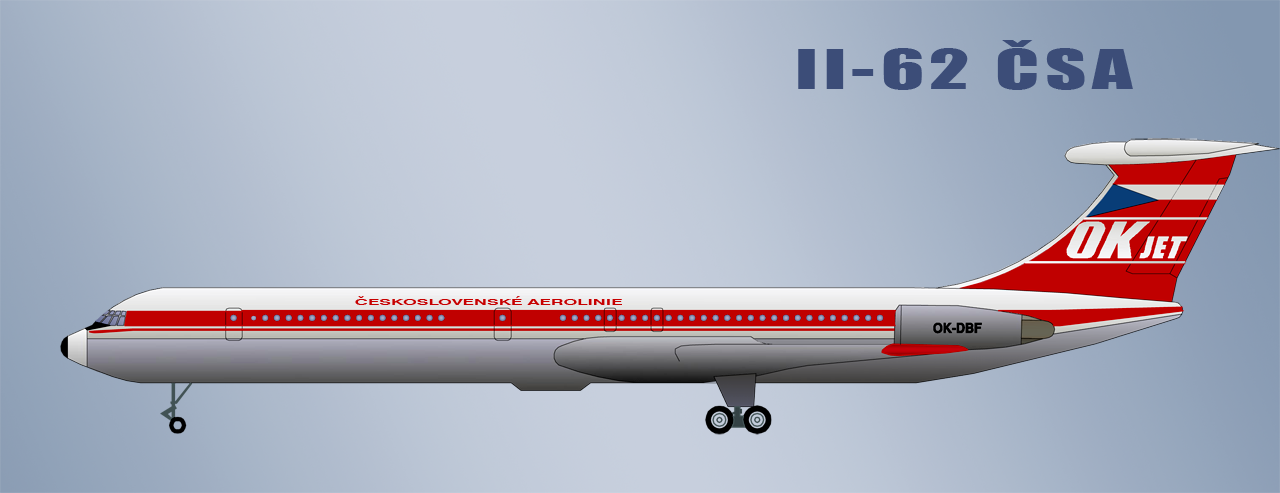
Side view.

Data from Jane's All The World's Aircraft 1988–89

General characteristics

- Crew: 5; 3 to 5 (a captain, a first officer, and a flight engineer, plus optionally a navigator and a radio officer on long overwater and/or VIP services to operator specification) plus a four to eight-person cabin crew to operator specifications
- Capacity: 168–186 passengers
- Length: 53.12 m (174 ft 3 in)
- Wingspan: 43.20 m (141 ft 9 in)
- Height: 12.35 m (40 ft 6 in)
- Wing area: 279.55 m^{2} (3,009.1 sq ft)
- Empty weight: 71,600 kg (157,851 lb)
- Max takeoff weight: 165,000 kg (363,763 lb)
- Fuel capacity: 105,300 L (27,800 US gal; 23,200 imp gal) / 84,240 kg (185,720 lb)
- Powerplant: 4 × Soloviev D-30KU turbofan engines, 107.9 kN (24,300 lbf) thrust each

Performance

- Cruise speed: 900 km/h (560 mph, 490 kn)
- Range: 10,000 km (6,200 mi, 5,400 nmi) with 10,000 kg (22,046 lb) payload
- Service ceiling: 12,000 m (39,000 ft) maximum cruising height
- Rate of climb: 18 m/s (3,500 ft/min)

== See also ==
Aircraft of comparable role, configuration, and era

- Boeing 707
- Boeing 720
- Convair 880
- Convair 990 Coronado
- Douglas DC-8
- Shanghai Y-10
- Vickers VC10

Related lists

- List of jet airliners
- List of civil aircraft

== Sources ==
- Dawes, Alan. "Ilyushin Il-62 – A Classic of its Time". Air International, January 2004, Vol 66 No 1. pp. 30–36. ISSN 0306-5634.
- Gordon, Yefim. Dmitry Komissarov and Sergey Komissarov. OKB Ilyushin: a History of the Design Bureau and its Aircraft. Hinkley, UK: Midland Publishing, 2004. ISBN 1-85780-187-3.
- Gunston, Bill. The Osprey Encyclopedia of Russian Aircraft 1975–1995. London: Osprey, 1995. ISBN 1-85532-405-9.
- Ilyushin IL-62. Aircraft of the World, no. 66, group 2. IMP (International Masters Publishers) AB, 1997.
- Taylor, John W. R. Jane's All The World's Aircraft 1988–89. Coulsdon, UK: Jane's Defence Data, 1988. ISBN 0-7106-0867-5.
- Thiel, Jorg: Airliner in Service around the World, No. 2: IL-62 (NARA-Verlag, 2001, ISBN 3-925671-20-X) (text in German and English).
