= List of defunct airlines of Belarus =

This is a list of defunct airlines of Belarus.

| Airline | Image | IATA | ICAO | Callsign | Commenced operations | Ceased operations | Notes |
|---|---|---|---|---|---|---|---|
| Aeroconcept | | | | | 1999 | 2000 | |
| BAS-Belarussky Aviatsionny Servis | | | | | 1995 | 2002 | |
| Belair | | | BLI | | 1991 | 1999 | |
| Gomelavia-Gomel Airlines | | YD | GOM | GOMEL | 1993 | 2011 | Previously Gomel United Aviation Detachment |
| Grodno Aviakompania | | | GRX | GRODNO | | | Merged into Belavia in 2024 |
| Minskavia | | 4M | MEN | MINSK | 1996 | 1998 | Operations transferred to Belavia |
| Mogilevavia | | | MOG | | 1996 | 2002 | Originally a Belavia branch |
| Techaviaservice | | | BTS | | 1994 | 1999 | |
| Wings Air Service | | | | | 1993 | 1996 | |

== See also ==
- List of airlines of Belarus
- List of airports in Belarus
