= ČSA Flight 540 =

1975 aviation accident in Syria

Coordinates: 33.5194°N 36.6694°E

Československé Státní Aerolinie (ČSA) Flight 540
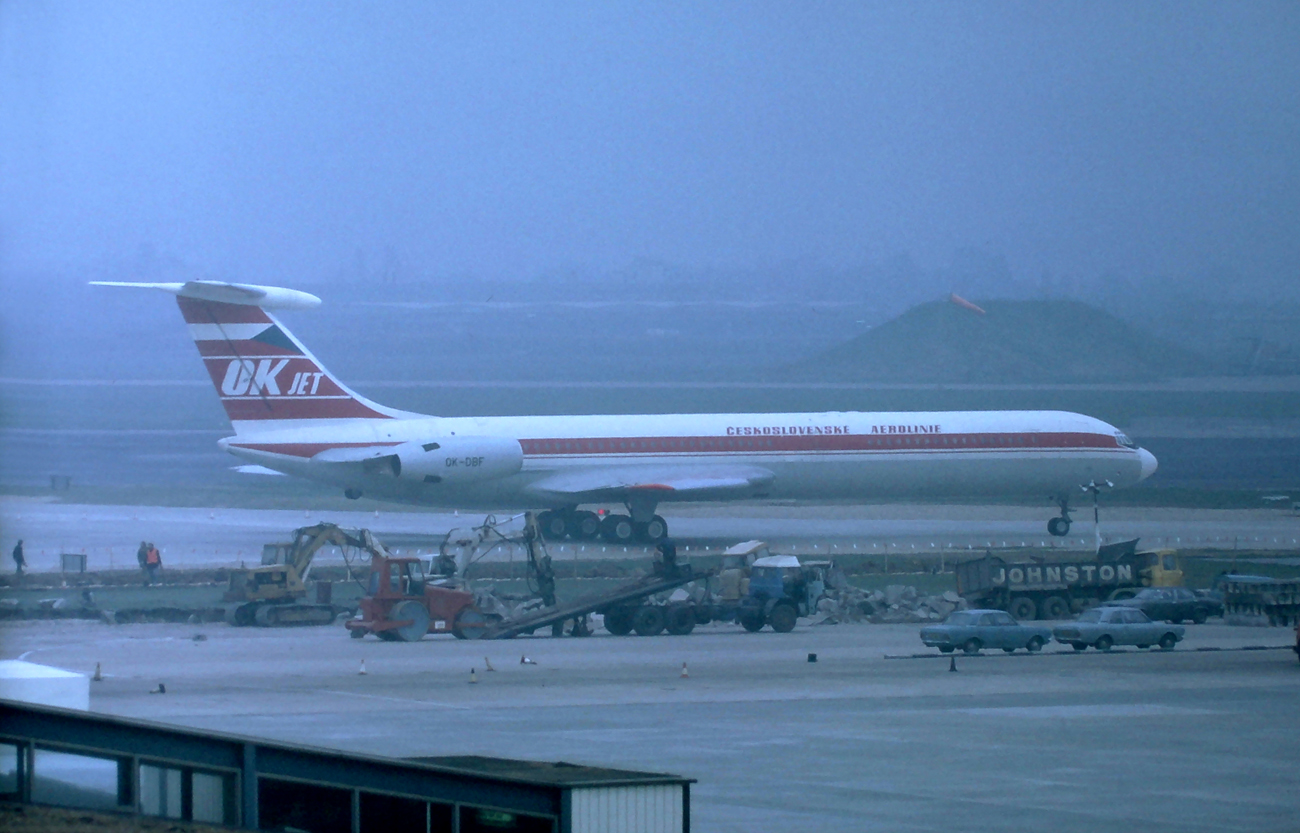
- OK-DBF, the aircraft involved in the accident, photographed in 1974 with a previous livery

Accident
- Date: 20 August 1975
- Summary: Controlled Flight Into Terrain for unknown reasons
- Site: 17 km NE of Damascus International Airport, Syria

Aircraft
- Aircraft type: Ilyushin Il-62
- Aircraft name: Brno Trade Fair
- Operator: ČSA (Československé Státní Aerolinie)
- IATA flight No.: OK540
- ICAO flight No.: CSA540
- Call sign: CSA-LINES 540
- Registration: OK-DBF
- Flight origin: Prague-Ruzyně International Airport, Czechoslovakia
- 1st stopover: Damascus International Airport, Syria
- 2nd stopover: Baghdad International Airport, Iraq
- Destination: Mehrabad International Airport, Iran
- Occupants: 128
- Passengers: 117
- Crew: 11
- Fatalities: 126
- Injuries: 2
- Survivors: 2

ČSA Flight 540 was a regularly scheduled international flight from Prague, Czechoslovakia to Tehran, Iran via Damascus, Syria and Baghdad, Iraq. On 20 August 1975, the flight, operated by an Ilyushin Il-62, crashed 17 km (11 mi) from Damascus International Airport while descending at night in clear weather, breaking up and catching fire on impact. 126 of the 128 passengers and crew died in the accident, making it Syria's worst air disaster and the worst air disaster for the airline. Following the crash, the Czechoslovak government sent their condolences to the victims and Damascus.

== Aircraft and crew ==
The aircraft involved was an Ilyushin Il-62 with registration OK-DBF. It was produced in 1973 and delivered to the airline in the same year. The aircraft was named Brno Trade Fair.

At the time of the accident, the flight captain was Ján Gajdoš (54) with 19,000 flight hours (circa 3000 on Il-62), who led the crew consisting of co-pilot Stanislav Žižka (50) with 15,000 flight hours (circa 2500 on Il-62), navigator František Aulík (43), and flight engineers Karel Hasman (48) and Vladimír Hejduk, who was just off duty. Purser Miroslav Peták was joined by a team of five cabin crew. In total, there were 117 passengers and 11 crew on board.

== Accident ==
The plane crashed in an area of high desert approximately 17 km from Damascus Airport. (Note: The crash site is at 605 metres (1,985 ft) AMSL.)

Initially there were 3 survivors, but one of them, a boy died on the way to the hospital. That brought the death toll to 126 with 2 survivors.

Nationality	Passengers	Crew	Survivors	Total
Czechoslovakia	52	11	0	63
Syria	25	0	1	25
Poland	3	0	0	3
Spain	1	0	0	1
Hungary	1	0	0	1
East Germany	1	0	0	1
Unknown	34	0	1	34
Total	117	11	2	128

One of the Polish victims was Konrad Swinarski, theatre director and theatre manager.

The Hungarian victim was Tihamér Vujicsics (Serbian: Тихомир Вујичић / Tihomir Vujičić), composer and folk music collector of Serbian descent.
