= List of airlines of Belarus =

This is a list of airlines which have an air operator's certificate issued by the Department for Aviation of Belarus.

As of 2024, all airlines certified by the Department for Aviation of Belarus are banned from EU airspace. This is due to the diversion of Ryanair flight 4978 in 2021, as well as Belarus' involvement in the ongoing Russian invasion of Ukraine.

== Scheduled airlines ==
Airline	IATA	ICAO	Image	Callsign	Commenced operations	Hub airport(s)	Notes
Belavia	B2	BRU		BELAVIA	1996	Minsk National Airport	Flag carrier

== Cargo airlines ==
Airline	IATA	ICAO	Image	Callsign	Commenced operations	Hub airport(s)	Notes
Genex		GNX		AEROGENEX	2006	Minsk National Airport	
Ruby Star		RSB		RUBYSTAR	2003	Minsk National Airport	
TransAVIAexport Airlines	AL	TXC		TRANSEXPORT	1992	Minsk National Airport	renamed TAE Avia in 2021
Rada Airlines		RDA		RADA	2015	Minsk National Airport	

== See also ==
- List of defunct airlines of Belarus
- List of airlines
- List of defunct airlines of Europe
