= DETA Air =

Airline of Kazakhstan

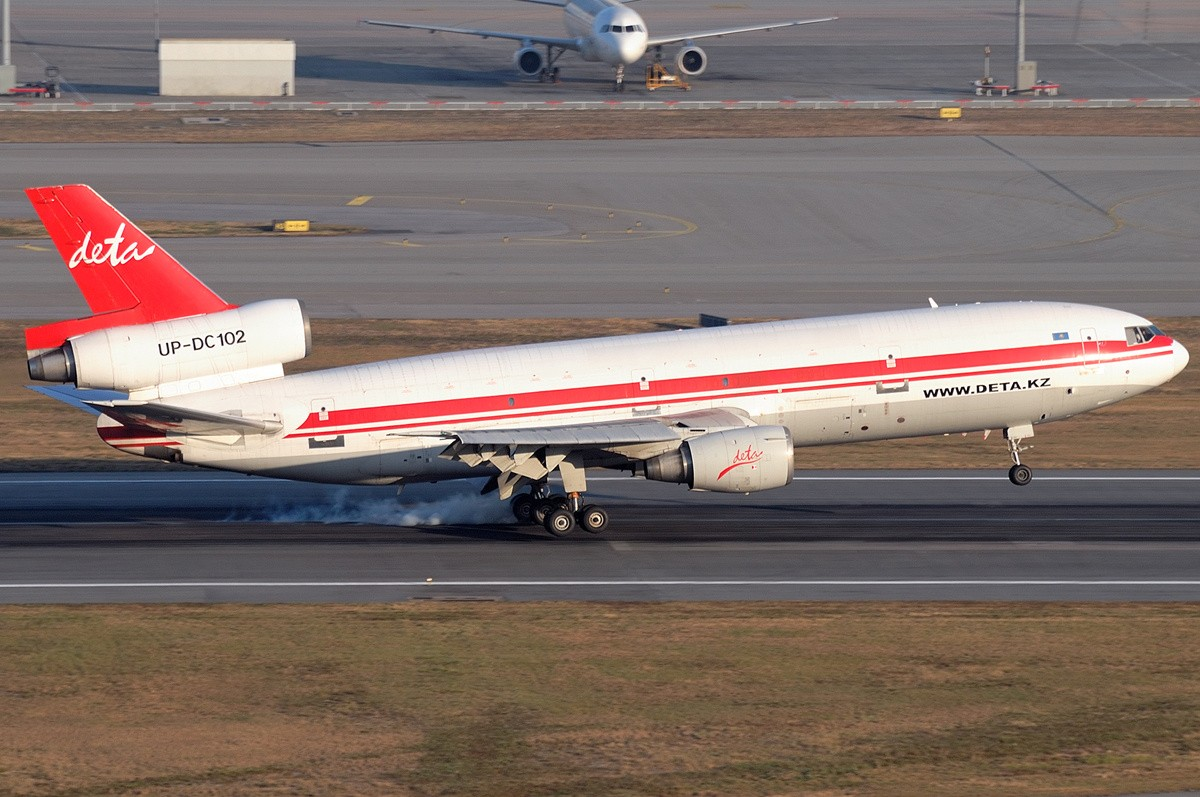
IATA	ICAO	Call sign
9D	DET	SAMAL
- Founded: 2003
- Commenced operations: 2006
- Ceased operations: 2013
- Hubs: Almaty International Airport
- Fleet size: 4-7
- Destinations: 6
- Headquarters: Almaty, Kazakhstan
- Website: www.deta.kz

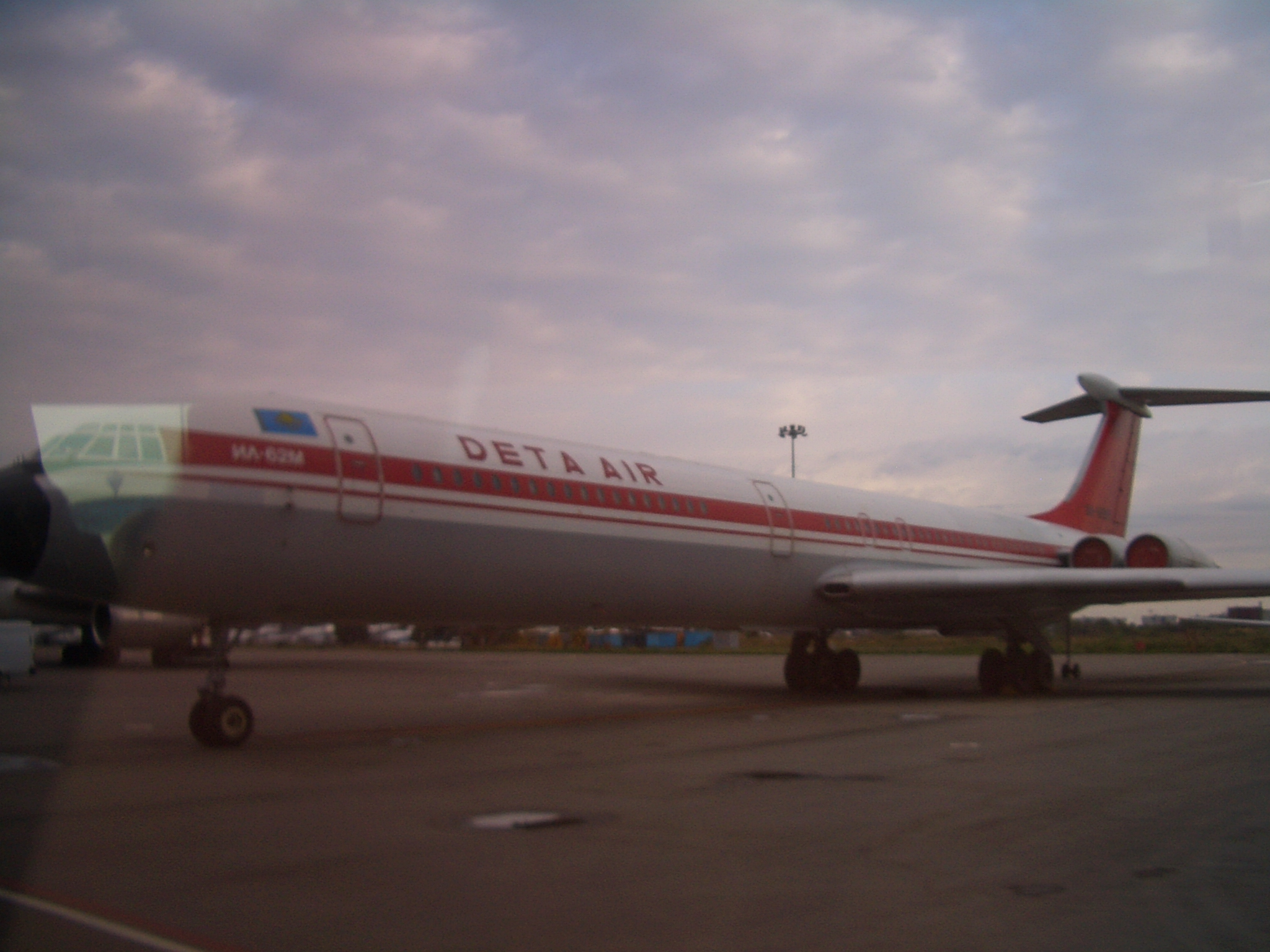
A retired Ilyushin Il-62 of DETA Air at Almaty International Airport.

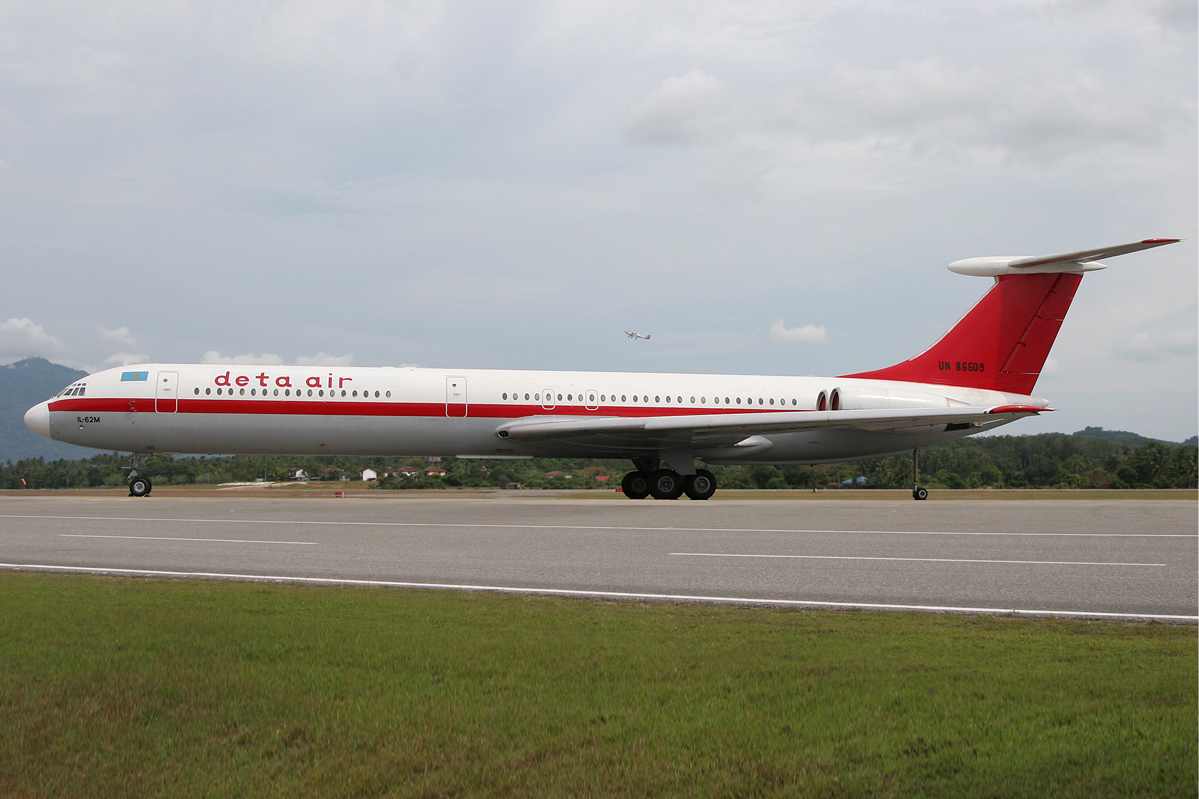
A retired Ilyushin Il-62 of DETA Air.

D.E.T.A. LLP operating as DETA Air was a cargo and passenger airline, with bases in Almaty and Shymkent, Kazakhstan. Their principal scheduled cargo routes were to Hong Kong and Istanbul. Although focused on cargo, DETA also operated some scheduled and charter passenger flights.

== History ==
DETA was founded in 2003. Originally a travel agency, it expanded into a cargo airline in 2005, leasing an IL-62M. Its first cargo flight was in January 2006 between Almaty and Istanbul. In December 2006, DETA flew its first passenger flight, to Bali.

The company performed a variety of passenger and cargo transportation services. By 2009, the company had four IL-62M airplanes, two for cargo, one for passengers, and one mixed passenger/cargo. It added DC-10 airplanes in 2009 for a cargo route between Istanbul, Almaty, Shymkent, and Hong Kong.

The airline struggled to carve out a profitable path, with the Kazakh commercial market covered by SCAT Airlines and Air Astana. It purchased a Boeing 737-500 in 2011 but had to lease it out within a year. The company suspended operations in 2012, and its operating license was revoked by the Kazakh government in 2013.

== Destinations ==
DETA Air served the following airports:

China

- Shanghai - Shanghai Pudong International Airport (Cargo)
- Hohot - Hohhot Baita International Airport charter

Georgia

- Tbilisi - Tbilisi International Airport charter

Kazakhstan

- Almaty - Almaty International Airport
- Şymkent - Şymkent International Airport

Hong Kong

- Hong Kong International Airport (Cargo)

Turkey

- Istanbul - Sabiha Gokcen International Airport (Cargo)

United Arab Emirates

- Fujairah - Fujairah International Airport (Cargo)

== Fleet ==
The fleet operated by DETA Air is detailed below:

Historic fleet of DETA Air
Aircraft	Image	Total	Introduced	Retired	Notes
McDonnell Douglas DC-10-40		2	2009	2012	
Boeing 737-500		1	2011	2011	
Ilyushin Il-62M	A DETA Air Ilyushin Il-62M at the airport.	4	2006	2011	
