= LOT Polish Airlines Flight 007 =

1980 aviation accident in Poland

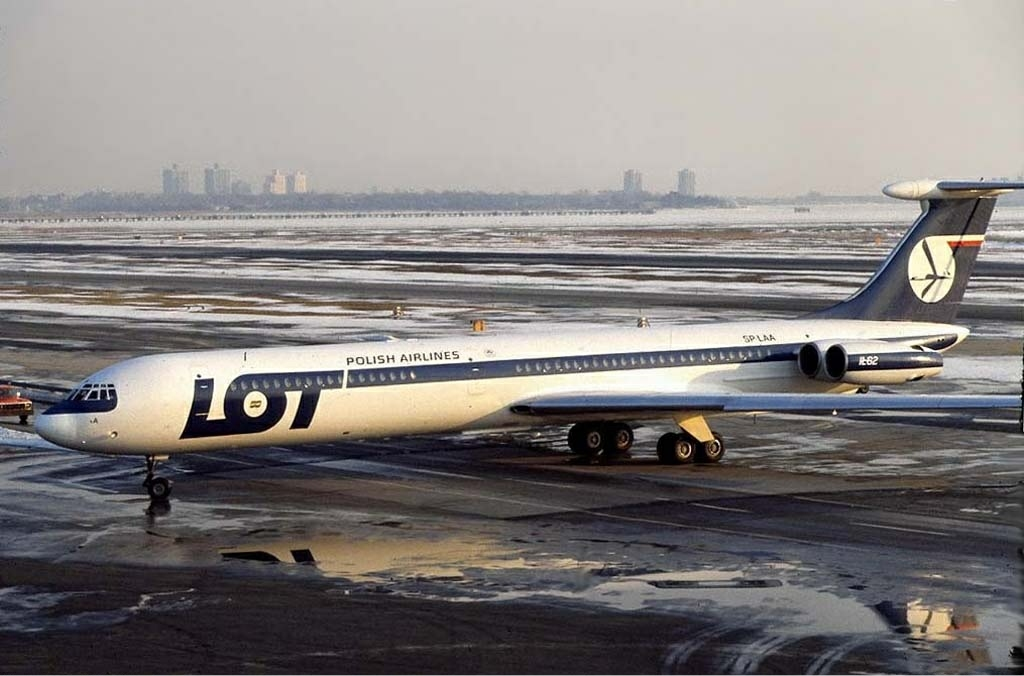
- SP-LAA, the aircraft involved in the accident, seen in 1979

Accident
- Date: 14 March 1980
- Summary: Faulty turbine shaft led to uncontained engine failure and loss of flight controls
- Site: Near Warsaw-Okecie Airport, Poland; 52°11′06.5″N 20°56′46.3″E

Aircraft
- Aircraft type: Ilyushin Il-62
- Aircraft name: Mikołaj Kopernik
- Operator: LOT Polish Airlines
- IATA flight No.: LO007
- ICAO flight No.: LOT007
- Call sign: LOT 007
- Registration: SP-LAA
- Flight origin: John F. Kennedy International Airport, New York (JFK/KJFK)
- Destination: Warsaw-Okecie Airport, Poland (WAW/EPWA)
- Occupants: 87
- Passengers: 77
- Crew: 10
- Fatalities: 87
- Survivors: 0

LOT Polish Airlines Flight 007 was a scheduled international passenger flight from New York City to Warsaw. On 14 March 1980, the Ilyushin Il-62 operating the flight,, crashed into the moat of a 19th-century fort near Warsaw's Okęcie Airport while attempting a go-around, killing all 77 passengers and 10 crew on board.

As the crew increased engine power for the go-around, a fatigue fracture of the turbine shaft in one of the four engines caused a turbine disc to disintegrate, and its fragments damaged two other engines and severed the elevator and rudder controls. A Polish government commission attributed the failure to hidden material and manufacturing defects in the engine shaft, a finding that the Soviet side rejected until a similar shaft failure caused the crash of LOT Polish Airlines Flight 5055 in 1987. Archival documents made public in 2010 showed that LOT's practice of running engines beyond their service life had also contributed to the accident.

== Aircraft ==
The aircraft was a Soviet-built Ilyushin Il-62 with the manufacturer's serial number 11004, completed in 1971. It was registered SP-LAA and named after Nicolaus Copernicus, whose Polish name is Mikołaj Kopernik. It was the first Il-62 in the fleet of LOT, which received it in March 1972, and it allowed the airline to open long-haul routes that its Ilyushin Il-18s could not fly. On 16 April 1973, the aircraft flew LOT's inaugural transatlantic service, from Warsaw to New York. LOT eventually operated seven Il-62s, all named after famous Poles.

The aircraft was powered by four Kuznetsov NK-8-4 turbofan engines, mounted in pairs at the rear of the fuselage, a layout in which the failure of one engine could endanger the engine next to it. Engine No. 2 was the inner engine on the left side.

=== Crew ===
All ten crew members were Polish. The captain, Paweł Lipowczan, had worked for LOT for 15 years and had 8,770 flight hours, about half of them on the Il-62. He was a former test parachutist and had flown with the Warsaw Aero Club. The first officer, Tadeusz Łochocki, had joined LOT a year after Lipowczan and had more than 1,800 hours on the Il-62. The navigator was Konstanty Chorzewski. The radio operator, Stefan Wąsiewicz, had worked for LOT for almost 30 years, and he had swapped flights with a colleague for personal reasons. The flight engineer, Jan Łubniewski, was standing in for Ryszard Chmielewski, who had stayed in New York because he felt unwell. Chmielewski was killed seven years later in the crash of LOT Polish Airlines Flight 5055, on which he was the instructor flight engineer. The cabin crew consisted of five flight attendants.

== Accident ==
=== Departure and flight ===
On 13 March 1980, the aircraft flew from Warsaw to New York as Flight 006 and landed at John F. Kennedy International Airport in the afternoon, with no technical faults reported. After a short technical check and refuelling, a different crew took over for the return flight to Warsaw as Flight 007. The flight was scheduled to leave at 19:00 EST and to arrive in Warsaw at about 09:40 CET the next morning. Heavy snow delayed the departure by more than two hours, while the runway was cleared and the aircraft was de-iced. The aircraft took off at 21:18, although some accounts give the time as 21:16. Seventy-seven tickets had been sold for the flight.

The flight was normal after take-off. The aircraft reached Scottish airspace at dawn and then entered Polish airspace, passing over Darłowo and Grudziądz at about 10:35 CET. Near Płońsk, the flight was handed over to Okęcie approach control.

=== Approach ===
The weather in Warsaw was cold and sunny, with good visibility, although the low morning sun created glare for aircraft approaching from the north. The crew was cleared to approach runway 15 after a change of landing runway. Because a domestic flight was landing ahead of it, the controller directed Flight 007 onto an extended approach pattern. At 11:13, the crew began the final descent about 8 km (5.0 mi) from the airport. About 70 seconds before the planned landing, the crew reported that the landing gear indicator had not lit up, and, following the standard procedure, they decided to go around. The controller cleared them to climb from about 250 m (820 ft) to 650 m (2,130 ft), and this was the last radio exchange with the aircraft.

=== Engine failure and crash ===
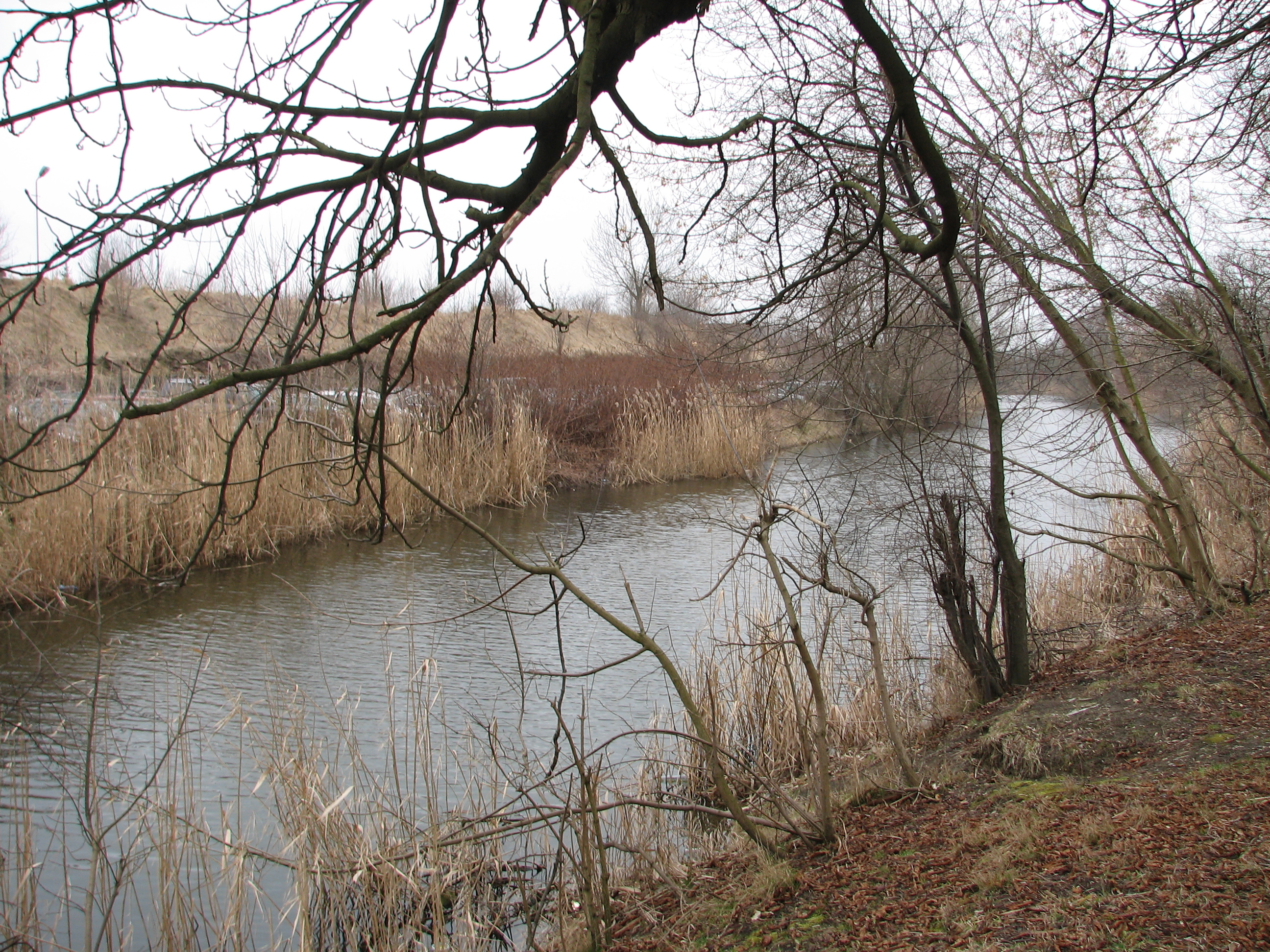
The crash site at Fort VI

As the engines were brought up to take-off power for the climb, the low-pressure turbine shaft of engine No. 2 broke. Freed from its load, the turbine accelerated to about 130 per cent of its maximum speed, and a turbine disc burst into three pieces about a tenth of a second later. The failure occurred about 3.5 km (2.2 mi) from the airport. Fragments of the disc damaged engines No. 1 and No. 3, pierced the rear fuselage and severed the push rods of the elevator and rudder, as well as electrical wiring that included the power supply to the flight recorders. Engines No. 2 and No. 3 stopped working, and the crew lost control of the aircraft.

The crew set engines No. 2 and No. 3 to idle and kept engine No. 4, the only one still working normally, at take-off power. About 12 seconds before impact, they advanced the throttle of engine No. 1. With only the ailerons still working, the pilots turned the descending aircraft to the right, away from the buildings of a juvenile detention centre. The right wing struck a tree and broke away. At 11:14:45, 26 seconds after the engine failure, the aircraft struck the frozen moat of Fort VI of the Warsaw Fortress at a nose-down angle of 13°, about 950 m (3,120 ft) short of the threshold of runway 15. The fort was part of the city's 19th-century fortifications. The ice on the moat was about 35 cm (14 in) thick, and the moat was 3.5 m (11 ft) deep. The aircraft broke apart, but it did not catch fire, because little fuel remained in its tanks. All 87 people on board were killed.

Air traffic control transcript

Time (CET)	Speaker	Transmission or event
Final approach
11:13:11	Okęcie control	007, final descent on a three-degree glide path.
11:13:15	LOT 007	007.
11:13:18	Okęcie control	Left by five, one-five-five.
	LOT 007	One-five-five.
11:13:46	Okęcie control	007, left by five degrees.
11:13:52	Okęcie control	007?
11:13:54	LOT 007	Yes, wait... We have a problem with the landing gear indication. We're going around.
11:14:00	Okęcie control	Understood. Runway heading and six-five-zero.
11:14:04	LOT 007	Runway heading, six-five-zero.
11:14:06	Okęcie control	Yes.
11:14:19	—	[Engine No. 2 disintegrates]
11:14:45	—	[Impact]

== Victims ==
Occupants by nationality
Nationality	Passengers	Crew	Total
Poland	42	10	52
United States	28	0	28
Soviet Union	4	0	4
East Germany	3	0	3
Total	77	10	87

The aircraft carried 77 passengers and 10 crew members, who were citizens of Poland, the United States, the Soviet Union and East Germany. Among the passengers were 22 members of a United States amateur boxing delegation, 14 boxers and 8 coaches and officials, who were travelling to compete against the Polish national team in dual meets in Katowice and Kraków. Many of the boxers had hoped to qualify for the United States team at the 1980 Summer Olympics in Moscow. Accounts differ on the total number of Americans on board. The American Presidency Project gives 29, comprising the 22 members of the boxing delegation and 7 other Americans, while the researcher Tomasz Berdzik gives 31 American passengers, of whom 30 were identified.

Other passengers included the Polish singer Anna Jantar and the American ethnomusicologist Alan P. Merriam of Indiana University, who was travelling to lecture at the Institute of Musicology of the University of Warsaw. Six students from Warsaw universities were returning from a conference of the student organisation AIESEC.

== Rescue and recovery ==
Buses, fire engines and ambulances were sent to the crash site, and LOT's management, the Minister of Communications and the commander of the Warsaw militia arrived shortly afterwards. About 250 firefighters and more than 550 militia officers took part in the operation. Pumps from the Bogdanka coal mine were brought in to drain the moat so that the wreckage could be recovered. Families waiting at the airport were told only of a delay at around noon, and a list of the victims was compiled and checked until the evening. The bodies were taken to the Institute of Forensic Medicine in Warsaw for autopsy. A team of American experts, including dentists and specialists in aviation medicine and toxicology, helped with the identification, and four victims were identified from fingerprints by the Federal Bureau of Investigation. Valuables were recovered from the site, although there were reports of looting before the area was secured.

== Investigation ==
On the day of the crash, the government set up a special commission to investigate it, headed by Deputy Prime Minister Tadeusz Wrzaszczyk. At the time of the accident, a conference on the safety of passenger flights was being held at Okęcie Airport. The prosecutor's office opened its own inquiry the same day and assigned it to the investigation unit of the Warsaw militia. The flight recorders were recovered, but they were of little help, because both stopped when their wiring was cut, and the flight data recorder, which had a fault, recorded only the time and the engine speeds. The last 26 seconds of the flight were therefore not recorded.

=== Engine failure ===
Investigators found that engine No. 2 was badly damaged and that a disc of its low-pressure turbine was missing. Fragments of the engine were found along the flight path, outside the engine nacelles, together with heat and friction marks showing that the damage had occurred in flight. The engine's main shaft had failed through metal fatigue. Investigators attributed the fatigue to a notch left by a lathe tool, a rougher surface than the standards allowed and the lack of reinforcement where the shaft changed diameter. On 25 March 1980, after tests for explosives and corrosive substances, sabotage and the involvement of a third party were ruled out. Soviet representatives claimed that the Il-62 could maintain level flight on one engine, but they refused to supply engine data. Polish calculations, made with engine specifications obtained unofficially, showed that a single engine could slow the aircraft's descent but could not keep it in level flight.

=== Conclusions ===
In mid-April 1980, the commission published its report, which attributed the crash to the failure of the left inner engine's turbine, caused by an unlucky combination of circumstances and by hidden material and manufacturing defects that had led to premature fatigue of the engine shaft. It found that, with only one working engine and control through the ailerons alone, the crew had steered the aircraft so that it struck open ground. The commission found no other contributing factors, and it raised no concerns about the crew's qualifications, health or preparation for the flight. Alcohol tests on the crew were negative. According to Newsweek Polska, the findings, which in effect blamed Soviet industry, were widely accepted by the Polish public.

The commission recommended eliminating the material and manufacturing defects in the engine, considering design changes to protect the control systems from turbine debris, developing diagnostic equipment for low-pressure shafts, inspecting all NK-8-4 engines, fitting LOT's aircraft with MSRP-64 flight recorders and adding procedures for flying with more than two engines out. It also recommended that the aircraft's control systems be duplicated. The prosecutor's office discontinued its inquiry on 30 March 1981, finding that no crime had been committed and that the sole cause of the crash was the rupture of the engine shaft. No one was held criminally or disciplinarily responsible.

=== Soviet response ===
The Soviet side rejected the commission's findings. Soviet representatives first blamed pilot error and later argued that the damage to engine No. 2 had been caused by the impact with the ground, so that the shaft failure was a result of the crash rather than its cause. According to Berdzik, the manufacturer did not implement the commission's recommendations. The Soviet side accepted the Polish findings only after the crash of Flight 5055 in 1987, which was also caused by the failure of an engine shaft.

=== Declassified findings ===
The investigation by the counterintelligence department of the Ministry of Internal Affairs was classified, and its files were later transferred to the archive of the Institute of National Remembrance. In 2010, documents in the archive reviewed by Newsweek Polska showed that the Polish authorities and LOT had contributed to the accident through the overuse of engines and the dispatch of aircraft with known defects.

From the late 1970s, the government of Edward Gierek demanded savings from LOT as the Polish economy deteriorated. To avoid the higher fuel prices abroad, the airline's aircraft were filled with fuel in Poland, often to their maximum take-off weight, which placed extra stress on the engines during take-off from Okęcie. The NK-8-4 engines were guaranteed by their manufacturer for 5,000 hours, but LOT extended their service life in stages, and engines were run for up to about 8,600 hours. According to Newsweek Polska, LOT informed the Ilyushin design bureau that tests in Poland had shown that the engines could run for 8,600 hours without an overhaul, and the bureau replied that the manufacturer was responsible only for the first 5,000 hours. Because of a shortage of serviceable engines, LOT adopted the practice of fitting an aircraft with three engines that were within their guaranteed life and one that had exceeded it, known among the airline's technicians as a "leader". The magazine reported that the savings on engine overhauls and fuel amounted to 29 million złoty, or US$6.5 million at the time, and that on 11 January 1980, LOT's director and 18 of its staff received bonuses from the deputy minister of transport.

Engine No. 2 had previously been fitted to two other LOT Il-62s. It was removed in 1975 after damage to a compressor blade and repaired in the Soviet Union, and it was removed again in 1978 because of excessive vibration and repaired in Poland before being installed on SP-LAA. At the time of the crash, engine No. 1 had run 5,537 hours, engine No. 2 had run 5,459 hours, engine No. 3 had run 8,001 hours and engine No. 4 had run 3,178 hours. Engine No. 3 had run these hours without an overhaul. Before the aircraft left Warsaw for New York, a mechanic noticed a dent in a turbine blade of engine No. 1, but he found that the defect had already been recorded in the aircraft's technical log and that the aircraft had been cleared to fly. The instrument landing system at Okęcie had also been out of service for 51 days after being damaged on 23 January 1980. In 1981, LOT's acting director was removed from his post.

== Aftermath ==
=== LOT and the Il-62 fleet ===
On 15 March 1980, after a copy of a magazine article about the bonuses was posted on the door of the crew room at Okęcie, LOT pilots refused to fly Il-62s fitted with engines that had exceeded their service life. On 22 March, the Ilyushin design bureau's chief designer, Genrikh Novozhilov, and the engine designer Sergei Mukhin met the pilots. LOT withdrew the "leader" engines from service, and the pilots were promised the newer Il-62M.

LOT had begun receiving Il-62Ms in 1979. As the new aircraft entered service, the airline's older Il-62s were handed over to the Soviet Union as part of a settlement, and they were replaced by nine Il-62Ms. After the crash of Flight 5055 in 1987, LOT began replacing its Il-62Ms with Boeing 767s, and the last of them was withdrawn in the early 1990s.

=== Reactions and media coverage ===
The Polish authorities declared two days of mourning, and artistic and sporting events in Warsaw were cancelled. President Jimmy Carter issued a statement expressing the nation's sadness and offering condolences to the families of the victims, particularly those of the members of the boxing team, who he said had represented the United States well. Under censorship, Polish press coverage was limited to official statements and dispatches of the Polish Press Agency, eyewitness accounts were not published, and the story disappeared from the news within days. A 1974 order of the censorship office already barred the media from reporting defects in the state airline's aircraft. In the absence of information, rumours spread, including claims of sabotage and of the involvement of the security services.

=== Funerals and memorials ===
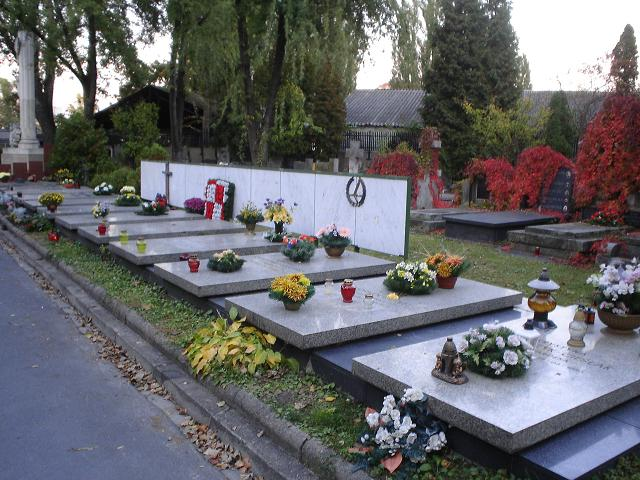
Grave of the crew at the Powązki Military Cemetery

The crew members were buried at the Powązki Military Cemetery in Warsaw, and the LOT employees killed in the crash of Flight 5055 seven years later were buried near them. A street in the Okęcie district, near the threshold of runway 15, was named after Lipowczan. The juvenile detention centre that the crew had avoided was later also named after him. A symbolic memorial on the grounds of the fort, a cross bearing a piece of the aircraft, was destroyed by vandals in 2013. A monument to the victims stands at the crash site, where anniversary ceremonies are held.

A small monument to the American boxers stood at the Skra Warsaw sports ground until 2013, when it was moved to a site near the Olympic Centre in Żoliborz. In 1984, a statue honouring the boxing delegation, showing a boxer seated on a tall triangular base, was dedicated at the United States Olympic training centre in Colorado Springs. USA Boxing commemorates the victims on each anniversary of the crash.

== See also ==
- List of accidents and incidents involving commercial aircraft
- List of accidents involving sports teams
- LOT Polish Airlines Flight 5055 (1987) – another Il-62 crash near Warsaw caused by disintegration of an engine shaft
