= LOT Polish Airlines Flight 5055 =

1987 aviation accident in Poland

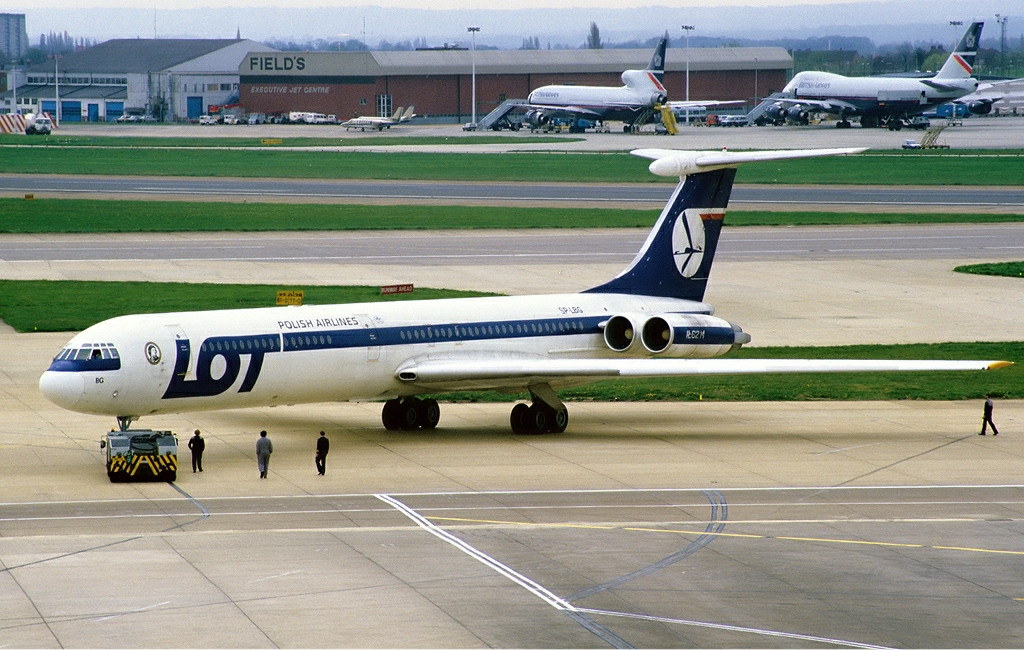
- SP-LBG, the aircraft involved in the accident, seen in April 1987

Accident
- Date: 9 May 1987
- Summary: Uncontained engine failure leading to in-flight fire and destruction of control systems
- Site: Kabaty Woods nature reserve, near Warsaw Frederic Chopin Airport, Warsaw, Poland; 52°06′48″N 21°02′40″E

Aircraft
- Aircraft type: Ilyushin Il-62M
- Aircraft name: Tadeusz Kościuszko
- Operator: LOT Polish Airlines
- IATA flight No.: LO5055
- ICAO flight No.: LOT5055
- Call sign: LOT 5055
- Registration: SP-LBG
- Flight origin: Warsaw Frederic Chopin Airport, Warsaw, Poland
- Stopover: John F. Kennedy International Airport, New York City, New York, United States
- Destination: San Francisco International Airport, San Francisco, California, United States
- Occupants: 183
- Passengers: 172
- Crew: 11
- Fatalities: 183
- Survivors: 0

LOT Polish Airlines Flight 5055 was a scheduled international passenger flight from Warsaw to New York City. In the late-morning hours of 9 May 1987, the Ilyushin Il-62 operating the flight crashed in the Kabaty Woods nature reserve on the outskirts of Warsaw around 54 minutes after departure. All 183 passengers and crew on board were killed in the crash, making it the deadliest accident involving an Ilyushin Il-62, and the deadliest aviation disaster in Polish history.

The accident was determined to have been caused by the disintegration of an engine shaft due to faulty bearings. This led to a catastrophic failure of the two left engines and then an onboard fire, both of which eventually destroyed all flight-control systems.

== Background ==
=== Aircraft ===
The aircraft was a 186-seat Ilyushin Il-62M built in 1983, registered SP-LBG and named after Tadeusz Kościuszko, a Polish military leader and national hero. It was one of seven Il-62Ms that LOT bought from the Soviet Union in 1983, and it was used on international routes. By the time of the accident, it had flown 6,971 hours and made 1,752 landings, against a service life of 30,000 hours and an overhaul interval of 10,000 hours. Other accounts give different flight-time totals, with the writer Aleksander Grobicki citing just over 5,000 hours and the journalist Jarosław Reszka just under 7,000 hours. It was powered by four Soloviev D-30KU turbofan engines mounted in pairs at the rear of the fuselage. The two engines on the left side were numbered 1 (outer) and 2 (inner). On 8 May 1987, the aircraft returned to Warsaw from a transatlantic flight from Chicago and underwent a routine six-hour check in preparation for its next transatlantic flight.

=== Crew ===
All of the crew members were Polish. The captain, Zygmunt Pawlaczyk, aged 59, had been a military pilot since 1951 and had joined LOT in 1955. He had 19,745 flight hours, including 5,542 hours on the Il-62, of which 3,725 were as captain. The first officer, Leopold Karcher, had been a military pilot since 1956 and had joined LOT in 1967. He had 10,899 flight hours, of which 2,357 were on the Il-62. The navigator was Lesław Łykowski, and the radio operator was Leszek Bogdan. The flight engineer, Wojciech Kłossek, had been an instructor flight engineer on the Ilyushin Il-18 from 1985 and a flight engineer on the Il-62M since 1986. He had 5,100 flight hours, of which 291 were on the Il-62M. An instructor flight engineer, Ryszard Chmielewski, who had 10,571 flight hours, of which 6,695 were on the Il-62, was on board to monitor Kłossek's progress. The cabin crew consisted of five flight attendants.

== Accident ==
=== Departure and climb ===
The aircraft's take-off weight was 167 tonnes. After receiving clearance at 10:17 CEST, it took off from runway 33 at Okęcie Airport at 10:18. It climbed along airway R23 towards Grudziądz, and it was due to leave Polish airspace near Darłowo. Because the aircraft had not reached 18,000 ft (5,500 m) by the time it passed the TMN beacon near Płońsk, approach control instructed the crew to level off at 16,000 ft (4,900 m). Military aircraft were operating at 17,000 ft (5,200 m), and civilian controllers had no radio contact with them to ensure separation. Area control then took over the flight, which continued at 16,000 ft. At 10:31, area control ordered an expedited climb to the cruising altitude of 31,000 ft (9,400 m), and the flight engineer set the engines to full take-off power for 30 seconds. The flight continued normally until 10:41.

=== Engine failure ===
At 10:41, 23 minutes into the flight, the aircraft was passing over Warlubie, near Grudziądz, at an altitude of 8,200 m (26,900 ft) and a speed of 815 km/h (440 kn), when the low-pressure turbine of engine No. 2 disintegrated. Turbine fragments damaged engine No. 1 and set it on fire, punctured the rear fuselage and caused an explosive decompression, and severed electrical cables. The crew reported the decompression, the loss of two engines and a fire. The cause of the failure was unknown to the crew, who initially thought that the aircraft had been struck by something, although one crew member said that there had been an explosion in an engine.

Pawlaczyk declared an emergency and decided to leave the planned route and turn back towards Warsaw. Because of the decompression, he also began a rapid descent to 4,000 m (13,000 ft). During the turn, the crew noticed that the flight controls were not working properly. The elevator no longer responded, and the crew could control the aircraft's pitch only with the elevator trim tab, which is normally used to balance the aircraft aerodynamically. At 10:44, the warning system indicated that the engine fire had been extinguished, and the crew began preparing to dump fuel. The Il-62M's maximum landing weight was 107 tonnes, and only 6 tonnes of fuel had been used since take-off. Fuel could be dumped only in straight flight, not while circling over a limited area. The flight engineer found that only one of the aircraft's four electrical generators was working, and the crew switched off non-essential electrical equipment. Because the fuel dump valves were electrically operated, power interruptions prevented them from working properly. The crew briefly considered landing at Gdańsk, but Pawlaczyk decided to return to Warsaw.

=== Diversion and approach ===
With engines No. 1 and 2 shut down and the aircraft still heavy, Pawlaczyk could not maintain altitude, and the aircraft gradually descended. As the situation worsened, he asked to divert to the military airfield at Modlin. Warsaw air traffic control contacted military controllers to obtain permission, while the crew weighed the lack of information on Modlin's runway and weather conditions. By then the aircraft had descended to about 3,000 m (9,800 ft), and the crew noticed sparks at the rear of the aircraft. Permission to land at Modlin was granted at 10:54, and the crew received details of the runway's position, length and approach heading.

Information on the weather at Modlin, particularly the wind direction, was slow to arrive, and the crew reconsidered landing at Okęcie, which had full emergency cover for what was likely to be a crash landing. At 11:00, Pawlaczyk decided to continue to Okęcie. Its rescue services were better equipped for the emergency landing of a large airliner than those at Modlin, although Modlin was also prepared. At that point, the aircraft was about 90 km (56 mi) from Okęcie, flying at 495 km/h (267 kn) at an altitude of 2,050 m (6,730 ft).

Air traffic control directed the aircraft towards Piaseczno, and Pawlaczyk ordered the cabin crew to prepare the passengers for an emergency landing. At 11:04, about 35 tonnes of fuel remained in the tanks, and the crew managed to reopen the dump valves and jettison fuel down to 32 tonnes before dumping stopped again. Because of the fire, Pawlaczyk asked to land on runway 15, but the crew had difficulty establishing the aircraft's position relative to the runway. He therefore decided to approach runway 33 from the direction of Piaseczno, circling Okęcie to the west over Raszyn, which allowed a landing into the wind at a lower ground speed and on a steeper approach path. Near Józefosław, about 10 km (6.2 mi) from the runway, burnt parts of the structure and cabin fittings fell from the aircraft and started fires on the ground.

=== Crash ===
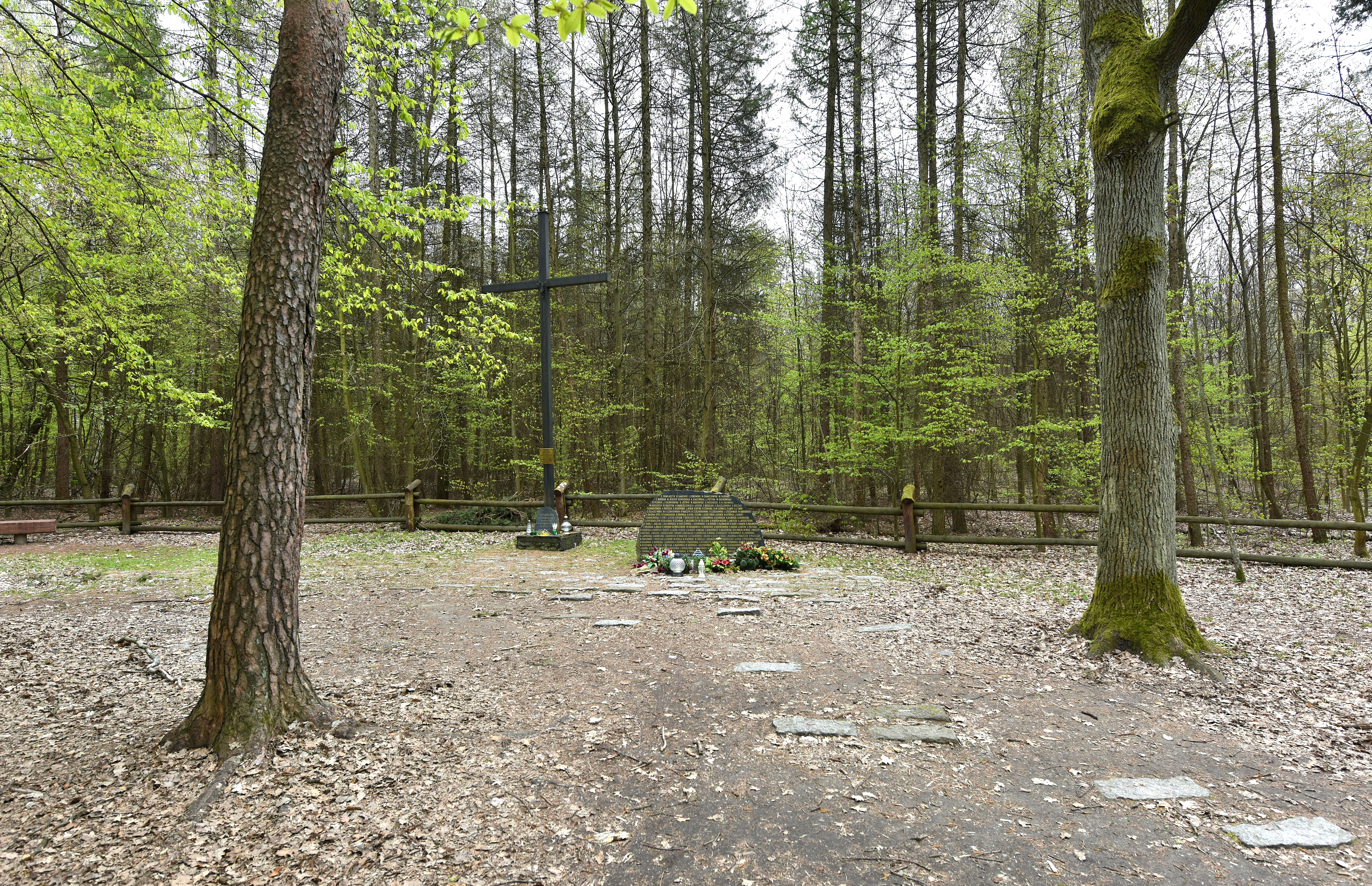
The crash site in the Kabaty Woods in 2017

The final approach began at 11:08, when a warning indicated that the landing gear had not extended, which meant that the aircraft would have to make a belly landing. The crew also reported a fire in the baggage hold. Air traffic control proposed the shortest possible route to the runway, and Pawlaczyk, who was finding the aircraft increasingly difficult to control, flew a tighter turn. The fire, which was visible to witnesses on the ground, damaged the trim control system, and the aircraft began alternately to descend and climb. Less than 6 km (3.7 mi) from the airport, the crew could not correct one of these oscillations, and the aircraft dived towards the Kabaty Woods. About a minute before impact, Pawlaczyk radioed, "We are turning left. We will do all we can."

At 11:12:13, the aircraft struck the trees of the Kabaty Woods at about 470 km/h (250 kn), 5,700 m (3.5 mi) from the runway. The last words recorded from the cockpit were "Dobranoc, do widzenia! Cześć, giniemy!" ("Good night, goodbye! Bye, we're dying!"). The aircraft disintegrated on impact, and everyone on board was killed instantly.

Air traffic control and cockpit voice recorder transcript

Time (CEST)	Speaker	Transmission or sound
Climb
10:26	LOT 5055	Well, we're going to New York. Maybe we'll make it to flight level 180...
10:26	Approach control	Gentlemen, you won't make it. You have about 5 km (3.1 mi) to TMN. I told you the clearance was for 180 or higher. Military aircraft are training there, and I have no communication with them to provide separation.
10:26	LOT 5055	Roger. Roger.
	Approach control	Maintain one-six-zero. You're approaching TMN now. Further climb will be approved by area control. For now, frequency one-three-four decimal eight-seven. Goodbye.
10:27:50	LOT 5055	Understood. Goodbye. LOT 5055.
	LOT 5055	Warsaw Radar, good morning, LOT 5055.
	LOT 5055	5055, passing TMN at two-seven, maintaining flight level one-six-zero, estimating Grudziądz at four-zero.
10:31:35	Area control	5055, heading 310, climb immediately to flight level 170 [17,000 ft (5,200 m)].
10:31:39	LOT 5055	5055, heading 310.
10:31:41	Area control	Climb immediately. I mean immediately.
Engine failure
10:41:28	—	[Intermittent autopilot disconnection warning]
10:41:30	Crew	Hey! Pressurisation!
10:41:32	—	[Cabin decompression warning bell]
10:41:34	Crew	Is there a fire? What's going on?
10:41:35	Crew	Probably a fire.
10:41:37	Crew	Engine? Shut it down!
10:41:39	Crew	...shut down. The first one is burning!
10:41:42	Crew	...fire...
10:41:44	Crew	...all to idle. [referring to the engine throttles]
10:41:45	Crew	Warsaw?
10:41:46	Crew	...all to idle. Decompression.
10:41:48	Crew	Two engines are gone!
10:41:49	—	[Continuous engine fire warning]
10:41:50	Crew	Two engines are gone! [...] Shut down... [...] We're turning back! Fire!
10:41:55	Crew	Emergency! Warsaw Radar, LOT! Warsaw Radar!
Final approach
11:09:47	Okęcie tower	From your present position you have about 15 km (9.3 mi) to the runway.
	Crew	Understood.
	Crew	...left! Engines to the left!
11:10:13	Okęcie tower	5055, left, left heading zero-five-zero.
	Crew	OK.
11:10:40	Okęcie tower	5055, left heading 360.
	Crew	We want to turn. That's exactly what we want.
	Okęcie tower	Keep turning, heading three-six-zero. You now have about 12 km (7.5 mi) to the runway.
	Crew	OK.
11:11:02	Okęcie tower	5055, left heading 330.
	Crew	We are turning left.
	Okęcie tower	Start the final approach about 11 km (6.8 mi) from the runway.
	Crew	We will do all we can.
	Okęcie tower	Understood.
	Okęcie tower	Left heading 320.
	Crew	Understood.
11:11:34	Okęcie tower	You are right of the runway centreline. Continue left, heading 300.
	Okęcie tower	Wind 290 degrees, 22 km/h (12 kn). Cleared to land runway three-three.
	Crew	OK.
11:12:10	—	[Transmitter keyed four times, with fragments of unintelligible speech]
	Crew	Good night, goodbye! Bye, we're dying!

== Victims ==
Occupants by nationality
Nationality	Passengers	Crew	Total
Poland	155	11	166
United States	17	0	17
Total	172	11	183

The aircraft carried 172 passengers and 11 crew. Seventeen of the passengers were United States citizens, and 21 of the Polish passengers lived permanently abroad, although Grobicki gives the latter figure as 25. Five of the passengers were LOT employees. The oldest passenger was 95 years old, and the youngest was about 18 months old, although the journalist Marek Sarjusz-Wolski gives the youngest passenger's age as two. One booked passenger missed the flight because her customs clearance was prolonged after she failed to declare a fur coat.

While preparing for the emergency landing, the cabin crew found that one of the flight attendants was missing. The crew linked her disappearance to a door that might have been torn away, and some press reports suggested that she had been sucked out of the aircraft during the decompression. A search of the forests around Warlubie by a regiment of the Motorised Reserves of the Citizens' Militia found no trace of her, and her body was not identified at the crash site. She was probably in the rear technical compartment, which was damaged by turbine fragments, when she lost consciousness from the drop in pressure and lack of oxygen and died in the fire in the rear fuselage, and her remains were most likely among the 62 bodies that could not be identified.

== Rescue and recovery ==
The Warsaw fire brigade was informed at 11:08 that the aircraft would be dumping fuel, and at 11:09 that a fire was likely. At 11:12, the duty officer was notified of the crash by the airport fire service and by a local resident, who reported fire and smoke rising from the Kabaty Woods. Firefighters extinguished a fire covering about 6 hectares (15 acres), secured the site against onlookers and searched an area of about 7 hectares (17 acres) for anyone needing help, although the state of the wreckage made survival appear impossible. Fires started along the approach path by debris falling from the aircraft and by dumped fuel were put out by about 12:00. In all, 44 firefighting sections with 195 firefighters took part in the operation. More than 700 soldiers of the Polish People's Army, together with local residents, searched the area near Grudziądz for engine parts that had fallen from the aircraft.

Both flight recorders were recovered from the wreckage. Some of the passengers' belongings were also recovered, among them a New Testament in which a passenger had written on the title page, "9 May 1987. The aircraft's damaged... God, what will happen now". The inscription showed that the passengers had been aware of the emergency. No body was found intact, and only 121 of the victims were identified. Press reports of looting at the crash site were not confirmed by the prosecutor's office, although Reszka considered it likely that some looting had taken place before the police and the army secured the area.

== Investigation ==
Prime Minister Zbigniew Messner appointed a special government commission to investigate the accident, chaired by Deputy Prime Minister Zbigniew Szałajda. Its members included officials from the Ministry of Transport, the armed forces, the Citizens' Militia, the fire service, the Prosecutor General's office, LOT and the Institute of Aviation. A separate investigation was carried out by the Warsaw Voivodeship Prosecutor's Office. The commission first met on 11 May 1987 and had access to both flight recorders. Most of the technical work was carried out by a technical subcommission, which worked with Polish research institutes and universities, LOT's technical department, the Soviet State Scientific Research Institute of Civil Aviation and the design bureaus of the aircraft and engine. The commission's official statement said that specialists from the aircraft and engine manufacturers had taken part and had provided all the necessary materials. In practice, however, the commission received no data from the manufacturer beyond the standard manuals for crews and maintenance staff, and all calculations of the aircraft's flight mechanics had to be made from scratch.

=== Engine failure ===
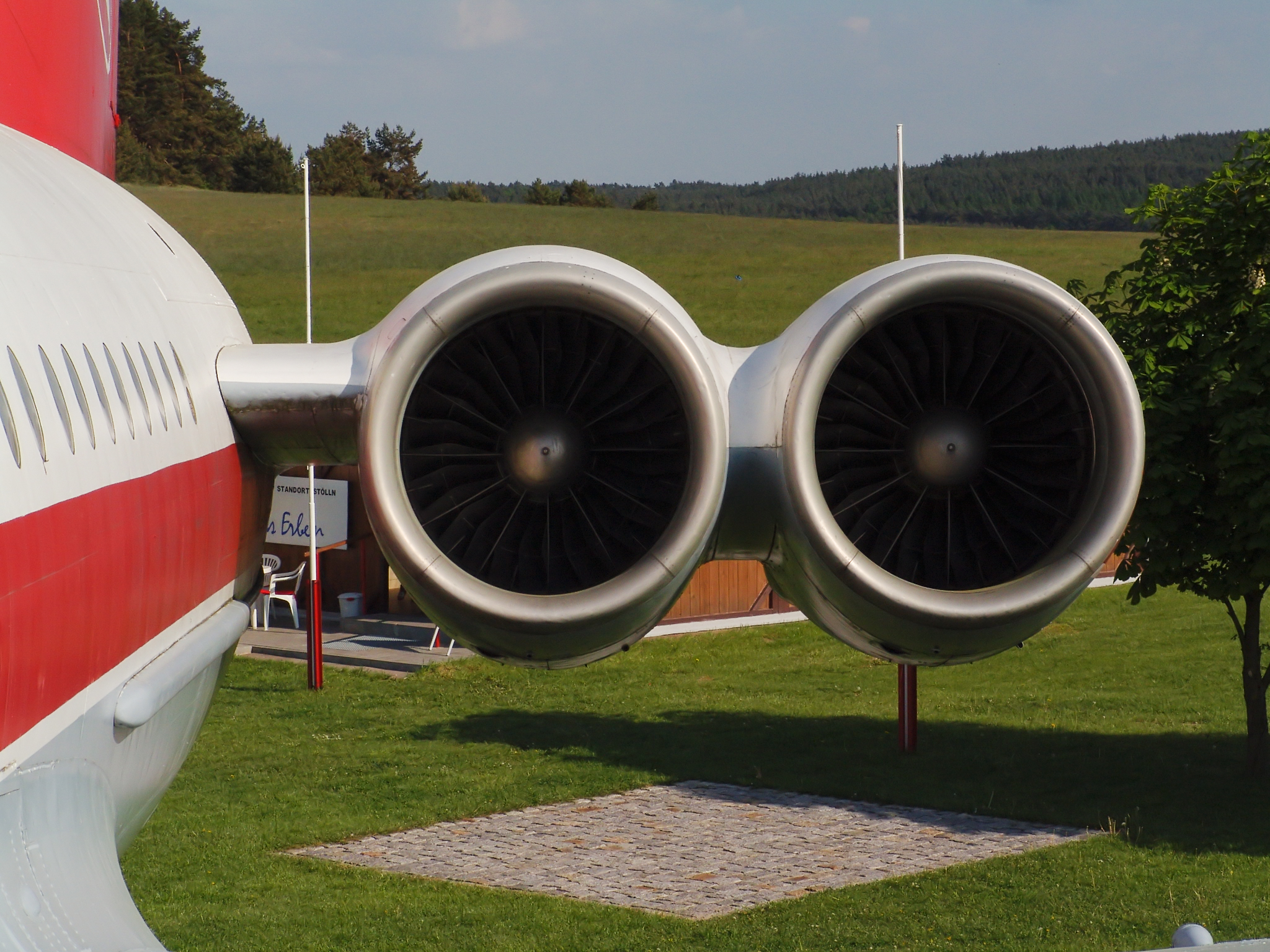
The left-hand engines of an Il-62: No. 1 (outer) and No. 2 (next to the fuselage)

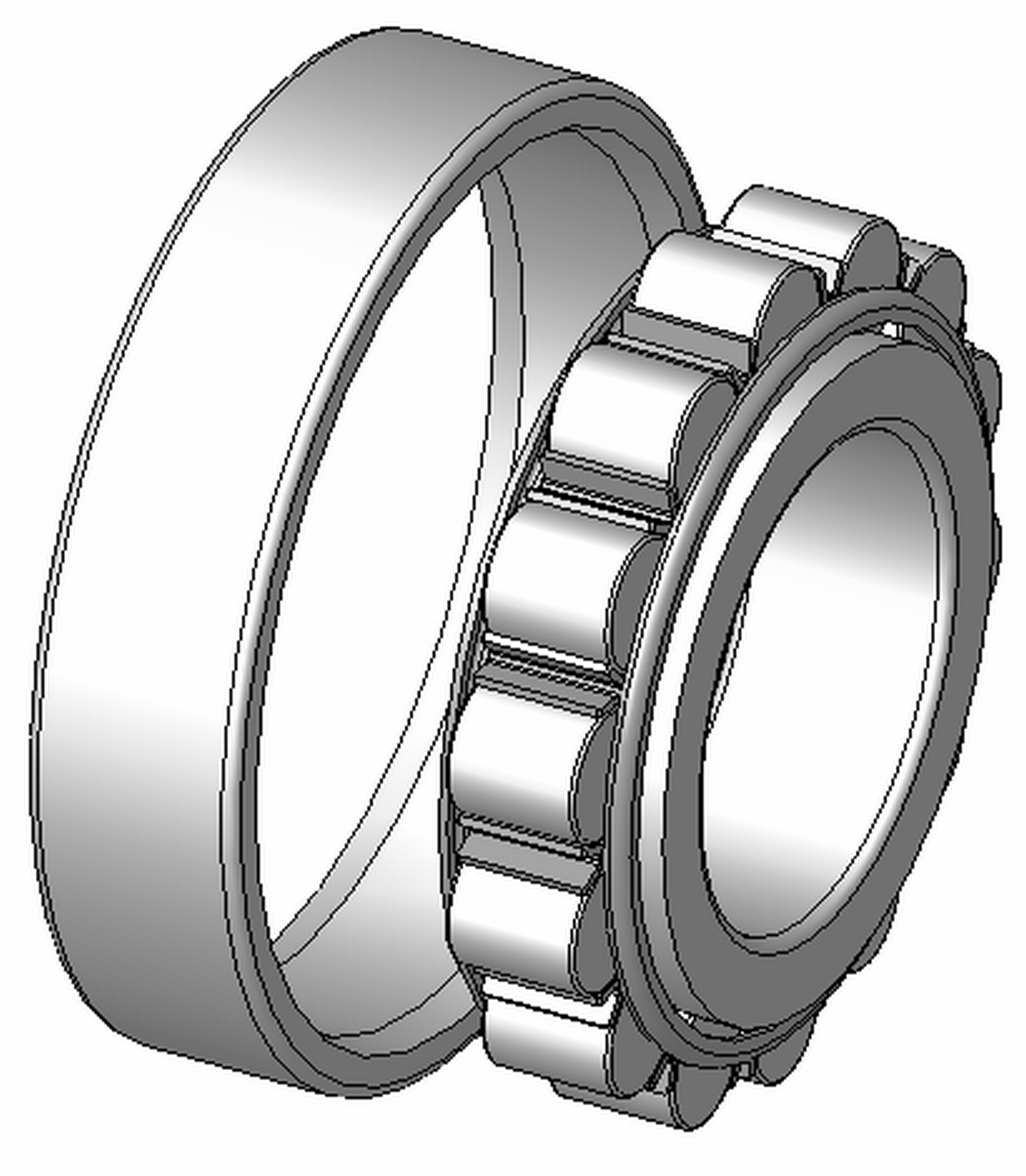
A cylindrical roller bearing. The circular ring is the race in which the rollers run.

The failed engine had run 2,793 hours of its 3,000-hour overhaul life. The subcommission found that the roller bearing that separated and supported the coaxial shafts of the high-pressure and low-pressure turbines had been designed to contain 26 rollers but contained only 13, a change made during the engine's manufacture. Three holes had also been drilled in the bearing's inner race to carry lubricant to the rollers. The holes created a stress concentration that, combined with the greater load on each of the fewer rollers, initiated fatigue failure of the bearing. The race and the rollers wore so badly that the bearing in effect became a plain bearing, and the shaft rotated eccentrically with a runout of about 1.3 mm (0.051 in). The resulting friction heated the shafts to at least 1,000 °C (1,830 °F), until the low-pressure turbine shaft broke.

Freed from its load but still driven by the exhaust gases from the combustion chambers, the low-pressure turbine accelerated within a few milliseconds to a critical speed and disintegrated. Part of the broken shaft and the first compressor stage fell out of the engine and were later found on the ground near the place where the failure occurred. Turbine fragments ejected at about 160 m/s (520 ft/s) penetrated the rear fuselage and damaged engine No. 1, setting it on fire. Fragments heated to 500–700 °C (932–1,292 °F), together with short circuits in the severed electrical wiring, started a fire in baggage hold No. 4. Because the damage had disabled the aircraft's warning systems, including the fire warnings, the crew was unaware that the fire in the hold was spreading. The reasons for the reduced number of rollers and the additional holes were not established. A 2008 documentary attributed the missing rollers to workers at the Soviet engine factory, who were said to have made the decision on their own.

=== Conclusions ===
The commission concluded that the primary cause of the accident was design and manufacturing defects in the D-30KU engine. It identified three contributing factors. The pitch control system lacked survivability, since the severing of a single push rod left the crew able to control the elevator only with its trim tab. Baggage hold No. 4, which lay in the plane of rotation of the engines' compressors and turbines, was inadequately protected against fire. The rear fuselage also contained flammable materials.

The commission found that the flight time back to Warsaw roughly matched the time needed to dump enough fuel for a safe landing. It also found that the crew's decision to continue to Okęcie rather than land at Modlin was based on Okęcie having the best firefighting and medical cover. The commission judged that, in an extremely complicated situation, the crew had acted rationally and with the aim of saving the passengers' lives. The prosecutor's office found that the crew's training and condition and the captain's decisions had been correct and had no causal connection with the accident. Maintenance, air traffic control and the weather were found to have played no part. The commission's report was made available to the institutions concerned and to the aircraft's manufacturer. The technical subcommission amended the Il-62M's operating instructions and issued 19 recommendations, 12 of which concerned the design of the engine and 6 the design of the airframe.

=== Soviet response ===
The Polish investigators encountered strong non-technical obstacles in their dealings with the Soviet side. A 79-page Soviet study from August 1987 argued that the fatigue damage to the bearing was a result rather than a cause of the accident. It justified the changes to the bearing by claiming that it had been poorly designed and could not work properly with the full number of rollers. The study did not explain why the engine had not been submitted for recertification after such a significant change. At Szałajda's initiative, two days of talks were held in the Kremlin, in which 39 Soviet representatives took part but were unable to refute the Polish evidence. On 25 November 1987, the deputy prime ministers of Poland and the Soviet Union signed a document committing to the implementation of the recommendations.

== Aftermath ==
=== Safety changes ===
Political conditions made it impossible for LOT to change its aircraft supplier, but the airline made technical and operational changes to its Il-62M fleet to improve safety. These included duplicating the control system in the rear of the aircraft, installing a more sensitive engine shaft vibration monitoring system, the Swiss Vibro-Meter EVW-219, with individual gauges and warning lights for each engine in the cockpit, using non-flammable materials in the baggage hold, and adding smoke detectors and an automatic Freon fire-extinguishing system to baggage hold No. 4. Engine oil was tested in a laboratory after every flight, and a small window was fitted in the door between the passenger cabin and the rear technical compartment, so that a fire could be fought if the door jammed.

On 5 October 1987, excessive shaft vibration led the crew of a LOT Tupolev Tu-154, which used the same engine type, to shut down an engine during a passenger flight from Warsaw to Milan. A similar incident occurred on 11 March 1990, on LOT Il-62 from Warsaw to Toronto. On 20 April 2008, a Cubana de Aviación Il-62M operating Flight 201 from Santo Domingo to Havana suffered an uncontained failure of its No. 2 engine at 25,000 ft (7,600 m). Debris damaged the No. 1 engine, causing a fire and a decompression, but the aircraft returned to Santo Domingo and landed safely with all 117 people on board unharmed.

=== Funerals and memorials ===
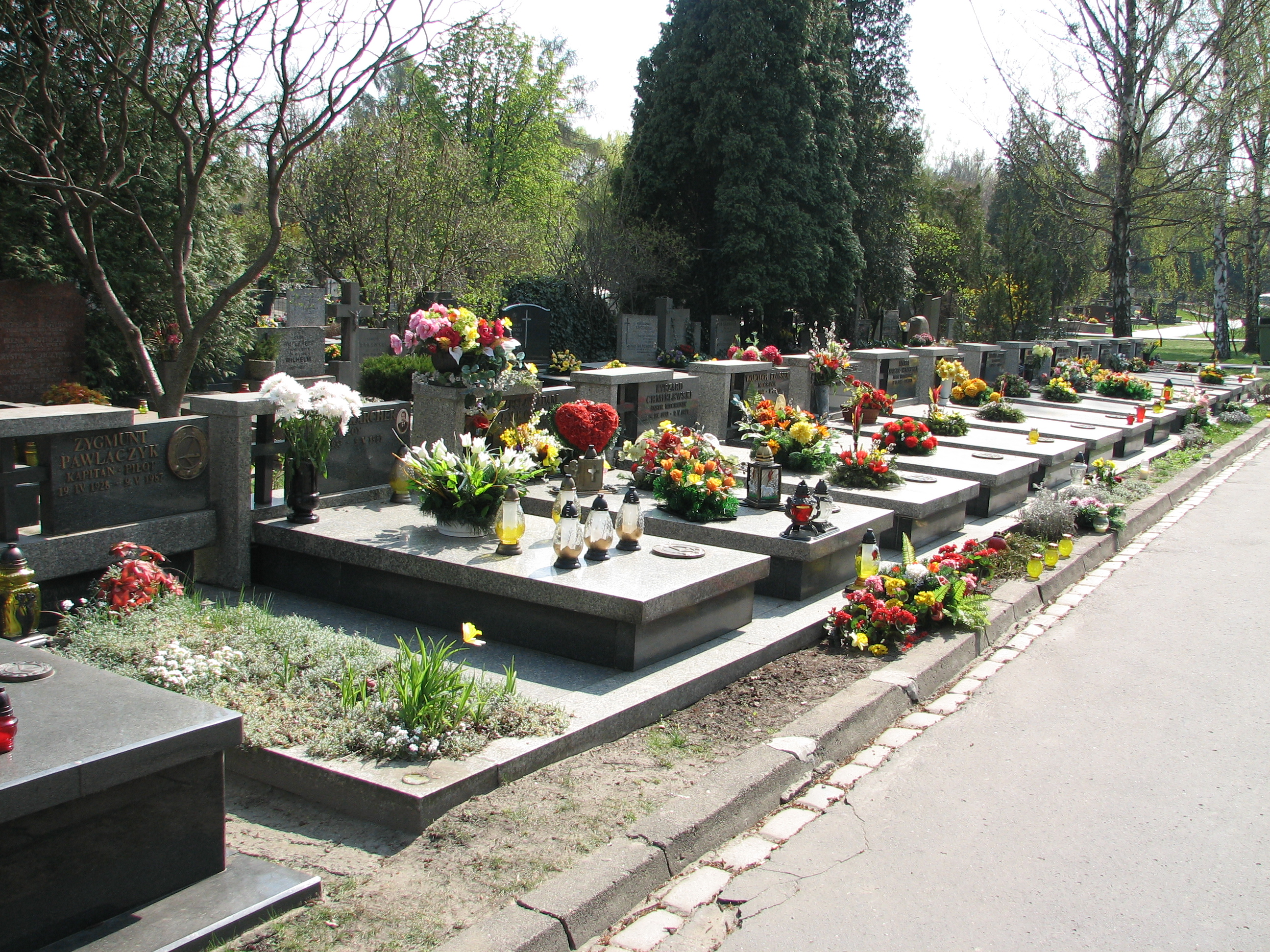
Graves of the crew at the Powązki Military Cemetery

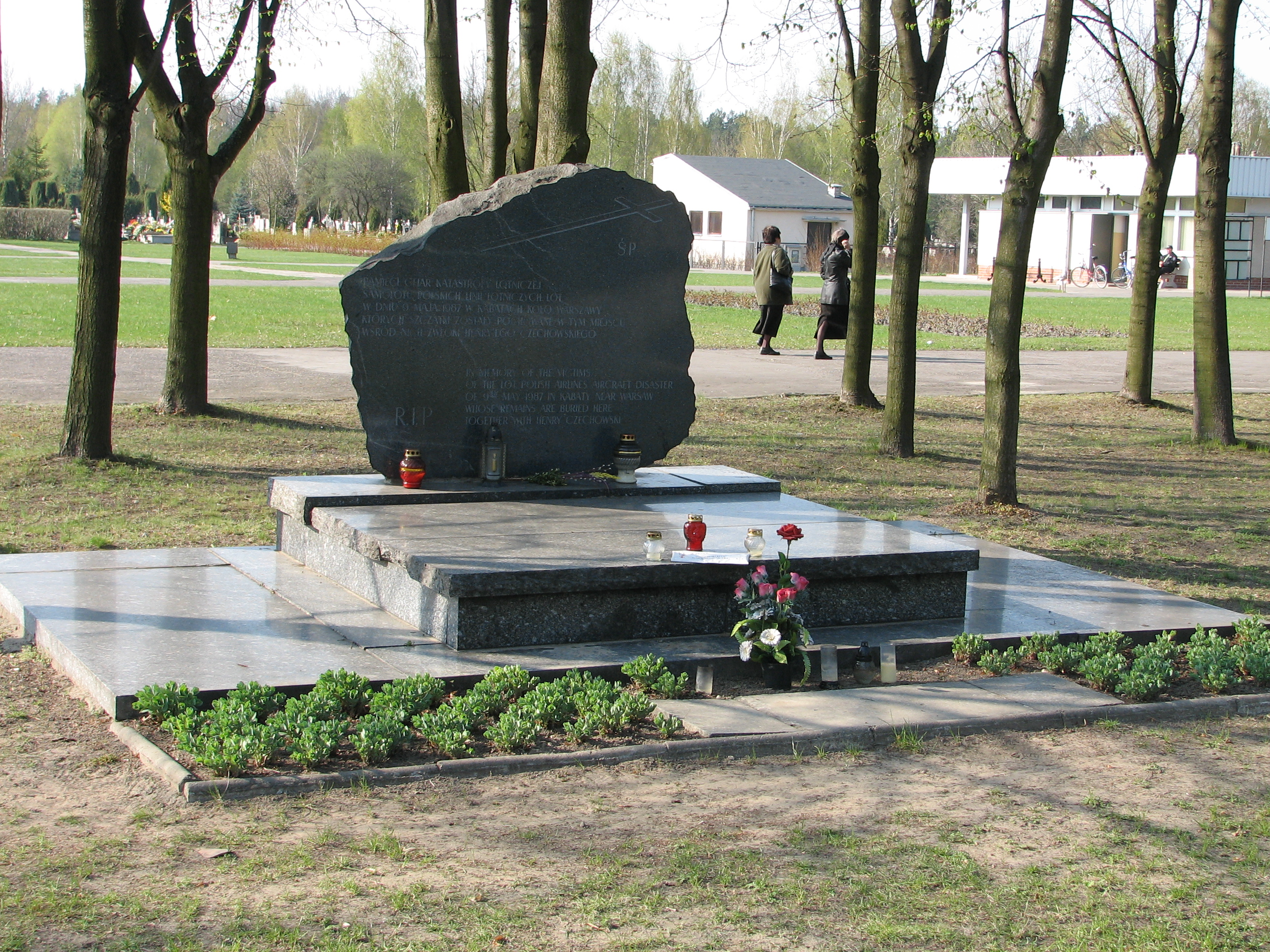
The common grave of the victims at the Northern Communal Cemetery in Warsaw

The Polish authorities expressed their condolences to the victims' families, and the Presidium of the Warsaw National Council declared 10 and 11 May 1987 days of mourning in the capital and in Warsaw Voivodeship. Condolences were sent by the leaders of many countries and by Pope John Paul II. On the sixth anniversary of the assassination attempt on John Paul II, a mass for the victims was celebrated in Warsaw Cathedral.

On 23 May 1987, the 15 LOT employees who had died, including the crew, were given a state funeral with military honours at what is now the Powązki Military Cemetery, attended by thousands of people, including Deputy Prime Minister Szałajda and other officials. The Council of State posthumously awarded the Officer's Cross of the Order of Polonia Restituta to Pawlaczyk, the Knight's Cross of the order to the other five members of the flight deck crew, and the Gold Cross of Merit to the five flight attendants. At his family's request, Pawlaczyk was buried in the family grave at Powązki Cemetery. The other LOT employees were buried side by side near the crew of LOT Polish Airlines Flight 007, which crashed in 1980. The passengers were buried in a common grave at the Northern Communal Cemetery in Warsaw, although some of the identified victims were buried by their families elsewhere, usually in their home towns. A street in Warsaw's Ursynów district is named after Pawlaczyk.

== In popular culture ==
Polish television documentaries about the accident include Podzwonne dla IŁ-a 62M ("A Knell for the Il-62M"), made by Telewizja Polska's military programmes department in 1991, two episodes of the TVP series Czarny serial ("Black Series") in 2000 and 2001, and an episode of the TVP series Miejsca przeklęte ("Cursed Places") in 2008. In 2008, Discovery Historia broadcast an episode of its series Historie lotnicze ("Aviation Stories") about the accident, and in 2012, TVN24 broadcast the documentary 50–55. In February 2013, Aleksander Sowa published a short story, Pół godziny Tadeusza Kościuszki ("Tadeusz Kościuszko's Half Hour"), based on the recordings of the crew's radio communications in the final minutes of the flight. An English translation followed in 2016.

== See also ==
- List of accidents and incidents involving commercial aircraft
- List of disasters in Poland by death toll
- LOT Polish Airlines Flight 007
- 1972 Königs Wusterhausen air disaster
- Air Algérie Flight 6289
- Dana Air Flight 992
- Baikal Airlines Flight 130
- United Airlines Flight 232
