= Interflug Flight 450 =

Fatal passenger plane crash in Schönefeld, East Germany

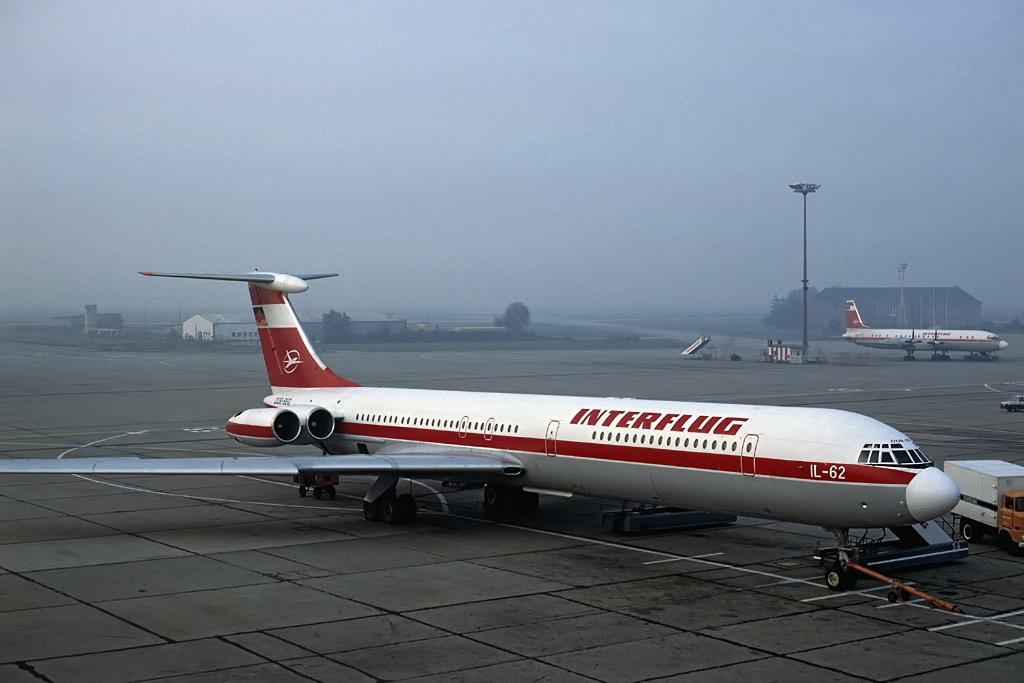
- An Interflug Il-62, similar to the one involved in the crash

Accident
- Date: 14 August 1972
- Summary: In-flight fire leading to mid-air breakup
- Site: Near Königs Wusterhausen, Bezirk Potsdam, East Germany; 52°18′23″N 13°41′19″E

Aircraft
- Aircraft type: Ilyushin Il-62
- Operator: Interflug
- IATA flight No.: IF450
- ICAO flight No.: IFL450
- Call sign: INTERFLUG 450
- Registration: DM-SEA
- Flight origin: Berlin-Schönefeld Airport, Schönefeld, East Germany
- Destination: Burgas Airport, Burgas, Bulgaria
- Occupants: 156
- Passengers: 145
- Crew: 11
- Fatalities: 156
- Survivors: 0

Interflug Flight 450 was a holiday charter flight to Burgas, Bulgaria operated by an Ilyushin Il-62 that crashed shortly after take-off from Berlin-Schönefeld Airport in Schönefeld, East Germany, on 14 August 1972. The accident was caused by a fire in the aft cargo bay which spread quickly, destroying the aircraft's structural integrity. All 156 passengers and crew died. To this day, it is the deadliest aviation accident to occur on German soil and the third deadliest accident involving an Ilyushin Il-62.

== Aircraft and crew ==
The aircraft was an Il-62 registered DM-SEA, with serial number 00702. It was the first Il-62 delivered to Interflug and entered service in April 1970. It was handed over to the airline to mark the centenary of the birth of Vladimir Lenin. By the time of the accident, it had flown about 3,520 hours.

The captain, Heinz Pfaff, aged 51, had joined the East German Deutsche Lufthansa in 1956 and remained with the airline when it was merged into Interflug in 1963. He had flown the Aero 45, the Ilyushin Il-14 and the Ilyushin Il-18, and had flown the Il-62 since its introduction at Interflug in 1970. He had about 8,100 flight hours and had flown more than four million kilometres. The first officer, Lothar Walther, aged 35, had been with Interflug since 1961 and had 6,041 flight hours. The navigator, Achim Filenius, aged 38, had joined Deutsche Lufthansa in 1955 and had 8,570 flight hours. He had survived an air crash near Königsbrück in 1963. The flight engineer, Ingolf Stein, aged 32, had been with Interflug since 1963 and had 2,258 flight hours. The cabin crew consisted of four flight attendants.

== Accident ==
Flight 450 was a holiday flight from Berlin-Schönefeld to Burgas, on Bulgaria's Black Sea coast, with 148 passengers on board. The aircraft took off at 16:29 local time. At about 16:43, while flying at an altitude of about 8,900 m (29,200 ft) south-east of Cottbus, about 100 km (62 mi) from Berlin, the crew noticed problems with the trim of the horizontal stabiliser. A minute later, after consulting air traffic control, the crew turned back towards Schönefeld. At 16:51, the crew decided to dump five tonnes of fuel to avoid an overweight landing, and dumping began three minutes later. The aircraft then turned left towards the Hotel Mike radio beacon south of Storkow, which it passed shortly afterwards.

At 16:59, the crew made a final distress call, reporting increasing problems with pitch control: "Mayday, Mayday, Mayday. Impossible to hold altitude, we had a fire, we are having difficulty with the elevator control." As the aircraft continued to descend, the rear fuselage, carrying the horizontal and vertical stabilisers, separated from the aircraft, which lost all stability and control. The aircraft pitched over, and the resulting aerodynamic loads tore off part of the forward fuselage and parts of the wings in the air. The wreckage struck the ground at 17:01, 400 to 600 m (1,300 to 2,000 ft) east of the edge of Königs Wusterhausen. All 156 people on board were killed.

According to a 2022 article in the Frankfurter Allgemeine Zeitung, an emergency landing at the nearer airfield at Cottbus might have saved many lives. The article suggests that Pfaff, an experienced captain, probably did not attempt it because the crew could not have known how serious the situation was.

== Investigation and aftermath ==
The East German aviation inspectorate, the criminal police and the Ministry for State Security investigated the accident in detail, and their files are preserved in the German Federal Archives. Interflug's Il-62s were grounded during the investigation. In the Il-62, an inaccessible space outside the pressurised cabin in the tail contained ducts that carried hot, pressurised bleed air at 300 °C (572 °F) from the engines to the air-conditioning system. A leak in these ducts damaged the insulation of nearby electrical cables, causing a short circuit with arcing that ignited magnesium alloys in the structure at temperatures of up to 2,000 °C (3,630 °F). The damaged cables had already caused the trim problems shortly after take-off. Sparks started a fire in the rear cargo area, where flammable de-icing fluid was stored and also caught fire. At the time, the Il-62 had no fire detectors in the tail section, and there was no view from the cabin into the rear compartment, so the crew did not notice the fire and was unaware of the extent of the problem. The fire weakened the tail section until it separated from the fuselage together with the entire tail unit. The investigating commission concluded that leaking hot-air ducts in the unpressurised tail section had caused the crash, which made it the result of a design flaw. The Ilyushin design bureau, whose general designer Genrikh Novozhilov took part in the investigation, never confirmed this finding. Out of consideration for the Soviet Union, the East German authorities never officially announced the cause.

The Il-62 was nevertheless modified in line with the commission's proposals, with additional fire detectors, fire-extinguishing equipment and a viewing window in the partition to the tail compartment. Additional periodic inspections, known as "special air-conditioning checks", were also introduced. No further problems of this kind occurred in Interflug's later operation of the Il-62.

== Memorials ==
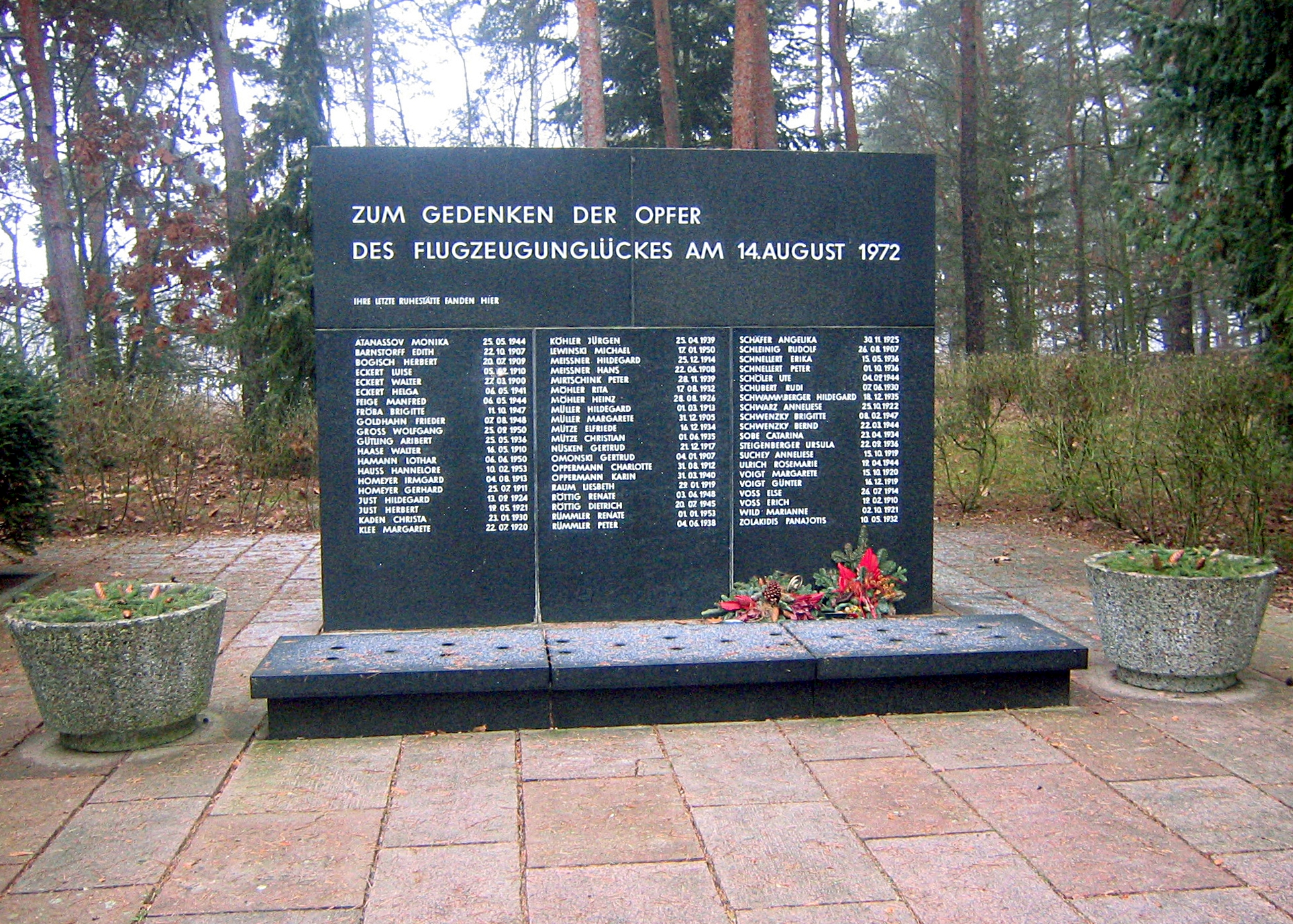
Memorial at the cemetery in Wildau

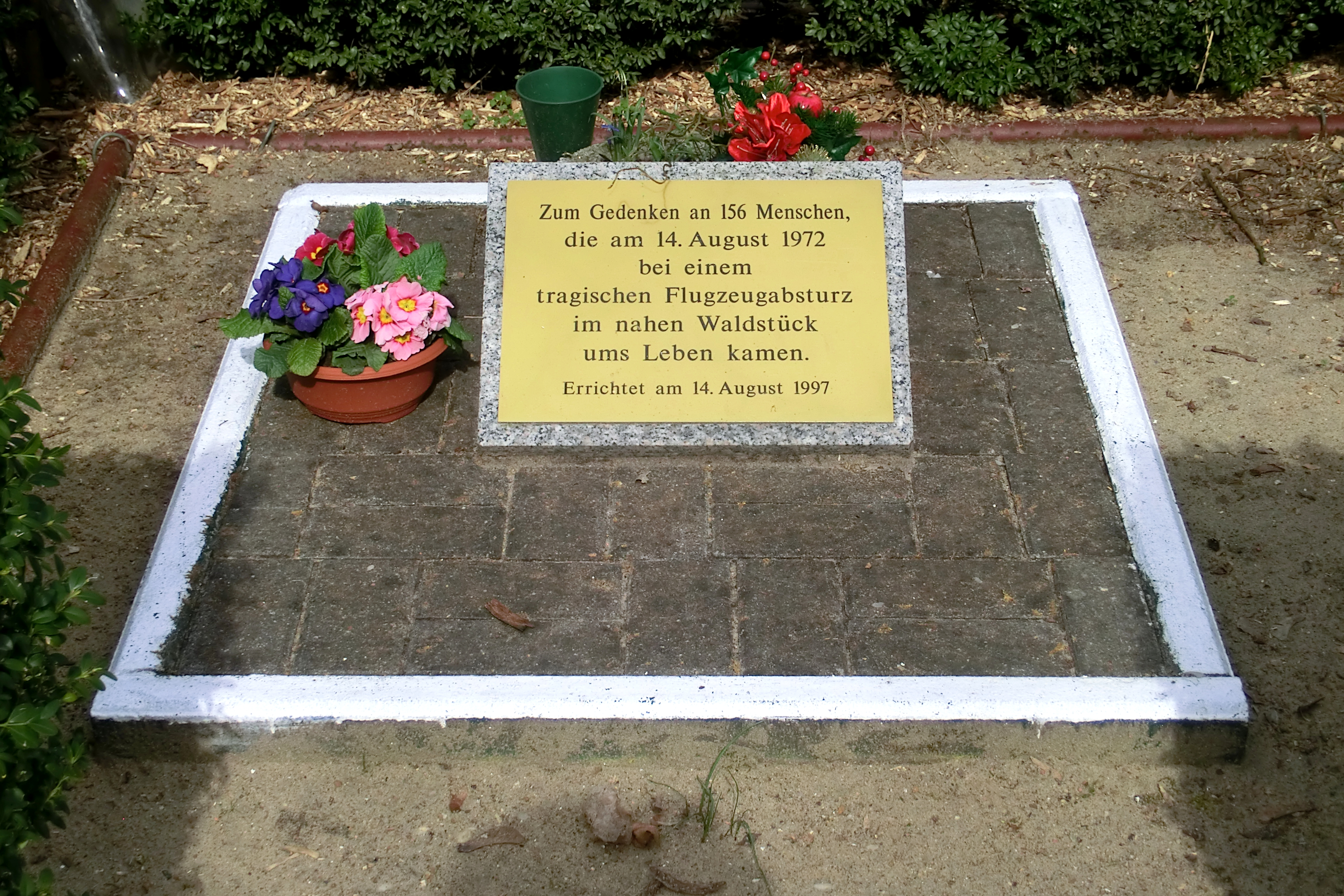
Memorial plaque in Königs Wusterhausen

The 60 victims who could not be identified were buried in a common grave at the cemetery in Wildau, in the district of Hoherlehme, marked by a memorial stone bearing their names. The other victims were buried in their home towns. The first public commemoration of the disaster was held on its 40th anniversary in 2012. A memorial stone near the crash site was created on the private initiative of a local eyewitness, and a new memorial plaque was unveiled at the site on the 50th anniversary in 2022. In August 2024, a street in Königs Wusterhausen, Am Wasserwerk, was renamed Heinz-Pfaff-Straße in honour of the captain, whose actions were credited with preventing the aircraft from crashing into a residential area.

== In popular culture ==
The disaster was the subject of Der Todesflug der IL 62 ("The Death Flight of the Il-62"), a 1998 documentary by Jens Stubenrauch and Titus Richter in the Mitteldeutscher Rundfunk series Vergessene Katastrophen ("Forgotten Disasters"). It was also covered in a 2022 episode of the German podcast Flugforensik.

== See also ==
- LOT Polish Airlines Flight 5055
- Mexicana de Aviación Flight 940
- South African Airways Flight 295
- Swissair Flight 111
