= Zygmunt Pawlaczyk =

Polish pilot

- Born: April 19, 1928; Skalmierzyce, Poland
- Died: May 9, 1987 (aged 59); Warsaw, Poland
- Cause of death: Airline disaster in the Kabaty Woods
- Resting place: Powązki Cemetery
- Occupation: Pilot
- Employer: LOT Polish Airlines
- Spouse: Alina Pawlaczyk
- Children: Jacek Pawlaczyk
- Honours: Order of Polonia Restituta

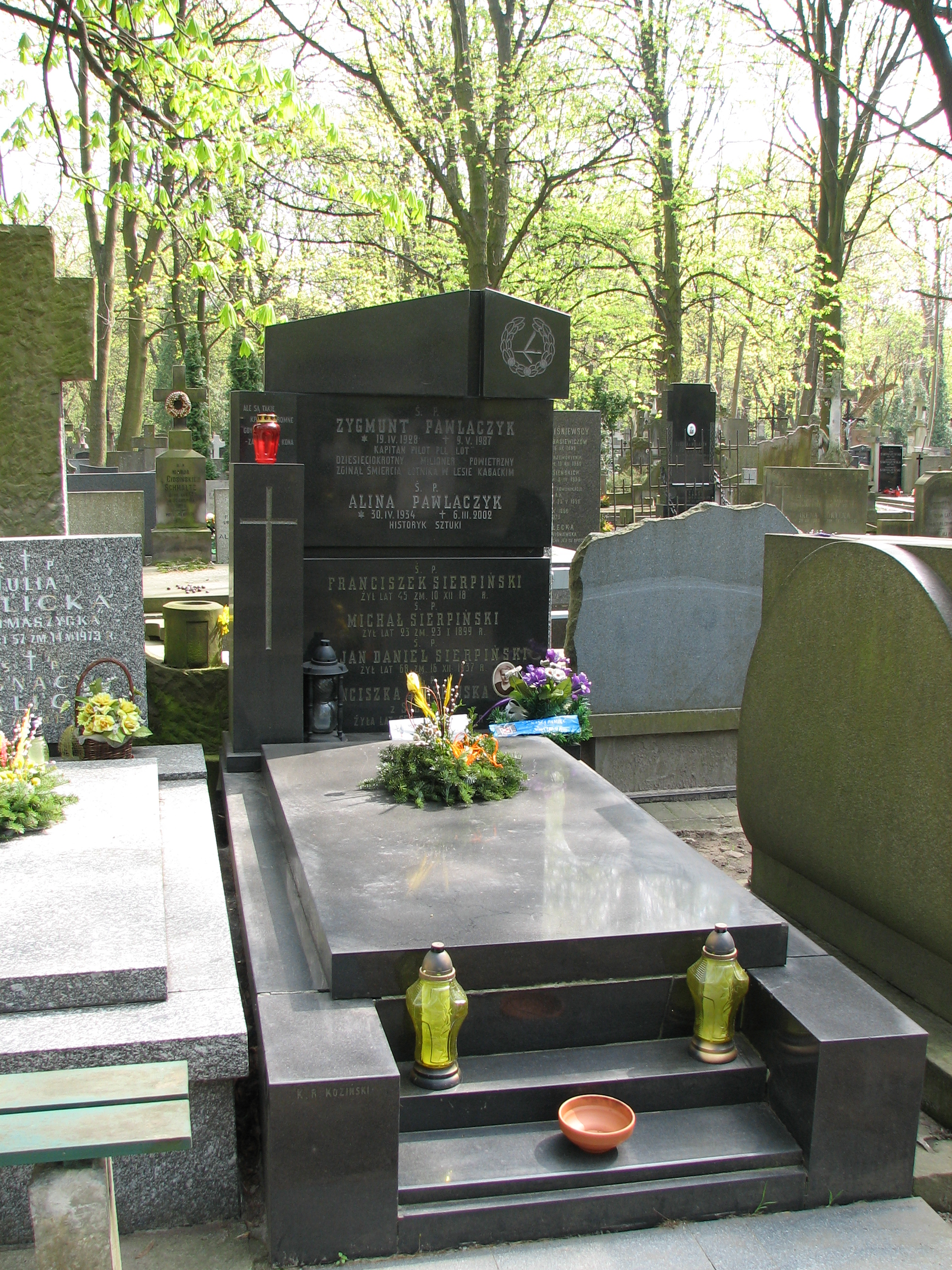
Grave of Zygmunt Pawlaczyk and his wife Alina at the Powązki Cemetery

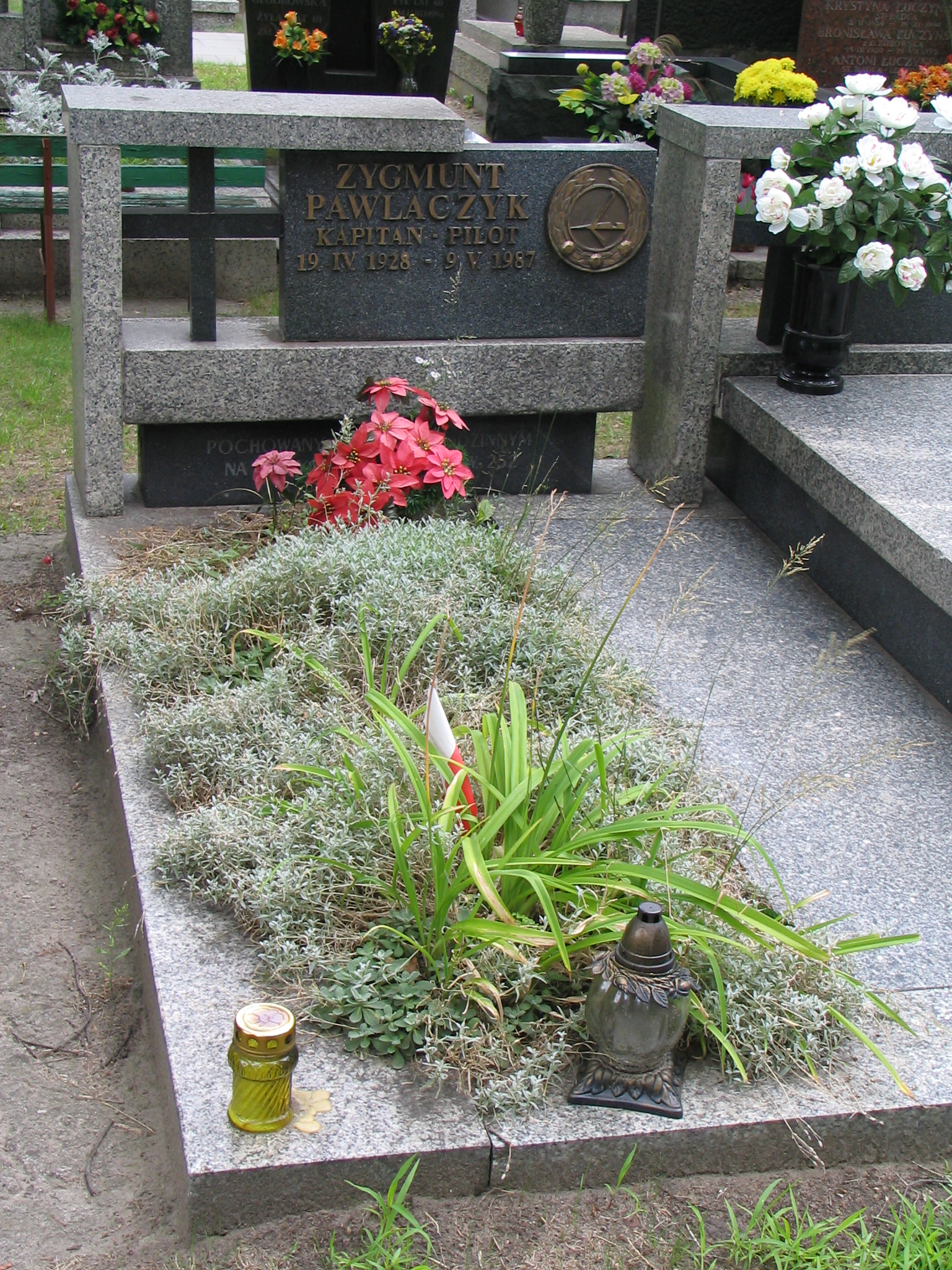
Symbolic grave of Zygmunt Pawlaczyk at the Powązki Military Cemetery

Zygmunt Pawlaczyk (19 April 1928 – 9 May 1987) was a Polish pilot. A military pilot since 1951, he began flying for LOT Polish Airlines in 1955. He was the captain of the Il-62M SP-LBG Tadeusz Kościuszko passenger aircraft flying LOT Polish Airlines Flight 5055, which crashed while attempting an emergency landing on 9 May 1987 in the deadliest incident in the history of Polish aviation.

== Biography ==
=== Youth ===
Until 1949, Zygmunt Pawlaczyk lived with his parents in Jarocin. During the occupation, he was forcibly conscripted to work at the Thönet furniture factory in 1942. After the war, he took part in an operation to remove weapons from German military transports together with his friends. In later years, he continued to work at the furniture factory, and in the evenings he completed elementary school and a three-year vocational school in Jarocin. In his free time, he organized lectures, informal talks, sports competitions, and amateur performances with his friends.

=== Military service and pilot career ===
In 1949, he was drafted into military service in Wrocław and subsequently assigned to a driving school in Warsaw, which he graduated from in 1951, ranking first in his class. He was then assigned to Jelenia Góra, where he served as a driver at a unit headquarters. From there, he was sent to a military pilot training course, which he completed with a very good grade. In the early 1950s, he obtained his license to fly Po-2 biplanes. In 1955, he began working for LOT Polish Airlines, and after completing another course, he became a civilian pilot. He participated in a forest spraying operation in Bulgaria in 1956, for which he received the Udarnik badge.

Milestones in aviation qualifications:

- 1956 – sports pilot licence for all multi-engine aircraft,
- 1957 – qualifications for Li-2 series aircraft,
- 1958 – qualifications for Il-14 series aircraft,
- 1960 – Class I aviation navigator licence and flight engineer licence,
- 1963 – qualifications to command the Il-14 and an air traffic radio,
- 1966 – qualifications for Il-18 series aircraft,
- 1975 – qualifications for Il-62 series aircraft,
- 1978 – qualifications to command the Il-62.

He logged 19,745 flight hours, including 5,542 hours on Il-62 aircraft; as captain of Il-62 and Il-62M aircraft, he logged 3,725 hours from 11 May 1978. He covered over 10 million km in the air.

=== Air disaster ===
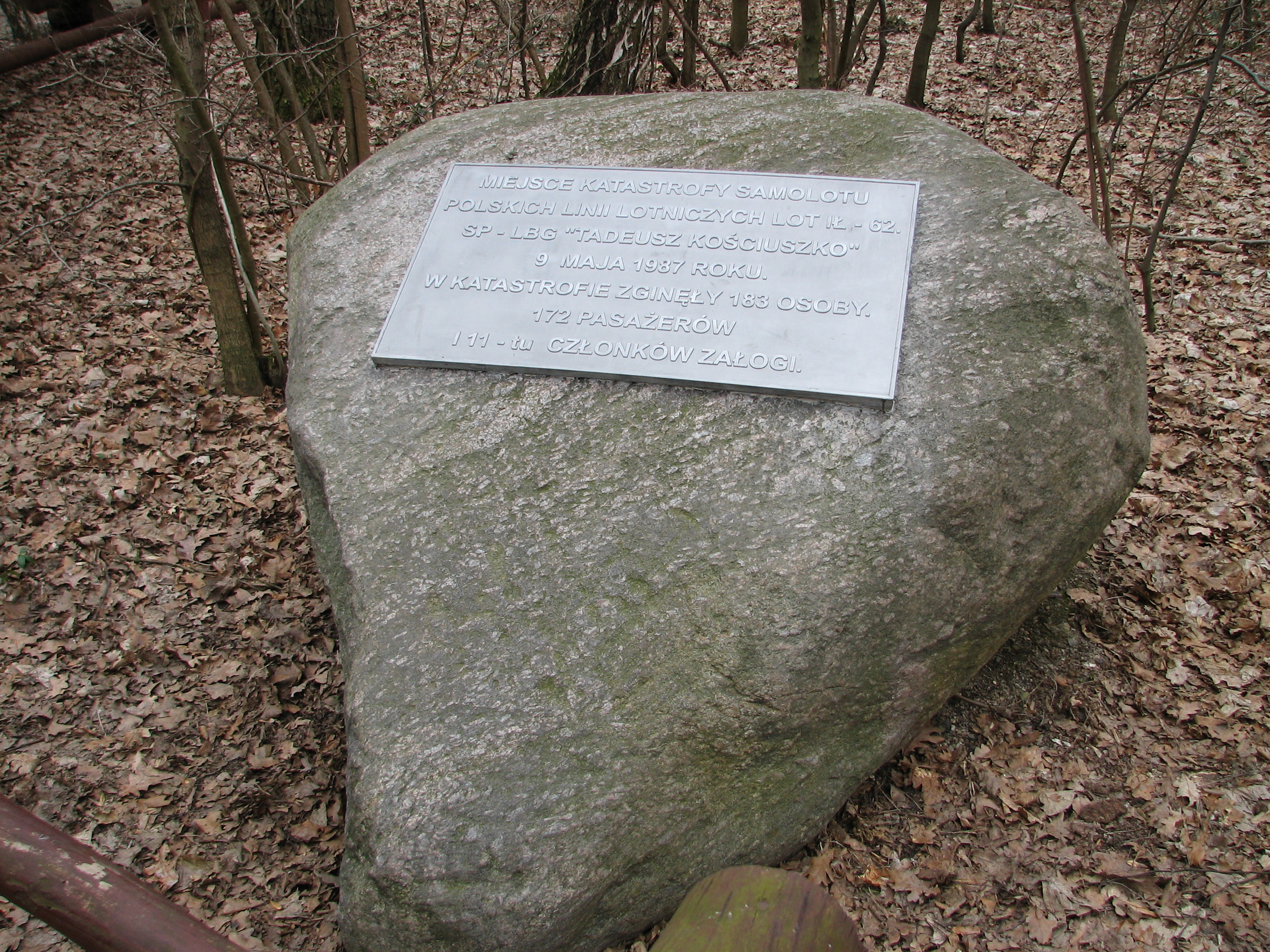
Boulder commemorating the crash of the Il-62M SP-LBG Tadeusz Kościuszko

Captain Pawlaczyk was the commander of the crew of the Tadeusz Kościuszko aircraft, which crashed during the disaster in the Kabaty Woods on 9 May 1987. The commission investigating the causes of the crash concluded that, despite the highly complicated situation in which the aircraft's crew found itself, their actions were rational and aimed at saving the passengers' lives, and the decisions made by Zygmunt Pawlaczyk under extremely difficult conditions were correct and had no causal connection to the crash.

The last recorded words – attributed to Captain Pawlaczyk – "Goodbye, we're dying" (Polish: Cześć, giniemy) have become a symbol of this disaster. They are also the title of Jarosław Reszka's book, which deals with the greatest disasters in Poland in the 20th century. A street and a square in Warsaw's Ursynów district (Natolin) are named after Captain Zygmunt Pawlaczyk.

He was survived by his wife Alina and son Jacek, who worked for LOT Polish Airlines. A symbolic grave for Zygmunt Pawlaczyk is located at the Powązki Military Cemetery in Warsaw, but he was in fact buried in the family plot at the Powązki Cemetery (plot 251-6-5).

== Awards and decorations ==
- Officer's Cross of the Order of Polonia Restituta (posthumously)
- First Class Badge with Three Diamonds for Distinguished Service to LOT Polish Airlines (posthumously)

== See also ==
- LOT Polish Airlines Flight 5055
