= Płońsk Memorial House =

- Dom Pamięci w Płońsku
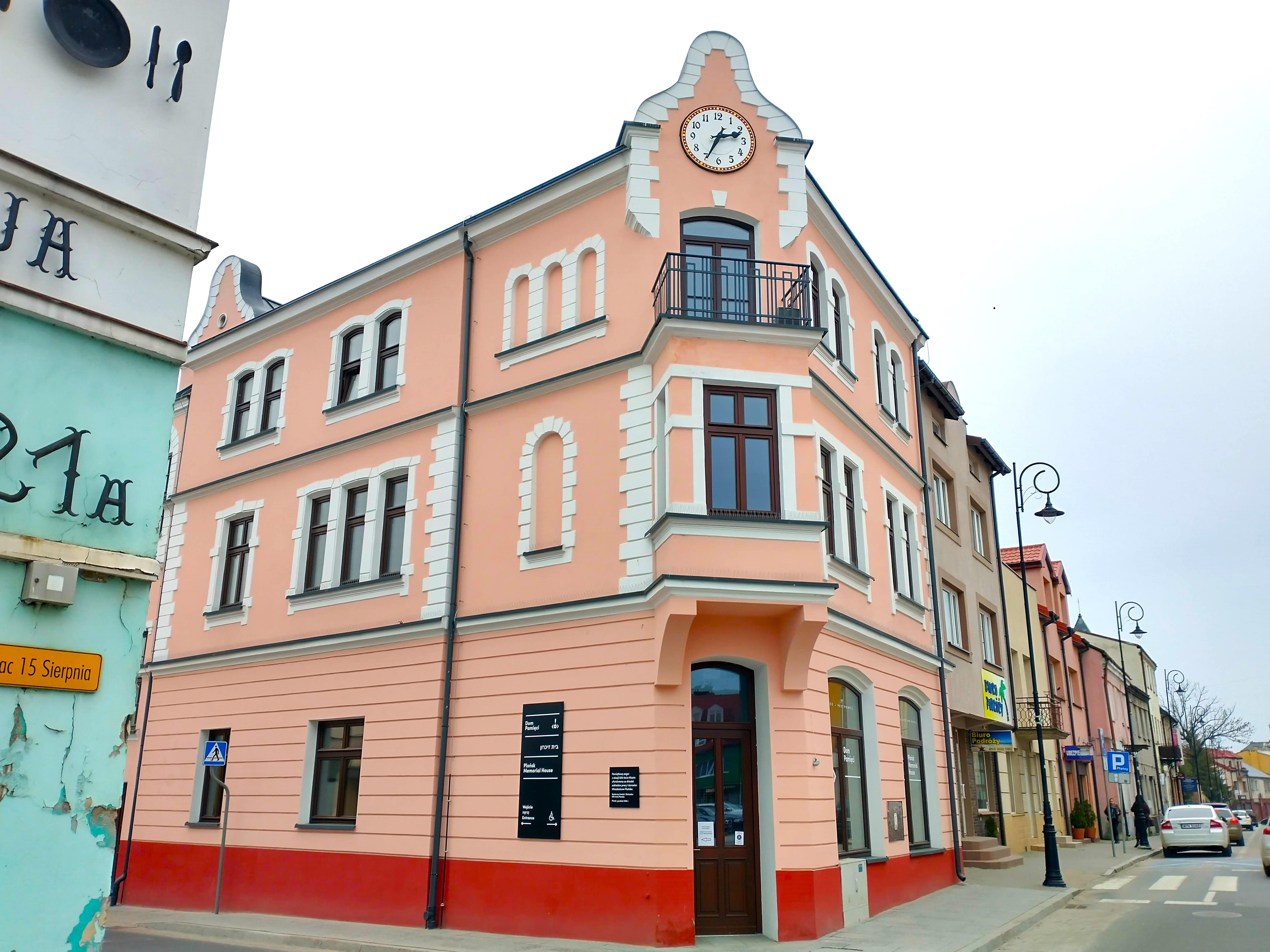

- Location within Poland
- Established: 2023
- Location: Warszawska 2, Płońsk, Poland
- Coordinates: 52.62282226720689°N 20.375279004723996°E
- Type: Jewish museum
- Website: dompamieciplonsk.pl/en/strona-glowna-english/

The Płońsk Memorial House (Polish: Dom Pamięci w Płońsku) is a museum in Płońsk commemorating the history of two nations that have coexisted in one town for nearly 500 years – Polish and Jewish. It was established in October 2023 in the house at 2 Warszawska Street, opposite the David Ben-Gurion’s family home, who was born in Płońsk. The permanent exhibition "Glance and recall" in the Memorial House shows the history of the Jewish community of Płońsk and the Holocaust, as well as of Ben-Gurion himself.
