= Płońsk =

Place in Masovian Voivodeship, Poland

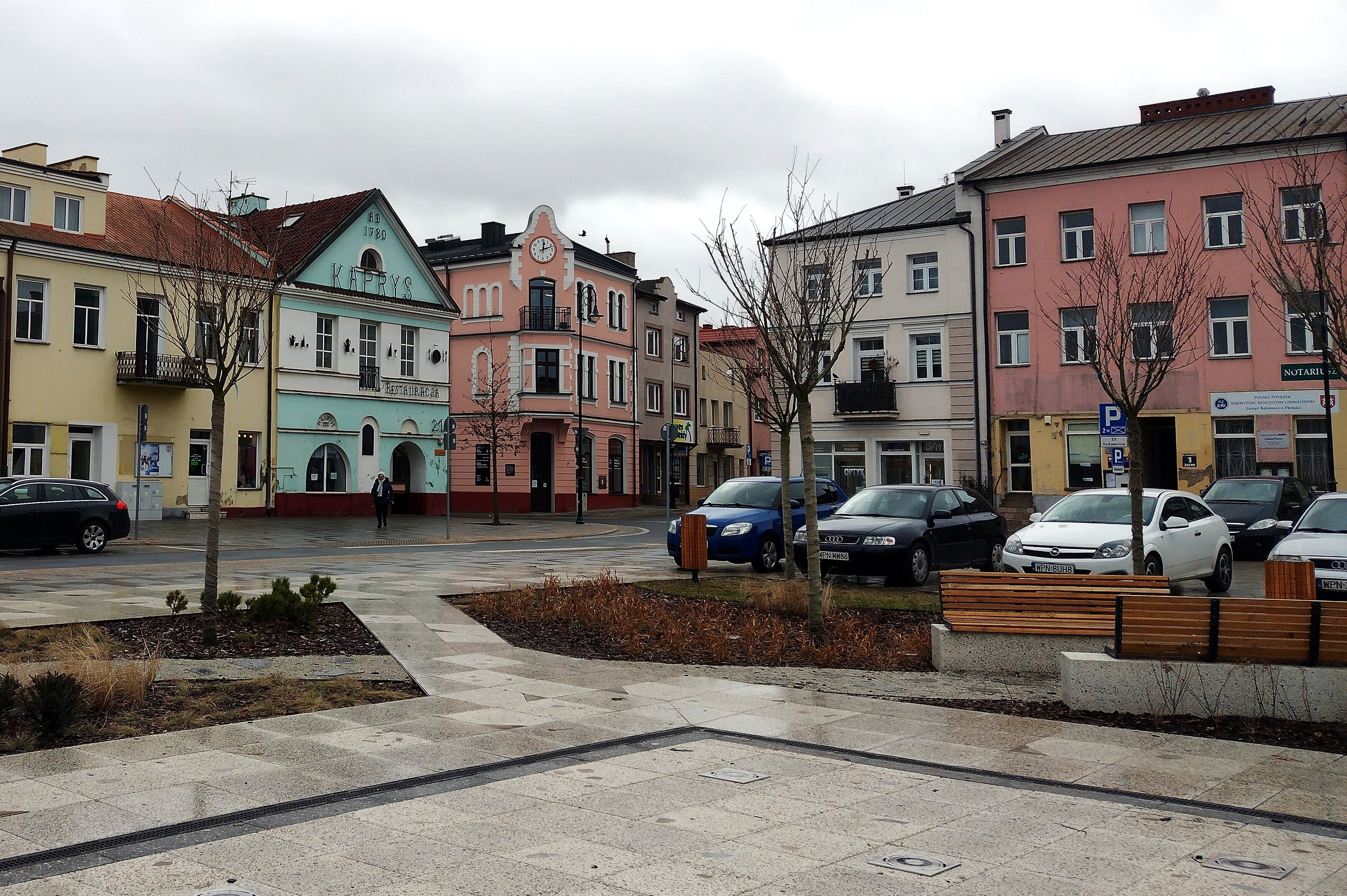
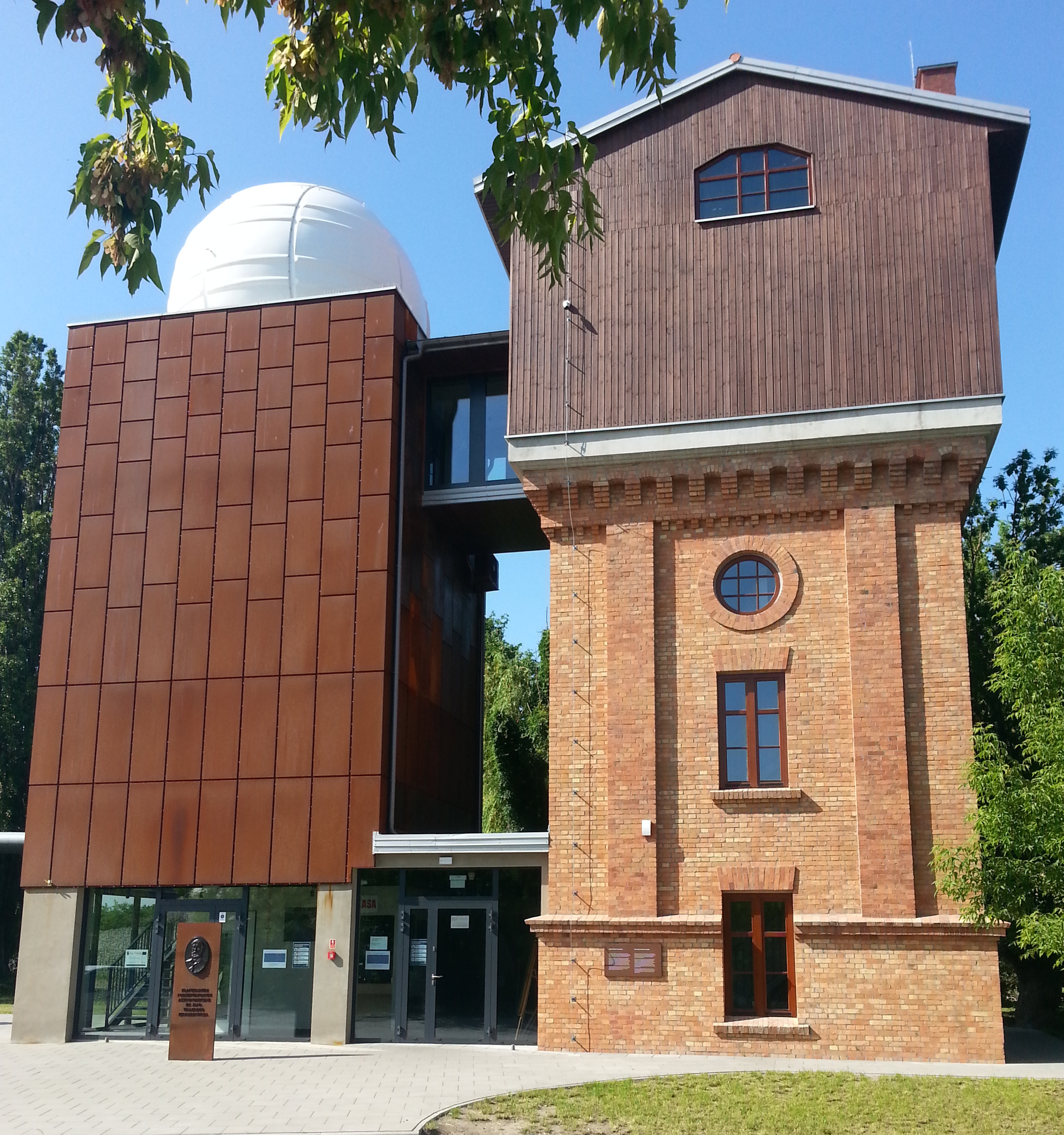
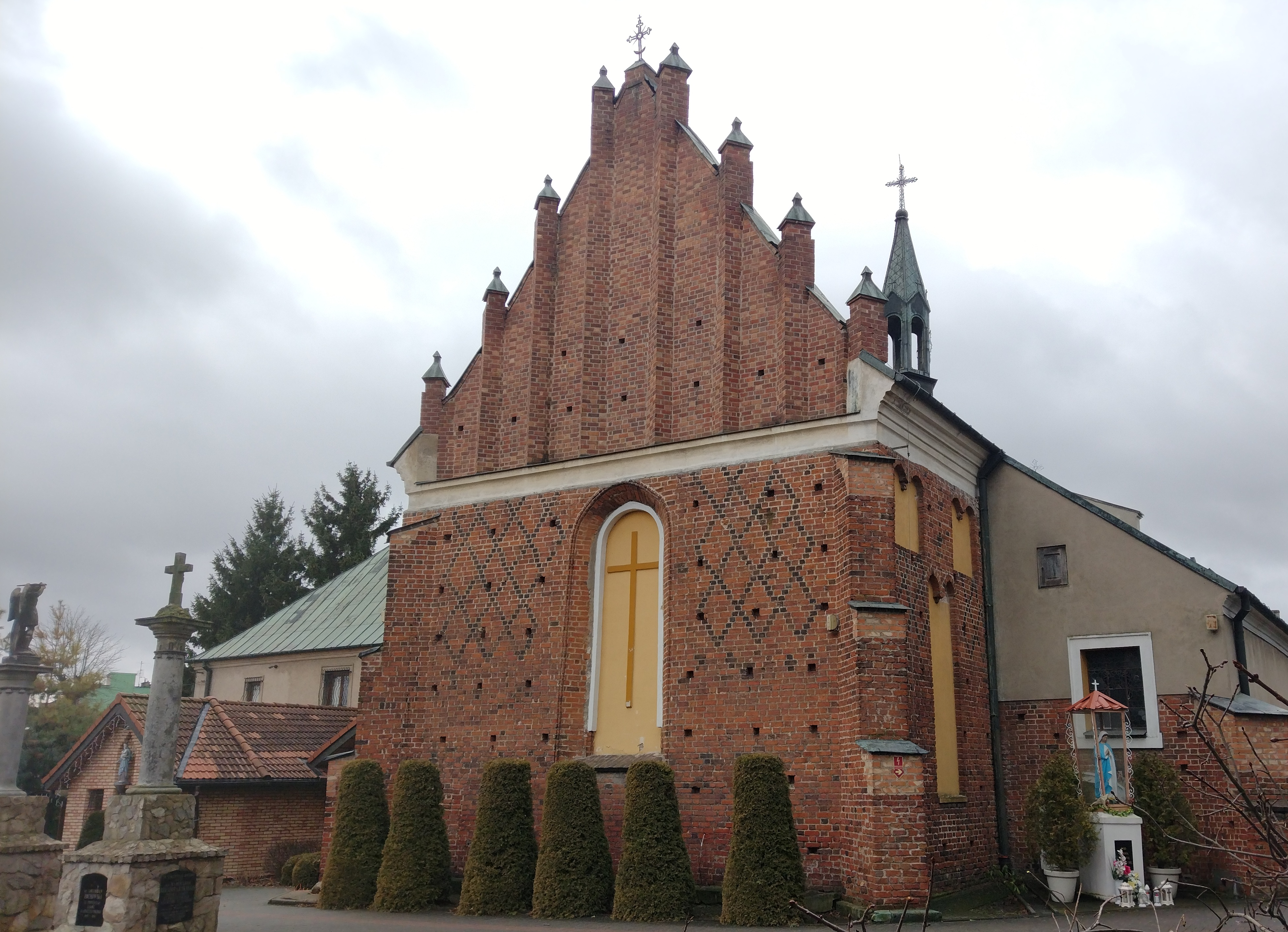
- From top, left to right: Market Square; Planetarium; St. Michael Archangel church

- Flag Coat of arms

- Location within Poland
- Coordinates: 52°37′23″N 20°22′14″E
- Country: Poland
- Voivodeship: Masovian
- County: Płońsk
- Gmina: Płońsk (urban gmina)
- Established: 10th century
- Town rights: 1400

Government
  - Mayor: Andrzej Józef Pietrasik

Area
  - Total: 11.6 km^{2} (4.5 sq mi)

Population (2022-12-31)
  - Total: 21,591
  - Density: 1,860/km^{2} (4,820/sq mi)
- Time zone: UTC+1 (CET)
  - Summer (DST): UTC+2 (CEST)
- Postal code: 09-100
- Area code: +48 023
- Car plates: WPN
- Website: http://www.plonsk.pl

Płońsk (Polish: [pwɔj̃sk] is a town in central Poland with 21,591 inhabitants (2022). Situated at the Płonka river in the historic region of Mazovia, it is the seat of Płońsk County in the Masovian Voivodeship.

== History ==
According to archaeological research, the Płońsk stronghold was built in the late 10th century within the early Polish state. Dating back to 1155, is the first historical record confirming the existence of Płońsk. Around the castle a group of inhabitants was formed, most of whom initially worked on the land. As a result of the fragmentation of medieval Piast-ruled Poland, it was part of the duchies of Masovia and Płock, and then it was a royal town of the Polish Crown, administratively located in the Płock Voivodeship in the Greater Poland Province. In 1400, Siemowit IV of Masovia, granted it town rights under Chełmno law, then merchants and craftsmen started to come to the town. Płońsk was located on a trade route connecting Toruń with Brześć.

In 1872–1875 astronomer Jan Walery Jędrzejewicz established an astronomical observatory and meteorological station in Płońsk. After his death, the astronomical observatory was moved to Warsaw in 1898.

It was a centre of the garment industry. The Jews lived mostly within the city, whilst the Poles were more scattered and tended to live in the countryside. On 16 October 1886 David Ben-Gurion was born in Płońsk. Like him, also many other Jewish residents of the city immigrated to Palestine for Zionist reasons, spurred on by the idea of building a Jewish homeland.

On 14–17 August 1920, the Poles successfully defended the town during a Soviet invasion. According to the 1921 Polish census, the town had a population of 9,220, 58.1% Polish and 41.9% Jewish.

During the joint German-Soviet invasion of Poland, which started World War II in September 1939, Germany invaded the town and the Einsatzgruppe V entered the town to commit various crimes against the populace. Under German occupation the town was annexed directly to Nazi Germany and was renamed Plöhnen. The Germans established and operated a court prison in the town. In 1940, the occupiers expelled around 1,000 Poles, whose houses and workshops were then handed over to German colonists as part of the Lebensraum policy. In September 1940, Jews from the town and the surrounding areas were imprisoned in a ghetto. Soon a typhus epidemic broke out. A hospital, a bathhouse for the sick, a pharmacy, and a folk kitchen were organized in the ghetto. In total, 12,000 Jews were prisoners of the ghetto and from October 1942, they were sent to the Auschwitz extermination camp. In 1943 in Berlin, the Germans sentenced six members of the local Polish resistance movement, some to death. On 16–18 January 1945, shortly before retreating, the German police carried out a massacre of 78 Poles in the town.

The town was administratively part of the Ciechanów Voivodeship from 1975 to 1998.

In 2008, the Płońsk Association of Astronomy Enthusiasts was founded, and in 2024 the Jan Walery Jędrzejewicz Planetarium and Astronomical Observatory in Płońsk was opened.

== Sights ==
- Saint Michael Archangel Church – former monastery of Calced Carmelites, founded before 1417 by the Duke Siemowit IV of Masovia and his wife Aleksandra, sister of Polish King Władysław II Jagiełło
- David Ben Gurion’s family home – 18th century tenement house at 21A 15 Sierpnia Square, where Ben Gurion lived until his emigration to Palestine in 1908
- The Memorial House at 2 Warszawska Street – the museum of Płońsk's Jews
- David Ben Gurion Square – monument on a place where he was born
- The old Sienkiewiczówka manor – home of Polish novelist and Nobel Prize laureate Henryk Sienkiewicz, located in the Poświętne district. There he wrote his first unpublished novel Ofiara.
- Former house of 19th-century Polish astronomer Jan Walery Jędrzejewicz
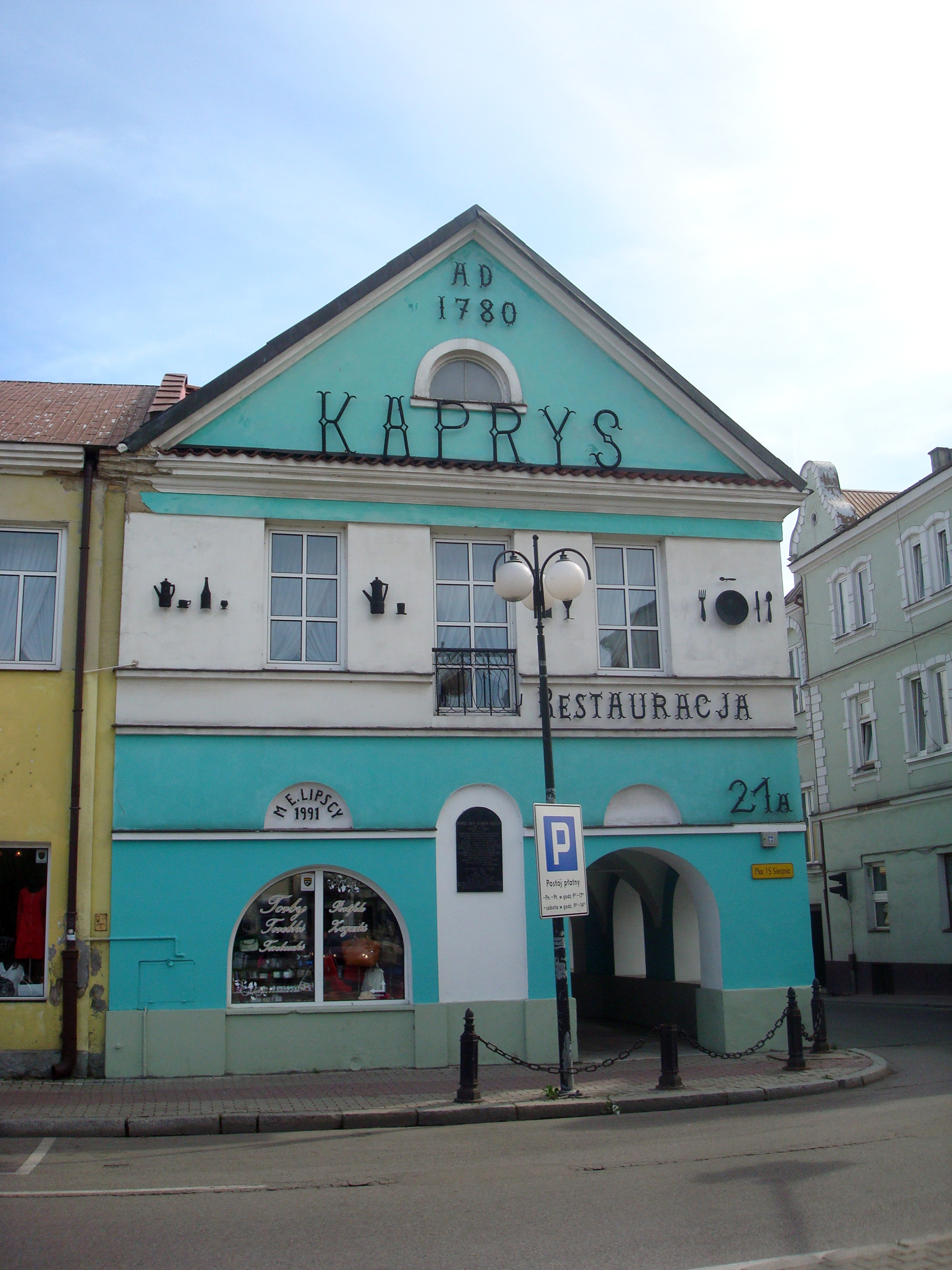
David Ben Gurion’s family home

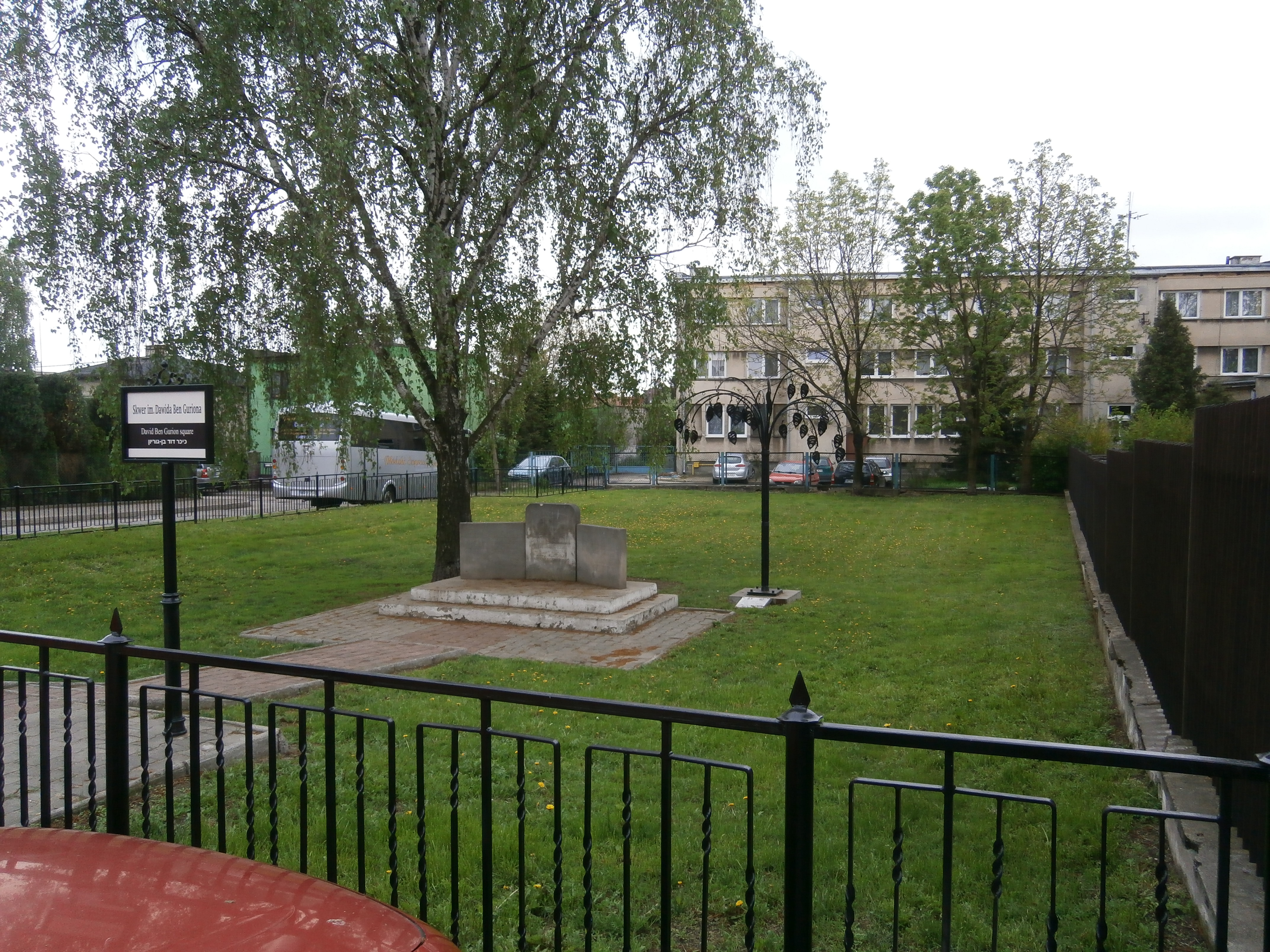
David Ben Gurion Square

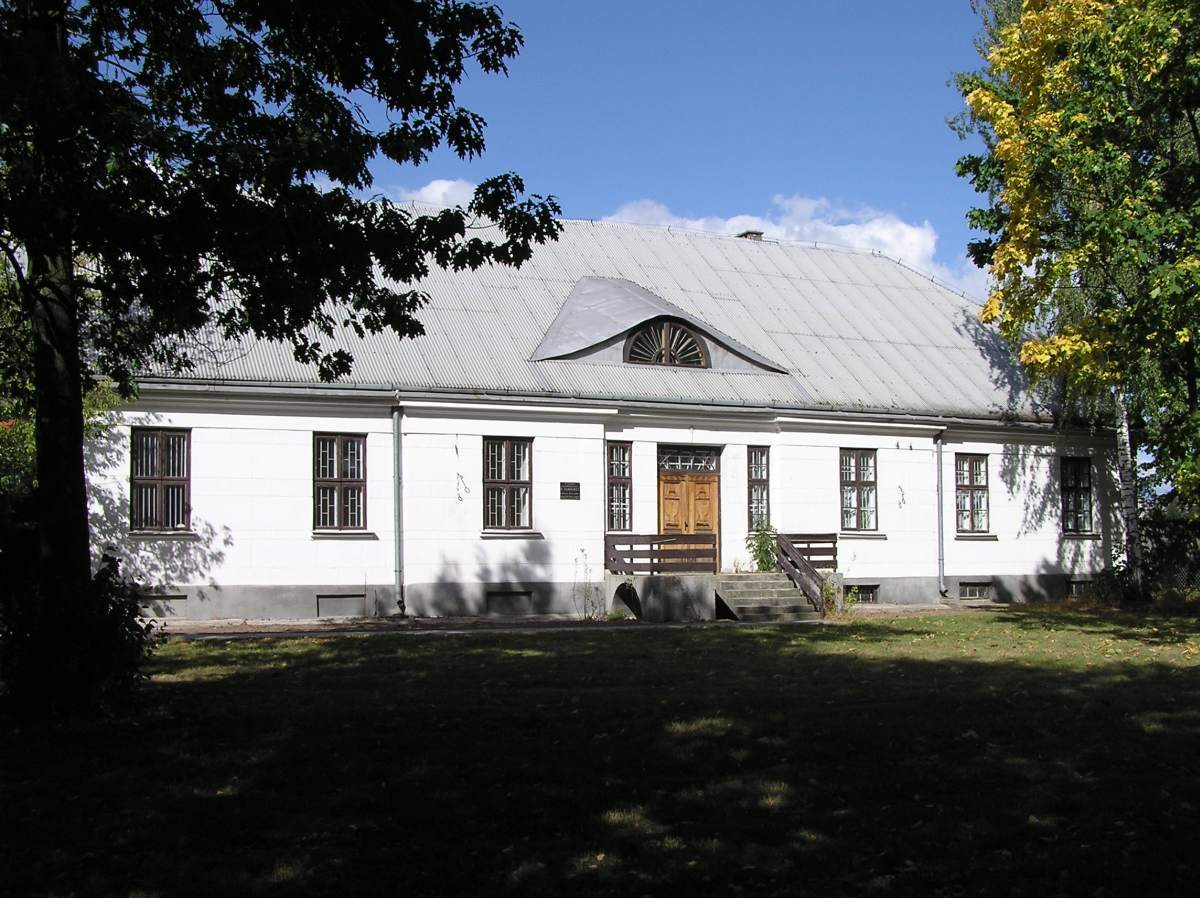
Manor in the Poświętne district, home of Polish novelist and Nobel Prize laureate Henryk Sienkiewicz in the 1860s

== Demographics ==
Historical population

Year	Pop.	±%
1910	12,302	—
1921	9,220	−25.1%
1931	10,393	+12.7%
1939	12,000	+15.5%

Year	Pop.	±%
1950	8,223	−31.5%
1960	10,086	+22.7%
2010	22,486	+122.9%

== Museums ==
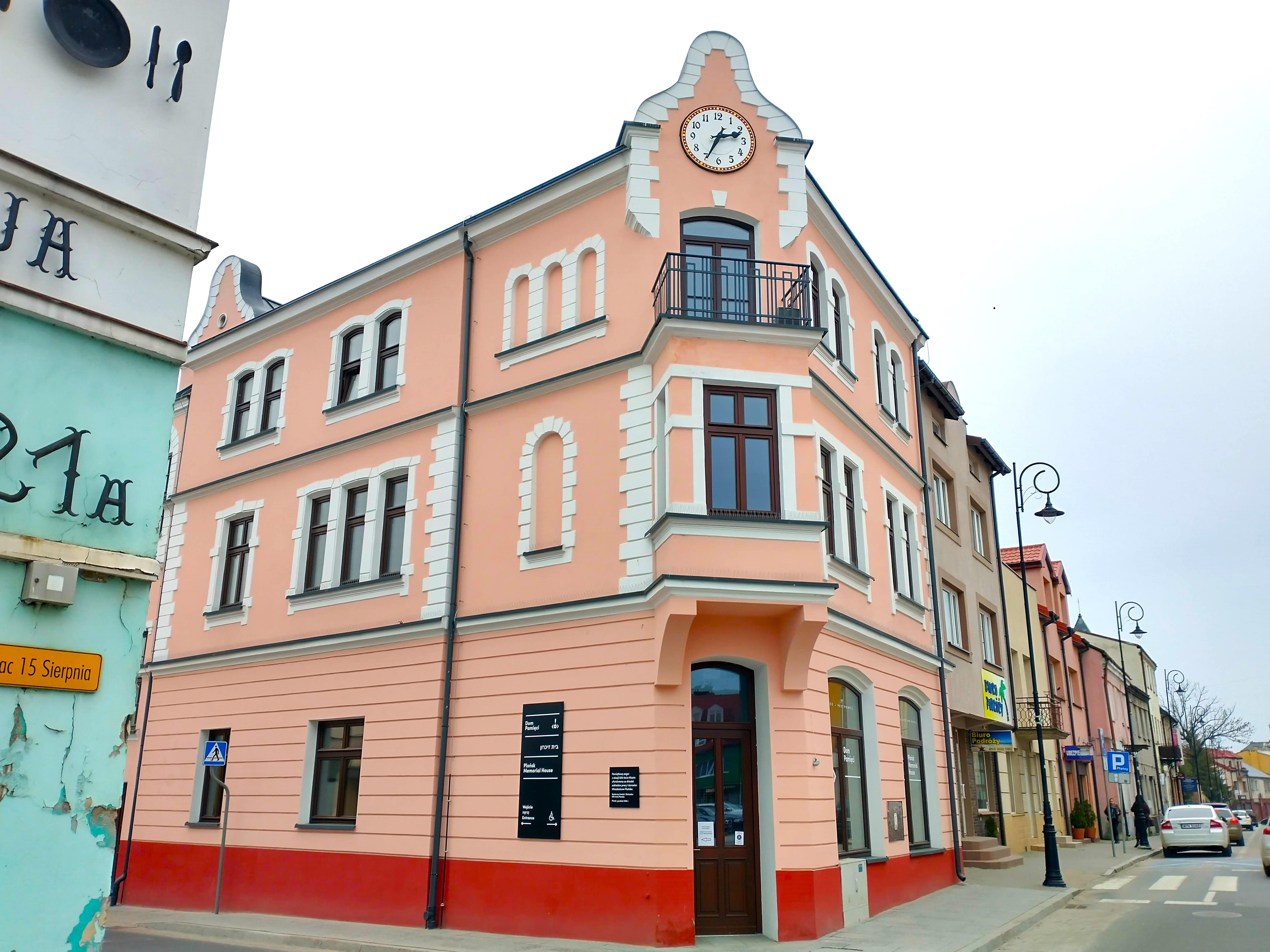
Płońsk Memorial House

- Płońsk Memorial House - museum with permanent exhibition "Glance and recall" showing the history of the Jewish community of Płońsk, of the Holocaust and of David Ben-Gurion
- Muzeum Ziemi Płońskiej - local history museum being created at the railway station, which opened in spring 2024

== Transport ==
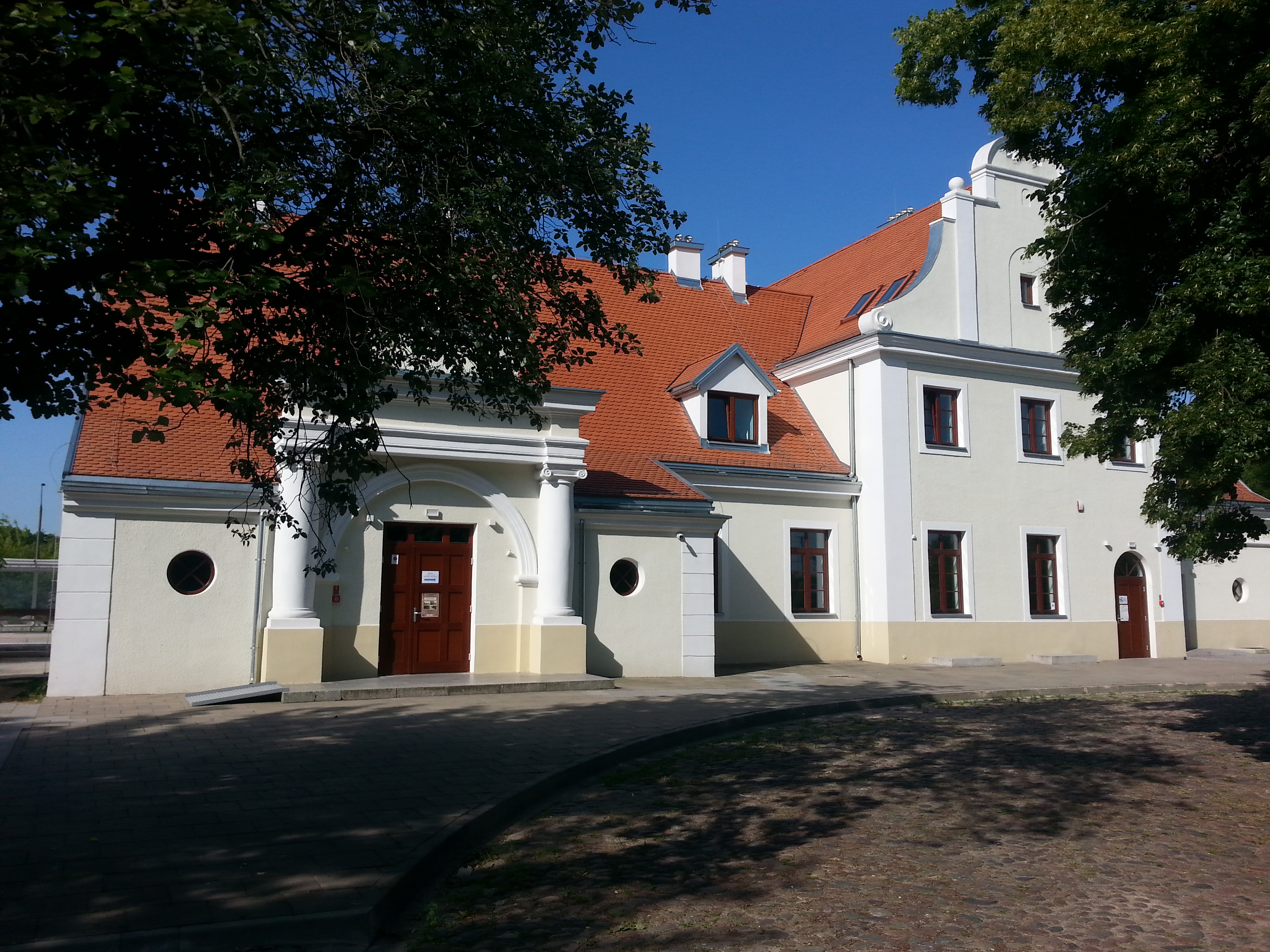
Railway station

Płońsk is located at the intersection of the Polish S7 highway (partly under construction as of February 2022) and National roads No. 10 and 50. There is also a railway station in the town.

== Events ==
- Memoriał Andrzeja Trochanowskiego – one-day cycling race based in Płońsk, which takes place annually on 1 May
- Jewish Culture Festival – held annually in October or November

In 2018, local Poles held a celebration in honor of David Ben-Gurion, who was born in the town, for the 70th anniversary of the re-establishment of the State of Israel.

== Notable people ==
- Henryk Sienkiewicz (1846–1916), novelist and journalist, Nobel Prize laureate
- David Ben-Gurion (1886–1973), the first Prime Minister of Israel
- Joanna Mucha (born 1976), from 2011 to 2012 Minister of Sport and Tourism of Poland
- Tomasz Majewski (born 1981), Polish shot putter and a double Olympic gold medalist
