= List of transportation fires =

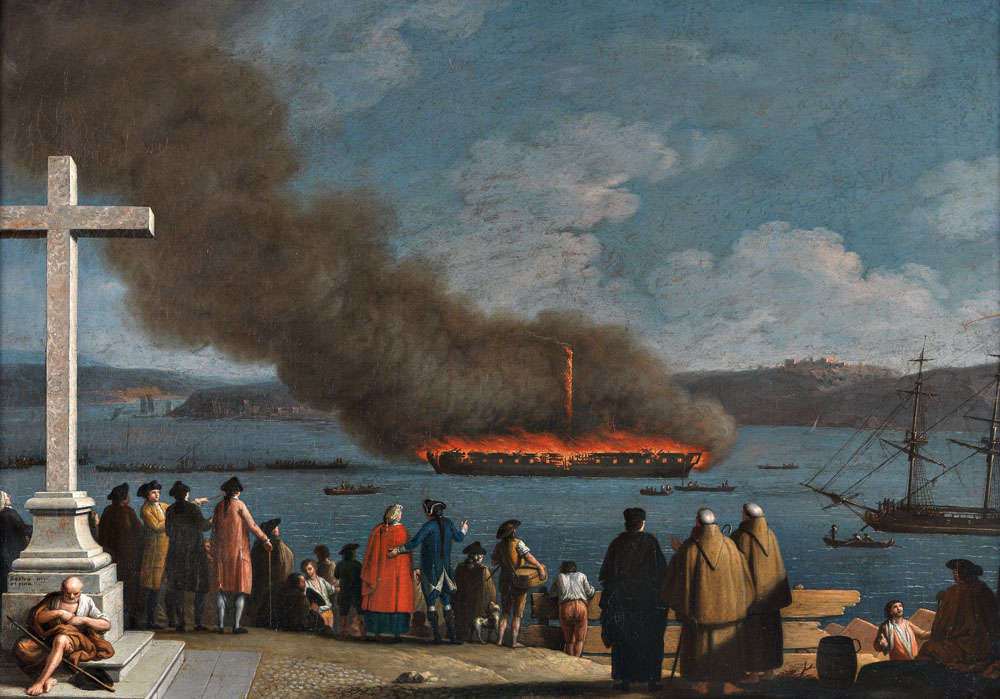
The Portuguese frigate Graça Divina e São João Baptista ablaze on the Tagus, in 1771

This is a list of transportation fires where a ship, train, truck, plane or some other kind of transportation caught on fire.

The following is a list of transportation fires.

== Ship fires ==
- 1800 – British warship HMS Queen Charlotte — 673 deaths
- 1807 – The slave ship Ann — some 100 deaths
- 1840 – Steamship Lexington in Long Island Sound — 139 deaths
- 1850 – Sailing ship Richard Cobden (1845 ship) in the Indian Ocean – no deaths
- 1865 – Sultana on the Mississippi River, near Memphis, Tennessee — 1,547 deaths
- 1893 – Cargo ship Cabo Machichaco in Santander, Spain — 590 deaths
- 1904 – Steamship General Slocum in New York City — 1,021 deaths
- 1906 – Hankow fire in Hong Kong — 130+ deaths (14 October)
- 1908 – Sardinia in Malta — at least 118 deaths
- 1913 – Volturno burned at sea, later scuttled — 135 deaths
- 1917 – Munitions ship Mont-Blanc burned, drifted and detonated in the Halifax Explosion — roughly 2,000 deaths
- 1924 – City of Singapore at Port Adelaide — 3 deaths, 13 injured
- 1934 – Morro Castle off Asbury Park, New Jersey — 137 deaths, ship gutted and beached
- 1941 – Attack on Pearl Harbor, sinking USS Arizona (BB-39) and several other ships; extensive fires generated aboard and around ships
- 1942 – Normandie in New York City, ship capsized and sank at pier
- 1944 – Bombay Explosion (1944) — Fort Stikine docked in Bombay, India underwent a fire which caused two explosions and set fire to the area killing around 800 people
- 1944 – Port Chicago disaster — E. A. Bryan docked in Port Chicago, California underwent massive explosions and fire while munitions were loaded. 320 people were killed and 390 were injured.
- 1947 – Texas City disaster — two ships' cargoes of ammonium nitrate caught fire and exploded, killing 581, more than 5,000 injured.
- 1947 – Xi'an in Hong Kong — 200 deaths
- 1949 – Noronic in Toronto, Ontario Canada — 118 to 139 deaths
- 1958 – Artemis - after collision at Hoek van Holland, port of Rotterdam
- 1963 – Lakonia near Madeira burned — 128 deaths
- 1965 – Yarmouth Castle near Nassau, Bahamas — 90 deaths
- 1965 – Orient Trader in Toronto, Ontario, Canada — no deaths or injuries. Was towed from pier into harbour and totally destroyed by fire.
- 1967 – USS Forrestal in the Gulf of Tonkin — 134 deaths.
- 1972 – STV Royston Grange — Collided at Río de la Plata with Tien Chee, a tanker carrying 20 000 tons of crude oil. – 83 deaths
- 1972 – RMS Queen Elizabeth in Hong Kong, ship sank in harbour
- 1980 – Leonardo da Vinci, capsized and burned for three days
- 1985 – Chidambaram off the Malabar coast of India — 34 deaths.
- 1987 – Doña Paz in the Philippines — an estimated 4,000 deaths
- 1989 – Princess of Scandinavia, fire broke out on board during a crossing to Harwich
- 1990 – Scandinavian Star off Norway — 159 deaths
- 1991 – Moby Prince disaster in Livorno, Italy. 140 killed.
- 1994 – Achille Lauro near Somalia
- 2001 – Windoc in Allanburg, Ontario, Canada — Bridge lowered on the ship, this tore off the wheelhouse and funnel and caused a fire that burned out the aft cabins and engine room. No deaths.
- 2006 – Star Princess in the Caribbean — one death
- 2007 – Cutty Sark, 19th-century clipper in dry dock as a museum ship in Greenwich, London, extensively damaged while undergoing restoration on May 21
- 2011 – Nordlys, Norwegian cruise ship, September 15, two deaths
- 2014 – Norman Atlantic in Strait of Otranto, Greece — 12 deaths confirmed (including two rescue crew members who died indirectly), 18 others believed dead.
- 2019 – MV Conception, dive boat in California's Channel Islands – 34 deaths.
- 2020 – New Diamond about 65 kilometres (35 nmi) east of Sri Lanka in the Sangaman Kanda Point - 1 death
- 2021 – MV X-Press Pearl anchored 9.5 nautical miles (17.6 km; 10.9 mi) off Colombo Port in Sri Lanka
- 2022 – Superyacht Princess in Torquay, sank in harbour
- 2023 – Port Newark disaster, cargo ship catches fire in Newark, New Jersey — 2 firefighters killed.
- 2023 – Fremantle Highway caught fire off the coast of the Dutch island of Ameland around 11.45 pm (CET) on 25 July 2023 while en route from Bremerhaven, Germany, due to arrive in Egypt's Port Said on 2 August 2023.

== Train and rail fires ==
- 1866 – Welwyn Tunnel rail crash in Hertfordshire, England causes a major fire in the tunnel, killing 2 on June 9
- 1903 – Paris Métro train fire kills 84
- 1910 – Hawes Junction rail crash in Cumbria, England kills 12 chiefly through fire on December 24
- 1913 – Ais Gill rail crash in Cumbria, England kills 14 chiefly through fire on September 1
- 1915 – Quintinshill rail crash in Scotland kills 227 chiefly through fire on May 22
- 1915 – St Bedes Junction rail crash near Jarrow, England, kills 19 chiefly through fire on December 17
- 1928 – Charfield railway disaster in Gloucestershire, England kills 16 chiefly through fire on October 13
- 1939 – Three freight cars loaded with explosives caught fire at Peñaranda de Bracamonte station, on the railway from Ávila to Salamanca. Cars exploded and the explosion extend to a store in which had 319 tonnes of aircraft bombs that exploded too. Almost 100 killed and 1500 injured, on July 9.
- 1944 – An accident with a mail train travelling from Madrid to la Coruña and Vigo in a tunnel in Torre del Bierzo, near León, Spain. 100 killed on January 3.
- 1951 – Sakuragicho commuter train fire, Yokohama, Japan, 106 killed on April 24
- 1964 – New York City Subway fire at Grand Central Station, which started on an automated shuttle train and destroyed several subway cars, some platforms, and station support beams on April 21.
- 1965 – A mail train from Madrid to Barcelona caught fire in Grisén, near Zaragoza, Spain. 34 killed and 33 injured on February 10.
- 1972 – Hokuriku railroad tunnel fire in Tsuruga, Japan, 31 killed and 637 injured
- 1974 – New York City Subway fire at the BMT's Metropolitan Avenue Station of the Myrtle Avenue Line in Middle Village, Queens NY 11379, resulting in the complete destruction of the station's entire wooden island platform, destroying R27's 8202–03, 8237, R30 # 8512 in the process, with partial fire damage to R32 # 3659 as well on July 16.
- 1974 – Magude train disaster on March 27 in Magude, Portuguese Mozambique, 70 killed and 200 injured
- 1978 – Taunton sleeping car fire on British Rail kills 12 on July 6
- 1984 – Summit tunnel fire in West Yorkshire, England
- 1987 – King's Cross Underground Station fire, London, England, 31 killed, 100 injured on November 18
- 1995 – 1995 Baku Metro fire kills over 200
- 1996 – Channel Tunnel fire between France and the United Kingdom on November 18
- 1998 – Yaoundé train explosion fuel train explosion, kills 120 people
- 2000 – Kaprun disaster, Austrian funicular train fire, kills 155 people
- 2001 – Fairview DART depot fire, 2 trains scrapped
- 2002 – 2002 El Ayyat railway accident, Egypt, kills at least 383 people
- 2002 – The Godhra train burning at Godhra, Gujarat, India took place which left 59 people dead leading to the 2002 Gujarat riots
- 2003 – Daegu subway fire in Daegu, South Korea], train fire caused by arson killed at least 198 people and injured at least 147
- 2003 – Ladhowal train fire, India
- 2008 – Channel Tunnel fire, between France and the United Kingdom.
- 2012 – Nellore train fire kills 32 passengers on the Tamil Nadu Express near Nellore in Andhra Pradesh, India
- 2013 – Lac-Mégantic rail disaster kills 47 when an unattended 74-car freight train carrying crude oil rolled downhill and derailed. More than 30 buildings in the town's centre, roughly half of the downtown area, were destroyed.
- 2014 – Several tanker cars carrying crude oil caught fire along the James River in Lynchburg, Virginia.
- 2015 – L'Enfant Plaza smoke incident, one dead and 84 injured on a Washington, DC Metro train
- 2015 – Valhalla train crash, six killed after train collides with car at grade crossing
- 2017 – MTR fire, the suspect was killed months later after setting fire on an MTR train
- 2019 – Tezgam train fire, 74 killed in Rahim Yar Khan District, Panjab province, Pakistan
- 2019 – LRT-2 fire, power trip caused rectifier substations located between Anonas and Katipunan stations and in the Santolan depot to catch fire resulting the closure of the three easternmost stations until January 2021.
- 2020 – 2020 New York City Subway fire kills the train's motorman and injures 16
- 2026 – 2026 Penn Station fire is a fire that happened on Thursday, May 14, 2026. There are no reported injuries, but the track fire suspends service on the Long Island Rail Road and NJ Transit. It also comes just two days before the 2026 Long Island Railroad strike

== Bus fires ==
- 1929 – Fire in a bus in Villafranca de Córdoba, Spain. 14 killed, on September 10.
- 1966 – AEC Routemaster RM1768 catches fire at Marble Arch, London on July 30; all the passengers, along with the driver and conductor, escape without injury. The cause was an overheated flywheel
- 1988 – Carrollton, Kentucky, bus collision—27 deaths on May 14, one of the deadliest bus disasters in US history
- 1992 – 1992 Taoyuan County tour bus fire (健康幼稚園火燒車事件) – one bus carrying 50 kindergarten students, teachers, and parents caught fire at Taoyuan City (now Taoyuan District) on their way to the Leofoo Amusement Park, killing 23 and injuring 9
- 1996 – A bus caught fire after crash into a car near Bailén, Spain, killing 29, on February 28.
- 1997 – Bus fire, Guangdong, China – bus caught fire on expressway, killing 39 passengers.
- 2003 – Chun-Lung Bus Fire (尊龍客運高速公路火燒車事故)—A charter bus caught fire at Taipei County killing 6 and injuring 4
- 2005 – On September 23, a bus caught fire in Wilmer, Texas while evacuating nursing home residents from incoming Hurricane Rita.
- 2007 – Comilla bus caught fire in Bangladesh, at least fifty-five killed on January 6.
- 2008 – Lower Saxony: A bus caught fire due to a technical malfunction on the A2 Autobahn (Expressway) near Garbsen in Germany, 20 killed on November 4
- 2008 – Boromo bus caught fire in Balé Province, Burkina Faso, sixty-seven killed on November 15
- 2008 – Firozabad bus caught fire in Uttar Pradesh, India, killing sixty-three on December 9.
- 2009 – Chengdu bus fire, a mass murder–suicide attack Chengdu, Sichuan, China, results in 27 deaths on June 5
- 2010 – During the 2010 Mount Carmel forest fire, a bus that was transporting prison guards was caught up in a wildfire as they made their way to evacuate a nearby prison, resulting in the death of 40 guards as flames overwhelmed the bus
- 2011 – Xinyang bus fire kills at least 41 people in Xinyang, Henan, China, on 22 July.
- 2013 – A bus fire in Xiamen, China, believed to be an act of arson, killed 47 and injured 30.
- 2013 – Volvo bus fire killed 45 Hyderabad-Bengaluru Highway in India.
- 2014 – Colombia bus fire killed 32 children who had just attended a church service in the city of Fundación 18 May 2014.
- 2014 – Six people died and dozens were injured in a bus terminal fire near Seoul, South Korea on 26 May 2014.
- 2016 – Taoyuan City coach fire killing 24 Mainland Chinese tourists with its Taiwanese driver and tour guide.
- 2016 – New York State Adirondack Trailways bus destroyed by brake fire.
- 2018 – 52 passengers died in 2018 Kazakhstan bus fire, all Uzbek migrants travelling to Russia.
- 2024 – 25 passengers died in 2024 Thailand school bus fire, school bus fire in Pathum Thani, Thailand.
- 2026 – 6 passengers including the perpetrator died when a PostAuto bus caught fire as a result of one passenger's self-immolation in Kerzers, Switzerland.

== Road fires ==
- 1982 – 1982 Salang Tunnel fire kills between 150 and 3,000 people in Afghanistan's only road tunnel.
- 1982 – Caldecott Tunnel fire kills six and severely damages major road tunnel in Oakland, California.
- 1991 – Multiple collision of 25 vehicles due to fog in A-8 Highway from Bilbao to Behobia near Amorebieta, Spain. Several vehicles caught fire, killing 18, on December 6.
- 1999 – 1999 Mont Blanc Tunnel fire—39 deaths, caused by the cargo of a transport truck catching fire while in the tunnel.
- 1999 – Tauern Road Tunnel fire catastrophe kills 12 after several cars catching fire following a truck crashing into cars waiting in front of a traffic light.

== Tanker truck fires and explosions ==
- 1973 – Kingman explosion, propane tanker BLEVE incident kills 13, injures 107.
- 1978 – Los Alfaques disaster kills 217 on a campsite near Tarragona, in Spain on July 11.
- 1990 – 1990 Bangkok gas explosion caused 88 deaths.
- 2000 – Ibadan petrol tanker explosion multiple car pile-up explodes 100–200 killed.
- 2009 – 2009 Kenyan oil spill ignition resulted in the deaths of at least 111 people and infliction of gruesome injuries to countless hundreds more on 31 January, following a road accident in Molo, Kenya.
- 2010 – Catastrophe of Sange in the Democratic Republic of the Congo caused at least 230 deaths and 196 injured.
- 2012 – Okobie road tanker explosion in Nigeria killed at least 95 people and injured 50 others.
- 2012 – Chala LPG tanker disaster in Kerala, India, 21 fatalities.
- 2016 – Caphiridzange explosion in Mozambique resulted in 80 deaths.
- 2017 – Bahawalpur explosion in Pakistan killed 219 people.
- 2018 – 2018 Borgo Panigale explosion, a road tanker BLEVE that killed 2 and injured 145 in Bologna, Italy.
- 2021 – Cap-Haïtien fuel tanker explosion in Haiti killed at least 90 people.

== Aircraft fires ==
- 1937 – The Hindenburg disaster near Lakehurst, New Jersey, occurred due to an explosion on the aircraft.
- 1939 – Northwest Airlines Flight 1, a Lockheed Model 14 Super Electra, crashed after a fire in the cockpit, killing all four occupants.
- 1946 – TWA Flight 513, a Lockheed L-049 Constellation, suffered a severe electrical fire in the baggage bay on a training flight, causing difficulty controlling the aircraft and a crash, leaving only one survivor.
- 1947 – United Air Lines Flight 608, a Douglas DC-6, crashed killing all on board. The in-flight fire was attributed to a design flaw in the fuel lines.
- 1951 – N1678M, a Curtiss C-46 Commando, suffered an engine fire shortly after takeoff. All 56 people on board died after it crashed due to the fire.
- 1955 – American Airlines Flight 476, a Convair CV-240, suffered a catastrophic engine fire, causing the aircraft to crash while attempting an emergency landing, killing all on board.
- 1959 – N7071, a Boeing 707 on a demonstration flight for Braniff International Airways, performed a dutch roll maneuver which tore three of the four engines off the plane, and started a major fire on the plane's wing. The aircraft crash-landed, killing all four crew, but all four observing passengers survived.
- 1963 – Swissair Flight 306, a Sud Aviation Caravelle, suffered an in-flight fire that killed all on board due to overheated brakes.
- 1964 – United Air Lines Flight 823, a Vickers Viscount, crashed after a catastrophic in-flight fire disabled controls. All on board died, and the cause of the fire was never determined.
- 1967 – Mohawk Airlines Flight 40, a BAC One-Eleven, crashed following a fire in the tail section killing all on board.
- 1968 – BOAC Flight 712, a Boeing 707, suffered a catastrophic engine failure resulting in a large fire on the left wing. The aircraft managed to make an emergency landing, but five were unable to evacuate the aircraft, including a flight attendant who went back in the burning plane to try and save others. The aircraft burnt out on the runway.
- 1969 – Dominicana de Aviación Flight 401, an Aviation Traders Carvair, suffered an engine fire in two of its engines, causing a crash and the deaths of all four crew members on board, and an additional six on the ground.
- 1972 – Interflug Flight 450, an Ilyushin Il-62, suffered a fire in the tail due to a bleed air leak. All on board died after the plane broke up in the air.
- 1973 – Varig Flight 820; a fire in the rear toilet of a Boeing 707 filled the cabin and cockpit with smoke, such that the pilots made a forced landing in a field near Orly Airport, Paris, France. Eleven people survived, but the aircraft was completely consumed by fire, killing the 123 remaining on board.
- 1976 – Indian Airlines Flight 171, a Sud Aviation Caravelle, suffered an uncontained engine failure on engine 2, causing a fire that disabled control surfaces leading to a crash and the deaths of 95 people.
- 1978 – A Tupolev Tu-144 crashed following a fuel leak, which then caused the right wing to catch on fire. The right engines were shut down, and one left engine failed, resulting in a crash that killed two crew members and led to the cancellation and ban of Tu-144 passenger flights.
- 1979 – Pakistan International Airlines Flight 740, a Boeing 707, crashed near Mecca Province due to a passenger cabin fire of unknown origin. All 156 on board died.
- 1980 – Saudia Flight 163, a Lockheed L-1011 TriStar, caught fire in its cargo bay and was destroyed on the runway at Riyadh killing all on board.
- 1982 – Pilgrim Airlines Flight 458, a de Havilland Canada DHC-6 Twin Otter, suffered a cockpit fire due to leaking de-icing fluid. One person died, and the pilots received severe burns.
- 1983 – Air Canada Flight 797, a McDonnell Douglas DC-9, suffered a fire near the rear lavatory, filling the plane with smoke. The aircraft landed at Cincinnati but half on board died.
- 1984 – Pacific Western Airlines Flight 501, a Boeing 737-200, suffered an uncontained engine failure which started a severe fire. All on board evacuated, five of which had severe injuries, but the aircraft burnt out.
- 1984 – Cameroon Airlines Flight 786, a Boeing 737-200 suffered an uncontained engine failure and major fire while taxiing to the runway. The aircraft was evacuation on the taxiway, but two passengers died from burns after making contact with fire outside the airplane. The aircraft was completely destroyed.
- 1984 – Aeroflot Flight 3519, a Tupolev Tu-154, suffered an uncontained engine failure that started a catastrophic fire which resulted in a crash. All but one on board died.
- 1985 – British Airtours Flight 28M, a Boeing 737-200, suffered a catastrophic engine fire during takeoff. 55 died during the evacuation.
- 1985 – N711Y, a Douglas DC-3, crashed following a cabin fire caused and rapidly intensified by a faulty cabin heater. All but the pilots died, including Ricky Nelson, a pop singer.
- 1986 – Mexicana de Aviación Flight 940, a Boeing 727, crashed due the explosion of a tire, which started an uncontrollable fire in the wheelwell. All on board died.
- 1987 – LOT Polish Airlines Flight 5055, an Ilyushin Il-62, crashed after an uncontained engine failure lit a fire in the cargo hold. All on board died.
- 1987 – South African Airways Flight 295, a Boeing 747 en route from Taiwan to South Africa, broke apart in mid-air and fell into the Indian Ocean 134 NM from Mauritius, due to a cargo fire of undetermined origin. All 159 on board died.
- 1988 – Horizon Air Flight 2658, a de Havilland Canada Dash 8, suffered a severe engine fire, resulting in an emergency landing. All on board survived but the aircraft was written off.
- 1988 – American Airlines Flight 132, a McDonnell Douglas MD-80, suffered a cargo fire on approach. The flight landed safely and no one was killed.
- 1989 – British Midland Airways Flight 092, a Boeing 737-400, suffered an in-flight engine fire of the left engine. The crew shut down the wrong engine, however, causing the fire to worsen and the plane to crash short of the runway, killing 47.
- 1991 – Nigeria Airways Flight 2120, a Douglas DC-8, suffered a fire in the landing gear that quickly spreads throughout the aircraft, eventually leading to it crashing at Riyadh. All on board died.
- 1992 – Trans-Air Service Flight 671, a Boeing 707, suffered an in-flight detachment of its right two engines. During approach to land, the right wing, leaking fuel, ignited, starting a severe fire. The aircraft burnt out following an emergency landing. All crew survived.
- 1993 – the 1993 Zambia national football team plane crash occurred when the left engine of a de Havilland Canada DHC-5 Buffalo caught fire and lost power, resulting in the crew shutting down the wrong engine, leading to the crash, and deaths of all on board, including the football team.
- 1994 – Baikal Airlines Flight 130, a Tupolev Tu-154, suffered an uncontained engine failure, severing hydraulic lines and starting a fire. All on board and one farmer died after it crashed into a farm.
- 1994 – Nigeria Airways Flight 9805, a Boeing 707, suffers a cargo fire and crashes, killing all on board.
- 1995 – XW666, a Hawker Siddeley Nimrod, suffered an engine fire, forcing the plane to ditch and resulting in the injury of 6 out of the 7 crew members.
- 1996 – ValuJet Flight 592, a McDonnell Douglas DC-9, crashed in the Florida Everglades due to a cargo fire caused by improperly stored cargo. All on board died.
- 1996 – TWA Flight 800, a Boeing 747, suffered a catastrophic fuel tank explosion, causing an in-flight breakup and the deaths of all on board. Flammable fuel vapor ignited, starting a fire, which then led to the structural failure of the fuel tank.
- 1996 – FedEx Express Flight 1406, a McDonnell Douglas DC-10, made a successful emergency landing following a cargo fire of unknown origin. All on board survived but the aircraft was destroyed.
- 1998 – Propair Flight 420, a Fairchild Swearingen Metroliner, suffered an electrical fire so severe it caused the left wing to separate from the aircraft, killing all on board.
- 1998 – Swissair Flight 111, a McDonnell Douglas MD-11, crashed at St. Margaret's Bay, Nova Scotia, Canada due to an electrical fire in the plane's wiring near the cockpit. All on board died.
- 1999 – Uni Air Flight 873, a McDonnell Douglas MD-90, suffered an explosion and subsequent fire in an overhead compartment, killing one and destroying the aircraft.
- 2000 – Air France Flight 4590, a Concorde, ran over a strip of metal on takeoff and suffered a fire caused by a punctured fuel tank. It crashed into a hotel and all on board died, as well as 4 in the hotel.
- 2002 – China Northern Airlines Flight 6136, a McDonnell Douglas MD-80, crashed following a passenger committing arson in the plane, killing all on board.
- 2003 – OO-DLL, an Airbus A300, was struck on its left wing by a surface-to-air missile, starting a fire and causing the plane to lose all of its hydraulic fluid. The aircraft managed to land before the wing was destroyed by fire, and all on board survived.
- 2006 – XV230, a Hawker Siddeley Nimrod, crashed following a major in-flight fire, killing all 14 crew on board.
- 2007 – China Airlines Flight 120, a Boeing 737-800, suffered a fuel leak and fire due to faulty maintenance procedures. All on board survived. The aircraft was written off.
- 2010 – UPS Airlines Flight 6, a Boeing 747-400, suffered a lithium ion battery fire in its cargo resulting in a crash at Dubai. Both crew members died.
- 2010 – Qantas Flight 32, an Airbus A380, suffered an uncontained engine failure as a result of an engine oil fire that caused severe damage to flight control systems. The aircraft made a successful emergency landing.
- 2011 – Kolavia Flight 348, a Tupolev Tu-154, suffered a cabin fire while taxxing for departure. An evacuation was carried out where three passengers died and the plane burnt out.
- 2011 – Asiana Airlines Flight 991, a Boeing 747-400, also suffered a lithium ion battery fire in its cargo, causing the plane to crash. Both crew members died.
- 2011 – EgyptAir Flight 667, a Boeing 777 suffered a battery fire on the ground. All on board survived but the aircraft was written off. Seven were treated for smoke inhalation.
- 2015 – British Airways Flight 2276, a Boeing 777, suffered an uncontained engine failure on takeoff, resulting in a fire, injuries and damage to the aircraft.
- 2015 – Dynamic International Airways Flight 405, a Boeing 767, suffered a fuel leak and subsequent fire. An evacuation was carried out with injuries, and the plane burnt out.
- 2016 – EgyptAir Flight 804, an Airbus A320, crashed in the Mediterranean Sea following a cockpit fire of disputed origin, but worsened by leaking oxygen from a crew oxygen mask. All on board died.
- 2016 – Korean Air Flight 2708, a Boeing 777, suffered an uncontained engine failure on takeoff, starting a fire. The aircraft was evacuated, resulting in injuries and damage to the aircraft.
- 2016 – American Airlines Flight 383, a Boeing 767, suffered an uncontained engine failure on takeoff. The resulting fire caused injuries and the destruction of the aircraft.
- 2018 – ZS-BRV, a Convair CV-340 recently restored to airworthiness by Dutch museum Aviodrome, suffered an engine fire during a trial flight and crashed, killing two people.
- 2019 – Aeroflot Flight 1492, a Sukhoi Superjet 100, was struck by lightning, causing an electrical failure and hard landing, the latter of which started a severe fire. More than half on board died before they could evacuate the aircraft.
- 2021 – United Airlines Flight 328, a Boeing 777, a suffered an uncontained engine failure and fire in its right engine, resulting in a successful emergency landing and damage to the aircraft.
- 2022 – Aviastar-TU Flight 6534, a Tupolev Tu-204, suffered a cockpit fire on pushback due to an oxygen leak. The occupants were able to evacuate but the plane was destroyed.
- 2024 – RF-76551, a Russian Air Force Ilyushin Il-76 with 7 passengers and 8 crew on board, crashed following an in-flight engine fire and subsequent engine separation. No one survived.
- 2024 – N3054V, a Douglas C-54 Skymaster, crashed following a catastrophic fuel explosion. The number one engine failed, starting a small fire, which then came into contact with leaking fuel, causing the explosion. Both pilots died.
- 2024 – Total Linhas Aéreas Flight 5682, a Boeing 737-400, made an emergency landing due to a cargo fire. The aircraft was destroyed but both crew members survived.
- 2025 – Air Busan Flight 391, an Airbus A321, burned on the ground from a cabin fire, destroying the aircraft and injuring seven, but killing no one.
- 2025 – UPS Airlines Flight 2976, a McDonnell Douglas MD-11, had its number one engine detach from its pylon, damaging the wing and igniting a large fire. The aircraft lost control and crashed, killing 15 people.

== Other fires ==
- 1916 – Black Tom explosion (fires led to the explosion)
- 1955 – Le Mans 24 hour race disaster, Le Mans, France, over 80 killed on June 11.
- 1967 – Apollo 1 burned during ground tests at Cape Canaveral January 27, 3 astronauts died.

== See also ==
- List of fires

== Bibliography ==
- Marshall, Prince. Wheels of London; The story of London's street transport. The Sunday Times Magazine, 1972. ISBN 0-7230-0068-9.
- Rolt, L.T.C. Red for Danger. Pan. 1966 ed. ISBN 0-330-25555-X.
