= Chinese bus fire =

Chinese bus fire may refer to:

- Chengdu bus fire, 2009
- Xiamen bus fire, 2013
- Xinyang bus fire, 2011
