= 2014 Fundación bus fire =

Vehicle fire in Colombia

Fundación bus fire

Details
- Date: 18 May 2014
- Location: Fundación
- Country: Colombia
- Cause: Fire

Statistics
- Deaths: 32 or 33
- Damage: A bus

On 18 May 2014, a bus carrying 49 passengers caught on fire in Fundación, Colombia. According to different sources, 32 children, 33 children or 31 children and one adult died as a result. The bus driver was arrested soon after the fire.

== Events ==
The bus was returning from an event at a Christian church in Fundación. The bus was having problems, so the driver stopped and attempted to fix them. He began pouring fuel into the engine through the floor of the cabin. This, along with a gasoline container that was already inside the bus, set the bus on fire. Only 18 of the passengers managed to escape; the others died, despite the efforts of local residents.

Colombian President Juan Manuel Santos expressed his condolences for the victims on Twitter. He also traveled to Fundación to comfort those affected. On the 10th stage of the 2014 Giro d'Italia, the Colombia team wore a white cockade as a sign of respect for the dead.

The driver was arrested and charged with "aggravated manslaughter" after it was revealed that he did not have a proper driving license, nor had the bus undergone a required inspection.

Of the victims, 28 were buried at Fundación on 28 May, attracting public mourning by thousands of locals.

== See also ==
- List of transportation fires
