= Caldecott Tunnel fire =

1982 traffic fire in California

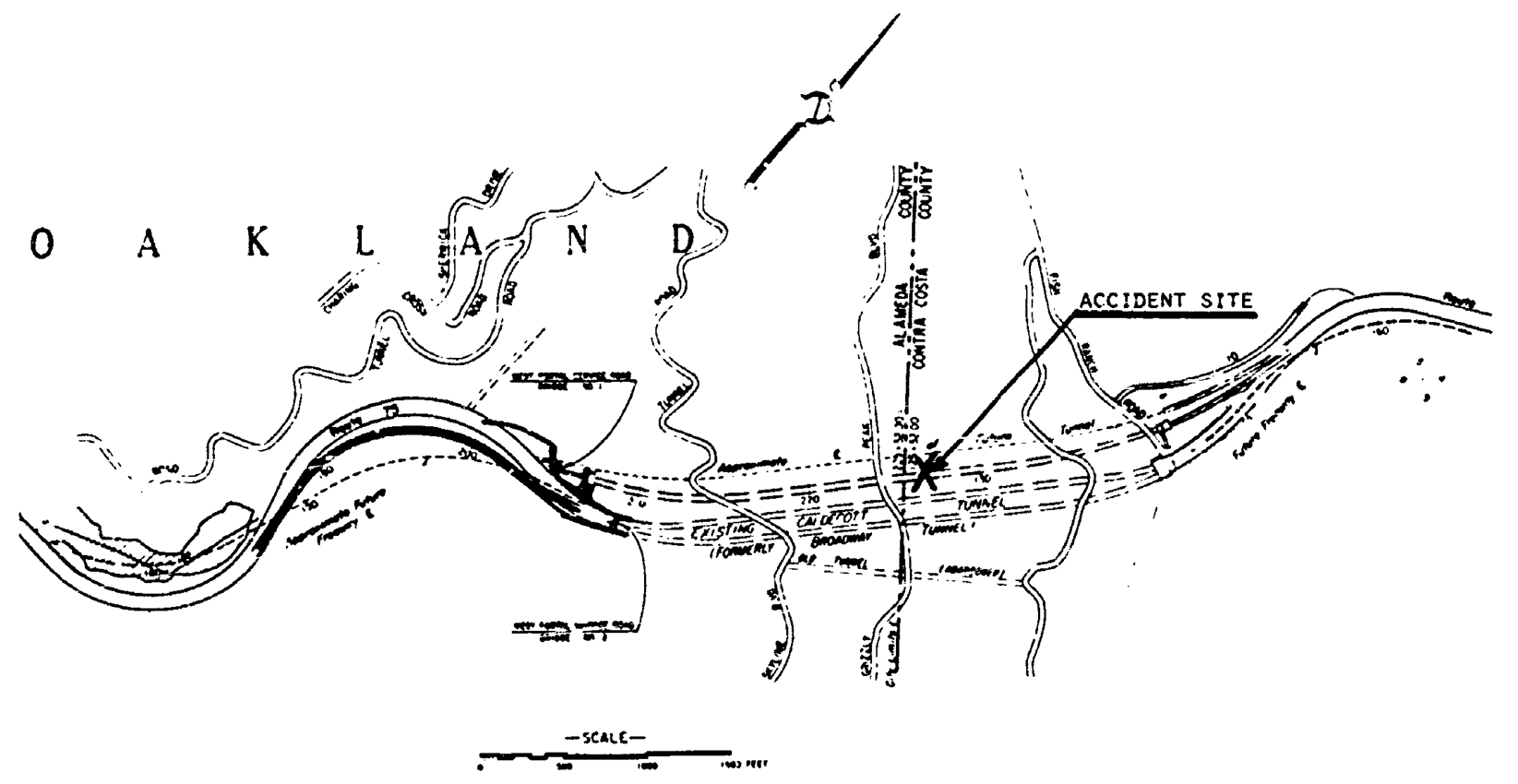
- Plan view of Caldecott Tunnel, showing accident site
- Date: April 7, 1982
- Time: 12:12 a.m. (PST)
- Duration: 2:42:00
- Location: 37.858°N 122.213°W
- Type: Traffic collision followed by a gasoline fire
- Deaths: 7
- Injuries: 2

Just after midnight on April 7, 1982, a fire broke out in the Caldecott Tunnel between Oakland and Orinda, California, which ignited after a chain reaction traffic collision involving a tanker truck carrying gasoline. Seven people died as a result of the crashes and fire, which was one of the few major tunnel fires involving a highly flammable cargo. Tankers transporting hazardous material were largely banned from the tunnel in response.

== Events ==
=== Initial collisions ===
At the time of the fire in 1982, there were three bores side-by-side, each 0.7 miles (1.1 km) long; the first two bores opened in 1937, and the third tunnel opened in 1964. Bore No. 3, where the fire occurred, was then the northernmost tunnel, dedicated to westbound traffic traveling from Orinda to Oakland. It has a grade of approximately 4.0%, sloped downhill from the eastern entry portal to the western exit portal. (A fourth bore, also carrying westbound traffic, opened further to the north in 2013.)

At around 12:12 a.m. Pacific Standard Time, a westbound driver in a 1978 Honda Accord hatchback in Bore No. 3 drifted out of her lane; she was later ruled to have been legally drunk at the time. The Honda struck the left and right curbs protecting the tunnel walls in succession and then stopped in the left-hand (fast) lane almost halfway through the tunnel. The driver got out to inspect the damage. Three drivers passed the Honda during and after its collision with the tunnel wall and confirmed its emergency hazard flashers were operating. However, due to the 2,400 ft (730 m) radius of curvature at the entrance of the tunnel, the stopped Honda was not visible to traffic entering the tunnel.

Within a minute after the Honda, three vehicles entered the eastern portal of Bore No. 3, driving at speeds estimated from 40 to 55 mph (64 to 89 km/h); in sequence, these were:

- A Kenworth double tanker (fixed tank plus a trailer-tanker) carrying 8,800 US gal (33,000 L; 7,300 imp gal) of gasoline (Note: A 1977 Kenworth W900A tank truck with a 1977 Clough trailer; the truck had a capacity of 4,500 US gal (17,000 L; 3,700 imp gal) and the trailer had a capacity of 5,400 US gal (20,000 L; 4,500 imp gal).)
- An AC Transit bus with no passengers (Note: John Dykes, driving a 1975 Grumman/Flxible New Look bus, model 53102-8-1)
- A Ford pickup truck (Note: 1965 Ford pickup driven by Steve Rutledge, with his mother June in the passenger seat.)

The Kenworth driver later said that his vehicle was traveling in the right lane at 40 to 45 mph (64 to 72 km/h) and that he saw the Honda stopped along the left curb as he passed. The AC Transit bus, which had been observed overtaking and being overtaken by the Kenworth in the hills east of the tunnel, also entered the tunnel in the right lane. In the tunnel, the Kenworth driver saw the bus in the mirror, moving to the left and overtaking his truck as the Kenworth was passing the stopped Honda.

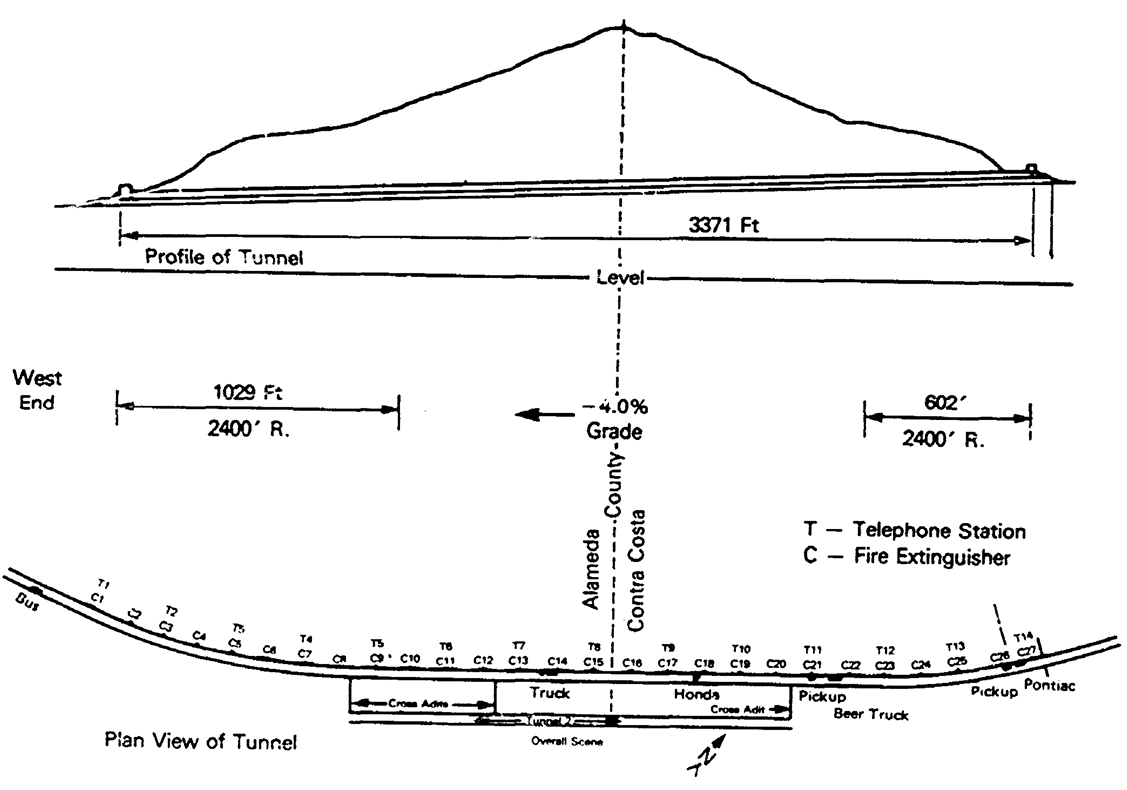
Profile of Caldecott Tunnel and final resting positions of vehicles

Post-crash investigators believe the tank truck struck the Honda first; (Note: This was determined from the heavy damage to the right rear corner of the Honda and corresponding collision damage to the left front axle of the trailer. There was no damage or paint transfer to the front left corner of the bus. The front end of the bus mostly was destroyed by the collision with the structural pier after exiting the tunnel, as the center front of the bus was pushed 17 ft (5.2 m) to the rear.) having drifted partially into the left lane, the Kenworth driver attempted to correct back into the right lane, but struck the right rear of the Honda, damaging the gasoline trailer's suspension. The difference in mass may have meant the Kenworth driver did not notice the collision.

As witnessed by the Ford pickup driver, who was driving in the right lane behind the bus, the bus abruptly braked and sharply changed lanes to the left in the straight section of the tunnel, passing the Kenworth in the right lane; at that point, the bus struck the back of the Honda in the left lane, pushing it to the right lane. The bus then hit the left wall of the tunnel and bounced back into the right lane, where it struck the trailer of the double tanker, causing the trailer to turn over on its right side. During these collisions, the bus driver, who was not wearing his lap belt, was thrown clear and killed. The Kenworth driver stopped his truck; the bus continued through the tunnel until it exited the bore approximately 40 seconds after the collisions and struck a support pier for the service road overpass, just outside the western portal, and came to rest. Autopsies later concluded both the bus driver and the driver of the Honda died from thermal burns rather than traumatic injuries.

=== Fire ===
The driver of the tanker inspected his rig and found it immobile, with gasoline leaking from the trailer into the gutters and small fires igniting around the leaks. He ran downhill and safely exited the tunnel at the west end. By then, burning gasoline from the damaged tanker was flowing through the drainage system. The Ford pickup driver stopped after witnessing the collision between the tanker and the bus, then backed his vehicle to the nearest emergency telephone after noticing a small fire at the tanker. His mother, who was a passenger in the Ford pickup, exited to use the phone while he walked east to warn oncoming traffic.

A combination tractor-trailer truck (Note: 1976 Kenworth Tractor and Utility semi-trailer) carrying beer was behind the Ford pickup in the tunnel, followed by eight or nine passenger cars, all of which had stopped safely; at that time, the fire was reported as being approximately the size of a barbecue. The natural draft in the tunnel (and the 4.0% grade) acted as a chimney, drawing the smoke uphill towards the oncoming vehicles and out of the (eastern) entrance portal.

Final positions of vehicles
Vehicle	Position (Note: Distance, measured west from the eastern portal)	Occupant(s)
Honda Accord	1,196 ft (365 m) by C18	1: driver, died outside vehicle
Kenworth tank truck	1,732 ft (528 m) by C14	1: driver, escaped without injury
AC Transit bus	(past western portal)	1: driver, ejected and died
Ford pickup	807 ft (246 m) by C21	2: driver, escaped; passenger, died
Kenworth beer truck	754 ft (230 m) by C22	2: driver and passenger, both died
Pontiac Phoenix	118 ft (36 m) by C27	2: driver and passenger, both died
Toyota pickup	136 ft (41 m) by C26	1: driver, escaped

Most of the drivers managed to reverse out during the first wave of dark smoke moving towards them. However, four vehicles remained in the tunnel with the Honda and the burning tanker: the Ford pickup, which had stopped at the emergency phone; the beer truck, immediately behind the Ford; a Pontiac passenger car, (Note: 1980 Pontiac Phoenix driven by George Lenz) which had parked sideways to block the entrance; and a Toyota pickup, (Note: 1980 Toyota Pickup) which was caught between the beer truck and the Pontiac. A second wave of smoke and heat then rolled over these four vehicles, killing five: the mother of the Ford pickup's driver, two men in the beer truck, and two in the Pontiac. The two elderly occupants of the Pontiac were overcome by smoke without ever leaving their vehicle. The two occupants of the beer truck also were overcome by smoke, and collapsed and died as they stepped out of the truck cab. The solo driver of the Toyota pickup used the wall of the tunnel to guide himself out of the smoke.

Approximately three minutes after the first crash, the fire had filled the east end of the tunnel. In total, two people died in the initial crash(es), five were killed by the smoke and fire, and two were hospitalized for smoke inhalation. All others escaped unharmed.

=== Tunnel features ===
Bore No. 3 carries two lanes of State Route 24 on a roadway that is 28 ft (8.5 m) wide; there are raised walkways on the north and south sides which are 4 and 2 1/2 ft (1.22 and 0.76 m) wide, respectively. Westbound traffic approaches the tunnel on a 4.6% ascending grade, which switches to a 4.0% descending grade 30 ft (9.1 m) past the eastern portal. At the western portal, an elevated service road was built to provide access to each bore without having to cross existing traffic.

Fresh air is drawn in at the western portal and carried in a duct formed by half of the lunette space between the top of the tunnel arch and the dropped ceiling; air is discharged at openings every 15 ft (4.6 m) and then drawn into the opposite side of the lunette and carried back to the western portal. This transverse ventilation system was intended to confine a fire to a single section. The flowrate is 500,000 ft^{3}/min (240 m^{3}/s). The tunnel ventilation system, which was not switched on at the time of the crash, remained off throughout the event except for a brief period when the level of carbon monoxide exceeded the trigger level.

Television cameras at the western and eastern portals of each bore were intended to monitor traffic so that operators could increase ventilation fan speed as required for vehicles producing heavy smoke. At the time the tunnel was constructed, additional cameras were planned to monitor traffic within the tunnel, but were not installed.

Bore No. 3 has 27 recessed alcoves along the north wall of the tunnel, spaced every 125 ft (38 m) and numbered consecutively from C1 to C27, starting from the western end. Of these, 14 are designated emergency stations spaced every 250 ft (76 m), each of which has an emergency telephone, fire alarm, fire extinguishers, and a sign to indicate if the ventilation fan motors have stopped.

Unknown to the people fleeing east in the tunnel, there are three adits which provide safe passage between the tubes, located 875, 1,885, and 2,372 ft (267, 575, and 723 m) west of the eastern portals; these might have enabled some victims to escape from the fire and smoke, but their color was difficult to distinguish from the tile-lined wall and none of the unlocked doors available were used. Each adit has a cross-section of 4×7 ft (1.2×2.1 m).

=== Emergency response ===
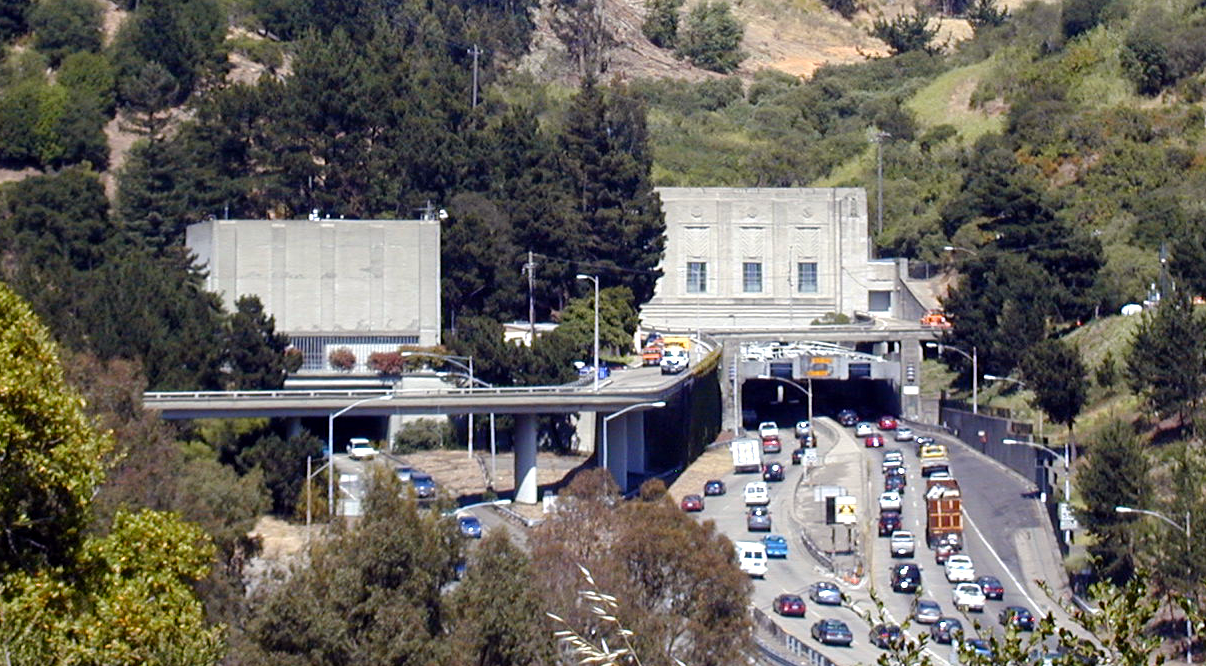
Western portals of the Caldecott Tunnel (right to left, Bore Nos. 1, 2, and 3) in 2007; note overhead service road and supports crossing the mouth of Bore No. 3

The Caldecott tunnel complex also has a permanently staffed control room above the western portal, and the vibrations from the initial crash were felt by the five operators within it. The operators could also see the bus on closed-circuit TV when it emerged from the tunnel and crashed into the column. The control console operator's phone buzzer sounded and a woman's voice (Note: Presumably June Rutledge, the mother of the driver of the Ford pickup; she would return to the pickup when the phone malfunctioned.) was heard saying "there was a whole bunch of accidents in the tunnel", then went silent abruptly after the telephone malfunctioned. By 12:13 a.m., several operators went to investigate both ends of the tunnel and one saw the Kenworth driver exiting the western portal around 12:14 a.m.; the driver shouted that a gasoline tanker was on fire within the tunnel, so the operator returned to call the California Highway Patrol (CHP) to coordinate the dispatch of firefighters, around 12:19.

Another operator checked the bus, found it empty, then drove a tow truck from the western portal to within 150 yd (140 m) of the tanker truck. Because he saw it was on fire with gasoline running downhill (to the west), he returned to the western portal and called the control room to report a fire. At about the same time, two CHP patrolmen heard two explosions coming out of the western portal and upon arriving to investigate, met the Kenworth driver, who told them how much gasoline he had been carrying. Firefighting crews were dispatched from two local fire departments, Orinda and Oakland. Oakland Fire Department units arrived at 12:27 a.m.; one unit proceeded through Bore No. 1 to meet the Orinda crews at the eastern end, which arrived around 12:31 a.m. Crews at the eastern portal reported the smoke was too heavy to enter the tunnel. Leaking gasoline from the tanker ignited and ran 280 ft (85 m) west, some entering a storm drain. Emergency services at the entry (eastern) portal took charge of those evacuated from the tunnel, while the emergency services at the exit portal were able to walk uphill to within 75 ft (23 m) of the fire.

The first concern of the firefighters was to ensure that the gasoline running down the drainage system did not pose an explosion hazard to their firefighting efforts. Around 1 a.m., the Oakland fire chief ordered two tunnel drain control valves closed to isolate excess runoff within a 5,000 US gal (19,000 L) hazardous materials sump; due to corrosion, the valves were difficult to operate and as a result, an estimated 200 US gal (760 L) of gasoline flowed into nearby Lake Temescal before the valves were closed, as noted by "a strong odor of gasoline" and a film on the northwest quadrant of the lake; a flammable gas detector was used later to determine there was no danger of fire.

Two firefighters entered the tunnel to search for survivors and found the seven bodies. By 1:30, the fire within Bore No. 3 had weakened the water main and the remaining pressure was too low to fight the fire. Additional firefighting efforts began around 2 a.m., after hoses were run from the standpipes near Bore No. 2 through the adits, and foam and dry powder were used to extinguish residual fires. The fires were under control by 2:54 am.

== Aftermath ==
=== Casualties ===
Killed

All of the fatalities were attributed to thermal burns.

- Janice Ferris, 34 (driver of the Honda)
- John Dykes, 54 (driver of the bus)
- June Rutledge, 58 (on emergency telephone)
- Everett Kidney, 53 (in the beer truck)
- Melvin Young, 30 (in the beer truck)
- Katherine Lenz, 65, and George Lenz, 68 (stayed in their Pontiac)

Injured

- Steve Rutledge (driver of the Ford pickup closest to the fire)
- Paul Petroelje (in the Toyota pickup)

=== Extent of damage ===
The fire burned for between twenty-eight and forty minutes, during which time most of the gasoline carried by the truck was consumed. About 200 U.S. gal (760 L) were discharged into the lake. Most of the heat and smoke from the fire went uphill towards the eastern entry portal. There was minor spalling of the road surface west of the tanker, attributed to burning gasoline running downhill.

Brass vehicle components at the tanker melted, indicating that temperatures were over 1,800 °F (980 °C), but no examples of melted copper (melting point 1,981 °F (1,083 °C)) were identified during the clean-up operations, indicating that the maximum temperature was within this range. At the tanker, the heat ranged from 1,914 °F (1,046 °C) near the ceiling to 1,650 °F (900 °C) at the roadway. At the eastern portal, temperatures were estimated to have reached 1,900 °F (1,040 °C), shown by the presence of red copper oxide on vehicle wiring. Air speeds ranged from 15.5 mph (24.9 km/h) at the western portal to 71 mph (114 km/h) as the air expanded over the hottest part of the fire, slowing to 32 mph (51 km/h) at the eastern portal.

The tiles and grout on the walls of the tunnel were damaged and spalled by intense heat all the way to the entrance portal, 1,720 ft away (520 m). Over the first 750 ft (230 m) east of the fire site, there was spalling of the concrete false ceiling and of the concrete walls behind the tiles. Spalling stopped at the steel reinforcement bars, approximately 3 in (7.6 cm) below the concrete surface. Over the first 675 ft (206 m), the steel blanking plates over the ventilation flues in the false ceiling, which are used to balance the air supply and extraction rates, were buckled by heat and had to be replaced. The cost of repairs was estimated at US$2.7 million.

After undergoing temporary repairs, Bore No. 3 was reopened to traffic on April 12, 1982. The tunnel's wall tiles, water pipes, lighting, communications, signage and emergency panels had to be replaced throughout the east portion of the tunnel. The ceiling tiles had previously been removed due to poor adhesion. As part of the reconstruction project, enameled metal panels were used to cover the ceiling concrete. The third tube of the tunnel was closed during overnight hours for permanent repairs lasting a period of months; costs of the reconstruction project totaled more than $3 million.

As a result of the fire, a California law was passed which banned the passage of gasoline tanker trucks in the Caldecott Tunnel except during early morning hours.

== See also ==
- Gotthard Road Tunnel — scene of fatal crash and fire in 2001
- Kaprun disaster — a 2000 fire that occurred in an inclined funicular railway tunnel in Austria, where the tunnel's incline produced a similar chimney effect, with fatal consequences
- Memorial Tunnel — obsolete highway tunnel, now used as an emergency response training and test facility
- List of transportation fires
