= 2018 Kazakhstan bus fire =

Vehicle fire in Kazakhstan

Coordinates: 49°13′54″N 60°43′30″E

January 2018 Kazakhstan bus fire
- Approximate location

Details
- Date: 18 January 2018
- Location: Yrgyz District, Aktobe Region, Kazakhstan

Statistics
- Passengers: 57
- Deaths: 52
- Injured: 5

On 18 January 2018, a bus caught fire on the Samara–Shymkent road in Yrgyz District, Aktobe, Kazakhstan. The fire killed 52 passengers, with five persons escaping including the drivers.

== Events ==
The fire occurred at around 10:30 AM (UTC+5:00) as the bus was transporting Uzbek migrant workers to Kazan in Russia. All the deceased were Uzbek nationals; the survivors were two Uzbek passengers and the three Kazakh drivers of the vehicle. A side door was reportedly blocked when the fire started, preventing exit from the vehicle.

Uzbekistan dispatched both Foreign and Emergencies Ministry personnel to the scene, and announced that they would repatriate the bodies of the deceased with DNA testing used for identification.

Kazakh President Nursultan Nazarbayev sent a telegram of condolence to Uzbek President Shavkat Mirziyoyev. Condolences were also expressed by the presidents of Tajikistan, Georgia, Azerbaijan, Belarus, Turkmenistan and King Abdullah II of Jordan.

== Investigations ==
Later on the day of the fire, the Kazakh Ministry for Investments and Development stated the bus was a 29-year-old Setra S216 HDS with an expired technical safety certificate and no license to transport passengers but declined to comment on the immediate cause of the fire. The regional Emergency Situations Department stated that an electrical malfunction was being treated as an initial theory.

Both Kazakhstan and Uzbekistan launched investigations into the incident. A special Uzbek commission was created by Mirziyoev to be headed by Prime Minister Abdulla Aripov with an initial focus on potential traffic rule violations. A special criminal investigation was set up by the Kazakh authorities.

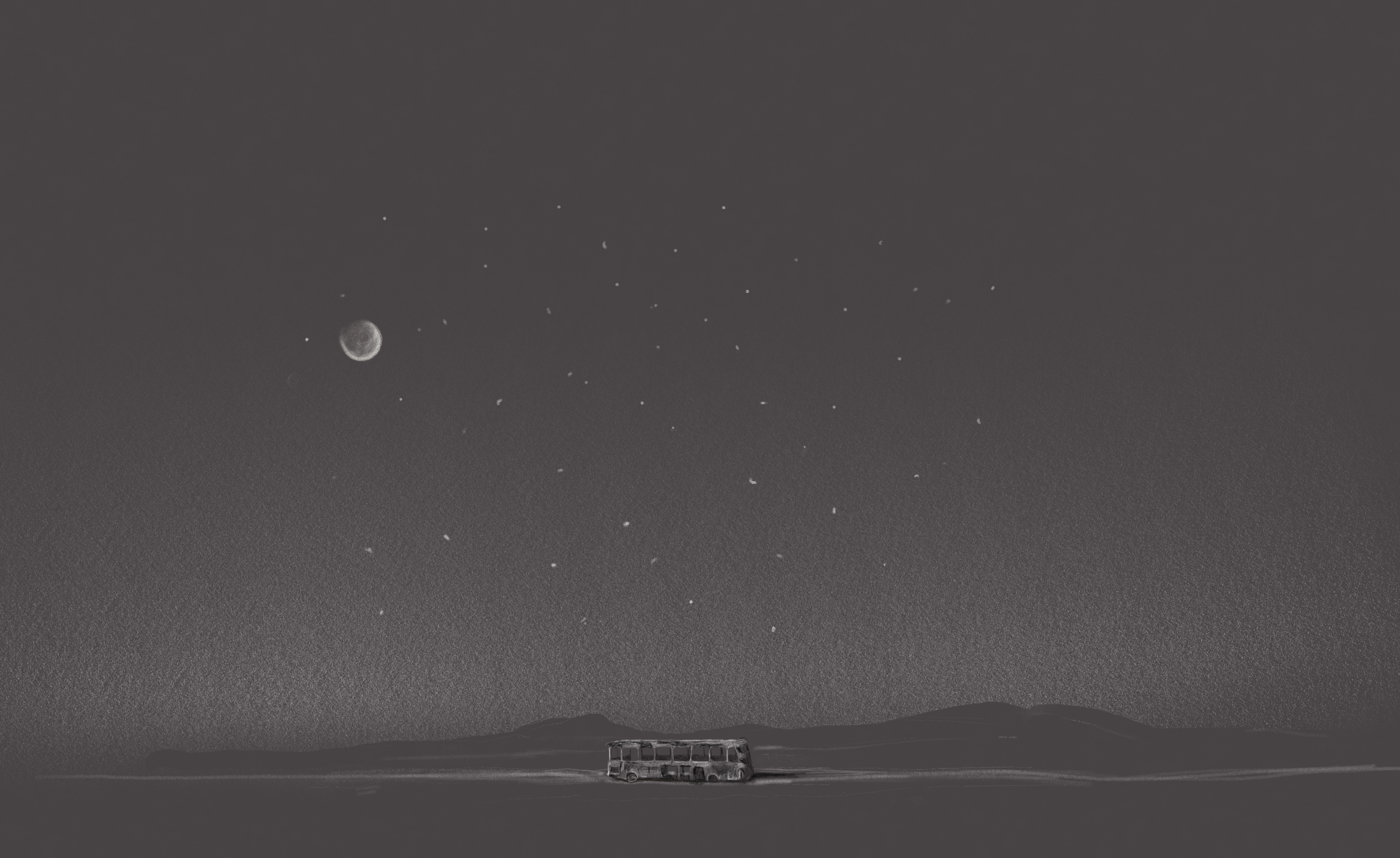
An artist's rendition of the aftermath of the inferno

On 19 January, investigators released a statement based upon the testimony of the survivors, which stated that an open flame cooker used as a heating device was considered the likely source of the ignition, as the bus itself did not have a functional heater. The bus was carrying gasoline containers due to the absence of refueling stations on the long and remote road, one of which was reportedly knocked over near the open flame resulting in the blaze.

A preliminary list of victims released by Uzbekistan's Emergency Situations Ministry on 19 January listed 29 identified casualties as well as the two Uzbek survivors, all of whom were men from the Namangan Region.

On 25 January the drivers were detained by the Kazakh authorities, and charged with violating fire-safety regulations for vehicles.

== See also ==
- List of transportation fires
