= 2026 Kerzers bus fire =

Bus fire in Switzerland

- Date: 10 March 2026
- Location: Kerzers, Fribourg, Switzerland; 46.97412°N 7.19386°E
- Cause: Suicide by arson
- Deaths: 6 (including the perpetrator)
- Injuries: 5
- Property damage: 1 Setra S 415NF bus

On 10 March 2026, in Kerzers, Switzerland, a fire on a PostAuto bus killed six people (including the perpetrator) and injured at least five others, including three in critical condition and one first responder. One injured person was flown to hospital by helicopter.

On 11 March 2026, officials revealed that a survivor told them a Swiss man in his 60s had sprayed a flammable liquid on his body before setting himself on fire. According to Fribourg's general prosecutor, the man "appeared to be 'psychologically unstable'". Officials say that there is no evidence to suggest that this was an act of terrorism.

== Fire ==
On the evening of 10 March 2026, a PostAuto bus caught fire on Murtenstrasse (street) after having arrived in downtown Kerzers at about 18:25 local time. Eyewitnesses reported a rapidly spreading fire, which quickly engulfed the vehicle in flames. The first report to the cantonal police was received at 18:25. The bus had just arrived on PostBus route B122, which runs from Düdingen to Kerzers.

Firefighters, police, and paramedics responded with a large contingent. Upon arrival, emergency personnel found the vehicle completely engulfed in flames. The fire left only the metal frame of the bus. No other vehicles were involved in the fire.

According to the German newspaper Frankfurter Allgemeine, which cited fire experts, the fire could have involved a flashover which rapidly ignited combustible materials on the bus; the thick smoke arising prior to such an event could have hindered passengers' sight, making it difficult to find the emergency hammers to break the window to let them escape.

A witness whose automobile repair shop was close to the scene said that the fire had broken out very quickly, and "within moments" the entire bus was ablaze. Another witness who lived right near the scene reported that a man with a stone had broken one of the bus's windows, allowing one passenger to escape.

== Victims ==
On 11 March 2026, police announced that all victims had been identified. Two women, aged 25 and 39, one boy aged 16, and one man aged 29, all of whom were Swiss nationals and lived locally, died in the accident. The 63-year-old bus driver, a Portuguese citizen, also died. The suspect, a 65-year-old Swiss man, also died.

== Background ==
The man who immolated himself has not been identified to the public by name, but was described by police at first as being of Swiss origin. Additionally, the police believe the man was in his sixties, had been reported missing by his family, and was "disturbed." No motive has been determined, and the police state they have no evidence to indicate terrorism. Later, it was clarified that the man had been identified, that he was a 65-year-old from the canton of Bern, and that a few hours before the fire in Kerzers, a clinic in that canton had reported him missing. However, after consultation with the man's relatives and caregivers, police had not been given any reason to believe that the man might pose a threat.

At a press conference, Attorney General Raphaël Bourquin said that the man who started the fire had got on the bus with bags in his hand, and that witnesses' statements had described his behaviour as odd. He has been described by his next of kin as somebody who lived on society's edges, and who was mentally disturbed. The police investigation revealed that the man who is thought to have started the fire got on the bus in Düdingen, about 17 kilometres (11 mi) south of Kerzers, at about 17:45 local time, setting himself on fire roughly 40 minutes later, when the bus arrived in Kerzers.

According to PostAuto media spokesman Benjamin Küchler, the bus involved in the fire was a Setra S415NF. It had two doors, one by in front and the other midway along the bus's length. Video footage of the incident shows that the fire spread out from the middle of the bus, indicating that the man who set himself ablaze had likely been sitting there. According to Fred Krummenacher, the founder of a club that cares for an old post bus, this would mean that any passenger seated behind the middle door would have had "no chance" with no accessible exit.

== Reaction ==
Stefan Regli, the bus company's head, offered his condolences. Swiss President Guy Parmelin did likewise, and said on X that it shocked and saddened him that once again people had lost their lives in a serious fire in Switzerland; a bar fire had occurred in Crans-Montana two months earlier, in January 2026, killing 41.

The Swiss National Council and Council of States, both in session at the time of the incident, held a minute of silence for those affected before their debates the following morning.

== See also ==
- Chengdu bus fire, a similar incident in China
- Xiamen bus fire, another similar incident in China
- Crans-Montana Bar fire
