= Xiamen bus fire =

Murder-suicide attack in Xiamen, China

Coordinates: 24.49°N 118.16°E

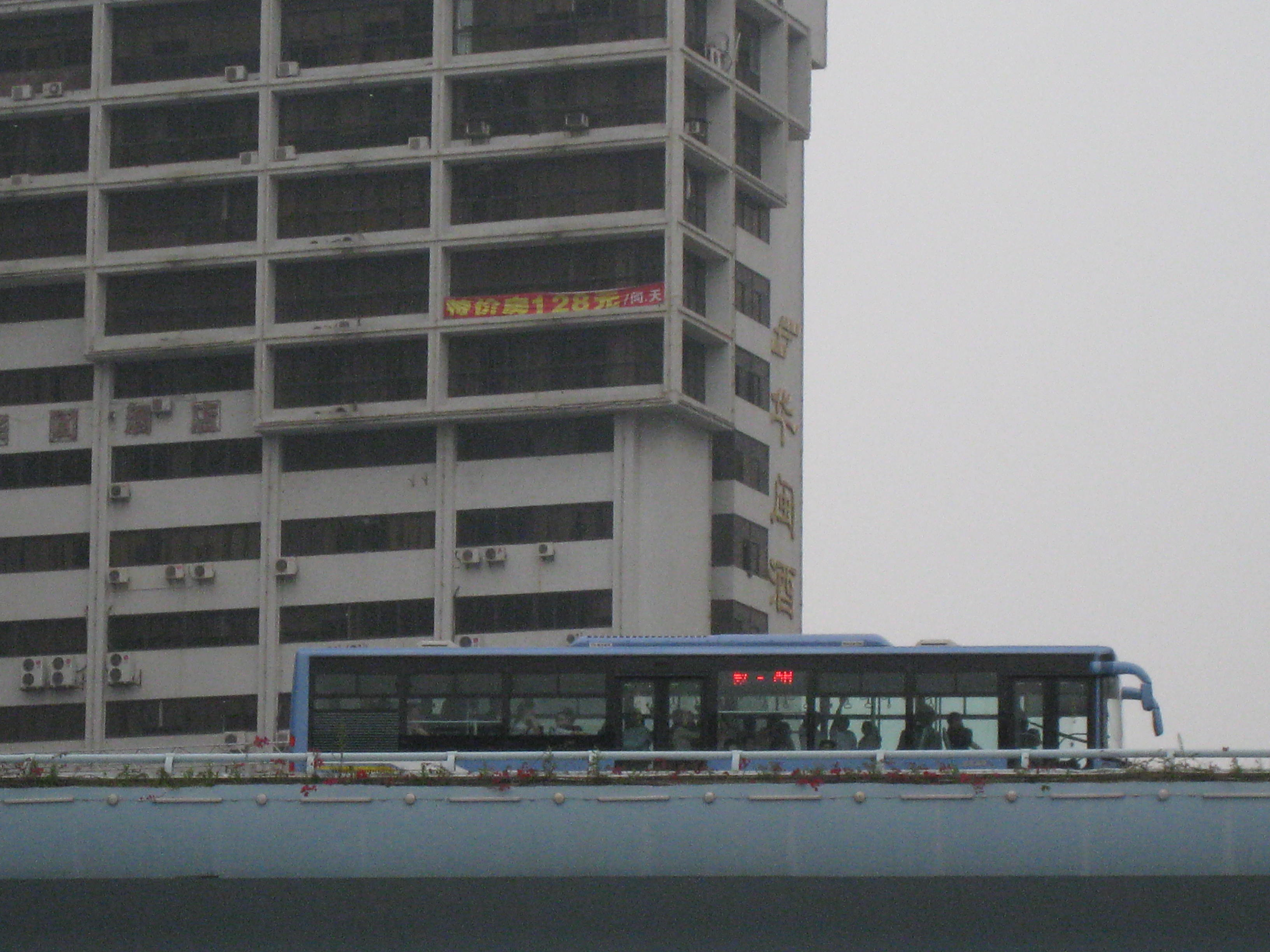
- A Xiamen BRT bus traveling on an elevated road
- Location: Xiamen, Fujian
- Date: 7 June 2013; 6:22 p.m. CST (UTC+08:00)
- Target: Xiamen BRT bus passengers
- Attack type: Arson, mass murder, murder-suicide
- Weapon: Gasoline
- Deaths: 47 (including the perpetrator)
- Injuries: 34
- Perpetrator: Chen Shuizong (deceased)

On 7 June 2013, a mass murder-suicide attack occurred on a bus in Xiamen, Fujian, China. A bus operating for the Xiamen BRT caught fire and exploded on an elevated lane near the Jinshan stop; 47 people died and 34 were injured.

== Fire ==
Preliminary investigations conducted by the traffic police indicate that at around 6:22 p.m. CST, a Xiamen BRT bus, license plate 闽D-Y7396, carrying 90 passengers, caught fire on an elevated roadway between the Caitang (Chinese: 蔡塘; pinyin: Càitáng) and Jinshan (Chinese: 金山; pinyin: Jīnshān) bus stops. The fire broke out in the rear end of the bus and once it had spread to the fuel tank, the bus exploded. The fire was extinguished at around 6:50 pm CST (10:50 UTC), twenty minutes after the bus caught fire during the evening rush hour. Following the fire, the entire BRT system was temporarily shut down, reopening the following day.

Despite the bus running on diesel, investigators found traces of gasoline in the fire. This, and the fact that the oil tank and tires were intact in the wreckage, led investigators to believe the fire may have been deliberately lit. The Ministry of Public Security stated that the fire is being treated as "a serious criminal case".

== Suspect ==
On 8 June, police identified the suspect as a man named Chen Shuizong (simplified Chinese: 陈水总; traditional Chinese: 陳水總; pinyin: Chén Shuǐzǒng), a local resident born on 1 March 1954. According to a suicide note found in his home, Chen was unhappy with his life and had decided to light the fire to vent his anger. Family members, speaking to reporters and posting on social media, indicated that Chen was quite angry with police officials who refused to correct an error in his identity documents regarding his age and was thus denied social security benefits.

== See also ==
- Chengdu bus fire
- Daegu subway fire
- Xinyang bus fire
- 2026 Kerzers bus fire, a similar incident in Switzerland
- List of transportation fires
