= Chengdu bus fire =

2009 arson attack in Chengdu, China

- Location: Chengdu, Sichuan, China
- Date: 5 June 2009
- Target: Bus passengers
- Attack type: Arson, mass murder, murder–suicide
- Weapon: Gasoline
- Deaths: 27 (including the perpetrator)
- Injuries: 76
- Perpetrator: Zhang Yunliang

The Chengdu bus fire was a mass murder–suicide attack that occurred on a bus in Chengdu, China, on 5 June 2009. It resulted in 27 deaths and 76 injuries. The attack was not connected to terrorism.

== Fire ==
At around 8:00 a.m. local time, a diesel bus was engulfed in flames. The number of casualties was aggravated by the rear door not opening and firefighters and other emergency service crews being blocked 1 km from the scene by bad traffic. The exact cause of the fire was not immediately known by officials, but the diesel engines were intact, and authorities quickly ruled out a mechanical glitch. Gasoline carried on board by a passenger was soon blamed, and authorities did not rule out arson as the cause as the investigation proceeded.

Several passengers, including the bus driver, reported smelling gasoline, and traces of gasoline were found in the bus, which did not use gasoline as fuel. Following the government probe, investigators stated that gasoline brought on board by a passenger did indeed cause the fire, but they could not immediately determine if the fire was a deliberate act of arson or an accident. The initial probe did rule out an explosion as the cause of the fire. Pedestrians outside the bus rushed to help break the windows to allow passengers to escape.

Chinese national law does not require buses to maintain hammers for the purpose of breaking the windows in an emergency, but the remains of three emergency hammers were found at the scene. The bus was built in February 2005 and had logged 270,000 km (168,000 mi) at the time of the incident. Including those who died in hospital following the incident, the total death toll was 27.

== Perpetrator ==
The arsonist was later identified as 62-year-old unemployed Zhang Yunliang (张云良), a native of Suzhou, Jiangsu, who temporarily lived in Chengdu. He had previously threatened suicide after his family reduced his financial support. The night before the arson, Zhang told his daughter he wanted to "die differently." Zhang had been addicted to gambling before arriving in Chengdu in 2006 and was dependent on financial assistance from his daughter. Zhang was at the rear of the bus when he burned to death.

== Reactions ==
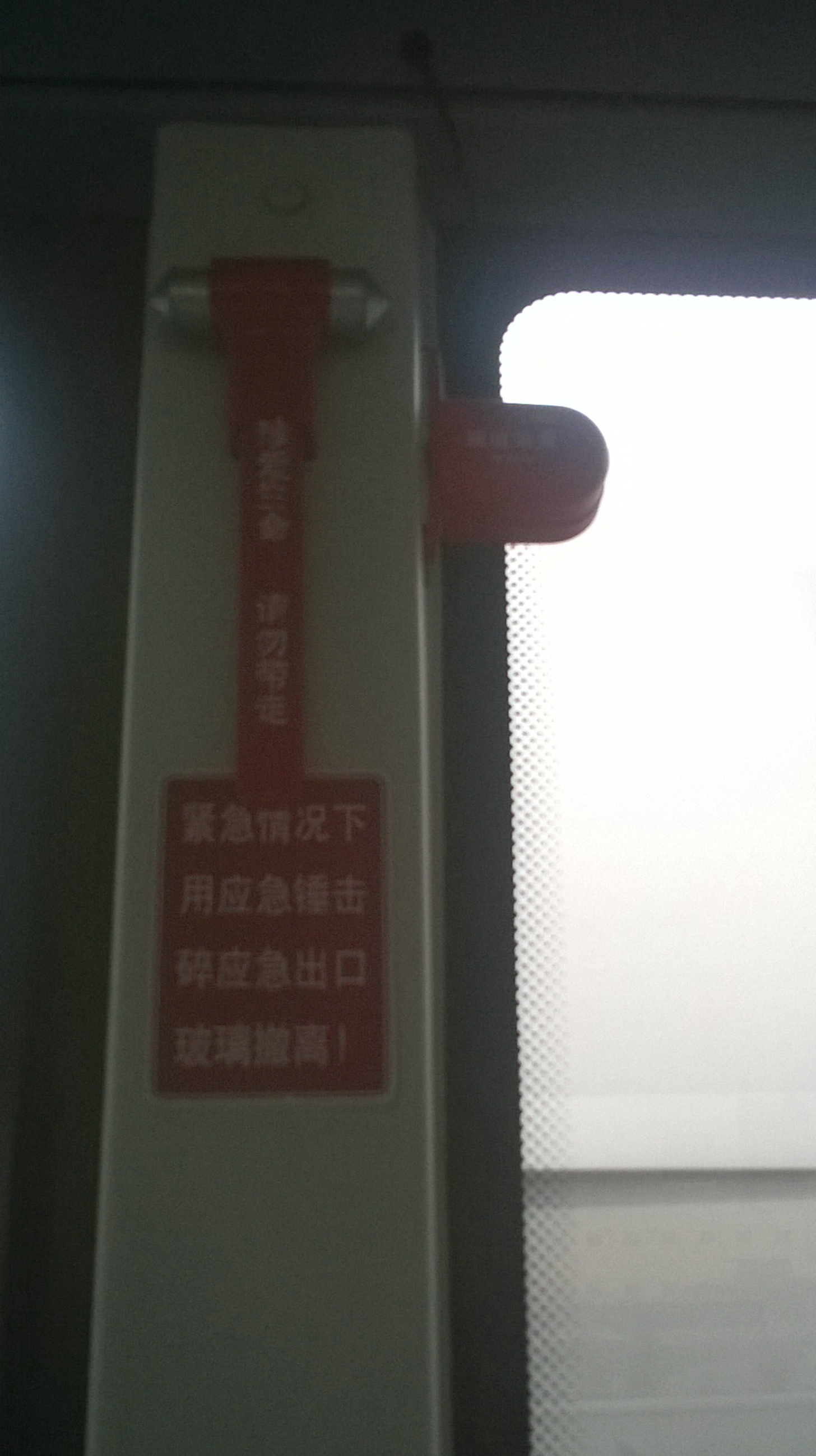
Emergency hammer and emergency glass breaking device on Chengdu BRT

The fire ultimately affected 101 families. Following the incident, Li Shuguang, the chairman of the bus company, resigned, saying he hoped his resignation would "arouse society's attention to the safety of public transport." A bus company in Chengdu promised to financially reward passengers who report others who bring flammable liquids or other prohibited items on board. The municipal governments of Beijing, Shenyang, and Guangzhou reacted by reviewing bus safety measures. Officials in Haikou outfitted public buses with 400 emergency hammers, but over half of the hammers were stolen from the buses within three days. As local hospitals were running low on blood needed for transfusions to help the victims, over 60 Chengdu citizens and 55 soldiers volunteered for blood donations after an urgent call from hospital authorities.

In the days after the Chengdu bus fire, buses also caught fire in Shenzhen, Guangdong, on 13 June, in Wuhai, Inner Mongolia, on 15 June, and in Zhoushan, Zhejiang, on 16 June. There was no evidence initially of any terrorist connection, and no passengers were killed in the three other bus fires. The Shenzhen government responded to the bus fires in Chengdu and Shenzhen by declaring that the city's kindergarten buses must be equipped with GPS.

== See also ==
- Xinyang bus fire
- Xiamen bus fire
- Daegu subway fire
- 2026 Kerzers bus fire, a similar incident in Switzerland
- Suicide in China
- List of rampage killers in China
