= PostBus Switzerland =

Regional and rural bus services in Switzerland, France, Germany, and Liechtenstein

Overview
- Native name: PostAuto Schweiz; CarPostale Suisse; AutoPostale Svizzera; AutoDaPosta Svizra
- Locale: Switzerland; France; Germany; Liechtenstein
- Transit type: Bus
- Number of lines: 950 (2024)
- Annual ridership: 183.1 million (2024)
- Headquarters: Bern
- Website: www.postauto.ch/en

Operation
- Began operation: February 2005 (21 years ago)
- Number of vehicles: 2,307 (2024)

German logo

French logo

Italian logo

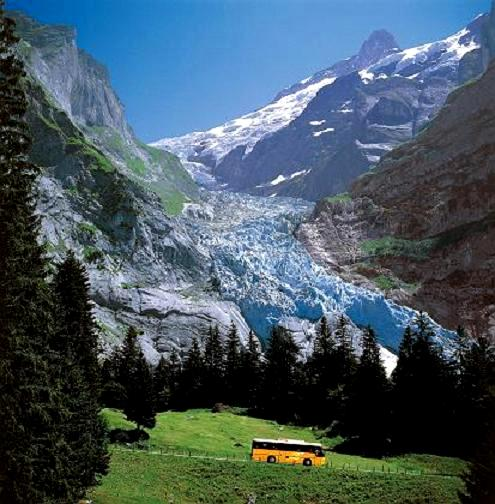
A PostBus bus near Grindelwald

PostAuto Switzerland, PostBus Ltd. (known as PostAuto Schweiz in Swiss Standard German (PostAuto AG), CarPostal Suisse in Swiss French (CarPostal S.A.), AutoPostale Svizzera in Swiss Italian (AutoPostale S.A.), and AutoDaPosta Svizra in Romansh (AutoDaPosta S.A.) is a subsidiary company of the Swiss Post, which provides regional and rural bus services throughout Switzerland, and also in neighbouring France, Germany, and Liechtenstein.

The Swiss PostAuto service evolved as a motorized successor to the stagecoaches that previously carried passengers and mail in Switzerland, with the Swiss postal service providing postbus services carrying both passengers and mail. Although this combination had been self-evident in the past, the needs of each diverged towards the end of the twentieth century, when the conveyance of parcels was progressively separated from public transportation. This split became official with the conversion of PostAuto into a separate subsidiary of the Swiss Post in February 2005.

Sign indicating public transport has priority over other vehicles

The buses operated by PostAuto are a Swiss icon, with a distinctive yellow livery and three-tone horn. The company uses an image of a posthorn as a logo on its buses and elsewhere. On some mountain roads, indicated by a traffic sign of a yellow posthorn on a blue background, the public transport, in particular the postal buses, have priority over other traffic and traffic users must follow instructions by public transport drivers.

== History ==
- 1849: Creation of the postal network diligence.
- 1906: First service of PostBus between Bern and Detligen.
- 1919: Inauguration of the line crossing the Simplon Pass.
- 1921: Grimsel Pass, Furka Pass, San Bernardino Pass, and Oberalp Pass are open to traffic.
- 1923: A three-tone horn is installed on the buses travelling on mountain routes.
- 1949: The bus lines of the Principality of Liechtenstein are operated by PostBus.
- 1959: All buses are of the same yellow color.
- 1961: Last service of horse diligence on the line Avers-Juf.
- 2003: For the first time, PostBus carries more than 100 million passengers.
- 2005: PostBus Switzerland established as a subsidiary company of Swiss Post
- 2006: PostBus celebrates its centenary.
- 2011: PostBus launches free WiFi in Postbuses and becomes the first Swiss public transport operator to add fuel cell buses to its fleet.

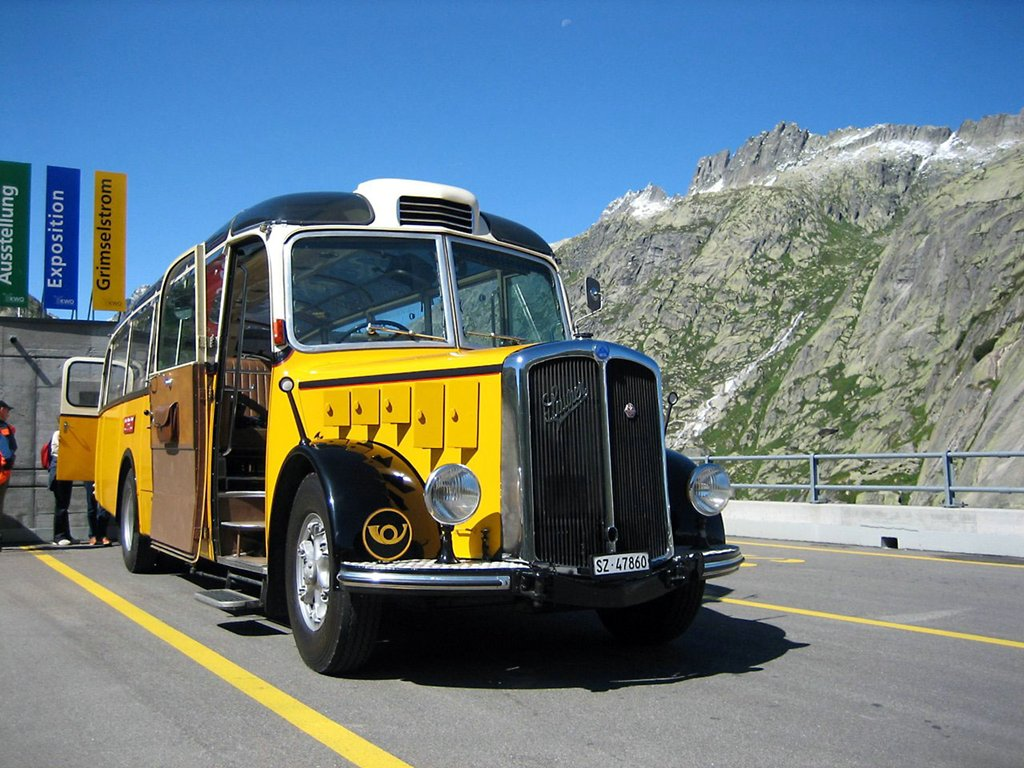
A c. 1950 Saurer PostBus bus

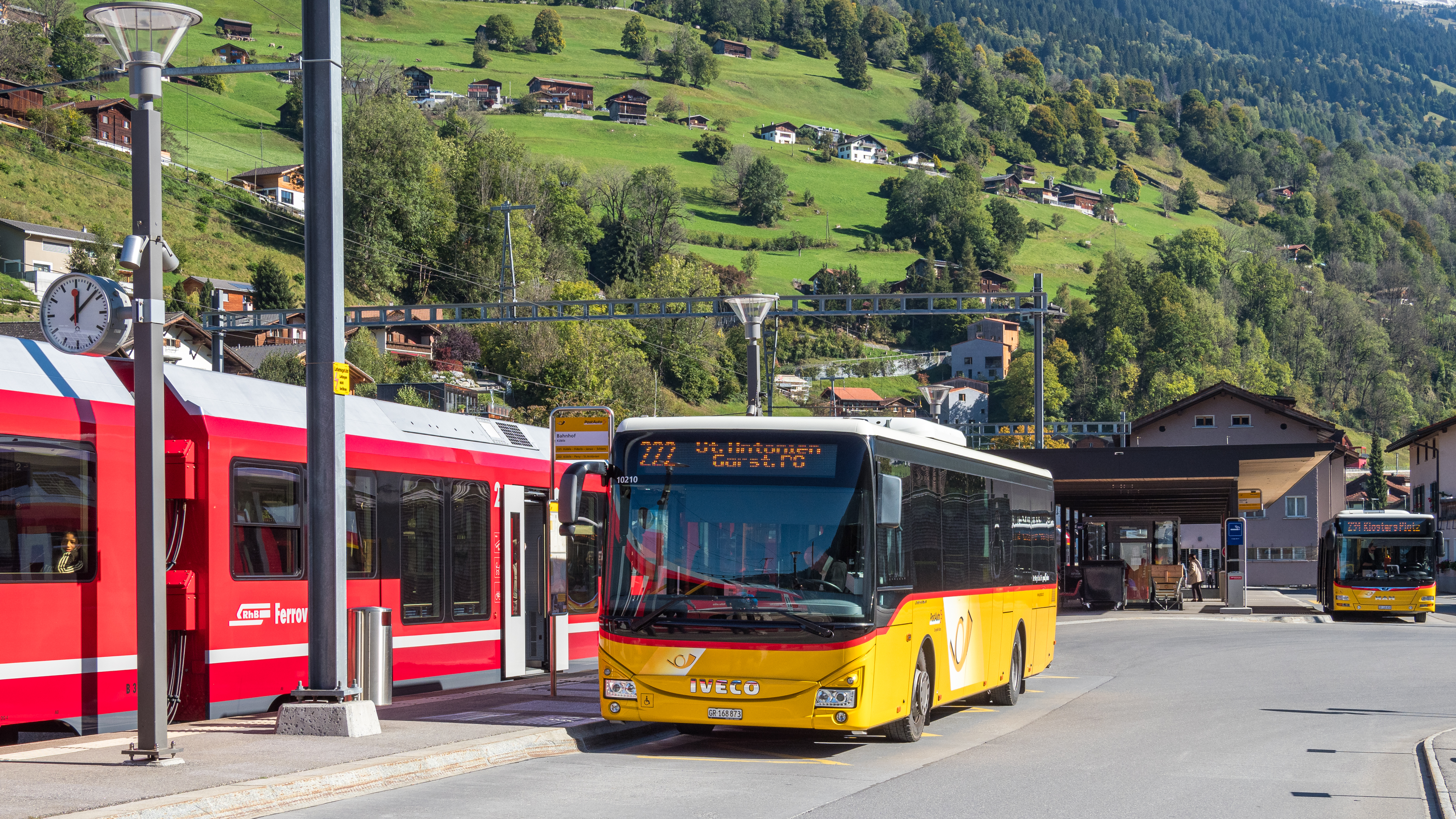
Bus meets train in Küblis

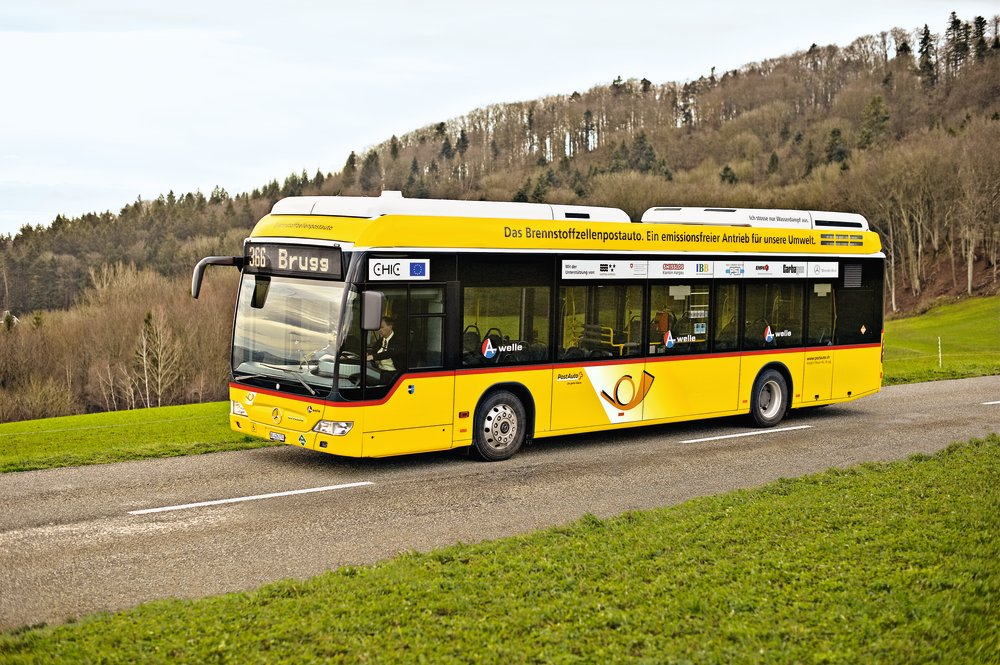
Fuel cell PostBus

== Operations ==
=== Switzerland ===
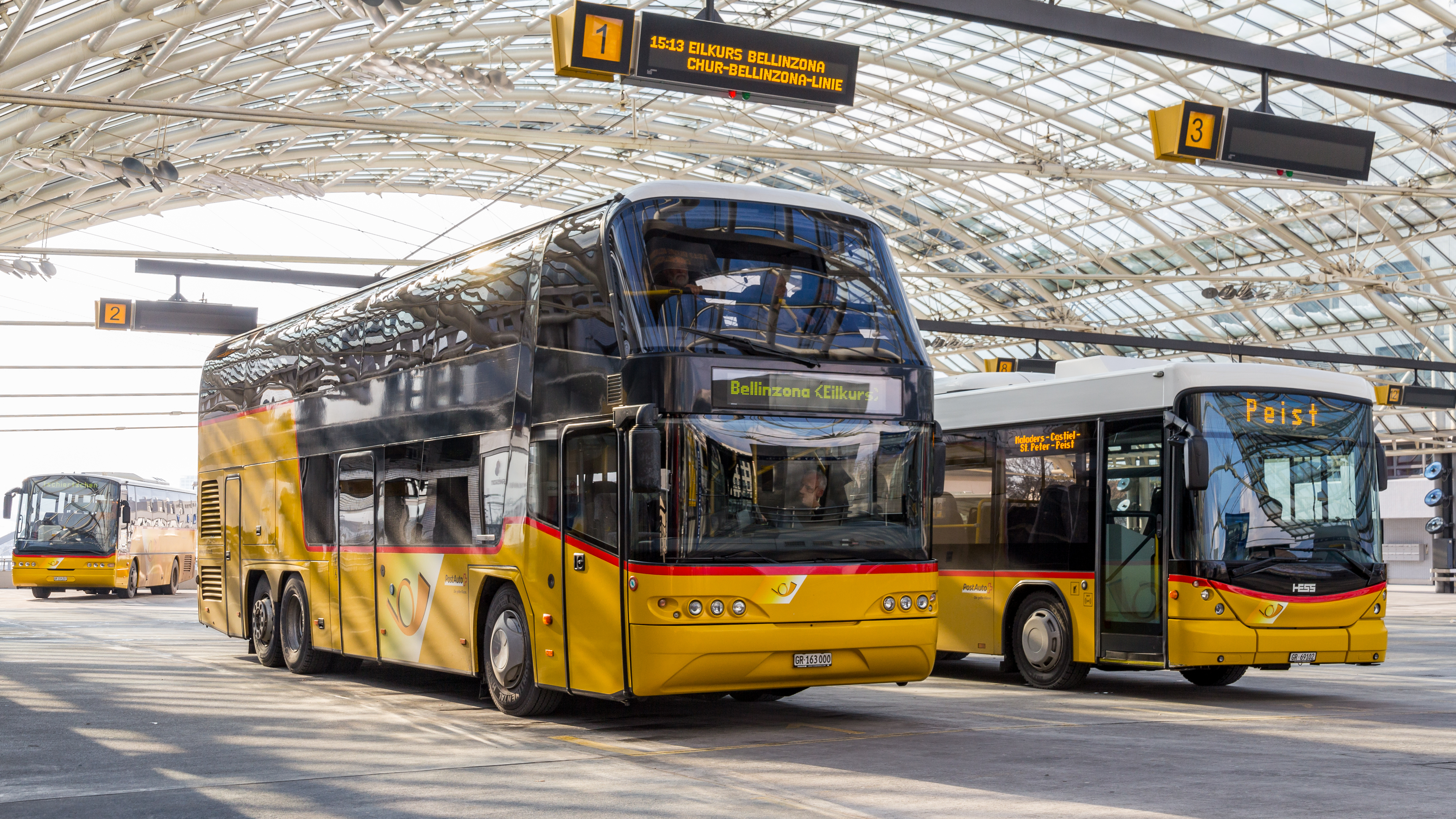
Chur bus station with "PostAutos"

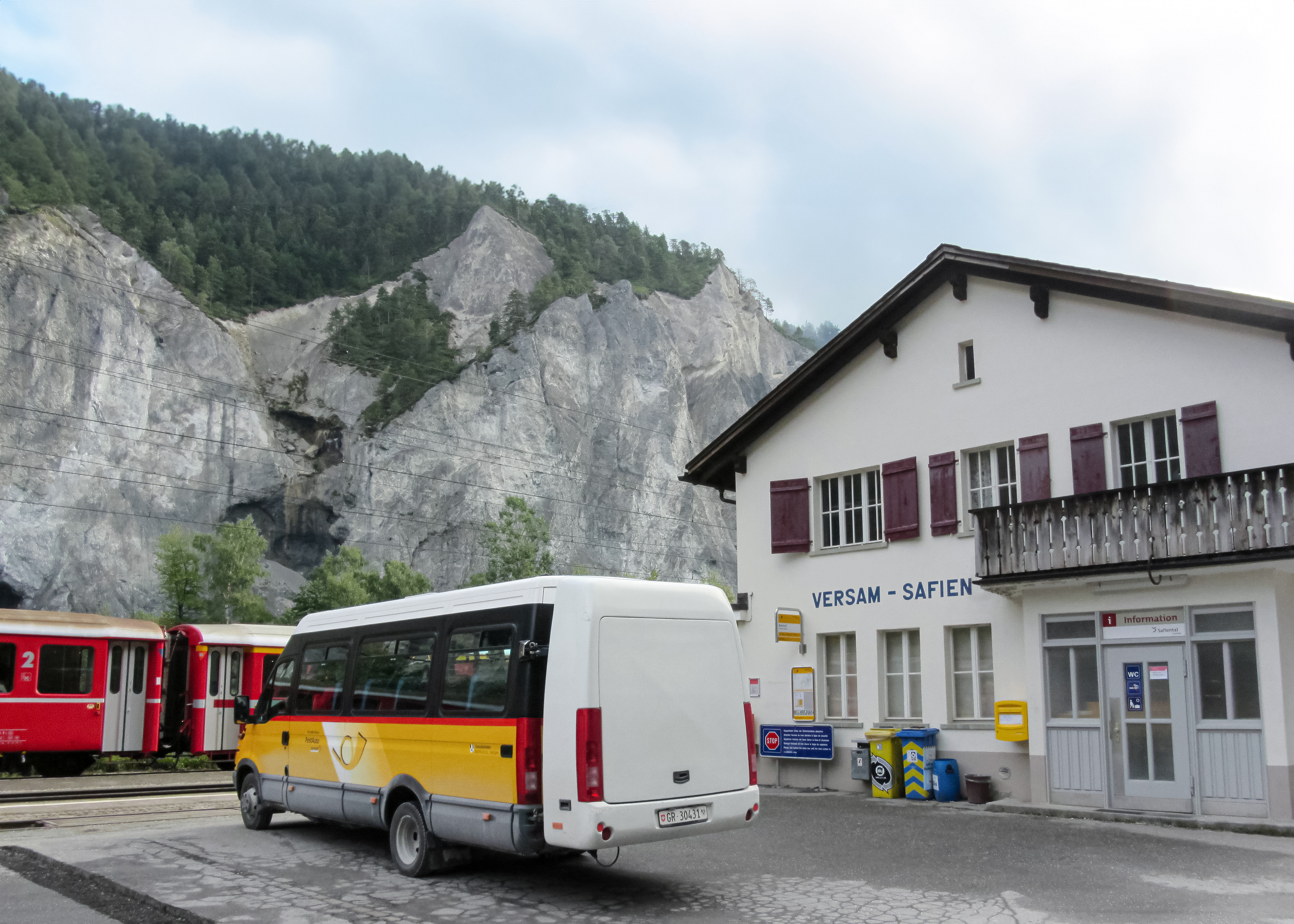
PostAuto waiting for passengers at Versam-Safien railway station

Services are provided by PostAuto Switzerland, a subsidiary company of Swiss Post with its headquarters in Bern. The company is responsible for 869 bus routes with 2,193 buses in Switzerland, transporting over 140 million passengers annually on its 11,869 km (7,375 mi) long network. The routes are either operated directly by PostAuto itself, or by local bus companies under contract.

PostAuto offers extensive services in public, public-private, and private transit, including:

- PostAuto: Bus lines (municipal, regional, long-distance, and vacation transportation)
- PubliCar: Dial-a-bus service for lightly traveled routes
- ScolaCar: Small buses for student transportation
- PostCar: Tourist travel (chartered)

=== France ===
CarPostale France, a subsidiary of PostBus Switzerland, operated bus services in France. The company was headquartered in Lyon, with operations from Haguenau, in Alsace, to Béziers, in Languedoc-Roussillon. In September 2019 the business was sold to Keolis.

=== Liechtenstein ===
Until 31 December 2021, PostBus Switzerland operated the public bus network in the Principality of Liechtenstein under contract for the public transport authority LIEmobil. Following a public tender process concluded in 2020, the operational contract was awarded to BOSPS Anstalt, a newly formed company largely staffed by former PostBus employees in Liechtenstein. BOSPS Anstalt officially took over operations on 1 January 2022. LIEmobil continues to be the state-owned transport authority responsible for planning, coordinating, and commissioning public transport services within Liechtenstein.

=== Germany ===
The German villages of Büsingen am Hochrhein (an exclave of Germany entirely surrounded by Swiss territory) and Randegg are also served via a connection with the Swiss towns of Schaffhausen and Ramsen. The German town Singen benefits from a connection to Switzerland via a PostBus service to and from Ramsen.

== Coaches ==
During most of the 20th century, PostAuto coaches were made in Switzerland by either Saurer, Berna, or FBW.

== Subsidy fraud ==
In June 2018, members of the Executive Board of PostAuto were dismissed by Swiss Post after PostAuto manipulated its accounting records concealing profits in order to collect excess subsidies.

== Bus fire ==
On 10 March 2026, a PostBus in Kerzers in the Canton of Fribourg caught fire after a passenger covered himself with flammable fluid and set himself alight. Six people, including the man who set himself ablaze, were killed.

== See also ==
- Transport in Switzerland
- Swiss Federal Railways
- List of highest paved roads in Switzerland
- List of bus operating companies in Switzerland
