= Glass breaker =

Safety device

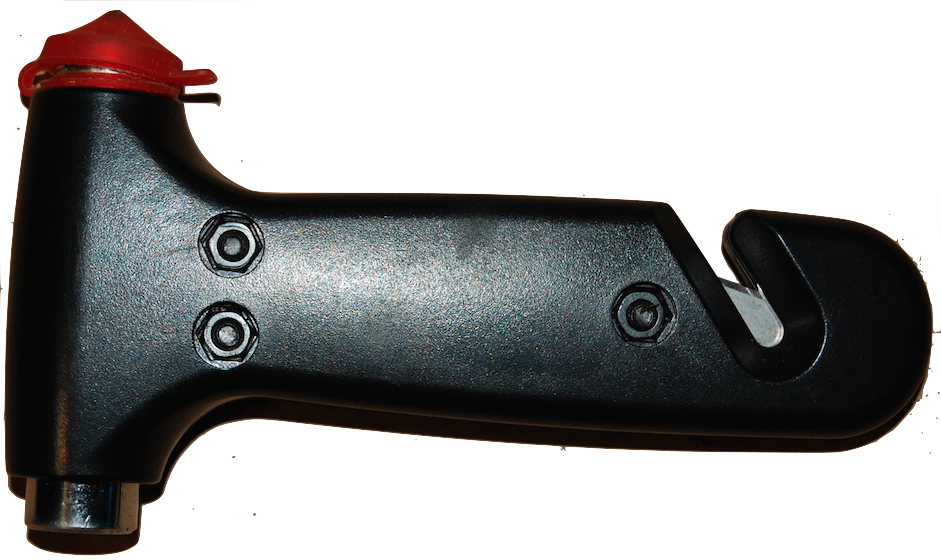
An emergency hammer (the most common form factor of glass breaker) with a built-in seatbelt cutter.

A glass breaker is a hand tool designed to break through window glass in an emergency. It is a common safety device found in vehicles to aid in the emergency extrication of occupants from a vehicle, as well as in some buildings.

Most glass breakers are standalone devices containing a sharp pointed metal tip for breaking tempered glass, and many also feature a sharp shielded knife for slicing through seat belts. There are also many examples of glass breakers being built into other tools, such as flashlights or multitools.

== Materials ==
One variation found in glass breakers is the material from which the metal tip is made. Although all glass breakers are made of strong materials, some glass breakers make breaking glass easier than others, depending on the hardness of the metal that the tip is made of. It is often believed that tips made of harder metals makes breaking the glass easier. Some sources have found that tungsten carbide tips make breaking glass less difficult. However, laminated glass cannot be broken by any glass breakers on the market (but can be broken by other sharp tools as a chisel and hammer)—glass breakers are only effective on tempered windows.

== Types ==
Glass breakers come in two main styles: hammer and spring-loaded.

Glass breakers can also be distinguished by size, and whether they are intended to remain stationary in a vehicle or used for everyday carry by a person. Glass breakers for personal use are generally smaller than emergency hammers such as those used in buses. They are often incorporated into other items such as flashlights and multi-tools, and there are many variations on the market.

=== Emergency hammer ===
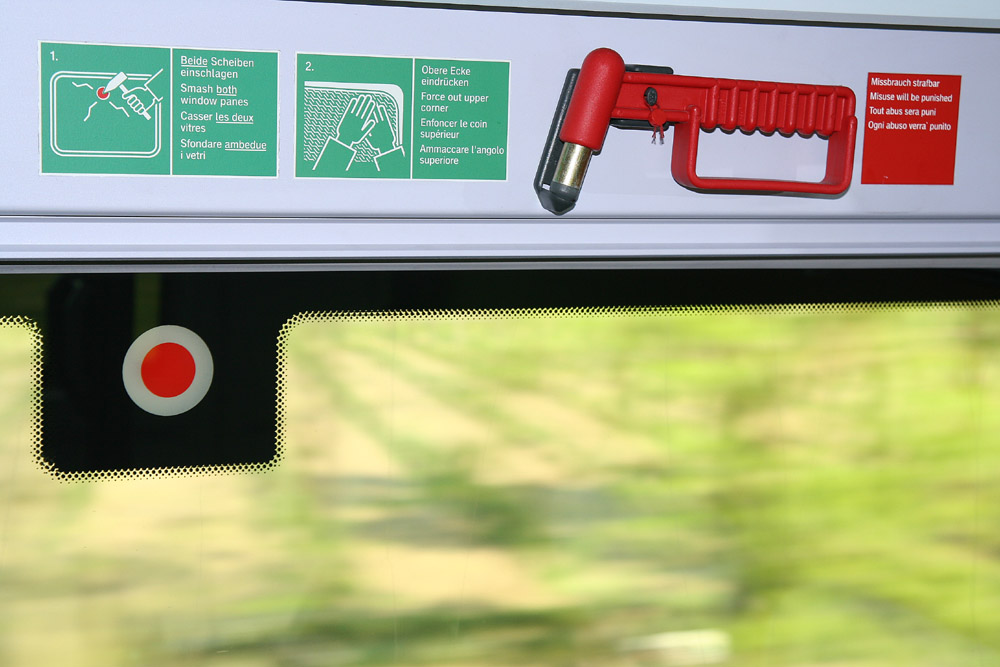
An emergency hammer in a train, with the red spot in the window demarcating the preferred point of breakage.

ISO 7010 safe condition sign indicating the location of an emergency hammer

An emergency hammer is a type of glass breaker shaped like a hammer. Emergency hammers are also known under various names, such as bus mallets, dotty hammers, safety mallets, and bus hammers. Many are attached to a cable or an alarm device to deter theft or vandalism.

It is a simple tool with a plastic handle and a steel tip. Its primary use is for breaking through vehicle windows and vertical glazing, which are often tempered, in the event of a crash which prevents exit through the doors. They are commonly found on public transport, in particular trains and buses and buildings worldwide (except North America including Canada and the United States). There can also be a cutting tool at the other end of the hammer. This is used for cutting through seatbelts in the event that they are inhibiting a passenger's exit.

Emergency hammers can be purchased by consumers in store for their vehicles, homes, hotels etc. to provide a means of escape should the doors/windows become unusable, such as in a collision, if the vehicle falls into water and is sinking or there is a fire within a building.

=== Spring-loaded glass breaker ===
A spring-loaded glass breaker takes away the need to swing a tool to break a window. To break the glass, the metal tip is held up against the window and a pin is pulled back and released to activate a spring, either automatically or manually. Spring-loaded glass breakers can be designed to be used underwater or to simply reduce the strength needed to shatter a window. When a car is submerged underwater, a hammer style glass breaker becomes significantly more difficult to use. While spring-loaded glass breakers can be convenient in some cases, most spring-loaded glass breakers are also limited to the amount of force the spring can deliver, which could limit the user's ability to break tough glasses.

=== Gunpowder driven glass breaker ===
Larry Goodman's safety glass breaker has many similarities with a spring-loaded glass breaker, but instead of relying on a stored spring force, it depends on detonating a .22 blank cartridge with a spring loaded firing pin, driving the glass striker with the help of expanding gases rather than spring tension. This allegedly makes the device less susceptible to mechanical failure and applies a much greater force on the window surface, which in turn increases the likelihood of success in breaking the window.

== Seatbelt cutter ==
A seatbelt cutter with no open cutting surface may be incorporated into the device.

== History ==
Invented in 1932 by Oscar Nisbett and Tobias Hockaday in the Chicago area. They were originally used by the notorious criminals Nisbett and Hockaday to steal from expensive vehicles until their arrest in 1941 in which the glass breaker was now being mass produced.

A patent for a glass breaker also was filed in 2001 as US patent 6,418,628.

== See also ==
- Door breaching
- Forcible entry
- Halligan bar
