= Xinyang bus fire =

Bus fire that occurred in Xinyang, Henan

Beijing-Zhuhai highway bus fire

Details
- Date: July 22, 2011; 3:43 am CST
- Location: Near Xingyangminggang
- Owner: Weihai Transport Company
- Cause: Bus was carrying Azobisisobutyronitrile

Statistics
- Vehicles: Sleeper bus
- Passengers: 47
- Deaths: 41
- Injured: 6

On 22 July 2011 at 03:43 Beijing Time (20:00 UTC on the 21st), a bus fire occurred in Xinyang, Henan, causing the deaths of 41 people and injuring 6 others.

== Fire ==
The fire occurred on China National Highway 105, which links Beijing to Zhuhai, Guangdong. At 3:43 am, a fire started at the rear of the bus, rapidly consuming the bus. Upon noticing the explosion, the driver immediately pulled over to the left and stopped in 145 meters. Some of the survivors reported hearing an explosion at the back of the vehicle when the fire started. Six people, including the driver, survived and were hospitalized. As a result of the fire, the vehicle was severely damaged.

== Investigation ==
The investigation concluded that the vehicle was illegally carrying 15 boxes of azobisisobutyronitrile, each weighing 20 kg. It was found that at Weihai, the starting point of the route, Huichang Company worker Zhang Hui (deceased) loaded the 10 boxes on to the bus, first into the luggage area then later moved into locked toilet with another 5 loaded on later, beside the toilet, and due to the improper packaging, the motion of the vehicle and the heat generated from the engine caused it to decompose and combust. According to the 'Safe management of dangerous chemicals', Zhang Hui should've used a refrigerator truck, instead deliberately transporting it on a public transport vehicle despite the contract stipulating the use of a refrigerated transport.

== Aftermath ==
As a result of the investigation, 10 people involved with Weihai Transport Company, the manufacturer of the chemical and the contracted transporter company were arrested. Two people were sentenced to life imprisonment in December 2013. The bus driver and several managers of the bus company were sentenced to jail terms of several years.

== See also ==
- Chengdu bus fire
- Xiamen bus fire
