= List of accidents and incidents involving airliners by location =

This list of accidents and incidents on airliners by location summarizes airline accidents by state location, airline company with flight number, date, and cause. It is also available grouped

- by year as List of accidents and incidents involving commercial aircraft;
- by airline;
- by category.

If the aircraft crashed on land, it will be listed under a continent and a country. If the aircraft crashed on a body of water, it will be listed under that body of water (unless that body of water falls within a country's territory). Accidents and incidents written in bold were the deadliest in that country.

== Africa ==
=== Algeria ===
- 10 May 1961 – Air France Flight 406, a Lockheed L-1649, was destroyed by a bomb above the Sahara, killing all 78 on board.
- 11 April 1967 – a Douglas DC-4 of Air Algérie crashed on approach to Tamanrasset, killing 35 people.
- 23 July 1968 – El Al Flight 426, a Boeing 707, was hijacked and flown to Algiers. Upon landing at Houari Boumediene Airport, Algerian authorities grounded the aircraft and held 22 hostages, who were held for up to 40 days.
- 18 September 1994 – a BAC One-Eleven of Oriental Airlines crashed on approach to Tamanrasset after experiencing fuel exhaustion following 3 missed approaches. The aircraft touched down on the runway and broke up, killing 5 people.
- 24–26 December 1994 – Air France Flight 8969, an Airbus A300, was hijacked on the ground at Algiers on 24 December, and flown to France on 26 December. 3 passengers were killed in the ordeal, and the 4 hijackers were killed when the aircraft was stormed in Marseille.
- 6 March 2003 – **Air Algérie Flight 6289**, a Boeing 737-200, suffered a failure of the left engine 5 seconds after takeoff. The subsequent loss of control killed all but one of the 103 people on board.

=== Angola ===
- 26 March 1979 – an Interflug Ilyushin Il-18 overran the runway on takeoff from Luanda Airport due to engine failure and pilot error, killing all 10 on board.
- 8 November 1983 – TAAG Angola Airlines Flight 462, a Boeing 737-200, crashed after its left wing struck the ground on landing at Lubango Airport, killing all 130 on board. Authorities ruled the crash was caused by a mechanical failure, but UNITA Guerilla rebels claimed to have shot down the aircraft with a surface-to-air missile.
- 25 November 1985 – an Aeroflot Antonov An-24 was shot down by a surface-to-air missile and crashed near Menongue, killing all 23 crew members on board.
- 27 November 1989 – a Lockheed Hercules operated by Tepper Aviation on behalf of the CIA crashed in unknown circumstances in Jamba. All 5 crew members were killed.
- 18 December 1995 – **A Trans Service Airlift Lockheed L-188 crashed** on shortly after takeoff from Jamba Airport, killing 141 passengers and crew. The aircraft had been filled with 40 people beyond specifications. One crewmember and two passengers survived.
- 15 November 2000 – an Antonov An-24 operated by ASA Pesada lost control and crashed following an engine failure shortly after takeoff from Luanda, killing all 57 on board.
- 25 May 2003 – a Boeing 727 leased to TAAG Angola Airlines was stolen from Quatro de Fevereiro Airport in Luanda on 25 May 2003. The aircraft disappeared after takeoff, and a mechanic confirmed to be on board has not been heard from since.

=== Benin ===
- 25 December 2003 – **UTA Flight 141**, A Boeing 727-200, could not gain altitude on takeoff due to overloading, and struck an airport structure at Cotonou Airport. The Boeing 727 slid and broke into three parts, all of which plunged into the Atlantic. Of 150 passengers and 10 crew, 22 people survived.

=== Botswana ===
- 4 April 1974 – a Douglas DC-4 operated by Wenela Air Services **crashed** while making an emergency landing at Francistown Airport, killing 78 of the 84 passengers and crew. The engines had overheated and eventually failed, and the aircraft crashed short of the runway. Fuel contamination was suspected as the cause of the failures.
- 11 October 1999 – the 1999 Air Botswana incident occurred when Chris Patswe, a former Air Botswana pilot, hijacked an ATR 42 and crashed it into two other Air Botswana ATR 42. He was the only person who died.
- 14 October 2011 – a Cessna 208 operated by Moremi Air crashed near Xakanaka Camp after suffering an engine failure on takeoff. 8 of the 12 occupants were killed.

=== Burundi ===
- 4 December 2000 – Sabena Flight 877, an Airbus A330, was hit by gunfire on landing at Bujumbura Airport. No one was killed.

=== Cameroon ===
- 4 March 1962 – Caledonian Airways Flight 153, a Douglas DC-7C, crashed into a swamp shortly after takeoff from Douala International Airport on 4 March 1962, killing all 111 aboard. The cause was never determined.
- 30 August 1984 – Cameroon Airlines Flight 786, a Boeing 737-2H7C, was taxiing for takeoff from Douala International Airport when engine number 2 suffered a turbine engine failure, which resulted in a fire. All 116 passengers and crews were able to evacuate from the burning aircraft, but two passengers died due to fire outside of the aircraft.
- 3 December 1995 – Cameroon Airlines Flight 3701, a Boeing 737-200, nose-dived and crashed into a swamp on approach to Douala International Airport, killing 71 people and injuring five. Engine thrust asymmetry and subsequent loss of control are suspected as the cause of the incident.
- 5 May 2007 – **Kenya Airways Flight 507**, a Boeing 737-800, crashed shortly after takeoff from Douala International Airport. The aircraft suddenly banked heavily to the right, nose-dived, and crashed into a swamp, killing all 114 aboard. The incident was caused by pilot error. The investigation identified a lack of crew coordination, spatial disorientation, and confusion in the use of the autopilot as contributing factors to Cameroon's deadliest plane crash.
- 19 June 2010 – an Aéro-Service CASA C-212 carrying the board of Australian mining conglomerate Sundance Resources crashed near Dima in the South Region, killing all 11 on board.
- 11 May 2022 – a Twin Otter of Caverton Helicopters crashed near Nanga Eboko, killing all 11 on board.

=== Chad ===
- 24 January 2007 – Air West Flight 612, a Boeing 737-200, was hijacked shortly after takeoff from Khartoum, Sudan, and flown to N'Djamena, Chad. No casualties occurred, and the hijacker gave himself up upon reaching Chad.

=== Comoros ===
- 23 November 1996 – Ethiopian Airlines Flight 961, a Boeing 767-200ER, was hijacked en route from Addis Ababa to Nairobi by three Ethiopians seeking political asylum. The plane crash-landed in the Indian Ocean near Comoros after running out of fuel, killing 125 of the 175 passengers and crew on board.
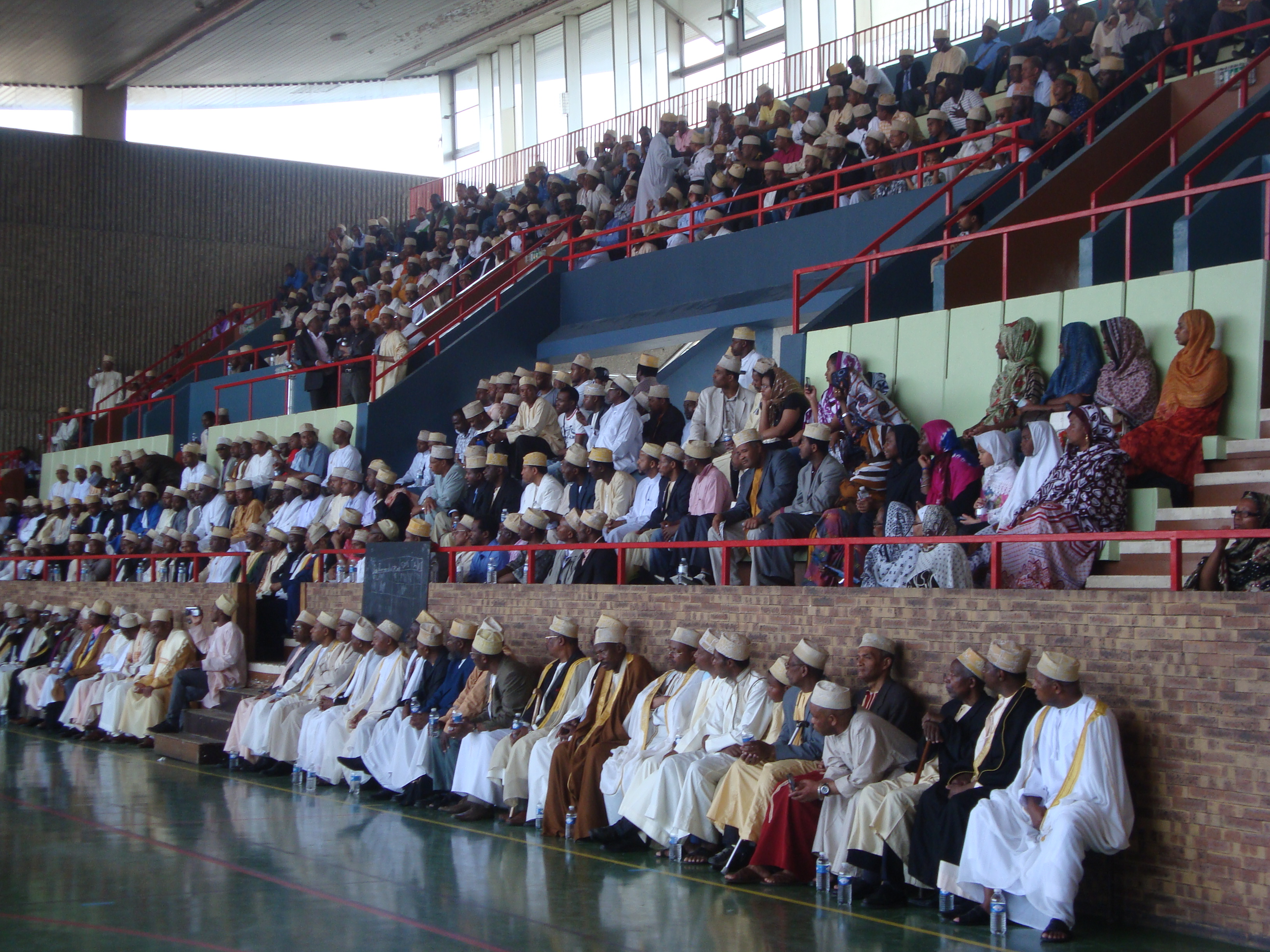
  Vigil for the victims of Yemenia Flight 626, one year after the crash
- 30 June 2009 – **Yemenia Flight 626**, an Airbus A310, was on approach to Moroni when it stalled. The flight crew did not take the appropriate action to recover it and the plane crashed into the Indian Ocean off the northern coast of Comoros. Of 153 aboard, 152 died; a 12-year-old passenger was found alive.

=== Democratic Republic of the Congo ===
- 12 May 1948 – A Sabena Douglas DC-4 crashed south of Libenge after likely flying into a tornado. 31 of the 32 occupants were killed.
- 8 January 1996 – the **1996 Air Africa crash** occurred when an Antonov An-32B, operated by Moscow Airways for Air Africa, failed to take off due to being over maximum takeoff weight. The aircraft overran the runway and ploughed into a crowded market. The 4 crew members survived, but at least 220 people were killed on the ground, with the official report stating 237 deaths.
- 10 October 1998 – A Boeing 727 of Congo Airlines was shot down and crashed into the Lomami National Park, killing all on board. Casualty estimates vary, but Congolese authorities state 40-41 deaths occurred.
- 8 May 2003 – An Ilyushin Il-76MD operating a civilian transport flight for Ukrainian Cargo Airways suffered an explosive decompression when the cargo door opened mid-flight over Mbuji-Mayi. Several occupants were blown out of the aircraft. Congolese officials confirmed 17 deaths, but estimates vary up to 200.
- 21 June 2007 – A Let L-410 operated by Free Airlines crashed in a swamp shortly after takeoff from Kamina Airport on 21 June 2007. The plane was overloaded, carrying 21 passengers and crew rather than the 17 maximum specified. One person died, and four others were badly injured.
- 4 October 2007 – an Antonov An-26 operated by Africa One crashed and burned shortly after takeoff from Kinshasa. Deaths numbered 51, including 30 on the ground. One, possibly two, passengers survived.
- 15 April 2008 – Hewa Bora Airways Flight 122, a Douglas DC-9, crashed into a residential and market area of Goma after its engines failed during takeoff. Three passengers and 37 people on the ground died; 83 passengers and eight crew survived. Additionally, 111 injuries were reported, 40 of whom were passengers.
- 25 August 2010 – A Let L-410 of Filair crashed following a loss of control on approach to Bandundu Airport, killing 20 of the 21 people on board. Investigators could not determine the cause of the accident, but the sole survivor stated that a crocodile smuggled in a duffel bag had escaped, causing panic and a sudden weight shift as passengers rushed to the front of the plane.
- 4 April 2011 – Georgian Airways Flight 834, a Bombardier CRJ100ER operating on behalf of the United Nations, crashed after experiencing a microburst immediately after initiating a go-around at N'djili Airport in Kinshasa. 32 of the 33 people on board were killed.
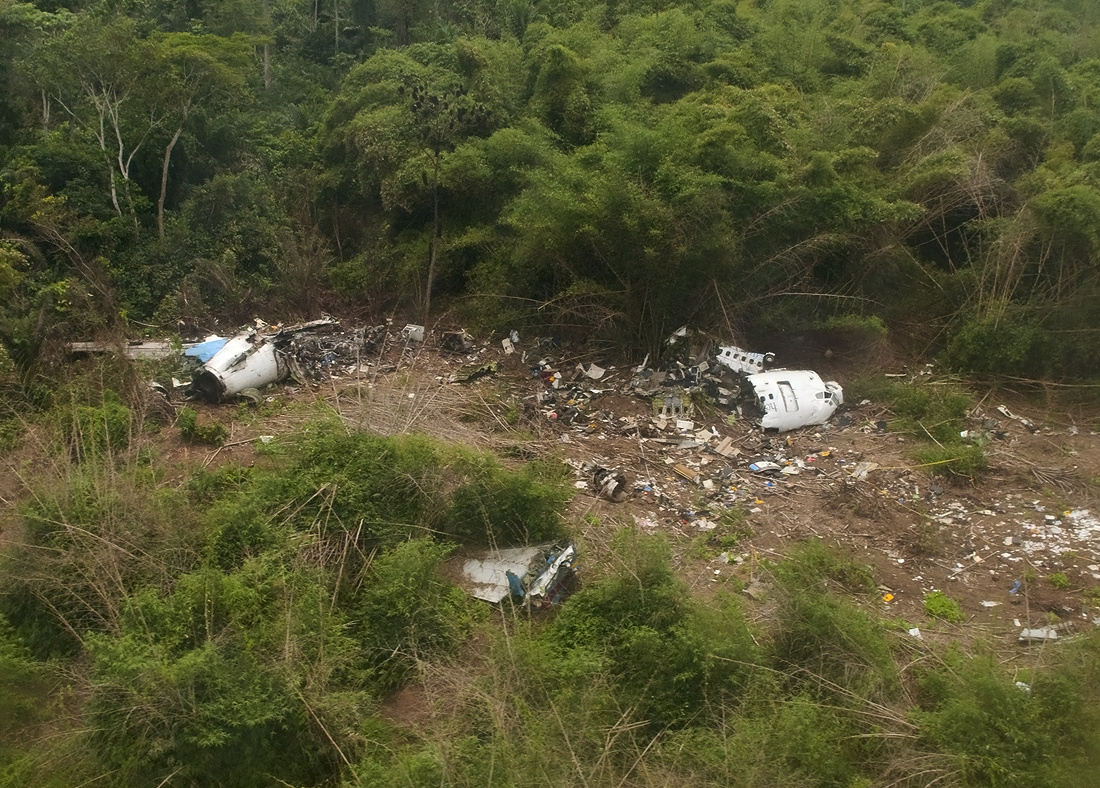
  Hewa Bora Airways Flight 952
- 8 July 2011 – Hewa Bora Airways Flight 952, a Boeing 727, crashed on approach to Kisangani Bangoka International Airport after the pilots had received incorrect weather information. 77 people were killed.
- 4 March 2013 – A Fokker 50 operating a cargo flight for Compagnie Africaine d'Aviation crashed on approach to Goma in poor weather. 6 of the 9 occupants were killed.
- 24 November 2019 – A Dornier 228 of Busy Bee Congo crashed shortly after takeoff from Goma International Airport following an engine failure. 21 of the 22 occupants were killed, as well as 6 on the ground.
- 17 November 2025 – AirJet Angola Flight 100, an Embraer ERJ-145, overran the runway and crashed on landing at Kolwezi Airport; all 29 on board escaped uninjured.

=== Djibouti ===
- 23 January 2001 – Yemenia Flight 448, a Boeing 727, was hijacked and made an emergency landing at Djibouti–Ambouli International Airport, where the flight crew overpowered the hijacker. No deaths occurred.

=== Egypt ===
- 1 September 1950 – TWA Flight 903, a Lockheed L-749, crashed during a forced emergency landing in the desert near Cairo after an engine caught fire and separated from the aircraft mid-flight. All 55 aboard were killed.
- 20 February 1956 – A Douglas DC-6 of Transports Aériens Intercontinentaux crashed northeast of Cairo International Airport. The aircraft suffered an altimeter failure, and the pilot was conducting an exam involving landing with limited visibility. 52 people were killed.
- 12 June 1961 – KLM Flight 823, a Lockheed L-188, crashed and burst into flames while on approach to Cairo International Airport, killing 20 people.
- 20 May 1965 – Pakistan International Airlines Flight 705 crashed while attempting to land at Cairo International Airport on 20 May 1965 when the pilot descended too quickly. Six passengers survived; the other 121 people aboard died.
- 18 March 1966 – United Arab Airlines Flight 749, an Antonov An-24, crashed around 5 km from Cairo Airport during a thunderstorm. All 30 people perished in the accident.
- 20 March 1969 – An Ilyushin Il-18 of United Arab Airlines crashed at Aswan International Airport. The aircraft banked to right, hit the runway, and burst into flames while attempting to land. 100 of 105 people on board were killed.
- 6 September 1970 – Pan Am Flight 93, a Boeing 747, was hijacked as a part of the Dawson's Field hijackings and flown to Beirut and then to Cairo. The aircraft was blown up by the hijackers seconds after the passengers were deplaned.
- 21 February 1973 – Libyan Arab Airlines Flight 114, a Boeing 727, was shot down by Israeli fighter jets after it entered Israeli-controlled airspace above the Sinai peninsula, and its pilots ignored instructions from the fighter pilots. Deaths were 108 of those aboard; one of the five survivors included the copilot.
- 10 July 1974 – A Tupolev Tu-154 of Egyptair crashed on a training flight near Cairo following a stall, killing all 6 crew.
- 23 August 1976 – EgyptAir Flight 321, a Boeing 737, was hijacked en route from Cairo to Luxor. The hijackers demanded to be flown to Libya, but agreed to continue to Luxor, where the aircraft was stormed and the hijackers were captured. No one was injured.
- 3 January 2004 – Flash Airlines Flight 604, a Boeing 737-300, lost control and crashed into the Red Sea shortly after takeoff from Sharm El Sheikh International Airport. The NTSB and BEA determined the pilots suffered spatial disorientation, but Egyptian authorities did not determine a cause.
- 29 July 2011 – EgyptAir Flight 667, a Boeing 777, suffered a cockpit fire on the ground originating from the pilots' emergency oxygen system. The aircraft was evacuated and 7 people were injured.
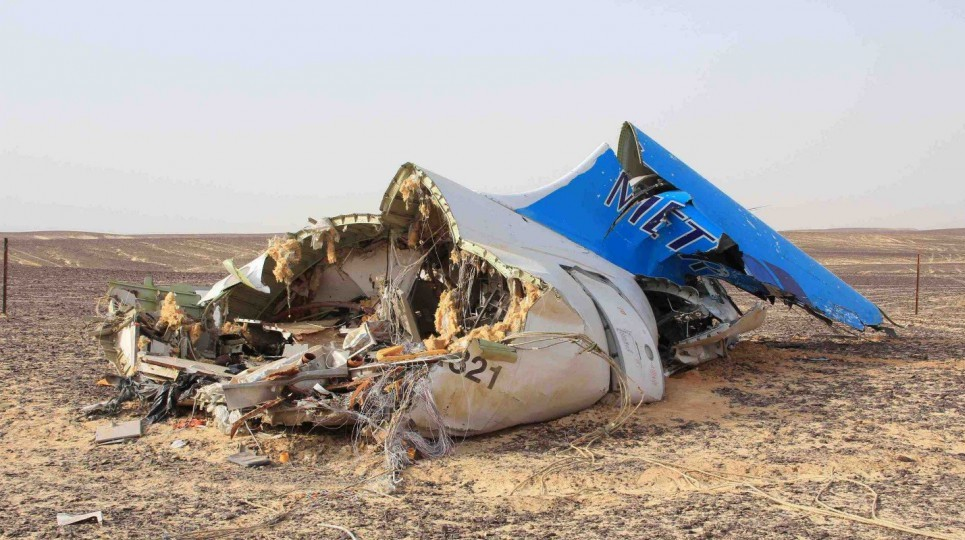
  The tail section of Metrojet flight 9268
- 31 October 2015 – **Metrojet Flight 9268**, an Airbus A321, was destroyed by a bomb planted by Islamic State over the Sinai Peninsula, killing all 224 people on board.

=== Equatorial Guinea ===
- 1 June 1976 – Aeroflot Flight 418, a Tupolev Tu-154A carrying 46 people, crashed into the mountain in Bioko. Everyone perished.
- 16 July 2005 – An Antonov An-24 of **Equatorial Express Airlines clipped some trees and crashed** due to being overloaded, killing all 60 on board.

=== Ethiopia ===
- 15 July 1960 – Ethiopian Air Lines Flight 372 crashed into a mountain south of Jimma, killing one on board.
- 8 December 1972 – Ethiopian Airlines Flight 708, a Boeing 720, was subject to an attempted hijacking soon after departure from Addis Ababa. In-flight security officers opened fire on the hijackers, and during the fight, a hand grenade exploded at the back of the aircraft, damaging major control systems of the aircraft. It made a safe landing at Addis Ababa, and the 7 hijackers were killed.
- 15 September 1988 – Ethiopian Airlines Flight 604, a Boeing 737, suffered multiple bird strikes and attempted an emergency landing at Bahir Dar. Upon landing, the plane caught fire, killing 35 people.
- 10 March 2019 – **Ethiopian Airlines Flight 302**, a Boeing 737 MAX 8, crashed shortly after takeoff from Addis Ababa Bole International Airport, killing all 157 people on board.

=== Ghana ===
- 2 June 2012 – **Allied Air Flight 111**, a Boeing 727, overran the runway and crashed into a perimeter fence, minibus, cyclist, and taxicab, resulting in 12 deaths on the ground. All four crew members survived.

=== Guinea ===
- 1 July 1983 – An Ilyushin Il-62 operating for the Civil Aviation Administration of Korea **crashed into the Guinean mountains** on approach to Conakry International Airport. All 23 occupants died.

=== Ivory Coast ===
- 3 January 1987 – Varig Flight 797, a Boeing 707, crashed into the jungle near Abidjan after engine failure on 3 January 1987. Of 51 on board, only a single passenger survived.
- 30 January 2000 – **Kenya Airways Flight 431**, an Airbus A310, crashed shortly after takeoff after the stall warning was falsely activated. In an effort to prevent a stall, the pilots pushed the yoke down, leading to a controlled flight into water. The accident killed 169 out of the 179 people on board.
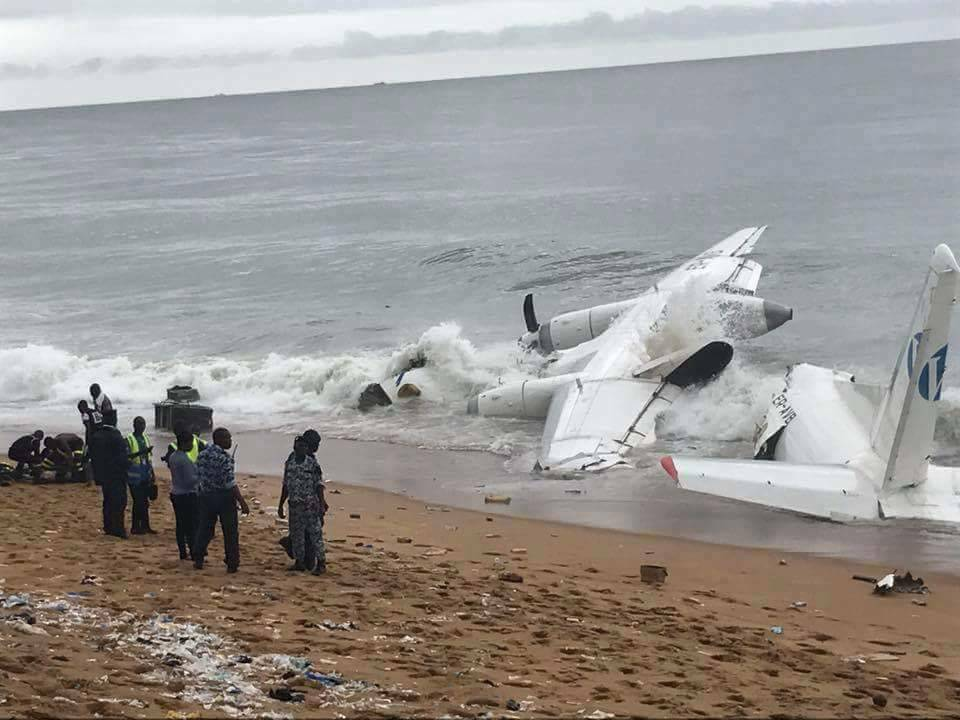
  Valan International Cargo Charter An-26
- 14 October 2017 – An Antonov An-26 operated by Valan International Cargo Charter crashed off the coast of Abidjan while approaching Félix-Houphouët-Boigny International Airport, killing 4 of the 10 people on board.

=== Kenya ===
- 20 November 1974 – **Lufthansa Flight 540**, a Boeing 747, stalled and crashed shortly after takeoff from Jomo Kenyatta International Airport in Nairobi. The investigation showed the leading-edge slats were kept in the retracted position. 59 of the 157 occupants were killed.
- 28 November 2002 – Two surface-to-air missiles were fired at an Arkia Boeing 757 departing from Mombasa. The missiles did not hit the aircraft, and it continued to Tel Aviv, escorted by Israeli fighter jets.
- 10 April 2006 – A Harbin Y-12 of the Kenya Air Force crashed into Mount Marsabit in poor weather, killing 14 of the 17 people on board. The official investigation blamed the pilots' decision to continue the approach at an unsafe altitude in poor visibility for the accident, but a report from The Standard alleged the pilot to be intoxicated.
- 5 June 2018 – Fly-SAX Flight 102, a Cessna 208, crashed into the Aberdare Mountain Range due to pilot and ATC error, killing all 10 on board.
- 5 March 2024 – Safarilink Aviation Flight 053, a Bombardier DHC-8-300, collided in mid-air with a Cessna 172 operated by 99 Flying School over Nairobi National Park. The Cessna crashed, killing both occupants, and flight 053 landed safely without casualties.
- 28 October 2025 – Mombasa Air Safari Flight 203, a Cessna Grand Caravan, crashed near Kwale, killing all 11 on board.

=== Liberia ===
- 22 June 1951 – Pan Am Flight 151, a Lockheed L-1049, crashed into a hill in Bong County on 22 June 1951 due to pilot error. All 40 on board were killed.
- 5 March 1967 – **Varig Flight 837**, a Douglas DC-8, crashed during the approach to Roberts International Airport near Monrovia. Of the 71 passengers and 19 crew on board, 50 passengers, and the flight engineer perished. In addition, five people on the ground were also killed. The aircraft caught fire and was written off. This is the deadliest aviation accident in Liberia.

=== Libya ===
- 9 August 1958 – Central African Airways Flight 890, a Vickers Viscount, crashed into high ground near Benina International Airport, killing 36 people. At the time, it was the deadliest plane crash in Libya. Pilot fatigue and indisposition were blamed.
- 2 December 1977 – A Tupolev Tu-154 leased to Libyan Arab Airlines from Balkan Bulgarian Airlines made a forced landing near Benghazi following fuel exhaustion. 59 people were killed.
- 27 July 1989 – Korean Air Flight 803, a McDonnell Douglas DC-10-30, crashed onto an orchard while on approach to Tripoli International Airport in thick fog and low visibility, killing 79 people. The cause was pilot error.
- 22 December 1992 – **Libyan Arab Airlines Flight 1103**, a Boeing 727 was approaching to Tripoli Airport when it collided with a Mig-23 fighter jet, killing all 157 people aboard the flight, while the two pilots of the fighter jet ejected and survived. The investigation blamed the accident on the fighter pilots, but some have contested this conclusion, claiming Muammar Gaddafi ordered the aircraft's destruction.
- 12 May 2010 – Afriqiyah Airways Flight 771, an Airbus A330, was on approach to Tripoli International Airport when it crashed to the ground in a nose-down attitude, slid, disintegrated, and exploded. Among the 104 aboard, one survived, nine-year-old Ruben van Assouw from the Netherlands.

=== Mali ===
- 22 February 1985 – An Antonov An-24 of Air Mali crashed during a sandstorm after takeoff from Timbuktu Airport, after suffering an engine failure. 51 of the 52 occupants were killed, including several members of the United Nations.
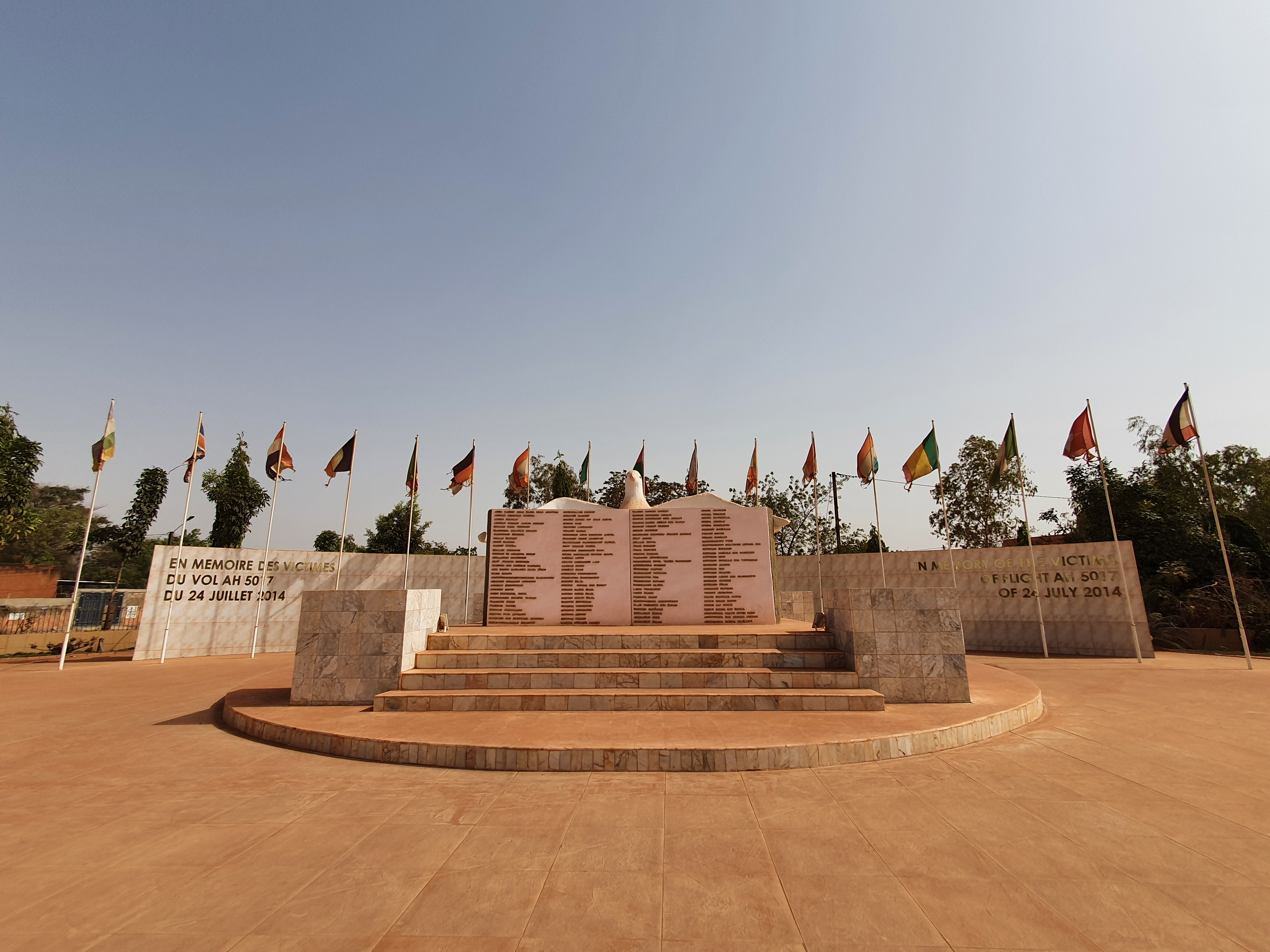
  Memorial to the victims of Air Algerie Flight 5017
- 24 July 2014 – **Air Algérie Flight 5017**, a McDonnell Douglas MD-83 operated by Swiftair, was traveling from Ouagadougou, Burkina Faso, to Algiers, Algeria, when it suddenly banked heavily to the left, spiraled, and crashed into a desert near Gossi, Mali. The flight was carrying 110 passengers and six crew, all of whom perished.

=== Mauritania ===
- 1 July 1994 – **Air Mauritanie Flight 625**, a Fokker F28 Fellowship, was carrying 93 people when it crashed into terrain in a sandstorm, killing 80 people.

=== Morocco ===
- 12 July 1961 – ČSA Flight 511, an Ilyushin Il-18 crashed near Casablanca Airport, killing all 72 on board.
- 12 September 1961 – Air France Flight 2005, a Sud Aviation Caravelle, was on approach to Rabat when it crashed to the ground, killing all 77 people on board.
- 1 April 1970 – A Royal Air Maroc Sud Aviation Caravelle crashed in Berrechid. 61 people were killed in the crash, and 4 more died in hospital later.
- 22 December 1973 – A Sud Aviation Caravelle operated by Sobelair for Royal Air Maroc crashed into Mount Mellanine on approach to Tangier. All 106 passengers and crew were killed.
- 3 August 1975 – A Royal Air Maroc Boeing 707-300 **crashed into a mountain** and exploded, killing all 188 people on board in Morocco's deadliest air disaster. The plane was totally destroyed.
- 21 August 1994 – Royal Air Maroc Flight 630, an ATR 42-312, was carrying 44 people while en route to Mohammed V Airport, when it was deliberately crashed by the pilot, killing all 44 on board.
- 25 September 1998 – PauknAir Flight 4101, a BAe 146, crashed in Boumahfouda while on approach to the Spanish exclave of Melilla. The crew descended below the minimum safe altitude and did not respond correctly to the ground proximity warning system. All 38 on board were killed.

=== Namibia ===
- 20 April 1968 – **South African Airways Flight 228**, a Boeing 707-300 named Pretoria crashed on 20 April 1968 shortly after takeoff from Windhoek, killing 123 people. The accident was attributed to pilot error and spatial disorientation, while also citing the lack of a GPWS system on the aircraft.
- 29 November 2013 – LAM Mozambique Airlines Flight 470, an Embraer E-190, crashed into the Bwabwata National Park in Namibia en route to Quatro de Fevereiro Airport, Angola. All 27 passengers and six crew on board were killed. The final report concluded that the pilot intentionally crashed the plane into terrain.

=== Niger ===
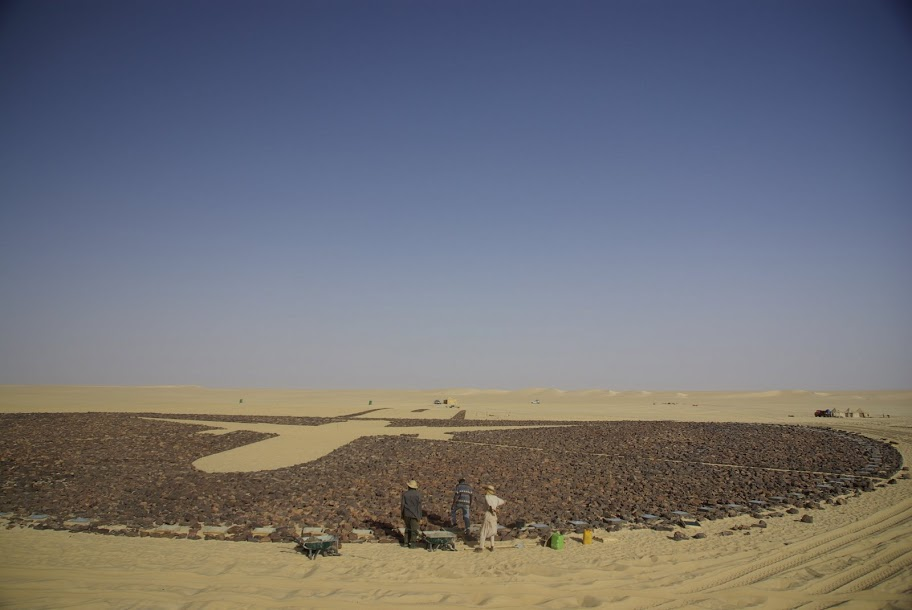
Memorial at the crash site of UTA Flight 772

- 19 September 1989 – **UTA Flight 772**, a McDonnell Douglas DC-10, was destroyed by a bomb over the Sahara. All 156 passengers and 14 crew members died, including the wife of the American ambassador to Chad. The investigation found that Libyan terrorists backed by the Libyan government smuggled a bomb in the cargo hold.
- 25 October 1993 – Nigeria Airways Flight 470, an Airbus A310, was hijacked in Nigerian airspace, and landed at Niamey Airport to refuel, as the hijackers planned to continue to Frankfurt. The aircraft was held in Niamey for 4 days, but 129 people were freed after just 2 hours of negotiations. After 4 days, the aircraft was invaded and the hijackers were arrested; one crew member was killed in the operation.

=== Nigeria ===
- 24 June 1956 – A BOAC Canadair C-4 crashed on takeoff from Kano Airport after encountering a microburst, killing 32 people.
- 20 November 1969 – Nigeria Airways Flight 825, a Vickers VC10, struck trees and exploded while on approach to Lagos International Airport, killing all 87 people on board.
- 22 January 1973 – A Boeing 707 operated by Alia Royal Jordanian for Nigeria Airways **crashed on landing** at Kano Airport in bad weather. The nose landing gear collapsed, followed by the right main gear. The aircraft spun 180°, left the runway, and burst into flames, killing 176.
- 28 November 1983 – Nigeria Airways Flight 250, a Fokker F28, crashed on approach to Akanu Ibiam International Airport in Enugu, killing 53.
- 13 November 1995 – Nigeria Airways Flight 357, a Boeing 737-2F9, was landing at Kaduna Airport, when it overran the runway and burst into flames, killing 11 people. The aircraft was destroyed by the flames.
- 7 November 1996 – ADC Airlines Flight 86, a Boeing 727, was in a collision course with another plane. The pilots averted the disaster by doing a drastic maneuver, but lost control and crashed, killing all 144 passengers and crew on board. The causes were air traffic control and pilot errors.
- 4 May 2002 – EAS Airlines Flight 4226, a BAC One-Eleven, overran the runway while taking off from Mallam Aminu Kano International Airport. The engine ingested a massive amount of dust, causing it to fail. The aircraft then crashed into a heavily populated residential area. Deaths included 73 people aboard the aircraft and at least 30 people on the ground, killing 103 in total.
- 22 October 2005 – Bellview Airlines Flight 210, a Boeing 737-200, nose-dived and crashed after takeoff from Lagos. All 117 passengers and crew on board were killed. The cause remains undetermined.
- 10 December 2005 – Sosoliso Airlines Flight 1145, a McDonnell Douglas DC-9, crash-landed on the runway at Port Harcourt International Airport due to pilot error, killing 108 of the 110 passengers and crew on board.
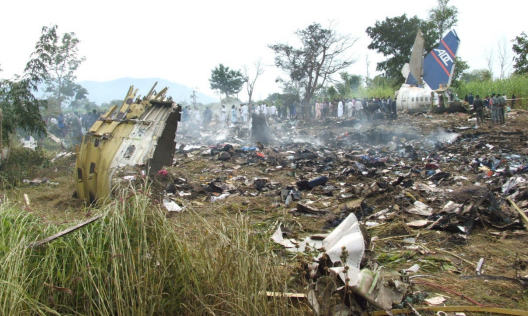
  The wreckage of ADC Airlines Flight 053
- 29 October 2006 – ADC Airlines Flight 53, a Boeing 737-200, crashed immediately after takeoff from Abuja due to wind shear and pilot error on 29 October 2006, killing 96 of the 105 passengers and crew on board.
- 3 June 2012 – Dana Air Flight 992, a McDonnell Douglas MD-83 suffered a dual engine failure on approach to Murtala Muhammed International Airport. The plane then slammed into a neighborhood in Lagos, killing all 153 passengers and crew on board, as well as 6 people on the ground.
- 3 October 2013 – Associated Aviation Flight 361, an Embraer EMB 120, crashed on takeoff from Murtala Muhammed International Airport following an engine failure on takeoff and pilot error. 16 of the 20 occupants were killed.

=== Republic of the Congo ===
- 21 March 2011 – An An-12 of Trans Air Congo nosedived and crashed into a densely populated neighbourhood in Pointe-Noire. All 4 crew members and 19 on the ground were killed.
- 30 November 2012 – An Il-76 operated by Air Highnesses on behalf of Aéro-Service **crashed short of the runway** at Maya-Maya Airport, Brazzaville. All 6 on board and 26 on the ground were killed.

=== Rwanda ===
- 12 November 2009 – **RwandAir Flight 205**, a Bombardier CRJ100ER operated by JetLink Express, crashed into the terminal building at Kigali International Airport, after an engine throttle became jammed requiring an emergency landing. One passenger was killed.

=== Senegal ===
- 29 August 1960 – **Air France Flight 343**, a Lockheed L-1049 crashed off the coast of Dakar following an aborted landing. All 63 on board were killed.
- 9 February 1992 – a Gambcrest Convair CV-640 crashed in Diouloulou, killing 31 of the 59 people on board.
- 5 September 2015 – The 2015 Senegal mid-air collision occurred when CEIBA Intercontinental Flight 071, a Boeing 737-800, collided with a British Aerospace 125 air ambulance operated by Senegalair. The winglet of the Boeing struck the fuselage of the HS-125, causing a decompression and incapacitating the crew. The plane continued to fly for almost an hour before running out of fuel and crashing into the ocean, killing all 7 on board. The CEIBA flight landed safely at Malabo with no casualties.

=== Sierra Leone ===
- 3 June 2007 – A Mil Mi-8 helicopter of Paramount Airlines **crashed** in Lungi, killing all 22 on board.

=== Somalia ===
- 20 July 1981 – **Somali Airlines Flight 40**, a Fokker F27, encountered violent turbulence a few minutes after taking off from Mogadishu. The plane shook violently, went into a spiral dive, and lost control after its right wing separated. It then crashed near Balad, killing all 50 people on board.
- 23 March 2007 – An Ilyushin Il-76 operated by TransAVIAexport Airlines crashed in Mogadishu, killing all 11 on board. The aircraft was allegedly shot down.
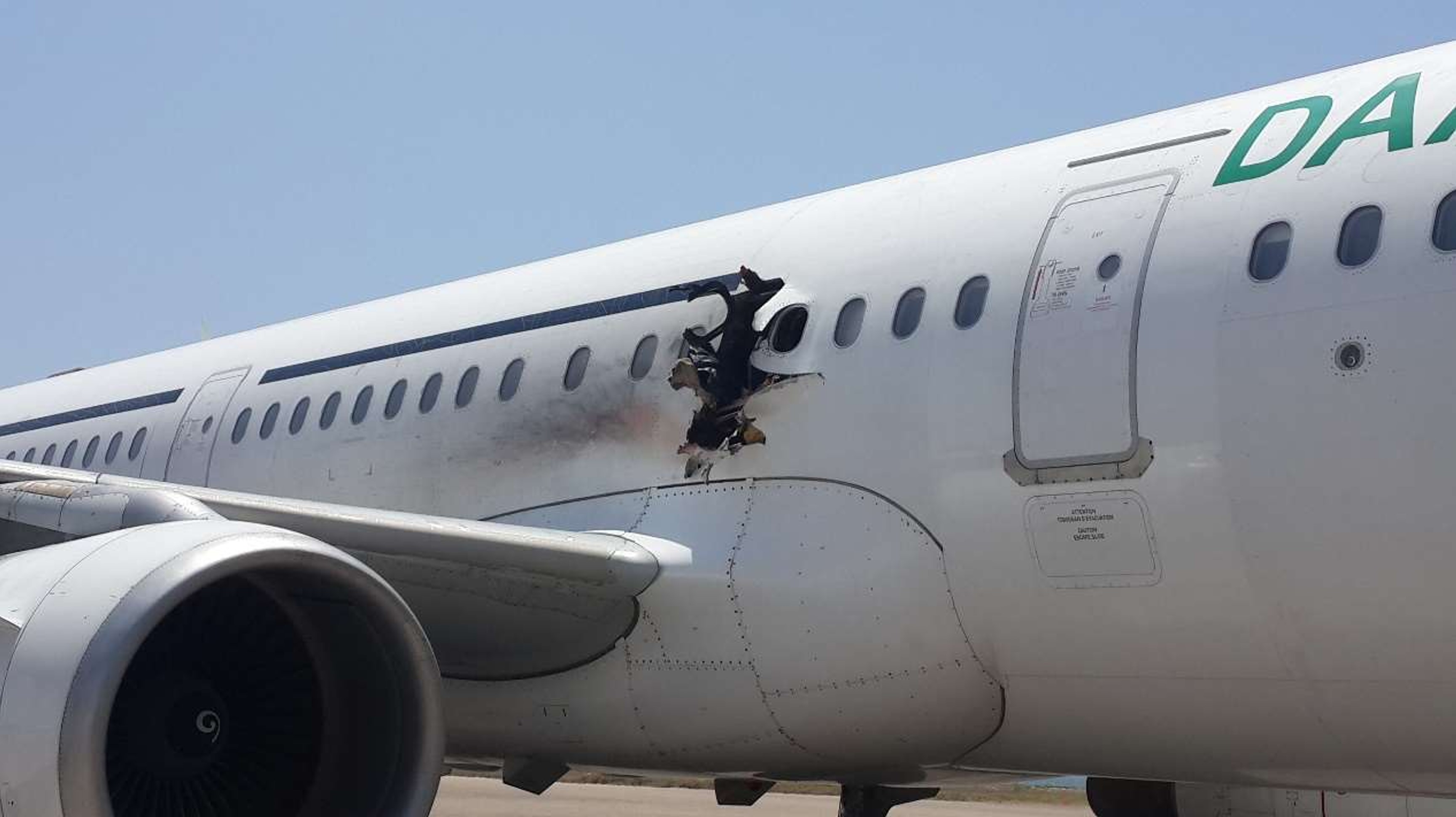
  Damage to Daallo Airlines Flight 159
- 2 February 2016 – Daallo Airlines Flight 159, an Airbus A321, was en route to Djibouti when a part of its cabin exploded shortly after taking off from Mogadishu's Aden Adde International Airport. Two injuries were reported. A passenger was sucked out from the aircraft, and his body was found near Balad – he was believed to be the bomber.
- 4 May 2020 – An Embraer EMB-120 Brasilia operated by East African Express Airways crashed killing all 6 on board, allegedly due to a shootdown.

=== South Africa ===
- 13 March 1967 – South African Airways Flight 406, a Vickers Viscount, crashed into the Eastern Cape after the pilot suffered a fatal heart attack while on approach to East London, South Africa. All 25 aboard were killed.

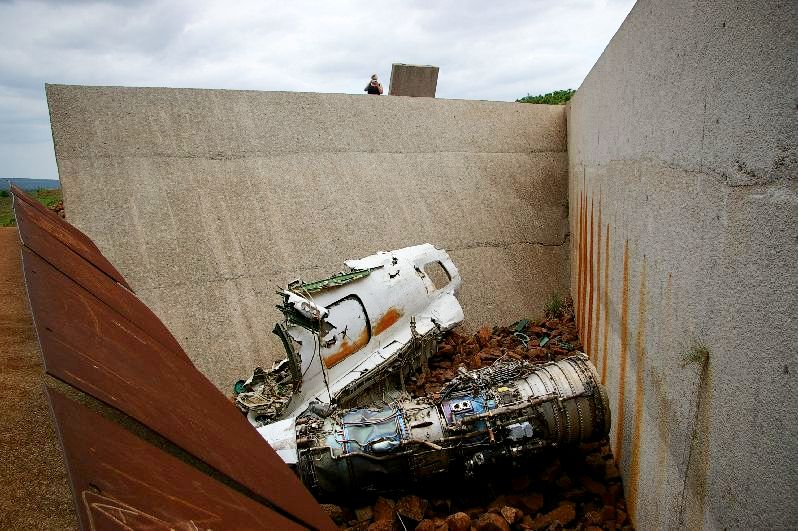
Wreckage of the plane crash that killed President Samora Machel

- 19 October 1986 – A Tupolev Tu-134 carrying President of Mozambique Samora Machel **crashed into terrain** while en route to Maputo, killing 34. Machel was among the dead.
- 1 March 1988 – Comair Flight 206, an Embraer EMB 110, breaks up on approach to Johannesburg due to a bomb, killing all 17 on board.
- 24 September 2009 – SA Airlink Flight 8911, a BAe Jetstream 41 crash lands on a sports field after an engine failure, killing 1 on board.

=== South Sudan ===
- 16 August 1986 – a Fokker F-27 of Sudan Airways was **shot down** by Sudan People's Liberation Army. The plane disintegrated and crashed near Malakai. All 60 on board were killed.
- 12 February 1998 – a Sudanese Air Force Antonov An-32 overran the runway at Nasir Airport, killing 26 people.
- 21 December 2012 – Nizhnevartovskavia Flight 544, a Mil Mi-8 helicopter operated on behalf of United Nations, was shot down in a friendly fire incident from the South Sudanese Army, killing all 4 on board.
- 4 November 2015 – an Antonov An-12 operated by Allied Services crashed near Juba International Airport, killing 37. A Russian source stated the aircraft may have been overloaded.
- 9 September 2018 – a Let L-410 operated by Slaver Kompani on behalf of South West Aviation crashed into Lake Yirol on approach to Yirol Airport, killing 20 of the 23 people on board.
- 22 August 2020 – an Antonov An-26 of South West Aviation crashed on takeoff from Juba International Airport for unknown reasons. 8 of the 9 on board were killed.
- 2 March 2021 – a South Sudan Supreme Airlines Let L-410 suffered a dual engine failure and crashed near Pieri Airstrip in Uror County. All 10 on board were killed.
- 29 January 2025 – a Beechcraft 1900 operated by Eagle Air on behalf of Light Air Services crashed shortly after takeoff from the airstrip at Unity oilfield in Rubkona, killing 20 of the 21 people on board.

=== Sudan ===
- 29 December 2000 – British Airways Flight 2069, a Boeing 747-400, was subject to an attempted hijacking above Sudan. A passenger stormed the cockpit and grabbed the yoke, causing the autopilot to disconnect and a struggle to break out between the hijacker and pilot. This caused the aircraft to climb sharply, stall and then plunge towards the ground. The aircraft was recovered and landed safely at Nairobi. 5 people were injured during the erratic movements.
- 8 July 2003 – **Sudan Airways Flight 139**, a Boeing 737-200, crashed in Port Sudan, killing 116 of the 117 aboard. The flight crew was not able to see the runway in the low visibility, and crashed when attempting a missed approach. A toddler was the only survivor.
- 10 June 2008 – Sudan Airways Flight 109, an Airbus A310, crashed, broke apart, and caught fire upon landing at Khartoum. The aircraft had been dispatched with its port engine thrust reverser deactivated. This condition caused it to veer to the right when the captain activated reverse thrust in both engines to stop the aircraft within 2,080 meters (6,820 ft) of runway left. Thirty people were confirmed dead.
- 11 November 2010 – an Antonov An-24 of Tarco Air crashed on landing at Zalingei Airport due to pilot error, killing 2 passengers.
- 19 August 2012 – an Antonov An-26 operated by Alfa Airlines crashed into the Nuba Mountains on approach to Talodi, killing all 32 on board.
- 3 May 2025 – a Boeing 737-200 was destroyed on the ground at Nyala Airport by the Sudanese Armed Forces, killing 54 people.

=== Tanzania ===
- 18 May 1955 – **East African Airways Flight 104**, a DC-3, crashed into Mount Kilimanjaro, killing all 20 on board.
- 6 November 2022 – Precision Air Flight 494, an ATR 42, crashed into Lake Victoria while attempting to land at Bukoba Airport in bad weather. 19 people were killed.

=== Tunisia ===
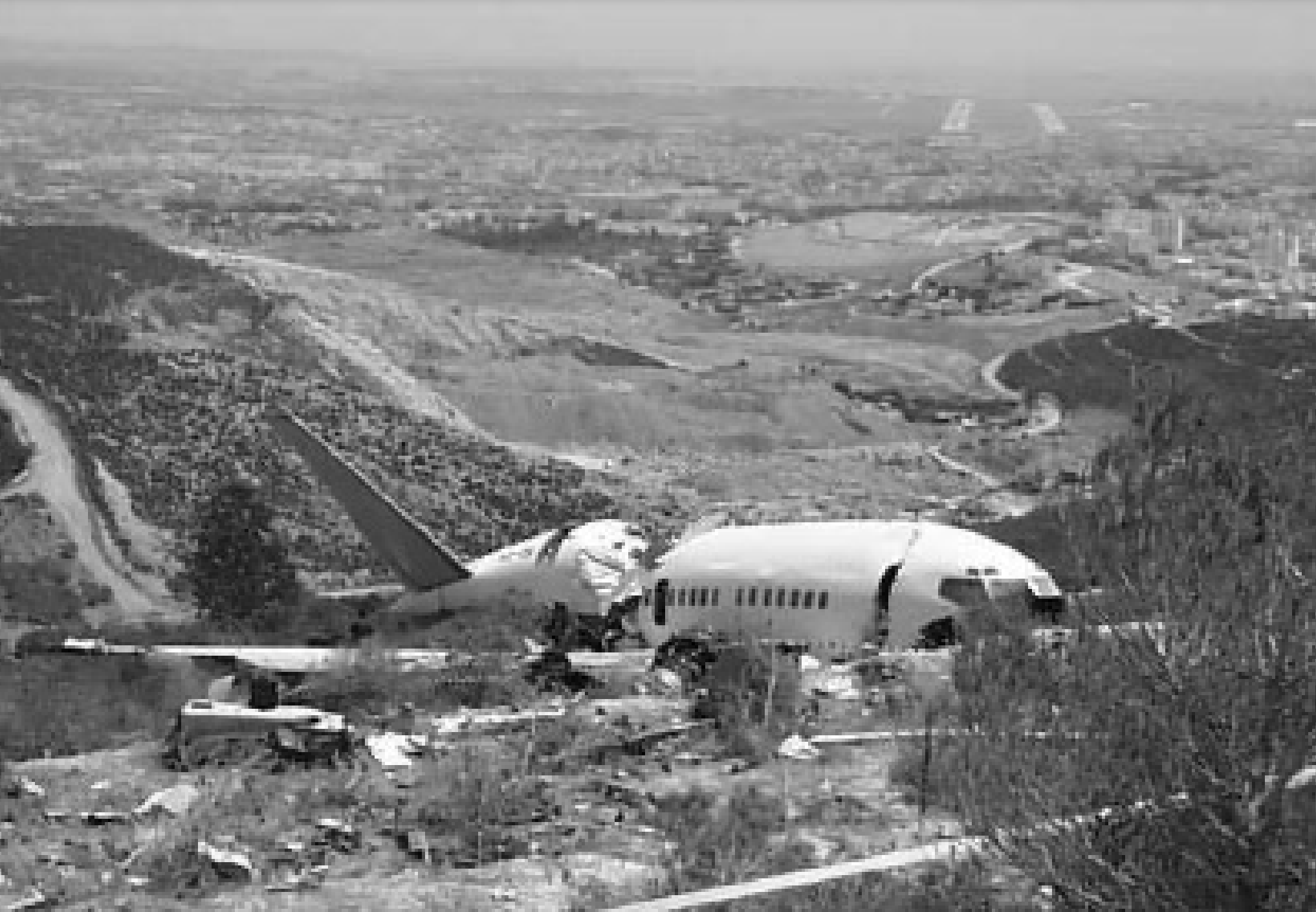
The wreckage of Egyptair flight 843

- 7 May 2002 – **EgyptAir Flight 843**, a Boeing 737 carrying 62 people, was on approach to Tunisia's capital Tunis when it crashed into a nearby hill. The aircraft broke up, killing 14 people.

=== Zambia ===
- 18 September 1961 – a Transair Sweden DC-6 operating for the United Nations **crashed on approach** to Ndola Airport. The crash killed all 16 on board, including the second secondary-general of the UN Dag Hammarskjöld. Official inquiries cited pilot error as the cause, but many allegations of a shoot-down have been made.
- 14 May 1977 – a Dan-Air Boeing 707 operating on behalf of IAS Cargo Airlines and Zambia Airways suffered a structural failure and crashed near Lusaka Airport, killing all 6 on board. The right horizontal stabilizer had detached from the aircraft while on approach, causing a loss of control. Metal fatigue and design flaw was blamed for the crash.

=== Zimbabwe ===
- 3 September 1978 – Air Rhodesia Flight 825, a Vickers Viscount, was shot down by Zimbabwe People's Revolutionary Army (ZIPRA). Initially, 18 people survived the crash, but the ZIPRA guerrillas massacred 10 people.
- 12 February 1979 – **Air Rhodesia Flight 827**, a Vickers Viscount, also was shot down by ZIPRA guerrillas; all 59 passengers and crew on board died.

== Antarctica ==
- 28 November 1979 – **Air New Zealand Flight 901,** a McDonnell Douglas DC-10, crashed into the side of Mount Erebus, Antarctica, on 28 November 1979 for various reasons including pilot error, maintenance crew error, and whiteout conditions. All 257 aboard died.

== Asia ==
=== Afghanistan ===
- 4 September 1985 – A Bakhtar Afghan Airlines Antonov An-26 was shot down by a ground-to-air missile; all 52 on board were killed.
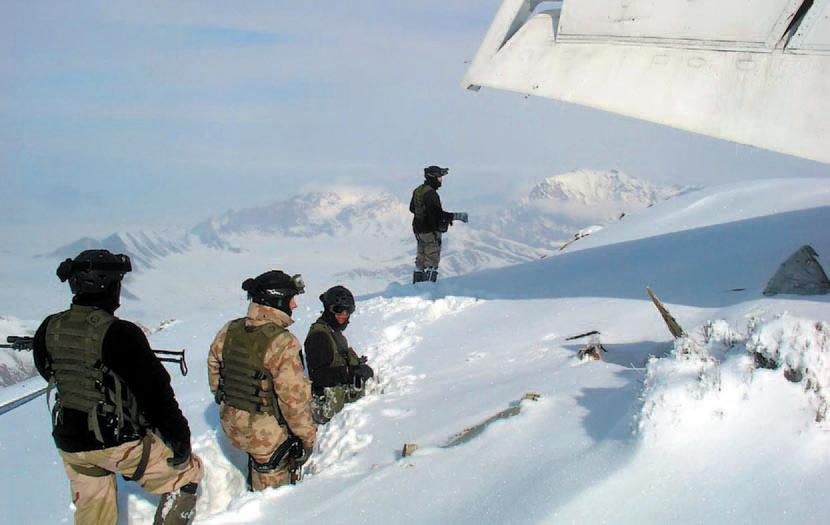
  Rescuers at the crash site of Kam Air Flight 904. The tail of the plane is on the right.
- 19 March 1998 – An Ariana Afghan Airlines Boeing 727-228 crashes into a mountain, killing all 45 aboard.
- 3 February 2005 – **Kam Air Flight 904**, a Boeing 737-200, crashed in the Pamir Mountains for undetermined reasons. All 105 people on board were killed.
- 17 May 2010 – Pamir Airways Flight 112, an Antonov An-24, crashed in northern Afghanistan, killing 43 or 44 people.
- 6 July 2011 – Silk Way Airlines Flight 995, an Ilyushin Il-76, crashes into a mountain on approach to Bagram Airfield, killing all 9 aboard.
- 29 April 2013 – National Airlines Flight 102, a Boeing 747-428BCF, crashes after takeoff from Bagram Airfield. All 7 crew members are killed. The rope that secured the cargo snapped. The cargo managed to shift and slammed onto the rear bulkhead, causing the plane to lose its control.
- 18 May 2016 – A Silk Way Airlines Antonov An-12 overran the runway at Dwyer Airport due to engine failure, killing 7.

=== Armenia ===
- 18 July 1981 – The 1981 Armenia mid-air collision occurred when a Canadair CL-44 operated by Transporte Aéreo Rioplatense collided with a Soviet Air Defence Forces Sukhoi Su-15 near Yerevan. The Canadair had strayed into Soviet airspace, and the Sukhoi was scrambled to intercept it. The Soviet pilot claims the collision was a deliberate attempt to down the Canadair, but Western experts believe this is untrue. All 4 on board the Canadair were killed, but the Sukhoi pilot ejected safely.
- 26 December 1993 – **Kuban Airlines Flight 5719**, an Antonov An-26, stalled and crashed during a go-around at Gyumri Shirak International Airport, killing 35 of the 36 on board. The aircraft was found to be overloaded.
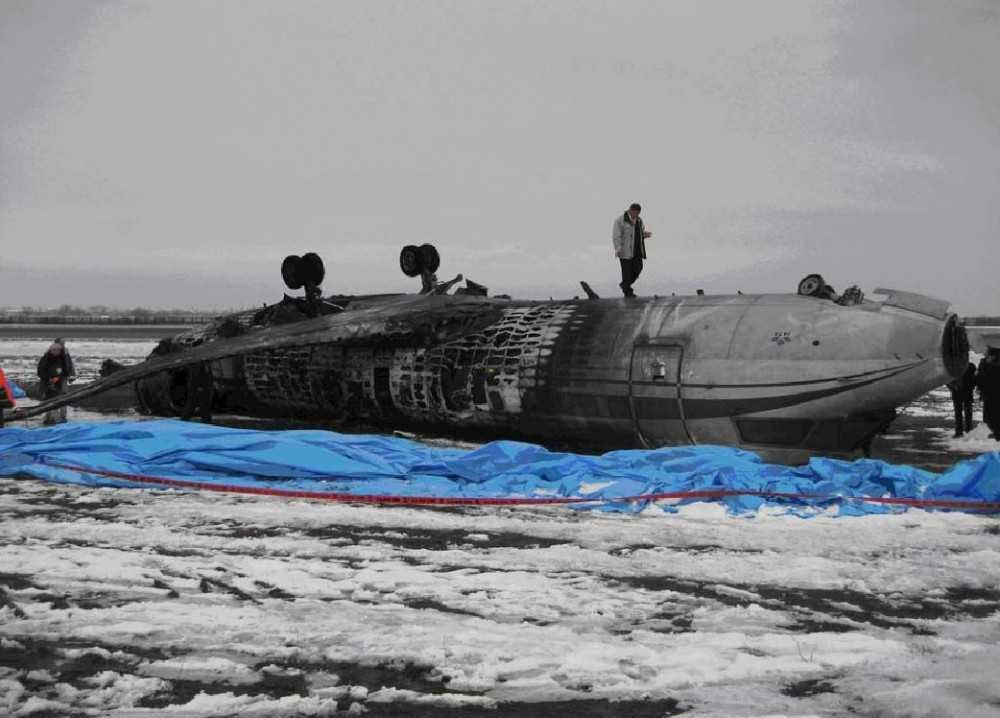
  Belavia Flight 1834
- 14 February 2008 – Belavia Flight 1834, a Bombardier CRJ100ER, crashed during takeoff from Yerevan's Zvartnots International Airport after suffering mechanical failure due to icing. There were no casualties.

=== Azerbaijan ===
- 12 October 1948 – an Aeroflot Ilyushin Il-12 disappeared in the Main Caucasian Range. The plane and its 10 occupants were never found.
- 23 April 1966 – Aeroflot Flight 2723, an Ilyushin Il-14, ditched in the Caspian Sea following engine problems. The aircraft was found roughly 20 km south of Boyuk Zira, with no survivors among the 33 occupants.
- 18 August 1973 – **Aeroflot Flight A-13**, an Antonov An-24B crashed on takeoff from Baku due to engine failure, killing 56.
- 5 December 1995 – Azerbaijan Airlines Flight 56 – Shortly after taking off from Nakhchivan Airport, the Tupolev Tu-134's no. 1 engine failed. The pilots seemed to misread it as a failure on engine no 2. Therefore, they shut down engine no 2. After realizing their failure, the pilots gave full power to engine no 2. But the engine had already stopped. The plane banked heavily and crashed into a field. Fifty-two people were killed.
- 23 December 2005 – Azerbaijan Airlines Flight 217 – The Antonov An-140 suffered an instrument failure. While it was returning to Baku, the plane crashed into a beach. All 23 people on board were killed in the disaster.

=== Bahrain ===
- Air France Douglas DC-4 accidents: On 12 June 1950, a flight from Saigon to Paris crashed in the Persian Gulf while on approach to Bahrain International Airport killing 46 of the 52 on board. Two days later, a second Douglas DC-4 operating on the same flight route, crashed in the Persian Gulf while on approach to Bahrain International Airport, killing 40 of 53 on board.
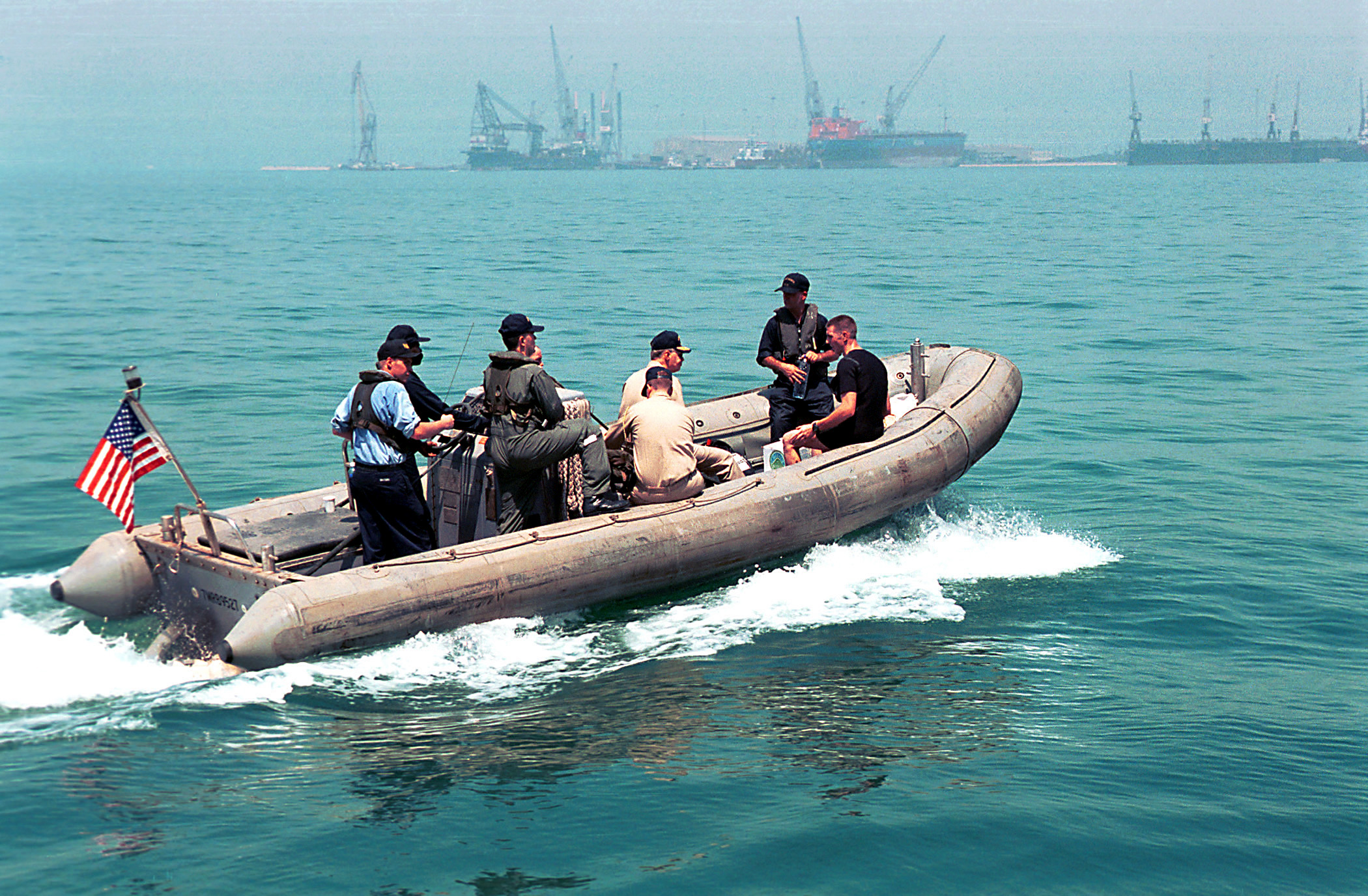
  Search efforts for Gulf Air Flight 072
- 23 August 2000 – **Gulf Air Flight 072**, an Airbus A320, crashed in the Persian Gulf while on approach to Bahrain International Airport on 23 August 2000, due to pilot error and spatial disorientation, killing all 143 people on board.

=== Bangladesh ===
- 2 February 1966 – Pakistan International Airlines Flight 17, a Sikorsky S-61 helicopter, crashed following a mechanical failure near Faridpur, killing 23 of 24 occupants.
- 28 September 1977 – Japan Airlines Flight 472, a Japan Airlines Douglas DC-8 is hijacked. Everyone survives.
- 5 August 1984 – **Biman Bangladesh Airlines Flight 426**, a Fokker F27, crashed into a marsh near Zia International Airport (now Shahjalal International Airport) in Dhaka, Bangladesh while landing in poor weather. With a total death toll of 49 people, it is the deadliest aviation disaster to occur on Bangladeshi soil and also the airline's worst accident.
- 9 March 2016 – True Aviation Flight 21, an Antonov An-26, crashes into the Bay of Bengal following engine failure on takeoff from Cox's Bazar International Airport, killing 3.

=== Cambodia ===
- 25 June 2007 – PMTair Flight 241, an Antonov An-24B carrying 22 people, crashed and burst into flames in upside-down condition. No one survived. An official investigation by the Cambodian Government blamed pilot error.
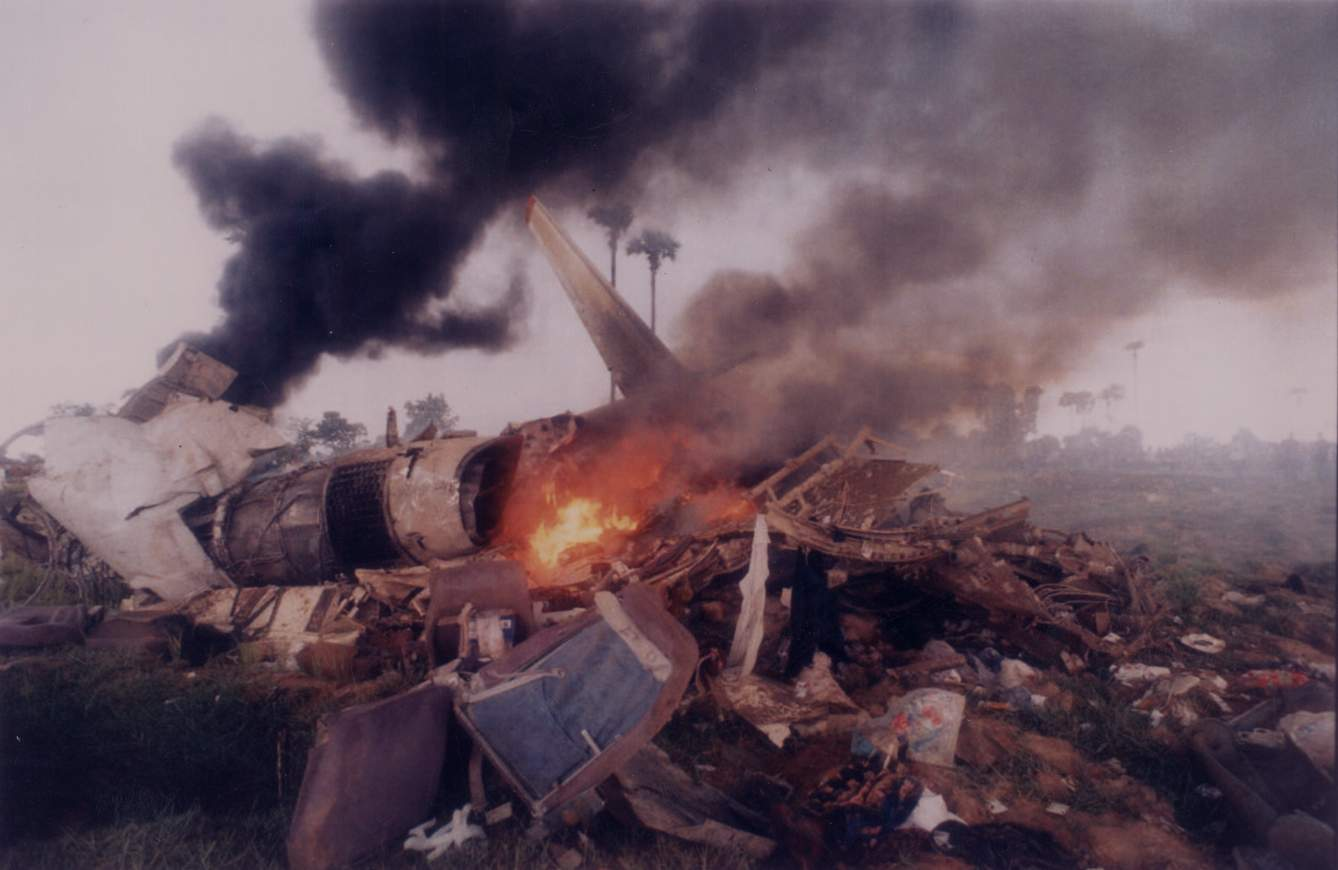
  Vietnam Airlines Flight 815
- 3 September 1997 – **Vietnam Airlines Flight 815**, a Tupolev Tu-134B-3, crashed and skidded over dry rice paddies and exploded 800 meters from the runway. Only one of the 66 on board survived. The first officer and the flight engineer had warned the captain twice to abort the landing. An official investigation blamed pilot error.

=== China ===
- 31 March 1922 – A Beijing-Han Airlines Handley Page O/7 crashes struck trees and crashed upon landing. All 14 on board died.
- 19 November 1931 – a China Airways Federal Stinson Detroiter crashed in Jinan. All 3 on board were killed.
- 24 August 1938 – A China National Aviation Corporation Douglas DC-2 was shot down by Japanese aircraft, killing 14.
- 25 December 1946 – the Black Christmas disaster occurred when 3 separate flights crashed at Shanghai Longhua Airport. The flights involved were Central Air Transport Corporation flight 48 (Douglas C-47), China National Aviation Corporation flight 140 (Douglas DC-3) and China National Aviation Corporation flight 115 (Curtiss C-46). 74 deaths occurred in total, including 3 on the ground. Extremely poor visibility conditions were cited as the primary cause for the sequence of accidents.
- 16 July 1948 – Miss Macao, a Cathay Pacific Consolidated PBY Catalina operated by Macau Air Transport Company, became the first commercial aircraft to be hijacked. The aircraft crashed after the pilot was shot while resisting the attackers, killing 25. The only survivor was the lead hijacker.
- 23 July 1954 – A Cathay Pacific Airways Douglas C-54A-10-DC Skymaster was shot down, killing 10.
- 26 April 1982 – CAAC Flight 3303, a Hawker Siddeley Trident, while on approach to Guilin Qifengling Airport, crashed into a mountain in heavy rain near Yangshuo, killing all 112 people on board.
- 17 September 1982 – Japan Air Lines Flight 792, a Douglas DC-8, makes an emergency landing at Shanghai Hongqiao Airport after a hydraulic failure. The aircraft overran the runway, causing 39 injuries.
- 24 December 1982 – CAAC Flight 2311, a CAAC Airlines Ilyushin Il-18D was destroyed by fire after landing, killing 25.
- 14 September 1983 – A CAAC Airlines Hawker Siddeley Trident and a PLAAF Harbin H-5 collided at Guilin Qifengling Airport, killing at least 11.
- 18 January 1985 – CAAC Flight 5109, an Antonov An-24, stalled and crashed in Jinan, killing 38.
- 18 January 1988 – China Southwest Airlines Flight 4146's engine No. 4 detached due to an in-flight fire causing a loss of control, killing all 108 on board.
- 15 August 1989 – China Eastern Airlines Flight 5510, an An-24, suffered an engine failure on takeoff from Shanghai Hongqiao International Airport. The aircraft crashed killing 34 people.
- 2 October 1990 – In the 1990 Guangzhou Baiyun airport collisions, Xiamen Airlines Flight 8301, a Boeing 737, was hijacked while attempting to land. It sideswiped a Boeing 707, then the aircraft crashed into a Boeing 757. 128 people died in the incident.
- 31 July 1992 – China General Aviation Flight 7552, a Yakovlev Yak-42, lost control upon take-off and crashes into a pond nearby, killing 107 people.
- 24 November 1992 – China Southern Airlines Flight 3943, a Boeing 737-300, was descending when the flight crew accidentally caused an engine thrust asymmetry. The plane rolled to the right and lost control, then it crashed into a mountain near Guilin. All 141 on board died.
- 23 July 1993 – China Northwest Airlines Flight 2119, a BAe 146, suffers a right-side flap actuator failure while rolling for takeoff at Yinchuan Hedong International Airport, causing the flaps to retract. The crew aborted the take-off, and the plane overran the runway and crashed into a lake, killing 55 people.
- 26 October 1993 – China Eastern Airlines Flight 5398, a McDonnell Douglas MD-82, overran the runway during an attempted go-around and stops in a pond. 2 people died.
- 13 November 1993 – China Northern Airlines Flight 6901, a McDonnell Douglas MD-82, crashed on approach to Ürümqi Diwopu International Airport. The pilots received a "pull up!" alert; rather than pulling the nose up, the captain asked the first officer the meaning of the word. The plane crashed into terrain, killing 12 people.
- 6 June 1994 – **China Northwest Airlines Flight 2303**, a Tupolev Tu-154M, was climbing when the autopilot responsible for the bank and yaw control malfunctioned, causing subsequent loss of control. The aircraft overstressed, and the airframe could not handle the pressure. It broke up in mid-air and crashed near Xi'an. 160 people were killed.
- 8 May 1997 – China Southern Airlines Flight 3456, a Boeing 737-300, was on approach to Shenzhen. After two failed landing attempts, the pilots tried a third attempt. It crashed into terrain and broke up in severe weather conditions. 35 people were killed. Pilot error was the cause of the accident.
- 24 February 1999 – China Southwest Airlines Flight 4509, a Tupolev Tu-154M, lost pitch control and dived, leading to an in-flight breakup, killing 61. The loss of control was caused by poor maintenance.
- 15 April 1999 – Korean Air Cargo Flight 6316, an MD-11, nosedived into the town of Xinzhuang due to pilot error. 8 people were killed, including 5 on the ground.
- 22 June 2000 – Wuhan Airlines Flight 343, a Xian Y-7 carrying 42 people, was struck by lightning and crashed into a village, killing 49 people including 7 on the ground.
- 7 May 2002 – China Northern Airlines Flight 6136, an MD-82, took off when one of its passengers, Zhen Piling, set fire on board. The fire spread, causing the aircraft to lose control and crash into Bohai Bay. All 103 passengers and 9 crew were killed in the incident.
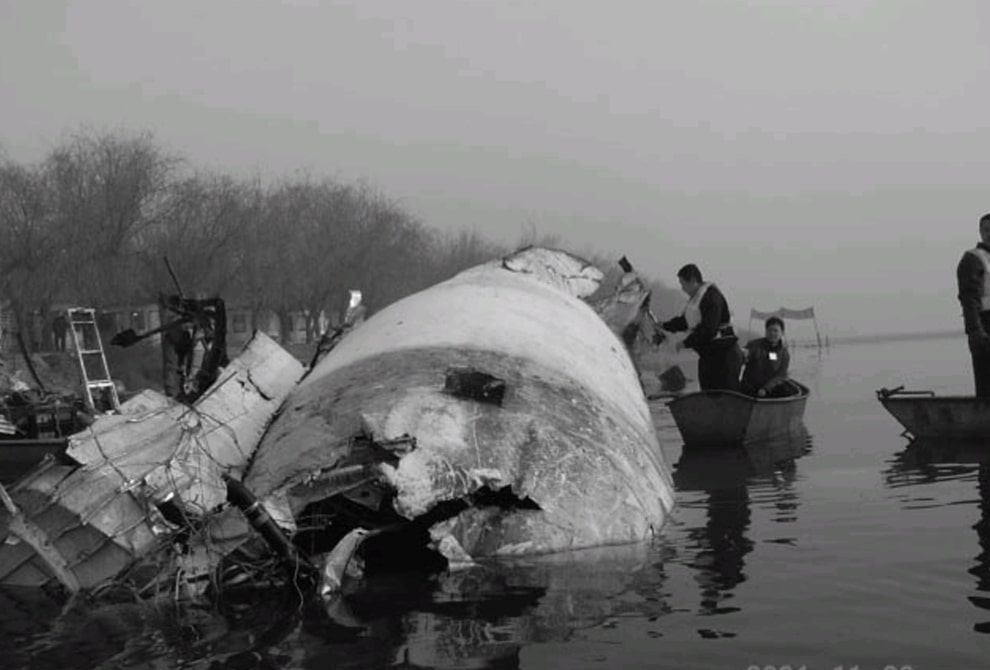
  China Eastern Flight 5210
- 21 November 2004 – China Eastern Airlines Flight 5210, a CRJ200, was taking off when suddenly it crashed into a park, killing all 53 people on board and 2 on the ground. The cause of the accident was ice accumulation on the wings.
- 28 November 2009 – Avient Aviation Flight 324, a McDonnell Douglas MD-11F, crashes on takeoff due to an improper flap and slat setting, killing 3.
- 24 August 2010 – Henan Airlines Flight 8387 an Embraer E-190 carrying 96 people was approaching Lindu Airport when it crashed into terrain and burst into flames. 44 people were killed, the other 52 survivors were injured. The crew ignored the safety rules while landing in foggy conditions.
- 29 June 2012 – Tianjin Airlines Flight 7554, an Embraer E-190, was the subject of a hijacking attempt. The hijackers were successfully restrained and the aircraft successfully returned to its departure airport of Hotan Kungang Airport. Two hijackers later died from injuries sustained in the fight on board.
- 20 July 2016 – Joy General Aviation Flight 6005, a Cessna 208, crashed into a bridge on the Shanghai-Hangzhou Highway near Shanghai. 5 of the 10 on board were killed.
- 14 May 2018 – Sichuan Airlines Flight 8633, an Airbus A319, suffered an explosive decompression over Xiaojin County. A windshield panel blew out, partially ejecting the first officer from the aircraft. He was eventually pulled back into the cockpit and the aircraft made a safe landing at Chengdu Shuangliu International Airport. Both pilots sustained injuries.
- 8 January 2022 – Aviastar-TU Flight 6534, a Tupolev Tu-204C suffered a ground fire during pushback at Hangzhou Xiaoshan International Airport. The fire was attributed to an oxygen leak in the cockpit. All 8 crew were able to evacuate.
- 21 March 2022 – China Eastern Airlines Flight 5735, a Boeing 737-800, nosedived into the ground at Teng County, killing all 123 passengers and 9 crew members on board.
- 12 May 2022 – Tibet Airlines Flight 9833, an Airbus A319, aborted take-off from Chongqing, veered off the runway and burst into flame. All 122 occupants evacuated safely.

=== Georgia ===
- 10 June 1960 – Aeroflot Flight 207, an Ilyushin Il-14M, crashes in the mountain of Recch. All 24 passengers and 7 crew died.
- 28 July 1962 – Aeroflot Flight 415, an Antonov An-10, crashed near Gagra while on approach to Sochi International Airport, Russia, killing all 81 on board.
- 24 August 1963 – Aeroflot Flight 663, an Ilyushin Il-14, crashed into a mountain south of Martvili, killing all 32 on board.
- 15 October 1970 – Aeroflot Flight 244, an Antonov An-24B, was hijacked on 15 October 1970. 1 flight attendant died and 3 others were injured in the shoot-out. The aircraft was flown to Trabzon, Turkey, where the hijackers surrendered.
- 18 November 1983 – Aeroflot Flight 6833, a Tupolev Tu-134-A operated by Aeroflot was hijacked. 7 people die.
- 20 July 1992 – A Tupolev Tu-154B crashed during takeoff at Tbilisi International Airport, killing all 24 on board and 4 on the ground.
- 1993 Sukhumi airliner attacks
  - 20 September 1993 – A Transair Georgia Tupolev Tu-134 was shot down on approach to Sukhumi Babushara Airport. All 27 on board were killed.
  - 21 September 1993 – an **Orbi Georgian Airways Tupolev Tu-154 was shot down** on approach to Sukhumi Babushara Airport. 108 people were killed.
  - 23 September 1993 – a Transair Georgia Tu-134 was shot at during boarding at Sukhumi Babushara Airport. 1 person was killed.

=== Hong Kong ===
- 30 June 1967 – **Thai Airways International Flight 601,** a Sud Aviation Caravelle, undershoots the runway on landing and impacts water, killing 24.
- 31 August 1988 – CAAC Flight 301, a Hawker Siddeley Trident, clipped approach lights and overran the runway at Kai Tak Airport, killing seven people.
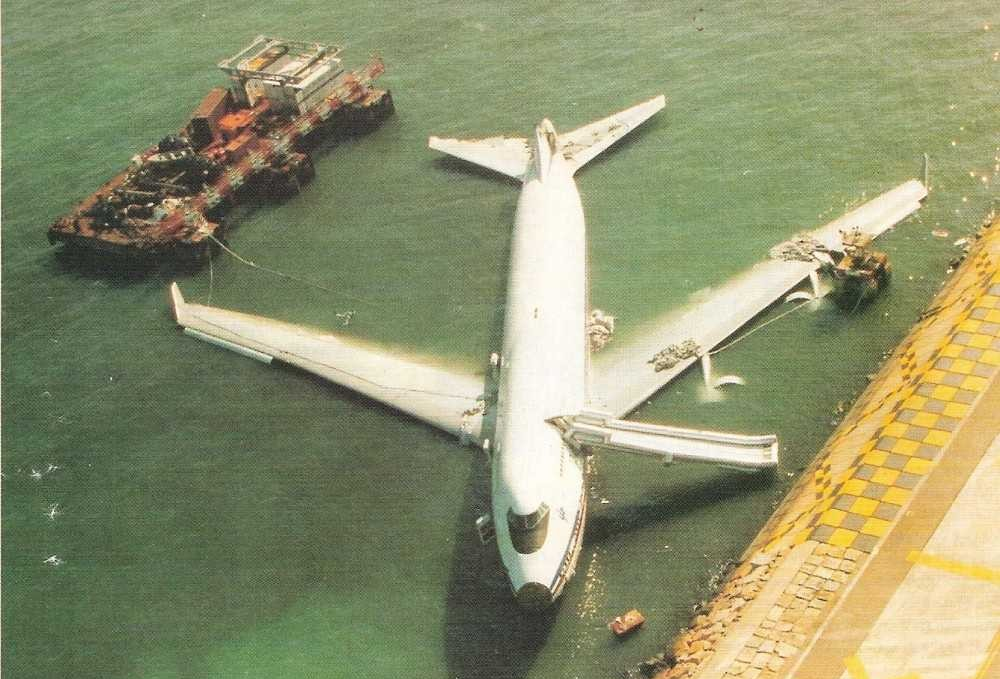
  China Airlines Flight 605
- 4 November 1993 – China Airlines Flight 605, a Boeing 747-400 overran the runway at Kai Tak International Airport. The pilot failed to initiate a mandatory missed approach procedure after observing severe airspeed fluctuations. Nobody on board was seriously injured in the incident.
- 22 August 1999 – China Airlines Flight 642, an MD-11, crashed while attempting to land at Hong Kong International Airport during a typhoon. The aircraft flipped and caught fire, killing three on board. There were 312 survivors.
- 13 April 2010 – Cathay Pacific Flight 780, an Airbus A330-342, makes an emergency landing after suffering dual engine faults. The pilots were unable to decrease thrust to the number 1 engine, and the aircraft landed at twice the normal landing speed. Fuel contamination at Surabaya Airport was found to have damaged the engines. 63 people were injured in the evacuation.
- 20 October 2025 – Emirates SkyCargo Flight 9788, a Boeing 747-400 operated by Air ACT, suffered a runway excursion at Hong Kong International Airport, striking a ground vehicle and plunging into the sea. The 4 crew were unharmed, but the two occupants of the ground vehicle were killed.

=== India ===
- 12 July 1949 – A KLM Lockheed Constellation crashed near Ghatkobar while attempting to land in bad weather. All ten crewmembers and 35 passengers died, including the prominent U.S. journalist H.R. Knickerbocker. The accident was attributed to pilot error.
- 2 May 1953 – BOAC Flight 783, a de Havilland Comet, broke up mid-air and crashed after encountering a severe squall, shortly after taking off from Calcutta (now Kolkata), India. All 43 on board were killed.
- 25 May 1958 – a Dan-Air Avro York crashed near Gurgaon following an in-flight fire caused by engine failure, killing four of five on board.
- 7 July 1962 – Alitalia Flight 771, a Douglas DC-8, crashed into a hill northeast of Mumbai while on approach. The accident was attributed to navigation error. All 94 aboard were killed.
- 28 July 1963 – United Arab Airlines Flight 869 crashed off Bombay Airport, killing all 63 on board. The cause was probably a loss of control in turbulence and bad weather.
- 30 January 1971 – an Indian Airlines Fokker F27 was hijacked en route from Srinagar to Jammu. The aircraft was flown to Lahore in Pakistan where the passengers and crew were released and the plane subsequently destroyed.
- 14 June 1972 – Japan Air Lines Flight 471, a DC-8, crashed near Palam Airport, killing 82 of 87 onboard and three on the ground; Japan claimed that a false glide path signal caused the crash, while India claimed that the pilot disregarded let-down procedures.
- 24 September 1972 – Japan Air Lines Flight 472, a DC-8, overran the runway at Juhu Aerodrome after landing at the wrong airport; all 122 onboard survived.
- 31 May 1973 – Indian Airlines Flight 440, a Boeing 737-200, crashed on approach to Palam Airport due to pilot error. 48 of 65 onboard died.
- 12 October 1976 – Indian Airlines Flight 171, a Sud Aviation Caravelle, crashed in Bombay following an in-flight fire caused by an uncontained engine failure, killing all 95 on board.
- 1 January 1978 – Air India Flight 855, a Boeing 747-200, crashed off the coast of Bandra, Bombay, (now Mumbai) when the captain became spatially disoriented after the failure of one of the flight instruments in the cockpit. All 213 aboard were killed.
- 17 December 1978 – Indian Airlines Flight 403, a Boeing 737-200, overran the runway at Begumpet Airport, Hyderabad. 1 person on board and 3 on the ground were killed.
- 20 December 1978 – Indian Airlines Flight 410 was hijacked shortly before landing at Palam Airport by Bholanath Pandey and Devendranath Pandey. They demanded the immediate release of Indian National Congress party leader Indira Gandhi. They surrendered soon after some passengers managed to escape.
- 29 September 1981 – Indian Airlines Flight 423, a Boeing 737, was hijacked by Sikh extremists and forced to land in Lahore, Pakistan, where special forces stormed the aircraft; there were no fatalities.
- 21 June 1982 – Air India Flight 403, a Boeing 707, crashed at Sahar International Airport in Bombay in heavy weather. Two crew members and 15 passengers died; 94 survived.
- 5 July 1984 – Indian Airlines Flight 405, an Airbus A300, was hijacked on a domestic flight from Srinagar to Delhi with 254 passengers and 10 crew on board, and flown to Lahore Airport in Pakistan. The demands (release of prisoners and money) of the hijackers were not met and they ultimately surrendered to Pakistani authorities on 6 July.
- 14 August 1984 – Indian Airlines Flight 421, a Boeing 737, was hijacked on a domestic flight between Delhi and Srinagar. It was flown to Lahore, Karachi and finally Dubai, where the defense minister of the UAE negotiated the release of the passengers. It was related to the Sikh secessionist struggle in the Indian state of Punjab.
- 19 October 1988 – Indian Airlines Flight 113, a Boeing 737-200, crashed on final approach to Ahmedabad airport due to pilot error. 133 of the 135 people on board were killed.

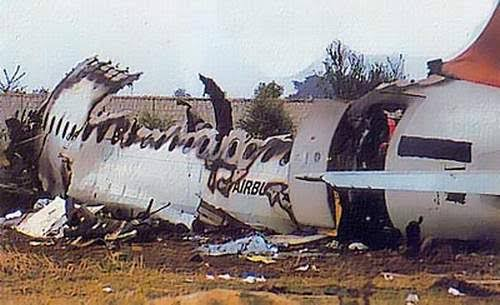
Indian Airlines Flight 605 wreckage

- 14 February 1990 – Indian Airlines Flight 605, an Airbus A320, crashed on final approach to Hindustan Airport, Bangalore, killing 92 of the 146 people on board. The cause was pilot error.
- 16 August 1991 – Indian Airlines Flight 257, a Boeing 737-200, crashed into Thangjing Hill on descent into Imphal due to pilot error, killing all 69 occupants.
- 24-25 April 1993 – Indian Airlines Flight 427, a Boeing 737, was hijacked by a terrorist who demanded passage to Afghanistan, but was denied overflight permission by Pakistani authorities and the pilot diverted to Amritsar. The hijacker was killed after security forces stormed the aircraft.
- 26 April 1993 – Indian Airlines Flight 491, a Boeing 737-200, crashed after striking a truck and power line at the end of the runway while taking off from Aurangabad, Maharashtra. 55 people were killed.
- 12 November 1996 – the **Charkhi Dadri mid-air collision** occurred when Saudia Flight 763, a Boeing 747-100, collided in mid-air with Kazakhstan Airlines Flight 1907, an Ilyushin Il-76, over the village of Charkhi Dadri. The cause was determined to be pilot error by the Kazakhstan Airlines pilot. All 349 people on board both planes were killed, making it the deadliest mid-air collision in history.
- 30 July 1998 – Indian Airlines Flight 503, a HAL-built Dornier 228, stalled and crashed near Kochi due to mechanical failure. All 6 on board and 3 on the ground were killed.
- 24-31 December 1999 – Indian Airlines Flight 814, an Airbus A300, was hijacked en-route to Delhi by terrorists and flown to Kandahar, Afghanistan. One passenger was killed by the hijackers; the other 192 aboard survived.
- 17 July 2000 – Alliance Air Flight 7412, a Boeing 737-2A8 crashed in a residential estate of Patna after the pilot lost control of the aircraft and stalled. Deaths included 55 people aboard, along with 5 on the ground.
- 22 May 2010 – Air India Express Flight 812, a Boeing 737-800, overran the runway on landing at Mangalore International Airport, killing 158 people.
- 7 August 2020 – Air India Express Flight 1344, a Boeing 737-800, overshot the runway on landing at Calicut International Airport, killing 21 people.

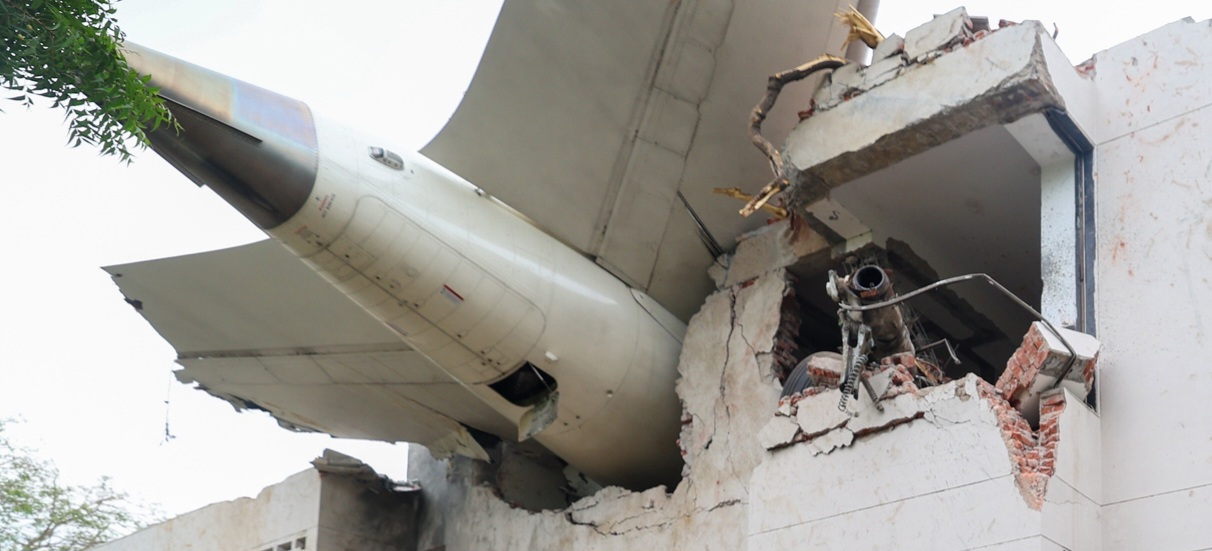
Tail section of Air India Flight 171

- 12 June 2025 – Air India Flight 171, a Boeing 787-8 Dreamliner en route to Gatwick, London carrying 230 passengers and 12 crew members, crashed into a building in a suburb of Ahmedabad less than a minute after takeoff from Ahmedabad Airport. The crash killed 241 people on board and 19 on the ground; with a passenger on board as the only survivor. The exact cause is expected to be determined following an investigation.

=== Indonesia ===
- 11 April 1955 – Kashmir Princess, a Lockheed L-749A Constellation operated by Air India is bombed and crashes into the sea killing 16.
- 16 July 1957 – KLM Flight 844, a Lockheed 1049E Super Constellation operated by KLM crashes into the sea after takeoff killing 58.
- 24 January 1961 – Garuda Indonesian Airways Flight 424, a Douglas C-47, crashes into Mount Burangrang, killing all 21 on board.
- 3 February 1961 – Garuda Indonesian Airways Flight 542, a DC-3 with 26 people on board, went missing over the Java Sea. It was never found.
- 16 February 1967 – Garuda Indonesia Flight 708, a Lockheed L-188 Electra operated by Garuda Indonesia crashes short of the runway, killing 22.
- 10 November 1971 – A Merpati Nusantara Airlines Vickers Viscount 828 crashes into the sea killing all 69 on board.
- 22 April 1974 – Pan Am Flight 812, a Boeing 707, crashed into a mountain in Buleleng, killing all 107 on board.
- 24 September 1975 – Garuda Indonesia Flight 150, a Fokker F-28 Fellowship operated by Garuda Indonesia Airways crashes into trees on approach killing 26.
- 11 July 1979 – A Garuda Indonesia Fokker F28 Mk-1000 crashes into Mount Sibayak killing all 61 on board.
- 28 March 1981 – Garuda Indonesia Flight 206, a McDonnell Douglas DC-9 operated by Garuda Indonesia is hijacked killing 5.
- 20 March 1982 – A Garuda Indonesia Fokker F28 Mk-1000 overruns the runway on landing killing all 27 on board.
- 24 June 1982 – British Airways Flight 9, a Boeing 747-236B operated by British Airways flies into a volcanic cloud causing all four engines to fail. Pilots successfully restart the engines and land the aircraft. Everyone survives.
- 4 April 1987 – Garuda Indonesia Flight 035, a Douglas DC-9-32 operated by Garuda Indonesia crashes on approach killing 23.
- 24 July 1992 – Mandala Airlines Flight 660, a Vickers Viscount, crashed into Mount Liliboy on Ambon Island, killing all 70 on board.
- 18 October 1992 – Merpati Nusantara Airlines Flight 5601, a CASA CN-235, crashed into Mount Papandayan, killing all 31 on board.
- 1 July 1993 – Merpati Nusantara Airlines Flight 724, a Fokker F28, crashed on approach to Jefman Airport, killing 41.
- 7 December 1996 – Dirgantara Air Service Flight 5940, CASA C-212 Aviocar operated by Dirgantara Air Service crashes due to engine failure killing 18.
- 19 April 1997 – Merpati Nusantara Airlines Flight 106, a BAe ATP, lost control and crashed on approach to Buluh Tumbang Airport, killing 15 people.
- 17 July 1997 – Sempati Air Flight 304, a Fokker F27, crashed following an engine failure on takeoff from Bandung Airport, killing 28.
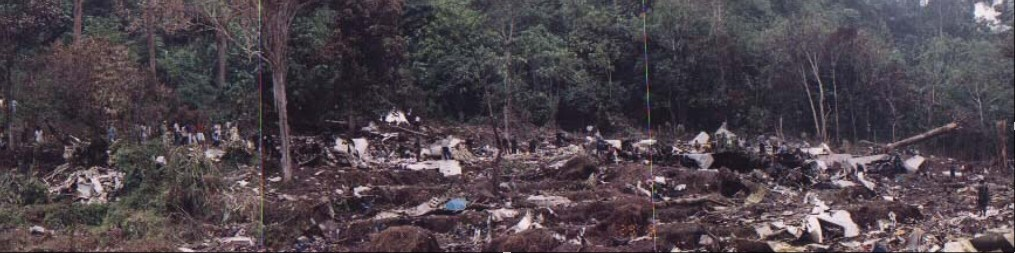
  Garuda Indonesia Flight 152
- 26 September 1997 – **Garuda Indonesia Flight 152**, an Airbus A300B4-220 operated by Garuda Indonesia crashes high terrain on approach killing all 234 people on board.
- 19 December 1997 – SilkAir Flight 185, a Boeing 737-300, nosedived into the Musi River, killing all 104 on board. The American NTSB ruled that the captain had deliberately crashed the plane, but the Indonesian NTSC stated a cause could not be determined.
- 18 November 2000 – Dirgantara Air Service Flight 3130, a Britten Norman BN-2 Islander operated by Dirgantara Air Service crashes into a forest due to overloading. Everyone survives.
- 14 January 2002 – Lion Air Flight 386, a Boeing 737-200 operated by Lion Air crashes on takeoff due to an inappropriate flap setting. Everyone survives.
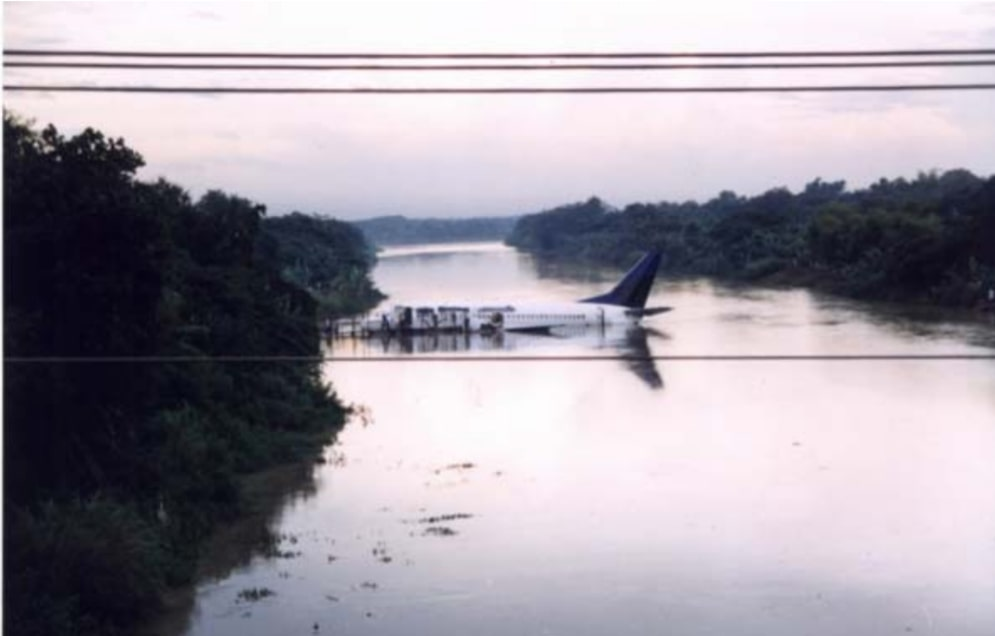
  Garuda Indonesia Flight 421
- 16 January 2002 – Garuda Indonesia Flight 421, a Boeing 737-3Q8 operated by Garuda Indonesia ditches into Bengawan Solo River due to dual engine failure killing 1.
- 30 November 2004 – Lion Air Flight 583, McDonnell Douglas MD-82 operated by Lion Air overruns the runway on landing due to pilot error, killing 25.
- 5 September 2005 – Mandala Airlines Flight 091, a Boeing 737-230 Adv crashes shortly after takeoff due to an improper flap and slat setting, killing 149.
- 4 March 2006 – Lion Air Flight 8987, a McDonnell Douglas MD-82 operated by Lion Air veers off the runway on landing due to differential thrust. Everyone survives.
- 24 December 2006 – Lion Air Flight 792, a Boeing 737-400 operated by Lion Air lands hard causing the landing gear to collapse. Everyone survives.
- 1 January 2007 – Adam Air Flight 574, a Boeing 737-4Q8 operated by Adam Air breaks up in mid-air and crashes into the sea due to pilot error, killing all 102 on board.
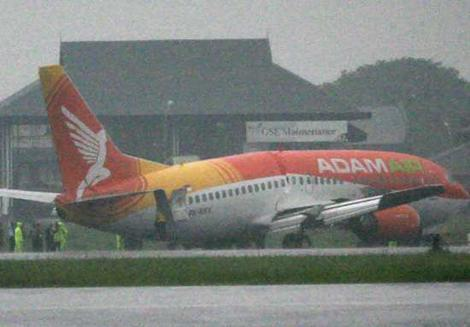
  Adam Air Flight 172
- 21 February 2007 – Adam Air Flight 172, a Boeing 737-33A operated by Adam Air lands hard and suffers structural damage. No one is killed.
- 7 March 2007 – Garuda Indonesia Flight 200, a Boeing 737-497 operated by Garuda Indonesia overruns the runway on landing killing 21.
- 27 August 2008 – Sriwijaya Air Flight 062, a Boeing 737-200, overran the runway at Sultan Thaha Airport in Jambi, following a hydraulic failure. 1 person on the ground was killed.
- 9 April 2009 – An Aviastar British Aerospace 146-300 crashes into Pikei Hill killing all 6.
- 17 April 2009 – Mimika Air Flight 514, a Pilatus PC-6, crashes into a mountain on Papua killing all 11 on board.
- 2 August 2009 – Merpati Nusantara Airlines Flight 9760D, a Twin Otter, went missing en-route above Papua. The aircraft was found 2 days later, with no survivors among the 15 people on board.
- 13 April 2010 – Merpati Nusantara Airlines Flight 836, a Boeing 737-300, overran the runway in bad weather at Rendani Airport. No deaths occurred.
- 10 November 2010 – Lion Air Flight 712, a Boeing 737-400 operated by Lion Air overruns the runway on landing. Everyone survives.
- 7 May 2011 – Merpati Nusantara Airlines Flight 8968, a Xi'an MA60, crashed during a go-around off the coast near Utarom Airport, killing all 25 on board.
- 29 September 2011 – Nusantara Buana Air Flight 823, a CASA C-212, crashes into the jungle near Kutacane, killing all 18 on board.
- 9 May 2012 – A Sukhoi Superjet 100-95 crashes into Mount Salak killing all 45 on board.
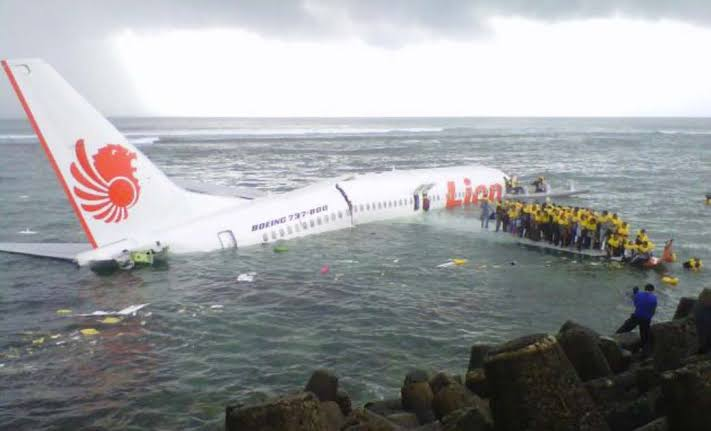
  The wreckage of Lion Air flight 904
- 13 April 2013 – Lion Air Flight 904, a Boeing 737-8GP operated by Lion Air crashes into the sea on approach. Everyone survives.
- 10 June 2013 – Merpati Nusantara Airlines Flight 6517, a Xi'an MA60, bounces three times on landing and crashes at El Tari Airport in Kupang. 25 people are injured.
- 28 December 2014 – Indonesia AirAsia Flight 8501, an Airbus A320-216 operated by Indonesia AirAsia stalls and crashes into the Java Sea killing all 162 on board.
- 16 August 2015 – Trigana Air Flight 267, an ATR 42, crashed into the Bintang Mountains, killing all 54 on board.
- 2 October 2015 – Aviastar Flight 7503, a de Havilland Canada DHC-6 Twin Otter operated by Aviastar crashes into Latimojong Mountain killing all 10 on board.
- 4 April 2016 – Batik Air Flight 7703, a Boeing 737-8GP(WL) operated by Batik Air collides with an ATR 42-600 operated by TransNusa Air Services crossing the runway. Everyone survives.
- 29 October 2018 – Lion Air Flight 610, a Boeing 737 MAX 8 operated by Lion Air crashes into the Java Sea shortly after takeoff due to MCAS flaw, killing all 189 on board.
- 9 January 2021 – Sriwijaya Air Flight 182, a Boeing 737-524 operated by Sriwijaya Air nosedives into the Java Sea minutes after takeoff. All 62 on board were killed. This accident was caused by autothrottle failure followed by pilot error.
- 17 January 2026 – an Indonesia Air Transport ATR 42 operating for the PSDKP crashed into a mountain on approach to Makassar. All 10 occupants were killed.

=== Iran ===
- 6 September 1929 – Imperial Airways de Havilland DH.66 Hercules G-EBMZ stalls when it flares too early while attempting a night landing at Jask Airport in Jask, Persia. It crashes and bursts into flames when its wing fuel tanks ruptured and emergency flares in its wingtips ignite the fuel. Both crew members and one of the three passengers died.
- 16 July 1935 – a KLM Douglas DC-2 crashed on takeoff following an emergency landing at Bushehr. No one was killed.
- 4 December 1946 – Aeroflot Lisunov Li-2 crashed at Mashhad, Iran, killing 24.
- 14 September 1950 – An Iran Air Douglas C-47 Skytrain (registration EP-AAG) crashed on takeoff from Mehrabad Airport, killing all eight on board.
- 1 December 1950 – An Iran Air C-47A (registration EP-AAJ) struck a mountain near Chamaran en route to Tehran from Tabriz, killing all eight on board.
- 22 December 1951 – An Egypt Air SNCASE Languedoc circled Tehran twice in a snowstorm and crashed 10 km W of Tehran, killing 22 on board.
- 25 December 1952 – Iran Air Douglas DC-3; Tehran, Iran: 27 deaths and two survivors.
- 10 September 1958 - Netherlands Naval Aviation Service Martin PBM-5A Mariner crashed during a technical stop at Abadan Airport, killing all 10 crew members. Their bodies ere interred in the local Christian cemetery until 2002 when they were returned to the Netherlands during an official ceremony.
- 15 March 1963 – A TMA Cargo Avro York crashed seven miles southeast of Karaj, killing all 4 on board.
- 15 March 1974 – A Sud Aviation Caravelle of Sterling Airlines damaged beyond repair while taxiing in Mehrabad International Airport, causing 15 casualties.
- 21 January 1980 – Iran Air Flight 291; near Tehran, Iran. The aircraft hit high ground in a snowstorm during the approach to land. All 8 crew members and 120 passengers were killed.
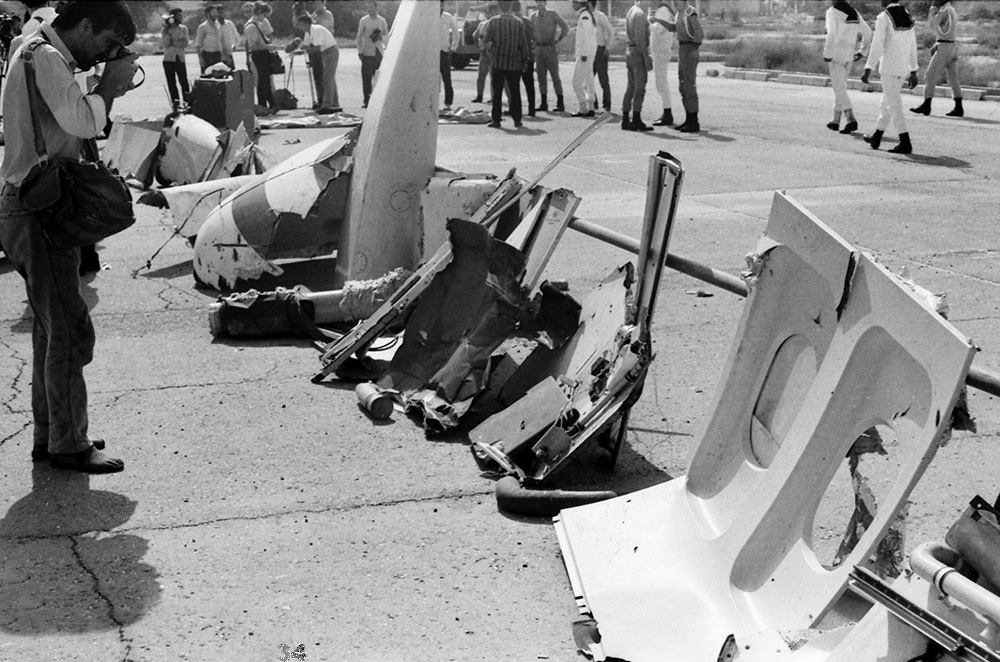
  Pieces of the wreckage of Iran Air Flight 655
- 3 July 1988 – **Iran Air Flight 655**, an Airbus A300, is shot down over the Strait of Hormuz by a missile fired from US navy warship USS Vincennes. All 290 passengers and crew on board were killed.
- 24 May 1991 – A forced landing near Kermanshah, Iran, due to fuel shortage had to be made after three missed approaches by Soviet Metro Cargo Ilyushin Il-76. 4 on-board casualties.
- 8 February 1993 – Iran Air Tours Flight 962 a Tupolev Tu-154 was departing on a non-scheduled flight from Mehrabad International Airport, Tehran, to Mashhad International Airport when it became involved in a mid-air collision with an Iranian Air Force Sukhoi Su-24 fighter plane that was on approach to the same airport. All 12 crew members and 119 passengers on board, plus both pilots of the Su-24, were killed, totaling 133 deaths.
- 15 November 1993 – Aviastar Airlines Flight 051, an Antonov An-124, crashed east of Kerman killing all 17 on board.
- 12 October 1994 – Iran Aseman Airlines Flight 746, a Fokker F28 Fellowship (registered EP-PAV) en route from Isfahan to Tehran suffered a sudden loss of power in both engines at 23:05 local time, 35 minutes after take-off from Isfahan International Airport. The aircraft went into an uncontrolled descent and crashed near Natanz, killing all 59 passengers and 7 crew members on board.
- 17 May 2001 – A Faraz Qeshm Airlines Yakovlev Yak-40 departed from Tehran on a flight to Gorgan Airport carrying 30 people; including the Iranian Transport Minister Rahman Dadman, two deputy ministers and seven more members of parliament. It was forced to divert due to bad weather conditions and was later discovered crashed in the Alborz Mountains, near Sari, Iran. All on board perished.
- 12 February 2002 – Iran Air Tours Flight 956, a Tupolev Tu-154, crashed into the Sefid Kooh mountains during heavy rain, snow, and dense fog while descending for Khorramabad Airport. All twelve crew members and 107 passengers were killed.
- 23 December 2002 – Aeromist-Kharkiv Flight 2137, (registration UR-14003), an Antonov An-140 crashed near Ardestan, Iran, killing all 44 on board.
- 20 April 2005 – Saha Airlines Flight 171, a Boeing 707-320C, registration EP-SHE, flying from Kish Island, crashed on landing at Mehrabad Airport, Tehran following an unstabilized approach with a higher than recommended airspeed. Gear and/or a tire failed after touchdown and the flight overran the far end of the runway. Of the 12 crew and 157 passengers, 3 passengers were killed.
- 1 September 2006 – Iran Air Tours Flight 945, A Tupolev Tu-154 from Bandar Abbas Airport with 11 crew and 137 passengers on board burst into flames upon landing at Mashhad International Airport, Iran killing 28 of those on board.
- 15 July 2009 – Caspian Airlines Flight 7908, a Tupolev Tu-154M, was traveling from Tehran to Yerevan when one of its engines suffered a catastrophic failure. The engine's explosive disintegration severed the hydraulic lines and the fuel lines. The hot hydraulic fluid contacted oxygen and fuel, resulting in a fire that ultimately caused the aircraft to lose its control. The aircraft crashed, killing all 168 people (156 passengers, 12 crew) on board.
- 24 July 2009 – Aria Air Flight 1525, an Ilyushin IL-62M, (registration UP-I6208), crashed on landing at Mashhad International Airport, killing 16 out of 173 on board.
- 24 January 2010 – Taban Air Flight 6437, a Tupolev Tu-154, crashed whilst making an emergency landing at Mashhad International Airport due to a medical emergency; all 157 and 13 crew survived the accident with 42 receiving minor injuries.
- 9 January 2011 – Iran Air Flight 277, a Boeing 727, (registration EP-IRP), on a scheduled domestic service from Tehran to Urmia, Iran, crashed after aborting its approach into Urmia Airport in poor weather. Of 105 aboard, 77 were killed.
- 18 October 2011 – Iran Air Flight 742; a Boeing 727, (registration EP-IRR), on a scheduled service from Moscow, Russia, to Tehran, made an emergency landing at Tehran's Mehrabad International Airport after the nose landing gear failed to deploy. All 113 on board escaped injury.
- 10 August 2014 – Sepahan Airlines Flight 5915 an IrAn-140-100 (registration EP-GPA), was taking off when one of its engines malfunctioned. The aircraft lost its altitude, skidded, crashed into a wall, and burst into flames. The wreckage then stopped on a highway. 40 people were killed.

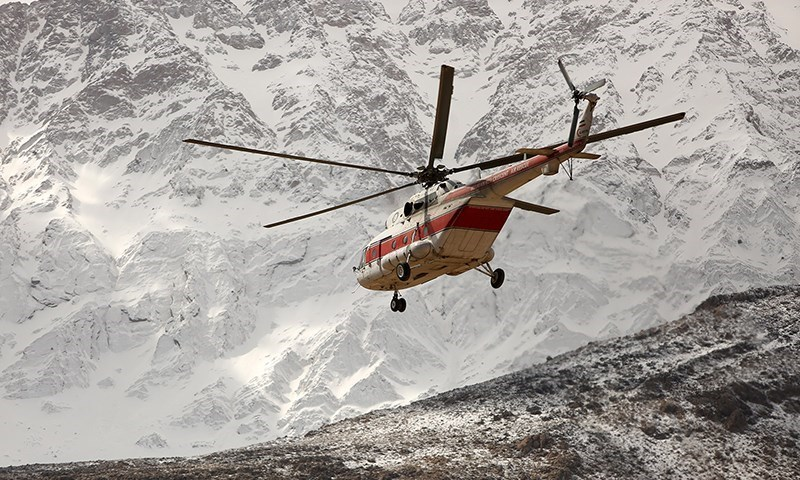
Search and rescue team were deployed to search for the wreckage of Iran Aseman Airlines Flight 3704

- 18 February 2018 – Iran Aseman Airlines Flight 3704 an ATR 72-212, (registration EP-ATS), during its approach to Yasuj Airport, crashed into Mount Dena in the Zagros Mountains, killing all 60 passengers and 6 crew members on board.
- 11 March 2018 - Bombardier Challenger 604 private jet, owned by Turkish group Başaran Holding, flying from Istanbul to Sharjah crashed in the Zagros Mountains near Shahr-e Kord, killing all 11 on board.
- 14 January 2019 – a Saha Airlines Boeing 707, (registration EP-CPP), crashed at Fath Air Base, near Karaj, killing all 16 people on board. This aircraft was also the last civil Boeing 707 in operation.
- 8 January 2020 – Ukraine International Airlines Flight 752, a Boeing 737-8KV operated by Ukraine International Airlines is shot down by a missile shortly after takeoff killing all 176 people on board.
- 27 January 2020 – Caspian Airlines Flight 6936 overruns the runway while landing at Mahshahr Airport. Everybody survives.

=== Iraq ===
- 20 December 1934 – a KLM Douglas DC-2 crashes south of Ar-Rutbah in bad weather, killing all 7 on board.
- 22 November 2003 – A DHL Airbus A300 suffers a missile strike, causing loss of hydraulic pressure. The plane lands safely at Baghdad International Airport.
- 9 January 2007 – An AerianTur-M Antonov An-26 **crashes** on approach to Balad Air Base. 34 people are killed.

=== Israel ===
- 8 May 1972 – **Sabena Flight 571**, a Boeing 707, was hijacked and flown to Lod Airport (its destination). The aircraft was stormed by commandos, in which 1 passenger and 2 hijackers were killed.
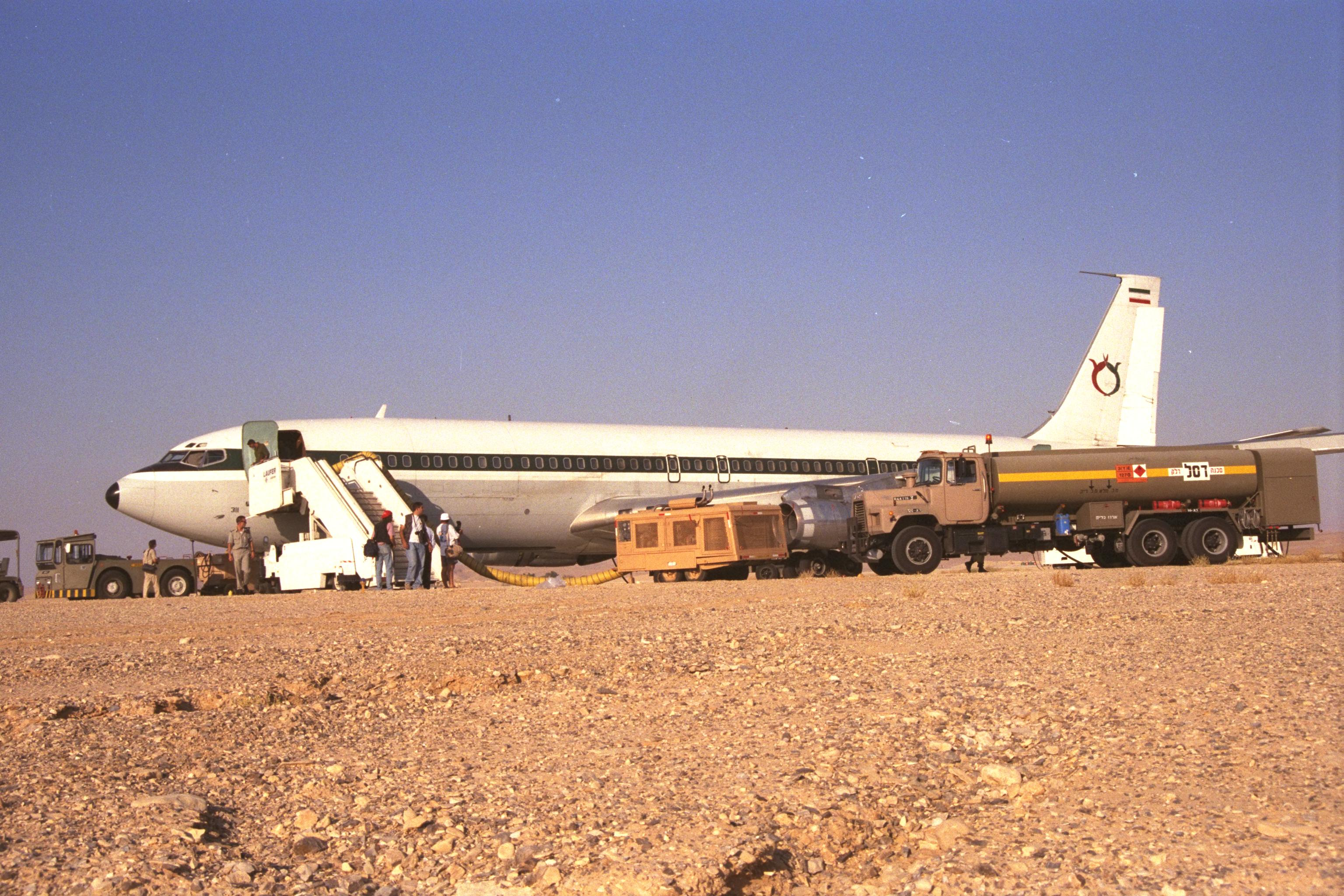
  Kish Air Flight 707 after landing
- 19 September 1995 – Kish Air Flight 707, a Boeing 707, was hijacked by a disgruntled flight attendant and flown to Ovda Airbase. No one was harmed.

=== Japan ===
- 9 April 1952 – Japan Air Lines Flight 301, a Martin 2-0-2, crashed into Mount Mihara, killing all 37 on board.
- 4 February 1966 – All Nippon Airways Flight 60, a Boeing 727, crashed into Tokyo Bay while on approach to Tokyo International Airport, killing 133 people in the deadliest single-plane incident until 1971. The cause of is undetermined.
- 4 March 1966 – Canadian Pacific Airlines Flight 402, a DC-8, descended below the glide slope on landing at Tokyo International Airport in fog. The plane hit approach lights and a seawall. Of the 62 passengers and 10 crew, 8 passengers survived.
- 5 March 1966 – BOAC Flight 911, a Boeing 707, was flying above Mount Fuji when it encountered a clear-air turbulence. The aircraft spiraled down with parts of the aircraft detaching one by one. It crashed into the ground, killing all 124 on board. A photo of the aircraft falling was captured by a photographer.
- 26 August 1966 – a Japan Air Lines Convair 880 crashed on a training flight on takeoff from Haneda Airport for undetermined reasons, killing all 6 crew on board.
- 13 November 1966 – All Nippon Airways Flight 533, a NAMC YS-11, crashed into the sea off Matsuyama Airport, killing all 50 on board.
- 3 July 1971 – Toa Domestic Airlines Flight 63, a NAMC YS-11A-217, crashed into the face of Yokotsu Mountain; all 68 people on board were killed.
- 30 July 1971 – All Nippon Airways Flight 58, a Boeing 727, collided with a JASDF Mitsubishi F-86 Sabre near Shizukuishi, Iwate, killing 162 people in the deadliest aviation disaster in the world until 1972.
- 9 February 1982 – Japan Air Lines Flight 350, a DC-8, was on approach to Haneda Airport when the pilot deliberately nose-dived the plane to crash it. The pilot was then subdued by other flight crews, yet the plane remained descending. It then crashed into Tokyo Bay. The pilot who deliberately nose-dived the plane was suffering from mental illness before the incident. 24 people were killed.
- 26 August 1982 – Southwest Air Lines Flight 611, a Boeing 737-200, overran the runway at Ishigaki Airport due to pilot error and hydroplaning. 67 people were injured.

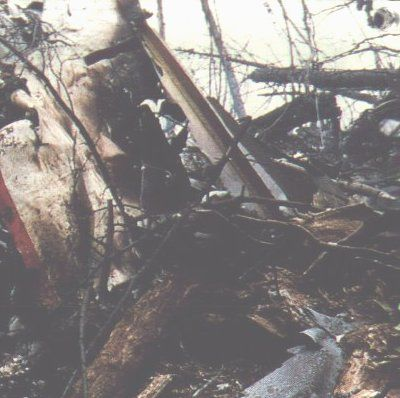
Wreckage of Japan Airlines Flight 123, the worst single aircraft crash in history

- 12 August 1985 – **Japan Air Lines Flight 123**, a Boeing 747SR, was flying over Japan when the rear pressure bulkhead failed, causing hydraulic loss, damage to control systems and the detachment of the vertical stabilizer. which led to losing control. Flight crews tried to recover the plane and head back to Tokyo, but the Boeing 747 crashed into Mount Takamagahara, Japan. Only 4 people survived. It is the deadliest single-aircraft crash to date and the deadliest in Japan. Investigators concluded that the rear pressure bulkhead was improperly repaired after being damaged in a tailstrike a few years earlier, resulting in the detachment.
- 26 October 1986 – Thai Airways International Flight 620, an Airbus A300, suffered an explosion mid-flight after a hand grenade was inadvertently activated. The aircraft landed safely at Osaka Airport with no deaths.
- 18 April 1993 – Japan Air System Flight 451, a DC-9, experienced wind shear and crashed on landing at Hanamaki Airport. 19 people were injured.
- 26 April 1994 – China Airlines Flight 140, an Airbus A300, stalled on a go-around and impacted the runway at Naga Airport. Only seven people survived. The first officer accidentally pushed the TO/GA button which raises the throttle position to the same as take offs and go-arounds. The pilots tried to correct the situation, but their action caused the autopilot to raise the nose sharply, causing it to stall.
- 21 June 1995 – All Nippon Airways Flight 857, a Boeing 747, was hijacked en route to Hokkaido. A standoff occurred overnight after landing at Hakodate Airport, ending in the aircraft being stormed and the hijacker arrested. 2 people, including the hijacker, were injured.
- 13 June 1996 – Garuda Indonesia Flight 865, a DC-10, was taking off from Fukuoka when it suffered an engine failure. The pilots then rejected take-off, and the plane overshot the runway, skidded, and burst into flames. The accident claimed 3 lives.
- 23 July 1999 – All Nippon Airways Flight 61, a Boeing 747-400 is hijacked and taken back over Tokyo, Japan. The captain was killed.
- 31 January 2001 – The 2001 Japan Airlines mid-air incident occurred when Japan Airlines Flight 907, a Boeing 747, and Japan Airlines Flight 958, a DC10, nearly collided over Shizuoka. The 747 had to take evasive action to avoid a collision, causing injuries to 100 people on board. Air traffic control errors were attributed to the mishap. Both flights landed safely.

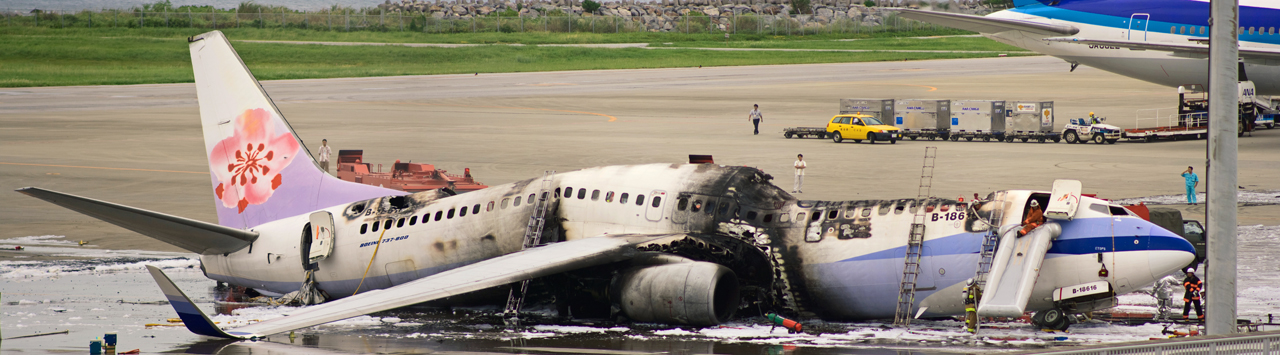
China Airlines Flight 120 caught fire while taxiing

- 20 August 2007 – China Airlines Flight 120, a Boeing 737-800 suffered an engine fire after parking at Naha Airport, Okinawa. The fire spread to the fuselage and destroyed the aircraft. A bolt that had come loose from the slat track managed to puncture the fuel tank, causing a fire after normal landing. All on board were evacuated.
- 23 March 2009 – FedEx Express Flight 80, a MD-11F, bounced and crashed on landing at Narita Airport, killing both pilots.
- 2 January 2024 – The 2024 Haneda Airport runway collision occurred when Japan Airlines Flight 516, an A350-900, collided with a Japan Coast Guard De Havilland Canada Dash 8 while landing. The aircraft caught fire and was damaged beyond repair. All 379 passengers and crew were evacuated from the aircraft. Five of the six crew members aboard the Coast Guard aircraft were killed. The Japan Coast Guard aircraft it collided with was participating in relief efforts following the 2024 Noto earthquake the previous day.

=== Jordan ===
Aircraft destroyed at Dawson's Field

- September 1970 – 5 aircraft were hijacked as part of the Dawson's Field hijackings. Three of them, TWA flight 741, Swissair flight 100, and BOAC flight 775, were flown to Dawson's Field in Zarqa.
- 30 June 1973 – **Aeroflot Flight 512**, a Tupolev Tu-134, overran the runway during an aborted takeoff from Amman Civil Airport. The aircraft struck trees and houses, killing 2 crew members and 7 people on the ground.

=== Kazakhstan ===
- 26 December 1941 – an Aeroflot Tupolev G-2 crashed near Bayserke, killing 26 of the 34 people on board.
- 4 January 1965 – Aeroflot Flight 101/X-20, an Il-18D, crashed on approach to Alma-Ata airport, killing 64 of the 103 people on board.
- 11 May 1973 – Aeroflot Flight 6551, an Il-18B, lost control and crashed near Semipalantinsk, killing all 63 on board. The cause was not determined.
- 13 January 1977 – Aeroflot Flight 3843, a Tu-134, lost control and crashed following an engine fire near Alma-Ata. All 90 on board were killed.
- 8 July 1980 – **Aeroflot Flight 4225**, a Tupolev Tu-154B-2, encountered a microburst shortly after takeoff. The plane stalled, nose-dived, slid, and exploded near Alma-Ata. All 166 people were killed in Kazakhstan's deadliest plane crash.
- 30 August 1983 – Aeroflot Flight 5463, a Tu-134, crashed into the western slope of Dolan Mountain while on approach to Almaty. All 90 passengers and crews on board were killed.

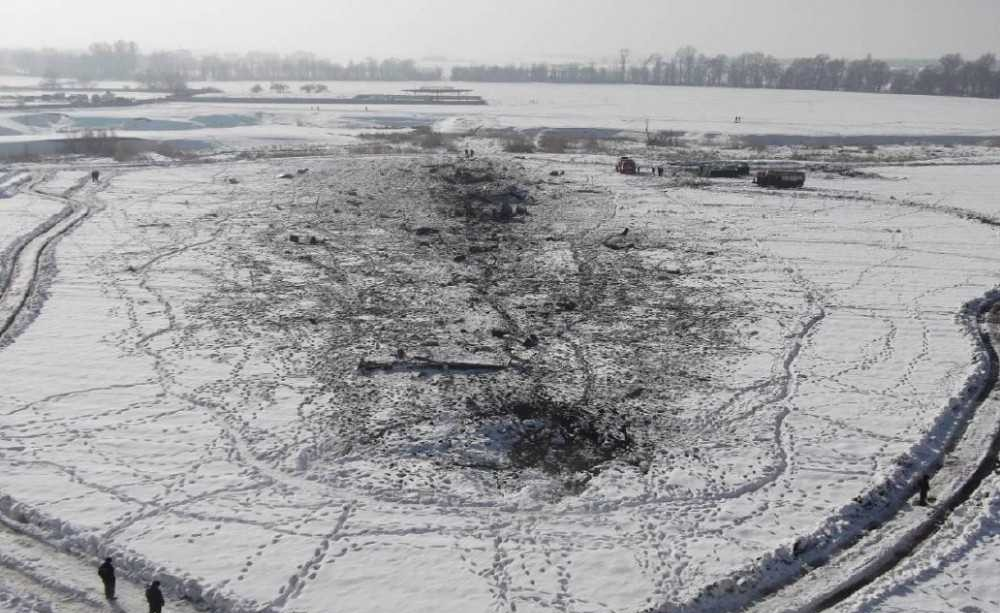
Crash site of SCAT Airlines Flight 760

- 29 January 2013 – SCAT Airlines Flight 760, a Bombardier CRJ200, suddenly nose-dived and impacted terrain while on final approach to Almaty International Airport. All 21 people aboard killed. Investigators concluded that an elevator deflection caused the crash, but they could not determine the cause of the deflection.
- 20 January 2015 – Olimp Air Flight 4653, an Antonov An-2, crashed in the Shu District, killing 6 of the 7 on board.
- 27 December 2019 – Bek Air Flight 2100, a Fokker 100, crashed on takeoff at Almaty International Airport, killing 13. Ice build up on the wings affected the aircraft's ability to gain lift.
- 25 December 2024 – Azerbaijan Airlines Flight 8243, an Embraer E190AR, crashed during an emergency landing at Aktau International Airport after reportedly declaring an emergency while flying over the Caspian Sea, killing 38 of the 67 occupants aboard. Preliminary reports indicate the accident might’ve been caused by a bird strike, with survivors reported an explosion and shrapnel striking the aircraft.

=== Kuwait ===
- 2 August 1990 – **British Airways Flight 149**, a Boeing 747, landed at Kuwait International Airport some hours after the Iraqi Invasion of Kuwait had begun. The Iraqi army captured the aircraft's occupants and destroyed it. Passengers were held for up to 4 months, witnessed abuse towards Kuwaiti citizens and faced abuse themselves, and one Kuwaiti national was reported to have been killed by Iraqi troops.

=== Kyrgyzstan ===
- 24 August 2008 – **Iran Aseman Airlines Flight 6895**, a Boeing 737-200Adv operated by Itek Air, was on final approach to Dushanbe on 24 August 2008 when it crashed into terrain. 65 people were killed.. Russian investigators concluded that the pilots maintained the aircraft altitude below the glideslope.
- 28 December 2011 – Kyrgyzstan Air Company Flight 3, a Tu-134, flipped over after a hard landing at Osh Airport. No deaths occurred.
- 22 November 2015 – Avia Traffic Company Flight 768, a Boeing 737-300, touched the ground too hard, overran the runway and slid, detaching the engines and causing some significant damages to the plane. Although the plane suffered great damage, none were killed.
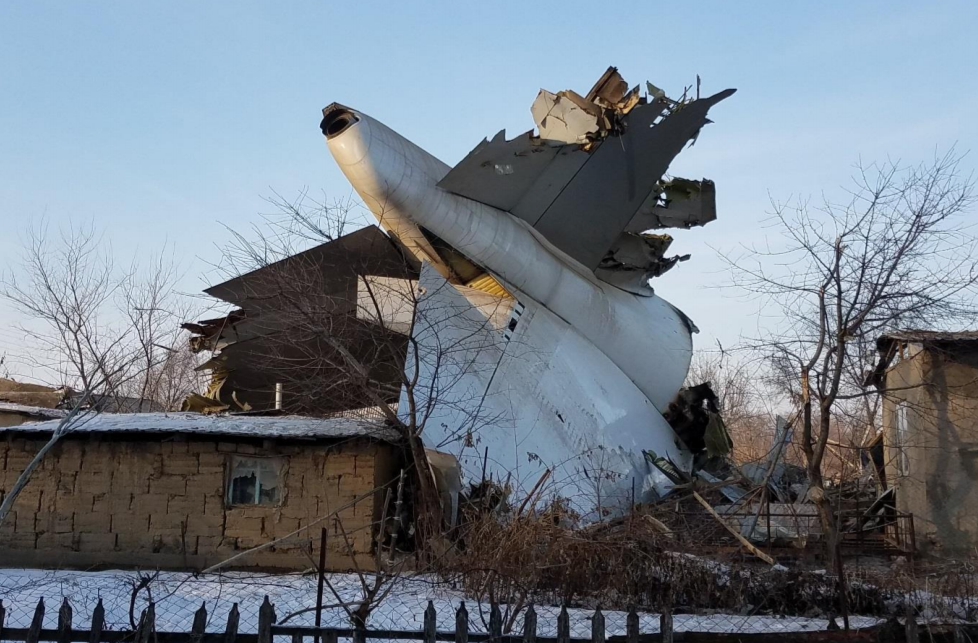
  The tail section of Turkish Airlines Flight 6491
- 16 January 2017 – Turkish Airlines Flight 6491, a Boeing 747-400F operated by ACT Airlines, crashed into a residential area upon attempting landing in thick fog in Bishkek, Kyrgyzstan on 16 January 2017. The 4 crew members and 35 people on the ground were killed.

=== Laos ===
- 19 October 2000 – Lao Aviation Flight 703, a Harbin Y-12, crashed on approach to Nathong Airport, killing 8.
- 16 October 2013 – **Lao Airlines Flight 301**, an ATR 72-600, was about to land. As they approach, the plane crashed to the ground, bounced a few times, skidded, and plunged into the Mekong River killing all 49 people on board the aircraft. Investigators concluded that the cause of the accident was due to pilot error while approaching.

=== Lebanon ===
- 21 November 1959 – Ariana Afghan Airlines Flight 202, a Douglas DC-4, crashed into the side of a hill at Aramoun near Beirut shortly after take-off. 24 of the 27 people on board died.
- 30 December 1975 – Malév Flight 240, a Tupolev Tu-154, crashed into the Mediterranean sea on approach to Beirut Airport, killing all 60 on board. The cause of the crash was never revealed.
- 25 January 2010 – **Ethiopian Airlines Flight 409**, a Boeing 737-800, stalled and entered a spiral dive after taking off from Beirut Airport. The crashed into the Mediterranean Sea off the Lebanese coast, killing all 90 on board.

=== Malaysia ===
- 6 June 1976 – the Double Six Crash occurred when a Sabah Air GAF Nomad stalled and crashed near Kota Kinabalu International Airport. The crash killed all 11 on board, including several state ministers.
- 27 September 1977 – Japan Air Lines Flight 715, a McDonnell Douglas DC-8, descended below MDA of 750 feet, then at 300 feet it crashed into the side of a hill 4 miles from the airport, near Ladang Elmina estate. It broke on impact killing 34 out of 77.
- 4 December 1977 – **Malaysian Airline System Flight 653**, a Boeing 737-200, was hijacked en route from Penang to Kuala Lumpur. It eventually crashed at Tanjung Kupang, killing all 100 on board.
- 18 December 1983 – Malaysian Airline System Flight 684, an Airbus A300, struck trees, slid, and struck a stream embankment, losing its nose and both engines. All aboard survived.
- 15 September 1995 – Malaysia Airlines Flight 2133, a Fokker 50, overran the runway and crashed into a shantytown at Tawau Airport, killing 34 people.
- 6 September 1997 – Royal Brunei Airlines Flight 238, a Dornier 228, crashed into the forest of Lambir Hills National Park near Miri, killing all 10 on board.

=== Myanmar ===
- 21 June 1987, a Burma Airways Fokker F27 Friendship crashed into terrain near Heho, killing all 45 on board.
- 11 October 1987, a Burma Airways Fokker F-27 **crashed into a mountain**, killing all 49 people on board.
- 24 August 1998 – Myanma Airways Flight 635, a Fokker F-27 Friendship, crashed into a mountain while on approach to Tachilek Airport, killing all 36 people on board.
- 25 December 2012 – Air Bagan Flight 11, a Fokker 100, crashed into a paddy field and burst into flames after the pilots thought a road was the runway. Two people were killed, including one on the ground.
- 8 May 2019 – Biman Bangladesh Airlines Flight 060, a Dash 8, suffered a runway excursion at Yangon International Airport. 20 were injured and the aircraft was written off.
- 21 May 2024 – Singapore Airlines Flight 321, a Boeing 777-300ER, encountered severe turbulence above Myanmar. Over 100 people were injured, and one passenger suffered a heart attack and died. The aircraft diverted to Bangkok.

=== Nepal ===
- 31 March 1975 – a Royal Nepal Airlines PC-6 crashed in Kathmandu killing all 4 on board.
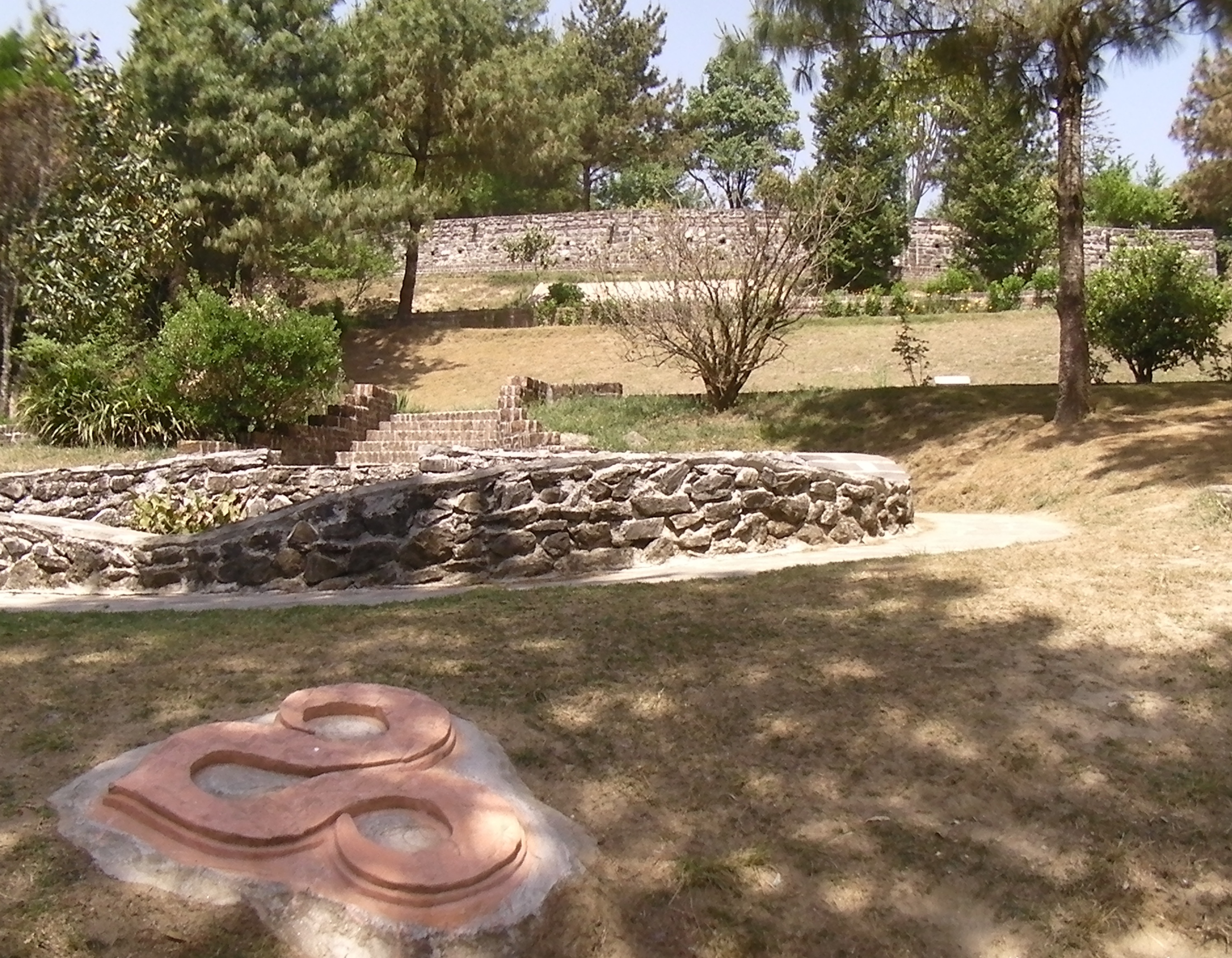
  A memorial park in Kakani for the victims of Thai Airways International Flight 311
- 31 July 1992 – Thai Airways International Flight 311, an Airbus A310, crashed into the Himalayas on approach to Tribhuvan International Airport in Kathmandu. All 113 on board were killed in the second-deadliest plane crash in Nepal.
- 28 September 1992 – **Pakistan International Airlines Flight 268**, an Airbus A300B4-203, crashed into a mountain while on final approach to Kathmandu's Tribhuvan, killing all 167 people on board in the worst aviation accident in Nepal.
- 31 July 1993 – a Dornier 228 of Everest Air crashed into terrain near Bharatpur killing all 19 on board.
- 7 July 1999 – Hinduja Cargo Services Flight 8533, a Boeing 727, impacts the Champadevi hills after takeoff killing all 5 crew.
- 5 September 1999 – Necon Air Flight 128, a BAe 748-501 Super 2B, crashed while approaching Tribhuvan International Airport on a flight from Pokhara to Kathmandu. The aircraft collided with a telecommunications tower, killing all 15 occupants of the plane.
- 26 December 1999, Indian Airlines Flight 814, an Airbus A300, was hijacked en route from Kathmandu to Delhi. The aircraft ended up in Kandahar, Afghanistan. Indian Airlines suspended all flights to and from Nepal for some time, fearing a lack of security at check-in.
- 27 July 2000 – a Royal Nepal Airlines Twin Otter crashed into trees on approach to Dhangadhi Airport, killing all 25 on board.
- 12 November 2001 – a Fishtail Air AS350 helicopter crashed into the Rara Lake. 4 of the 6 on board were killed, including Princess Prekshya Shah.
- 22 August 2002 – a Shangri-La Air Twin Otter crashed on approach to Pokhara International Airport, killing all 18 on board.
- 21 June 2006 – a Yeti Airlines Twin Otter stalled and crashed on a go-around at Jumla Airport, killing all 9 on board.
- 23 September 2006 – a Mil Mi-8 helicopter of Shree Air crashed in Ghunsa, killing all 24 on board. The victims included high-profile conservationists on an expedition with the World Wide Fund for Nature.
- 8 October 2008 – Yeti Airlines Flight 103, a De Havilland Canada DHC-6 Twin Otter carrying 19 people crashed into terrain in bad weather. The Captain was the sole survivor. An investigation concluded that the cause was CFIT.
- 24 August 2010 – Agni Air Flight 101, a Dornier 228-101, crashed into a mountain, killing all 14 aboard. Investigation concluded that the pilots became spatially disoriented after the plane's attitude indicator gave the wrong information following a generator failure.
- 15 December 2010 – a Tara Air DHC-6 crashed into Bilandu forest just five minutes after take-off from Lamidanda Airport. All 22 passengers and crews perished.
- 25 September 2011 – Buddha Air Flight 103, a Beechcraft 1900D, struck terrain while on approach to Tribhuvan International Airport. There were 16 passengers and three crew members on board. One person survived the crash but died en route to the hospital.
- 14 May 2012 – Agni Air Flight CHT, a Dornier 228, crashed into rocky terrain after a failed go-around. 15 out of 21 passengers and crews were killed, including Indian child actress Taruni Sachdev.
- 28 September 2012 – Sita Air Flight 601, a Dornier 228, suffered an engine failure in mid-air. The pilots tried to make their way back to the airport but failed. The plane crashed and burst into flames, killing all 19 people on board.

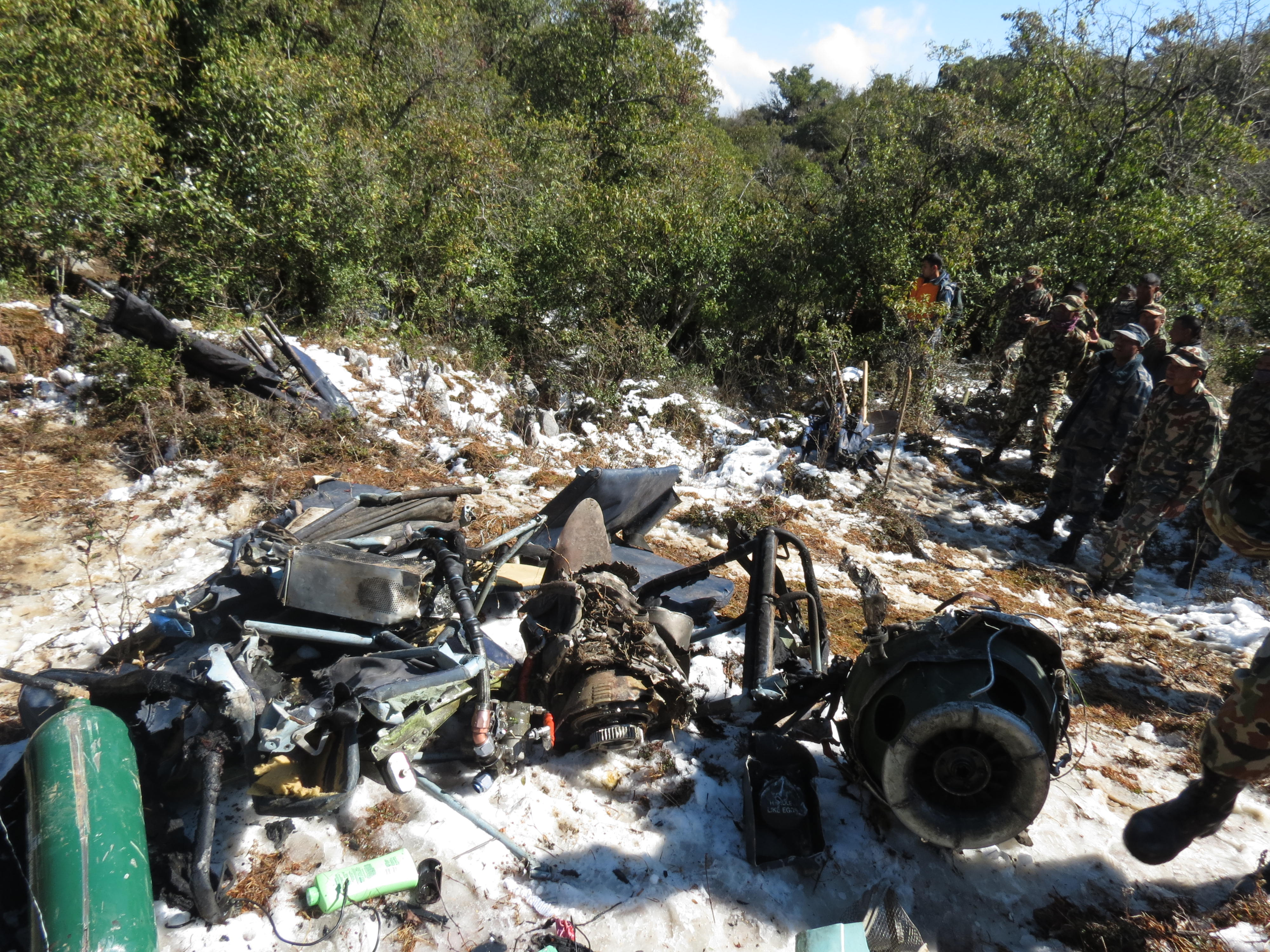
Wreckage of Nepal Airlines Flight 183

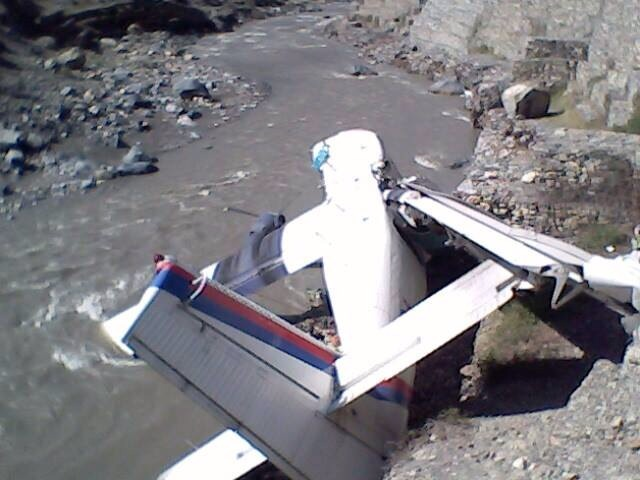
Wreckage of Nepal Airlines Flight 555

- 16 May 2013 – Nepal Airlines Flight 555, a DHC-6, overran the runway at Jomsom Airport with 21 passengers on board. The plane went down a hill and impacted the Gandaki River nose-first. All on board survived.
- 16 February 2014 – Nepal Airlines Flight 183, a DHC-6, crashed into the jungle near Dikhara, killing all 18 people on board. CFIT was the cause.
- 24 February 2016 – Tara Air Flight 193, a DHC-6, crashed into the mountainside near Dana village, Myagdi district, killing all 23 people on board.
- 26 February 2016 – an Air Kasthamandap PAC 750XL crash-landed in Chilkhaya, killing two.
- 27 May 2017 – Goma Air Flight 409, a Let L-140, crashed short of the runway threshold while attempting a landing at Tenzing–Hillary Airport in Nepal. The captain and the first officer died as a result of the accident, another crew member received injuries.
- 12 March 2018 – US-Bangla Airlines Flight 211, a Bombardier Q400, on an international flight from Dhaka to Kathmandu suffered a hard landing, veered off the runway and plowed into a field at Tribhuvan International Airport. 51 people were killed in the disaster.
- 27 February 2019 – an Air Dynasty AS350 helicopter crashed shortly after takeoff in Taplejung, killing all 7 on board.
- 29 May 2022 – Tara Air Flight 197, a Twin Otter operating on behalf of Yeti Airlines, crashed into a mountainside in the Mustang District, killing all 22 people on board.
- 15 January 2023 – Yeti Airlines Flight 691, an ATR 72-500, crashed during a domestic flight from Kathmandu to Pokhara on approach to land. The pilots had accidentally feathered the propellers. All 72 occupants were killed.
- 27 July 2024 – a Saurya Airlines CRJ200 crashed on a repositioning flight from Tribhuvan International Airport. The aircraft rotated at a lower airspeed and higher rate than usual, leading to a deep stall. Of the 19 crew members on board, only the captain survived.

=== Pakistan ===
- 27 December 1947 – an Air India Douglas C-48 crashed into the Korangi Creek, following an instrument failure in poor visibility. All 23 on board were killed.
- 8 December 1972 – PIA Flight 631, a Fokker F-27 Friendship, struck a hill near Maidan, Pakistan. All 26 people on board were killed.
- 5 July 1984 – Indian Airlines Flight 405, an Airbus A300, was hijacked during a domestic flight within India, and flown to Lahore Airport. No casualties occurred.
- 5 September 1986 – Pan Am Flight 73, a Boeing 747, was hijacked at Jinnah International Airport, Karachi. 21 were killed during the hijacking.
- 25 August 1989 – Pakistan International Airlines Flight 404, a Fokker F27 Friendship, went missing while en route to Islamabad. It presumably crashed in the Himalayas killing all 54 on board.
- 10 July 2006 – PIA Flight 688, a Fokker F27, suffered an engine failure in-flight. The pilots apparently lost spatial awareness and the aircraft crashed near Multan. All 45 aboard were killed.
- 28 July 2010 – **AirBlue Flight 202**, an Airbus A321, was on final approach to Islamabad's Benazir Bhutto International Airport when it crashed into Margalla Hills, killing all 152 people on board in Pakistan's deadliest plane crash. The Captain forgot to pull the heading indicator button, causing the plane to fly straight into the hill. The first officer was aware of this, but failed to inform the captain.
- 5 November 2010 – JS Air Flight 201, a Beechcraft 1900, crashed on takeoff from Jinnah International Airport, killing all 21 on board.
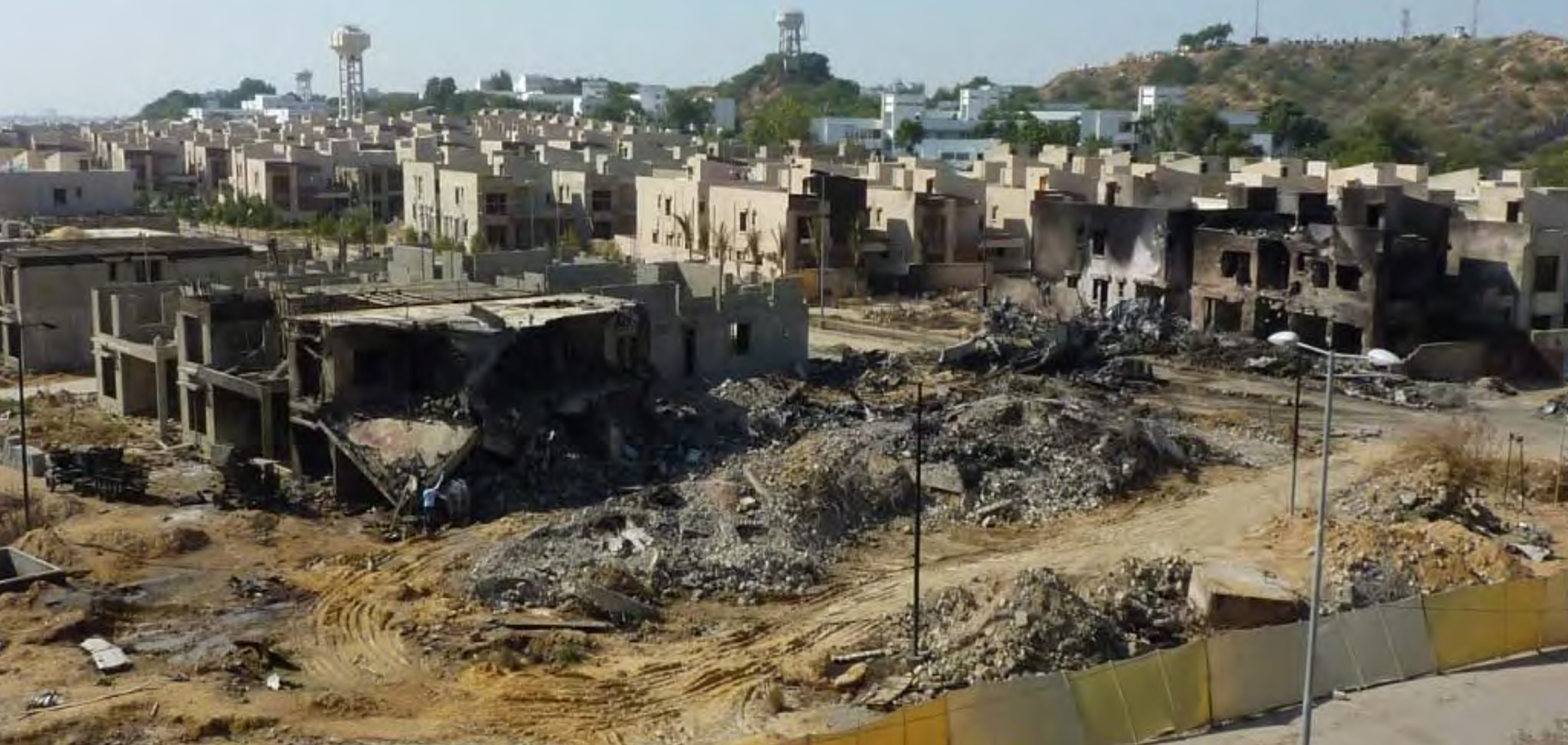
  Sun Way Flight 4412
- 28 November 2010 – Sun Way Flight 4412, an Il-76, suffered an uncontrolled engine failure on takeoff from Jinnah International Airport. The aircraft lost control and crashed while attempting to return, killing all 8 on board and 4 on the ground.
- 20 April 2012 – Bhoja Air Flight 213, a Boeing 737-200, was carrying 127 people when a microburst occurred. The plane lost altitude rapidly. Later on, it encountered a second microburst, in which both pilots failed to respond appropriately. The plane crashed into the ground and exploded into pieces, killing all 127 on board.
- 24 June 2014 – Pakistan International Airlines Flight 756, an Airbus A310, was hit by gunfire on approach to Bacha Khan International Airport in Peshawar. 1 passenger was killed.
- 7 December 2016 – Pakistan International Airlines Flight 661, an ATR 42, crashed in Havelian en route to Islamabad from Chitral killing 47 total, including famous Pakistani former singer and converted preacher of Islam Junaid Jamshed and his family members along with two sky marshals, five crew members and the Deputy Commissioner of District of Chitral.
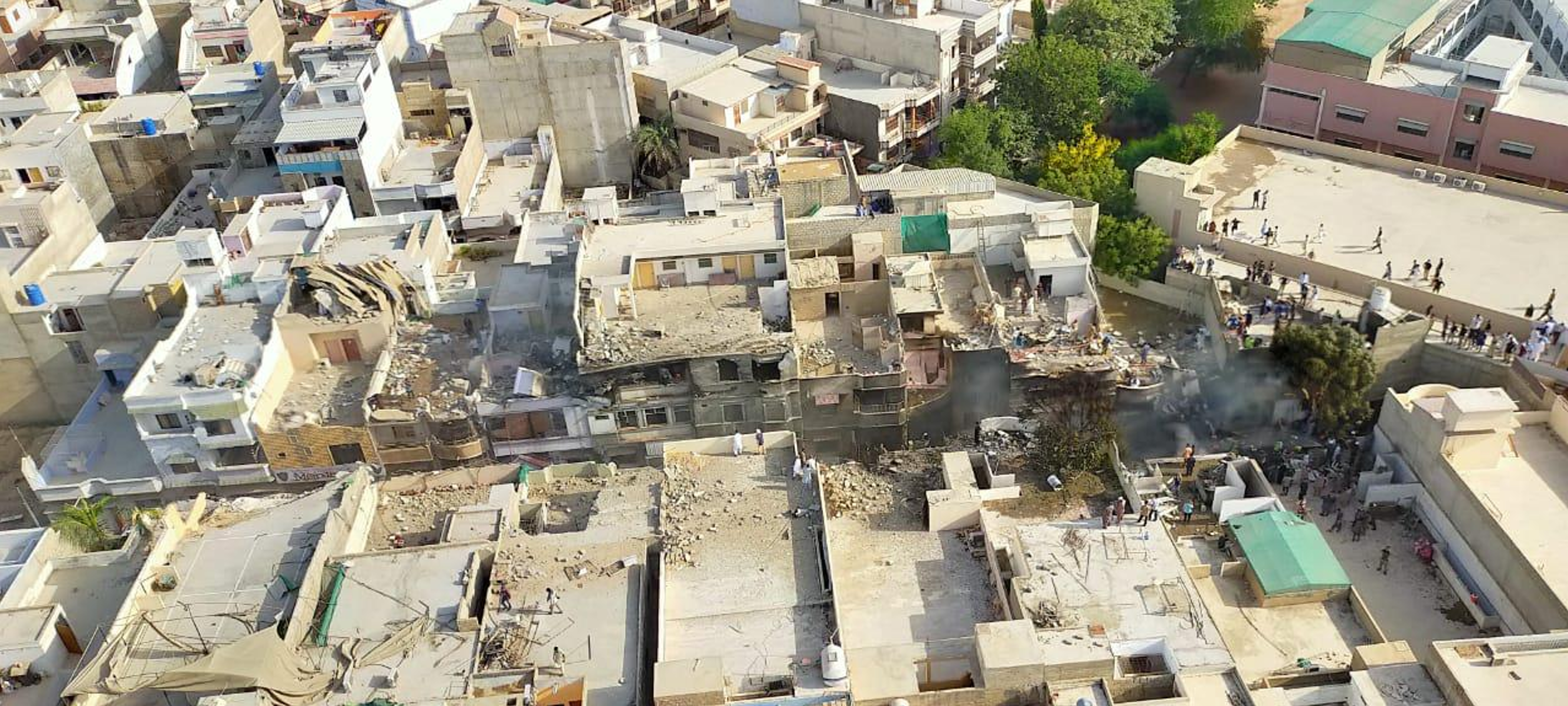
  Crash site of PIA Flight 8303
- 22 May 2020 – Pakistan International Airlines Flight 8303, an Airbus A320, crashed into houses near Karachi Airport. The aircraft had made an inadvertent belly landing and executed a go-around, then suffered a dual-engine failure on the second approach. 98 were killed including 1 on the ground; only 2 on board survived.

=== Philippines ===
- 14 July 1960 – Northwest Orient Airlines Flight 1-11, a Douglas DC-7, ditched off the coast of Polillo Island following an engine failure. One passenger was killed when she was struck by a propeller blade which had entered the fuselage; the remaining occupants survived.
- 23 November 1960 – Philippine Air Lines Flight S26, a Douglas DC-3, crashed into Mount Baco, killing all 33 on board.
- 22 December 1960 – Philippine Air Lines Flight S85, a DC-3, suffered an engine failure on takeoff from Lahug Airport and stalled. The crash killed 28 of the 37 people on board.
- 2 March 1963 – Philippine Air Lines Flight 984, a Douglas C-47, crashed into Mount Boca, killing all 27 on board.
- 28 February 1967 – Philippine Air Lines Flight 345, a Fokker F27 Friendship, lost control on approach to Mactan–Cebu International Airport due to improper weight distribution. 12 of the 19 occupants were killed.
- 6 July 1967 – Philippine Air Lines Flight 385, an F-27, crashed into Mount Kanlaon, killing all 21 on board.
- 12 September 1969 – Philippine Airlines Flight 158, a BAC One-Eleven, crashed into hills while on approach to Manila International Airport. 45 people were killed.
- 21 April 1970 – Philippine Airlines Flight 215, a HS-748, was en route to Manila when terrorists detonated a bomb that had been placed in the plane's lavatory. The plane tore apart, exploding into pieces, killing all 36 people on board.
- 23 May 1976 – Philippine Airlines Flight 116, a BAC One-Eleven, was hijacked and diverted to Zamboanga International Airport. When authorities attempted to storm the aircraft, a battle broke out, and the aircraft caught fire when grenades were thrown. 10 passengers and 3 hijackers were killed.
- 27 February 1980 – China Airlines Flight 811, a Boeing 707, crashed short of the runway at Manila Airport, killing 2 passengers.
- 26 June 1987 – Philippine Airlines Flight 206, a HS-748, impacted a mountain while in bad weather, killing all 50 people on board.
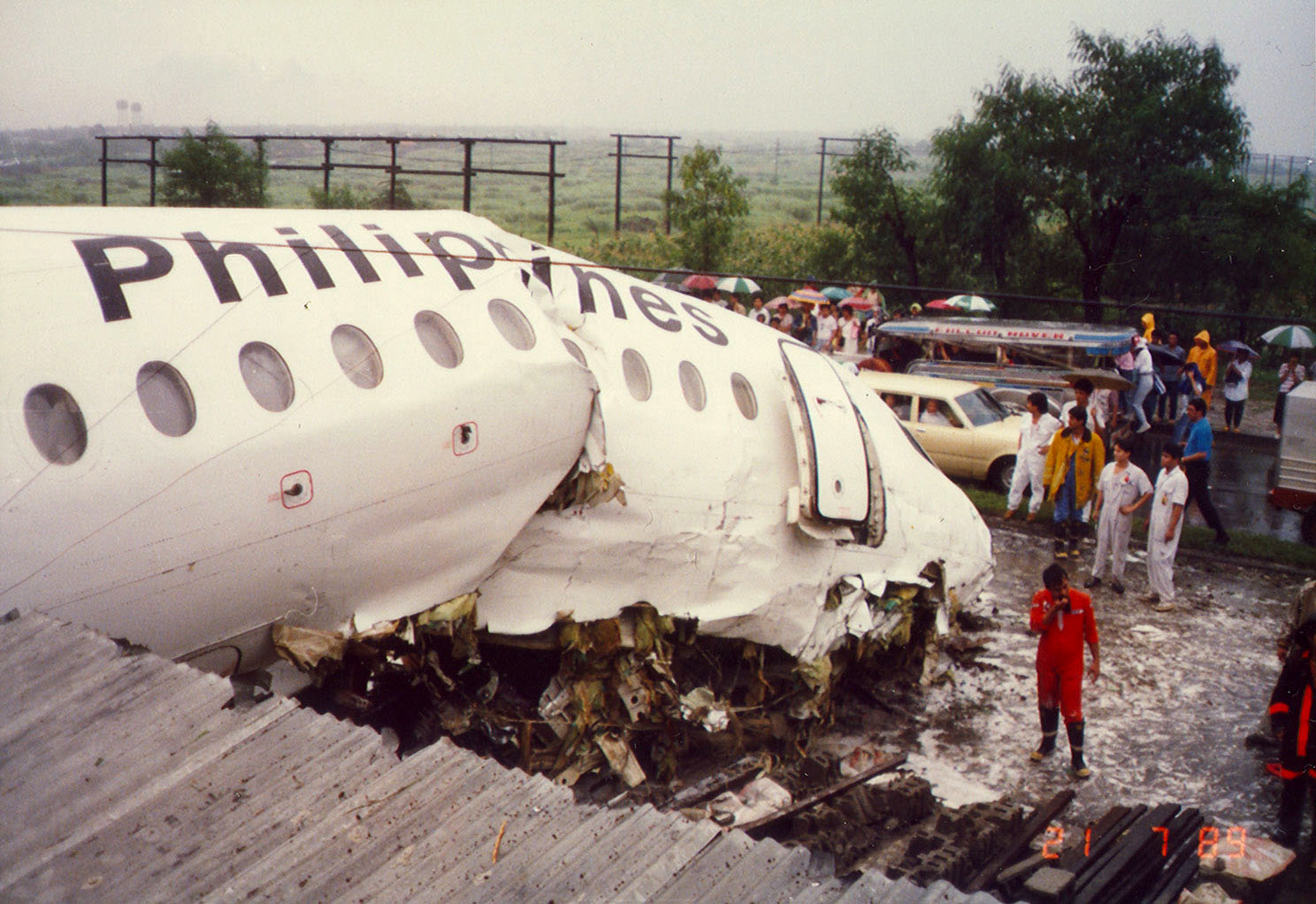
  Wreckage of Philippine Airlines Flight 124
- 13 December 1987 – Philippine Airlines Flight 443, a Short 360-300, crashed into Mount Gurain, killing all 15 people on board.
- 21 July 1989 – Philippine Airlines Flight 124, a BAC One-Eleven, overran the runway at Manila International Airport. No passengers were killed, but 8 were killed on the ground.
- 11 May 1990 – Philippine Airlines Flight 143, a Boeing 737-300, suffered a fuel tank explosion on the ground at Ninoy Aquino International Airport. 8 were killed.
- 18 May 1990 – Aerolift Philippines Flight 075, a Beechcraft 1900, crashed shortly after takeoff from Ninoy Aquino International Airport, killing all 21 on board and 4 on the ground.
- 2 February 1998 – Cebu Pacific Flight 387, a DC-9, crashed on the slopes of Mount Sumagaya. All 104 people on board perished.
- 22 March 1998 – Philippine Airlines Flight 137, an Airbus A320, was landing at Bacolod City Domestic Airport when it overran the runway and plowed into houses, killing 3 people on the ground.
- 17 October 1999 – FedEx Express Flight 087, an MD-11F, overran the runway at Subic Bay International Airport. Both pilots survived.
- 7 December 1999 – Asian Spirit Flight 100, a Let L-410 Turbolet, crashed into a mountain while carrying 17 people. Due to the massive impact force, the aircraft was pulverized. None on board made it out alive.
- 19 April 2000 – **Air Philippines Flight 541**, a Boeing 737-200, was due to land to Francisco Bangoy International Airport in Davao City when it suddenly crashed into a coconut plantation 500 feet above mean sea level. All 131 occupants on board the aircraft were killed in the worst air crash in Philippines history.
- 25 May 2000 – Philippine Airlines Flight 812, an Airbus A330, was hijacked while at cruising altitude. Later, the hijacker wanted to escape by jumping from the plane with a parachute. Before he was about to jump, he panicked and clung to the rear door, and a flight attendant pushed him out of the plane.
- 11 November 2002 – Laoag International Airlines Flight 585, a Fokker F-27 Friendship, was taking off from Manila when one of its engines suddenly failed. The pilots then decided to ditch the plane in Manila Bay but failed. The plane broke up and 19 people drowned. The cause was due to pilot error.
- 26 October 2007 – Philippine Airlines Flight 475, an Airbus A320, was a scheduled passenger flight from Manila's Ninoy Aquino International Airport to Butuan Bancasi Airport which overran the runway at Butuan Airport. Everyone survived with 19 people injured.
- 25 July 2008 – Qantas Flight 30, a Boeing 747-400, suffered an explosive decompression after an oxygen cylinder burst above the sea west of Luzon, rupturing a hole in the fuselage. The aircraft made a safe landing at Ninoy Aquino International Airport.
- 16 August 2018 – XiamenAir Flight 8667, a Boeing 737-800, veered off the runway at Ninoy Aquino International Airport in bad weather. No deaths occurred.
- 1 September 2019 – a Lionair Beechcraft King Air lost control and crashed into a resort in Calamba, killing all 9 on board.
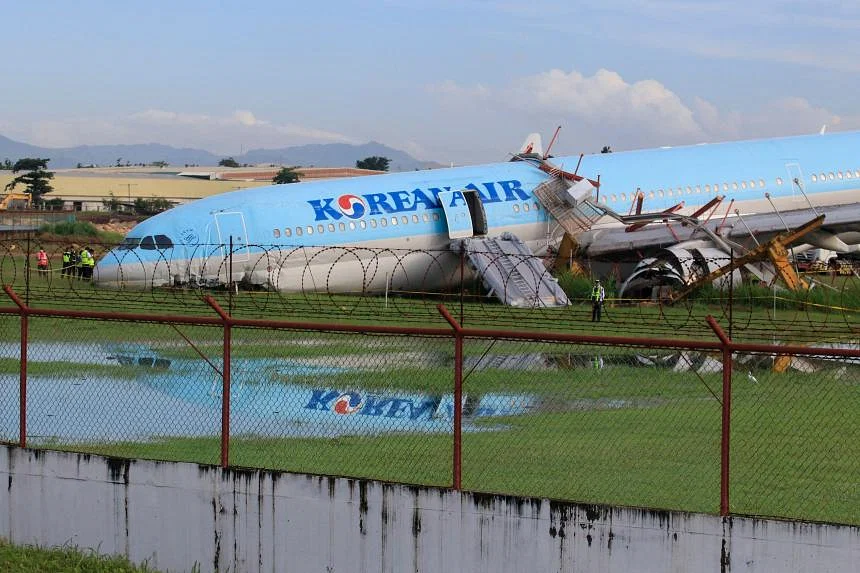
  Korean Air Flight 631 after overrunning the runway at Cebu
- 23 October 2022 – Korean Air Flight 631, an Airbus A330-300, overran the runway at Mactan–Cebu International Airport following a partial hydraulic failure. 20 were injured but no one was killed.

=== Qatar ===
- 13 March 1979 – **Alia Royal Jordanian Flight 600**, a Boeing 727, crashed on landing at Doha International Airport due to wind shear killing 45 passengers.
- 23 December 1980 – Saudia Flight 162, an L-1011 TriStar suffered an explosive decompression above the Gulf of Bahrain. Its cabin floor and fuselage ripped apart, ejecting two children out of their seats. The aircraft diverted to Doha International Airport.

=== Saudi Arabia ===
- 17 April 1964 – Middle East Airlines Flight 444, a Sud Aviation Caravelle, crashed into the Persian Gulf on approach to Dhahran International Airport, killing all 49 on board.
- 1 January 1976 – Middle East Airlines Flight 438, a Boeing 720, disintegrated in flight from an explosive detonation northwest of Qaisumah, killing all 81 on board.
- 26 November 1979 – PIA Flight 740, a Boeing 707, suffered an in-flight fire shortly after taking off from Jeddah International Airport. The fire spread into the cabin, causing mass panic among the passengers. The plane then crashed, killing all 156 people on board.
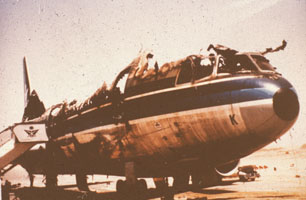
  The burnt out wreckage of Saudia Flight 163
- 19 August 1980 – **Saudia Flight 163**, a Lockheed L-1011 TriStar, after taking off from Riyadh, the cargo hold caught fire. The pilots successfully landed the plane but failed to conduct an immediate evacuation. After 26 minutes rescuers were able to open the plane door and found everyone on board had been killed by smoke inhalation.
- 25 December 1986 – Iraqi Airways Flight 163, a 737, was hijacked on the way from Baghdad to Amman, and a hand grenade exploded in the cabin. The crews initiated an emergency descent, later on another grenade went off in the cockpit, causing it to crash, killing 63 people.
- 11 July 1991 – Nigeria Airways Flight 2120, a DC-8 operated by Nationair, had departed from King Abdulaziz International Airport when one of its tires caught fire just after takeoff. The pilots tried to make it back to Jeddah, but the fire intensified and made its way to the cabin area. The flames engulfed the plane while it was still in mid-air and crashed, killing all 261 people on board.
- 15–16 March 2001 – Vnukovo Airlines Flight 2806, a Tu-154, is hijacked by terrorists and taken to Medina airport. After some negotiations, Saudi special forces storm the plane. One flight attendant, a passenger and one of the hijackers were killed.
- 27 July 2010 – Lufthansa Cargo Flight 8460, an MD-11F, bounced and crashed on landing at King Khalid International Airport. Both pilots survived with injuries.

=== Singapore ===
- 13 March 1954 – a **BOAC Lockheed Constellation crashed** on landing at Singapore-Kallang Airport when it struck a seawall and burst into flames, killing 33 of the 40 on board.
- 26–27 March 1991 – Singapore Airlines Flight 117, an Airbus A310, was hijacked en route from Kuala Lumpur to Singapore. The aircraft landed safely at Changi Airport, where the aircraft was eventually stormed and the 4 hijackers were killed.
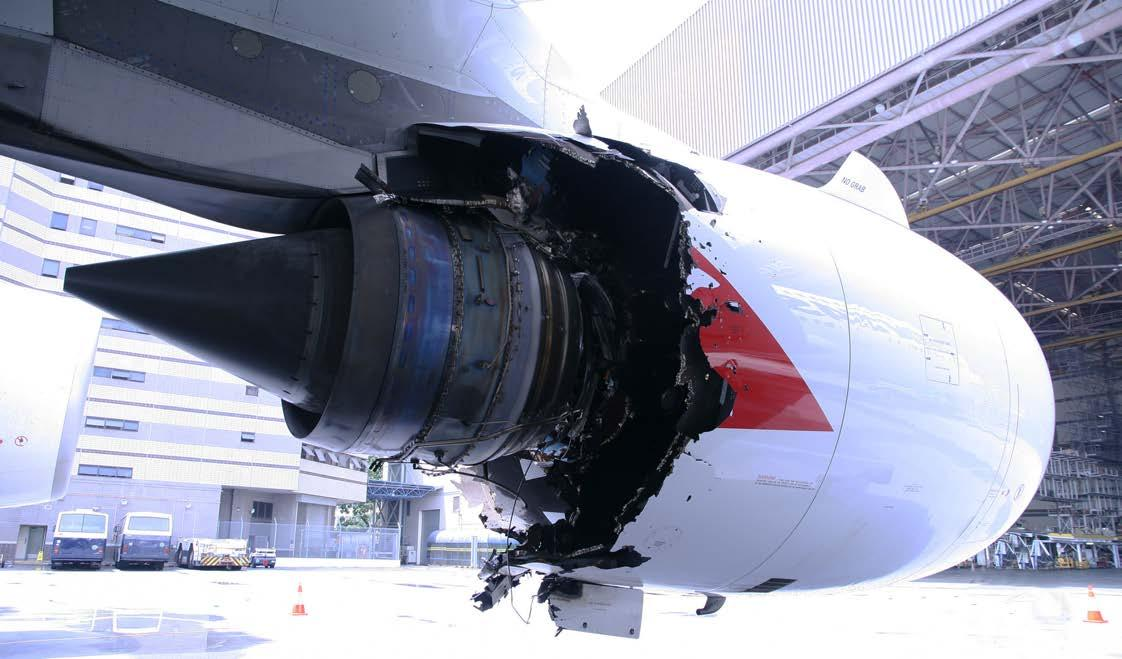
  Damage to Qantas Flight 32
- 4 November 2010 – Qantas Flight 32, Airbus A380 from London to Sydney with a fuel stopover in Singapore, suffered a catastrophic engine failure over Indonesia. The engine exploded and parts of it were strewn over the Indonesian Island of Batam. The flight was forced to make an emergency landing at Changi Airport. Everyone on board survived.

=== South Korea ===
- 11 December 1969 – a Korean Air Lines NAMC YS-11 was hijacked in South Korean airspace. The passengers were abducted to North Korea – most were returned but 11 remained missing.
- 19 November 1980 – Korean Air Lines Flight 015, a Boeing 747-200, was on approach to Gimpo International Airport when the pilots reported some problem with the controls. It hit an embankment slope, slid down, and caught fire, killing 15 people.
- 5 May 1983 – CAAC Flight 296, a Hawker Siddeley Trident, was hijacked on a domestic flight within China and flown to Camp Page. No one was killed.
- 25 November 1989 – Korean Air Flight 175, a Fokker F28 Fellowship, suffered an engine failure on takeoff and crashed at Gimpo International Airport. No one was killed.
- 26 July 1993 – Asiana Airlines Flight 733, a Boeing 737-500, was on approach to Mokpo Airport in VOR when suddenly it hit a ridge, killing 68 people on board. Pilot error was blamed for the accident, as the pilots started a descent while passing over the mountain peak.
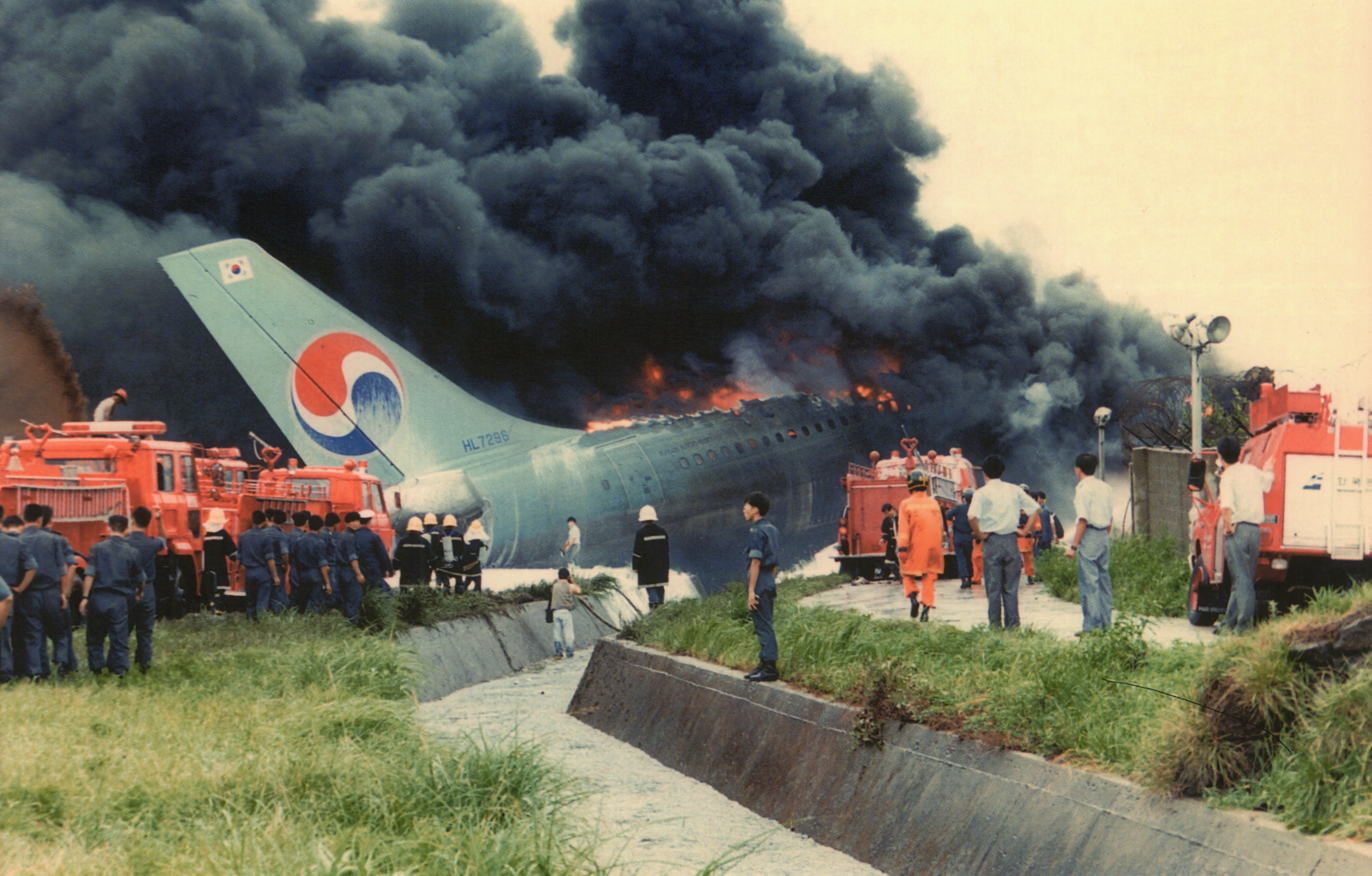
  The wreckage of Korean Air Flight 2033 at Jeju
- 10 August 1994 – Korean Air Flight 2033, an Airbus A300-B4, overran the runway at Jeju International Airport and caught fire. All 160 on board escaped the aircraft.
- 5 August 1998 – Korean Air Flight 8702, a Boeing 747-400, overran the runway at Gimpo International Airport. No one was killed.
- 15 March 1999 – Korean Air Flight 1533, an MD-83, overran the runway at Pohang Gyeongju Airport. No one was killed but the aircraft was destroyed.
- 15 April 2002 – Air China Flight 129, a Boeing 767-200, was on approach to Gimhae International Airport, when crashed into a mountain killing 129 people on board out of 166 people. The pilot was not aware of their proximity to the ground due to bad weather condition until it was too late to recover.
- 29 December 2024 – **Jeju Air Flight 2216**, a Boeing 737-800, overran the runway during a belly landing at Muan International Airport, killing 179 people and leaving 2 survivors. The aircraft was destroyed.
- 28 January 2025 – Air Busan Flight 391, an Airbus A321, suffered a ground fire at Gimhae International Airport. All 176 on board were evacuated.

=== Sri Lanka ===
- 4 December 1974 – **Martinair Flight 138**, a Douglas DC-8 operating on behalf of Garuda Indonesia, flew into a mountain, killing all 191 people on board. To date, it remains the deadliest air disaster in Sri Lankan aviation history.
- 15 November 1978 – Loftleiðir Flight 001, a Douglas DC-8 on a charter flight for Garuda Indonesia, crashed into a coconut plantation while on approach to Katunayake, Sri Lanka for a refueling stop. 78 survived, but 184 were killed.
- 3 May 1986 – Air Lanka Flight 512, a Lockheed L-1011, was taxiing for take-off to Malé when a time bomb exploded and ripped the cabin, split it into two. 21 people were killed. The bomb was intended to explode in mid-flight, but was delayed.
- 29 September 1998 – Lionair Flight 602, an Antonov An-24, was shot down and crashed off the coast of the Mannar district, killing all 55 people on board.
- 24 July 2001 – several SriLankan Airlines aircraft were destroyed or damaged in the Bandaranaike Airport attack.

=== Syria ===
- 19 June 1947 – Pan Am Flight 121, a Lockheed Constellation, crashed into the Syrian Desert after suffering an engine failure and in-flight fire. 15 of the 36 on board were killed.
- 20 August 1975 – **ČSA Flight 540**, an Ilyushin Il-62 flying to Tehran, was stopping in approach to Damascus International Airport in clear weather condition when it crashed and burst into flames, 17 km from the airport. Only two people survived of the 128 on board. An investigation concluded that CFIT was the cause of the deadliest plane crash in Syria's aviation history.
- 20 September 2012 – Syrian Arab Airlines Flight 501, an Airbus A320, collided with a Syrian Air Force Mil Mi-17 helicopter. The helicopter crashed killing all 4 on board, but the A320, missing a large section of its vertical stabiliser, was able to land at Damascus International Airport safely.

=== Taiwan ===
- 20 June 1964 – Civil Air Transport Flight 106, a Curtiss C-46, crashed in Shengang, killing all 57 on board.
- 16 February 1968 – Civil Air Transport Flight 10, a Boeing 727, crashed in Linkou, killing 21 of the 63 on board.
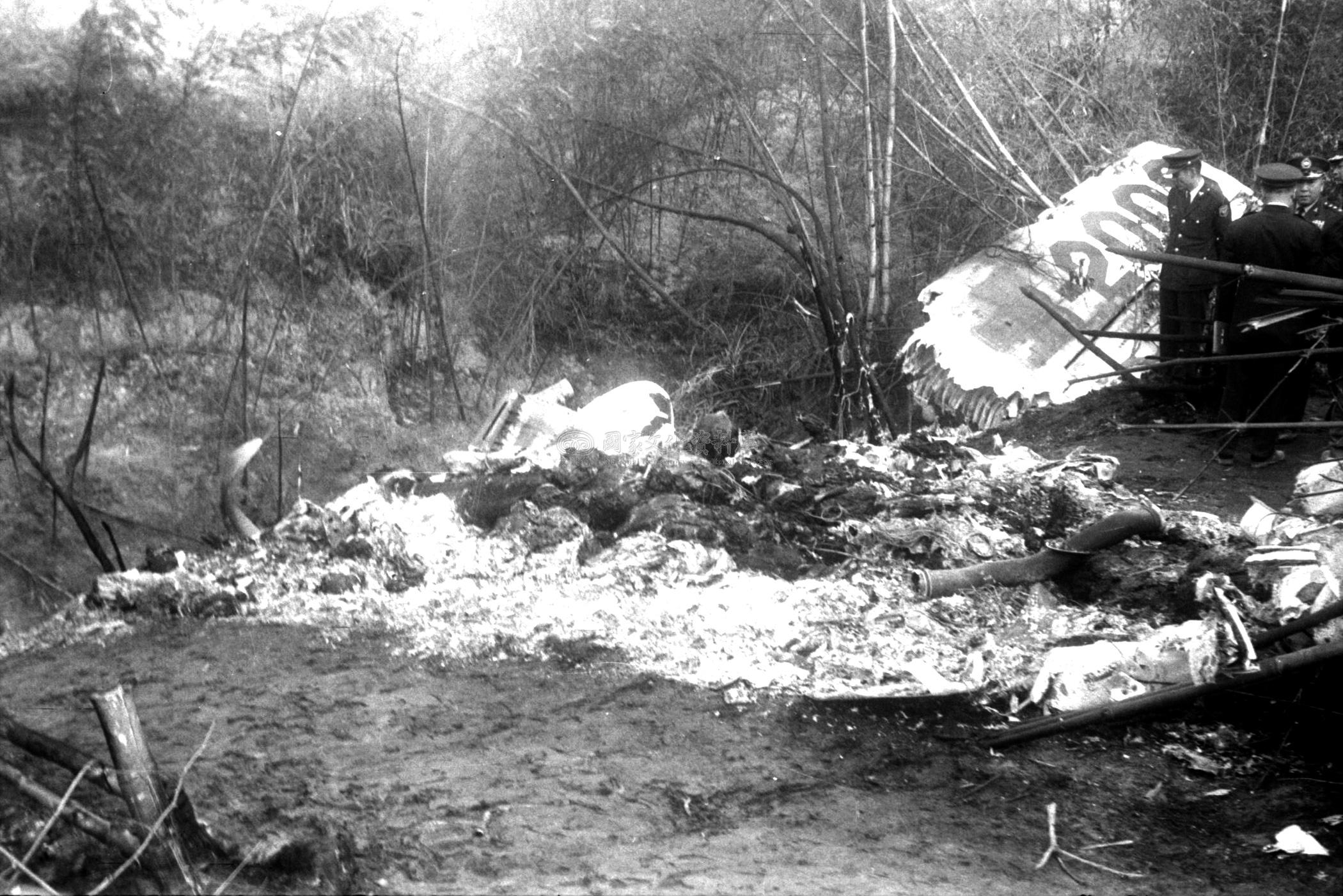
  Far Eastern Air Transport Flight 104
- 24 February 1969 – Far Eastern Air Transport Flight 104, a Handley Page Dart Herald, crashed near Tainan after suffering an engine failure, killing all 36 on board.
- 12 August 1970 – China Airlines Flight 206, a NAMC YS-11, crashed into a bamboo grove near the top of Yuan Mountain after entered inclement weather condition, killing 14 people.
- 31 July 1975 – Far Eastern Air Transport Flight 134, a Vickers Viscount, encountered a microburst on landing at Taipei Songshan Airport and crashed, killing 27.
- 22 August 1981 – Far Eastern Air Transport Flight 103, a Boeing 737-200, disintegrated and broke apart in mid-air over Miaoli County, killing all 110 people on board. Severe corrosion led to the aircraft's destruction.
- 16 February 1986 – China Airlines Flight 2265, a Boeing 737, crashed into the Pacific Ocean while executing a missed approach from Penghu Airport. All 13 on board were killed.
- 26 October 1989 – China Airlines Flight 204, a Boeing 737-200, departed from the wrong runway at Hualien Airport. Following the departure procedure for the correct runway, the aircraft flew towards the mountains and crashed, killing all 54 on board.
- 29 December 1991 – China Airlines Flight 358, a Boeing 747-200 freighter, crashed in Wanli after the number 3 and 4 engines had detached from the aircraft. All 5 crew were killed.
- 30 January 1995 – TransAsia Airways Flight 510A, an ATR 72 on a ferry flight, crashed in Guishan, killing all 4 crew members.
- 5 April 1996 – Formosa Airlines Flight 7613, a Dornier 228, crashed on approach to Matsu Beigan Airport, killing 6 of the 17 on board.
- 10 August 1997 – Formosa Airlines Flight 7601, a Dornier 228, crashed on a go-around from Matsu Beigan Airport, killing all 16 on board.
- 16 February 1998 – **China Airlines Flight 676**, an Airbus A300, stalled and crashed on a go-around at Chiang Kai Shek airport, killing all 196 passengers and crew of the aircraft and six persons on the ground.
- 18 March 1998 – Formosa Airlines Flight 7623, a Saab 340, crashed into the sea shortly after take-off after an electrical failure. All 13 on board died.
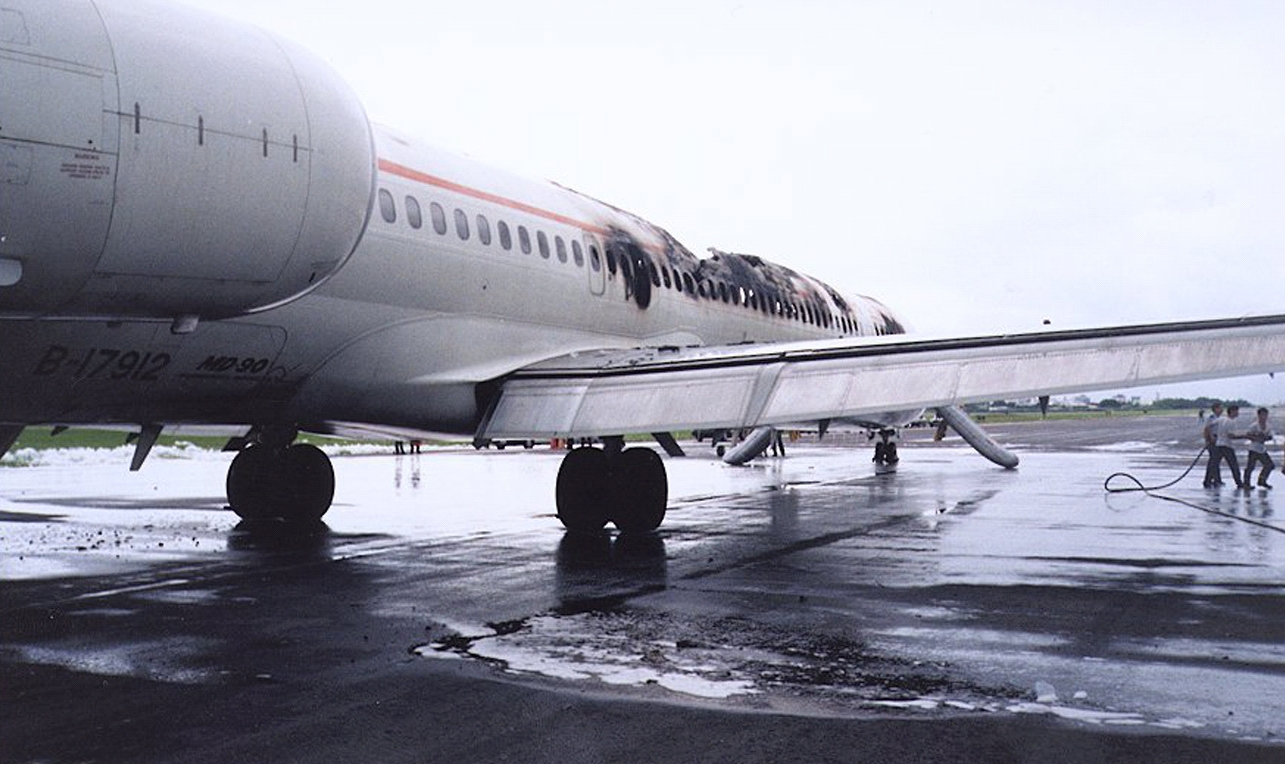
  Uni Air Flight 873
- 24 August 1999 – Uni Air Flight 873, an MD-90, suffered an explosion on landing at Hualien Airport due to combustable materials in the overhead baggage racks. One passenger died from his injuries.
- 31 October 2000 – Singapore Airlines Flight 006, a Boeing 747-400, was starting to take off when it hit a ground maintenance vehicle at Chiang Kai-shek International Airport near Taipei, Taiwan. 83 people died as the result. The plane was taking off from the wrong runway which was closed for maintenance.
- 21 December 2002 – TransAsia Airways Flight 791, an ATR 72, lost control and crashed due to atmospheric icing. Both pilots were killed.
- 23 July 2014 – TransAsia Airways Flight 222, an ATR 72, attempted to land in Huxi, Taiwan, in bad weather. The aircraft crashed into several houses injuring 5 people on the ground. Ten survived of the 58 people aboard. The cause was pilot error.
- 4 February 2015 – TransAsia Airways Flight 235, an ATR 72, was flying over Taipei when one of its engines failed. The ATR 72 then rolled sharply to the left, clipped a taxi and the Huandong Viaduct. It impacted Keelung River in an upside-down condition. 43 people out of 58 people were killed. The investigation showed the pilots had incorrectly shut down the functioning engine. Moments the plane crashed was captured by a motorist and CCTV.

=== Tajikistan ===
- 3 September 1970 – Aeroflot Flight Sh-4, a Yakovlev Yak-40, crashed into a mountain in the Asht District, killing all 21 on board.
- 24 February 1973 – Aeroflot Flight 630, an Ilyushin Il-18, crashed near Leninabad Airport, killing all 79 on board.
- 28 August 1993 – a Yakovlev Yak-40 operated by Tajikistan Airlines **crashed shortly after takeoff** from Khorog Airport, hit a boulder and plunged into the Panj River, killing 82 people in the deadliest plane crash in Tajikistan. Overloading was blamed.

=== Thailand ===
- 19 July 1962 – United Arab Airlines Flight 869, a De Havilland Comet, crashed into Khao Yai National Park, killing all 26 on board.
- 25 December 1976 – EgyptAir Flight 864, a Boeing 707, was on final approach to Bangkok's Don Mueang International Airport when it rolled and crashed into an industrial complex in Bangkok, killing all 52 people on board. 19 people on the ground were also killed. The investigators concluded that the cause was pilot error.
- 27 April 1980 – Thai Airways Flight 231, a Hawker Siddeley HS 748, was on approach to Bangkok when it entered a thunderstorm. A downdraft struck the plane, causing it to stall. It crashed into the ground, killing 44 people out of 53 people on board.
- 28 March 1981 – Garuda Indonesian Airways Flight 206, a DC-9, was hijacked and flown to Don Mueang International Airport, where it was stormed by Kopassus Special Forces. One agent was killed along with 5 hijackers and the pilot.
- 31 August 1987 – Thai Airways Flight 365, a Boeing 737-200, crashed off Ko Phuket due to pilot error, killing all 83 on board.
- 9 September 1988 – Vietnam Airlines Flight 831, a Tupolev Tu-134, crashed into a rice field near Semafahkarm Village, Tambon Khu Khot. 76 people were killed.
- 21 November 1990 – Bangkok Airways Flight 125, a DHC-8-100, lost control and crashed near Koh Samui Airport, killing all 38 on board.
- 26 May 1991 – **Lauda Air Flight 004**, a Boeing 767-300, was flying over Phu Toei National Park when it broke up in mid-flight over the jungle near Suphan Buri and Ban Nong Rong, killing everyone on board in Thailand's worst aviation disaster. The cause was an uncommanded thrust reverser on engine no. 1. Flight 004 was known for Niki Lauda's contribution to the investigation.
- 11 December 1998 – Thai Airways International Flight 261, an Airbus A310, made a third attempt to land the plane after the second failed attempt when the plane stalled with a high angle of attack and crashed into a paddy field on approach to Surat Thani Airport amid heavy rains and poor visibility. 101 people were killed while 45 others survived.
- 23 September 1999 – Qantas Flight 1, a Boeing 747-400, overran the runway at Don Mueang International Airport. None of the 410 on board were killed.
- 3 March 2001 – Thai Airways International Flight 114, a Boeing 737-400, exploded while parked at Don Mueang Airport, killing one (a flight attendant) of eight on board; an assassination attempt was theorized as traces of explosives were found in the wreckage.
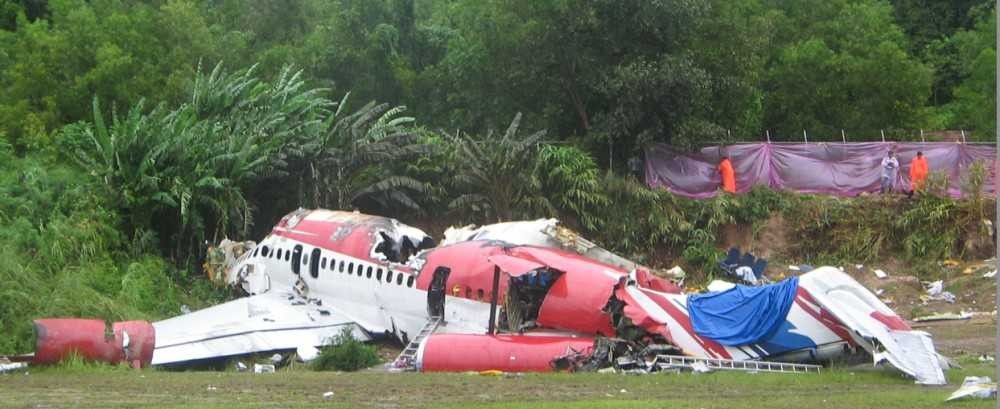
  One-Two-GO Airlines Flight 269
- 16 September 2007 – One-Two-GO Airlines Flight 269, a McDonnell Douglas MD-82, attempted to land in wind shear and strong winds at Phuket International Airport. The plane failed to land, rose sharply over the runway, stalled, crashed, and burst into flames killing 90 people. Pilot error was blamed.
- 4 August 2009 – Bangkok Airways Flight 266, an ATR 72, overran the runway on landing and crashed into a disused control tower at Koh Samui Airport. The pilot of the plane was the only person killed in the incident.
- 22 August 2024 – Thai Flying Service Flight 209, a Cessna 208, crashed in Bang Pakong, killing all 9 on board.

=== Turkey ===
- 3 August 1953 – Air France Flight 152, a Lockheed L-749A Constellation, ditched into the Mediterranean Sea off Kızılada, Fethiye. 4 people were killed.
- 23 April 1959 – an Avro Tudor operated by Air Charter Limited crashed into Mount Süphan, killing all 12 on board.
- 19 January 1960 – Scandinavian Airlines System Flight 871, a Sud Aviation Caravelle, crashed to high ground during its approach to land at Esenboğa International Airport, killing all 42 people on board.
- 23 September 1961 – Turkish Airlines Flight 835, a Fokker F27, crashed into a hill on final approach to Ankara Airport, killing 28 of the 29 people on board.
- 21 December 1961 – British European Airways Flight 226, a de Havilland Comet operating on behalf of Cyprus Airways, stalled and crashed shortly after takeoff from Ankara Airport, killing 27.
- 8 March 1962 – a Turkish Airlines Fokker F27 crashed into Mount Medetsiz on approach to Adana Airport, killing all 11 on board.
- 1 February 1963 – the Ankara mid-air collision occurred when Middle East Airlines Flight 265, a Vickers Viscount, collided with a Turkish Air Force Douglas C-47. Both planes crashed in Ankara, killing all 14 on both aircraft and 87 on the ground.
- 21 January 1972 – a Turkish Airlines DC-9 crashed on a ferry flight near Adana Airport, where it was attempting an emergency landing. 1 crew member was killed.
- 26 January 1974 – Turkish Airlines Flight 301, a Fokker F28, stalled on crashed on takeoff from Izmir Airport, killing 67 people.
- 30 January 1975 – Turkish Airlines Flight 345, a Fokker F28, crashed into the Sea of Marmara on a go-around from Atatürk Airport, killing all 42 on board.
- 19 September 1976 – **Turkish Airlines Flight 452**, a Boeing 727-2F2, flew into the slope of a hill at Karatepe in Isparta, killing 154 people.
- 23 December 1979 – a Turkish Airlines Fokker F28 crashed on approach to Ankara Airport, killing 41.
- 16 January 1983 – Turkish Airlines Flight 158, a Boeing 727, crashed during its final approach to land at Ankara Esenboğa Airport, killing 47.
- 2 January 1988 – Condor Flugdienst Flight 3782, a Boeing 737-230, crashed into Dümentepe Hill during its final approach to land at Adnan Menderes Airport. All 16 people on board were killed.
- 29 December 1994 – Turkish Airlines Flight 278, a Boeing 737-4Y0, crashed during its final approach to land at Van Ferit Melen Airport, killing 57.
- 7 April 1999 – Turkish Airlines Flight 5904, a Boeing 737-4Q8 on a ferry flight, crashed in Ceyhan 8 minutes after takeoff from Adana Şakirpaşa Airport. All 6 crew members were killed.
- 8 January 2003 – Turkish Airlines Flight 634, an Avro RJ100, crashed on its final approach during landing at Diyarbakır Airport, killing 75.
- 26 May 2003 – Ukrainian-Mediterranean Airlines Flight 4230, a Yakovlev Yak-42, crashed on approach to Trabzon Airport, killing all 75 on board.
- 30 November 2007 – Atlasjet Flight 4203, a McDonnell Douglas MD-83, crashed on a hill during descent to Isparta Süleyman Demirel Airport, killing 57.
- 13 January 2018 – Pegasus Airlines Flight 8622, a Boeing 737-800, overran the runway at Trabzon Airport. No one was killed.
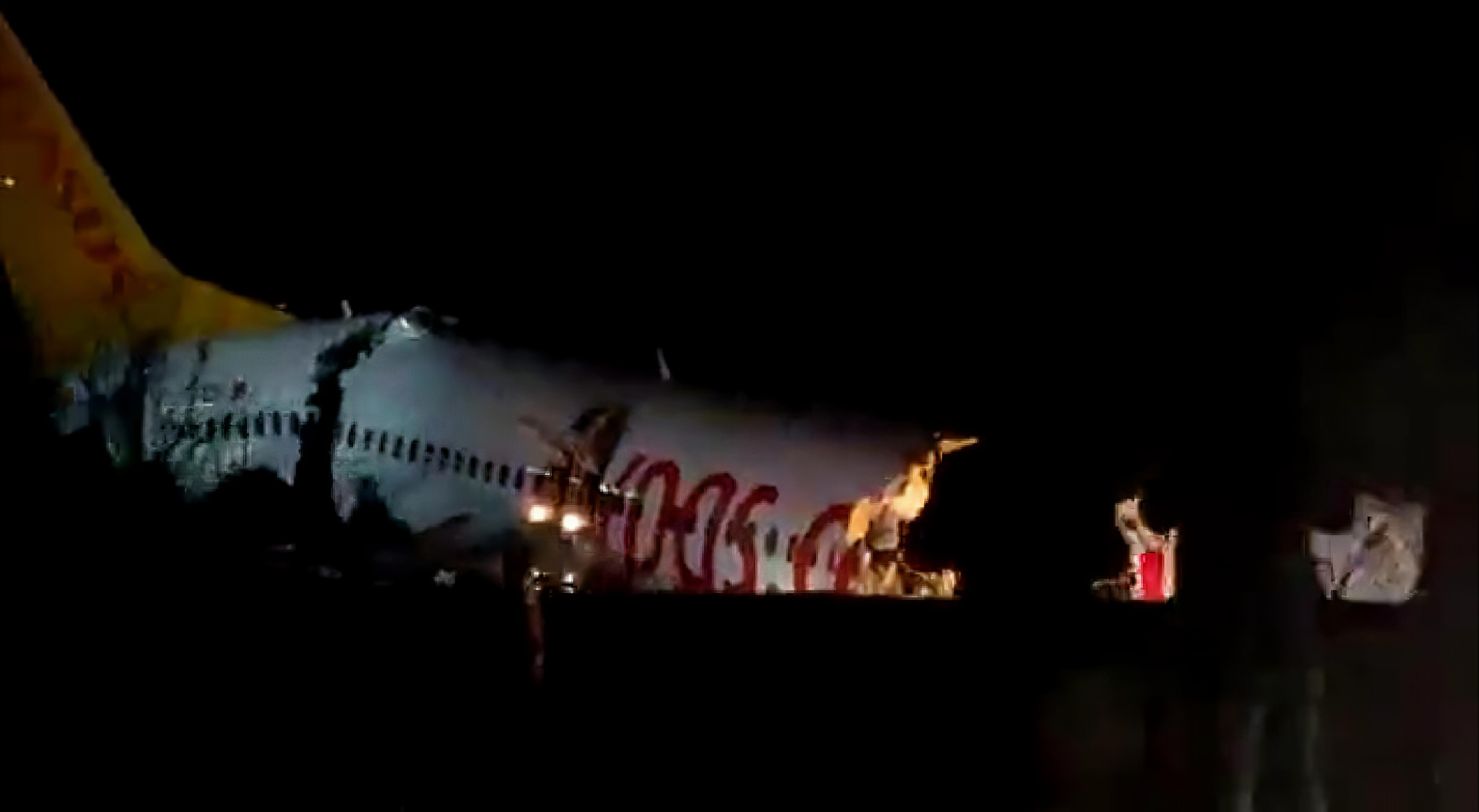
  Pegasus Airlines Flight 2193
- 5 February 2020 – Pegasus Airlines Flight 2193, a Boeing 737-800, overran the runway at Istanbul Sabiha Gökçen Airport, killing 3 people.

=== Turkmenistan ===
- 5 March 1963 – Aeroflot Flight 191, an Ilyushin Il-18, crashes on approach to Ashgabat due to a dust storm. 12 people are killed.
- 15 August 1975 – **Aeroflot Flight A-53**, a Yakovlev Yak-40, crashes on approach to Krasnovodsk. 23 out of 38 on board are killed.
- 18 January 1988 – Aeroflot Flight 699, a Tupolev Tu-154, lands heavily at Krasnovodsk and crashes. 11 people are killed.

=== United Arab Emirates ===
- 14 March 1972 – **Sterling Airways Flight 296**, Sud Aviation Caravelle carrying 112 people, crashed into a mountain ridge near Kalba, killing all aboard. An outdated flight plan and/or a misreading of weather radar was the cause.
- 23 September 1983 – **Gulf Air Flight 771**, a Boeing 737-200, was bombed and crashed near Jebel Ali, killing all 112 on board.
- 24 August 1984 – Indian Airlines Flight 421, a 737, was hijacked and flown to Lahore, Karachi, then Dubai International Airport, where the UAE defence minister negotiated the release of all hostages.
- 15 December 1997 – Tajikistan Airlines Flight 3183, a Tupolev Tu-154, was carrying 86 people to Sharjah airport. The Tupolev Tu-154 crashed, disintegrated into the desert, leaving the flight navigator the only survivor.
- 21 September 2001 – Aeroflot Flight 521, an Ilyushin Il-86, made an inadvertent belly landing at Dubai International Airport. No one was killed.
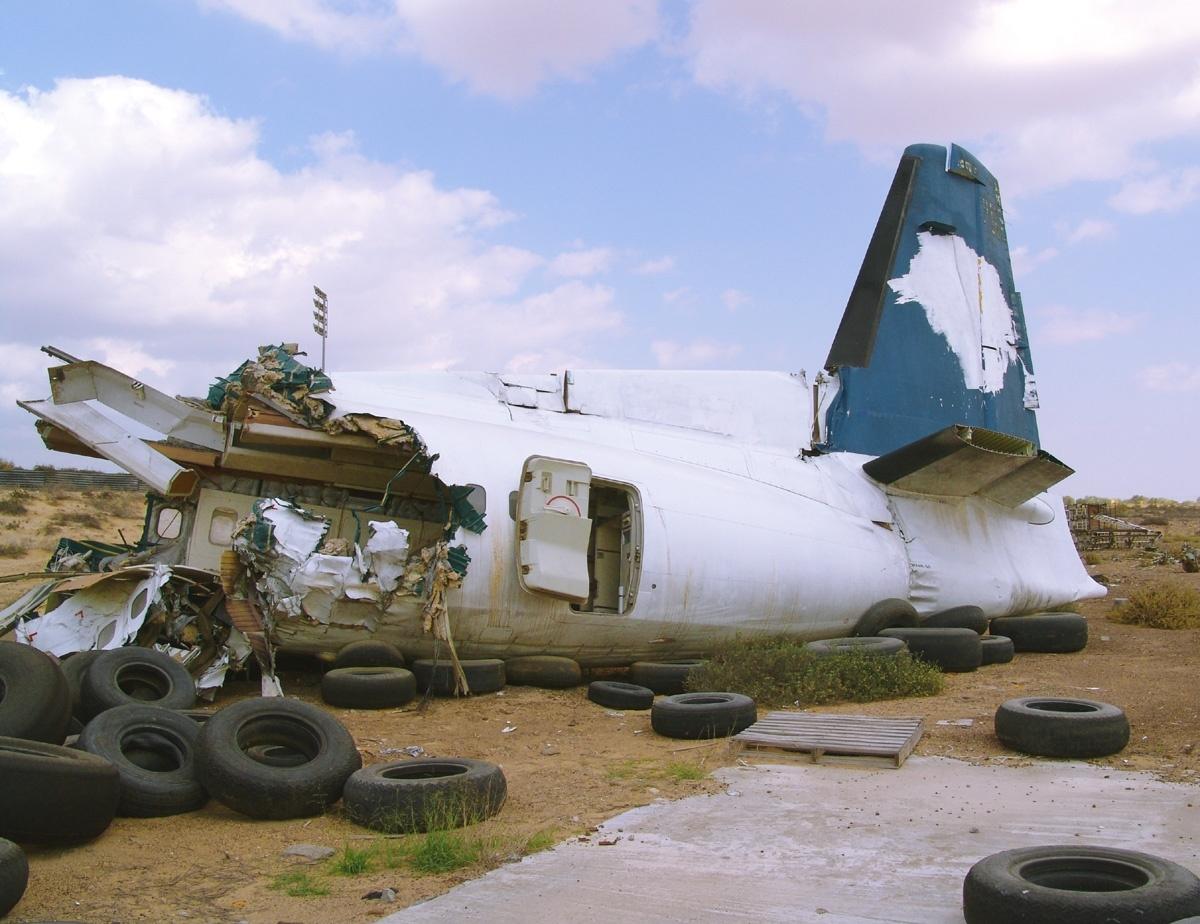
  Debris left of Kish Air Flight 7170
- 10 February 2004 – Kish Air Flight 7170, a Fokker 50, was due to land from Kish Island in Iran to Sharjah Airport when it spiraled and crashed, killing 43 people on board. The pilot accidentally selected the propellers into reverse thrust in mid-air causing it to spiral down out of control.
- 21 October 2009 – Sudan Airways Flight 2241, a Boeing 707 operated by Azza Air Transport, stalled and crashed while attempting to return to Sharjah International Airport after an engine cowling detached. All 6 crew members were killed.
- 3 September 2010 – UPS Airlines Flight 6, a Boeing 747-400 attempted to return to Dubai Airport while suffering an in-flight fire. The aircraft crashed at Nad Al Sheba Military Camp, killing both pilots.
- 3 August 2016 – Emirates Flight 521, a Boeing 777-31H, crashed on the runway at Dubai International Airport during a go-around attempt. All 300 people on board made it out, but a firefighter was killed tackling the blaze.

=== Uzbekistan ===
- 14 December 1942 – an Aeroflot Tupolev ANT-20 crashed near Tashkent, killing all 36 on board. The captain had let an off-duty pilot take over the controls, who inadvertently put the aircraft into a dive.
- 6 February 1970 – Aeroflot Flight U-45, an Ilyushin Il-18, crashed on approach to Samarkand International Airport, killing 92.
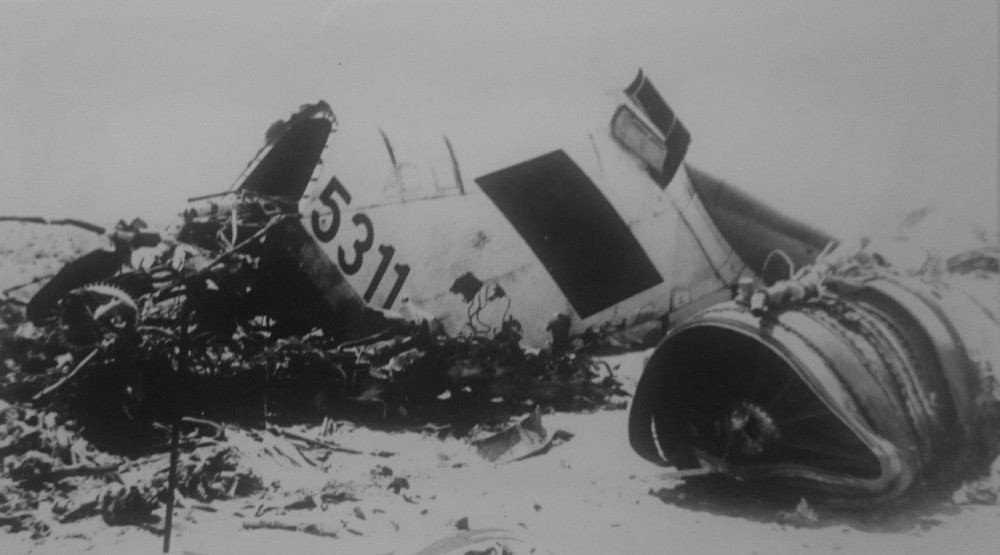
  Aeroflot Flight 5143
- 10 July 1985 – **Aeroflot Flight 5143**, a Tu-154, while cruising at an altitude of 38,100 ft, entered a flat spin. The crews were not able to recover it and the plane crashed near Uchuduk. All 200 people on board the aircraft perished in the deadliest plane crash in Uzbekistan as well as the deadliest plane crash involving a Tupolev Tu-154.
- 16 January 1987 – Aeroflot Flight 505, a Yakovlev Yak-40, banked sharply to the right and crashedshortly after take-off from Tashkent, killing all 9 people on board. The plane encountered a wake vortex formed by an Ilyushin Il-76 that had taken off minutes before Flight 505.
- 23 March 1991 – an Aeroflot An-24 overran the runway at Navoi International Airport, killing 34.
- 13 January 2004 – Uzbekistan Airways Flight 1154, a Yakovlev Yak-40, overran the runway on a foggy night at Tashkent International Airport, clipped a ground structure, and somersaulted. The aircraft then exploded and burst into flames, killing all 37 aboard.

=== Vietnam ===
- 24 December 1966 – a Canadair CL-44 of Flying Tiger Line **crashed into Binh Thai Village** near Da Nang, killing all 4 on board and 107 on the ground.
- 15 June 1972 – Cathay Pacific Flight 700Z, a Convair CV880, was destroyed by a bomb above Pleiku. All 81 people on board were killed.
- 2 July 1972 – Pan Am Flight 841, a Boeing 747, was hijacked over the South China Sea. The captain overpowered and killed the hijacker, and landed at Tan Son Nhut Air Base.
- 15 September 1974 – Air Vietnam Flight 706, a Boeing 727, was hijacked, then crashed after a missed approach at Phan Rang Air Base, when the hijackers detonated grenades. All 75 on board were killed.
- 4 September 1992 – Vietnam Airlines Flight 850, an Airbus A310 operated by Jes Air, was hijacked over Vietnam. The hijacker opened the door and dropped leaflets over Ho Chi Minh City before parachuting out. No one was harmed and the aircraft landed safely.
- 14 November 1992 – Vietnam Airlines Flight 474, a Yakovlev Yak-40, was carrying 31 people when it crashed into terrain near Son Trung during Cyclone Forrest. The only survivor, Dutch passenger Annette Herfkens, spent eight days alone in the forest, with only rainwater.

=== Yemen ===
- 22–23 February 1972 – Lufthansa Flight 649, a Boeing 747, was hijacked and flown to Aden International Airport, where the aircraft and passengers were seized. They were released the next day.
- 19 March 1972 – **EgyptAir Flight 763**, a McDonnell Douglas DC-9 operated by Inex-Adria, while approaching Aden International Airport, crashed into the Shamsans Mountain, killing all 30 people on board.

=== Various countries ===
- 20 July 1973 – Japan Air Lines Flight 404, a Boeing 747, was hijacked over the Netherlands, and was flown to Dubai International Airport, where it was held for several days. After the Israeli government denied the hijackers' demands to release Kōzō Okamoto, the aircraft was flown to Damascus then Benghazi, where the aircraft was destroyed. 1 hijacker inadvertently killed herself above Europe when she accidentally detonated a grenade.
- 24–31 December 1999 – Indian Airlines Flight 814, an Airbus A300, was hijacked on the way to India, and flown to India, Pakistan, the UAE, and Afghanistan before the passengers were released; 1 passenger was killed by the hijackers.

== Central America ==
=== Antigua and Barbuda ===
- 7 October 2012 – **FlyMontserrat Flight 107**, a Britten-Norman Islander, shortly after takeoff from V. C. Bird International Airport, encountered an engine failure. The pilot apparently lost control of the plane, crashing just off the runway and bursting into flames. 3 out of 4 occupants were killed, including the pilot.

=== Bahamas ===
- 12 September 1980 – **Florida Commuter Airlines Flight 65**, a DC-3, crashed into the ocean off the coast of the Bahamas, killing all 34 on board.

=== Bermuda ===
- 6 December 1952 – a Cubana de Aviación Douglas DC-4 **stalled and impacted tail first with the sea**. 37 people were killed. 4 people survived the fall.

=== Barbados ===
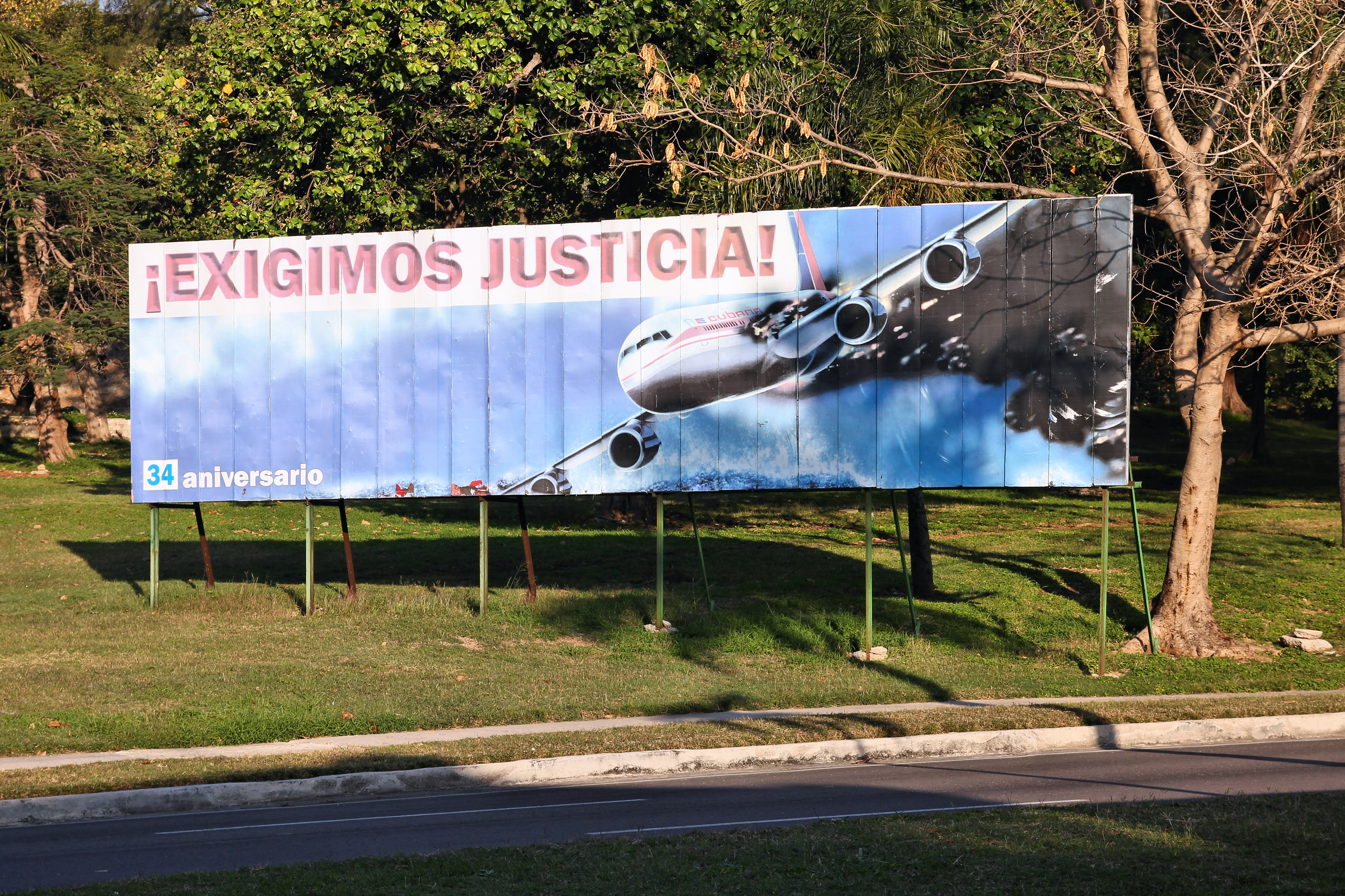
Billboard demanding justice for Cubana Flight 455

- 6 October 1976 – **Cubana de Aviación Flight 455**, a Douglas DC-8, eleven minutes after takeoff, two bombs exploded and ripped the DC-8 to pieces. The aircraft pieces fell to the water, all 73 people on board were killed. Cuba blamed the US and CIA for the bombing.

=== Bonaire ===
- 22 October 2009 – **Divi Divi Air Flight 014**, a Britten-Norman Islander, ditched off the coast of Bonaire following an engine failure. The 9 passengers escaped, but the pilot was killed.

=== Costa Rica ===
- 23 May 1988 – LACSA Flight 628, a Boeing 727, crashed on takeoff at Juan Santamaría International Airport. Nobody was killed.
- 15 January 1990 – **SANSA Flight 32**, a CASA C212, crashed into a mountain in Costa Rica after takeoff from Juan Santamaría International Airport in San José, killing all 23 on board.
- 31 December 2017 – Nature Air Flight 144, a Cessna 208 Caravan, stalled and crashed at Punta Islita, killing all 12 on board.
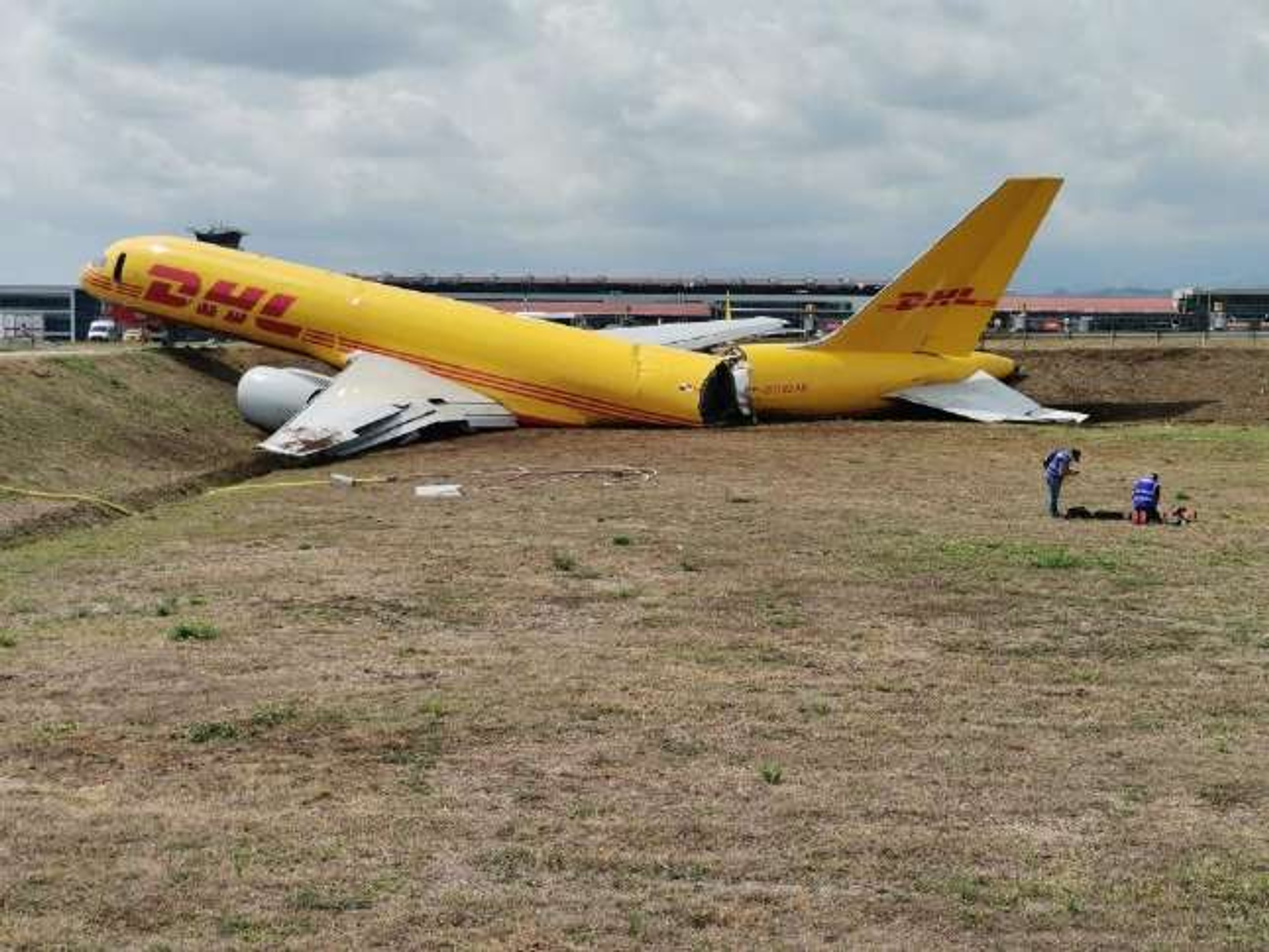
  The wreckage of DHL Flight 7216
- 7 April 2022 – DHL de Guatemala Flight 7216, a Boeing 757, suffered a hydraulic failure and ran off the runway at Juan Santamaría International Airport. Neither pilot was harmed

=== Cuba ===
- 10–12 November 1972 – Southern Airways Flight 49, a DC-9, was hijacked and flown to various places across the United States and Canada before eventually being flown to Havana, where the hijackers were captured. The aircraft and occupants were returned to the US by Cuba, and no fatalities occurred.
- 27 May 1977 – Aeroflot Flight 331, an Ilyushin Il-62, was on approach to José Martí International Airport when it clipped power lines and crashed into the ground. Of the 67 people aboard 2 survived. Pilot error was blamed.
- 3 September 1989 – **Cubana de Aviación Flight 9046**, an Ilyushin Il-62M, crashed shortly after takeoff from José Martí International Airport in bad weather. The aircraft crashed into a residential area. 126 people on board and 24 people on the ground, were killed.
- 18 August 1993 – American International Airways Flight 808, a DC-8, stalled and crashed during a deep bank on approach to Leeward Point Field at Guantánamo Bay. The 3 pilots survived.
- 6 March 2005 – Air Transat Flight 961, an Airbus A310, experienced a rudder detachment in flight. The aircraft successfully returned to Varadero.
- 4 November 2010 – Aero Caribbean Flight 883, an ATR-72, stalled and crashed in the Cuban provinces of Sancti Spiritus. All 68 people on board were killed.
- 18 May 2018 – Cubana de Aviación Flight 972, a Boeing 737-201 Advanced operated by Global Air, was carrying 113 passengers and crew. While taking off from Havana's José Martí International Airport, the plane suddenly banked to the left, stalled, and nose-dived. It then crashed onto a railway and exploded, killing 110 people. 2 survivors later succumbed to their injuries.

=== Dominican Republic ===
- 16 August 1957 – Varig Flight 850, a Lockheed Super Constellation, ditched in the Atlantic Ocean after takeoff from Santo Domingo following damage to 3 engines. A flight attendant was killed.
- 15 February 1970 – Dominicana de Aviación Flight 603, a McDonnell Douglas DC-9, suffered a dual engine failure due to fuel contamination, and crashed off the Dominican coast, killing all 102 on board.

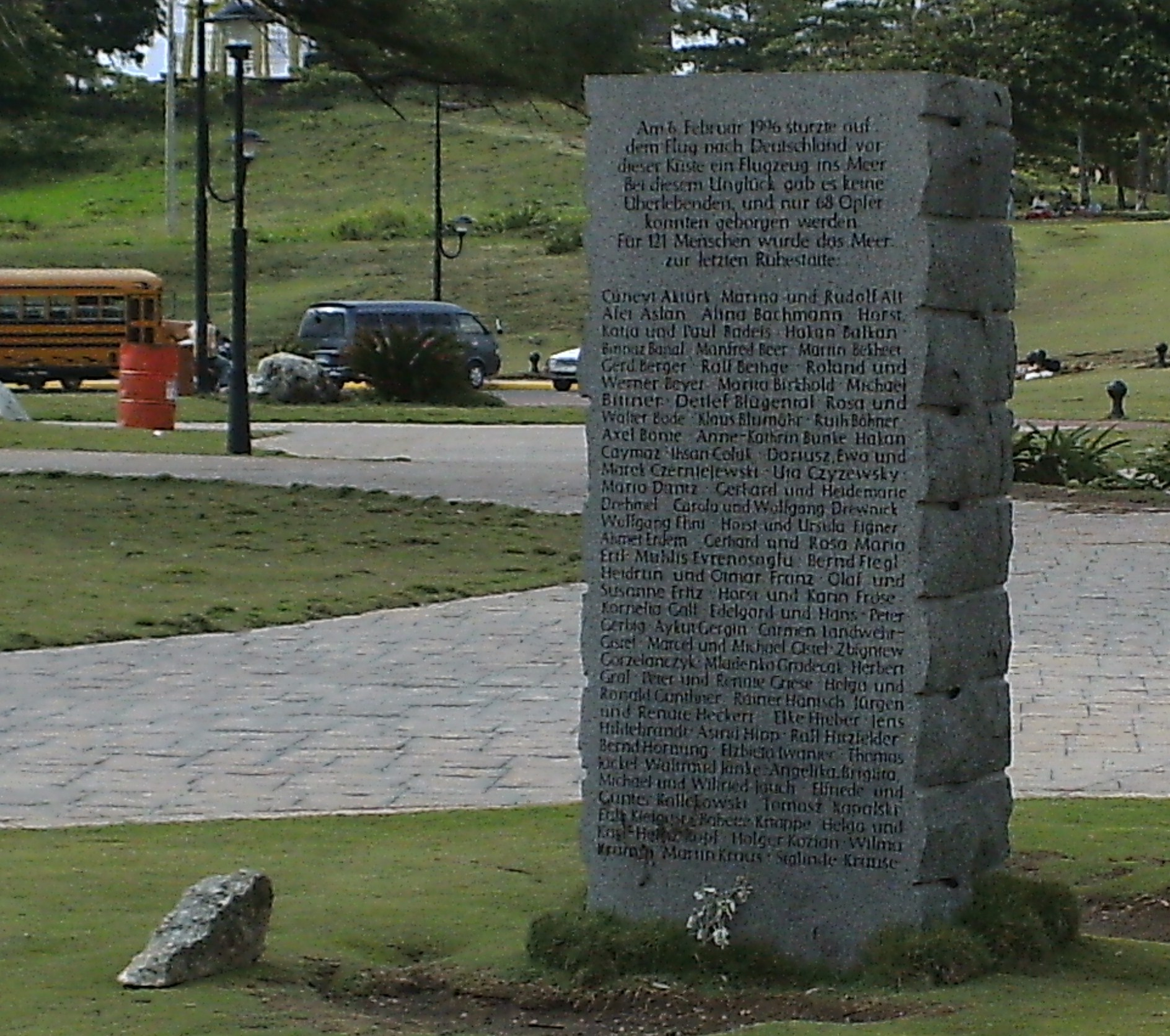
A memorial for the victims of Birgenair Flight 301

- 6 February 1996 – **Birgenair Flight 301**, a Boeing 757, stalled and crashed into the Atlantic Ocean off the Dominican coast, killing all 189 on board. The pitot tube was blocked, causing faulty airspeed readings, which the pilots reacted incorrectly to.

=== Guadeloupe ===
- 22 June 1962 – **Air France Flight 117**, a Boeing 707, crashed northwest of Pointe-à-Pitre, killing all 113 on board.
- 6 March 1968 – Air France Flight 212, a Boeing 707, crashed into La Grande Soufrière, killing all 63 on board.

=== Guatemala ===
- 27 April 1977 – a Convair 240 of Aviateca suffered engine failure shortly after takeoff from La Aurora International Airport in Guatemala City, and crashed after attempting an emergency landing, killing all 28 on board.
- 18 January 1986 – a Sud Aviation SE-210 Caravelle III of Aerovías **crashed into a hill** on approach to Santa Elena Airport, Flores after a short flight from Guatemala City's La Aurora International Airport. All 93 passengers and crew on board were killed, making it the worst air disaster in Guatemalan history.
- 21 December 1999 – Cubana de Aviación Flight 1216, a DC-10, overran the runway of La Aurora International Airport on 21 December 1999, ran down a slope and crashed into a residential area of Guatemala City, killing 16 on board and 2 on the ground.
- 24 August 2008 – a Cessna Caravan operated by Aéreo Ruta Maya crashed near Zacapa, killing 11 of the 14 on board.

=== Haiti ===
- 7 December 1995 – an Air Saint Martin Beechcraft 1900D crashed into a mountain after being cleared by air traffic control to descend, killing all 20 on board.
- 24 August 2003 – **Tropical Airways Flight 1301**, a Let L-410 Turbolet, was taking off from Hugo Chávez International Airport when its cargo door flipped open. The crew attempted an emergency landing, but the plane stalled and crashed into a sugar cane field, killing all 21 on board.

=== Honduras ===
Wreckage of Tan-Sahsa Flight 414

- 21 October 1989 – **Tan-Sahsa Flight 414**, a Boeing 727-200 with 146 people on board, crashed into a hill on approach to Toncontín International Airport in Tegucigalpa on 21 October 1989. 131 people died, making it the worst air crash in Central American history.
- 14 February 2011 – Central American Airways Flight 731, a Let L-410 Turbolet, crashed on approach to Toncontín International Airport, killing all 14 on board.
- 30 May 2008 – TACA Flight 390, an Airbus A320, overran the runway of Toncontín International Airport on 30 May 2008, and crashed into an embankment, smashing several cars and killing 5.
- 17 March 2025 – Aerolínea Lanhsa Flight 018, a Jetstream 32, suffered a runway excursion following an engine failure on takeoff, killing 13 of the 18 on board.

=== Jamaica ===
- 21 January 1960 – **Avianca Flight 671**, a Lockheed L-1049E Super Constellation, was landing on Montego Bay's Sangster International Airport. The plane touched the runway hard enough to bounce it back to the air. It touched the runway again and skidded. The plane then burst into flames. 37 people were killed.
- 19 April 2009 – CanJet Flight 918, a 737, was hijacked before takeoff at Sangster International Airport, Montego Bay. No casualties occurred.
- 22 December 2009 – American Airlines Flight 331, a Boeing 737-823, was landing on Kingston's Norman Manley International Airport when it overran the runway, flew into the rocky beach, crashed, and broke apart. 85 people were injured, no one was killed.

=== Panama ===
- 6 June 1992 – **Copa Airlines Flight 201**, while traveling above the Darién Gap, the Boeing 737 rolled to the right, turned over, and suddenly disintegrate in mid-air. It then exploded and crashed into the dense Panamanian forest, killing all 47 people on board.
- 19 July 1994 – Alas Chiricanas Flight 901, an Embraer E110, suffered an in-flight explosion caused by a bomb. There were 21 deaths and 0 survivors.

=== Saint Barthélemy ===
- 24 March 2001 – **Air Caraïbes Flight 1501**, a Twin Otter, crashed into a house on approach to Gustaf III Airport, killing all 19 on board and one on the ground.

=== Saint Vincent and the Grenadines ===
- 3 August 1986 – **LIAT Flight 319**, a Twin Otter, disappeared with 13 people on board. It was presumed to have crashed into the Caribbean Sea near E. T. Joshua Airport.

=== Trinidad and Tobago ===
- 8 January 1945 – **Pan Am Flight 161**, a Martin M-130, crashed on approach to Port of Spain Airport, killing 23 of the 30 on board.

== Europe ==
=== Austria ===
- 29 February 1964 – **British Eagle International Airlines Flight 802/6**, a Bristol Britannia, crashed into the Glungezer mountain near Innsbruck, killing all 83 people on board.
- 12 July 2000 – Hapag-Lloyd Flight 3378, an Airbus A300, crash-landed 650 m short of the runway in Vienna due to fuel exhaustion 22 km out, arising from erroneous fuel management combined with a failure to divert. There were no serious injuries.
- 23 December 2024 – Swiss International Air Lines Flight 1885, an Airbus A220, made an emergency landing at Graz Airport after smoke entered the cabin. All passengers were safely evacuated, but a flight attendant died in hospital a week later.

=== Belarus ===
- 15 January 1979 – Aeroflot Flight 7502, an Antonov An-24, stalled and crashed on approach to Minsk-1 Airport due to icing. 13 of the 14 people on board were killed.
- 28 June 1982 – **Aeroflot Flight 8641**, a Yakovlev Yak-42, suffered a jackscrew failure, causing the aircraft to lose control, disintegrate in mid-air, and crashed near Mozyr. All 132 people on board were killed.
- 1 February 1985 – Aeroflot Flight 7841, a Tu-134, suffered double engine failure due to ice ingestion shortly after taking off. To maintain speed, the captain descended onto a forest. The plane clipped some trees and crashed, killing 58 people.
- 23 May 2021 – Ryanair Flight 4978, a 737 operated by Buzz, was forcibly diverted to Minsk National Airport by the Belarusian government following a false bomb threat. On the ground, activist Roman Protasevich and his partner Sofia Sapega were arrested.

=== Belgium ===
- 28 March 1933 – An Imperial Airways Argosy crashes near Diksmuide following an onboard fire suspected to be the first case of aerial sabotage. All 12 passengers and 3 crew were killed.
- 30 December 1933 – An Avro Ten operated by Imperial Airways crashes on a radio mast of Belradio at Ruysselede killing all 8 passengers and 2 crew.
- 16 November 1937 – Sabena OO-AUB, a Junkers Ju 52 crashed while attempting to land in bad weather near Ostend. All 11 aboard are killed.
- 1 July 1948 – a Fiat G.212 operated by Linee Aeree Italiane crashed during an emergency landing at Keerbergen, killing 8 of the 12 on board.
- 15 February 1961 – **Sabena Flight 548**, a Boeing 707, crashed due to mechanical failure while attempting to land in Brussels. All 72 passengers and crew were killed, along with a single ground casualty.
- 2 October 1971 – British European Airways Flight 706, a Vickers Vanguard, suffers a rear pressure bulkhead failure due to corrosion causing the tailplane to detach. It nose-dived into a farmland killing all 55 passengers and 8 crew and minorly injuring 1 person on the ground.
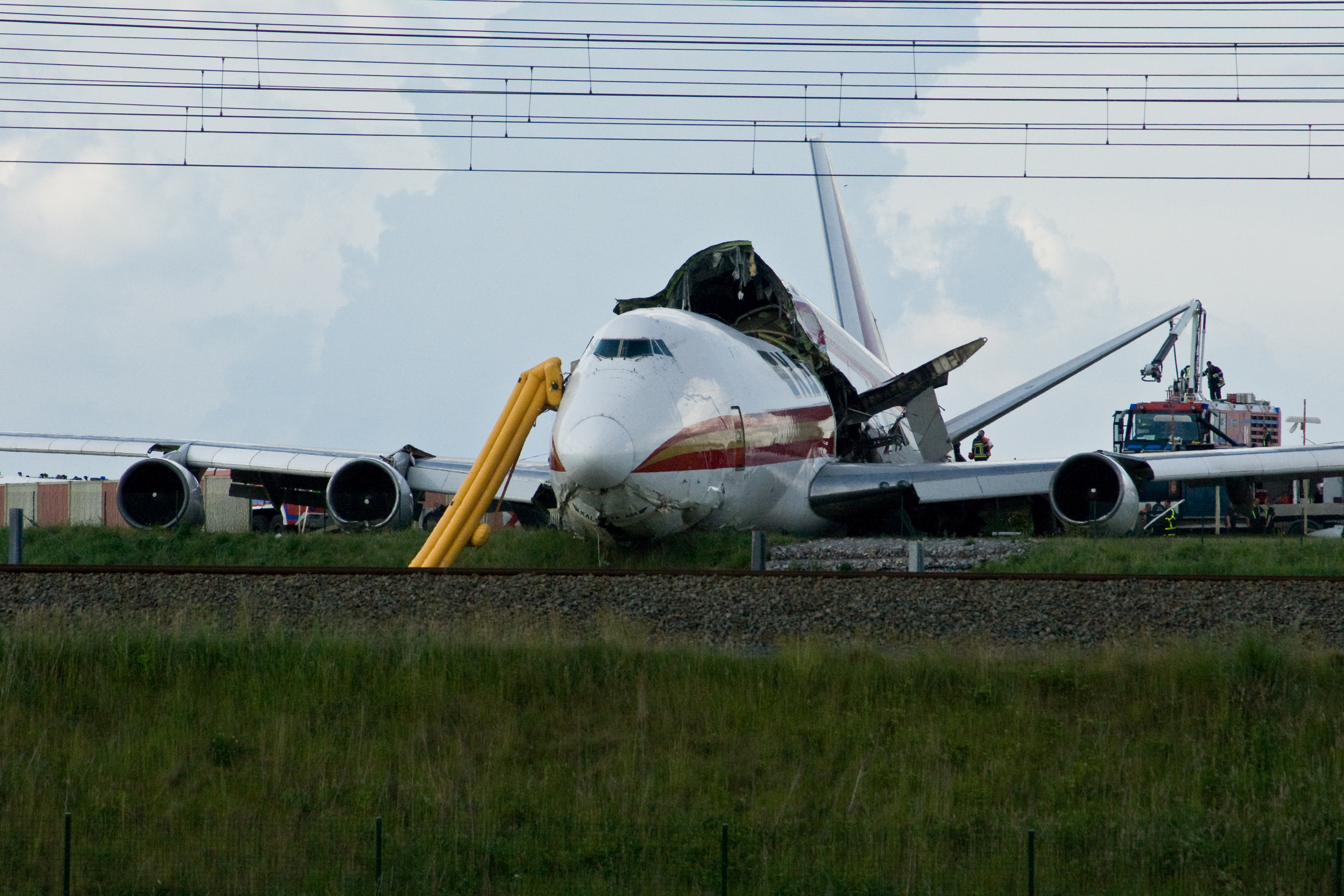
  Kalitta Air Flight 207
- 25 May 2008 – Kalitta Air Flight 207 suffers a bird strike on take-off from Brussels Airport and overruns the runway. Everyone survives.

=== Bulgaria ===
- 27 July 1955 – El Al Flight 402, a Lockheed Constellation, was shot down by Bulgarian jets after it went astray onto Bulgarian airspace. All 58 on board Flight 402 was killed.
- 16 March 1978 – a **Balkan Bulgarian Airlines Flight 107**, a Tu-134, crashed near the village of Gabare. All 73 on people on board died.
- 7 March 1983 – Balkan Bulgarian Airlines Flight 013, an Antonov An-24, was hijacked by 4 men who demanded to be flown to Vienna. The crew landed at Varna Airport after misleading the hijackers that they were landing at Vienna, where the aircraft was stormed and one hijacker was killed.
- 10 January 1984 – a Balkan Bulgarian Airlines Tupolev Tu-134 crashed on approach to Sofia Airport. All 50 people on board died.
- 3 September 1996 – Hemus Air Flight 7081, a Tupolev Tu-154, was hijacked. The plane landed safely without injuries.

=== Croatia ===
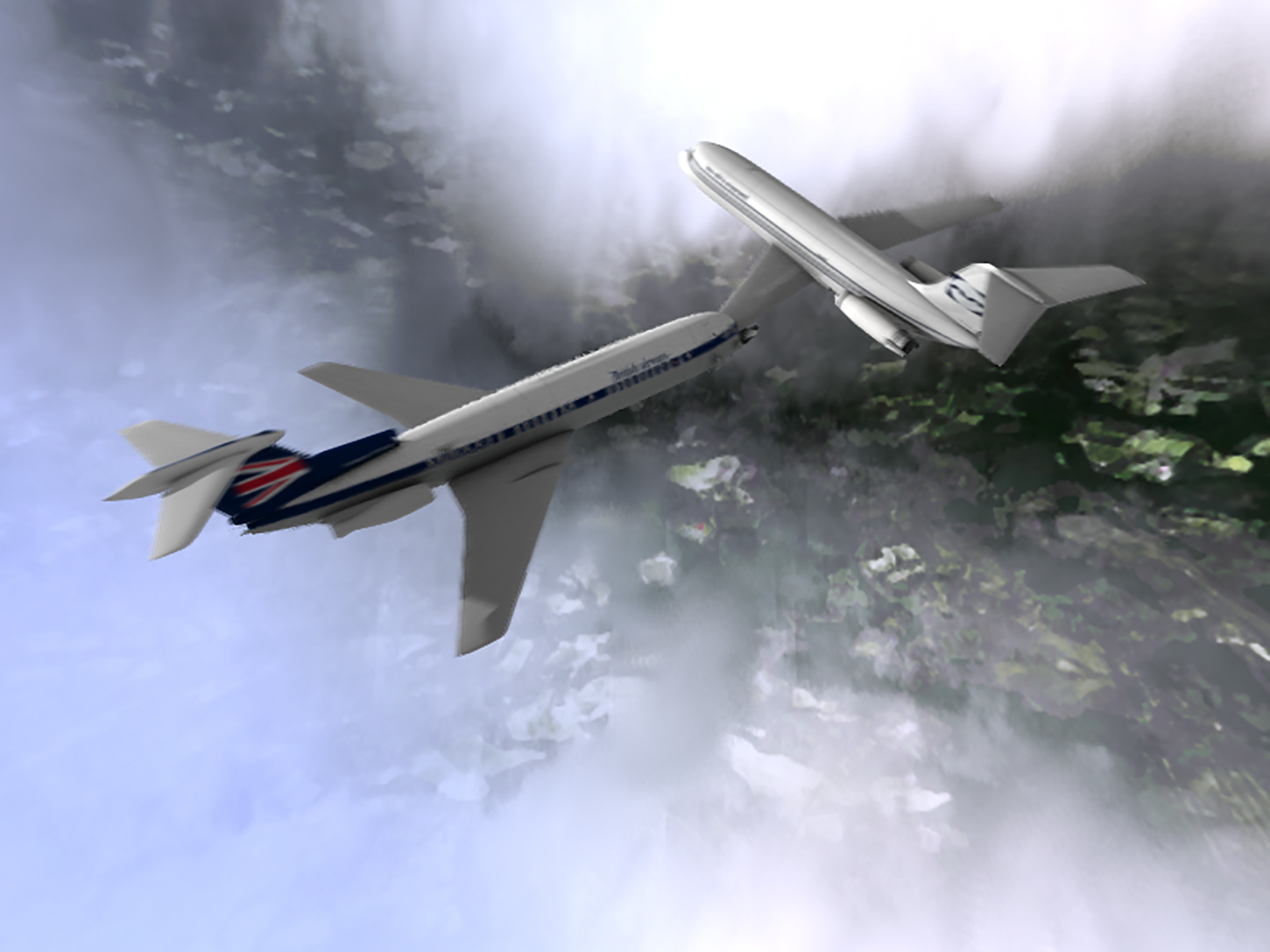
A CGI image depicting the Zagreb mid-air collision

- 23 May 1971 – Aviogenex Flight 130, a Tu-134, as the aircraft was approaching Rijeka Airport, entered into a gradually steeping angle of descent. Due to an optical illusion, the crew thought they were closer to the runway and at a greater altitude than the actual one. The plane then crashed and turned over. The ensuing fire kills 78 people on board.
- 10 September 1976 – the **Zagreb mid-air collision** occurred when British Airways Flight 476, a Hawker Siddeley Trident, collided in mid-air with Inex-Adria Flight 550, a DC-9, near Zagreb. All 176 people on board both aircraft were killed and another on the ground.

=== Cyprus ===
- 20 April 1967 – 1967 Nicosia Britannia disaster: a Globe Air charter flight, operated with a Bristol Britannia 313 flew into high ground near Nicosia, Cyprus. 126 people were killed.
- 29 January 1973 – EgyptAir Flight 741, an Ilyushin Il-18D, crashes into the Kyrenia Mountains on approach on 29 January 1971. All 30 passengers and 7 crew died.
- 27 February 1988 – Talia Airways Flight 2H79, a Boeing 727-200, crashed into a mountain, killing all 15 occupants.
- 29 March 2016 – EgyptAir Flight 181, an Airbus A320-233, is hijacked and flown to Larnaca International Airport. The hijacker surrendered after 7 hours.

=== Czech Republic ===
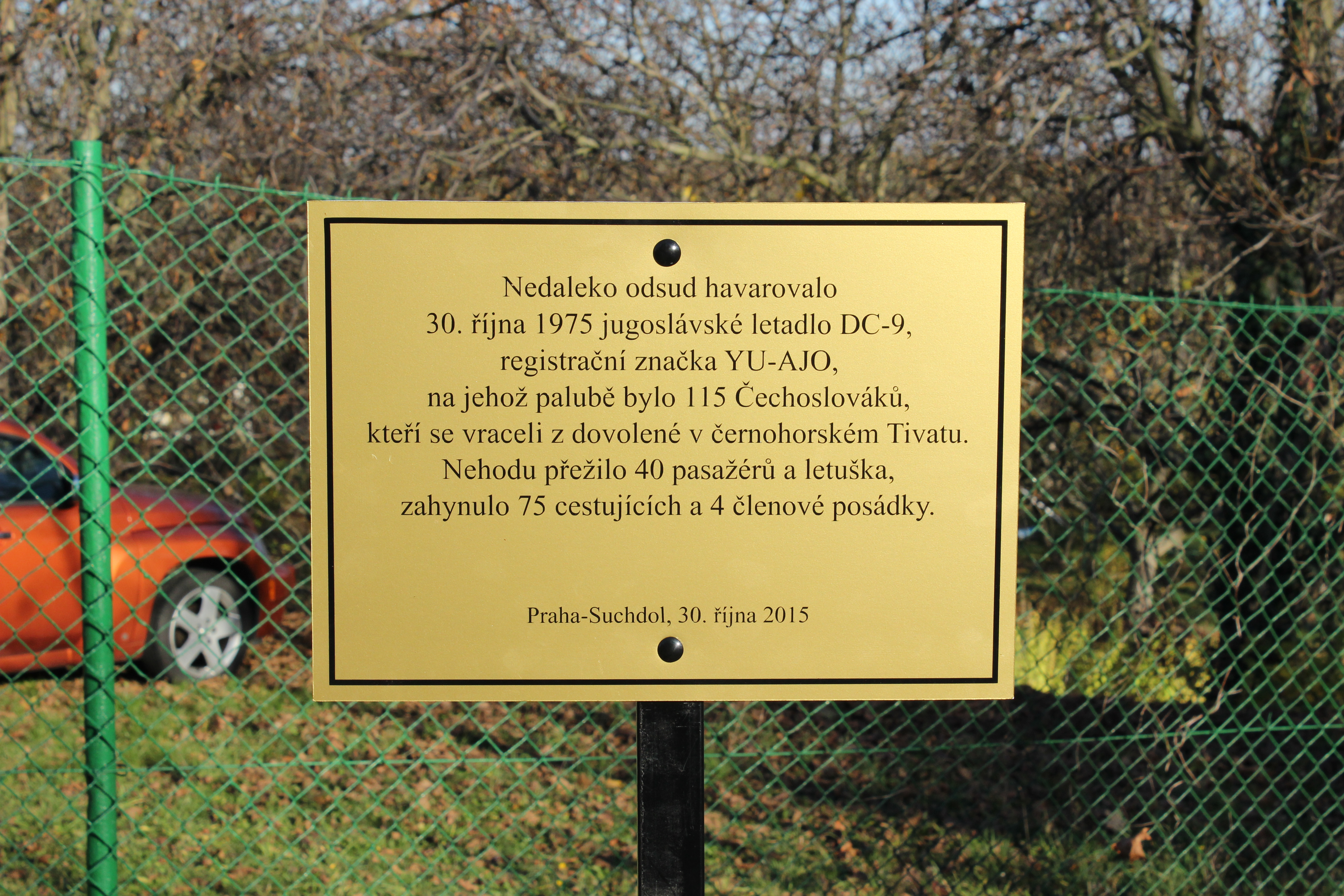
A memorial plaque for the 75 people that perished in Inex-Adria Aviopromet Flight 450

- 26 January 1972 – JAT Flight 367, a DC-9, was bombed and crashed in Srbská Kamenice, Czechoslovakia (now Czech Republic). 27 were killed. The sole survivor, crew member Vesna Vulović, holds the Guinness world record for surviving the highest fall without a parachute at 10,160 m (33,330 ft).
- 19 February 1973 – Aeroflot Flight 141, a Tupolev Tu-154, impacted ground and burst into flames while on approach to Prague Ruzyně Airport. 66 people were killed.
- 30 October 1975 – **Inex-Adria Aviopromet Flight 450**, a DC-9, impacted the ground during final approach in foggy weather Prague, killing 79 people.
- 17 November 1990 – an Aeroflot Tupolev Tu-154 made a forced landing in a field near Dubenec due to an in-flight fire. All 6 crew members survived.

=== Denmark ===
- 26 January 1947 – Douglas Dakota, PH-TCR of KLM crashed after takeoff from Kastrup airport in Copenhagen, killing all 22 on board, including Prince Gustaf Adolf of Sweden.
- 16 July 1960 – A de Havilland Dragon Rapide operated by Zonens Redningskorps loses control and crashes 50 meters from the shore killing all 8 passengers. Only the pilot survived.
- 28 August 1971 – Malév Flight 731, an Ilyushin Il-18, crashes into the Baltic Sea on approach to Copenhagen Airport killing 31.
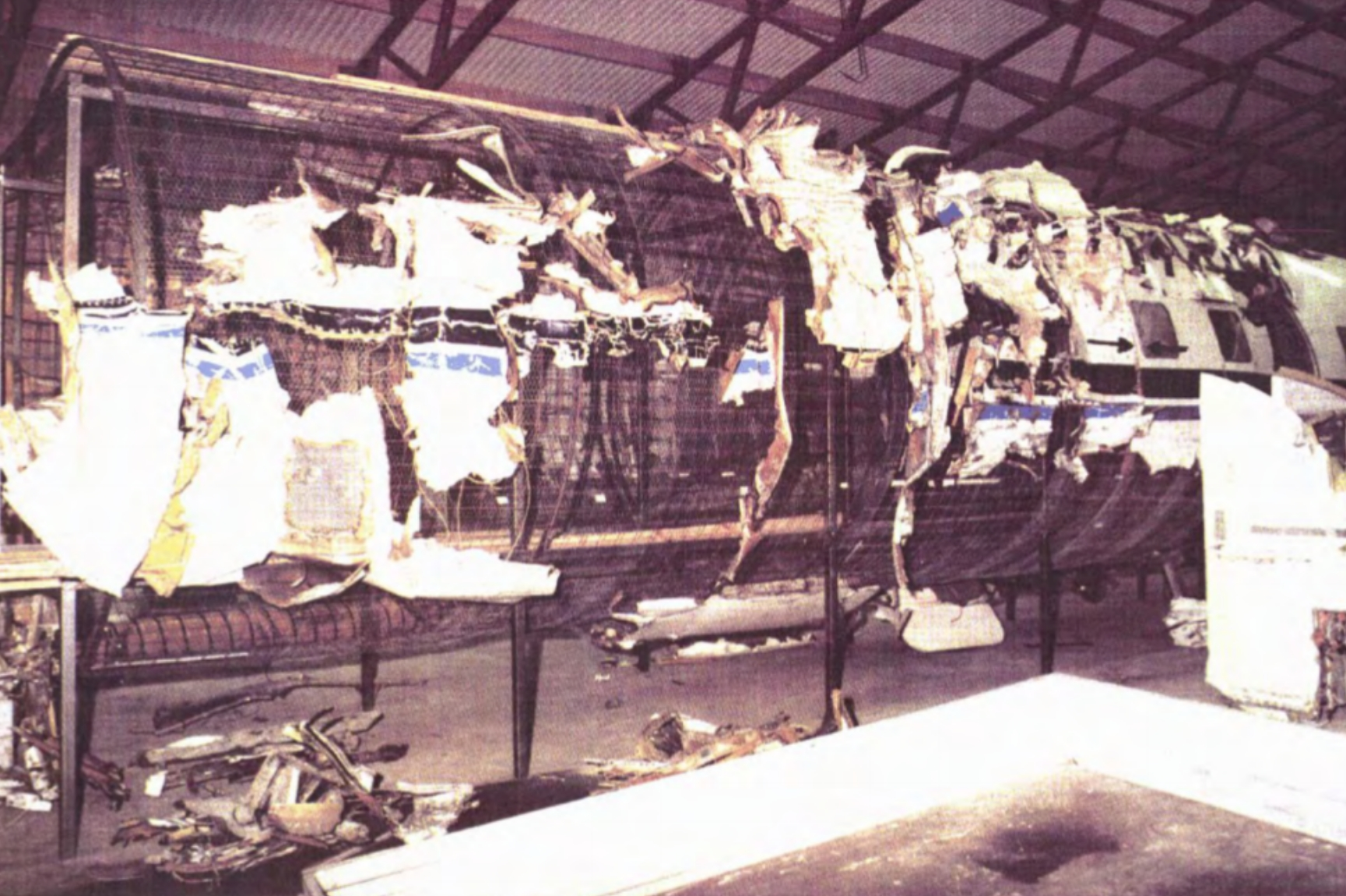
  Wreckage of Partnair Flight 394 being reconstructed
- 8 September 1989 – **Partnair Flight 394**, a Convair CV-580, suffers a rudder hardover due to counterfeit parts and breaks up over the sea, killing all 55 on board.
- 9 September 2007 – Scandinavian Airlines Flight 1209, a Bombardier Dash 8 Q400 operated Scandinavian Airlines suffers a right gear collapse on landing at Aalborg Airport. 5 people are injured.
- 27 October 2007 – Scandinavian Airlines Flight 2867, a Bombardier Dash 8 Q400 operated by Scandinavian Airlines suffers a right gear collapse on landing at Copenhagen Airport. There are no injuries.

=== Estonia ===
- 14 June 1940 – Aero Flight 1631, a Junkers Ju 52, was shot down over the Baltic Sea off the coast of Estonia, killing all 9 on board.
- 5 September 1958 – Aeroflot Flight 365, an Avia 14P, was hijacked and made an emergency landing at Jõhvi. On approach, the hijacker detonated explosives, causing a fire. The aircraft landed at Jõhvi, and all occupants escaped the aircraft except for the hijacker, who died in the fire.
- 23 November 2001 – **ELK Airways Flight 1007**, an Antonov An-28 operated by Enimex, crashed on approach to Kärdla Airport, killing 14.
- 10 August 2005 – **Copterline Flight 103**, a Sikorsky S-76, crashed into the Tallinn Bay, killing all 14 on board.

=== Faroe Islands ===
- 26 September 1970 – **Flugfélag Íslands Flight 704**, a Fokker F27, crashed in Mykines, killing 8.

=== Finland ===
- 14 June 1940 – Aero Flight 1631, a Junkers Ju 52 operated by Aero O/Y is shot down by two Soviet Ilyushin DB-3 bombers. All 7 passengers and 2 crew are killed.
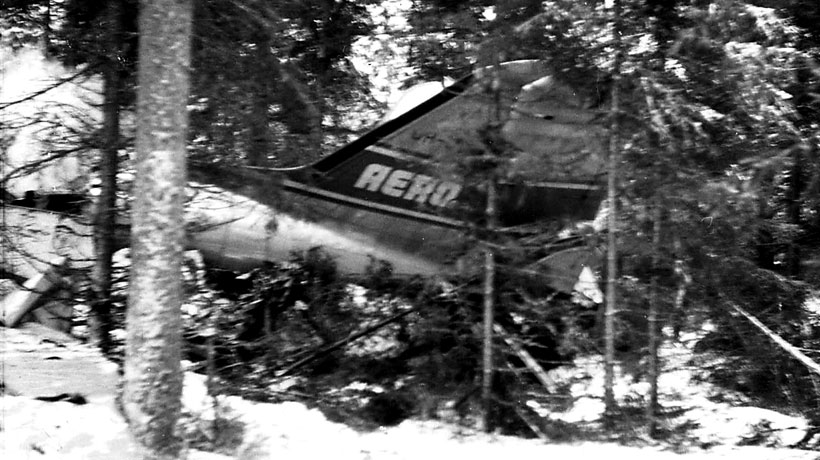
  Aero Flight 311
- 3 January 1961 – **Aero Flight 311**, a Douglas DC-3, entered a spin during approach and crashed into the woods, killing all 25 people on board.
- 8 November 1963 – Aero Flight 217, a Douglas DC-3, crashed into the ground while trying to land at Mariehamn Airport. The plane came to rest upside down and caught fire, killing 22 people.
- 10 July 1977 – an Aeroflot Tu-134 was hijacked and flown to Helsinki. The hijackers held hostages on the ground, who escaped when the hijackers were sleeping.
- 30 September 1978 – Finnair Flight 405, a Sud Aviation Caravelle, was hijacked and ferried between Helsinki, Oulu and Amsterdam, releasing passengers for ransom demands. The final hostages were released at Oulu Airport, and the hijacker returned home, where he was arrested.

=== France ===
- 26 August 1921 – a Farman Goliath of SNETA ditched off the coast of France. The two pilots were never found.
- 7 April 1922 – the Picardie mid-air collision occurred when a Farman F.60 Goliath operated by Compagnie des Grands Express Aériens collided with a de Havilland DH.18A operated by Daimler Hire Limited. All 3 passengers and 2 crew on the Goliath and 2 crew on the DH.18A die.
- 14 May 1923 – A Farman F.60 Goliath operated by Air Union broke up killing all 4 passengers and 2 crew.
- 25 June 1925 – a KLM Fokker F.III crashed in Forêt de Mormal, killing all 4 on board.
- 1 June 1943 – BOAC Flight 777-A, a Douglas DC-3-194 operated by KLM is shot down by 8 Junkers Ju 88 fighters over the Bay of Biscay. All 13 passengers and 4 crew died.
- 18 December 1949 – A Douglas DC-3 operated by Sabena crashes after suffering a structural failure of a wing, killing all 8 on board.
- 3 November 1950 – Air India Flight 245 crashes into Mont Blanc killing all 48 on board.
- 13 November 1950 – A Douglas C-54 operated by Curtiss-Reid Flying Service crashes into a mountain killing all 58 on board.
- 3 March 1952 – A SNCASE SE.161 Languedoc operated by Air France loses control and crashes due to jammed ailerons. All 34 passengers and 4 crew died.
- 1 September 1953 – Air France Flight 178, a Lockheed L-749 Constellation crashes in the French Alps killing all 42 on board.
- 24 November 1956 – Linee Aeree Italiane Flight 451, a DC-6, lost control and crashed in Paray-Vieille-Poste, killing 34 of the 35 on board.
- 24 September 1959 – TAI Flight 307, a Douglas DC-7C operated by Transports Aériens Intercontinentaux crashes in a pine forest. Of the 56 passengers and 9 crew, only 11 survive with serious injuries.
- 7 October 1961 – A Derby Aviation C-47 crashes into Canigou mountainside en route to Perpignan, killing all 34 aboard.
- 3 June 1962 – Air France Flight 007, a chartered Boeing 707 crashes on takeoff from Orly due to a mechanical failure. 130 people die.
- 22 June 1962 – Air France Flight 117 crashes into a hill in Pointe-à-Pitre, Guadeloupe, killing all 113 on board.
- 23 November 1962 – Malév Flight 355, an Ilyushin Il-18, stalled crashed on approach to Paris–Le Bourget Airport, killing all 21 on board.
- 29 December 1962 – a Boeing 307 operated by Air Nautic crashed into Monte Renoso on Corsica, killing all 25 on board.
- 12 September 1963 – an Air Nautic Vickers VC.1 Viking crashed at Py, killing all 40 on board.
- 24 January 1966 – Air India Flight 101, a Boeing 707-437 operated by Air India hits Mont Blanc. All 106 passengers and 11 crew die.
- 3 June 1967 – A Douglas DC-4 operated by Air Ferry crashes into Mount Canigou after the crew becomes poisoned with carbon monoxide. All 88 on board die.
- 3 December 1971 – Pakistan International Airlines Flight 712, a Boeing 720, was hijacked on the ground at Orly Airport. The hijacker was arrested after a 7-hour standoff and no one was hurt.
- 27 October 1972 – Air Inter Flight 696Y crashes in the La Faye Forest killing 60.
- 5 March 1973 – the 1973 Nantes mid-air collision occurred when Iberia Flight 504, a McDonnell Douglas DC-9-32 and Spantax Flight 400, a Convair 990 Coronado, collide due to ATC error. All 61 passengers and 7 crew on the DC-9 die while the Convair 990 lands safely without deaths.
- 3 June 1973 – A Tupolev Tu-144 breaks up during the Paris Air Show, killing all 6 crew and 8 people on the ground.
- 11 July 1973 – Varig Flight 820 lands in a field near Orly, France, because of a lavatory fire killing 123.
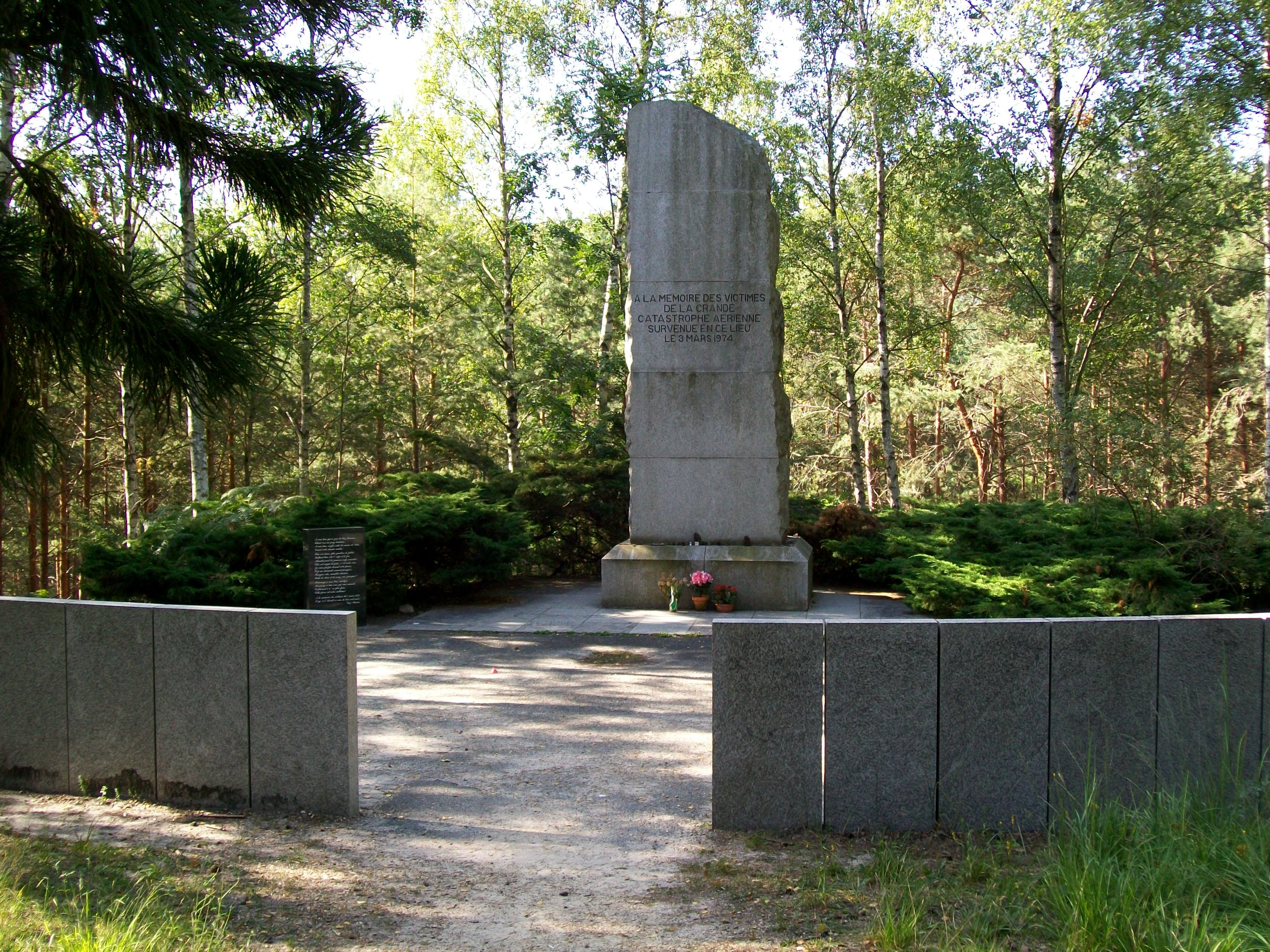
  Memorial to the victims of Turkish Airlines Flight 981
- 3 March 1974 – **Turkish Airlines Flight 981** was a DC-10 flying from Paris Charles de Gaulle International Airport. Just after take-off, the cargo door suddenly was torn apart from the aircraft. The explosive decompression cut most of the aircraft's vital cables, leading to a loss of control. The aircraft crashed in Ermenonville Forest, killing all 346 on board. It remains the deadliest accident in France and the fourth deadliest worldwide.
- 1 December 1981 – Inex-Adria Aviopromet Flight 1308, an MD-82, crashed into Corsica's Mont San-Pietro, killing all 180 people on board.
- 21 December 1987 – Air France Flight 1919, an Embraer EMB 120 operated by Air Littoral, crashed near Eysines, killing all 16 on board.
- 4 March 1988 – TAT Flight 230, a Fairchild FH-227 operated by TAT European Airlines suffers an electrical malfunction and crashes. All 20 passengers and 3 crew died.
- 26 June 1988 – Air France Flight 296 crashes into a forest during a low-pass killing 3. It is the first Airbus A320 crash.
- 20 January 1992 – Air Inter Flight 148, an Airbus A320, crashed near Mont Sainte-Odile while it was circling to land at Strasbourg, killing 87.
- 31 March 1992 – Trans-Air Service Flight 671 suffers a double engine separation. A fire subsequently erupts on the wing. It lands at Istres-Le Tubé Air Base.
- 6 January 1993 – Lufthansa CityLine Flight 5634, a DHC-8 operated by Contact Air, was initiating a go-around when the plane suddenly entered a high sink rate. The aircraft crashed and split into two parts, killing 4 people.
- 30 June 1994 – Airbus Industrie Flight 129, an Airbus A330-321 operated by Airbus Industrie crashed during a test flight due to pilot error. All 4 passengers and 3 crew are killed.
- 24–26 December 1994 – Air France Flight 8969 is hijacked after takeoff from Algiers and taken back to France. 7 people are killed.
- 30 July 1998 – Proteus Airlines Flight 706, a Beechcraft 1900D operated by Proteus Airlines collides with a private Cessna 177RG Cardinal. All 12 passengers and 2 crew on the Beechcraft and the only pilot on the Cessna died.
- 25 May 2000 – the 2000 Charles de Gaulle runway collision occurred when Air Liberté Flight 8807, an MD-83, collided on takeoff with Streamline Aviation Flight 200, a Short 330. The first officer of the Short was killed. The MD-83 safely aborted takeoff.
- 25 July 2000 – Air France Flight 4590, a Concorde, was on its take-off roll when it ran over a metal strip left by a Continental Airlines DC-10. One of its tires burst and its pieces hit the fuel tank and ignited a fire. The Concorde stalled and crashed on a hotel in Gonesse, France. All 109 on board and 4 people in the hotel are killed.
- 22 June 2003 – Air France Flight 5672, a Bombardier CRJ100ER operated by Brit Air for Air France crashes on approach. Of the 21 passengers and 3 crew, the pilot dies and 9 people are injured (5 seriously).
- 15 September 2006 – EasyJet Flight 6074, an Airbus A319, suffered a major electrical failure over France, including radios, autopilot, the aircraft's transponder, and the TCAS. This led to a near miss with American Airlines Flight 63, as air traffic control could not communicate with the A319. Fearing the aircraft may be intercepted or shot down if they strayed off course, the EasyJet pilots continued their planned flight to Bristol and landed safely.
- 25 January 2007 – Air France Flight 7775, a Fokker 100 operated by Régional, stalled and crashed in icing conditions on takeoff from Pau Pyrénées Airport. No one on the aircraft was killed, but the landing gear struck the cabin of a truck, killing the driver.
- 27 November 2008 – XL Airways Germany Flight 888T, an Airbus A320-232 operated by XL Airways Germany stalls and crashes due to sensor malfunction. The aircraft was on an acceptance flight, where tests were carried out before it was returned to the aircraft's owner, Air New Zealand. All 5 passengers and 2 crew died.

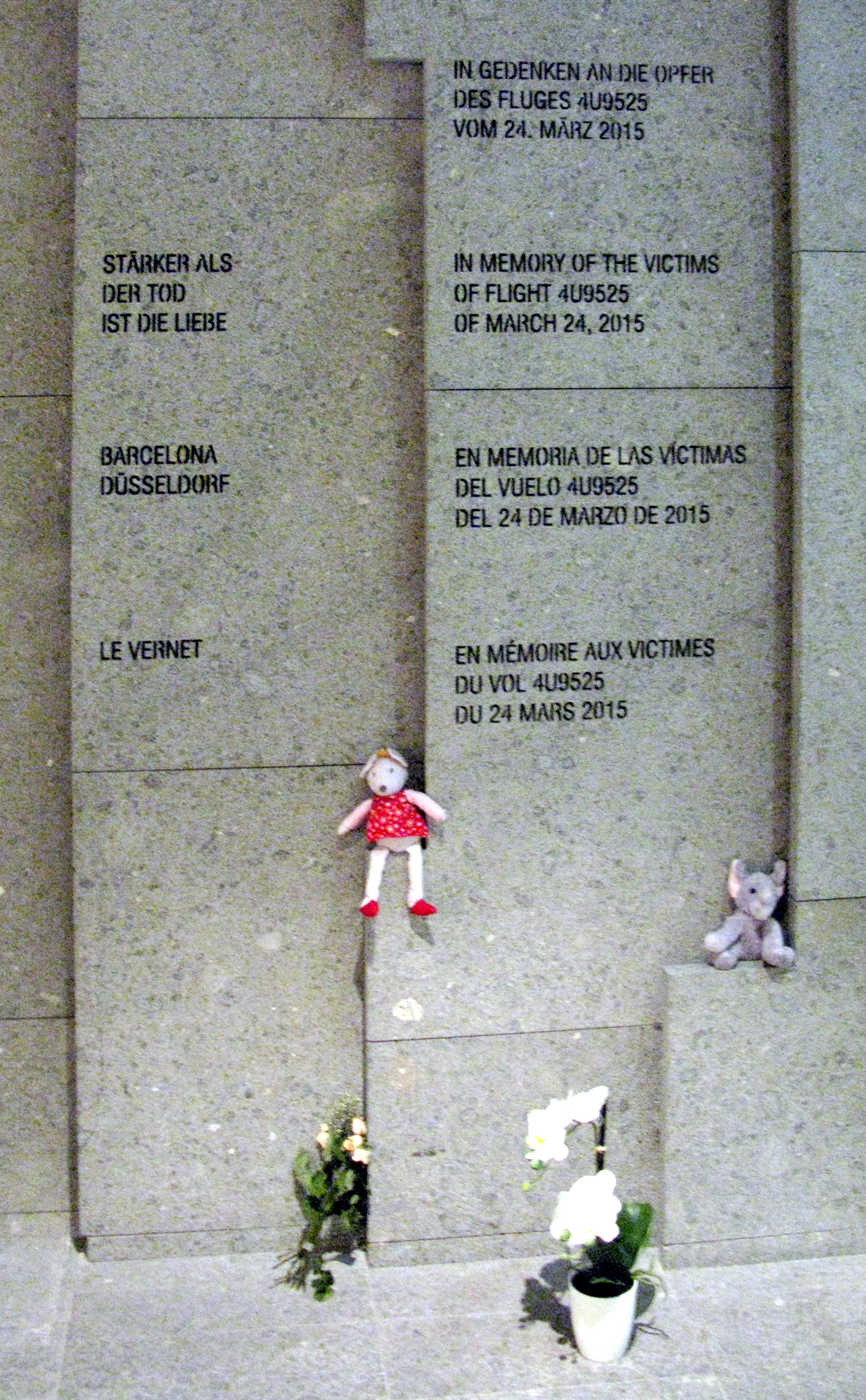
A memorial at Düsseldorf Airport to the victims of Germanwings Flight 9525

- 24 March 2015 – Germanwings Flight 9525 crashes near Digne-les-Bains in the French Alps en route to Düsseldorf Airport after the co-pilot locked the captain from the cockpit and deliberately crashed the plane into the Alps, killing all 150 people on board.

=== Germany ===
A newsreel footage of the Munich Air Disaster

- 27 July 1934 – the wing of Curtiss AT-32C Condor II operated by Swissair separated from the airplane while in adverse weather conditions at Tuttlingen. All 12 people on board were killed.
- 8 November 1940 – a Junkers Ju 90A-1 operated by Deutsche Luft Hansa lost control and crashed due to tail icing. All 23 passengers and 6 crew die.
- 5 April 1948 – the Gatow air disaster occurred when a British European Airways Vickers Viking 1B collided with a Soviet Air Force Yak-3 near RAF Gatow in Berlin, killing all 15 on both aircraft.
- 22 March 1952 – KLM Flight 592, a DC-6, crashed on approach to Frankfurt Airport, killing 45 people leaving 2 survivors.
- 14 October 1953 – a Convair CV-240 operated by Sabena crashed shortly after taking off from Frankfurt Airport, killing all 44 on board.
- 6 February 1958 – British European Flight 609, an Airspeed Ambassador carrying the Manchester United F.C., overran the runway at Munich Airport, killing 23.
- 28 March 1961 – ČSA Flight 511, an Ilyushin Il-18, was cruising above Germany when it disintegrated into pieces. The plane's wreckage fell from the sky and struck the ground below, killing all 52 people on board.
- 9 August 1968 – British Eagle Flight 802, a Vickers Viscount, lost control and crashed near Langenbruck after all electrical generators disconnected, killing all 48 on board.
- 6 September 1971 – Paninternational Flight 112, a BAC One-Eleven, suffered a dual engine failure. The aircraft then attempted an emergency landing on Bundesautobahn 7, but then collided with a bridge and burst into flames, killing 22 people on board.
- 28 January 1966 – Lufthansa Flight 005, a Convair CV-440, stalled and crashed during a go-around, killing all 46 people on board, including seven Italian team swimmers of the Olympic team.
- 15 November 1966 – Pan Am Flight 708, a Boeing 727-21, crashes on approach on 15 November 1966. All 3 crew members die.
- 14 August 1972 – **Interflug Flight 450**, an Ilyushin Il-62, suffered an in-flight fire. While attempting an emergency landing at Berlin Schönefeld Airport, the aircraft broke up in mid-air and crashed, killing all 156 on board.
- 1 September 1975 – Interflug Flight 1107, a Tupolev Tu-134, was on approach to Leipzig/Halle Airport when it struck a radio mast and crashed, killing 27 people.
- 12 December 1986 – Aeroflot Flight 892, a Tu-134, was on approach to Schonefeld Airport. Due to a language misunderstanding, the Tu-134A landed on a closed runway. It took off again, but then stalled and burst into flames. 72 people died.
- 8 February 1988 – Nürnberger Flugdienst Flight 108, a Swearingen Metro, was struck by lightning and lost control. The aircraft crashed and exploded, killing everyone on board.
- 1 July 2002 – the Überlingen mid-air collision occurred when BAL Flight 2937, a Tupolev Tu-154 carrying 69 people, 45 of whom were children, collided with DHL Flight 611, a Boeing 757, over the city of Überlingen. All 71 people on board both aircraft killed.
- 10 July 2002 – Swiss International Air Lines Flight 850, a Saab 2000, hits an earth embankment on landing at Werneuchen. Of the 16 passengers and 4 crew, 1 passenger suffers minor injuries.
- 19 June 2010 – A Douglas C-47 Skytrain operated by Air Service Berlin crashed in a field due to a left engine failure. Of the 25 passengers and 3 crew, 7 people were injured.
- 5 August 2026 – European Air Transport Leipzig Flight 9LE, a Boeing 757 operating for DHL Aviation, collided with an unmanned aerial vehicle on a go-around from Leipzig/Halle Airport, which had just closed due to the presence of drones. The aircraft diverted to Hannover Airport safely.

=== Greece ===
- 8 December 1969 – Olympic Airways Flight 954, a Douglas DC-6 (SX-DAE), crashed during its approach to Athens Ellinikon Airport from Chania on Paneio mountain near Keratea amidst bad weather killing 90 passengers and crew. This was the worst aircraft accident in Greece until 2005.
- 22 July 1970 – Olympic Airways Flight 255, a Boeing 727, was hijacked over Rhodes. No casualties occurred.
- 21 October 1972 – Olympic Airways Flight 506, a NAMC YS-11, crashed into the sea off the coast of Voula, killing 37.
- 8 September 1974 – TWA Flight 841, a Boeing 707-331B (N8734), crashed in the Ionian sea 30 minutes after its departure from Athens. An explosive device in the luggage area destroyed flight controls and resulted in 88 deaths.
- 23 November 1976 – Olympic Airways Flight 830, a NAMC YS-11A, hit a mountain near the village of Servia. All 50 on board died.
- 9 August 1978 – Olympic Airways Flight 411, a Boeing 747, suffered loss of speed on takeoff from Athens Ellinikon Airport due to engine failure and pilot error. The aircraft narrowly avoided crashing into residential Athens, and was able to safely return to Ellinikon.
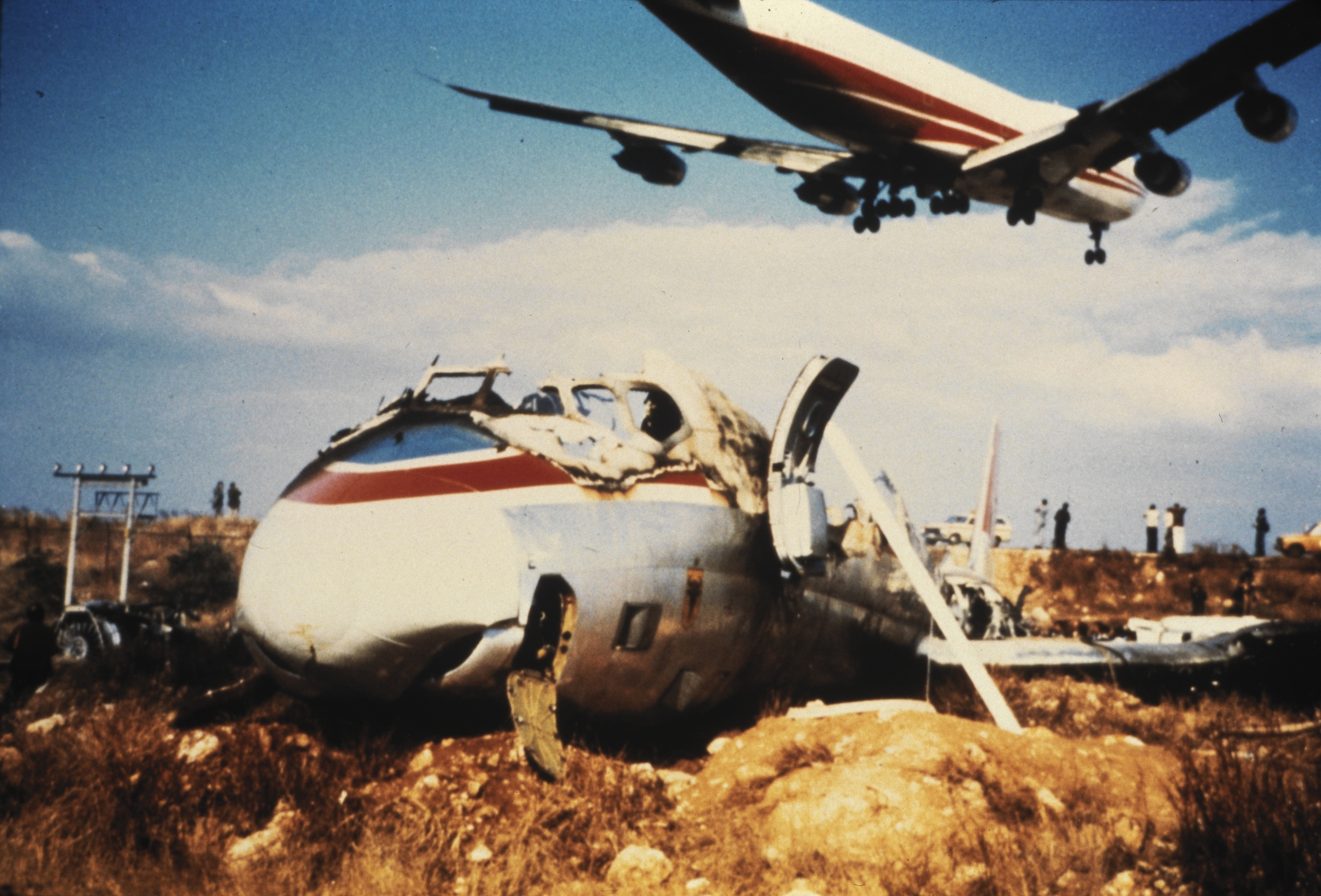
  Swissair Flight 316
- 8 October 1979 – Swissair Flight 316, a Douglas DC-8 (HB-IDE), landed near the middle of runway 15L of Athens Ellinikon Airport at more than 270 km/h overrun the runway and stopped on a public road outside the airport area. Its left-wing was severed from the fuselage and in the resulting fire 14 out of 154 passengers died.
- 14 June 1985 – TWA Flight 847, a Boeing 727-231 operated by Trans World Airlines, was hijacked. 1 passenger dies.
- 2 April 1986 – TWA Flight 840, a Boeing 727, was bombed over Argos, Greece, sucking out 4 on board – the plane landed safely.
- 3 August 1989 – Olympic Aviation Flight 545, a Shorts 330-200 (SX-BGE), crashed on Kerkis mountain coming from Thessaloniki towards airport Pythagoras in Samos. All 31 passengers and crew of 3 died.
- 17 December 1997 – Aerosvit Flight 241, a Yakovlev Yak-42, crashed into the Pieria Mountains due to pilot error. All 70 people die.
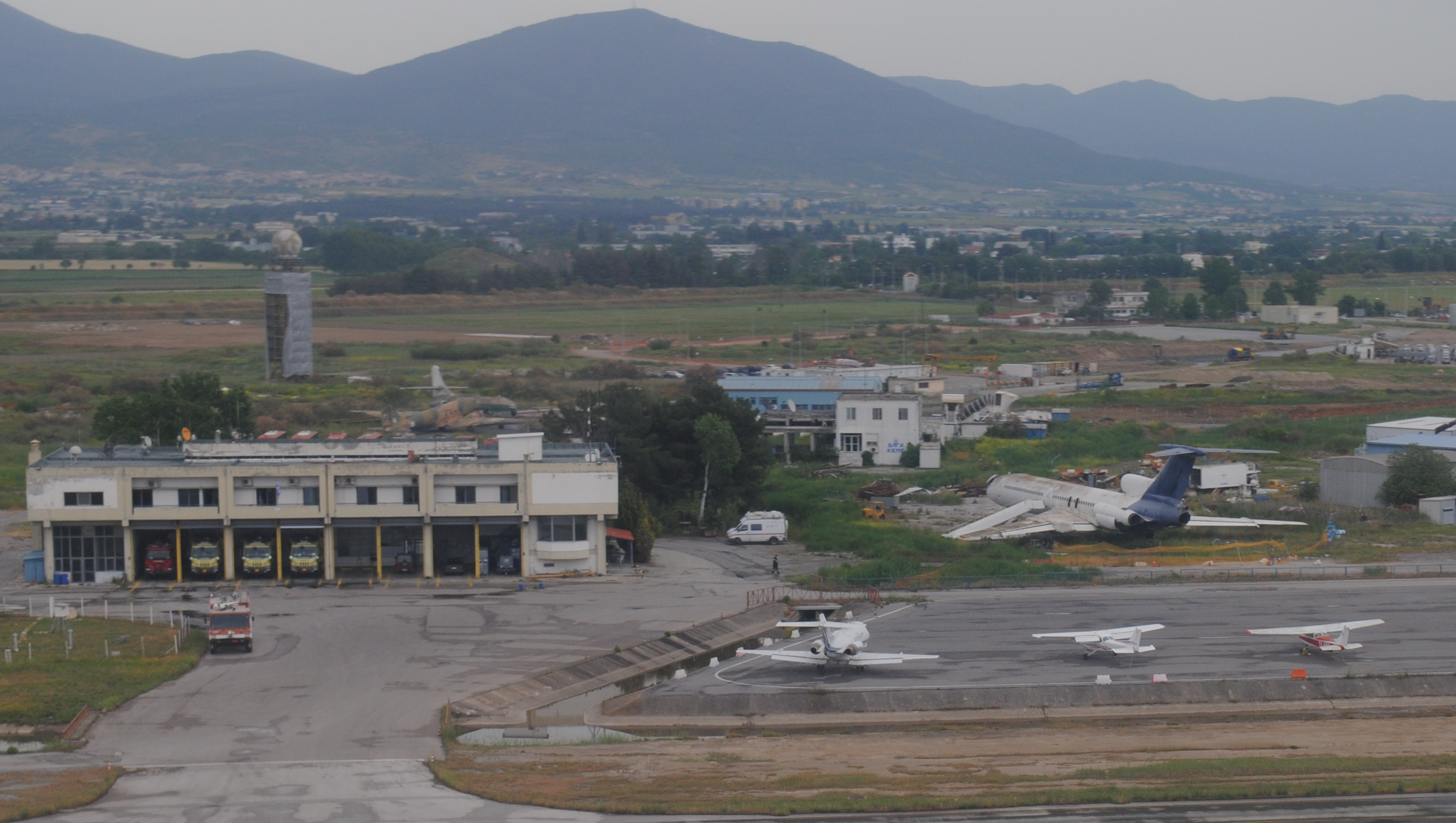
  Thessaloniki Airport featuring the hull of Malev Flight 262, used for fire training until 2018.
- 4 July 2000 – Malév Flight 262, a Tupolev Tu-154, performed a belly landing and skidded with the runway, causing significant damage. The aircraft initiated a go-around and landed safely.
- 14 August 2005 – **Helios Airways Flight 522**, a Boeing 737-300, suffered a gradual depressurisation as it ascended from Larnaca, Cyprus. All of the passengers and crews but one suffered hypoxia. The plane continued its automated planned route before circling over Athens. The aircraft eventually ran out of fuel and crashed near Grammatiko, killing all 121 on board.
- 3 October 2006 – Turkish Airlines Flight 1476, a Boeing 737-4Y0, is hijacked. Everyone survives without injuries.
- 16 July 2022 – Meridian Flight 3032, an Antonov An-12, crashed while attempting an emergency landing at Kavala International Airport. All 8 crew on board were killed.

=== Hungary ===
- 6 August 1961 – a Malév Hungarian Airlines Douglas TS-62 **crashed into a residential area** in Budapest, killing all 27 on board and 3 on the ground.

=== Iceland ===
- 29 May 1947 – a Flugfélag Íslands DC-3 **crashed** into a fjord in Héðinsfjörður, killing all 25 on board.
- 14 September 1950 – a Loftleiðir Douglas C-54 crashed into Bárðarbunga. The crew of 6 survived the crash but were stranded for days until they were rescued.
- 31 January 1951 – a Flugfélag Íslands DC-3 crashed into Faxaflói, killing all 20 on board.

=== Ireland ===
- 28 December 1946 – TWA Flight 6963, a Lockheed L-049 Constellation, crashed short of the runway at Shannon Airport. 9 people died while 14 people survived.
- 15 April 1948 – Pan Am Flight 1-10, a Lockheed L-049-51-26 Constellation, crashed short of the runway at Shannon Airport. 30 people died and 1 person survived.
- 5 September 1954 – KLM Flight 633, a Lockheed L-1049, ditched after takeoff from Shannon Airport on 5 September 1954. 28 deaths occurred.
- 22 June 1956 – Pan Am Clipper Panama, a Douglas DC-6B, suffers a fire in engine no.4. All 8 people on board survived.
- 15 July 1956 – a Swissair Convair CV-440 on a delivery flight lost control and crashed on approach to Shannon, killing all 4 crew on board.
- 22 July 1959 – a Pan Am DC-6 suffered an engine separation and fire on takeoff from Shannon Airport. All 8 occupants escaped.
- 26 February 1960 – Alitalia Flight 618, a DC-7, crashed on approach to Shannon Airport, killing 34.
- 10 September 1961 – a Douglas DC-6 operated by President Airlines **banked to the left and crashed** into Shannon River shortly after takeoff, killing all 83 people on board.
- 24 March 1968 – Aer Lingus Flight 712, a Vickers Viscount, suffered a structural failure and crashed into the sea off County Wexford in 1968, killing 61.
- 20 June 1979 – American Airlines Flight 293, a Boeing 727, is hijacked. The hijacker later received a Boeing 707. No one is injured.
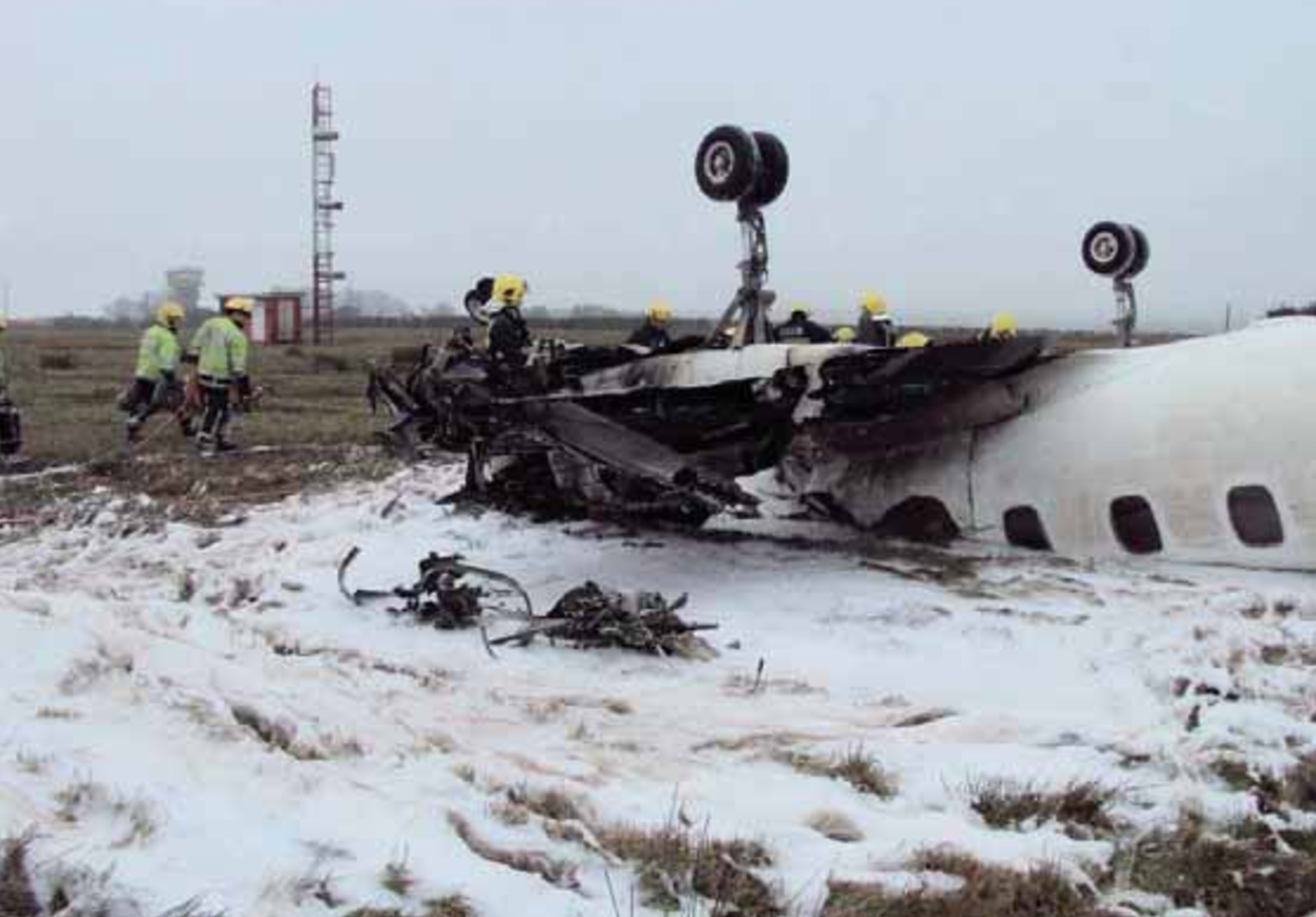
  Manx2 Flight 7100
- 10 February 2011 – Manx2 Flight 7100, Fairchild Swearingen Metroliner III operated by Flightline, was attempting to land at Cork Airport. After the flight commander ordered a go around, the aircraft banked hard left and then right until the wingtip touched the ground and the plane flipped over. The cause was determined to be lack of coordination between the pilots in a case of engine torque asymmetry, pilot fatigue and poor oversight by the operator. Six of the 12 aboard died.

=== Italy ===
- 2 August 1919 – a Caproni Ca.48 crashed at Verona, Italy (2 August 1919), killing all on board (14, 15, or 17 people).
- 4 May 1949 – a Fiat G.212 of Avio Linee Italiane crashed into Superga Hill, killing all 31 on board including the entire Torino Football Club.
- 26 October 1952 – BOAC Flight 115, a de Havilland Comet, overran the runway at Rome Fiumicino Airport. No one was killed.
- 10 January 1954 – BOAC Flight 781, a de Havilland DH.106 Comet 1, suffered an explosive decompression at altitude and crashed near Elba into the Mediterranean Sea, killing all 35 on board.
- 8 April 1954 – South African Airways Flight 201, a de Havilland Comet 1 operating for BOAC, suffered an explosive decompression at altitude and crashed south of Naples killing all 21 aboard.
- 13 February 1955 – Sabena Flight 503, a Douglas DC-6, crashed into Monte Terminillo near Rieti while flying in heavy snow and rain condition. All aboard were killed in the accident.
- 22 October 1958 – British European Airways Flight 142, a Vickers Viscount 701, collided with an Italian Air Force North American F-86E Sabre over Anzio. The passenger plane disintegrated, killing all 31 people on board. The person on the F-86 Sabre survived.
- 26 June 1959 – TWA Flight 891, a Lockheed Starliner, suffered a lightning strike and crashed in Olgiate Olona, killing all 68 on board.
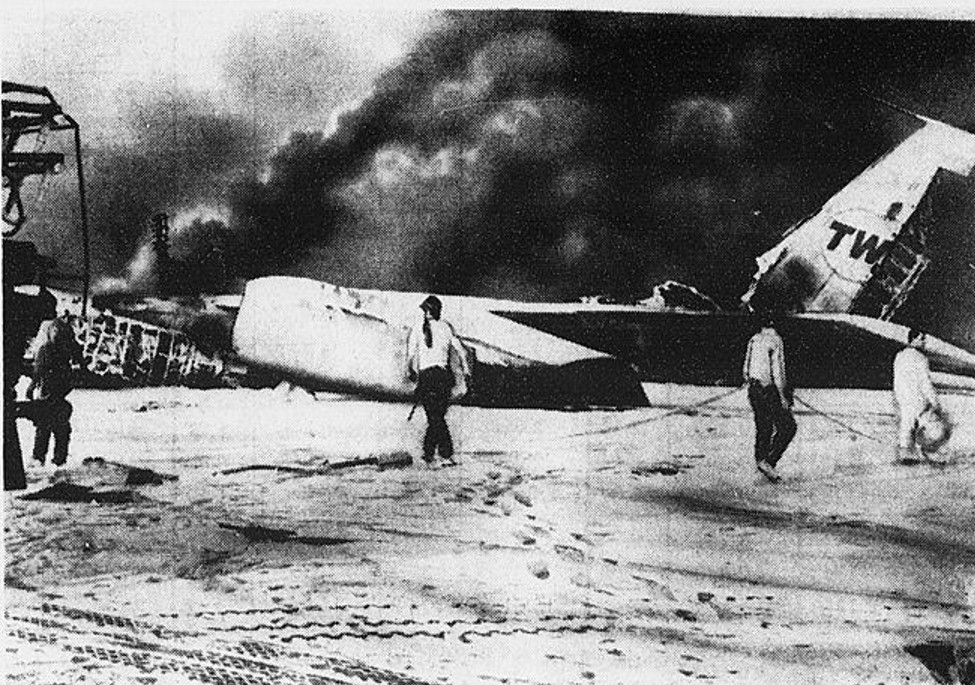
  TWA Flight 800
- 23 November 1964 – TWA Flight 800, a Boeing 707 suffered a thrust reverser malfunction on a rejected takeoff from Rome Fiumicino Airport. The aircraft overran the runway and crashed, killing 49 people.
- 2 August 1968 – Alitalia Flight 660, a DC-8, crashed into Mount San Giacomo in Vergiate, killing 12 of the 83 on board.
- 5 May 1972 – Alitalia Flight 112, a DC-8, crashed into Mount Longa, killing all 115 on board.
- 23 December 1978 – Alitalia Flight 4128, a DC-9, was approaching Palermo Airport when the aircraft crashed into the sea and sank, killing 108 people on board. The crew deliberately made a premature descent as they thought that they were nearer to the airport than they were.
- 14 September 1979 – Aero Trasporti Italiani Flight 12, a DC-9, crashed into a mountain near Sarroch on approach to Cagliari, killing all 31 on board.
- 27 June 1980 – Itavia Flight 870, a DC-9, crashed into the Tyrrhenian Sea near Ustica island en route to Palermo. The cause remains unclear; hypotheses include a bomb on board or an accidental shootdown by an anti-aircraft missile.
- 15 October 1987 – Aero Trasporti Italiani Flight 460, an ATR-42, rolled to the right and left several times and then dived into a mountain, eventually crashed, killing all 37 people on board.
- 17 October 1988 – Uganda Airlines Flight 775, a Boeing 707, clipped some trees, crashed, and burst onto flames while on approach to Roma-Fiumicino Airport on 17 October 1988. 33 deaths occurred.

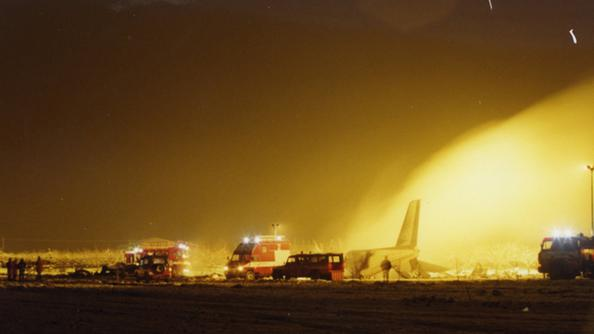
The wreckage of Banat Air Flight 166, which crashed due to icing

- 13 December 1995 – Banat Air Flight 166, an Antonov An-24, was taking off from Verona while carrying 49 passengers and crews on board. Due to ice accumulation on its wing, the aircraft lost its altitude and crashed, killing all aboard.
- 30 July 1997 – Air Littoral Flight 701A, an ATR 42, overran the runway at Florence Airport, killing the captain.
- 25 February 1999 – Alitalia Express Flight 1553, a Dornier 328 operated by Minerva Airlines, overran the runway at Genoa Cristoforo Colombo Airport and plunged into the sea. 4 people were killed.
- 8 October 2001 – the **Linate Airport disaster** occurred when Scandinavian Airlines Flight 686, a McDonnell Douglas MD-87, collided on takeoff with a Cessna Citation business jet. The Citation was destroyed instantly, and the MD-87 crashed into an airport hangar. All 114 on both aircraft and 4 on the ground were killed.
- 6 August 2005 – Tuninter Flight 1153, an ATR 72, ditched into the sea off the coast of Palermo following fuel exhaustion. 16 people were killed.
- 13 August 2006 – Air Algérie Flight 2208, a Lockheed Hercules, suffered an autopilot malfunction and crashed in Piacenza, killing all 3 crew members on board.
- 10 November 2008 – Ryanair Flight 4102, a Boeing 737-800, suffered a bird strike leading to a dual engine failure on landing at Rome Ciampino Airport. The aircraft was written off.
- 5 August 2016 – ASL Airlines Hungary Flight 7332, a Boeing 737-400SF operated by European Air Transport, overran the runway at Milan Bergamo Airport. Both pilots were injured but survived.

=== Kosovo ===
- 12 November 1999 – **Si Fly Flight 3275**, a UN-chartered ATR 42, crashed into the mountaintop in Slakovce, killing all 24 on board.

=== Latvia ===
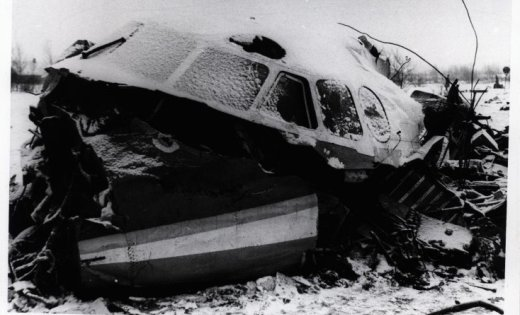
Aeroflot Flight L-51

- 30 December 1967 – **Aeroflot Flight L-51**, an An-24, lost control and crashed on approach to Liepāja, killing 43.

=== Lithuania ===
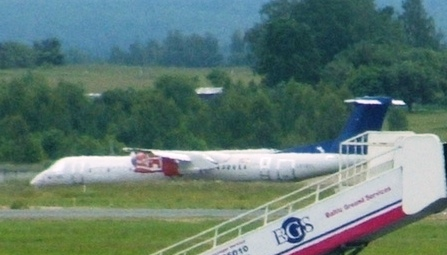
Scandinavian Airlines Flight 2748

- 9 September 2007 – Scandinavian Airlines Flight 2748, a Bombardier Dash 8, suffered a landing gear collapse at Vilnius Airport. All occupants were evacuated.
- 25 November 2024 – **Swiftair Flight 5960**, a Boeing 737-400 operating for EAT Leipzig, crashed into a house on approach to Vilnius, killing 1 of the 4 crew members on board.

=== Luxembourg ===
- 29 September 1982 – Aeroflot Flight 343, an Ilyushin Il-62M, veers off the runway on landing at Findel Airport due to a mechanical failure killing 7 and injuring 70.
- 6 November 2002 – **Luxair Flight 9642**, a Fokker 50, crashes on final approach to Luxembourg, killing 22.

=== Malta ===
- 18 February 1956 – a Scottish Airlines Avro York was taking off from RAF Luqa when the boost enrichment capsule in the carburetor of number one engine failed and the engine caught fire. The aircraft stalled and crashed, killing all 50 people aboard.
- 25 November 1973 – KLM Flight 861, Boeing 747-206B, is hijacked. No one is injured.
- 23 November 1985 – **EgyptAir Flight 648**, a Boeing 737, was hijacked by terrorist organization Abu Nidal. A standoff occurred in Malta Luqa Airport until 24 November 1985. A failed raid later occurred in the standoff, resulting in 60 deaths including 2 hijackers.
- 23 December 2016 – Afriqiyah Airways Flight 209, an Airbus A320, was hijacked to Malta. No deaths occurred.

=== Montenegro ===
- 11 September 1973 – **JAT Airways Flight 769**, a Sud Aviation SE-210 Caravelle 6-N, crashed into terrain while on final approach to Podgorica, killing 41. A suspected radar malfunction, accompanied by ATC error, was blamed for the accident

=== Netherlands ===
- 24 July 1928 – a KLM Fokker F.III crashed into the Waalhaven Harbour, killing 1 passenger.
- 14 July 1935 – a KLM Fokker F.XXII crashed shortly after takeoff from Schipol Airport following a dual engine failure, killing 6.
- 24 November 1946 – a Douglas C-47A Skytrain operated by KLM crashed on approach to Schipol Airport. All 26 on board died.
- 23 August 1954 – KLM Flight 608, a Douglas DC-6B, crashed in the North Sea. All 21 on board died.
- 6 October 1981 – NLM CityHopper Flight 431, a Fokker F-28-4000, encountered a tornado. The aircraft began to shake violently, and eventually the starboard wing of the plane detached from the plane. The plane spun and crashed, killing all 17on board and one on the ground.
- 4 April 1993 – KLM Cityhopper Flight 433, a Saab 340, returned to Schipol when pilots mistakenly believed that the engine 2 of the plane was suffering a low oil pressure due to a faulty warning light. While on final approach, the captain executed a go-around and applied full thrust only to engine 1. The aircraft lost control and crashed besides the runway, killing 4.

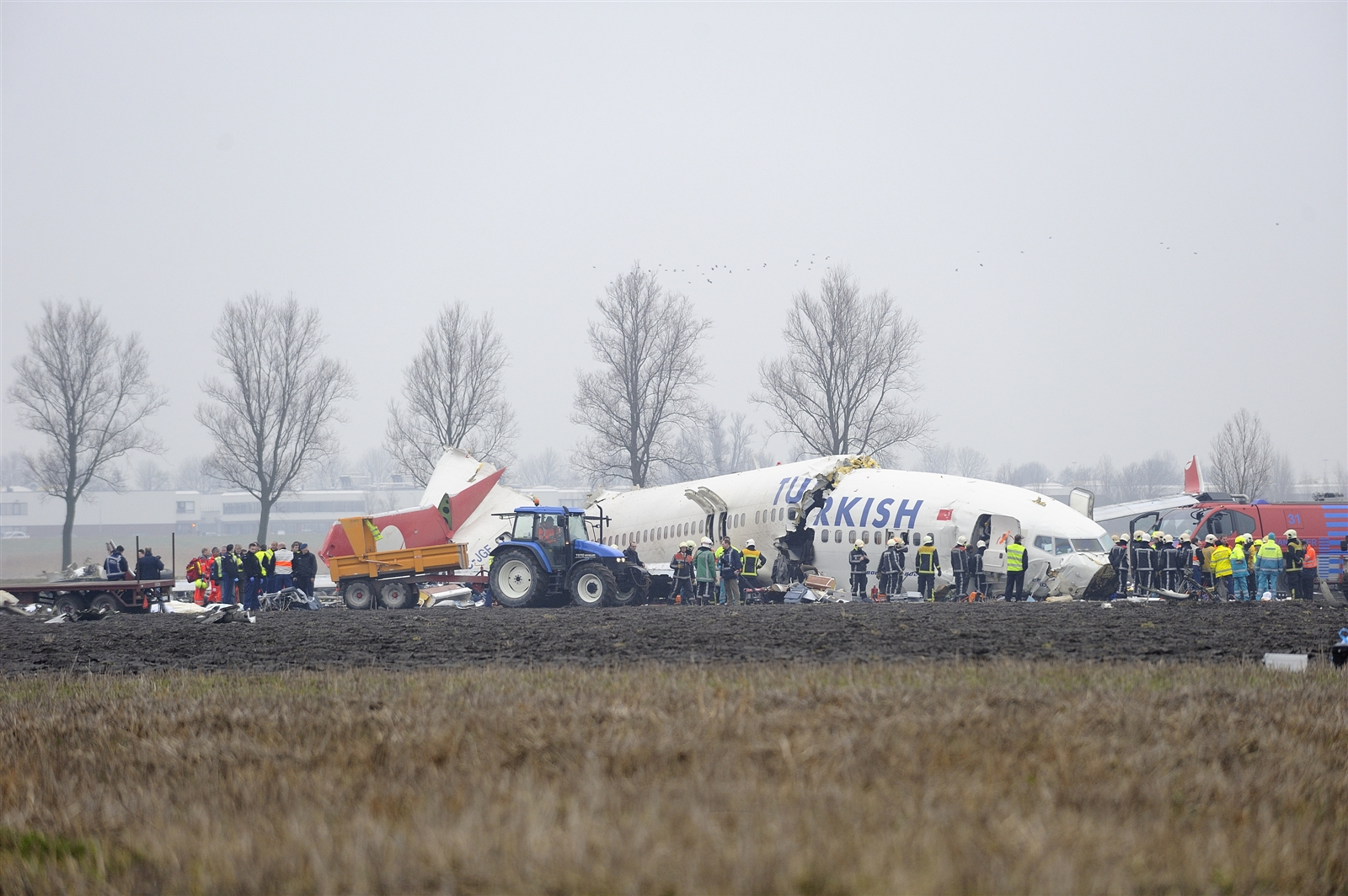
Turkish Airlines Flight 1951

- 4 October 1992 – **El Al Flight 1862**, a Boeing 747-200F, crashed into an apartment complex in Amsterdam after suffering engine detachment due to metal fatigue. The resultant crash killed 43 people, including all four crew members and 39 people on the ground.
- 25 September 1996 – a DC-3 being preserved and flown by the Dutch Dakota Association crashed into the Wadden Sea, killing all 32 on board.
- 25 February 2009 – Turkish Airlines Flight 1951, a Boeing 737-800, stalled and crashed into a field during final approach to Schipol Airport. Of the 127 passengers and 7 crew on board 9 were killed, 85 were injured along with 26 severely.
- 20 February 2021 – Longtail Aviation Flight 5504, a Boeing 747-400 suffered an uncontained engine failure above Meerssen. Debris fell from the aircraft, injuring 2 people on the ground. The aircraft made a successful emergency landing at Liège Airport, Belgium.

=== North Macedonia ===
- 5 March 1993 – Palair Macedonian Airlines Flight 301, a Fokker 100, stalled and crashed on takeoff from Skopje Airport due to ice accumulation, killing 83.
- 20 November 1993 – **Avioimpex Flight 110**, a Yakovlev Yak-42 operated by Saratov Airlines, flew into a snowstorm and turned into a mountain. The aircraft impacted terrain and exploded, killing all 116 on board.

=== Norway ===
- 7 August 1946 – British European Airways Flight 530, a Douglas C-47A Skytrain, crashes into Mistberget. 3 people die.
- 28 August 1947 – a Shorts S.25 Sandringham 6 operated by Det Norske Luftfartsselskap hits a mountain. All 35 on board die.
- 2 October 1948 – a flying boat operated by Det Norske Luftfartselskap, crashed upon landing in Trondheim, Norway. Nineteen were killed; Bertrand Russell was among the 24 survivors.
- 20 November 1949 – a Douglas C-47A-25DK operated by Aero Holland hits a mountain on approach to Oslo. 34 people die.
- 7 November 1956 – Braathens SAFE Flight 253, a de Havilland DH-114 Heron 2B, hits Hummelfjell due to icing. 2 people die.
- 9 August 1961 – an Eagle Airways Vickers Viscount crashed into a mountain near Stavanger, killing all 39 people on board. All except two of the passengers were students aged 13–16 years old.
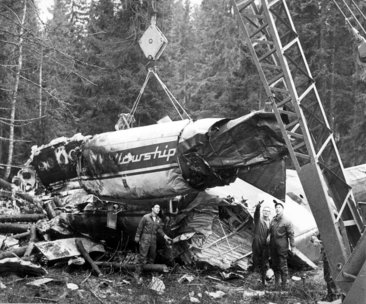
  Braathens SAFE Flight 253
- 23 December 1972 – Braathens SAFE Flight 239, a Fokker F28, crashed in Asker upon landing at Fornebu airport, Oslo, killing 40 of 45 people on board. The aircraft was four nautical miles off course in bad weather conditions.
- 26 June 1978 – Helikopter Service Flight 165, a Sikorsky S-61, crashed following a structural failure off the coast of Bergen, killing all 18 on board.
- 11 March 1982 – Widerøe Flight 933, a Twin Otter, crashed into the Barents Sea near Mehamn, killing all 15 on board. This incident remains highly controversial in Norway.
- 23 December 1987 – the pilots of Finnair Flight 915 alleged that the Soviet Union had fired a missile at the aircraft above Svalbard, which exploded 30 seconds before impact. Reports did not emerge until 2014, sparking controversy.
- 6 May 1988 – Widerøe Flight 710, a DHC-7, crashed in heavy fog in Torghatten, killing all 36 passengers and crew.
- 12 April 1990 – Widerøe Flight 839, a Twin Otter, crashed in the sea outside Værøya, killing all 5 persons on board.
- 27 October 1993 – Widerøe Flight 744, a de Havilland Canada DHC-6-300 Twin Otter, crashes on approach to Namsos Airport due to pilot error. 6 people die and 13 others are injured.
- 29 August 1996 – **Vnukovo Airlines Flight 2801**, a Tupolev Tu-154, crashed into a mountain on Svalbard killing all 141 people on board.
- 8 September 1997 – Helikopter Service Flight 451, a Eurocopter Super Puma, crashed into the Norwegian Sea following a mechanical failure. All 12 on board were killed.
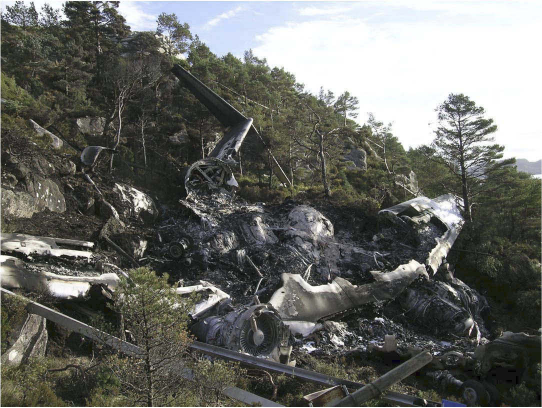
  Atlantic Airways Flight 670
- 10 October 2006 – Atlantic Airways Flight 670, a BAe 146, slides off the runway at Stord Airport, Norway, killing four of the 16 people on board.
- 29 April 2016 – CHC Helikopter Service Flight 241, a Eurocopter Super Puma, crashed near Turøy after the main rotor detached from the helicopter. All 13 on board were killed.
- 26 October 2017 – Convers Avia Flight 312, a Mil Mi-8 helicopter, crashed off the coast of Isfjorden, killing all 8 on board.

=== Poland ===
- 15 November 1951 – a LOT Lisunov Li-2 suffered an engine failure in mid-air. The pilots lost control of the plane, hit a power line, crashed and burst into flames in Tuszyn. All 18 people aboard were killed.

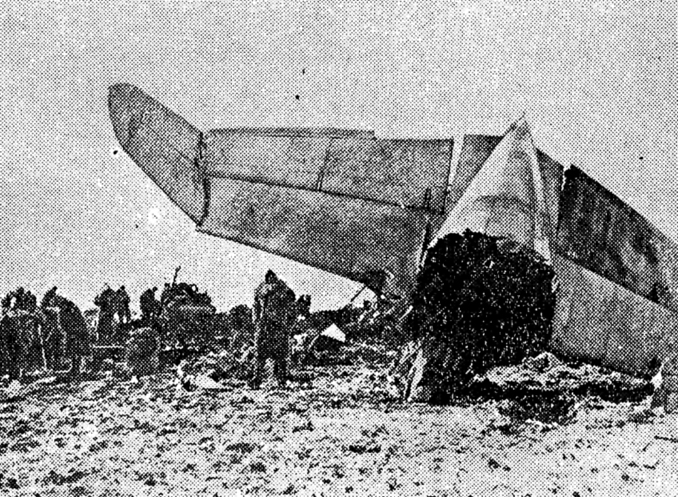
Wreckage of the 1962 LOT Vickers Viscount crash

- 19 December 1962 – a LOT Vickers Viscount crashed on approach to Warsaw, killing all 33 on board.
- 2 April 1969 – LOT Polish Airlines Flight 165, an Antonov An-24, crashed into a mountain near Zawoja, killing all 53 on board.
- 14 March 1980 – LOT Polish Airlines Flight 007, an Ilyushin Il-62, crashed on a go-around Okęcie Airport in Warsaw due to an uncontained engine failure. All 87 on board were killed.
- 9 May 1987 – **LOT Polish Airlines Flight 5055**, an Il-62, crashed in Kabacki Forest near Warsaw after suffering an uncontained engine failure and in-flight fire. All 183 on board were killed.
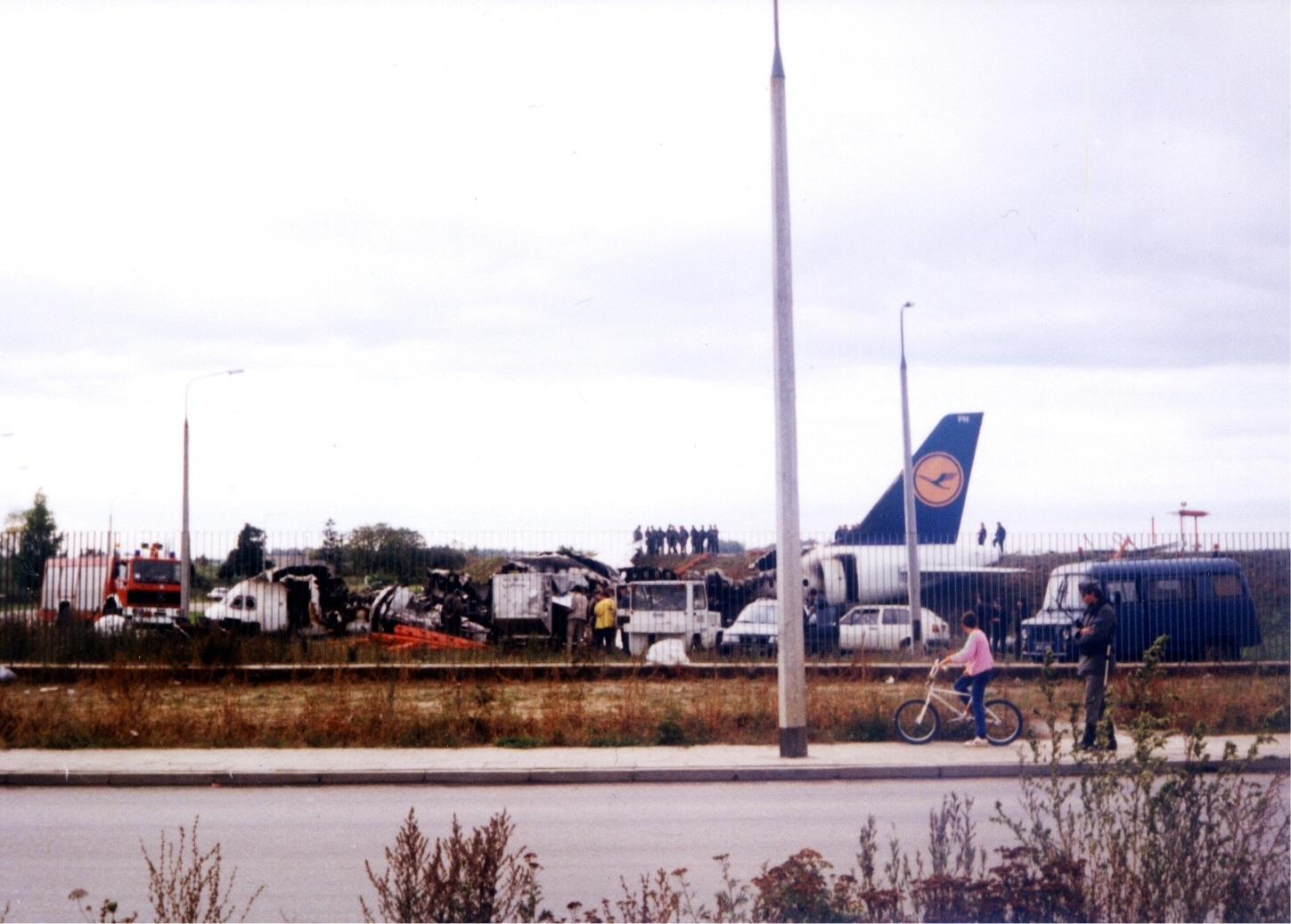
  Lufthansa Flight 2904
- 2 November 1988 – LOT Flight 703, an An-24, crash-landed at high speed, bounced back, and burst into flames near Białobrzegi. 1 person was killed.
- 14 September 1993 – Lufthansa Flight 2904, an Airbus A320, overran the runway at Warsaw Chopin Airport. 2 people were killed.
- 1 November 2011 – LOT Polish Airlines Flight 16, a Boeing 767, made an emergency belly landing at Warsaw Chopin Airport after the landing gear failed to deploy. No one was seriously harmed.

=== Portugal ===
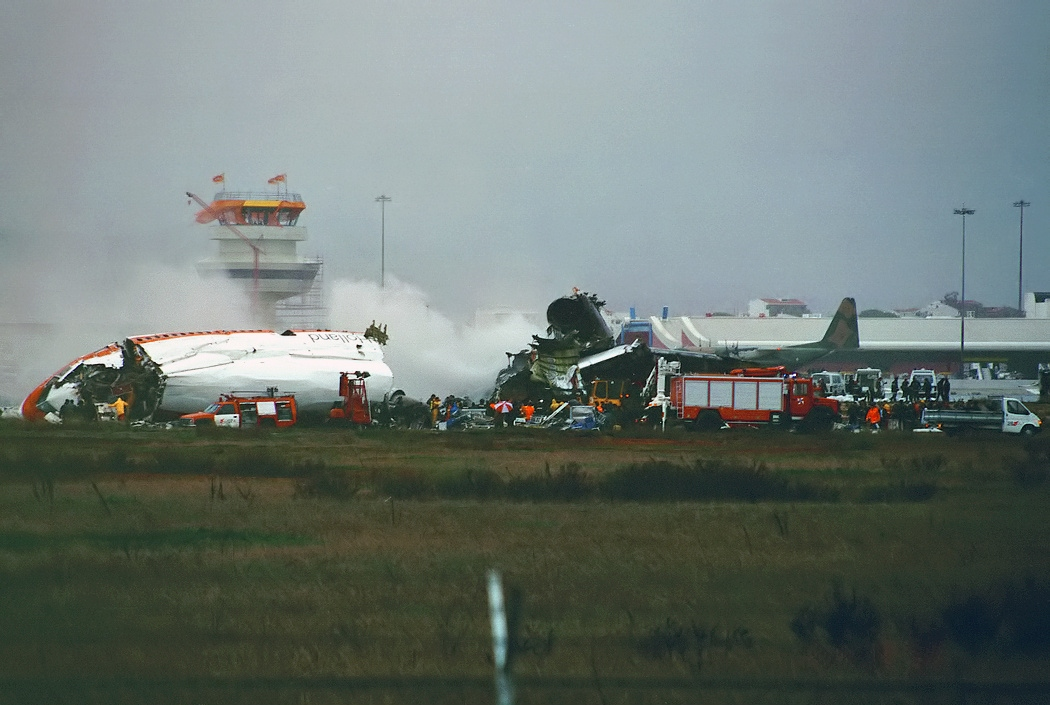
Martinair Flight 495

- 22 February 1943 – a Pan Am Boeing 314 named Yankee Clipper crashed in Lisbon, killing 24.
- 30 May 1961 – Viasa Flight 897, a DC-8, spiraled to the left and impacted the ocean off the coast of Lisbon, killing all 61 people on board.
- 19 November 1977 – TAP Portugal Flight 425, a Boeing 727, overran the runway at Madeira Airport and plunged over a steep bank, killing 131 people on board.
- 18 December 1977 – SATA Flight 730, a Sud Aviation Caravelle, crashed on approach to Madeira Airport, killing 36.
- 8 February 1989 – **Independent Air Flight 1851**, a Boeing 707 flying on behalf of Dominair, crashed on approach to Santa Maria Airport in the Azores, due to pilot and air traffic control errors. All 144 on board died.
- 21 December 1992 – Martinair Flight 495, a DC-10, crashed on landing at Faro Airport after flying through two microbursts. 56 people on board were killed.
- 11 December 1999 – SATA Flight 530, a BAe ATP, crashed into Pico da Esperança on São Jorge Island, killing all 35 on board.
- 24 August 2001 – Air Transat Flight 236, an Airbus A330-200, ran out of fuel over the Atlantic Ocean and glided successfully to the Azores.
- 11 November 2018 – Air Astana Flight 1388, an Embraer E190 on a repositioning flight, suffered severe control issues over Lisbon and made several inadvertent extreme manoeuvers. The aircraft eventually made an emergency landing at Beja Airbase. None of the 6 on board were killed, but the aircraft was written off.

=== Romania ===
- 4 February 1970 – TAROM Flight 35, an Antonov An-24, crashed into a mountain on approach to Oradea International Airport, killing 20 of the 21 on board.
- 21 September 1977 – Malév Flight 203, a Tupolev Tu-134, crashed on approach to Bucharest Airport, killing 27 of the 53 people on board.
- 31 March 1995 – **TAROM Flight 371**, an Airbus A310, crashed near Baloteşti due to auto-throttle failure followed by the apparent incapacitation of the captain. All 60 on board were killed.
- 14 September 1999 – Olympic Airways Flight 3838, a Dassault Falcon 900 operated for and owned by the Hellenic Air Force, suffered severe pilot-induced oscillations on approach to Bucharest Airport. 7 people were killed, including Greek deputy foreign minister Giannos Kranidiotis.

=== Russia ===
- 11 October 1984 – **Aeroflot Flight 3352**, a Tu-154, crashed into maintenance vehicles upon landing at Omsk Airport, killing 174 on the aircraft and four more in the vehicles. The air traffic controller had fallen asleep on duty, heavily contributing to the error.

=== Serbia ===
- 19 August 1996 – **Spair Flight 3601**, an Ilyushin Il-76, crashed northeast of Belgrade International Airport after suffering an electrical failure. All 11 on board were killed.
- 18 February 2024 – Air Serbia Flight 324, an Embraer E195 operated by Marathon Airlines, overran the runway at Belgrade Nikola Tesla Airport on takeoff. The aircraft struck multiple ground structures before lifting off. The crew made a successful return to Belgrade, and the aircraft was written off.

=== Slovakia ===
- 24 November 1966 – **TABSO Flight 101**, an Ilyushin Il-18, was on approach when it crashed in the foothills of Little Carpathians, near Bratislava on 24 November 1966. All 82 aboard were killed.
- 28 July 1976 – ČSA Flight 001, an Il-18, suffered multiple engine failures on landing at Bratislava Airport. As the crew attempted a go-around, the plane's right bank increased due to asymmetric thrust. It eventually crashed into Zlaté piesky, killing 76 people.
- 20 August 2015 – the Červený Kameň mid-air collision occurred when two Let L-410 aircraft of Dubnica Air collided over Červený Kameň. 7 people were killed in total.

=== Slovenia ===
- 1 September 1966 – **Britannia Airways Flight 105**, a Bristol Britannia, crashed into a forest near Ljubljana, killing 98 out of 110 passengers and crew.

=== Spain ===
- 9 May 1957 – Aviaco Flight 111, a Bristol 170, lost control and crashed on approach to Madrid Barajas Airport, killing all 37 on board.
- 4 December 1958 – an Aviaco SNCASE Languedoc crashed into the Guadarrama Mountains, killing all 21 on board.
- 19 August 1959 – a Douglas Dakota operated by Transair crashed into the Montseny Massif, killing all 32 on board.
- 2 October 1964 – a UTA Douglas DC-6 crashed in Alcazaba, killing all 80 on board.
- 5 May 1965 – Iberia Flight 401, a Lockheed Super Constellation, landed off the runway in poor visibility at Los Rodeos Airport. The aircraft struck runway vehicles and crashed, killing 30 of the 49 people on board.
- 3 July 1970 – Dan-Air Flight 1903, a de Havilland DH 106 Comet series 4, was approaching Barcelona Airport when it flew into the woods of Serralada del Montseny near Arbúcies, killing all 112 on board.
- 7 January 1972 – Iberia Flight 602, a Sud Aviation Caravelle flew into the Sierra de Atalayasa near Ibiza Airport, killing all 104 on board.
- 6 July 1972 – Aviaco Flight 331, a Douglas DC-8, crashed into the sea on approach to Gran Canaria, killing all 10 crew members on board.
- 3 December 1972 – A Spantax Convair CV-990 Coronado charter flight entered a left bank and crashed after taking off from Los Rodeos Airport, killing all 155 passengers and crew.
- 13 August 1973 – Aviaco Flight 118, a Sud Aviation SE 210 Caravelle carrying 85 people, crashed into a village near Montrove killing everyone on board. One person also died on the ground.
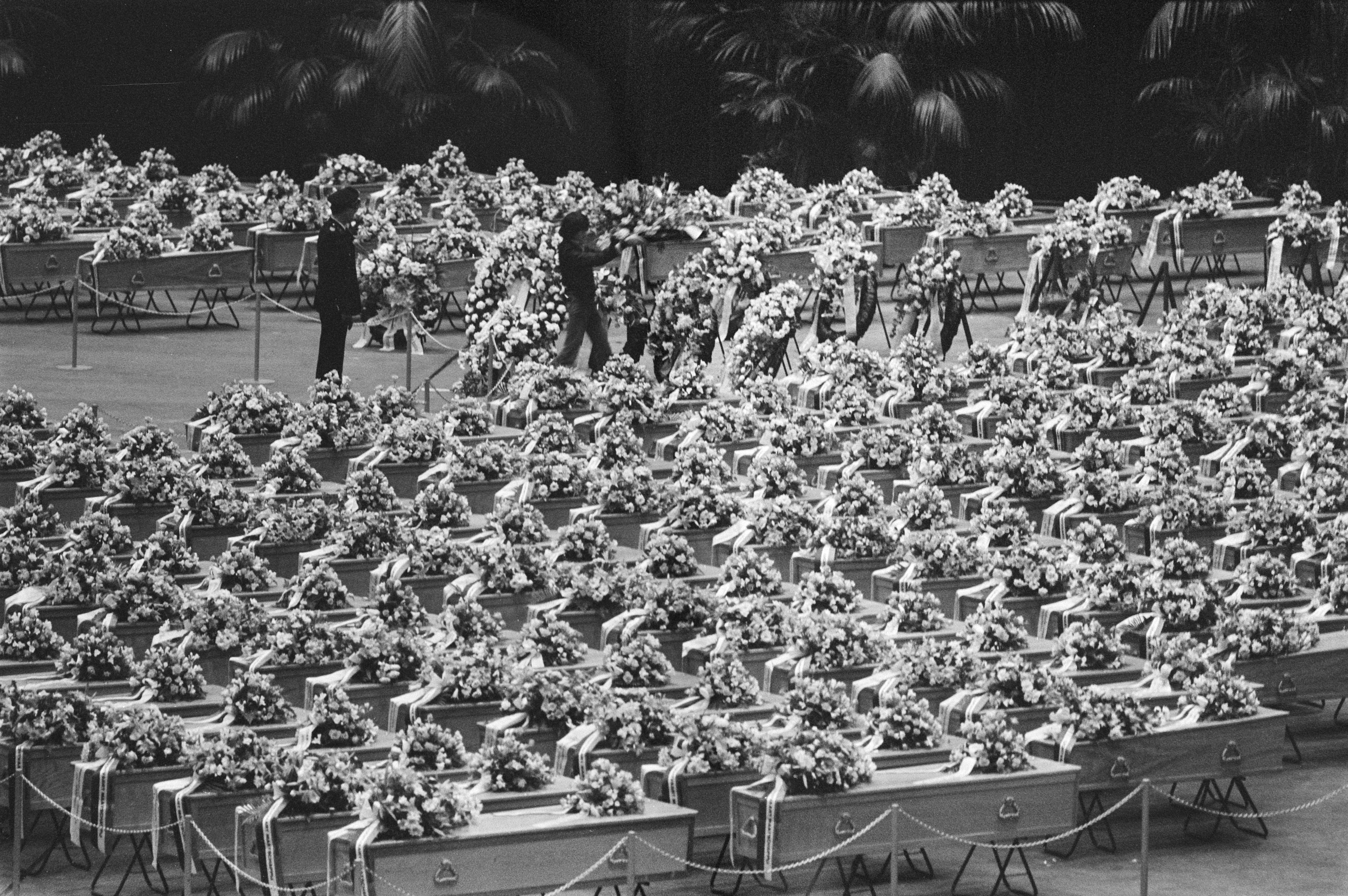
  Memorial service for the victims of the Tenerife Airport disaster, the deadliest aviation accident in history
- 27 March 1977 – the **Tenerife Airport Disaster** occurred when KLM Flight 4805, a Boeing 747-200, and Pan Am Flight 1736, a 747-100, collided on the runway at Tenerife Los Rodeos Airport. Both aircraft had been diverted along with several others, and in poor visibility and a crowded airfield, the KLM flight attempted to depart without proper clearance while the Pan Am flight was taxiing on the runway. Other factors including air traffic control limitations and lack of standard terminology were cited. 583 people were killed – all 248 on the KLM aircraft, and 335 on the Pan Am flight, leaving 61 survivors. It is the deadliest aviation accident to ever occur.
- 25 April 1980 – Dan-Air Flight 1008, a Boeing 727, crashed into a mountain on Tenerife near Los Rodeos. All 146 people aboard were killed.
- 13 December 1982 – Spantax Flight 995, a DC-10-30CF, overran the runway during an aborted takeoff at Málaga Airport, killing 50 people.
- 27 November 1983 – Avianca Flight 011, a Boeing 747, crashed on approach to Madrid Barajas Airport. It hit terrain, bounced back and crashed in an inverted position, killing 181 of the 192 people on board.
- 7 December 1983 – the Madrid runway disaster occurred when Iberia Flight 350, a Boeing 727-256 Adv., collided with Aviaco Flight 134, a DC-9-32, on the runway at Madrid Barajas Airport. 93 people were killed, including Mexican actress Fanny Cano and South African pianist Marc Raubenheimer.
- 19 February 1985 – Iberia Flight 610, a Boeing 727-256, struck a television antenna, separating the wing from the plane. It banked heavily and crashed on the top of Mount Oiz in Biscay, near Bilbao. All 148 people on board were killed. Pilot error was the cause.
- 14 September 1999 – Britannia Airways Flight 226A, a Boeing 757-200, ran off the runway at Girona-Costa Brava Airport, killing one passenger.
- 7 February 2001 – Iberia Flight 1456, an Airbus A320, experienced a microburst on short final at Bilbao Airport, causing a hard touch down leading to the landing gear collapsing. 25 people suffered injuries.
- 29 August 2001 – Binter Mediterráneo Flight 8261, a CASA CN 235, made a forced landing on the N-340 highway near Málaga Airport, killing 4.
- 10 October 2001 – Flightline Flight 101, a Fairchild Swearingen Metroliner, crashed into the Mediterranean Sea near the Columbretes Islands after a lightning strike killing all 10 on board.
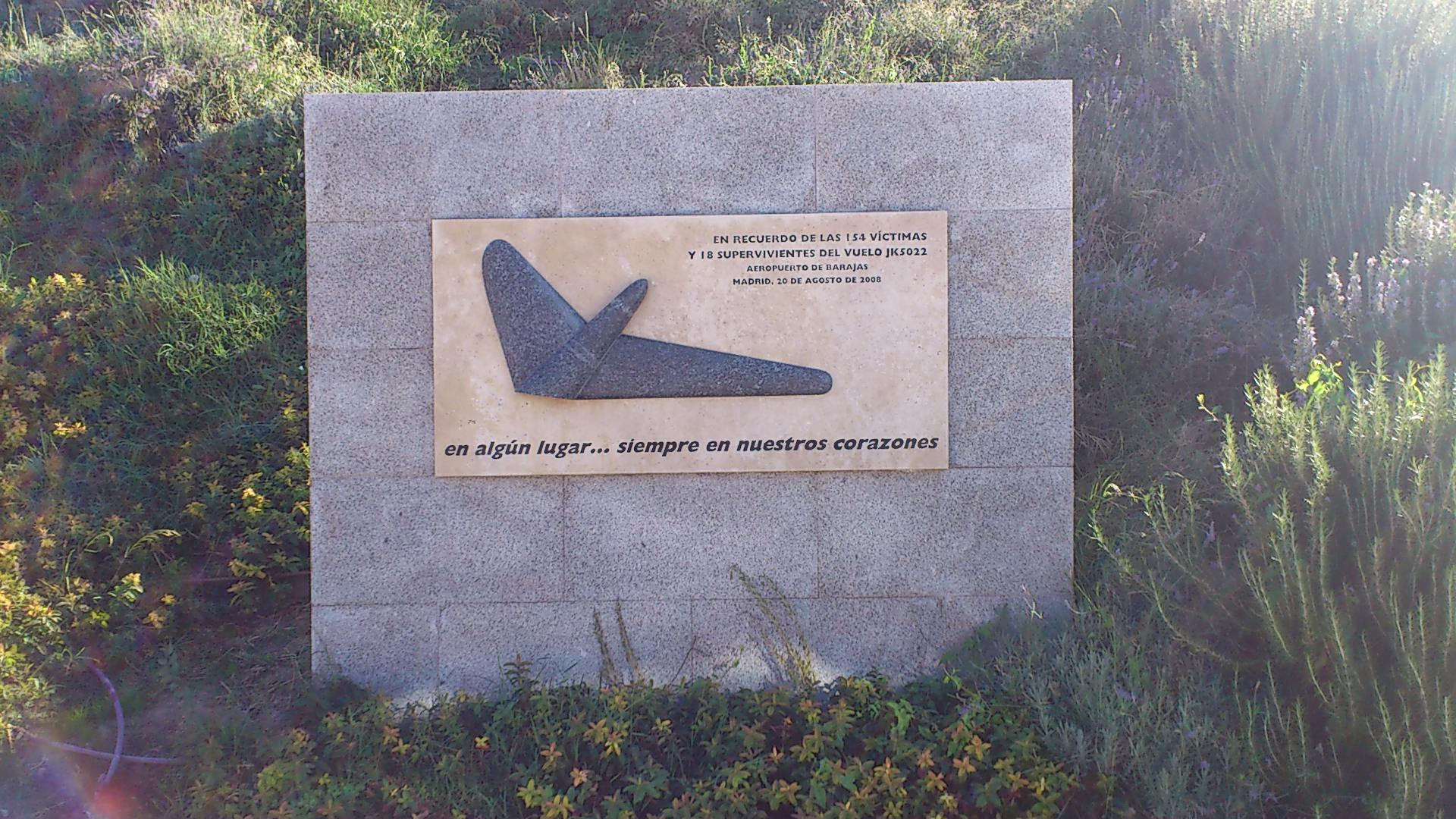
  A plaque for 154 victims of Spanair Flight 5022
- 20 August 2008 – Spanair Flight 5022, a McDonnell Douglas MD-82, stalled, veered off the runway, and crashed on takeoff at Madrid Barajas International Airport, killing 154 passengers and crew, leaving 18 survivors. The pilots didn't reset the flaps/slats after a previous aborted takeoff.

=== Sweden ===
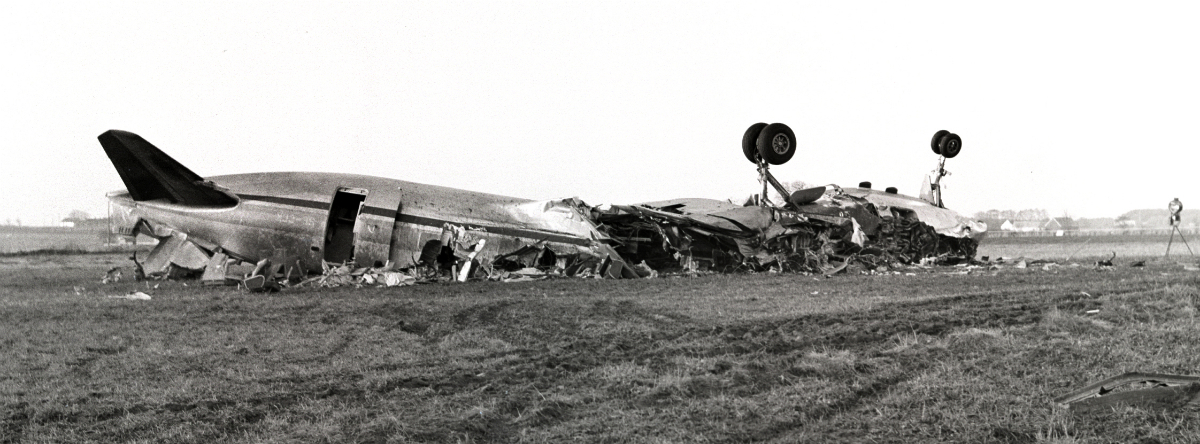
Wreckage of Linjeflyg Flight 277

- 5 January 1970 – Convair Coronado of Spantax crashed shortly after take-off from Stockholm Arlanda Airport, killing 5 people out of 10.
- 20 November 1964 – **Linjeflyg Flight 267**, a Convair 440, crashed on approach to Ängelholm–Helsingborg Airport, killing 31 people.
- 15 January 1977 – Linjeflyg Flight 618, a Vickers Viscount operated by Skyline, lost control and crashed during approach to Stockholm Bromma Airport due to atmospheric icing. All 22 on board were killed.
- 27 December 1991 – Scandinavian Airlines Flight 751, a McDonnell Douglas MD-81, suffered a dual engine failure on climbout after the engines ingested ice that had detached from the wings. The aircraft crash landed in a field in Gottröra and broke into three pieces. No one was killed.
- 8 January 2016 – West Air Sweden Flight 294, a Bombardier CRJ200, nose-dived and crashed near Akkajaure, killing both pilots. Instrument failure lead to the pilots suffering spatial disorientation.

=== Switzerland ===
- 20 July 1935 – a KLM Douglas DC-2 crashed in Mesocco, killing all 13 on board.
- 24 November 1956 – ČSA Flight 548, an Ilyushin Il-12, crashed shortly after takeoff from Zurich Airport, killing all 23 on board.
- 4 September 1963 – Swissair Flight 306, a Sud Aviation SE-210 Caravelle III, was taking off from Zurich when a fire occurred on board. The prolonged fire damaged the aircraft's hydraulic system, causing the aircraft to lose control and crash, killing all 80 people on board.
- 18 February 1969 – El Al Flight 432, a Boeing 720, was attacked while preparing for takeoff at Zurich Airport. 1 crew member was killed.
- 21 February 1970 – Swissair Flight 330, a Convair Coronado, crashed near Würenlingen following detonation of a bomb on board. All 47 on board were killed.
- 18 January 1971 – Balkan Bulgarian Airlines Flight 130, an Ilyushin Il-18, crashed on approach to Zurich Airport, killing 45 of the 47 on board.
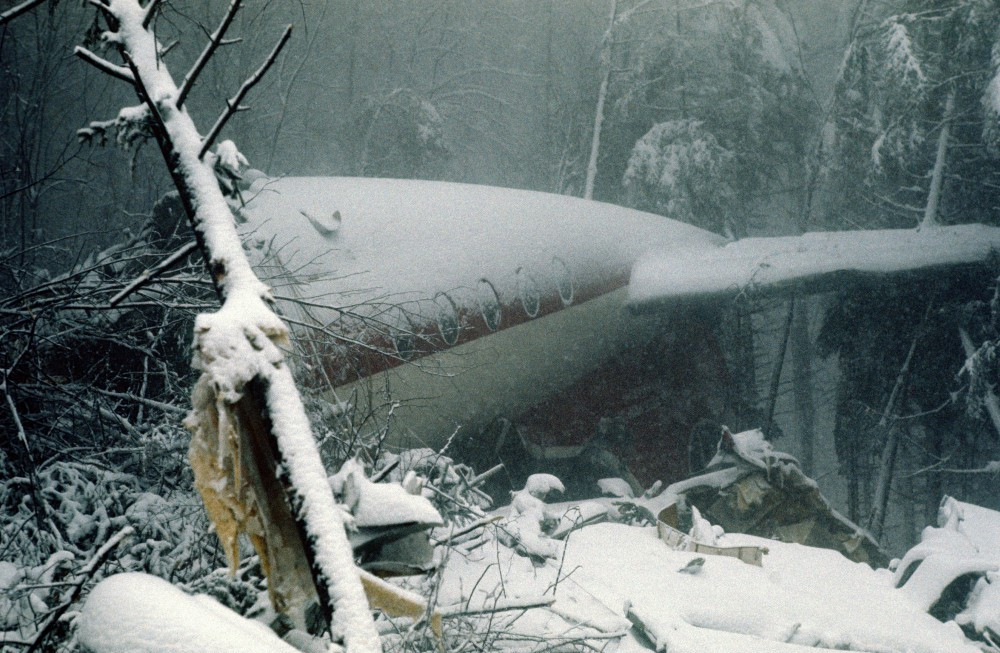
  Invicta Flight 435
- 10 April 1973 – **Invicta International Airlines Flight 435**, a Vickers Vanguard, crashed into a mountain near Hochwald, killing all 108 on board.
- 24 July 1987 – Air Afrique Flight 056, a DC-10, was hijacked and diverted to Geneva Airport. One passenger was shot, and the aircraft was raided after the passengers had evacuated themselves.
- 14 November 1990 – Alitalia Flight 404, a McDonnell Douglas DC-9, flew into a mountain near Weiach after its faulty navigational system caused the plane to not warn the pilots about the flight's dangerously low altitude. All 46 on board were killed.
- 10 January 2000 – Crossair Flight 498, a Saab 340, dived, spiraled and crashed in Niederhasli, killing all 10 on board.
- 24 November 2001 – Crossair Flight 3597, an Avro RJ100, was on final approach to Zurich Airport when it crashed into a hill. The aircraft slid and broke up, killing 24 people including several high-profile singers. Pilot error was blamed.
- 17 February 2014 – Ethiopian Airlines Flight 702, a Boeing 767, was carrying 202 passengers and crews when it was hijacked by the co-pilot over Sudan and landed at Geneva International Airport. The co-pilot was arrested.

=== Ukraine ===
- 17 August 1957 – the Kyiv mid-air collision occurred when two Aeroflot Ilyushin Il-14 aircraft collided above Kyiv. All 9 on both aircraft were killed as well as 6 on the ground.
- 16 November 1959 – Aeroflot Flight 315, an Antonov An-10, lost control and crashed short of the runway at Lviv Airport, killing all 40 on board.
- 26 February 1960 – Aeroflot Flight 315, an Antonov An-10, lost control and crashed short of the runway at Lviv Airport, killing 32 of the 33 on board.
- 17 August 1960 – Aeroflot Flight 036, an Ilyushin Il-18, crashed near Tarasovich following an engine fire, killing all 34 on board.
- 3 August 1969 – Aeroflot Flight N-826, an An-24, crashed in Preobrazhenka, killing all 55 on board.
- 2 September 1970 – Aeroflot Flight 3630, a Tupolev Tu-124, crashed near Dnipro, killing all 37 on board.
- 31 March 1971 – Aeroflot Flight 1969, an An-10, crashed after the right wing detached on approach to Luhansk International Airport, killing all 65 on board.
- 16 September 1971 – Malév Flight 110, a Tu-134, crashed on takeoff from Kyiv Boryspil Airport, killing all 49 on board.
- 12 November 1971 – Aeroflot Flight N-63, an An-24, stalled and crashed near Vinnitsa Airport, killing all 48 on board.
- 18 May 1972 – Aeroflot Flight 1491, an Antonov An-10, suffered a structural failure of both wings on approach to Kharkiv International Airport, killing all 122 on board.
- 15 May 1976 – Aeroflot Flight 1802, an Antonov An-24, suffered a rudder hardover and crashed near Viktorovka, killing all 52 on board.
- 17 December 1976 – Aeroflot Flight N-36, an An-24, crashed on landing at Zhuliany Airport, killing 48.
- 11 August 1979 – the Dniprodzerzhynsk mid-air collision occurred when two Aeroflot Tupolev Tu-134s collided near Dniprodzerzhynsk, killing all 178 on both aircraft.
- 3 May 1985 – Aeroflot Flight 8381, a Tupolev Tu-134, was descending to Lviv Airport when it collided with a Soviet Air Force Antonov An-26. Both aircraft lost their right wings and tails, and crashed near the village of Zolochiv, killing 94 people.
- 19 June 1987 – Aeroflot Flight 528, a Yakovlev Yak-40, touched down too fast at Berdiansk Airport, and overran the runway on an attempted go-around. 8 people were killed.
- 22 August 2006 – Pulkovo Aviation Enterprise Flight 612, a Tupolev Tu-154M, was flying over Donetsk Oblast in stormy conditions when it stalled and crashed near Sukha Balka, killing all 170 people on board. Ukraine officials blamed pilot error, flying the aircraft higher than its design altitude.
- 13 February 2013 – South Airlines Flight 8971, an An-24, crashed on landing at Donetsk International Airport, killing 5.

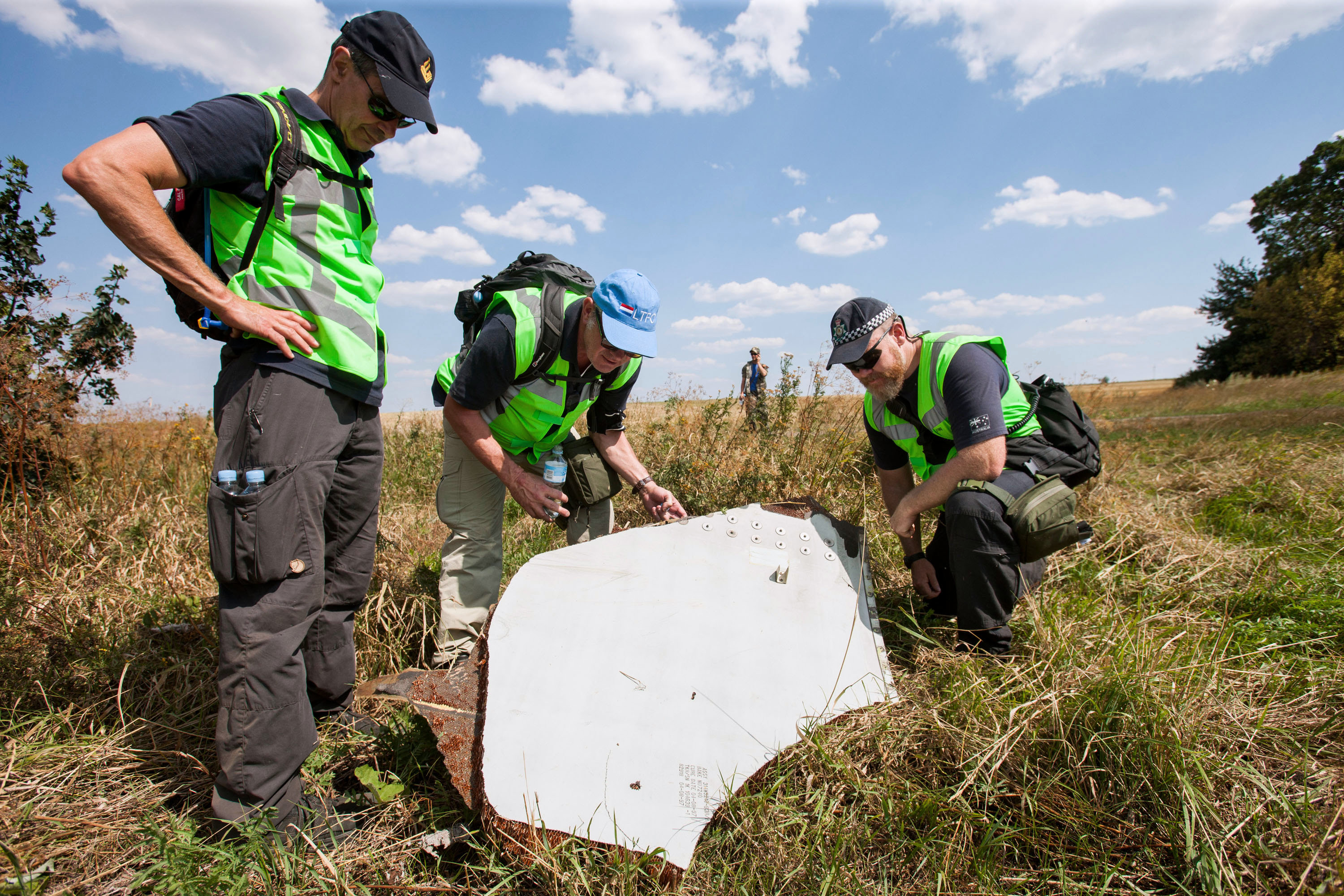
Part of the downed Malaysia Airlines Flight 17

- 17 July 2014 – **Malaysia Airlines Flight 17**, a Boeing 777-200ER, was flying over Ukraine while en route to Kuala Lumpur International Airport when it was hit by a surface-to-air missile. The aircraft disintegrated and crashed near Hrabove. All 298 people on board killed.

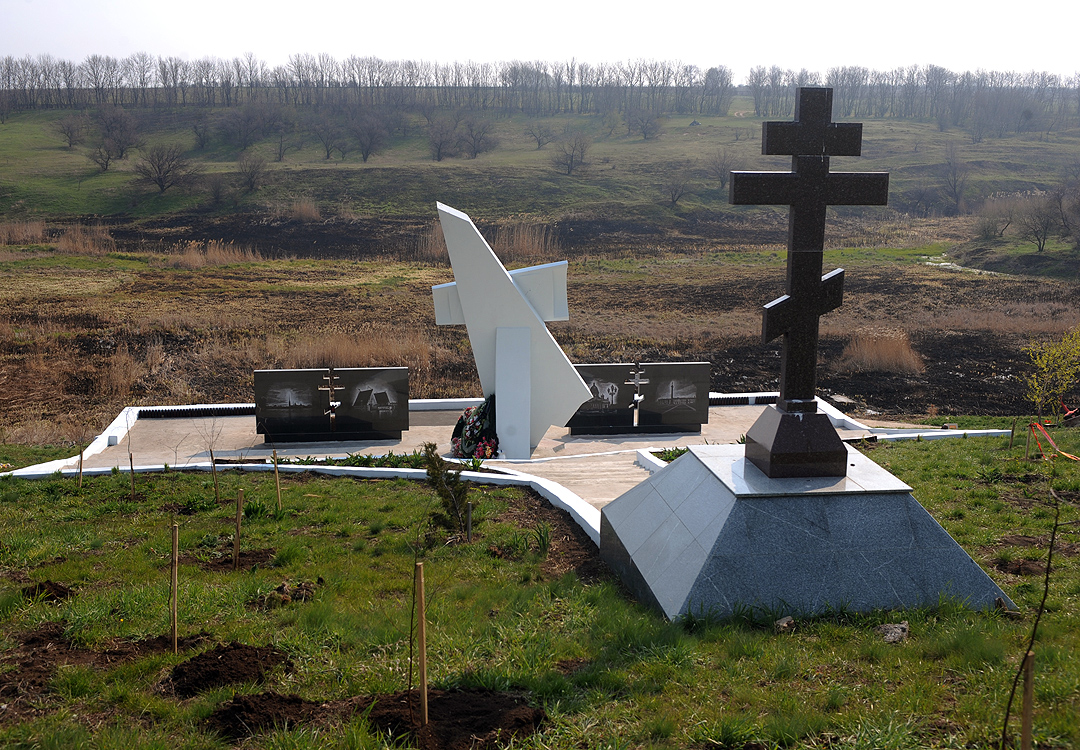
Memorial of Pulkovo Aviation Enterprise Flight 612

- 4 October 2019 – Ukraine Air Alliance Flight 4050, an An-12, crashed on approach to Lviv International Airport after suffering fuel exhaustion. 5 of the 8 crew members were killed.

=== United Kingdom ===
- 21 December 1988 – **Pan Am Flight 103**, a Boeing 747, was destroyed by a bomb over the town of Lockerbie. All 259 on board were killed, and 11 on the ground were killed when the aircraft fell onto residential areas.

== Oceania ==
=== Australia ===
- 21 March 1931 – an Australian National Airways Avro Ten crashed into the Snowy Mountains in severe weather, killing all 8 on board.
- 19 February 1937 – an Airlines of Australia Stinson Model A crashed near the border of Queensland and New South Wales, killing 5.
- 25 October 1938 – an Australian National Airways Douglas DC-2 crashed into Mount Dandenong, Victoria, killing all 18 on board.
- 3 March 1942 – a DC-3 of KNILM was shot down over Western Australia by the Imperial Japanese Navy Air Service. 4 people were killed.
- 31 January 1945 – an Australian National Airways Stinson Model A crashed near Redesdale, Victoria, killing all 10 on board.
- 10 March 1946 – an Australian National Airways DC-3 crashed at Seven-Mile Beach, Tasmania, killing all 25 on board.
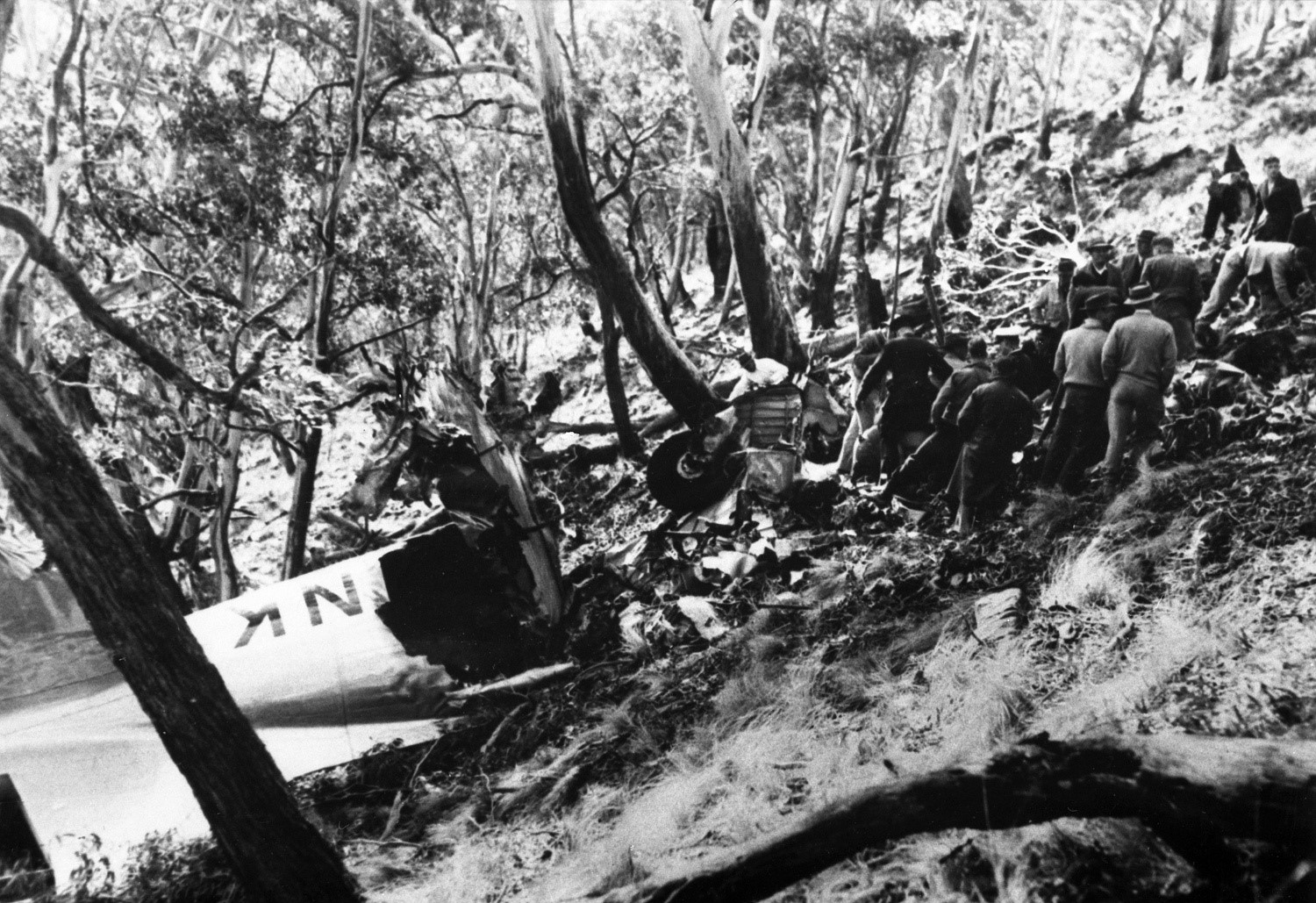
  1948 Australian National Airways DC-3 crash
- 2 September 1948 – Australian National Airways Flight 331, a DC-3, crashed in New South Wales, killing all 13 on board.
- 10 March 1949 – a Lockheed Lodestar of Queensland Airlines crashed at Coolangatta, Queensland, killing all 21 on board.
- 2 July 1949 – a MacRobertson Miller Aviation DC-3 Fitzroy crashed immediately after takeoff from Perth, killing all 18 on board.
- 26 June 1950 – an Australian National Airways DC-4 **crashed** after departure from Perth, killing all 29 on board.
- 10 June 1960 – **Trans Australia Airlines Flight 538**, a Fokker F27, crashed into the sea while preparing to land at Mackay, Queensland, killing all 29 on board.
- 19 July 1960 – Trans Australia Airlines Flight 408, a Lockheed Electra, was hijacked above Brisbane. The hijacker was restrained and no casualties occurred.
- 30 November 1961 – Ansett-ANA Flight 325, a Vickers Viscount, crashed into Botany Bay, New South Wales, killing all 15 on board.
- 22 September 1966 – Ansett-ANA Flight 149, a Vickers Viscount, crashed while preparing to make an emergency landing at Winton, Queensland, killing 24.
- 31 December 1968 – MacRobertson Miller Airlines Flight 1750, a Vickers Viscount, crashed near Port Hedland, Western Australia, killing all 26 on board.
- 21 June 1971 – Qantas Flight 755 was subject of a false bomb threat, in which the perpetrators informed authorities that they would detonate a bomb on board the Boeing 707 if the aircraft descended below 20000 ft. The aircraft circled for over 6 hours, but Qantas eventually conceded to the hoax amidst dwindling fuel supply on board the aircraft.
- 15 November 1972 – Ansett Australia Flight 232, a Fokker F27, was hijacked en route to Alice Springs Airport. The aircraft landed safely, and the hijacker committed suicide outside the aircraft after being injured by police.
- 23 October 1975 – Connair Flight 1263, a De Havilland Heron, crashed on approach to Cairns Airport, killing all 11 on board.
- 21 February 1980 – Advance Airlines Flight 4210, a Beech Super King Air, crashed after take-off from Sydney Airport, killing all 13 on board.
- 24 April 1994 – a DC-3 of South Pacific Airmotive ditched into Botany Bay after suffering engine failure on departure from Sydney Airport. No fatalities occurred.
- 31 May 2000 – Whyalla Airlines Flight 904, a Piper Navajo, attempted to ditch into the Spencer Gulf after suffering a dual engine failure. All 8 on board were killed.
- 29 May 2003 – QantasLink Flight 1737, a Boeing 717, suffered an attempted hijacking 10 minutes after departure from Melbourne. The hijacker non-fatally stabbed two flight attendants, but was eventually restrained and the aircraft returned to Melbourne. 4 people in total suffered injuries.
- 7 May 2005 – Aero-Tropics Air Services Flight 675, a Fairchild Metro, crashed on approach to Lockhart River Airport, killing all 15 on board.
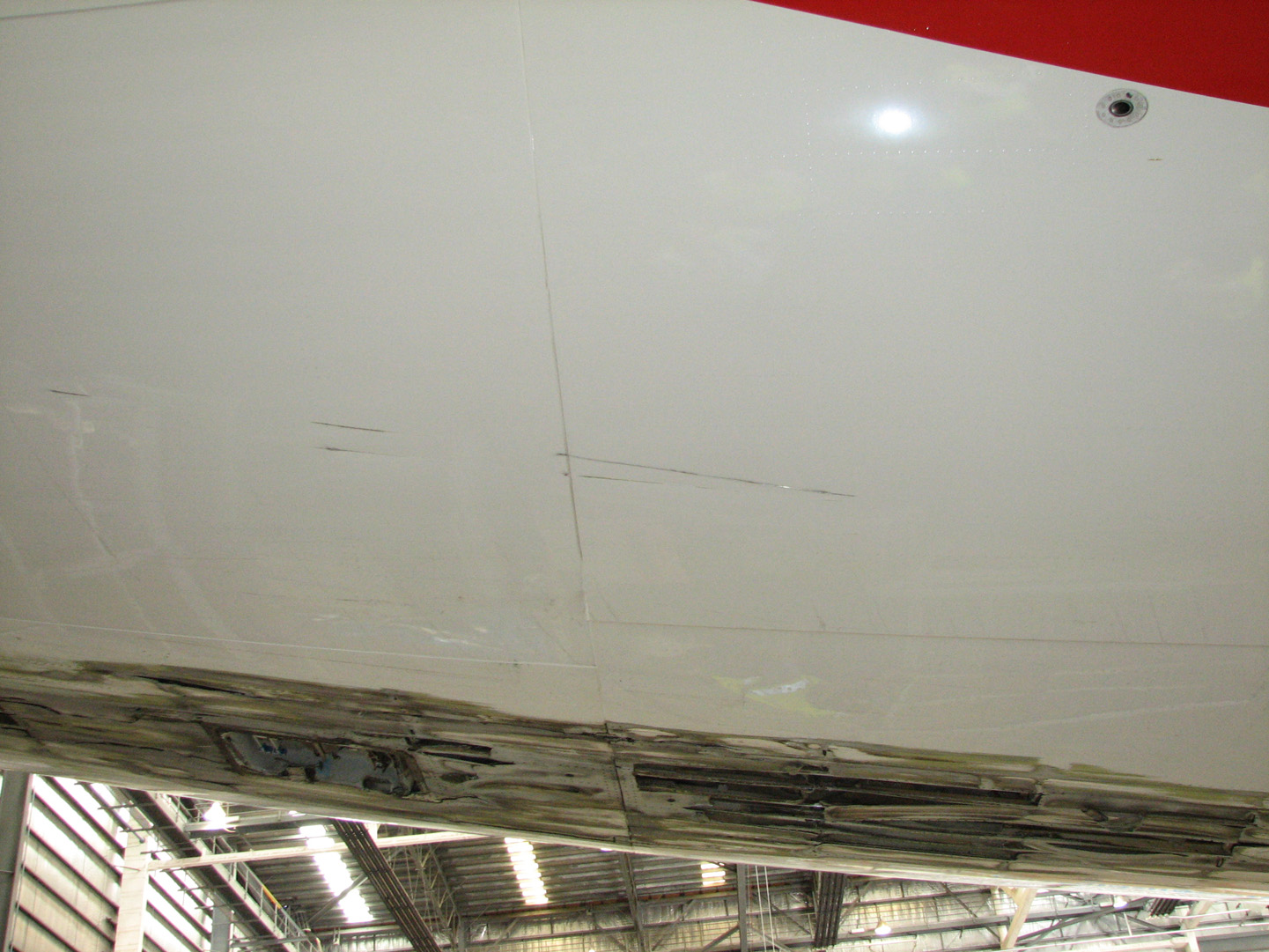
  Damage to Emirates Flight 407
- 20 March 2009 – Emirates Flight 407, an Airbus A340-500, overran the runway on takeoff from Melbourne Airport. The aircraft struck multiple structures before eventually gaining altitude. The aircraft made a safe return to Melbourne.
- 31 December 2017 – a DHC-2 of Sydney Seaplanes lost control and crashed off Cowan Creek, after the pilot had become incapacitated. All 6 on board were killed, including British businessman Richard Cousins.

=== Federated states of Micronesia ===
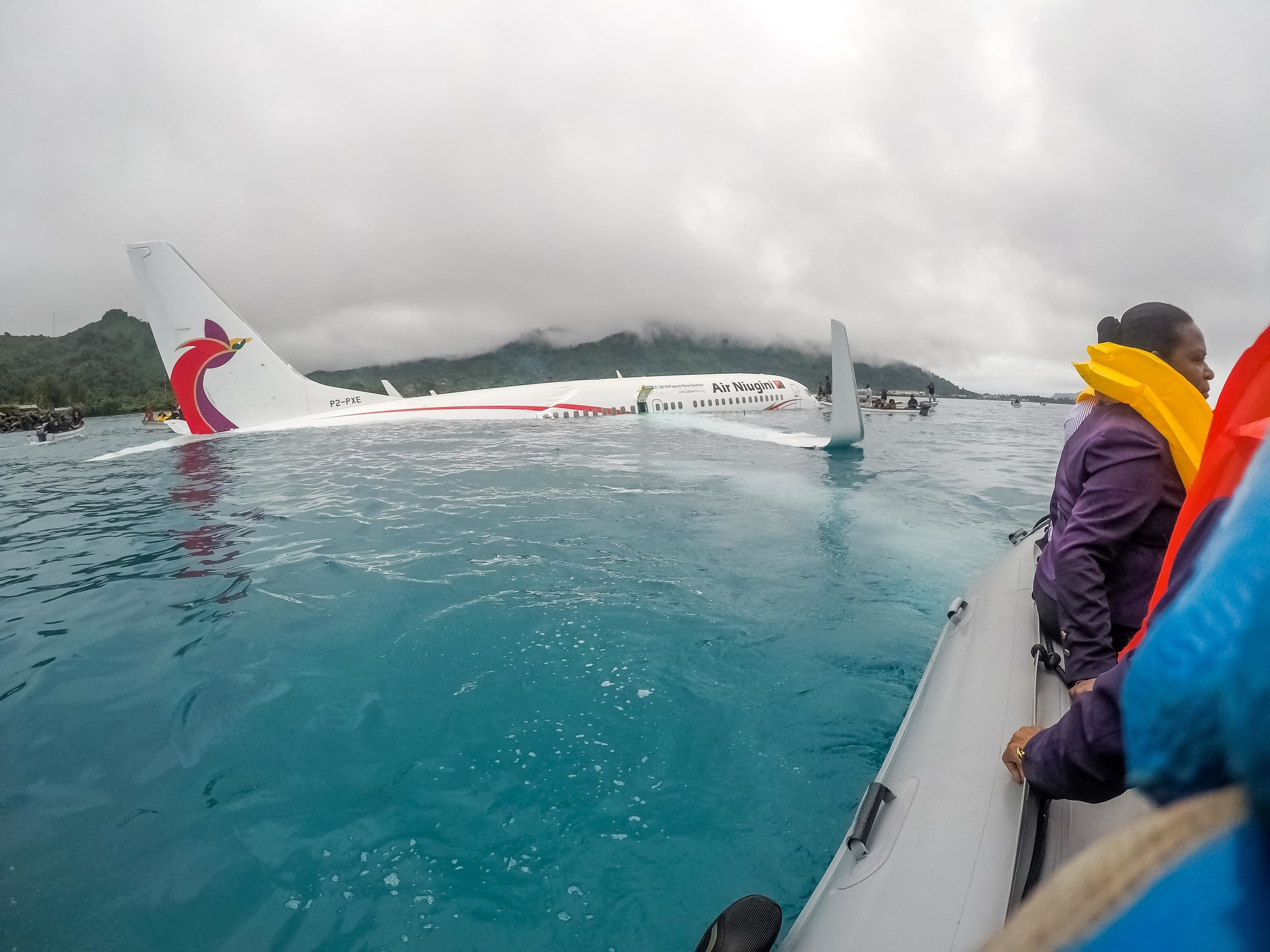
Air Niugini Flight 73

- 18 September 2018 – **Air Niugini Flight 73**, a Boeing 737-800, crashed into the water short of Chuuk International Airport. One passenger was killed.

=== Fiji ===
- 19 May 1987 – Air New Zealand Flight 24, a Boeing 747, was hijacked on the ground at Nadi Airport. The hijacker was overpowered and nobody was injured.
- 24 July 1999 – **Air Fiji Flight 121**, an Embraer EMB 110 crashed into the mountainside due to pilot error, killing all 17 on board

=== French Polynesia ===
- 22 July 1973 – **Pan Am Flight 816**, a Boeing 707, crashed into the sea on climbout from Faa'a Airport, killing 78 people on board. The cause was never determined.
- 18 April 1991 – Air Tahiti Flight 805, a Dornier 228, ditched off the coast of Nuku Hiva, killing 10 of the 22 on board.
- 9 August 2007 – Air Moorea Flight 1121, a Twin Otter, crashed into the sea due to an elevator cable failure killing all 20 on board.

=== New Zealand ===
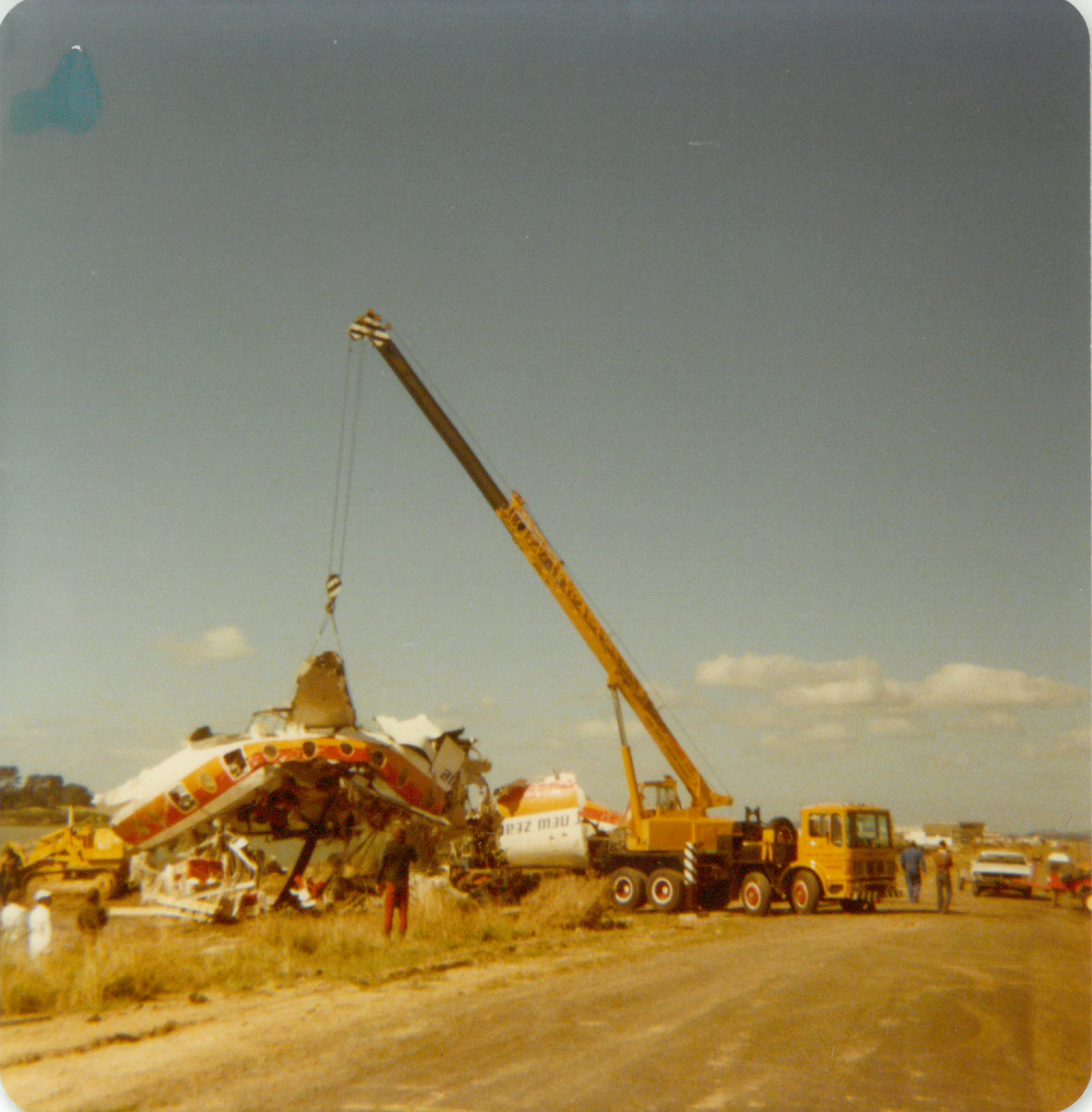
Recovery of Air New Zealand Flight 4374 from the harbour it crashed in, in Mangere, Auckland

- 3 July 1963 – **New Zealand National Airways Corporation Flight 441**, a DC-3, crashed in the Kaimai Ranges, killing all 23 people on board.
- 4 July 1966 – an Air New Zealand training flight of a DC-8 crashed on takeoff from Auckland Airport after the reverse thrust was inadvertently deployed. 2 of the 5 on board were killed.
- 17 February 1979 – Air New Zealand Flight 4374, a Fokker F27, crashed on approach to Auckland Airport from Gisborne Airport on 17 February 1979, killing 2 out of the 4 people on board.
- 5 June 1995 – Ansett New Zealand Flight 703, a Dash 8, crashed on approach to Palmerston North, killing 4 of 21 people on board.
- 3 May 2005 – Airwork Flight 23, a Fairchild Metro, lost control and crashed in Stratford, killing both pilots.
- 18 June 2007 – Eagle Airways Flight 2300, a Beechcraft 1900, made an emergency belly landing at Woodbourne Airport after a hydraulic failure meant the landing gear could not be extended. None of the 17 occupants were harmed.
- 8 February 2008 – Eagle Airways Flight 2279 suffered an attempted hijacking on a flight from Blenheim to Christchurch. 3 injuries occurred.

=== Papua New Guinea ===
- 16 July 1951 – Qantas Flight LW, a de Havilland Australia DHA-3 Drover, lost control and crashed into the Huon Gulf, killing all 7 on board.
- 11 August 2009 – Airlines PNG Flight 4684, a Twin Otter, crashed into the eastern slope of the Kokoda Gap. All 13 on board killed.
- 13 October 2011 – **Airlines PNG Flight 1600** a de Havilland Canada Dash 8, was en route to Madang Airport when one of its propellers entered overspeed, causing a catastrophic engine failure. The pilots attempted a forced landing near the Guabe River. The aircraft crashed, killing 28 of the 32 on board.

=== Vanuatu ===
- 28 July 2018 – Air Vanuatu Flight 241, an ATR 72, made an emergency landing at Bauerfield International Airport after suffering an engine fire. On landing, the aircraft ran off the runway and collided with 2 parked Britten-Norman Islanders. 13 people were injured.

== North America ==
=== Canada ===
- 30 October 1941 – American Airlines Flight 1, a Douglas DC-3, crashed in Southwold, Ontario, killing all 20 on board.
- 9 September 1949 – Canadian Pacific Air Lines Flight 108, a DC-3, was bombed over Cap Tourmente, Quebec, killing all 23 on board.
- 8 April 1954 – Trans-Canada Air Lines Flight 9, a Canadair North Star, collided in mid-air with a Royal Canadian Air Force North American T-6 Texan above Moose Jaw. All 36 on both aircraft were killed as well as 1 on the ground.
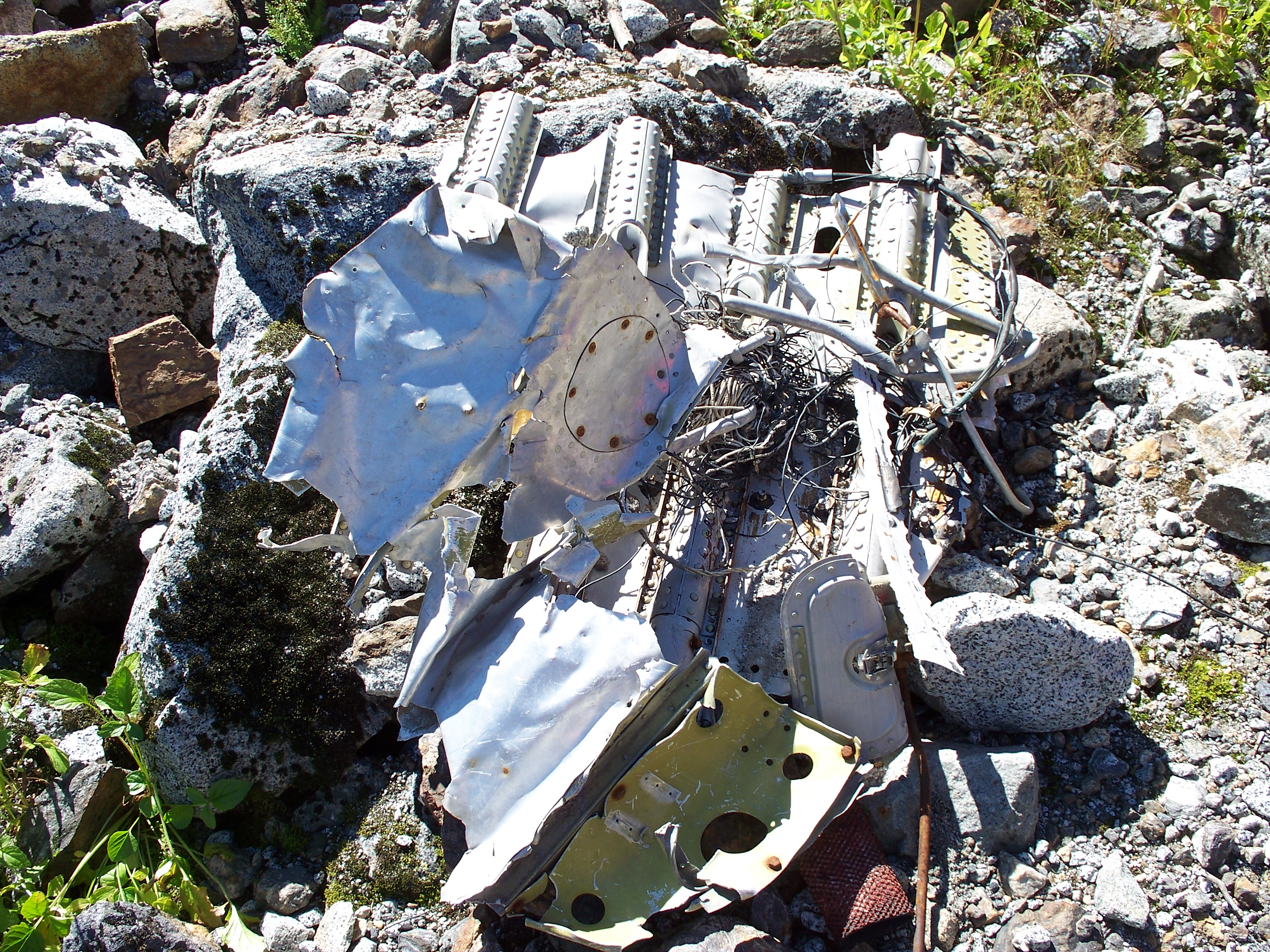
  Trans-Canada Air Lines Flight 810
- 9 December 1956 – Trans-Canada Air Lines Flight 810, a Canadair North Star, crashed into Mount Slesse near Chilliwack, British Columbia on 9 December 1956 after encountering severe icing and turbulence, resulting in the death of all 62 people on board.
- 29 November 1963 – Trans-Canada Air Lines Flight 831, a Douglas DC-8-54CF, crashed into a soggy field, killing all 118 on board.
- 8 July 1965 – Canadian Pacific Airlines Flight 21, a DC-6, crashed near 100 Mile House, British Columbia, after an in-flight explosion. All 52 aboard were killed.
- 5 September 1967 – ČSA Flight 523, an Ilyushin Il-18, crashed on takeoff at Gander Airport, killing 35.
- 5 July 1970 – Air Canada Flight 621, a Douglas DC-8-60, initiated a go-around after a hard touchdown at Toronto International Airport. The landing attempt had ruptured the fuel tank, and the right wing exploded in flight, causing the plane to crash near Brampton. All 109 people on board were killed.
- 12 June 1972 – American Airlines Flight 96, a McDonnell Douglas DC-10, suffered a cargo door blowout above Windsor, Ontario. The aircraft made a successful return to Detroit Metropolitan Airport with no fatalities.
- 30 October 1974 – Panarctic Oils Flight 416, a Lockheed L-188 Electra, crashed into the Byam Channel, killing 32 of the 34 on board.
- 11 February 1978 – Pacific Western Airlines Flight 314, a Boeing 737-200, crashed after thrust reversers did not fully stow following a rejected landing that was executed in order to avoid a snowplow. The crash killed four crew members and 38 of the 44 passengers.
- 26 June 1978 – Air Canada Flight 189, a DC-9-32, crashed on takeoff in Toronto due to pilot error and mechanical failure. Two passengers were killed.
- 29 March 1979 – Quebecair Flight 255, a Fairchild F-27, crashed into a hill due to engine separation, killing 17.

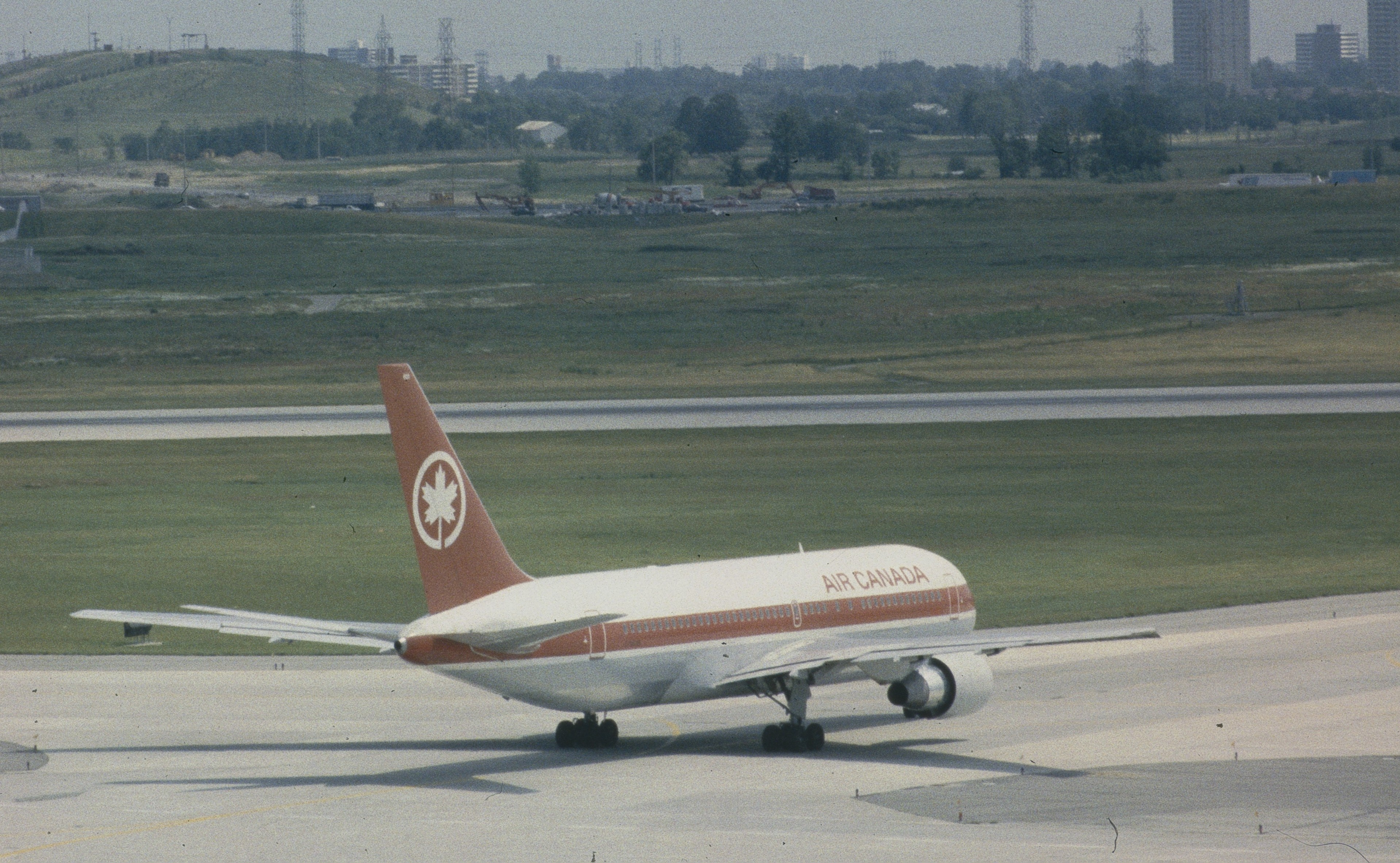
The Gimli Glider, known for the pilot's heroic action to glide when the plane encountered fuel exhaustion, which saves everyone on board

.

- 23 July 1983 – Air Canada Flight 143, (commonly known as the Gimli Glider), a Boeing 767, ran out of fuel over the Canadian Shield due to a maintenance error, and had to glide to a landing at a former airbase at Gimli, Manitoba. 10 people were injured during the evacuation.
- 22 March 1984 – Pacific Western Airlines Flight 501, a Boeing 737-200, burst into flames upon takeoff from Calgary International Airport due to mechanical failure. No one was killed.
- 19 October 1984 – Wapiti Aviation Flight 402, a Piper PA-31, crashed into a remote forest north of High Prairie, killing 6 of the 10 people on board.
- 12 December 1985 – **Arrow Air Flight 1285**, a Douglas DC-8-63, crashed shortly after takeoff due to icing at Gander International Airport. All 256 aboard died.
- 10 March 1989 – Air Ontario Flight 1363, a Fokker F28, crashed soon after takeoff due to icing at Dryden Regional Airport. Of 65 people on board, 24 were killed.

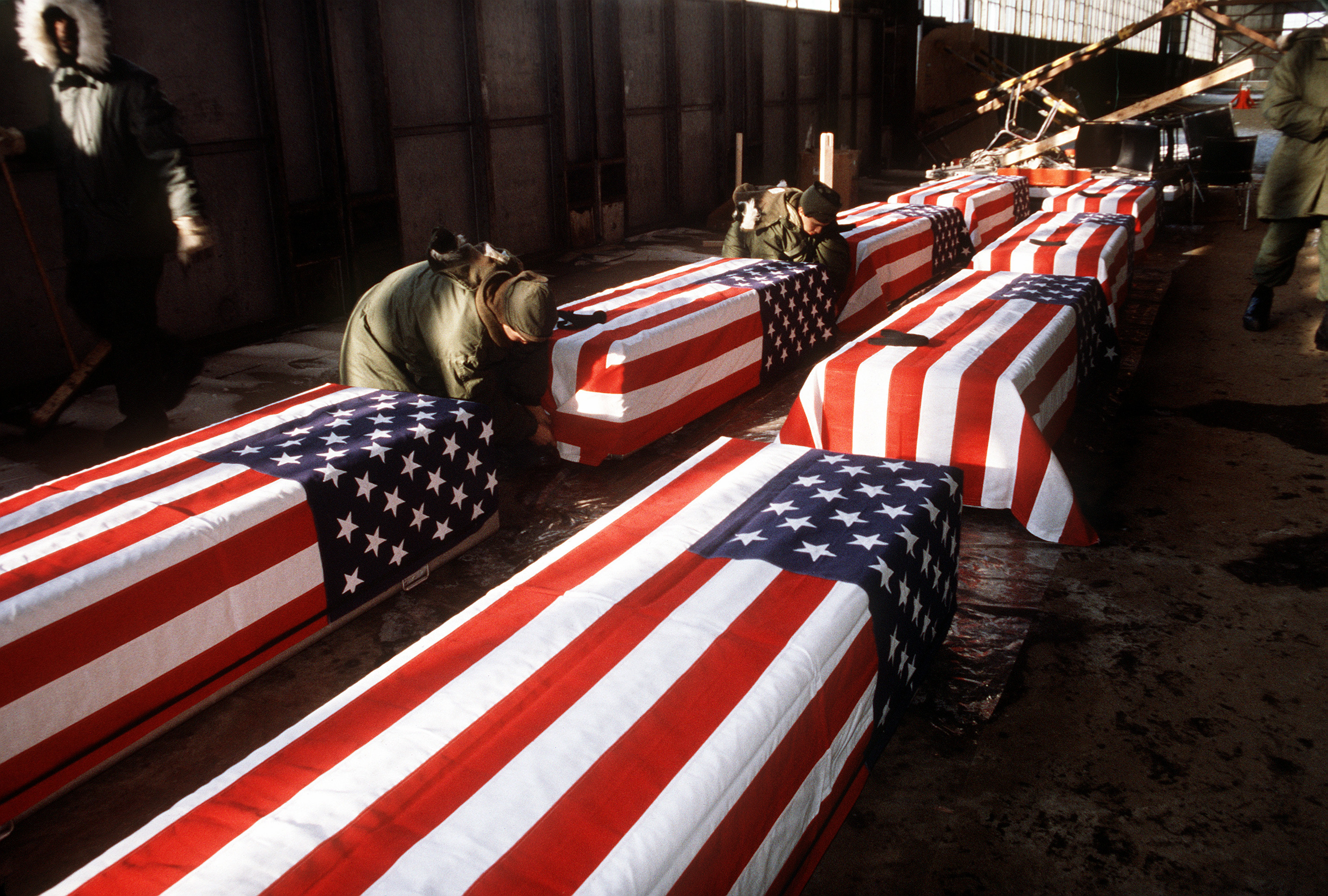
The victims of Arrow Air Flight 1285

- 16 December 1997 – Air Canada Flight 646, a Bombardier CRJ100ER, skidded off the runway and crashed into a tree while attempting to land at Fredericton International Airport in Fredericton, New Brunswick. No one was killed, but 35 of the 42 passengers and crew were injured.

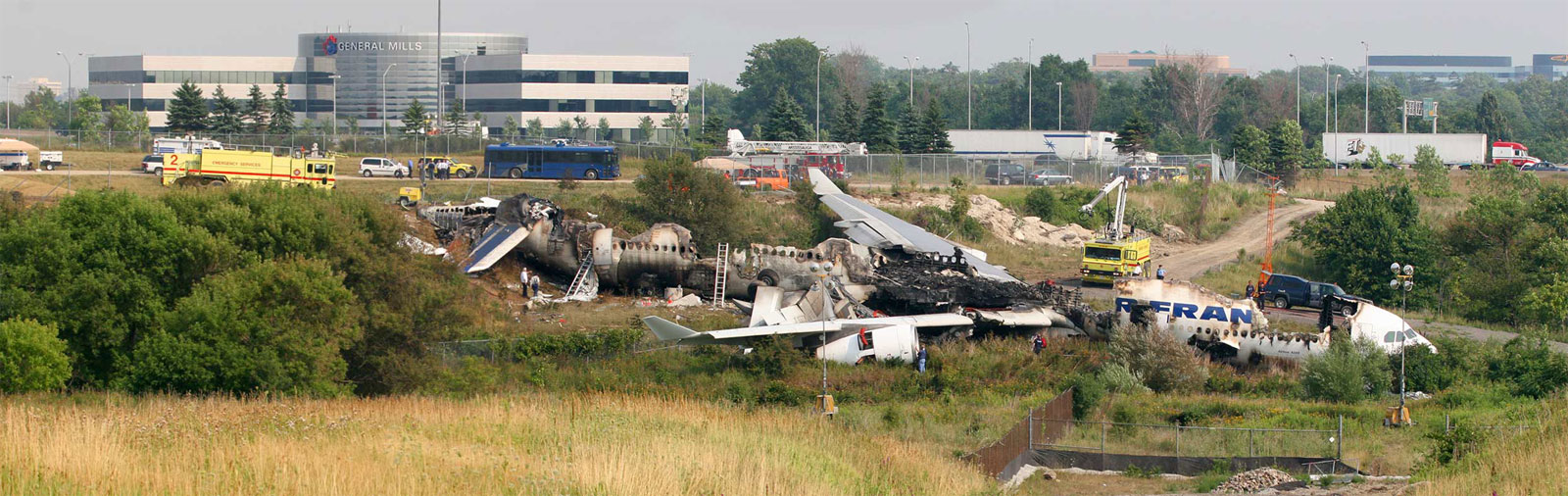
Wreckage of Air France Flight 358

- 18 June 1998 – Propair Flight 420, a Fairchild Metroliner SA226, suffered an in-flight fire due to an overheated braking system. The aircraft attempted an emergency landing at Mirabel Airport, but seconds before touch down, the left wing detached. The aircraft flipped and crashed, killing all 11 on board.
- 2 September 1998 – Swissair Flight 111, a McDonnell Douglas MD-11, crashed into the Atlantic Ocean southwest of Peggy's Cove, Nova Scotia, following an in-flight fire. All 229 people on board died.
- 11 September 2001 – amidst the September 11 attacks, Korean Air Flight 085 was suspected to have been hijacked due to a miscommunication, and was escorted to Whitehorse Airport by US fighter jets. No one was harmed.
- 14 October 2004 – MK Airlines Flight 1602, a Boeing 747-200, ran off the runway on take-off from Halifax Stanfield International Airport and crashed killing all 7 crew. The is attributed to incorrect take-off speed calculations.
- 2 August 2005 – Air France Flight 358, an Airbus A340-300, burst into flames after overshooting the runway at Toronto Pearson International Airport. There were no fatalities.
- 20 August 2011 – First Air Flight 6560, a Boeing 737-200, suffered a controlled flight into terrain in poor weather while attempting to land at Resolute, Nunavut. Of the 15 people on board, 12 were killed.
- 29 March 2015 – Air Canada Flight 624, an Airbus A320, hit an electric power line then made a hard landing as it skidded off a runway at Halifax Stanfield International Airport, Nova Scotia during a snowstorm. All 133 passengers and crew survived, but 23 suffered injuries.
- 23 January 2024 – Northwestern Air Flight 738, a BAe Jetstream 31, crashed near Fort Smith Airport, killing 6 of the 7 people on board.
- 17 February 2025 – Delta Connection Flight 4819, a Bombardier CRJ900 operated by Endeavor Air, flipped and crashed on landing at Toronto Pearson Airport. No one was killed.

=== Greenland ===
- 12 May 1962 – an Eastern Provincial Airways PBY Catalina operating on behalf of Greenlandair **sank on landing** at Godthåb Harbour, killing 15 of the 21 people on board.

=== Mexico ===
- 26 September 1949 – a Mexicana Douglas DC-3 crashed into Popocatépetl, killing all 24 on board.
- 2 June 1958 – Aeronaves de México Flight 111, a Lockheed L-749, crashed near Guadalajara, killing all 46 on board.
- 4 June 1969 – Mexicana Flight 704, a Boeing 727, collided with the Cerro del Fraile after deviating from its final approach course, killing all 79 people on board.
- 21 September 1969 – Mexicana Flight 801, a Boeing 727, crashed on final approach to Mexico City International Airport, killing 27.
- 20 June 1973 – Aeroméxico Flight 229, a Douglas DC-9-15, crashed into the side of a mountain while on approach to Licenciado Gustavo Díaz Ordaz International Airport, killing all 27 people on board.
- 31 October 1979 – Western Airlines Flight 2605, a DC-10-10, landed on a closed runway at Mexico City International Airport, hit a maintenance vehicle and crashed into a hangar, killing 73 people, including one person on the ground.
- 27 July 1981 – Aeroméxico Flight 230, a DC-9-32, touched down too hard during landing, bounced back and broke up at Chihuahua International Airport. It then caught fire, killing 32 people on board. 34 people survived.
- 8 November 1981 – Aeroméxico Flight 110, a DC-9-32, crashed near Zihuatanejo during an emergency descent, killing all 18 on board.
- 31 March 1986 – **Mexicana Flight 940**, a Boeing 727-200, suffered in-flight fire due to maintenance error, leading to loss of hydraulics and electrical systems. The aircraft crashed in the Sierra Madre Occidental, killing all 167 people on board.
- 30 July 1987 – A Belize Air International Boeing C-97G Stratofreighter crashed onto a road due to a cargo shift, killing 5 occupants and 44 on the ground.
- 9 November 1999 – TAESA Flight 725, a DC-9, stalled and crashed shortly after takeoff from Uruapan International Airport, killing all 18 people on board.
- 8 July 2000 – Aerocaribe Flight 7831, a BAe Jetstream, crashed into mountain and burst into flames near Chulum Juarez, killing all 19 people on board.
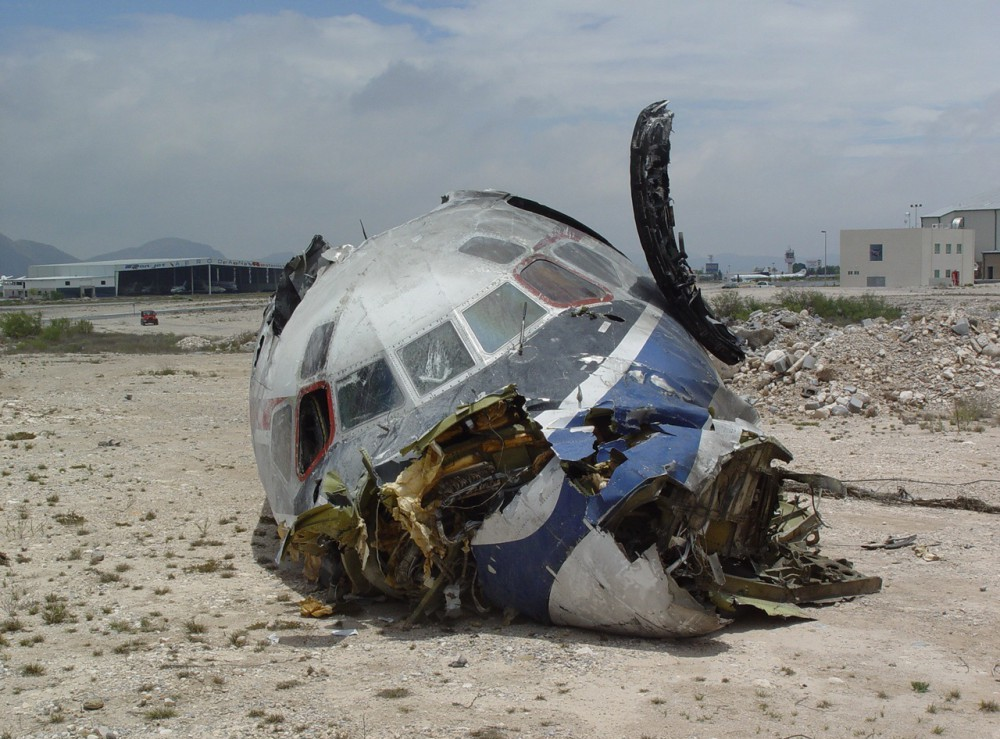
  The cockpit wreckage of USA Jet Airlines Flight 199
- 6 July 2008 – USA Jet Airlines Flight 199, a DC-9, crashed on approach to Saltillo Airport, killing one of the two pilots.
- 9 September 2009 – Aeroméxico Flight 576, a Boeing 737-852, was hijacked and flown to Mexico City. Everyone survived.
- 13 April 2010 – AeroUnion Flight 302, an Airbus A300B4-203F, stalled and crashed on approach to Monterrey International Airport, killing all 5 crew and 1 on the ground.
- 31 July 2018 – Aeroméxico Connect Flight 2431, an Embraer 190AR, crashed on takeoff from Durango International Airport due to low altitude windshear. Everyone survived.

=== United States ===
- 25 May 1979 – **American Airlines Flight 191**, a DC-10-10, suffered an engine detachment on takeoff from Chicago O'Hare Airport. The aircraft banked to the left and crashed into a field, killing all 271 on board and 2 on the ground. It is the deadliest non-terror aviation incident in the United States.
- 11 September 2001 – the **September 11 attacks** were hijackings of 4 commercial airliners, which were flown into the World Trade Center and The Pentagon. A total of 2977 victims were killed, including all on board each aircraft.
  - American Airlines Flight 11, a Boeing 767, was flown into the North Tower of the World Trade Center.
  - United Airlines Flight 175, a Boeing 767, was flown into the South Tower of the World Trade Center.
  - American Airlines Flight 77, a Boeing 757, was flown into The Pentagon.
  - United Airlines Flight 93, a Boeing 757, crashed into a field after passengers revolted against the hijackers. The target was believed to have been either the White House or the United States Capitol.

== South America ==
=== Argentina ===
- 2 August 1947 – an Avro Lancastrian of British South American Airways crashed into Mount Tupungato, killing all 11 on board.
- 8 December 1957 – Aerolíneas Argentinas Flight 670, a DC-4, suffered a structural failure in severe turbulence and crashed near San Carlos de Bolívar, killing all 61 on board.
- 16 January 1959 – Austral Líneas Aéreas Flight 205, a Curtiss C-46, stalled and crashed into the sea on approach to Mar del Plata, killing 51 of the 52 on board.
- 19 July 1961 – **Aerolíneas Argentinas Flight 644**, a DC-6, encountered severe turbulence and crashed near Pardo, Buenos Aires. All 67 on board were killed.
- 28 September 1966 – Aerolíneas Argentinas Flight 648, a DC-4, was hijacked during a domestic flight within Argentina by a group of Argentine nationals, who demanded the plane fly to the Falkland Islands. They surrendered the following day and nobody was harmed.
- 4 February 1970 – Aerolíneas Argentinas Flight 707, a Hawker Siddeley HS 748, entered severe turbulence while en route on its third leg between Camba Puntá Airport and Islas Malvinas International Airport. The pilots lost control of the aircraft and crashed into terrain near Loma Alta, killing all 37 on board.
- 21 November 1977 – Austral Líneas Aéreas Flight 9, a BAC 1-11, crashed into a mountain while attempting to approach Bariloche Airport, killing 46 of the 79 people on board.
- 7 May 1981 – Austral Líneas Aéreas Flight 901, a BAC 1-11, was cleared to land at Aeroparque Jorge Newbery in Buenos Aires when it suddenly lost control and crashed into the river, killing all 31 on board.
- 12 June 1988 – Austral Líneas Aéreas Flight 46 a McDonnell Douglas MD-81, clipped a tree and crashed 3 km short of the runway while on approach to Libertador General Jose de San Martin Airport, killing all 22 people on board.
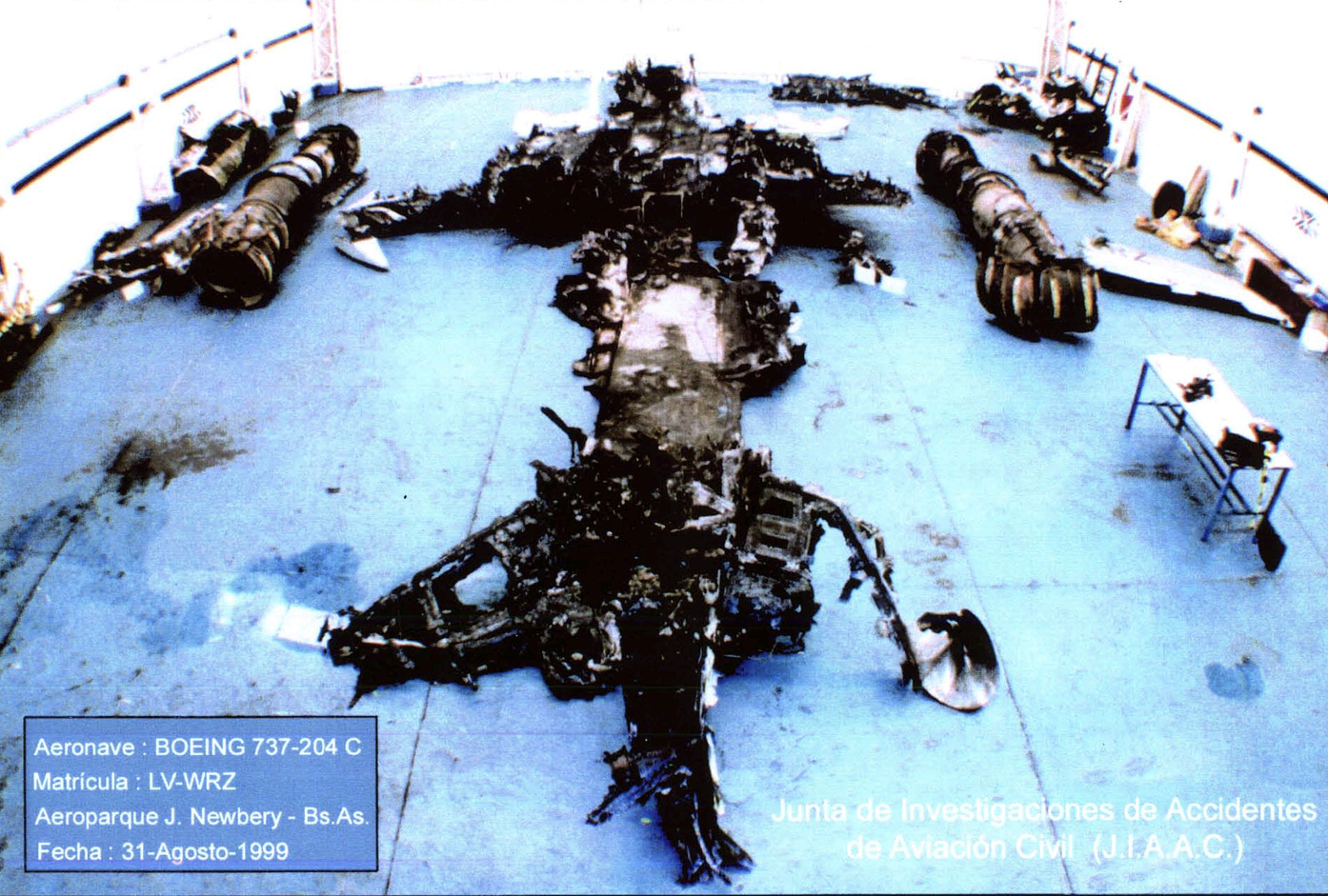
  Reconstructed wreckage of LAPA Flight 3142
- 31 August 1999 – LAPA Flight 3142, a Boeing 737-200, overran the runway on takeoff at Aeroparque Jorge Newbery, after the pilots failed to extend the flaps. 63 people were killed.
- 18 May 2011 – Sol Líneas Aéreas Flight 5428, a Saab 340, lost control and crashed at Prahuaniyeu, Río Negro due to atmospheric icing. All 22 on board were killed.

=== Bolivia ===
- 5 February 1960 – a Lloyd Aéreo Boliviano DC-4 crashed shortly after takeoff from Cochabamba, killing all 59 people on board.
- 26 September 1969 – a Lloyd Aéreo Boliviano DC-6 crashed into Chuqi Tanka, killing all 74 people on board.
- 27 October 1975 – a Convair CV-440 of Transporte Aéreo Militar crashed in Caranavi after probable overloading, killing all 67 on board.
- 13 October 1976 – a Lloyd Aéreo Boliviano Boeing 707 freighter **crashed** during takeoff from El Trompillo Airport, due to an engine failure. All 3 crew members and 88 people on the ground were killed.
- 1 January 1985 – Eastern Air Lines Flight 980, a Boeing 727, crashed into Mount Illimani, killing all 29 people on board.
- 1 February 2008 – Lloyd Aéreo Boliviano Flight 301, a Boeing 727, made a forced landing near Trinidad Teniente Jorge Henrich Arauz Airport after suffering likely fuel exhaustion. No fatalities occurred.
- 6 September 2011 – Aerocon Flight 238, a Swearingen Metro, crashed on approach to Teniente Jorge Henrich Arauz Airport, killing 8 of the 9 on board.
- 3 November 2013 – Aerocon Flight 25, a Swearingen Metro, crashed on landing at Riberalta Airport after encountering wind shear. 8 of the 18 on board were killed.

=== Brazil ===
- 13 August 1939 – a Pan Am Sikorsky S-43 lost control and crashed into Guanabara Bay, Rio de Janeiro following an engine failure. 14 of the 16 people on board were killed.
- 19 April 1952 – Pan Am Flight 202, a Boeing 377, suffered an in-flight break up over the Amazon Basin, killing all 50 on board.
- 12 August 1952 – a Douglas C-47 operated by Transportes Aéreos Nacionales suffered an in-flight fire and crashed in Palmeiras de Goiás, killing all 24 on board.
- 16 June 1958 – Serviços Aéreos Cruzeiro do Sul Flight 412, a Convair CV-440, crashed on approach to Curitiba Airport, killing 21 of the 26 on board.
- 5 September 1958 – Lóide Aéreo Nacional Flight 652, a Curtiss C-46, crashed on approach to Campina Grande Airport, killing 13 of the 40 people on board.
- 11 January 1959 – Lufthansa Flight 502, a Lockheed L-1049G Super Constellation, was on approach to Rio de Janeiro when its nose wheel struck the water. The plane crashed near Flecheiras Beach. 36 people were killed; only 3 crew members survived.
- 22 December 1959 – VASP Flight 233, a Vickers Viscount, collided in mid-air with a Brazilian Air Force Fokker S-11 while on approach to Rio de Janeiro/Galeão International Airport. The Viscount crashed into a residential area, killing all 32 on board and 10 on the ground. The pilot of the Fokker ejected and survived.
- 25 February 1960 – the 1960 Rio de Janeiro mid-air collision occurred when a United States Navy Douglas DC-6 collided in the air over Guanabara Bay with a Real Transportes Aéreos Douglas DC-3. 61 fatalities occurred; only 3 people survived, all of whom were on the United States Navy's aircraft.
- 24 June 1960 – Real Transportes Aéreos Flight 435, a Convair 340, crashed into the Guanabara Bay in unknown circumstances. All 54 occupants were killed.
- 23 November 1961 – Aerolíneas Argentinas Flight 322, a De Havilland Comet, clipped several tree tops and crashed into terrain during climbout from Campinas Viracopos Airport, killing all 52 people on board.
- 14 December 1962 – a Panair do Brasil Lockheed Constellation crashed near Rio Preto da Eva for unknown reasons. All 50 on board were killed.
- 26 July 1979 – Lufthansa Cargo Flight 527, a Boeing 707, crashed into terrain shortly after departing from Rio de Janeiro. All 3 crew members were killed.
- 12 April 1980 – Transbrasil Flight 303, a Boeing 727, cashed into a hill during approach to Florianópolis, Brazil. 55 were killed, leaving 3 survivors.
- 25 May 1982 – VASP Flight 234, a Boeing 737-200, skidded off the runway at Brasília International Airport, killing 2.
- 8 June 1982 – VASP Flight 168, a Boeing 727, crashed into the Aratanha mountains in Ceará, northeast Brazil. All 137 people on board were killed.
- 12 June 1982 – a TABA Fairchild F-27 crashed on approach to Tabatinga International Airport, killing all 44 people on board.
- 3 February 1984 – Serviços Aéreos Cruzeiro do Sul Flight 302, an Airbus A300, was hijacked during a domestic flight between São Luís and Belém, and flown to Havana, Cuba. No casualties occurred.
- 28 June 1984 – a TAM Embraer EMB 110 crashed into São João Hill in São Pedro da Aldeia. All 18 people on board were killed.
- 28 January 1986 – VASP Flight 210, a Boeing 737-200, mistakenly attempted to take off on a taxiway at São Paulo/Guarulhos International Airport. The aircraft overran the tarmac and crashed into an embankment, killing 1 passenger.
- 29 September 1988 – VASP Flight 375, a Boeing 737, was hijacked over Minas Gerais. The hijacker shot and killed the first officer and initially planned to crash the plane into Planalto Palace, but eventually landed the plane at Goiânia International Airport. Negotiations occurred for several hours before the hijacker was shot multiple times by police. He died 2 days later, reportedly unrelated to the gunshots. No further fatalities occurred.
- 21 March 1989 – Transbrasil Flight 801, a Boeing 707, stalled and crashed into a densely populated area on approach to São Paulo/Guarulhos International Airport. All 3 pilots and 22 people on the ground were killed.
- 3 September 1989 – Varig Flight 254, a Boeing 737, crashed into a jungle near Sao Jose do Xingu into the Cachimbo mountains. The pilots had inadvertently flown south from their departure airport of Marabá, instead of north to their destination in Belém. The aircraft ran out of fuel and crashed. 12 people were killed, and the 42 survivors were rescued 2 days after the crash.
- 22 June 1992 – VASP Cargo Flight 780, a Boeing 737-200, crashed on approach to Cruzeiro do Sul International Airport, killing all 3 crew members.

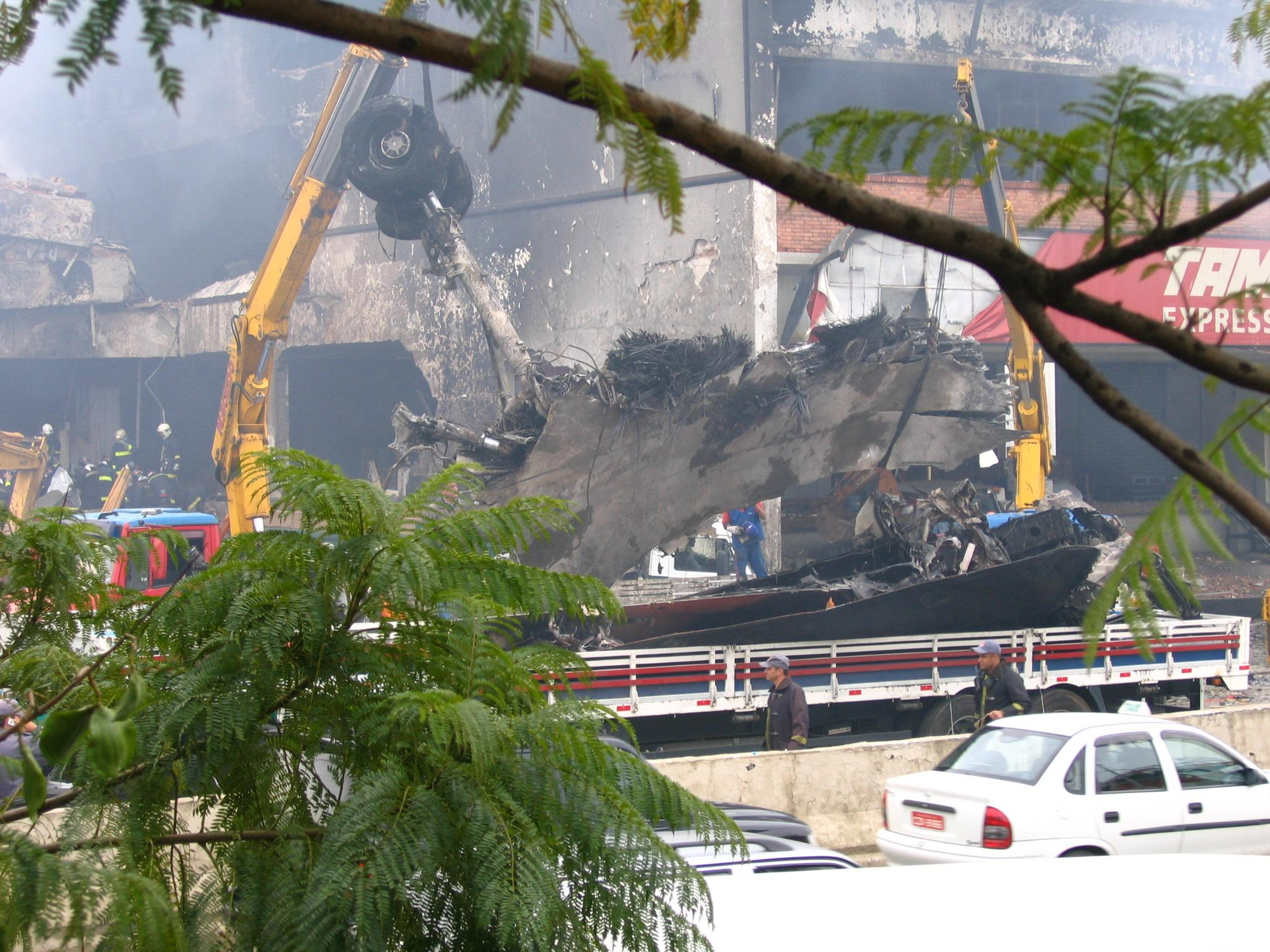
Landing gear of TAM Airlines Flight 3054

- 31 October 1996 – TAM Transportes Aéreos Regionais Flight 402, a Fokker 100, crashed near the airport of Congonhas in São Paulo, after the thrust reverser on the number 2 engine deployed on climbout. All 95 on board were killed as well as 4 on the ground.
- 15 September 2001 – TAM Airlines Flight 9755, a Fokker 100, suffered an uncontained engine failure in the skies near Belo Horizonte. Debris from the engine shattered 3 passenger windows, partially ejecting a passenger from the aircraft. The pilots made an emergency landing at Confins Airport. The ejected passenger did not survive.
- 30 August 2002 – Rico Linhas Aéreas Flight 4823, an EMB 120, crashed on approach to Rio Branco International Airport in bad weather. 23 of the 31 passengers and crew were killed.
- 14 September 2002 – Total Linhas Aéreas Flight 5561, an ATR 42 freighter, lost control and crashed near Paranapanema, killing both pilots.
- 14 May 2004 – Rico Linhas Aéreas Flight 4815, an EMB 120, crashed into the Amazon rainforest on approach to Manaus Airport, killing all 33 on board.
- 31 March 2006 – TEAM Linhas Aéreas Flight 6865, a Let L-410, crashed into Pico da Pedra Bonita on approach to Macaé Airport, killing all 19 on board.

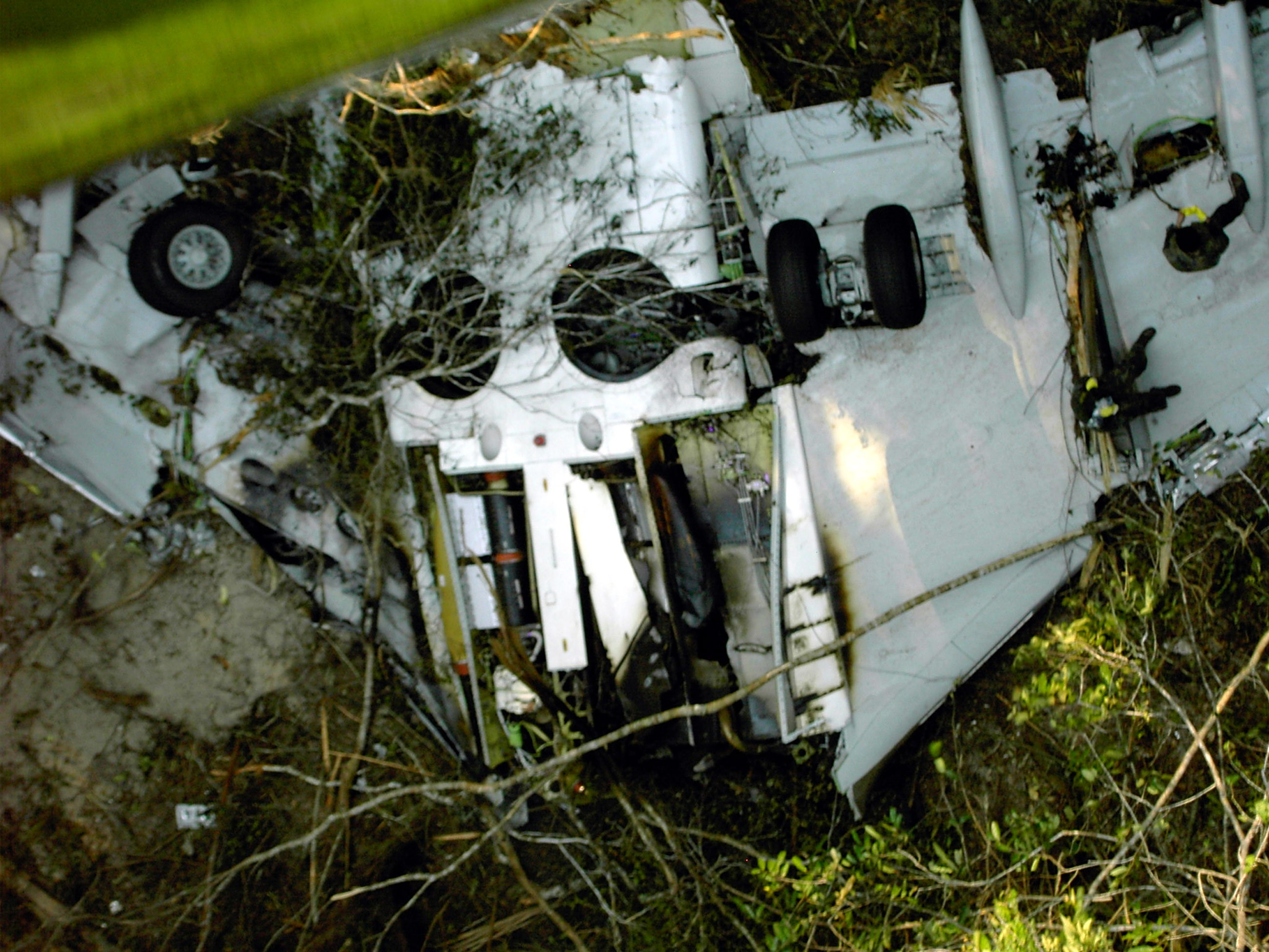
Wreckage of GOL Transportes Aereos Flight 1907

- 29 September 2006 – Gol Transportes Aéreos Flight 1907, a Boeing 737-800, collided in mid-air with an ExcelAire Embraer Legacy 600 above the Amazon rainforest east of Peixoto de Azevedo. The winglet of the Embraer sliced the wing of the Boeing, causing it to spiral out of control, break up in mid-air and crash into the forest, killing all 154 on board. The Embraer made an emergency landing at Cachimbo Airport with no fatalities to its occupants. The accident triggered a nationwide aviation crisis, worsened by the crash of TAM Flight 3054 the following year.
- 17 July 2007 – **TAM Airlines Flight 3054**, an Airbus A320, overran the runway at São Paulo–Congonhas Airport, while attempting to land with an inoperative thrust reverser in poor weather. The aircraft crashed into a TAM Express warehouse and exploded, killing all 187 on board and 12 on the ground.
- 7 February 2009 – an overloaded Embraer EMB 110 operated by Manaus Aerotáxi crashed into the Manacapuru River while attempting an emergency diversion to an abandoned runway in Manacapuru. 24 of the 28 people on board were killed.
- 13 July 2011 – Noar Linhas Aéreas Flight 4896, a Let L-410, crashed following an engine failure on climbout from Recife. All 16 on board were killed.
- 9 August 2024 – Voepass Linhas Aéreas Flight 2283, an ATR 72-500, crashed in Vinhedo, São Paulo in an apparent flat spin while en route to Guarulhos International Airport. None of the 62 occupants survived.
- 9 November 2024 – Total Linhas Aéreas Flight 5682, a Boeing 737-400SF, suffered an in-flight fire en route to São Paulo. The aircraft made an emergency landing at Guarulhos Airport, and both pilots evacuated the aircraft before it was destroyed by fire.

=== Chile ===
- 3 April 1961 – LAN Chile Flight 210, a DC-3, crashed into the Andes for unknown reasons. All 24 on board were killed. While the tail and some human remains were found in 1961, the fuselage was not discovered until 2015.
- 6 February 1965 – **LAN Chile Flight 107**, a Douglas DC-6, crashed into the side of La Corona Mountain in the Andes, near San José volcano. All 88 occupants were killed.
- 28 April 1969 – LAN Chile Flight 160, a Boeing 727, crashed into a farm near Colina. All 60 people on board survived.
- 9 December 1982 – Aeronor Flight 304, a Fairchild F-27, suffered an engine malfunction and crashed into a stone wall near La Florida Airport, La Serena, killing all 46 people on board.
- 20 February 1991 – LAN Chile Flight 1069, a BAe 146, overran the runway at Puerto Williams Airport and crashed into the Beagle Channel. 20 of the 72 on board were killed.

=== Colombia ===
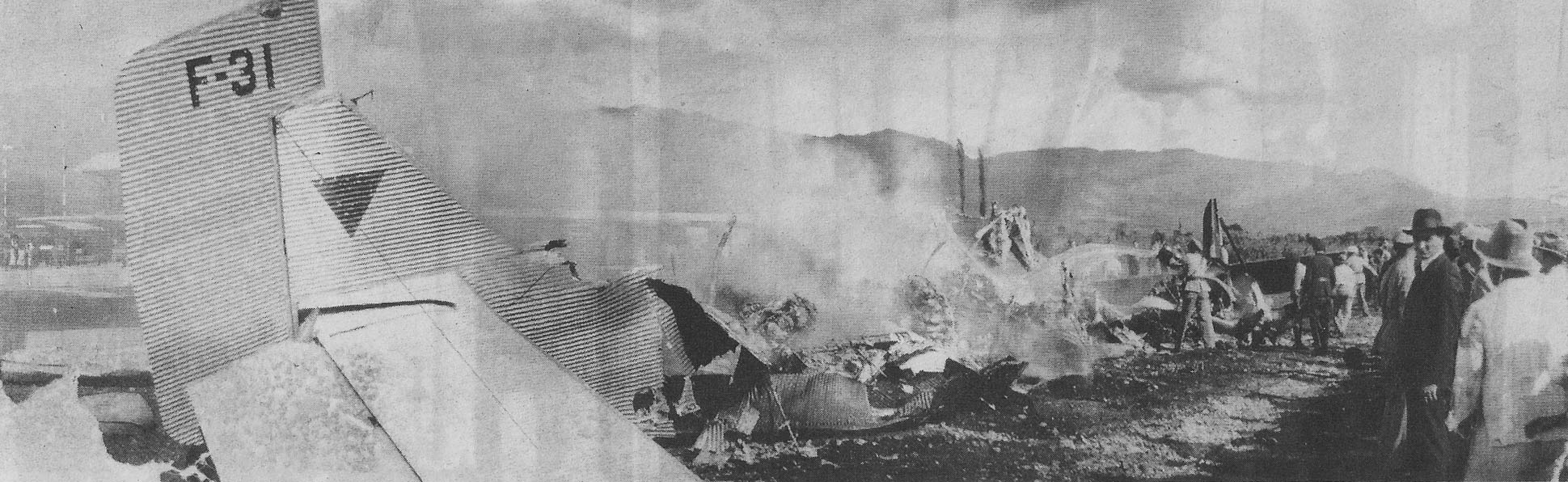
Medellin runway collision

- 24 June 1935 – the Medellín Airport runway collision occurred between two Ford Trimotors operated by SACO and SCADTA. The SACO aircraft lost control on takeoff, exited the runway, and collided with the SCADTA aircraft, which was taxiing at the time. 17 fatalities occurred across both aircraft, including musicians Carlos Gardel, Alfredo Le Pera, and Guillermo Barbieri.
- 15 February 1947 – an Avianca DC-4 crashed into Mount El Tablazo near Bogotá, killing all 53 people on board.
- 14 January 1966 – Avianca Flight 03, a Douglas C-54, was taking off from Bogotá when it stalled and crashed into the sea. 56 people were killed, leaving 8 survivors.
- 29 July 1971 – the Palomas mid-air collision occurred when two DC-3s, Avianca Flight 630 and Avianca Flight 626, collided near Mámbita. All 38 on both aircraft were killed.
- 27 August 1973 – an Aerocóndor Colombia Lockheed L-188 crashed into a mountain after departing from Bogotá, killing all 42 on board.
- 15 January 1976 – a DC-4 operated by Taxi Aereo el Venado crashed into the Cordillera Occidental, killing all 13 on board.
- 21 December 1980 – a Sud Aviation Caravelle operated by TAC crashed near Riohacha following an in flight explosion, killing all 70 occupants. The cause of the explosion was never determined.
- 26 August 1981 – Aeropesca Flight 221, a Vickers Viscount, crashed into Mount Santa Elana in the Colombian Andes, killing all 50 people on board.
- 26 March 1982 – Aeropesca Flight 217, a Vickers Viscount carrying 21 people, crashed into a mountain near Quetame. All aboard were killed.
- 14 December 1983 – a TAMPA Boeing 707 operating a ferry flight crashed following an engine failure after takeoff from Olaya Herrera Airport in Medellín. All 3 pilots and 22 people on the ground were killed.
- 17 March 1988 – Avianca Flight 410, a Boeing 727, crashed into a mountain in Cúcuta shortly after takeoff. All 143 passengers and crew were killed.
- 27 November 1989 – Avianca Flight 203, a Boeing 727, was destroyed by bomb as part of an assassination attempt while flying over Soacha. All 107 people on board were killed, as well as 3 on the ground.
- 19 May 1993 – SAM Colombia Flight 501, a Boeing 727, hit Mt. Paramo de Frontino at 12,300 ft. while on approach to José María Córdova International Airport, killing all 132 people on board. The VHF omnidirectional range/distance measuring equipment had been sabotaged by terrorists and was not in service.
- 11 January 1995 – Intercontinental de Aviación Flight 256, a Douglas DC-9 crashed into a marshy lagoon near María La Baja, 56 km from Cartagena Airport, due to a false altimeter setting. 51 people were killed. The only survivor was a 9-year-old girl who apparently fell out before the aircraft caught fire.
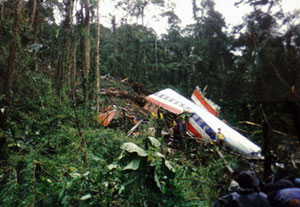
  American Airlines Flight 965
- 20 December 1995 – **American Airlines Flight 965**, a Boeing 757-200, strayed off course and crashed into a mountain in Buga, killing 159 and leaving 4 survivors.
- 20 April 1998 – Air France Flight 422, a Boeing 727 operated by TAME, crashed into the mountains east of Bogotá, Colombia shortly after takeoff, killing all 53 people on board.
- 12 April 1999 – Avianca Flight 9463, a Fokker 50, was hijacked and forcibly flown to a remote landing strip in the district of Vijagual. The occupants were taken hostage and transferred to a camp, and were gradually released over the next 7 months. 1 person died during the ordeal.
- 28 January 2002 – TAME Flight 120, a Boeing 727-134, was on approach to Teniente Coronel Luis a Mantilla International Airport in foggy conditions, when it crashed into the side of Cumbal Volcano, killing all 94 people on board. Colombian authorities concluded that pilot error was the cause of the accident.
- 26 March 2005 – West Caribbean Airways flight 9955, a Let L-410 Turbolet, crashed soon after takeoff from El Embrujo Airport on 26 March 2005, following a stall due to EFTO and pilot error. 9 of the 14 on board died.
- 7 July 2008 – Centurion Air Cargo Flight 164, a Boeing 747-200 operated on behalf of Kalitta Air, crashed into a farm after suffering dual engine failure on takeoff from Bogota-Eldorado Airport. None of the 8 crew on board were killed, but 2 people on the ground were.
- 16 August 2010 – AIRES Flight 8250, a Boeing 737-700, crashed short of the runway at Gustavo Rojas Pinilla International Airport. The aircraft broke into 3 parts, and 2 passengers were killed.

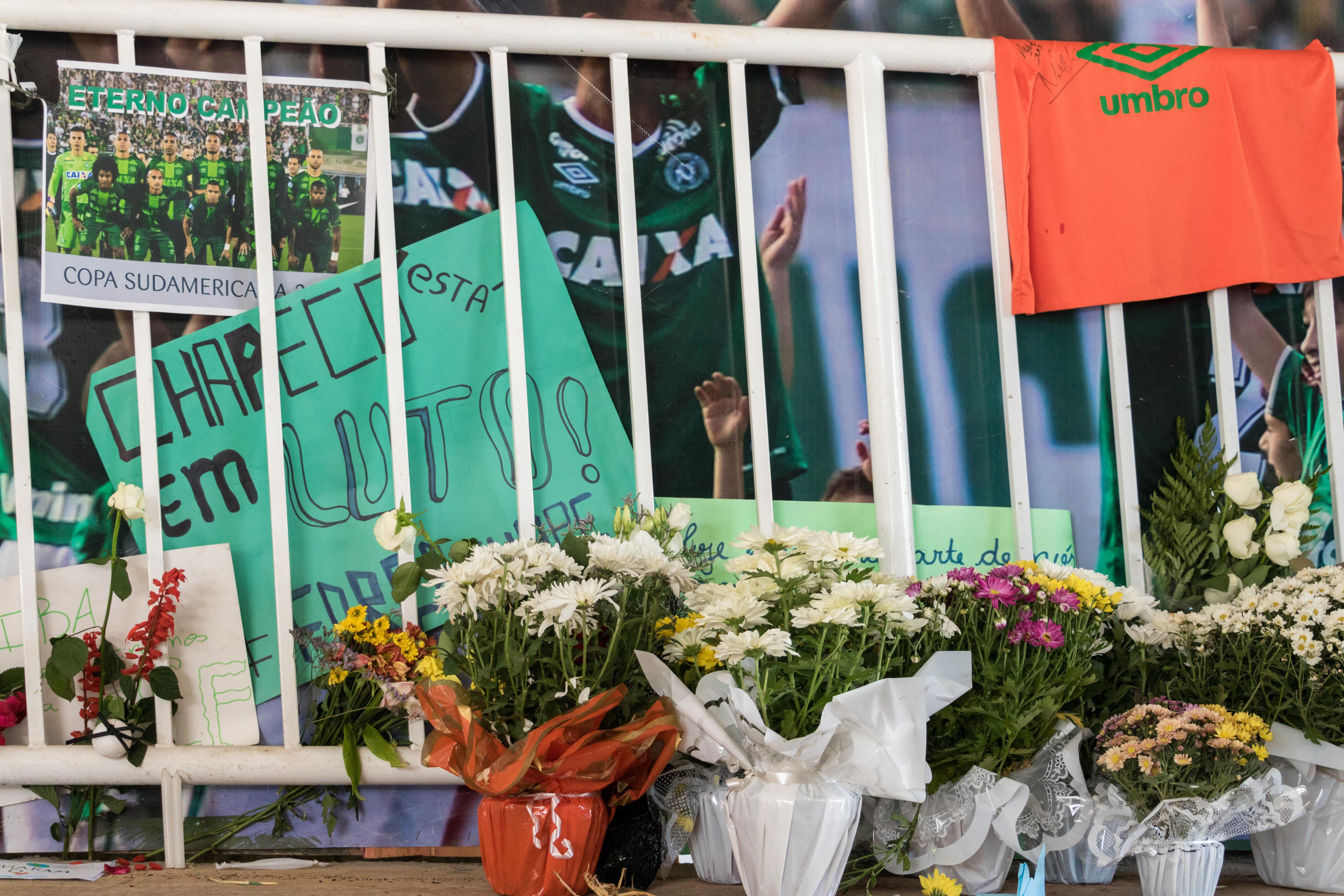
Vigil was held in Chapecó to honor the victims of LaMia Flight 2933

- 28 November 2016 – LaMia Flight 2933, an Avro RJ85, crashed into Mt. Cerro Gordo after suffering fuel exhaustion on approach to Rionegro. 77 people were on board, including the Brazilian football team Chapecoence; 71 were killed, including most of the team.
- 20 December 2016 – Aerosucre Flight 157, a Boeing 727 freighter, overran the runway on takeoff at Puerto Carreño Airport. The aircraft became airborne, but had lost its right main landing gear, sustained damage to its flaps and hydraulic systems, and suffered a failure of the number 3 engine. The aircraft crashed while attempting to return to the airport, killing 5 of the 6 crew members on board.
- 9 March 2019 – a Douglas DC-3 operated by Laser Aéreo crashed in San Martín, Meta, following an engine failure. The propellers of the engine could not be feathered after the failure, causing drag. All 14 passengers and crew were killed.
- 28 January 2026 – SATENA Flight 8849, a Beechcraft 1900 operated by SEARCA, crashed in La Playa de Belén, killing all 15 on board.

=== Ecuador ===
- 15 August 1976 – SAETA Flight 011, a Vickers Viscount, crashed into the Chimborazo Volcano, killing all 59 people on board.
- 23 April 1979 – SAETA Flight 011, a Vickers Viscount, crashed into a mountainous region of Pastaza, killing all 57 on board.
- 1 September 1982 – a DHC-4 operated by Aerolíneas Cóndor crashed near Valladolid Parish, killing all 44 on board.
- 11 July 1983 – **TAME Flight 173**, a Boeing 737-200, struck a hill on final approach to Cuenca Airport, after the pilots had descended below minimum safe altitude while distracted trying to locate the runway. All 119 on board were killed. The investigation revealed a lack of training on the aircraft type, an underqualified captain, and labour issues at the airline.
- 18 September 1984 – Aeroservicios Ecuatorianos Flight 767-103, a DC-8-55F, overran the runway on takeoff from Quito Airport. The aircraft struck an ILS antenna and crashed into multiple houses, killing all 4 crew members and 49 people on the ground.
- 22 October 1996 – Millon Air Flight 406, a Boeing 707, suffered engine failure on takeoff from Manta Eloy Alfaro International Airport. The aircraft crashed into a residential area, killing all 4 on board and 30 on the ground.
- 29 August 1998 – Cubana de Aviación Flight 389, a Tupolev Tu-154, overran the runway following an aborted takeoff from Quito Airport and crashed into a residential neighbourhood. 70 of the 91 passengers and crew were killed, as well as 10 on the ground.
- 30 August 2008 – a Conviasa Boeing 737-200 on a ferry flight crashed into the Illiniza, killing all 3 crew members on board.

=== Guyana ===
- 30 July 2011 – Caribbean Airlines Flight 523, a Boeing 737-800, overran the runway at Georgetown Cheddi Jagan International Airport, went through the perimeter fence, and broke into two sections. Seven people were injured, but no one was killed.
- 9 November 2018 – **Fly Jamaica Airways Flight 256**, a Boeing 757, suffered a hydraulic failure after departing from Georgetown. The aircraft overran the runway during an emergency landing at Cheddi Jagan International Airport, killing 1 passenger.

=== Peru ===
- 27 November 1962 – Varig Flight 810, a Boeing 707, crashed into a mountain on approach to Lima, killing all 97 on board.
- 27 April 1966 – LANSA Flight 501, a Lockheed L-749, crashed into the side of Mount Talalua, killing all 49 on board.
- 8 December 1967 – a Faucett Perú Douglas C-54 crashed into a mountain in Cordillera de Carpish, killing all 72 on board.
- 9 August 1970 – LANSA Flight 502, a Lockheed L-188, crashed shortly after takeoff from Alejandro Velasco Astete International Airport following a mismanaged engine failure. 99 of the 100 occupants were killed, as well as 2 people on the ground.
- 24 December 1971 – LANSA Flight 508, a Lockheed Electra, broke up in mid air over the Amazon in Puerto Inca following a lightning strike. 91 people were killed; the sole survivor, 17-year-old Juliane Koepcke, treked through the jungle for 11 days before she was found.
- 8 December 1987 – a Navy-owned Fokker F27 chartered by football club Alianza Lima crashed into the Pacific on approach to Lima International Airport. Of the 43 on board, only the captain survived.
- 14 February 1992 – amidst a Cholera outbreak in Peru, contaminated food was loaded onto Aerolíneas Argentinas Flight 386 in Lima for a flight to Los Angeles. 76 passengers became sick, and one died.
- 25 February 1994 – Expresso Aéreo Flight 028, a Yakovlev Yak-40, crashed into Mount Carpish after departing from Tingo María, killing all 31 on board.
- 29 February 1996 – **Faucett Flight 251**, a Boeing 737-200, crashed on approach to Rodríguez Ballón International Airport in Arequipa, killing all 123 people on board.
- 5 May 1998 – a Boeing 737-200 owned by the Peruvian Air Force and chartered by Occidental Petroleum crashed on approach to Andoas, killing 75 of the 88 people on board.
- 9 January 2003 – TANS Perú Flight 222, a Fokker F28, crashed on approach to Chachapoyas Airport, killing all 46 on board.
- 23 August 2005 – TANS Peru Flight 204, a Boeing 737-200, crashed during a storm in the jungle during a diversion to Pucallpa Airport, killing 40 people of the 98 on board.
- 17 December 2012 – an Antonov An-26 operated by Amazon Sky crashed in Yauyos province following a dual engine failure due to icing. All 4 crew members were killed.
- 7 April 2013 – a Mil Mi-8 helicopter of Helicópteros del Pacífico broke up and crashed near a Perenco oil site near the Curaray River, following a failure of the tail rotor control. All 13 on board were killed.
- 28 March 2017 – Peruvian Airlines Flight 112, a Boeing 737-300, suffered a landing gear collapse after a hard landing at Francisco Carle Airport. A fire broke out and destroyed the aircraft, but nobody was killed.
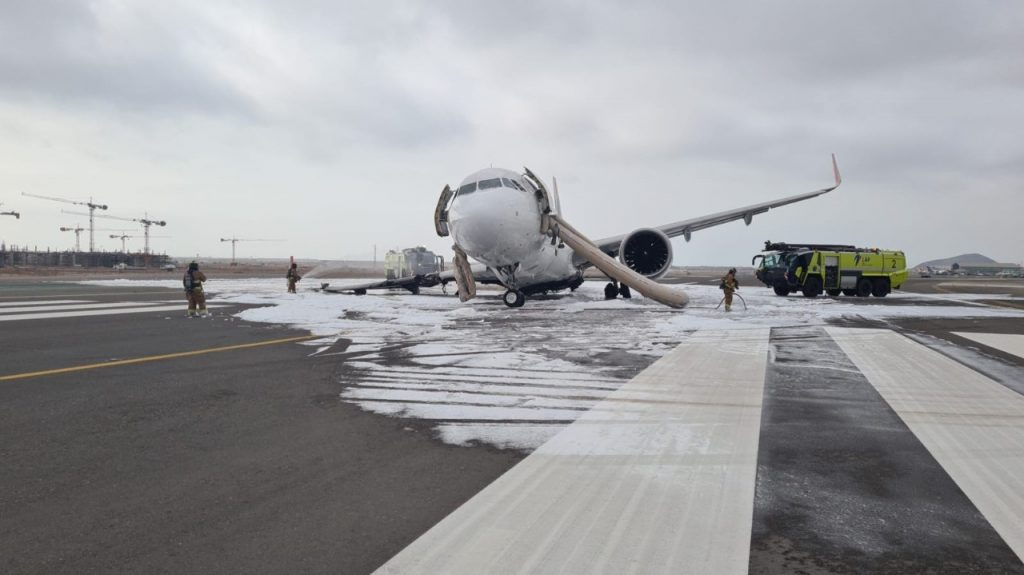
  LATAM Peru Flight 2213 after the collision
- 18 November 2022 – LATAM Perú Flight 2213, an Airbus A320neo, collided with a fire truck on takeoff from Lima International Airport. All passengers were unharmed but three firefighters were killed. The aircraft was written off due to fire damage.
- 1 August 2026 – an Aerodiana Cessna 208 crashed near Nazca, killing all 13 people on board.

=== Suriname ===
- 7 June 1989 – **Surinam Airways Flight 764**, a Douglas DC-8-62 clipped a tree and flipped over while on approach to Zanderij airport, Suriname. 178 of the 197 on board were killed, including a group of Surinamese football players called Colourful 11.
- 3 April 2008 – an Antonov An-28 of Blue Wing Airlines crashed into a mountain during a go-around from Lawa Antino Airstrip. All 19 on board were killed.

=== Uruguay ===
- 10 October 1997 – **Austral Líneas Aéreas Flight 2553**, a DC-9, crashed in Nuevo Berlín. The pilots responded to a false stall warning by pitching the nose down and extending the aircraft's slats. The speed exceeded the safe limits for the aircraft's configuration, and the slats detached from the aircraft, causing a loss of control. All 74 passengers and crew were killed.

=== Venezuela ===
- 27 November 1956 – Linea Aeropostal Venezolana Flight 253, a Lockheed Constellation, was flying through a rainstorm as it approached Caracas Airport when it crashed into a mountain, killing all 25 people on board.
- 25 February 1962 – an Avensa Fairchild F-27 crashed into San Juan Mountain on Margarita Island, killing all 23 on board.
- 12 December 1968 – Pan Am Flight 217, a Boeing 707, crashed into the Caribbean sea off Caracas, killing all 51 on board.
- 16 March 1969 – Viasa Flight 742, a McDonnell Douglas DC-9-32, lost control crashed near Maracaibo Airport after takeoff, killing 84 people on the aircraft and 71 on the ground. With 155 total fatalities, it was the world's deadliest aviation accident at the time.
- 3 December 1969 – Air France Flight 212, a Boeing 707, plunged into the sea one minute after taking off from Caracas Airport. All 62 on board were killed; the cause remains unknown.
- 3 March 1978 – a LAV Hawker Siddeley HS 748 crashed off the coast of Punta Mulatos, after reporting an instrument failure. All 47 on board were killed.
- March 11, 1983 – Avensa Flight 007, a McDonnell Douglas DC-9, crashed after a hard landing at Barquisimeto Airport. The landing gear collapsed on touchdown, and the aircraft skidded off the runway and burst into flames. 23 of the 50 people on board were killed.
- 22 December 1974 – Avensa Flight 358, a DC-9, lost control and crashed shortly after takeoff from Maturín Airport, killing all 75 on board.
- 3 November 1980 – a Convair 880 operated by Latin Carga crashed on a training flight on takeoff from Caracas Airport, killing all 4 crew members on board.
- 5 March 1991 – Aeropostal Alas de Venezuela Flight 109, a McDonnell Douglas DC-9, crashed into a mountain shortly after taking off from La Chinita International Airport. All 45 passengers and crew are killed.
- 25 December 1999 – Cubana de Aviación Flight 310, a Yakovlev Yak-42 crashed near Valencia while attempting to divert to Arturo Merino Benítez International Airport. All 22 on board were killed.
- 25 January 2001 – RUTACA Airlines Flight 225, a DC-3, lost control and crashed in Ciudad Bolívar following an apparent engine failure. All 24 on board were killed as well as 1 on the ground.
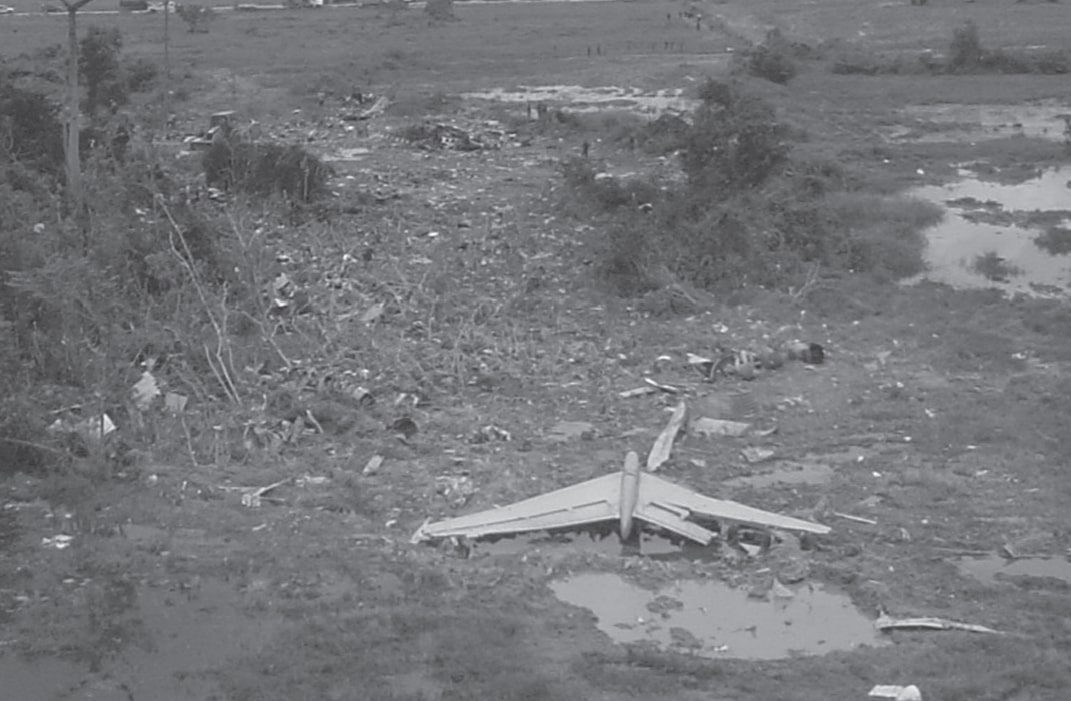
  West Caribbean Airways Flight 708
- 16 August 2005 – **West Caribbean Airways Flight 708**, a McDonnell Douglas MD-82, suffered a deep stall above Venezuela while flying between Panama and Martinique. The pilots misidentified the stall and did not take corrective measures, and the aircraft crashed into a field in Machiques. All 160 on board were killed.
- 4 January 2008 – a Let L-410 Turbolet operated by Transaven ditched off the coast of the Los Roques Archipelago after suffering a dual engine failure. None of the 14 on board survived.
- 21 February 2008 – Santa Bárbara Airlines Flight 518, an ATR 42-300, crashed into mountains shortly after taking off from Mérida, killing all 46 on board.
- 13 September 2010 – Conviasa Flight 2350, an ATR 42, crashed on approach to Ciudad Guyana Airport, following mismanagement of a malfunction of the crew alerting system. 17 of the 51 passengers and crew on board were killed.

== International waters ==
The following accidents and incidents occurred in international waters; that is, more than 12 nautical miles (22 km; 14 mi) off the coast of any territory.

=== Atlantic Ocean ===
- 21 January 1939 – an Imperial Airways Short Empire ditched into the Atlantic following engine icing. 3 people were killed; 10 survivors were rescued 10 hours later.
- 1 June 1943 – BOAC Flight 777, a DC-3, was shot down by Luftwaffe fighter planes over the Bay of Biscay. All 17 aboard died, including actor Leslie Howard.
- 1 August 1948 – Air France Flight 072, a Latécoère 631, crashed into the Atlantic en route from Martinique to Port-Étienne, killing all 52 people on board.
- 30 January 1948 – Star Tiger, a BSAA Avro Tudor, disappeared between the Azores and Bermuda. The aircraft and its 31 occupants were never found.
- 17 January 1949 – Star Ariel, a BSAA Avro Tudor, disappeared on a flight between Bermuda and Jamaica. The aircraft and its 20 occupants were never found. The disappearance of this aircraft and of Star Tiger the previous year contributed to the Bermuda Triangle legend.
- 2 February 1953 – a Skyways Avro York with 39 people on board disappeared en route from the UK to Jamaica and was never found.
- 14 February 1953 – National Airlines Flight 470, a DC-6, broke up and crashed into the Gulf of Mexico, killing all 46 on board.
- 20 June 1956 – LAV Flight 253, a Lockheed Super Constellation, caught fire and crashed into the Atlantic off Asbury Park, New Jersey, while preparing for an emergency landing due to engine trouble. All 74 aboard died.
- 14 August 1958 – KLM Flight 607-E, a Lockheed Super Constellation, crashed 180 kilometres (110 mi) west of Shannon, Ireland. The most likely cause was catastrophic mechanical failure, though the cause is officially undetermined. All 99 aboard died.
- 16 November 1959 – National Airlines Flight 967, a DC-7, exploded over the Gulf of Mexico, killing all 42 on board. Bombing was suspected, but never proven.
- 23 September 1962 – Flying Tiger Line Flight 923, a Lockheed Super Constellation, ditched into the Atlantic 800 km west of Shannon following engine failure. 28 people were killed; the 48 survivors survived on a life raft for 6 hours before being rescued.
- 11 September 1968 – Air France Flight 1611, a Sud Aviation Caravelle, crashed into the Mediterranean sea off Nice after suffering an in-flight fire of unknown origin. All 89 passengers and 6 crew members on board were killed; it is the deadliest crash to occur in the Mediterranean.
- 2 May 1970 – ALM Flight 980, a DC-9 operated by Overseas National Airways, ran out of fuel after several unsuccessful landing attempts. The crews were forced to ditch the plane, and 23 people drowned.
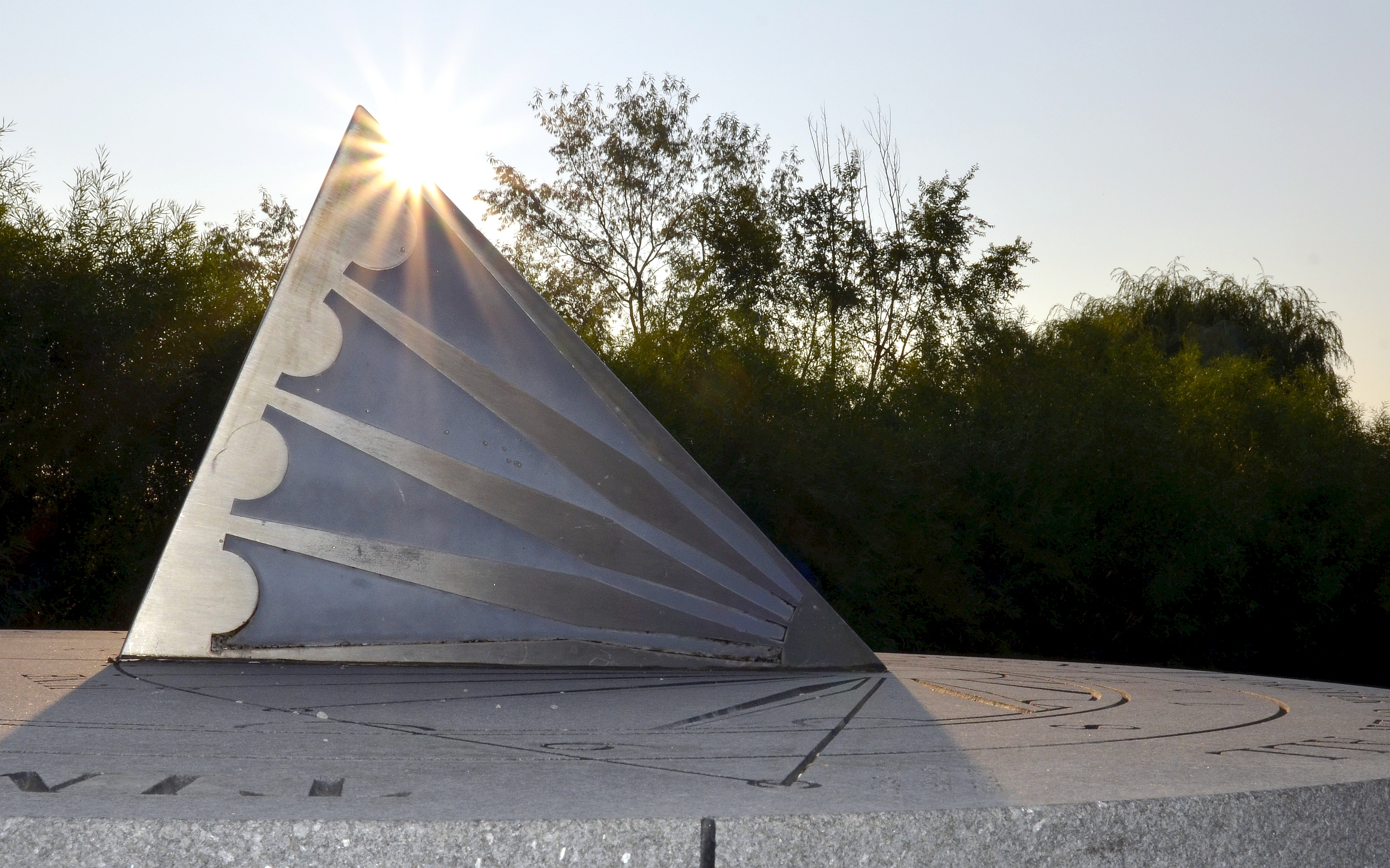
  Memorial for the victims of Air India Flight 182 in Toronto
- 23 June 1985 – **Air India Flight 182**, a Boeing 747-200, was flying over the Atlantic Ocean west of Ireland when a bomb exploded in the cargo hold. The aircraft disintegrated and plunged into the Atlantic, killing all 329 people on board.
- 6 February 1996 – Birgenair Flight 301, a Boeing 757, crashed into the Caribbean Sea near the Dominican Republic, killing all 189 passengers and crew. Investigators found that the pitot tubes were providing inaccurate airspeed readings, likely having been blocked by a wasp nest, which the pilots mishandled and put the plane into a deep stall.
- 2 September 1998 – Swissair Flight 111, a McDonnell Douglas MD-11, crashed off the Atlantic coast of Nova Scotia following an in-flight fire. All 229 passengers and crew were killed.
- 31 October 1999 – EgyptAir Flight 990, a Boeing 767, crashed into Georges Bank off the Atlantic coast of Nantucket. All 217 aboard were killed. The American NTSB determined the crash was intentional on behalf of the first officer, but the Egyptian Civil Aviation Authority disputed this, and concluded the incident was caused by mechanical failure.
- 4 October 2001 – Siberia Airlines Flight 1812, a Tupolev Tu-154, was mistakenly shot down by the Ukrainian Air Force. All 78 people aboard were killed. Ukraine paid ~$15 million compensation to victims' relatives.
- 22 December 2001 – American Airlines Flight 63, a Boeing 767, was the subject of an attempted bombing over the Atlantic Ocean. The bomber attempted to light a bomb hidden in his shoe, but it failed to detonate, and he was restrained and sedated. The aircraft landed safely.
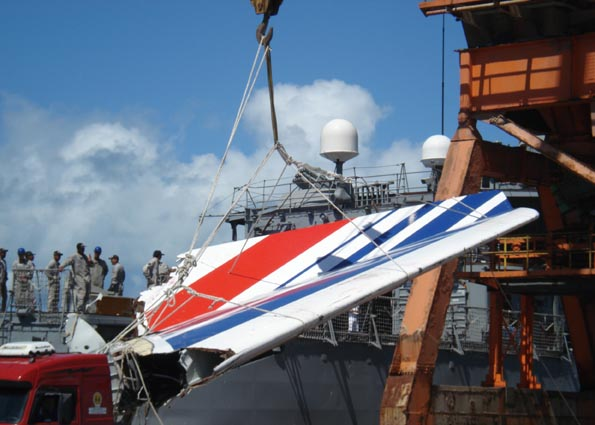
  Tailfin of Air France Flight 447
- 1 June 2009 – Air France Flight 447, an Airbus A330 was flying from Rio de Janeiro to Paris when the pilots encountered a faulty airspeed reading due to ice accumulation in the pitot tubes. Miscommunication over the faulty readings led to a deep stall, and the aircraft plunged into the Atlantic, killing all 228 on board.

=== Indian Ocean ===
- 29 November 1987 – Korean Air Flight 858, a Boeing 707, was destroyed by a bomb planted by North Korean agents while flying west of Myanmar. All 115 on board died.
- 28 November 1987 – **South African Airways Flight 295**, a Boeing 747-200C, crashed into the Indian Ocean in international waters off the coast of Mauritius after a catastrophic in-flight fire. The cause of the fire was never determined. All 159 aboard were killed.
- 8 March 2014 – Malaysia Airlines Flight 370, a Boeing 777, went missing over the Indian Ocean while heading from Kuala Lumpur to Beijing. All 239 people on board were presumed dead. The aircraft has yet to be found, but small pieces of wreckage have been recovered.
- 7 July 2026 – K2 Airways Flight 1732, a Boeing 737-400, crashed into the ocean south of Ormara, Pakistan. All 5 crew remain missing and are presumed dead.

=== Pacific Ocean ===
- 28 July 1938 – Pan Am Flight 229, a Martin M-130, disappeared over the Western Pacific, with 15 passengers and crew on board.
- 26 March 1955 – Pan Am Flight 845/26, a Boeing 377, ditched into the Pacific 35 miles west of Oregon after suffering an engine separation. 4 people were killed.
- 8 November 1957 – Pan Am Flight 7, a Boeing 377, crashed into the Pacific en route from San Francisco to Honolulu, killing all 44 on board. The cause was never determined.
- 16 March 1962 – Flying Tiger Line Flight 739, a Lockheed Constellation, disappeared over the Pacific, with its last recorded position being 280 nm west of Guam. 107 people were on board and the aircraft was never found.
- 1 September 1983 – **Korean Air Lines Flight 007**, a Boeing 747-200, was shot down over the Sea of Okhotsk after mistakenly straying into Soviet airspace. All 269 people on board were killed.
- 19 February 1985 – China Airlines Flight 006, a Boeing 747SP, lost control and plunged 30,000 feet over the pacific en route to Los Angeles. The pilots had become disoriented while managing an engine failure, leading to the in-flight upset. The aircraft made an emergency landing in San Francisco. 24 people were injured.
- 6 April 1993 – China Eastern Airlines Flight 583, a McDonnell Douglas MD-11, suffered an in-flight upset above the Pacific after the pilots inadvertently extended the slats at cruising altitude, and failed to stabilize the aircraft. The aircraft made an emergency landing at Shemya Air Force Base, but 2 people were killed by their injuries.
- 11 December 1994 – Philippine Airlines Flight 434, a Boeing 747-200, was damaged by a bomb hidden under a seat east of Okinawa. One passenger was killed by the explosion and 10 others were injured. The aircraft suffered major damage but the pilots were able to make an emergency landing at Naha Airport.
- 2 October 1996 – Aeroperú Flight 603, a Boeing 757, crashed into the ocean off the coast of Peru, killing all 70 on board. Investigation revealed that the pitot-static were blocked by tape, leading to inaccurate airspeed and altitude readings which misled the pilots.
- 28 December 1997 – United Airlines Flight 826, a Boeing 747-200, encountered severe Clear-air turbulence while on route from Tokyo to Honolulu. The plane made a safe return to Tokyo, but one passenger was killed in the upset.
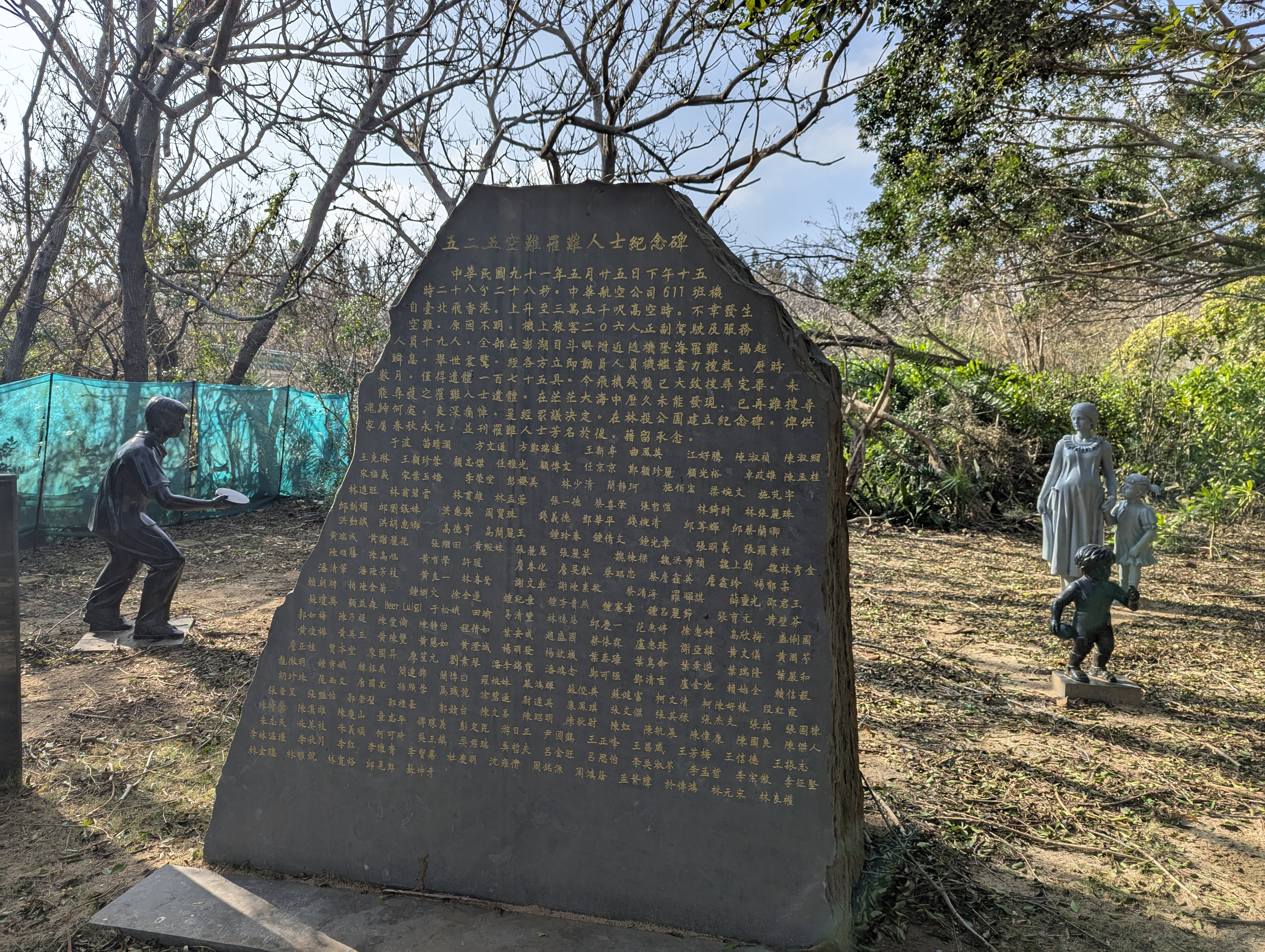
  Memorial for the victims of China Airlines Flight 611
- 25 May 2002 – China Airlines Flight 611, a Boeing 747-200, broke up in mid-air over the Taiwan Strait, killing all 225 on board. Investigation revealed that a tailstrike had been improperly repaired 22 years prior, causing fatigue cracking to gradually form and eventually leading to the in-flight detachment of the aft section of the fuselage.
- 28 July 2011 – Asiana Airlines Flight 991, a Boeing 747-400F crashed following an in-flight fire 130 km west of Jeju Island, South Korea. Both pilots were killed.

== See also ==
- List of deadliest aircraft accidents and incidents
- List of accidents and incidents involving airliners by airline
- List of accidents and incidents involving commercial aircraft
