= 1961 President Airlines Douglas DC-6 crash =

1961 aircraft accident in Ireland

Coordinates: 52.6797°N 8.9430°W

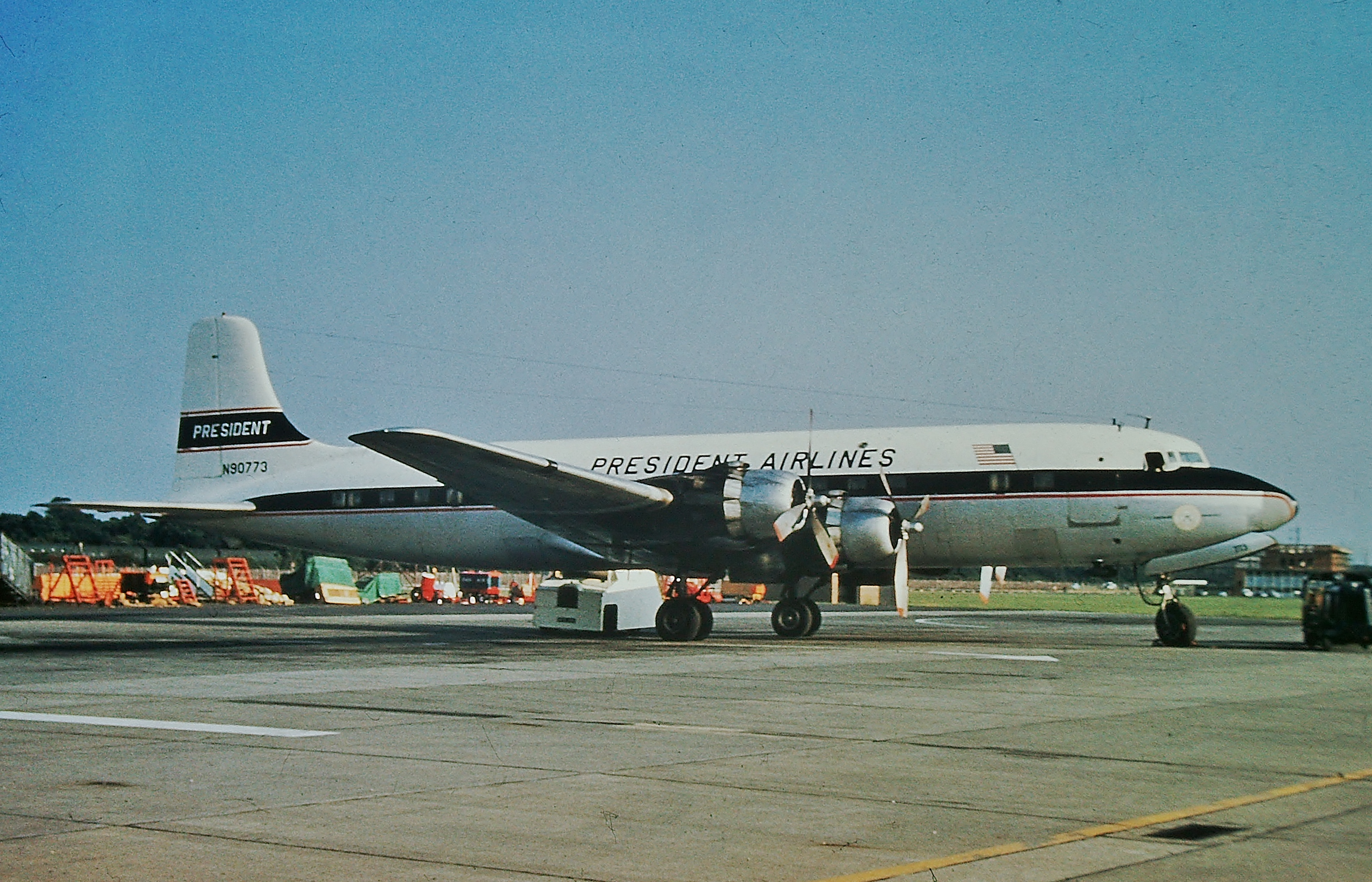
- N90773, the aircraft involved in the accident, photographed in August 1961

Accident
- Date: 10 September 1961
- Summary: Instrument failure and bad weather leading to a loss of control
- Site: River Shannon, Ireland

Aircraft
- Aircraft type: Douglas DC-6B
- Aircraft name: Theodore Roosevelt
- Operator: President Airlines
- Registration: N90773
- Flight origin: Düsseldorf Airport, Düsseldorf, West Germany
- Stopover: Shannon Airport, Shannon, County Clare, Ireland
- Last stopover: Gander International Airport, Gander, Newfoundland, Canada
- Destination: Chicago O'Hare International Airport, Chicago, Illinois, United States
- Occupants: 83
- Passengers: 77
- Crew: 6
- Fatalities: 83
- Survivors: 0

The 1961 President Airlines Douglas DC-6 crash occurred on the night of September 10, 1961, when a President Airlines Douglas DC-6 named Theodore Roosevelt outbound from Shannon, Ireland crashed into the nearby River Shannon shortly after takeoff, killing all 83 people on board. To date, the crash remains the deadliest one in Irish territory.

== Airline ==
President Airlines was a supplemental air carrier (at the time, a charter/scheduled airline hybrid), that in 1960 bought the airline certificate of California Eastern Airways, a carrier that had mainly operated under contract for the US government. The airline went out of business shortly after this accident.

== Aircraft and occupants ==
The aircraft involved was a Douglas DC-6B registered as N90773. It first flew in 1953 and was powered by four Pratt & Whitney R-2800 engines. The aircraft's occupants on the accident flight consisted of 77 passengers and 6 crew members.

== Accident ==
The aircraft was on a non-scheduled international passenger flight from Düsseldorf, Germany to Chicago with stopovers in Shannon and Gander, Newfoundland for refueling. Shortly after takeoff from Shannon Airport's runway 24, the pilots were cleared for a right-hand turn, but they instead turned left and kept turning until the aircraft had reached a bank angle of about 90 degrees or more. Unable to recover, the aircraft plummeted into the River Shannon 5,000 ft. from the end of the runway. There were no survivors among the 83 passengers and crew.

== Cause ==
Subsequent investigations indicate that the crash probably resulted from a malfunctioning attitude indicator, a fault in the starboard ailerons, or both. Poor weather conditions and crew fatigue were also cited as possible contributing factors.

== See also ==
- Air India Flight 855 – another accident in which the attitude indicator failed, causing the pilot to bank too far to the left and lose control.
- Korean Air Flight 8509
- Copa Flight 201
- West Air Sweden Flight 294
