= Korean airline crash =

Korean airline crash may refer to:

- Jeju Air Flight 2216, 2024, which crashed in South Korea on arrival from Thailand
- Asiana Airlines Flight 214, 2013, from Incheon, South Korea, that crashed on arrival at San Francisco, California
- Asiana Airlines Flight 991 (OZ991, AAR991), 2011, a cargo flight which crashed into the Korea Strait
- Korean Air Cargo Flight 8509, 1999, which crashed shortly after takeoff from London
- Korean Air Flight 801 (KE801, KAL801), 1997, a charter flight from South Korea to Guam which crashed on landing approach
- Asiana Air Flight 733 (OZ733, AAR733), 1993 a flight between Seoul and Mokpo, South Korea that crashed into Mt. Ungeo

== See also ==
- Korean Air incidents and accidents, those involving Korean Air Lines Co. aircraft
