= Korean Air Flight 631 =

2022 aviation accident in the Philippines

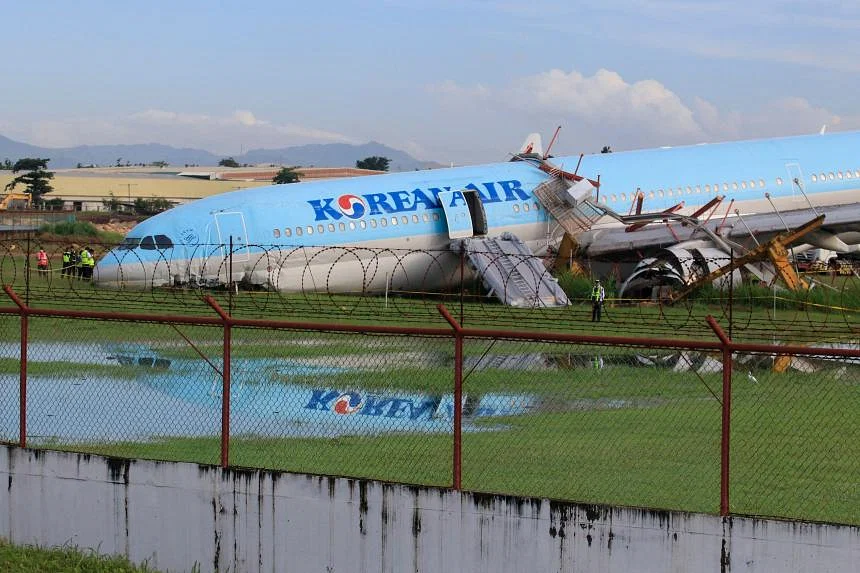
- The aircraft involved after overrunning the runway

Accident
- Date: 23 October 2022
- Summary: Runway overrun due to partial hydraulic failure compounded by pilot error, bad weather, and lack of procedures
- Site: Mactan–Cebu International Airport, Lapu-Lapu City, Cebu, Philippines; 10°17′42″N 123°58′00″E

Aircraft
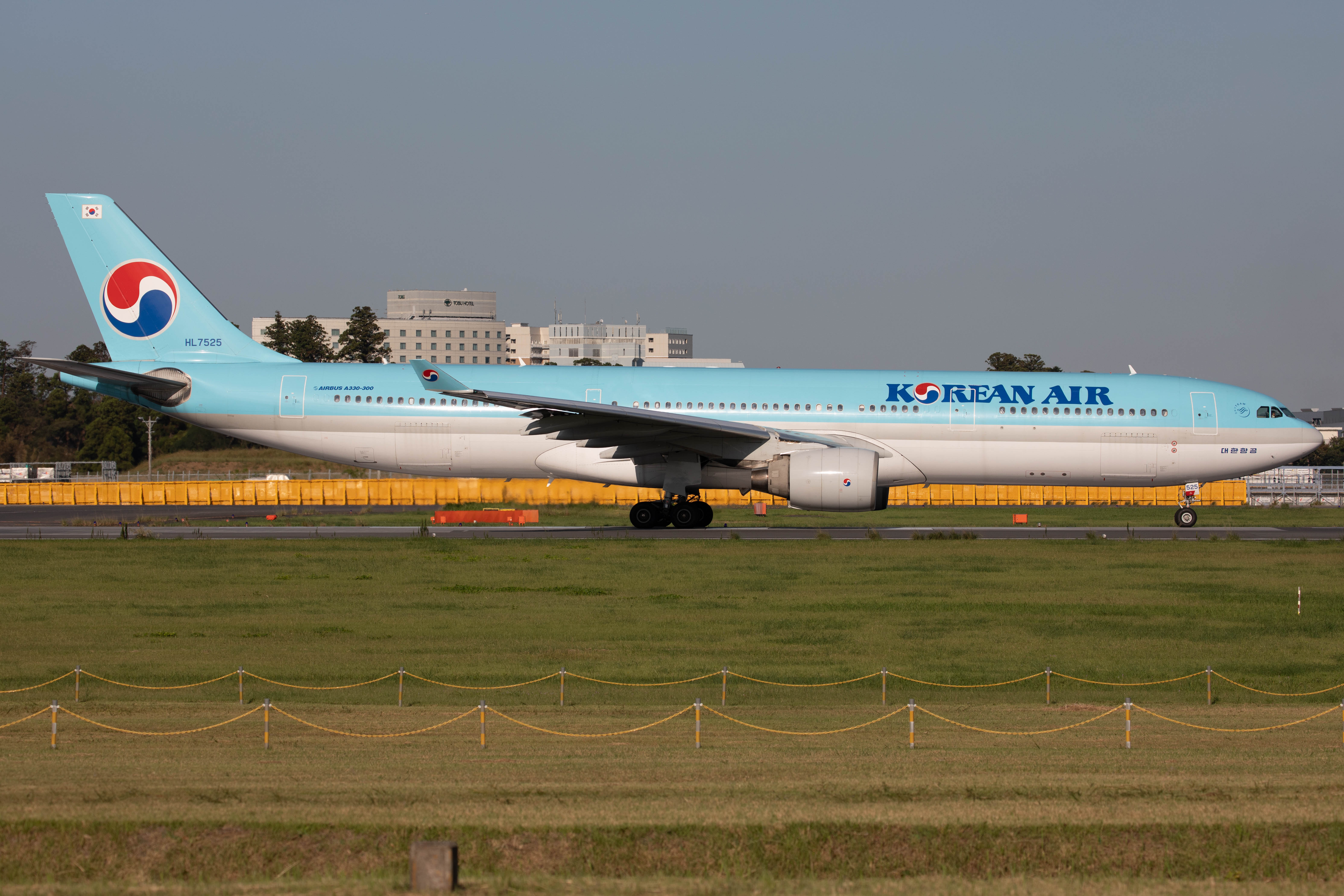
- HL7525, the aircraft involved in the accident, seen in 2019
- Aircraft type: Airbus A330-322
- Operator: Korean Air
- IATA flight No.: KE631
- ICAO flight No.: KAL631
- Call sign: KOREAN AIR 631
- Registration: HL7525
- Flight origin: Incheon International Airport, Jung District, Incheon, Seoul, South Korea
- Destination: Mactan–Cebu International Airport, Lapu-Lapu City, Cebu, Philippines
- Occupants: 173
- Passengers: 162
- Crew: 11
- Fatalities: 0
- Injuries: 20
- Survivors: 173

Korean Air Flight 631 was a scheduled international passenger flight operating from Incheon International Airport near Seoul, South Korea to Mactan–Cebu International Airport in Metro Cebu, Philippines. On 23 October 2022, the Airbus A330 operating this flight overran the runway while landing in Cebu due to a failure with the hydraulics system. No one was killed, but 20 people were injured.

The aircraft was damaged beyond repair and written off as a result of the accident, and also resulted in the 14th hull loss of an Airbus A330 worldwide.

The accident resulted in the first hull loss of a Korean Air aircraft since Korean Air Cargo Flight 8509 crashed in Great Hallingbury, United Kingdom, nearly 23 years prior.

== Background ==
=== Aircraft ===
The aircraft involved in the accident was a 24-year-old Airbus A330-322, with manufacturer serial number 219, registered as HL7525. The aircraft first flew on 12 May 1998, and was delivered brand new to Korean Air on 26 June 1998. The aircraft was powered by two Pratt & Whitney PW4168 engines.

=== Crew ===
The unnamed captain on board was 52, and had 13,043 flight hours, with 9,285 being on the A330. The also unnamed first officer was 37, and had 1,603 flight hours, of which 1,035 were on the A330.

== Accident ==
The flight departed Seoul at 19:20 KST (10:20 UTC) and was scheduled to land at Cebu at 22:00 PHT (14:00 UTC). At about 22:12 PHT (14:12 UTC) KE631 was on final approach to Mactan–Cebu International Airport. There was scattered thunderstorm and the crew received instruction from the control tower to land on runway 4 to avoid landing with a tailwind. As they were descending and before the final approach, the wind direction changed and they were instructed to use runway 22 instead. During their descend at low attitude, the plane encountered a heavy rain shower that obstructed visibility so the pilots executed a go-around. During the second landing attempt the plane encountered turbulence at 300 ft that pushed the plane below the glide path. The responding pilot maneuver overcorrected and raised the plane above the glide path before the subsequent pilot action overcorrected to the down side and pushed the plane below the glide path. The pilot reacted by pitching the plane's nose up to attempt to bring the aircraft to the correct altitude. At this moment, the crosswind shifted to a tailwind with an additional downdraft pushing the plane from the top, which nullified the pilot's nose up maneuver and kept the plane below its correct altitude. The plane was flying too low and at 22:26 and less than 75 ft from the ground, the pilots attempted a second go-around. However, the plane's right gear struck the ground two meters short of the runway before it could take off and the right gear was severely damaged.

After the plane flew to above 1,500 ft, several fault messages were displayed that alerted the pilots of the seriousness of their situation. The plane could no longer detect gear status and the crew had no idea if the gear was up or down (it was down). The normal braking system with anti-skid, reverse thrust, and ground spoilers were disabled because the gear had lost communication with the system and in its place, the alternate braking system was enabled. The aircraft circled northeast of Cebu for approximately 30 minutes before conducting a third approach.

Unbeknown to anyone at this point, the aircraft had been leaking hydraulic fluid inside the Pressure Relief Valve (PRV) for some time before the accident. The hydraulic fluid was leaked into another fluid line and pumped back into circulation so neither the flight nor the maintenance crew noticed the fault. However, with the right gear damaged, the hydraulic fluid was now leaking out of the airplane. This means the alternate braking system was compromised. A fault warning was displayed and the pilots responded according to operation manual to turn off the alternate brakes to stop fluid from leaking and to rely on the emergency brakes instead. However, because the PRV had been leaking, the accumulator pressure that the emergency brakes relied on was also compromised. In essence, the airplane had virtually no braking power but the flight crew was unaware.

On the third attempt, the aircraft touched down at 23:08, but was unable to stop on the runway and it ran off the runway at 83 knots. The aircraft continued past the end of the runway, striking an instrument landing system lighting array before stopping 300 metres (980 ft; 330 yd) beyond the runway threshold. According to eyewitness accounts, "The instrument landing system lighting array laid over the wings of the aircraft once the aircraft was stopped in the marsh."

Weather reports indicated that the wind speed was 9 knots (17 km/h; 10 mph) from the south-west at 220 degrees. As the aircraft landed on runway 22, there was a 9-knot (17 km/h; 10 mph) headwind present. Visibility was 8,000 metres (8.0 km; 5.0 mi; 4.3 nmi) at the time of the accident, with thunderstorms and rain in the area; there were no reports of lightning. Cumulonimbus clouds were scattered at 1,800 metres (5,900 ft) and overcast at 9,000 metres (30,000 ft) above Cebu. Other planes decided to divert due to weather prior to KE631's landing attempts, but there is no information on the time span between the other diversions and the Korean Air flight.

== Aftermath ==
As the result of the accident, flights to Cebu were forced to either return to their origin airport, divert to Francisco Bangoy International Airport in Davao City or to Ninoy Aquino International Airport in Manila, Philippines. More than 100 flights were cancelled entirely.

Korean Air published an apology on their Instagram account, stating "A thorough investigation will be performed together with the local aviation authorities and Korean authorities to determine the cause(s) of this event."

Commentators noted that "there are many unanswered questions" including why the flight crew of this flight chose to attempt the landing when no other pilots deemed it safe. News reports noted the similarities to previous crashes on Korean Air that were caused by pilot error and the airline's historic safety culture.

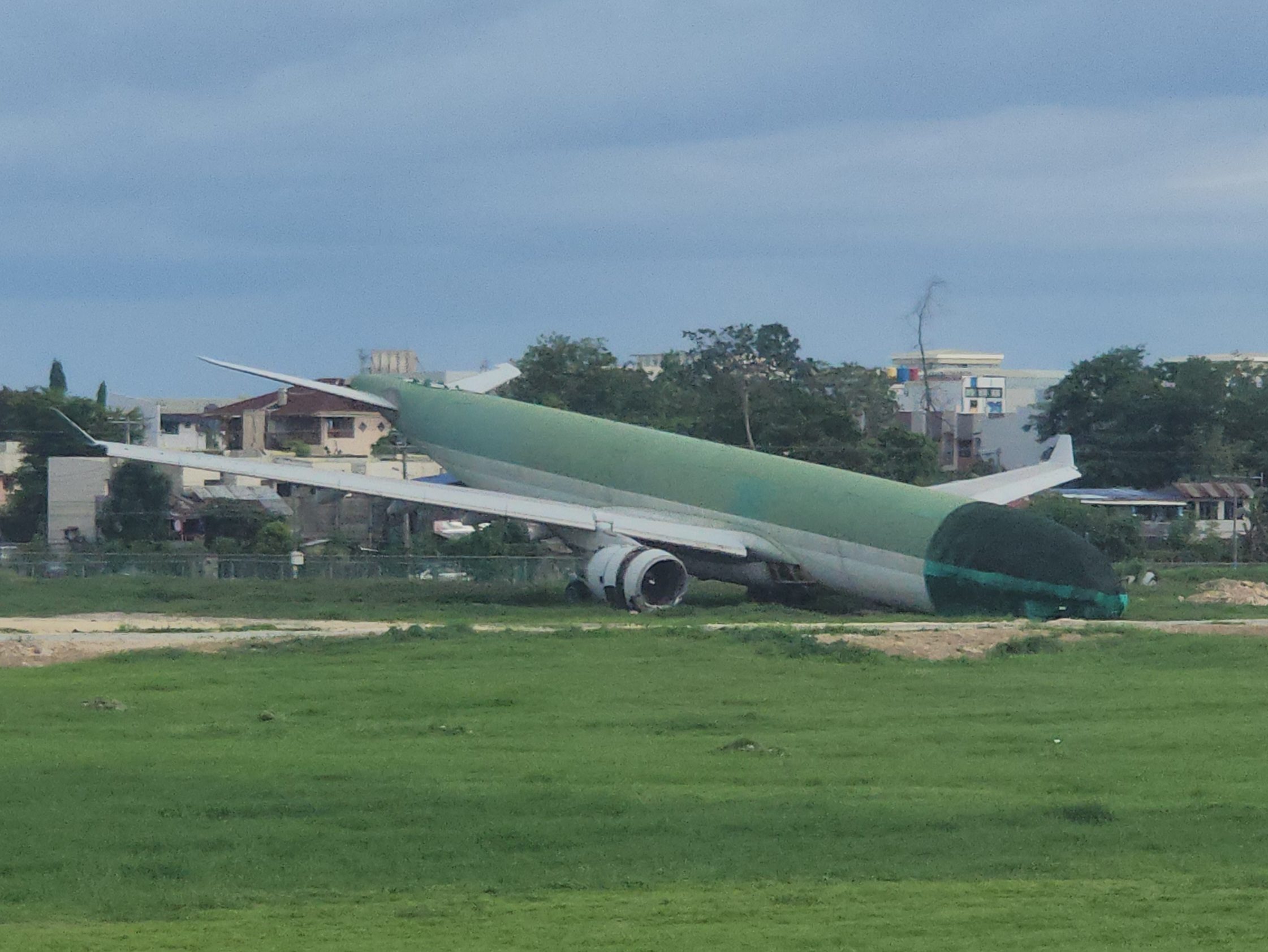
The aftermath of HL7525, after its vertical stabilizer, livery and logo were removed

After another incident where an engine of another Korean Air Airbus A330 had malfunctioned after take-off, Korean Air announced it will be grounding the entirety of its Airbus A330 fleet, pending a safety audit.

Since 31 October 2022, Korean Air changed the Seoul–Cebu route flight number from KE631 to KE615. The return flight to Seoul, KE632, was also changed to KE616.

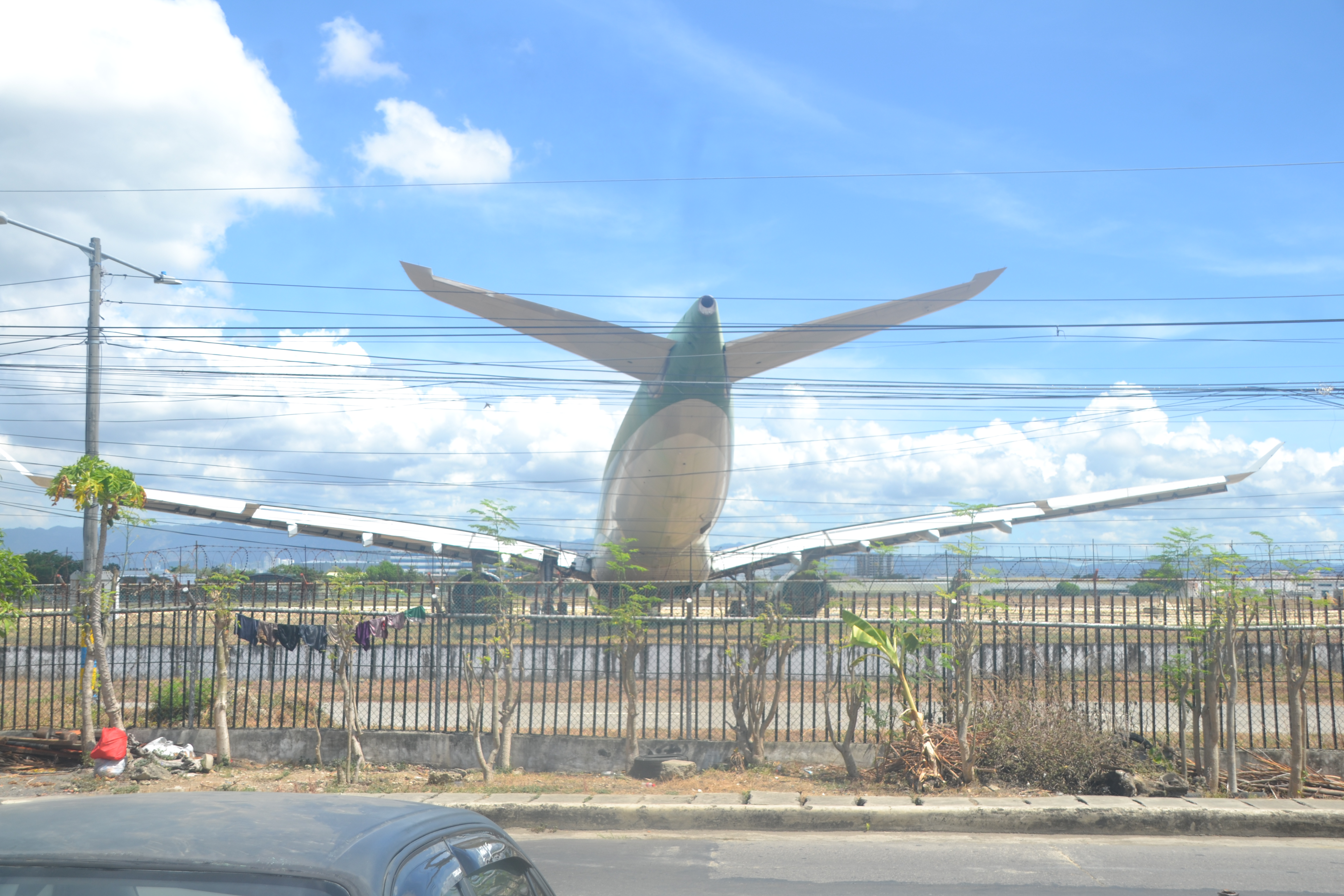
Closeup of HL7525's tail as seen on General Aviation Road

For a while HL7525 remained at the end of the runway with its livery, logo and vertical stabilizer removed. After two months of constructing a road to tow out the aircraft, HL7525 was towed to the southern corner of the airfield, where the almost complete hull has since remained.

== Investigation ==
The accident was investigated by the Civil Aviation Authority of the Philippines (CAAP), with assistance from 40 officers from the Korean Office of Civil Aviation (KOCA) who arrived at Bohol after the accident.

=== Preliminary report ===
On 24 October 2022, Philippine authorities as well as Korean Ministry of Land, Infrastructure and Transport (MOLIT) released a preliminary report that concluded that a hydraulic failure had caused the failure of brakes on the aircraft.

On 25 October 2022, it was reported that the captain of the flight provided testimony that they suffered a hard touchdown on their second approach due to wind shear forcing them down. During the following go-around, a warning light regarding the brakes lit up. The crew therefore declared an emergency. On the third landing attempt, a warning light regarding the pressure of the brakes lit up and the pilots could not slow down the aircraft.

=== Interim report ===
On 23 October 2023, CAAP released the first interim statement, stating that the draft investigation report was in its final stage of preparation. On 22 October 2024, CAAP released the second interim statement, stating that the draft final report had been sent to all concerned Accredited Representatives.

=== Final report ===
On 15 March 2025, CAAP released the final report on the accident, which lists three primary causes of the incident (all three happened on the second approach that resulted in another go around before the final third touchdown):

1. Pilot's forward pitch control resulting in ground contact before the runway
2. Increase in vertical wind factor
3. Right hand main landing gear hit a 15 cm step of the cement edge of runway 22 resulting in damage to the landing gear and subsequent loss of most of the deceleration means.

The contributory cause factors were threefold:

1. Loss of spoilers and reversers
2. Aircraft brake system failure
3. Deficiency in Airbus's crew operating procedure and alerting in relation to blue hydraulic low-level fault.

== See also ==
- Korean Air incidents and accidents
- Runway excursion
- Air France Flight 358 – an Airbus A340 that overran a runway on 2 August 2005
- American Airlines Flight 1420 – a McDonnell Douglas MD-82 that overran a runway on 1 June 1999
- Southwest Airlines Flight 1248 – a Boeing 737 that overran a runway on 8 December 2005
- Korean Air Flight 2033 – an Airbus A300 of the same airline which skidded off the runway at Jeju 28 years before the Flight 631 accident
- Philippine Airlines Flight 137 – another runway excursion incident in the Philippines that happened 24 years prior
- Jeju Air Flight 2216 – a Boeing 737 also operated by a South Korean airline that overran the runway during a belly landing on 29 December 2024
