= Korean Air incidents and accidents =

Korean Air has been in operation since 1969, and this article is about aviation incidents and accidents involving the airline and its predecessor companies Korean National Airlines and Korean Air Lines.

In the late 1990s, Korean Air was known for being "an industry pariah, notorious for fatal crashes" due to its extremely poor safety record as one of the world's most dangerous airlines. In 1999, South Korea's president Kim Dae-jung described the airline's safety record as "an embarrassment to the nation" and chose Korean Air's smaller rival, Asiana, for a flight to the United States.

Between 1970 and 1999, several fatal incidents occurred. Since 1970, 17 Korean Air aircraft were written off in serious incidents, and accidents with the loss of 700 lives. Two Korean Air aircraft were shot down by the Soviet Union, one operating as Korean Air Lines Flight 902 and the other as Korean Air Lines Flight 007. Korean Air's deadliest incident was Flight 007 which was shot down by the Soviet Union on September 1, 1983. All 269 people on board were killed, including a sitting U.S. Congressman, Larry McDonald. The last fatal passenger accident was the Korean Air Flight 801 crash in 1997, which killed 229 people. The last crew fatalities were in the crash of Korean Air Cargo Flight 8509 in December 1999.

Safety reportedly improved since as the airline made concerted efforts to improve standards in the 1990s which included bringing in outside consultants from Boeing and Delta Air Lines. In 2001, the Federal Aviation Administration upgraded South Korea's air-safety rating while Korean Air passed an International Air Transport Association audit in 2005. After the Flight 8509 accident in 1999, it was 23 years until another Korean Air aircraft crashed on landing and was written off; Korean Air Flight 631 overshot the runway at Mactan–Cebu International Airport in October 2022.

Several academics interviewed by CNBC in 2013 shared the belief that the hierarchical, linear nature of Korean social interactions could be a contributor to the airline's safety issues.

== 1960s ==
- 11 December 1969 – Korean Air Lines YS-11 hijacking: A NAMC YS-11-125 operating a domestic flight from Gangneung for Seoul when hijackers commandeered the aircraft and forced it to fly to Pyongyang, North Korea. Upon landing, the aircraft was damaged beyond repair and written off. Several passengers and crew were returned to South Korea, though eleven continued to be held in North Korea.

== 1970s ==
- 23 January 1971 – 1971 Korean Air Lines Fokker F27 hijacking: A domestic scheduled Korean Air Lines passenger flight, operated by a Fokker F27 Friendship 500 (HL5212), between Sokcho and Seoul was hijacked by a man armed with hand grenades in the sky over Hongcheon County, Gangwon Province. A security officer shot the hijacker, and as he fell, the bomb he was holding exploded, and a co-pilot blocked it with his body, cutting off his left leg and right arm, and he later died from excessive bleeding. The aircraft crash-landed on a deserted beach in Goseong County, Gangwon, South Korea. The aircraft was written off. The incident was reenacted in the film Hijack 1971 (2024) directed by Kim Seong-han.
- 2 August 1976 – Cargo Flight 642 was a cargo flight operated by a Boeing 707 that departed from Tehran for Seoul when, after takeoff from runway 29, the aircraft inexplicably deviated from the Standard Instrument Departure (SID) procedure and drifted to the right instead of performing a left turnout. It continued and struck mountains at an altitude of 6,630 feet (2.02 km; 1.26 mi). All five crew members died in the crash.
- 20 April 1978 – Flight 902, a Boeing 707, departed from Paris for Anchorage and flew within 780 km (480 mi) of the North Pole when Canadian officials alerted the crew they were off course. They changed course, but worsened the situation by setting a course directly across the Barents Sea and into Soviet airspace. The plane was initially recognized by Soviet anti-aircraft defense radars as a Boeing 747. Sukhoi Su-15TM jets were sent to intercept. When both jets were flying next to the Korean airliner, the Korean captain claimed he slowed the plane and initiated landing lights. Nevertheless, the Su-15 crews were ordered to shoot down the plane. According to US intelligence sources, the Soviet pilot tried for several minutes to convince his superiors to cancel the attack on the civilian airliner. After an additional order, two R-60 missiles were launched. The first missed but the second severely damaged the left wing and shrapnel punctured the fuselage, causing rapid decompression that killed two passengers. The Korean pilot initiated an emergency descent to 5,000 feet (1.5 km; 0.95 mi) and entered clouds. Both Soviet jets lost the Korean plane in the clouds. The aircraft continued at low altitude, crossing the Kola Peninsula while searching for a landing opportunity. With night quickly coming on, several unsuccessful attempts were made before the plane landed on the ice of Korpijärvi lake, near Kem, Russia. All of the remaining occupants were rescued by Soviet helicopters.

== 1980s ==
- 19 November 1980 – Flight 015, operated by a Boeing 747, departed from Anchorage for Seoul when the aircraft struck a retaining embankment on the edge of the airport. The plane bounced back on to runway 14, broke apart, and caught fire. 14 people on the aircraft died, along with one fatality on the ground.
- 15 September 1981 – Flight 903, a Boeing 747 originating in Seoul, South Korea, and bound for Zürich, Switzerland, was taking off from Ninoy Aquino International Airport when it overshot the runway during an aborted takeoff, hitting the airport perimeter fence. As a result, the aircraft's nose blocked traffic on the service road of South Luzon Expressway. 40 of the 352 occupants were injured.
- 1 September 1983 – Flight 007 was a Boeing 747-230B that departed from New York City for Seoul via Anchorage. After takeoff from Anchorage at 13:00 UTC, the flight was cleared directly to the Bethel VOR beacon and then on to the Romeo 20 route. The pilot mistakenly diverted from its intended course and passed 12 miles north of the Bethel beacon. While approaching the Kamchatka peninsula, six Soviet MiG-23 fighters were scrambled. Because a U.S. Air Force Boeing RC-135 intelligence plane was flying in the area east off Kamchatka, the Soviets may have assumed the 747 radar echo to be the RC-135. The flight left Soviet airspace over the Sea of Okhotsk and the fighters returned to their base. Passing abeam the Nippi beacon four hours after takeoff, the aircraft was 185 mi (298 km) off course and headed for Sakhalin. Two Soviet Su-15 'Flagon' fighters were scrambled from Dolinsk-Sokol airbase. At 18:16 UTC, Flight 007 re-entered Soviet airspace. At 18:22, for the second time, Soviet command ordered destruction of the target. Two air-to-air missiles were launched by one of the fighters and one struck the Boeing at 18:26. Cabin pressure was lost and the aircraft suffered control problems, causing the plane to spiral into the sea near Moneron Island. The event was denounced by the US Reagan Administration as a "deliberate and wanton act of murder by an evil empire." Boris Yeltsin handed the black boxes to the Federal Aviation Administration. All occupants aboard the aircraft were killed.
- 23 December 1983 – Cargo Flight 084 was operated by a McDonnell Douglas DC-10 from Anchorage to Los Angeles. While taxiing out in fog, the Korean crew became disoriented and ended up on the wrong runway. During the takeoff run, the aircraft collided head-on with South Central Air Flight 59, a Piper PA-31 which was taking off from runway 6L-24R for a flight to Kenai. The nine occupants of the South Central Air flight were injured. The DC-10 overran the runway by 1,434 feet and came to rest 40 feet right of the extended centerline. Federal investigators determined that the Korean pilot had failed to follow accepted procedures during taxi, causing disorientation while selecting the runway. The pilot also failed to use the compass to confirm his position. The aircraft was written off, though none of the involved were killed.
- 18 May 1985 – A Boeing 727 operating a domestic flight from Seoul to Jeju was in flight when a lone hijacker demanded to be taken to North Korea. After the hijacker was overpowered, the aircraft was diverted to Gwangju where he was arrested by the Korean authorities.
- 29 November 1987 – Flight 858 was a Boeing 707-3B5C operating a flight from Abu Dhabi to Bangkok. When the aircraft was 122 km (76 mi) northwest of Tavoy, Burma over the Andaman Sea, the aircraft exploded and disintegrated. All 115 occupants aboard were killed. Investigation revealed that a bomb explosion caused the crash. Two saboteurs disguised as passengers, who had deplaned at Abu Dhabi, left a radio and liquor bottle containing hidden explosives in the overhead rack at row 7. South Korea accused Kim Jong Il, son of then-North Korean leader Kim Il Sung, of ordering the 1987 bombing of Flight 858. No direct evidence has emerged to link Kim to the bombing, but a North Korean agent, Kim Hyon Hui, confessed to planting a bomb, saying the operation was ordered by Kim Jong Il personally.
- 27 July 1989 – Flight 803 was operated by a McDonnell Douglas DC-10-30. The flight originated in Seoul, bound for Tripoli, Libya with intermediate stops in Bangkok, Thailand and Jeddah, Saudi Arabia. As the aircraft prepared to land in Tripoli, visibility was varying between 1000 and 800 feet and the instrument landing system for runway 27 had been reported unserviceable. On final approach to runway 27, the aircraft crashed short of the runway, striking four houses and a number of cars. 75 occupants aboard the aircraft were killed, along with four people on the ground. 124 survived the crash and resulting fire.
- 25 November 1989 – Flight 175 was a regularly scheduled flight from Seoul to Ulsan operated by a Fokker F-28 Fellowship 4000. During takeoff, the number one engine lost power, forcing the pilots to abort the takeoff. However, the aircraft was unable to stop and overran the runway before bursting into flames. There were several injuries but no deaths. It was determined that due to improper flight preparation, icing had developed on the wings. The aircraft was unsalvageable and thus written off.

== 1990s ==
- 13 June 1991 – Flight 376, a Boeing 727 (HL7350) operating a domestic flight from Jeju to Daegu, performed an unexpected gear-up landing at Daegu. The crew failed to read out the landing procedure checklist and therefore did not select the gear down option. Subsequent investigation revealed that the pilot instructed the co-pilot to pull the fuse case from the warning system because the repeated warnings that the landing gear was not deployed were "irritating and distracting". With the warning horn disabled, the Korean pilot brought the plane in and slid down the length of the runway on the central structural rib in the belly of the aircraft. There were no serious injuries but the aircraft was written off. The police applied for an arrest warrant for the captain and the first officer, but controversy arose as the prosecutor rejected the application and investigated it without physical detention, but Joo Ho-young, a judge who later became a member of the National Assembly, said in a trial ruling held in January of the following year, "The heavy responsibility of punishment under the criminal law is inevitable that defendants who are tasked with safe transportation of passengers did not follow basic air operation rules and caused an accident that could kill all 120 passengers." Captain Lee In-sung was sentenced to October in prison, and First Officer Kim Sung-joong and Flight Engineer Park Il-sung were sentenced to August in prison, and they were arrested in court. The gear-up landing blew up the lower part of the aircraft, ultimately rendering it inoperable, and on July 27, 1992, Korean Air donated the aircraft for practical use to Inha Technical University, a member of the same Hanjin Group, after disassembling the remaining aircraft at Daegu International Airport in August 1991.
- 10 August 1994 – Flight 2033 was an Airbus A300 operating a flight from Seoul to Jeju. During the approach into Jeju, the aircraft approached faster than usual to avoid potential windshear. Fifty feet above the runway, the co-pilot who was not flying the aircraft decided that there was insufficient runway left to land and attempted to perform a go-around against the captain's wishes. The aircraft touched down 1,773 metres (1.1 mi) beyond the runway threshold. The aircraft could not be stopped on the remaining 1,227 metres (0.76 mi) of runway and overran at a speed of 104 knots. After striking the airport wall and a guard post at 30 knots, the aircraft burst into flames. The cabin crew was credited with safely evacuating all passengers although only half of the aircraft's emergency exits were usable. There were no fatalities, but the aircraft was written off following the crash.
- 22 September 1994 – Flight 916F from Zürich to Busan was operated by a Boeing 747. Eight days prior on 14 September, the aircraft had encountered a severe hailstorm over Elba, Italy, which led to a near miss incident. The aircraft sustained severe damage to the radome, cockpit windows and engines but managed to reach Zürich safely. Some repair work was done, but the aircraft needed to be ferried to Busan for final repairs. Boeing released the aircraft with some takeoff performance changes, which included a limited gross weight of 70,000 pounds (32,000 kg) and increased takeoff speeds for V1, V2 and VR by 15, 17 and 14 knots respectively. The aircraft was cleared for a Runway 14 takeoff and ZUE 5P departure. After a long takeoff run, the aircraft lifted off the runway at the very end and climbed slowly. At 900 meters beyond the runway threshold, the aircraft cleared some adjacent buildings at lengths fewer than 50 meters. Subsequent investigation found that despite clear instructions to reduce weight, the crew had overloaded the aircraft at 86,700 pounds (39,300 kg).
- 6 August 1997 – Flight 801 was a Boeing 747-3B5 operating a flight from Seoul, South Korea to Agana, Guam, The crew attempted a night-time approach to Guam's runway 06L. Flight 801 had descended 800 feet below the prescribed altitude, striking the 709 feet Nimitz Hill at a height of 650 feet and crashed in a jungle valley, breaking up and bursting into flames. 228 occupants were killed in the crash. Subsequent investigation found that the captain's failure to adequately brief and execute the non-precision approach, and the first officer's and flight engineer's failure to effectively monitor and cross-check the captain's execution of the approach, led to the crash. The incident was the first and only fatal crash involving the Boeing 747-300. Other contributing factors were the captain's fatigue and Korean Air's inadequate flight crew training.
- 5 August 1998 – Flight 8702, a Boeing 747-400 operating a short flight from Tokyo to Seoul, departed Tokyo at 16:50 and was scheduled to arrive at Seoul at 19:20. Inclement weather at Seoul forced the flight crew to divert to Jeju. The aircraft took off from Jeju at 21:07 bound for Seoul. On landing in Seoul, the 747 bounced multiple times and slid 100 meters off the runway before coming to a stop in a grassy area. There were no deaths but some were injured; the aircraft was also written off.
- 15 March 1999 – Flight 1533 was operated by a McDonnell Douglas MD-83 from Seoul to Pohang. Weather at Pohang was poor with degraded visibility and gusty 25 knot winds. The pilot failed at the first attempt to land. After the second approach, the plane touched down but overran the runway. The aircraft skidded through 10 antennas, a reinforced barbed wire fence and came to rest against an embankment. The landing broke the fuselage in half. The airline no longer operate this route as of October 3, 2023, as this route is now being operated by Jin Air.
- 15 April 1999 – Cargo Flight 6316, a cargo flight operated by a McDonnell Douglas MD-11 from Shanghai to Seoul, crashed shortly after takeoff 10 kilometers (6.2 mi) southwest of Shanghai Hongqiao International Airport. Investigations revealed that the Korean co-pilot's repeatedly misunderstood the instructions provided by the tower; the tower was relaying information in meters which the pilots confused with feet. The aircraft climbed to 4,500 feet and the captain, after receiving two wrong affirmative answers from the first officer that the required altitude should be 1,500 feet, thought that the aircraft was 3,000 feet too high. The captain then pushed the control column abruptly forward causing the aircraft to start a rapid descent. Neither was able to recover from the dive. The plane plunged to the ground, hitting housing for migrant workers and exploded. All three crew members aboard the aircraft and five on the ground were killed; 37 on the ground were also injured.
- 22 December 1999 – Korean Air Cargo Flight 8509 was operated by a Boeing 747-2B5F from London Stansted to Milan Malpensa. After takeoff from London Stansted, the aircraft banked to the left and plummeted into the ground. Subsequent investigation revealed the Captain’s ADI was faulty and that maintenance activity at London Stansted Airport was done improperly and the pilots did not respond appropriately to warnings during the climb after takeoff despite prompts from the flight engineer. The captain maintained a left roll control input, rolling the aircraft to approximately 90 degrees of left bank and there was no control input to correct the pitch attitude throughout the turn. The first officer either did not monitor the aircraft attitude during the climbing turn or, having done so, did not alert the commander to the extreme unsafe attitude that had developed. Investigators subsequently suggested, among other things, that Korean Air had altered training materials and safety education to meet the "unique" Korean culture. All four crew members were killed in the crash.

== 2010s ==
- 5 December 2014 – An air rage incident occurred aboard Flight 086 shortly before its departure from John F. Kennedy International Airport for Incheon International Airport. The incident happened aboard an Airbus A380-800, and was later known as the Nut rage incident. The issue began when Korean Air vice president Heather Cho (Cho Hyun-ah) complained about the packaging of nuts which served as a savory snack for first class passengers: Cho expected the nuts to be served on a plate, but the nuts were still in their original packaging when served. A confrontation with the cabin crew chief occurred, which led to Cho assaulting the crew member and ordering him to get off the plane, thus delaying the flight for 20 minutes.
- 27 May 2016 – An engine caught fire on a Boeing 777-300 as it accelerated for takeoff as Flight 2708 at Tokyo International Airport, commonly known as Haneda Airport. The takeoff was aborted and all 17 crew members and 302 passengers were evacuated. Firefighters put out the fire within an hour. There were 12 minor injuries during the evacuation, and the aircraft was repaired and returned to service.
- 29 June 2018 - Korean Air Flight 703, a Boeing 777-300, had an axle fracture of the aft right landing gear while landing at Narita Airport on runway 16L. There were no injuries among the 335 people on board. As a result of the accident, the runway 16L was closed for 20 minutes to clear the debris. The aircraft received minor damage.

== 2020s ==
- 28 September 2022 – Flight 908, a Boeing 777-300ER, clipped the tail of Icelandair Flight 454, a Boeing 757-200, on the ground at London Heathrow Airport. Emergency responders were called after the collision, although there were no reported fatalities or injuries among the people aboard the two aircraft. Both aircraft were repaired.
- 23 October 2022 - Flight 631, a Airbus A330-300, operating flight to Mactan–Cebu International Airport overran the runway while attempting to land after go around due to hydraulic failure. Although no injuries resulted, the aircraft was written off.
