= Korean Air Cargo Flight 6316 =

1999 aviation accident in China

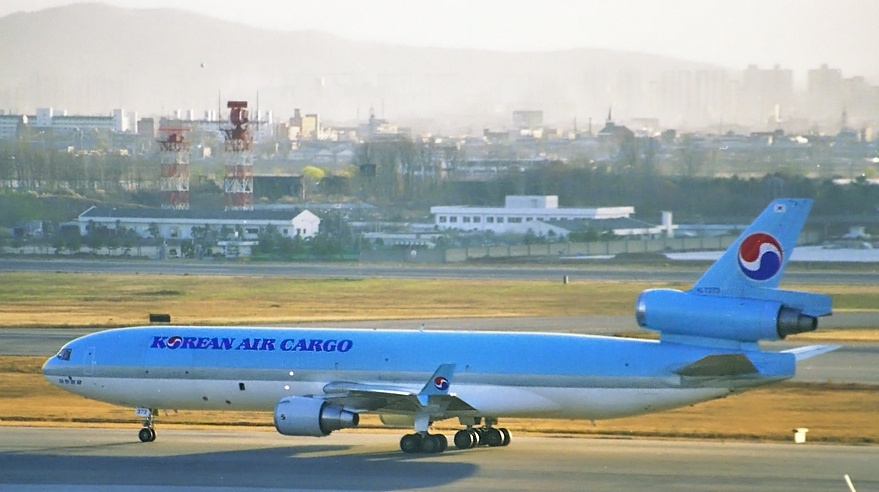
- HL7373, the aircraft involved in the accident, pictured in 1997

Accident
- Date: 15 April 1999
- Summary: Crashed during climb following loss of control due to confusion between metric and imperial measures
- Site: Xinzhuang, Minhang District, near Shanghai Hongqiao International Airport, Shanghai, China; 31°06′00″N 121°22′16″E
- Total fatalities: 8
- Total injuries: 42

Aircraft
- Aircraft type: McDonnell Douglas MD-11F
- Operator: Korean Air Cargo
- IATA flight No.: KE6316
- ICAO flight No.: KAL6316
- Call sign: KOREAN AIR 6316
- Registration: HL7373
- Flight origin: Shanghai Hongqiao International Airport, Shanghai, China
- Destination: Gimpo International Airport, Seoul, South Korea
- Occupants: 3
- Passengers: 0
- Crew: 3
- Fatalities: 3
- Survivors: 0

Ground casualties
- Ground fatalities: 5
- Ground injuries: 42

Korean Air Cargo Flight 6316 (KE6316/KAL6316) was a scheduled Korean Air Cargo freight flight from Shanghai to Seoul. On 15 April 1999, the McDonnell Douglas MD-11F operating the route, registered as HL7373, crashed in Xinzhuang, Shanghai shortly after taking off from Hongqiao Airport, killing all three crew on board, and five on the ground.

== Accident ==
Loaded with 86 tons of cargo, the MD-11F operating Flight 6316 took off from Shanghai Hongqiao Airport at around 4:00 pm. The flight crew consisted of Captain Hong Sung-sil (Korean: 홍성실; Hanja: 洪性實) (54), First Officer Park Bon-suk (박본석; 朴本錫) (35), and flight engineer Park Byong-ki (박병기; 朴炳基) (48). After taking off, the MD-11F received clearance to climb to 1,500 m (4,900 ft) after the first officer contacted Shanghai Departure.

As the aircraft climbed to 4,500 feet (1,400 m), the first officer told the captain that the required altitude should be 1,500 feet (460 m), thinking that the aircraft was 3,000 feet (910 m) too high. The captain pushed the control column abruptly forward, causing the aircraft to descend at over 34,000 feet per minute (10,000 m/min). At 4:04 pm, the aircraft became uncontrollable due to the steep dive and eventually crashed into an industrial zone in Xinzhuang, which is 10 kilometres (6.2 mi; 5.4 nmi) southwest of Hongqiao Airport. The aircraft impacted the ground and exploded. Along with the 3 South Korean crew on board, 2 pupils and 3 migrant workers on the ground also perished. The crash was recorded by the nearby Shanghai Earthquake Administration which indicated that the impact forces had generated an equivalent of a 1.6 magnitude earthquake.

== Aircraft ==
The aircraft involved was a McDonnell Douglas MD-11 freighter with the registration HL7373 and serial number 48409, powered by three Pratt & Whitney PW4460 engines. Built-in February 1992, this aircraft was delivered to Korean Air on March 24, 1992, as a passenger aircraft. In 1996, the aircraft was converted to a freighter.

== Investigation ==
On April 27, 1999, the primary investigation revealed no evidence of an explosion or mechanical failure before the impact. In June 2001, further investigation carried out by CAAC showed that the first officer had confused 1,500 metres (4,900 ft), the required altitude, with 1,500 feet (460 m), prompting the captain to make the wrong decision to descend. The captain's response was an abrupt overreaction on the flight controls, resulting in a rapid descent which was unrecoverable.

In South Korea, all aviation altitudes are measured in feet in compliance with the ICAO convention. In Russia, China and parts of Central Asia, level flight above the transition altitude is accomplished at the assigned flight level with reference to, and clearances given in, feet (eg. FL330). However, altitudes below the transition level are assigned in metres. Aircraft can fly at the assigned altitude using an altimeter that indicates in metres or, if fitted with altimeters that read in feet, by conversion of the assigned altitude/level.

== See also ==
- Korean Air incidents and accidents
  - Korean Air Cargo Flight 8509 – another Korean Air Cargo plane that crashed shortly after takeoff from London Stansted Airport eight months after the Shanghai crash.
- Air Canada Flight 143 – another aviation incident caused by the confusion between Metric and Imperial measurements
