= Korean Air Flight 175 =

1989 aviation accident in South Korea

Coordinates: 37°33′29″N 126°47′26″E

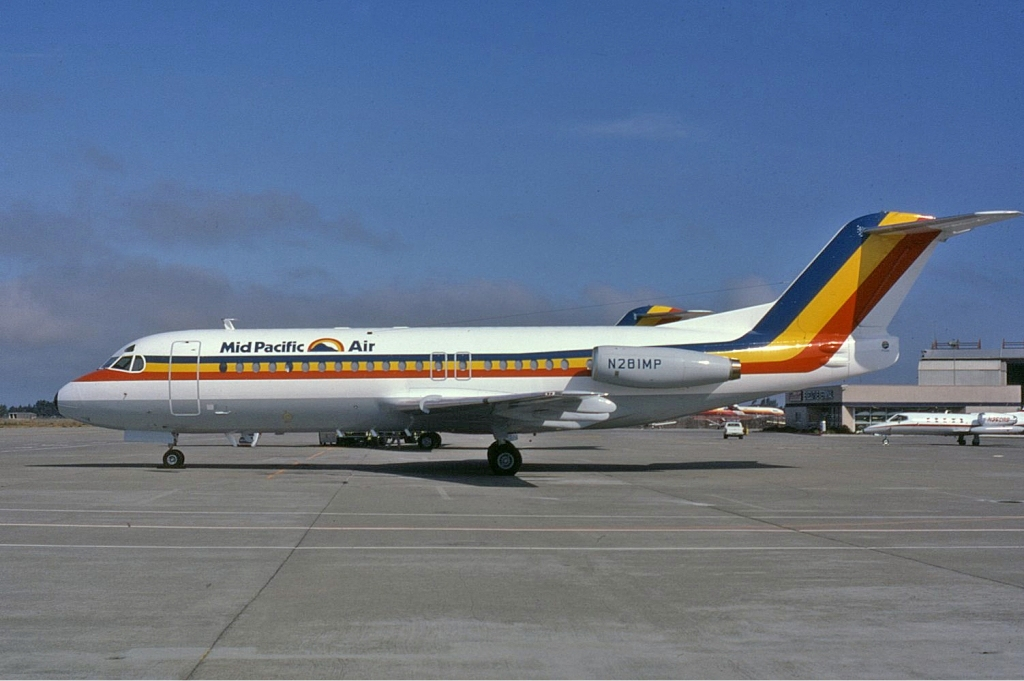
- The aircraft involved in the accident, pictured in 1985 while still in service with Mid Pacific Air

Accident
- Date: 25 November 1989
- Summary: Engine failure on takeoff caused by icing
- Site: Gimpo International Airport, Seoul, South Korea

Aircraft
- Aircraft type: Fokker F28 Fellowship 4000
- Operator: Korean Air
- IATA flight No.: KE175
- ICAO flight No.: KAL175
- Call sign: KOREAN AIR 175
- Registration: HL7285
- Flight origin: Gimpo International Airport, Seoul, South Korea
- Destination: Gangneung Airport, Gangneung, South Korea
- Occupants: 48
- Passengers: 42
- Crew: 6
- Fatalities: 1
- Injuries: 43
- Survivors: 47

On 25 November 1989, Korean Air Flight 175, a Fokker F-28 flying from Gimpo International Airport to Gangneung Airport crashed on the runway immediately after takeoff and caught fire. None of the 48 passengers and crew on board were killed, but 44 people were injured.

The aircraft's right wing broke off as well as the aircraft splitting into two. The aircraft was subsequently written off. One passenger died from injuries 12 days later.

The cause was determined to be wing icing which caused the no. 1 engine to fail when ice was ingested into the engine on takeoff.

The contributing factors were deemed as poor flight preparation on part of the flying crew and the aircraft has not been properly deiced prior to takeoff.

== See also ==
- Korean Air incidents and accidents
