= Typhoon Doug =

Pacific typhoon in 1994

Typhoon Doug (Ritang)
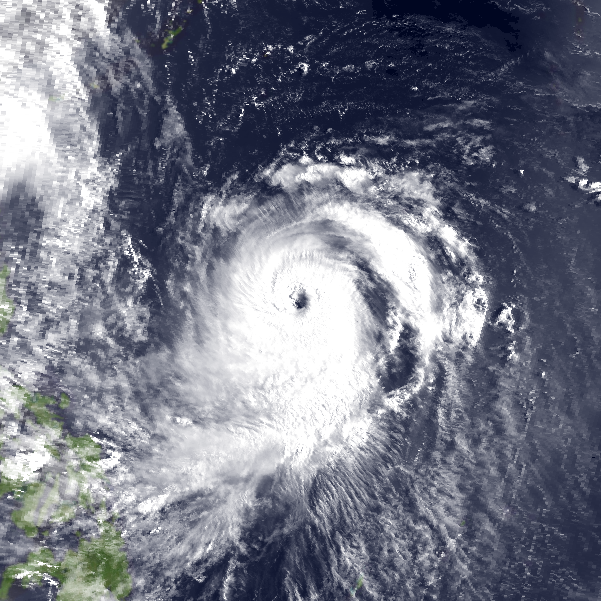
- Doug shortly after peak intensity near the Philippines on August 6

Meteorological history
- Formed: August 2, 1994
- Extratropical: August 11, 1994
- Dissipated: August 12, 1994

Very strong typhoon
- 10-minute sustained (JMA)
- Highest winds: 185 km/h (115 mph)
- Lowest pressure: 925 hPa (mbar); 27.32 inHg

Category 5-equivalent super typhoon
- 1-minute sustained (SSHWS/JTWC)
- Highest winds: 260 km/h (160 mph)
- Lowest pressure: 898 hPa (mbar); 26.52 inHg

Overall effects
- Fatalities: 26 total
- Damage: $110 million (1994 USD)
- Areas affected: Taiwan; South Korea; China
- IBTrACS
- Part of the 1994 Pacific typhoon season

Typhoon Doug, known in the Philippines as Super Typhoon Ritang, was the only Category 5 typhoon in the 1994 Pacific typhoon season. The 13th storm and the second super typhoon of the season, it formed on the eastern end of a monsoon trough and developed into a tropical depression on August 2. It moved west and rapidly strengthened. Doug reached a peak of 925 mbar (27.3 inHg) and winds of 160 mph (260 km/h) before brushing the coast of Taiwan. Doug made landfall near Shanghai, China as a weak tropical depression. Doug killed 26 people and caused $110 million (1994 USD) damage in Taiwan. Doug's effects reached Korea.

== Meteorological history ==
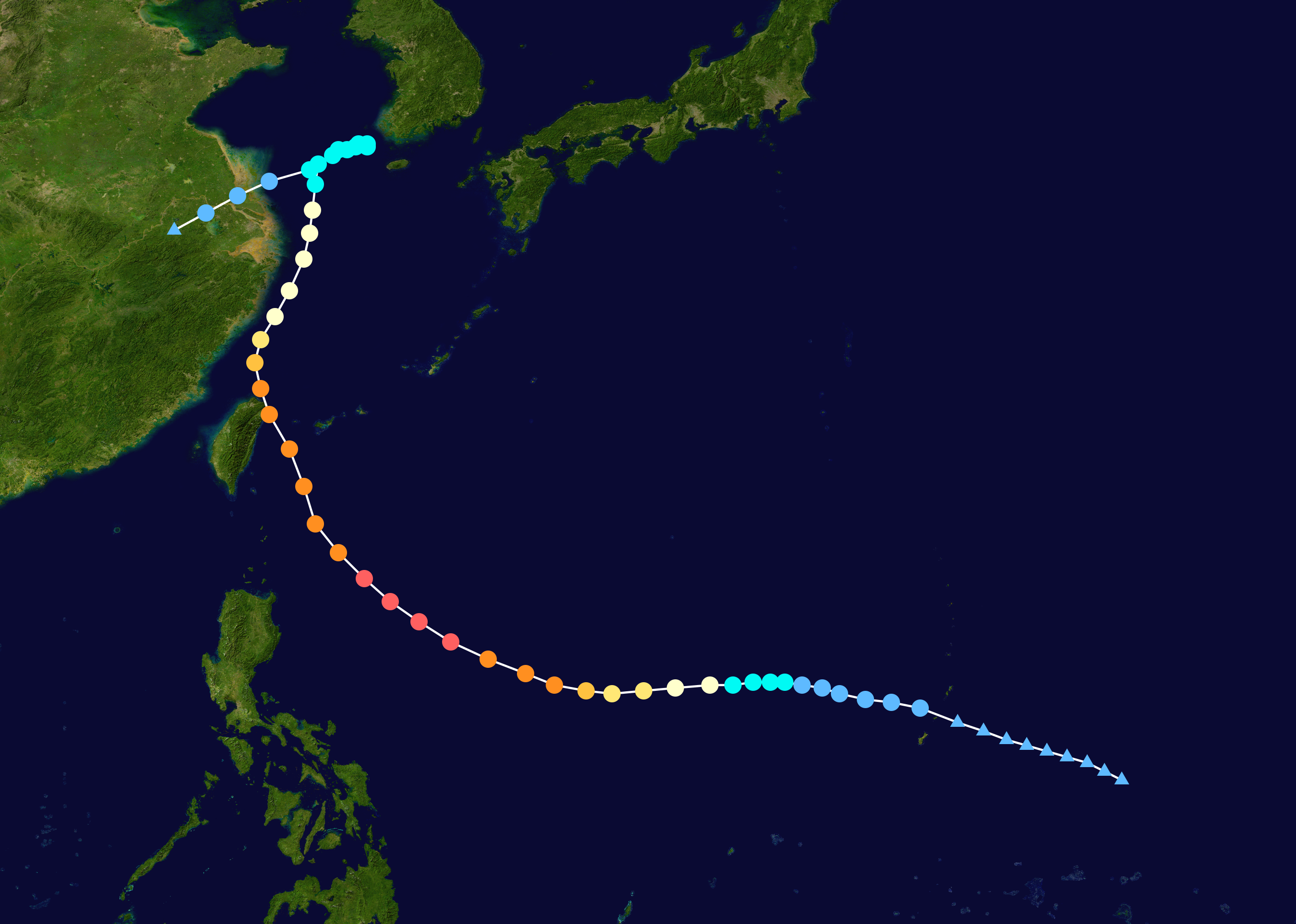
Map plotting the storm's track and intensity, according to the Saffir–Simpson scale Map key Saffir–Simpson scale Tropical depression (≤38 mph, ≤62 km/h) Tropical storm (39–73 mph, 63–118 km/h) Category 1 (74–95 mph, 119–153 km/h) Category 2 (96–110 mph, 154–177 km/h) Category 3 (111–129 mph, 178–208 km/h) Category 4 (130–156 mph, 209–251 km/h) Category 5 (≥157 mph, ≥252 km/h) Unknown Storm type Tropical cyclone Subtropical cyclone Extratropical cyclone, remnant low, tropical disturbance, or monsoon depression

A tropical disturbance west-northwest of Guam on the eastern end of a monsoon trough was first noted 500 km (310 mi) and developed into a tropical depression on August 2. It further intensified and became a tropical storm a few hours later, and the Joint Typhoon Warning Center (JTWC) assigned the system the name Doug. It moved westwards at 13 kilometres per hour (8.1 mph) and intensified, becoming a severe tropical storm on the evening of August 3. Doug further intensified and attained typhoon status about 18 hours later. An eye was becoming visible as Doug attained typhoon status. On August 6, Doug reached super typhoon intensity with maximum winds of 160 mph (260 km/h) and a minimum central barometric pressure of 925 mbar (27.3 inHg).

Super Typhoon Doug tracked northwest over the next few days and brushed northern Taiwan early on August 8. In Taiwan 26 were killed and four were reported missing. Some 126 houses collapsed and 453 others were damaged. Electricity and water supplies to 100,000 people were cut off. Flood-related damages contributed to an estimate of more than 4 billion New Taiwan dollars (1994 NT$). Super Typhoon Doug then took on a north to northeast track over the East China Sea after sweeping across northern Taiwan and started to weaken. Doug weakened to a severe tropical storm on August 9 and was downgraded to a tropical storm further on August 10. Over the next couple of days, Doug made a clockwise loop over the Yellow Sea before making landfall over Shanghai on August 11. Doug became extratropical later that day. The remnants of Doug dissipated on August 12.

== Impact ==
Two satellite dishes fell in Taipei as Doug brushed Taiwan with wind gusts of up to 89 miles per hour (143 km/h) and heavy rains. The typhoon killed 10 people and injured 41 others as the storm caused landslides that buried houses. Trees toppled and cars were swept off the road. Three people were missing and 300 were made homeless.

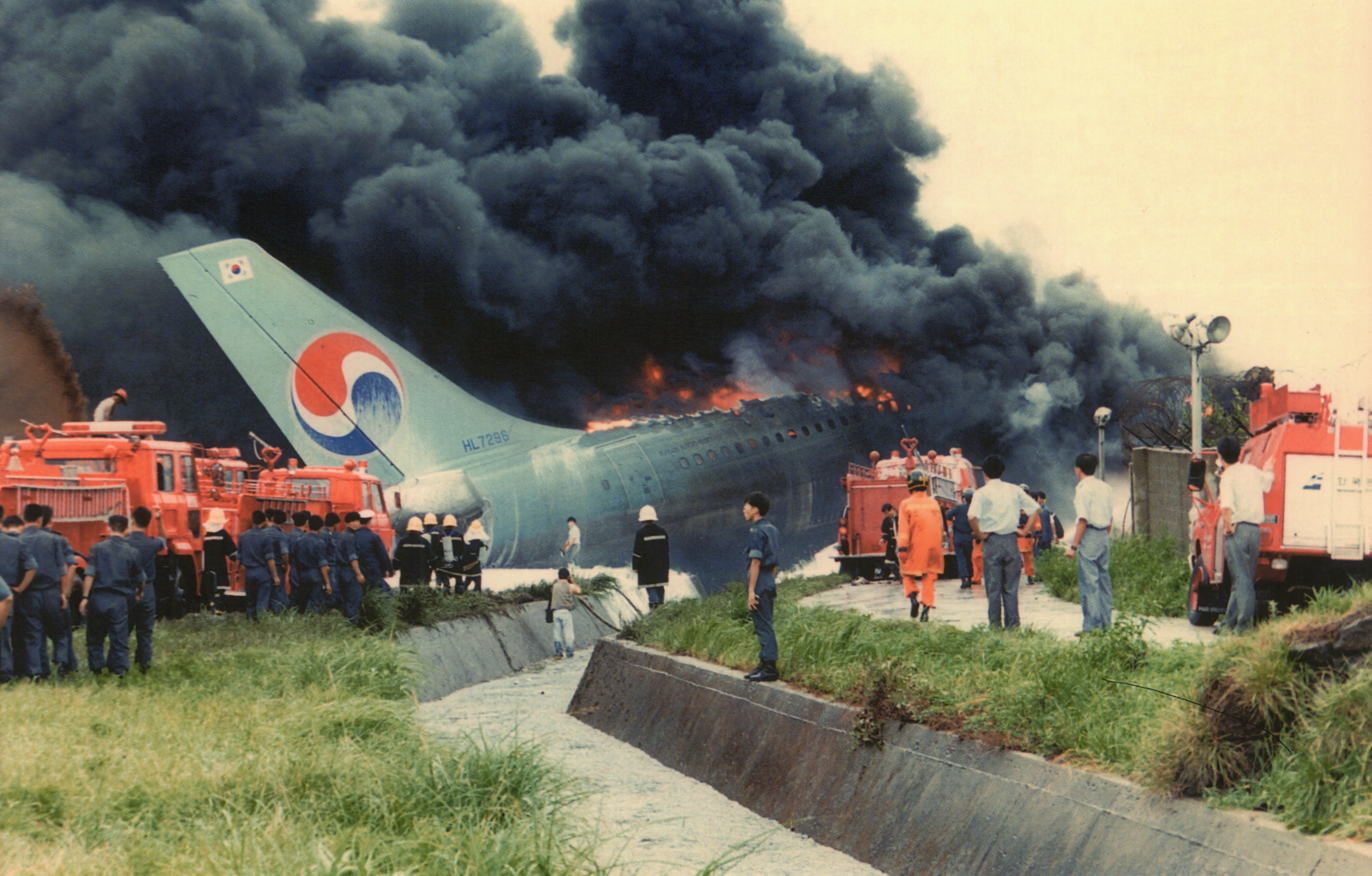
Wreckage of Korean Air Flight 2033

A Korean Air (KAL) Airbus A300, KAL 2033 skidded off the runway and exploded after trying to land on the island of Cheju, but all 160 aboard escaped without serious injury. The crew pushed the passengers down the escape chutes through the smoke and into the rain. The crash occurred shortly after 11 am when the pilot of flight 2033 from Seoul to Cheju, made a second attempt to land on the seaside runway in extremely powerful winds of up to 64 mph (103 km/h) and heavy rains. The Cheju medical clinic treated seven passengers and one crew member for minor injuries.

In total, 26 people died and damage was estimated on Taiwan was placed at $110 million (1994 USD) in the wake of Super Typhoon Doug.
