= List of accidents and incidents involving the Airbus A330 =

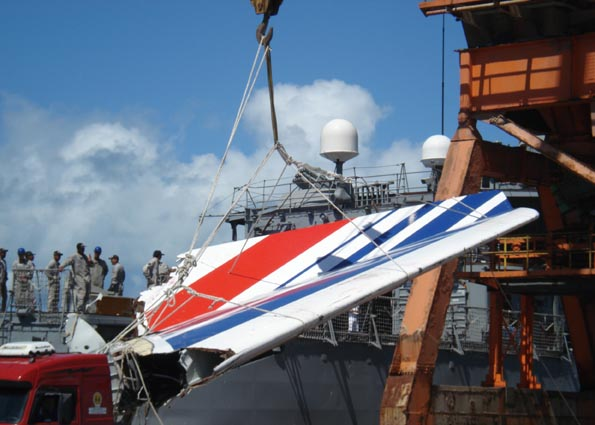
The vertical stabilizer being recovered from Air France Flight 447, the deadliest crash involving an Airbus A330

As of December 2022, the Airbus A330 had been involved in 47 aviation occurrences, including fourteen hull-loss accidents and two hijackings, for a total of 338 fatalities.

== 1990s ==
- On 30 June 1994, Airbus Industrie Flight 129, an Airbus A330-321 registered as F-WWKH, crashed at the Toulouse-Blagnac Airport while undergoing a test flight to certify its takeoff capability with a single engine failure, killing all 7 people on board. Airbus subsequently advised A330 operators to disconnect the autopilot and limit pitch attitude in the event of an engine failure at low speed.

== 2000s ==
- On 25 May 2000, Philippine Airlines Flight 812, an Airbus A330-301 registered as F-OHZN (later re-registered to RP-C3331), was hijacked near Antipolo, Rizal, Philippines. The hijacker was killed after jumping out of the aircraft, while the other 277 passengers and all 13 crew aboard survived.
- On 13 October 2000, Sabena Flight 689, an Airbus A330-231, was hijacked and ended with no casualties when Spanish police took control of the aircraft.
- On 4 December 2000, Sabena Flight 877, an Airbus A330-223, was hit by gunfire from the Hutu rebels while landing at Bujumbura International Airport. There were no fatalities, but two were injured. The aircraft was repaired.
- On 24 July 2001, two unoccupied SriLankan Airlines Airbus A330s among other aircraft were destroyed in the Bandaranaike Airport attack in Sri Lanka by the Liberation Tigers of Tamil Eelam.
- On 24 August 2001, Air Transat Flight 236, an Airbus A330-243 registered as C-GITS, developed a fuel leak over the Atlantic Ocean due to an incorrectly installed hydraulic part and was forced to glide for over 15 minutes to an emergency landing in the Azores. 18 occupants (16 passengers and two crew members) suffered injuries during the evacuation of the aircraft, with two of them suffering major injuries.
- On 7 October 2008, Qantas Flight 72, an Airbus A330-303 registered as VH-QPA, suffered a rapid loss of altitude in two sudden uncommanded pitch-down manoeuvres while 150 km (81 nmi) from the Learmonth air base in northern Western Australia. After declaring an emergency, the crew landed the aircraft safely at RAAF Base Learmonth. It was later determined that the incident, which caused 119 injuries, 14 of them serious, was the result of a design flaw of the plane's Air Data Inertial Reference Unit and a limitation of the aircraft's flight computer software.
- On 1 June 2009, Air France Flight 447, an Airbus A330-203 registered as F-GZCP, crashed in the Atlantic Ocean 640–800 kilometres (350–430 nmi) northeast of the islands of Fernando de Noronha while en route from Rio de Janeiro to Paris with 228 people on board with no survivors. Malfunctioning pitot tubes provided an early focus for the investigation, as the aircraft involved had Thales-built "–AA" models known to record faulty airspeed data during icing conditions. In July 2009, Airbus advised A330 and A340 operators to replace Thales pitots with equivalents manufactured by Goodrich. Investigators later determined that the inadequate response of the pilots to both a loss of airspeed data and subsequent autopilot disengagement resulted in Flight 447 entering into an aerodynamic stall.
- On 25 December 2009, Northwest Airlines Flight 253, an Airbus A330-323E registered as N820NW, passengers and crew subdued a man who attempted to detonate explosives in his underwear.

== 2010s ==
- On 13 April 2010, Cathay Pacific Flight 780, an Airbus A330-342 registered as B-HLL, suffered a double engine failure due to fuel contamination. The aircraft was able to make an emergency landing at Hong Kong International Airport. All 322 people on board survived, with 63 of them receiving injuries.
- On 12 May 2010, Afriqiyah Airways Flight 771, an Airbus A330-202 registered as 5A-ONG, crashed on approach to Tripoli International Airport, Libya, on a flight from OR Tambo International Airport, Johannesburg, South Africa. Of the 104 people on board, all perished but one nine-year-old Dutch boy. The cause of the crash was pilot error. Crew resource management was insufficient, sensory illusions, and the first officer's inputs to the aircraft side stick were a contributing factor in the crash. Fatigue was also named as a possible contributing factor in the accident.
- On 16 April 2012, Virgin Atlantic Flight VS27, an Airbus A330-343 registered as G-VSXY, made an emergency landing at London Gatwick Airport following intermittent flight deck warnings of smoke in the aft cargo hold. After the aircraft had come to a halt on the runway, further smoke warnings prompted the captain to order an emergency evacuation, during which 15 people sustained injuries requiring hospitalisation, with two passengers sustaining serious injuries. No evidence of smoke or fire was found, and the cause was later determined to be a fault in one of the cargo hold smoke detectors.
- On 8 September 2013, Thai Airways International Flight 679, an Airbus A330-321 registered as HS-TEF, named Song Dao, arriving from Guangzhou Baiyun International Airport excursed from the runway from runway 19L while landing at Suvarnabhumi Airport, with extensive damage to the airplane and the runway and minor injuries to 14 occupants. Preliminary investigation determined the cause of the accident to be the right landing gear collapsing as a result of a damaged bogie. No one was seriously injured, but the aircraft was written off.
- Between 14 and 20 July 2014, Three A330s of Libyan Airlines and Afriqiyah Airways were damaged during the 2014 Libyan civil war. One of the Afriqiyah aircraft was completely destroyed.
- On 3 March 2015, Turkish Airlines Flight 726, an Airbus A330-303 registered as TC-JOC, departed the runway on landing at Tribhuvan International Airport, Kathmandu, Nepal. The aircraft was severely damaged when its nose gear collapsed, causing damage to the fuselage and both wings. There were 224 passengers and 11 crew members on board; one passenger received minor injuries during the evacuation. The aircraft was written off. TC-JOC was preserved at Aircraft Museum Kathmandu in November 2017.
- On 27 August 2019, Air China Flight 183, an Airbus A330-343 registered as B-5958, caught fire while boarding at the gate at Beijing Capital International Airport. The passengers and crew were safely evacuated. The aircraft was written off.

== 2020s ==
- On 4 June 2020, China Airlines Flight 202, an Airbus A330-302 registered as B-18302, from Shanghai Pudong International Airport to Taipei Songshan Airport with 76 passengers and 11 crew, landed on Songshan's wet runway 10, when upon touchdown all three primary flight computers, thrust reversers and autobrake systems failed affecting the stopping distance of the aircraft. The crew applied maximum manual braking and managed to stop the aircraft 10 meters/33 feet ahead of the runway end (runway length 2600 meters/8530 feet). The aircraft was towed to the apron.
- On 23 October 2022, Korean Air Flight 631, an Airbus A330-322 registered as HL7525, overran the runway at Mactan–Cebu International Airport, following two go-arounds due to wet and windy weather conditions. The aircraft suffered a nose gear collapse and struck a localizer antenna. The aircraft was written off, although no fatalities or injuries were reported.
- On 12 December 2022, an Airbus A330neo on delivery to Condor was damaged during manoeuvres on the ground as it hit a building under tow, causing a fuel leak at Toulouse Airport.
- On 18 December 2022, Hawaiian Airlines Flight 35, an Airbus A330-243 registered as N393HA, encountered severe turbulence when descending into Honolulu Airport. There were 36 reported injuries with 11 of them serious. The aircraft made a safe landing at 10:46 local time where it was met with emergency personnel.
- On 15 April 2023, a Saudia A330 registered HZ-AQ30 was destroyed in Sudan bombings during an ongoing military coup.
- On 31 October 2023, A Lufthansa Airbus A330-343, registration D-AIKS performing flight LH-595 from Abuja to Frankfurt/Main, was accelerating for takeoff from Abuja's runway 22 when the aircraft collided with an animal on the runway prompting the crew to reject takeoff at high speed (about 100 knots). The aircraft slowed safely and returned to the apron. One of the aircraft’s engines needed to be replaced and damage was reported to the nosecone and flaps.
- On 31 May 2024, an Air France Airbus A330-203, registered as F-GZCL, named "Chenonceaux" suffered a severe damage to its fuselage when parked at N'djamena Chad Airport in Chad due to the strong wind from a cumulonimbus causing the plane to pivot on the main gear, which led to the nose gear to move more than a meter to the right colliding with the high loader assigned to loading containers. The aircraft was then retired from the fleet the following day after serving 21 years with the company.
- On 6 May 2025, a Yemenia A330-202 registered as 7O-AFE was destroyed on the ground at Sanaa International Airport during an Israeli airstrike.
- On 29 March 2026, a Delta Air Lines Flight DL104, an Airbus A330-323 registered as N813NW, operating from São Paulo–Guarulhos International Airport in Brazil to Hartsfield–Jackson Atlanta International Airport in the United States, suffered a fire in its No. 1 engine shortly after takeoff from runway 10L. The crew declared an emergency and returned to Guarulhos, where the aircraft landed safely without further incident and with no reported injuries. Burning debris from the engine reportedly fell onto grass near the runway, causing a small brush fire and temporarily disrupting airport operations, while Brazilian aviation accident authority CENIPA opened an investigation into the serious incident.
