= Copa Airlines Flight 201 =

1992 aviation accident in Panama

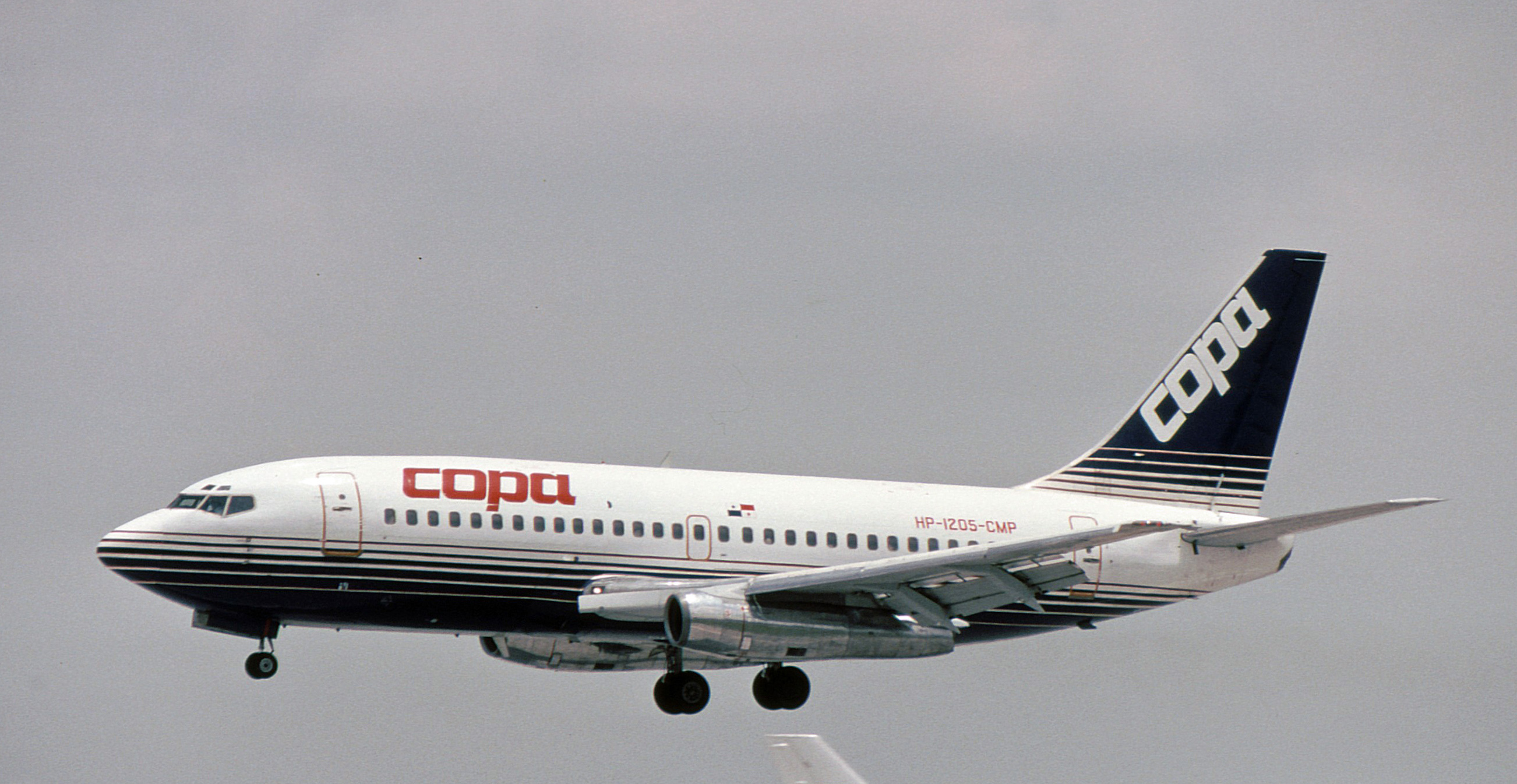
- HP-1205-CMP, the aircraft involved in the accident, photographed in April 1992

Accident
- Date: 6 June 1992
- Summary: Instrument malfunction leading to pilot error, resulting in in-flight breakup
- Site: Darién Gap, near Tucutí, Panama; 7°54′42″N 78°1′18″W

Aircraft
- Aircraft type: Boeing 737-204 Advanced
- Operator: Copa Airlines
- IATA flight No.: CM201
- ICAO flight No.: CMP201
- Call sign: COPA 201
- Registration: HP-1205CMP
- Flight origin: Tocumen International Airport
- Destination: Alfonso Bonilla Aragón International Airport
- Occupants: 47
- Passengers: 40
- Crew: 7
- Fatalities: 47
- Survivors: 0

Copa Airlines Flight 201 was a regularly scheduled passenger flight from Tocumen International Airport in Panama City, Panama, to Alfonso Bonilla Aragón International Airport in Cali, Colombia. On 6 June 1992, the Boeing 737-200 operating the route rolled, entered a steep dive, disintegrated in mid-air, and crashed into the jungle of the Darién Gap 29 minutes after takeoff, killing all 47 people on board. The in-flight breakup was caused by faulty instrument readings and several other contributing factors, including incomplete training.

Flight 201 is the deadliest accident in Panamanian aviation history, and the only fatal crash in the history of Copa Airlines.

== Background ==
The aircraft was a 12-year-old Boeing 737-200 Advanced registered HP-1205CMP. It had been leased to Copa from Britannia Airways just two months before the crash and held full Britannia Airways livery but with the Copa branding. The flight crew consisted of Captain Rafael Carlos Chial (53), First Officer Cesareo Tejada (25), and five flight attendants. The Captain had 23,750 flight hours and 7,000 hours on the 737. The Co-pilot had 3,450 flight hours and 1,600 hours on the 737.

== Accident ==
Location of the accident and departure/destination airports

Flight 201 took off from runway 21L at Tocumen International Airport in Panama City at 8:37 pm local time as a scheduled passenger flight to Cali, Colombia, with 40 passengers and 7 crew members. Among the passengers were Colombian merchants conducting business in Panama. At 8:47 pm, about 10 minutes after takeoff, Captain Chial contacted Panama City Air Traffic Control, requesting weather information. The controller reported that there was an area of very bad weather 30–50 miles (26–43 nmi; 48–80 km) ahead of their position.

At 8:48 pm, Captain Chial made another radio contact requesting permission to fly a different route due to the severe weather ahead. The new route would take the plane over Darién Province. One minute later, at 8:49 pm, Panama City ATC received a third message from Captain Chial, who reported reaching their cruising flight level of 250 (about 25,000 feet or 7,600 metres).

Problems with the aircraft began shortly before completion of the return to course after diverting around the storm. Due to a short circuit, the plane's ADI began to display false attitude data to the pilots, confusing them as to the aircraft's actual position. At 8:56 pm, Flight 201 entered a steep dive at an angle of 80 degrees to the right, rolling uncontrollably while accelerating towards the ground. Despite the attempts by Captain Chial and First Officer Tejada to level off, the airplane continued its steep dive until it exceeded the speed of sound and started to break apart at 10,000 feet (3,000 m). Flight 201 crashed into an area of jungle within the Darien Gap at 486 knots (900 km/h; 559 mph), killing all 47 onboard. Most of the recovered bodies had their clothes torn off, indicating they had been thrown from the aircraft during the dive.

At 8:57 pm, Tocumen Air Traffic Control tried unsuccessfully to make contact with the flight until it received a radio message from a KLM DC-10 aircraft that was approaching the airport, reporting that they intercepted a distress signal from Flight 201's transponder in an area between the Colombian border and Darien Province, several kilometres away from their position. After several unsuccessful attempts to contact the lost plane, Tocumen ATC finally declared a full emergency in the airport and informed the Colombian ATC centre at Bogota about the missing plane. At dawn the next day, search aircraft were sent to Flight 201's last known position.

After 8 hours, searchers spotted the first pieces of wreckage in the jungle of the Darien Gap. Because of the remoteness of the area and the difficulty of access, it took rescue personnel 12 hours to reach the site.

Because the bodies of the victims and various parts of the aircraft's fuselage were scattered in a radius of 10 kilometres (6 mi), the recovery process was extremely difficult. After investigators reached the crash site, the investigation to find the cause of the crash began.

== Nationalities of the victims ==
The aircraft was carrying 47 people: 40 passengers and a crew of seven. Fatalities included 36 Colombians, 8 Panamanians, 2 Americans, and 1 Italian.

Nationality	Passengers	Crew	Total
Colombia	36	0	36
Panama	1	7	8
United States	2	0	2
Italy	1	0	1
Total	40	7	47

== Examination and investigation ==
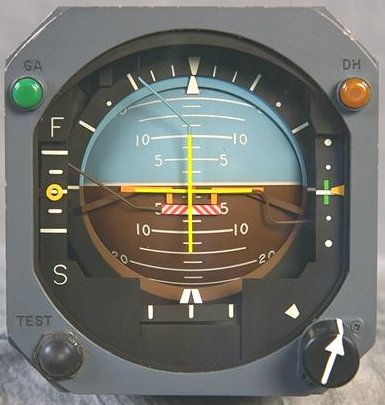
An Attitude Director Indicator with integrated localiser and glideslope and split-cue flight director command bar indicators. Due to a short circuit, the indicators on flight 201 showed faulty readings, confusing the pilots.

The cockpit voice recorder was recovered and flown to Panama City, then to the United States, for analysis by the National Transportation Safety Board. However, NTSB analysts discovered that the tape was broken due to a maintenance error. It was repaired, but the recording on the tape was from another flight. Crash investigators had better luck with the flight data recorder, which showed the plane was in a high-speed dive before breaking up. The FDR also showed that the aircraft suddenly banked several times in less than a second, which was considered unprecedented for a commercial aircraft.

The trouble was later traced to a faulty wiring harness in the Attitude Director Indicator (ADI) instruments. The wires were frayed due to damage by long-term over-stress, which caused an intermittent short circuit in the flow of data from the Captain’s side Vertical Gyro, known as VG-1, to its corresponding ADI. Because the FDR received information from VG-1, it was displaying incorrect information, and "sudden" bankings of the aircraft, which the FDR recorded, were, in fact, much more gradual.

This issue was compounded by other factors on the accident flight. There are two main ADI displays, fed independently by their own VG – one ADI/VG pair for the Captain, and a separate pair for the First Officer. If one of the VGs is malfunctioning, the crew can manually switch either ADI to use the other VG. The switch for the Captain's ADI was found in the "Both on VG-1" position, indicating that both ADIs were being fed data from the Captain's faulty VG. As a consequence, both ADIs would momentarily stay unchanged (no new data making it through), leading the crew to believe the plane was still flying in a particular attitude, prompting a further control input by the crew to correct what they saw as an upset. In essence, the ADIs told the crew that the plane was still banking left, resulting in more pilot input to the right. This reaction rolled the aircraft to almost 80 degrees, causing it to go into a steep dive, with no chance of recovery.

In addition to the above, the 737 has a third, backup ADI/VG pair, completely independent from the other two. The investigation team found that this backup ADI was, in all probability, available to the pilots during the intermittent failure of the pilots' ADIs (the post-impact damage of the stand-by indicator showed that it was operating properly up to impact with the ground). It would seem, however, that the backup ADI was not used to identify the problem, possibly due to inadequate cross-checking by the crew. As the CVR was damaged prior to the flight, it is not known whether the differences between the pilots’ ADIs and the backup were noticed or discussed.

Another factor contributing to the crash was that Copa Airlines' ground training simulator program was ineffective, as it did not present enough information relating to differences between aircraft in its fleet or crew resource management, both of which would have helped its flight crews recognize and overcome intermittent ADI faults. Notably, the simulator used for this training had a different configuration for the ADI switch, where flipping it to the left put both ADI on the backup VG. On the accident aircraft, that same action corresponded to the "Both on VG-1" position that the switch was found in. Thus, when the pilots attempted to apply their simulator training for ADI-related failures, they unknowingly disconnected the functioning VG-2, leaving them unable to correctly diagnose the problem.

Despite bearing some similarities to other incidents related to the Boeing 737 during the 1990s (such as United Airlines Flight 585), the possibility of rudder deflection in flight was discarded as a possible cause of the crash. However, Flight 201 was registered in the category of "accidents related to suspicious rudder deflection".

=== Eyewitness accounts ===
In the morning of the next day, Colombian and Panamanian radio stations were reporting that some residents of Tucutí and other villages nearby to the crash site said that on the night of the accident they felt a very strong explosion; meanwhile, others said that they saw a burning object that was falling from the sky towards the jungle.

However, these reports were eventually dismissed by the head of Panama's civil aviation authority, Zosimo Guardia, who argued that the plane could not have exploded before crashing.

== Aftermath ==
=== Response from Copa Airlines ===
In the wake of the disaster, Copa gave flights to Panama City to the families of the victims; the main executive members of Copa Holdings declared a permanent emergency meeting session at the airline's main headquarters in Panama City.

Copa Airlines had to strengthen its training program for flight crews: in particular, for pilots learning to fly different types of aircraft, and in several skills such as overcoming intermittent Attitude Director Indicator (ADI) errors and the ability to maintain control of the aircraft during instrument failures in adverse weather conditions. Copa also had to reconfigure the operations of its fleet via a major overhaul.

The accident remains the deadliest plane crash in Panamanian aviation and Copa Airlines' history as of 2026.

=== Lawsuits ===
As a result of the accident, the relatives of those who perished in the crash filed 49 wrongful death lawsuits against Lucas Aerospace, one of the part suppliers of the Boeing 737. The case was settled out of court for an undisclosed amount.

In 1993, one of the relatives of Clariza Bernal Luna, one of the US passengers that were on the flight, filed a lawsuit against Copa Airlines in a Texas federal court, alleging that the airline had sold a ticket to the passenger through a travel agency in Houston, although the airline has no operations centre in Texas. The case was eventually dismissed by the court on 30 March 1994.

== Media coverage ==
A year after the crash, the story of the crash of Flight 201 and its investigation was featured in a WGBH, BBC, and NDR documentary. It was screened in the United States in the PBS NOVA series as Mysterious Crash of Flight 201 on 30 November 1993, and in the United Kingdom in the Horizon series as Air Crash - The Deadly Puzzle on 14 February 1994.

The crash was also the subject of a Season 14 episode of the Discovery Channel/National Geographic series Mayday. The episode featuring Flight 201, titled "Sideswiped", premiered in March 2015.

== See also ==
• Lauda Air Flight 004 Mid flight break up and crashed into rural mountain similar to Copa 201 crash.

- Sriwijaya Air Flight 182
- West Air Sweden Flight 294
- Air India Flight 855
- List of accidents and incidents involving airliners by location
