= Air India Flight 855 =

1978 aviation accident in the Arabian Sea

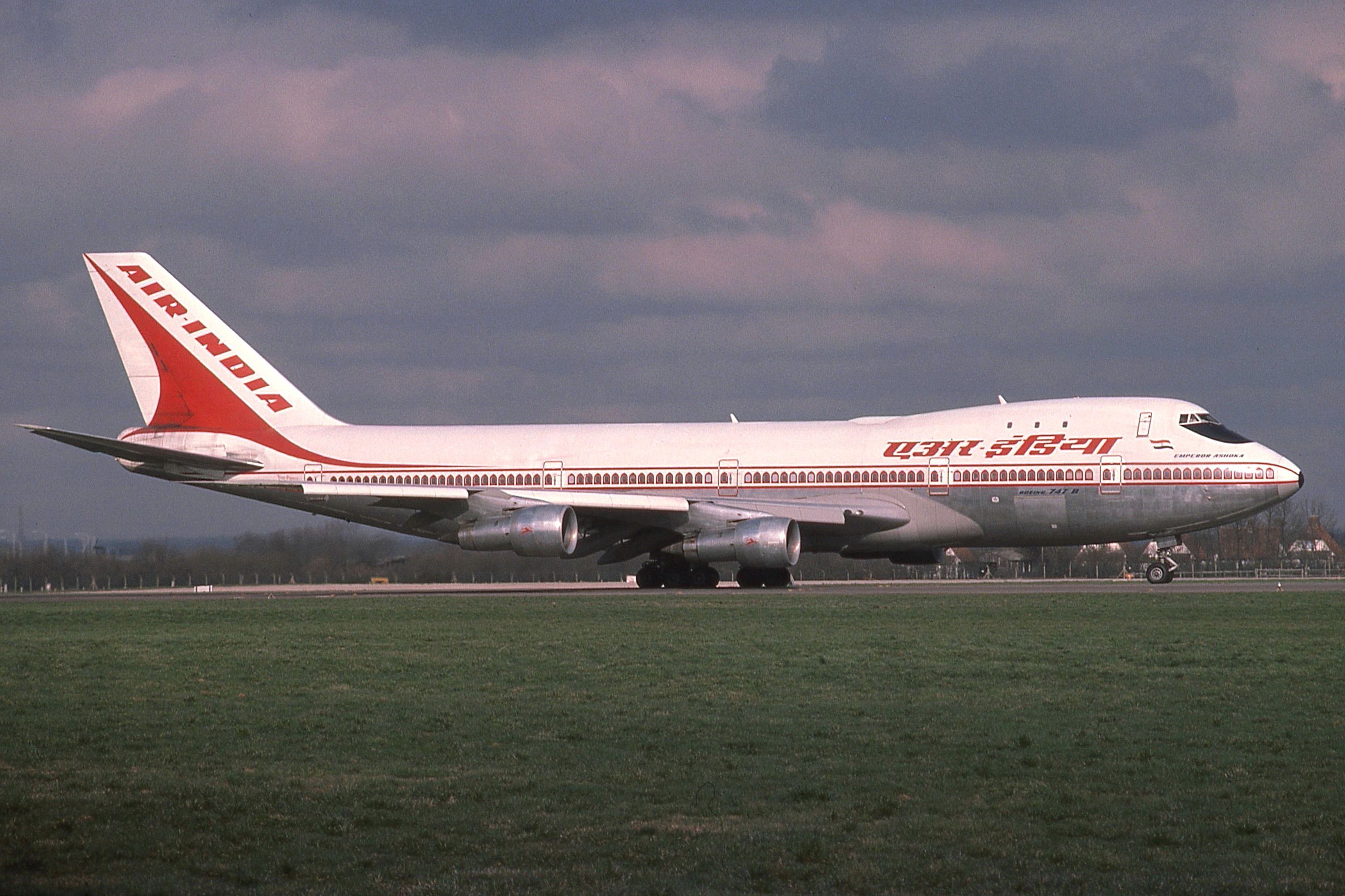
- VT-EBD, the aircraft involved in the accident, seen in 1977

Accident
- Date: 1 January 1978
- Summary: Loss of control at night following pilot error, and spatial disorientation due to instrument malfunction
- Site: Arabian Sea, 3 km (1.9 mls) west of Santacruz Airport, Bombay, India.; 18.975°N 72.1592°E

Aircraft
- Aircraft type: Boeing 747-237B
- Aircraft name: Emperor Ashoka
- Operator: Air India
- IATA flight No.: AI855
- ICAO flight No.: AIC855
- Call sign: AIRINDIA 855
- Registration: VT-EBD
- Flight origin: Chattrapati Shivaji Maharaj International Airport/Santacruz Airport, Bombay, India
- Destination: Dubai International Airport, Dubai, United Arab Emirates
- Occupants: 213
- Passengers: 190
- Crew: 23
- Fatalities: 213
- Survivors: 0

Air India Flight 855 was a scheduled passenger flight from Bombay (now Mumbai), India, to Dubai, United Arab Emirates. On 1 January 1978, the Boeing 747 operating the flight crashed into the Arabian Sea about 3 km (1.9 mi; 1.6 nmi) off the coast of Bandra, less than two minutes after take-off, killing all 213 passengers and crew on board. An investigation into the crash determined the most likely probable cause was the captain becoming spatially disoriented and losing control of the aircraft after the failure of one of the flight instruments. It was Air India's deadliest air disaster until it was surpassed nearly 7 and a half years later by the bombing of Flight 182 and was the deadliest airliner accident in Indian history until it was surpassed nearly 19 years later by the Charkhi Dadri mid-air collision.

== Aircraft and crew ==
The aircraft involved, manufactured in 1971, was a Boeing 747-237B (Note: The aircraft was a Boeing 747-200B model; Boeing assigns a unique code for each company that buys one of its aircraft, which is applied as a suffix to the model number at the time the aircraft is built, hence "747-237B" for a Boeing 747-200B built for Air India.) named Emperor Ashoka and registered as VT-EBD. This particular 747 was the first aircraft of this type in the Air India’s fleet, with a seating configuration of 16 First Class, 40 Business Class, and 338 Economy seats.

The flight crew consisted of the following people:

- The captain was 51-year old Madan Lal Kukar. He had joined Air India in 1956, and was experienced, having almost 18,000 flight hours.
- The first officer was 43-year-old Indu Virmani, a former Indian Air Force Wing Commander who joined Air India in 1976. He had more than 4,500 flight hours.
- The flight engineer was 53-year-old Alfredo Faria, who joined Air India in 1955 and had 11,000 flight hours, making him one of Air India's most senior flight engineers at the time of the accident.

== Accident ==
The aircraft departed from Bombay's Santa Cruz Airport (later Sahar Airport, now called Chhatrapati Shivaji Maharaj International Airport). The destination was Dubai International Airport in Dubai.

Approximately one minute after takeoff from runway 27, Captain Kukar made a scheduled right turn upon crossing the Bombay coastline over the Arabian Sea, after which the aircraft briefly returned to a normal level position. Soon it began rolling to the left, and never regained level flight.

The cockpit voice recorder recovered from the wreckage revealed that Captain Kukar was the first to notice a problem, when he said, "What's happened here, my instruments ..." The captain was explaining that his attitude direction indicator (ADI) had "toppled", meaning that it was still showing the aircraft in a right bank. First Officer Virmani, whose presumably functional ADI was now showing a left bank (and not noticing the captain's concern), said, "Mine has also toppled, looks fine." It is believed that the Captain mistakenly took this to mean that both primary ADIs were indicating a right bank, in effect confirming what he believed he was seeing. It was after sunset and the aircraft was flying over a dark Arabian Sea, leaving the aircrew unable to visually cross-check their ADI instrument readings with the actual horizon outside the cockpit windows.

The Boeing 747 had a third backup ADI in the centre instrument panel between the two pilots, and the transcripts of the cockpit conversation showed Flight Engineer Faria telling the captain, "Don't go by that one, don't go by that one..." trying to direct his attention towards that third ADI, or perhaps to another instrument called the turn and bank indicator, just five seconds before the aircraft impacted the sea.

The captain's mistaken perception of the aircraft's attitude resulted in him using the aircraft flight control system to add more left bank and left rudder, causing the Boeing 747 to roll further left into a bank of 108 degrees and rapidly lose altitude. Just 101 seconds after leaving the runway, the jet hit the Arabian Sea at an estimated 35-degree nose-down angle. There were no survivors among the 190 passengers and 23 crew members.

== Investigation ==
The partially recovered wreckage revealed no evidence of explosion, fire, or any electrical or mechanical failure; and an initial theory of sabotage was ruled out.

The investigation concluded that the probable cause was "due to the irrational control inputs by the captain following complete unawareness of the attitude as his ADI had malfunctioned. The crew failed to gain control based on the other flight instruments."

US Federal District Judge James M. Fitzgerald, in a 139-page decision issued 1 November 1985, rejected charges of negligence against the Boeing Company, Lear Siegler Inc, the manufacturer of the attitude director indicator, and the Collins Radio division of Rockwell International, which manufactured the backup system in a suit related to the crash. Steven C. Marshall, the attorney for Boeing asserted that the crash had been caused by Captain Madan Kukar, who he said was "flying illegally under the influence of diabetic drugs, a condition compounded by his alcoholic intake and dieting in the 24 hours before the flight," and not due to equipment malfunctions. The suit was dismissed in 1986.

== See also ==
- List of deadliest aircraft accidents and incidents
- Sensory illusions in aviation
- Similar accidents and incidents:
  - Korean Air Cargo Flight 8509 another Boeing 747-200 that crashed after takeoff from London Stansted under very similar circumstances, all 4 aboard killed, in December 1999.
  - Sriwijaya Air Flight 182 a 737-500 which crashed into the Java Sea 4 minutes after takeoff, all 62 aboard killed in January 2021.
