= Korean Air Flight 2033 =

1994 Airbus A300 crash in South Korea

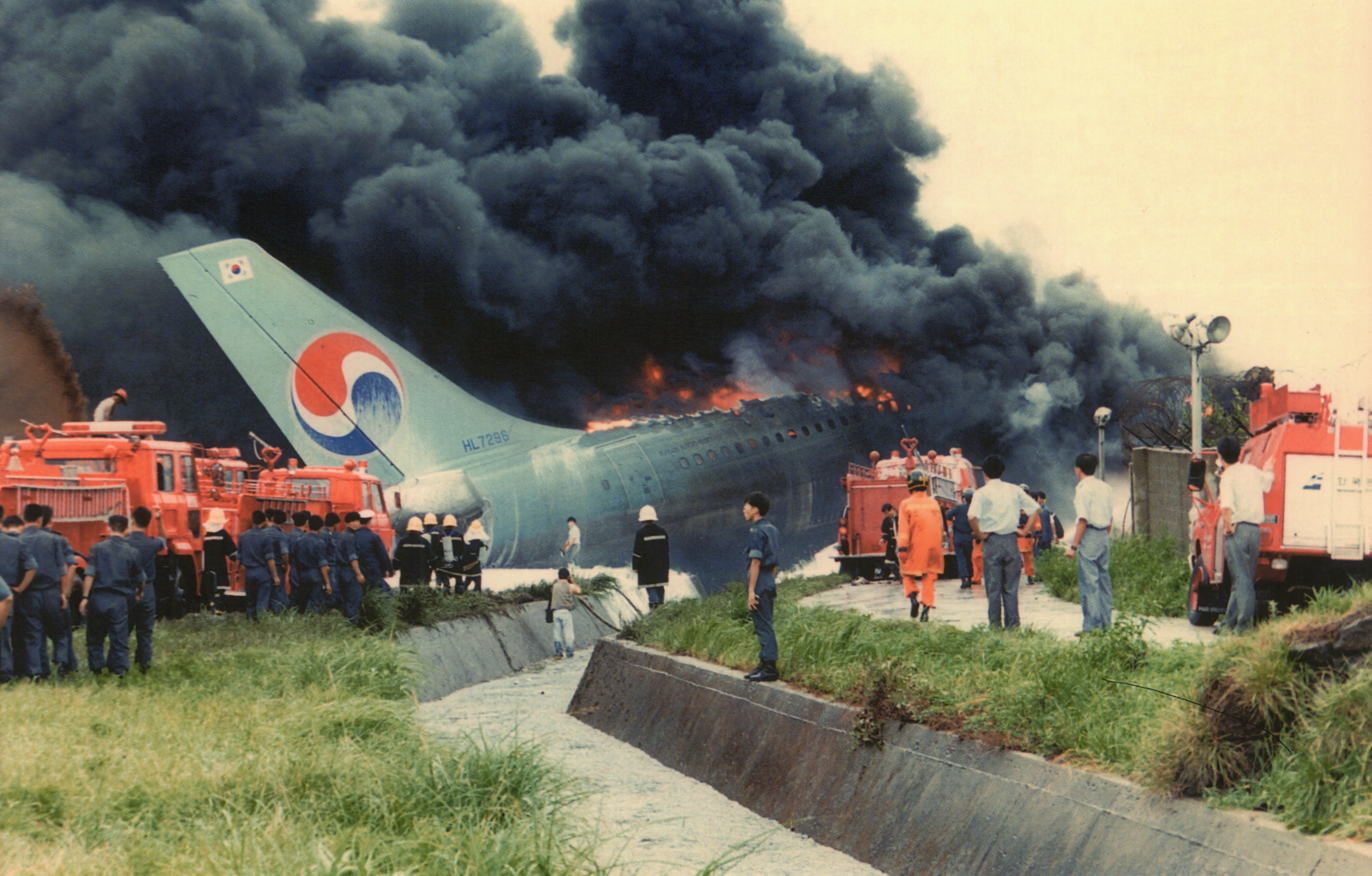
- The burning wreckage of the plane at the crash site.

Accident
- Date: 10 August 1994
- Summary: Runway overrun on landing
- Site: Jeju International Airport, Jeju, South Korea; 33°30′59″N 126°30′02″E

Aircraft
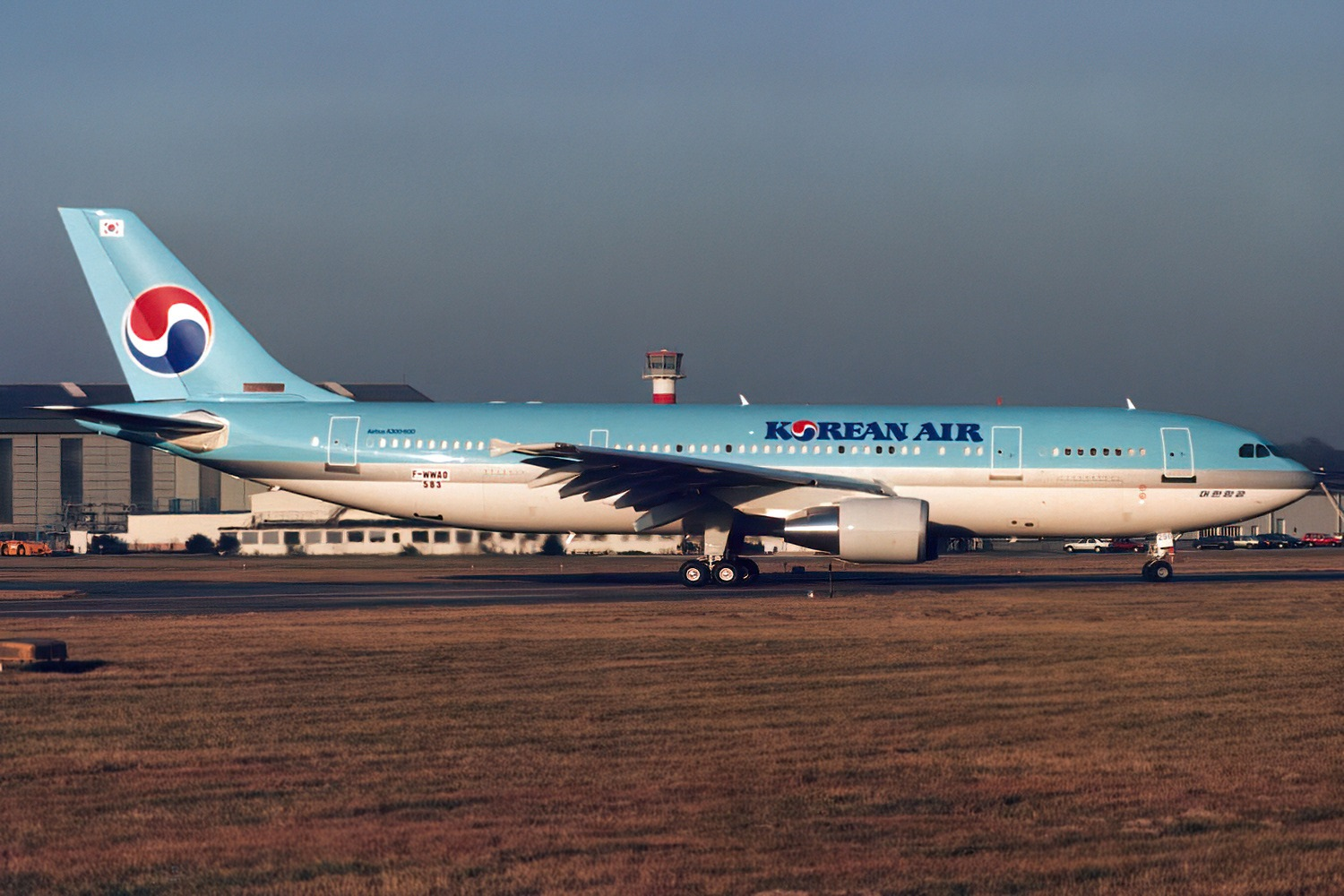
- The aircraft involved in the accident, pictured in 1991 with a test registration
- Aircraft type: Airbus A300B4-622R
- Operator: Korean Air
- IATA flight No.: KE2033
- ICAO flight No.: KAL2033
- Call sign: KOREAN AIR 2033
- Registration: HL7296
- Flight origin: Kimpo International Airport, Seoul, South Korea
- Destination: Jeju International Airport, Jeju, South Korea
- Occupants: 160
- Passengers: 152
- Crew: 8
- Fatalities: 0
- Injuries: 8
- Survivors: 160

Korean Air Flight 2033 was a scheduled passenger flight from Seoul to Jeju, South Korea. On 10 August 1994, the Airbus A300 serving the route overran the runway on landing at Jeju International Airport in poor weather and burst into flames. All 160 people on board escaped without serious injury, but the aircraft was destroyed.

== History of the flight ==
On the morning of 10 August, Korean Air Flight 2033 departed from Gimpo International Airport in Seoul for a one-hour and ten minute domestic flight to Jeju. On board were 152 passengers and 8 crew.

On arrival at Jeju, shortly after 11:00 local time, the weather was poor, with driving rain and winds of up to 56 knots (29 m/s; 104 km/h; 64 mph) brought about by Typhoon Doug. The crew aborted their first approach. On their second attempt, the flaps were selected at a reduced setting (CONF3) due to the risk of windshear, which meant that the approach speed was higher than usual.

The aircraft touched down more than halfway down the runway, and was unable to stop within the remaining distance. It overran the end of the runway at a speed of 104 knots (193 km/h; 120 mph), struck the airport wall and a guard post at 30 knots (56 km/h; 35 mph), broke up and caught fire. All crew and passengers managed to safely evacuate via the emergency slides, before the fire consumed most of the aircraft. Only eight of the occupants suffered injuries, all minor ones.

== Background ==
=== Aircraft ===
The aircraft involved was a twin-jet Airbus A300B4-622R with South-Korean registration HL7296. It was delivered in 1990, and at the time of the accident was less than four years old.

=== Crew ===
In command was 52-year-old Canadian Captain Barry Edward Woods and the first officer was 36-year-old Korean Chung Chan-kyu (Korean: 정찬규).

== Aftermath ==
External videos
- CVR Korean Air 2033 on YouTube

In the days after the accident, both Woods and Chung were arrested on suspicion of causing the accident by fighting over the controls. According to South Korean authorities, the first officer had attempted to initiate a go-around while the captain was determined to land the aircraft and bring it to a full stop.

Cockpit voice recorder transcript
- F/O: Runway in sight, runway in sight.
- CAP: I got it, I got it.
- F/O: Okay. Right side? Right?

(GPWS warning: Four hundred [feet])

- CAP: Yeah....Okay. Give me the, uh, four hundred [feet]...three...minimum sink rate.

(GPWS warning: Three hundred [feet])

(GPWS warning: SINK RATE)

- F/O: Sink rate, sink rate. (overlapped by GPWS warning)

(GPWS warning: Two hundred [feet])

- CAP: Okay, okay.

(GPWS warning: One hundred [feet])

- F/O: One hundred [feet]. Speed?
- CAP: Yeah.
- F/O: Go around.

(GPWS warning: Fifty...forty...thirty)

- CAP: Get your hands.... Get off! Get off! Tell me what it is. get off.

(GPWS warning: Twenty [feet])

- F/O: Go around?
- CAP: No, no!

(GPWS warning: Ten...five)

(Contact with the runway)

- F/O: Okay reversers!
- CAP: Brake! What are you doing?! You're gonna kill us! Okay don't pull the yoke!

(Sound of impact)

- (CWP warning: Master Warning chime, plays until ending
- F/O: [I wanted to] go around...go around.
- CAP: Yeah but we were on.... we were on the runway. Why did you pull us off? Okay, okay. We got to get out of here. Open your window.

(Sound of opening the cockpit window)

- (CWP warning: Evacuation chime, plays until ending)
- CAP: Get your [evacuation] slide. Why did you pull us off? We had full reverse on. Pull the fire handles. Pull 'em.
- F/O: Fire pulls.
- CAP: Okay, get out. Get out.

(END OF RECORDING)

== See also ==
- Jeju Air Flight 2216
