= Korean Air Cargo Flight 8509 =

1999 aviation accident in England

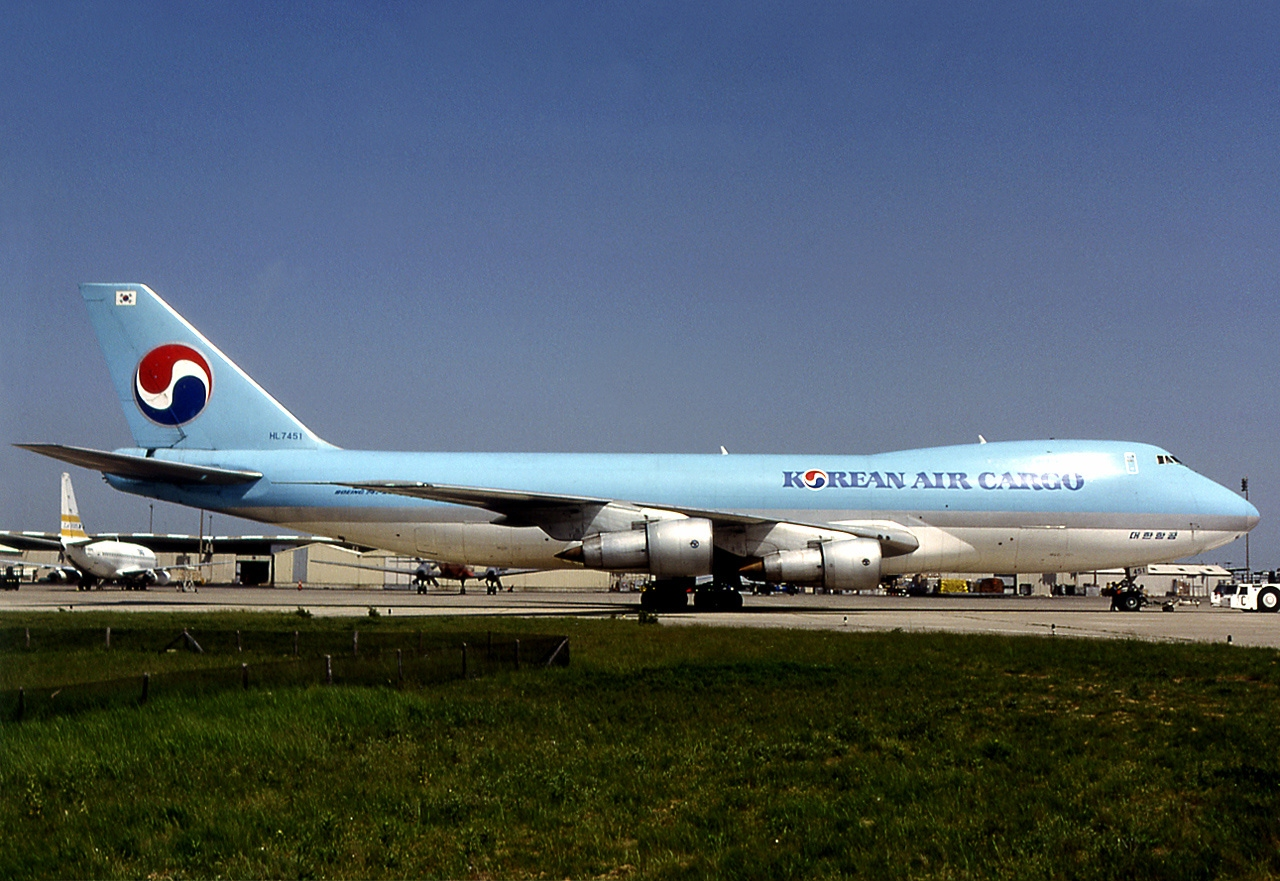
- HL7451, the aircraft involved in the accident, seen in 1992

Accident
- Date: 22 December 1999
- Summary: Crashed shortly after take off due to pilot error caused by instrument failure compounded by poor CRM
- Site: Great Hallingbury, England, United Kingdom; 51°51′23″N 0°12′59″E

Aircraft
- Aircraft type: Boeing 747-2B5F
- Operator: Korean Air Cargo
- IATA flight No.: KE8509
- ICAO flight No.: KAL8509
- Call sign: KOREAN AIR 8509
- Registration: HL7451
- Flight origin: Gimpo International Airport, Seoul, South Korea
- 1st stopover: Tashkent International Airport, Tashkent, Uzbekistan
- 2nd stopover: London Stansted Airport, England, United Kingdom
- Destination: Milan Malpensa Airport, Milan, Italy
- Occupants: 4
- Crew: 4
- Fatalities: 4
- Survivors: 0

Korean Air Cargo Flight 8509 was a Boeing 747-2B5F, registered HL7451 bound for Milan Malpensa Airport, that crashed due to instrument malfunction and pilot error on 22 December 1999 shortly after take-off from London Stansted Airport where the final leg of its route from South Korea to Italy had begun. The aircraft crashed into Hatfield Forest near the village of Great Hallingbury, close to, but clear of, some houses, killing all four crew members on board.

== Background ==
=== Aircraft ===
The aircraft involved was a Boeing 747-2B5F, MSN 22480, registered as HL7451, which was manufactured in 1980. In its 19 years of service, it had logged approximately 15,451 flights and 83,011 airframe hours before its fatal flight. It was equipped with four Pratt & Whitney JT9D-7Q engines.

=== Flight crew ===
The flight crew consisted of:

- 57-year-old Captain Park Duk-kyu (Korean: 박득규; Hanja: 朴得圭)
- 33-year-old First Officer Yoon Ki-sik (윤기식; 尹基植)
- 38-year-old Flight Engineer Park Hoon-kyu (박훈규; 朴薰圭)
- 45-year-old maintenance mechanic Kim Il-suk (김일석; 金日奭).

The captain was a former colonel and pilot in the Republic of Korea Air Force and a highly experienced airman, with a total of 13,490 flying hours – 8,495 of which were accumulated flying Boeing 747s. The first officer, in contrast, was relatively inexperienced with just 195 hours of flying experience on the 747 and a total of 1,406 flight hours. The flight engineer, like the captain, had a lot of experience flying 747s – 4,511 out of his 8,301 total flight hours were accrued in them. The maintenance mechanic had been involved with the failed INU repair.

=== INU failure and failed repair ===
Following the plane's departure from Tashkent on the previous flight segment, one of its inertial navigation units (INUs) had partially failed, providing erroneous roll data to the captain's attitude director indicator (ADI or artificial horizon). The first officer's ADI and a backup ADI were correct, a comparator alarm called attention to the discrepancy, and in daylight, the erroneous indication was easily identified. The ADI's input selector was switched to the other INU and the correct indications returned.

At Stansted, the engineers who attempted to repair the ADI did not have the correct Fault Isolation Manual available and did not repair or replace the faulty number 1 INU. One of them identified and repaired a damaged connecting plug on the ADI. When the ADI responded correctly to its "Test" button, they believed the fault had been corrected, although this button only tested the ADI and not the INU. The ADI's input selector was left in the normal position.

== Accident ==
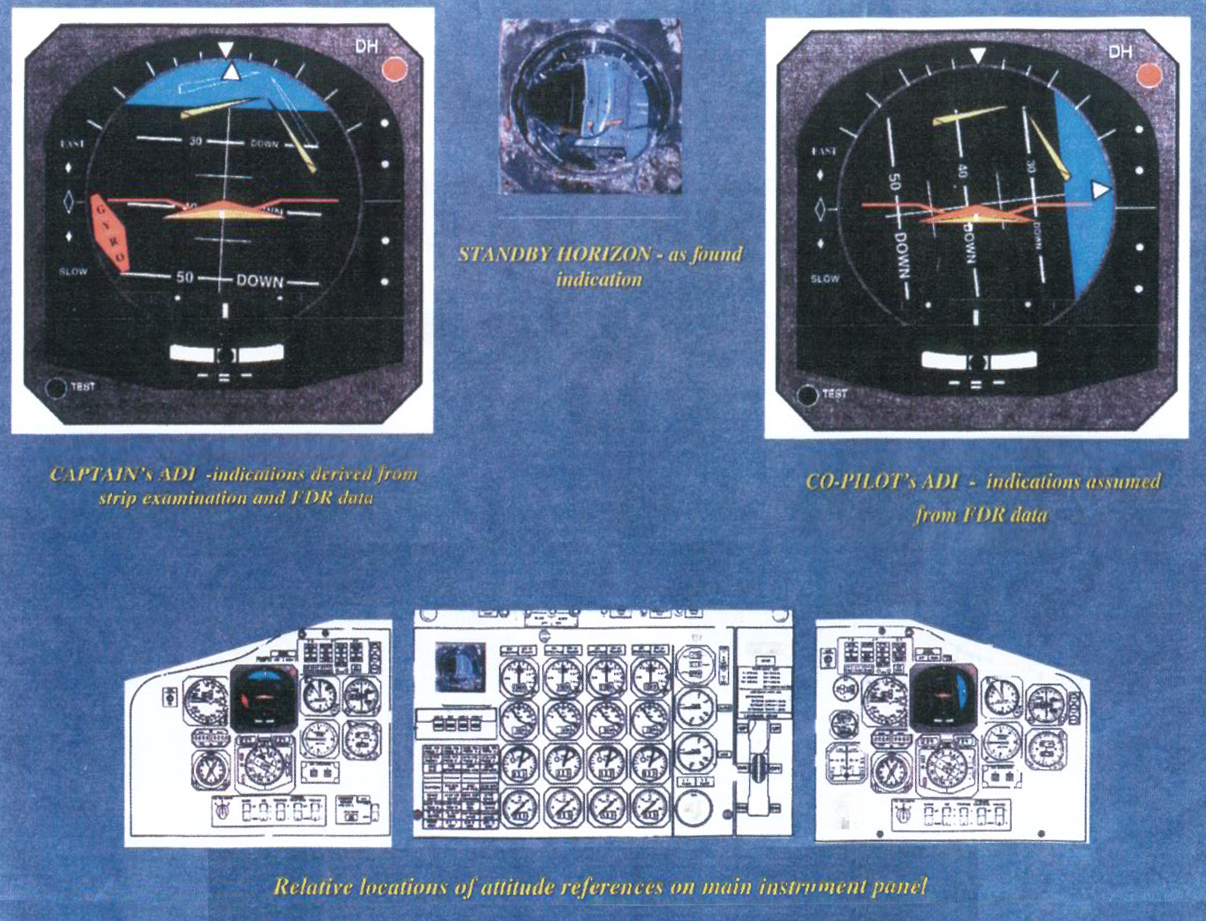
Attitude reference data at the moment of impact of HL-7451. Note the captain's (left side) ADI shows the aircraft near wings-level and nearly 40 degrees nose-down, while the first officer's (right) ADI shown the aircraft in a steep left bank of nearly 90 degrees and nearly 40 degrees nose down. These indications were reconstructed using the last information recovered from the flight data recorder. The centre instrument, the "standby horizon," was heavily damaged in the impact, and only the front part of it was recovered a year later. Its near 90 degree bank angle agrees with the first officer's ADI, and smudge marks suggest the vertical reference was forcibly moved against the instrument, which might account for its apparent pitch discrepancy with the other two instruments.

It was dark when the plane took off from London Stansted Airport, with the captain flying. The aircraft entered the clouds 400 feet above the terrain. When the captain banked the plane to the left, the faulty INU sent erroneous data to his ADI, preventing the instrument from showing the aircraft was in a bank. The comparator alarm sounded repeatedly, which was an indication that the aircraft's two ADI displays were in disagreement. The first officer, whose own ADI displayed the correct angle of bank, according to information from the aircraft's flight data recorder, failed to participate in full crew resource management techniques, saying nothing to challenge his captain's actions nor making any attempt to take over the flight with his own controls. The older and more experienced flight engineer did call out "Bank is not working" (translated into English from Korean in the AAIB report) 20.8 seconds before impact, "Bank Bank" (in English) 16.9 seconds before impact, "Standby indicator [in English] also not working [in Korean]" 10.2 seconds before impact, and "Oy!, bank." (in Korean) 1.5 seconds before impact. The captain continued to ignore the chiming alarm and made no verbal response to the flight engineer. Data from the flight recorder indicate that during this time the control wheel was commanding the aircraft into a steeper left bank. At 18:38, 55 seconds after take-off, Flight 8509's left-wing dragged along the ground, then the aircraft plunged into the ground at a speed of between 250 and 300 knots (460 and 560 km/h; 290 and 350 mph), in a 40° pitch down and 90° left bank attitude. The aircraft exploded on impact.

== Aftermath ==
After the investigation, the United Kingdom's Air Accidents Investigation Branch (AAIB) issued recommendations to Korean Air to revise its training program and company culture, to promote a more free atmosphere between the captain and the first officer. The first recommendation of the AAIB's final accident report was that:

Korean Air continue to update their training and Flight Quality Assurance programmes, to accommodate Crew Resource Management evolution and industry developments, to address issues specific to their operational environment and ensure adaptation of imported training material to accommodate the Korean culture.

— Air Accidents Investigation Branch, "Report on the accident to Boeing 747-2B5F, HL-7451 near London Stansted Airport on 22 December 1999" (PDF). June 2003. p. 85.

== In popular culture ==
Season 11 Episode 7 of the Canadian documentary series Mayday (titled Air Crash Investigation outside of Canada) released in March 2012 investigated the accident; the name of the episode was "Bad Attitude" or "Stansted Crash".

== See also ==
- Impact of culture on aviation safety
- Air India Flight 855 – Another Boeing 747 that crashed under identical circumstances in 1978.
- Copa Airlines Flight 201 – A Boeing 737 that crashed under identical circumstances in 1992.
- West Air Sweden Flight 294 – A Bombardier CRJ200 that crashed under identical circumstances in 2016.
