= List of deadliest aircraft accidents and incidents =

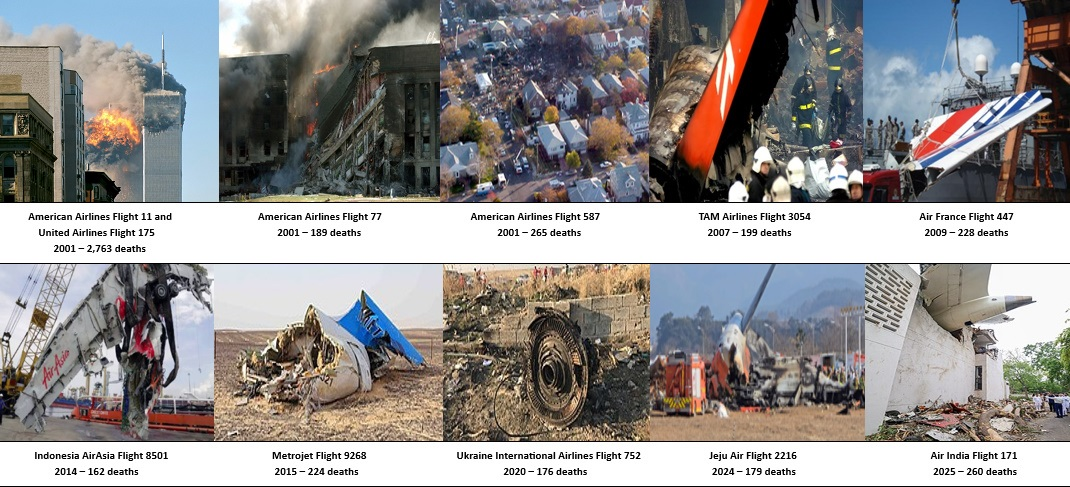
A collage of some of the deadliest aircraft disasters worldwide since 2001

This article lists the deadliest aircraft accidents and incidents involving commercial passenger and cargo flights, military passenger and cargo flights, or general aviation flights that have been involved in a ground or mid-air collision.

As of 22 November 2026, 208 accidents and incidents have resulted in at least 100 fatalities, 35 at least 200 fatalities, 8 at least 300 fatalities, and 4 at least 500 fatalities.

== History ==
On 17 September 1908, exactly four years and nine months after the pioneering flight of the Wright brothers on 17 December 1903, Thomas Selfridge became the first fatality of powered flight while flying as a passenger with Orville Wright during a demonstration of the Wright Model A at Fort Myer, Virginia. On 7 September 1909, Eugène Lefebvre was the first to be killed while piloting a powered airplane, while the first fatal mid-air collision occurred on 19 June 1912, near Douai, France, killing the pilot of each aircraft. Since the deaths of these early aviation pioneers, the scale of fatal aircraft accidents has increased in proportion to the size and capacity of airplanes.

The greatest number of passenger fatalities involving one airline in a single calendar year occurred in 2014 with Malaysia Airlines, with 537 people dead (presumably - with the wreckage unrecovered, the death toll is not entirely confirmed) in two tragedies: the disappearance of Flight 370 on 8 March and the shootdown of Flight 17 on 17 July. When including ground fatalities, American Airlines holds this distinction, with the 2001 crashes of Flight 11 and Flight 77 on 11 September, and Flight 587 on 12 November, having a combined total of approximately 2,000 deaths, including 416 people on the three aircraft. The deliberate crashes of the aforementioned American Airlines Flight 11, as well as United Airlines Flight 175 at the World Trade Center, and the subsequent collapse of both towers on 11 September 2001 caused 2,606 ground fatalities in addition to the deaths of the 157 people on board both flights, making it the deadliest aviation disaster in history.

The most fatalities in any aviation accident in history was the Tenerife airport disaster, which occurred at Tenerife North–Ciudad de La Laguna Airport (then Los Rodeos Airport) in Tenerife, Canary Islands, Spain, on 27 March 1977, when a KLM Boeing 747-206B and a Pan Am Boeing 747-121 collided on a runway, killing 583 people. The largest number of fatalities from the accidental crash of a single aircraft occurred on 12 August 1985, when Japan Air Lines Flight 123, a Boeing 747SR-46 en route from Tokyo to Osaka, crashed at Mount Takamagahara in Ueno, Gunma Prefecture, Japan, killing 520 people. The greatest number of fatalities from a mid-air collision occurred to the west of New Delhi, India, on 12 November 1996, when a Saudi Arabian Airlines Boeing 747-168B en route from Delhi to Dhahran, Saudi Arabia, collided with a Kazakhstan Airlines Ilyushin Il-76TD en route from Shymkent, Kazakhstan, to Delhi, killing all 349 people aboard both aircraft.

In 2012, Boeing released a study of worldwide commercial jet airplane accidents between 1959 and 2011. It reported 1,798 accidents, 603 of which were categorized as fatal, which accounted for 29,025 onboard fatalities and an additional 1,173 ground or noncommercial aircraft collision deaths. The Boeing analysis suggests a decrease of commercial aviation accident fatality rates toward the end of the study period.

== Definitions ==
The US Code of Federal Regulations defines an accident as "an occurrence associated with the operation of an aircraft, which takes place between the time any person boards the aircraft with the intention of flight and all such persons have disembarked, and in which any person suffers death or serious injury, or in which the aircraft receives substantial damage;" an incident as "an occurrence other than an accident, associated with the operation of an aircraft, which affects or could affect the safety of operations;" and a fatal injury as one which results in death within 30 days of the accident. The definitions of accident, incident, and fatality in the Code of Federal Regulations, and used by the FAA and NTSB, are generally consistent with those found in the ICAO Chicago Convention on International Civil Aviation Annex 13.

== Table key ==
Table key (deaths, type)
Column	Abbreviation	Definition
Deaths	Tot	Total
Deaths	C	Crew
Deaths	P	Passenger
Deaths	G	Ground
Deaths	N	Notes
Deaths	‡	Was previously the deadliest incident
Deaths	†	No survivors
Deaths	1*	Sole survivor
T abv. for Type	COM	Commercial (accident/incident)
T abv. for Type	MIL	Military (accident/incident)
T abv. for Type	INB	Bombing
T abv. for Type	INH	Hijacking
T abv. for Type	EXG	Attacked using ground-based weapons
T abv. for Type	EXS	Attacked by other aircraft

Table key (location, phase of flight)
Column	Abbreviation	Definition
Location	(none)	< 20 km (11 NM)
Location	"off"	< 20 km (11 NM) (water impact)
Location	"near"	20 km (11 NM) to 50 km (27 NM)
Location	"area of"	> 50 km (27 NM)
Phase	STD	Standing
Phase	TXI	Taxi
Phase	TOF	Take off
Phase	ICL	Initial climb
Phase	ENR	En route
Phase	MNV	Maneuvering
Phase	APR	Approach
Phase	LDG	Landing
Phase	UNK	Unknown
Airport	***	Active or decommissioned military bases; closed/reassigned civil airports

== Table ==
List of aircraft accidents and incidents resulting in 50 or more fatalities. Initial sort order is by total fatalities (descending) and then by date (most recent to most distant).
Deaths					T	Incident (Note: In cases where specific flight numbers do not exist or are not provided in supporting records, the aircraft's registration number appears in parentheses.)	Aircraft	Location	Cause	Phase	Route	Airport	Distance	Date
Tot	C	P	G	N	T	Incident	Aircraft	Location	Cause	Phase	Route	Airport	Distance	Date
est. 1,700 (Note: It is impossible to definitively know exactly how many people died from the hijacking and crash of American Airlines Flight 11, since this crash and the one of United Airlines Flight 175 happened in the same place, at about the same time, and it is hard to distinguish who died from which plane. It is known for certain, however, that the sum of plane and ground fatalities caused by both suicide attacks is 2,763. In addition to the rough estimate of 1,600 ground fatalities blamed on Flight 11, the number of people aboard the hijacked flight was 92. The death toll of Flight 11 thus comes out to approximately 1,700 when rounded.)	11	81	est. 1,600	†	INH	American Airlines Flight 11	Boeing 767-223ER	New York City, New York, U.S.	Hijacking	ENR	BOS-LAX			2001-09-11
est. 1,000 (Note: It is impossible to definitively know exactly how many people died from the hijacking and crash of United Airlines Flight 175, since this crash and the one of American Airlines Flight 11 happened in the same place, at about the same time, and it is hard to distinguish who died from which plane. It is known for certain, however, that the sum of plane and ground fatalities caused by both suicide attacks is 2,763. In addition to the rough estimate of 1,000 ground fatalities blamed on Flight 175, the number of people aboard the hijacked flight was 65. The death toll of Flight 175 thus comes out to approximately 1,060 when rounded.)	9	56	est. 900	†	INH	United Airlines Flight 175	Boeing 767-222	New York City, New York, U.S.	Hijacking	ENR	BOS-LAX			2001-09-11
583	23	560	0	‡	COM	Pan Am Flight 1736 and KLM Flight 4805	Boeing 747-121 and Boeing 747-206B	Tenerife, Canary Islands, Spain	Runway collision	TXI/TOF	LAX-JFK-LPA and AMS-LPA	TFN		1977-03-27
520	15	505	0		COM	Japan Air Lines Flight 123	Boeing 747SR-46	Mount Takamagahara, Ueno, Japan	Partial breakup due to improper maintenance	ENR	HND-ITM			1985-08-12
349	33	316	0	†	COM	Saudia Flight 763 and Kazakhstan Airlines Flight 1907	Boeing 747-168B and Ilyushin Il-76TD	Charkhi Dadri, India	Mid-air collision	ENR	DEL-DHA-JED and CIT-DEL			1996-11-12
346	11	335	0	‡, †	COM	Turkish Airlines Flight 981	McDonnell Douglas DC-10-10	Fontaine-Chaalis, France	Mid-flight cargo door failure, depressurization and loss of control	ENR	ISL-ORY-LHR			1974-03-03
329	22	307	0	†	INB	Air India Flight 182	Boeing 747-237B	Atlantic Ocean, area of Cork, Ireland	Bombing	ENR	YYZ-YMX-LHR-DEL-BOM			1985-06-23
301	14	287	0	†	COM	Saudia Flight 163	Lockheed L-1011-200 TriStar	Riyadh, Saudi Arabia	In-flight fire, no evacuation	ENR	KHI-RUH-XZF	RUH		1980-08-19
298	15	283	0	†	EXG	Malaysia Airlines Flight 17	Boeing 777-2H6ER	near Hrabove, Donetsk Oblast, Ukraine	Missile strike	ENR	AMS-KUL			2014-07-17
290	16	274	0	†	EXG	Iran Air Flight 655	Airbus A300B2-203	Strait of Hormuz, off Shib Deraz, Iran	Missile strike	ENR	THR-BND-DXB			1988-07-03
275	18	257	0	†	MIL	Iranian Revolutionary Guard Corps Aerospace Force (15-2280)	Ilyushin Il-76MD	near Kerman, Iran	Collision with terrain	ENR	ZAH-KER			2003-02-19
273	13	258	2	†	COM	American Airlines Flight 191	McDonnell Douglas DC-10-10	Des Plaines, Illinois, U.S.	Loss of engine; partial loss of hydraulics	TOF	ORD-LAX	ORD	1.4 km (0.76 NM)	1979-05-25
270	16	243	11	†	INB	Pan Am Flight 103	Boeing 747-121	Lockerbie, United Kingdom	Bombing	ENR	FRA-LHR-JFK-DTW			1988-12-21
269	23	246	0	†	EXS	Korean Air Lines Flight 007	Boeing 747-230B	Sea of Japan, near Moneron Island, Russian SFSR, USSR	Navigation error, missile strike	ENR	JFK-ANC-GMP			1983-09-01
265	9	251	5	†	COM	American Airlines Flight 587	Airbus A300B4-605R	Belle Harbor, New York City, New York, U.S.	Vertical stabilizer breakup due to pilot error	ENR	JFK-SDQ			2001-11-12
264	15	249	0		COM	China Airlines Flight 140	Airbus A300B4-622R	Komaki, Japan	Pilot error, design flaw	LDG	TPE-NKM	NKM	<0.1 km (0.054 NM)	1994-04-26
261	14	247	0	†	COM	Nigeria Airways Flight 2120	McDonnell Douglas DC-8-61	Jeddah, Saudi Arabia	In-flight fire	TOF	JED-SKO	JED	2.8 km (1.5 NM)	1991-07-11
260	12	229	19	1*	COM	Air India Flight 171	Boeing 787-8 Dreamliner	Ahmedabad, India	Unknown; suspected intentional crash	ICL	AMD-LGW	AMD	1.6 km (0.86 NM)	2025-06-12
257	10	247	0	†	MIL	Algerian Air Force (7T-WIV)	Ilyushin Il-76TD	Boufarik, Algeria		ICL	DAAK-CBH-TIN			2018-04-11
257	20	237	0	†	COM	Air New Zealand Flight 901	McDonnell Douglas DC-10-30	Mount Erebus, Antarctica	Collision with terrain	ENR	AKL-Antarctic Nonstop-CHC-AKL			1979-11-28
256	8	248	0	†	COM	Arrow Air Flight 1285R	McDonnell Douglas DC-8-63CF	Gander, Newfoundland, Canada	Suspected ice contamination on the wings	ICL	CAI-CGN-YQX-HOP	YQX	1 km (0.54 NM)	1985-12-12
251	2	0	249 (Note: The exact number of people that were killed on the ground is not known. The number of manslaughter charges was 225, ASN says 237, the CAA review 1990-1999 states 297, and some media sources have stated numbers over 300. Vincent Nicod of the International Committee of the Red Cross stated that 249 bodies on the ground were found. It is known that four crew members survived.)		COM	Air Africa (RA-26222)	Antonov An-32B	Kinshasa, Zaire (now the Democratic Republic of the Congo)	Runway overrun	ICL	NLO-FZCF	NLO	0.6 km (0.32 NM)	1996-01-08
239	12	227	0	† (Note: The aircraft is missing, thus the fatality number is presumed.)	COM	Malaysia Airlines Flight 370	Boeing 777-2H6ER	Indian Ocean	Unknown; suspected human interference	ENR	KUL-PEK			2014-03-08
234	14	220	0	†	COM	Garuda Indonesia Flight 152	Airbus A300B4-220	near Medan, Indonesia	Collision with terrain	APR	CGK-MES	MES	32 km (17 NM)	1997-09-26
230	18	212	0	†	COM	Trans World Airlines Flight 800	Boeing 747-131	Atlantic Ocean, off East Moriches, New York, U.S.	Fuel tank explosion	ENR	JFK-CDG-FCO			1996-07-17
229	14	215	0	†	COM	Swissair Flight 111	McDonnell Douglas MD-11	Atlantic Ocean, off Peggys Cove, N.S., Canada	In-flight fire	ENR	JFK-GVA			1998-09-02
229	14	215	0		COM	Korean Air Flight 801	Boeing 747-3B5	Asan-Maina, Guam, U.S.	Poor crew communication	APR	GMP-GUM	GUM	4.8 km (2.6 NM)	1997-08-06
228	12	216	0	†	COM	Air France Flight 447	Airbus A330-203	Atlantic Ocean, area of Saint Peter and Saint Paul Archipelago	Pitot tube blockage, pilot error	ENR	GIG-CDG			2009-06-01
225	19	206	0	†	COM	China Airlines Flight 611	Boeing 747-209B	Taiwan Strait, near Penghu Islands, Taiwan	Breakup due to improper repair	ENR	TPE-HKG			2002-05-25
224	7	217	0	†	INB	Metrojet Flight 9268	Airbus A321-231	near Hasna, North Sinai Governorate, Egypt	Suspected bombing	ENR	SSH-LED			2015-10-31
223	10	213	0	†	COM	Lauda Air Flight 004	Boeing 767-3Z9ER	Phu Toei National Park, Thailand	Mechanical failure	ENR	HGK-DMK-VIE			1991-05-26
217	15	202	0	†	COM	EgyptAir Flight 990	Boeing 767-366ER	Atlantic Ocean, area of Nantucket, Massachusetts, U.S.	Suspected intentional crash	ENR	LAX-JFK-CAI			1999-10-31
213	23	190	0	†	COM	Air India Flight 855	Boeing 747-237B	Arabian Sea, off Mumbai, India	Instrument malfunction, pilot error	ENR	BOM-DXB			1978-01-01
203	14	182	7	†	COM	China Airlines Flight 676	Airbus A300B4-622R	Dayuan District, Taiwan	Pilot error	APR	DPS-TPE	TPE	0.06 km (0.032 NM)	1998-02-16
200	9	191	0	†	COM	Aeroflot Flight 5143	Tupolev Tu-154B-2	near Uchkuduk, Uzbek SSR, USSR	Pilot error	ENR	KSQ-UFA-LED			1985-07-10
199	6	181	12	†	COM	TAM Linhas Aéreas Flight 3054	Airbus A320-233	São Paulo, Brazil	Runway overrun	LDG	POA-CGH	CGH		2007-07-17
191	9	182	0	†	COM	Martinair Flight 138	Douglas DC-8-55CF	near Maskeliya, Sri Lanka	Collision with terrain	ENR	SUB-CMB-XZF			1974-12-04
189	8	181	0	†	COM	Lion Air Flight 610	Boeing 737 MAX 8	Java Sea, off Tanjungbungin, Karawang Regency, Indonesia	Sensor/MCAS failure	ENR	CGK-PGK			2018-10-29
189	6	58	125	†	INH	American Airlines Flight 77	Boeing 757-223	Arlington, Virginia, U.S.	Hijacking	ENR	IAD-LAX			2001-09-11
189	13	176	0	†	COM	Birgenair Flight 301	Boeing 757-225	Atlantic Ocean, near Puerto Plata, Dominican Republic	Pitot tube blockage, pilot error	ENR	POP-YQX-SXF-FRA			1996-02-06
188	7	181	0	†	COM	Royal Air Maroc (JY-AEE)	Boeing 707-321C	Tamri, Morocco	Collision with terrain	ENR	LBG-GMAA			1975-08-03
183	11	172	0	†	COM	LOT Polish Airlines Flight 5055	Ilyushin Il-62M	Warsaw, Poland	Disintegration of engine shaft	ENR (Note: Emergency began ENR, lost control on APR.)	WAW-JFK-SFO	WAW	6 km (3.2 NM)	1987-05-09
183	8	175	0		COM	Loftleiðir Flight 001	Douglas DC-8-63CF	Katunayake, Sri Lanka	Pilot error	APR	XZF-CMB-SUB	CMB	2.1 km (1.1 NM)	1978-11-15
181	19	162	0		COM	Avianca Flight 011	Boeing 747-283B	Madrid, Spain	Pilot error, ATC error	APR	FRA-CDG-MAD-CCS-BOG	MAD	12 km (6.5 NM)	1983-11-27
180	7	173	0	†	COM	Inex-Adria Aviopromet Flight 1308	McDonnell Douglas MD-82	Mount San Pietro, Petreto-Bicchisano, Corsica, France	Pilot error	ENR	LJU-AJA	AJA		1981-12-01
179	4	175	0		COM	Jeju Air Flight 2216	Boeing 737-800	Muan, South Jeolla, South Korea	Bird strike	LDG	BKK-MWX	MWX		2024-12-29
178	9	169	0		COM	Surinam Airways Flight 764	Douglas DC-8-62	Zanderij, Suriname	Pilot error	APR	AMS-PBM	PBM	3 km (1.6 NM)	1989-06-07
178	5	169	4		COM	Aeroflot Flight 3352	Tupolev Tu-154	Omsk, Russian SFSR, USSR	ATC error	LDG	KRR-OMS-OVB	OMS		1984-10-11
178	13	165	0	†	COM	Aeroflot Flight 7628 and Aeroflot Flight 7880	Tupolev Tu-134A (both)	near Dniprodzerzhynsk, Ukrainian SSR, USSR	Mid-air collision	ENR	VOZ-RMO and DOK-MHP			1979-08-11
176	9	167	0	†	EXG	Ukraine International Airlines Flight 752	Boeing 737-800	Tehran, Iran	Missile strike	ENR	IKA-KBP	IKA		2020-01-08
176	14	162	0	†	COM	British Airways Flight 476 and Inex-Adria Aviopromet Flight 550	Hawker Siddeley Trident 3B and Douglas DC-9-32	Vrbovec, SR Croatia, Yugoslavia	Mid-air collision	ENR	LHR-ISL and SPU-CGN			1976-09-10
176	6	170	0	‡	COM	Nigeria Airways (JY-ADO)	Boeing 707-3D3C	Kano, Nigeria	Landing gear failure	LDG	XZF-LOS	KAN		1973-01-22
174	10	164	0	‡, †	COM	Aeroflot Flight 217	Ilyushin Il-62	Moscow, Russian SFSR, USSR	Unknown; suspected crew incapacitation	APR	ORY-LED-SVO	SVO	11 km (5.9 NM)	1972-10-13
170	10	160	0	†	COM	Pulkovo Aviation Enterprise Flight 612	Tupolev Tu-154M	Sukha Balka, Donetsk Oblast, Ukraine	Poor crew training	ENR	AAQ-LED			2006-08-22
170	14	156	0	†	INB	Union de Transports Aériens Flight 772	McDonnell Douglas DC-10-30	Ténéré, Niger	Bombing	ENR	BZV-NDJ-CDG			1989-09-19
169	10	159	0		COM	Kenya Airways Flight 431	Airbus A310-304	Gulf of Guinea off Abidjan, Ivory Coast	Pilot error	ENR	ABJ-LOS-NBO			2000-01-30
168	12	156	0	†	COM	Caspian Airlines Flight 7908	Tupolev Tu-154M	Qazvin, Iran	Fatigue failure	ENR	IKA-EVN			2009-07-15
167	12	155	0	†	COM	Pakistan International Airlines Flight 268	Airbus A300B4-200	Kathmandu, Nepal	Pilot error	APR	KHI-KTM	KTM	20 km (11 NM)	1992-09-28
167	8	159	0	†	COM	Mexicana de Aviación Flight 940	Boeing 727-264	Sierra Madre Occidental, near Maravatío, Mexico	Brake system failure	ENR	MEX-PVR-MZT-LAX			1986-03-31
166	10	156	0	†	COM	Aeroflot Flight 4225	Tupolev Tu-154B-2	Almaty, Kazakh SSR, USSR	Wind shear	ENR	ALA-SIP			1980-07-08
162	7	155	0	†	COM	Indonesia AirAsia Flight 8501	Airbus A320-216	Karimata Strait, between Belitung and Borneo, Java Sea, Indonesia	Pilot error	ENR	SUB-SIN			2014-12-28
162	7	155	0	‡, 1* (Note: Pilot of fighter plane ejected to safety)	COM	All Nippon Airways Flight 58 and JASDF (92-7932)	Boeing 727-200 and North American F-86 Sabre	Shizukuishi, Japan	Mid-air collision	ENR	CTS-HND			1971-07-30
160	8	152	0	†	COM	West Caribbean Airways Flight 708	McDonnell Douglas MD-82	near Machiques, Venezuela	Pilot error	ENR	PTY-FDF			2005-08-16
160	14	146	0	†	COM	China Northwest Airlines Flight 2303	Tupolev Tu-154M	Xi'an, China	Improper maintenance	ENR	XIY-CAN			1994-06-06
159	6	147	6	†	COM	Dana Air Flight 0992	McDonnell Douglas MD-83	Lagos, Nigeria	Improper maintenance, pilot error	APR	ABV-LOS	LOS	9.3 km (5.0 NM)	2012-06-03
159	8	151	0		COM	American Airlines Flight 965	Boeing 757-223	near Buga, Colombia	Pilot error	APR	MIA-CLO	CLO	c. 48 km (26 NM)	1995-12-20
159	9	150	0		COM	Libyan Arab Airlines Flight 1103 and Libyan Air Force	Boeing 727-2L5 and Mikoyan-Gurevich MiG-23	Qasr bin Ghashir, Tripoli, Libya	Mid-air collision	APR	BEN-TIP	TIP	9 km (4.9 NM)	1992-12-22
159	8	151 (Note: Some reports claim there were 163 on board, others 174 or even 200 including some unidentified civilians, and possible military personnel who hitched a ride. In any case, a total of 159 were confirmed to have died.)	0	†	MIL	Nigerian Air Force (NAF911)	Lockheed C-130H Hercules	Lagos, Nigeria	Engine failure	ENR	LOS-KAD			1992-09-26
159	19	140	0	†	COM	South African Airways Flight 295	Boeing 747-244B	Indian Ocean, area of Mauritius	In-fight fire	ENR	TPE-MRU-JNB			1987-11-28
158	6	160	0		COM	Air India Express Flight 812	Boeing 737-8HG	Mangalore, India	Pilot error	LDG	DXB-IXE	IXE		2010-05-22
157	8	149	0	†	COM	Ethiopian Airlines Flight 302	Boeing 737 MAX 8	Bishoftu, Ethiopia	Sensor/MCAS failure	ENR	ADD-NBO			2019-03-10
156	6	148	2	1*	COM	Northwest Airlines Flight 255	McDonnell Douglas MD-82	Romulus, Michigan, U.S.	Pilot error	TOF	MBS-DTW-PHX-SNA	DTW	<0.5 km (0.27 NM)	1987-08-16
156	11	145	0	†	COM	Pakistan International Airlines Flight 740	Boeing 707-340C	near Taif, Saudi Arabia	In-flight fire	ENR	KAN-XZF-KHI			1979-11-26
156	11	145	0	†	COM	Interflug Flight 450	Ilyushin Il-62	Königs Wusterhausen, East Germany	In-flight fire	ENR	SXF-BOJ			1972-08-14
155	7	148	0	†	COM	Spantax (EC-BZR)	Convair 990 Coronado	San Cristóbal, Tenerife, Canary Islands, Spain	Pilot disorientation, ATC error	ICL	TFN-MUC	TFN	0.33 km (0.18 NM)	1972-12-03
155	10	74	71	‡, †	COM	Viasa Flight 742	McDonnell Douglas DC-9-32	Maracaibo, Venezuela	Faulty temperature sensors, overloaded aircraft	ICL	CCS-MAR-MIA	MAR	0.85 km (0.46 NM)	1969-03-16
155	5	150	0	‡, †	EXG	US Air Force (60-0297)	Lockheed C-130B Hercules	Kham Duc, South Vietnam	Shot down	ICL				1968-05-12
154	6	148	0		COM	Spanair Flight 5022	McDonnell Douglas MD-82	Madrid, Spain	Pilot error	TOF	BCN-MAD-LPA	MAD	<0.5 km (0.27 NM)	2008-08-20
154	6	148	0	† (Note: Private jet landed safely, not included)	COM	Gol Transportes Aéreos Flight 1907 and ExcelAire (N600XL)	Boeing 737-8EH and Embraer Legacy 600	near Peixoto Azevedo, Mato Grosso, Brazil	Mid-air collision due to pilot error and ATC error	ENR	MAO-BSB-GIG and SJK-MAO-FLL-ISP			2006-09-29
154	8	146	0	†	COM	Turkish Airlines Flight 452	Boeing 727-2F2	Isparta, Turkey	Pilot error	APR	ISL-AYT	*** (Note: The pilot was on approach to the old Isparta Airport (closed, no codes available) believing he was on approach to Antalya.)		1976-09-19
153	7	138	8	†	COM	Pan Am Flight 759	Boeing 727-235	Kenner, Louisiana, U.S.	Microburst	ICL	MIA-MSY-LAS-SAN	MSY	<1 km (0.54 NM)	1982-07-09
152	6	146	0	†	COM	Airblue Flight 202	Airbus A321-231	Islamabad, Pakistan	Pilot error	APR	KHI-ISB	ISB	15 km (8.1 NM)	2010-07-28
152	11	141	0	1*	COM	Yemenia Flight 626	Airbus A310-324	Mozambique Channel off Mitsamiouli, Comoros	Pilot error	APR	SAH-HAH	HAH	c. 40 km (22 NM)	2009-06-30
150	6	144	0	†	COM	Germanwings Flight 9525	Airbus A320-211	Prads-Haute-Bléone, France	Intentional crash	ENR	BCN-DUS			2015-03-24
150	11	115	24	†	COM	Cubana de Aviación Flight 9046	Ilyushin II-62M	Havana, Cuba	Poor weather, pilot error	ICL	HAV-CGN-MXP	HAV	<1.5 km (0.81 NM)	1989-09-03
149	5	95	49		COM	Mandala Airlines Flight 091	Boeing 737-230	Medan, Indonesia	Pilot error	ICL	MES-CGK	MES	c. 1 km (0.54 NM)	2005-09-05
148	13	135	0	†	COM	Flash Airlines Flight 604	Boeing 737-3Q8	Red Sea, off Sharm el-Sheikh, Egypt	Unknown; suspected pilot disorientation	ENR	SSH-CAI-CDG			2004-01-03
148	7	141	0	†	COM	Iberia Flight 610	Boeing 727-256	Oiz mountain, Spain	Pilot error	ENR	MAD-BIO			1985-02-19
146	8	138	0	†	COM	Dan-Air Flight 1008	Boeing 727-46	La Esperanza Forest, Tenerife, Canary Islands, Spain	Pilot error	APR	MAN-TFN	TFN	12 km (6.5 NM)	1980-04-25
145	9	136	0	†	COM	Vladivostok Air Flight 352	Tupolev Tu-154M	near Budaro, Irkutsk, Russia	Pilot error	APR	SVX-IKT-VVO	IKT	23 km (12 NM)	2001-07-04
144	10	134	0	†	COM	ADC Airlines Flight 086	Boeing 727-231	Ejirin, Lagos State, Nigeria	ATC error	APR	PHC-LOS	LOS	56 km (30 NM)	1996-11-07
144	7	137	0	†	COM	Independent Air Flight 1851	Boeing 707-331B	Pico Alto, Azores, Portugal	Pilot error	APR	BGY-SMA-PUJ	SMA	6.6 km (3.6 NM)	1989-02-08
144	9	128	7	†	COM	Pacific Southwest Airlines Flight 182 and Private aircraft (N7711G)	Boeing 727-214 and Cessna 172	San Diego, California, U.S.	Mid-air collision	APR	SMF-LAX-SAN	SAN	5.6 km (3.0 NM)	1978-09-25
143	8	135	0	†	COM	Gulf Air Flight 072	Airbus A320-212	Persian Gulf, off Al Muharraq, Bahrain		APR	CAI-BAH	BAH	2 km (1.1 NM)	2000-08-23
143	7	136	0	†	COM	Avianca Flight 410	Boeing 727-21	Sardinata, Colombia		ENR	CUC-CTG			1988-03-17
141	5	136 (Note: The number of passengers killed varies from 135-143. 141 bodies in total were found, 5 crew, 133 passengers, and 3 others who were most likely also passengers.)	0		COM	UTA Flight 141	Boeing 727-223	Cotonou, Benin		TOF	CKY-COO-AKF-BEY-DXB	COO	<1 km (0.54 NM)	2003-12-25
141	11	130	0	†	COM	Vnukovo Airlines Flight 2801	Tupolev Tu-154M	Svalbard, Norway		APR	VKO-LYR	LYR	14.3 km (7.7 NM)	1996-08-29
141	4	137	0		COM	Trans Service Airlift (9Q-CRR)	Lockheed L-188 Electra	Jamba, Cuando Cubango, Angola		TOF				1995-12-18
141	10	131	0	†	COM	China Southern Airlines Flight 3943	Boeing 737-31B	Hejiaqiao, Yanshan District, China		APR	CAN-KWL	KWL	20 km (11 NM)	1992-11-24
140 (Note: The number of fatalities is unofficial.)	(Note: It is not known how many passengers or crew were killed in the incident. However, it was reported that there were 140 people on the aircraft, including seven crew members.)	(Note: It is not known how many passengers or crew were killed in the incident. However, it was reported that there were 140 people on the aircraft, including seven crew members.)	0	(Note: It is not known if there were any survivors.)	MIL	Malian Air Force (TZ-98T)	Ilyushin Il-76TD	Gao International Airport, Gao, Mali		LDG		GAQ		2023-09-23
139	12	110 (Note: The Indonesian Air Force reported that there were 122 persons on board the Hercules. On 4 July a local commissioner reported that there 121 people on the flight manifest: 38 military personnel on board the plane and 83 civilians.)	17 (Note: The number of ground fatalities is unclear, 139 bodies were found in total.)	†	MIL	Indonesian Air Force (A-1310)	Lockheed C-130 Hercules	Medan, Indonesia		ICL		MES	1 km (0.54 NM)	2015-06-30
138	11	127	0	(Note: Some sources state 155 were killed, but official accounts state 138 were killed.)	MIL	US Air Force (68-0218)	Lockheed C-5A Galaxy	Saigon, South Vietnam		ENR				1975-04-04
137	8	128	1		COM	Delta Air Lines Flight 191	Lockheed L-1011 TriStar	Irving, Texas, U.S.		APR	FLL-DFW-LAX	DFW	c. 2 km (1.1 NM)	1985-08-02
137	9	128	0	†	COM	Viação Aérea São Paulo Flight 168	Boeing 727-212A	Pacatuba, Brazil		APR	CGH-GIG-FOR	FOR	25 km (13 NM)	1982-06-08
135	12	121	2	1*	MIL	Indonesian Air Force (A-1324)	Lockheed C-130H-30 Hercules	East Jakarta, Indonesia		ICL	HLP-BDO	HLP	3 km (1.6 NM)	1991-10-05
134	12	116	6	‡, †	COM	United Air Lines Flight 826 and Trans World Airlines Flight 266	Douglas DC-8-21 and Lockheed L-1049	New York City, U.S.		APR	ORD-JFK and DAY-CMH-LGA	LGA		1960-12-16
133	14	119	0	†	MIL	Iran Air Tours Flight 962 and Iranian Air Force Su-24	Tupolev Tu-154 and Sukhoi Su-24	Shahr-e Qods, Iran		APR/TOF	THR-MHD	THR	15 km (8.1 NM)	1993-02-08
133	6	127	0		COM	Indian Airlines Flight 113	Boeing 737-2A8	Ahmedabad, India		APR	BOM-AMD	AMD	5 km (2.7 NM)	1988-10-19
133	7	126	0	†	COM	All Nippon Airways Flight 60	Boeing 727-81	Tokyo Bay, Japan		APR	CTS-HND	HND	12 km (6.5 NM)	1966-02-04
132	9	123	0	†	COM	China Eastern Airlines Flight 5735	Boeing 737-89P	Shentangbiao, Molang village, Teng County, Wuzhou, Guangxi, China	Unknown; suspected intentional crash	ENR	KMG-CAN			2022-03-21
132	5	127	0	†	COM	USAir Flight 427	Boeing 737-3B7	Aliquippa, Pennsylvania, U.S.		APR	ORD-PIT-PBI	PIT	13 km (7.0 NM)	1994-09-08
132	7	125	0	†	COM	SAM Colombia Flight 501	Boeing 727-146	La Canada, near Medellín, Colombia		ENR	PTY-MDE-BOG			1993-05-19
132	8	124	0	†	COM	Aeroflot Flight 8641	Yakovlev Yak-42	Mazyr, Byelorussian SSR, USSR		ENR	LED-IEV			1982-06-28
131	7	124	0	†	COM	Air Philippines Flight 541	Boeing 737-2H4	Samal, Davao del Norte, Philippines		APR	MNL-DVO	DVO	7.5 km (4.0 NM)	2000-04-19
131	4	127	0		COM	TAN-SAHSA Flight 414	Boeing 727-224	Tegucigalpa, Honduras		APR	SJO-MGA-TGU	TGU	9 km (4.9 NM)	1989-10-21
131	6	125	0		COM	Transportes Aéreos Portugueses Flight 425	Boeing 727-282Adv	Santa Cruz, Madeira, Portugal		LDG	BRU-LIS-FNC	FNC		1977-11-19
130	4	126	0	†	COM (Note: UNITA claimed responsibility for the crash. Angolan authorities cited the technical failure of the aircraft.)	TAAG Flight 462	Boeing 737-200	Lubango, Angola		ICL	SDD-LAD	SDD	1 km (0.54 NM)	1983-11-08
130	8	122	0		COM	Air France Flight 007	Boeing 707-328	Paris, France		TOF	ORY-JFK-ATL-HOU	ORY		1962-06-03
129	8	121	0		COM	Air China Flight 129	Boeing 767-2J6ER	Busan, South Korea		APR	PEK-PUS	PUS	4.6 km (2.5 NM)	2002-04-15
129	7	122	0	‡, †	MIL	US Air Force (51-0137)	Douglas C-124A-DL Globemaster II	Tachikawa, Japan		APR	RJTC-GMP	RJTC	5.6 km (3.0 NM)	1953-06-18
128	7	121	0		INH	Xiamen Airlines Flight 8301, China Southwest Airlines Flight 4305, and CAAC Flight 3523	Boeing 737-247, Boeing 707-3J6B, and Boeing 757-21B	Baiyun District, Guangzhou, China		LDG/STD/STD (Note: Xiamen Air was hijacked, China Southwest was parked and empty, and CAAC was parked waiting for clearance to takeoff.)	XMN-CAN and CTU-CAN and CAN-SHA	CAN		1990-10-02
128	8	120	0	†	COM	Iran Air Flight 291	Boeing 727-86	Alborz Mountains, Iran		APR	MHD-THR	THR	29 km (16 NM)	1980-01-21
128	11	117	0	†	COM	United Air Lines Flight 718 and Trans World Airlines Flight 2	Douglas DC-7 and Lockheed L-1049	Grand Canyon, Arizona, U.S.		ENR	LAX-MDW and LAX--MKC			1956-06-30
127	6	121	0	†	COM	Bhoja Air Flight 213	Boeing 737-236	Islamabad, Pakistan	Pilot Error	APR	KHI-ISB	ISB	c. 2.5 km (1.3 NM)	2012-04-20
127	0	127	0		MIL	Russian Air Force (89 Red)	Mil Mi-26	Khankala, Chechnya, Russia		APR				2002-08-19
126	11	115	0		COM	Československé Státní Aerolinie Flight 540	Ilyushin Il-62	Damascus, Syria		APR	PRG-DAM-BGW-THR	DAM	17 km (9.2 NM)	1975-08-20
126	9	117	0		COM	Globe Air (HB-ITB)	Bristol Britannia 313	Nicosia, Cyprus		APR	DMK-CMB-BOM-CAI-BSL	NIC	3.5 km (1.9 NM)	1967-04-20
125	5	120	0		COM	S7 Airlines Flight 778	Airbus A310-300	Irkutsk, Russia		LDG	DME-IKT	IKT		2006-07-09
125	6	119	0		INH	Ethiopian Airlines Flight 961	Boeing 767-260ER	Indian Ocean, off Grande Comore, Comoros		APR	ADD-NBO-BZV-LOS-ABJ	HAH (Note: The pilot attempted a controlled ditching near the beach while fighting with the hijackers.)	0.5 km (0.3 ml)	1996-11-23
125	9	115	1	†	COM	Baikal Airlines Flight 130	Tupolev Tu-154	Irkutsk, Russia		ENR	IKT-DME			1994-01-03
125	2	0	123	‡, †	MIL	Royal Air Force	De Havilland DH.98 Mosquito FB Mk VI	Copenhagen, Denmark		ENR				1945-03-21
124	11	113	0	†	COM	British Overseas Airways Corporation Flight 911	Boeing 707-436	Gotemba, Japan		ENR	LHR-JFK-SFO-HNL-HND-HGK			1966-03-05
123	6	117	0	†	COM	Faucett Perú Flight 251	Boeing 737-222	Arequipa, Peru		APR	LIM-AQP-TCQ	AQP	6.3 km (3.4 NM)	1996-02-29
123	7	116	0		COM	Varig Flight 820	Boeing 707-320C	Saulx-les-Chartreux, France		APR	GIG-ORY-LHR	ORY	5 km (2.7 NM)	1973-07-11
123	12	111	0		COM	South African Airways Flight 228	Boeing 707-344C	Windhoek, Namibia (then South West Africa)		ICL	JNB-WDH-LAD-LPA-FRA-LHR	WDH	5 km (2.7 NM)	1968-04-20
122	14	108	0	†	MIL	Myanmar Air Force (5820)	Shaanxi Y-8F-200	Andaman Sea, off Dawei, Myanmar		ENR	MGZ-RGN			2017-06-07
122	8	114	0	†	COM	Aeroflot Flight 964	Tupolev Tu-104B	Domodedovo, Russian SFSR, USSR		APR	KUT-DME	DME	17 km (9.2 NM)	1973-10-13
122	7	115	0	†	COM	Aeroflot Flight 1491	Antonov An-10	near Kharkiv, Ukrainian SSR, USSR		APR	VKO-HRK	HRK	24 km (13 NM)	1972-05-18
121	6	115	0	†	COM	Helios Airways Flight 522	Boeing 737-31S	Grammatiko, Greece		ENR	LCA-ATH-PRG			2005-08-14
121	13	108	0		COM	Pakistan International Airlines Flight 705	Boeing 720 040B	New Cairo, Egypt		APR	KHI-DHA-CAI-GVA-LHR	CAI	c. 20 km (11 NM)	1965-05-20
120	10	110	0	†	COM	Aeroflot Flight 831 and Soviet Air Force An-12	Ilyushin Il-14M and Antonov An-12BP	Poroslitsy, Yukhnovsky, Russian SFSR, USSR		ENR	BKA-CEJ-SIP and EYKD-EYKS-***			1969-06-23
119	12	107	0	†	COM	Iran Air Tours Flight 956	Tupolev Tu-154M	near Sarab-e Dowreh, Iran		APR	THR-KHD	KHD	c. 46 km (25 NM)	2002-02-12
119	8	111	0	†	COM	TAME Flight 173	Boeing 737-200 Advanced	Cuenca, Ecuador		APR	UIO-CUE	CUE	1.5 km (0.81 NM)	1983-07-11
118	8	106	4	†	COM	Scandinavian Airlines System Flight 686 and Private aircraft (D-IEVX)	McDonnell Douglas MD-87 and Cessna Citation CJ2	Milan, Italy		TOF/TXI	LIN-CPH and LIN-LBG	LIN		2001-10-08
118	11	100	7	†	COM	Aeroflot Flight 909	Ilyushin Il-18E	Verkhnyaya Khava, Verkhnekhavsky District, Russian SFSR, USSR		ENR				1976-03-06
118	9	109	0	†	COM	British European Airways Flight 548	Hawker Siddeley Trident 1C	Staines, United Kingdom		ICL	LHR-BRU	LHR	5.5 km (3.0 NM)	1972-06-18
118	7	111	0	†	COM	Trans-Canada Air Lines Flight 831	Douglas DC-8-54CF	Sainte-Thérèse, Quebec, Canada		ENR				1963-11-29
117	6	111	0	†	COM	Bellview Airlines Flight 210	Boeing 737-2L9	near Lagos, Nigeria		ENR				2005-10-22
117	11	106	0	†	COM	Air India Flight 101	Boeing 707-437	Mont Blanc massif, France		ENR				1966-01-24
116	6	110	0	†	COM	Air Algérie Flight 5017	McDonnell Douglas MD-83	near Gossi, Mali		ENR				2014-07-24
116	11	105	0	1*	COM	Sudan Airways Flight 139	Boeing 737-200C	Port Sudan, Sudan		APR		PZU	5 km (2.7 NM)	2003-07-08
116	8	108	0	†	COM	Avioimpex Flight 110	Yakovlev Yak-42	Ohrid, Republic of Macedonia		APR		OHD	2 km (1.1 NM)	1993-11-20
115	11	104	0	†	INB	Korean Air Flight 858	Boeing 707-3B5C	Andaman Sea, near Heinze Bok, Burma		ENR				1987-11-29
115	7	108	0	†	COM	Alitalia Flight 112	McDonnell Douglas DC-8-43	Cinisi, Sicily, Italy		APR		PMO	5 km (2.7 NM)	1972-05-05
114	6	108	0	†	COM	Kenya Airways Flight 507	Boeing 737-8AL	Douala, Cameroon		ENR	ABJ-DLA-NBO			2007-05-05
113	8	105	0	†	COM	Armavia Flight 967	Airbus A320-221	Black Sea, off Adler, Russia		APR		AER	6 km (3.2 NM)	2006-05-03
113	9	100	4	†	COM	Air France Flight 4590	Concorde	Gonesse, France		ICL	CDG-JFK	CDG	3.5 km (1.9 NM)	2000-07-25
113	14	99	0	†	COM	Thai Airways International Flight 311	Airbus A310-304	Langtang National Park, Nepal		ENR	DMK-KTM			1992-07-31
113	6	107	0		COM	Eastern Air Lines Flight 66	Boeing 727-225	Jamaica, New York, U.S.		LDG		JFK	0.73 km (0.39 NM)	1975-06-24
113	10	103	0	†	COM	Air France Flight 117	Boeing 707-328	near Deshaies, Guadeloupe, West Indies		APR		PTP	25 km (13 NM)	1962-06-22
112	6	106	0	1*	COM	Cubana de Aviación Flight 0972	Boeing 737-201 Adv.	Santiago de las Vegas, Cuba	Human Error	ICL		HAV	10 km (5.4 NM)	2018-05-18
112	9	103	0	†	COM	China Northern Airlines Flight 6136	McDonnell Douglas MD-82	Dalian Bay, China		APR		DLC	20 km (11 NM)	2002-05-07
112	1	111	0		COM	United Airlines Flight 232	McDonnell Douglas DC-10-10	Sioux City, Iowa, U.S.		LDG	DEN-ORD-PHL	SUX		1989-07-19
112	5	107	0	†	INB	Gulf Air Flight 771	Boeing 737-2P6	Mina Jebel Ali, United Arab Emirates		APR		AUH	80 km (43 NM)	1983-09-23
112	8	104	0	†	COM	CAAC Flight 3303	Hawker Siddeley Trident	near Yangshuo, China		APR		KWL	60 km (32 NM)	1982-04-26
112	6	106	0	†	COM	Sterling Airways Flight 296	Sud Aviation Caravelle	Fujairah, United Arab Emirates		ENR				1972-03-14
112	7	105	0	†	COM	Dan-Air Flight 1903	de Havilland Comet 4	Les Agudes mountain, Spain		ENR				1970-07-03
111	7	104	0	†	COM	Alaska Airlines Flight 1866	Boeing 727-100	near Juneau, Alaska, U.S.		APR		JNU	30 km (16 NM)	1971-09-04
111	4	0	107	†	COM	Flying Tiger Line (N228SW)	Canadair CL-44D4-1	Da Nang, Vietnam		APR		DAD	c. 1 km (0.54 NM)	1966-12-24
111	10	101	0	†	COM	Caledonian Airways Flight 153	Douglas DC-7	Douala, Cameroon		ICL		DLA	2.5 km (1.3 NM)	1962-03-04
110	5	105	0	†	COM	ValuJet Airlines Flight 592	McDonnell Douglas DC-9-32	Everglades, Florida, U.S.		ENR	MIA-ATL			1996-05-11
110	6	101	3	†	INB	Avianca Flight 203	Boeing 727-21	Bogotá, Colombia		ENR				1989-11-27
110	7	103	0	1*	COM	Aeroflot Flight 3519	Tupolev 154B-2	Yemelyanovo, Yemelyanovsky, Russian SFSR, USSR		ENR				1984-12-23
110	6	104	0	†	COM	Far Eastern Air Transport Flight 103	Boeing 737-222	Miaoli, Taiwan		ENR				1981-08-22
109	7	102	0	†	COM	Aeroflot (CCCP-75559)	Ilyushin Il-18V	Shushary, Russian SFSR, USSR		APR		LED	2.5 km (1.3 NM)	1974-04-27
109	8	101	0	†	COM	Aeroflot Flight 1036	Ilyushin Il-18V	Black Sea, off Adler, Russian SFSR, USSR		ICL		AER	4 km (2.2 NM)	1972-10-01
109	9	100	0	†	COM	Air Canada Flight 621	McDonnell Douglas DC-8-63	Vaughan, Ontario, Canada		LDG		YYZ	11 km (5.9 NM)	1970-07-05
108	7	101	0		COM	Sosoliso Airlines Flight 1145	McDonnell Douglas DC-9-32	Port Harcourt, Nigeria		LDG		PHC		2005-12-10
108	8	100	0		EXG	Orbi Georgian Airways (4L-85163)	Tupolev Tu-154B	Babushara, near Sukhumi, Abkhazia, Georgia		APR		SUI		1993-09-22
108	8	100	0		COM	China General Aviation Flight 7552	Yakovlev Yak-4200f	Nanjing, China		ICL		NKG	0.6 km (0.32 NM)	1992-07-31
108	10	98	0	†	COM	China Southwest Airlines Flight 4146	Ilyushin Il-18D	near Chongqing, China		APR		CKG	c. 32 km (17 NM)	1988-01-18
108	5	103	0		COM	Alitalia Flight 4128	McDonnell Douglas DC-9-32	Tyrrhenian Sea, off Palermo, Italy		APR		PMO	3 km (1.6 NM)	1978-12-23
108	8	100	0	†	COM	Aeroflot Flight 3932	Tupolev Tu-104	Sverdlovsk, Russian SFSR, USSR		ICL		SVX	10 km (5.4 NM)	1973-09-30
108	4	104	0		COM	Invicta International Airlines Flight 435	Vickers 952 Vanguard	Hochwald, Switzerland		APR		BSL	15 km (8.1 NM)	1973-04-10
108	8	100	0		EXS	Libyan Arab Airlines Flight 114	Boeing 727-224	Western Sinai Peninsula, Egypt		ENR				1973-02-21
107	11	96	0	†	COM	Pan Am Flight 812	Boeing 707-321B	area of Negara, Bali, Indonesia		APR		DPS	68 km (37 NM)	1974-04-22
107	8	99	0	†	COM	Aeroflot Flight 2230	Ilyushin Il-18V	Aramil, Russian SFSR, USSR		ICL		SVX	2.9 km (1.6 NM)	1967-11-16
107	11	96	0	†	COM	Flying Tiger Line Flight 739	Lockheed L-1049H Super Constellation	Pacific Ocean		ENR				1962-03-16
106	10	84	12	†	MIL	Iranian Air Force (5-8519)	Lockheed C-130E Hercules	Tehran, Iran		APR		THR	c. 5.5 km (3.0 NM)	2005-12-06
106	7	99	0	†	COM	Royal Air Maroc (OO-SRD)	Sud Aviation SE-210 Caravelle VIN	Mount Mellalyene, Tétouan, Morocco		ENR				1973-12-22
105	8	97	0	†	COM	Kam Air Flight 904	Boeing 737-242	Chaperi Ghar Mountain, Pamir Mountains, Afghanistan		ENR				2005-02-03
104	5	99	0	†	COM	Cebu Pacific Air Flight 387	McDonnell Douglas DC-9-32	Mount Sumagaya, Misamis Oriental, Philippines		ENR				1998-02-02
104	7	97	0	†	COM	SilkAir Flight 185	Boeing 737-36N	Musi River, Indonesia		ENR	CGK-SIN			1997-12-19
104	6	98	0	†	COM	Iberia Flight 602	Sud Aviation SE 210 Caravelle	Ibiza, Spain		APR		IBZ	c. 15 km (8.1 NM)	1972-01-07
104	6	11	87	†	COM	Middle East Airlines Flight 265 and Turkish Air Force (CBK-28)	Vickers Viscount 754D and Douglas C-47	Ankara, Turkey		APR/ENR		ESB	c. 20 km (11 NM)	1963-02-01
103	11	92	0	1*	COM	Afriqiyah Airways Flight 771	Airbus A330-202	Tripoli, Libya	Pilot Error	APR		TIP	c. 0.9 km (0.49 NM)	2010-05-12
103	7	66	30		COM	EAS Airlines Flight 4226	BAC One-Eleven 500	Kano, Nigeria		ENR				2002-05-04
103	7	96	0	†	MIL	Iranian Air Force	Lockheed C-130 Hercules	near Zahedan, Iran		APR				1986-11-02
102	6	96	0	†	COM	Adam Air Flight 574	Boeing 737-4Q8	Makassar Strait, Indonesia		ENR	CGK-SUB-MDC			2007-01-01
102	6	96	0	1*	COM	Air Algérie Flight 6289	Boeing 737-2T4	Tamanrasset, Algeria		ICL	TMR-GHA-ALG	TMR	1.6 km (0.86 NM)	2003-03-06
102	5	97	0	†	COM	Dominicana de Aviación Flight 603	McDonnell Douglas DC-9-32	Caribbean, off Santo Domingo, Dominican Republic		ICL		SDQ	3 km (1.6 NM)	1970-02-15
102	9	93	0	†	COM	Aeroflot Flight 558	Ilyushin Il-18V	near Spassky, Verkhneuralsky District, Russian SFSR, USSR		ENR				1972-08-31
101	11	90	0		COM	Thai Airways International Flight 261	Airbus A310-200	Surat Thani, Thailand		APR		URT	c. 4 km (2.2 NM)	1998-12-11
101	5	96	0		COM	Eastern Air Lines Flight 401	Lockheed L-1011-385-1 TriStar 1	Everglades, near Tamiami, Florida, U.S.		APR	JFK-MIA	MIA	33.6 km (18.1 NM)	1972-12-29
101	7	92	2	1*	COM	LANSA Flight 502	Lockheed L-188 Electra	Cusco, Peru		ICL		CUZ	c. 4 km (2.2 NM)	1970-08-09
101	6	95	0	†	COM	Northwest Orient Airlines Flight 293	Douglas DC-7CF	Pacific Ocean, area of Annette Island, Alaska, U.S.		ENR				1963-06-03
100	7	93	0	†	INH	Malaysian Airline System Flight 653	Boeing 737-2H6	near Tanjung Kupang, Malaysia		ENR				1977-12-04
100	7	93	0		COM	United Arab Airlines (SU-APC)	Ilyushin Il-18D	Aswan, Egypt		LDG		ASW		1969-03-20
99	(Note: It is not known how many passengers or crew were killed in the incident. However, it is known that there were 112 people on the aircraft, including 98 passengers and 14 crew members.)	(Note: It is not known how many passengers or crew were killed in the incident. However, it is known that there were 112 people on the aircraft, including 98 passengers and 14 crew members.)	2		MIL	Indonesian Air Force (A-1325)	Lockheed C-130H Hercules	near Madiun, Indonesia		APR		MDN	9 km (4.9 NM)	2009-05-20
99	6	90	3	†	COM	TAM Transportes Aéreos Regionais Flight 402	Fokker 100	São Paulo, Brazil		ICL		CGH	1.5 km (0.81 NM)	1996-10-31
99	4	95	0		COM	Aeroflot Flight 3603	Tupolev Tu-154B-2	near Norilsk, Russian SFSR, USSR		APR		NSK	0.47 km (0.25 NM)	1981-11-16
99	8	91	0	†	COM	KLM Flight 607E	Lockheed L-1049	Atlantic Ocean, area of Shannon, Ireland		ENR				1958-08-14
98	8	89	1		COM	Pakistan International Airlines Flight 8303	Airbus A320-214	Karachi, Pakistan	Pilot Error	APR		KHI	3.0 km (1.6 NM)	2020-05-22
98	8	90	0	†	COM	Khabarovsk United Air Group Flight 3949	Tupolev Tu-154B	area of Grossevichi, Khabarovsk Krai, Russia		ENR				1995-12-06
98	6	92	0		MIL	Royal Saudi Air Force (469)	Lockheed C-130H Hercules	near Khafji, Saudi Arabia		APR		OERM	unknown	1991-03-21
98	6	92	0	†	MIL	Indian Air Force Flight 203	Antonov An-12BP	Rohtang Pass, India		ENR				1968-02-07
98	6	92	0		COM	Britannia Airways Flight 105	Bristol 175 Britannia 102	Komenda, SR Slovenia, Yugoslavia		APR		LJU	3 km (1.6 NM)	1966-09-01
97	10	87	0		COM	Pan Am Flight 806	Boeing 707-321B	Pago Pago, American Samoa		APR		PPG	1.2 km (0.65 NM)	1974-01-30
97	4	93	0		COM	Aeroflot Flight 1912	Tupolev Tu-104B	Irkutsk, Russian SFSR, USSR		APR		IKT	0.15 km (0.081 NM)	1971-07-25
97	17	80	0	†	COM	Varig Flight 810	Boeing 707-441	La Cruz peak, San Juan de Miraflores, Peru		APR		LIM	c. 25 km (13 NM)	1962-11-27
96	8	88	0	†	MIL	Polish Air Force Tu-154M (101)	Tupolev Tu-154M	Smolensk, Russia		APR		***	c. 1 km (0.54 NM)	2010-04-10
96	4	92	0		COM	ADC Airlines Flight 053	Boeing 737-2B7	Abuja, Nigeria		ICL		ABV	c. 0.5 km (0.27 NM)	2006-10-29
95	6	89	0	†	COM	Indian Airlines Flight 171	Sud Aviation SE-210 Caravelle VIN	Mumbai, India		APR		BOM	0.35 km (0.19 NM)	1976-10-12
95	6	89	0	†	EXG	Air France Flight 1611	Sud Aviation SE-210 Caravelle III	Mediterranean, near Nice, France		ENR				1968-09-11
95	8	87	0	†	COM	American Airlines Flight 1	Boeing 707-123B	Jamaica Bay, New York, U.S.		ICL		IDL	c. 6 km (3.2 NM)	1962-03-01
94	7	87	0	†	COM	TAME Flight 120	Boeing 727-134	Cumbal Volcano, Colombia		APR		TUA	c. 21 km (11 NM)	2002-01-28
94	12	82	0	†	COM	Aeroflot Flight 8381 and Soviet Air Force (SSSR-26492)	Tupolev Tu-134 and Antonov An-26	Zolochiv, Ukrainian SSR, USSR		APR/ENR		LWO	68 km (37 NM)	1985-05-03
94	9	85	0	†	COM	Alitalia Flight 771	McDonnell Douglas DC-8-43	Junnar, India		ENR				1962-07-07
93	6	87	0	†	COM	Aerovias Guatemala Caravelle (HC-BAE)	Sud Aviation SE-210 Caravelle III	Flores, Guatemala		APR		FRS	8 km (4.3 NM)	1986-01-18
93	6	87	0		COM	Iberia Flight 350 and Aviaco Flight 134	Boeing 727 and McDonnell Douglas DC-9	Madrid, Spain		TOF/TXI		MAD		1983-12-07
92	8	84	0	†	MIL	Russian Air Force (RA-85572)	Tupolev Tu-154	Black Sea, off Adler, Russia		ENR				2016-12-25
92	4	88	0		COM	Indian Airlines Flight 605	Airbus A320-231	Bangalore, India		APR		VOBG	0.7 km (0.38 NM)	1990-02-14
92	7	85	0	†	COM	Trans World Airlines Flight 514	Boeing 727-231	Mount Weather, Virginia, U.S.		APR		DCA	40 km (22 NM)	1974-12-01
92	7	85	0		COM	Aeroflot Flight U-45	Ilyushin Il-18V	Bulungur District, Uzbek SSR, USSR		ENR				1970-02-06
91	5	86	0	†	MIL	Sudanese Air Force	Lockheed C-130H Hercules	Jabal Awliya, Sudan		ENR				1996-02-26
91	3	0	88	†	COM	Lloyd Aéreo Boliviano (N730JP)	Boeing 707-131F	Santa Cruz, Bolivia		ICL		SRZ	0.6 km (0.32 NM)	1976-10-13
91	6	85	0	1*	COM	LANSA Flight 508	Lockheed L-188 Electra	Puerto Inca, Peru		ENR				1971-12-24
90	8	82	0	†	COM	Ethiopian Airlines Flight 409	Boeing 737-8AS	Mediterranean, off Na'ameh, Lebanon		ICL		BEY	11 km (5.9 NM)	2010-01-25
90	5	85	0		COM	One-Two-GO Airlines Flight 269	McDonnell Douglas MD-82	Phuket, Thailand		LDG		HKT		2007-09-16
90	7	83	0	†	COM	Aeroflot Flight 5463	Tupolev Tu-134A	near Almaty, Kazakh SSR, USSR		APR		ALA	36 km (19 NM)	1983-08-30
90	8	82	0	†	COM	Aeroflot Flight 411	Ilyushin Il-62M	Mendeleyevo, Russian SFSR, USSR		ICL		SVO	11.4 km (6.2 NM)	1982-07-06
90	8	82	0	†	COM	Aeroflot Flight 3843	Tupolev Tu-104A	Almaty, Kazakh SSR, USSR		APR		ALA	3.5 km (1.9 NM)	1977-01-13
90	10	76	4		COM	Japan Air Lines Flight 471	Douglas DC-8-53	near New Delhi, India		APR		DEL	c. 20 km (11 NM)	1972-06-14
90	5	85	0	†	COM	Olympic Airways Flight 954	Douglas DC-6	Keratea, Greece		APR		***	c. 23 km (12 NM)	1969-12-08
89	8	81	0	†	MIL	Royal Saudi Air Force (453)	Lockheed C-130E Hercules	Medina, Saudi Arabia		ICL		MED	c. 1 km (0.54 NM)	1980-09-14
89	6	83	0	†	COM	Delta Air Lines Flight 723	McDonnell Douglas DC-9-31	Boston, Massachusetts, U.S.		APR		BOS	1 km (0.54 NM)	1973-07-31
88	6	82	0	†	COM	Aeroflot Flight 821	Boeing 737-505	Perm, Russia		APR		PEE	11.5 km (6.2 NM)	2008-09-14
88	5	83	0	†	COM	Alaska Airlines Flight 261	McDonnell Douglas MD-83	Pacific Ocean, off Anacapa Island, California, U.S.		ENR				2000-01-31
88	8	80	0	†	MIL	Iranian Air Force (5-8521)	Lockheed C-130 Hercules	near Mashhad, Iran		ENR				1997-03-13
88	9	79	0	†	INB	Trans World Airlines Flight 841	Boeing 707-331B	Mediterranean, area of Cephalonia, Greece		ENR				1974-09-08
88	5	83	0	†	COM	Air Ferry DC-4 G-APYK	Douglas C-54 Skymaster	Mont Canigou, France		ENR				1967-06-03
87	5	82	0		COM	Air Inter Flight 5148	Airbus A320-111	Barr, France		APR		SXB	19.5 km (10.5 NM)	1992-01-20
87	10	77	0	†	COM	LOT Polish Airlines Flight 007	Ilyushin Il-62	Warsaw, Poland		APR		WAW	0.86 km (0.46 NM)	1980-03-14
87	11	76	0	†	COM	Nigeria Airways Flight 925	Vickers VC10	Lagos, Nigeria		APR		LOS	13 km (7.0 NM)	1969-11-20
87	7	80	0	†	COM	LAN Chile Flight 107	Douglas DC-6	San José Volcano, Chile		ENR				1965-02-06
87	9	78	0		COM	Aeroflot Flight 721	Ilyushin Il-18V	near Yuzhno Sakhalinsk, Russian SFSR, USSR		APR		UUS	26 km (14 NM)	1964-09-02
87	5	82	0		MIL	US Air Force (50-0100)	Douglas C-124A Globemaster II	Moses Lake, Washington, U.S.		ICL		LRN	4 km (2.2 NM)	1952-12-20
86	6	79	1	†	COM	Aviaco Flight 118	Sud Aviation SE 210 Caravelle 10R	A Coruña, Spain		APR		LCG	11 km (5.9 NM)	1973-08-13
86	7	79	0	†	COM	Aeroflot Flight 03	Tupolev Tu-104A	near Nanaysky District, Khabarovsk Krai, Russian SFSR, USSR		ENR				1962-09-03
85	6	79	0	1*	COM	Tajikistan Airlines Flight 3183	Tupolev Tu-154B-1	Sharjah, United Arab Emirates		APR		SHJ	13 km (7.0 NM)	1997-12-15
85	5	80	0	†	COM	Braniff International Airways Flight 352	Lockheed L-188A Electra	Dawson, Texas, U.S.		ENR				1968-05-03
85	4	81	0	†	MIL	US Air Force C-123 (56-4376)	Fairchild C-123B-18-FA Provider	near Tuy Hòa, Vietnam		ENR				1965-12-11
85	4	81	0	†	COM	Paradise Airlines Flight 901A	Lockheed L-049 Constellation	Genoa, Nevada, U.S.		ENR				1964-03-01
84	7	77	0	†	COM	Aeroflot Flight 2808	Tupolev Tu-134A	Andreevo, Ivanovo Oblast, Russia		APR		IWA	3 km (1.6 NM)	1992-08-27
84	0	84	0		MIL	Fuerza Aérea Sandinista (265)	Mil Mi-8TV	near San Andres de Bocay, Nicaragua		UNK				1982-12-09
84	12	72	0	†	MIL	US Air Force (60-0373)	Boeing C-135 Stratolifter	Santiago Canyon, California, U.S.		ENR				1965-06-25
84	5	79	0	†	COM	Eastern Air Lines Flight 663	Douglas DC-7B	Atlantic Ocean, off Jones Beach, New York, U.S.		ENR				1965-02-08
84	8	76	0	†	EXG	Aeroflot Flight 902	Tupolev Tu-104A	near Voznesenka, Krasnoyarsk Krai, Russian SFSR, USSR		ENR				1962-06-30
83	4	79	0		COM	Singapore Airlines Flight 006	Boeing 747-412	Dayuan District, Taiwan		TOF		TPE		2000-10-31
83	11	72	0	†	MIL	Russian Air Force (RA-74295)	Ilyushin Il-18D	Zundagi, Adjara, Georgia		APR		BUS	18 km (9.7 NM)	2000-10-25
83	4	79	0		COM	Palair Macedonian Airlines Flight 301	Fokker 100	Petrovec, Republic of Macedonia		ICL		SKP	0.38 km (0.21 NM)	1993-03-05
83	5	78	0	†	MIL	Afghanistan Air Force	Antonov An-12	near Shindand, Afghanistan		ICL		OAH		1990-08-10
83	9	74	0	†	COM	Thai Airways Flight 365	Boeing 737-2P5	Phuket, Thailand		APR		HKT	15 km (8.1 NM)	1987-08-31
83	5	78	0	†	COM	Allegheny Airlines Flight 853 and Private aircraft (N7374J)	McDonnell Douglas DC-9-30 and Piper PA-28 Cherokee	Fairland, Indiana, U.S.		ENR				1969-09-09
83	9	74	0	1*	COM	Aeroflot Flight 15	Ilyushin Il-18D	Parchum, Chunsky District, Russian SFSR, USSR		ENR				1968-02-29
83	5	78	0		COM	American Flyers Airline Flight 280/D	Lockheed L-188 Electra	Ardmore, Oklahoma, U.S.		APR		ADM	2.4 km (1.3 NM)	1966-04-22
83	8	75	0	†	COM	British Eagle International Airlines Flight 802/6	Bristol 175 Britannia 312	Glungezer mountain, Austria		ENR				1964-02-29
83	6	77	0	†	COM	President Airlines (N90773)	Douglas DC-6B	Shannon, Ireland		ICL		SNN	1.5 km (0.81 NM)	1961-09-10
82	5	77	0		COM	Tajikistan Airlines (87995)	Yakovlev Yak-40	Khorog, Tajikistan		TOF		UTOD	0.2 km (0.11 NM)	1993-08-28
82	7	60	15	†	COM	Aeroméxico Flight 498 and Private aircraft (N4891F)	McDonnell Douglas DC-9-32 and Piper PA-28-181 Archer	Cerritos, California, U.S.		APR		LAX	c. 33 km (18 NM)	1986-08-31
82	8	74	0	†	INB	Aeroflot Flight 109	Tupolev Tu-104B	Area of Chita, Russian SFSR, USSR		ENR				1973-05-19
82	6	76	0	†	COM	Piedmont Airlines Flight 22 and Private aircraft (N31215S)	Boeing 727-22 and Cessna 310	Hendersonville, North Carolina, U.S.		ENR				1967-07-19
82	8	74	0	†	COM	TABSO Flight 101	Ilyushin Il-18B	Bratislava, Czechoslovakia		ENR				1966-11-24
81	4	77	0	†	EXS	Itavia Flight 870 (Note: Initial reports concluded a bomb had exploded on board. Subsequent investigation suggest a missile may have impacted the aircraft.)	McDonnell Douglas DC-9-15	Tyrrhenian Sea, near Ustica, Italy		ENR				1980-06-27
81	15	66	0	†	INB	Middle East Airlines Flight 438	Boeing 720-023B	As Sufayri, Hafar al-Batin, Saudi Arabia		ENR				1976-01-01
81	10	71	0	†	INB	Cathay Pacific Airways Flight 700Z	Convair 880-22M-21	area of Pleiku, Vietnam		ENR				1972-06-15
81	8	73	0	†	COM	Pan Am Flight 214	Boeing 707-121	Elkton, Maryland, U.S.		APR		PHL	55 km (30 NM)	1963-12-08
81	7	74	0	†	COM	Aeroflot Flight 415	Antonov An-10A	Kholodnaya Rechka, Gagra District, Abkhaz ASSR, Georgian SSR, USSR		APR		AER	21 km (11 NM)	1962-07-28
80	9	71	0	†	MIL	Moroccan Air Force (CAN-OQ)	Lockheed C-130 Hercules	Goulimime, Morocco		APR		GLN	10 km (5.4 NM)	2011-07-26
80	14	56	10		COM	Cubana de Aviación Flight 389	Tupolev Tu-154M	Quito, Ecuador		TOF		UIO		1998-08-29
80	4	76	0		COM	Air Mauritanie Flight 625	Fokker F28 Fellowship 4000	Tidjikja, Mauritania		LDG		TIY		1994-07-01
80	4	70	6		COM	Korean Air Flight 803	McDonnell Douglas DC-10-30	Tripoli, Libya		APR		TIP	c. 2 km (1.1 NM)	1989-07-27
80	4	76	0	†	COM	Fuerza Aérea Colombiana (FAC-902)	Douglas DC-6B	near Leticia, Colombia		ENR				1985-07-24
80	(Note: It is not known how many passengers or crew were killed in the incident. However, it is known that there were 60 people on the aircraft.)	(Note: It is not known how many passengers or crew were killed in the incident. However, it is known that there were 60 people on the aircraft.)	20	†	MIL	Iranian Air Force (5-8552)	Lockheed C-130H Hercules	Kahrizak, Iran		ENR				1981-09-29
80	7	73	0	†	COM	Union de Transportes Aériens (F-BHMS)	Douglas DC-6B	Mount Alcazaba, Spain		ENR				1964-10-02
80	5	74	1		MIL	US Air Force (61-0332)	Boeing C-135B	Angeles City, Philippines		APR		CRK	<0.1 km (0.054 NM)	1964-05-11
80	6	74	0	†	COM	Swissair Flight 306	Sud Aviation SE-210 Caravelle III	Dürrenäsch, Switzerland		ENR				1963-09-04
80	7	73	0		COM	World Airways Flight 830	Douglas DC-6A	Mount Barrigada, near Barrigada, Guam, U.S.		ENR				1960-09-19
80	9	71	0	†	COM	Aeroflot (CCCP-42362)	Tupolev Tu-104A	Vurnarsky District, Chuvash ASSR, Russian SFSR, USSR		ENR				1958-10-17
80	5	75	0		COM	Fairflight (G-AKBY)	Avro 689 Tudor V	Sigingstone, Wales, UK		APR		***	0.76 km (0.41 NM)	1950-03-12
80	4	76	0	1*	MIL	Luftwaffe	Dornier Do 24	Lake Resko, Poland		TOF				1945-03-05
79	7	72	0	†	COM	Aeroflot Flight 630	Ilyushin Il-18V	near Khujand, Tajik SSR, USSR		ENR				1973-02-24
79	6	73	0	†	MIL	US Air Force (55-4574)	Fairchild C-123K	Khánh Phu, Khánh Hòa Province, Vietnam		ENR				1970-11-27
79	7	72	0	†	COM	Mexicana de Aviación Flight 704	Boeing 727-64	El Carmen, Mexico		ENR				1969-06-04
79	6	73	0	†	COM	Maritime Central Airways Flight 315	Douglas DC-4	Issoudun, Quebec, Canada		ENR				1957-08-11
78	12	66	0	†	EXG	Siberia Airlines Flight 1812	Tupolev Tu-154M	Black Sea, area of Ünye, Turkey		ENR				2001-10-04
78	4	70	4		COM	Air Florida Flight 90	Boeing 737-222	Washington, D.C., United States		ICL		DCA	1.4 km (0.76 NM)	1982-01-13
78	7	70	1	†	MIL	Indian Air Force (L950)	Antonov An-12	Leh, India		APR		IXL	0.5 km (0.27 NM)	1978-11-19
78	3	75	0		COM	Wenela Air Services (A2-ZER)	Douglas DC-4	Francistown, Botswana		APR		FRW	3.6 km (1.9 NM)	1974-04-04
78	10	68	0	1*	COM	Pan Am Flight 816	Boeing 707-321B	Pacific Ocean, off Papeete, Tahiti, French Polynesia		ENR				1973-07-22
78	3	75	0		COM	Aviogenex Flight 130	Tupolev Tu-134A	Omišalj, SR Croatia, Yugoslavia		LDG		RJK		1971-05-23
78	5	73	0	†	COM	Trans World Airlines Flight 529	Lockheed L-049 Constellation	Hinsdale, Illinois, U.S.	Mechanical failure	ENR				1961-09-01
78	9	69	0	†	INB	Air France Flight 406	Lockheed L-1649A Starliner	near Zarzaitine, Algeria		ENR				1961-05-10
77	4	72	0	1*	MIL	Algerian Air Force (7T-WHM)	Lockheed C-130 Hercules	Aïn Kercha, Oum El Bouaghi Province, Algeria		ENR				2014-02-11
77	8	69	0		COM	Iran Air Flight 277	Boeing 727-286Adv	Urmia, Iran		APR		OMH	8 km (4.3 NM)	2011-01-09
77	0	0	77		MIL	Ukrainian Air Force (42 Blue)	Sukhoi Su-27	Lviv, Ukraine		MNV		LWO		2002-07-27
77	9	68	0	1*	MIL	Soviet Air Force (CCCP-86732)	Ilyushin IL-76M	Gyumri, Armenia		APR		LWN	15 km (8.1 NM)	1988-12-11
77	1	76	0		COM	Aeroflot Flight 5003	Ilyushin Il-18V	near Mineralnye Vody, Russian SFSR, USSR		APR		MRV	<5 km (2.7 NM)	1977-02-15
77	6	69	2	‡	MIL	Air Vietnam C-54D (XV-NUG) and US Air Force (67-0393)	Douglas C-54D-10-DC Skymaster and F-4 Phantom II	Da Nang, Vietnam		APR		DAD	3 km (1.6 NM)	1969-09-20
77	3	74	0		COM	Imperial Airlines Flight 201/8	Lockheed L-049 Constellation	Richmond, Virginia, U.S.		APR		RIC	1.5 km (0.81 NM)	1961-11-08
77	6	71	0	†	COM	Air France Flight 2005	Sud Aviation SE-210 Caravelle III	Rabat, Morocco		APR		RBA	9 km (4.9 NM)	1961-09-12
76	5	71	0	†	MIL	Afghanistan Air Force	Antonov An-32	Tashkurgan, Afghanistan		ENR				1993-04-27
76	3	73	0		COM	Vietnam Airlines Flight 831	Tupolev Tu-134	Lam Luk Ka District, Thailand		APR		DMK	6 km (3.2 NM)	1988-09-09
76	6	70	0		COM	Československé Státní Aerolinie Flight 001	Ilyushin Il-18B	Bratislava, Czechoslovakia		APR		BTS	1.5 km (0.81 NM)	1976-07-28
75	13	62	0	†	COM	Ukrainian-Mediterranean Airlines Flight 4230	Yakovlev Yak-42	Maçka, Trabzon, Turkey		APR		TZX	c. 23 km (12 NM)	2003-05-26
75	5	70	0		COM	Turkish Airlines Flight 634	Avro RJ100	Diyarbakır, Turkey		APR		DIY	0.9 km (0.49 NM)	2003-01-08
75	6	69	0		COM	Peruvian Air Force (FAP-351)	Boeing 737-282	Andoas, Peru		ENR				1998-05-05
75	5	70	0	†	MIL	Sri Lanka Air Force (CR861)	Antonov An-32B	Laccadive Sea, off Colombo, Sri Lanka		ENR				1995-09-12
75	12	63	0	†	COM	Aeroflot Flight 593	Airbus A310-304	near Mezhdurechensk, Russia		ENR				1994-03-23
75	4	71	0		COM	Inex-Adria Aviopromet Flight 450	McDonnell Douglas DC-9-32	Prague, Czechoslovakia		APR		PRG	8 km (4.3 NM)	1975-10-30
75	6	69	0	†	COM	Avensa Flight 358	McDonnell Douglas DC-9-14	near Maturín, Venezuela		ENR				1974-12-22
75	8	67	0	†	INH	Air Vietnam Flight 706	Boeing 727-121C	near Phan Rang, Vietnam		ICL		DAD		1974-09-15
75	4	71	0	†	COM	Southern Airways Flight 932	McDonnell Douglas DC-9-31	Ceredo, West Virginia, U.S.		APR		HTS	1.6 km (0.86 NM)	1970-11-14
74	6	68	0	†	EXG	Russian Air Force (RF-86868)	Ilyushin Il-76M	Yablonovo, Korochansky District, Belgorod Oblast, Russia		ENR				2024-01-24
74	4	70	0		COM	Hewa Bora Airways Flight 952	Boeing 727-022	Kisangani, DR Congo	Pilot/ATC Error	LDG		FKI	<0.1 km (0.054 NM)	2011-07-08
74	5	69	0	†	COM	Austral Líneas Aéreas Flight 2553	McDonnell Douglas DC-9-32	Nuevo Berlín, near Fray Bentos, Uruguay		ENR				1997-10-10
74	5	69	0	†	COM	Lloyd Aéreo Boliviano (CP-698)	Douglas DC-6B	Mount Choquetanga, Cordillera Kimsa Cruz, Bolivia		ENR				1969-09-26
74	10	64	0	†	COM	Linea Aeropostal Venezolana Flight 253	Lockheed L-1049 Super Constellation	New York Bight, Atlantic Ocean, area of Jones Beach, New York, U.S.		ENR				1956-06-20
73	6	67	0	†	MIL	Israeli Air Force (357) and Israeli Air Force (903)	Sikorsky S-65C-3 Yas'ur 2000 (both)	She'ar Yashuv, Israel		ENR				1997-02-04
73	8	65	0		COM	Avianca Flight 052	Boeing 707-321B	Cove Neck, New York, U.S.		APR		JFK	c. 36 km (19 NM)	1990-01-25
73	(Note: It is not known how many passengers or crew were killed in the incident. However, it is known that there were 73 people on the aircraft.)	(Note: It is not known how many passengers or crew were killed in the incident. However, it is known that there were 73 people on the aircraft.)	0	†	MIL	Ethiopian Air Force	Antonov An-26	near Addis Ababa, Ethiopia		UNK				1982-01-14
73	9	63	1		COM	Western Airlines Flight 2605	McDonnell Douglas DC-10-10	Mexico City, Mexico		LDG		MEX	1.5 km (0.81 NM)	1979-10-31
73	7	66	0	†	COM	Balkan Bulgarian Airlines Flight 107	Tupolev Tu-134	Gabare, Vratsa Province, Bulgaria		ENR				1978-03-16
73	25	48	0	†	INB	Cubana de Aviación Flight 455	Douglas DC-8-43	Atlantic Ocean, off Christ Church Parish, Barbados		ENR				1976-10-06
73	11	61	1	†	COM	Sabena Flight 548	Boeing 707-320	Kampenhout, Belgium		APR		BRU	3 km (1.6 NM)	1961-02-15
73	11	0	62	‡, †	MIL	US Air Force (42-40682)	Consolidated B-24 Liberator	Port Moresby, Papua New Guinea (then Territory of Papua)		UNK				1943-09-07
73	(Note: It is not known how many passengers or crew were killed in the incident. However, it is known that there were 76 people on the aircraft, and that 73 people were killed.)	(Note: It is not known how many passengers or crew were killed in the incident. However, it is known that there were 76 people on the aircraft, and that 73 people were killed.)	0	‡	MIL	USS Akron	Akron-class rigid airship	Atlantic Ocean, off Barnegat Light, New Jersey, U.S.						1933-04-04
72	4	68	0	†	COM	Yeti Airlines Flight 691	ATR 72-500	Pokhara, Nepal		APR		PHH	6 km (3.2 NM)	2023-01-15
72	8	15	49	†	MIL	Russian Air Force (RA-82005)	Antonov An-124-100	Irkutsk, Russia		ICL		IKT	1.6 km (0.86 NM)	1997-12-06
72	9	63	0		COM	Aeroflot Flight 892	Tupolev Tu-134A	Bohnsdorf, East Germany		APR		SXF	3.5 km (1.9 NM)	1986-12-12
72	2	61	9		COM	Southern Airways Flight 242	McDonnell Douglas DC-9-31	New Hope, Georgia, U.S.		ENR				1977-04-04
72	5	67	0	†	COM	Aeroflot Flight 2415	Tupolev Tu-104B	Dmitrovsky District, Moscow Oblast, Russian SFSR, USSR		ENR				1976-11-28
72	2	70	0		COM	Eastern Air Lines Flight 212	McDonnell Douglas DC-9-31	Charlotte, North Carolina, U.S.		APR		CLT	5.3 km (2.9 NM)	1974-09-11
72	6	66	0	†	COM	Faucett (OB-R-148)	Douglas C-54A-5-DC Skymaster	Cordillera Blanca, Peru		ENR				1967-12-08
72	3	69	0		COM	British Midland Airways Flight 542	Canadair C-4 Argonaut	Stockport, England, UK		APR		MAN	c. 9 km (4.9 NM)	1967-06-04
72	8	64	0	†	COM	Československé Státní Aerolinie Flight 511	Ilyushin Il-18V	Bouskoura, Morocco		ENR				1961-07-12
71	6	65	0	†	COM	Saratov Airlines Flight 703	Antonov An-148	near Stepanovskoye, Moscow Oblast, Russia		ICL		OSW		2018-02-11
71	7	64	0		COM	LaMia Flight 2933	Avro RJ85	Medellín, Colombia		ENR				2016-11-28
71	11	60	0	†	COM	BAL Bashkirian Airlines Flight 2937 and DHL International Aviation ME Flight 611	Tupolev Tu-154M and Boeing 757-23APF	Überlingen, Germany		ENR				2002-07-01
71	3	68	0		COM	Cameroon Airlines Flight 3701	Boeing 737-200	Douala, Cameroon		APR		DLA	6 km (3.2 NM)	1995-12-03
71	9	43	19	†	COM	EgyptAir Flight 864	Boeing 707-366C	Bangkok, Thailand		APR		DMK	2 km (1.1 NM)	1976-12-25
70	8	62	0	†	COM	Aerosvit Ukrainian Airlines Flight 241	Yakovlev Yak-42	Pierian Mountains, Greece		ENR				1997-12-17
70	9	61	0	†	COM	Aeroperú Flight 603	Boeing 757-23A	Pacific Ocean, area of Lima, Peru		ENR				1996-10-02
70	7	63	0	†	COM	Mandala Airlines Flight 660	Vickers Viscount 816	Mount Lalaboy, Ambon Island, Indonesia		APR		AMQ	15 km (8.1 NM)	1992-07-24
70	3	0	67	†	MIL	Italian Air Force (MM54481), (MM54474), (MM54552)	Aermacchi MB-339 PAN (x3)	Ramstein-Miesenbach, West Germany		MNV		RMS		1988-08-28
70	4	66	0		COM	Aeroflot Flight 6502	Tupolev Tu-134A	Kurumoch, Samara Oblast, Russian SFSR, USSR		LDG		KUF		1986-10-20
70	6	64	0	1*	COM	Galaxy Airlines Flight 203	Lockheed L-188 Electra	Reno, Nevada, U.S.		ICL		RNO	3 km (1.6 NM)	1985-01-21
70	7	63	0	†	COM	Transportes Aéreos del Cesar (HK-1810)	Sud Aviation SE-210 Caravelle	Riohacha, Colombia		ENR				1980-12-21
70	9	61	0	†	COM	Aeroflot Flight 7957 and Aeroflot Flight 31	Antonov An-24 and Yakovlev Yak-40	Black Sea, near Anapa, Russian SFSR, USSR		ENR				1976-09-09
70	5	65	0		COM	Trans World Airlines Flight 128	Convair CV-880-22-1	Hebron, Kentucky, U.S.		APR		CVG	2.9 km (1.6 NM)	1967-11-20
69	6	63	0		MIL	Colombian Air Force (FAC1016)	Lockheed C-130H Hercules	Puerto Leguízamo, Putumayo, Colombia		ICL	LQM-PUU	LQM	1.5 km (0.81 NM)	2026-03-23
69	6	63	0	†	COM	Indian Airlines Flight 257	Boeing 737-2A8	Imphal, India		APR		IMF	8 km (4.3 NM)	1991-08-16
69	9	59	1		COM	Aeroflot Flight 331	Ilyushin Il-62M	Boyeros, Cuba		APR		HAV	1 km (0.54 NM)	1977-05-27
69	7	62	0	†	COM	Merpati Nusantara Airlines (PK-MVS)	Vickers Viscount 828	Mentawai Strait, off Padang, Indonesia		ENR				1971-11-10
69	9	60	0	†	COM	Fuerza Aérea Argentina (TC-48)	Douglas C-54 Skymaster	Central America (Note: Aircraft wreckage was never located.)		ENR				1965-11-03
68	7	61	0	†	COM	Aero Caribbean Flight 883	ATR 72-212	Guasimal, Cuba		ENR				2010-11-04
68	4	64	0	†	COM	Simmons Airlines Flight 4184	ATR 72-212	near Roselawn, Indiana, U.S.		APR		ORD	108 km (58 NM)	1994-10-31
68	2	66	0		COM	Asiana Airlines Flight 733	Boeing 737-5L9	Mokpo, South Korea		APR		MPK	7 km (3.8 NM)	1993-07-26
68	10	58	0	†	COM	Fuerza Aérea Venezolana C-130H (7772)	Lockheed C-130H Hercules	Lajes, Azores, Portugal		APR		TER	<1 km (0.54 NM)	1976-09-03
68	7	61	0	†	COM	Iberia Flight 504 and Spantax Flight 400	McDonnell Douglas DC-9-32 and Convair CV-990-30A-5	La Planche, France		ENR				1973-03-05
68	4	64	0	†	COM	Toa Domestic Airlines Flight 63	NAMC YS-11A-217	Yokotsu Mountain, Hakodate, Japan		ENR				1971-07-03
68	9	59	0	†	COM	Trans World Airlines Flight 891	Lockheed L-1649 Starliner	Busto Arsizio, Italy		ENR				1959-06-26
67	7	60	0	†	COM	PSA Airlines Flight 5342 and United States Army (00-26860)	Bombardier CRJ701ER and Sikorsky UH-60L Black Hawk	Washington, D.C., U.S.		APR		DCA		2025-01-29
67	4	63	0	†	COM	Transporte Aéreo Militar (TAM-44)	Convair CV-440-12	Cordillera Oriental, La Paz Department, Bolivia		ENR				1975-10-27
67	8	59	0	†	COM	Aeroflot Flight 25	Ilyushin Il-18	Urakhcha, Rybno-Slobodsky District, Tatar ASSR, Russian SFSR, USSR		ENR				1963-04-04
67	7	60	0	†	COM	Aerolíneas Argentinas Flight 644	Douglas DC-6	Cachari, Buenos Aires, Argentina		ENR				1961-07-19
67	10	57	0	†	MIL	US Air Force (50-0702)	Boeing C-97C-35-BO	Pacific Ocean		ENR				1957-03-22
66	6	60	0	†	COM	Iran Aseman Airlines Flight 3704	ATR 72-212	Mount Dena, Zagros Mountains near Semirom, Iran		ENR				2018-02-18
66	10	56	0	†	COM	EgyptAir Flight 804	Airbus A320-232	eastern Mediterranean Sea		ENR				2016-05-19
66	7	59	0	†	COM	Iran Aseman Airlines Flight 746	Fokker F28 Fellowship 1000	Natanz, Iran		ENR				1994-10-12
66	4	62	0		COM	Turkish Airlines Flight 301	Fokker F28-1000 Fellowship	Cumaovası, Turkey		TOF		ADB		1974-01-26
66	4	62	0		COM	Aeroflot Flight 141	Tupolev Tu-154	Prague, Czechoslovakia		APR		PRG	0.5 km (0.27 NM)	1973-02-19
66	7	59	0	†	INB	Cyprus Airways Flight 284	de Havilland Comet 4	Mediterranean, near Demre, Turkey		ENR				1967-10-12
66	3	63	0	†	COM	United Airlines Flight 409	Douglas DC-4	Medicine Bow Peak, Wyoming, U.S.		ENR				1955-10-06
66	11	55	0	†	MIL	United States Air Force (53-3222) and (53-7841)	Fairchild C-119 Flying Boxcar (x2)	near Altensteig, West Germany		MNV				1955-08-11
66	9	57	0	†	COM	United States Navy (131612)	Douglas R6D-1 (DC-6)	Pali Kea Peak, Waianae Range, Oahu, Hawaii, U.S.		APR		HNL	24 km (13 NM)	1955-03-22
65	0	65	0		COM	Iran Aseman Airlines Flight 6895	Boeing 737-219	Bishkek, Kyrgyzstan		APR		FRU	c. 2 km (1.1 NM)	2008-08-24
65	3	60	2		COM	Líneas Aéreas Privadas Argentinas Flight 3142	Boeing 737-204C	Palermo, Argentina		TOF		AEP		1999-08-31
65	6	59	0	1*	COM	Vietnam Airlines Flight 815	Tupolev Tu-134	Phnom Penh, Cambodia		APR		PNH	0.3 km (0.16 NM)	1997-09-03
65	7	58	0	†	COM	Aviateca Flight 901	Boeing 737-200	San Vicente volcano, El Salvador		APR		SAL	24 km (13 NM)	1995-08-09
65	8	57	0	†	COM	Aeroflot Flight 1969	Antonov An-10	Lutuhyne, Ukrainian SSR, USSR		APR		VSG	13 km (7.0 NM)	1971-03-31
65	2	63	0		COM	American Airlines Flight 320	Lockheed L-188 Electra	East River, New York, U.S.		APR		LGA	1.5 km (0.81 NM)	1959-02-03
64	10	54	0		COM	Canadian Pacific Air Lines Flight 402	Douglas DC-8-43	Tokyo, Japan		APR		HND	0.85 km (0.46 NM)	1966-03-04
64	3	61	0		COM	Aeroflot Flight 20	Ilyushin Il-18B	Almaty, Kazakh SSR, USSR		APR		ALA	0.2 km (0.11 NM)	1965-01-04
64	11	53	0	†	COM	Aeroflot Flight 04	Tupolev Tu-104A	near Chita, Russian SFSR, USSR		ENR				1958-08-15
63	5	58	0	†	COM	Hellenic Air Force (748)	Lockheed C-130H Hercules	Mount Othrys, Greece		ENR				1991-02-05
63	3	60	0		INH	Iraqi Airways Flight 163	Boeing 737-270C	near Arar, Saudi Arabia		ENR				1986-12-25
63	5	58	0	†	COM	Aeroflot Flight 5484	Tupolev Tu-124V	near Kirsanov, Russian SFSR, USSR		ENR				1979-08-29
63	8	55	0	†	COM	Aeroflot Flight 6551	Ilyushin Il-18	Maksut, Zharma District, Kazakh SSR, USSR		ENR				1973-05-11
63	8	55	0	†	COM	British European Airways Flight 706	Vickers 951 Vanguard	Aarsele, Belgium		ENR				1971-10-02
63	11	52	0	†	COM	Air France Flight 212 (F-BLCJ)	Boeing 707-328C	La Grande Soufrière volcano, Guadeloupe		APR		PTP	27.5 km (14.8 NM)	1968-03-05
63	8	55	0	†	COM	United Arab Airlines Flight 869 (Note: Not to be confused with United Arab Airlines Flight 869 (1962) which crashed flying the same route one year earlier.)	de Havilland Comet 4C	Arabian Sea, off Bombay Airport		APR			10 km (6.2 mi)	1963-07-27
63	8	55	0	†	COM	Air France Flight 343	Lockheed L-1049G	Yoff, Senegal		APR		DKR	1.6 km (0.86 NM)	1960-08-29
63	6	57	0	†	COM	Northwest Orient Airlines Flight 710	Lockheed L-188C Electra	Cannelton, Indiana, U.S.		ENR				1960-03-17
62	4	58	0	†	COM	Voepass Linhas Aéreas Flight 2283	ATR 72-500	Vinhedo, São Paulo, Brazil		ENR				2024-08-09
62	12	50	0	†	COM	Sriwijaya Air Flight 182	Boeing 737-524	Java Sea, Indonesia	Mechanical Failure	ENR				2021-01-09
62	7	55	0	†	COM	Flydubai Flight 981	Boeing 737-8KN	Rostov-on-Don, Russia		LDG		ROV		2016-03-19
62	6	56	0	†	MIL	Sri Lanka Air Force (CR862)	Antonov An-32B	Jaffna, Sri Lanka		APR		JAF	13 km (7.0 NM)	1995-11-22
62	5	56	1	†	COM	Aeroflot Flight 2003	Tupolev Tu-124V	Kokoshkino, Moscow Oblast, Russian SFSR, USSR		ICL		VKO	7 km (3.8 NM)	1976-01-03
62	11	51	0	†	COM	Air France Flight 212 (F-BHSZ)	Boeing 707-328B	Caribbean Sea, off Maiquetía, Venezuela		ENR				1969-12-04
62	3	59	0		COM	Eastern Air Lines Flight 375	Lockheed L-188 Electra	Boston, Massachusetts, U.S.		ICL		BOS	c. 1 km (0.54 NM)	1960-10-04
62	3	59	0	†	COM	Trans-Canada Air Lines Flight 810-9	Canadair North Star	Slesse Mountain, British Columbia, Canada		ENR				1956-12-09
61	11	50	0	†	COM	China Southwest Airlines Flight 4509	Tupolev Tu-154M	Wenzhou, Zhejiang, China		APR		WNZ	1 km (0.54 NM)	1999-02-24
61	3	58	0	†	MIL	Russian Air Force	Mil Mi-8T	near Lata, Georgia		UNK				1992-12-14
61	4	57	0	†	COM	Garuda Indonesian Airways (PK-GVE)	Fokker F28-1000 Fellowship	Mount Sibayak, near Berastagi, Indonesia		ENR				1979-07-11
61	9	52	0		COM	Japan Air Lines Flight 446	McDonnell Douglas DC-8-62	Moscow, Russian SFSR, USSR		ICL		SVO		1972-11-28
61	5	56	0		COM	Royal Air Maroc (CN-CCV)	Sud Aviation SE-210 Caravelle III	Berrechid, Morocco		APR		CMN	5.5 km (3.0 NM)	1970-04-01
61	4	57	0	†	COM	Aer Lingus Flight 712	Vickers Viscount 803	St George's Channel, off Wexford, Ireland		ENR				1968-03-24
61	14	47	0	†	COM	Viasa Flight 897	Douglas DC-8-53	Atlantic Ocean, off Fonte da Telha, Lisboa, Portugal		ENR				1961-05-30
61	11	50	0		COM	US Navy (131582) and Real Transportes Aéreos Flight 751	Douglas R6D-1 (DC-6A) and Douglas DC-3	Guanabara Bay, Brazil		APR		GIG	<5 km (2.7 NM)	1960-02-25
61	9	52	0		COM	Sabena (OO-SFA)	Douglas DC-7C	Casablanca, Morocco		APR		CAS	0.6 km (0.32 NM)	1958-05-18
61	6	55	0	†	COM	Aerolíneas Argentinas Flight 670	Douglas DC-4	near Bolívar, Argentina		ENR				1957-12-08
61	3	0	58	†	MIL	US Army Air Force (42-50291)	Consolidated B-24 Liberator	Freckleton, England, UK		APR		EGNO	c. 1.3 km (0.70 NM)	1944-08-23
60	6	54	0	†	COM	Equatorial Express Airlines (3C-VQR)	Antonov An-24B	Baney, Equatorial Guinea		ENR				2005-07-16
60	6	49	5		COM	Alliance Air Flight 7412	Boeing 737-2A8	Patna, Bihar, India		APR		PAT	2 km (1.1 NM)	2000-07-17
60	10	50	0	†	COM	TAROM Flight 371	Airbus A310-324	Balotești, Romania		ENR				1995-03-31
60	(Note: It is not known how many passengers or crew were killed in the incident. However, it is known that there were 60 people on the aircraft.)	(Note: It is not known how many passengers or crew were killed in the incident. However, it is known that there were 60 people on the aircraft.)	0	†	MIL	Georgian Air Force	Mil Mi-8	near Svaneti, Georgia		UNK				1993-10-04
60	3	57	0	†	EXG	Sudan Airways (ST-ADY)	Fokker F27 Friendship 400M	near Malakal, Sudan (now in South Sudan)		ENR				1986-08-16
60	2	60	0		INH	EgyptAir Flight 648	Boeing 737-266	Luqa, Malta		STD		MLA		1985-11-24
60	10	50	0	†	COM	Malév Flight 240	Tupolev Tu-154B	Mediterranean, off Beirut, Lebanon		APR		BEY	10 km (5.4 NM)	1975-09-30
60	5	55	0		COM	Air Inter Flight 696Y	Vickers Viscount 724	Noirétable, France		ENR				1972-10-27
59	6	53	0	†	COM	Fuerza Aérea del Peru (FAP-329)	de Havilland Canada DHC-5	Tarma, Peru		ENR				1989-06-21
59	5	54	0	†	EXG	Air Rhodesia Flight 827	Vickers Viscount 748D	near Kariba, Zimbabwe (then Rhodesia)		ENR				1979-02-12
59	0	59	0		COM	Libyan Arab Airlines (LZ-BTN)	Tupolev Tu-154	Ar Rajma, Libya		ENR/LDG				1977-12-02
59	4	55	0	†	COM	SAETA Flight 011	Vickers Viscount 785D	Chimborazo volcano, Ecuador		ENR				1976-08-15
59	4	55	0		COM	Lufthansa Flight 540	Boeing 747-130	Nairobi, Kenya		TOF		NBO	1.1 km (0.59 NM)	1974-11-20
59	3	12	44	†	MIL	Korean Air Force	Curtiss C-46	near Yeouido, South Korea		ENR				1967-04-08
59	2	57	0		MIL	US Marine Corps (149802)	Lockheed KC-130F Hercules	Kowloon Bay, Hong Kong, China		TOF		HKG		1965-08-24
59	9	50	0	†	COM	Aeroflot Flight 245	Ilyushin Il-18B	Chebotovka, Tarasovsky District, Russian SFSR, USSR		ENR				1961-12-17
59	4	55	0	†	COM	Lloyd Aéreo Boliviano (CP-609)	Douglas DC-4	Arbieto, Bolivia		ENR				1960-02-05
59	9	50	0	†	COM	US Navy (131588)	Douglas R6D-1	Porcupine Seabight, Atlantic Ocean		ENR				1956-10-10
59	4	55	0	†	MIL	US Army Air Force (44-78591)	Curtiss C-46F-1-CU	Fangshan, Fangshan District, China		APR		NAY	25 km (13 NM)	1945-10-12
58	6	52	0	†	MIL	Yemen Air Force	Antonov An-12	Sirwah, Yemen		ENR				1992-07-14
58	3	55	0		COM	Aeroflot Flight 7841	Tupolev Tu-134AK	Minsk, Byelorussian SSR, USSR		ICL		MSQ	10 km (5.4 NM)	1985-02-01
58	1	57	0		COM	Aeroflot Flight 1691	Tupolev Tu-104B	Moscow, Russian SFSR, USSR		ENR				1979-03-17
58	5	53	0	†	INB	Air Vietnam (XV-NUI)	Douglas C-54D-15-DC Skymaster	Buôn Ma Thuột, Vietnam		APR		BMV	6.5 km (3.5 NM)	1973-03-19
58	2	55	1	†	COM	Pan African Airlines (N90427)	Douglas C-54B-1-DC Skymaster	Agwa, Rivers State, Nigeria		APR		PHC	1.5 km (0.81 NM)	1968-09-28
58	5	53	0		COM	American Airlines Flight 383	Boeing 727-23	Hebron, Kentucky, U.S.		APR		CVG	3 km (1.6 NM)	1965-11-08
58	7	51	0	†	COM	Eastern Air Lines Flight 304	Douglas DC-8	Lake Pontchartrain, Louisiana, U.S.		ENR				1964-02-25
58	9	49	0		COM	KLM Flight 844	Lockheed 1049E	Biak Island, Indonesia		ENR				1957-07-16
58	7	51	0	†	EXS	El Al Israel Airlines Flight 402/26	Lockheed L-149 Constellation	near Petrich, Bulgaria		ENR				1955-07-27
58	8	50	0	†	COM	Transocean Air Lines Flight 512	Douglas DC-6	Pacific Ocean		ENR				1953-07-12
58	7	51	0	†	COM	Curtiss Reid Flying Services (CF-EDN)	Douglas C-54B-1-DC	Grande Tête de l'Obiou mountain, France		ENR				1950-11-13
58	3	55	0	†	COM	Northwest Orient Airlines Flight 2501	Douglas DC-4	Lake Michigan, off Benton Harbor, Michigan, U.S.		ENR				1950-06-23
58	5	0	53	†	COM	Japan Air Transport (J-BJDO) and Imperial Japanese Army Air Service (J-BIDH)	Fokker Super Universal and Mitsubishi Ki1	Tokyo, Japan		ENR				1938-08-24
57	7	50	0	†	COM	Atlasjet Flight 4203	McDonnell Douglas MD-83	Keçiborlu, Turkey		APR		ISE	12 km (6.5 NM)	2007-11-30
57	5	52	0	†	COM	ASA Pesada (D2-FCG)	Antonov An-26	Luanda, Angola		ENR				2000-11-15
57	5	52	0		COM	Turkish Airlines Flight 278	Boeing 737-4Y0	Van, Turkey		APR		VAN	4 km (2.2 NM)	1994-12-29
57	7	50	0	†	MIL	Soviet Air Force (CCCP-76569)	Ilyushin Il-76MD	Caspian Sea off Sumqayit, Azerbaijan SSR, USSR		ENR				1989-10-18
57	5	52	0	†	COM	SAETA Flight 011	Vickers Viscount 785D	Pastaza Province, Ecuador		ENR				1979-04-23
57	4	53	0	†	COM	Aeroflot Flight 2174	Antonov An-24B	Atamanovka, Saratov Oblast, Russian SFSR, USSR		APR		RTW	13 km (7.0 NM)	1971-12-01
57	5	52	0	†	COM	Civil Air Transport Flight 106	Curtiss C-46D-10-CU	Jiaoxi, Taiwan		ICL		RMQ	c. 8.5 km (4.6 NM)	1964-06-20
56	2	54	0		COM	Martinair Flight 495	McDonnell Douglas DC-10-30CF	Faro, Portugal		LDG		FAO		1992-12-21
56	2	54	0		COM	Aeroflot Flight A-13	Antonov An-24B	Neftyanyye Kamni, Azerbaijan		ENR				1973-08-18
56	1	50	5		COM	Varig Flight 837	Douglas DC-8-33	Monrovia, Liberia		APR		ROB	1.9 km (1.0 NM)	1967-03-05
56	4	52	0		COM	Avianca Flight 03	Douglas C-54	Cartagena Bay, off Cartagena, Colombia		ICL		CTG	1.3 km (0.70 NM)	1966-01-15
56	4	52	0	†	COM	Miami Airlines (N1678M)	Curtiss C-46F-1-CU	Hillside, New Jersey, U.S.		ENR				1951-12-16
55	6	47	2	†	COM	China Eastern Airlines Flight 5210	Bombardier CRJ-200LR	Baotou, Inner Mongolia, China		ICL		BAV	2 km (1.1 NM)	2004-11-21
55	7	48	0	†	EXG	Lionair Flight 602	Antonov An-24	Palk Strait, off Mannar, Sri Lanka		ENR				1998-09-29
55	1	54	0		COM	China Northwest Airlines Flight 2119	British Aerospace 146	Yinchuan, China		TOF		INC		1993-07-23
55	2	53	0		COM	Indian Airlines Flight 491	Boeing 737-2A8	Aurangabad, India		TOF		IXU	1.9 km (1.0 NM)	1993-04-26
55	5	50	0	†	COM	Partnair Flight 394	Convair CV-580	Skagerrak, near Hirtshals, Denmark		ENR				1989-09-08
55	2	53	0		COM	British Airtours Flight 328	Boeing 737-236	Manchester, England, UK		TOF		MAN		1985-08-22
55	8	47	0		COM	Transbrasil Flight 303	Boeing 727-27C	Morro da Virgínia, Santa Catarina, Brazil		APR		FLN	24 km (13 NM)	1980-04-12
55	4	51	0	†	COM	Aeroflot Flight H-826	Antonov An-24B	Preobrazhenka, Dnipropetrovsk Oblast, Ukrainian SSR, USSR		ENR				1969-08-03
55	7	48	0	†	COM	Air Afrique (F-BIAO)	Douglas DC-6B	Mount Cameroon, Cameroon		ENR				1963-05-03
55	7	48	0	†	COM	Trans World Airlines Flight 903	Lockheed L-749A	Wadi Natrun, Egypt		ENR				1950-08-31
55	4	51	0	1*	COM	Eastern Air Lines Flight 537 and Bolivian Air Force (NX26927)	Douglas DC-4 and Lockheed P-38 Lightning	Alexandria, Virginia, U.S.		APR		DCA	0.8 km (0.43 NM)	1949-11-01
54	3	51	0		EXS	IBM Airlines (5Y-CKD)	Boeing 737-290C Advanced	Nyala Airport, Nyala, South Darfur, Sudan		STD				2025-05-03
54	5	49	0	†	COM	Trigana Air Flight 267	ATR 42-300	Mount Tangok, Pegunungan Bintang Regency, Papua, Indonesia		ENR				2015-08-16
54	7	47	0	†	COM	China Airlines Flight 204	Boeing 737-209	Chiashan Mountains, Hualien City, Taiwan		ENR				1989-10-26
54	5	49	0	†	COM	Pakistan International Airlines Flight 404	Fokker F27 Friendship 200	Bunji, Pakistan		ENR				1989-08-25
54	(Note: It is not known how many passengers or crew were killed in the incident. However, it is known that there were 54 people on the aircraft.)	(Note: It is not known how many passengers or crew were killed in the incident. However, it is known that there were 54 people on the aircraft.)	0	†	MIL	Ethiopian Air Force	Antonov An-12	near Asmara, Eritrea		UNK				1987-01-13
54	2	52	0		COM	Aeroflot Flight 2306	Tupolev Tu-134AK	<near Kopsa, Komi ASSR, Russian SFSR, USSR		ENR				1986-07-02
54	10	44	0	†	MIL	Israeli Air Force (960)	Sikorsky CH-53 Sea Stallion	Jordan Valley		UNK				1977-05-10
54	4	50	0	†	COM	Alia Royal Jordanian Airlines (JY-ACQ)	Handley Page HPR-7 Herald 207	Al-Dimas, Syria		ENR				1965-04-10
54	5	49	0	†	COM	Real Transportes Aéreos Flight 435	Convair CV-340-62	Guanabara Bay, Brazil		APR		GIG	c. 3 km (1.6 NM)	1960-06-24
54	9	45	0		COM	Transports Aériens Intercontinentaux Flight 307	Douglas DC-7C	Mérignac, France		ICL		BOD	<1 km (0.54 NM)	1959-09-24
53	10	43	0	†	COM	Air France Flight 422	Boeing 727-230	Monserrate, Bogotá, Colombia		ENR				1998-04-20
53	6	47	0	†	COM	Federal Airlines (ST-FAG)	Antonov An-24RV	Khartoum North, Sudan		LDG		(Note: Several missed approaches due to a sandstorm necessitated a failed forced landing in a Khartoum suburb. Despite LDG phase, there was no immediate target airport)		1996-05-03
53	5	48	0	†	COM	Lineas Aéreas del Estado Flight 072	Fokker F-27 Friendship 400M	near Champaqui, Córdoba, Argentina		ENR				1995-11-08
53	(Note: It is not known how many passengers or crew were killed in the incident. However, it is known that there were 55 people on the aircraft, and that 53 of the 55 people on board were killed in the incident.)	(Note: It is not known how many passengers or crew were killed in the incident. However, it is known that there were 55 people on the aircraft, and that 53 of the 55 people on board were killed in the incident.)	0		EXG	Bakhtar Alwatana (YA-BAL)	Antonov An-26	near Khost, Afghanistan		ENR				1987-06-11
53	4	0	49	†	COM	Aeroservicios Ecuatorianos Flight 767-103	Douglas DC-8-55F	Concepción, Quito Canton, Ecuador		TOF		UIO		1984-09-18
53	2	51	0		COM	Nigeria Airways Flight 250	Fokker F28 Fellowship 2000	Enugu, Nigeria		APR		ENU	3.3 km (1.8 NM)	1983-11-28
53	4	49	0	†	MIL	Korean Air Force (56-4391)	Fairchild C-123J	Seongnam, South Korea		TOF		SSN		1982-06-01
53	6	47	0	†	MIL	Korean Air Force	Fairchild C-123J	Hallasan, South Korea		ENR				1982-02-06
53	5	48	0	†	COM	LOT Polish Airlines Flight 165	Antonov An-24W	Polica Mountain, Poland		ENR				1969-04-02
53	9	44	0	†	MIL	US Air Force (49-0244)	Douglas C-124A Globemaster II	area of Biscay Abyssal Plain, Atlantic Ocean		ENR				1951-03-23
53	1	52	0		COM	Strato-Freight (NC92857)	Curtiss C-46D-5-CU	Atlantic Ocean off San Juan, Puerto Rico, U.S.		ICL		SIG	10 km (5.4 NM)	1949-06-07
53	4	49	0	†	COM	Eastern Air Lines Flight 605	Douglas DC-4	Bainbridge, Maryland, U.S.		ENR				1947-05-30
53	4	49	0	†	COM	Avianca (C-114)	Douglas DC-4	Mount El Tablazo, Subachoque, Colombia		ENR				1947-02-15
53	1	0	52	†	MIL	Colombian Air Force	Curtiss Hawk II	Campo de Marte, Bogotá, Colombia		ENR				1938-07-24
53	2	50	0		COM	Azerbaijan Airlines Flight A-56	Tupolev Tu-134B	Nakhchivan, Azerbaijan		ICL		NAJ	3.8 km (2.1 NM)	1995-12-05
53	(Note: It is not known how many passengers or crew were killed in the incident. However, it is known that there were 104 people on the aircraft, including 96 passengers and eight crew members.)		3		MIL	Philippine Air Force (5125)	Lockheed C-130H Hercules	Patikul, Sulu, Philippines		APR		JOL		2021-07-04
52	3	49	0	†	EXG	Sri Lanka Air Force (4R-HVA)	British Aerospace BAe-748-357 Srs. 2b	near Jaffna, Sri Lanka		APR		JAF	unknown	1995-04-29
52	4	42	6	†	MIL	Kenya Air Force (214)	de Havilland Canada DHC-5D Buffalo	Eastleigh, Nairobi, Kenya		APR		HKRE	1.7 km (0.92 NM)	1992-04-16
52	(Note: It is not known how many passengers or crew were killed in the incident. However, it is known that there were 52 people on the aircraft.)	(Note: It is not known how many passengers or crew were killed in the incident. However, it is known that there were 52 people on the aircraft.)	0	†	MIL	Fuerza Aérea Hondureña (FAH-556)	Lockheed C-130 Hercules	near Mocorón Airport, Honduras		APR				1986-08-14
52	5	47	0	†	EXG	Bakhtar Afghan Airlines (YA-BAM)	Antonov An-26	Senjaray, Kandahar Province, Afghanistan		ENR				1985-09-04
52	6	46	0	†	COM	Aeroflot Flight 1802	Antonov An-24RV	Chernihiv, Ukrainian SSR, USSR		ENR				1976-05-15
52	5	47	0	†	COM	Lineas Aéreas del Estado (TC-72) (1975)	Fokker F-27 Friendship 400M	Pilcaniyeu, Argentina		APR		BRC	35 km (19 NM)	1975-03-16
52	4	48	0	†	COM	Aeroflot Flight H-63	Antonov An-24B	Vinnytsia, Ukrainian SSR, USSR		APR		VIN	c. 2.5 km (1.3 NM)	1971-11-12
52	6	46	0	†	INB	Canadian Pacific Air Lines Flight 21	Douglas DC-6B	near 100 Mile House, British Columbia, Canada		ENR				1965-07-08
52	12	40	0	†	COM	Aerolíneas Argentinas Flight 322	de Havilland Comet 4	Campinas, Brazil		ICL		VCP	2 km (1.1 NM)	1961-11-23
52	8	44	0	†	COM	Československé Státní Aerolinie Flight 511	Ilyushin Il-18	Igensdorf, West Germany		ENR				1961-03-28
52	7	13	32	†	MIL	US Air Force (55-0291)	Convair C-131 Samaritan	Munich, West Germany		ENR				1960-12-17
52	3	49	0		COM	Transports Aériens Intercontinentaux (F-BGOD)	Douglas DC-6B	near New Cairo, Egypt		APR		CAI	29 km (16 NM)	1956-02-20
52	11	41	0	†	MIL	US Air Force (51-0107)	Douglas C-124A-DL Globemaster II	Colony Glacier, Mount Gannett, Chugach Mountains, Alaska, U.S.		ENR				1952-11-22
52	0	52	0		COM	Pan Am Flight 526A	Douglas DC-4	Atlantic Ocean, off San Juan, Puerto Rico, U.S.		ENR				1952-04-11
52	12	40	0	†	COM	Air France Flight 072	Latécoère 631	Atlantic Ocean		ENR				1948-08-01
52	5	47	0	†	COM	United Air Lines Flight 608	Douglas DC-6	Bryce Canyon, Utah, U.S.		ENR				1947-10-24
52	42	10	0	‡, †	MIL	French airship Dixmude	Zeppelin-type rigid airship	Mediterranean, off Sicily, Italy						1923-12-21
51	4	47	0		COM	US-Bangla Airlines Flight 211	Bombardier Dash 8-Q400	Kathmandu, Nepal		LDG		KTM		2018-03-12
51	4	17	30		COM	Malift Air (9Q-COS)	Antonov An-26	Kinshasa, DR Congo		TOF		FIH	2.0 km (1.1 NM)	2007-10-04
51	6	45	0	†	MIL	Afghanistan Air Force	Antonov An-32	Khojak Pass, Pakistan		APR		UET	110 km (59 NM)	1998-01-13
51	5	46	0	1*	COM	Intercontinental de Aviación Flight 256	Douglas DC-9-14	near María La Baja, Colombia		APR		CTG	56 km (30 NM)	1995-01-11
51	4	47	0	†	COM	Aeroflot-Yugavia Flight 519	Yakovlev Yak-40	Mount Kukurtbash, Untsukulsky District, Dagestan ASSR, Russian SFSR, USSR		APR		MCX	23 km (12 NM)	1991-11-07
51	6	45	0	1*	COM	Air Mali (TZ-ACT)	Antonov An-24B	Timbuktu, Mali		ICL		TOM	3 km (1.6 NM)	1985-02-22
51	6	45	0	†	COM	Soviet Navy (CCCP-42332)	Tupolev Tu-104A	Pushkinsky District, Leningrad, Russian SFSR, USSR		ENR				1981-02-07
51	6	45	0	†	COM	Aeroflot Flight 2022	Tupolev Tu-124V	Karacharovo, Volokolamsky District, Russian SFSR, USSR		ENR				1973-12-16
51	9	42	0	†	COM	Pan Am Flight 217	Boeing 707-321B	Atlantic Ocean, off Maiquetía, Venezuela		APR		CCS	c. 9 km (4.9 NM)	1968-12-12
51	5	46	0	1*	COM	Austral Líneas Aéreas Flight 205	Curtiss C-46A-50-CU	Atlantic Ocean off Mar del Plata, Argentina		APR		MDQ	1.2 km (0.65 NM)	1959-01-16
51	7	44	0	†	COM	Panair do Brasil Flight 099	Lockheed Constellation	São Leopoldo, Brazil		ENR				1950-07-28
50	6	44	0	†	COM	Tatarstan Airlines Flight 363	Boeing 737-53A	Kazan, Russia	Pilot Error	LDG		KZN		2013-11-17
50	4	45	1	†	COM	Colgan Air Flight 3407	Bombardier DHC8-402 Q400	Clarence Center, New York, U.S.		APR		BUF	10 km (5.4 NM)	2009-02-12
50	(Note: It is not known how many passengers or crew were killed in the incident. However, it is known that there were 50 people on the aircraft.)	(Note: It is not known how many passengers or crew were killed in the incident. However, it is known that there were 50 people on the aircraft.)	0	†	MIL	Sudanese Air Force	Antonov An-32	Surayriyah, Khartoum, Sudan		ENR				1999-06-03
50	6	44	0	†	COM	Stavropolskaya Aktsionernaya Avia Flight 1023	Antonov An-24RV	Cherkessk, Russia		ENR				1997-03-18
50	0	0	50	1*	MIL	Indian Air Force	Mikoyan MiG-27	Meerut, Uttar Pradesh, India		UNK				1990-03-21
50	4	46	0	†	COM	Philippine Airlines Flight 206	Hawker Siddeley HS 748-209 Srs.2	Mount Ugu, Benguet, Philippines		APR		BAG	19 km (10 NM)	1987-06-26
50	12	38	0	1*	COM	Varig Flight 797	Boeing 707-320C	Bingerville, Côte d'Ivoire		APR		ABJ	18 km (9.7 NM)	1987-01-03
50	5	45	0	†	COM	Balkan Bulgarian Airlines (LZ-TUR)	Tupolev Tu-134	Sofia, Bulgaria		APR		SOF	4 km (2.2 NM)	1984-01-10
50	3	47	0		COM	Spantax Flight 995	McDonnell Douglas DC-10-30	Málaga, Spain		TOF		AGP	0.45 km (0.24 NM)	1982-09-13
50	6	44	0	†	COM	Aeropesca Flight 221	Vickers Viscount 745D	Garzón, Colombia		ENR				1981-08-26
50	6	44	0	†	COM	Somali Airlines Flight 40	Fokker F27 Friendship 600	Bal'ad District, Somalia		ENR				1981-07-20
50	4	46	0	†	COM	Olympic Airways Flight 830	NAMC YS-11A-500	Servia, Greece		APR		KZI	19 km (10 NM)	1976-11-23
50	6	44	0	†	MIL	Royal Air Force (XV216)	Lockheed C-130K Hercules C.1P	Ligurian Sea, near Pisa, Italy		ENR				1971-11-09
50	6	44	0	1*	COM	Hughes Airwest Flight 706 and US Marine Corps (151458)	McDonnell Douglas DC-9-31 and McDonnell Douglas F-4 Phantom II	San Gabriel Mountains, near Duarte, California, U.S.		ENR				1971-06-06
50	5	43	2		COM	Ariana Afghan Airlines Flight 701	Boeing 727-113C	Fernhill, England, UK		APR		LGW	2.5 km (1.3 NM)	1969-01-05
50	5	45	0	†	COM	All Nippon Airways Flight 533	NAMC YS-11	Seto Inland Sea, off Matsuyama, Shikoku, Japan		APR		MYJ	<1 km (0.54 NM)	1966-11-13
50	5	45	0		COM	Iberia (EC-ATH)	Convair CV-440-62	Atlantic Ocean, off Tangier, Morocco		APR		TNG	18 km (9.7 NM)	1965-03-31
50	7	43	0	†	COM	Panair do Brasil (PP-PDE)	Lockheed L-049 Constellation	area of Manaus, Brazil		ENR				1962-12-14
50	4	46	0	†	COM	Capital Airlines Flight 20	Vickers Viscount 745D	Holdcroft, Virginia, U.S.		ENR				1960-01-18
50	5	45	0	†	COM	Scottish Airlines (G-ANSY)	Avro York	Żurrieq, Malta		ENR				1956-02-18
50	9	41	0	†	COM	Pan Am Flight 202	Boeing 377-10-26	near Santana do Araguaia, Brazil		ENR				1952-04-29
50	6	44	0	†	COM	United Air Lines Flight 615	Douglas DC-6B	Union City, California, U.S.		APR		OAK	22 km (12 NM)	1951-08-24
50	5	45	0	†	COM	United Air Lines Flight 610	Douglas DC-6	near Fort Collins, Colorado, U.S.		ENR				1951-06-30
50	3	47	0	†	COM	Pennsylvania Central Airlines Flight 410	Douglas C-54 Skymaster	Shannondale, West Virginia, U.S.		ENR				1947-06-13

== Notes regarding table data columns ==
=== Deaths ===
- Total (Tot): The total number of fatalities associated with the accident or incident.
- Crew (C): The number of crew fatalities.
- Passenger (P): The number of passenger fatalities.
- Ground (G): The number of ground (non-flying) fatalities.
- Notes (N): The presence of a cross (†) denotes that all passengers and crew were killed. The presence of a one with an asterisk (1*) indicates the accident or incident had a sole survivor.

=== Type ===
Occurrences have been coded to allow for identification and sorting by group membership (accidents and related incidents versus attacks).

==== Accidents and related incidents ====
- "COM": Commercial aircraft
- "MIL": Military aircraft

Any collision between a commercial and military aircraft is coded COM.

==== Attacks and related incidents ====
- "INB": Internal attack involving a pre-planned bomb (without hijacking).
- "INH": Internal attack to commandeer aircraft. The use of weapons (including a bomb or other explosives) for this purpose is coded in this category.
- "EXG": External attack originating on the ground (e.g., ground to air missiles, destruction of the aircraft while on the runway).
- "EXS": External attack originating in the sky (e.g., intentional downing by a military aircraft).

(Note: Categories adapted from RAND Corporation aviation research.)

=== Location ===
To provide some indication of the distance between the site and the nearest location, the following three descriptors are applied:

- none: No descriptor appears before the location name. The site was within 20 km (12.5 mi) of the location.
- "off": Used only for those aquatic crash sites within 20 km (12.5 mi) of the location.
- "near": The site was approximately 20 km to 50 km (12.5 mi to 31 mi) from the location.
- "area of": The crash site was over 50 km (31 mi) from the location provided.

The names of occurrence locations are based on their present-day names.

=== Phases of flight ===
The phases of flight are those defined by the joint Commercial Aviation Safety Team/ICAO Common Taxonomy Team.

- Standing (STD): Prior to pushback/taxi, after gate arrival, or stationary and parked.
- Taxi (TXI): Moving under own power, prior to takeoff or after landing.
- Take off (TOF): Initiation of takeoff power, pulling back on controls, through to 10 m (35 ft) altitude.
- Initial climb (ICL): End of TOF to the first of: initial prescribed power reduction, 300 m (1000 ft) altitude, or VFR pattern.
- En route (ENR): End of ICL, through cruise and descent to first of: initial approach fix (IFR) or 300 m (1000 ft) above runway elevation (VFR).
- Maneuvering (MNV): Only for low altitude flight (observation, photography) or aerobatics.
- Approach (APR): From IAF or 300 m (1000 ft) elevation to landing flare.
- Landing (LDG): Landing flare through to exit from runway.
- Unknown (UNK): Unable to determine phase of flight.

=== Airports and distance ===
Airports associated with occurrences at all phases of flight (except ENR) are represented by their three-letter IATA airport code. In some cases, no IATA code is reported/assigned in which case the four-letter ICAO code is used. In rare instances (e.g., active or decommissioned military bases or closed airports whose civil codes have been reassigned), no codes exist. These airports are represented with three asterisks "***" in place of letters. Distance from the point of impact to the airport runway is provided for occurrences during the initial climb (ICL) and approach (APR) phases. On occasion, distance is provided for occurrences during takeoff (TOF) and landing (LDG) if the aircraft impacted within the aerodrome, but not on the runway.

== See also ==
- List of accidents and incidents involving airliners by airline
- List of accidents and incidents involving airliners by location
- List of accidents and incidents involving commercial aircraft
- List of aircraft accidents and incidents by number of ground fatalities

== Notes ==
All accident and incident references to the Aviation Safety Network database are sub-pages of their main website, https://asn.flightsafety.org.
