= Nigeria Airways Flight 925 =

1969 aviation accident

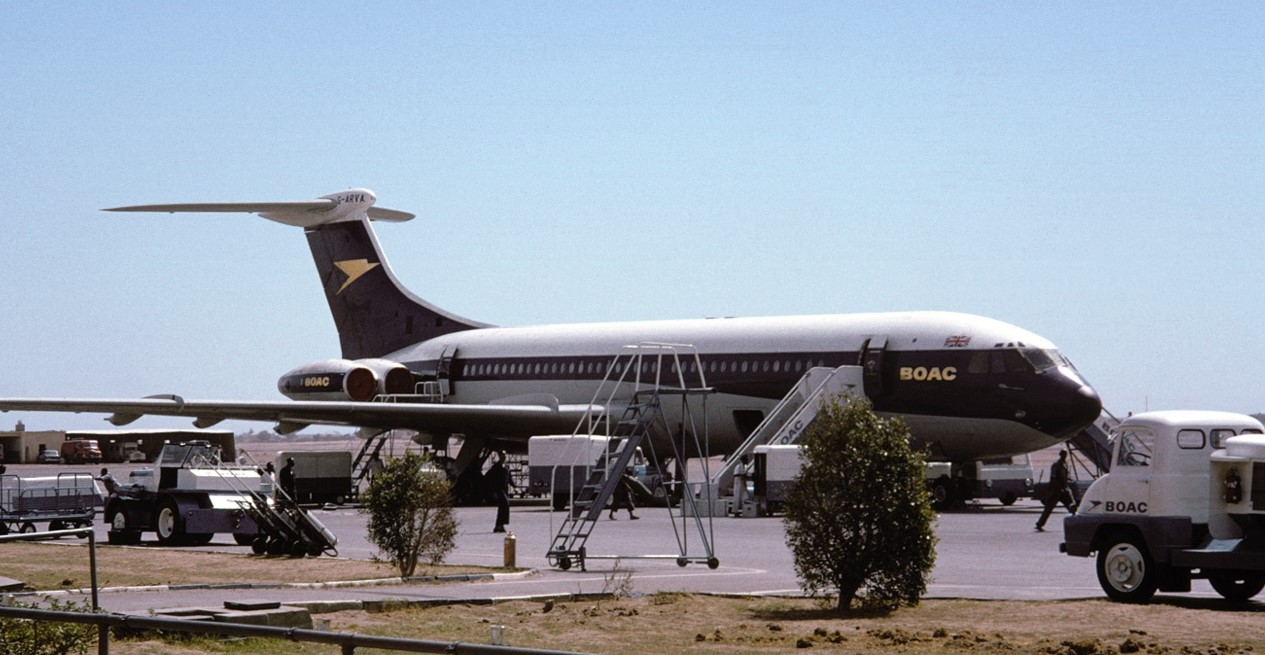
- The aircraft involved, pictured in 1966 while still in service with BOAC

Accident
- Date: 20 November 1969
- Summary: Undetermined; probable CFIT due to pilot error
- Site: 13 kilometres (8.1 mi; 7.0 nmi) N of Lagos/Ikeja International Airport (LOS)

Aircraft
- Aircraft type: Vickers VC10
- Operator: Nigeria Airways
- IATA flight No.: WT925
- ICAO flight No.: NGA925
- Call sign: NIGERIAN 925
- Registration: 5N-ABD
- Flight origin: London-Heathrow Airport
- 1st stopover: Roma-Ciampino Airport
- Last stopover: Kano International Airport, Nigeria
- Destination: Lagos/Ikeja International Airport, Nigeria
- Occupants: 87
- Passengers: 76
- Crew: 11
- Fatalities: 87
- Survivors: 0

On 20 November 1969, Nigeria Airways Flight 925, a Vickers VC10 aircraft, crashed while on approach to Lagos International Airport in Lagos, Nigeria killing all 87 people on board.

== Flight ==
Nigeria Airways Flight 925 was en route from London to Lagos with intermediate stops in Rome and Kano. It was piloted by captain Valentine Moore, 56; first officer John Wallis, 30; flight engineer George Albert Baker, 50; and navigator Basil Payton, 49. With its undercarriage down and its flaps partially extended, the VC10 struck trees 13 kilometres (8.1 mi; 7.0 nmi) short of runway 19 at Lagos. The aircraft crashed into the ground in an area of thick forest and exploded.

All 76 passengers and 11 crew on board were killed. Flight 925 was the first ever fatal crash involving the Vickers VC10 as well as the deadliest accident or incident involving the type.

== Cause ==
Immediately after the accident, three automatic weapons were found in the wreckage. To counter a rumour that a fight between a prisoner and two guards caused the crash, a ballistics expert was consulted. It was learned that none of the weapons had been recently fired.

The cause of the crash was not determined with certainty. The flight recorder was not working at the time of the crash. It was determined to be most probably due to the flight crew being unaware of the aircraft's actual altitude during the final approach and allowing the aircraft to come below safe height when not in visual contact with the ground. Fatigue may have also been a contributing factor.

== See also ==
- List of accidents and incidents involving airliners by airline
