= List of accidents and incidents involving airliners by airline =

== See also ==
- List of deadliest aircraft accidents and incidents
- List of accidents and incidents involving airliners by location
- List of accidents and incidents involving commercial aircraft
