= 1989 Soviet Air Force Caspian Sea Il-76 crash =

Aviation incident in the Soviet Union

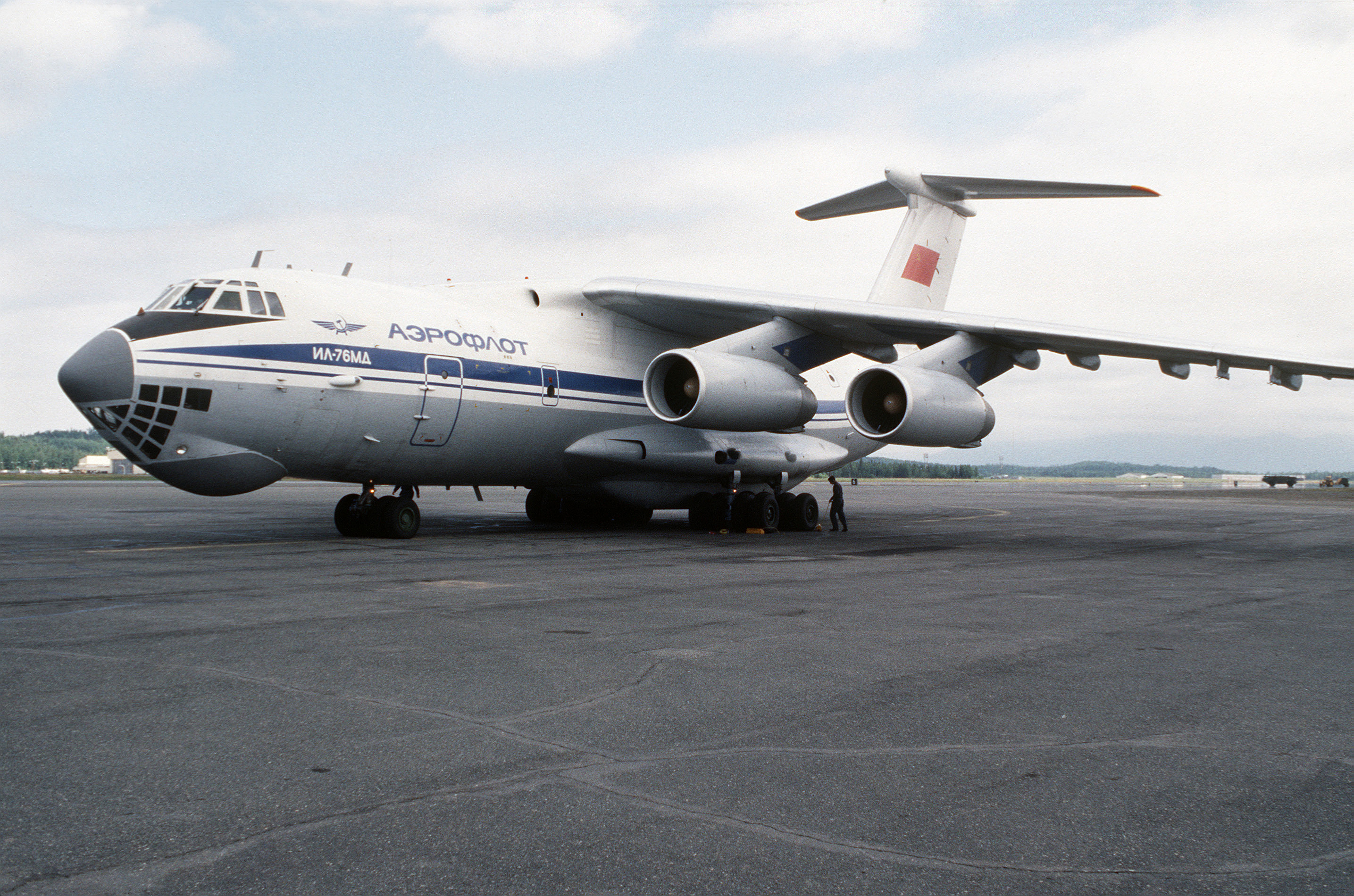
- An Ilyushin Il-76, similar to the one involved in the accident.

Accident
- Date: October 18, 1989
- Summary: Uncontained engine failure leading to structural failure
- Site: Caspian Sea, near Sumgait, Azerbaijan Soviet Socialist Republic

Aircraft
- Aircraft type: Ilyushin Il-76
- Operator: Soviet Air Forces
- Registration: CCCP-76569
- Flight origin: Nasosnaya Air Base, Azerbaijan Soviet Socialist Republic
- Destination: Zhovtneve Air Base, Bolhrad, Ukrainian Soviet Socialist Republic
- Passengers: 48
- Crew: 9
- Fatalities: 57
- Survivors: 0

On October 18, 1989, a Soviet Air Force Ilyushin Il-76, flying from Nasosnaya Air Base in SSR Azerbaijan to Zhovtneve Air Base in SSR Ukraine, crashed into the Caspian Sea. All 57 people on board were killed. The aircraft was carrying paratroopers from the 98th Guards Airborne Division. It is the deadliest aviation accident to have occurred in Azerbaijan.

== Accident ==
On 18 October 1989, a Soviet Air Force Ilyushin Il-76, with the registration CCCP-76569, carrying paratroopers from the 98th Guards Airborne Division, crashed into the Caspian Sea, killing all 57 people on board. The incident is the deadliest aviation accident in Azerbaijan history.

The flight was part of a routine training exercise taking place near the city of Sumgait, situated along the Caspian Sea coast. The aircraft, en route to carry out a training mission, faced unforeseen technical difficulties shortly after departing from Baku's Heydar Aliyev International Airport.

The crash prompted a swift response from search and rescue teams, who were able to recover the wreckage of the aircraft, along with the victims' remains, from the waters of the Caspian Sea. Investigations into the incident were subsequently launched to determine the precise causes of the crash.

== Crew ==
The flight crew consisted of:

- Captain: Alexander Nikolaevich Kalmykov (aged 41)
- First Officer: Valery Viktorovich Vologin (aged 27)
- Flight Engineer: Alexander Nikolaevich Pesterev
- Navigator: Fashaddin Zakirov
- Flight Operator Instructor: Yury Nikolaevich Gavrikov
- Air Gunner: Alexander Vladimirovich Andriyash
- Flight Engineer Instructor: Evgeny Viktorovich Andreev
- Ground Engineer: Sergei Khochuevich Gashimov
- Ground Engineer: Igor Alexandrovich Krayukhin

== Passengers (98th Guards Airborne Division) ==
- Captain of the 98th Guards, Captain: Nikolai Nikolaevich Zorev
- Constable: Ruslan Isaevich Abazov
- Constable: Vladimir Sergeevich Ananchenko
- Second Lieutenant: Yury Nikolaevich Arsyonov
- Constable: Gennady Konstantinovich Baykov
- Constable: Sergei Yurievich Baykov
- Constable: Maxim Vladimirovich Boltushkin
- First Lieutenant: Evgeny Nikolaevich Borodulin
- Constable: Oleg Nikolaeivch Vasyuchkov
- Constable: Giesidin Jamalovich Vakhidov
- Constable: Vadim Vladimirovich Vorobyov
- Corporal: Vladimir Viktorovich Gaidai
- Corporal: Ildar Mailievich Galiveev
- Second Lieutenant: Alexander Petrovich Gurov
- Constable: Yury Alexandrovich Zhukov
- Sergeant: Ildar Mazganovich Zaripov
- Corporal: Ramil Varisovich Islamgulov
- First Lieutenant: Dimitry Orestovich Kovrigin
- Constable: Igor Gennadievich Kuznetsov
- Corporal: Valery Vladimirovich Kulbitskiy
- Constable: Ruslan Yakhievich Kutluguzin
- Constable: Adhamjon Toshmirzaevich Kuchkarov
- Constable: Yury Nikolaevich Lakov
- Constable: Chingizkhan Mukharbekovich Magomadov
- Corporal: Vladimir Gavievich Machetidze
- Sergeant: Oleg Vladimirovich Merzlikin
- Sergeant Major: Nikolai Georgievich Morozov
- Constable: Stanislav Vladimirovich Morozov
- Constable: Valery Stanislavovich Mostovskiy
- Sergeant: Viktor Leonidovich Motuzka
- Constable: Mikhail Mikhailovich Pastukhov
- First Lieutenant: Sergei Vitalievich Petrov
- Constable: Pavel Alekseevich Puzikov
- Sergant: Vyacheslav Semyonovich Revenko
- Constable: Murad Rejepovich Reznik
- First Lieutenant: Igor Anatolievich Reznichenko
- Constable: Sergei Mikhailovich Ribko
- Constable: Stanislav Viktorovich Svinitskiy
- Constable: Fazliddin Saidalievich Soliev
- Constable: Igor Alekseevich Streletskiy
- Sergeant: Vladislav Nikolaevich Suslov
- Constable: Sergei Vladimirovich Terekhin
- Sergeant: Vitaly Viktorovich Trokhalev
- Constable: Alexander Yurievich Khazov
- Sergeant: Sergei Viktorovich Chugai
- Constable: Vladislav Vladimirovich Chuykin
- Sergeant: Valery Alexandrovich Shevchenko
- Corporal: Sergei Mikhailovich Yapryntsev

== Investigation ==
The cause of the accident was an engine design flaw. The inter-shaft bearing had failed, leading to the low-pressure turbine shaft fracturing from heat.

== Legacy ==
- The occupants were posthumously awarded the order "For Personal Courage".
- Monuments were built in Bolhrad, Ivanovo, Hvardiiske Dnipropetrovsk Oblast, and in Аrtsyz, Odesa Oblast.
- The Blue Berets wrote a song dedicated to the crew.
