= 1958 Sabena Douglas DC-7 crash =

1958 plane crash in Morocco

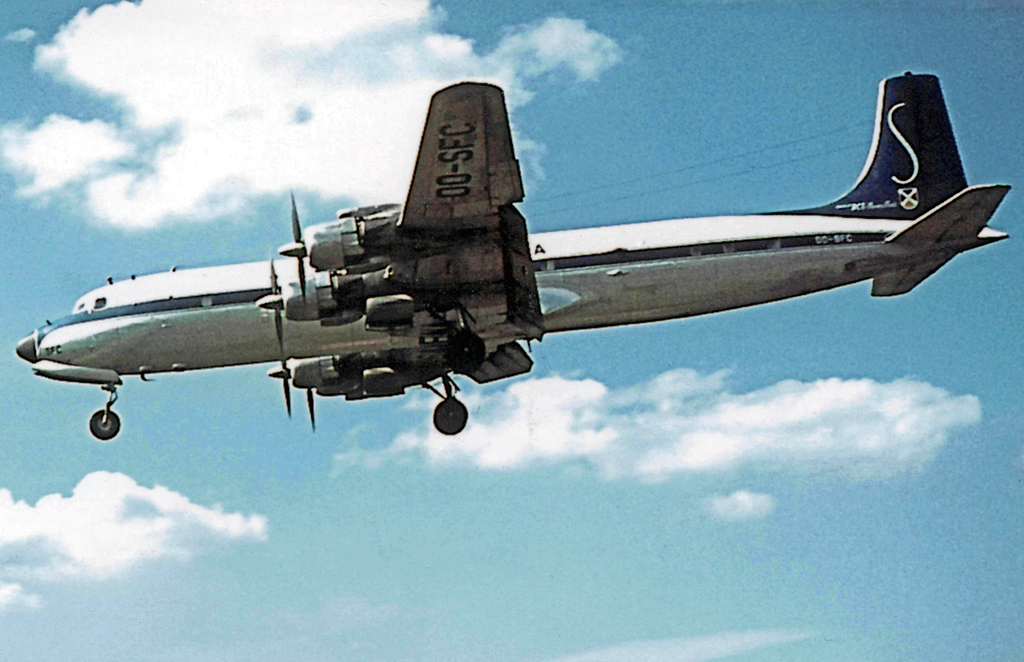
- A Sabena Douglas DC-7, similar to the aircraft involved in the accident.

Accident
- Date: 18 May 1958
- Summary: Stall during an attempted go-around due to pilot error aggravated by partial engine failure
- Site: 6 kilometres (4 mi) southwest of Casablanca, Morocco

Aircraft
- Aircraft type: Douglas DC-7C
- Operator: Sabena
- Registration: OO-SFA
- Flight origin: Brussel Airport, Belgium
- Stopover: Lisbon Airport, Portugal
- Destination: Léopoldville, Belgian Congo
- Occupants: 65
- Passengers: 56
- Crew: 9
- Fatalities: 61
- Survivors: 4

On 18 May 1958, a Sabena Douglas DC-7C crashed 6 kilometres (4 mi) southwest of Casablanca, Morocco near Casablanca-Anfa Airport, during an aborted emergency landing and attempted go-around. All 9 crew alongside 52 of the 56 passengers on board the aircraft were killed.

== Aircraft ==
The Douglas DC-7C involved was built in 1956 with serial number 45157 and registration OO-SFA and was used by the Belgian airline company Sabena until its destruction in 1958.

== Crash ==
The Sabena flight departed from Brussel Airport on 17 May 1958 at 8.50pm with 50 passengers and 9 crew members on board, and arrived for her stopover in Lisbon without issue. After the flight departed from Lisbon Airport, with an additional 6 passengers, bound for Léopoldville in the early morning of May the 18th, the crew noticed vibrations in the no. 1 engine and decided to shut the engine down. Thereafter they notified Casablanca ATC and were granted permission to divert to Casablanca-Anfa Airport in order to attempt an emergency landing. The plane lined up with runway 21 at 5.25am but failed to touch down, instead flying at a height of 5 meters (15 feet) past the runway. With the landing gear down and with full flaps, the crew applied full throtle before climbing in sharp left turn to execute a go-around in an attempt to line up with the runway again. Ultimately the plane reached a height of 25 meters (80 ft) before stalling and crashing into a hangar some 600 meters past the runway. The aircraft broke in two and caught fire following the crash, only allowing four male passengers (One swiss and three Belgians) to escape the burning wreckage through the rear emergency exit while claiming the lives of the remaining 52 passengers (including 11 children) and all 9 crew.

== Cause ==
The cause of the crash was determined to be a Stall resulting from an error of judgement by the crew in re-application of power when the aircraft was neither in the appropriate configuration nor at a sufficient speed to carry out the attempted go-around. The correct procedure the crew should have followed, would've been to apply full throttle and only gradually attaining V2 speed before retracting the landing gear and finally (at 115 knots) to retract the flaps from 50° to 20°.

== Aftermath ==
The aircraft and hangar were mostly destroyed by the impact and post-crash fire with only the tail section of the aircraft remaining recognizable. The bodies of all victims were recovered by 5pm on 18 May 1958, as well as much of the mail the aircraft was carrying. This was the deadliest crash for Sabena until the crash of Sabena Flight 548 in 1961.
