= 1996 Federal Airlines Antonov An-24 crash =

1996 aircraft crash

- The aircraft involved in the accident, photographed in 1992 while in service with Lithuanian Airlines

Accident
- Date: 3 May 1996
- Summary: Forced landing in sandstorm
- Site: near Haj Yousif

Aircraft
- Aircraft type: Antonov An-24RV
- Operator: Federal Airlines
- Registration: ST-FAG
- Flight origin: Wadi Halfa Airport, Sudan
- Destination: Khartoum International Airport, Sudan
- Occupants: 53
- Passengers: 48
- Crew: 5
- Fatalities: 53
- Survivors: 0

On 3 May 1996, a Federal Airlines An-24RV (ST-FAG) crashed into a newly built, empty house in a field 15km from Khartoum International Airport while attempting a forced landing due to critical fuel levels following nine failed approaches in a sandstorm, killing all 53 passengers and crew on board. There were zero ground fatalities. 26 of these passengers were students from Bahr el-Ghazal University.

== Aircraft ==
The aircraft was built in 1972 at the Kyiv Aviation Plant in the Soviet Union. (Note: The Bureau of Aircraft Accidents Archives erroneously lists the year of manufacture as 1966, whereas the first digit "2" in the Soviet serial number 27307909 denotes 1972, matching Aviation Safety Network records)

It first entered service with the Soviet state airline Aeroflot as CCCP-4671. Following the collapse of the Soviet Union, the aircraft was transferred to Lithuanian Airlines and re-registered as LY-AAG in the early 1990s.

In 1996, the aircraft was either sold or leased to Federal Airlines and re-registered as ST-FAG shortly before the crash.

== Accident ==
The crash occurred at 22:00 local time at night. A severe sandstorm had been reducing visibility, and the aircraft had already conducted nine go-arounds. After radioing ATC stating that they were low on fuel, they attempted to land in a nearby field, killing all 53 passengers instantly.

== Aftermath ==
On the day after the crash, Sudan's Information Minister, Brig. el-Tayeb Ibrahim Mohamed Kheir issued a statement via Egypt's Middle East News Agency attributing the crash to poor visibility due to the sandstorm and confirming all 53 occupants were Sudanese nationals. Moheideen Abdullah al-Faqeeh, a retired general serving as the manager of Federal Airlines was also on board. The crash was Sudan's second major fatal aviation disaster in just over two months, following the February 26, 1996 Sudanese Air Force Lockheed C-130 Hercules near Khartoum.
