= 1982 Nicaraguan Air Force Mil Mi-8 crash =

1982 aviation accident in Nicaragua

1982 San Andres de Bocay helicopter crash
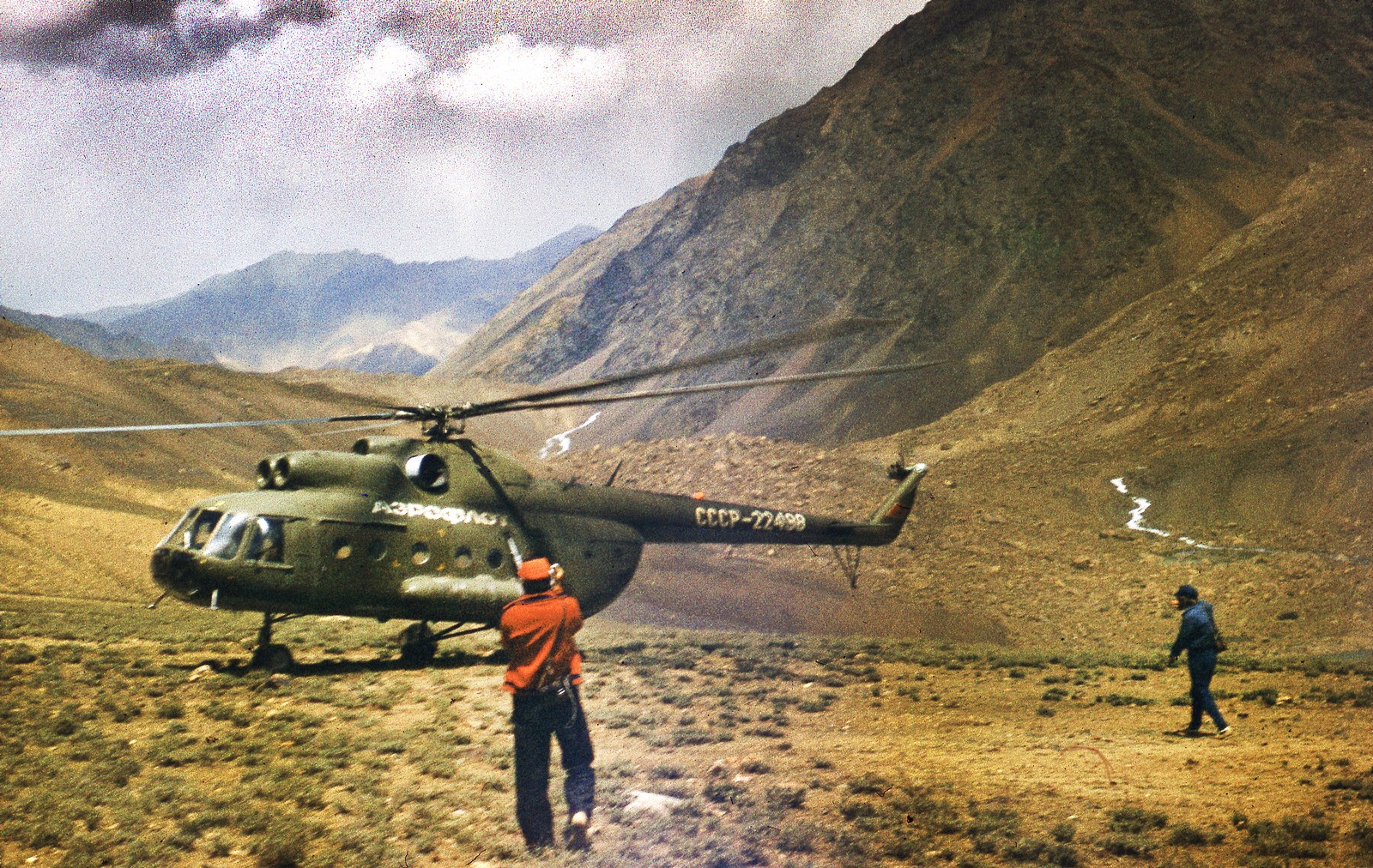
- An example of an Mil Mi-8, as involved in the accident

Accident
- Date: 9 December 1982
- Summary: Cause disputed
- Site: San Andres de Bocay area, Chinandega Department, Nicaragua

Aircraft
- Aircraft type: Mil Mi-8
- Flight origin: San Andrés Bocay
- Occupants: 92
- Passengers: 88
- Crew: 4
- Fatalities: 84
- Survivors: 8

On 9 December 1982 during the Nicaraguan Revolution, a Nicaraguan Air Force Mil Mi-8TV carrying out an emergency evacuation crashed and burned down in North Nicaragua near the border with Honduras in the San Andres de Bocay area, Chinandega Department, killing 84 people on board, including 75 young children who were being evacuated from the area. The four crew members, one woman and three other children survived the crash.

The government declared three days of mourning.

It is the deadliest crash ever to occur in Nicaraguan land and, to this day, the cause of the crash remains disputed.

== Background ==
During the 1980s, Nicaragua was experiencing ongoing conflict with Contras, anti-Sandinista forces, who were reportedly supported by external actors. Indigenous communities, including the Miskito, Sumu, and Rama peoples, were affected by these clashes along the northern border with Honduras.

The Nicaraguan government stated they protected civilians, particularly children, from the dangers posed by armed groups in the region by evacuating them. Tens of thousands of people had been displaced from the border areas during this period.

The indigenous people are generally opposed to the policies of the leftist Sandinista government of Nicaragua and report that they are being moved to other parts of Nicaragua against their will.

== Crash ==
The flight was carried out by a Soviet made Nicaraguan Air Force helicopter (Mil Mi-8) with a loading capacity of 2950kg. It was deployed to evacuate indigenous children from the Ayapal mountain areas, areas affected by repeated armed incursions and violence. On board were at 78 indigenous Miskito children between 1 and 4 years old, 10 women and four crew members.

The helicopter departed from the town of San Andres de Bocay. It crashed in a mountainous area in North Nicaragua near the border with Honduras in the San Andres de Bocay area, Chinandega Department, approximately 220 km from Managua. The helicopter caught fire upon impact, and resulted that many of people on board were burned.

Initial reports reported that crash resulted in the deaths of 75 indigenous children. Eight people survived the crash. The survivors were three children, a woman, and the four crew members. The people who survived were thrown out of the helicopter before it crashed. In the week after the accident, the total death toll rose to 84, after more bodies were found in the wreckage.

The victims were being transported from areas near the Honduran border, a region that had been designated a military zone due to ongoing conflicts with U.S.-backed rightist guerrillas.

=== Rescue mission and 2nd helicopter incident ===
One and a half hour after the accident, a second helicopter was sent to resue the survivors. However, the helicopter came under fire by automatic weapons. Therefore, the helicopter was unable to land and sustained minor damage.

== Aftermath ==
=== Cause ===
While a technical malfunction of the helicopter was not ruled out, it was assumed that the helicopter was shot down at by anti-Sandinista forces operating from Honduran territory; as supporters of the ousted dictator Somoza are operating in the border area with Honduras. According to the Nicaraguan Minister of Culture Ernesto Cardenal, the crash was "the result of the visit of American President Ronald Reagan and the Israeli Defense Minister Ariel Sharon to Honduras" and "the assistance they provide to contra-revolutionary forces".

The Nicaraguan government accused U.S.-backed rightist guerrillas of causing the crash, suggesting that the helicopter was shot down. However, leaders of the Miskito Indian council disputed this claim, attributing the crash to the helicopter's overloading, as it was carrying far more passengers than its capacity. They also criticized the government's evacuation practices, stating that children were being transported without their parents under false pretenses.

According to the Sandinistas, the helicopter was shot down by supporters of former dictator Somoza.

The helicopter was not overloaded. The helicopter was 2500kg, and did not exceed the loading capacity of 2950kg.

=== Reactions ===
Nicaraguan Minister of Culture Ernesto Cardenal responded in defense of the mission he stated that hundreds of farmers, mostly indigenous people, were being evacuated from the area because heavy fighting repeatedly occurs with heavily armed supporters of Somoza, who are crossing into Nicaragua from Honduras. Cardenal stated that the government will investigate whether it was an accident caused by a technical malfunction or whether the aircraft was shot down.

The government declared three days of mourning.

Two days after the crash, on 11 December, in the central plaza of Managua, about 50,000 people protested, condemning the United States government for the helicopter crash.

== Burials ==
The victims were buried en masse on 13 December in San Andrés Bocay, the town near the border with Honduras from which the Miskito people were evacuated.
