= List of accidents and incidents involving airliners by airline (P–Z) =

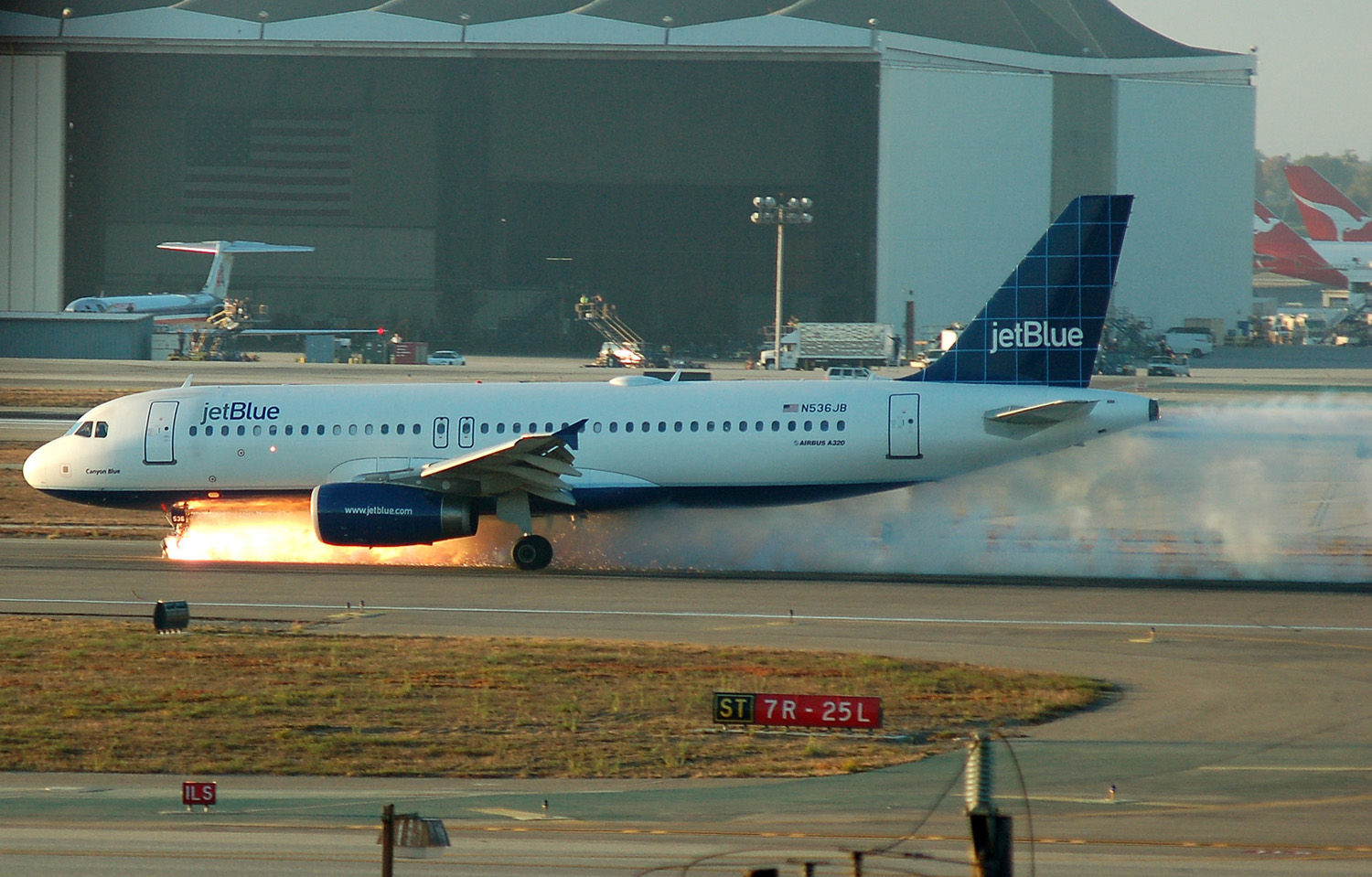
JetBlue Flight 292 making an emergency landing in September 2005 with its nose landing gear turned sideways.

This list of accidents and incidents involving airliners by airline summarizes airline accidents and all kinds of incidents, major or minor, by airline company with flight number, location, date, aircraft type, and cause.

This list is dynamic and by no means complete!

While all of the incidents in this list are noteworthy, not all the incidents listed involved fatalities.

== P ==
Pacific Air Lines
Flight designation	Location	Date	Aircraft type	Route	Cause
Flight 308	Santa Maria Airport	26 October 1959	Douglas DC-3	Santa Maria–Paso Robles	Engine failure
Flight 773	San Ramon, California	7 May 1964	Fairchild F-27A	Reno–Stockton–San Francisco	Mass murder/suicide
Pacific Air Transport
Flight designation	Location	Date	Aircraft type	Route	Cause
NC5340	Techachapi Mountains	18 November 1930	Boeing 40B-4A	Burbank–Oakland	CFIT
NC5390	La Tuna Canyon near Burbank	5 May 1931	Boeing 40B-4	San Diego–Los Angeles	Low visibility
NC10347	San Francisco Bay	16 September 1931	Boeing 40B-4	Oakland–Seattle	CFIT
NC5389	Burbank	16 May 1932	Boeing 40B-4	San Diego–Burbank–Oakland	Low visibility
NC431H; Dawson	Eugene	24 January 1933	Ford 5-AT-D Trimotor	Portland–Eugene–Medford	Engine failure, crash on takeoff
NC13345	Portland	9 November 1933	Boeing 247D	Portland–The Dalles	Poor visibility, navigation error, CFIT
Pacific Overseas Airlines
Flight designation	Location	Date	Aircraft type	Route	Cause
HS-PC103	off Sumatra Island	25 October 1948	Douglas C-47		Possibly shot down
HS-POS; City of Ayudhya	Hong Kong Island	11 March 1951	Douglas R5D-1	Hong Kong–Bangkok	Poor visibility, CFIT
Pacific Southwest Airlines
Flight designation	Location	Date	Aircraft type	Route	Cause
Flight 710	San Francisco International Airport	5 July 1972	Boeing 737-200	Sacramento–San Francisco	Hijacking
Flight 182	San Diego	25 September 1978	Boeing 727-214	Sacramento–Los Angeles–San Diego	Mid-air collision with a Cessna 172
Flight 1771; The Smile of Stockton	near Paso Robles	7 December 1987	BAe 146–200	Los Angeles–San Diego	Mass murder/suicide
Pacific Western Airlines
Flight designation	Location	Date	Aircraft type	Route	Cause
Flight 314	Cranbrook	11 February 1978	Boeing 737-200	Edmonton–Calgary–Cranbrook–Castlegar	Runway incursion, thrust reverser deployed during go-around, loss of control
Flight 501	Calgary	22 March 1984	Boeing 737-200	Calgary–Edmonton–Alberta	Uncontained engine failure, in-flight fire
Flight 117	Kelowna	14 July 1986	Boeing 737-275	Calgary–Kelowna–Vancouver	Pilot error, runway overrun
Pakistan International Airlines
Flight designation	Location	Date	Aircraft type	Route	Cause
AP-ACZ	Lash Golath Mountain	25 February 1956	Douglas C-47B	Gilgit–Islamabad	Pilot error, CFIT
AP-AJS	off Charlakhi Island	1 July 1957	Douglas C-47A	Chittagong–Dhaka	Weather, loss of control
Flight 205	Delhi-Palam Airport	15 May 1958	Convair CV-240-7	Karachi–Delhi–Karachi	Pilot error, CFIT
AP-AAH	near Lowery Pass	26 March 1965	Douglas C-47A	Peshawar–Chitral	Weather, CFIT
Flight 705	near Cairo	20 May 1965	Boeing 720-040B	Karachi–Dhahran–Cairo–Geneva–London	Excessive descent for reasons unknown
AP-ATT	near Patian	8 October 1965	Fokker F27-200	Rawalpindi–Skardu	Undetermined
AP-ALM	Islamabad	6 August 1970	Fokker F27-200	Rawalpindi–Lahore	Weather
AP-AUV	near Shamshernagar Airport	31 December 1970	Fokker F27-200		Pilot error, loss of control
Flight 631	near Jalcot	8 December 1972	Fokker F27-600	Gilgit–Rawalpindi	Weather, CFIT
Flight 740	30 mi N of Ta'if	26 November 1979	Boeing 707-340C	Kano–Jeddah–Karachi	In-flight fire for reasons unknown
Flight 326	Kabul	2 March 1981	Boeing 720-030B	Karachi–Peshawar	Hijacking
AP-AUX	near Peshawar	23 October 1986	Fokker F27-600	Lahore–Peshawar	Poor CRM, crashed short of runway
Flight 404	Himalaya Mountains (presumed)	25 August 1989	Fokker F27-200	Gilgit–Islamabad	Unexplained disappearance
Flight 268	Kathmandu	28 September 1992	Airbus A300B4-203	Karachi–Kathmandu	CFIT
Flight 544	Hyderabad Airport	25 May 1998	Fokker F27	Gwadar–Turbat–Hyderabad	Hijacking
Flight 688	near Multan International Airport	10 July 2006	Fokker F27-200	Multan–Lahore	Improper maintenance, engine failure, crew errors
Flight 756	near Peshawar	24 June 2014	Airbus A310-324ET	Riyadh–Peshawar	Struck by ground fire
Flight 661	near Havelian	7 December 2016	ATR 42-500	Chitral–Islamabad	Improper maintenance, propeller failure, loss of control
Flight 8303	near Karachi	22 May 2020	Airbus A320-214	Lahore–Karachi	Under investigation
Palair Macedonian Airlines
Flight designation	Location	Date	Aircraft type	Route	Cause
Flight 301	near Skopje	5 March 1993	Fokker 100	Skopje–Zurich	Wing icing, loss of control
Panair do Brasil
Flight designation	Location	Date	Aircraft type	Route	Cause
PP-PBD	Serra de Cantareira	18 August 1941	Lockheed 18-10 Lodestar	Porto Alegre–São Paulo	CFIT
PP-PBH	Rio Doce, Brazil	21 September 1944	Lockheed 18-10 Lodestar	Rio de Janeiro–Belém	Engine failure
PP-PBN	São Paulo de Olivença	3 January 1947	Sikorsky S-43B	Iquitos–Manaus	CFIT
Flight 99	near Gravataí Air Base	28 July 1950	Lockheed L-049 Constellation	Rio de Janeiro–Porto Alegre	Weather, CFIT
Flight 389	Uberlândia, Brazil	28 February 1952	Douglas DC-3A-393	Goiânia–Uberlândia–Rio de Janeiro	Pilot error, CFIT
Flight 263	near Congonhas Airport	17 June 1953	Lockheed L-049 Constellation	Rio de Janeiro–São Paulo	Bad visibility, crew error
Flight 263	near Silvio Pettirossi Int'l Airport	16 June 1955	Lockheed L-149 Constellation	London–Paris–Lisbon–Dakar–Recife–Rio de Janeiro–São Paulo–Ascunción–Buenos Aires	Pilot error, CFIT
PP-PDO	near Guararapes Int'l Airport	1 November 1961	Douglas DC-7C	Lisbon–Ilha do Sal–Recife	Pilot error, CFIT
Flight 026	Galeão Int'l Airport	20 August 1962	Douglas DC-8-33	Buenos Aires–Rio de Janeiro	Aborted takeoff, ran off runway
PP-PDE; Estêvão Ribeiro Baião Parente	near Paraná da Eva	14 December 1962	Lockheed L-049 Constellation	Belém–Manaus	CFIT for reasons unknown
Pan American-Grace Airways (Panagra)
Flight designation	Location	Date	Aircraft type	Route	Cause
Unknown	Arequipa Airport	21 February 1931	Ford Trimotor		Hijacking
NC403H; San José	near Vitacura	16 July 1932	Ford 5-AT-C Trimotor	Santiago–Mendoza	Weather, CFIT
NC407H	Lima Airport	22 March 1934	Ford 5-AT-C Trimotor		Engine failure, crashed on takeoff
NC8417; San Pedro	Mar Chiquita Lake	11 June 1934	Ford 5-AT-C Trimotor	Buenos Aires–Santiago	Weather, CFIT
NC433H; San Felipe	Lima, Peru	24 December 1935	Ford 5-AT-D Trimotor	None	CFIT
NC14273	near San José Pinula	10 October 1936	Douglas DC-2-118B	San Salvador–Guatemala City	CFIT
NC15065	off Cristobal	2 August 1937	Sikorsky S-43B	Guayaquil–Tumaco–Cali–Cristobal	Engine failure or weather
NC14272; Santa Lucia	Mount Mercedario	19 July 1938	Douglas DC-2-118A		CFIT
Flight 9	northeast of Chaparra, Peru	22 January 1943	Douglas DC-3A-399	Santiago–Arequipa–Lima	Pilot error, CFIT
NC19470	off Chorrillos	4 January 1945	Douglas DC-3A		Aircraft stolen, CFIT
Pan American World Airways (Pan Am)
Paninternational
Flight designation	Location	Date	Aircraft type	Route	Cause
Flight 112	A7/E45 near Hamburg Airport	6 September 1971	BAC 1-11-515FB	Hanover–Hamburg–Málaga	Maintenance error, double engine failure
Partnair
Flight designation	Location	Date	Aircraft type	Route	Cause
Flight 394	Hirtshals, Denmark	8 September 1989	Convair 580	Oslo–Hamburg	Structural failure, counterfeit parts
Pegasus Airlines
Flight designation	Location	Date	Aircraft type	Route	Cause
Flight 2193; Açelya	Istanbul Sabiha Gökçen International Airport	5 February 2020	Boeing 737-86J	Izmir–Istanbul	Under investigation (runway overrun on landing)
Pennsylvania Central Airlines (PCA)
Flight designation	Location	Date	Aircraft type	Route	Cause
Trip 19	Lovettsville, Virginia	31 August 1940	Douglas DC-3-313	Washington, DC–Pittsburgh–Detroit	Lightning strike (probable), loss of control
NC21788 (operating for USAAF)	Atlantic Ocean, off Lake Worth, Florida	5 May 1944	Douglas C-49H	Miami–Savannah	Mid-air collision with a USAAF B-24
Flight 142	Cheat Mountain, near Morgantown, West Virginia	14 April 1945	Douglas DC-3-313A	Pittsburgh–Morgantown	Pilot error, CFIT
Flight 105	Birmingham Airport	6 January 1946	Douglas DC-3-392	New York City–Pittsburgh–Knoxville–Birmingham	Pilot error, runway excursion on landing
Flight 410	Lookout Rock, Blue Ridge Mountains	13 June 1947	Douglas C-54	Chicago–Cleveland–Pittsburgh–Washington, DC–Norfolk	Pilot error, CFIT
Petropavlovsk-Kamchatsky Air Enterprise
Flight designation	Location	Date	Aircraft type	Route	Cause
RA-87481	Tigil, Russia	23 September 2001	Yakovlev Yak-40		Under investigation (heavy landing, nosegear failure)
Flight 123	Ust-Kamchatsk Airport	16 April 2011	Yakovlev Yak-40K	Ust Kamchatsk–Petropavlovsk Kamchatsky	Under investigation (runway excursion)
Flight 251	near Palana	12 September 2012	Antonov An-28	Petropavlovsk Kamchatsky–Palana	Pilot intoxication, pilot error, CFIT
Flight 251	near Palana	6 July 2021	Antonov An-26	Petropavlovsk Kamchatsky–Palana	Under investigation (CFIT)
Philippine Airlines
Piedmont Airlines
Flight designation	Location	Date	Aircraft type	Route	Cause
Flight 349; Buckeye Pacemaker	Bucks Elbow Mountain, near Crozet, Virginia	30 October 1959	Douglas DC-3	Washington, DC–Charlottesville	Pilot error, CFIT
Flight 22; Manhattan Pacemaker	over Hendersonville, North Carolina	19 July 1967	Boeing 727-22	Asheville–Roanoke	Mid-air collision with a Cessna 310
PMTair
Flight designation	Location	Date	Aircraft type	Route	Cause
XU-072 (operated by Royal Phnom Penh Airways)	Ratanakiri Airport	21 November 2005	Xian Y-7-100C	Phnom Penh–Ratanakiri	Crashed on landing
Flight 241	Kampot Province	25 June 2007	Antonov An-24B	Siem Reap–Sihanoukville	CFIT for reasons unknown
Polar Airlines
Flight designation	Location	Date	Aircraft type	Route	Cause
RA-05881	near Sangar	16 May 2003	Antonov An-3T		Under investigation (engine failure, forced landing)
RA-02252	Sangar	18 November 2005	Antonov An-2TP	Sangar–Sebyan–Kyuel	Weather, loss of control
RA-26061	Deputatskiy Airport	21 November 2012	Antonov An-26B-100	Yakutsk–Deputatskiy	Under investigation (runway excursion)
Flight 9977	Vilyuisk Airport	16 August 2013	Antonov An-2TP	Vilyuisk–Ugulet	Engine problems for reasons unknown, forced landing
Polyarnya Aviatsiya
Flight designation	Location	Date	Aircraft type	Route	Cause
Unknown	Dudinka	25 December 1945	Douglas C-47		In-flight fire, crash on takeoff
CCCP-N400	Kara Sea	13 December 1946	Focke-Wulf Fw 200C-3	Igarka–Arkangelsk	Double engine failure, forced landing
CCCP-N444	89 mi N of Kharp, Russia	7 March 1948	Lisunov Li-2	Dudinka–Anderma	CFIT
CCCP-N464	off Cape Medynski Zavorot	16 September 1948	Lisunov Li-2T	None	Weather, spatial disorientation, fuel exhaustion, water ditching
CCCP-N494	10 mi east of Mys Kosistyy	1 November 1948	Lisunov Li-2	Kresty Kolymskiye–Ust-Yansk–Mys Kosistyy	Engine failure, icing, stall, loss of control
CCCP-N500	Yakutsk Airport	23 April 1950	Focke-Wulf MK-200		Runway overrun
CCCP-N488	Khimki Reservoir	26 June 1950	Consolidated KM-2		Pilot error
CCCP-N568	Lena River near Yakutsk	20 August 1951	Antonov An-2		Maintenance error, crash on takeoff
CCCP-N591	Ust-Tareya	28 September 1952	Antonov An-2		Pilot error, stall, loss of control
CCCP-N479	near Kępino	4 March 1955	Ilyushin Il-12	Mys-Kamennyy–Amderma–Arkhangelsk–Moscow	Engine fire, forced landing
Flight 3	41 mi from Katanga	30 December 1958	Ilyushin Il-14M	Pevek–Mys Kosistyy–Khatanga–Moscow	Deviation from course, premature descent, CFIT
Precision Air
Flight designation	Location	Date	Aircraft type	Route	Cause
Flight 494; Bukoba	Lake Victoria near Bukoba	6 November 2022	ATR 42-500	Dar es Salaam–Mwanza–Bukoba	Under investigation
President Airlines
Flight designation	Location	Date	Aircraft type	Route	Cause
N90773; Theodore Roosevelt	River Shannon	10 September 1961	Douglas DC-6	Düsseldorf–Shannon–Gander–Chicago	Instrument failure, weather, possible pilot error, loss of control
Puerto Rico International Airlines (Prinair)
Flight designation	Location	Date	Aircraft type	Route	Cause
Flight 277	Luquillo, Puerto Rico	5 March 1969	de Havilland Heron 2D	Charlotte Amalie-San Juan	ATC error, CFIT
Flight 191	Ponce, Puerto Rico	24 June 1972	de Havilland Heron 2	San Juan-Ponce	Pilot error
Flight 610	Alexander Hamilton Airport	24 July 1979	de Havilland Heron 2D	St. Croix-St. Kitts	Overloading, loss of control
Pulkovo Aviation Enterprise
Flight designation	Location	Date	Aircraft type	Route	Cause
Flight 9045	near Nalchik Airport	24 February 1994	Antonov An-12BP	Volgograd-Nalchik	Icing, stall, loss of control
RA-86060	near Sheremetyevo Airport	28 July 2002	Ilyushin Il-86	Moscow-Saint Petersburg	Mechanical failure, loss of control
Flight 612	near Donetsk	22 August 2006	Tupolev Tu-154M	Anapa-Saint Petersburg	Weather, stall, loss of control

== Q ==
Qantas
Flight designation	Location	Date	Aircraft type	Route	Cause
G-AUED	Tambo	24 March 1927	de Havilland DH-9C	Charleville–Tambo–Blackall	Engine failure
G-AUHI	Adelaide Hills	4 September 1928	de Havilland DH.50J	Adelaide–Longreach	Weather, loss of control
VH-UHE; Atalanta	near Winton	3 October 1934	de Havilland DH.50A		Loss of control, possible stall
VH-USG; Adelaide	Longreach	15 November 1934	de Havilland Express	London–Singapore–Darwin–Longreach–Brisbane–Sydney	Loss of control due to design defect
G-AEUH	Timor Sea off Kupang	30 January 1942	Short Empire		Shot down
VH-USE	Brisbane	20 February 1942	de Havilland Express	Brisbane–Mount Isa–Darwin	Unexplained tailfin failure, loss of control
VH-ADU; Camilla	Port Moresby	22 April 1943	Short Empire	Townsville–Port Moresby	Broke apart after landing
VH-CAB (operated for RAAF)	Port Moresby	26 November 1943	Lockheed C-56B Lodestar	Port Moresby–Townsville	Poor visibility, CFIT
VH-ABB	Sydney	11 October 1944	Short Empire	Sydney–Townsville	Pilot error, stall, loss of control
VH-EBQ	Lae	16 July 1951	de Havilland Australia DHA-3 Drover	Wau–Bulolo–Lae	Propeller failure, engine separation, loss of control
Flight 1	Bangkok	23 September 1999	Boeing 747-438	Sydney–Bangkok	Weather, crew error
Flight 1737	Over Bass Strait, Australia	29 May 2003	Boeing 717-231	Melbourne–Launceston	Hijacking
Flight 30	South China Sea	25 July 2008	Boeing 747-438	Hong Kong–Melbourne	Mid-air explosion, mid-air decompression
Flight 72	Near Exmouth, Western Australia	7 October 2008	Airbus A330-303	Singapore–Perth	Air data inertial reference unit failure and autopilot software design error
Flight 32	Between Singapore and Batam	4 November 2010	Airbus A380-842	Singapore–Sydney	Uncontained engine failure

== R ==
RED Air
Flight designation	Location	Date	Aircraft type	Route	Cause
Flight 203	Miami International Airport	21 June 2022	McDonnell Douglas MD-82	Santo Domingo–Miami	Under investigation (runway excursion)
Red Wings Airlines
Flight designation	Location	Date	Aircraft type	Route	Cause
Flight 9268	M3 near Vnukovo Airport	29 December 2012	Tupolev Tu-204-100V	Pardubice–Moscow	Brake failure, pilot error, runway overrun
Rocky Mountain Airways
Flight designation	Location	Date	Aircraft type	Route	Cause
Flight 10	Near Aspen/Pitkin County Airport	22 January 1970	Aero Commander 580	Denver–Aspen	CFIT, pilot error, inhibited visibility
Flight 217	Buffalo Pass	4 December 1978	de Havilland DHC-6 Twin Otter	Steamboat Springs–Denver	Icing, mountain waves, pilot error
Royal Air Maroc (RAM)
Flight designation	Location	Date	Aircraft type	Route	Cause
Flight 630	Atlas Mountains	21 August 1994	ATR-42-312	Agadir–Casablanca	Deliberate crash (by pilot)
Royal Nepal Airlines (now Nepal Airlines)
Flight designation	Location	Date	Aircraft type	Route	Cause
9N-AAH	Tulachan Dhuri, Nepal	1 August 1962	Douglas C-47	Kathmandu–New Delhi	CFIT
9N-AAP	Hetauda, Makwanpur District	12 July 1969	Douglas DC-3	Kathmandu–Simara (now Jitpur Simara)	CFIT
RusAir (now AtlasJet)
Flight designation	Location	Date	Aircraft type	Route	Cause
Flight 9605	A133 near Besovets	20 June 2011	Tupolev Tu-134A-3	Moscow–Petrozavodsk	Crew failed to go-around, premature descent, CFIT
Ryanair
Flight designation	Location	Date	Aircraft type	Route	Cause
Flight 296	London Stansted Airport	27 February 2002	Boeing 737-8AS		Ground fire
Flight 4102	Rome	10 November 2008	Boeing 737-8AS	Frankfurt–Rome	Multiple birdstrikes

== S ==
S7 Airlines
Flight designation	Location	Date	Aircraft type	Route	Cause
Flight 778	Irkutsk	8 July 2006	Airbus A310-324	Moscow–Irkutsk	Pilot error
Sabena
Flight designation	Location	Date	Aircraft type	Route	Cause
OO-AGN	Tatsfield, Surrey	10 December 1935	Savoia-Marchetti S.73P	Brussels–London	Pilot error
OO-AUB	Ostend, Belgium	16 November 1937	Junkers Ju 52/3mge	Frankfurt–Cologne–Brussels–London	Weather, pilot error
OO-AGT	Soest, Germany	10 October 1938	Savoia-Marchetti S.73P	Brussels–Düsseldorf–Berlin	In-flight breakup
OO-AGS (operating for RAF)	Arques, France	23 May 1940	Savoia-Marchetti S.73P	Brussels–London	Shot down
OO-AGZ (operated by RAF)	Merville, France	23 May 1940	Savoia-Marchetti S.73P		Destroyed on the ground
OO-AUI (operated by RAF)	near Arques, France	23 May 1940	Douglas DC-3-227B	Merville-London	Shot down by ground fire, forced landing
OO-AUR	Haren Airport	17 September 1946	Douglas C-47A	Brussels–London	Loss of speed for reasons unknown
OO-CBG	near Gander	18 September 1946	Douglas DC-4-1009	Brussels–Shannon–Gander–New York City	Pilot error
OO-CAR	near Mitwaba, Belgian Congo	24 December 1947	Lockheed C-60A	Mitwaba–Manono	Double engine failure, loss of control
OO-AWH	Heathrow Airport	2 March 1948	Douglas DC-3D	Brussels–London	Pilot error
OO-CBE	near Magazini, Belgian Congo	12 May 1948	Douglas DC-4-1009	Johannesburg–Léopoldville–Libenga–Brussels	Flew into a tornado, windshear
OO-CBL	near Kimbwe, Belgian Congo	31 August 1948	Douglas C-47A	Manono–Elizabethville	Undetermined
OO-CBK	Léopoldville, Belgian Congo	27 August 1949	Douglas C-47B	Léopoldville–Elizabethville	Loss of engine power, failed to gain height on takeoff
OO-AUQ	Aulnay-sous-Bois, France	18 December 1949	Douglas C-47A	Paris–Brussels	Wing separation, loss of control
OO-CBA	near Gao Airport	24 July 1951	Douglas DC-3-455	Brussels–Gao–Léopoldville	Engine failure on takeoff
Flight 425	near Kikwit, Belgian Congo	4 February 1952	Douglas C-47A	Costermansville-Léopoldville	Propeller separation, fuselage penetration, loss of control
OO-AWQ	near Frankfurt	14 October 1953	Convair CV-240-12	Frankfurt–Brussels	Loss of power on takeoff
OO-AWO	near Kloten Airport	19 December 1953	Convair CV-240-12	Brussels–Zürich	Pilot error
OO-CBY	near Maribor, Yugoslavia	3 June 1954	Douglas C-47A	Blackbushe-Beograd	Attacked by MiG-15 fighter, forced landing
Flight 503	Mount Terminillo	13 February 1955	Douglas DC-6	Brussels–Rome	Navigation error, CFIT
OO-SFA	near Casablanca	18 May 1958	Douglas DC-7C	Brussels–Lisbon–Léopoldville	Engine failure, pilot error
Flight 548	Brussels	15 February 1961	Boeing 707-329	New York City–Brussels	Mechanical failure
Flight 712	near Lagos	13 July 1968	Boeing 707-329C	Brussels–Lagos	Excessive descent for reasons unknown
Flight 571	Lod International Airport	8 May 1972	Boeing 707-329	Vienna-Tel Aviv	Hijacking
SAHSA
Flight designation	Location	Date	Aircraft type	Route	Cause
Flight 414	Tegucigalpa	21 October 1989	Boeing 727		Pilot error
Saratov Airlines
Flight designation	Location	Date	Aircraft type	Route	Cause
Flight 703	near Stepanovskoye, Moscow Oblast	11 February 2018	Antonov An-148-100B	Moscow–Orsk	Pilot error, icing, loss of control
Saturn Airways
Flight designation	Location	Date	Aircraft type	Route	Cause
N640NA	near San Antonio International Airport	31 January 1967	Douglas DC-6A		Undetermined
N9248R	near Fort Dix	10 October 1970	Lockheed L-100-20 Hercules	Dayton–Wrightstown	Weather, spatial disorientation, pilot error
Flight 14	near Springfield, Illinois	23 May 1974	Lockheed L-100-30 Hercules	Alameda–Indianapolis–Wilmington	Metal fatigue, wing separation, loss of control
Saudia
Flight designation	Location	Date	Aircraft type	Route	Cause
HZ-AAF	Jeddah	25 September 1959	Douglas C-54A	Jeddah–Riyadh	Pilot error, stall, forced landing
HZ-AAN	Red Sea, 63 mi off Jeddah	13 June 1964	Douglas C-47A	None	CFIT
HZ-AAM	near Khalif Nseir	24 June 1967	Douglas C-47	Nejran-Jeddah	?
HZ-AAZ	3 mi S of Dhahran	8 July 1968	Convair CV-340-68	Bahrain–Dhahran	Poor visibility, aborted approach
Unknown	Damascus	10 November 1970	Douglas DC-3	Amman–Riyadh	Hijacking
Flight 163	Riyadh	19 August 1980	Lockheed L-1011-200 TriStar	Karachi–Riyadh–Jeddah	In-flight fire for reasons unknown, burned out on the ground
Flight 162	over Qatar	22 December 1980	Lockheed L-1011-200 TriStar	Dhahran–Karachi	Explosive decompression
Flight 763	Delhi	12 November 1996	Boeing 747-168B	Delhi–Dhahran	Mid-air collision with a Kazakhstan Airlines Ilyushin Il-76
Flight 770	Tambaram Air Force Station	2 June 1997	Boeing 747	Dhahran–Riyadh–Chennai	Pilot error, landed at wrong airport
Flight 3830	Kuala Lumpur International Airport	23 August 2001	Boeing 747-368	Kuala Lumpur-Jeddah	Hydraulic system failure, ran off runway
Flight 810 (leased from Air Atlanta Icelandic)	Zia International Airport	25 March 2008	Boeing 747-357	Madinah–Dhaka	Fuel leak, in-flight fire
Flight 931 (leased from Air ACT)	Frankfurt International Airport	16 September 2018	Boeing 747-428FER	Dammam–Frankfurt	Fatigue, wing flap fell off on landing
Flight 919 (operated by Air ACT)	King Fahad International Airport	1 February 2020	Boeing 747-412F (SCD)	Dammam–Zaragoza	Tailstrike on takeoff
Saudia Cargo
Flight designation	Location	Date	Aircraft type	Route	Cause
Flight 916 (operated by Air ACT)	Aachen Airport	11 November 2017	Boeing 747-428FER	Maastricht–Jeddah	Runway excursion on takeoff
Scandinavian Airlines System (SAS)
Seaboard World Airlines
Flight 253A	Burevestnik, Kuril Islands	1 July 1968	Douglas DC-8-63CF	Seattle–Yokota AB	Forced landing
N6834	Stockton Airport	16 October 1969	Douglas DC-8-63CF	None	Mechanical failure, runway overrun
Société Générale des Transports Aériens (SGTA)
Flight designation	Location	Date	Aircraft type	Route	Cause
F-ADTP	near Schiphol Airport	24 August 1924	Farman F.61 Goliath		Engine failure, forced landing
F-ADTN	Atlantic Ocean	5 May 1927	Farman F.61 Goliath		Unexplained disappearance
F-AEIE	Cologne Butzweilerhof Airport	23 May 1928	Farman F.63bis Goliath		Crashed on takeoff
F-ADTQ	Aalsmeer, Netherlands	9 July 1930	Farman F.63bis Goliath	Amsterdam–Rotterdam–Antwerp–Brussels–Paris	Mechanical failure, loss of control
Shanxi Airlines
Flight designation	Location	Date	Aircraft type	Route	Cause
B-4218	Linfen	7 October 1988	Ilyushin Il-14P	None	Crash on takeoff
Siberia Airlines (now S7 Airlines)
Flight designation	Location	Date	Aircraft type	Route	Cause
Flight 1812	Black Sea	4 October 2001	Tupolev Tu-154M	Tel Aviv–Novosibirsk	Accidental shoot down
Flight 852	Omsk Airport	14 January 2002	Tupolev Tu-204-100	Frankfurt–Novosibirsk	Double engine failure, skidded off runway
Flight 1047	Rostov Oblast	24 August 2004	Tupolev Tu-154B-2	Moscow–Sochi	Terrorist bombing
Sichuan Airlines
Flight designation	Location	Date	Aircraft type	Route	Cause
Flight 434	near Chengdu	24 January 2003	Embraer ERJ-145LR	Chongqing–Chengdu	Attempted hijacking
Flight 8633	over Xiaojin County	14 May 2018	Airbus A319-100	Chongqing–Lhasa	Windshield failure, uncontrolled decompression
SilkAir
Flight designation	Location	Date	Aircraft type	Route	Cause
Flight 185	Palembang	19 December 1997	Boeing 737-300	Jakarta–Singapore	Deliberate crash (disputed)
Singapore Airlines
Flight designation	Location	Date	Aircraft type	Route	Cause
Flight 117	Singapore	26 March 1991	Airbus A310	Kuala Lumpur–Singapore	Hijacking
Flight 006	Taipei	31 October 2000	Boeing 747-412	Singapore–Taipei–Los Angeles	Ground collision
Flight 368	Changi Airport	27 June 2016	Boeing 777-312ER	Singapore-Milan	Oil leak, in-flight fire
9V-SQK	Changi Airport	29 November 2017	Boeing 777-212ER	None	Contact with burning ground vehicle
Skyways
Flight designation	Location	Date	Aircraft type	Route	Cause
G-AJPL	near Castel Benito Airport	4 February 1949	Douglas C-54A	Nairobi–Khartoum–Tripoli–London	Fuel exhaustion, double engine failure, loss of altitude
G-AHFI	near Gatow	15 March 1949	Avro York I	Northolt–Berlin	Loss of control
G-AHFA	North Atlantic	2 February 1953	Avro York I	London–Azores–Gander–Kingston	Unexplained disappearance
G-AGNY	Kyritz	26 June 1954	Avro York C.I	Hamburg–Berlin	Engine separation, loss of control for reasons unknown
G-ALDV	Meesden Green	1 April 1958	Handley Page Hermes 4/A	None	Jammed elevator, loss of control
Slick Airways
Flight designation	Location	Date	Aircraft type	Route	Cause
NC59486	Denver	14 February 1947	Curtiss C-46E	Chicago–Omaha–Denver	Loss of control
NC59488	Hanksville, Utah	21 August 1947	Curtiss C-46E	Denver–Los Angeles	Weather, CFIT
NC56489	near Port Columbus International Airport	16 May 1948	Curtiss C-46E	Newark–Chicago–Denver–Burbank–San Francisco	Turbulence, rudder failure, loss of control
Flight 11-8	near Cheyenne Regional Airport	9 October 1949	Curtiss C-46E	Las Vegas–Denver	Turbulence, icing, loss of control
Flight 162-3	near Bradley Field	4 March 1953	Curtiss C-46F	New York–Windsor Locks–Chicago	Pilot error, CFIT
Flight 40Z	San Francisco International Airport	3 February 1963	Lockheed L-1049H Super Constellation	Albuquerque–San Francisco	Pilot error
Flight 12	near Logan International Airport	10 March 1964	Douglas DC-4	New York–Windsor Locks–Boston	Icing, loss of control
South African Airways (SAA)
Flight designation	Location	Date	Aircraft type	Route	Cause
ZS-AKY	Rand Airport	16 June 1937	Junkers Ju 52/3msa1		Loss of power, crash on takeoff
ZS-AST	Elands Bay, South Africa	28 March 1941	Lockheed 18-08-01 Lodestar	Windhoek–Cape Town	CFIT
ZS-AVJ	Mount Ingeli	15 October 1951	Douglas C-47A	Port Elizabeth–Durban	CFIT
Flight 201 (Yoke Yoke, operated by BOAC)	Mediterranean Sea off San Lucido	8 April 1954	de Havilland Comet 1	London-Rome-Cairo-Johannesburg	Metal fatigue, structural failure
Flight 512	near Seymour	6 March 1962	Douglas DC-3	Cape Town–Collondale	Pilot error, CFIT
Flight 406; Rietbok	East London, South Africa	13 March 1967	Vickers Viscount 818	Port Elizabeth–East London–Bloemfontein-Johannesburg	Unknown (possible pilot incapacitation and loss of control)
Flight 228; Pretoria	Windhoek	20 April 1968	Boeing 707-344C	Johannesburg–Windhoek–Luanda–Las Palmas–Frankfurt–London	Pilot error, CFIT
Flight 295; Helderberg	Indian Ocean, near Mauritius	28 November 1987	Boeing 747-244B Combi	Taipei–Mauritius–Johannesburg	In-flight fire, in-flight breakup, loss of control
South Airlines
Flight designation	Location	Date	Aircraft type	Route	Cause
Flight 8971	Donetsk Airport	13 February 2013	Antonov An-24RV	Odesa–Donetsk	Poor visibility, pilot error, loss of control
Southeast Airlines
Flight designation	Location	Date	Aircraft type	Route	Cause
Flight 308	Holston Mountain	8 January 1959	Douglas DC-3A	Knoxville–Bristol	Pilot error, CFIT
Southern Airways
Flight designation	Location	Date	Aircraft type	Route	Cause
Flight 932	Huntington, West Virginia	14 November 1970	Douglas DC-9-31	Kinston–Huntington	Unexplained descent, CFIT
Flight 242	New Hope, Georgia	4 April 1977	Douglas DC-9-31	Muscle Shoals–Huntsville–Atlanta	Water ingestion, double engine failure
Southwest Airlines
Flight designation	Location	Date	Aircraft type	Route	Cause
Flight 1455	Burbank, California	5 March 2000	Boeing 737-3T5	Las Vegas–Burbank	Pilot error, runway overrun
Flight 2066	Amarillo International Airport	24 May 2003	Boeing 737-3H4	Las Vegas–Amarillo	Crew error, weather, runway excursion
Flight 1248	Chicago	8 December 2005	Boeing 737-7H4	Baltimore–Chicago	Weather, runway overrun, ground collision
Flight 2294	near Charleston, West Virginia	13 July 2009	Boeing 737-3H4	Nashville–Baltimore	Metal fatigue, structural failure, rapid depressurization
Flight 812	Yuma International Airport	1 April 2011	Boeing 737-3H4	Phoenix–Sacramento	Metal fatigue, structural failure, rapid depressurization
Flight 345	La Guardia Airport	22 July 2013	Boeing 737-7H4	Nashville–New York City	Pilot error, landed nose-first, nosegear failure
Flight 149	BWI Marshall Airport	4 August 2016	Boeing 737-3H4	Baltimore–Atlanta	Nosegear failure (during pushback)
Flight 3472	Gulf of Mexico	27 August 2016	Boeing 737-7H4	New Orleans–Orlando	Uncontained engine failure, fuselage penetration
Flight 1380	near Philadelphia	17 April 2018	Boeing 737-7H4	New York City–Dallas	Uncontained engine failure, fuselage penetration, explosive decompression
Flight 1392	Austin–Bergstrom International Airport	7 May 2020	Boeing 737-7H4	Denver–Austin	Collision with pedestrian on runway
Southwest Airways
Flight designation	Location	Date	Aircraft type	Route	Cause
Flight 7	Refugio Pass, CA	6 April 1951	Douglas DC-3	Santa Maria Airport (CA)–Santa Barbara Municipal Airport (CA)	CFIT
Spanair
Flight designation	Location	Date	Aircraft type	Route	Cause
Flight 5022	Madrid	20 August 2008	McDonnell Douglas MD-82	Barcelona–Madrid–Gran Canaria	Pilot error, failure to extend flaps and slats for takeoff
Spantax
Flight designation	Location	Date	Aircraft type	Route	Cause
EC-ARZ	El Ortigal de Arriba	7 December 1965	Douglas C-47A	Tenerife–Las Palmas	Entered a spin after takeoff
EC-BNM	Arlanda Airport	5 January 1970	Convair CV-990-30A-5	Stockholm–Zürich	Pilot error, wind shear
Flight 275	Tenerife, Canary Islands	3 December 1972	Convair CV-990-30A-5	Tenerife–Munich	Pilot error
Flight 995	Málaga Airport	13 September 1982	Douglas DC-10-30	Madrid–Málaga–New York City	Landing gear tire failure, aborted take-off
Spencer Airways
Flight designation	Location	Date	Aircraft type	Route	Cause
VP-YFD	Croydon Airport	25 January 1947	Douglas C-47A	London–Rome–Salisbury	Pilot error, loss of control
Sriwijaya Air
Flight designation	Location	Date	Aircraft type	Route	Cause
Flight 62	Sultan Thaha Airport	27 August 2008	Boeing 737-200	Jakarta-Jambi	Hydraulic failure, runway overrun on landing
Flight 182; Citra	off Thousand Islands	9 January 2021	Boeing 737-524	Jakarta-Pontianak	Asymmetrical thrust setting due to a faulty autothrottle system
Sudan Airways
Flight designation	Location	Date	Aircraft type	Route	Cause
ST-ADY	near Malakal	16 August 1986	Fokker F27	Malakal–Khartoum	Shot down
Flight 139; White Nile	Port Sudan	8 July 2003	Boeing 737-2J8C	Port Sudan–Khartoum	Engine problems, pilot error
Flight 109	Khartoum International Airport	10 June 2008	Airbus A310-324	Amman–Damascus–Port Sudan–Khartoum	Weather, runway overrun
Surinam Airways
Flight designation	Location	Date	Aircraft type	Route	Cause
Flight 764	Paramaribo, Suriname	7 June 1989	Douglas DC-8	Amsterdam–Paramaribo	Pilot error
Swissair
Flight designation	Location	Date	Aircraft type	Route	Cause
CH-170	near Tuttlingen	27 July 1934	Curtiss AT-32C Condor II	Zurich–Stuttgart–Leipzig–Berlin	Vibration, fatigue, wing separation
HB-ITA	near Senlis	7 January 1939	Douglas DC-2-115B	Geneva–Paris	CFIT
HB-IXA	Konstanz	20 July 1939	Junkers Ju 86Z-2	Vienna–Zurich	Engine fire, loss of control
HB-IRW; Ticino	English Channel off Folkestone	19 June 1954	Convair CV-240-4	Geneva–London	Crew negligence, fuel exhaustion, water ditching
HB-IMD	Shannon Airport	15 July 1956	Convair CV-440-11	San Diego–New York City–Gander–Shannon–Zurich	Pilot error
HB-IRK	Bodensee	18 June 1957	Douglas C-47B	None	Stall, loss of control
Flight 306; Schaffhausen	Dürrenäsch	4 September 1963	Sud Aviation Caravelle III	Zurich-Geneva-Rome	In-flight fire, hydraulic failure, loss of control
HB-IMF	Jura Mountains	10 February 1967	Convair CV-440-11	None	CFIT
Flight 330; Baselland	Würenlingen	21 February 1970	Convair CV-990-30A-6	Zurich–Tel Aviv–Hong Kong	Terrorist bombing
Flight 100; Nidwalden	Zarqa, Jordan	13 September 1970	Douglas DC-8-53	Zurich–New York City	Hijacking, blown up on the ground
Flight 316; Uri	Athens	8 October 1979	Douglas DC-8-62	Geneva–Athens–Bombay–Beijing	Crew error, runway overrun
Flight 111; Vaud	off Peggy's Cove, Nova Scotia	2 September 1998	McDonnell Douglas MD-11	New York City–Geneva	In-flight fire, electrical and hydraulic failure, spatial disorientation, loss of control

== T ==
TAAG Angola Airlines
Flight designation	Location	Date	Aircraft type	Route	Cause
D2-TYC	near Matala	8 June 1980	Yakovlev Yak-40K	Lubango—Jamba	Possibly shot down
D2-EAS	near Menongue Airport	16 May 1981	Lockheed L-100-20 Hercules		Shot down
D2-TAB	Monte Bibala	29 November 1982	Antonov An-26		CFIT
Flight 462	near Lubango	8 November 1983	Boeing 737-2M2	Lubango—Luanda	Structural failure (official); Possible shoot down (unofficial)
D2-TFP	Maya Maya Airport	14 April 1997	Fokker F27-600	Brazzaville–Luanda	Loss of control on takeoff
D2-TBP	M'Banza Congo Airport	28 June 2007	Boeing 737-2M2	Luanda—M'Banza—Negage	Landed short of runway, right gear collapse
TACA (now Avianca El Salvador)
Flight designation	Location	Date	Aircraft type	Route	Cause
Flight 110	New Orleans	24 May 1988	Boeing 737-3T0	Belize City–New Orleans	Weather, design failure
Flight 510	Guatemala City	6 April 1993	Boeing 767-2S1ER		Pilot error
Flight 390	Tegucigalpa	30 May 2008	Airbus A320	La Paz–Tegucigalpa–San Pedro Sula–Miami	Runway overrun in bad weather
TAESA Lineas Aéreas
Flight designation	Location	Date	Aircraft type	Route	Cause
Flight 725	Uruapan	9 November 1999	Douglas DC-9-31	Mexico City–Uruapan–Tijuana	Failure to use checklists, spatial disorientation
TAG Airlines
Flight designation	Location	Date	Aircraft type	Route	Cause
Flight 730	Lake Erie off Cleveland, Ohio	28 January 1970	de Havilland Dove 6A	Cleveland—Detroit	Wing failure
Tajik Air
Flight designation	Location	Date	Aircraft type	Route	Cause
26035	63 mi from Tbilisi	17 June 1993	Antonov An-26B	Batumi–Baku–Chimkent	Severe turbulence, probable loss of control
87995	near Khorugh	28 August 1993	Yakovlev Yak-40	Khorugh–Dushanbe	Overloading, failure to take off, runway overrun
Flight 3183	near Sharjah Airport	15 December 1997	Tupolev Tu-154B-1	Dushanbe–Sharjah	Pilot error, CFIT
TAM Airlines (now LATAM Airlines Brasil)
Flight designation	Location	Date	Aircraft type	Route	Cause
PP-SBB	Agudos	8 February 1979	Embraer EMB 110C Bandeirante	Bauru–São Paulo	CFIT
PP-SBC	Rio das Ostras	28 June 1984	Embraer EMB 110C Bandeirante	Rio de Janeiro–Macaé	VFR in IMC, CFIT
PT-LCG	Bauru	12 February 1990	Fokker F27-200	São Paulo–Bauru–Araçatuba	Pilot error, ground collision (car)
Flight 402	Congonhas	31 October 1996	Fokker 100	São Paulo–Rio de Janeiro	Mechanical failure, pilot error
Flight 283	Suzano	9 July 1997	Fokker 100	São José–São Paulo	Bombing
Flight 9755	Belo Horizonte	15 September 2001	Fokker 100	Recife–Campinas–São Paulo	Right engine disintegration, explosive decompression
Flight 3804	Araçatuba	30 August 2002	Fokker 100	São Paulo–Campo Grande	Fuel starvation, emergency gear-up landing in a field
Flight 3499	Viracopos-Campinas International Airport	30 August 2002	Fokker 100	Salvador—São Paulo	Hydraulic system problems, emergency gear-up landing
Flight 3040	São Paulo	8 August 2006	Fokker 100	São Paulo–Recife	Passenger door opened and separated
Flight 3054	Congonhas	17 July 2007	Airbus A320-233	Porto Alegre–São Paulo	Pilot error, improper training, bad weather and short runway
TAP Air Portugal
Flight designation	Location	Date	Aircraft type	Route	Cause
Flight 425	Madeira	19 November 1977	Boeing 727-282	Brussels–Lisbon–Madeira	Overran runway due to poor weather and short runway
Flight 149	Ahmed Sékou Touré International Airport	2 September 2022	A320 Neo	Portugal to Guinea	Pilot error, crashed into vehicles when landing
Tara Air
Flight designation	Location	Date	Aircraft type	Route	Cause
9N-AFX	Okhaldhunga District	15 December 2010	de Havilland Canada Twin Otter 310	Lamidanda-Kathmandu	CFIT
Flight 193	Dana, Myadgi District	24 February 2016	Viking Air Twin Otter 400	Pokhara-Jomsom	Weather, VFR in IMC, loss of situational awareness, CFIT
Flight 197 (operated for Yeti Airlines)	Sanosware, Thasang	29 May 2022	de Havilland Canada Twin Otter 300	Pokhara–Jomsom	Controlled flight into terrain
TAROM
Flight designation	Location	Date	Aircraft type	Route	Cause
YR-IMB	near Paphos, Cyprus	24 February 1962	Ilyushin Il-18V	Bucharest–Nicosia–Tel Aviv	Loss of power, belly landing
YR-ILL	near Békéssámson, Hungary	13 June 1963	Ilyushin Il-14P	Munich–Constanta	Entered a dive
YR-ILB	near Cugir	9 October 1964	Ilyushin Il-14P	Timișoara–Bucharest	Windshear, severe turbulence, in-flight breakup
Flight 35	Vladeasa mountains	4 February 1970	Antonov An-24B	Bucharest-Oradea	Premature descent, CFIT
YR-BCA	near Kogalniceanu Airport	7 December 1970	BAC 1-11-424EU	Tel Aviv–Bucharest	CFIT
YR-AMD	Lotrului Mountains	29 December 1974	Antonov An-24RV	Oradea-Bucharest	Crew error, CFIT
YR-TPH	Nouadhibou Airport	7 August 1980	Tupolev Tu-154B-1	Bucharest–Nouadhibou	Crew error, water ditching
Flight 785A	Retezat Mountains	13 August 1991	Ilyushin Il-18V	Bucharest–Timișoara	Pilot error, CFIT
Flight 371; Muntenia	Baloteşti	31 March 1995	Airbus A310-324	Bucharest-Brussels	Misread instruments, loss of control
Flight 3107; Constanţa	Otopeni	30 December 2007	Boeing 737-38J	Bucharest-Sharm el Sheikh	ATC errors, poor visibility, ground collision (car)
TARS (now TAROM)
Flight designation	Location	Date	Aircraft type	Route	Cause
YR-TAI	Plouznice, Czech Republic	21 November 1947	Lisunov Li-2P	Bucharest–Prague	Spatial disorientation, CFIT
Unknown	Beograd Airport	9 December 1949	Douglas DC-3	Sibiu–Bucharest	Hijacking
TAT European Airlines
Flight designation	Location	Date	Aircraft type	Route	Cause
Flight 230	Fontainebleau, France	4 March 1988	Fairchild Hiller FH-227B	Nancy–Paris	Electrical failure, loss of control
F-GCPZ	Pleurtuit Airport	23 March 1991	Fairchild Hiller FH-227		Burned while parked
Tatarstan Airlines
Flight designation	Location	Date	Aircraft type	Route	Cause
Flight 363	Kazan International Airport	17 November 2013	Boeing 737-53A	Moscow-Kazan	Pilot error
Texas International Airlines
Flight designation	Location	Date	Aircraft type	Route	Cause
N1304T	over Harlingen, Texas	6 February 1969	Douglas DC-9-15MC	Little Rock-Harlingen	Mid-air collision with a Piper PA-28
Flight 926	Valley International Airport	11 January 1970	Douglas DC-9-31	McAllen-Harlingen-Houston-Dallas	Collision with obstacles on approach
Flight 655	Black Fork Mountain	27 September 1973	Convair 600	Memphis-Pine Bluff-El Dorado-Texarkana-Dallas	Pilot error, deviation from route, poor CRM, CFIT
Flight 987	Stapleton Int'l Airport	16 November 1976	Douglas DC-9-14	Denver–Houston	Mechanical failure, runway overrun
N9103	Ryan Field	17 March 1980	Douglas DC-9-14	Houston–Baton Rouge	Weather, runway overrun
Thai Airways Company
Flight designation	Location	Date	Aircraft type	Route	Cause
Flight 002	Chiang Mai Int'l Airport	25 December 1967	Douglas C-47A	Bangkok–Chiang Mai	Pilot disorientation, loss of control
Flight 231	9 mi NE of Bangkok	27 April 1980	HS 748-207 Srs. 2	Nakhon Phanom–Udon–Khon Kaen–Bangkok	Windshear
HS-TBB	near Phang Nga	15 April 1985	Boeing 737-2P5	Bangkok–Phuket	CFIT
Flight 365	Andaman Sea off Phuket	31 August 1987	Boeing 737-2P5	Hat Yai–Phuket	Pilot error, stall, loss of control
Thai Airways International
Flight designation	Location	Date	Aircraft type	Route	Cause
Flight 601; Chiraprapa	near Kai Tak Int'l Airport	30 June 1967	Sud Aviation Caravelle III	Tokyo–Taipei–Hong Kong–Bangkok	Weather, pilot error
HS-TGK; Tepamart	Bangkok Int'l Airport	9 July 1969	Sud Aviation Caravelle III	Hong Kong–Bangkok	Weather, possible windshear, heavy landing
Flight 311; Srisubhan	Tribhuvan International Airport	10 May 1973	Douglas DC-8-33	Bangkok-Kolkata–Kathmandu	Pilot error, runway overrun
Flight 620; Sukhothai	over Tosa Bay	26 October 1986	Airbus A300B4-601	Bangkok–Manila–Osaka	Bombing
Flight 311; Buri Ram	Langtang National Park	31 July 1992	Airbus A310-304	Bangkok–Kathmandu	CFIT
HS-THO; Srichulalak	Bangkok Int'l Airport	22 October 1994	Airbus A300B4-103	None	Ground collision with a Thai Airways MD-11
Flight 261; Phitsanulok	4 mi SW of Surat Thani	11 December 1998	Airbus A310-204	Bangkok–Surat Thani	Probable spatial disorientation
Flight 114; Narathiwat	Don Mueang Int'l Airport	3 March 2001	Boeing 737-4D7	Bangkok–Chiang Mai	Fuel tank explosion (while parked)
Flight 679; Song Dao	Suvarnabhumi Int'l Airport	8 September 2013	Airbus A330-321	Guangzhou–Bangkok	Landing gear collapse, runway excursion
Tianjin Airlines
Flight designation	Location	Date	Aircraft type	Route	Cause
Flight 7554	Hotan Airport	29 June 2012	Embraer E190-100LR	Hotan-Ürümqi	Attempted hijacking
Toa Airways
Flight designation	Location	Date	Aircraft type	Route	Cause
JA6158	Mount Ohira	23 February 1962	de Havilland Heron 1B	Hiroshima–Hōfu	CFIT
Toa Domestic Airlines (TDA)
Flight designation	Location	Date	Aircraft type	Route	Cause
Flight 63	Yokotsu Mountain	3 July 1971	NAMC YS-11A-217	Sapporo-Hakodate	CFIT
Flight 621	Itami Airport	28 May 1975	NAMC YS-11-125	Osaka-Oki Island	Mechanical failure, runway excursion
Flight 670	Miho Airport	10 January 1988	NAMC YS-11-109	Yonago-Osaka	Icing, runway overrun
Transair Georgia
Flight designation	Location	Date	Aircraft type	Route	Cause
4L-65893	Black Sea off Sukhumi	21 September 1993	Tupolev Tu-134A	Sochi–Sukhumi	Shot down by the Abkhaz forces in the course of war
4L-65001	Babusheri Airport	23 September 1993	Tupolev Tu-134A	Sukhumi–Tbilisi	Destroyed on the ground by Abkhaz forces
TransAsia Airways
Flight designation	Location	Date	Aircraft type	Route	Cause
Flight 791	off Makung City	21 December 2002	ATR 72-202	Taipei–Macau	Icing, loss of control
Flight 222	Husi, Penghu	23 July 2014	ATR 72-500	Kaohsiung–Magong	Pilot error, CFIT
Flight 235	Taipei	4 February 2015	ATR 72-600	Taipei–Kinmen	Engine failure, pilot error
TransAVIAexport Airlines
Flight designation	Location	Date	Aircraft type	Route	Cause
EW-78849	Mogadishu	23 March 2007	Ilyushin Il-76TD	Mogadishu–Djibouti–Minsk	Possible shootdown
Transcontinental Air Transport (TAT)
Flight designation	Location	Date	Aircraft type	Route	Cause
NC9649; City of San Francisco	Mount Taylor, New Mexico	3 September 1929	Ford 5-AT-B Tri-Motor	Albuquerque-Los Angeles	Lightning strike, CFIT
Unknown	Amarillo, Texas	30 December 1929	Travel Air 6000		Crashed on approach
Transocean Air Lines
Flight designation	Location	Date	Aircraft type	Route	Cause
N79998	9 mi off Lurga Point	15 August 1949	Douglas C-54A	Rome-New York City	Poor CRM
Flight 5763	Tucumcari Airport	5 November 1951	Martin 2-0-2	Oakland-Albuquerque	Poor visibility, pilot error
Flight 501	near Fairbanks, Alaska	30 December 1951	Curtiss C-46F Commando	Umiat-Fairbanks	Pilot error, spatial disorientation
Flight 942	12 mi SW of Alvarado, California	20 March 1953	Douglas C-54G	Roswell-Oakland-Guam	Loss of control for reasons unknown (possible wing icing)
Flight 512; The Royal Hawaiian	Pacific Ocean, 344 mi E of Wake Island	12 July 1953	Douglas DC-6	Guam-Wake Island-Honolulu-Oakland	Undetermined
Transports Aériens Intercontinentaux (TAI)
Flight designation	Location	Date	Aircraft type	Route	Cause
F-BELB	10 mi S of Bangui Airport	8 December 1950	Douglas C-54A	Paris–Bangui–Dar es-Salaam	Crew errors, CFIT
F-BGOD	near Cairo	20 February 1956	Douglas DC-6B	Saigon–Calcutta–Karachi–Bahrain–Cairo-Paris	Pilot error, crew error, crew fatigue, improper approach
Flight 307	Bordeaux–Mérignac Airport	24 September 1959	Douglas DC-7C	Paris–Bordeaux–Bamako–Abidjan	CFIT
Trans Service Airlift
Flight designation	Location	Date	Aircraft type	Route	Cause
9Q-CCR	Jamba Airport	18 December 1995	Lockheed L-188C Electra	Jamba–Kinshasa	Overloading, loss of control
Trans World Airlines (TWA)
Trigana Air Service
Flight designation	Location	Date	Aircraft type	Route	Cause
PK-YNM	Mount Deyjay	4 November 1994	de Havilland Canada Twin Otter 100	Nabire–Obano	CFIT
PK-YPZ	31 mi from Nabire	25 May 2002	de Havilland Canada Twin Otter 300	Nabire–Enarotali	CFIT
PK-YPY	Puncak Jaya	17 November 2006	de Havilland Canada Twin Otter 300	Mulia–Ilaga	CFIT
Flight 168	near Sepingan Airport	11 February 2010	ATR 42-300	Tanjung Redep–Samarinda	Double engine failure, forced landing
Flight 257	Papua, Indonesia	16 August 2015	ATR 42-300	Jayapura–Oksibil	Deviation from approach, CFIT
Tupolev
Flight designation	Location	Date	Aircraft type	Route	Cause
CCCP-N20	over Moscow	18 May 1935	Tupolev ANT-20	None	Mid-air collision
CCCP-45076	near Chkalovsky Airport	14 January 1966	Tupolev Tu-134	None	Loss of control
CCCP-77102	Goussainville, Val-d'Oise	3 June 1973	Tupolev Tu-144S	None	In-flight breakup, loss of control
CCCP-77111	Khabarovsk Novy Airport	23 May 1978	Tupolev Tu-144D	None	Fuel leak, in-flight fire
Turkish Airlines (Türk Hava Yolları)
Flight designation	Location	Date	Aircraft type	Route	Cause
TC-SEV	near Gatwick Airport	17 February 1959	Vickers Viscount 794D	Ankara-Istanbul–Rome-London	Weather, CFIT for reasons unknown
Flight 835	Etimesgut, Ankara	23 September 1961	Fokker F27-100	Cyprus–Adana–Ankara–Istanbul	Pilot error
TC-KOP	Mt. Medetsiz	8 March 1962	Fairchild F-27	Istanbul–Ankara–Adana	Spatial disorientation
TC-ETI	Ankara	3 February 1964	Douglas C-47A	Istanbul–Ankara	Disregard of procedure
TC-JAC	near Adana Airport	21 January 1972	Douglas DC-9-32	Damascus–Ankara	Downwind during emergency landing
Flight 301; Van	Cumaovası, Izmir	26 January 1974	Fokker F28-1000	Izmir-Istanbul	Wing icing, stall, loss of control
Flight 981; Ankara	Ermenonville	3 March 1974	McDonnell Douglas DC-10-10	Istanbul-Paris-London	Design error, mechanical failure (faulty cargo door)
Flight 345; Bursa	Sea of Marmara	30 January 1975	Fokker F28-1000	Izmir–Istanbul	Possible downwind during landing
Flight 452; Antalya	near Isparta	19 September 1976	Boeing 727-2F2	Istanbul–Antalya	Navigation error, CFIT
TC-JAT; Trabzon	Çubuk, Ankara	23 December 1979	Fokker F28-1000	Samsun–Ankara	Deviation from course
Flight 890; Diyarbakır	Diyarbakır	13 October 1980	Boeing 727-200	Istanbul–Ankara	Hijacking
Flight 158; Afyon	Esenboğa Airport	16 January 1983	Boeing 727-2F2	Istanbul–Ankara	Poor visibility, crash short of runway
Flight 278; Mersin	Van	29 December 1994	Boeing 737-4Y0	Ankara–Van	Poor visibility, CFIT
Flight 5904; Trakya	Ceyhan	7 April 1999	Boeing 737-4Q8	Adana–Jeddah	Weather, possible icing, crew error
Flight 634; Konya	Diyarbakır	8 January 2003	Avro RJ100	Istanbul–Diyarbakır	CFIT
Flight 1476	Papola Casale Airport	3 October 2006	Boeing 737-4Y0	Tirana–Istanbul	Hijacking
Flight 1951; Tekirdağ	near Schiphol, Amsterdam	25 February 2009	Boeing 737-800	Istanbul-Amsterdam	Instrument failure, stall, loss of control
Flight 1754	Atatürk Airport	5 January 2011	Boeing 737-8F2	Oslo–Istanbul	Attempted hijacking
Flight 1878; Gümüşhane	Atatürk Airport	25 April 2015	Airbus A320-232	Milan–Istanbul	Hard landing leading to fire, landing gear collapse and runway excursion
Flight 6491 (leased from MyCargo Airlines)	near Manas International Airport	16 January 2017	Boeing 747-412F	Hong Kong–Bishkek	CFIT

== U ==
Ukraine International Airlines
Flight designation	Location	Date	Aircraft type	Route	Cause
Flight 752	near Shahriar, Iran	8 January 2020	Boeing 737-8KV	Tehran–Kyiv	Accidental shootdown
United Airlines
Flight designation	Location	Date	Aircraft type	Route	Cause
Trip 23	Chesterton, Indiana	10 October 1933	Boeing 247D	Newark–Cleveland–Chicago–Oakland	Bombing
NC13357	Parley's Canyon, Utah	23 February 1934	Boeing 247	Salt Lake City–Cheyenne	Poor visibility, weather, CFIT
Flight 6	Western Springs, Illinois	20 December 1934	Boeing 247	Chicago–Omaha	Icing, loss of power
Trip 4	near Silver Crown, Wyoming	7 October 1935	Boeing 247D	Oakland–Salt Lake City–Denver–Cheyenne	Pilot error
NC13323	Cheyenne	30 October 1935	Boeing 247D	None	Pilot error
Flight 34	Rice Canyon, California	27 December 1936	Boeing 247D	San Francisco–Los Angeles	Pilot error
Flight 23	off San Francisco	9 February 1937	Douglas DC-3A-197	Los Angeles–San Francisco–Oakland	Loss of control due to co-pilot dropping microphone
Flight 1	Haydens Peak, Wyoming	17 October 1937	Douglas DC-3-197	Newark–Chicago–Cheyenne–Salt Lake City–Los Angeles	Weather, CFIT
Flight 9	Cleveland	24 May 1938	Douglas DST-A-207A	Newark–Cleveland–Chicago	In-flight fire, loss of control
Flight 6	off Point Reyes, California	29 November 1938	Douglas DC-3A-191	Seattle–Portland–Medford–Sacramento–Oakland–San Francisco–Fresno–Bakersfield–Los Angeles–San Diego	Pilot error, fuel exhaustion, water ditching
Flight 16	Bountiful Peak, Utah	4 November 1940	Douglas DC-3-197	Oakland–San Francisco–Sacramento–Reno–Elko–Salt Lake City	Weather, loss of radio communication, pilot error, CFIT
Flight 21	Chicago	4 December 1940	Douglas DC-3A-197C	New York–Philadelphia–Allentown–Akron–Cleveland–Chicago	Possible icing, stall, loss of control
NC16072	Salt Lake City Municipal Airport	12 January 1941	Douglas DC-3A-197	None	Burned in hangar fire
Flight 4	Salt Lake City	1 May 1942	Douglas DST-A-207A	San Francisco–Oakland–Salt Lake City–New York City	Deviation from course for reasons unknown, CFIT
41-24027	Whenuapai, New Zealand	2 August 1943	Consolidated C-87 Liberator Express	Whenuapai–Amberley	Pilot error, CFIT
Flight 14; Mainliner Tacoma	Elk Mountain	31 January 1946	Douglas DC-3-194H	Portland–Pendleton–Boise–Denver	Deviation from course, CFIT
Flight 28; Mainliner Lake Michigan	near Cheyenne	8 October 1946	Douglas DC-4	San Francisco–Cheyenne–Chicago	Loss of altitude on approach
Flight 404; Mainliner Elko	Cleveland, Ohio	11 November 1946	Douglas C-53D (DC-3)	Chicago–Cleveland	Pilot error
Flight 521; Mainliner Lake Tahoe	LaGuardia Airport	29 May 1947	Douglas C-54B	New York City–Cleveland	Pilot error
Flight 608; Mainliner Washington D.C.	Bryce Canyon, Utah	24 October 1947	Douglas DC-6	Los Angeles–Denver–Chicago	Design flaw, in-flight fire
Flight 624; Mainliner Utah	Aristes, Pennsylvania	17 June 1948	Douglas DC-6	San Diego–Los Angeles–Chicago–New York City	False warning of in-flight fire, crew error operating extinguishers
Flight 129	near Fort Wayne, Indiana	28 April 1951	Douglas DC-3A-197	Cleveland–Fort Wayne–South Bend–Chicago	Windshear
Flight 610; Mainliner Overland Trail	Crystal Mountain, Colorado	30 June 1951	Douglas DC-6	San Francisco–Oakland–Salt Lake City–Denver–Chicago	Deviation from course for reasons unknown, CFIT
Flight 615; Mainliner Omaha	near Decoto, California	24 August 1951	Douglas DC-6B	Boston–Hartford–Cleveland–Chicago–Oakland–San Francisco	Pilot error, navigation error, CFIT
Flight 7030; Mainliner Oahu	off Redwood City, California	12 September 1951	Boeing Stratocruiser 10–34	None	Stall, loss of control
Flight 16	Stapleton Int'l Airport	4 December 1951	Douglas DC-3A	None	Stall, loss of control
Flight 314	Michigan City, Indiana	26 August 1953	Convair CV-340-31	Chicago-Detroit	Mid-air collision with an American Airlines Convair 240
N37512; Mainliner Idaho	Long Island MacArthur Airport	4 April 1955	Douglas DC-6	None	Pilot error, loss of control
Flight 409; Mainliner Capistrano	Medicine Bow Peak	6 October 1955	Douglas DC-4	New York City–Chicago–Denver–Salt Lake City–San Francisco	Deviation from course for reasons unknown, CFIT
Flight 629; Mainliner Denver	Longmont, Colorado	1 November 1955	Douglas DC-6B	New York City–Chicago–Denver–Portland–Seattle	Bombing
Flight 718; Mainliner Vancouver	Grand Canyon	30 June 1956	Douglas DC-7	Los Angeles–Chicago–New York City	Mid-air collision with TWA Constellation
Flight 736	Arden, Nevada	21 April 1958	Douglas DC-7	Los Angeles–Denver–New York City	Mid-air collision with USAF F-100 fighter
Flight 826; Mainliner Will Rogers	over Staten Island	16 December 1960	Douglas DC-8-11	Chicago–New York City	Mid-air collision with TWA Constellation
Flight 859	Stapleton Int'l Airport	11 July 1961	Douglas DC-8-12	Philadelphia–Chicago–Omaha–Denver	Mechanical failure, pilot error
Flight 297	Howard County, Maryland	23 November 1962	Vickers Viscount 745D	Newark–Washington DC	Bird strike, loss of control
Flight 823	near Parrottsville, Tennessee	9 July 1964	Vickers Viscount 745D	Philadelphia–Washington DC–Knoxville–Huntsville	In-flight fire for reasons unknown, loss of control
Flight 389	Lake Michigan off Chicago	16 August 1965	Boeing 727-22	New York City–Chicago	CFIT for reasons unknown
Flight 227	Salt Lake City International Airport	11 November 1965	Boeing 727-22	New York City–Cleveland–Chicago–Denver–Salt Lake City–San Francisco	Crashed short of the runway, pilot error
Flight 459	Cuba	11 January 1969	Boeing 727	Jacksonville, TX–Miami	Hijacking
Flight 266	Pacific Ocean off Los Angeles	18 January 1969	Boeing 727-22C	Los Angeles–Denver–Milwaukee	Mechanical failure, total loss of electrical power, spatial disorientation
Flight 14	over Riverside, California	25 June 1969	Douglas DC-8	Los Angeles–New York City	Hijacking
Flight 611; City of Bristol	Philadelphia Int'l Airport	19 July 1970	Boeing 737-222	Philadelphia–Rochester	Engine failure, pilot error, runway overrun on takeoff
Flight 553; City of Lincoln	Chicago	8 December 1972	Boeing 737-222	Washington, D.C.–Chicago	Approach landing stall, pilot error
Flight 2860	near Kaysville, Utah	18 December 1977	Douglas DC-8-54F	San Francisco–Salt Lake City	Electrical failure, pilot error, ATC error
Flight 173	Portland, Oregon	28 December 1978	Douglas DC-8-61	New York City–Denver–Portland	Fuel exhaustion, pilot error
Flight 2885	Detroit Metropolitan Wayne County Airport	11 January 1983	Douglas DC-8-54F	Cleveland–Detroit–Los Angeles	Aircraft upset, crew error
Flight 811	Pacific Ocean	24 February 1989	Boeing 747-122	Honolulu–Auckland–Sydney	Cargo door opened—explosive decompression
Flight 232	Sioux City, Iowa	19 July 1989	McDonnell Douglas DC-10-10	Denver–Philadelphia	Manufacturing error, engine failure
Flight 585	Colorado Springs, Colorado	3 March 1991	Boeing 737-291	Peoria–Moline-Denver-Colorado Springs	Mechanical failure, rudder reversion
Flight 826	Pacific Ocean, 956 mi ESE of Tokyo	28 December 1997	Boeing 747-122	Tokyo-Honolulu	Severe turbulence
N7274U	Eppley Airfield	13 May 2001	Boeing 727-222	None	Damaged by hailstorm
Flight 175	World Trade Center, New York City	11 September 2001	Boeing 767-222	Boston–Los Angeles	Terrorism, hijacking
Flight 93	Stonycreek Township, Somerset County, Pennsylvania	11 September 2001	Boeing 757-222	Newark–San Francisco	Terrorism, hijacking
Flight 955	Heathrow Airport	5 July 2007	Boeing 777-222ER		Mechanical failure, on-board fire
Flight 634	Newark Liberty Int'l Airport	10 January 2010	Airbus A319-131	Chicago–Newark	Landing gear failure
Flight 663	en route from Washington, DC to Denver	7 April 2010	Boeing 757-222	Washington DC–Denver–Las Vegas	Suspicious activity
Flight 497	Louis Armstrong New Orleans Int'l Airport	7 April 2011	Airbus A320		Electrical failure, runway overrun
Flight 1175	Pacific Ocean	13 February 2018	Boeing 777-222	San Francisco-Honolulu	Engine failure
Flight 627	Newark Liberty International Airport	15 June 2019	Boeing 757-224	Denver-Newark	Hard landing
Flight 328	Over Broomfield, Colorado	20 February 2021	Boeing 777-222	Denver-Honolulu	Uncontained engine failure
Flight 35	San Francisco International Airport	7 March 2024	Boeing 777	San Francisco-Los Angeles-Osaka	Plane lost a main landing gear wheel; plane made emergency landing at a parking lot at Los Angeles International Airport where it hit and damaged several vehicles
Flight 1001	Los Angeles International Airport	8 July 2024	Boeing 757-200	Los Angeles-Denver	Plane lost a main landing gear wheel
Flight 202	Kahului Airport	24 December 2024	Boeing 787-10 Dreamliner	Chicago-Maui	Body found in one of the landing gears upon landing
Flight 2225	Albuquerque International Airport	31 December 2024	Boeing 757-324	Chicago-Albuquerque-Phoenix	Smoke in the cockpit
Flight 1727	O'Hare International Airport	12 January 2025	Boeing 737 MAX 9	Chicago-Phoenix	Collision with a coyote on runway
Flight 613	Lagos, Nigeria	24 January 2025	Boeing 787-8 Dreamliner	Lagos-Dulles	Mid-air jolt
Flight 2143	Newark Liberty International Airport	28 January 2025	Boeing 767-400	Newark-San Juan	Fire alarm triggered
Flight 1382	George Bush Intercontinental Airport	2 February 2025	Airbus A320	Houston-LaGuardia	Engine failure
United Arab Airlines (now EgyptAir)
Flight designation	Location	Date	Aircraft type	Route	Cause
Flight 738	17 mi off Elba	29 September 1960	Vickers Viscount 739B		In-flight breakup
Flight 869	Khao Yai Mountain	19 July 1962	de Havilland Comet 4C	Hong Kong–Bangkok–Cairo	CFIT
SU-AJX	Az Zahweyyin, Egypt	12 May 1963	Douglas DC-3	Cairo–Alexandria	CFIT
Flight 869	6 mi off Bombay Airport	27 July 1963	de Havilland Comet 4C		Loss of control
Flight 749	near Cairo	18 March 1966	Antonov An-24B		Pilot error
SU-AOL	180 km off Cyprus	18 August 1968	Antonov An-24B	Cairo–Damascus	Controlled flight into water
SU-APC	Aswan Airport	20 March 1969	Ilyushin Il-18D	Jeddah–Aswan	Poor visibility, pilot error, pilot fatigue
ET-AAQ (leased from Ethiopian Airlines)	2 mi south of Suez	10 April 1969	Douglas C-47A	Asmara–Cairo	Shot down
SU-ANZ	Cairo	19 July 1970	Antonov An-24B	None	Pilot error, stall, loss of control
Flight 844	4 mi from Tripoli International Airport	2 January 1971	de Havilland Comet 4C		Poor visibility, pilot error
UPS Airlines
Flight designation	Location	Date	Aircraft type	Route	Cause
N568UP	Corbin Airport	31 January 1985	Swearingen Expediter	Louisville–London	Overloading, failed to go-around, ran off runway
Flight 774	Ellington Field	11 September 1998	Boeing 767-34AF	Louisville–Houston	Weather, runway excursion
Flight 6971	Standiford Field	7 June 2005	McDonnell Douglas MD-11F	Anchorage–Louisville	Pilot error, nose gear failure
Flight 1307	Philadelphia	8 February 2006	Douglas DC-8-71	Atlanta–Philadelphia	In-flight fire for reasons unknown
Flight 6	Dubai	3 September 2010	Boeing 747-44AF (SCD)	Dubai–Cologne	In-flight fire, loss of control
Flight 1354	near Birmingham-Shuttlesworth International Airport	14 August 2013	Airbus A300F4-622R	Louisville–Birmingham	Pilot error, CFIT
Flight 61	Incheon International Airport	6 June 2016	McDonnell Douglas MD-11F	Seoul–Anchorage	Runway excursion
Flight 2976	near Louisville Muhammad Ali International Airport	4 November 2025	McDonnell Douglas MD-11F	Louisville–Honolulu	Engine fire and separation, under investigation
Ural Airlines
Flight designation	Location	Date	Aircraft type	Route	Cause
Flight 178	near Zhukovsky International Airport	15 August 2019	Airbus A321-211	Moscow–Simferopol	Bird strikes, forced landing
Uruguayan Air Force
Flight designation	Location	Date	Aircraft type	Route	Cause
Flight 571	Border between Chile and Argentina	13 October 1972	Fairchild FH-227	Montevideo–Mendoza–Santiago	CFIT
US Airways (formerly USAir)
Flight designation	Location	Date	Aircraft type	Route	Cause
Flight 5050	Flushing, Queens	20 September 1989	Boeing 737-401	New York–Charlotte	Crew error
Flight 1493	Los Angeles, California	1 February 1991	Boeing 737-300	Syracuse–Washington DC–Columbus–Los Angeles–San Francisco	Ground collision
Flight 405	Flushing, Queens	22 March 1992	Fokker F-28	New York–Cleveland	Ice buildup, pilot error, inadequate deicing procedures
Flight 427	Aliquippa, Pennsylvania	8 September 1994	Boeing 737-300	Chicago–Pittsburgh–Palm Beach	Mechanical failure
Flight 1016	Charlotte, North Carolina	2 July 1994	Douglas DC-9	Columbia–Charlotte	Wind shear, crew error
Flight 1170	Logan International Airport	9 June 2005	Boeing 737-3B7	Boston–Philadelphia	Near collision
Flight 1549	Hudson River, New York	15 January 2009	Airbus A320	New York–Charlotte–Seattle	Bird strike, loss of power to both engines
Union des Transports Aériens (UTA)
Flight designation	Location	Date	Aircraft type	Route	Cause
F-BHMS	Mount Alcazaba	2 October 1964	Douglas DC-6B		Undetermined
Flight 772	Sahara Desert	19 September 1989	McDonnell Douglas DC-10-30	N'Djamena–Paris	Terrorist bombing
Union des Transports Africains de Guinée (UTA)
Flight designation	Location	Date	Aircraft type	Route	Cause
Flight 141	Bight of Benin	25 December 2003	Boeing 727-223	Cotonou–Kufra–Beirut–Dubai	Overloading, failed to take off
US-Bangla Airlines
Flight designation	Location	Date	Aircraft type	Route	Cause
Flight 211	Tribhuvan International Airport	12 March 2018	Bombardier Dash 8 Q400	Dhaka–Kathmandu	Pilot error, spatial disorientation, loss of situational awareness
UTair Aviation (now Utair)
Flight designation	Location	Date	Aircraft type	Route	Cause
RA-26012	Antalya Airport	9 November 2002	Antonov An-26B		Weather, poor visibility, CFIT
Flight 471	Kurumoch Airport	17 March 2007	Tupolev Tu-134A-3	Surgut–Samara–Belgorod	Hard landing, structural failure
VQ-BAC	Vnukovo International Airport	16 January 2010	Boeing 737-500		Runway overrun
Flight 120	Roschino International Airport	2 April 2012	ATR 72–201	Tyumen–Surgut	Crew error, wing icing, stall, loss of control
Flight 579	Sochi International Airport	1 September 2018	Boeing 737-8AS	Moscow–Sochi	Pilot error, windshear, runway overrun

== V ==
ValuJet Airlines
Flight designation	Location	Date	Aircraft type	Route	Cause
Flight 592	Everglades	11 May 1996	McDonnell Douglas DC-9-32	Miami–Atlanta	In-flight fire
Varig
Flight designation	Location	Date	Aircraft type	Route	Cause
PP-VAL; Mauá	Porto Alegre Airport	28 February 1942	Junkers Ju 52/3mge		Crashed after takeoff
PP-VBI	Jaquirana	2 August 1949	Curtiss C-46D	São Paulo-Porto Alegre	In-flight fire
PP-VBZ	São Paulo–Congonhas Airport	4 June 1954	Curtiss C-46A	São Paulo-Porto Alegre	Crew error, crash on takeoff
PP-VCF	Bagé Airport	7 April 1957	Curtiss C-46A	Bagé-Porto Alegre	In-flight fire, wing separation, loss of control
PP-VCS	Salgado Filho International Airport	18 October 1957	Douglas C-47A	Porto Alegre–São Paulo	Crew error, possible engine failure, ground turbulence
PP-CDS	Federal Airport	12 April 1960	Douglas C-53	Jaguarão–Rio Grande–Pelotas–Porto Alegre	Pilot error
Flight 810	La Cruz Peak	27 November 1962	Boeing 707-441	Rio de Janeiro–Lima–Bogota–Panama City–Mexico City–Los Angeles	Deviation from course for reasons unknown
PP-VCQ	near Brasília	22 December 1962	Convair CV-240-2	Rio de Janeiro–Belo Horizonte–Brasília	Unexplained descent
PP-VBV	near Passo Fundo Airport	1 July 1963	Douglas C-47B	Porto Alegre–Passo Fundo	Weather, pilot error
Flight 837	Roberts International Airport	5 March 1967	Douglas DC-8-33	Rome–Monrovia–Rio de Janeiro	Pilot error
PP-VBJ	Gravatá	15 July 1968	Curtiss C-46 Super C	São Paulo–Recife	CFIT
PP-VLJ	Galeão International Airport	9 June 1973	Boeing 707-323C	São Paulo–Rio de Janeiro	Crew error, loss of control
Flight 820	Orly International Airport	11 July 1973	Boeing 707-345C	Rio de Janeiro–Paris	In-flight fire
Flight 967	125 mi off Japan	30 January 1979	Boeing 707-323C	Tokyo–Los Angeles–Rio de Janeiro	Unexplained disappearance
Flight 797	Abidjan	3 January 1987	Boeing 707-379C	Abidjan–Rio de Janeiro	Engine failure
Flight 254	Mato Grosso	3 September 1989	Boeing 737-241	São Paulo–Marabá–Belém	Fuel exhaustion and pilot error
Varney Air Lines
Flight designation	Location	Date	Aircraft type	Route	Cause
NC741K	Bluff Mountain	21 January 1931	Boeing 40B-4	Portland–Pasco	CFIT
NC10338	Pasco, Washington	26 November 1931	Boeing 40B-4	Portland–Pasco	Poor visibility
NC891E	near Walsenburg, Colorado	1 May 1935	Lockheed Vega 5C		Engine failure
NC176W	Walsenburg, Colorado	28 September 1936	Lockheed Vega 5C	El Paso–Puebla	Engine failure, CFIT
VASP
Flight designation	Location	Date	Aircraft type	Route	Cause
Flight 376	Brasília	25 May 1982	Boeing 737-2A1	São Paulo–Brasília	Weather conditions
Flight 168	Fortaleza	8 June 1982	Boeing 727-212 Advanced	Rio de Janeiro–Fortaleza	CFIT
Vietnam Airlines
Vladivostok Air
Flight designation	Location	Date	Aircraft type	Route	Cause
Flight 352	Budarovka, Russia	4 July 2001	Tupolev Tu-154M	Ekaterinburg–Irkutsk–Vladivostok	Pilot error
Vnukovo Airlines
Flight designation	Location	Date	Aircraft type	Route	Cause
Flight 2801	Operafjellet, Norway	29 August 1996	Tupolev Tu-154M	Moscow-Svalbard	CFIT
Voepass (formerly Passaredo)
Flight designation	Location	Date	Aircraft type	Route	Cause
Flight 2283	Vinhedo, Brazil	9 August 2024	ATR 72-500	Cascavel-São Paulo	
Volga-Dnepr Airlines
Flight designation	Location	Date	Aircraft type	Route	Cause
Flight 4066	Tolmachevo Airport	13 November 2020	Antonov An-124	Incheon-Novosibirsk-Vienna	Uncontained engine failure on takeoff, runway overrun

== W ==
Walcot Air Line
Flight designation	Location	Date	Aircraft type	Route	Cause
G-AAZK	near Meopham, Kent	21 July 1930	Junkers F.13ge	Le Torquet-Croydon	Stall, loss of control
West Caribbean Airways
Flight designation	Location	Date	Aircraft type	Route	Cause
Flight 708	near Machiques	16 August 2005	McDonnell Douglas MD-82	Panama City-Martinique	Poor CRM, updrafts, stall, loss of control
West Coast Airlines
Flight designation	Location	Date	Aircraft type	Route	Cause
Flight 956	Wemme, Oregon	1 October 1966	Douglas DC-9-14	San Francisco-Eugene-Portland-Seattle	Excessive descent for reasons unknown
Flight 720	Klamath Falls, Oregon	10 March 1967	Fokker F27 Friendship	Klamath Falls-Medford	Crashed after takeoff due to an icing accident
Western Airlines
Flight designation	Location	Date	Aircraft type	Route	Cause
NC13314	Burbank, California	1 September 1935	Boeing 247D	Burbank-Saugus	Engine failure, loss of altitude
Flight 6	near Salt Lake City	15 December 1936	Boeing 247D	Las Vegas-Salt Lake City	CFIT
Flight 7	near Newhall, California	12 January 1937	Boeing 247D	Salt Lake City-Burbank	CFIT
Flight 1	near Fairfield, Utah	15 December 1942	Douglas DC-3A-191		Pilot error
NC33621	near Hollywood, California	24 April 1946	Douglas DC-3A-367	None	Improper maintenance, engine failure, pilot error
Flight 23	14 mi S of Lebec, California	13 November 1946	Douglas DC-3A	Las Vegas-Burbank	Radio problems, pilot error, CFIT
Flight 44	50 mi E of San Diego	24 December 1946	Douglas DC-3A	Holtville-San Diego	Pilot error, CFIT
Flight 636	San Francisco Bay	20 April 1953	Douglas DC-6B	Los Angeles-San Francisco-Oakland	Optical illusion, pilot error, controlled flight into water
N15569	Los Angeles International Airport	29 June 1953	Douglas DC-3A	None	Maintenance error, loss of control
Flight 34	19 mi ENE of Wright, Wyoming	26 February 1954	Convair CV-240-1	Salt Lake City-Rapid City	Weather, loss of control for reasons unknown
N8406H	over Daggett, California	25 July 1957	Convair CV-240-1	Las Vegas-Los Angeles	Bombing
Flight 366	Ontario International Airport	31 March 1971	Boeing 720-047B	None	Poor visibility, rudder failure, loss of control
Flight 701	Algeria	2 June 1972	Boeing 727	Los Angeles-Seattle	Hijacking
Flight 470	Casper Airport	31 March 1975	Boeing 737-247	Denver-Casper-Minneapolis	Runway overrun
Flight 44	Buffalo, Wyoming	31 July 1979	Boeing 737-200		Pilot error, landed at wrong airport
Flight 2605	Juarez International Airport	31 October 1979	McDonnell Douglas DC-10-10	Los Angeles-Mexico City	Poor CRM, runway confusion, collision with truck on runway
Widerøe
Flight designation	Location	Date	Aircraft type	Route	Cause
Flight 933	Barents Sea off Gamvik	11 March 1982	de Havilland Canada DHC-6-300	Kirkenes-Vadsø-Berlevåg-Mehamn-Honningsvåg-Alta	Clear-air turbulence, pilot error, structural failure, loss of control
Flight 710	Torghatten	6 May 1988	de Havilland Canada DHC-7-102	Trondheim-Namsos-Brønnøysund-Sandnessjøen-Bodø	Pilot error, CFIT
Flight 839	Værøy	12 April 1990	de Havilland Canada DHC-6-300	Værøy-Bodø	Windshear, structural failure, loss of control
Flight 744	Berg, Overhalla	27 October 1993	de Havilland Canada DHC-6-300	Trondheim-Namsos	Crew error, CFIT
World Airways
Flight designation	Location	Date	Aircraft type	Route	Cause
Flight 830	near Agana Naval Air Station	19 September 1960	Douglas DC-6	Agana NAS–Wake Island Airfield	Pilot error, CFIT
Flight 30H	Logan International Airport	23 January 1982	McDonnell Douglas DC-10-30CF	Oakland–Newark–Boston	Weather, runway excursion
Wuhan Airlines
Flight designation	Location	Date	Aircraft type	Route	Cause
B-4211	Huajia	8 October 1992	Avia 14M	Lanzhou-Xian	Engine failure, CFIT
Flight 343	Hanyang District, Wuhan	22 June 2000	Xian Y-7-100	Enshi City-Wuhan	Lightning strike, windshear

== X ==
Xiamen Airlines (now XiamenAir)
Flight designation	Location	Date	Aircraft type	Route	Cause
Flight 8301	Guangzhou Baiyun Int'l Airport	2 October 1990	Boeing 737-247	Xiamen–Guangzhou	Hijacking, runway collision with a China Southwest Boeing 707 and China Southern Boeing 757
Flight 8667	Ninoy Aquino Int'l Airport	16 August 2018	Boeing 737-85C	Xiamen–Manila	Pilot error, skidded off runway

== Y ==
YAK-Service
Flight designation	Location	Date	Aircraft type	Route	Cause
RA-42434	near Yaroslavl	7 September 2011	Yakovlev Yak-42D	Yaroslavl-Minsk	Pilot error
Yemenia
Flight designation	Location	Date	Aircraft type	Route	Cause
Flight 626	Moroni, Comoros Islands	30 June 2009	Airbus A310-324	Sanaa-Moroni	Crew error, stall, loss of control
Yeti Airlines
Flight designation	Location	Date	Aircraft type	Route	Cause
Flight 117	near Lukla	25 May 2004	de Havilland Canada Twin Otter 300	Kathmandu–Lukla	Pilot negligence, crew errors, CFIT
9N-AEQ	near Jumla Airport	21 June 2006	de Havilland Canada Twin Otter 300	Surkhet–Jumla	Pilot error, CFIT
Flight 101	Tenzing–Hillary Airport	8 October 2008	de Havilland Canada Twin Otter 300	Kathmandu–Lukla	Weather, pilot error, CFIT
Flight 691	near Pokhara International Airport	15 January 2023	ATR 72-500	Kathmandu–Pokhara	Stall on approach due to accidental feathering of propellers

== See also ==
- Lists of disasters
