= Yeti Airlines Flight 691 =

2023 aviation accident in Nepal

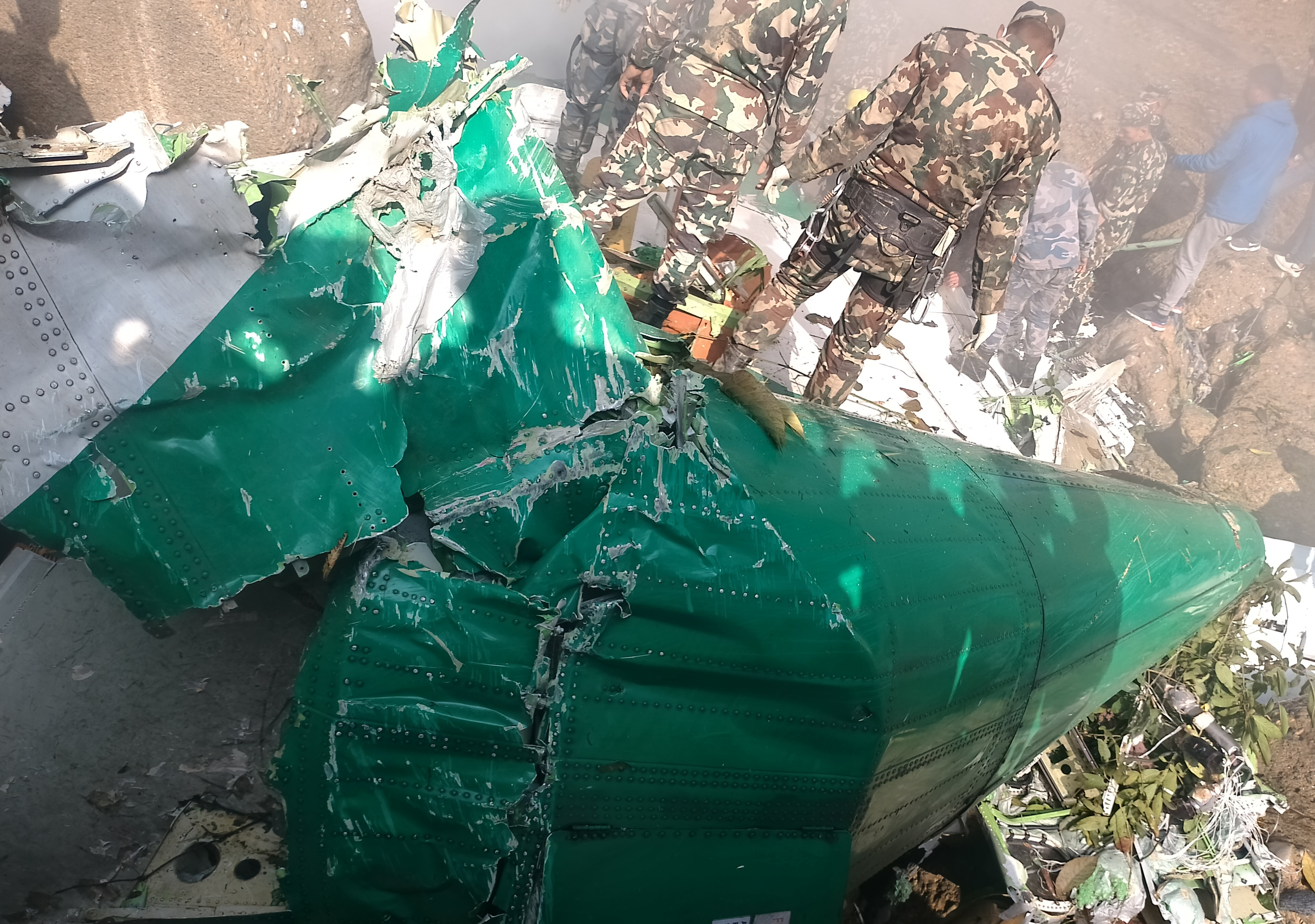
- Wreckage of the aircraft

Accident
- Date: 15 January 2023
- Summary: Crashed during approach due to accidental feathering of propellers and pilot error
- Site: Seti Gandaki River, Pokhara, Nepal

Aircraft
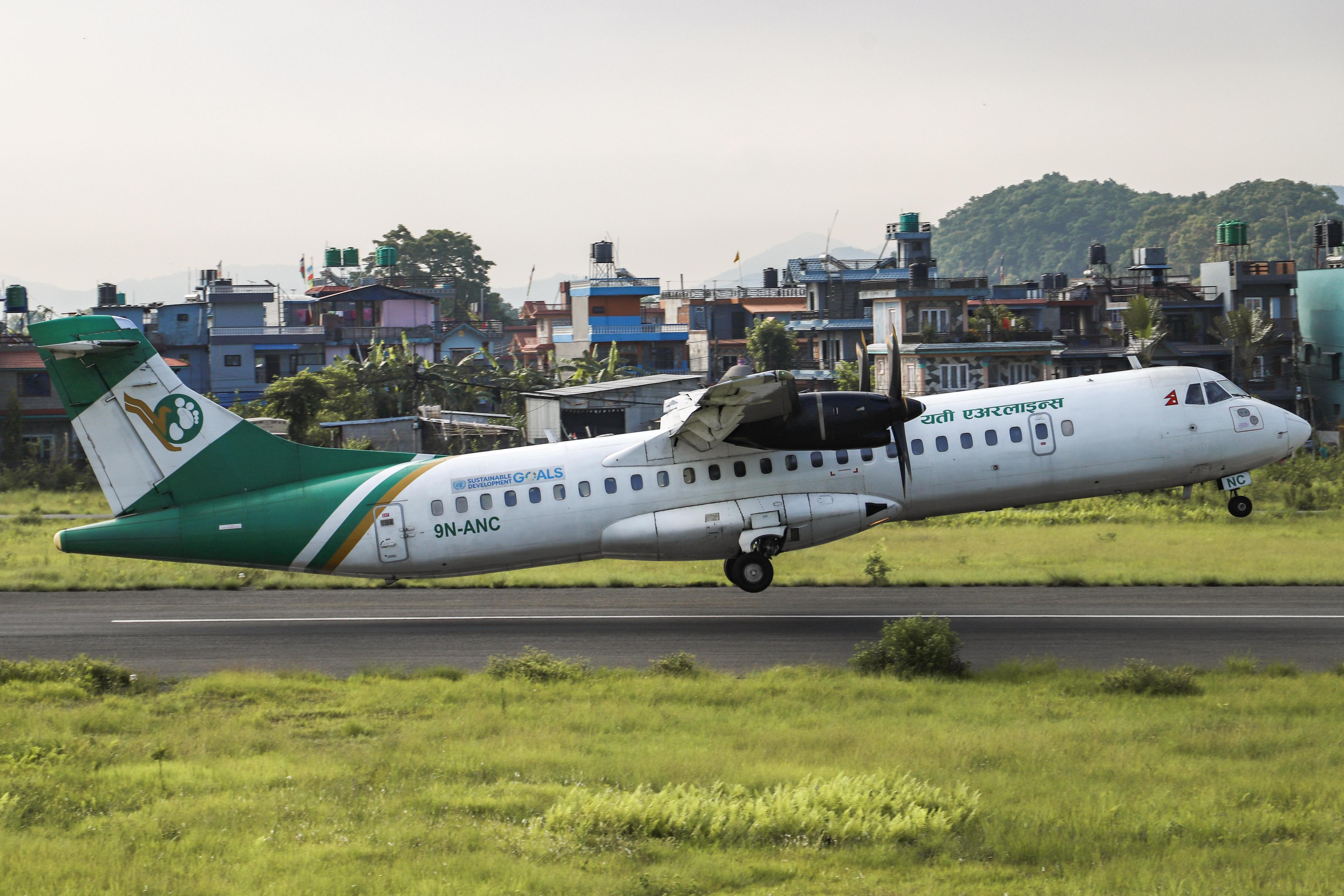
- 9N-ANC, the aircraft involved in the accident, seen in 2022
- Aircraft type: ATR 72-500
- Operator: Yeti Airlines
- IATA flight No.: YT691
- ICAO flight No.: NYT691
- Call sign: YETI AIRLINES 691
- Registration: 9N-ANC
- Flight origin: Tribhuvan International Airport, Kathmandu, Bagmati, Nepal
- Destination: Pokhara International Airport, Pokhara, Gandaki Province, Nepal
- Occupants: 72
- Passengers: 68
- Crew: 4
- Fatalities: 72
- Survivors: 0

Yeti Airlines Flight 691 was a scheduled domestic passenger flight flown by Yeti Airlines from Kathmandu to Pokhara in Nepal. On 15 January 2023, the ATR 72 being operated on the route stalled and crashed while landing at Pokhara, killing all 68 passengers and 4 crew members on board. The investigation revealed that Captain Kamal KC had accidentally feathered the engines, causing a loss of thrust.

== Accident ==
External videos
- Last moments of Flight 691, filmed from the ground.
- Video of livestream of the crash from inside the aircraft by Sonu Jaiswal

The flight took off from Kathmandu's Tribhuvan International Airport at 10:33 am NST. It crashed on the bank of the Seti Gandaki River while on final approach to landing at Pokhara International Airport. A video filmed from the ground showed the aircraft banking steeply to the left before crashing 65 metres (213 ft) away. Another video of the crash was streamed live on Facebook from inside the plane by a passenger, Sonu Jaiswal, showing that the passengers were unaware of the situation until seconds before impact.

The crash occurred in Gandaki Province between the old Pokhara Airport and the new Pokhara International Airport, which was opened two weeks earlier and also where the aircraft was intending to land. The accident resulted in the deaths of all 72 people on board, and was Nepal's worst aviation accident since the crash of Pakistan International Airlines Flight 268 in 1992, the deadliest aviation accident in Nepalese domestic aviation, and the deadliest accident involving an ATR 72.

According to an official at the Pokhara International Airport, air traffic control cleared the flight to land on runway 30 heading from east to west, but the captain requested the opposing runway 12 heading from west to east, minutes before the crash. Flight-tracking service Flightradar24 noted that during the flight the aircraft had been transmitting inaccurate speed and altitude data.

== Aircraft ==
The aircraft involved, manufactured in 2007, was a 15-year-old twin-engine turboprop ATR 72-500 registered as 9N-ANC with serial number 754. The aircraft was powered by two Pratt & Whitney Canada PW127M engines.

== Passengers and crew ==
There were 72 people on board, of which 68 were passengers and 4 were crew members. Among the passengers were 37 men, 25 women, and six children, three of whom were infants. 71 bodies were found. On 17 January, authorities began returning the victims' bodies (the majority of which were burnt beyond recognition) to their families. The United States Department of State announced that two U.S. citizens died in the crash, although Nepalese authorities did not report any American deaths.

The plane was under the command of senior captain Kamal KC with Captain Anju Khatiwada as pilot flying. Khatiwada's husband, Dipak Pokhrel, who also worked for Yeti Airlines, died in the 2006 Yeti Airlines Twin Otter crash. Nearing the runway Captain Kamal KC decided to train Captain Khatiwada on the new runway, which he had landed on twice, so the flight was being used as an unplanned opportunity for instruction.

Passengers and crew by nationality
Nationality	Passengers	Crew	Total	Ref.
Nepal	53	4	57	
India	5	0	5	
Russia	4	0	4	
South Korea	2	0	2	
Argentina	1	0	1	
Australia	1	0	1	
France	1	0	1	
United Kingdom	1	0	1	
Total	68	4	72	

== Aftermath ==
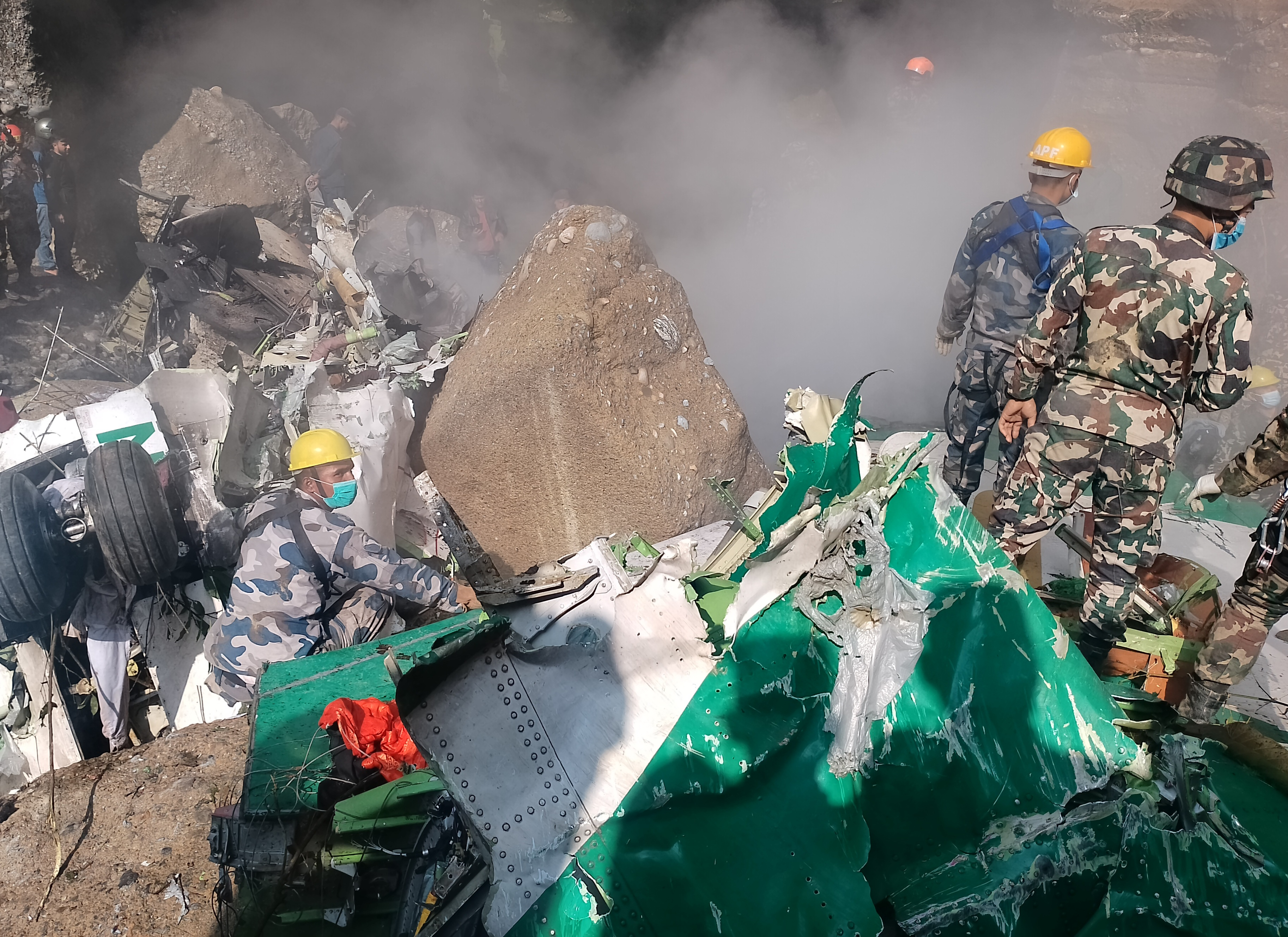
Another angle of aircraft wreckage

The airport was closed as authorities launched a rescue operation. The Government of Nepal summoned an emergency cabinet meeting following the crash. Prime Minister Pushpa Kamal Dahal said he was deeply saddened by the tragic accident. The Office of the Prime Minister declared 16 January to be a national day of mourning, and the flag of Nepal was flown at half-staff. Yeti Airlines cancelled all regular flights scheduled for the day.

== Investigation ==
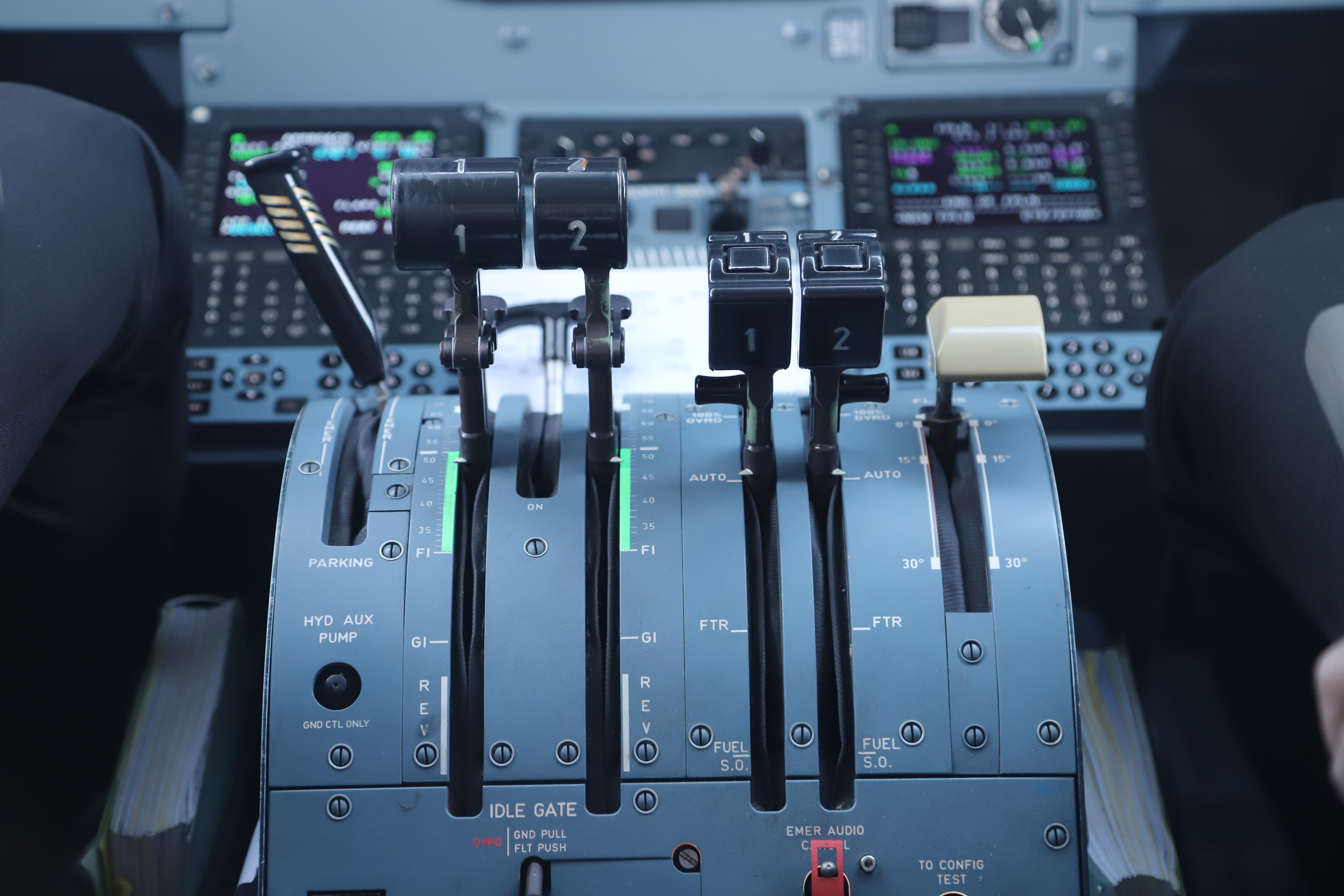
From left to right: Parking brake, power, condition, and flaps levers on the centre pedestal of an ATR 72

Experts noted that the video from the ground taken moments before the crash showed the aircraft's nose noticeably high before the left wing suddenly dropped, probably indicating a stall. Hours after the crash, a five-member committee headed by Nagendra Ghimire was set up to investigate the accident in conjunction with the French Bureau of Enquiry and Analysis for Civil Aviation Safety.

On 16 January, the flight data and cockpit voice recorders were found; the recorders were examined in Singapore and with assistance from Transportation Safety Board of Canada, Bureau of Enquiry and Analysis for Civil Aviation Safety, and Transport Safety Investigation Bureau of Singapore.

=== Preliminary report ===
About a month later, on 13 February, a preliminary report was released, which largely reproduced all relevant logs.

(PF = Pilot Flying, PM = Pilot Monitoring):

At 10:56:27, the PF disengaged the Autopilot System (AP) at an altitude of 721 feet (220 m) Above Ground Level (AGL). The PF then called for "FLAPS 30" at 10:56:32, and the PM replied, "Flaps 30 and descending". The flight data recorder (FDR) data did not record any flap surface movement at that time. Instead, the propeller rotation speed (Np) of both engines decreased simultaneously to less than 25% and the torque (Tq) started decreasing to 0%, which is consistent with both propellers going into the feathered condition [...]

The flight crew then carried out the "Before Landing Checklist" before starting the left turn onto the base leg. During that time, the power lever angle increased from 41% to 44%. At this point, the Np of both propellers was recorded as Non-Computed Data (NCD) in the FDR and the torque (Tq) of both engines was at 0%. When propellers are in feather, they are not producing thrust [...]

At 10:56:54, another click was heard, followed by the flaps surface movement to the 30 degrees position [...]

When ATC gave the clearance for landing at 10:57:07, the PF mentioned twice that there was no power coming from the engines. At 10:57:11, the power levers were advanced first to 62 degrees then to the maximum power position. At 10:57:20, the PM [...] repeated again that there was no power from the engines [...]

The aircraft's propellers had been feathered for about a minute before the crash, causing the engines to produce no thrust and leading the aircraft into a stall; the condition levers, which control the propellers, were found in the wreckage set to the feathered position. (Note: Feathering is to be only done in flight after an engine failure, to minimise drag caused by windmilling; however, neither did the FDR identify anything amiss with the engine nor did the pilot report anything relevant to ATC.) Seconds preceding the crash, the pilots discussed a total lack of power and even moved the power lever to the extreme but failed to recognize that the condition levers were incorrectly set. Speculation at the time - eventually confirmed by the Final Report's finding of probable cause - was that the Pilot Monitoring (Kamal KC) had inadvertently moved the condition levers in place of the flap lever when asked by the Pilot Flying. (Though differently shaped and operated, the three are next to each other in an ATR 72.) When, about twenty seconds later, he set the flap lever properly on his own, he failed to account for his previous mistake, implying that the landing checklist was not properly followed.

Due to the shortened final approach leg of the visual approach for runway 12, this flight - like another three days earlier - failed to achieve the stabilization criteria, which are important for a safe landing, at the gate height of 500 feet (150 m) above ground level. This led the Aircraft Accident Investigation Commission to recommend the Civil Aviation Authority of Nepal (CAAN) conduct a comprehensive study for the determination of an appropriate flight path that allows a stabilized visual approach.

On 15 March, the Government of Nepal extended by 45 days the deadline for the investigation commission's final report on the accident.

=== Final report ===
On 28 December 2023, the final report was released. It reiterated the preliminary findings that the accidental change of position of both condition levers to the feathered position resulted in the loss of thrust, leading to the aerodynamic stall and crash. It found that neither airline nor regulator had approved the approach circuit chart being used, so that the recommendations of the regulator's Safety Risk Management team had not been put into effect. Some other contributing factors were also found, mostly human errors due to a high workload, lack of appropriate technical and skill-based training, ineffective crew resource management (CRM), lack of sterile cockpit discipline, and non-compliance with standard operating procedures (SOP).

== In popular culture ==
The crash is featured in season 26, episode 8 of the Canadian documentary series Mayday, also known as Air Crash Investigation, titled "Moments from Touchdown".

== See also ==
- List of accidents and incidents involving airliners by airline (P–Z)
- List of accidents and incidents involving commercial aircraft
- List of airplane accidents in Nepal
- TransAsia Airways Flight 235
