= South Airlines Flight 8971 =

2013 aviation accident

Coordinates: 48°04′30″N 037°43′32″E

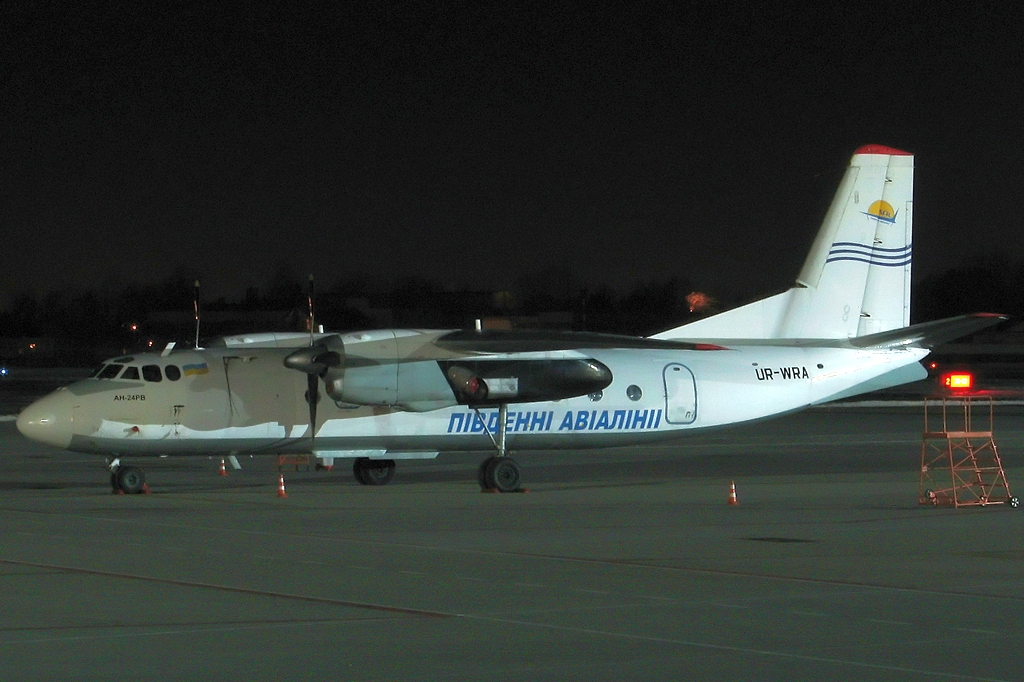
- UR-WRA, the aircraft involved, photographed a month before the accident

Accident
- Date: 13 February 2013
- Summary: Crashed next to the runway while landing in fog
- Site: Donetsk International Airport, Donetsk, Ukraine

Aircraft
- Aircraft type: Antonov An-24
- Operator: South Airlines
- IATA flight No.: YG8971
- ICAO flight No.: OTL8971
- Call sign: SOUTHLINE 8971
- Registration: UR-WRA
- Flight origin: Odesa International Airport, Ukraine
- Destination: Donetsk International Airport, Donetsk, Ukraine
- Occupants: 52
- Passengers: 44
- Crew: 8
- Fatalities: 5
- Injuries: 9
- Survivors: 47

On 13 February 2013, a Ukrainian Antonov An-24 passenger aircraft operating South Airlines flight 8971 crashed on landing at Donetsk International Airport, Ukraine, killing 5 of the 52 people on board.

== Flight Crew ==
The crew of the flight consisted of:

Captain - Sergey Nikolaevich Melashenko

First Officer - Oleg Smirnov

Flight Engineer - Roman Korol

Navigator - Sergei Xlopcev

== Accident ==
At 18:09 Kyiv Time, after an internal flight from Odesa to Donetsk, the plane missed the runway as it made a hard landing at Donetsk International Airport. Five passengers were confirmed dead. After touchdown the aircraft had burst into flames, however, most occupants were evacuated because they were able to escape from the burning aircraft through a hole in the fuselage left by the crash. Eyewitnesses have stated that the aircraft was attempting to land in dense fog and touched down on soft ground between the main runway and the taxiway, other observers reported the aircraft touched down short of the runway, on soft ground. According to flight documentation on board were 36 passengers and 7 crew members; but there were also several unregistered passengers making the total of people on board 52.

All 44 passengers were football fans on their way to the match between Shakhtar Donetsk and Borussia Dortmund. This match opened with a minute of silence in memory of the deceased.

The aircraft was built in 1973.

== Investigation ==
Donetsk Oblast Prosecutor's Officer Volodymyr Vyshynsky is in charge of the inquiry which was opened the day after the crash. On 14 February 2013 investigators considered pilot error, faulty ground support equipment and poor weather conditions as possible causes. The plane's pilot blamed bad weather for the accident; while the plane's operator, South Airlines, stated that the plane was in good condition and the pilot should not have landed in the fog and should have diverted to another airport. One passenger mentioned "engine failure during landing".

Deputy Prime Minister Oleksandr Vilkol stated that the cause for the crash was a loss of speed by the aircraft during landing approach due to an error of the unprepared crew, which had no clearance to make the flight in those weather conditions. The Ministry of Transport reported that at the Minimum Descent Altitude (MDA) the crew did not establish visual contact with the approach lights or runway, the commander then reduced the rate of descent however did not communicate a decision to go-around or continue the approach to his crew. The aircraft slowed to below the minimum control speed, rolled to 48 degrees of bank and impacted ground right wing first.
