= 2006 Yeti Airlines DHC-6 crash =

Aviation accident in Nepal

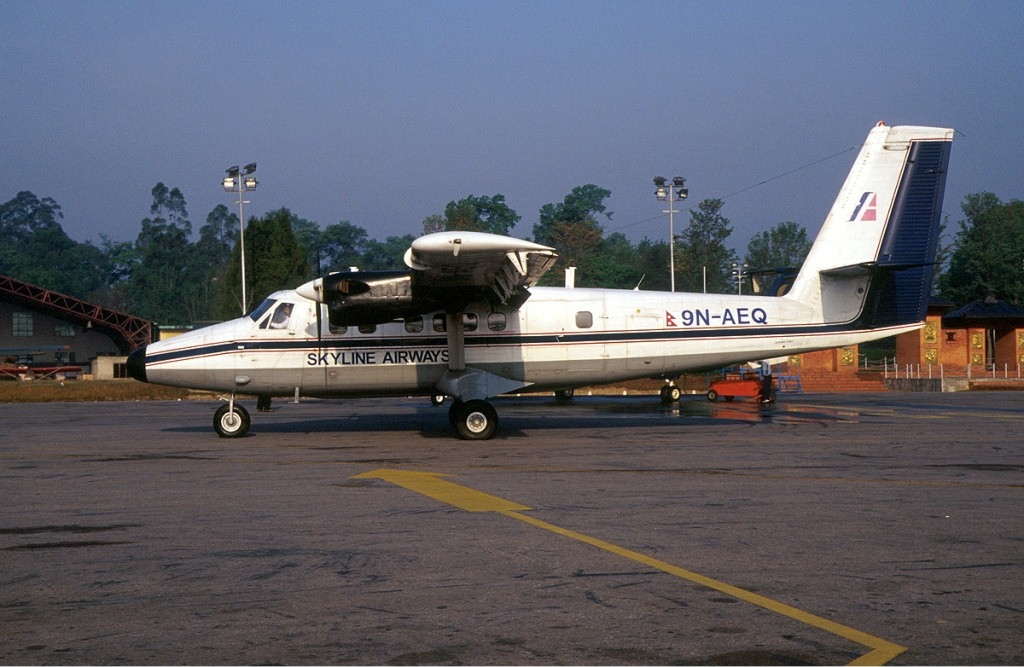
- 9N-AEQ, the aircraft involved, seen in 2001 while in operation with Skyline Airways

Accident
- Date: 21 June 2006
- Summary: Stall during a go-around
- Site: Jumla Airport, Nepal; 29°16′N 82°11′E

Aircraft
- Aircraft type: De Havilland Canada DHC-6 Twin Otter
- Operator: Yeti Airlines
- Registration: 9N-AEQ
- Flight origin: Nepalgunj Airport, Nepalgunj
- Stopover: Surkhet Airport, Surkhet/Birendranagar
- Destination: Jumla Airport, Jumla
- Occupants: 9
- Passengers: 6
- Crew: 3
- Fatalities: 9
- Survivors: 0

On 21 June 2006, when approaching Jumla Airport, Nepal, a Yeti Airlines DHC-6 Twin Otter crashed into the ground after the crew decided to abort the landing and perform a go-around for an unknown reason. Eyewitnesses said that the plane appeared to have stalled while making a tight turn on the threshold of runway 27 and ploughed into the ground in a ball of fire on the eastern edge of the runway.

== Aircraft ==
The aircraft involved in the crash was a de Havilland Canada DHC-6 Twin Otter operated by Yeti Airlines. Its maiden flight was in 1980 and first in service with Lesotho Airways. The aircraft was purchased by Yeti Airlines one year prior to the accident from another Nepalese carrier, Skyline Airways. It was the third incident of this aircraft operated by Yeti Airlines and was one of four Twin Otters in the airline's fleet.

== Crew and passengers ==
Six passengers and three crew members were on board the aircraft. All occupants on board died in the crash. The cockpit crew members were identified as Captain Krishna Malla and co-pilot Dipak Pokhrel. Pokhrel's wife, Anju Khatiwada, also died in an air crash 16 years later. She was the co-pilot of the ill-fated Yeti Airlines Flight 691 in January 2023. Her husband's death had inspired her to take up a career in aviation.
