= South Airlines =

Ukrainian charter airline

IATA	ICAO	Call sign
YG	OTL	SOUTHLINE
- Founded: 19 April 1999
- Ceased operations: 2013
- Operating bases: Odesa Airport
- Fleet size: 3
- Headquarters: Odesa, Ukraine
- Key people: Molod Yurii (Director General)
- Website: www.otlavia.com

South Airlines (Ukrainian: Південні авіалінії, Russian: Южные авиалинии) was a charter airline based in Odesa, Ukraine.

== History ==
The airline was registered in 1999 in Odesa, Ukraine. In 2000, the company was certified by the State Aviation Service of Ukraine. South Airlines operated scheduled and charter flights. In the beginning, the company operated with 6 types of aircraft: Antonov An-24, Antonov An-30, Antonov An-140, Yakovlev Yak-40, Let L-410 Turbolet and Tupolev Tu-134. The airline's license was revoked by the aviation authority in February 2013.

== Fleet ==
As of 14 February 2013, the South Airlines is reported to have had only three aircraft (excluding the An-24 lost in the 13 February air disaster in Donetsk), with types of them being an Antonov An-24RV, Embraer EMB-500, Saab 340B and Yakovlev Yak-42. The South Airlines fleet consisted of the following aircraft (as of December 2012):

Aircraft	In Fleet	Orders	Seating
Antonov An-24RV	1	0	48
Antonov An-148	0	6	n/a
Let L-410 UVP	1	0	n/a
Saab 340B	2	0	33
Yak-42D	1	0	120
Total	5	6	

== Accidents and incidents ==
- On 13 February 2013, South Airlines Flight 8971 crashed when the plane overshot the runway as it attempted an emergency landing at Donetsk International Airport. The plane then inverted and crashed, 5 died on impact while 47 survived and 9 were injured.
