= List of Qantas fatal accidents =

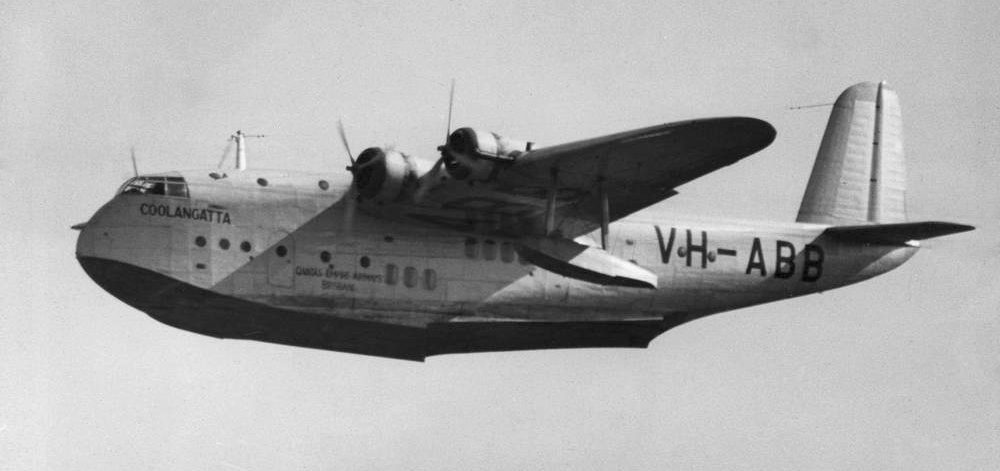
Short S.23 Empire flying boat VH-ABB, which crashed in 1944.

While Qantas has never had a fatal jet airliner accident, the Australian national airline suffered losses in its early days before the widespread adoption of jets in civilian aviation. These were mainly biplanes or flying boats servicing routes in Queensland and New Guinea. The incidents between 1942 and 1944 were during World War II, when Qantas Empire Airways operated on behalf of the military. While strictly speaking not accidents, the shootdowns of G-AETZ and G-AEUH are included for completeness. In 2014 and 2023, Qantas was rated the world's safest airline by Airline Ratings.

Date	Location	Aircraft type	Registration	Description	Total occupants	Fatalities	References
24 March 1927	Tambo, Australia	Airco (later de Havilland) DH.9C	G-AUED	Stalled at low altitude on approach to land. Pilot Alan Douglas Davidson	3	3	
4 September 1928	Adelaide Hills, Australia	de Havilland DH.50J	G-AUHI	Following a tour carrying Sir John Salmond, aircraft departed Adelaide piloted by C. W. A. Scott with engineer as passenger; lost control in cloud during attempt to cross the Adelaide Hills and aircraft crashed and caught fire killing the engineer. See C. W. A. Scott's DH.50J Hermes, fatal crash.	2	1	
3 October 1934	Near Winton, Australia	de Havilland DH.50A	VH-UHE	Crashed after in-flight loss of control, possibly stalled at low altitude in dusty low-visibility conditions.	3	3	
15 November 1934	Near Longreach, Australia	de Havilland DH.86	VH-USG	Crashed on its delivery flight from England to Brisbane after in-flight loss of control, probably due to the type's design deficiencies.	4	4	
30 January 1942	Timor Sea off Koepang	Short S.23 Empire Flying Boat	G-AEUH	Shot down by Japanese aircraft; ex-Qantas VH-ABD, owned by Imperial Airways and operated by Qantas.	18	13	
20 February 1942	Brisbane, Australia	de Havilland DH.86	VH-USE	Lost control after take-off in stormy weather, possibly broke up in flight (tail fin found a mile from the crash site).	9	9	
28 February 1942	Between Tjilatjap, Netherlands East Indies and Broome, Australia	Short S.23 Empire Flying Boat	G-AETZ	Nicknamed "Circe"; Shot down by Japanese aircraft; owned by Imperial Airways and operated by Qantas.	20	20	
22 April 1943	Gulf of Papua off Port Moresby, Papua	Short S.23 Empire Flying Boat	VH-ADU	Stalled in flare and broke up during emergency landing in open water in poor weather.	31	13	
26 November 1943	Port Moresby, Papua	Lockheed C-56B Lodestar	42-68348	Struck hill after take-off; USAAF aircraft operated by Qantas for Allied Directorate of Air Transport.	15	15	
11 October 1944	Rose Bay, Sydney, Australia	Short S.23 Empire Flying Boat	VH-ABB	On final approach with one engine shut-down, stalled 3 metres (10 ft) above the water and hull ruptured on impact.	30	2	
23 March 1946	Indian Ocean	Avro Lancastrian	G-AGLX	Aircraft disappeared between Colombo and the Cocos (Keeling) Islands, cause unknown; aircraft owned by BOAC and operated by both airlines on Sydney-London services (BOAC crews operated London-Karachi and Qantas crews Karachi-Sydney).	10	10	
16 July 1951	Huon Gulf near Lae, Papua New Guinea	de Havilland Australia DHA-3 Drover	VH-EBQ	Crashed in sea after centre propeller failure, in heavy rain half a mile from the coast. Cargo of gold doré bars worth £36,000 (A$1.7 million 2022) was never found.	7	7	
21 September 1951	11 kilometres (6.8 mi) southeast of Arona in the central highlands of New Guinea	de Havilland DH.84 Dragon	VH-AXL	Crashed in mountainous country, no passengers aboard	1	1	
13 December 1951	Near Mount Hagen, central highlands of New Guinea	de Havilland DH.84 Dragon	VH-URV	Crashed in mountainous country	3	3	

== See also ==
- Qantas Flight 1
- List of accidents and incidents involving airliners by airline
