= Qantas Flight 1 =

1999 runway excursion accident in Bangkok, Thailand

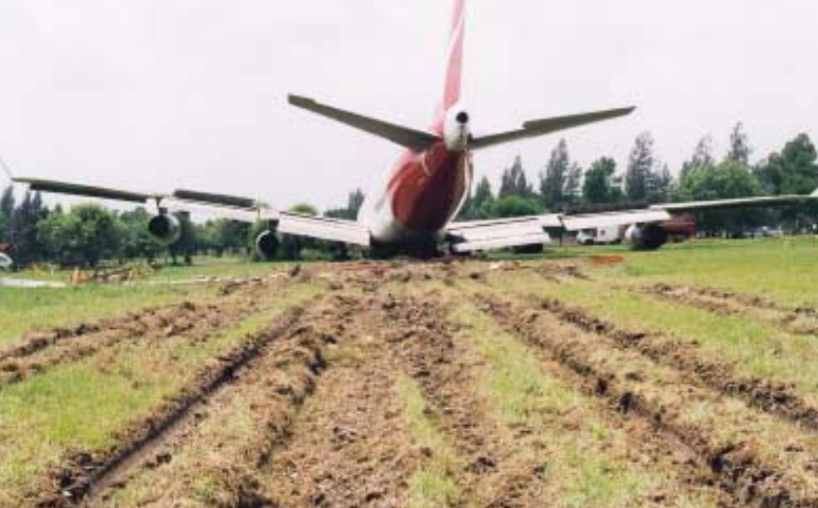
- City of Darwin seen after event

Accident
- Date: 23 September 1999
- Summary: Runway overrun caused by hydroplaning
- Site: Don Mueang International Airport, Bangkok, Thailand; 13.927333°N 100.617056°E

Aircraft
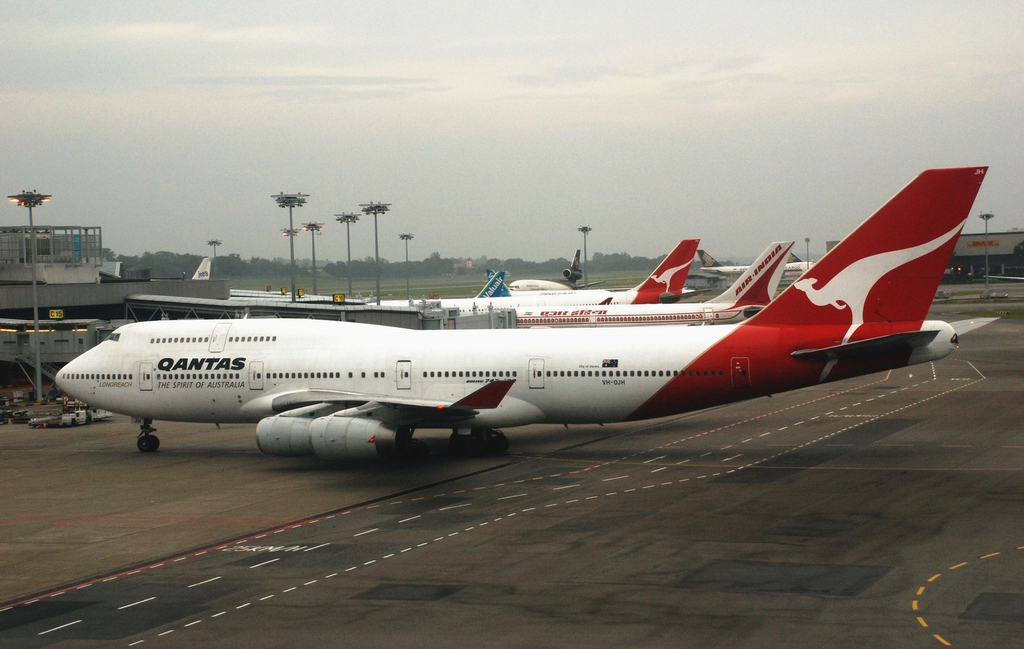
- VH-OJH, the aircraft involved in the accident, seen in 2008, 8 years after the incident.
- Aircraft type: Boeing 747-438
- Aircraft name: City of Darwin
- Operator: Qantas
- IATA flight No.: QF1
- ICAO flight No.: QFA1
- Call sign: QANTAS 1
- Registration: VH-OJH
- Flight origin: Sydney Airport, Sydney, Australia
- Stopover: Don Mueang International Airport, Bangkok, Thailand
- Destination: Heathrow Airport, London, England
- Occupants: 410
- Passengers: 391
- Crew: 19
- Fatalities: 0
- Injuries: 38
- Survivors: 410

Qantas Flight 1 (QF1/QFA1) was a Qantas passenger flight between Sydney and London with a stop in Bangkok-Don Mueang. On 23 September 1999, the Boeing 747-400 operating as Flight 1 had departed from Sydney that day, and was involved in a runway overrun accident at Don Mueang International Airport in Bangkok as it was landing for a stopover.

== Flight ==
Qantas flights travel between London and Australia on a route known as the "Kangaroo Route". The Kangaroo Route traditionally refers to air routes flown between Australia and the United Kingdom, via the Eastern Hemisphere.

This flight was operated by Senior Check Captain Stone Loberg in Boeing 747-438 registered VH-OJH. The flight departed Sydney earlier that day at 16:45 local time, and after more than eight hours of flight time, was approaching Don Mueang International Airport at 22:45 local time.

== Accident ==
During the approach to Bangkok, the weather conditions deteriorated significantly, from 5 statute mile visibility half an hour before landing to approximately one half statute mile visibility at the time of landing. The flight crew observed a storm cloud over the airport and ground reports were that it was raining heavily. However, these conditions are common at Bangkok. Seven minutes prior to Flight 1's landing, a Thai Airways Airbus A330 landed normally, but three minutes before Flight 1's landing another Qantas Boeing 747 (QF15, a Sydney-Rome via Bangkok service), conducted a go-around due to poor visibility during final approach. The crew of Qantas Flight 1, however, were unaware of this.

The first officer was flying the aircraft during the final approach. The aircraft's altitude and airspeed were high, but were within company limits. The rain was now heavy enough that the runway lights were visible only intermittently after each windscreen wiper stroke. Just before touchdown the captain, concerned about the long touchdown point (over 3,000 feet [910 m] past the runway threshold) and unable to see the end of the runway, ordered the first officer to perform a "go-around" and the first officer advanced the throttles but did not engage the takeoff/go-around switch (TO/GA). At this point, visibility improved markedly and the landing gear contacted the runway, although the aircraft continued to accelerate. The captain then decided to cancel the go-around by retarding the thrust levers, even though he was not flying the aircraft. This caused confusion as he did not announce his actions to the first officer who still had formal control. When over-riding the first officer's actions, the captain inadvertently left one engine at TO/GA power and as a result cancelled the preselected auto-brake settings.

The landing continued, but manual braking did not commence until the aircraft was over 5,200 feet (1,600 m) down the runway. The aircraft then began to aquaplane and skid its way down the runway, departing substantially from the runway centreline. Company standard operating procedures mandated that idle reverse thrust should be used for landings and that flaps should be set at 25 degrees, not the maximum of 30 degrees. The combination of flaps 25, no auto-braking, no reverse thrust, a high and fast approach, a late touchdown, poor cockpit resource management, and the standing water on the runway led to a runway overshoot.

The aircraft gradually decelerated, ran off the end of the runway over a stretch of boggy grassland, colliding with a ground radio antenna as it did so, and came to rest with its nose resting on the perimeter road. The ground on the other side of the road forms part of a golf course.

There were no significant passenger injuries during an orderly evacuation of the aircraft carried out some 20 minutes after the rough landing. Thirty-eight passengers reported minor injuries.

=== Damage ===
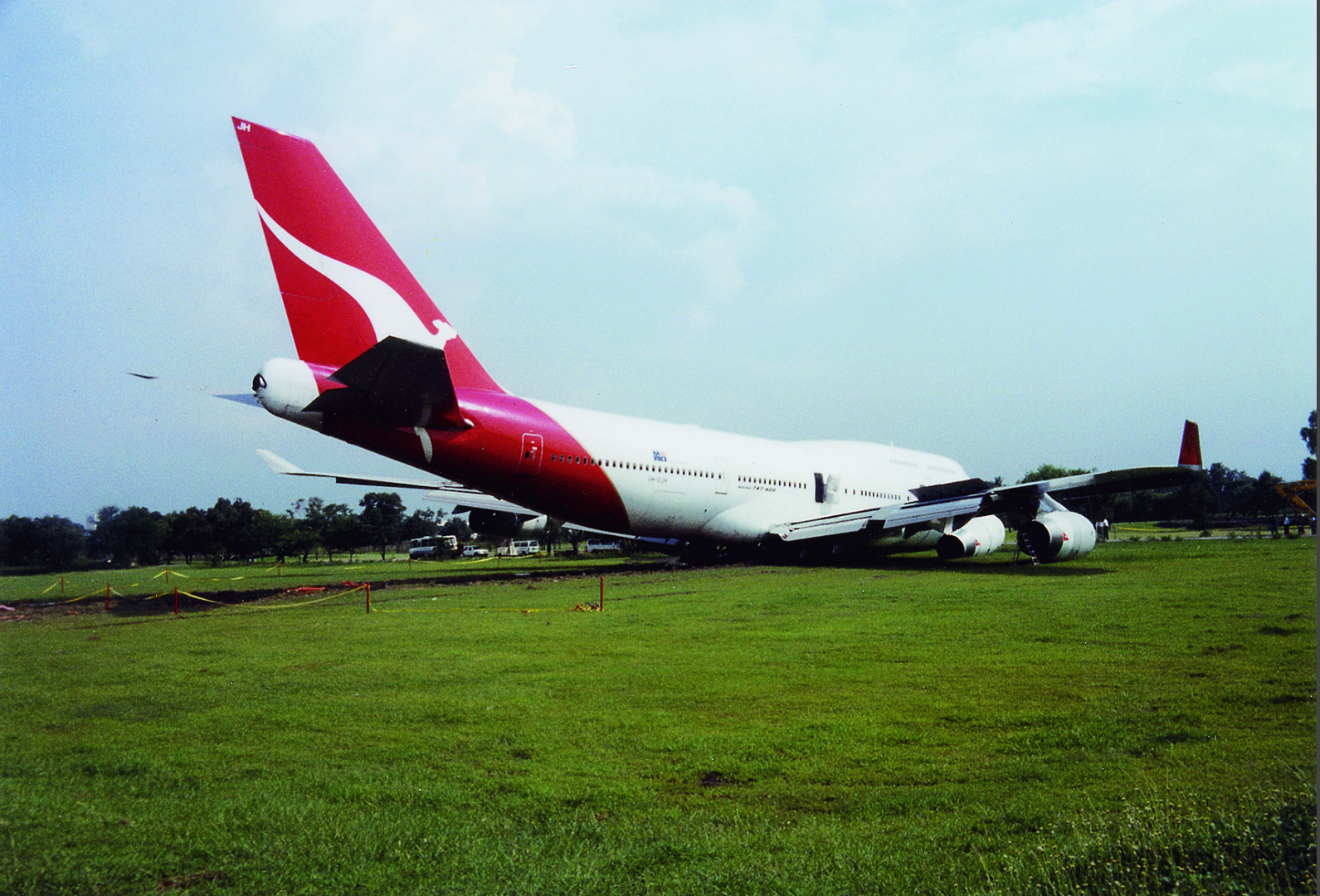
Qantas Flight 1 seen after event (another view)

The collision with the antenna caused the nose and right wing landing gear to collapse, the nose landing gear being forced back into the fuselage. The aircraft slid along in a nose-down, right wing low attitude, causing some further damage to the nose and damage to the two right engines and their mountings. The intrusion of the nose landing gear also caused the failure of the cabin intercom and public address system.

The damage was such that the aircraft was initially a write-off, but to preserve its reputation Qantas had it repaired at a cost of approximately AU$100 million (the exact figure was never disclosed by Qantas). Returning the aircraft to service enabled Qantas to retain its record of having no hull-loss accidents since the advent of the Jet Age. (Note: There have been several fatal crashes of Qantas aircraft, all of them propeller-driven. As of January 2018, the last fatal Qantas aircraft crash was in 1951 and the last Qantas aircraft to be a total loss was a Lockheed L-1049G Super Constellation propeller airliner that was destroyed by fire on 25 August 1960 in another runway overrun accident, after one of its engines failed during takeoff on the island of Mauritius.)

== The aircraft ==
The aircraft, S/N 24806, was delivered new to Qantas in August 1990 and registered VH-OJH; it was withdrawn from use in September 2012 and broken up at Pinal Airpark in 2014 for parts. (Note: The aircraft involved in the accident was a Boeing 747-400. Boeing would assign a customer code for each company that buys one of its aircraft, which is applied as a suffix to the model number at the time the aircraft is built, hence "747-438" denotes a 747-400 built for Qantas.)

== See also ==
- Runway safety area
- Engineered materials arrestor system
- Scandinavian Airlines System Flight 901
- China Eastern Airlines Flight 5398
- Sky Lease Cargo Flight 4854
- Air France Flight 358

== Bibliography ==
- Australian Transport Safety Bureau report on the accident
