= Stepanovsky =

Stepanovsky (Russian: Степановский; masculine), Stepanovskaya (Степановская; feminine), or Stepanovskoye (Степановское; neuter) is the name of several rural localities in Russia.

== Modern localities ==
=== Arkhangelsk Oblast ===
As of 2014, twelve rural localities in Arkhangelsk Oblast bear this name:

Arkhangelsk Oblast distribution map
Distribution of the inhabited localities called Stepanovskaya in Arkhangelsk Oblast.

- Stepanovskaya, Kotlassky District, Arkhangelsk Oblast, a village in Zabelinsky Selsoviet of Kotlassky District; 61°23′N 46°23′E
- Stepanovskaya, Alexeyevsky Selsoviet, Krasnoborsky District, Arkhangelsk Oblast, a village in Alexeyevsky Selsoviet of Krasnoborsky District; 61°35′N 45°49′E
- Stepanovskaya, Belosludsky Selsoviet, Krasnoborsky District, Arkhangelsk Oblast, a village in Belosludsky Selsoviet of Krasnoborsky District; 61°37′N 45°54′E
- Stepanovskaya, Lyakhovsky Selsoviet, Krasnoborsky District, Arkhangelsk Oblast, a village in Lyakhovsky Selsoviet of Krasnoborsky District; 61°51′N 45°12′E
- Stepanovskaya, Plesetsky District, Arkhangelsk Oblast, a village in Kenoretsky Selsoviet of Plesetsky District; 62°06′N 38°52′E
- Stepanovskaya, Primorsky District, Arkhangelsk Oblast, a village in Koskogorsky Selsoviet of Primorsky District; 64°21′N 41°20′E
- Stepanovskaya, Tarnyansky Selsoviet, Shenkursky District, Arkhangelsk Oblast, a village in Tarnyansky Selsoviet of Shenkursky District; 62°06′N 42°26′E
- Stepanovskaya, Verkhopadengsky Selsoviet, Shenkursky District, Arkhangelsk Oblast, a village in Verkhopadengsky Selsoviet of Shenkursky District; 61°54′N 42°05′E
- Stepanovskaya, Nizhnetoyemsky Selsoviet, Verkhnetoyemsky District, Arkhangelsk Oblast, a village in Nizhnetoyemsky Selsoviet of Verkhnetoyemsky District; 62°22′N 44°16′E
- Stepanovskaya, Novovershinsky Selsoviet, Verkhnetoyemsky District, Arkhangelsk Oblast, a village in Novovershinsky Selsoviet of Verkhnetoyemsky District; 61°57′N 45°52′E
- Stepanovskaya, Vyysky Selsoviet, Verkhnetoyemsky District, Arkhangelsk Oblast, a village in Vyysky Selsoviet of Verkhnetoyemsky District; 62°57′N 46°37′E
- Stepanovskaya, Vinogradovsky District, Arkhangelsk Oblast, a village in Zaostrovsky Selsoviet of Vinogradovsky District; 62°36′N 43°30′E

=== Kaluga Oblast ===
As of 2014, two rural localities in Kaluga Oblast bear this name:

- Stepanovskoye, Ferzikovsky District, Kaluga Oblast, a village in Ferzikovsky District
- Stepanovskoye, Medynsky District, Kaluga Oblast, a village in Medynsky District

=== Kirov Oblast ===
As of 2014, one rural locality in Kirov Oblast bears this name:

Kirov Oblast location map
Location of Stepanovskaya in Kirov Oblast

- Stepanovskaya, Kirov Oblast, a village in Ichetovkinsky Rural Okrug of Afanasyevsky District; 58°52′N 53°09′E

=== Komi Republic ===
As of 2014, one rural locality in the Komi Republic bears this name:

Komi Republic location map
Location of Stepanovskaya in the Komi Republic

- Stepanovskaya, Komi Republic, a village in Zamezhnaya Selo Administrative Territory of Ust-Tsilemsky District; 64°58′N 51°53′E

=== Moscow Oblast ===
As of 2014, two rural localities in Moscow Oblast bear this name:

Moscow Oblast distribution map
Distribution of the inhabited localities called Stepanovskoye in Moscow Oblast.

- Stepanovskoye, Krasnogorsky District, Moscow Oblast, a village in Ilyinskoye Rural Settlement of Krasnogorsky District; 55°46′N 37°09′E
- Stepanovskoye, Ramensky District, Moscow Oblast, a selo in Ulyaninskoye Rural Settlement of Ramensky District; 55°18′N 38°25′E

=== Nizhny Novgorod Oblast ===
As of 2014, one rural locality in Nizhny Novgorod Oblast bears this name:

Nizhny Novgorod Oblast location map
Location of Stepanovskoye in Nizhny Novgorod Oblast

- Stepanovskoye, Nizhny Novgorod Oblast, a village in Pakalevsky Selsoviet of Tonkinsky District; 57°16′N 45°58′E

=== Orenburg Oblast ===
As of 2014, one rural locality in Orenburg Oblast bears this name:

- Stepanovsky (rural locality), a khutor in Stepanovsky Selsoviet of Orenburgsky District

=== Vologda Oblast ===
As of 2014, seven rural localities in Vologda Oblast bear this name:

- Stepanovskoye, Vologda Oblast, a village in Sheybukhtovsky Selsoviet of Mezhdurechensky District
- Stepanovskaya, Kirillovsky District, Vologda Oblast, a village in Lipovsky Selsoviet of Kirillovsky District
- Stepanovskaya, Ozeretsky Selsoviet, Tarnogsky District, Vologda Oblast, a village in Ozeretsky Selsoviet of Tarnogsky District
- Stepanovskaya, Verkhnekokshengsky Selsoviet, Tarnogsky District, Vologda Oblast, a village in Verkhnekokshengsky Selsoviet of Tarnogsky District
- Stepanovskaya, Vozhegodsky District, Vologda Oblast, a village in Maryinsky Selsoviet of Vozhegodsky District
- Stepanovskaya, Kemsky Selsoviet, Vytegorsky District, Vologda Oblast, a village in Kemsky Selsoviet of Vytegorsky District
- Stepanovskaya, Semenovsky Selsoviet, Vytegorsky District, Vologda Oblast, a village in Semenovsky Selsoviet of Vytegorsky District

=== Yaroslavl Oblast ===
As of 2014, one rural locality in Yaroslavl Oblast bears this name:

- Stepanovskoye, Yaroslavl Oblast, a village in Volzhsky Rural Okrug of Rybinsky District

== Alternative names ==
- Stepanovsky, alternative name of Stepanovka, a village in Uvalo-Yadrinsky Rural Okrug of Lyubinsky District in Omsk Oblast; 55°26′N 72°51′E
- Stepanovsky, alternative name of Syuren, a khutor in Uralsky Selsoviet of Kugarchinsky District in the Republic of Bashkortostan; 52°48′N 56°55′E
- Stepanovskaya, alternative name of Stepanovskaya Bolshaya, a village in Peschansky Selsoviet of Kotlassky District in Arkhangelsk Oblast; 61°26′N 46°24′E
- Stepanovskaya, alternative name of Stepankovskaya, a village in Pakshengsky Selsoviet of Velsky District in Arkhangelsk Oblast; 61°19′N 42°05′E
- Stepanovskaya, alternative name of Zarechye, a village in Savvinskoye Rural Settlement of Yegoryevsky District in Moscow Oblast; 55°26′N 39°10′E
