= Saratov Airlines =

Russian airline

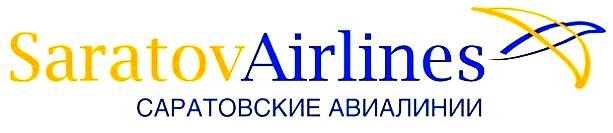
IATA	ICAO	Call sign
6W	SOV	SARATOV AIR
- Founded: 1931 (as Saratov Air Enterprise of Aeroflot)
- Ceased operations: 30 May 2018
- Hubs: Krasnoyarsk–Yemelyanovo; Saratov
- Focus cities: Chita–Kadala; Moscow–Domodedovo; Ulan-Ude–Baikal
- Fleet size: 8
- Destinations: 21
- Headquarters: Saratov, Russia
- Key people: Alexei Vakhromeev, Director
- Website: saratovairlines.ru

Saratov Airlines (Saratov Airlines Joint Stock Company, Russian: Саратовские авиалинии, Saratovskiye avialinii) was a Russian airline headquartered in Saratov and based at Saratov Tsentralny Airport. The company ceased operating on 30 May 2018 after the Russian aviation authority refused to renew its operating certificate due to the crash of Saratov Airlines Flight 703.

== History ==
Saratov Airlines was founded in 1931. It was called "Saratov United Air Squad" and was a part of Aeroflot. Until late 2013 the airline was branded Saravia (Russian: Саравиа).

In December 2013, Saratov Airlines became the first Russian operator of Embraer E-Jets, with the arrival of two Embraer 195 aircraft.

On 14 October 2015, the Russian aviation authorities sanctioned Saratov Airlines after a violation of security rules. The airline was therefore no longer allowed to operate flights to destinations outside of Russia from 26 October 2015. However, by May 2016 the airline had resumed international charter services.

In July 2017, it was announced that the airline had signed a letter of intent to lease six Irkut MC-21-300s at the MAKS Air Show in Moscow scheduled to be delivered from 2022 to 2025.

On 20 March 2018, the Russian Ministry of Transport ordered the suspension of all Saratov Airline flights following the investigation into the crash of Flight 703. The airline responded with a message on its website stating that it "continues to carry out flights on Embraer-190 and Yak-42 aircraft". Later in the day it emerged that the Ministry of Transport had shortened the period of validity of the airline's operating certificate to 27 April 2018. On 2 April the Russian aviation authority called on the airline to voluntarily cease operating due to its management's "unprecedented and irresponsible" attitude towards ensuring the safety of passengers and crew. One of the reasons for this reaction was the airline's submission of a list of current planes and crew which included the aircraft that crashed and crew members who died in February.

On 10 April 2018, it was announced that Saratov Airlines planned to re-brand itself as Ivolga Airlines. The reasons for this action are various: some experts say this is due to the air crash that occurred in February, by taking the idea from S7 Airlines and Nordavia, that re-branded after air crashes in 2006 and 2009, respectively; some experts say that it is because the airline now flies from hubs other than Saratov, such as Moscow-Domodedovo and Krasnoyarsk-Yemelyanovo. However, the envisioned rebranding never took place.

On 17 May 2018, the Russian aviation authority ordered the airline to stop selling tickets by the end of May. Initially, the company stated that it would permanently cease operations on 31 May. However, later it removed this information from its website, resumed selling tickets, and told the media that it expects its operating certificate to be re-issued no later than 27 May. This however, did not happen and the airline ceased all flights and ticket sales on 30 May 2018. The airline also operated its main hub of Saratov Tsentralny Airport, the only airport in the Saratov Oblast, which ceased operations in 2019 with the opening of the new Saratov Gagarin Airport.

== Destinations ==
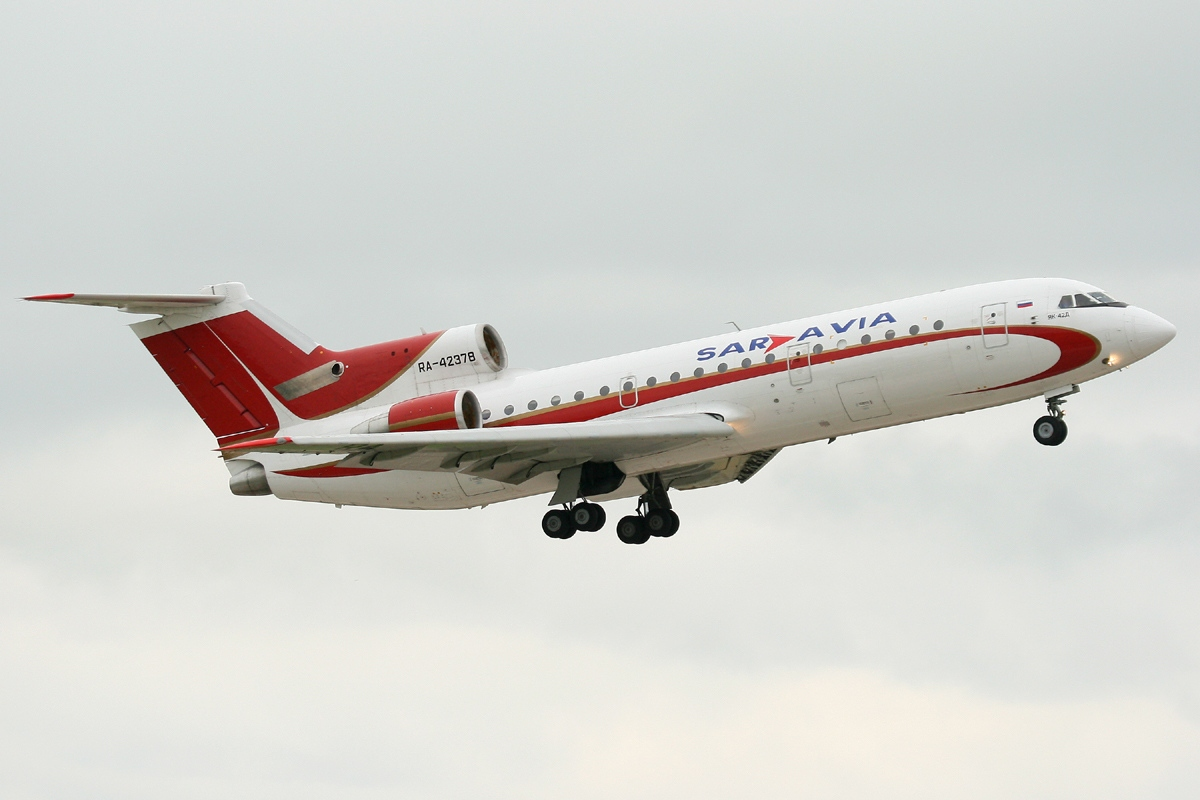
Former Saravia Yakovlev Yak-42D

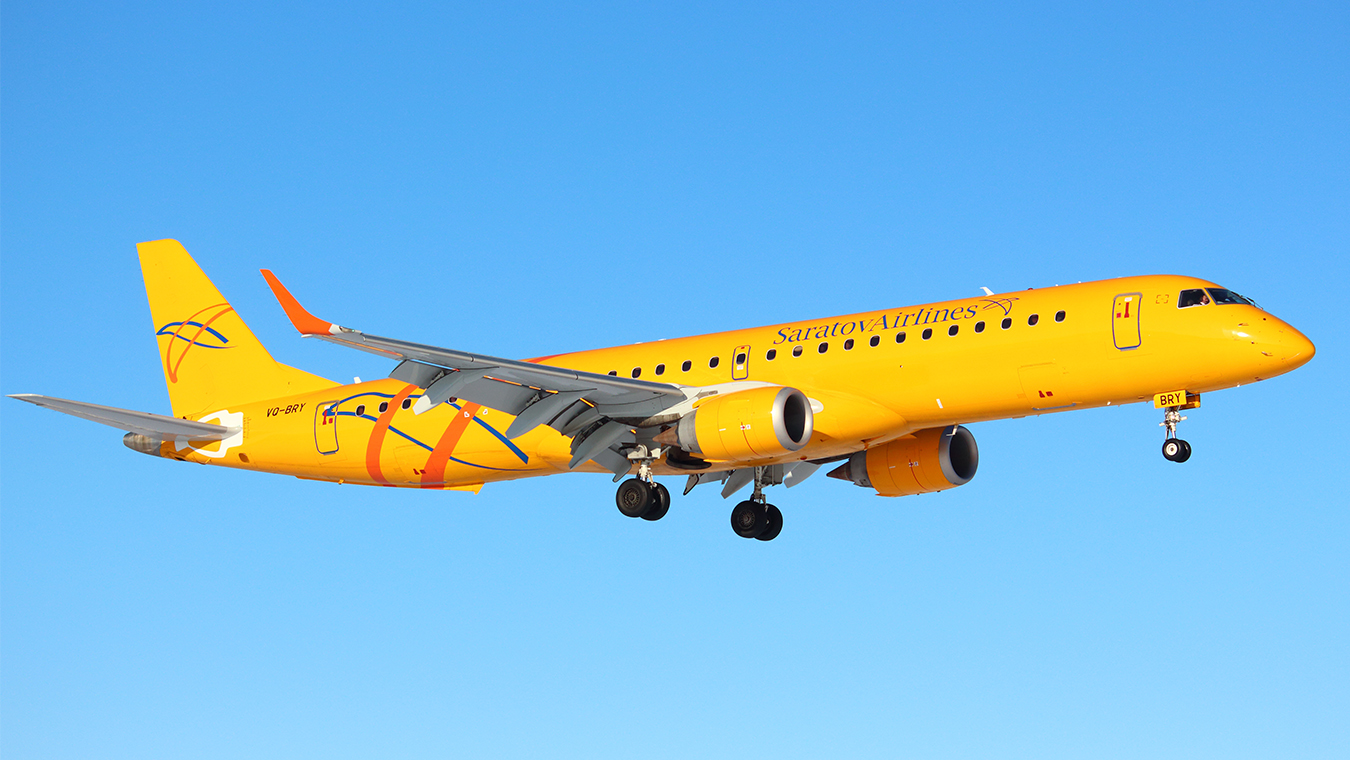
Saratov Airlines Embraer 195

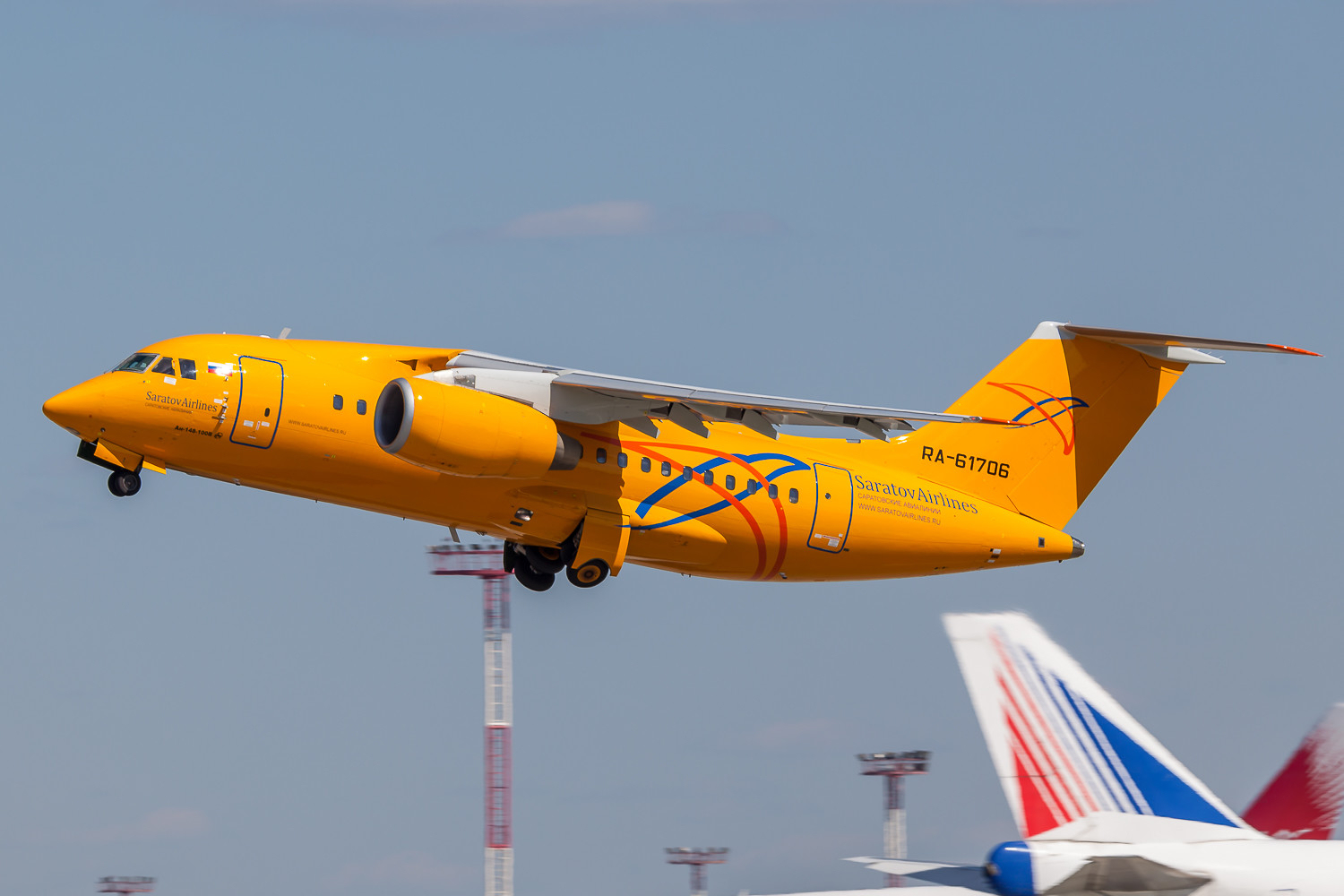
Saratov Airlines Antonov An-148

As of May 2018, Saratov Airlines operated the following domestic scheduled and international charter passenger flights:

Armenia

- Yerevan – Zvartnots International Airport

Georgia

- Tbilisi – Tbilisi International Airport

Russia

- Blagoveshensk – Ignatyevo Airport
- Chita – Kadala Airport
- Irkutsk – International Airport Irkutsk
- Kirov – Pobedilovo Airport
- Krasnodar – Pashkovsky Airport
- Krasnoyarsk – Yemelyanovo International Airport base
- Mineralnye Vody – Mineralnye Vody Airport
- Moscow – Moscow Domodedovo Airport
- Nizhnevartovsk – Nizhnevartovsk Airport
- Nizhny Novgorod – Strigino Airport
- Orsk – Orsk Airport
- Saint Petersburg – Pulkovo Airport
- Saratov – Saratov Tsentralny Airport base
- Simferopol – Simferopol International Airport
- Surgut – Surgut International Airport seasonal charter
- Ufa – Ufa International Airport
- Ulan-Ude – Baikal International Airport
- Vladivostok – Vladivostok International Airport
- Volgograd – Gumrak Airport
- Yekaterinburg – Koltsovo Airport

== Fleet ==
As of May 2018, shortly before Saratov Airlines ceased operations, the fleet included the following aircraft:

Saratov Airlines
Aircraft	In Service	Orders	Passengers			Notes
Aircraft	In Service	Orders	C	Y	Total	Notes
Antonov An-148-100	1	—	—	83	83	Leased from Rossiya Airlines and grounded
Boeing 737-800	—	1	TBA			Was planned to be leased from GECAS and to be delivered in 2019
Embraer 195	2	2	10	104	114	Two operated at closure, two further deliveries received in April and May 2018 but never taken into service
Yakovlev Yak-42	5	—	16	84	100	Were to be phased out by August 2019
Yakovlev Yak-42	5	—	—	120	120	Were to be phased out by August 2019
Total	8	3				

== Incidents and accidents ==
- 20 November 1993: Avioimpex Flight 110, a Yakovlev Yak-42 operated by Saratov Airlines, crashed on approach to Ohrid Airport in Macedonia, killing all 116 on board.
- 11 February 2018: Saratov Airlines Flight 703, an Antonov An-148, disappeared from radar and crashed less than ten minutes after takeoff. The flight, operated using an An-148 and scheduled to depart from Moscow's Domodedovo airport to the Russian city of Orsk, had 71 people on board; 65 passengers and six crew members. The crash occurred near the village of Stepanovskoye about 50 miles southeast of Moscow. No one on board survived the plane crash. This would result in the airline ceasing operations after its AOC was revoked.
