= Orenburg shawl =

Russian knitted lace textile

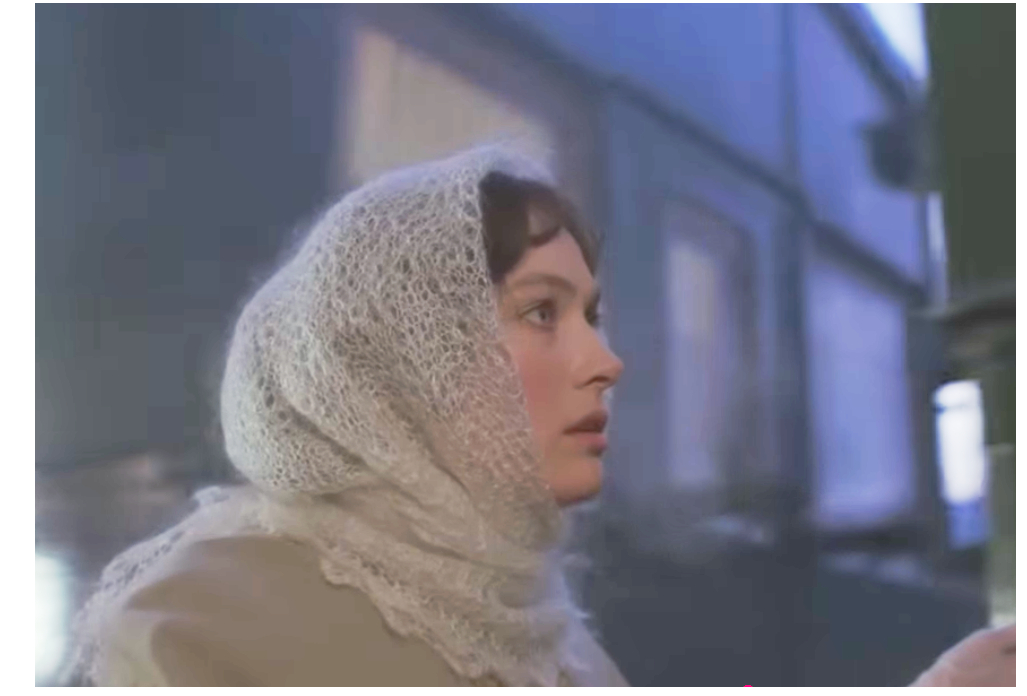
Orenburg shawl as worn by Larissa (played by Larisa Guzeyeva) in the Soviet film "A Cruel Romance"

The Orenburg shawl is a Russian knitted lace textile using goat down and stands as one of the classic symbols of Russian handicraft, along with Tula samovars, the Matrioshka doll, Khokhloma painting, Gzhel ceramics, the Palekh miniature, Vologda lace, Dymkovo toys, Rostov finift (enamel), and Ural malachite.

== Origins ==
This type of finely knit, down-hair lace shawl originated in the Orenburg area about 250 years ago, in the 18th century. The Orenburg region of Russia is famous for its shawls, known as Orenburg shawls/scarves/ "Orenburgskyi Platok" in Russian. In the English-speaking world, they are often called "wedding ring shawls" because, although the shawls are quite large, a shawl knit in the traditional fashion is so fine that it can be pulled through a wedding ring.

== Composition ==
The shawls are made from a blend of silk and indigenous goat fiber, similar to cashmere or mohair. Harsh climate and the specific features of the area created perfect conditions for successful breeding of the Guberlinskoy breed that has a light, warm, soft, silky and long-fiber fluff.

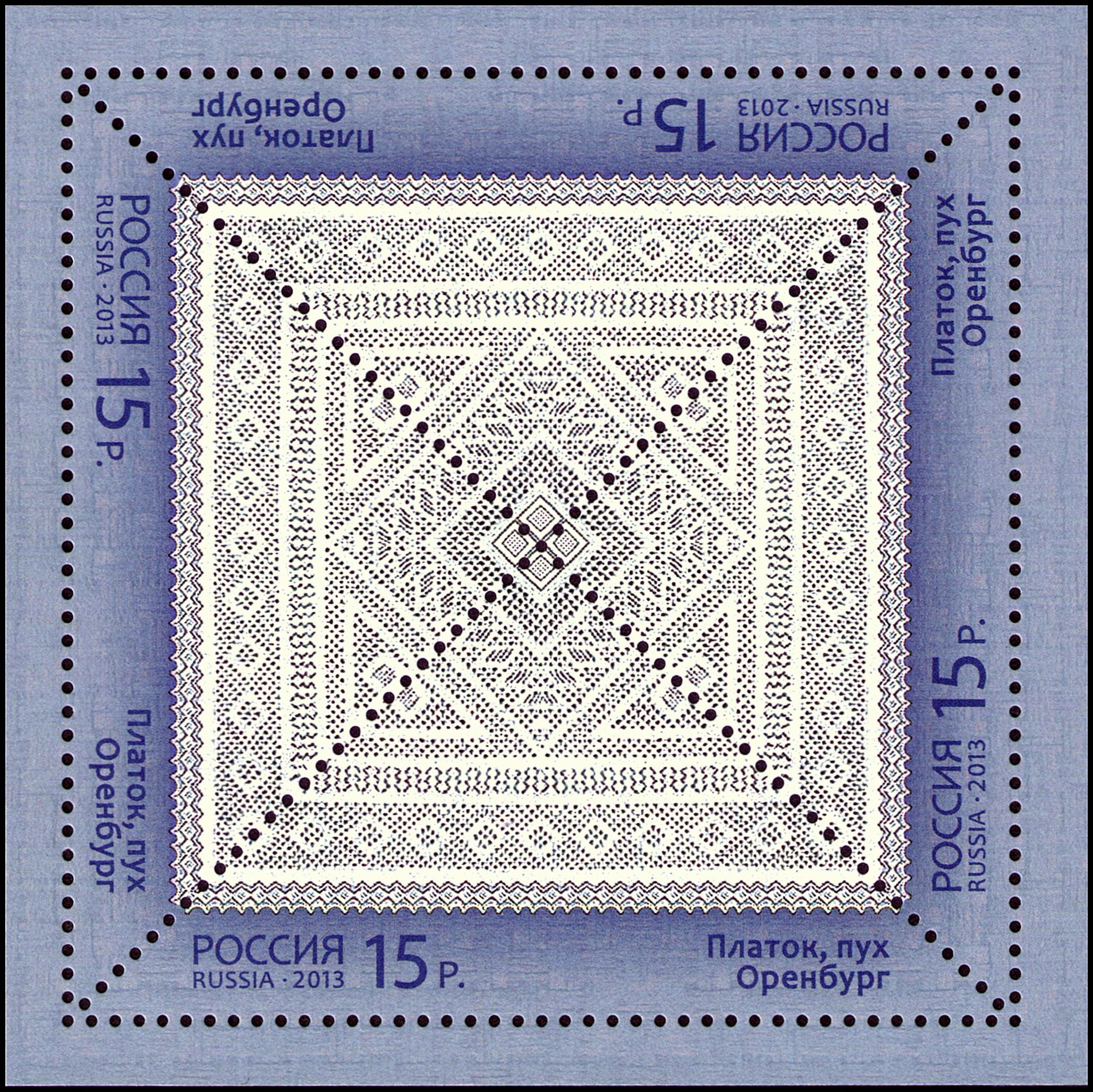
The pattern of the Orenburg shawl on the postage stamp. Russian Post, 2013.

This particular type of wool is exclusively peculiar to this breed. The goats are brushed each spring to collect the fiber. Each goat gives off about a pound of fiber. The fiber is then handspun using a supported spindle. It is then plied against a commercial silk thread. The silk helps hold the shape of the lace, preventing it from needing to be blocked as often as it would without the silk. Originally the shawls were made entirely of goat fiber, but this changed. By plying with one silk single and one goat, the price of the shawls decreased, because the labor required to produce a shawl decreased. The silk also increased the strength of the shawl.

== Shawls ==
After the yarn has been spun and plied, the shawl is then knitted before washing the yarn. The yarn and fiber are not washed until the shawl has been knitted and is ready for blocking and sale. The shawls are knitted into a variety of geometric designs. The shawls are made in many shapes: rectangular, square and triangular. The size varies from a 5 ft by 5 ft square shawls to a headscarf-sized ones. Color varies depending on the coloring of the goats. Some shawls contain more than one color.

== Qualities ==
The down hair of Orenburg goats is among the thinnest in the world – 16-18 micrometers (angora rabbit fiber is 14-17 micrometers and muskox quiviut is 11-17 micrometers). Products made of Orenburg down hair are therefore especially soft and fine. The thinness of hair is partly due to the severe snowy winters of the Ural mountain steppes, along with particular qualities of feed and living conditions. The Orenburg goat breed can be reared only in the Orenburg region. Despite being so fine, the fiber is very durable, more so than wool. The efforts of the French in the 19th century to import Orenburg goats were unsuccessful, as the warm climate of France was not suitable for the development of the fine down hair. Accordingly, Orenburg goats in France degenerated into ordinary goats with rough thick down hair. In the 18th and 19th centuries, France imported tens of thousands of poods (пуд) (an old Russian measure of weight equal to about 36 pounds) of Orenburg goat down hair, which was valued more highly than cashmere. The Orenburg shawl became popular in Europe through an enterprise “Imitation a la Orenburg” organized by an English firm “Lipner”.

== 20th century ==
In the 20th century, the wars and the Iron Curtain of the Soviet Era cut short the epoch of the worldwide fame of Orenburg’s handicraft. However, it did not mean the end of down-knitting handicraft in the region. One of the innovations introduced at that time was the combined use of down wool of both Orenburg and Volgograd goats. The local knitters realised the down of Volgograd goats was very good for knitting white shawls. Another achievement was the foundation of the Orenburg Downy Shawls Plant. Again, as in the 19th century, Orenburg shawls attracted attention, this time within the limits of the USSR. It was considered inappropriate to return from Orenburg without a downy shawl. Western Europe is still buying large quantities of Orenburg goat down hair.

== Variations ==
The “web” like structure of the shawl endows the fabric with a special grace. Even though the shawl is large in size and weights 250-300 grams, it can be passed through a wedding ring and easily fits into a shell of a goose egg. There are several kinds of Orenburg shawls. The first is the grey (seldom white) thick down hair shawls. These shawls started the tradition of Orenburg down-hair knitting. The second is the quite dense kerchiefs and pautinkas. They are used for everyday wear and they give a similar warmth to shawls. Such pautinkas are knitted in the Orsk region. The third kind of Orenburg shawls is very thin (compared with “spider web” pautinkas and tippets). As a rule thin pautinkas have fancy patterns and are used as decoration on special occasions. The best thin pautinkas are knitted in the settlements of Zholtoje and Shushma of Sarakhtash District. Such pautinkas are considered a fine decoration for any style of evening dress.

As a warp for pautinkas, knitters use rayon silk thread and for shawls they use cotton thread. Each knitter spins threads of different thickness. In pautinkas there are usually two-thirds of down hair and one-third of rayon silk thread. Beside shawls and kerchiefs, there are also other products that are knitted today from Orenburg down hair: sleeveless jackets, ponchos, downy and very warm sweaters.

== Special features ==
A quality shawl is knitted from hand-spun yarn: the knitter will spin a strong down hair yarn and then ply it with commercially spun silk thread. Such a shawl or kerchief will not look downy when first made. They start to develop a halo when they are worn, and will last for many years. A good knitter can knit two kerchiefs – pautinkas (“spider lines”) of medium size or three tippets a month. It will take a month or more to knit a large shawl or a kerchief with a pattern or inscription. Because of the high cost of down hair and yarn, an original hand-made Orenburg shawl or kerchief is an expensive luxury item.

== Related links ==
- Lace-making
