= Vasilyevka, Kudymkarsky District, Perm Krai =

Vasilyevka Васильевка
- Village
- Location within Perm Krai Location within Russia
- Coordinates: 58°59′N 54°49′E
- Country: Russia
- Region: Perm Krai
- District: Kudymkarsky District
- Time zone: UTC+5:00

Vasilyevka (Russian: Васильевка) is a rural locality (a village) in Stepanovskoye Rural Settlement, Kudymkarsky District, Perm Krai, Russia. The population was 1 as of 2010. There is 1 street.

== Geography ==
Vasilyevka is located 15 km southeast of Kudymkar (the district's administrative centre) by road. Ostapova is the nearest rural locality.
