= Saratov Airlines Flight 703 =

2018 airliner crash in Stepanovskoye, Russia

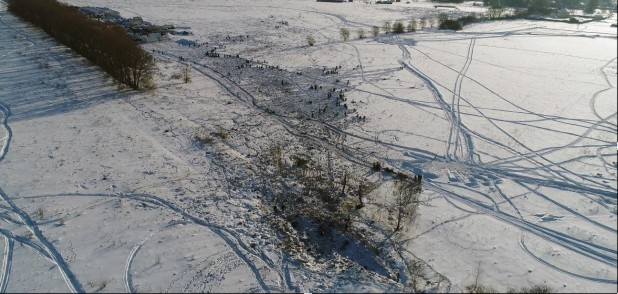
- The crash site of Flight 703

Accident
- Date: 11 February 2018
- Summary: Loss of control and crash during climb in icing conditions
- Site: Near Stepanovskoye, Moscow Oblast; 55°17′59″N 38°23′25″E

Aircraft
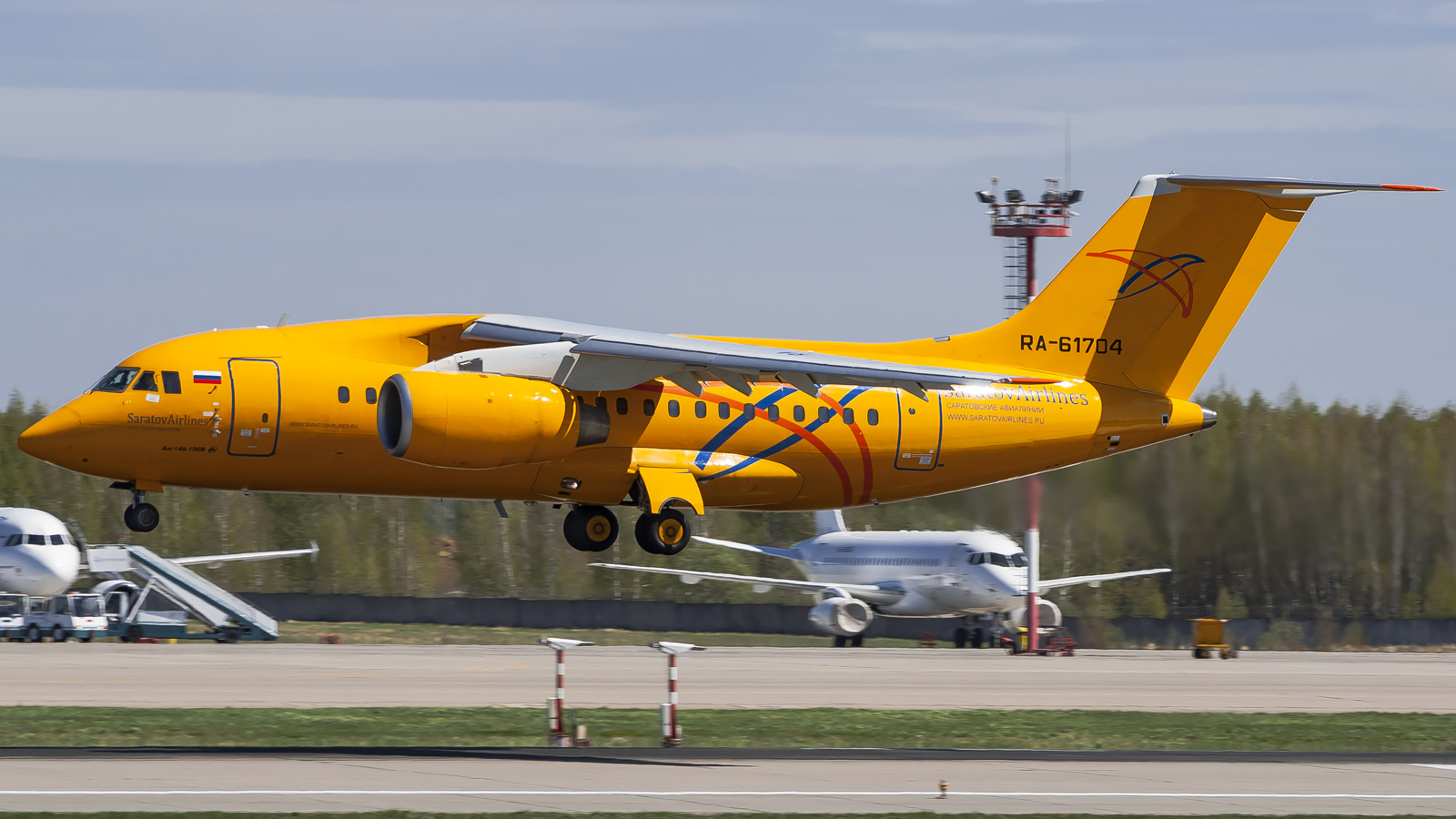
- RA-61704, the aircraft involved in the crash, seen in May 2017
- Aircraft type: Antonov An-148-100B
- Operator: Saratov Airlines
- IATA flight No.: 6W703
- ICAO flight No.: SOV703
- Call sign: Saratov Air 703
- Registration: RA-61704
- Flight origin: Moscow Domodedovo Airport, Moscow, Russia
- Destination: Orsk Airport, Orsk, Russia
- Occupants: 71
- Passengers: 65
- Crew: 6
- Fatalities: 71
- Survivors: 0

Saratov Airlines Flight 703 was a scheduled domestic passenger flight from Moscow to Orsk Airport in Russia that crashed shortly after take-off from Moscow Domodedovo Airport on 11 February 2018 in Stepanovskoye, Ramensky District. The Antonov An-148-100B serving the flight suddenly dived while en route to its destination, killing all 71 people on board. It was the deadliest crash involving the Antonov An-148 and the first commercial passenger flight crash involving the type.

The Russian Interstate Aviation Committee (IAC), which was responsible for the investigation of the crash, published the final report in 2019. They concluded that the crash was caused by multiple factors. The crews had decided not to turn on the pitot heaters even though the weather was conducive for icing. As the aircraft climbed, all three pitot tubes became blocked by ice, resulting in conflicting airspeed indications. The captain then quickly became fixated on resolving the issue and developed tunnel vision as he was unable to determine which reading was correct. Overwhelmed, he ignored warnings from his co-pilot, continued making a nose-down input, and caused the aircraft to dive and crash at high speed.

== Aircraft ==
The aircraft involved in the accident was an Antonov An-148-100B built by Voronezh Aircraft Production Association, registration RA-61704, MSN 27015040004, powered by two Progress D-436 engines. It first flew in May 2010 and was delivered to Rossiya Airlines in June 2010. It had been involved in two previous minor incidents in service; an engine was shut down on 28 July 2013 after it surged in flight, and it suffered a nose wheel failure on take-off on 23 August 2013. The aircraft continued to operate with Rossiya until 2015. After years of storage, the aircraft had been leased to Saratov Airlines since February 2017, a year prior to the crash. The aircraft had flown about 16,250 hours and 8,400 landings against a designed life of 20,000 hours.

The aircraft had been involved in several previous incidents during service. In December 2010, the aircraft was struck by a snow-removal vehicle while being parked at Pulkovo Airport, causing significant damage to the wing. The aircraft was quickly repaired and went back to service on that same month. Two minor issues were also noted; an engine was shut down on 28 July 2013 after it surged in flight, and a nose wheel failure occurred on take-off on 23 August 2013.

The maintenance logbook indicated that prior to the flight, the aircraft had suffered some deferred defects, including a fuel-pump failure on No.2 engine. Despite the numerous faults, the aircraft was still allowed for service.

== Passengers and crew ==
According to the flight manifest, Flight 703 was carrying 65 passengers and 6 crew members. Most of the passengers were residents of Orenburg. Russian news agency TASS reported that there were three children aboard the flight. The Russian Ministry of Emergency Situations said that all but two of the passengers were Russian citizens. The Azerbaijani community in Orsk confirmed that an Azerbaijani businessman was on board, while the Swiss embassy reported that a Swiss engineer was among the passengers.

Passengers and crew of Flight 703
Nationality	Passengers	Crew	Total
Russia	63	6	69
Azerbaijan	1	0	1
Switzerland	1	0	1
Total	65	6	71

The cockpit crews were consisted of:

- Captain Valery Gubanov (51), who had accumulated 5,000 hours of total flying experience, of which 2,800 were on the Antonov An-148. However, he had logged only 58 hours as pilot in command on the aircraft. He graduated from the Tambov Higher Military Aviation School in 1991 and served in the Russian Army until 2001, flying the Antonov An-12. He then worked as a pilot for the Russian Interior Ministry until 2005 before taking a three-year break from flying. He entered the civil aviation industry in 2008 and joined Saratov Airlines in 2011. His medical certificate had expired two days before the accident.
- First Officer Sergei Gambaryan (35), who had accumulated a total flying experience of 860 flight hours, of which 720 were on the type. He graduated from Leningrad aviation technical school in 1993 and worked in an air transport organization for a short period before spending 11 years as a flight attendant in various Russian airlines. He eventually joined piloting in 2013 through a training programme held by South Ural State University.

== Accident ==
Flight route of Saratov Airlines Flight 703

=== Flight history ===
Flight 703 was a regularly scheduled domestic passenger service from Moscow's Domodedovo Airport to Orsk Airport in Orsk, a city near the border to Kazakhstan and one of the most important industrial cities in Orenburg Oblast. The flight was operated by Russian regional carrier Saratov Airlines. At the time, it was the only flight from the Russian capital to Orsk. On 11 February 2018, the flight would be operated by one of the airlines' Antonov An-148 fleet, the RA-61704. The scheduled departure time from Moscow was 14:00.

Prior to the flight to Orsk, the aircraft was flown for a service flight from Saratov to Moscow, operating as Flight 760. Among the deadheading crew were Captain Gubanov and the rest of the cabin crew members, while First Officer Gambaryan would later catch up in Moscow. The aircraft arrived in Moscow at 10:02 a.m., arriving 5 hours late from its scheduled arrival due to delays during flight preparations in Saratov.

=== Preparation ===
After arriving in Moscow, the flight crews went to the airport for a pre-flight medical check, which they both passed. They later received the updated weather forecast for the flight. The on-duty forecaster explained that the pilots should watch out for moderate snow and severe icing while flying. The pilots then arrived at their aircraft, and Captain Gubanov started inspecting the Antonov An-148 for signs of ice. Following a walk around the aircraft, he used a ladder to inspect the upper surface of the left wing and concluded that no de-icing procedure was needed for the flight.

The aircraft was loaded with 472 kg of cargo and 561 kg of baggage. A total of 65 passengers boarded the plane. Both pilots went to the cockpit and started the pre-flight briefing.

After completing the boarding process, the flight crews started the "before engine start" checklist. While going through the checklist, the flight crews noticed that a message had appeared on the main display, informing them on a fault on the aircraft. First Officer Gambaryan commented "this is a fault, it was like this yesterday too", and Captain Gubanov merely responded with a simple "uh-huh."

The crew then proceeded with the next checklists and started to taxi to runway 14R. After being cleared to line up and wait, the crew ran through the "at line up checklist" while waiting. Finishing the checklist, First Officer Gambaryan stated "checklist complete, just the pitot probes left", referring to the activation of the pitot heaters. Captain Gubanov answered "pitot probes, good...".

Soon after, Flight 703 received take-off clearance from the ATC. The aircraft took off from Domodedovo at 14:21 local time, approximately 20 minutes late from its scheduled departure.

=== Start of failure ===
For the first three minutes after take-off, the aircraft was climbing normally. At 11:24:10 local time, the aircraft's recorded airspeed started to fluctuate. While climbing through an altitude of 1,100 meters, two of the aircraft's airspeed channels, the first probe and the standby probe, began showing different readings. Around 15 seconds later, all three airspeed indicators started to disagree with each other. The crew didn't notice yet as they were going through another flight checklist and were focusing instead on getting further permission to increase their altitude. At this point, the aircraft was still put in a climb as the crew got the required clearace to FL70 and later to FL110. The ATC granted the pilots request to climb to FL110. Shortly after, the An-148 warning system gave the crew "COMPARE AIRSPEED" alarm. The airspeed reading on Captain Gubanov's side was on 457 knots, while the standby probe read 430 knots. This prompted First Officer Gambaryan to check on whether they had the correct airspeed reading.

11:24:49	Commentary	Airspeed compare
11:24:56	First Officer Gambaryan	It's fine, I'll check now, (unintelligible), 450?
11:24:59	Commentary	Warning ceases
11:25:59	First Officer Gambaryan	Confirmed. Same, it's settled.

Several seconds later, the warning ceased. The airspeed on the first probe had converged within 5 km/h with the reading on the second probe. Satisfied, First Officer Gambaryan stated that the matter was settled, and the crew went back to their previous task. However, the airspeed diverged again for the second time. The first probe had its airspeed reading at 490 km/h before falling, while the standby probe had risen to 440 km/h. Since the difference between the readings on the first probe and second probe were within 10 km/h, no warning sounded. Captain Gubanov had been watching the fluctuating airspeed and started to be cautious.

11:25:08	Captain Gubanov	So... second time today with this speed.
11:25:12	First Officer Gambaryan	Yeah?
11:25:13	Captain Gubanov	Yeah, first time it dropped sharply, I set 62, though it was sitting right there... so...op-
11:25:24	Captain Gubanov	Right, we watch the speed... it wanders back and forth - I'll set 460, hand-fly if need be.

Wanting to hold the airspeed, he set the autopilot at 460 km/h. The aircraft continued to climb normally with both probes giving different readings, rising and falling intermittently. Despite of it, the pilots didn't compare both probes and kept continuing with the flight.

=== First descent ===
Around 11:25 a.m, while climbing through an altitude of 2,000 meters, the "airspeed compare" warning sounded again for the second time. Captain Gubanov's probe showed a rapidly decreasing indicated airspeed, while the reading on the standby channel started to catch up and rose quickly. Alarmed with the falling airspeed, Captain Gubanov put the aircraft into a rapid descent by pushing the nose down, wanting to chase the speed he believed he was losing, causing the autopilot to disconnect. The aircraft pitched from 5 degrees up to 5 degrees down, g-load eased at 0,5 G and the aircraft descended at a rate of 20m/s. Gubanov's input caught First Officer Gambaryan off guard, causing him to try correcting the input by himself. Gubanov's airspeed display later showed the reading from the standby probe, in which the airspeed had jumped by 100 km/h. Meanwhile, the irregular speed warning had finally ceased.

11:25:50	First Officer Gambaryan	Eh, eh, eh - where, so hard?
11:25:51	Captain Gubanov	Hold 400
11:25:56	Captain Gubanov	What are you doing?
11:25:57	First Officer Gambaryan	Pull the thrust back a bit, that's all

The autothrottle was turned off and the thrust was pulled back towards idle. First Officer Gambaryan, whose airspeed display was showing the correct value, queried Gubanov's decision to pitch down, which he found perplexing due to the high speed of the aircraft. Gubanov, trying to understand the situation, kept making the nose down input. The actual airspeed, meanwhile, had been creeping towards the overspeed limit of the aircraft as the aircraft kept gaining speed. First Officer Gambaryan pulled the nose up a bit and managed to arrest the descent. Captain Gubanov, sensed that something was wrong with the aircraft, started to feel stressed with the condition.

11:26:14	First Officer Gambaryan	Why are you going down? You needed nose-up to bleed the speed off and you went down.
11:26:18	Captain Gubanov	I see, I see, I see.
11:26:22	First Officer Gambaryan	Up, like this.
11:26:23	Captain Gubanov	Alright, hang on, hang on, hang on, hang on
11:26:26	Captain Gubanov	Something's really gone wrong here
11:26:28	First Officer Gambaryan	No, I thought you wanted to go up, but instead you went down.

The aircraft then started gaining altitude as it began to climb again. The overspeed warning ceased and the airspeed started to gradually decrease.

=== Crash ===
The aircraft was nearly reaching an altitude of 1,900 meters when the indicated airspeed on Captain Gubanov's display, which had been showing the reading from the standby probe, had dramatically fallen steeply from 480 km/h to around 300 km/h. First Officer Gambaryan's probe had also showed a significantly decreasing airspeed, from 440 km/h to 400 km/h. The airspeed continued to drop, causing Captain Gubanov to freak out. He then immediately put the aircraft into a descent by pitching the nose down again, this time at 16 degrees. First Officer Gambaryan, confused by Gubanov's abrupt input, asked him again on why he put the aircraft into a descent since the aircraft was flying normally, causing Gubanov to snap back at him and told him to stop talking.

14:26:42	Captain Gubanov	Hey, whoa, whoa, whoa, 300, 290, damn it!
14:26:44	First Officer Gambaryan	Why are you going down?!
14:26:45	Captain Gubanov	Because it's 250!
14:26:46	Captain Gubanov	Quit your bullshit!
14:26:47	First Officer Gambaryan	Where are you going down, why down?

Few seconds later, the aircraft's fly-by-wire system declared complete failure on all airspeed readings and deemed all of them invalid. The last two surviving probes had differed on their readings, reaching a difference of 36 km/h. The system then reconfigured the aircraft: pitch sensitivity doubled and autonomous nose-down input. Meanwhile, Captain Gubanov saw that the indicated airspeed continued to drop, now reaching only 200 km/h. Panicked by the reading, he doubled down on the pitch, making a nose-down input of 30 degrees below the horizon. First Officer Gambaryan alerted Gubanov that the aircraft was rapidly losing altitude. Gubanov yelled at him, ignoring his warning.

14:26:54	Captain Gubanov	200 - speed...
14:26:56	First Officer Gambaryan	Altitude! Altitude!
14:26:57	Captain Gubanov	To hell with the altitude!

As the aircraft came hurtling down at a speed of more than 50 m/s, the aircraft's ground-proximity warning system blared, warning the crew of their impending crash with terrain. Roughly at an altitude of 1,200 meters, First Officer Gambaryan decided to intervene by making a nose-up input, even though Captain Gubanov kept pushing the aircraft towards the ground. Gubanov, startled by his co-pilot's input, ordered him to stop making the input. The airspeed finally reached the overspeed limit, causing the alarm to blare again.

14:27:00	Captain Gubanov	Where are you going?! Don't pull, [expletive]!!!
14:27:04	Commentary	Sound of overspeed warning

External videos
- CCTV footage
- Footage of Flight 703 crashing into an open field near Stepanovskoye on YouTube

Gubanov continued to make nose-down inputs until the aircraft reached an altitude of 300 to 400 meters above the ground, at which point it broke through the cloud cover. As soon as it came through the base, both pilots saw the quickly approaching ground. Surprised, Captain Gubanov immediately made a full nose-up input on the control column, generating g-forces equivalent to 4.2 g. The input, however, was too late. With a speed of approximately 770 km/h, a nose pitch of 30 degrees, and a right bank angle of 25 degrees, the aircraft slammed onto the snowy ground in an open field near Stepanovskoye, at 14:27 local time (11:27 UTC), six minutes after take-off from Moscow's Domodedovo Airport. All 71 passengers and crews on board were killed instantly. The crash was caught by a surveillance camera in a nearby house. The footage showed that the aircraft slammed into the ground, and immediately burst into flames.

=== Immediate aftermath ===
Rescue operation on the crash site of Flight 703

Following unsuccessful attempts to contact Flight 703, the flight was declared missing. Meanwhile, in Stepanovskoye, the district's fire brigade received a telephone call from residents regarding an emergency involving an aircraft. They eventually discovered that a plane had just crashed at a nearby open field during heavy snow. In Moscow, authorities deployed a Mil Mi-8 helicopter to search for the aircraft. Around 15:55 local time, the team found the crash site. However, due to the likelihood of worsening weather conditions in the area, the crew decided to head back to their base. The location of the site was pinpointed and was quickly identified. The aircraft crashed near the villages of Argunovo and Stepanovskoye in Ramensky District of Moscow Oblast. Rescue workers reached the site 2.5 hours after the crash.

Several additional helicopters were deployed to the site carrying personnel from Russia's EMERCOM. The area was later cordoned off, with an area of 50 hectares stretching to the north would be combed thoroughly by rescuers. The debris were thought to be scattered within a radius of 1 km. Due to the high-speed impact, most of the debris and bodies were found to be in small sizes. More than 1,400 body parts were recovered, while more than 4,000 debris were collected, which would be transported to Zhukovsky for reconstruction. Russian Minister of Emergency Situations Vladimir Puchkov stated that the search operation would use drones and snowmobiles to scour the area. According to EMERCOM, approximately 1,000 personnel were deployed for the operation.

The first flight recorder, the FDR, was found on 11 February with its casing significantly damaged from the impact. The second recorder, the CVR, was found on the next day with its body separated from the main device. Both were sent to Moscow for examination. The data from both devices were able to be successfully deciphered by IAC. On 18 February, the search and rescue operation was officially ended.

== Response ==
=== Government response ===
An emergency meeting held in Moscow by EMERCOM following the crash of Flight 703

Maslenitsa celebrations in Moscow, pictured here a day before the crash. The festival was later cancelled in the aftermath of the disaster

Following the crash, an emergency hotline was established and crisis centres were set up at Orsk and Moscow. Russian Minister of Transport Maxim Sokolov traveled to Moscow to hold talks with Minister of Emergency Situations Vladimir Puchkov, Moscow Governor Andrei Vorobyov and Rosaviatsiya Director Alexander Neradko. Vorobyov would then head to the crash site to observe the rescue operation. Governor of Orenburg, Yury Berg, flew to Orsk to oversee the emergency response center. Puchkov later stated that psychologists from the ministry would provide informational and support for the next of kin. He later declared a state of emergency for the services involved in the aftermath of the crash, including the firefighter garrison in Orenburg.

President Vladimir Putin cancelled his planned trip to Sochi in response to the disaster. The government stated that he would coordinate with the special commission he had set up. Russian authorities initially stated that they would organize a special flight from Orsk to Moscow for the next of kin for identification. Saratov Airlines confirmed that the airline would provide flights for relatives from their respective regions to Moscow. Three hotels would be prepared to host the relatives in Moscow, which would be covered by Saratov Airlines. Ministry of Emergency Situations also announced that an aircraft would depart from Orsk to carry DNA samples from relatives, adding that relatives were not obliged to fly to Moscow for identification process. Moscow-based Mosgortrans was later ordered to provide buses to transport the next of kin during their visit in Moscow.

Orenburg government announced that February 12 would be designated as a day of mourning. Several entertainment programs were cancelled in Orenburg and Moscow, including events in Moscow's Maslenitsa Festival. Bells of the Vysokopetrovsky Monastery were rang in respect to the victims of the crash and a memorial service would be held at St. Sergius Church. Prayers for the victims were also held across churches in Orsk for 40 days. Flowers were also laid by mourners across multiple locations in Orsk, including in Orsk main city square, the Komsomolskaya Square, and at Orsk Airport. A minute of silence was conducted prior to the start of the VTB United League. In Saratov Airport, officials held a memorial service and a rally dedicated to the victims. On February 19, Orsk residents held an official memorial service in the city's Komsomolskaya Square, with residents blaring horns and releasing 71 white balloons representing each victims. List of the victims were displayed on two large screens at the city's drama theatre.

The head of the Ministry of Labour and Social Affairs, Maxim Topilin, stated that all relatives of the victims were insured by AlfaStrakhovanie, one of Russia's largest private insurance company, and each would be given 2 million rubles (about US$35,000). Topilin later added that an additional 25,000 rubles for burial would be provided alongside another 1 million rubles through social security. His ministry would also order the country's Social Insurance Fund and the Pension Fund for assistance with payment arrangements. A provisional payment of 100,000 rubles would be provided. Minister of Emergency Situations, Vladimir Puchkov, later asked banks to consider writing off loans and debts of the victims for financial assistance. Accordingly, a total of four banks decided to repay loans of the victims.

Several governments of Russian regions where the victims had originated announced that they would give 1 million rubles in compensations from their regional budgets. In Moscow, the city's mayor Sergey Sobyanin stated that the funeral of Muscovites victims would be covered by the government. He also announced that children of the victims would be given monthly tuitions of 13,000 rubles each month. Authorities in Orenburg would provide tuition fees and loan repayments; and families who were under difficult financial situations would be assisted. An open donation was set up by the Russian public, which managed to raise more than 5 million rubles. Some relatives demanded increased compensations due to moral damages that had been inflicted and sued Saratov Airlines. The matters were settled out of court.

Around early April, two months after the disaster, authorities decided to continued recovery operation at the site following reports from local residents that body parts and fragments of the wreckage were still being found in the area. The site was cordoned again as personnel began recovery efforts. Officials stated that the operation would resume significantly after snow and ice in the area had melted. At the same time, relatives of the victims accused Russian authorities of purposefully withholding and not allowing the families to bury the bodies. They also criticized the slow progress of identifying the victims. The Russian government stated that the bodies would need months for testing and identification before being buried.The bodies were finally sent to their respective families starting on November.

=== Impromptu inspection ===
In response to the crash, Rostranadzor stated that there would be an unscheduled inspection at Domodedovo Airport and Saratov Airline's main headquarters in Saratov in relation to the probe. Inspectors planned to examine documents related to the flight and the operation of aircraft by the airline. Authorities stated that the inspection would likely take around one week, before being extended to 20 days.

The Russian prosecutor's office launched criminal proceedings for suspected violations of air traffic safety rules. It found reports that the airline had been banned from operating international routes in 2015, and that these had resumed after a change in policy in 2016. The Russian Federal Service for Supervision of Transport (Rostransnadzor) stated that during its examination on the accident aircraft, the airline had violated the procedure for changing oil in the gearboxes, and the procedure for washing the air starter filter.

Authorities discovered discrepancies during an examination of one of the pilots' files, raising questions about the validity of his license. The involved pilot, First Officer Gambaryan, had his flying license issued a day before his university diploma. Russian laws prohibited pilots from getting training before acquiring relevant higher education documents. Similar issues were also reported in 70 other Russian pilots. Rosaviatsiya had stated that pilots who had been flying with their problematic licenses would have theirs revoked and would be sent for retraining.

The discovery led the Russian government to open a criminal case regarding the unauthorized issuance of pilot diplomas across the nation. Reviews would be taken against several Russian flight institutions, including Chelyabinsk Civil Aviation Flight School, where First Officer Gambaryan had been educated. According to the investigation, the centre had not been certified as a training centre. The university which oversaw the facility, South Ural State University, had illegally provided educational services at its specialized aerospace department. The findings led authorities to postpone the centre's current students from obtaining licenses, which would be challenged by their graduates in court.

=== Closure of Saratov Airlines ===
Saratov Airlines suspended all An-148 operations and all flights to Orsk on 12 February and resumed An-148 services on 16 February after completing technical inspections of its fleet. On 20 March, following the inspection, Rostransnadzor suspended the airline's operations after identifying additional regulatory violations. The agency also called for the grounding of all Antonov An-148 aircraft in service over safety concerns. Rosaviatsiya later clarified that the order applied only to Saratov Airlines and would not affect other Russian operators. The airline's air operator certificate was also restricted until 27 April, citing the "unprecedented and irresponsible attitude of Saratov Airlines' management toward flight safety," while it was instructed to limit its activities to airport operations.

Saratov Airlines appealed the decision and filed a plea to lift restrictions on its air operator certificate, stating that they had addressed all the issues that had been discovered by Rosaviatsiya during the unscheduled inspection. However, Russian authorities decided to extend the restrictions for another month after the company's improvements were deemed inadequate. The company filed another request to lift the restriction after more improvements were made, but the airline was told to suspend its entire operation by the end of May. Ticket sales would be suspended, effective by May 30, and passengers currently abroad had to be repatriated back. The airline would not be allowed to use their aircraft anymore after May 30.

On 1 June 2018 Saratov Airlines' air operator's certificate was revoked. Since the airline's main hub was concentrated in Saratov region, Russian authorities stated that routes operated by the airline would be reorganized after the completion of the 2018 FIFA World Cup. Russian Railways and several Russian airliners had stated their willingness to assist with the transport of passengers who had been booked on Saratov Airlines and the operation of the airline's former routes. Saratov Airlines announced that a total of 15,000 tickets amounting to 100 million rubles had been refunded to their customers.

== Investigation ==
Altitude and speed of Saratov Airlines Flight 703

The recovered flight recorders from Flight 703, consisted of the cockpit voice recorder (left) and flight data recorder (right)

The Russian Interstate Aviation Committee (IAC) opened an investigation into the accident. President Vladimir Putin also set up a special commission to investigate the crash. Within the first few hours of the investigation, the Ministry of Transport announced two theories regarding the crash – weather conditions and human factors.

Moments before the crash, Flight 703 had gained an altitude of 1,800 metres (5,900 ft) and an airspeed of 600 kilometres per hour (320 kn; 370 mph). It then lost altitude rapidly until it disappeared from the radar at an altitude of around 900 metres (3,000 ft). According to a source inside the investigation, a few minutes before the crash the pilot of the aircraft told air traffic controllers about a malfunction, and that he planned to make an emergency landing at Zhukovsky. This report was later dismissed by the investigation committee. Eyewitnesses reported that the aircraft was in flames during its descent to ground.

The wreckage of Flight 703 was scattered over a wide area. Officials stated that the radius of the crash site area was about one kilometer (0.62 miles), which added suspicion that the aircraft possibly had disintegrated in mid-flight. Since a witness stated it was in flames during its descent, a bomb theory was put forward by several investigators.

On 13 February, the IAC reported that initial analysis of data from the flight data recorder showed that the pitot tube heaters were not turned on and there were discrepancies in the airspeeds being displayed to the pilots, with one airspeed indicator showing increasing airspeed, one showing decreasing airspeed and the third showing no airspeed. The data also showed that the aircraft was under manual control when it pitched nose down some 30° below the horizontal and remained in that attitude until it impacted the ground.

=== Loss of control ===
Russian news agency Rambler News Service (RNS) reported that the pilot of Flight 703 had declined to have the aircraft de-iced before the departure. According to a METAR weather report, the weather at 11:00 included snow showers and a temperature of −5 °C (23 °F) at Domodedovo Airport. CCTV footage from Domodedovo, together with interviews with ground personnel, confirmed that Captain Gubanov had refused to have the aircraft de-iced prior to take-off. The reason for his refusal could not be determined by investigators. However, the investigation confirmed that the aircraft had arrived late from Saratov, resulting in a significant five-hour delay from its scheduled arrival time in Moscow. This delay may have contributed to the crew’s haste before departure. Data from local weather stations also showed that authorities had issued SIGMET-1, valid until 12:00 p.m., warning pilots of conditions favourable for icing. The warning indicated severe icing associated with freezing rain from the surface up to FL070, while nearby airports reported light-to-moderate icing in cloud. Icing conditions had also been reported in the area for several days.

Although airframe icing was found not to have affected the aircraft's controllability, the investigation determined that all three of the aircraft's pitot tubes, the probes that measure airspeed, had become blocked by ice. Before take-off the crew did not switch on the pitot heaters, having omitted the checklist section that controls that step. Investigators could not establish a definite reason but concluded that the aircraft's late arrival and the crew's consequent haste had most probably contributed to the step being skipped. As the unheated probes climbed through freezing humid air with temperatures below 0°C and relative humidity around 80% through the climb layer, the tubes got iced over, and the recorded airspeeds began to diverge during the climb, producing unreliable indications. Flight recorder data showed the readings from indicator No. 1 (Captain Gubanov's probe) and indicator No. 3 (the standby probe) disagreeing, which triggered the aircraft's "airspeed compare" warning to the crew.

The frozen pitots were not directly responsible for the loss of control, as the erroneous reading would not cause the aircraft system to crash. When the airspeed signals were rejected as invalid, the An-148's flight-control system doubled its pitch sensitivity, but the aircraft's flight path still depended on the pilots' inputs. Flight recorder data indicated that Captain Gubanov’s continuous nose-down inputs ultimately led to the loss of control. Since his reading (airspeed indicator no. 1) became erroneous due to icing, he quickly concluded that the aircraft was losing speed and thus had to be put into a descent to regain speed, without cross-checking with the first officer. First Officer Gambaryan's instruments were initially more accurate and showed a different, higher airspeed, which added to the confusion. As the icing worsened, the discrepancies eventually affected all three airspeed channels, and the system rejected the readings as invalid.

The conflicting information eventually increased Gubanov’s psycho-emotional stress, causing him to become fixated on the airspeed discrepancy. He continued to believe, on the basis of his own probe, that the aircraft was losing speed and treated the differing indications from the other instruments as false. First Officer Gambaryan, whose instruments were initially more accurate, became bewildered and repeatedly challenged the captain's descent, but the captain sharply rebuffed him and did not register or act on his prompts. Investigators considered it likely that Gubanov had developed tunnel vision brought on by stress and his fixation on the airspeed, causing him to concentrate solely on his own indicator and disregard other information. When Gambaryan physically intervened on the controls to pull the nose up, the captain reacted sharply, ordering him not to, as he was still believing that the aircraft was losing speed even though it was by then exceeding its maximum permissible speed and continuing to do so even after an overspeed alarm sounded.

First Officer Gambaryan had tried to pull up, but the aircraft didn't budge. The aircraft's two control columns are not mechanically linked to each other, and each column produces an independent electrical signal. Both pilots' inputs would be averaged, and the result would form the command for the elevator, which would cause the aircraft to pitch up or pitch down. In normal operation, with one pilot flying, the other column rests at neutral, and when both pilots act together, their inputs reinforce one another. When the two pilots command opposite directions at once, however, the averaging works against them. In the final seconds of Flight 703, Gubanov held his column forward (nose-down) while Gambaryan pulled his aft (nose-up), with deflections of roughly +85 mm by Gubanov and −67 mm by Gambaryan, applying about 42 and 39 kilograms of force, respectively. This resulted in the two signals being largely cancelled, and the resulting elevator command was small. The elevator therefore barely moved, and Gambaryan's correct nose-up input, rather than overriding the captain's, was numerically averaged against it into near-nothing. Because the columns are independent, neither pilot could feel the other working against him, only that the aircraft was not responding, and the An-148 provided no priority or takeover function by which one pilot could lock the other out. This eventually caused the aircraft to continue diving towards the ground until it broke the cloud base, when the pilots finally saw the quickly approaching ground.

=== CRM failure ===
The investigation found that the accident was preventable, and credited First Officer Gambaryan's airmanship. Mathematical modelling made by the IAC indicated that a recovery begun at the moment he intervened on the controls would most probably have avoided the collision. The model showed that the aircraft would have cleared terrain by 200 meters. Flight recorder data showed that he took corrective action, pulling the nose up and reducing thrust, and that he had repeatedly challenged Captain Gubanov's descent despite the aircraft's high airspeed. During the final dive, Gambaryan pulled his control column aft with considerable force to arrest the descent. His input was not enough to override the captain's opposing nose-down input, however, because the An-148's fly-by-wire system averages the two pilots' commands, which led to the aircraft's impact.

The final report stated that there was no coordination among the pilots during the flight. Both pilots were found to have never flown together before, as they had only been cleared to fly in rotation, with First Officer Gambaryan flying since October 2017 and Gubanov being the most recent, from January 2018. The investigation identified a total breakdown in crew resource management, including a poor division of flying and monitoring duties, disorganised actions, a failure to prioritise tasks, and ineffective communication. It specifically noted the communication failure between the pilots, most evident when Gambaryan tried to warn Gubanov against putting the aircraft into a descent. Gambaryan's correct assessments were not acknowledged or acted upon, and although the two pilots were by then seeing substantially different airspeeds on their respective instruments, neither attempted to compare the two readings.

One of the major reasons for the complete communication failure was attributed to Captain Gubanov's actions and psychological state during the flight. Aeromedical psychological assessments of the two pilots had found that both were prone to stress: under acute stress, Gubanov tended to become fixated and less flexible in his thinking and behaviour, while Gambaryan was likely to act in a disorganised manner. In the event, Gubanov became overwhelmed by heightened psycho-emotional stress, which the report found played a major role in the accident. He first showed concern about the speed after the initial airspeed compare warning. His tone began to rise as he began to become more stressed by the situation as he tried to fix the situation by putting the aircraft into a descent, yet his airspeed indicator continued to show low airspeed while the overspeed alarm simultaneously blared. At one point, his speech control began to deteriorate. As the airspeed began to dramatically fluctuate, his thoughts were then dominantly filled with the airspeed issue, causing him to divert his attention solely to his own airspeed probe and to push other things aside.

According to the investigation, Gubanov's psycho-emotional stress sharply lowered his ability to form a correct integral assessment as he was unable to perceive the correct picture of the situation. This progressed to his fixation and eventual tunnel effect, which caused him to be unable to hear external prompts, in this case the responses from his co-pilot. The investigation noted that Gubanov's raised tone and outburst when Gambaryan tried to recover the aircraft was the most evident sign of his incapacitation, explicitly calling him as in a "lost" state, had lost the ability to predict the aircraft's behavior and had complete loss of situational awareness. The first officer's own stress also rose as he failed to understand the captain's actions, adding to the tension in the cockpit.

While the report credited Gambaryan's airmanship, it also found that his own stress response had most probably limited how decisively he was able to act. This was also compounded by the fact that neither Saratov Airlines' operating manuals nor its training provided any criteria for recognising psychological incapacitation in another crew member, and that Gambaryan had received no training for such a situation. It concluded that this absence of any framework authorising or guiding a takeover, combined with the first officer's own stress response, most probably prevented him from intervening more decisively than he did.

The report placed these findings within a broader criticism of the airline's approach to crew resource management. It found the training of the pilots in human factors, threat-and-error management, and CRM to have been inadequate, and criticised the practice of pairing crew members with no shared flying experience for demanding operations. In the commission's account, the breakdown on Flight 703 was not a matter of individual temperament but the predictable outcome of placing two inadequately prepared and unfamiliar pilots together, without the training or procedures that crew resource management is intended to provide.

=== Preceding incident ===
The IAC noted that the crash of Flight 703 bore a striking resemblance to an incident involving another Russian passenger domestic flight in 2015, which the commission cited as evidence that the crash of Flight 703 had been foreseeable. On 27 May 2015, an Angara Airlines Antonov An-148, registration RA-61710, was operating as Flight 753 from Irkutsk to Bratsk, carrying 65 passengers. The weather at Irkutsk was shower rain with gusty wind. During the take-off roll, the flight crew noticed that no airspeed was shown on their indicators, one of them commenting "speed's not increasing," and the aircraft's systems provided no warning to the crew about the invalid airspeed. The standby indicator did show a fluctuating airspeed, although it too was invalid. With no clear warning, the captain tried to determine what was wrong and could not reject the take-off in time. The commission noted that had he rejected the moment he saw no airspeed, the situation would have been preventable. He elected to continue the take-off rather than reject it. Despite the differing readings, the crew went on to land the aircraft safely, flying manually and cooperating closely with ATC, using groundspeed and angle of attack as references.

The cause was determined to be ground crew error. Because of the rain, the servicing technician had decided to leave the covers on the probes and to remove them only about 15 minutes before departure. That removal never took place, and no one verified that it had. The captain, during his walk-around, saw that the covers were still on the probes but disregarded it, assuming the ground crew would remove them later. With no confirmation from anyone, the covers remained in place, preventing the probes from providing correct measurements.

The incident was reported to the IAC, and the subsequent investigation found that the An-148's operating manual contained no procedure for the crew to follow in the event of a loss of airspeed indication on both the primary and standby instruments, or when the pitot tubes were partially or fully blocked. The IAC issued a recommendation that Antonov develop and add such a special-situations procedure to the flight manual. Antonov, however, declined the recommendation as inexpedient, stating that no such procedure was needed. It gave several reasons: that a loss of airspeed indication on the primary instruments was a "practically improbable" event, that such a failure could only occur if the covers were left on the probes, which was itself a gross violation by operators, and that the existing manual was already sufficient.

In the final report, the IAC was sharply critical of this reasoning, which had left the very gap that the Flight 703 crew would later encounter. Antonov had focused solely on the covers, whereas the commission held that the more important issue was the failure mode itself, in which all of the aircraft's airspeed channels being rendered unreliable, with no warning issued to the pilots, which could arise from causes other than covers. Investigators stressed that such a failure could occur in future not only from covers accidentally left on or from equipment failure, but also from crew error and even external causes, such as volcanic ash or in-flight pitot icing occurring despite the heating being switched on. The commission explicitly cited Air France Flight 447 as an example of the latter. It reinforced the point by noting that other manufacturers: Airbus, Boeing, and the Russian Superjet RRJ-95, all included "unreliable airspeed" procedures for crews to use and train on, making this an industry standard that the An-148 lacked.

=== Oversight failure ===
Russian investigators commented on Saratov Airlines' lax and poor oversight. In Flight 703, the flight recording showed no reaction from both flight crew when six warning messages of re-occurring and unresolved flight issues re-appeared on the flight primary display prior to take-off, indicating that it was not unusual for the crew to ignore the warning. The IAC also noted that despite having a monitoring system for its flight operations, the system was ineffective and did not lead to any action when crews were recorded repeatedly taking off with the pitot heating switched on late or not at all. In one of its flight data analysis, there were three incidents involving the late activation and even non-activation of pitot heaters. In one case, the heaters were switched on 22 seconds after the take-off roll began, and in another only once airborne, 154 seconds after the start of the roll. Captain Gubanov had been a member of the crew on two of these flights. Despite this, the airline was unable to demonstrate to the commission that it had taken any measures to reduce the risk after these events were identified.

The IAC found that the airline had a safety management system (SMS) in place, but that corrective measures were not taken even when the system recorded problems. The commission identified a systematic practice of not recording detected in-flight faults in the maintenance logbook. It also found that aircraft were flown with defects that had been neither rectified nor properly entered on the deferred-defects list, while the corresponding cautions remained displayed to the crew. The airline's minimum equipment (MEL) procedures were themselves deficient, permitting dispatch with cautions that could not be cleared from the display and setting no limit on how many such messages could be present at once. This practice contributed to a habituation among the airline's crews to taking off with caution messages displayed. On Flight 703, First Officer Gambaryan could be heard audibly saying, "this is a fault, it was like this yesterday too."

The findings on Saratov Airlines' training programme suggested that there were gaps in both pilots' training. The investigation could not confirm whether both pilots had been trained properly on the airspeed system. Further examination revealed that Captain Gubanov had been flying without the required Enhanced Ground Proximity Warning System (EGPWS) training for much of 2017. More deficiencies were noted by investigators, for example, ground preparation that was logged in days while pilots were carrying out trips on unrelated flights, filling out forms on templates for another type of aircraft, and simulator sessions conducted by instructors from another airline. The records were so unreliable that the IAC eventually could not establish what training had even been practised. The investigation also identified a structural reason the crew could not have been prepared for the airspeed failure even in principle. Operating Russian airlines should have their simulator programme being certified by the country's regulator, as per the Russian Air Code, and the requirements were to be set by the Russian federal aviation rules. However, despite the existence of legal requirements, the rules never existed, and hence there was no framework to use for the certification. As a result, simulation training could be approved without regard to their actual capabilities in reproducing special in-flight situations.

Following the discovery of the improper issuance for First Officer Gambaryan's license, the investigation noted systemic deficiencies in Rosaviatsiya's oversight. His license had been issued on the basis of training from an institution that lacked the required certification. Investigators noted that the same problem had been detected since the crash of Tatarstan Airlines Flight 363, indicating that the recommendations that had been issued before had never been properly followed. The IAC later concluded that systemic failures on all levels by Russian aviation authorities, together with the low safety culture and poor safety management system in Saratov Airlines, eventually enabled the crash.

=== Conclusion ===
On 27 June 2019, the IAC published the final report of the investigation. The commission stated that the crash was caused by multiple factors, resulting from erroneous crew actions during the climb, in instrument conditions, with unreliable airspeed caused by the icing of all three pitot probes, which led to a loss of control in flight. Systematic failures within Saratov Airlines and Russian aviation authorities enabled the crash by producing a low safety culture in the airline, a poor safety management system, illegal issuance of certificates to pilots, and a lack of proper oversight on airliners' training and simulator programs. Investigators listed the crew's decision to not de-ice the pitot tubes and their haste following the aircraft's late arrival as the contributing factors of the crash.

Antonov responded by rejecting the framing of the final report, stating that the blame should be attributed to pilot error, as both pilots decided not to turn on the pitot heaters. The company maintained that the subsequent icing of the pitot tubes and the erroneous inputs made by the crew were direct consequences of the pilots’ decision. They also argued that the IAC was not fully correct on their interpretations of the Antonov An-148's system. Based on their position with their proposed official cause (i.e., pilots not switching the pitot tube heaters), Antonov made the same stance as the one that they had made back in 2015 in regard to the Angara Airlines incident, when it rejected a recommendation to establish a procedure for crews to follow in the event of unreliable airspeed during flight. Investigators rebuted Antonov's response and stated that they stood by their decision, refusing to revise their final report.

Similarly, Rosaviatsiya objected to the investigation conclusion. They presented several arguments, including that there were no training violations found, no documented regulatory violation, and that there was no causal link with the crash, as there were no violations. They also pointed out that the IAC didn't issue any recommendations to address the issue, and therefore it was not a real cause. Rosaviatsiya went as far as formally requested the IAC to delete the entire "absence of control over crew training at all levels" text from the final report. The IAC refused to do so, stating that prior to the report's publication, all member parties involved in the investigation, including Rosaviatsiya itself, had signed the report and had no remarks regarding its content. The final report was not revised.

== Aftermath ==
=== Legacy ===
The amount of funds raised by the public was enough for the construction of a memorial dedicated to the victims of the crash. The governor of Orenburg, Yuri Berg, stated that it was up to the next of kin to decide on whether to build a monument and the location of the memorial. A temporary memorial decorated with candles, flowers, photos of the 71 victims, and their names was placed on the planned site for at least 7 years before a monument was constructed. In May 2025, the memorial monument, named "Candle of Remembrance," was unveiled to the public. The monument, a red wall shaped like a wing with plaques bearing the victims' names, was inaugurated following an inter-religious ceremony attended by relatives of the victims and residents of Stepanovskoye.

=== Trial ===
Following the publication of the final report, a criminal case was opened against personnel from Saratov Airlines. Moscow District Court officially charged two airline officials who were responsible for the operation of the airlines. It also charged Captain Gubanov posthumously due to poor professional training and "psychophysical personality traits." Valery's relatives disagreed with the accusations, claiming that he could not have made such a mistake during a routine flight. The charge against Gubanov was later dismissed due to his death. The trial recognized 108 people, including the passengers and crews, as victims of the crash. Prosectors eventually dropped the charges for both airline managers due to the expiration of the statute. However, the decision was not a ground for exoneration, as both defendants were still able to face up to 5-7 years of imprisonment.

== See also ==
- Air France Flight 447
- Tatarstan Airlines Flight 363
- Pakistan International Airlines Flight 8303
