= Lace knitting =

Knitting method with a pattern of holes

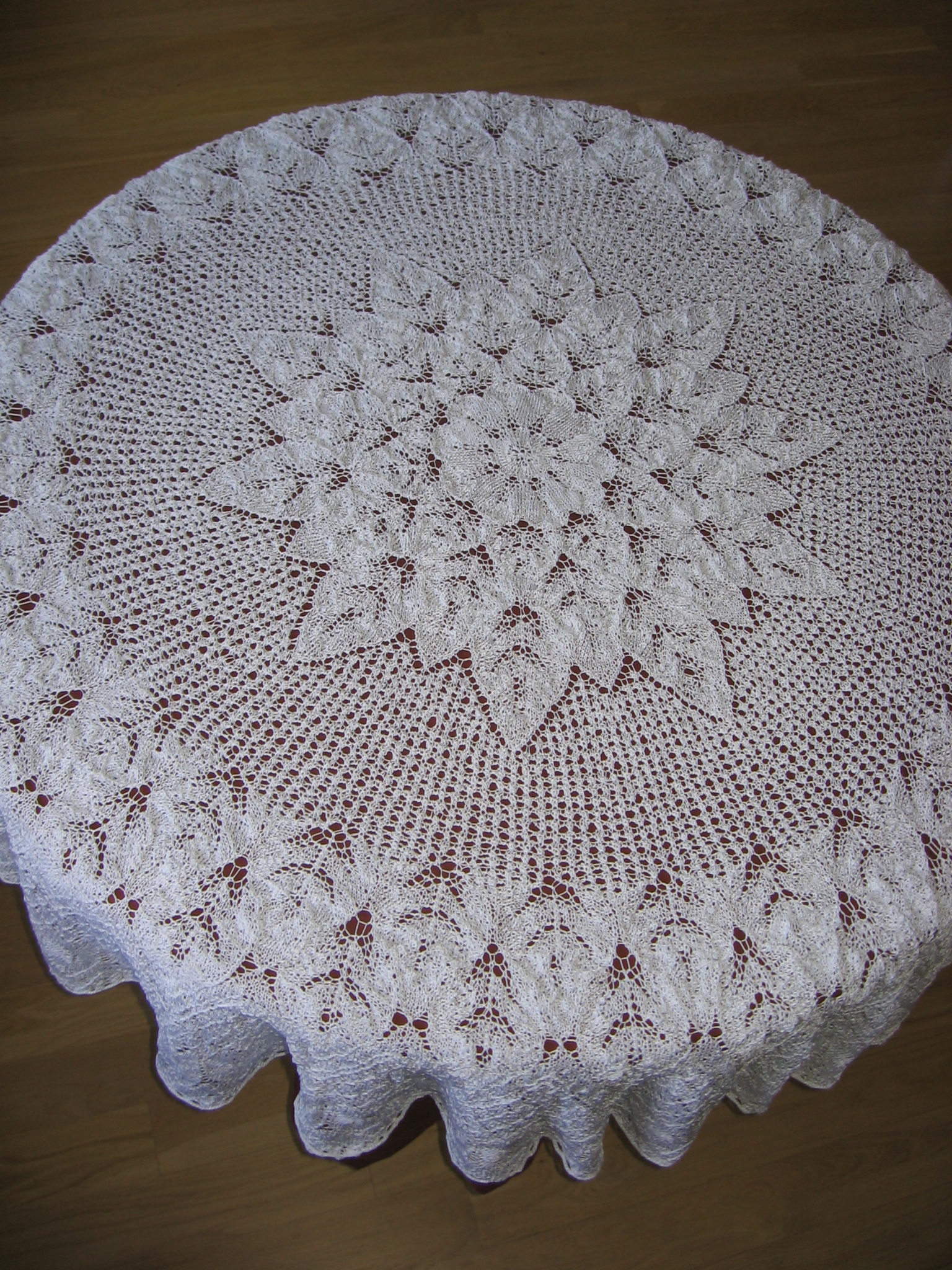
Lace knitting.

Lace knitting is a style of knitting characterized by stable holes in the fabric arranged with consideration of aesthetic value. Lace is sometimes considered the pinnacle of knitting, because of its complexity and because woven fabrics cannot easily be made to have holes. Famous examples include the Orenburg shawl and the wedding ring shawl of Shetland knitting, a shawl so fine that it could be drawn through a wedding ring. Shetland knitted lace became extremely popular in Victorian England when Queen Victoria became a Shetland lace enthusiast. Her enthusiasm resulted in her choosing knitted lacework for presents, for example in c. 1897 when the Queen gave a lace shawl as a present to American abolitionist Harriet Tubman. From there, knitting patterns for the shawls were printed in English women's magazines, and they were copied in Iceland with single ply wool.

Some consider that "true" knitted lace has pattern stitches on both the right and wrong sides, and that knitting with pattern stitches on only one side of the fabric, so that holes are separated by at least two threads, is technically not lace, but "lacy knitting", although this has no historical basis.

Eyelet patterns are those in which the holes make up only a small fraction of the fabric and are isolated into clusters (e.g., little rosettes of one hole surrounded by others in a hexagon). At the other extreme, some knitted lace is almost all holes, e.g., faggoting.

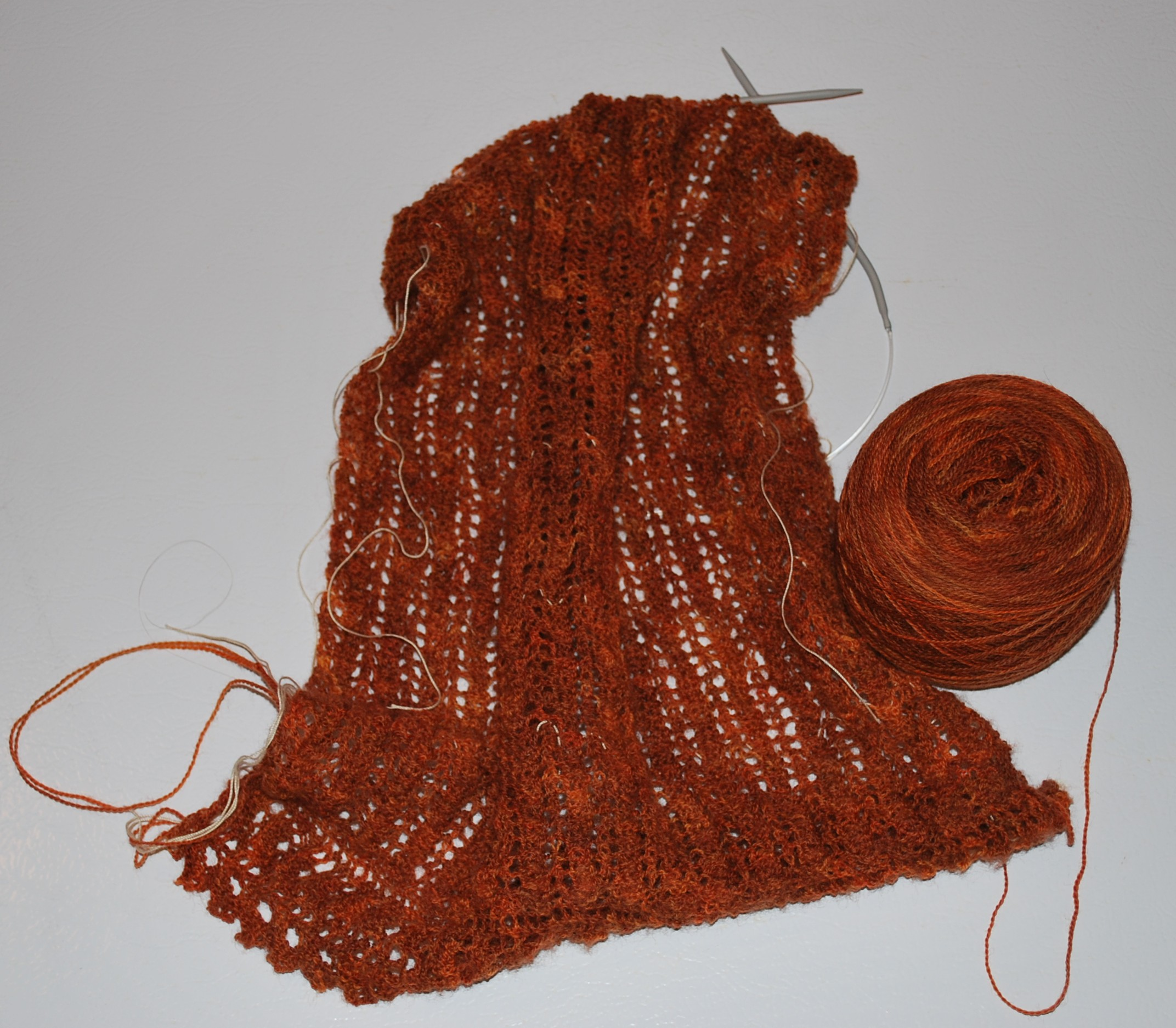
Rectangular lace shawl on the needles. White threads ("lifelines") are strung through the pattern every twenty rows and will be removed upon completion.

Knitted lace with no bound-off edges is extremely elastic, deforming easily to fit whatever it is draped on. As a consequence, knitted lace garments must be blocked or "dressed" before use, and tend to stretch over time.

Lace can be used for any kind of garment, but is commonly associated with scarves and shawls, or with household items such as curtains, table runners or trim for curtains and towels. Lace items from different regional knitting traditions are often distinguished by their patterns, shape and method, such as Faroese lace shawls which are knit bottom up with center back gusset shaping unlike a more common neck down, triangular shawl.

== Technique ==
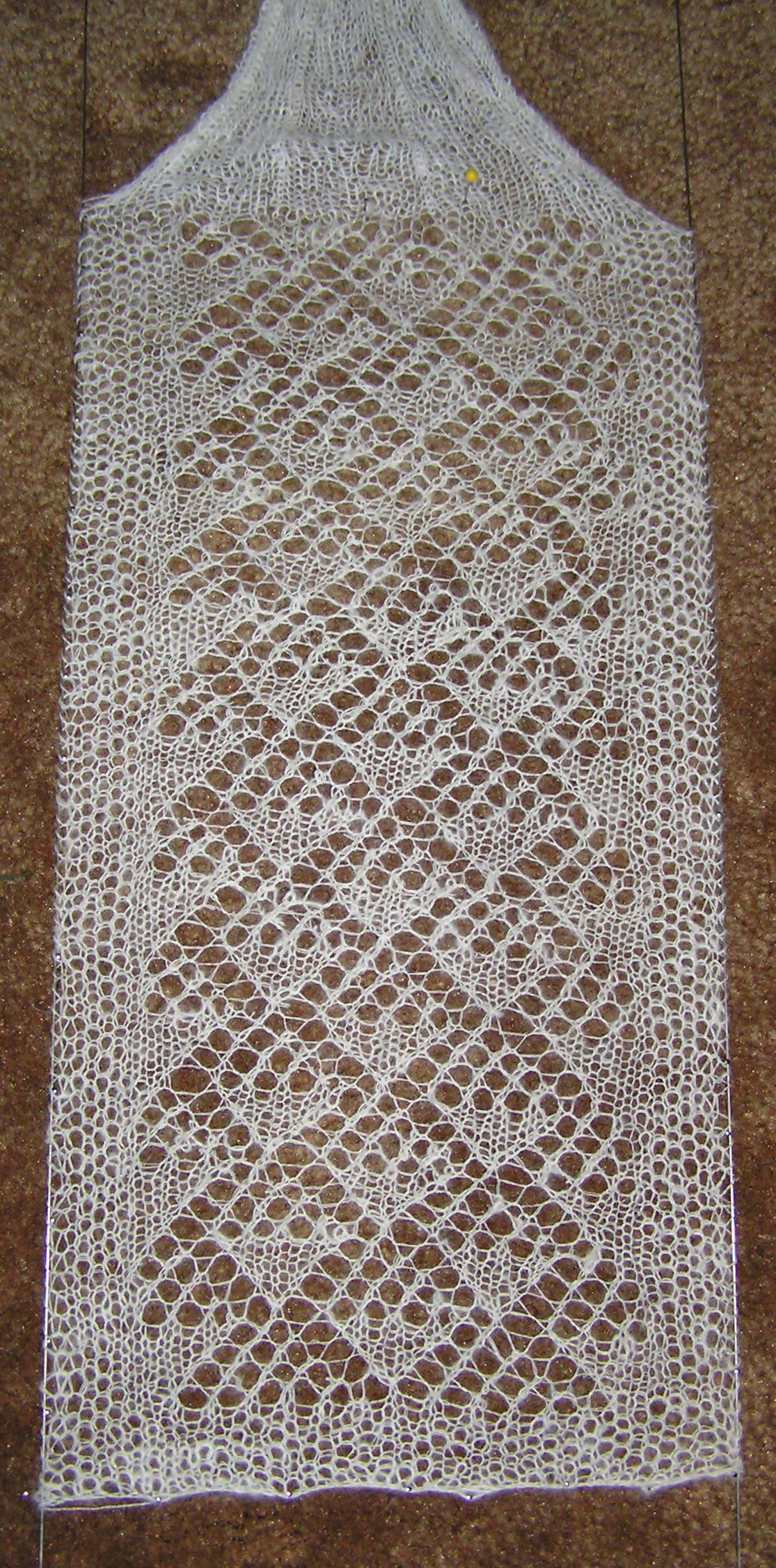
Lace scarf during blocking

A hole can be introduced into a knitted fabric by pairing a yarn over stitch with a nearby (usually adjacent) decrease. If the decrease precedes the yarn over, it typically slants right as seen from the right side (e.g., k2tog, not ssk; see knitting abbreviations). If the decrease follows the yarn over, it typically slants left as seen from the right side (e.g., k2tog tbl or ssk, not k2tog). These slants pull the fabric away from the yarn over, opening up the hole.

Pairing a yarn over with a decrease keeps the stitch count constant. Many beautiful patterns separate the yarn over and decrease stitches, e.g., k2tog, k5, yo. Separating the yarn over from its decrease "tilts" all the intervening stitches towards the decrease. The tilt may form part of the design, e.g., mimicking the veins in a leaf.

There are few constraints on positioning the holes, so practically any picture or pattern can be outlined with holes; common motifs include leaves, rosettes, ferns and flowers. To design a simple lace motif, a knitter can draw its lines on a piece of knitting graph paper; right-slanting lines should be produced with "k2tog, yo" stitch-pairs (as seen on the right side) whereas left-slanting lines should be produced with "yo, k2tog tbl" (or, equivalently, "yo, ssk" or "yo, skp") stitch pairs (again, as seen on the right side). More sophisticated patterns will change the grain of the fabric to help the design, by separating the yarn overs and decreases.

It is common for lace knitters to insert a "lifeline", a strand of contrasting yarn threaded through stitches on the needle, at the end of every pattern repeat or after a certain number of rows. This allows the knitter to rip out a controlled number of rows if a mistake is discovered.

== History and comparison to other laces ==
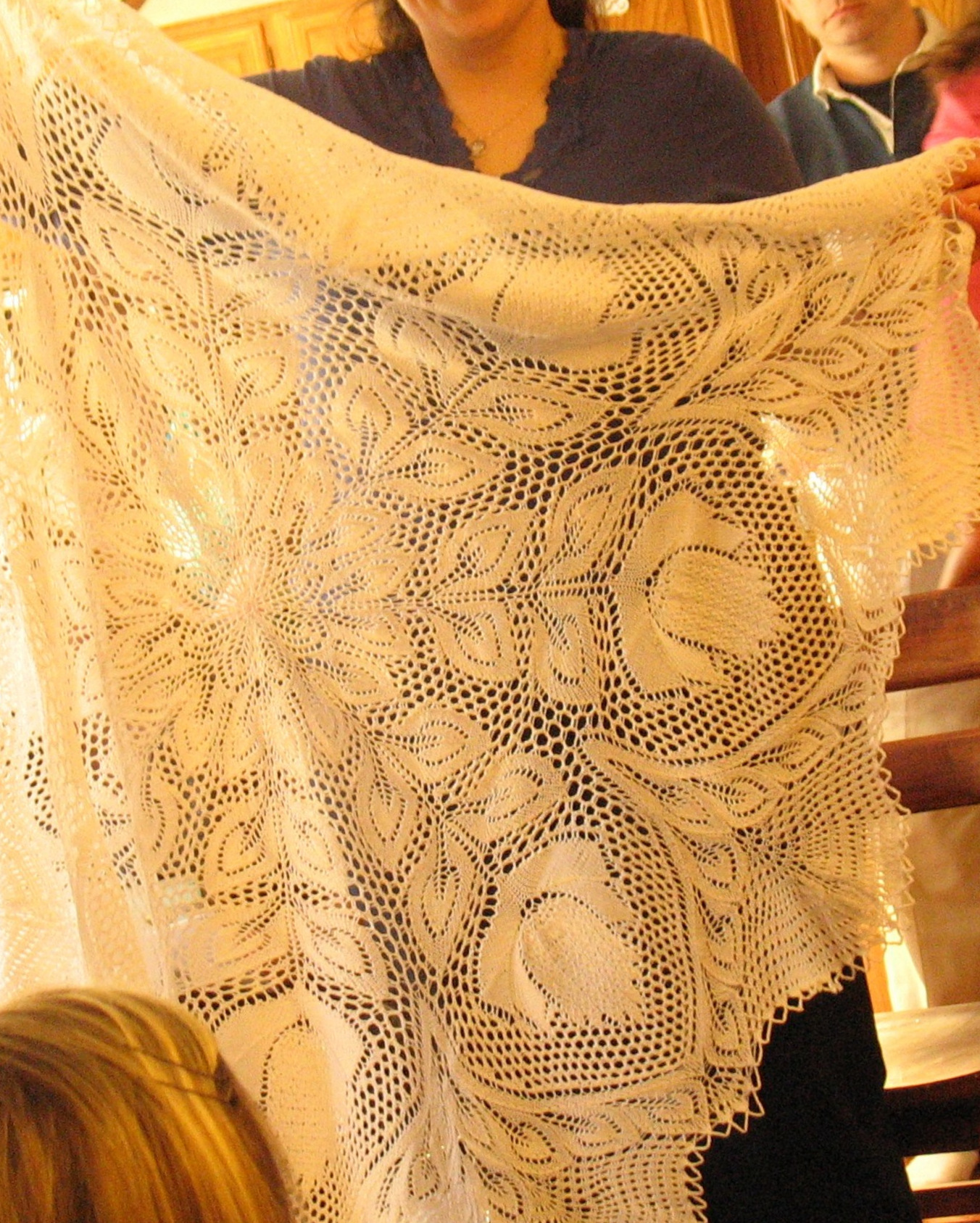
Knitted lace tablecloth based on the pattern "Lyra" by Herbert Niebling

Lace knitting is generally not as fine as other forms of lace, such as needle lace or bobbin lace. However, it is better suited for garments, being softer and much faster to produce.
