= Orsk (air base) =

Airport in Orenburg Oblast, Russia

Orsk
- Orsk, Orenburg Oblast in Russia
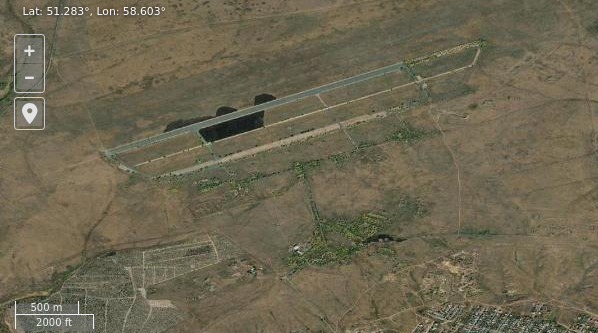
- Satellite imagery of former Orsk air base

Site information
- Type: Air Base
- Owner: Ministry of Defence
- Operator: Russian Air Force

Location
- Shown within Orenburg Oblast Orsk (Russia)
- Coordinates: 51°16′59″N 58°36′12″E

Site history
- Built: 1953
- In use: 1953 - 1998

Airfield information
Runways
Direction	Length and surface
05/23	2,500 metres (8,202 ft) Concrete

Orsk is a former airbase of the Russian Air Force located northeast of Orsk, Orenburg Oblast, Russia,

The base was home to the 750th Training Aviation Regiment between 1953 and 1998 of the Orenburg Higher Military Aviation School of Pilots.

== See also ==
- List of military airbases in Russia
- Orsk Airport
