= Saratov Central Airport =

Airport in Russia

Central Airport
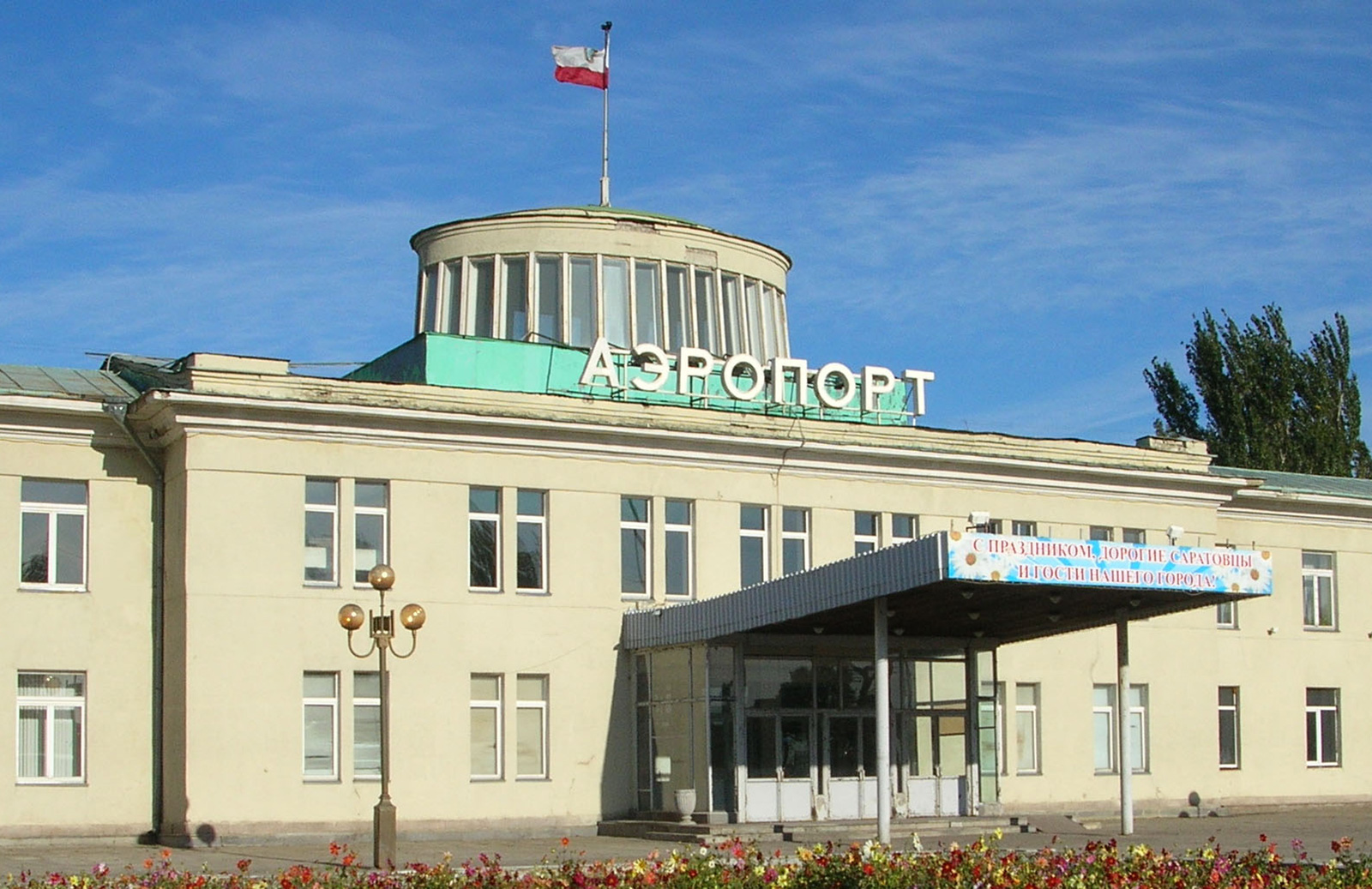
- IATA: RTW; ICAO: UWSS

Summary
- Airport type: Public
- Operator: Saratov Airlines
- Serves: Saratov
- Location: Saratov, Russia
- Closed: 20 August 2019
- Elevation AMSL: 499 ft / 152 m
- Coordinates: 51°33′54.00″N 46°02′48.00″E

Map
- Location of airport in Saratov Oblast

Runways
Direction	Length		Surface
Direction	ft	m	Surface
12/30	7,284	2,220	Asphalt

Statistics (2016)
- Passengers: 433,385

Saratov Central Airport (Russian: Аэропорт Центральный, Aeroport Centraľnyj) (IATA: RTW, ICAO: UWSS) is a defunct airport in Saratov. It was a federal-status international airport located in Saratov's Kirovsky district. It served as the primary base for Saratov Airlines until May 2018. In 2016, the airport recorded total traffic of 433,385 passengers. On 20 August 2019 Saratov Central Airport ceased all operations due to launch of new Saratov Gagarin Airport (now serves as a primary airport for Saratov and Saratov Oblast).

== History ==
Saratov is home to a number of other aviation facilities: Dubki sports aerodrome, Saratov-Sokol military airbase, and Shumeika landing field. Another facility, Saratov South Air Base, was closed in 2010.

On 30 May 2018, Russian Aviation Authority announced that Saratov Airlines has ceased operations due to its massive aviation law violation, found during the unplanned airline monitoring, that occurred after the plane crash in February. That brought a risk to the airport with many flights cancellations, because it is owned by the airline. It is one of the two airlines operating out of the airport, the other one is Aeroflot, that also operated flights to and from Saratov. Nevertheless, after the airline ceased all operations, the airport continues to operate the only flights to Moscow by Aeroflot, increasing the frequency. The airport served its last flight on 20 August 2019, 5:00.

== Former airlines and destinations ==
All flights were ceased on 20 August 2019. As of July 2019 Saratov Central Airport served following destinations:

Airlines	Destinations
Aeroflot	Moscow–Sheremetyevo
Pegas Fly	Moscow–Sheremetyevo, Saint Petersburg; Seasonal: Simferopol, Sochi; Seasonal charter: Antalya
RusLine	Seasonal: Moscow-Vnukovo, Sochi
S7 Airlines	Moscow-Domodedovo
Utair	Seasonal charter: Surgut

== See also ==
- List of airports in Russia
