= Beder Yusupova =

Soviet Bashkiria actress, teacher (1901–1969)

Beder Akhmetovna Yusupova, (pseudonym Lucy, Bashkir: Бәҙәр Ахмет ҡыҙы Йосопова, Russian: Бедер Ахметовна Юсупова; 21 December 1901 – 30 August 1969) was a Soviet Bashkiria actress, and teacher.

She was awarded the People's Artist of the Bashkir ASSR (1940), and Honored Artist of the RSFSR (1944). Yusupova was among the first actresses of the Bashkir State Theater in Sterlitamak in Bashkortostan, Russia.

== Life ==
Beder Akhmetovna Yusupova was born on December 21, 1901, in the city of Orsk, Orenburg Governorate, Russian Empire. She graduated from a teacher training course in her hometown in 1915, and began teaching at the Tatar school in Orsk. The following year, under the pseudonym Lucy, she made her debut on the stage of the amateur theater at the Youth Union in the dramatic etude "The Lost Woman" (based on the play by I. Bogdanov), where she performed the roles of Galiyabanu, Magrufkamal ("Galiyabanu" and "A Village Holiday", M. Faizi), and also began performing with performances of Bashkir folk dances and songs.

Between 1919 and 1929, she was a teacher in the Bashkir Republic schools, and worked in departments of the Bashkir People's Commissariat of Education.

From 1926 until the end of her life, she was an actress in the First Bashkir State Theater troupe. She often played in theaters, appeared on radio and television with performances of kubairy (a genre in Bashkir poetry), Bashkir dances and songs.

During World War II, she participated in concerts at the front.
