= Stepanovskoye, Ramensky District, Moscow Oblast =

Stepanovskoye Степановское
- Urban-type settlement
- St Isaac Church's in Stepanovskoye
- Interactive map of Stepanovskoye
- Location of Stepanovskoye Stepanovskoye (Moscow Oblast)
- Coordinates: 55°17′04″N 38°25′16″E
- Country: Russia
- Federal subject: Moscow Oblast
- Administrative district: Ramensky District
- Elevation: 140 m (460 ft)

Population (2010 Census)
  - Total: 199
  - Estimate (2010): 199 (0%)
- Time zone: UTC+3 (MSK)
- Postal code: 140168
- OKTMO ID: 46648488176

Stepanovskoye is an urban-type settlement in Ramensky District of Moscow Oblast. Its population was 199 in 2010.

== Geography ==
Stepanovskoye is located in Ramensky District, approximately 31 kilometres (19 mi; 17 nmi) south of Ramenskoye. The village is 140 metres (460 ft) above sea level. The Olkhovka River is located 4 kilometres (2.5 mi; 2.2 nmi) north of the village. It has three streets: Pervaya, Vtoraya, and Tretyaya. The Nadezhda gardening partnership (SNT) and the Yasnaya Polyana dacha settlement (DP) are within its jurisdiction. The village of Argunovo is located nearby.

== History ==
The church complex in Ramenskoye is a monument of Naryshkin Baroque.

In 1926, Stepanovskoye was the center of the Stepanovo Village Council within Chaplyzhenskaya Volost, Bronnitsky Uyezd, Moscow Governorate.

From 1929 to 1959, it was a settlement within the Bronnitsy District of Kolomensky District, Moscow Oblast. On June 3, 1959, the Bronnitsy District was abolished, and the village was transferred to the Lyuberetsky District. It was transferred to the Ramenskoye District in 1960.

The village was part of the Ulyanino Rural District of Ramensky District prior to the 2006 municipal reform.

On February 11, 2018, Saratov Airlines Flight 703 crashed in the village, killing all 71 people on board.

== Population ==
In 1926, the village had a population of 462 people (164 men, 298 women) in 111 households, 109 of which were peasant households. According to the 2002 census, the population was 171 (79 men, 92 women).

== Attractions ==
Two churches are located in the village: The Church of the Annunciation of the Most Holy Theotokos and the Church of Saint Isaac of Dalmatia.

== Bibliography ==
- Averyanova, Mariaa Grigoryevna (1995). Край Раменский: очерки краеведа [The Ramenskoye Region: Sketches by a Local Historian] (in Russian). Encyclopedia of Russian Villages. ISBN 5-88367-003-2.
