= Stepanovskaya, Vozhegodsky District, Vologda Oblast =

Stepanovskaya Степановская
- Village
- Location within Vologda Oblast Location within Russia
- Coordinates: 60°36′N 40°38′E
- Country: Russia
- Region: Vologda Oblast
- District: Vozhegodsky District
- Time zone: UTC+3:00

Stepanovskaya (Russian: Степановская) is a rural locality (a village) in Yavengskoye Rural Settlement, Vozhegodsky District, Vologda Oblast, Russia. The population was 10 as of 2002.

== Geography ==
Stepanovskaya is located 34 km northeast of Vozhega (the district's administrative centre) by road. Fedyayevskaya is the nearest rural locality.
