= Syuren =

Syuren Сюрень
- Khutor
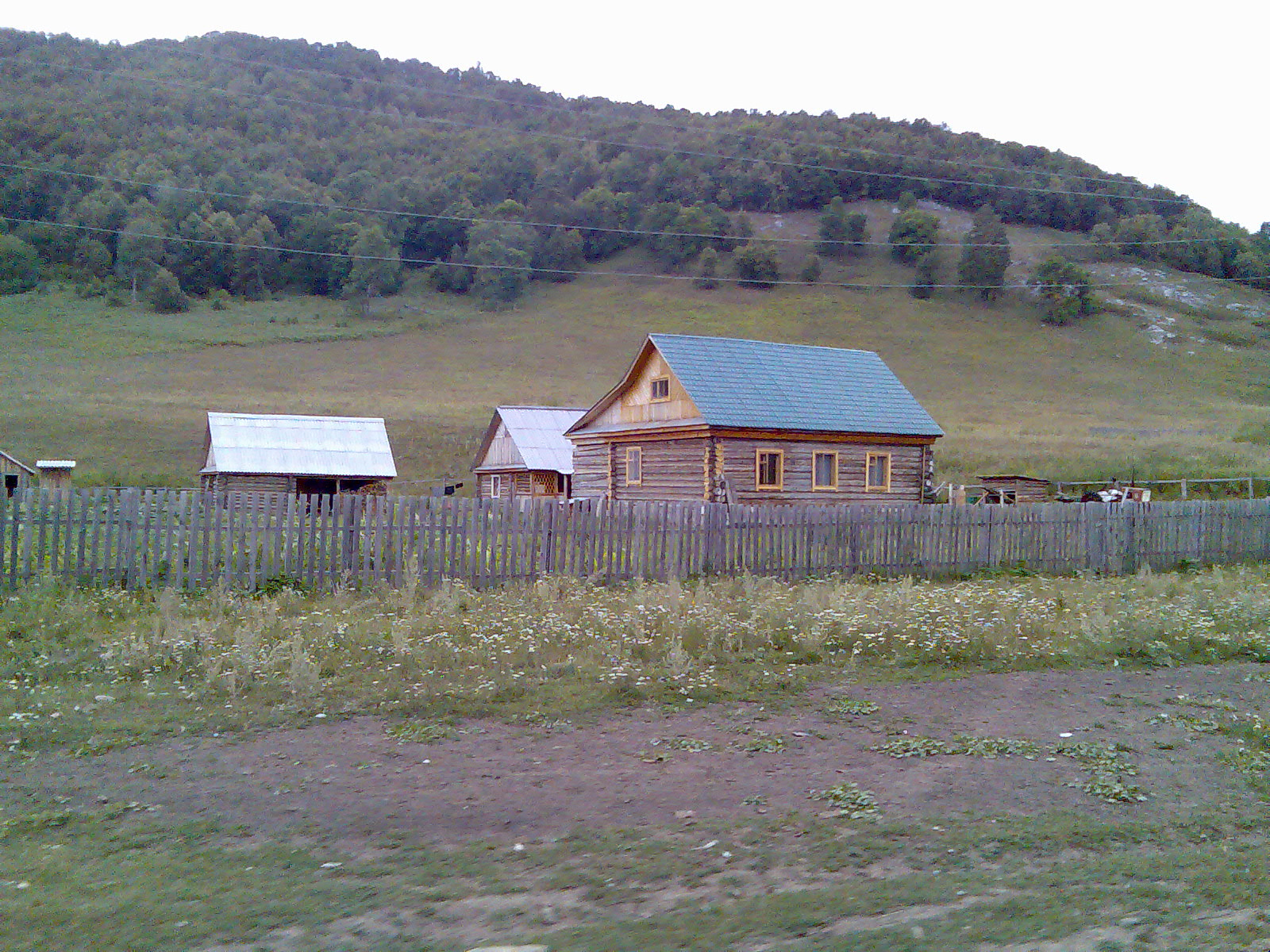
- Building in Suren

- Location within Bashkortostan Location within Russia
- Coordinates: 52°47′N 56°55′E
- Country: Russia
- Region: Bashkortostan
- District: Kugarchinsky District
- Time zone: UTC+5:00

Syuren (Russian: Сюрень; Bashkir: Һүрәм, Hüräm) is a rural locality (a khutor) in Uralsky Selsoviet, Kugarchinsky District, Bashkortostan, Russia. The population was 11 as of 2010. There is 1 street.

== Geography ==
Syuren is located 30 km northeast of Mrakovo (the district's administrative centre) by road. Sygarysh is the nearest rural locality.
