= Blocking (textile arts) =

Process in handmade textile production

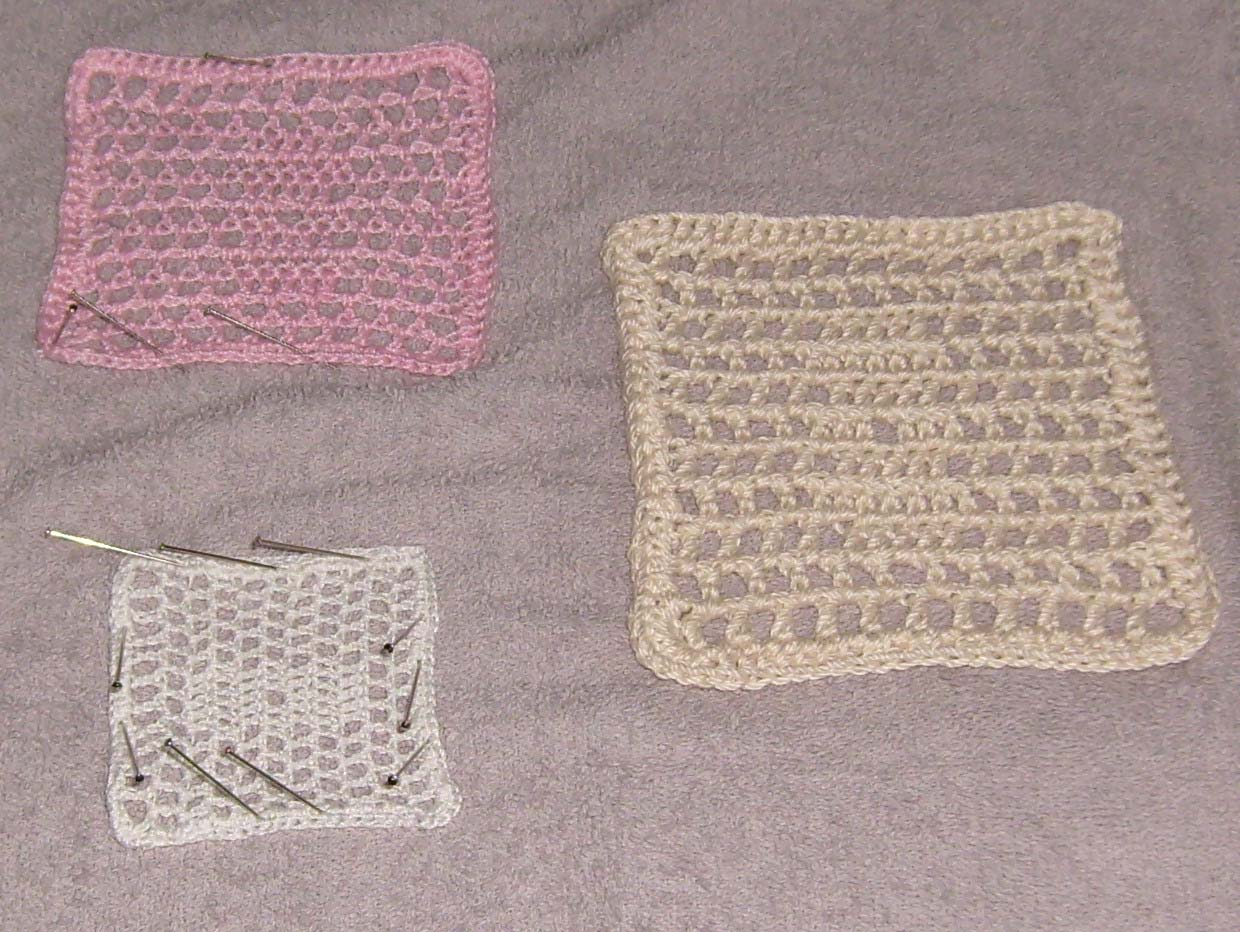
Crochet samples during blocking. After soaking in hot water these items were shaped and laid to dry on a towel. Pins hold some examples in the desired shape.

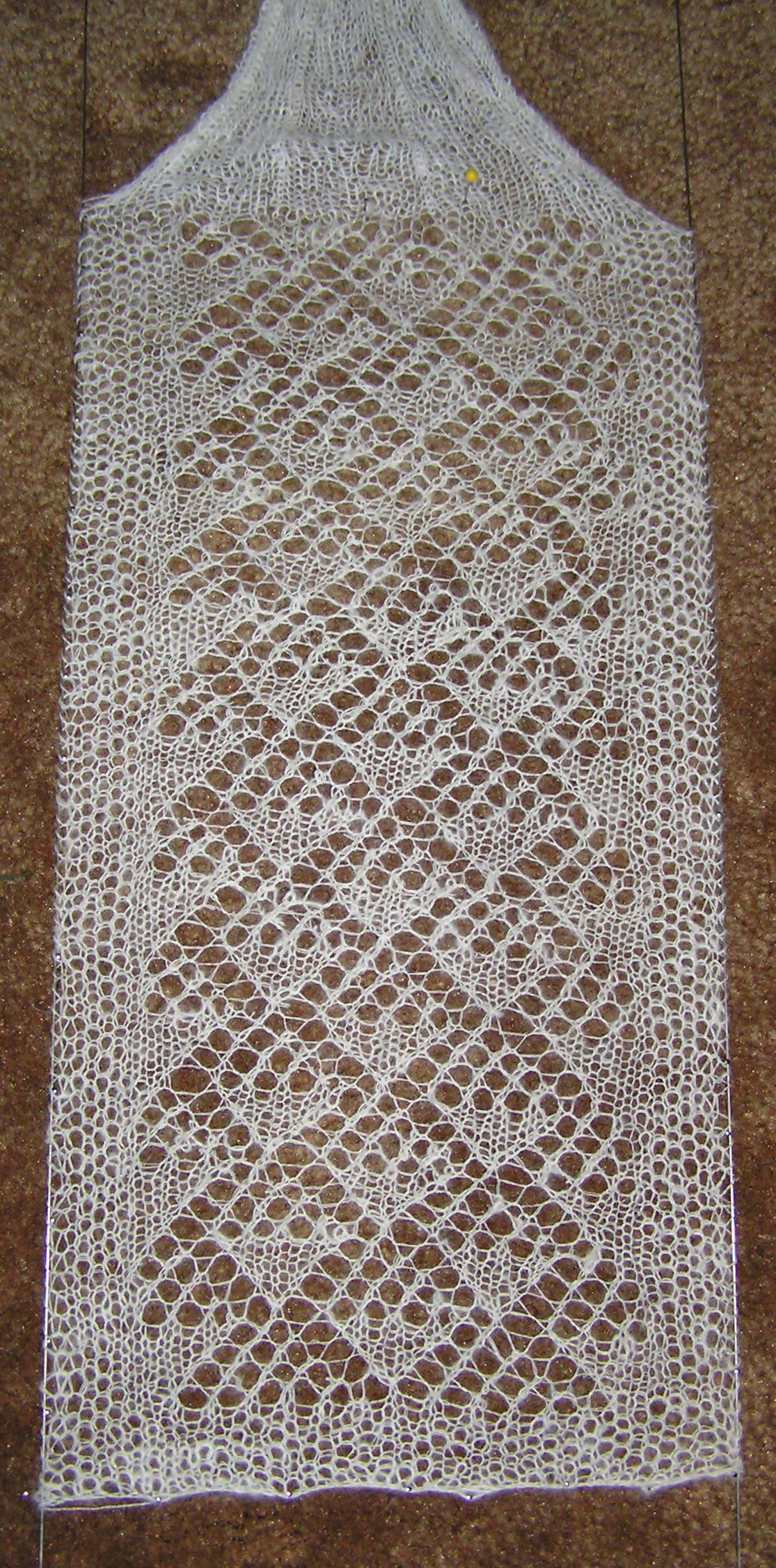
Knitted scarf during blocking

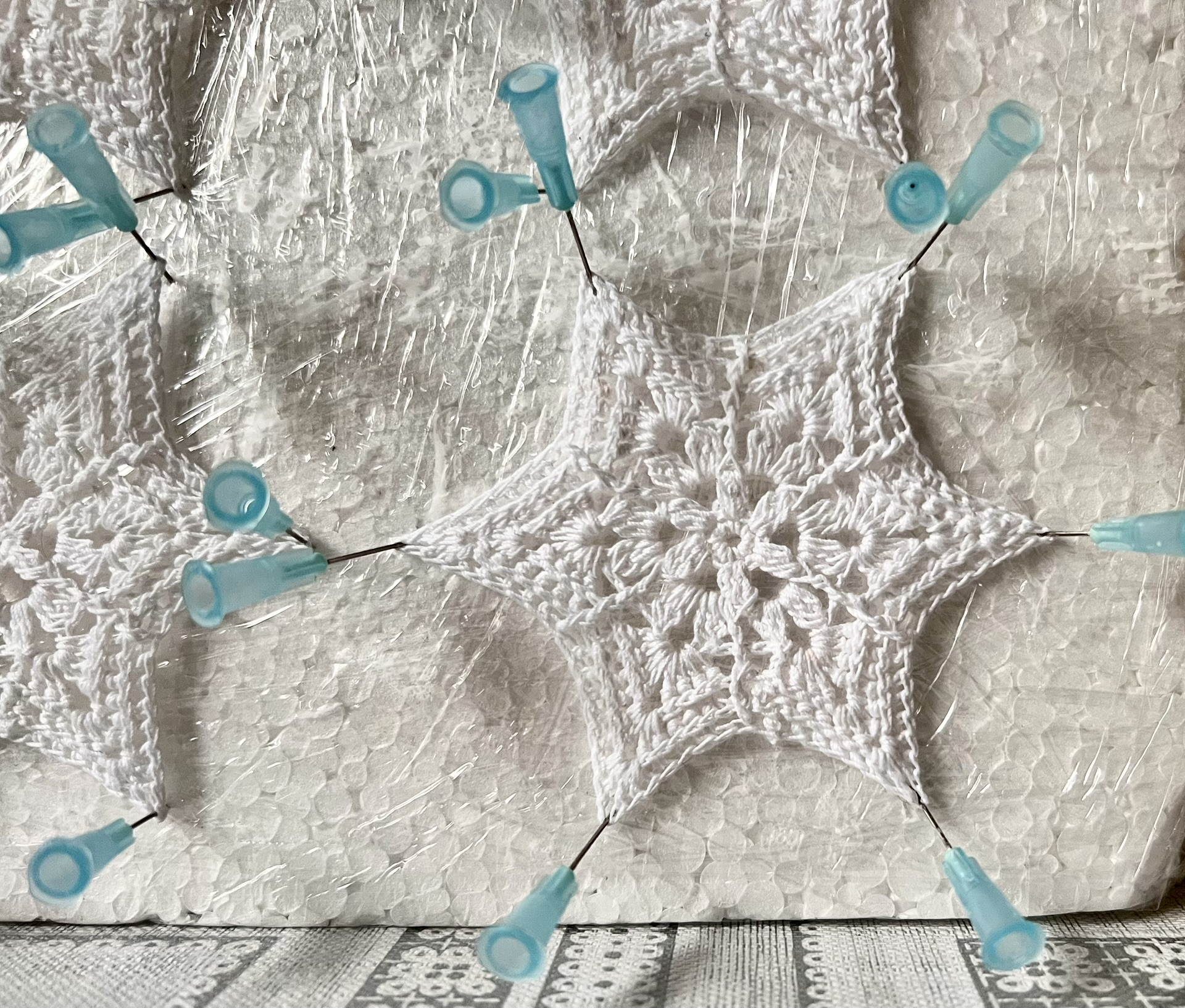
Crochet snowflake, blocked on styrofoam, attached with injection needles

In knitting, crochet and other handmade textile arts, blocking is a final stage of handmade textile production that adjusts the shape and size of the finished piece. Not all pieces need blocking; however, blocking is standard for lace work and is not uncommon in sweaters, socks, and other solid projects. Through heat and moisture, blocking sets the stitches and standardizes the final dimensions, and may enhance the drape. Hand manufacture places natural stresses on fabrics that may result in deviations from their intended shape and size. Blocking is only effective on natural fibres but a technique called killing may be used on synthetic fibres to achieve an effect similar to blocking.

The degree of malleability is determined by the type of yarn used, with wool providing the most flexibility. For projects that are produced in sections or piecework, blocking is normally done prior to final assembly, and may be repeated after final construction.

== Blocking methods ==
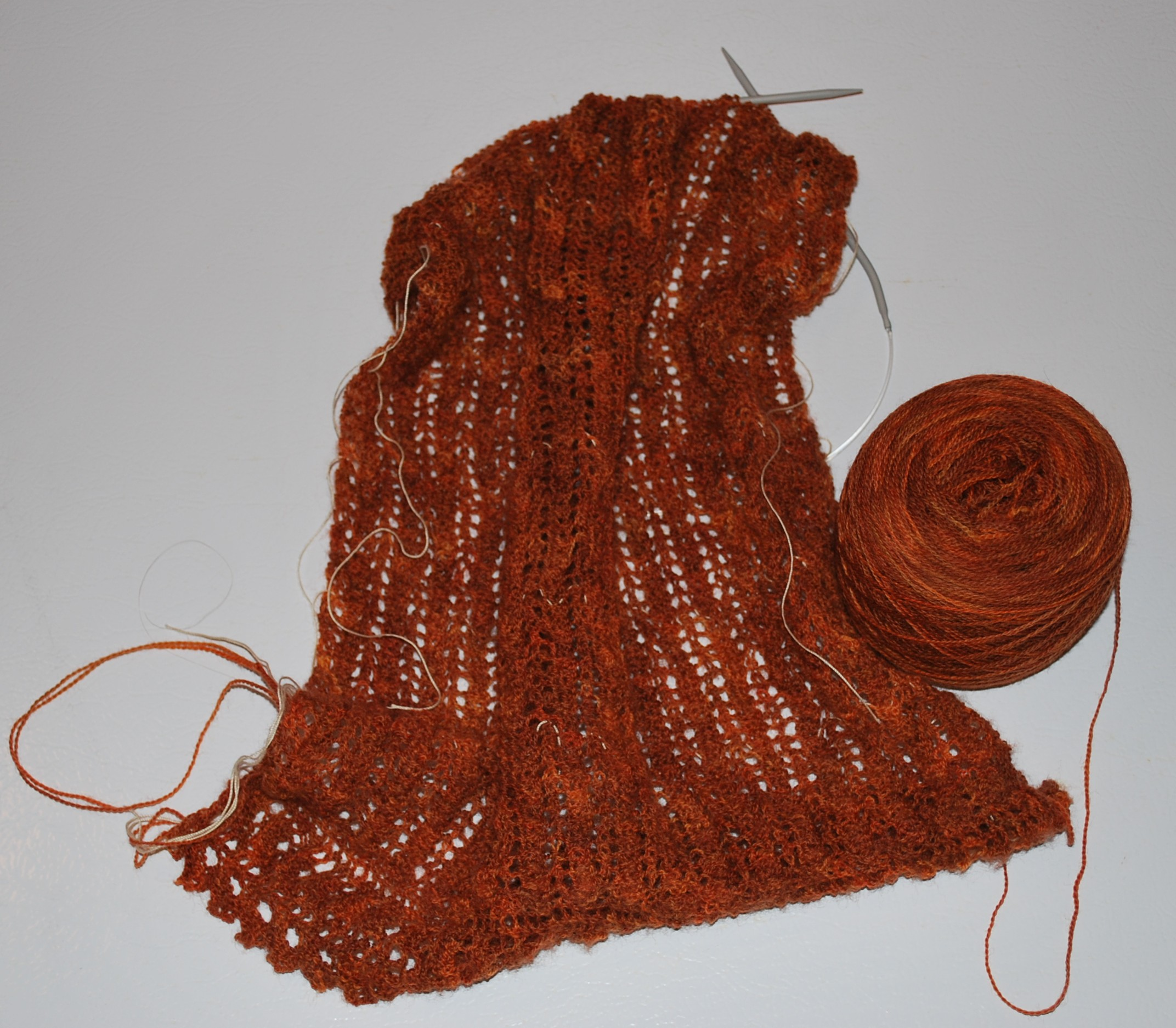
Unblocked lace stole still on the needles. This item will expand significantly after pinning and blocking.

Blocking can be done in several different ways. Depending on the method, the crafter may use rustproof pins, blocking wires, blocking combs, wool wash, a wash basing or sink, a spray bottle, a steamer, or a steam iron. A stable flat surface, measuring tape, and towels are standard and some prefer to also use blocking mats or a blocking board. Handmade socks are typically blocked on sock blockers. Fibres that tolerate water well may be wet blocked, shaping moist fabric into the desired shape and then allowing it to air dry. Cold blocking (or spray blocking) uses no heat and less water to achieve the same result by spraying water upon the material instead of immersing the fabric. Steam blocking uses a steamer or steam iron, but without applying direct pressure to the item.

=== Wet blocking ===
Wet blocking is done by saturating a garment in warm water and allowing it to dry. Some items (especially lace) are stretched while wet with the use of pins and/or blocking wires, while others may be gently shaped without stretching. A lot of knitters will also add some type of wool wash in order to clean the finished garment simultaneously.

=== Steam blocking ===
Steam blocking is done by hovering a hot, steaming iron over the fabric. Hovering the iron about 1 or 2 inches above the fabric flattens the stitch, makes it thinner, and allows it to hold its shape better. This is the only method that works for blocking synthetics, like acrylic.

=== Spritz/cold/spray blocking ===
Spritz blocking involves spraying the garment with water. This relaxes the fibres more than steam blocking but less than wet blocking. Most often, a spray bottle is used.

=== Sock blocking ===
Sock blocking involves wetting the garment using wet or spray blocking techniques with water. The socks are then placed on sock blockers, which should be sized to match the finished sock dimensions. The blockers are then left to dry flat or hung up on a hook.

=== Killing ===
It is possible to set synthetic fibres through a process known as "killing", wherein the item is pinned in place and carefully steamed to achieve a very slight controlled melt of the fibres. Killed fabrics are permanently set and cannot be returned to their original form through washing.

=== Applications ===
- Patchwork
