= Stepanovskoye, Vologda Oblast =

Stepanovskoye Степановское
- Village
- Location within Vologda Oblast Location within Russia
- Coordinates: 59°15′N 40°57′E
- Country: Russia
- Region: Vologda Oblast
- District: Mezhdurechensky District
- Time zone: UTC+3:00

Stepanovskoye (Russian: Степановское) is a rural locality (a village) in Sheybukhtovskoye Rural Settlement, Mezhdurechensky District, Vologda Oblast, Russia. The population was 10 as of 2002.

== Geography ==
Stepanovskoye is located 23 km southwest of Shuyskoye (the district's administrative centre) by road. Nikolskoye is the nearest rural locality.
