= Orsk =

City in Orenburg Oblast, Russia

Orsk Орск
- City
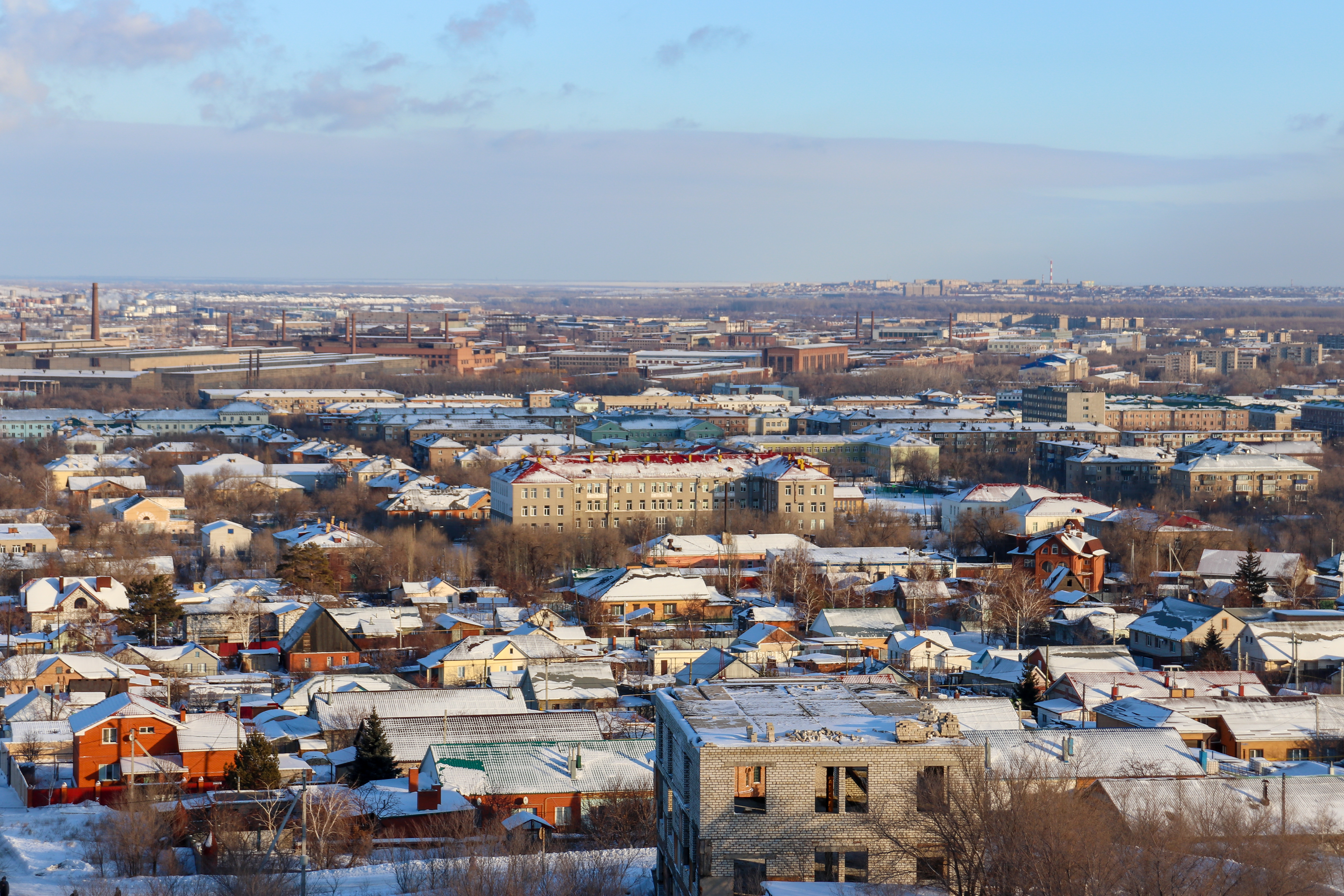
- View of the city, January 2020

- Flag Coat of arms
- Interactive map of Orsk
- Location in Orenburg Oblast Location in Russia Location in Europe
- Coordinates: 51°12′N 58°34′E
- Country: Russia
- Federal subject: Orenburg Oblast
- Founded: 1735
- City status since: 1865

Government
  - Body: City Duma
  - Mayor: Artyom Vorobyov
- Elevation: 200 m (660 ft)

Population (2010 Census)
  - Total: 239,800
  - Estimate (2025): 185,362 (−22.7%)
  - Rank: 80th in 2010

Administrative status
  - Subordinated to: City of Orsk
  - Capital of: City of Orsk

Municipal status
  - Urban okrug: Orsk Urban Okrug
  - Capital of: Orsk Urban Okrug
- Time zone: UTC+5 (MSK+2)
- Postal code: 4624xx
- Dialing code: +7 3537
- OKTMO ID: 53723000001
- Website: www.orsk-adm.ru

Orsk (Russian: Орск) is the second largest city in Orenburg Oblast, Russia, located on the steppe about 100 kilometers (62 mi) southeast of the southern tip of the Ural Mountains. The city straddles the Ural River. Population: 239,800 (2010 census); 250,963 (2002 census); 270,711 (1989 Soviet census). It lies adjacent to the Kazakhstan–Russia border.

== Geography ==
The city is located where the Ural River turns from south to west and where the Or River comes in from the southeast (hence the name). It was part of the Orenburg Line of forts.

== History ==
Orsk was founded (as Orenburg) in 1735 in the process of the Russian colonization of Bashkiria and the Southern Ural region. The first settlement was founded by an expedition headed by Ivan Kirilov as a military fortification at the Mount Preobrazhenskaya on the left bank of the Yaik River (presently Ural River). Originally called Orenburg, its name was changed to Orsk in 1739. In 1743, the name of Orenburg was transferred to the town which is now known under this name; it is located 250 kilometers (160 mi) west of Orsk. At its foundation it marked a southeastern projection of European Russia toward the steppes of Central Asia. It housed an exchange post and Russian customs that dealt with traders from Kazakhstan and Asia.

From 22 June 1847 to 11 May 1848, the fortress of Orsk was home of the exiled Ukrainian poet and painter Taras Shevchenko. In 1861, the fortress was decommissioned and became a station of the Orenburg Cossack army. In 1865, Orsk was granted the city status and became the uyezd center in Orenburg Governorate.

The city grew dramatically starting from the 1870s. The population was mainly occupied with trade in cattle and grain, reprocessing of agricultural products, and various arts and crafts. Many women were involved in the business of weaving famous Orenburg shawls. By 1913, the population of Orsk was over 21,000, and by 1917 there were eleven churches and minarets, and sixteen educational facilities of various types and levels. During World War I, some Poles from Warsaw were interned by the Russians in Orsk. During the Russian Civil War, from 1918 to 1919, Orsk withstood a three-month-long blockade and then four times changed hands between warring sides.

In the 1930s, the construction of large industrial enterprises, which drew their resources from the mineral rich soils of the region, started. One of the most notable stones excavated within the Orsk city line in the Mount Polkovnik is jasper. Orsk jasper is revered for its variety of natural designs and colors. All colors except for blue are represented in this stone.

On 3 October 2025, it was reported that the Orsk oil refinery had been hit by Ukrainian long-range drones during the Russo-Ukrainian war.

== Administrative and municipal status ==
The Administrative divisions of Orsk is consisted of 3 districts; Leninsky District, Oktyabrsky District and Sovietsky District

Within the framework of administrative divisions, it is, together with eight rural localities, incorporated as the City of Orsk—an administrative unit with the status equal to that of the districts. As a municipal division, the City of Orsk is incorporated as Orsk Urban Okrug.

== Demographics ==
Historical population

Year	Pop.	±%
1861	2,183	—
1897	14,000	+541.3%
1926	14,000	+0.0%
1939	66,000	+371.4%
1959	176,214	+167.0%
1970	225,314	+27.9%

Year	Pop.	±%
1979	246,667	+9.5%
1989	270,711	+9.7%
2002	250,963	−7.3%
2010	239,800	−4.4%
2021	189,195	−21.1%

Source: and Census data

== Economy ==
Orsk is the most important industrial center of Orenburg Oblast. The main industries are metallurgy, machine building, petroleum chemistry, food and light industries. The most important enterprises are Yuzhuralnikel, Orsknefteorgsintez (the SAFMAR Orsk refinery) and Yuzhuralmashzavod. Following the dissolution of the Soviet Union, chronic under-investment, sanctions and lack of reforms led to the loss of 50,000 jobs and 30 plants, Forbes.com reported.

=== Transportation ===
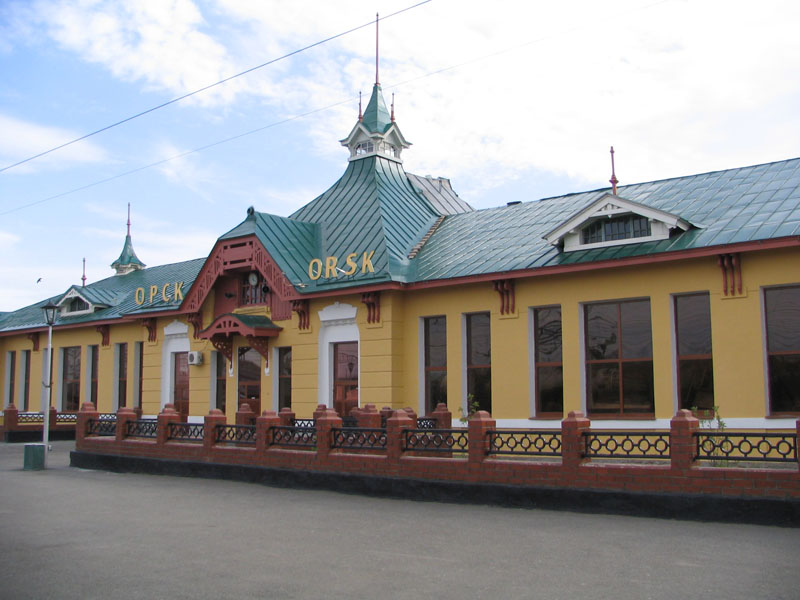
Orsk railway station

The city is served by Orsk Airport and there is an eponymously named former Russian Air Force base located northeast of the city.

== Education and culture ==
A branch of Orenburg State Institute of Management (OSIM) operates in the city. Other than that, there is one major institute in Orsk: Orsk' humanitary-technological institute. There are also a number of different schools and colleges, State Drama Theater, Museum of Local History, Laboratory of Archeological Studies, Children's Art Gallery, Children's Folk Theater "Blue Bird" and a municipal brass band.

Some of the landmarks of industrial Orsk are 40 archeological monuments including ancient settlements, mass and single grave sites. Those that have been excavated became famous in the scientific world. For instance, grave sites in Kumak that date back to the Bronze Age provide convincing evidence to the hypothesis of Eastern European roots of Indo-European peoples.

In the grave sites that date back to the early Iron Age (7th–6th centuries BCE) left by Sarmatian tribes scientists found many ancient items including a clay vessel bearing the name of the Persian ruler Artaxerxes I, the sixth such vessel found in the world.

== Notable people ==
- Yulia Kuzina (born 1976) Russian judoka, born in Orsk
- Beder Yusupova (1901–1969) Soviet Bashkiria actress, and teacher from Orsk
