= Orsk Airport =

Airport in Orsk, Russia

Orsk Airport Аэропорт Орск

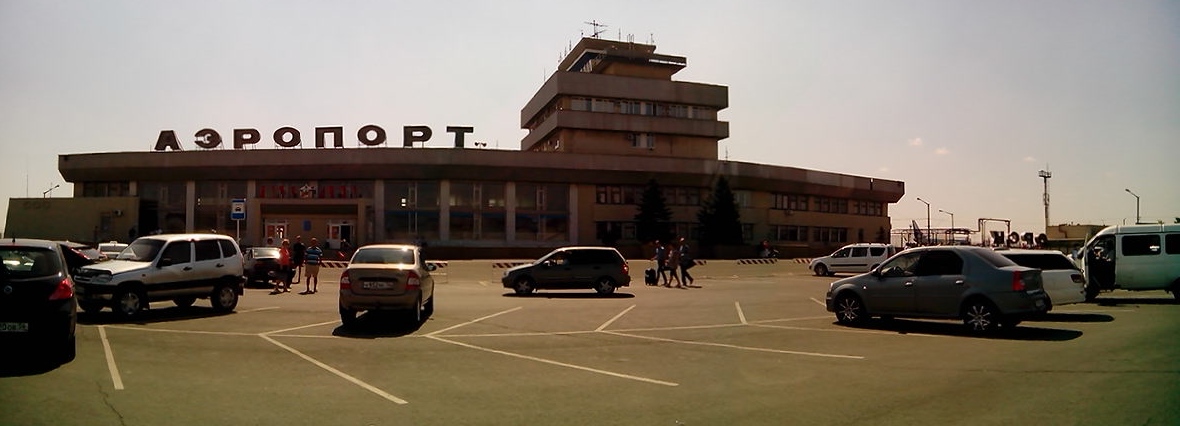
- IATA: OSW; ICAO: UWOR; LID: ОСК

Summary
- Airport type: Public
- Operator: FSUE "Orenburg Airlines"
- Serves: Orsk
- Location: Orsk, Russia
- Opened: 1958
- Elevation AMSL: 909 ft / 277 m
- Coordinates: 51°4′18″N 58°35′48″E
- Website: http://aviaorsk.ru

Map
- Location of airport in Orenburg Oblast

Runways
Direction	Length		Surface
Direction	m	ft	Surface
07/25	2,911	9,550

Orsk Airport (Russian: Аэропорт Орск) (IATA: OSW, ICAO: UWOR) is an international airport in Russia located 16 km (10 mi) south of Orsk. It services medium-sized airliners. The terminal building is located around 3 km from the border to Kazakhstan, with some equipment located in Kazakhstan.

== History ==
The airport was established in 1958.

On 9 April 1960 this was a refueling stop for Mikoyan-Gurevich MiG-19 fighter jets from Sverdlovsk attempting to intercept one of Gary Powers' U-2 flights, however one of the MiG-19s crashed on approach to Orsk.

The modern airport building was built in 1982 and the modern artificial runway was laid in 1987.

The airport was the destination of Saratov Airlines Flight 703, which crashed killing 71 people in February 2018.

== Airlines and destinations ==
Airlines	Destinations
Aeroflot	Moscow–Sheremetyevo
Ikar	Saint Petersburg; Seasonal: Sochi

== See also ==
- List of airports in Russia
