= List of accidents and incidents involving the Douglas DC-6 =

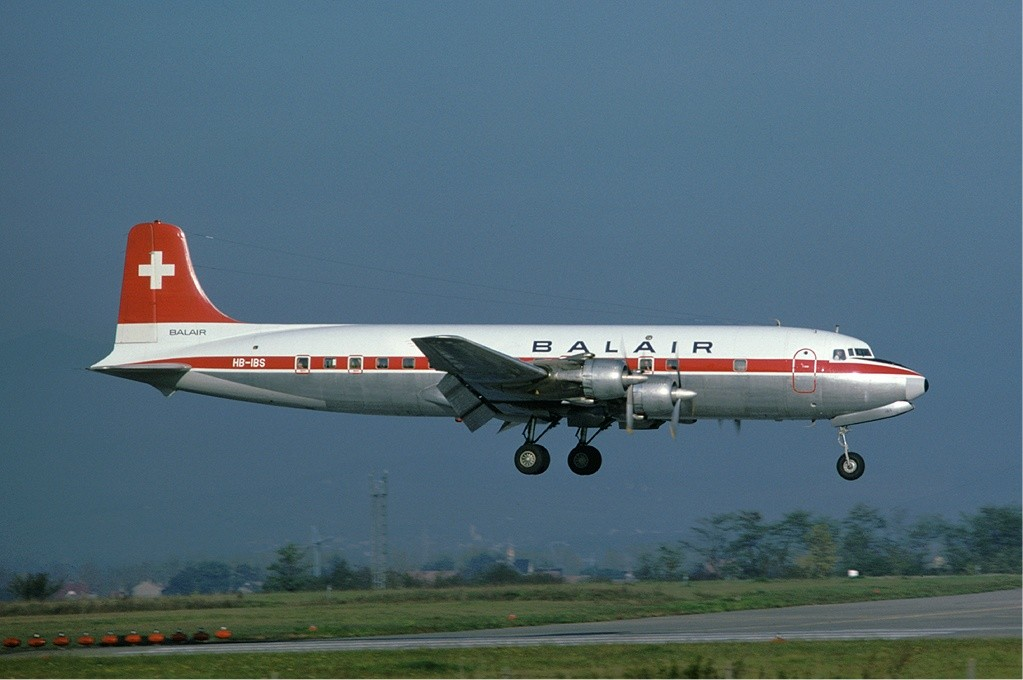
Douglas DC-6B of Swiss airline Balair in 1976

The Douglas DC-6 is a piston-powered airliner and transport aircraft built by the Douglas Aircraft Company from 1946 to 1958. Originally intended as a military transport near the end of World War II, it was reworked after the war to compete with the Lockheed Constellation in the long-range commercial transport market. More than 700 were built and many still fly today in cargo, military and wildfire control roles.

The DC-6 was known as the C-118 Liftmaster in United States Air Force service and as the R6D Liftmaster in United States Navy service prior to 18 September 1962, after which all U.S. Navy variants were also designated as the C-118 under the 1962 United States Tri-Service aircraft designation system.

== Notable accidents and incidents ==
=== 1940s ===
October 24, 1947
United Airlines Flight 608 crashed near Bryce Canyon, Utah while attempting an emergency landing after an inflight fire broke out, killing all 52 on board.
June 17, 1948
United Airlines Flight 624 crashed near Aristes, Pennsylvania after a false fire alarm. All 43 on board were killed.
July 4, 1948
An SAS DC-6 collided in mid-air with RAF Avro York MW248 over Northwood, London, killing all 39 on board both aircraft.
November 29, 1949
American Airlines Flight 157 crashed while attempting a three-engine landing at Love Field; 28 of 46 people were killed.

=== 1950s ===
June 30, 1951
United Airlines Flight 610 struck the side of Crystal Mountain, Colorado after the crew deviated from the flight path for reasons unknown, killing all 50 passengers and crew on board.
August 24, 1951
United Airlines Flight 615 crashed into Tolman Peak and into Dry Gulch Canyon below, 15 miles (24 km) southeast of Oakland, California; all 44 passengers and six crew were killed.
February 11, 1952
National Airlines Flight 101 (a DC-6, N90891) crashed at Newark International Airport after a propeller reversed in flight, killing 29 of 63 on board and four on the ground.
March 22, 1952
KLM Flight 592, a DC-6 (PH-TPJ, Koningin Juliana), crashed in a forest 7 mi northeast of Frankfurt International Airport, killing 45 of 47 on board.
June 28, 1952
American Airlines Flight 910 collided in mid-air with a private single-engine Temco Swift on final approach to Dallas Love Field; both occupants of the Swift were killed but the DC-6 landed safely.
February 14, 1953
National Airlines Flight 470 crashed in the Gulf of Mexico 20 mi SE off Mobile Point, Alabama after it broke up in severe turbulence from a thunderstorm, killing all 46 passengers and crew on board; the aircraft possibly flew into a waterspout.
April 20, 1953
Western Air Lines Flight 636 (a DC-6B, N91303) crashed in San Francisco Bay due to pilot error, killing eight of 10 on board.
July 12, 1953
Transocean Air Lines Flight 512 crashed in the Pacific Ocean 344 miles east of Wake Island for reasons unknown, killing all 58 passengers and crew on board.
October 29, 1953
British Commonwealth Pacific Airlines Flight 304 from Sydney, Nadi (Fiji), Canton Island, and Honolulu crashed in the Santa Cruz Mountains seven miles (11 km) southeast of Half Moon Bay, California, while preparing to land at San Francisco Airport; all 19 on board were killed, including American pianist William Kapell, age 31, who was returning to the United States following a three-month concert tour in Australia.
January 14, 1954
A Philippine Airlines DC-6 (PI-C294) crashed near Rome due to a loss of control caused by possible turbulence, killing all 16 passengers and crew on board.
August 23, 1954
KLM Flight 608, a DC-6B (PH-DFO, Willem Bontekoe), crashed in the North Sea 37 km north of the Dutch coast, killing all 21 passengers and crew on board; the cause was not determined, but cockpit window failure, autopilot failure, an in-flight explosion or an overheating electrical system were suspected.
December 18, 1954
Linee Aeree Italiane Flight 451 (a DC-6B, I-LINE) crashed while attempting to land at Idlewild Airport (now John F. Kennedy International Airport) due to pilot error and fatigue, killing 26 of 32 on board.
February 13, 1955
Sabena Flight 503, a Douglas DC-6 (OO-SDB), crashed on Monte Terminillo, near Rieti, Italy; all 29 on board died, including actress and 1953 Miss Italia winner Marcella Mariani.
March 22, 1955
US Navy R6D-1 Liftmaster 131612 crashed into Pali Kea Peak in the Waianae Range near Honolulu, Territory of Hawaii, after the crew made a navigational error, killing all 66 people on board.
April 4, 1955
A United Airlines DC-6 crashed at MacArthur Airport during a training flight due to pilot error, killing the three crew.
November 1, 1955
A time bomb exploded aboard United Airlines Flight 629, a DC-6 flying over Longmont, Colorado, killing all 44 people on board. A passenger's son was later trialed and convicted of placing the bomb on board.
February 20, 1956
A TAI DC-6B (F-BGOD) crashed 18 mi NE of Cairo International Airport due to crew error and possible fatigue, killing 52 of 64 on board.
July 13, 1956
USAF Flight 441/13, a Douglas C-118A Liftmaster crashed near McGuire Air Force Base, New Jersey, killing all 46 on board. This was the first fatal accident to involve a Douglas Liftmaster.
August 29, 1956
Canadian Pacific Air Lines Flight 307 (a DC-6B, CF-CUP, Empress of Mexico City) crashed at Cold Bay, Alaska after the flaps were fully raised at low altitude while circling, killing 15 of 22 on board.
October 10, 1956
US Navy R6D-1 Liftmaster 131588 disappeared over the Atlantic Ocean with 59 on board; small debris was found 370 mi WSW of Land's End, England.
November 24, 1956
Linee Aeree Italiane Flight 451, a DC-6B (I-LEAD) flying from Rome to New York, crashed on climbout at midnight from Orly Airport, Paris due to an unexplained loss of altitude, killing 34 of 35 people on board. Captain Attilio Vazzoler, 41, was one of the more experienced pilot of the company with more than 10 thousand hours of flight, and the aircraft was new. The reasons of the disaster remain unknown. Conductor Guido Cantelli was one of the passengers that died in this crash.
January 15, 1957
USAF C-118A 53-3263 was destroyed in a hangar fire at McChord AFB along with C-124C Globemaster II 52-1027; a Lockheed T-33 and de Havilland Canada L-20 Beaver were damaged.
February 1, 1957
Northeast Airlines Flight 823, a DC-6A, crashed due to apparent pilot error onto Rikers Island shortly after taking off from LaGuardia Airport in conditions of poor visibility, killing 20 passengers and injuring many more.
February 1, 1958
USAF C-118A 53-3277 collided in mid-air with US Navy Lockheed P2V Neptune 127723 over Norwalk, California, killing 47 of 49 on board both aircraft and one person on the ground.
February 19, 1958
KLM Flight 543, a DC-6 named Jan Huyghen van Linschoten, crashed on approach to Cairo, killing the first officer while the 19 others survived.
August 28, 1958
Northwest Orient Airlines Flight 537, a DC-6B, crashed due to apparent pilot error shortly after taking off from Minneapolis/St Paul Airport resulting in injuries but no deaths.
December 26, 1958
Union Aéromaritime de Transport Flight 736, a DC-6B (F-BGTZ), crashed on takeoff from Salisbury Airport, Rhodesia (now Zimbabwe) after a loss of speed caused by a storm, killing three of 70 on board.
June 22, 1959
A Pan Am DC-6A/B (N5026K, Clipper Panama) caught fire and burned out on takeoff from Shannon Airport after the number four engine fell off. The aircraft was destroyed but all 8 persons on board survived, although six dogs in the cargo hold did not survive. The number one blade (which had been bent) on the number four propeller failed due to fatigue; this placed unbalanced loads on the engine, causing the engine to separate.

=== 1960s ===
January 6, 1960
National Airlines Flight 2511 crashed near Bolivia, North Carolina after a suicide bomb exploded on board, killing all 34 passengers and crew.
February 25, 1960
United States Navy Douglas R6D-1 (DC-6A) 131582 flying from Buenos Aires-Ezeiza to Rio de Janeiro-Galeão Air Force Base collided in mid-air over Guanabara Bay close to the Sugarloaf Mountain with a Real Transportes Aéreos Douglas DC-3 (registration PP-AXD) operating as Flight 751 from Campos dos Goytacazes to Rio de Janeiro-Santos Dumont. The probable causes of the accident are disputed but include pilot error and faulty equipment. Of the 38 occupants of the American aircraft, three survived. All 26 passengers and crew of the Brazilian aircraft died.
September 7, 1960
Aerolíneas Argentinas Flight 205 (a DC-6, LV-ADS) crashed near Salto, Uruguay after the number three propeller separated and struck engine four, causing the aircraft to break up, killing all 31 passengers and crew on board.
September 13, 1960
World Airways Flight 830 (a DC-6A/B, N90779) struck Mount Barrigada near Agana NAS, Guam after the pilot deviated from the departure procedure, killing 80 of 94 on board.
July 19, 1961
Aerolíneas Argentinas Flight 644 crashed 8 mi west of Pardo, Buenos Aires, Argentina due to severe turbulence (some reports state that the aircraft was struck by lightning), killing all 67 passengers and crew in the worst air disaster in Argentine history and the deadliest for the airline.
July 21, 1961
Alaska Airlines Flight 779 (a DC-6A, N6118C) crashed on landing at Shemya, Alaska, after the airport failed to turn the landing lights on, killing all six on board.
September 10, 1961
A President Airlines DC-6 (registration N90773, Theodore Roosevelt) crashed shortly after takeoff from Shannon Airport, killing all 83 people on board in Ireland's worst air disaster.
September 18, 1961
Secretary General of the United Nations Dag Hammarskjöld and 15 other passengers and crew died when their DC-6B (registration SE-BDY) crashed near Ndola, Northern Rhodesia (now Zambia). The plane was owned by Transair Sweden and operated for the UN. A memorial is now sited at the scene of the crash. The cause of the crash has not been conclusively established, but is generally believed to have been pilot error, possibly contributed to by an inaccurate map of the airport environs.
March 15, 1963
Lloyd Aéreo Boliviano Flight 915 (a DC-6B, CP-707) struck Chachacomani Peak, Peru, killing all 39 passengers and crew on board. Probable cause for the accident was determined to be VFR flight below flight plan altitude in marginal weather conditions.
May 3, 1963
An Air Afrique DC-6B (F-BIAO) struck Mount Cameroon due to pilot error, killing all 55 passengers and crew on board.
October 2, 1964
A Union de Transports Aériens DC-6B (F-BHMS) struck Mount Alcazaba, Spain, killing all 80 passengers and crew on board; the cause was never determined.
February 6, 1965
LAN Chile Flight 107 flew into the side of a mountain near the San José Volcano in Chile. All 87 passengers and crew on board died in the crash.
April 23, 1965
Aaxico Airlines Flight 1422A (a DC-6A, N6541C) struck Mount Rainier due to spatial disorientation, killing the five crew.
July 8, 1965
Canadian Pacific Air Lines Flight 21 suffered an explosion in flight and crashed in a forest in British Columbia, killing all 52 on board.
February 18, 1966
A Belgian International Air Services DC-6B (OO-ABG) crashed while on approach to Malpensa Airport, Italy due to pilot error, killing all four passengers and crew on board.
March 10, 1966
A Trans Mediterranean Airways DC-6A (OD-AEL) struck Parnon massif, Greece, killing the five crew (ru).
January 31, 1967
A Saturn Airways DC-6A (N640NA) crashed while on approach to Kelly AFB, Texas, killing the three crew; the cause was never determined.
February 20, 1967
Sahsa Flight 203, had an accident at Toncontin International Airport because of a reverse system failure, in the forced braking, both back tires caught on fire, the DC-6 overran the runway and caught on fire, killing four passengers.
February 24, 1967
Northwest Airlines DC-6B suffered an explosive decompression over New Jersey, necessitating an emergency landing at John F. Kennedy International Airport.
March 9, 1968
French Air Force DC-6B 43748 struck a hill near Saint Denis, Reunion due to crew error, killing 16 of 17 on board.
September 13, 1969
An Ethiopian Airlines aircraft on a scheduled flight from Addis Ababa Bole International Airport to Djibouti-Ambouli Airport was hijacked by three Eritreans belonging to the Eritrean Liberation Front and forced to fly to Aden International Airport. One hijacker was shot on board by an Ethiopian security official. The hijackers were arrested after landing in Aden. The one hijacker shot later perished from his injuries.
September 26, 1969
A Lloyd Aéreo Boliviano DC-6B (CP-698) struck Count Choquetanga, killing all 74 passengers and crew on board; the wreckage was found three days later.
December 8, 1969
Olympic Airways Flight 954 crashed near Keratea, 21 miles (34 km) to the southeast of Athens. The aircraft was on a domestic flight from Chania to Athens/Hellenicon in poor weather. All 85 passengers and five crew members were killed in the worst-ever accident involving the DC-6.
December 22, 1969
An Air Vietnam DC-6B (B-2005) overran the runway while landing at Nha Trang Airport following an in-flight explosion, killing 10 of 77 on board and 24 on the ground.

=== 1970s ===
April 28, 1971
A Brazilian Air Force DC-6B FAB-2414 en route from Manaus Air Force Base to Rio de Janeiro had problems with engine vibrations which forced the crew to return to Manaus. On the ground one of the right hand engines burst into flames. The fire spread to the fuselage causing the death of 16 of the 83 occupants.
December 11, 1973
A USN C-118 flying from NAS Whidbey Island in Washington State to Adak Alaska. All 10 crew members lives were lost.
August 2, 1974
A Conair Aviation DC-6B (CF-PWA) stalled in a turn while attempting to avoid terrain and crashed during a fighting mission near Ashcroft, British Columbia. All 3 crew members lives were lost.
February 8, 1976
Mercer Airlines Flight 901 (a YC-112A, N901MA) crashed 1 mile short of the runway on a golf course attempting to make an emergency landing at Van Nuys Airport, Van Nuys California after a propeller blade on number 3 engine failed and ripped through the fuselage severing hydraulic lines and electrical wiring, then struck the number 2 engine and caused it to fail. Of the 6 persons on board the 3 flight crew members were killed. The airplane was destroyed.
July 24, 1977
Chilean Air Force DC-6B 989 crashed in a swamp while attempting to land at El Tepual Airport amidst heavy rainfall. All seven crew and 31 of the 75 passengers were killed.
December 8, 1978
An LAC Colombia DC-6A/B (HK-1707X) crashed in the Sierra Nevada del Cocuy on a cargo flight from El Dorado International Airport, Bogotá to Trinidad, Casanare. A crew of three was lost with the aircraft.

=== 1980s ===
July 24, 1985
Colombian Air Force DC-6B FAC-902 crashed into the jungle in bad weather 20 mi north of Leticia due to an engine fire, killing all 80 on board.
May 1, 1986
Salvadoran Air Force DC-6 FAS302 crashed on a hill shortly after takeoff from Ilopango International Airport due to a possible engine fire, killing all 37 on board.
July 19, 1986
A French Sécurité Civile operated DC-6 aircraft, converted as waterbomber crashed on Puig de les Canals, in the Albera massif, on July 19, 1986, while working to extinguish a large wildfire that was burning throughout the Alt Emporda county, on the Spanish side of the border, resulting in the death of all 4 crew members.

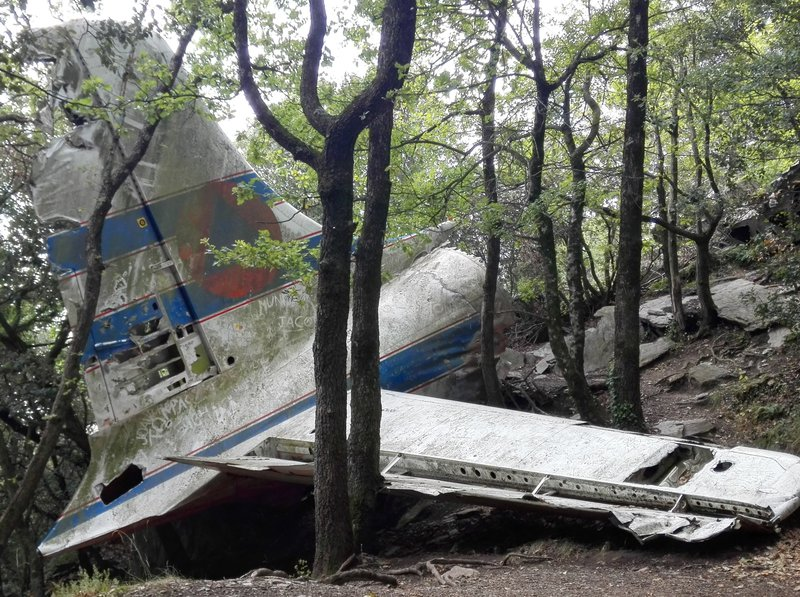
Remnants of a Douglas DC-6 that crashed in Albera Massif, Catalonia, while on waterbombing duties, on July 19th, 1986. Picture taken on 2016.

December 23, 1987
Aeronica DC-6BF (registered YN-BFO) was shot down by machinegun fire and FIM-43 Redeye surface-to-air missile whilst en route a cargo flight from Managua to Panama City, forcing the pilots to execute a water landing in San Juan River. All six persons on board survived, although they were wounded and injured.

=== 1990s ===
November 26, 1993
While attempting to land in bad weather, Allcair Douglas C-118B registration N1597F crashed seven miles off course while attempting to land on the blue ice runway at Patriot Hills airport in Antarctica. There were no fatalities but damage was extensive and the aircraft was written off.

July 20, 1996
Northern Air Cargo Flight 33 (a DC-6A, N313RS) was flying a cargo route (Emmonak-Aniak) when it crashed as it attempted an emergency landing at Russian Mission. The emergency landing was due to the number three engine catching fire. As the plane made its approach and when it was turning to final, its right wing was seen folding up. The plane rolled to the right, nose down and slammed into the ground. All 4 on board were killed. The cause of the crash was determined to be a fatigue failure in the engine and improper procedures regarding an emergency by the pilots on board.

=== 2000s ===
September 25, 2001
Northern Air Cargo Flight 690 (a DC-6BF, N867TA) crashed on landing at Alpine Airstrip in Deadhorse, Alaska. The left wing separated and the aircraft veered off the left side of the runway and was destroyed in a post-crash fire. All three crew on board survived, but the aircraft was written off.

=== 2010s ===
August 1, 2019
Everts Air Cargo Flight 25 (a C-118A, N451CE) struck a berm on landing at Candle 2 airport in Alaska. The right landing gear was torn from the plane, which veered to the right and off the runway, suffering substantial damage. No injuries were reported.
