= Nord Noratlas =

1949 airlifter family by Nord Aviation

Noratlas
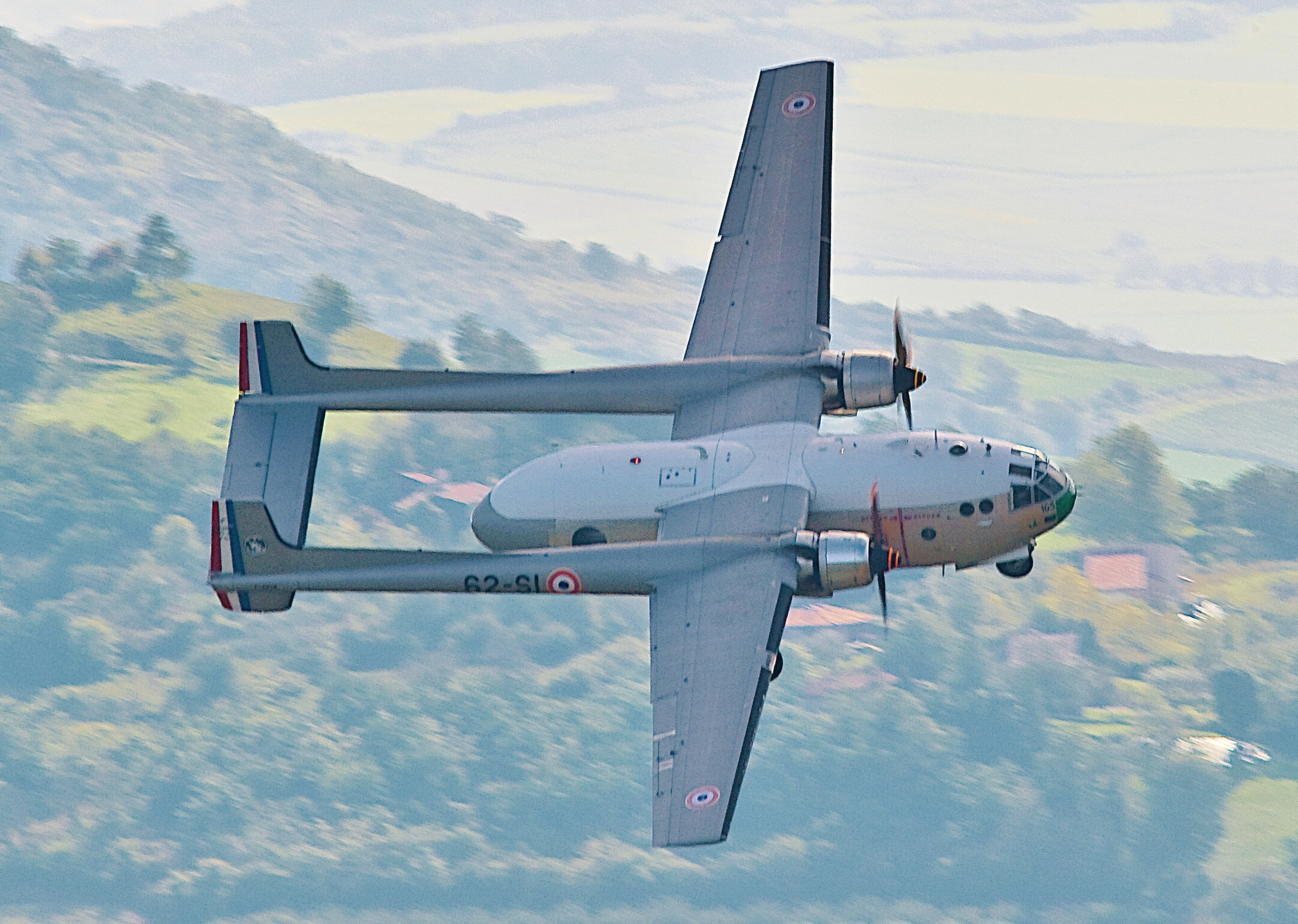
- A French Air Force Nord Noratlas in flight

General information
- Type: Military Transport
- National origin: France
- Manufacturer: Nord Aviation
- Status: Retired
- Primary users: France Germany; Greece; Israel
- Number built: 425

History
- Manufactured: 1949-1961
- Introduction date: 6 December 1953
- First flight: 10 September 1949
- Retired: 1989 (France)

The Nord Noratlas is a dedicated military transport aircraft, developed and manufactured by French aircraft manufacturer Nord Aviation.

Development commenced during the late 1940s with the aim of producing a suitable aircraft to replace the numerous older types that were in service with the Armée de l'Air (French Air Force) which dated back to the Second World War. In response to a competition organised by the Direction Technique Industrielle (DTI), Nord produced their Nord 2500 proposal, which was selected as the most promising. Experiences with the first prototype, powered by Gnome-Rhône 14R engines, did not impress, thus the design was revised as the Nord 2501, powered by the SNECMA-built Bristol Hercules 738/9 engines instead, which was found acceptable. Accordingly, the Noratlas was introduced to service by the Armée de l'Air on 6 December 1953.

Following its adoption by the Armée de l'Air, a number of other operators in both Europe and Africa chose to procure the Noratlas for their own military air services. Having found itself in a similar situation to France, the German Air Force of West Germany chose to adopt the same solution, procuring the type for their own purposes. The Israeli Air Force, the Hellenic Air Force, and the Portuguese Air Force all deployed the Noratlas under combat conditions. Furthermore, operators often found a wide variety of uses for the type, extensively adapting aircraft to suit secondary roles in some cases. The Noratlas was also adopted by a number of civil operators, although most aircraft were flown by military customers. As such, several hundred aircraft were produced during the Noratlas' production run, which lasted over a decade.

== Development ==
Following the end of the Second World War, the French Armée de l'Air was left with two primary transport aircraft: the German Junkers Ju 52, which was produced for some time in France after the end of the conflict, and the American Douglas C-47, (that was derived from the 1930s Douglas DC-3 civil airliner), which had been received from US surplus. While both of these types were typically known for their good service levels, they were by no means modern or particularly large in comparison with newer contemporaries. Both aircraft had suffered from a common set of flaws, such as the traditional tailwheel landing gear configuration, which gave them a nose-up attitude when at rest that complicated the loading and unloading of cargo, relatively restrictive side-loading doors and a limited payload capacity.

In light of these apparent shortcomings, during 1947, the Direction Technique Industrielle (DTI) organised a design competition that sought a medium-weight cargo aircraft which would offer very high operational flexibility. In response to the competition, the Société Nationale de Construction Aéronautique du Nord (SNCAN) produced a response in the form of the proposed Nord 2500. Several other competing French aviation firms, such as Breguet and Sud-Ouest, offered their own designs, the BR-891R Mars and SO-30C, respectively. The Nord 2500, which was designed with rear-opening clamshell doors to allow for easy cargo handling, was considered to be the most promising of the submissions received; according, on 27 April 1948, DTI placed an order for a pair of prototypes to be constructed for evaluation.

On 10 September 1949, the first prototype conducted its maiden flight. It was powered by a pair of Gnome-Rhône 14R engines, each capable of generating 1,600 hp (1,200 kW), which drove three-bladed variable-pitch propellers. However, flight testing soon determined that the first prototype was simply too slow to be useful for most applications. As such, on the second prototype, the 14Rs were replaced by a pair of SNECMA-built Bristol Hercules 738/9 engines, capable of producing 2,040 hp (1,520 kW), along with a new four-bladed Rotol propeller arrangement. The revised model was rechristened as the Nord 2501. Having been suitably impressed by its performance following the improvements, DTI decided to order three more pre-production aircraft to the Nord 2501 standard. These pre-production aircraft underwent extensive flight testing, which included a series of fly-offs against the similar American Fairchild C-82 Packet. From these, the N2501 was found to be superior, leading to an initial production order for a batch of 34 aircraft on 10 July 1951.

Tragedy struck the development effort during 1952 when the first Nord 2501 prototype was lost in an accident during a test flight. On 9 January 1953, the Nord 2501 was baptised as the Noratlas by the widow of the pilot killed in the first prototype's crash. Despite the setback of the first prototype's loss, Nord continued the programme to schedule, fulfilling its initial contract for 34 aircraft by 25 June 1953, and the Armée de l'Air went on to order another 174 Noratlases, for a total of 228 aircraft in French service.

Several different models were developed and were proposed, but ultimately were never built. Of those built, perhaps the most distinct was the civil-orientated 2502, which featured additional engines in the form of a pair of wing-tip mounted Turbomeca Marboré turbojets, giving it improved takeoff performance. The proposed 2506 was to have further built upon the 2502, having been intended to possess airbrakes, along with re-designed flaps and height-adjustable landing gear. Following an eventual production run of some 425 planes, the final Noratlas was constructed during 1961. It was succeeded and eventually replaced by the multinational Transall C-160.

== Design ==
The Nord Noratlas was a purpose-built twin-engine, twin-boom transport aircraft. It featured a large pod-like fuselage that was slung in between the aircraft's twin booms and indirectly attached to them via its shoulder-mounted wing. The Noratlas was deliberately designed to be operated under austere conditions, featuring widely spaced landing gear, complete with wide low-pressure tyres, for additional stability and suitability to moving over rough terrain, while the propellers had sufficient clearance to accommodate such operations as well. It was powered by a pair of SNECMA-built Bristol Hercules 738/9 engines, each capable of producing 2,040 hp (1,520 kW) and driving a four-bladed Rotol propeller.

The sizable cabin of the Noratlas was capable of accommodating up to 7.5 short tons (6.8 t) of freight or a maximum of 40 passengers; when flown at a cruising speed of 200 mph (320 km/h), it could transport a 6-ton payload over a range of up to 750 miles (1,210 km). Cargo was typically loaded into and unloaded from the main cabin via the rear-facing clamshell doors, which were intentionally positioned close to ground level to ease freight handling.

== Operational history ==
=== French Air Force ===
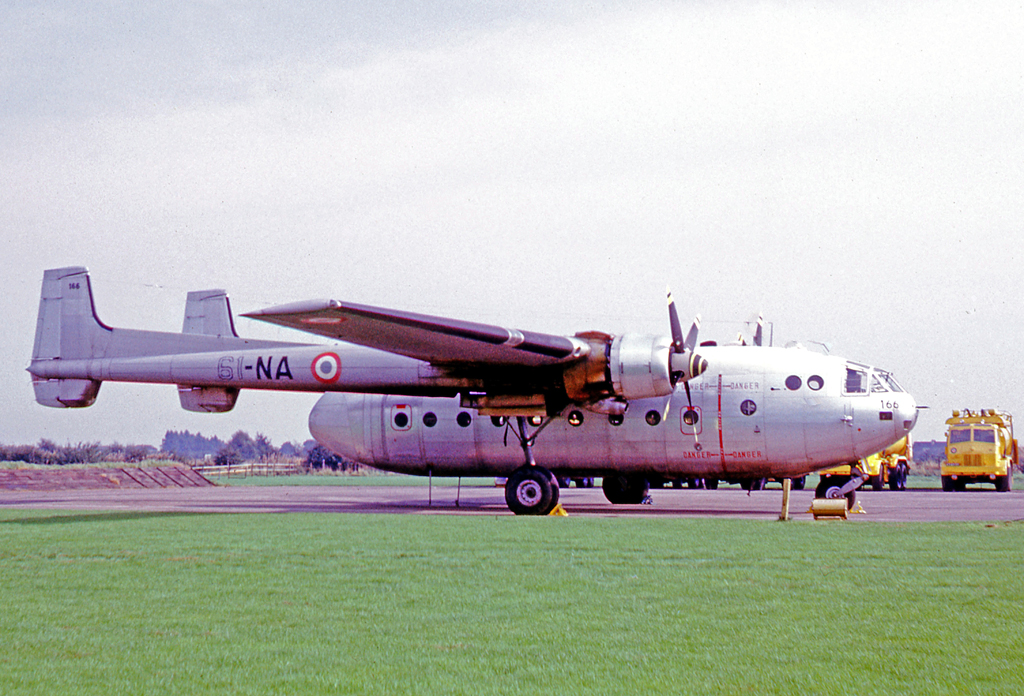
Operational Nord 2501 of 1/61 squadron of the 61 Escadre de Transport of the French Air Force in 1969

During its service life with the Armée de l'Air, the Noratlas was initially predominantly operated in it cargo-carrying role; however, 10 had been fitted out, as ordered, to facilitate performing passenger operations as well. However, following the conclusion of Algerian War of Independence in 1962 and the conclusion of French military operations in that theatre, many aircraft underwent conversion work to perform additional secondary roles. Of the various post-delivery customisations and modifications made to the Noratlas fleet, the eight Nord Gabriels, which were used in the electronic warfare role, was perhaps the most useful as well as being the longest serving aircraft. During 1989, the final Gabriel was finally phased out of operations with the Armée de l'Air, marking the complete retirement of the wider type as well.

The Noratlas had been able to attain particular recognition and notoriety amongst the general public as a consequence of its use during the Suez Crisis of 1956. During the opening phase of the Anglo-French operation, French paratroopers had been successfully air-dropped using the type to quickly deploy at various strategic locations, such as immediately south of Port Said and Port Fouad in Egypt.

=== German Air Force ===
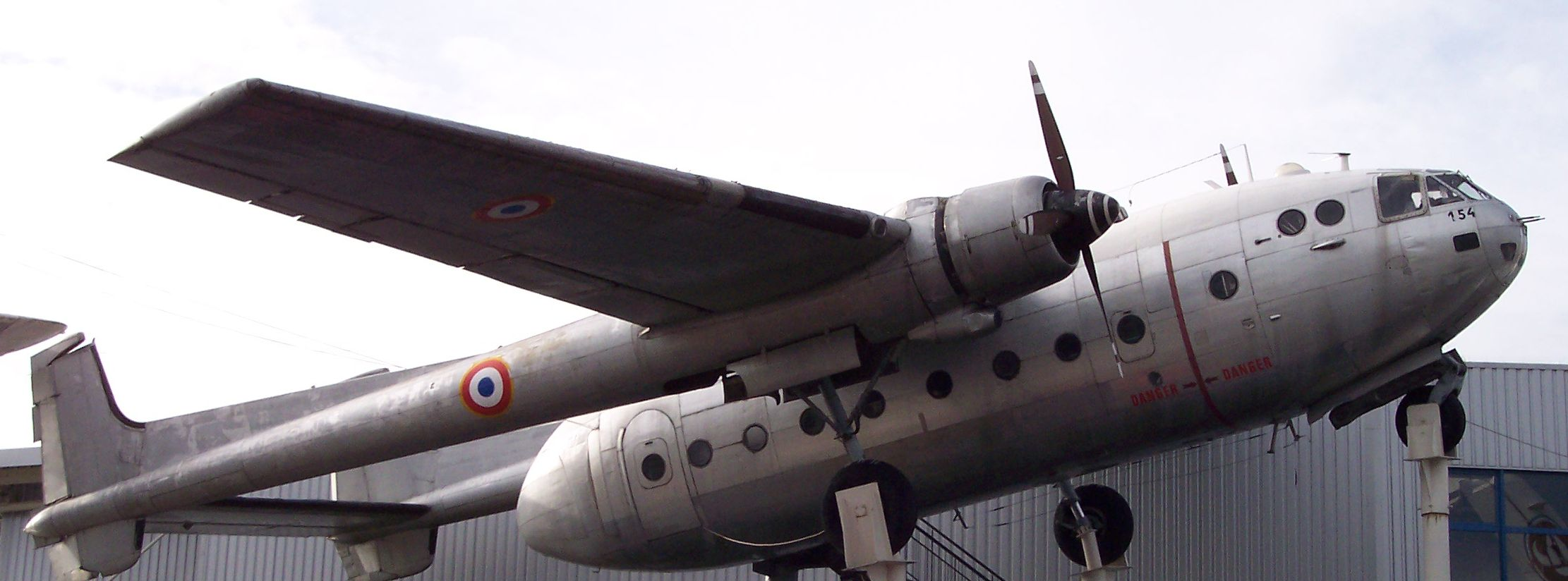
Nord Aviation N 2501D Noratlas at the Technik Museum, Speyer, Germany

During the post-war years, the newly formed nation of West Germany was faced with a similar situation to that which had prompted France to pursue development of the Noratlas. As such, the government decided to address the German Air Force's requirement for new transport aircraft in the same manner, eventually ordered a total of 187 Noratlases from 1956. Of these, the first 25 aircraft were manufactured in France, while the other 161 Noratlases were manufactured by the West German-based Flugzeugbau Nord company under contract; such aircraft were designated as N-2501D. Of these aircraft, only 173 were delivered. Flugzeugbau Nord had been involved in the Noratlas programme from an early stage, which was the company's first post-war aviation project, having been responsible for the design and manufacture of the majority of the aircraft's fuselage.

According to author John P. Cann, if the Noratlas in German service had a weakness, it was that the fleet was furnished with four different sets of cockpit instrumentation and electronic systems as a result of its complex procurement arrangement. The favourable experience with the Noratlas gave enthusiasm for further Franco-German collaborative efforts, leading directly to the larger and more advanced Transall C-160 transport aircraft. As a result of the superior Transall becoming available, the German Air Force came to consider its Noratlas fleet to have been supplanted and rendered surplus to requirements. Accordingly, as early as 1964, the German Air Force began to offer individual Noratlases for resale; in this fashion, Germany became the primary source for the various smaller national operators that came to operate the type. Portugal was a major customer for the ex-German aircraft, purchasing many for their own military requirements.

=== Israeli Air Force ===
During 1956, the Israeli Air Force (IAF) initially purchased three examples of the N-2501IS. However, this procurement had been made under duress—the French government would only allow Israel to purchase 12 of its Dassault Ouragan jet-powered fighters if the nation also acquired at least three Noratlases in the same deal. The Israelis were upset by the terms of the offer, however, at the time, France was one of only a few countries that were willing to sell modern armaments and combat platforms to Israel; eventually, the Israeli government agreed to France's terms. However, once in service, IAF personnel quickly came to realise the utility of the Noratlas following its performance during the Suez Crisis of 1956.

During 1959, having been suitably impressed by its use under combat conditions, the IAF purchased another three N-2501ISs; prior to the Six-Day War of 1967, an additional 16 ex-German Air Force N-2501Ds had also been acquired and put into service. The Noratlas fleet was primarily intended for cargo and paratroop transport, although several aircraft conducted more unconventional operations, being used as improvised bomber aircraft to perform long-range strike missions into Egypt (known as Operation Drought), much as the contemporary C-130s deployed the Daisy Cutter bomb in Vietnam. Amongst the other secondary roles that the IAF are known to have used their Noratlases for included maritime reconnaissance at the outset of the Six-Day War. IAF Noratlas aircraft intermittently tracked USS Liberty prior to the Liberty Incident. During 1978, the IAF retired the last of their Noratlas fleet.

=== Hellenic Air Force ===
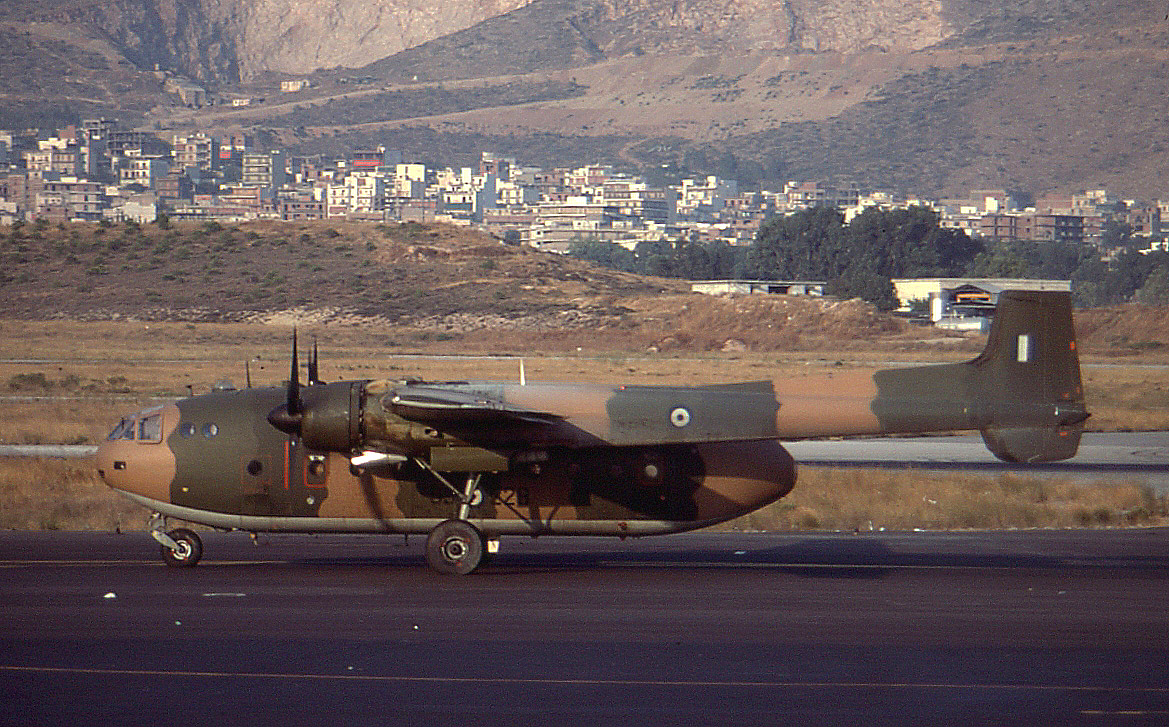
Noratlas of the Hellenic Air Force with serial 53-228 in 1979.

During 1970, the Hellenic Air Force (HAF) received 50 surplus Noratlases from Germany as part of a compensation package for events during the Second World War, as well as being an element of NATO-organised military assistance to Greece. The HAF Noratlases were operated by the 354th Tactical Airlift Squadron, based at Elefsis AFB on the outskirts of Athens. On the night of 21–22 July 1974, multiple HAF Noratlases played a role during the Operation Niki (meaning Victory in Greek), being used to airlift the 1st Greek Rangers Squadron from Souda, Crete to Nicosia, Cyprus, as part of Greece's response to the Turkish invasion of Cyprus. In spite of the aircraft's age and the adverse flying conditions present throughout, 12 of the 15 aircraft which participated in Operation Niki had managed to arrive and land at Nicosia International Airport; at least one Noratlas is believed to have been shot down by friendly fire from Greek-aligned forces. Regardless, the operation had allowed the Greek 1st Rangers Squadron to help retain the Nicosia airport under the control of the United Nations and avoid its surrender to the Turkish Brigade that had attacked it.

=== Portuguese Air Force ===
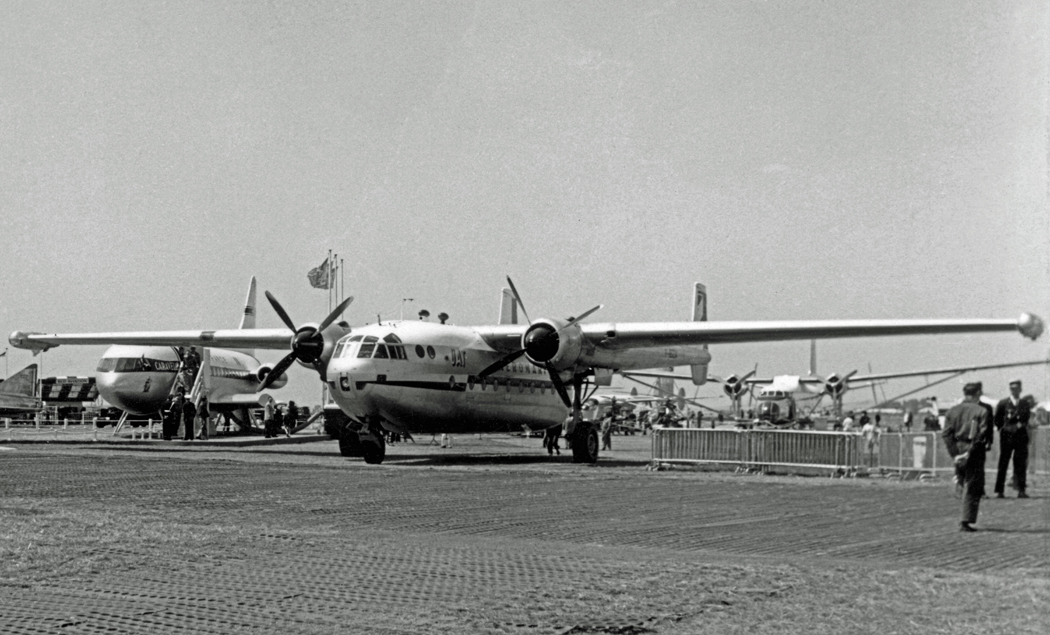
Civilian N-2502 of Aeromaritime with wingtip Turbomeca Marbore auxiliary jets in 1957

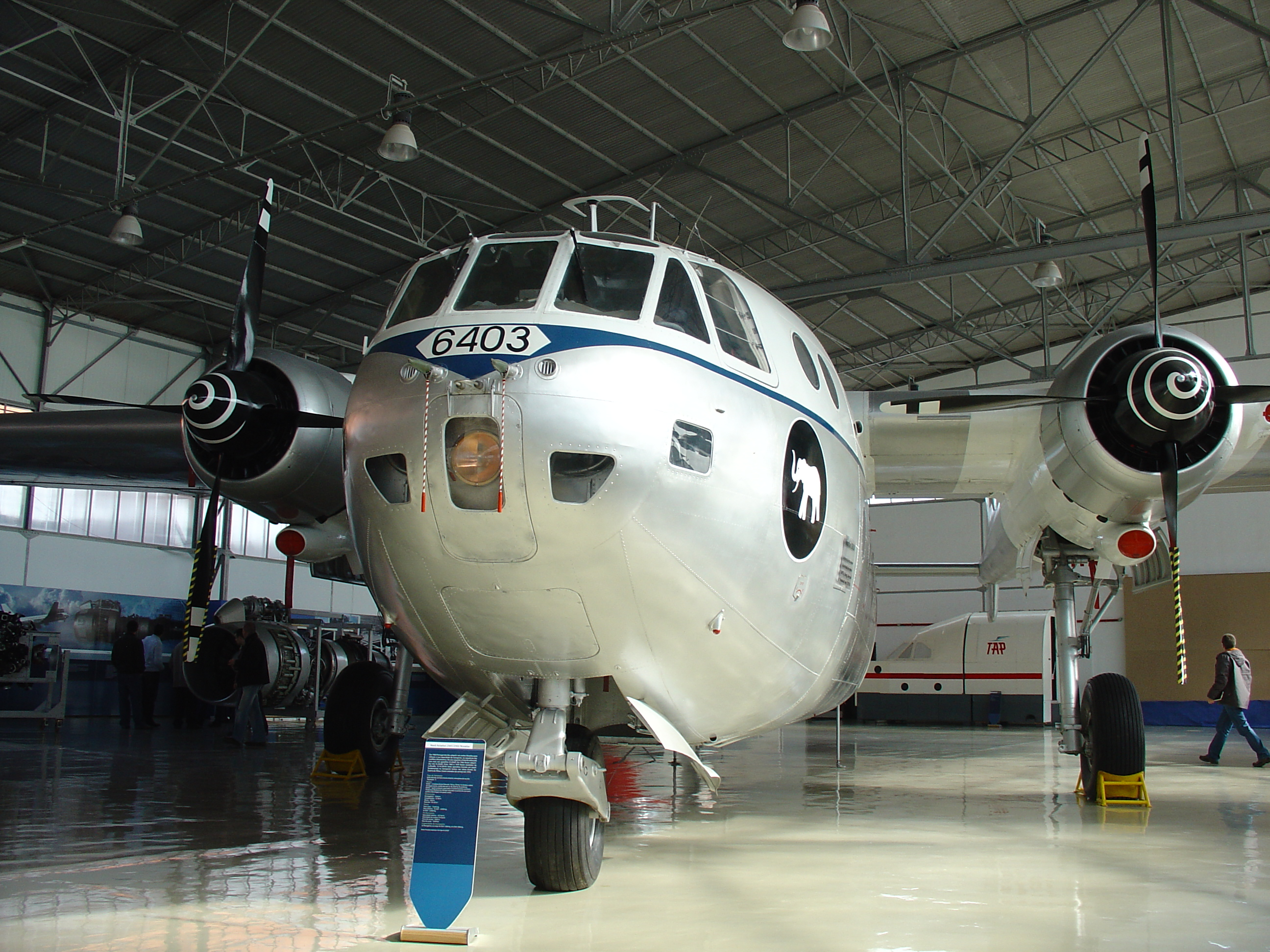
Former Portuguese Air Force N-2502F

The Portuguese Air Force operated a large number of Noratlases. During 1960, Portugal decided to purchase an initial batch of six militarised N-2502A (designated N-2502F) from French airline Union Aéromaritime de Transport (UAT). This purchase was quickly followed by six more of the same model, this time directly from Nord Aviation itself. Later on, an additional 19 N-2501Ds were purchased from the German Air Force. Overall, multiple units of the Portuguese Air Force operated the Noratlas, including Esquadra 32, based at Tancos Air Base, from 1970 to 1977, Esquadra 92, based at Luanda Air Base in Portuguese Angola, from 1961 to 1975, Esquadra 102, based at Beira Air Base in Mozambique, from 1962 to 1975, and Esquadra 123, based at Bissalanca Air Base in Portuguese Guinea, from 1969 to 1974.

Between 1961 and 1975, the Portuguese Air Force extensively operated their Noratlas fleet across all three of the African theatres of operations of the Portuguese Colonial War. In this lengthy conflict, the Noratlas was primarily used to conduct the intra-theatre tactical transportation missions, as well as to transport and deliver Portuguese paratroopers during airborne assault operations. Shortly following the independence of Angola and Mozambique in 1975, a batch of six ex-Portuguese Noratlas were given to the governments of these two new countries. By September 1977, all of the remaining Noratlases had been withdrawn from Portuguese service.

=== Civilian operations ===
By 1951, a civil-orientated version of the Noratlas, was under development and had received multiple orders from domestic and overseas customers. Known as the N-2502A/B, it was designed to be suitable for the transportation of both passenger and cargo payloads; the principal difference between the military models and the civil variant was the addition of a pair of small Turbomeca Marboré IIE turbojets, installed within the wingtips, for the purpose of improving the type's performance during the takeoff phase of flight only. The personnel doors normally used by paratroopers were also eliminated as it was seen as lacking value to the prospective civil customers it was aimed at.

The 2502 was used primarily by civil operators such as Aéromaritime de Transport (N-2502A) and CGTA-Air Algérie (N-2502B). However, the Noratlas never achieved the same level of success of the military versions in the civil market; only ten aircraft of this model were ever completed. However, this model would also often end up in military service via acquisitions from civil operators; as such, it saw relatively limited service with civilian customers.

== Variants ==
N2500
Prototype powered by a pair of Gnome et Rhône 14R 1600-hp engines, one built.
N2501
Production version for the French Air Force, powered by SNECMA-manufactured Hercules 739 radial piston engines with 2,068 PS each (1521 kW), five prototypes and 208 production aircraft built.
Nord 2501A
Civil transport version for UTA, fitted with two 1,650-hp (1230-kW) SNECMA 758/759 Hercules radial piston engines, four built later converted to N2502.
Nord 2501D
Production version for the German Air Force, replaced some systems components of the N2501 with their equivalent from German manufacturers, 186 built (25 French built and 161 German built).
Nord 2501E
The redesignation of one standard Nord 2501 for flight testing, the aircraft was used to test two Turbomeca Marbore II auxiliary turbojet engines.
Nord 2501IS
Replaced some systems components of the N-2501, 6 produced, purchased by the Israeli Air Force.
N-2501 Gabriel
SIGINT/electronic warfare platforms, 8 produced, probably modified N-2501s; operated by the Armée de l'Air's Escadron électronique aéroporté 1/54 Dunkerque.
Nord 2501TC
Nord 2501 modified for civil use by Transvalair, 3 produced.
Nord 2501
Civil transport version for Air Algérie and Union Aéromaritime de Transport, powered by two 1650-hp Bristol Hercules 758/759 radial engines, plus two Turbomeca Marbore II auxiliary turbojet engines.
Nord 2502A
Civil transport version for Union Aéromaritime de Transport, powered by two Turbomeca Marboré II auxiliary turbojets and two 1650-hp Bristol Hercules 758/759 radial engines. Five built and two conversions from N2501A.
Nord 2502B
Civilian cargo transport version for Air Algeria, powered by two Turbomeca Marboré II auxiliary turbojets and two 1650-hp Bristol Hercules 758/759 radial engines. 2 conversions from N2501A and one built.
Nord 2502C
Civilian cargo transport version, similar to Nord 2502A/B. Intended for purchase by an Indian airline, only one prototype was built.
Nord 2502F
Militarised version of the Nord 2502 for Portuguese Air Force, 6 conversions.
Nord 2503
Re-engined version with two 2,500 hp (1,900 kW) Pratt & Whitney R-2800-CB17 radial piston engines. One conversion from one of the Nord 2501 prototypes. Rebuilt as Nord 2508.
Nord 2504
Modification of the Nord 2502 intended for antisubmarine warfare training role with the French Navy, 24 ordered but only one built.
Nord 2505
Modified Nord 2502 intended for antisubmarine warfare, cancelled not built.
Nord 2506
Special modification of Nord 2502 to improve STOL performance and performance under heavy load for use as an assault transport, one conversion and one built from new.
Nord 2507
Modified Nord 2502 intended for search and rescue role, with 12-hour endurance or greater, never passed the planning stage.
Nord 2508
Modified Nord 2503, powered by two 1864-kW (2,500-hp) Pratt & Whitney R-2800-CB17 radial piston engines and two Turbomeca Marboré IIE auxiliary turbojets added; highly capable, but none were ordered; the prototypes were sold to Germany, one conversion and one built.
Nord 2508B
Cargo transport version of the N.2508.
Nord 2509
Unbuilt version. Not built.
Nord 2510
Unbuilt anti-submarine warfare version. Not built.
Nord 2520
Enlarged Nord 2502 with better cargo capacity, never passed the planning stage.

== Operators ==
=== Military operators ===
Angola

- FAPA/DAA

Republic of the Congo

- Force Aérienne Congolaise

Djibouti

- Djibouti Air Force

France

- French Air Force

Germany

- German Air Force

Greece

- Hellenic Air Force

Israel

- Israeli Air Force

Mozambique

- Mozambique Air Force

Niger

- Niger Air Force

Nigeria

- Nigerian Air Force

Portugal

- Portuguese Air Force

Rwanda

- Rwandan Air Force

Uganda

- Ugandan Air Force

=== Civilian operators ===
Algeria

- Air Algérie

Ecuador

- Aero Taxis Ecuatorianos - operated six ex-Luftwaffe Nord 2501Ds.

France

- Union Aéromaritime de Transport

=== Germany ===
- Elbeflug

== Surviving aircraft ==
=== Cyprus ===
- 52-128 (painted as 52-133) - 2501D on display at the Makedonitissa Tomb, the place where a similar aircraft crashed killing nearly all on board during the Turkish invasion of 1974.

=== France ===
- 105 - 2501F-3 preserved in flying condition by L'association Le Noratlas de Provence, based at Marseille Provence Airport. Carries civil registration F-AZVM.
- 184 - 2501F on display at L'Epopée de l'Industrie et de l'Aéronautique in Albert, Somme.
- 146 - 2501 on display at Ecole des metiers de l'automobile, at Viuz-en-sallaz Homepage
- 160 - 2501 on display and boardable at Morbihan Aero Musée, at Vannes-Meucon airport Homepage
- 191 - 2501 and 201 - 2501F with 201 being on display and 191 in storage at Ailes Anciennes Toulouse in Blagnac, Toulouse.

=== Germany ===
- 52+37 - 2501D in dilapidated state, formerly used as a pub (now defunct) at Schwelm.
- 99+14 - 2501D on display at the Militärhistorisches Museum Flugplatz Berlin-Gatow in Berlin.
- 154 - 2501F on display at Technik Museum Speyer in Speyer.
- D-ACUT - 2501D on display at Flugausstellung Hermeskeil in Hermeskeil.
- D-NORA - 2501F on display at Hamburg Finkenwerder Airport.

=== Israel ===
- 055 - 2501D preserved at the Israeli Air Force Museum in Hatzerim Airbase.
- 072 / 4X-FAW - 2501D preserved as a memorial at Defenders Park, Nahshon Junction near Beko'a.
- 4X-FAE - 2501D on display at the Israeli Air Force Museum in Hatzerim Airbase.

=== Portugal ===
- 6403 - 2502A on display at the Museu do Ar in Sintra.

== Specifications (Nord 2501) ==
Data from Jane's All the World's Aircraft 1958-59

General characteristics

- Crew: 4-5
- Capacity: 45 soldiers, 36 paratroopers, 18 patients with medics, or 8,458 kg (18,647 lb) cargo
- Length: 21.962 m (72 ft 1 in)
- Wingspan: 32.5 m (106 ft 8 in)
- Height: 6 m (19 ft 8 in)
- Wing area: 101.2 m^{2} (1,089 sq ft)
- Aspect ratio: 10.5
- Empty weight: 13,075 kg (28,825 lb)
- Max takeoff weight: 20,603 kg (45,422 lb)
- Fuel capacity: 5,090 L (1,344.6 US gal; 1,119.6 imp gal)
- Powerplant: 2 × SNECMA-manufactured Bristol Hercules 738 14-cylinder air-cooled sleeve-valve radial piston engines, 1,558 kW (2,089 hp) each without torquemeters

Hercules 739 with torquemeters
Hercules 758 / 759 with reversible-pitch propellers

- Propellers: 4-bladed constant-speed fully-feathering non-reversible propellers (Hercules 738 / 739)

Performance

- Maximum speed: 440 km/h (270 mph, 240 kn) at 21,000 kg (46,297 lb) AUW

405 km/h (252 mph; 219 kn) fully loaded

- Cruise speed: 324 km/h (201 mph, 175 kn) at 1,500 m (4,900 ft)

335 km/h (208 mph; 181 kn) at 3,000 m (9,800 ft)

- Range: 2,500 km (1,600 mi, 1,300 nmi)
- Service ceiling: 7,500 m (24,600 ft)
- Rate of climb: 6.25 m/s (1,230 ft/min) at sea level

4.75 m/s (935 ft/min) at 3,000 m (9,800 ft)
1 m/s (200 ft/min) at 1,500 m (4,900 ft)

- Wing loading: 207.5 kg/m^{2} (42.5 lb/sq ft)
- Take-off run: 660 m (2,170 ft)
- Take-off distance to 15 m (49 ft): 820 m (2,690 ft)
- Landing run: 420 m (1,380 ft) with reverse pitch
- Landing distance from 15 m (49 ft): 790 m (2,590 ft)

== See also ==
Aircraft of comparable role, configuration, and era

- Armstrong Whitworth AW.660 Argosy
- Blackburn Beverley
- Fairchild C-82 Packet
- Fairchild C-119 Flying Boxcar
