= 1986 Ilopango Douglas DC-6 crash =

Aircraft accident in El Salvador in 1986

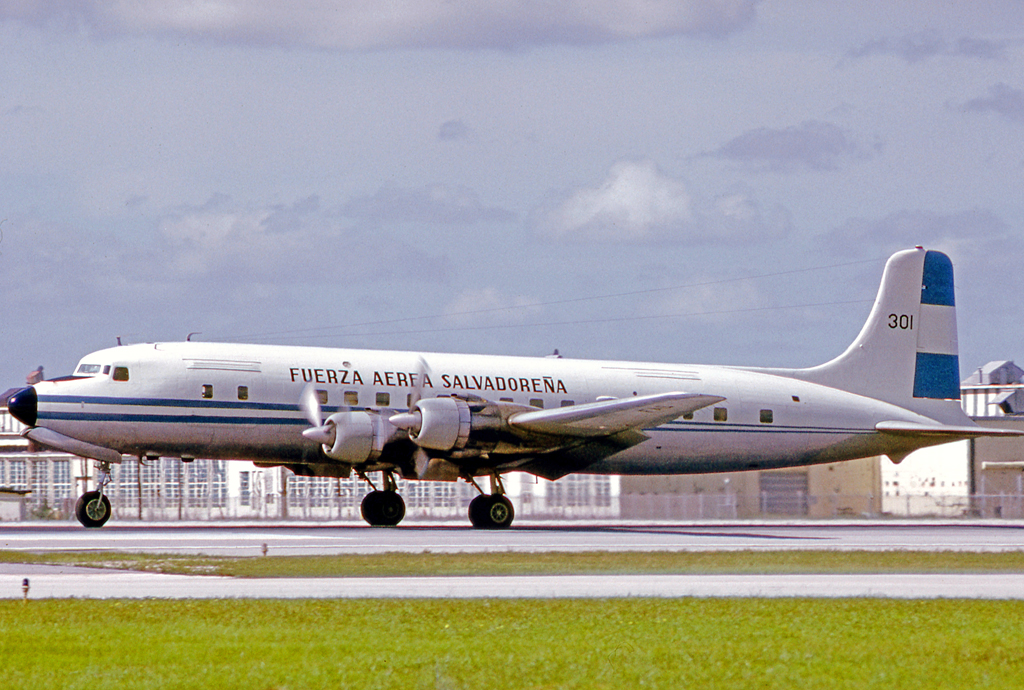
- A Douglas DC-6B of the Salvadoran Air Force, similar to the one involved in the accident

Accident
- Date: 1 May 1986
- Summary: Aircraft caught on fire and crashed shortly after takeoff
- Site: 1.5 miles (2.4 km) north of Ilopango International Airport, Ilopango, El Salvador

Aircraft
- Aircraft type: Douglas DC-6B
- Operator: Salvadoran Air Force
- Registration: FAS302
- Flight origin: Ilopango International Airport, Ilopango, El Salvador
- Destination: Tocumen International Airport, Panama City, Panama
- Occupants: 37
- Passengers: 33
- Crew: 4
- Fatalities: 37 (all)
- Survivors: 0

On 1 May 1986, a Douglas DC-6B of the Salvadoran Air Force crashed 1.5 miles (2.4 km) north of the Ilopango International Airport in Ilopango, El Salvador shortly after takeoff. The crash killed 37 people on board the aircraft making it the deadliest military aviation accident in Salvadoran history.

== Aircraft ==
The flight was operated by a Douglas DC-6B of the Salvadoran Air Force. The aircraft was manufactured in 1955 and had the tail number FAS302. The Salvadoran Air Force acquired the DC-6B from the United States Air Force.

== Accident ==
On 1 May 1986, the Douglas DC-6B carrying 37 members of the Salvadoran military took off from the Ilopango International Airport in Ilopango, El Salvador. There were 4 crew members and 33 passengers. The flight was carrying military personnel to a mechanics course in Panama. Two minutes after takeoff, the aircraft caught fire and crashed into a hill 1.5 miles (2.4 km) north of the airport at 4:32 a.m. local time. None of the 37 people on board the plane survived. No ground casualties were reported but one house was destroyed.

== Cause ==
The Salvadoran government initially suggested that a mechanical failure caused the crash but did not rule out sabotage by the rebel Farabundo Martí National Liberation Front (FMLN), although the government considered sabotage to be "unlikely". The FMLN did not claim responsibility for the crash over its Radio Venceremos broadcasts. The aircraft did not have either a cockpit voice recorder or flight data recorder on board. The cause of the crash was never determined.

The crash is the deadliest military aviation accident in Salvadoran history. It was the deadliest aviation accident in Salvadoran history until 9 August 1995 when Aviateca Flight 901 crashed and killed 65 people.

== See also ==
- List of accidents and incidents involving the Douglas DC-6
