= TAI Flight 307 =

1959 aviation accident

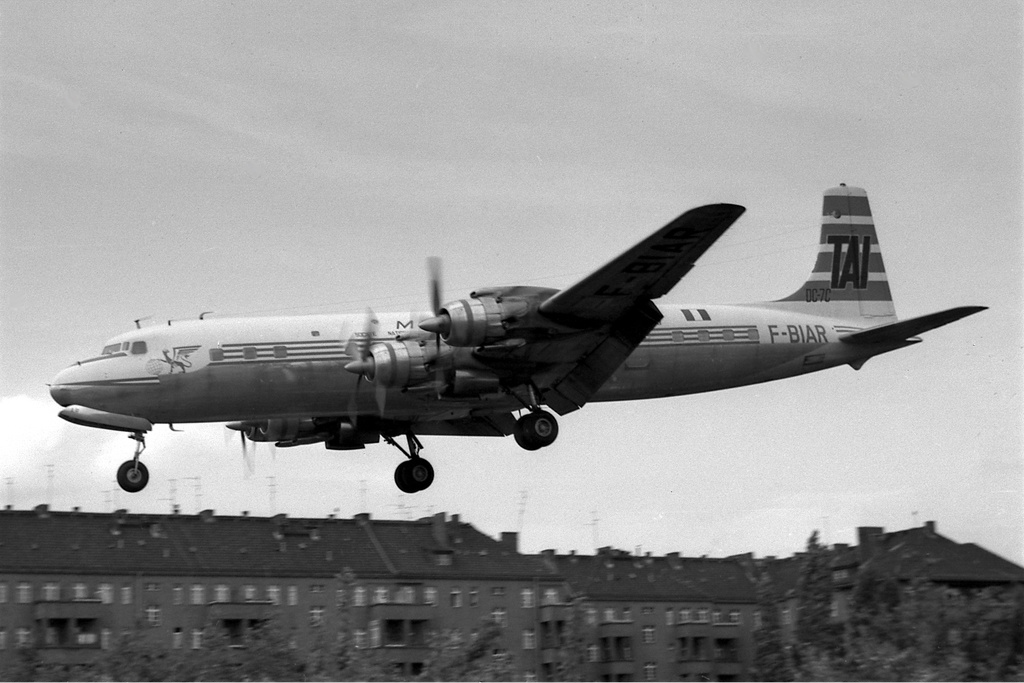
- A DC-7C of TAI similar to the crash aircraft

Accident
- Date: 24 September 1959
- Summary: Controlled flight into terrain
- Site: Bordeaux–Mérignac Airport, France; 44.8283°N 0.7156°W

Aircraft
- Aircraft type: Douglas DC-7C
- Operator: Transports Aériens Intercontinentaux (TAI)
- Registration: F-BIAP
- Flight origin: Bordeaux–Mérignac Airport, France
- Stopover: Bamako Airport, Mali
- Destination: Abidjan, Ivory Coast
- Occupants: 65
- Passengers: 56
- Crew: 9
- Fatalities: 54
- Injuries: 11
- Survivors: 11

TAI Flight 307 was a scheduled flight operated by Transports Aériens Intercontinentaux (TAI) between France and the Ivory Coast via Mali operated by a Douglas DC-7C. On 24 September 1959, the aircraft crashed during its departure from Bordeaux–Mérignac Airport, France when it flew into trees. All of the flight crew and 45 of the 56 passengers on board were killed; the other 11 passengers were seriously injured.

== Accident ==
The DC-7C arrived at Bordeaux from Paris, making a scheduled stop on its route to West Africa. Following a two-hour stopover, departure from Bordeaux took place at 22:33 GMT. Weather at the time of departure was a 3-knot (3.5 mph) wind and light drizzle that did not significantly restrict visibility. Following takeoff, the aircraft reached an altitude of 30 metres (98 ft), and failed to climb further before flying into a pine forest located 2,950 metres (9,680 ft) from the end of the runway.

The aircraft cut a swath through the forest; some of the passengers were thrown clear of the wreckage as the fuselage broke up, before being destroyed in a post-crash fire. Because of the darkness and a lack of roads in the accident area, rescue workers had difficulty reaching the scene of the crash; their vehicles were unable to approach closer than 0.5 miles (0.80 km) to the impact site. Twelve survivors were taken to a hospital in Bordeaux; one later died despite medical care, bringing the total number of deaths caused by the crash to 54.

== Aircraft ==
The aircraft involved in the accident, registered F-BIAP, was a Douglas DC-7C airliner powered by four Wright R-3350-30W radial piston engines. Delivered new to Transports Aériens Intercontinentaux on 9 November 1957, it carried manufacturer's serial number 45366.

== Probable cause ==
The Investigation Board appointed to determine the cause of the crash reported that the accident was most likely caused by a combination of factors. Evidence from a reconstructed flight showed that with an increase in speed for a few seconds, the rate of climb of the aircraft will decrease; with a lack of visual references "a pilot may follow a line of flight that will bring the aircraft back near the ground if, during this period, optimum climbing speed is not maintained and the altimeter is not carefully watched".
