= 1956 Cairo TAI Douglas DC-6 crash =

1956 aviation accident

1956 Cairo DC-6 crash
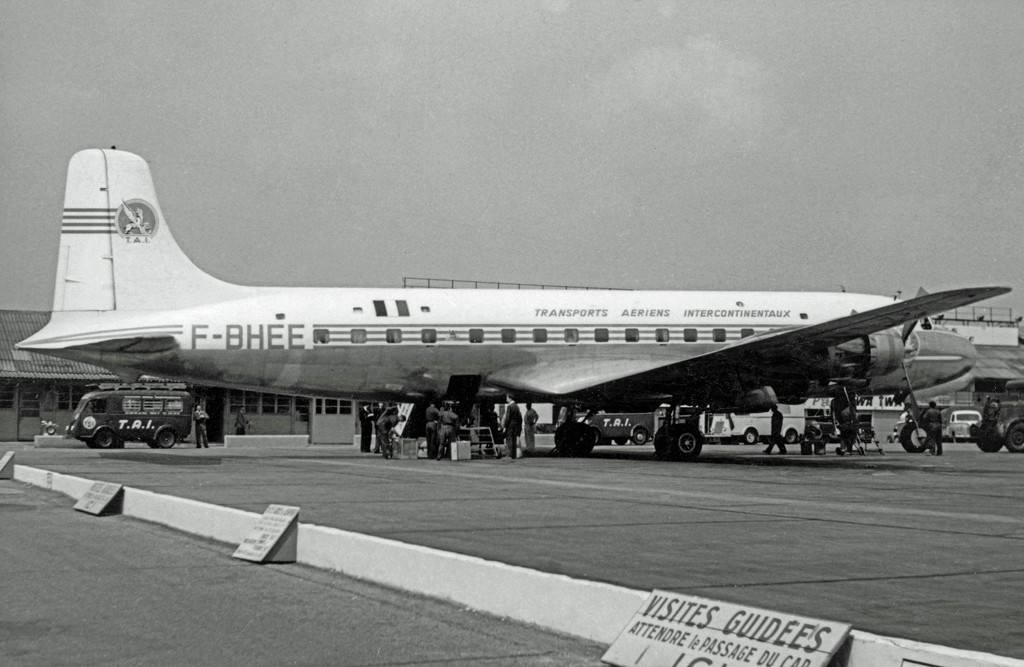
- A DC-6B of TAI similar to the incident aircraft.

Accident
- Date: 20 February 1956
- Site: 25 km North-East of Cairo International Airport, Egypt

Aircraft
- Aircraft type: Douglas DC-6B
- Operator: Transports Aériens Intercontinentaux
- Registration: F-BGOD
- Flight origin: Saigon, Vietnam
- Stopover: Calcutta, India
- 2nd stopover: Karachi, Pakistan
- 3rd stopover: Cairo, Egypt
- Destination: Paris, France
- Passengers: 55 or 52
- Crew: 9
- Fatalities: 52
- Survivors: 12 or 9

The Transports Aériens Intercontinentaux Douglas DC-6B scheduled flight from Saigon, Vietnam to Paris, France crashed on 20 February 1956 before its third stopover 25 km North-East of Cairo International Airport due to crew error and possible fatigue. 52 people on board were killed.

The crash was caused by a failing altimeter in combination with a pilot who was taking his flight exam while landing with self created limited visibility. The pilot was convicted of involuntary manslaughter. Due to the crash, conducting flying exams became forbidden on passenger flights.

The crash has been listed by Dutch newspaper Het Huisgezin as one of the main international disasters of 1956.

== Flight and crash ==
A Transports Aériens Intercontinentaux Douglas DC-6B with tail number “F-BGOD” departed from Saigon with a delay of around 20 hours. The flight had stopovers in Calcutta, Karachi and Cairo and had its final destination Paris. The airplane departed from Karachi to Cairo on 19 February 1956 at 17:15 UTC. The pilot had asked permission to land at Cairo International Airport just before 3am, and the plane was in sight of the airport tower.

A bit later, just before 3am at around 25 km North-East of the airport, the aircraft crashed in the desert on a hill, broke up and caught fire.

== Victims ==
A total of 55 passengers and 9 crew members were listed to be on board. After the crash it was reported that 3 people had missed the flight. That would make a total of 52 passengers. All passengers were French people from Indochina.

A total of 52 people died in the crash: 3 crew members and 49 passengers, including 11 children and 3 babies. Of the 27 males who died, 22 were military.

Six crew members and six passengers were able to exit the airplane via the emergency exit at the front side of the airplane. The six crew members who survived the crash consisted of: the experienced pilot in charge Charles Billot, who was injured, the inexperienced co-pilot who was still taking his flight exam Robert Rolland, two mechanics and two radio operators.

A man named Fortuna survived the crash together with his two young sons; but he lost his wife and one or two daughters.

== Rescue operation ==
A major in a jeep of the Egyptian army witnessed the crash.

The plane had landed in an inaccessible part of the desert two kilometers from the nearest road. It took four hours to reach the crash site by land. In addition to the fact that there were several ravines and that it was a hilly path to reach the crash site, the rescue vehicles were affected by a severe sandstorm.

Two Piper J-3 Cub airplanes of the national petroleum society were used to transport doctors, nurses and medication to the crash site and to transport injured people to Cairo.

== Cause of the crash ==
Soon after the accident Billot stated that the co-pilot, a trainee, would land the aircraft. At the moment that Billot saw that they were flying too low, he could not do anything anymore. Crew members stated shortly after the crash, that shortly before landing two engines failed and the pilot tried to make an emergency landing in the desert.

In 1964, Billot stated before the magistrate in Versailles that he was conducting a part of the flight exam with the co-pilot Robert Rolland during the landing phase. Billot was asked to do so. Part of the exam was to fly with limited visibility. Because the weather was good, they flew with the curtains closed at the sides. According to Billot, Rolland made a fateful mistake as a result of the failing altimeter.

Pilot Billot was blamed for failing to monitor the co-pilot Rolland during the approach procedure and was convicted of involuntary manslaughter. Co-pilot Rolland was blamed for relying exclusively on his instruments to fix his position at an altitude below the minimum safe altitude.

Immediately after this disaster, conducting flying exams became prohibited on flights with passengers.
