= Elbeflug =

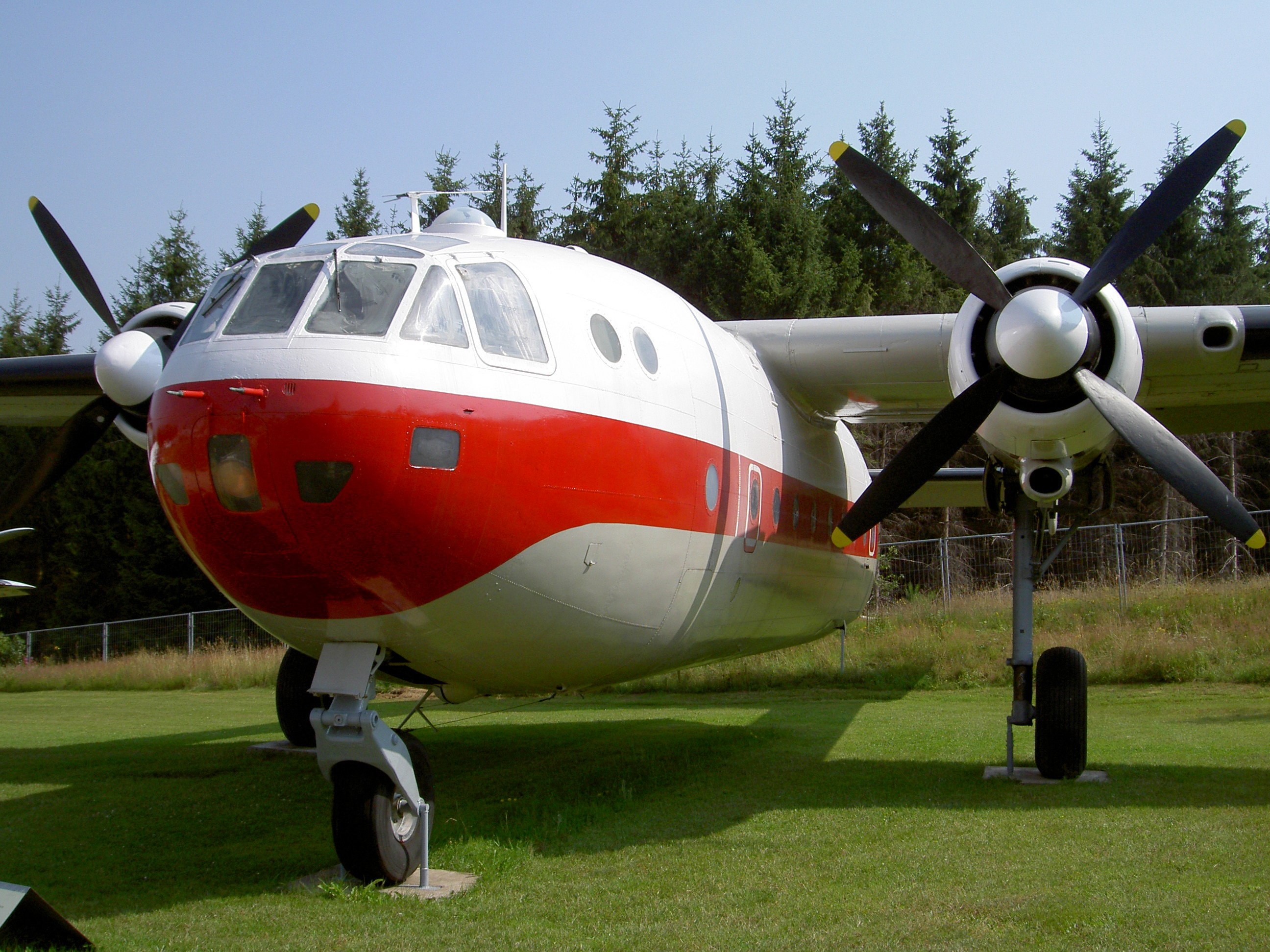
- Nord Noratlas
IATA	ICAO	Call sign
–	–	-
- Founded: 1969
- Commenced operations: never flew
- Ceased operations: 1972
- Operating bases: Lübeck-Blankensee Airport
- Fleet size: 17
- Headquarters: Pinneberg
- Key people: Horst Ortwin Möller
- Employees: 40

Elbeflug was a German based cargo airline that never flew a commercial flight.

== History ==
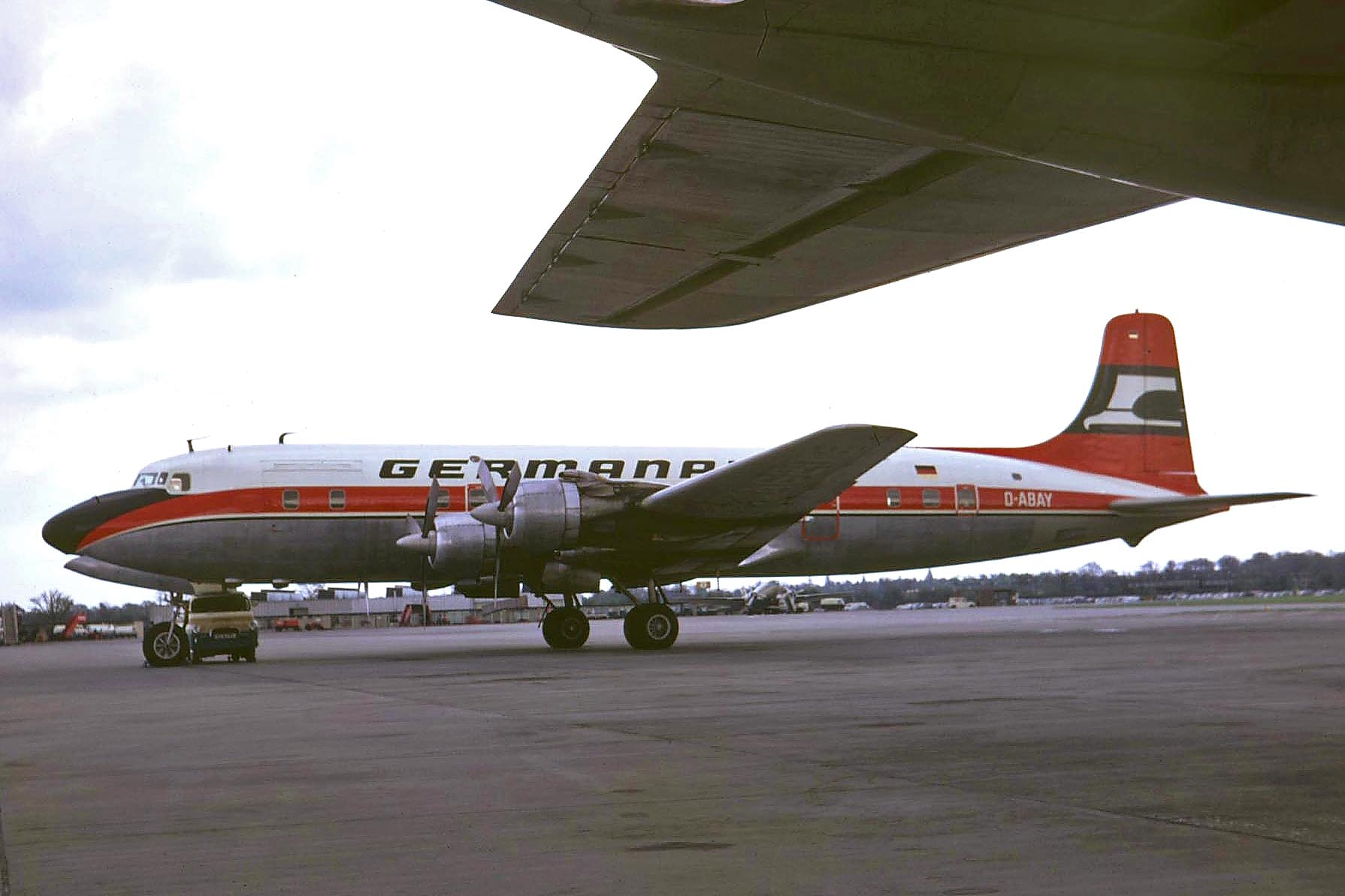
Germania DC 6 formerly owned by Elbeflug

In 1969, Horst Ortwin Möller, a businessman from Pinneberg, founded Elbeflug and acquired 23 Nordlas Aircraft from Vebeg. The airline intended to serve North Africa and the Middle East with bulky goods. The Luftwaffe was the original owner of the Nordlas Aircraft despite their sometimes low number of flight hours with 16 delivered but D-ACUR was stranded after an emergency landing. Möller used part of the capital of DM 10.5 million contributed by the 329 limited partners consisting of entrepreneurs, lawyers, doctors and freelancers. Two TF Transport DC 6 aircraft were added to the fleet to commence flight operations. The plan for a lucrative cargo airline never materialized, as the Federal Aviation Office refused to grant the company an operating license due to its opaque corporate structure. As such not a single flight was operated for operational purposes. D-ABAY was the only aircraft was shown at an airshow briefly where Elbeflug had options for two Transall C-160 aircraft. In 1972 the airline was shut down. In 1977, Horst Ortwin Möller and Helga Möller were sentenced to long term prison after a trial for investment fraud.

== Fleet ==
Elbeflug owned 17 aircraft:

- 2 Douglas DC-6
- 15 Nord Noratlas

=== Other aircraft included ===
- Options for 2 Transall C-160 aircraft

== See also ==
List of defunct airlines of Germany
