= 1964 Alcazaba UTA Douglas DC-6 crash =

1964 aviation accident

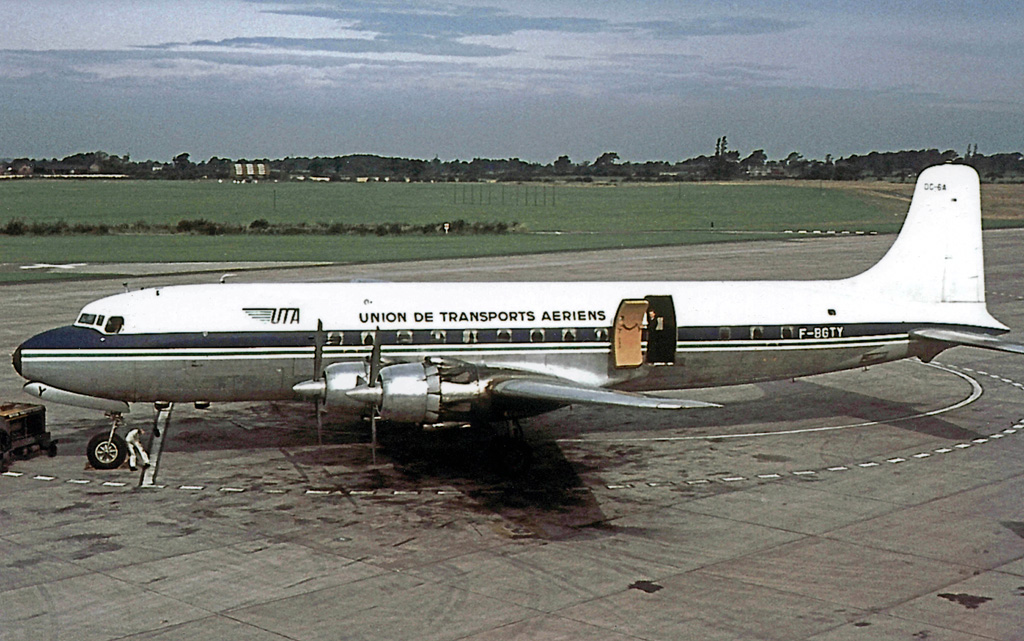
- A UTA DC-6, similar to the aircraft involved in the accident

Accident
- Date: 2 October 1964
- Summary: Cause unknown; possible controlled flight into terrain
- Site: Alcazaba, near Granada, Andalusia, Spain

Aircraft
- Aircraft type: Douglas DC-6B
- Operator: Union de Transports Aériens
- Registration: F-BHMS
- Flight origin: Undefined airport in Paris, France
- Stopover: Undefined airport in Marseille, France
- 1st stopover: Palma de Mallorca Airport (PMI/LEPA), Spain
- Destination: Port-Étienne Airport (NDB/GQPP), Mauritania
- Occupants: 80
- Passengers: 73
- Crew: 7
- Fatalities: 80
- Survivors: 0

The Alcazaba UTA Douglas DC-6 crash was an accident involving a Douglas DC-6B of the French airline Union de Transports Aériens into Alcazaba near Granada, Andalusia, Spain, on 2 October 1964, killing all 80 people on board.

== Accident ==
The UTA flight took off from Palma de Mallorca Airport, Spain on runway 27 at 3.14 am on 2 October 1964 bound for Port-Étienne Airport (Modern day Nouadhibou), Mauritania after having initially started its journey from Paris, France with a stopover in Marseille, France and Palma de Mallorca, Spain. The flight was operating in a scheduled international flight set by the airline, and was expected to head for Tangier, Morocco after checking in with other area control centers such as Barcelona and Seville. While on the planned route, the flight contacted Seville at 4:20 am giving an estimate as to when the plane would arrive at its destination and commenting on the weather conditions. It would be the last communication from the flight before it crashed into Alcazaba near Granada, Andalusia, Spain, at 4:45 am some 25 km (15.5 miles) from its intended check-in control center Tangier. Further attempts by Seville to contact the flight failed and confirmed to them that the plane had crashed. When the crash site was reached, it became apparent that there were no survivors among the flight's 80 occupants.

== Aircraft ==
The Douglas DC-6B involved, F-BHMS (msn 44062/384) was built in 1953 and was used by Union de Transports Aériens from 1953 until its destruction in 1964.

== Aftermath ==
The aircraft was destroyed in the crash. An investigation of the accident revealed that the aircraft had somehow deviated 5° from its intended course to Tangier. However, the cause of this deviation remains unknown.
