= Union Aéromaritime de Transport =

Airline of France (1949–1963)

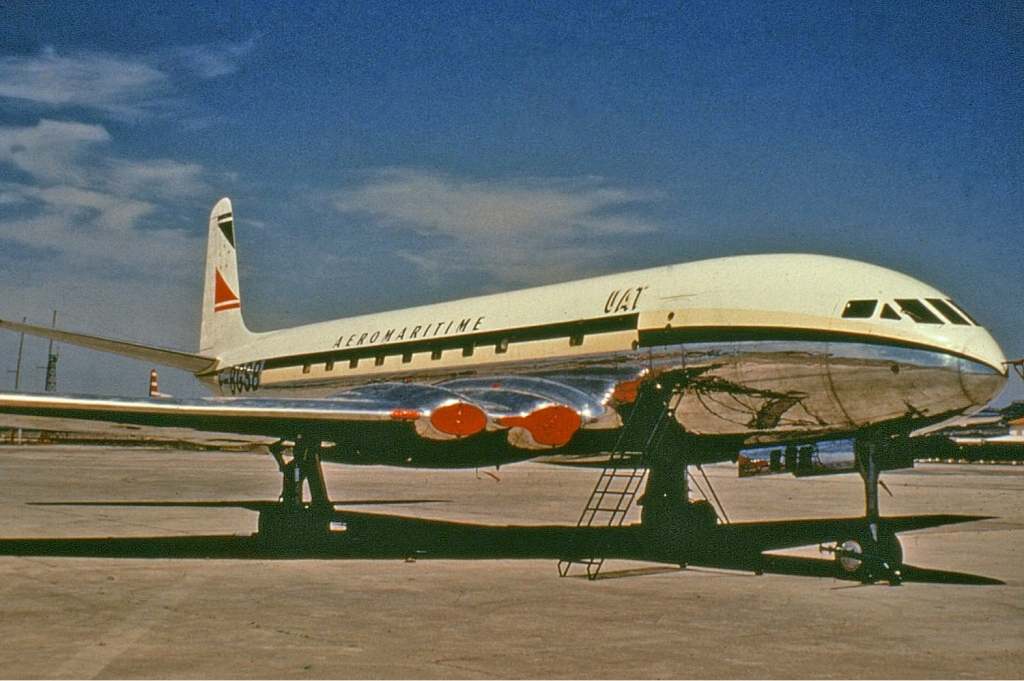
- UAT operated three De Havilland Comet 1A in 1954.
- Founded: 1949
- Ceased operations: 1 October 1963 (merged with TAI to form UTA)
- Hubs: Paris–Le Bourget Airport
- Headquarters: 8th arrondissement, Paris, France

Union Aéromaritime de Transport (UAT) was a French airline. It had its head office in the 8th arrondissement of Paris.

== History ==
The airline was founded in 1949 by a group of technicians and the shipping line Chargeurs Réunis. This was the same company which had founded the original Aéromaritime in 1934 to supplement its shipping operations around West Africa. The new postwar Aéromaritime continued under the wing of UAT until the rise of African nationalism required the creation of a more user-friendly Air Afrique, and other local companies.

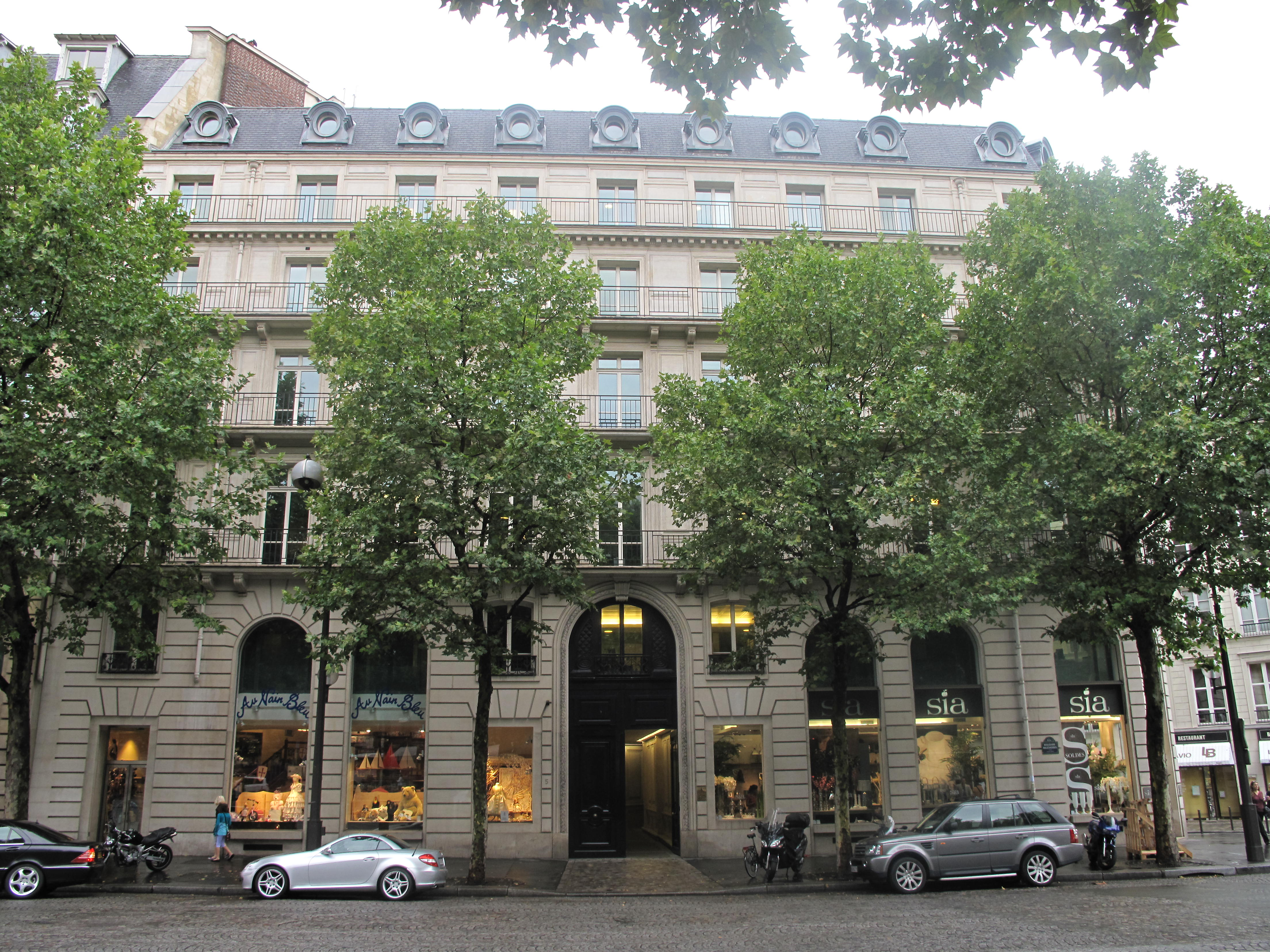
Former head office of UAT

On 1 May 1955, the company took over the Far East subsidiary of Aigle Azur, Aigle Azur Extrême-Orient, and continued running routes in that livery until 1961. The fleet included three Boeing 307 Stratoliners.

== Operations ==
Early in 1950 Douglas DC-4 Skymaster scheduled services were started to Dakar, Pointe Noire and Saigon. In 1951 the Dakar service was extended to Abidjan. UAT ordered the De Havilland Comet 1A and placed it in service on 19 February 1953 on certain routes to West Africa and by November 1953 the Comets were serving Johannesburg. In September 1954 the first of a fleet of Nord Noratlas aircraft was put into service and in 1955 the Douglas DC-6 replaced the Comets after their problems with BOAC.

UAT ran services under contract to the International Control Commission, linking Saigon, Phnom Penh, Vientiane and Hanoi, with: F-BELU, F-BELX & F-BHHR.

The February 1959 OAG shows 14 DC-6Bs a week out of Le Bourget bound for Tripoli, Johannesburg and other African cities.

Millions of revenue passenger-kilometers, scheduled flights only: 304 in 1957, 468 in 1960.

In 1963 Aeromaritime merged with Transports Aériens Intercontinentaux to form Union de Transports Aériens (UTA). However, the Aeromaritime name continued to be used on some aircraft until the late 1960s.

== Historic fleet details ==
The following aircraft types were operated by UAT:

- De Havilland Comet 1A
- De Havilland Heron
- Douglas DC-3
- Douglas DC-4
- Douglas DC-6
- Douglas DC-8
- Nord Noratlas

== Incidents ==
On 26 December 1958 a Douglas DC-6B of UAT (F-BGTZ) crashed in Salisbury, Rhodesia (now Zimbabwe). Three passengers out of a total of 70 passengers and crew died in the crash. The aircraft took off in a tropical storm and hit a downdraft. The crash site was within the airport perimeter.

On 29 March 1959, a Nord Noratlas of UAT (F-BGZB) exploded in midair on a flight between Berbérati and Bangui, killing all nine onboard, including Barthélemy Boganda, the prime minister of the Central African Republic autonomous territory (the future Central African Republic.

== Bibliography ==
- R.E.G. Davies, A History of the World's Airlines, 1964, Oxford University Press, ISBN none
