= Transports Aériens Intercontinentaux =

Airline of France

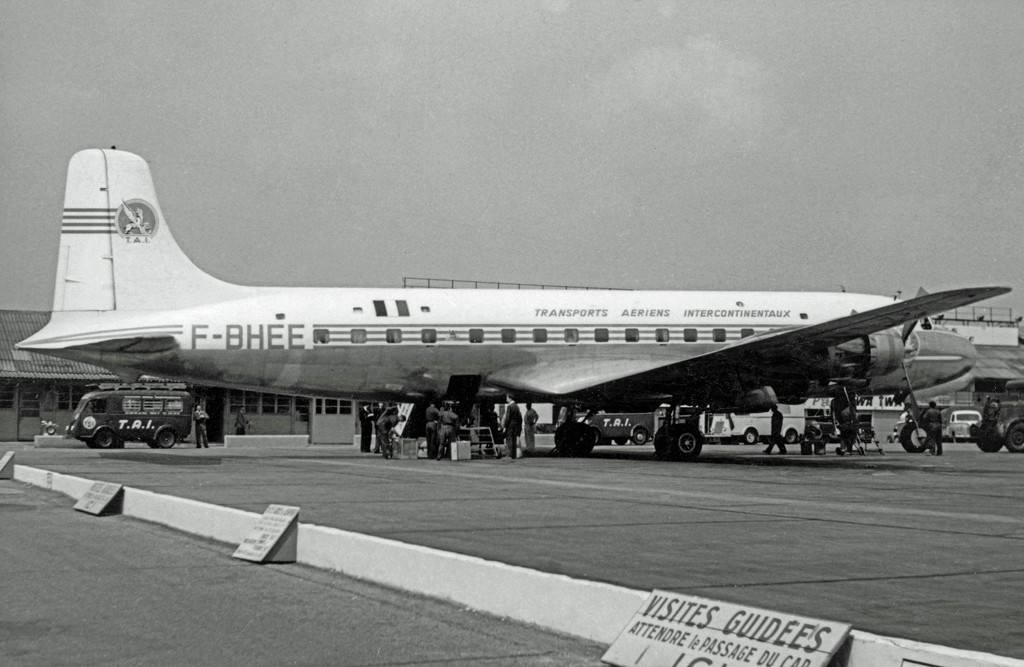
- TAI Douglas DC-6B at Paris Orly Airport in 1957
IATA	ICAO	Call sign
-	-	-
- Founded: 11 May 1946
- Ceased operations: 1 October 1963 (merged with UAT to form UTA)
- Hubs: Orly Airport

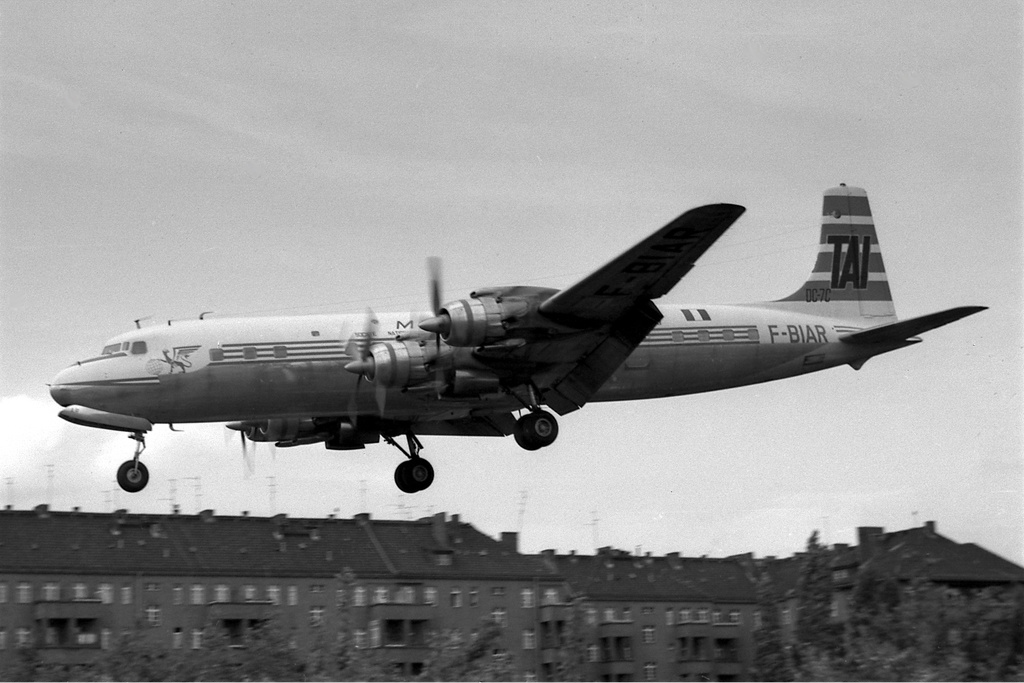
Douglas DC-7C

Transports Aériens Intercontinentaux (TAI, lit. "Intercontinental Air Transport") was a private French airline, based at Orly Airport, Paris. In 1963, it was merged with Union Aéromaritime de Transport on 1 October 1963 to form UTA French Airlines.

== Operations ==
In the early 1950s its routes were Paris - Tunis - Damascus - Karachi - Bangkok - Saigon - Hanoi, Paris - Algiers - Fort Lamy - Douala - Brazzaville - Tananarive (Antananarivo), Paris - Casablanca - Bamako - Abidjan, and Paris - Casablanca - Bamako - Dakar.

By 1957 the route continued beyond Saigon to Darwin, Brisbane, Noumea, and Auckland. As the airport for Tahiti began construction, T.A.I. began to fly to Bora Bora on the Society Islands in French Polynesia in 1958. Until the Papeete Airport in Tahiti airport opened in 1960, the island was served by TAI Short Solent flying boats.

In the late 1950s the airline flew the Sud-Est Armagnac, a French manufactured airliner, as well as Douglas DC-4s and Douglas DC-6s with these aircraft having a light green livery with white cabin top and fin. They bought their first Douglas DC-8 jet airliners during 1960. The company extended its service to Jakarta in Indonesia. The livery changed to an attractive yellow, green, and black striped tail with "T.A.I." on it, and a green stripe down the fuselage. The February 1959 Official Airline Guide (OAG) lists eleven departures a week from Paris Orly Airport: seven DC-6Bs to mainland Africa, two to Tananarive, one to Auckland and one DC-7C to Djakarta. In 1960, the airline was serving the Bora Bora Airport in French Polynesia with Douglas DC-7C flights nonstop to Honolulu with continuing, no change of plane service to Los Angeles and was also operating direct DC-7C service between Bora Bora and Noumea via a stop in Nandi.

Millions of revenue passenger-kilometers, scheduled flights only: 300 in 1957 and 369 in 1960.

According to its 1 April 1963 system timetable, the airline was operating Douglas DC-8 jet service on a number of international routes including Paris Orly Airport - Athens - Teheran - Karachi - Rangoon - Phnom Penh - Jakarta; Paris Orly Airport - Athens - Beirut - Karachi - Bangkok - Saigon - Darwin - Sydney - Noumea; Paris Orly Airport - Marseille - Athens - Djibouti - Tananarive; Paris Orly Airport - Marseille - Bamako - Ouagadougou - Abidjan and Paris Orly Airport - Marseille - Niamey - Abidjan as well as Noumea - Nandi - Papeete, Tahiti - Los Angeles and Papeete, Tahiti - Honolulu. This same timetable also lists Douglas DC-6B propliner service between Paris Orly Airport, Marseille, Bamako, Ouagadougou and Abidjan as well as regional service in the Pacific flown with Douglas DC-4 propliners linking Noumea with Auckland, Port Vila, Espiritu Santo, Wallis Island and Papeete, Tahiti.

== Accidents and incidents ==
- On 26 October 1946, Amiot AAC.1 F-BBYL was written off at Marignane Airport.
- On 6 January 1947, Amiot AAC.1 F-BBYK struck Mont Ventoux in Provence in poor weather while operating a cargo flight; all three crew on board survived, but the aircraft was written off.
- On 8 December 1950, Douglas C-54A F-BELB crashed into high ground on climbout from Bangui Airport due to crew error, killing 46 of 56 on board; the accident remains the worst in the Central African Republic.
- On 18 July 1951, Douglas C-54A F-BDRI crashed on climbout from Arivonimamo Airport; there were no fatalities, but the aircraft was written off.
- On 20 February 1956, Douglas DC-6B F-BGOD crashed 18 mi southeast of Cairo International Airport due to crew errors (although crew fatigue was also possible), killing 52 of 64 on board.
- On 24 September 1959, TAI Flight 307 (a Douglas DC-7C, F-BIAP) crashed on climbout from Merignac Airport due to pilot error, killing 54 of 65 on board (one person initially survived, but later died in the hospital).

== Bibliography ==
- R.E.G. Davies, A History of the World's Airlines, 1964, Oxford University Press, ISBN none.
