= Union de Transports Aériens =

Private airline of France (1963–1992)

Union de Transports Aériens S.A.
| IATA | ICAO | Call sign |
|---|---|---|
| UT | UTA | UTA |
- Founded: 1 October 1963 (amalgamation)
- Ceased operations: 18 December 1992 (merged into Air France)
- Hubs: Paris–Charles de Gaulle (1974–1992); Paris–Le Bourget (1963–1974)
- Frequent-flyer program: Fréquence Plus
- Parent company: Chargeurs (1963–1990); Air France (1990–1992)
- Headquarters: 8th arrondissement, Paris, France
- Key people: Antoine Veil; Georges Fayet; Francis Fabre; René Lapautre; Edmond Braure; Pierre Chagniot; Luc Ragoucy; Dominique Gretz; Jean Claude Revil; Marie-Line Cabrera

Union de Transports Aériens (French pronunciation: [ynjõ də tɾɑ̃spɔʁz‿aeʁjɛ̃]; abbreviated as UTA and sometimes known as UTA French Airlines) was a private independent airline in France that operated from 1963 until it merged with Air France in 1992. UTA was formed by the merger of Union Aéromaritime de Transport (UAT) and Transports Aériens Intercontinentaux (TAI). UTA was the largest wholly privately owned, independent (Note: independent from government-owned corporations) airline in France. It was also the second-largest international, as well as the second principal intercontinental, French airline (Note: after Air France) and a full member of the International Air Transport Association (IATA) since its inception.

The airline was a subsidiary of Compagnie Maritime des Chargeurs Réunis, the French shipping line founded and controlled by the Fabre family, but was absorbed into Air France between 1990 and 1992.

== History ==
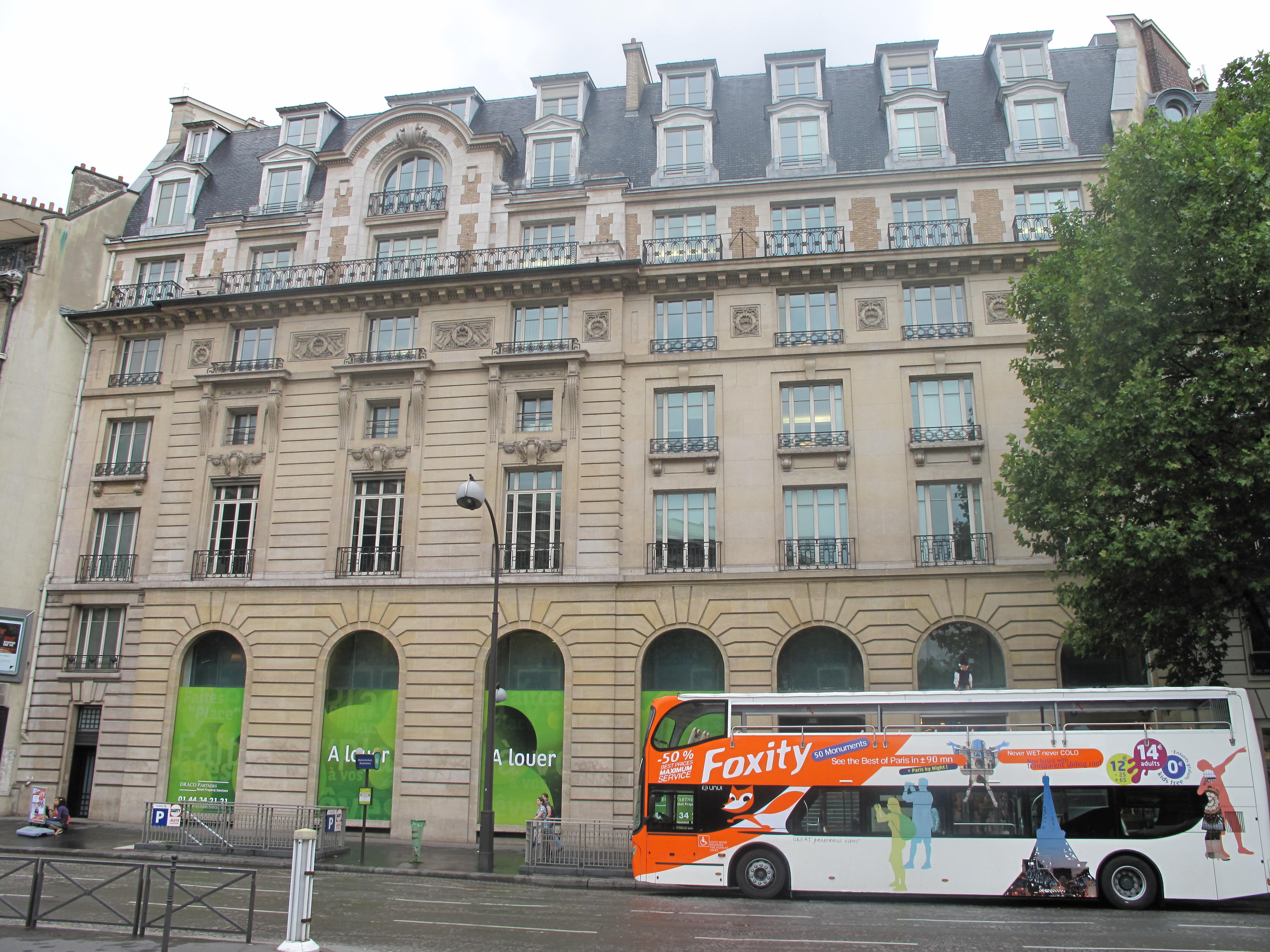
The former head office in central Paris

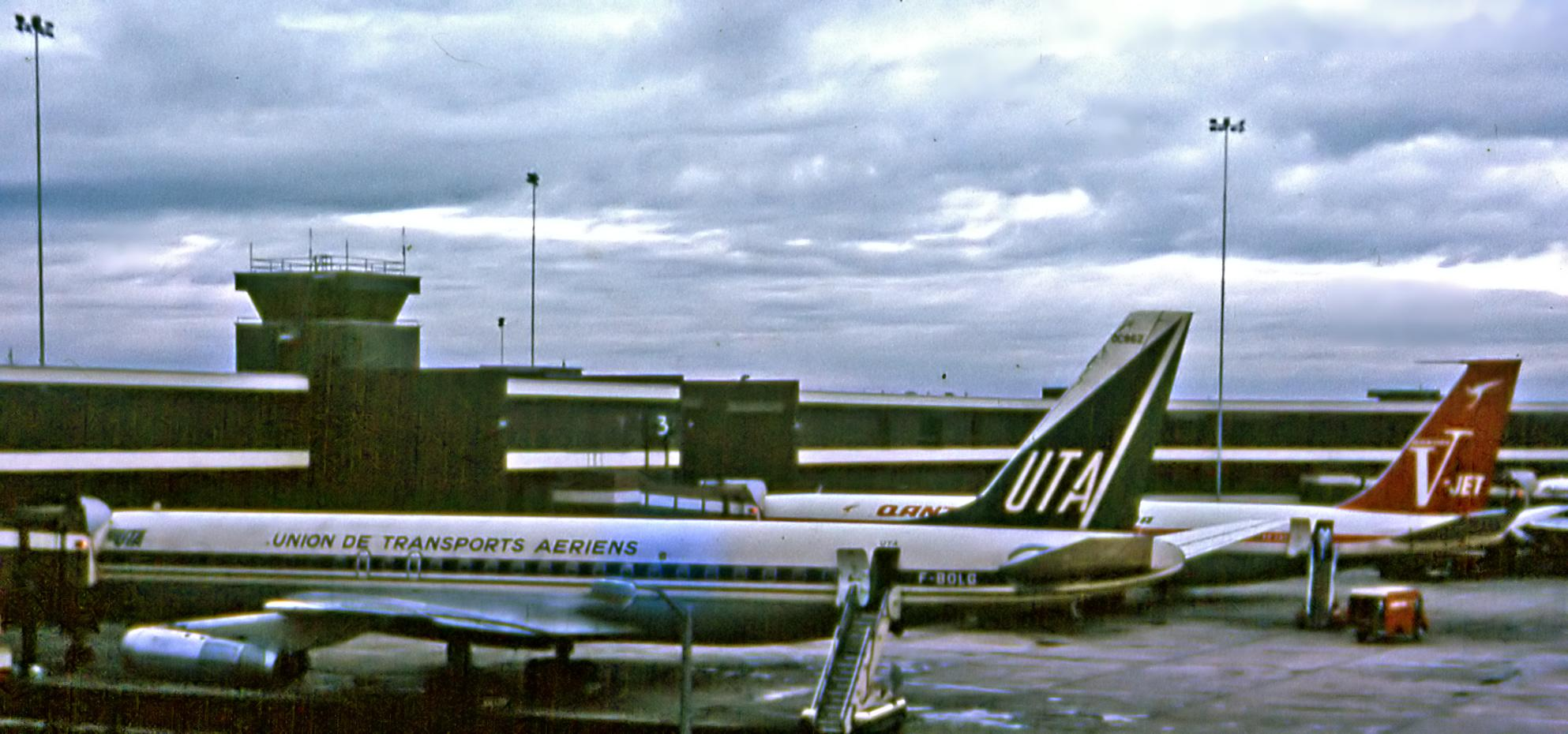
A UTA Douglas DC-8 at Sydney Airport in 1969

The decision to merge Union Aéromaritime de Transport (UAT) (Note: based at Paris Le Bourget) with Transports Aériens Intercontinentaux (TAI) (Note: based at Paris Orly) was taken in September 1961, building on a commercial relationship between the two airlines that had begun in the early 1950s. UTA, the new company that succeeded UAT and TAI, came into being on 1 October 1963 with a capital of £2.6mn.

=== Formation and early years ===
At the time of its inception, UTA employed 4,900 personnel (including 630 aircrew) and inherited a fleet of 35 aircraft from its predecessors, comprising six jet aircraft and 29 piston engine airliners. These were progressively repainted in UTA's new livery, a combination of UAT's blue and TAI's green colour schemes. The inherited 118,000 mi (190,000 km) network spanned five continents. Most of these were intercontinental, long-haul routes connecting France with West and Southern Africa. On 1 November 1963 UTA introduced DC-8 jets on its flights from Paris to Lagos, Accra, Monrovia and Freetown. UTA's creation coincided with a new French aviation policy that established exclusive spheres of influence for UTA and Air France. Air France withdrew from UTA's sphere of influence but UTA continued serving the African routes it inherited from UAT in association with Air Afrique. This included UTA taking the place of UAT in the joint revenue sharing agreement with Air Afrique. In addition, UTA continued providing commercial and technical assistance to Air Afrique on the same terms as UAT.

UTA had the largest African network of any European airline, flying to up to 25 destinations. Its busiest scheduled route was Paris—Abidjan, served daily in both directions. UTA primarily operated long-haul intercontinental scheduled services linking metropolitan France with most countries in francophone West and Central Africa, a number of countries in anglophone West and Southern Africa (including Ghana, Nigeria, Liberia, Sierra Leone, Malawi, Zambia and Zimbabwe), as well as Angola and Mozambique in lusophone Southern Africa, South Africa, Libya in North Africa, Malta, the Middle East (Bahrain and Oman), South Asia (Sri Lanka), Southeast Asia (Indonesia, Malaysia, Singapore), New Caledonia, Australia, New Zealand, Tahiti and Los Angeles. (Note: via the Asia-Pacific route only) In addition, the airline had regional scheduled passenger traffic rights between Japan, New Caledonia and New Zealand, between South Africa and the French Réunion island in the Indian Ocean, as well as between Tahiti and the US West Coast.

Through most of its existence UTA was one of only four wholly privately owned, independent airlines outside of the US with a major, long-haul scheduled presence. (Note: British United Airways (BUA)/British Caledonian (BCal), Canadian Pacific Air Lines (CP Air)/Canadian Airlines International and Cathay Pacific were the other three contemporary non-US independent, long-haul scheduled carriers) Unlike its British, Canadian and Hong Kong independent contemporaries, for most of its existence UTA did not have a network of short-/medium-haul scheduled routes nor did it compete on any of its scheduled routes with Air France, the primary French flag carrier at the time. This made it an almost exclusively long-haul, intercontinental scheduled airline. It also made its scheduled route network complementary to Air France and Air Inter. (UTA and Air France used to co-ordinate their schedules at Los Angeles to enable passengers to connect between Air France's transatlantic and UTA's transpacific services.)

=== 1980s and merger with Air France ===
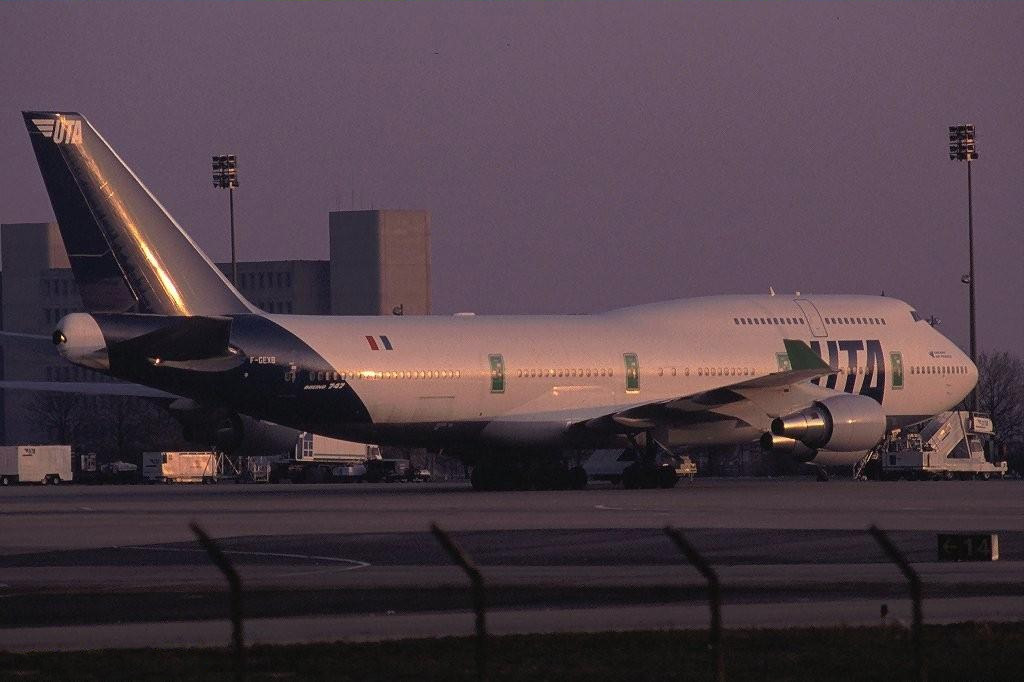
A UTA Boeing 747-400 in the early 1990s

In 1986 the French government unexpectedly decided to relax its policy of neatly dividing traffic rights for scheduled air services between Air France, Air Inter and UTA, without any route overlaps between them. The regulatory framework governing France's air transport sector at the time dated from 1963. It had prevented the country's three main scheduled airlines from operating outside their respective spheres of influence and competing with each other. The French government's decision to adopt a less rigid interpretation of its policy gradually reversed both of these rules. It therefore enabled UTA to launch scheduled services to new destinations within Air France's sphere of influence, in competition with that airline, for the first time. Paris — San Francisco became the first route UTA served in competition with Air France non-stop from Paris. (Air France responded by extending some of its non-stop Paris – Los Angeles services to Papeete, Tahiti, which competed with UTA on the Los Angeles – Papeete sector.) UTA's ability to secure traffic rights outside its traditional sphere of influence in competition with Air France was the result of a successful campaign it had mounted to lobby its government to enable it to grow faster, thereby becoming a more dynamic and more profitable business. During that time, UTA also planned to launch a short-haul European feeder network, which was to be operated by its Aéromaritime subsidiary. In the event, these plans were scuppered by a long-running, bitter industrial dispute between UTA's management and the unions representing the majority of pilots at Aéromaritime as well as at UTA itself. The dispute was about the introduction of new, lower pay scales at Aéromaritime to prepare it for the competition it was likely to face at the hands of Europe's new breed of much lower cost, aggressively expanding independent airlines, as exemplified by UK-based Air Europe at that time. It lasted for the better part of a year from the end of 1988 until October 1989 and resulted in the grounding of both Aéromaritime and UTA during that period. UTA's plans for a European feeder network were also overtaken by its subsequent merger with Air France.

1986 was also the year UTA lost its monopoly on the Paris—Papeete route to Minerve, France's leading contemporary charter airline.

In 1988 French Transport Minister Michel Delebarre partially reversed the French government's relaxed policy on allocating traffic rights to the country's three main contemporary scheduled airlines when he decided to deny UTA the right to fly non-stop from Paris to Newark in direct competition with Air France. The aim was to protect Air France's position as the country's dominant scheduled carrier by making UTA a less attractive takeover target for its foreign rivals in the event of a merger. The French government feared that Air France's smaller size relative to British Airways, Lufthansa and the US giants as well as its fragmented long-haul network put it at a commercial disadvantage in a liberalised air transport market. Air France, Air Inter and UTA were therefore encouraged to co-operate rather than compete with each other.

On 12 January 1990 UTA, along with Air Inter and Air France itself, became part of an enlarged Air France group, which in turn became a wholly owned subsidiary of Groupe Air France. On 18 December 1992, UTA ceased to exist as a legal entity within Groupe Air France.

Air France's acquisition of UTA and Air Inter was part of an early 1990s French government plan to create a unified national carrier with the economies of scale and global reach to counter threats resulting from the liberalisation of the air transport market in the European Union (EU).

== Corporate affairs and identity ==
=== Head office ===
UTA's corporate head office was located in the 8th arrondissement of Paris. The head office of the Compagnie Aéromaritime d'Affrètement subsidiary was in Puteaux in Greater Paris.

=== Foreign offices ===
In the UK, the airline operated a ticket-office for prospective passengers in 177 Piccadilly, French Railways House, in London from the early 1960s to the early 1990s, which also housed Maison de La France, the French Government Tourist Office, until its closure in the mid-2000s.

== Fleet ==
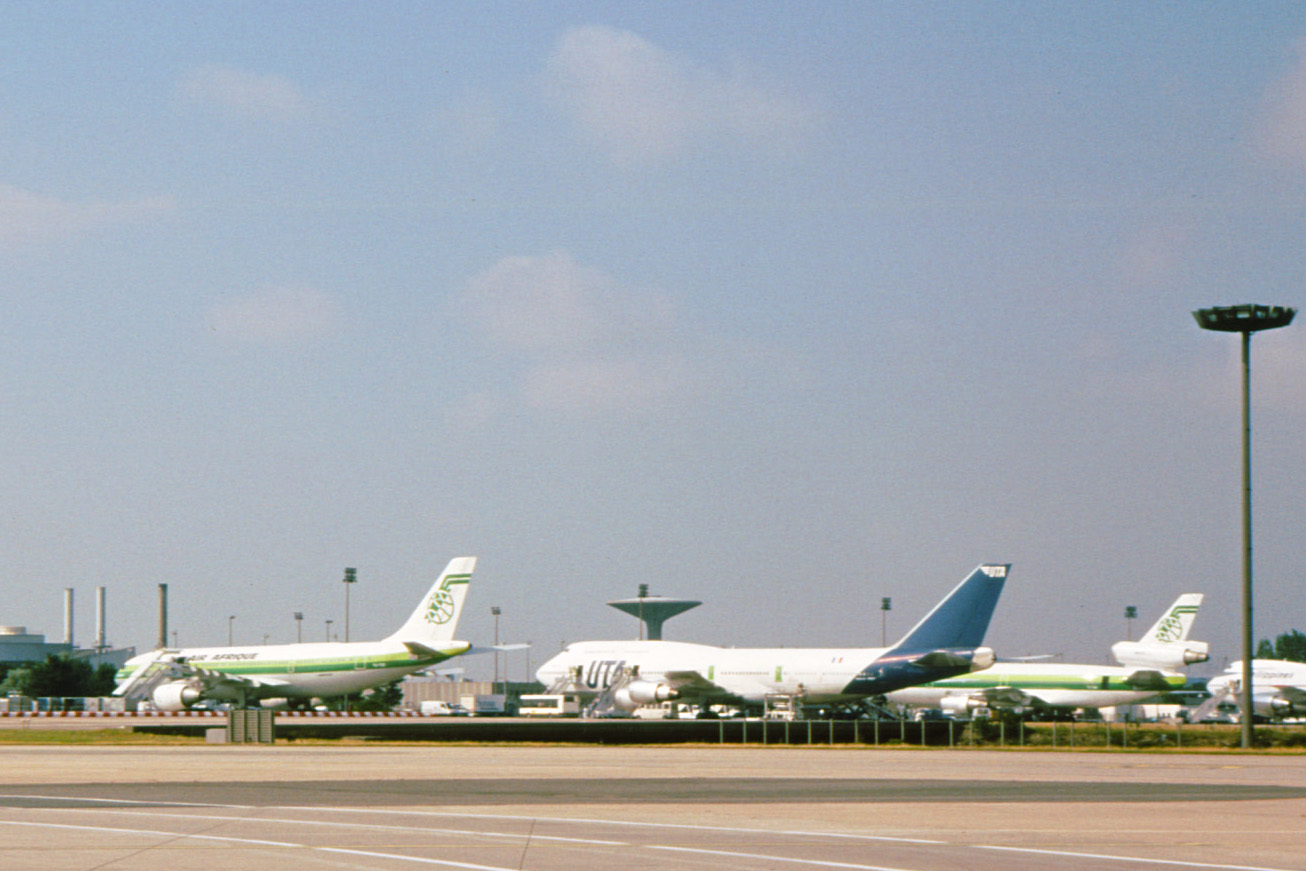
A UTA Boeing 747 next to Air Afrique planes at Paris-Charles de Gaulle in 1991.

UTA and its subsidiaries operated the following aircraft types and sub-types throughout its 29-year existence:

- Beech 18
- Douglas DC-4
- Douglas DC-6
- Douglas DC-7
- Fokker F27
- Sud-Aviation SE-210 Caravelle 10R
- Boeing 737-200
- Douglas DC-8-30/50 series
- Douglas DC-8-62/63 "Super Sixty" series
- McDonnell Douglas DC-10-30
- Boeing 747-200
- Boeing 747-300
- Boeing 747-400

Throughout most of this time, UTA's "mainline" fleet strength stood at about ten to twelve aircraft only. The airline's small fleet size was conditioned by the nature of its operations, i.e. as a long-haul carrier serving most of its routes as multi-stop sectors at low frequencies of less than one flight per day.

1965 marked the beginning of a re-engining programme that saw UTA's fleet of six DC-8 series 30 turbojets gradually converted to series 50 turbofan standard.

In order to facilitate the smooth introduction of the DC-10 into its fleet, UTA joined the KSSU (Note: each letter in the KSSU consortium's name represented the first letter of each of its members' names, in alphabetical order) aircraft maintenance consortium, whose founding members were KLM, Scandinavian Airlines (SAS) and Swissair.

In August 1981, UTA became the second customer to order the Boeing 747-300. (Note: after launch customer Swissair) It took delivery of the first aircraft to roll off Boeing's production line on 2 March 1983. The airline also had two Boeing 747-200s converted to 747-200 SUDs, (Note: SUD stood for stretched upper deck) thereby joining a select group of only two airlines that chose to have some of their 747-200s re-manufactured in this manner with the other air carrier being KLM. (Note: KLM was the other airline in this group that had ten of their 747-200s converted to -200 SUDs, respectively. The earlier tidbit of misinformation in this reference stated Japan Air Lines remanufactured two -200s. This is in error. They purchased two factory-new 747SR-146B(SUD)aircraft from Boeing. JA8170 was delivered in March 1986 and JA8176 was delivered in September 1986.)

UTA placed its first-ever order for Airbus aircraft in 1987. The order was for six four-engined Airbus A340-300 long-haul widebodied jets. It included an option on a further six aircraft. The aircraft on firm order were to be delivered between 1992 and 1994, at a rate of two planes per year. It was intended that the newly ordered A340s would replace the airline's ageing DC-10s as well as facilitate its future expansion into new long-haul markets from the early 1990s onwards.

In 1989, UTA also ordered Boeing's twin-engined 767 widebody on behalf of Aéromaritime. That order had a value of US$250mn. It was for three -300ER aircraft. Air France's acquisition of UTA in 1990 resulted in it inheriting two of Aéromaritime's three 767-300ERs, (Note: in addition to three of that carrier's subsequently acquired 767-200s) thereby itself becoming a 767 operator by default.

=== Fleet in 1970 ===
UTA fleet in 1970
| Aircraft | Number | Orders |
|---|---|---|
| Beech 18 | 1 | 0 |
| Douglas DC-4 | 1 | 0 |
| Douglas DC-8-30/50 | 6 | 0 |
| Douglas DC-8-62 | 1 | 0 |
| Douglas DC-8F | 1 | 0 |
| McDonnell Douglas DC-10-30 | 0 | 2 |
| Sud Aviation Caravelle | 2 | 0 |
| Total | 12 | 2 |

=== Fleet in 1978 ===
UTA fleet in April 1978
| Aircraft | Number |
|---|---|
| Boeing 737-200 | 1 |
| Douglas DC-8-53F | 1 |
| Douglas DC-8-55F | 3 |
| Douglas DC-8-62 | 3 |
| Douglas DC-8-63 | 2 |
| McDonnell Douglas DC-10-30 | 6 |
| Fokker F-27 Friendship | 2 |
| Total | 18 |

UTA also had one Boeing 747-200 on order at this time. The Fokker Friendships and Boeing 737 were based out of La Tontouta Airport, New Caledonia and used on local Pacific services. In addition, UTA's then subsidiary company Air Polynésie, based at Faa'a International Airport, Tahiti, had a fleet of three Fairchild F-27A Friendships, one Britten-Norman Islander, one de Havilland Canada Twin Otter series 200, and one de Havilland Twin Otter series 300.

(Source for the above fleet notes: UTA General Timetable 1/4/78 - 31/10/78)

=== Fleet in 1986 ===
UTA fleet in March 1986
| Aircraft | Number |
|---|---|
| Boeing 747-300 | 3 |
| Boeing 747-200B Combi | 2 |
| Boeing 747-200F | 2 |
| McDonnell Douglas DC-10-30 | 6 |
| Total | 13 |

UTA employed 6,569 people at this time.

== Destinations ==
Union de Transports Aériens served the following destinations when it operated:

=== Europe ===
- France
  - Bordeaux – Bordeaux–Mérignac Airport
  - Lyon – Lyon–Saint-Exupéry Airport
  - Marseille – Marseille Provence Airport
  - Montpellier – Montpellier–Méditerranée Airport
  - Nantes – Nantes Atlantique Airport
  - Nice – Nice Côte d'Azur Airport
  - Paris
    - Charles de Gaulle Airport (Hub; 1974–1992)
    - Le Bourget Airport (Hub; 1963–1974)
    - Orly Airport
  - Toulouse – Toulouse–Blagnac Airport
- Malta
  - Valletta – Malta International Airport

=== Africa ===
- Angola
  - Luanda – Quatro de Fevereiro Airport
- Benin
  - Cotonou – Cadjehoun Airport
- Botswana
  - Gaborone – Sir Seretse Khama International Airport
- Burkina Faso
  - Ouagadougou – Ouagadougou Airport
- Cameroon
  - Douala – Douala International Airport
- Central African Republic
  - Bangui – Bangui M'Poko International Airport
- Chad
  - N'Djamena – N'Djamena International Airport
- Congo
  - Brazzaville – Maya-Maya Airport
- Côte d'Ivoire
  - Abidjan – Port Bouet Airport
- Gabon
  - Libreville – Libreville International Airport
- Guinea
  - Conakry – Conakry International Airport
- Liberia
  - Monrovia – Roberts International Airport
- Malawi
  - Lilongwe – Kamuzu International Airport
- Mali
  - Bamako – Bamako–Senou International Airport
- Mauritania
  - Nouakchott – Nouakchott International Airport
- Mozambique
  - Maputo – Maputo International Airport
- Namibia
  - Windhoek – Windhoek International Airport
- Niger
  - Niamey – Diori Hamani International Airport
- Nigeria
  - Lagos – Murtala Muhammed International Airport
- Sierra Leone
  - Freetown – Lungi International Airport
- South Africa
  - Johannesburg – Jan Smuts International Airport
- Togo
  - Lomé - Lomé–Tokoin International Airport
- Zaïre
  - Kinshasa – N'djili International Airport
- Zambia
  - Lusaka – Lusaka International Airport
- Zimbabwe
  - Harare – Harare International Airport

=== Asia ===
- Bahrain
  - Manama – Bahrain International Airport
- Hong Kong
  - Hong Kong – Kai Tak Airport
- Indonesia
  - Jakarta
    - Halim Perdanakusuma International Airport
    - Kemayoran Airport
- Japan
  - Tokyo – Narita International Airport
- Malaysia
  - Kuala Lumpur – Subang International Airport
- Oman
  - Muscat – Muscat International Airport
- Pakistan
  - Karachi – Jinnah International Airport
- Singapore
  - Singapore – Changi Airport
- Sri Lanka
  - Colombo – Bandaranaike International Airport

=== Oceania ===
- Australia
  - Melbourne, Victoria – Melbourne Airport
  - Sydney, New South Wales – Sydney Airport
- French Polynesia
  - Papeete – Faa'a International Airport
- New Caledonia
  - Nouméa – La Tontouta International Airport
- New Zealand
  - Auckland – Auckland Airport

=== North America ===
- United States
  - Los Angeles - Los Angeles International Airport
  - Newark - Newark Liberty International Airport then known as Newark International Airport
  - San Francisco - San Francisco International Airport

== Subsidiaries ==

Compagnie Aéromaritime d'Affrètement S.A., in short Aéromaritime, was a French charter airline established in 1966 by UTA and which was at the parent company side for a quarter of a century. Aéromaritime ceased flying in 1991 after it had already transferred its operations within the European continent to Air France subsidiary Air Charter.

=== History ===
Aéromaritime was established by UTA in 1966. The task was to handle inclusive tour services and general passenger and cargo work. Flight operations began on January 11 of the following year with a few Douglas DC-6s but were discontinued in December.

The company remained inactive until early 1971. When restarted it held a contract to operate Super Guppy (AS-201) aircraft owned by Airbus consortium and used to transport oversize components of the Airbus A300B to the assembly plant in Toulouse. From the mid-1970s this became the only activity up to managing four ships of the capacious four-engine aircraft.

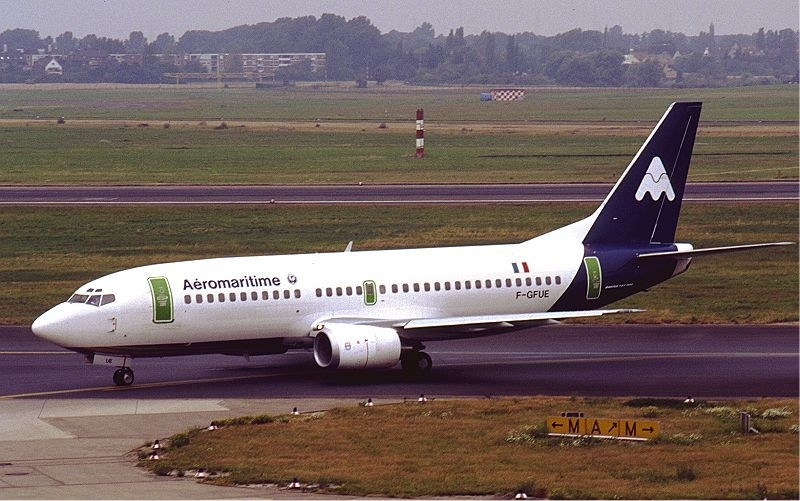
Boeing 737-300

In 1988 the airline underwent considerable expansion with the reactivation of full passenger operations. A number of European destinations were reached, many on Nouvelles Frontieres tour operator behalf, prominently using Boeing 737-300. This was supposed to be UTA's first step to establish a network of low-cost flights in Europe. In the event, these plans were scuppered by a long-running, bitter industrial relations/industrial dispute between the management and the trade unions representing the majority of pilots at Aéromaritime as well as at UTA itself. The dispute was about the introduction of new, lower pay scales at Aéromaritime to prepare it for the competition it was likely to face at the hands of Europe's new wave of low-cost, aggressively expanding independent airlines (Air Europe at that time). It lasted from the end of 1988 until October 1989 and resulted in the grounding of both Aéromaritime and UTA during that period. UTA's plans for a European network were also overtaken by its subsequent merger with Air France (already a 54,8% shareholder).

In April 1990 a short-lived corporate name change to Aéromaritime International was made. In fact, in anticipation of the merger, between 1989 and 1990 all European operations were transferred to Air Charter, a subsidiary of Air France. Aéromaritime ceased operations in October 1991 and was dissolved shortly thereafter.

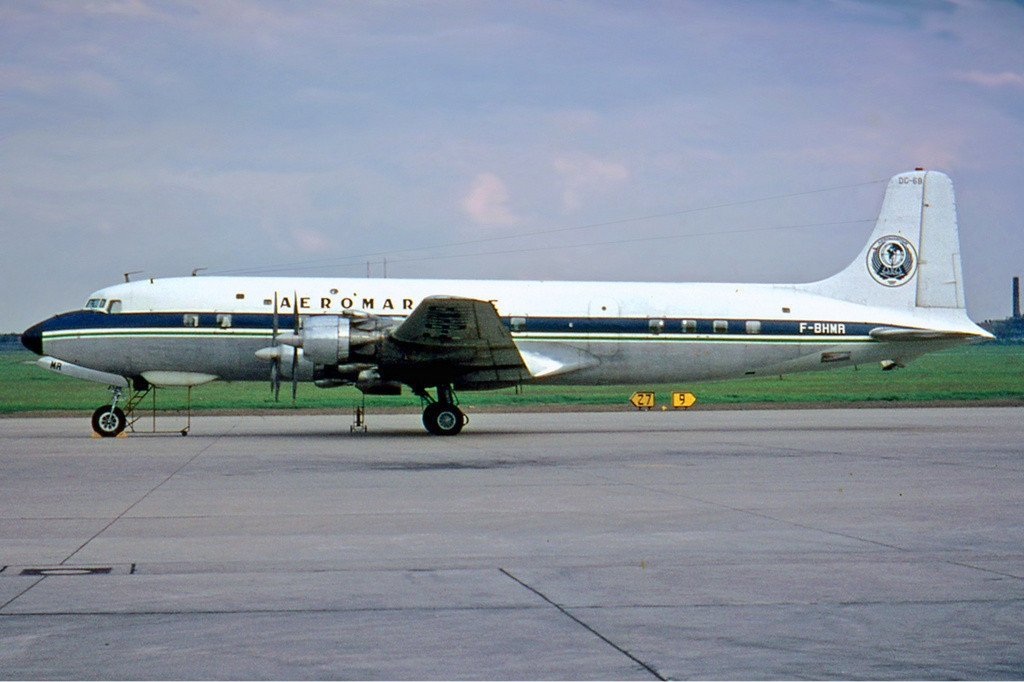
Douglas DC-6B

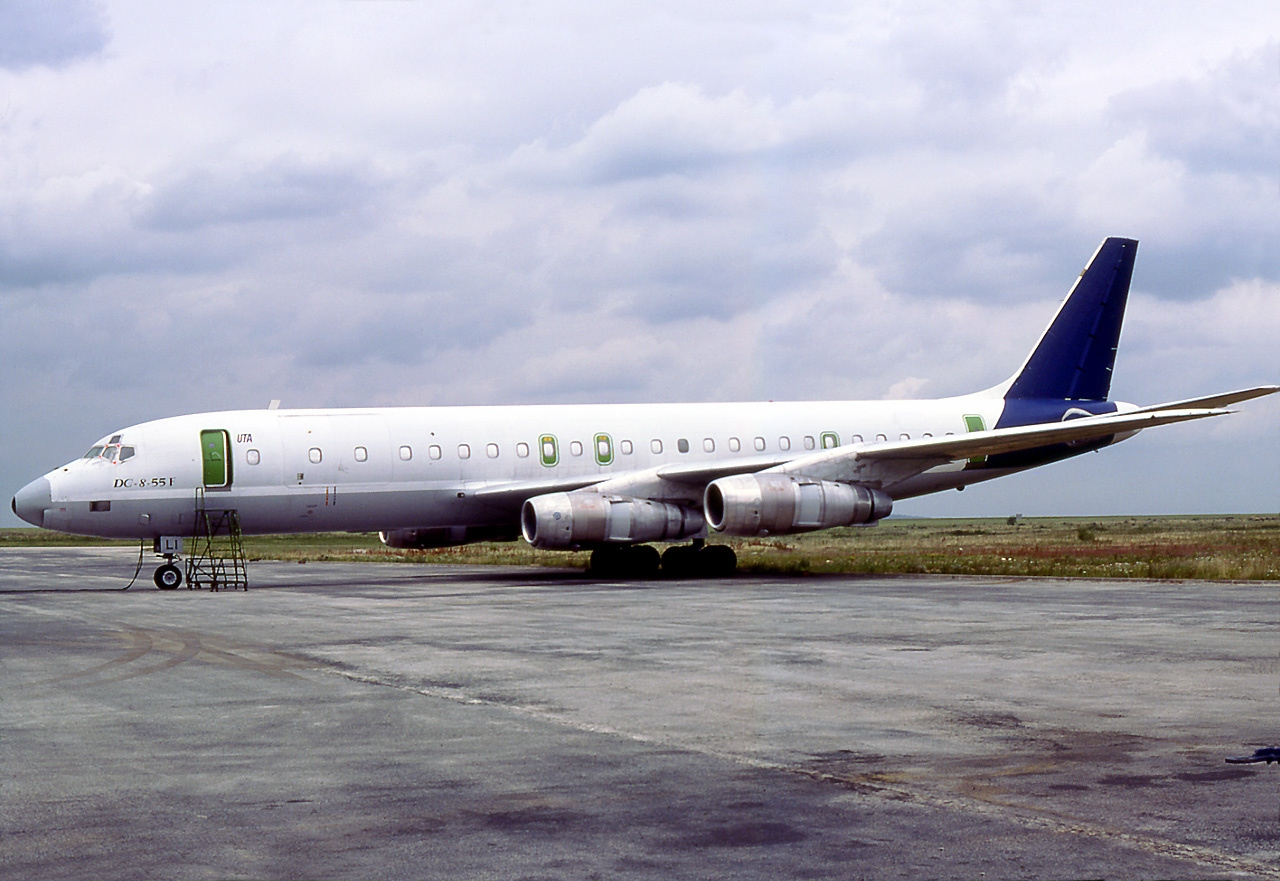
Douglas DC-8

Apart from early Douglas DC-6s, the airline never owned any aircraft of its own; all operations were always conducted using UTA fleet unused capacity. Nevertheless, over the years, Caravelles and six Boeing 737s were used, until the more capacious two Boeing 767s, Douglas DC-10s, and four Boeing 747s were made available by the parent company.

Aeromaritime fleet in 1970
| Aircraft | Number |
|---|---|
| Douglas DC-6A | 1 |
| Douglas DC-6B | 1 |
| Aerospacelines Super Guppy | 1 |
| Total | 3 |

== Incidents and accidents ==
There were six recorded incidents/accidents involving UTA aircraft. Four of these involved the loss of aircraft and three the loss of lives.

- On 2 October 1964, a UTA Douglas DC-6B inherited from predecessor UAT (registration F-BHMS) crashed into Mt. Alcazaba near Granada, Andalusia, in Southern Spain. The doomed aircraft was operating the airline's scheduled sector from Palma de Mallorca, Balearic Islands, Spain, to Port Étienne (as Nouadhibou was known then), Mauritania. There were no survivors among the aircraft's 80 occupants (seven crew and 73 passengers).
- On 12 July 1972, a scheduled UTA flight en route from Abidjan, Côte d'Ivoire, to Paris was taken over by hijackers. There were two fatalities as a result of this incident.
- On 10 March 1984, a UTA DC-8-63PF (registration F-BOLL) flying from Brazzaville, Republic of Congo, to Paris CDG with an intermediate stop at N'Djamena in Chad was destroyed, following two consecutive bomb explosions on board the aircraft while it was on the ground at N'Djamena Airport. There were no fatalities since all passengers and crew managed to evacuate the aircraft before the second explosion in the central baggage compartment tore the aircraft apart.
- On 16 March 1985, a UTA Boeing 747-3B3 (registration F-GDUA) was destroyed on the ground at Paris CDG when a fire was accidentally started while cleaning of the aircraft's cabin was in progress. (According to contemporary press reports, the fire was allegedly started by a cleaner who carelessly dropped a burning cigarette in one of the toilets.) The fire rapidly spread, engulfing the entire cabin in flames. This resulted in the aircraft's total destruction, which was subsequently written off. There were no injuries as a result of this incident.
- On 19 September 1989, UTA Flight 772, a McDonnell Douglas DC-10-30, registered as N54629, operating the Brazzaville – N'Djamena – Paris CDG sector, was bombed 46 minutes after take-off from N'Djamena causing the aircraft to crash while flying over Niger. Investigations and court cases have implicated Libyan state actors in the bombing. All 156 passengers and 14 crew members on board were killed. For nearly 20 years, this incident marked the deadliest air disaster involving a French-operated airliner. As of June 2009, it ranks as the second-deadliest (see Air France Flight 447) (This incident was briefly noted in Neil Peart's book The Masked Rider: Cycling in West Africa as he was on this flight just months prior.)

== Notes and citations ==
Notes

Citations
