= Spantax Flight 995 =

1982 aviation accident in Spain

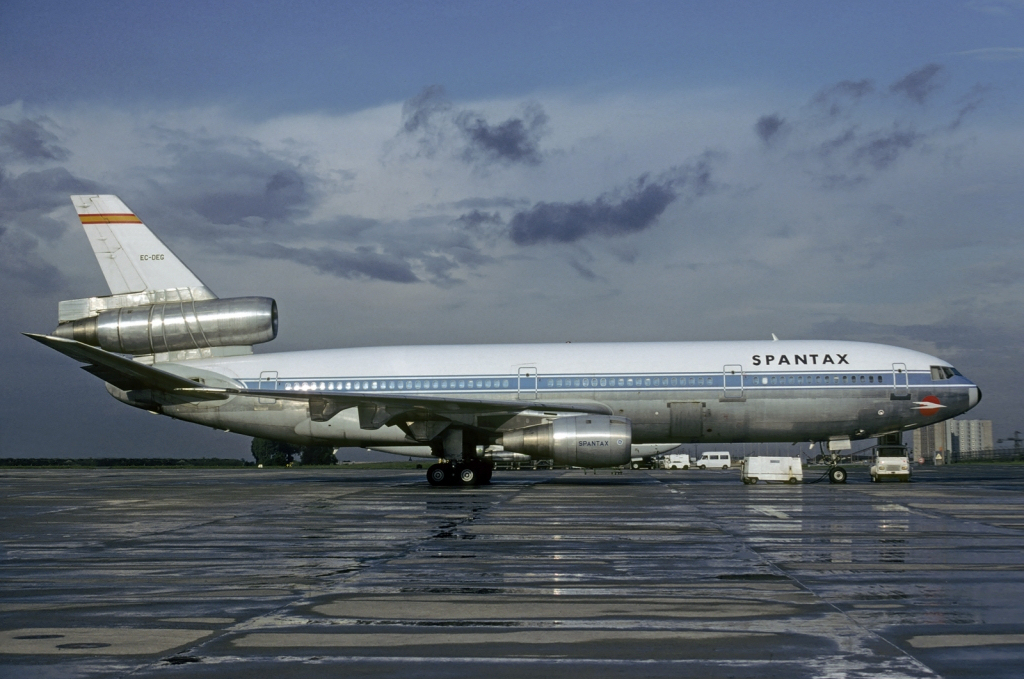
- EC-DEG, the aircraft involved in the accident, pictured in 1981

Accident
- Date: 13 September 1982
- Summary: Aborted take-off resulting runway overrun
- Site: Málaga Airport, Málaga, Spain; 36°39′48″N 4°29′03″W
- Total fatalities: 50
- Total injuries: 111

Aircraft
- Aircraft type: McDonnell Douglas DC-10-30CF
- Operator: Spantax
- IATA flight No.: BX995
- ICAO flight No.: BXS995
- Call sign: SPANTAX 995
- Registration: EC-DEG
- Flight origin: Madrid–Barajas Airport, Madrid, Spain
- Stopover: Málaga Airport, Málaga, Spain
- Destination: John F. Kennedy International Airport, New York City, New York, United States
- Occupants: 394
- Passengers: 381
- Crew: 13
- Fatalities: 50
- Injuries: 110
- Survivors: 344

Ground casualties
- Ground injuries: 1

Spantax Flight 995 was an international charter flight from Madrid–Barajas Airport to New York via Málaga Airport. On 13 September 1982, when the DC-10 aircraft was rolling on take-off from Malaga, the pilot felt a strong and worsening vibration and aborted the take-off. The aircraft was unable to stop on the remaining runway and overran, hitting numerous structures, crossing a nearby highway, colliding with 3 vehicles and catching fire. A total of 50 people were killed in the accident.

Spanish investigators concluded that the crash was mainly caused by a faulty nose wheel tire. A failure on one of the tyres' treads created a worsening vibration during the take-off roll. The crew decided to abort but due to the aircraft's speed and the lack of remaining runway, the aircraft overran the runway and crashed. The decision to abort the take-off, however, was deemed as reasonable.

== Aircraft ==
The aircraft involved in the accident was a 5-year-old McDonnell Douglas DC-10-30CF. It was delivered to Overseas National Airways (ONA) on June 6, 1977. The aircraft was leased by Spantax in October 1978 and bought in December of that year. At the time of the accident the aircraft had 15,364 flight hours.

== Passengers and crew ==
The aircraft was carrying 381 passengers and 13 crew in two cabins of service. Officials from the United States confirmed that a total of 210 American tourists were on board, plus 165 Spaniards, of whom 85 were U.S residents. A tour company from Canada stated that 26 Canadians were on the flight. A Swiss national was also confirmed to be on board.

Among the passengers were Francisca Salazar and Natividad Cons, the sister-in-law and niece of then-President of Spanish flag-carrier Iberia, Francis Cons.

The captain was 55-year-old Juan Pérez, who had logged almost 16,129 flight hours, including 2,119 hours on the DC-10. The first officer was 33-year-old Carlos Ramírez, who had logged almost 6,489 flight hours, with 2,165 of them on the DC-10. The flight engineer was 33-year-old Teodoro Cabejas Barúque, who had logged 19,427 flight hours, including 2,116 on the DC-10.

== Accident ==
In Madrid, a total of 129 passengers boarded the aircraft, heading for Málaga as Spantax Flight 995. It arrived in Málaga at 08:20 local time. By this time, an undisclosed number of passengers had disembarked from the aircraft; a total of 251 additional passengers embarked on the flight. The aircraft was almost at full weight, with every seat in the aircraft booked. The flight's final destination was New York's John F. Kennedy International Airport.

=== Crash ===
At 09:58:50 local time, the aircraft was cleared for take-off on Runway 14. The flaps were set to 8 degrees, and the slats extended. The throttles were fully pushed forward. Just seconds before reaching a V_{1} of 162 kn (300 km/h; 186 mph), passengers and crew began to feel vibrations. Both pilots were initially startled by the vibration but chose to continue the takeoff. After reaching V_{R} (169 kn (313 km/h; 194 mph)), the nose was raised, and the vibrations got worse. At 175 kn (324 km/h; 201 mph), Captain Pérez, believing that he would lose control of the aircraft if he continued, decided to abort the take-off and pushed the nose down, slamming the aircraft's nose gear down and appling full reverse thrust and brakes.

As the aircraft rapidly approached the end of the runway, Captain Pérez had to quickly switch his right hand from the control column to the throttles to deploy the reversers. Unfortunately, his right hand slipped and engine No.3 did not go into reverse, causing a thrust asymmetry, only the No.1 and No.2 engines were in reverse. This caused the aircraft to swerve to the left. Knowing that there was not enough runway length to stop the aircraft, he ordered the engines to be shut down.

An audio-visual specialist at Pace University, Carlton Maloney, was recording audiotape during the take-off as part of a series of recordings of airplane takeoffs and landings. In the recording, passengers could be heard panicking and screaming as the aircraft started to lose control.

External videos
- Cabin recording
- Audio recording from inside the cabin during the crash on YouTube

The aircraft eventually left the runway, striking multiple landing lights. The engine No.3, on the right wing, slammed into an ILS concrete structure, causing it to detach from the wing. The aircraft then struck the airport's metal perimeter fence, crossing the Malaga-Torremolinos Highway, striking a truck and two cars, seriously injuring the truck driver. It eventually collided with a farm building with its right wing. The collision ripped off three quarters of the right wing and the right horizontal stabilizer, igniting the fuel tanks and causing a huge explosion.

The collision with the structures created gaping holes on the walls of the fuselage, specifically on the top part of the passenger compartment near the emergency door 4R. The holes enabled the fire to immediately enter the cabin, burning 8 people who were seated in the area to their deaths.

The aircraft eventually came to rest in a field about 450 m (1,475 feet) past the runway threshold.

=== Rescue operation ===
As the aircraft came to a stop, heavy fumes and thick smoke immediately entered the cabin, and passengers quickly got up and rushed toward the exits. The aircraft had lost its electricity due to the severity of the crash, and thus the pilots could not send evacuation orders to the cabin crews. The cabin crews immediately ordered evacuation and tried to reach the megaphones to address and guide the passengers; however, due to their difficult-to-reach location, they opted to quickly attend to the passengers.

There were three cabins inside the aircraft: The forward cabin, the middle and the aft cabin. Due to the destruction of the right wing and the subsequent explosion and flames, evacuation through the exits on the right side were not safe, so passengers were quickly ordered to leave the aircraft through the left side. The evacuation was chaotic, with passengers being trampled and seats were jumped over. In the forward and middle cabin, evacuation of the passengers was hampered as many passengers decided to take their bags with them. Some of them tried to open the overhead cabins to retrieve their belongings, causing a significant jam. The flight attendants in the forward and middle cabin managed to open three emergency doors, which were door number 1R, 1L and 2L.

Emergency door number 2R, which was located on the right side of the middle cabin, was initially not used since the flight attendant stationed nearby saw fires near the door, thus concluded that it was not safe for evacuation and opted to guide the passengers to the left emergency door. A passenger eventually decided to open it, and a total of 4 passengers evacuated through the exit. Due to the door being opened, fire eventually managed to enter the middle cabin.

Meanwhile, in the aft cabin, passengers were panicking as fire from the outside managed to enter the cabin through the holes and gaps and ignited the seats, causing further panic among the passengers. Thick smoke and fumes limited visibility, creating more difficulty in the evacuation. The cabin was also the most heavily occupied area, and since the impact had caused deformities on two of the four available exits, this created a heavy jam within the corridors. Three flight attendants seated at the back of the aircraft had tried to open the emergency doors number 4R and 4L; however, both doors were unable to be opened, likely due to them being deformed. The three attendants were quickly overcome by smoke.

As there was only one emergency exit that could be used by the passengers who were seated at the aft cabin, which was emergency door number 3L, a huge traffic jam occurred on the left corridor of the cabin. Many passengers had also tried to take their personal belongings before leaving the aircraft, further causing jam. Cabin separators had also caused the passengers to not know that there were other exits that could be used, causing passengers to still be heavily distributed on the single, emergency door number 3L. The fumes eventually incapacitated dozens of passengers.

Rescue services eventually arrived in less than 5 minutes. Apparently, one of the ATC workers had prepared to raise the alarm following the aircraft's botched take-off roll. Personnel from Malaga Air Base were also quickly deployed after noticing that the aircraft had overrun the runway. The first to arrive was the Spanish Air Force, followed by medical personnel from the airport. The Civil Guard, the National Police, the Red Cross were also involved in the rescue operation. According to the survivors, the first firefighter arrived around 30 minutes after the crash. Rescue services initially had difficulty accessing the crash site due to the traffic jam in the highway.

During the evacuation, the tanks began to explode as the remaining fuel had ignited. Some of the passengers had tried to help the evacuation and rescue operation. According to a recount from one of the rescue services, one of the passengers had managed to evacuate 10 fellow passengers from the aircraft before an explosion occurred. That same passenger was later found to be dead.

The surviving passengers were taken to the airport's terminal, where they were assessed for injuries. A total of 116 people were taken care of by medics on the airport's sick bay, while 49 passengers were transported to Malaga Carlos Haya Hospital for further treatment. Overall, a total of 110 people had sustained injuries. At least 13 passengers were treated in the ICU and were deemed to be in critical condition. Due to the slow evacuation, 42 people died of smoke inhalation. The bodies of those who died mostly were found at the aft cabin, particularly near the rear.

== Response ==
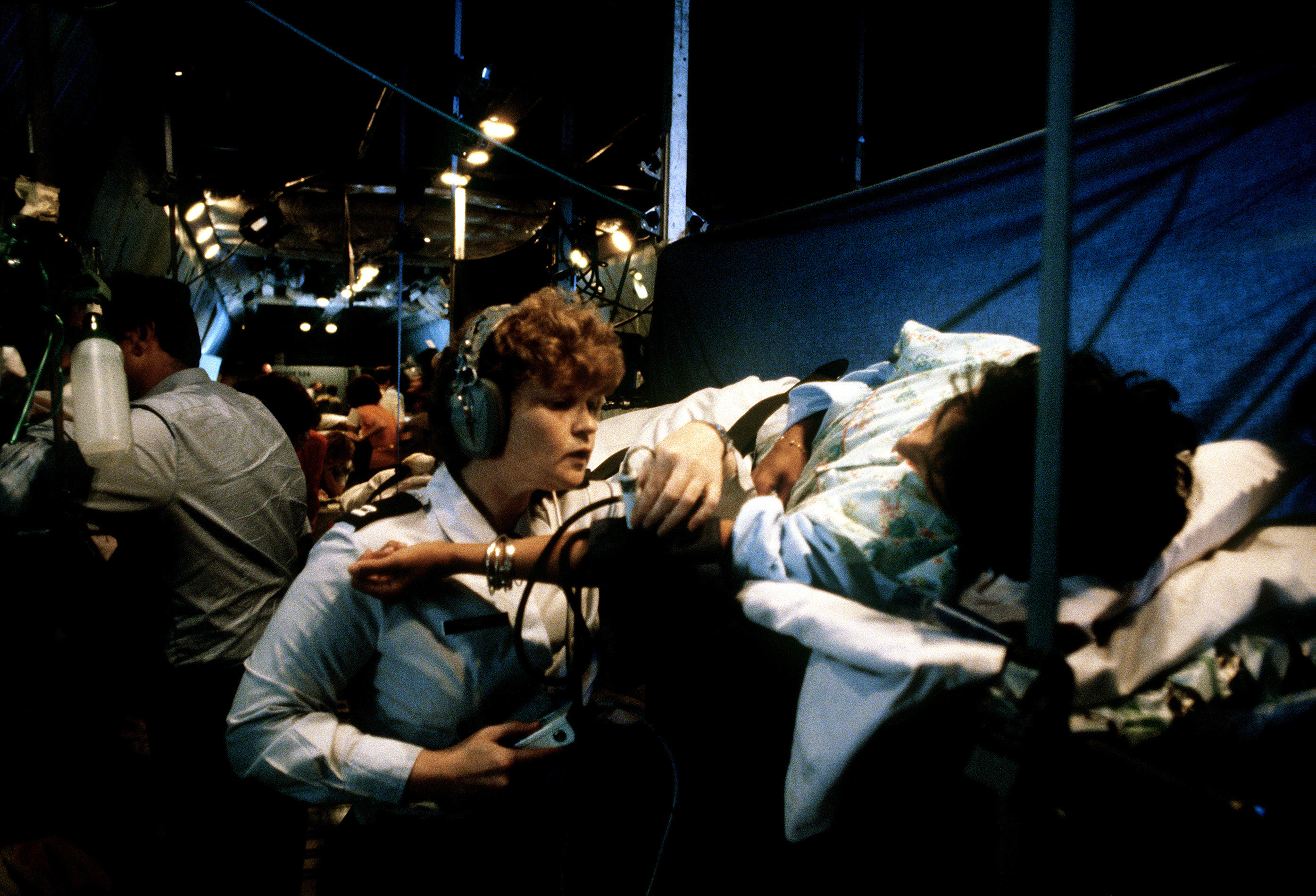
Injured Americans were evacuated to the U.S through special flights organized by the government

Immediately after the accident, the civil governor of Malaga, José Estévez Méndez, visited the site and directed the search and rescue efforts. Later in the afternoon, multiple high-ranking Spanish officials arrived at the airport, including then-Spanish Minister of Transport, Tourism, and Communications, Luis Gámir; President of Andalusia Rafael Escuredo; and Spanish Prime Minister Leopoldo Calvo-Sotelo. At the airport, Gámir announced that they were investigating all possible theories during a press conference. He later added the updated figures of the death toll, including those who were still listed as missing. Malaga's mayor, Pedro Aparicio, stated that they would provide everything for the care of the injured passengers.

In response to the crash, calls for blood donations were issued throughout Malaga. All hospitals were notified, and thousands of residents of Malaga lined up towards donation centers to donate their blood. Hotels across the city were used for temporary accommodation for the survivors and relatives of the victims.

During the salvage operation, the Spanish Civil Guard managed to recover two and a half million pesetas from a double-deck suitcase from the wreckage. The discovery might have pointed to a currency theft, as at the time of the crash only 800 pesetas were allowed to be brought out from Spain.

A memorial service was held at Malaga Airport for the victims of the crash. Relatives were flown to Spain, which provided free flights and accommodations. The identified victims were lined up inside a military chapel in simple wooden caskets. The service was attended by at least 500 people, including government officials. Surviving passengers, including several injured ones, also attended the service. Medical personnel had to carry some of the attendees during the service as their composure broke.

For American passengers stranded in Spain, the US government organized repatriation flights. A special flight operated by Iberia was organized for the survivors of the crash, who would be flown to New York. The government later set up more flights with the United States Air Force, sending a Lockheed C-141 and military and medical personnel from West Germany to bring the remaining U.S. nationals back home.

Following the crash, Spanish newspaper El País published a harsh criticism of Spantax. In the editorial note, the paper claimed Spantax had questionable company policies that compromised the safety of flights and deficiencies in multiple aspects, including lack of maintenance, overworked crew, and lack of fleet renewal. The newspaper stated that the 1973 oil crisis and its long-lasting effect had caused Spantax to introduce a cost-cutting policy, urging the government to intervene to avoid more accidents. Spantax defended the airline's safety record and called for calm as the investigation was still ongoing.

The accident also put a spotlight on the DC-10. It was the seventh fatal accident involving the type, putting more trust issues among the public on the safety of the aircraft. McDonnell Douglas said they wouldn't comment, as the investigation was still in its early stages. Several members of the public, however, had voiced their frustrations and called the Federal Aviation Administration (FAA) to step up safety modifications on DC-10s.

== Investigation ==
An investigation team from the Spanish Civil Aviation Accident and Incident Investigation Commission (CIAIAC) and the American National Transportation Safety Board (NTSB) was assembled to investigate the accident. The flight recorders were retrieved and sent to the manufacturer Sundstrand in Charlotte, North Carolina.

=== Cause of vibration ===
Following the crash, investigators discovered pieces from the aircraft's tires during a visual inspection of the runway. They were found scattered torn and fragmented. Recovered parts suggested the pieces originated from tire number. 2 of the front gear. The findings indicated that the tire had burst during takeoff. The recovered pieces indicated the separation of several layers' from each other. Examination of the pieces revealed the rubber thread that had keeping the layers together had worn out, showing progressive failure. The failure eventually caused a series of holes to appear on the tyre.

Investigators stated the faulty tire was the result of inadequate maintenance. The wheels were retreaded improperly, each layer of the wheels was missing adequate adhesive and the condition of the rubber strip that had kept the layers together caused further deterioration to the tire's structural integrity. Due to the faulty retreading process, "bubbles" began to appear in several areas, further weakening the adhesion of each layer. Exposure to high temperature during the takeoff roll caused the tire to burst, likely happened during the aircraft's rotation. This, in turn, created heavy vibrations that caused the crew to abort the takeoff.

=== Aborted take-off ===
Due to vibration, the flight crew rejected the takeoff and attempted to stop the aircraft within the remaining runway distance. However, because the aircraft had already passed the critical rotation speed (V_{R}) and only 1,295 metres (4,249 ft) of runway remained, it was unable to stop. The aircraft overran the runway, struck several obstacles, ruptured its fuel tanks, and burst into flames. In a post-accident interview, Captain Pérez explained that he chose to abort the takeoff because he could not determine the exact cause or nature of the emergency and believed that continuing would likely result in loss of control.

Aborting a takeoff after V_{1} was unusual, as aircraft procedures require flight crews to continue the takeoff once V_{1} is reached, unless the aircraft becomes physically incapable of flying. The investigation noted that pilots are generally trained to reject a takeoff only when a significant anomaly occurs before V_{1}. In Flight 995’s case, Captain Pérez initially intended to continue the takeoff but ultimately decided to abort when the vibrations intensified.

Although the decision to reject the takeoff after V_{1} was not standard procedure, investigators determined it was reasonable given the limited information available to the crew. Training at the time largely focused on engine-related failures during takeoff, so the crew did not recognize that the vibrations originated from the wheels. Believing the issue could be an engine problem, they initially continued past V_{1}, as the aircraft could still fly with two functioning engines. However, when rotation began and the nose lifted, the vibrations worsened dramatically, leading Captain Pérez to believe the aircraft might become uncontrollable if they proceeded.

Even after the abort decision, the crew still misinterpreted the source of the vibrations. The nose gear was located directly beneath and slightly behind the cockpit, causing the vibrations to feel as if they originated from the rear of the aircraft. The crew also did not feel vibration through the rudder pedals, which would typically occur with a wheel failure. Because the abort occurred at V_{R}—169 knots—and much of the runway had already been used, the crew applied maximum braking and thrust reversers to avoid an overrun.

The aircraft was configured with a flap setting of only 8 degrees, which required more stopping distance. Investigators concluded that had the flaps been set to 15 or 18 degrees, the aircraft still would have overrun the runway, but the stopping distance required would have been less.

=== Failed evacuation ===
The majority of the casualties were caused by smoke inhalation, directly caused by the chaotic evacuation of the occupants. Shortly after the crash, the evacuation order could not be announced, as the aircraft had suffered an electrical failure. The flight attendants couldn't go to the location where megaphones were stored due to difficult access. The crash created holes in the fuselage walls, fire and smoke quickly filled the cabin, causing passengers to panic. The lack of megaphones caused the cabin crew to lose control. Survivors recounted that many of the passengers were trampled and shoved, and some even jumped over seats to reach emergency exits as quickly as possible.

The passengers in the forward cabin were able to evacuate safely, as available doors for evacuation were used properly, hence minimizing any blockage from forming. In the middle cabin, the doors were limited to three of the four doors, one of which could not be used because fire outside the door intensified and prevented its use. Many of the passengers and cabin crew seated in the forward and middle cabins survived the disaster.

The most populated area of the aircraft, the rear cabin, was where most of the casualties were located. Following the crash, both exit doors on the tailplane could not be used due to deformations the crash caused. The force of the crash created gaping holes on the walls, specifically near the 4R door, causing flames and fumes to enter. The crash caused a massive inferno on the right side, passengers were ordered to evacuate through the left side instead. Since both exit doors on the rear could not be used, the only door available was a single exit door on the left, door 3L.

With only a single door available for evacuation, the left corridor immediately became packed, and the area around the door became a chokepoint. The situation was worsened by the fact some passengers tried to grab personal belongings and suitcases from overhead bins. The flight attendants seated at the rear tried to open other doors but quickly succumbed to the rapidly intensifying fires and smoke inside the cabin. As visibility fell, aggravated by destruction of a slide on a door due to the crash, the evacuation was conducted at a slow pace. Passengers at the back began to panic and many were trampled and shoved. Passengers in the forward and middle cabins managed to get out more swiftly than those in the rear cabin, the investigation noted that passengers in the rear cabin could have used the exits in the forward and middle cabins. However, due to the presence of cabin separators and reduced visibility from dense smoke, passengers could not evacuate through doors at the front.

=== Conclusion ===
The CIAIAC determined the crash was caused by a rejected takeoff due to vibrations originating from a faulty nose tyre. The nose wheel, tyre no. 2, had been improperly retreaded causeing the tire to fail. The captain's decision to abort the takeoff was deemed reasonable considering his inability to identify the failure due to lack of time identifying the source and lack of training for tyre failures during takeoff. Following the crash, the commission recommended crews be trained on failures other than engine malfunctions and also called for passengers to be briefed on not retrieving bags and for cabin crew to be in reach of safety equipment like megaphones and flashlights.

== See also ==
- Galaxy Airlines Flight 203, vibrations after takeoff and pilot error caused the aircraft to stall
- Garuda Indonesia Flight 865, crew rejected takeoff leading to runway overrun
- British Airtours Flight 28M, a case of evacuation failure during aircraft fire
- Saudia Flight 163, a case of evacuation failure during fire due to crew error
