= Spantax =

Spanish leisure airline (1959–1988)

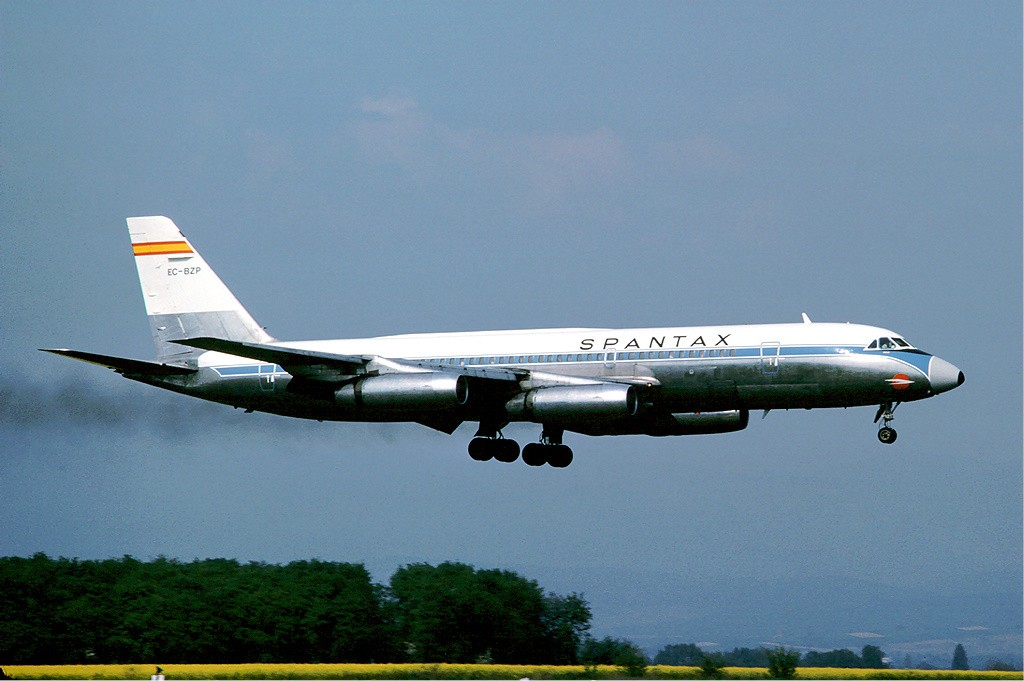
| IATA | ICAO | Call sign |
|---|---|---|
| BX | BXS | SPANTAX |
- Founded: 6 October 1959
- Ceased operations: 29 March 1988
- Hubs: Gran Canaria Airport; Palma de Mallorca Airport
- Fleet size: 14
- Headquarters: Madrid, Spain
- Key people: Rodolfo Bay Wright; Marta Estades Saez

Spantax S.A. was a Spanish leisure airline headquartered in Madrid that operated from 6 October 1959 to 29 March 1988. Spantax was one of the first Spanish airlines to operate tourist charter flights between European and North American cities and popular Spanish holiday destinations and was considered a major force in developing 20th-century mass tourism in Spain. Its popularity and image faded from the 1970s onward when a series of crashes and incidents revealed safety deficits, which, combined with rising fuel costs and increasing competition, resulted in the company facing severe financial difficulties that led to its demise in 1988.

== History ==
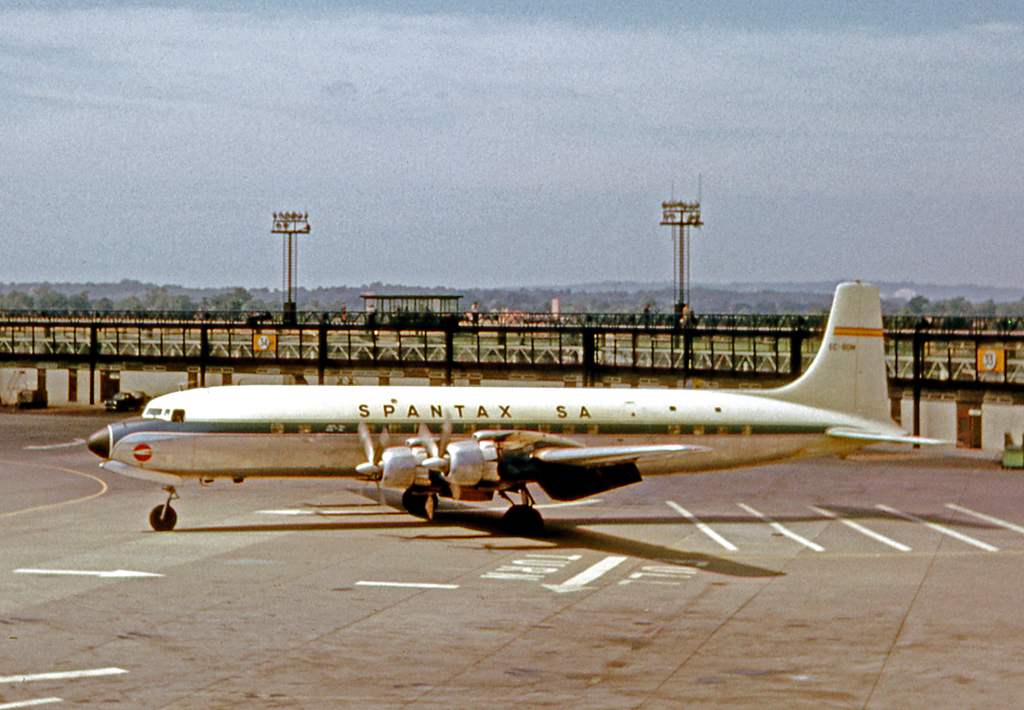
Spantax Douglas DC-7C in 1966

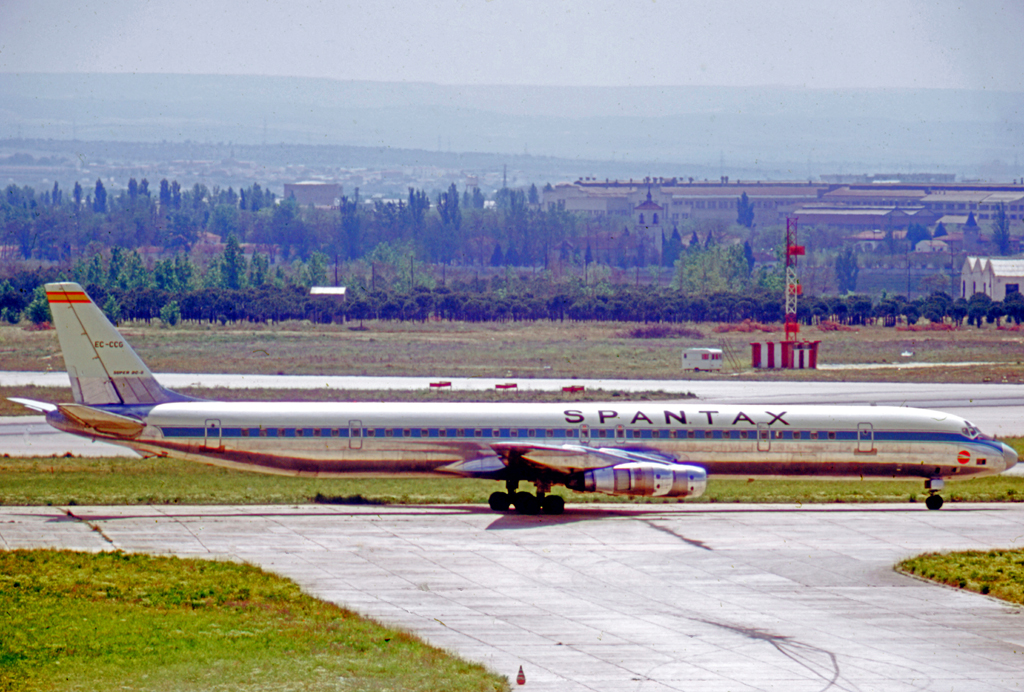
Spantax Douglas DC-8 in 1973

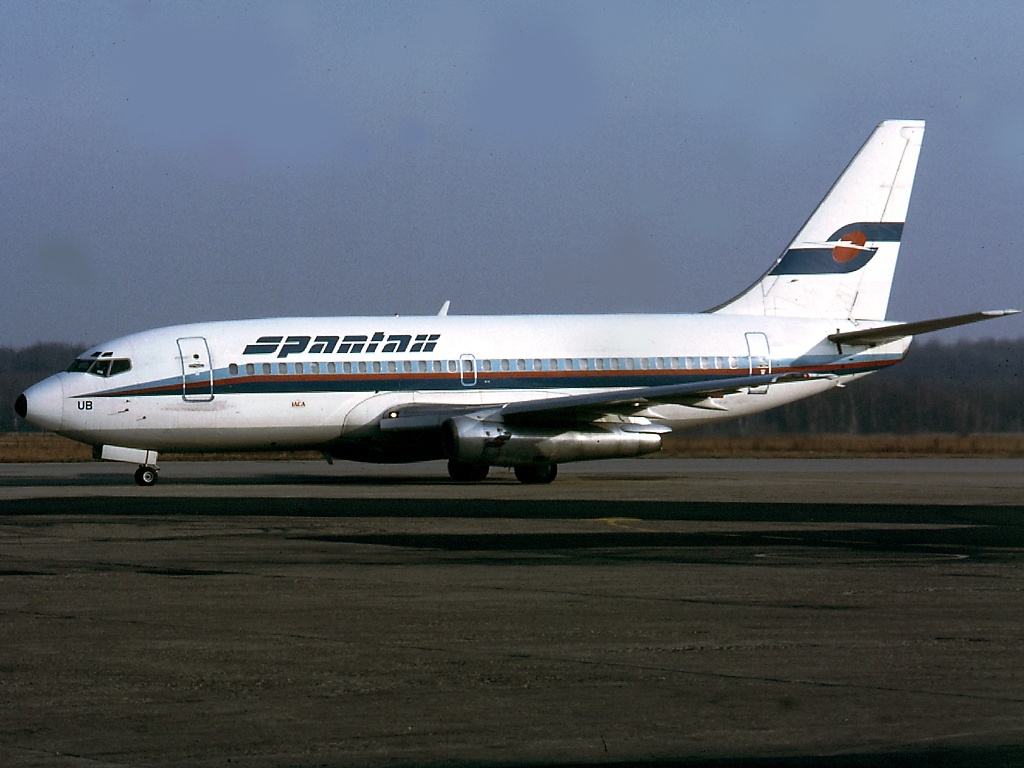
Spantax Boeing 737-200 in 1986

=== Formative years ===
Spanish Air Taxi Líneas Aéreas S.A. was founded on 6 October 1959 by ex-Iberia pilot Rodolfo Bay Wright and ex-Iberia flight attendant Marta Estades Sáez. The airline was based at Gran Canaria Airport in the Canary Islands, and began operations flying geologists and technicians who were searching for oil in the Sahara and Spanish West Africa. Initial destinations included El Farsia, El-Gaada, Itguy, Mardesiat, Tindouf, Dakhla, Lagouira and El Aaiún. In 1959 the fleet comprised three Airspeed Consuls, two Airspeed Oxfords, one Auster and a single Avro Anson. A Douglas DC-3 was added to the fleet in 1960.

At the end of 1960, the airline purchased two DC-3s from Swissair and these were placed into service from May 1961 operating tourist flights within the Canary Islands, and were joined by a Piper Apache for short flights. The fleet was joined in 1962 by a Beechcraft Model 18 executive aircraft, and a Bristol 170 which was leased from Iberia. The Bristol was returned to Iberia the following year, and four Douglas DC-4s were acquired; the first in the Belgian Congo and the other three from Aviaco. The pressurised long range Douglas DC-7C entered service with the airline in April 1963, and Spantax would eventually go on to operate eight of the aircraft which served destinations in the United Kingdom and elsewhere in Europe. Between June 1963 and September 1967 the airline also acquired an additional four DC-4s, and in May 1965 it obtained two Douglas DC-6s.

Between 1962 and 1965 the airline operated DC-3s and a de Havilland Canada DHC-2 Beaver on routes for Air Mauritanie, and in 1966 the airline became the first Spanish airline to operate the Fokker F27 Friendship turboprop, which was put into service on routes in the Canary Islands. On 7 December 1965, the airline suffered its first crash, when a DC-3 on a charter flight from Los Rodeos Tenerife to Gran Canaria crashed just after take-off, killing 28 passengers and 4 crew.

After receiving approval from the Spanish authorities to operate passenger charter flights, the airline moved its headquarters from Gran Canaria to Palma de Mallorca. The Balearic base was chosen due to the role that Mallorca had taken in the development of tourism in Spain, allowing the airline to gain prestige in the European market.

=== Jet age ===
The airline entered the jet age when in February and May 1967 two Convair 990 four engine jetliners joined the fleet after being purchased second hand from American Airlines. Between 1968 and 1972, an additional eight Convair 990s would join the fleet; two of which were leased to Iberia Airlines between 1967 and 1969 whilst that airline experienced delays in the delivery of its own Douglas DC-8s. The airline acquired a further four Convairs from Swissair in April, May and June 1975, and the airline would become the world's largest operator of the type. The last one was retired in the mid 1980s.

Requiring an aircraft with intercontinental range, Spantax purchased two stretched Douglas DC-8-61CFs from Trans Caribbean Airways in February 1973, and would go on to operate an additional four of the type. Two DC-9-14s were acquired from Southern Airways in April 1974 in order to meet demand on charter flights on domestic and European routes. In October 1978 the airline put into service its first wide-body aircraft, a McDonnell Douglas DC-10-30, and put it into service on charter routes to the United States. By 1980 the airline employed 1,168 people, carried 2,017,000 passengers and had revenues of 9.953 billion pesetas.

In 1983, Spantax became the first Spanish airline to fly to Japan via the polar route, with a stop in Anchorage, and in the same year Boeing 737-200s began to be added to the fleet, to replace the DC-9s. New flights from Palma de Mallorca to Turku, Kuopio, Tampere and Vaasa in Finland were begun with the 737s in 1984, and in the August 1984 the airline undertook charter flights to Venezuela with the DC-10s in conjunction with Iberia and VIASA.

=== Demise ===
By the mid-1980s, competition in the charter airline market in Europe was intense, and in conjunction with spiralling fuel prices, the fortunes of the airline took a turn. Having an outdated fleet, the company was forced to lease in 737s from SABENA, and two Boeing 747s and a DC-10 from Malaysian Airline System.

In 1987, plagued by financial troubles and labour strikes, Spantax was sold to the Aviation Finance Group, based in Luxembourg. The new owners had committed capital of 3 billion pesetas, and an investment of 4 billion pesetas. Debts to the Spanish authorities totaling 13 billion pesetas were reorganised for payment over a twenty five-year period, and a fleet renewal program would have seen the airline operating fifteen aircraft by 1993. Attempts to revamp and refinance the airline, renew its fleet with McDonnell Douglas MD-83s, and negotiate with China Airlines for acquisition of Boeing 767s were all unsuccessful. After the Kuwait Investment Authority withdrew from a planned offer to purchase the airline, Spantax ceased all operations on 29 March 1988, leaving some 7,000 passengers around Europe stranded.

== Fleet ==
Spantax operated the following aircraft over the years:

Spantax fleet
| Aircraft | Total | Notes |
|---|---|---|
| Boeing 737-200 | 8 | |
| Douglas C-47 Skytrain | 3 | |
| Douglas C-54 Skymaster | 4 | |
| Convair CV-990 | 11 | EC-BZR written off EC-BNM written off |
| Douglas DC-3 | 1 | EC-ARZ written off |
| Douglas DC-4 | 4 | |
| Douglas DC-6 | 2 | |
| Douglas DC-7 | 10 | EC-ATQ written off |
| McDonnell Douglas DC-8 | 8 | |
| McDonnell Douglas DC-9 | 6 | |
| McDonnell Douglas DC-10 | 7 | EC-DEG written off |
| McDonnell Douglas MD-83 | 4 | |
| Fokker F-27 Friendship | 3 | |

== Accidents and incidents ==
- On 7 December 1965, Douglas DC-3 EC-ARZ crashed on take-off from Los Rodeos Airport on a flight to Las Palmas. It was determined that the airplane went into a dive and crashed a few kilometers from the airfield, killing all 32 occupants, most of them Scandinavian tourists.
- On 31 May 1967, a CV-990 that was supposed to land at Hamburg Airport mistook runways and landed at Hamburg Finkenwerder Airport, the private airport of the Hamburger Flugzeugbau plane manufacturing facility, instead. Despite the runway being only 1350 metres long, far too short for the CV-990, the pilots managed to land safely and all passengers remained unharmed. However, it was an embarrassing event for Spantax, especially since it was a demonstration flight with journalists and representatives of travel companies on board, and Spantax CEO and co-founder Rodolfo Bay Wright was flying the plane himself.
- On 5 January 1970, a CV-990 crashed while taking off on a three-engine ferry flight to Zürich, Switzerland from Arlanda Airport in Stockholm after it had experienced problems with one of its engines. Five crew were killed. There were ten people on board.
- On 30 September 1972, Douglas C-47B EC-AQE crashed on take-off from Madrid-Barajas Airport. The aircraft was being used for training duties and the student pilot over-rotated and stalled. One of the six people on board was killed.
- December 3, 1972 — Spantax Flight 275 crashed at Los Rodeos Airport on the island of Tenerife while taking off on a flight to Munich in almost zero visibility, killing all seven crew and 148 passengers. The aircraft reached a height of 90 metres (300 ft) and crashed 325 metres (1,066 ft) past the runway. This was the worst crash in Spanish airline history at the time.
- March 5, 1973 — Spantax Flight 400, a Convair 990, on a flight from Madrid to London collided with Iberia Flight 504, a McDonnell Douglas DC-9-32 over Nantes, France. Flight 400 lost part of its left wing, but its pilots managed to land safely at Nantes Airport and saving 107 occupants onboard. However, Flight 504 crashed killing all 68 occupants on board.
- On 20 February 1976, an epidemic of typhoid broke out on the Canary Islands and other European countries after food prepared on Las Palmas was served aboard Spantax flights. Two German adults and one Finnish child died, and over 358 passengers suffered from food poisoning. The Canary Islands health board determined the presence of Salmonella Typhimurium bacteria in a mayonaise served aboard.
- On April 4, 1978, while landing at Cologne Bonn Airport, the pilots of a Convair CV-990 forgot to pull out the landing gear and the aircraft with 146 people on board slipped over the runway, resulting in the right wing catching fire. Two fire-fighting vehicles from the airport fire service that happened to be in the immediate vicinity probably prevented casualties in this accident. All 146 people on board escaped unharmed.
- In 1982, a Spantax DC-10, Spantax Flight 995, was preparing for takeoff at Malaga on a flight to New York when the pilot attempted to abort the takeoff. The fully-fueled airplane overshot the runway and hit the ILS equipment. The plane stopped 450 meters beyond the threshold of the runway and ignited. The cause of the aborted takeoff was a burst nose gear wheel. Fifty people died and 110 were injured.
