= Galaxy Airlines (United States) =

US airline, 1978–1987

Galaxy Airlines was a US airline based in Fort Lauderdale, Florida. At least 30 employees worked for Galaxy Airlines. The airline stayed in service from 1978 to 1987.

== Fleet ==
- Convair 990
- Lockheed L-188 Electra

== Accidents and incidents ==
In January 1985, Galaxy Airlines Flight 203, a Lockheed L-188 Electra, crashed shortly after takeoff in Reno, Nevada, killing 70 people and leaving one survivor. The airline was temporarily shut down and its aircraft were inspected, yet eight days later another Galaxy Airlines Electra, which had been inspected by the FAA, crash landed on a cargo flight with no casualties due to a landing gear failure.

== See also ==
- List of defunct airlines of the United States
