= 1970 Stockholm Spantax Convair CV-990 crash =

Aviation accident in Stockholm, Sweden

1970 Spantax Convair CV-990 crash
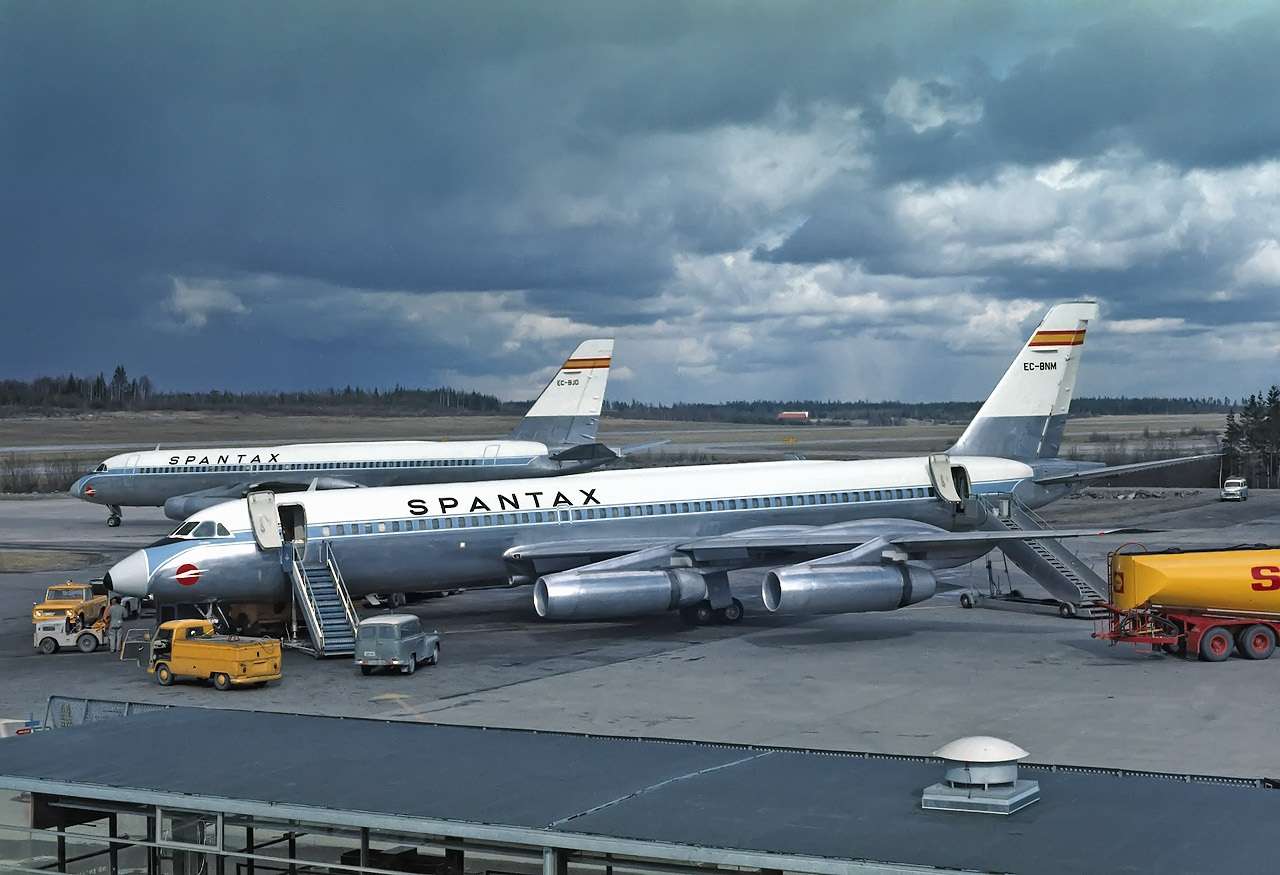
- EC-BNM, the aircraft involved in the accident, seen in 1968.

Accident
- Date: 5 January 1970
- Summary: Microburst-induced wind shear along with inclement weather
- Site: 1,800 meters southwest of Arlanda Airport Runway 01/19.; 59°37′40.81″N 17°53′51.35″E

Aircraft
- Aircraft type: Convair CV-990-30A-5 Coronado
- Operator: Spantax
- Registration: EC-BNM
- Flight origin: Stockholm Arlanda Airport
- Destination: Palma de Mallorca Airport (original); Zürich Airport
- Passengers: 7
- Crew: 3
- Fatalities: 5
- Survivors: 5

On 5 January 1970, a Convair 990 Coronado operated by the Spanish airline Spantax crashed shortly after take-off from Stockholm Arlanda Airport, killing five of the ten people on board.

== Background ==
The aircraft was earlier that evening about to fly to Mallorca with Swedish travelers, but at take-off the number 4 engine developed a fault. The take-off was aborted and the aircraft returned to the gate and the passengers were allowed to leave the aircraft. Later in the evening it was decided to perform a three-engine ferry flight to Zürich for an engine-change. On board were three crew members and seven passengers. There was a strong wind and −27 °C at the airport.

== Accident ==
At 22:24 hours the aircraft started its take-off roll on runway 19. During the take-off roll, the nose yawed to the right. This was corrected by retarding number 1 engine power from 85% to 80-60%. The aircraft rotated at 134 knots with 27 degrees flaps. While climbing, the aircraft banked 4-6 degrees to the right and the airspeed suddenly dropped to 10 knots below V2 (145 knots). The aircraft contacted some treetops, banked 10-15 degrees and crashed 1,800 meters from the point of lift-off. The plane ploughed a long road in the woods and broke into several pieces. The cockpit was separated from the rest of the fuselage and was wedged between tree trunks and hard frozen ground and tilted 45 degrees to the left.

First officer Miguel Granado was sitting to the right and became trapped when the seat pushed forward and both legs were caught up under the instrument panel. His right lower leg was broken and angled. His left foot was tightly pinched as well as his left calf and achilles tendon. Askew under the pilot was one of the aircraft maintenance engineers, trapped with multiple rib fractures. Granado held, without gloves, his hands on one of the fuselage pipes and tried to keep himself up and thereby relieve pressure on his friend's chest. Both hands received severe frostbite.

The captain escaped with minor contusions and was able to break free and get out. Aware of the risk of being motionless at these low temperatures, he walked around and tried to keep the body heat up and thereby escaped with minor frostbite on the hands and feet. They searched in the prevailing darkness and powder snow for the Emergency Locator Transmitter and could, after it was found, call for help. What the crew did not know was that there was a house where a family, asleep and oblivious to the accident, only a hundred meters from the crash site. The family later woke up when a police helicopter flew low over their house.

== Emergency response ==
Four hours after the accident the emergency response located the plane. First officer Granado who was trapped, had to wait over eight hours in the bitter cold before he was free. At the time of the accident, disaster preparedness at Arlanda was minimal. An ambulance was stationed at Löwenströmska lasarettet in Upplands Väsby 10 km south, but had no radio installed. Staff were sent out in white robes, and clogs on their feet to help the survivors. Five people, including a Swedish flight attendant, died in the cold weather.

== Investigation ==
The Swedish Accident Investigation Authority summarized the interacting factors of the accident:

- Unexpected early loss of external visual reference after take-off.
- Loss of directional control during transition from visual to instrument flying. The yaw created increased drag and yaw induced roll.
- The presence of a temperature inversion, which resulted in a down draught and speed loss.
- Presence of wind shear, which caused additional speed loss.

The group within the Swedish Accident Investigation Authority that investigated the emergency response pointed out certain deficiencies in the search and rescue systems, which later resulted in a reorganization.

== Aftermath ==
The Spantax accident was one of the events that caused the Swedish health care to develop both the disaster medical preparedness and equipment. They also began to set up emergency plans.

== See also ==
- Delta Air Lines Flight 191, USAir Flight 1016, Pan Am Flight 806 and United Nations Flight 834, all accidents where a microburst contributed to an accident.
