= Spantax Flight 275 =

1972 plane crash in Spain

1972 Tenerife Spantax Convair CV-990 crash
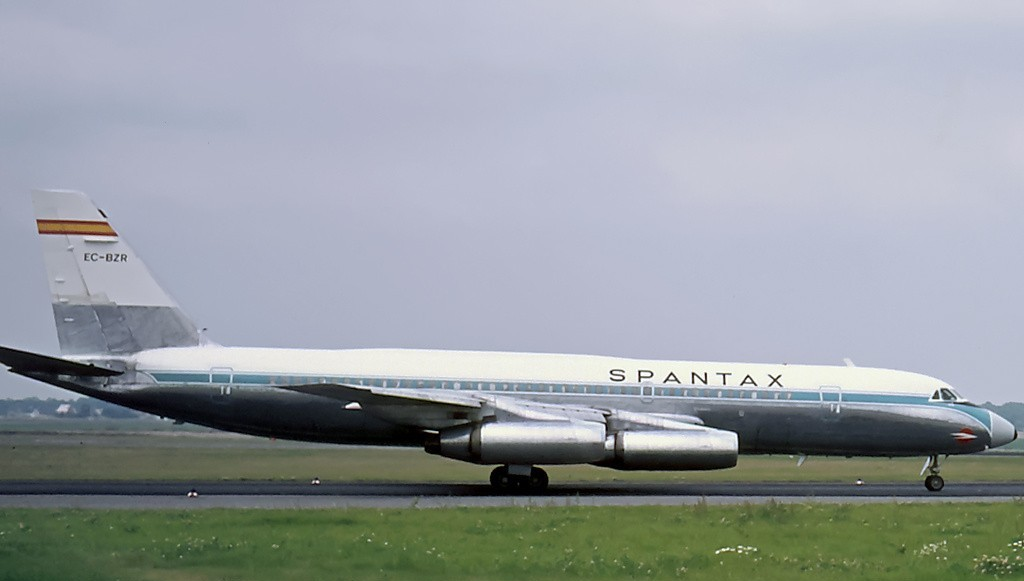
- EC-BZR, the aircraft involved in the accident

Accident
- Date: 3 December 1972
- Summary: Loss of control due to spatial disorientation
- Site: Near Tenerife-Norte Los Rodeos Airport; 28°29′1.33″N 16°20′36.20″W

Aircraft
- Aircraft type: Convair CV-990-30A-5 Coronado
- Operator: Spantax
- Registration: EC-BZR
- Flight origin: Tenerife-Norte Los Rodeos Airport
- Destination: München-Riem Airport
- Occupants: 155
- Passengers: 148
- Crew: 7
- Fatalities: 155
- Survivors: 0

On December 3, 1972, a Convair CV-990 Coronado charter flight operated by Spantax from Tenerife to Munich with 148 passengers and 7 crew crashed while taking off from Tenerife-Norte Los Rodeos Airport in Tenerife, killing all 155 passengers and crew on board. Many of the passengers were French tourists heading on a tour of Germany.

== Aircraft ==
The aircraft involved was a Convair CV-990-30A-5 Coronado registered as EC-BZR. The aircraft was equipped with four General Electric CJ805-23 engines.

=== Passengers and crew ===
Country of origin	Passengers	Crew	Total
France	148	0	148
Spain	0	7	7
Total	148	7	155

== Accident ==
The flight was chartered by the Landesverband Bayerischer Omnibusunternehmer, a community of Bavarian bus company owners. In command was Captain Daniel Núñez Ronda, a 32-year-old former Spanish Air Force pilot, who was accompanied by 36-year-old First Officer Francisco Javier Saavedra and 30-year-old Flight Engineer José Alberto Sanz. Conditions that morning were IFR with a reported visibility of about only 150 m (500 ft). The flight was cleared for take-off on runway 30 at 6:45 UTC. At 91 m (300 ft) the aircraft entered a steep bank and soon began to descend. The left wing hit the ground about 325 metres (1,066 ft) past the end of the runway, rupturing a fuel tank before the rest of the fuselage touched down. A massive explosion of the almost fully fueled tanks followed. All 155 people aboard were killed upon impact.

At the time, the accident was the deadliest aircraft crash on the island of Tenerife and the deadliest to take place in Spain until surpassed by the collision of two Boeing 747 aircraft at the same airport five years later. It was the eighth hull loss and deadliest accident involving a Convair 990 Coronado.

== Investigation ==
The investigation was conducted by the Spanish Police's air crash investigation council. German investigators also arrived, but were barred from investigating by the authorities. Due to the unstable political situation unfolding, authorities suspected a bomb could have brought the aircraft down. This was quickly dismissed after a close look determined no signature blast damage. A theory of engine failure was also dismissed early on. The investigators concluded that the captain had experienced a somatogyral illusion in the low visibility. The investigators also faulted the ATC controller for letting the aircraft take off in conditions it was not certified to fly in. The conditions were caused by clouds moving through the airport, a common problem. The board recommended that ATC should inform crews about the conditions via the newly developed ATIS, which was introduced about a year later. The council also recommended training on spatial illusions for pilots.

== See also ==
- Air India Flight 855
- Copa Airlines Flight 201
- Flash Airlines Flight 604
- Dan-Air Flight 1008
- List of accidents and incidents involving commercial aircraft
- Tenerife airport disaster
- Iberia Flight 401
