= Aerolíneas Peruanas =

Peruvian airline (1957–1971)

IATA	ICAO	Call sign
EP	PRU	APSA
- Founded: September 16, 1956
- Commenced operations: September 17, 1957
- Ceased operations: May 2, 1971
- Hubs: Jorge Chávez International Airport
- Headquarters: Lima, Peru
- Key people: C. W. Shelton (Founder)
- Employees: 1,000 (1967)

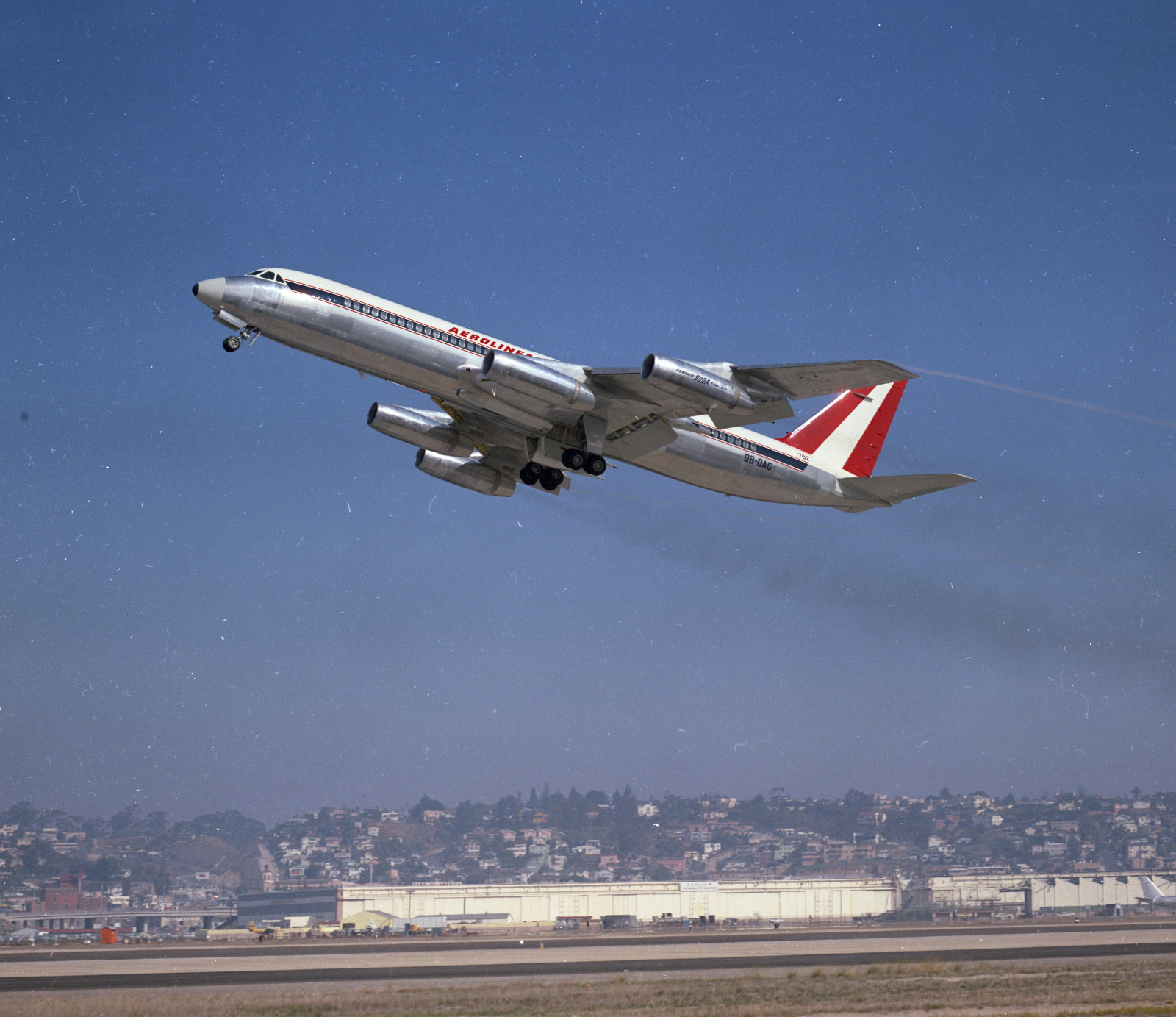
CV-990 San Diego 1963

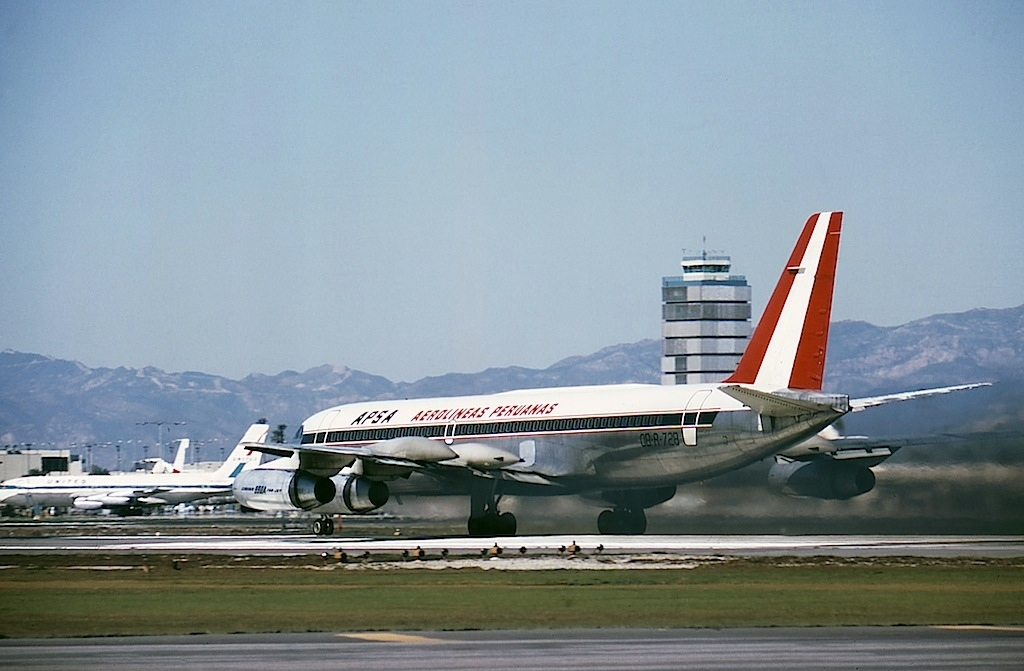
CV-990 at LAX

Aerolíneas Peruanas S.A. (also known as APSA or the English translation Peruvian Airlines) was an airline from Peru, serving as flag carrier of the country from 1956 to 1971. Headquartered in Lima, it operated a network of scheduled passenger flights to major places in Latin America, as well as the United States, out of its hub at Jorge Chávez International Airport.

== History ==
APSA was founded by C. W. Shelton on September 16, 1956, with 77 percent of the company's shares spread amongst private Peruvian investors. Flight operations were launched on September 17, 1957, on the Lima to Santiago and Miami routes. Originally not a member of the International Air Transport Association (IATA was only joined in 1966), APSA could significantly undercut the usual airline fares for flights between South America and the USA. To strengthen its market position, APSA went into a partnership with Transportes Aéreos Nacionales and Compañía Ecuatoriana de Aviación.

The Douglas DC-6 being the aircraft most commonly used with the airline in the early 1960s, Aerolíneas Peruanas joined the jet age on December 1, 1963 with the introduction of the Convair 990 Coronado. During those years, the network was greatly expanded, which culminated in the launch of transatlantic flights using the Douglas DC-8 by the end of the decade.

In the early 1970s, APSA found itself in a worsening financial situation. Plans for a take-over by the Peruvian government and Spanish national airline Iberia failed, so the company was forced to cease all flight operations on May 2, 1971.

== Destinations ==
APSA offered scheduled passenger flights to the following destinations:

Country	City	Airport	Notes
Argentina	Buenos Aires	Ministro Pistarini International Airport	
Bolivia	La Paz	El Alto International Airport	
Brazil	Rio de Janeiro	Rio de Janeiro/Galeão International Airport	
Brazil	São Paulo	Congonhas-São Paulo Airport	
Chile	Santiago	Arturo Merino Benítez International Airport	
Colombia	Barranquilla	Ernesto Cortissoz International Airport	
Colombia	Bogotá	El Dorado International Airport	
Ecuador	Guayaquil	José Joaquín de Olmedo International Airport	
France	Paris	Orly Airport	
Honduras	Tegucigalpa	Toncontín International Airport	
Mexico	Acapulco	Acapulco International Airport	
Mexico	Mexico City	Mexico City International Airport	
Panama	Panama City	Tocumen International Airport	
Peru	Arequipa	Rodríguez Ballón International Airport	
Peru	Lima	Jorge Chávez International Airport	Hub
Peru	Talara	Cap. FAP Víctor Montes Arias Airport	
Spain	Madrid	Madrid–Barajas Airport	
Trinidad and Tobago	Port of Spain	Piarco International Airport	
United Kingdom	London	Gatwick Airport	
United States	Los Angeles	Los Angeles International Airport	
United States	Miami	Miami International Airport	
Venezuela	Caracas	Simón Bolívar International Airport	

== Fleet ==
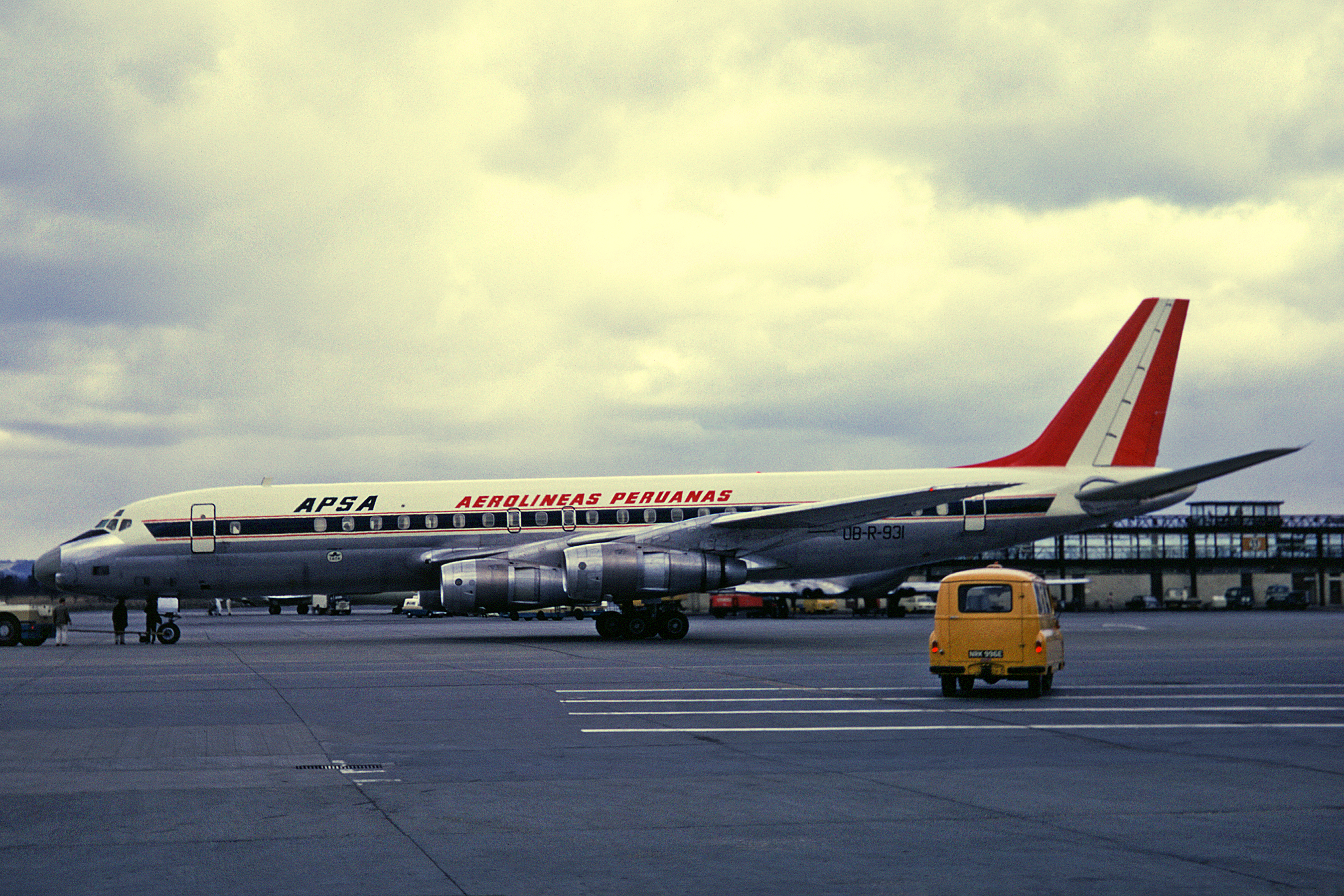
An APSA Douglas DC-8-52 parked at Gatwick Airport in 1969

Over the years, APSA operated the following aircraft types:

APSA fleet
Aircraft	Total	Introduced	Retired	Notes
Convair 990 Coronado	4	1963	1971	One left, N990AB. Ex OB-R-765 stored at Mohave, owned by Scroggins Aviation
Curtiss C-46 Commando	2	1957	1970	
Douglas DC-6	6	1960	1966	
Douglas DC-7	1	1967	1970	
Douglas DC-8-52	2	1969	1971	Leased from Iberia

== Accidents and incidents ==
- On January 11, 1969, a Convair 990 Coronado was hijacked en route a flight from Panama City to Miami and forced to divert to Cuba. At that time, such United States-Cuba hijackings had become common occurrences.

== Bibliography ==
- Schleit, P. (1982). Shelton's barefoot airlines. Annapolis (MD): Fishergate Publishing Co. Inc.
- Davies, R.E.G. (1987). Rebels and reformers of the airways. Airlife Publishing Ltd. & Smithsonian Institution Press.

== See also ==
- List of defunct airlines of Peru
