= Convair 990 Coronado =

American four-engined jet airliner (1962–1987)

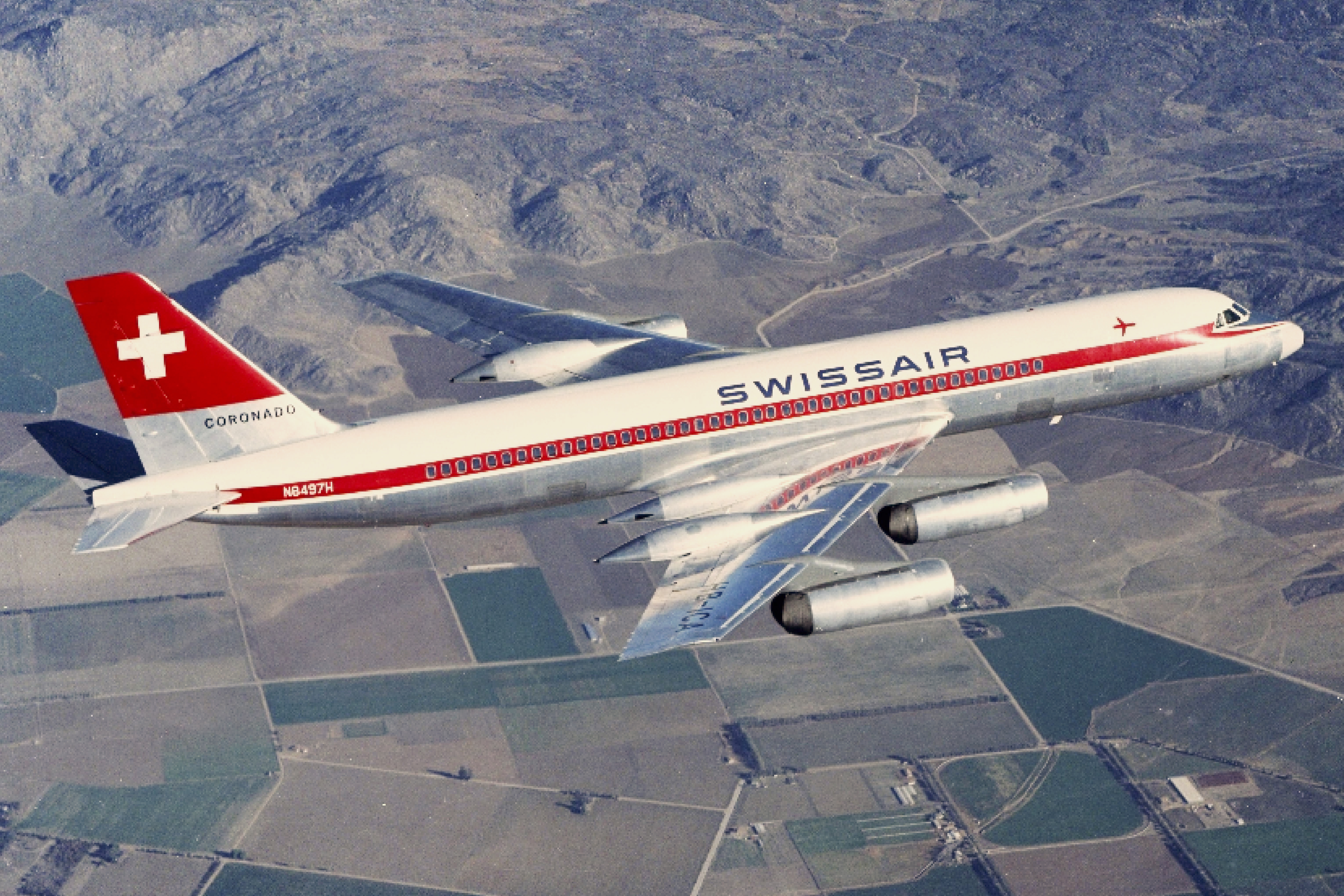
- The Convair 990 is a low-wing airliner with four underwing turbofan engines.

General information
- Type: Narrow-body jet airliner
- National origin: United States
- Manufacturer: Convair
- Status: Retired
- Primary users: American Airlines Spantax; Swissair
- Number built: 37

History
- Manufactured: 1961–1963
- Introduction date: 1962
- First flight: January 24, 1961
- Retired: September 1987 (1994 with NASA)
- Developed from: Convair 880

The Convair 990 Coronado is an American narrow-body four-engined jet airliner, produced between 1961 and 1963 by the Convair division of American company General Dynamics. It was a stretched version of the earlier Convair 880, and was produced in response to a request from American Airlines: the 990 was lengthened by 10 ft (3 m), which increased the capacity from between 88 and 110 passengers in the 880 to between 96 and 121. That was still fewer passengers than the contemporary Boeing 707 (110 to 189) or Douglas DC-8 (105 to 173), although the 990 was 25–35 mph (40–56 km/h) faster than either when cruising.

== Design and development ==
American Airlines asked Convair to design an aircraft for coast-to-coast flights, able to fly nonstop from New York City to Los Angeles against the wind after Boeing had flat out refused. They wanted a larger passenger capacity than the Convair 880 and 880M, which were the smallest of the first-generation U.S. jet airliners. The design was known as the Convair 600 and was redesignated the Convair 990 in the month of its first flight. The 990 began flight testing on January 24, 1961.

One change from the 880 was the large anti-shock bodies on the upper trailing edge of the wings, to increase the critical Mach by reducing transonic drag. The inboard shock bodies, which were larger, were also used for additional fuel tankage. Later during the design period, Convair modified the design to include fuel in the outboard pods as well, but during the initial test flights the extra weight caused the outboard engines to oscillate in certain conditions. The pods were redesigned once more and shortened by 28 inches (710 mm), causing increased drag. The inner set of pods were used to route the fuel-dump tubes from the fuel tanks, terminating in a prominent outlet.

The engines were also changed to the uprated General Electric CJ-805-23s, which were unique in that they used a fan stage at the rear of the engines, compared to the fan stage at the front of the engine found on the Pratt & Whitney JT3D that powered the 990's competitors. The engine was a simplified, non-afterburning civil turbofan version of the J79 turbojet, used in supersonic military aircraft. Like most versions of the J79, the CJ805 and CJ805-23 were smoky, although secondary operator Spantax eventually had their engines refitted with low-smoke combustion chambers in the 1970s.

Like the 880, 990s incorporated a dorsal "raceway" added to the top of the fuselage to house the two ADF antennas and one VHF antenna.

== Operational history ==
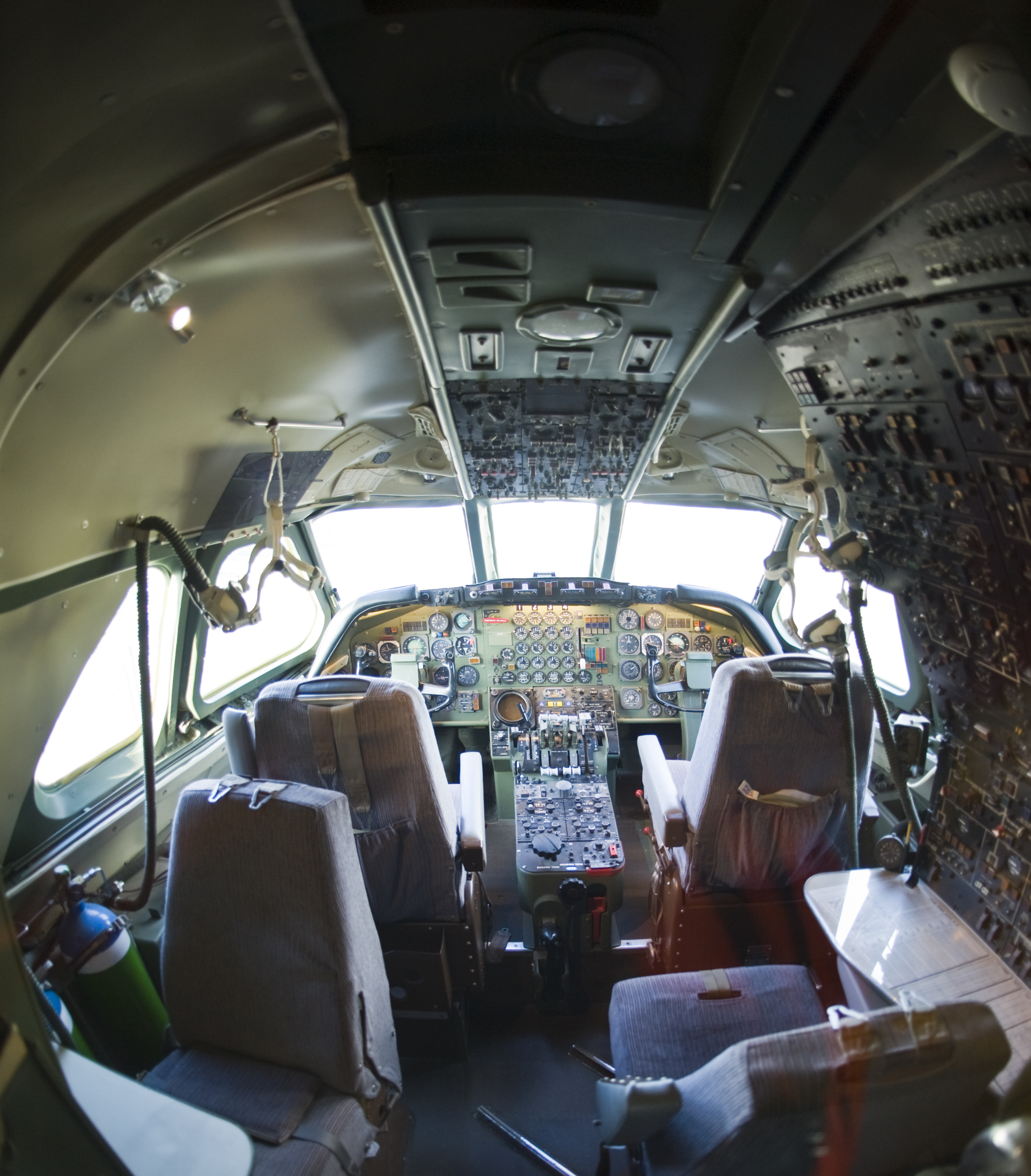
Convair 990 Coronado cockpit

The 990 did not meet the specifications promised, and American Airlines reduced its order as a result. The 990A was developed by adding fairings to the engine nacelles, among other changes. Despite the modifications from the basic 880 and those in response to drag problems in testing, the aircraft never lived up to its promise of coast-to-coast nonstop capability from JFK to LAX. American Airlines' timetables show little or no difference in scheduled time between 707 and 990A flights. AA began to dispose of its 990As in 1967.

During May 1961, one of the pre-production 990 aircraft, while demonstrating the margin between its operating speed and its capability during a dive at .97 Mach from 32,000 ft to 22,500 ft, reached 675 miles per hour (587 kn; 1,086 km/h) at an altitude of 22,000 feet (6.7 km): the fastest true airspeed ever attained by a commercial jet transport at that time. However, in level flight the maximum speed, 0.84 M, was less than that guaranteed to American Airlines, 0.89 M, because the drag levels with the anti-shock bodies were much higher than predicted. A drag reduction program was instituted during which streamlining of the engine pylon/wing interface and addition of nacelle fairings achieved 0.89 M.

In 1963, the 990A was reported to burn 13,750 pounds (6.24 t) per hour of fuel at Mach 0.84 (484 kn; 897 km/h; 557 mph) at 35,000 feet (11 km) at a mass of 200,000 pounds (91 t). In contrast, a modern Boeing 737 MAX 8 typically carries 162 passengers and burns 4,460 lb (2.02 t) per hour at Mach 0.78 (450 kn; 833 km/h; 518 mph) at sub-optimal parameters.

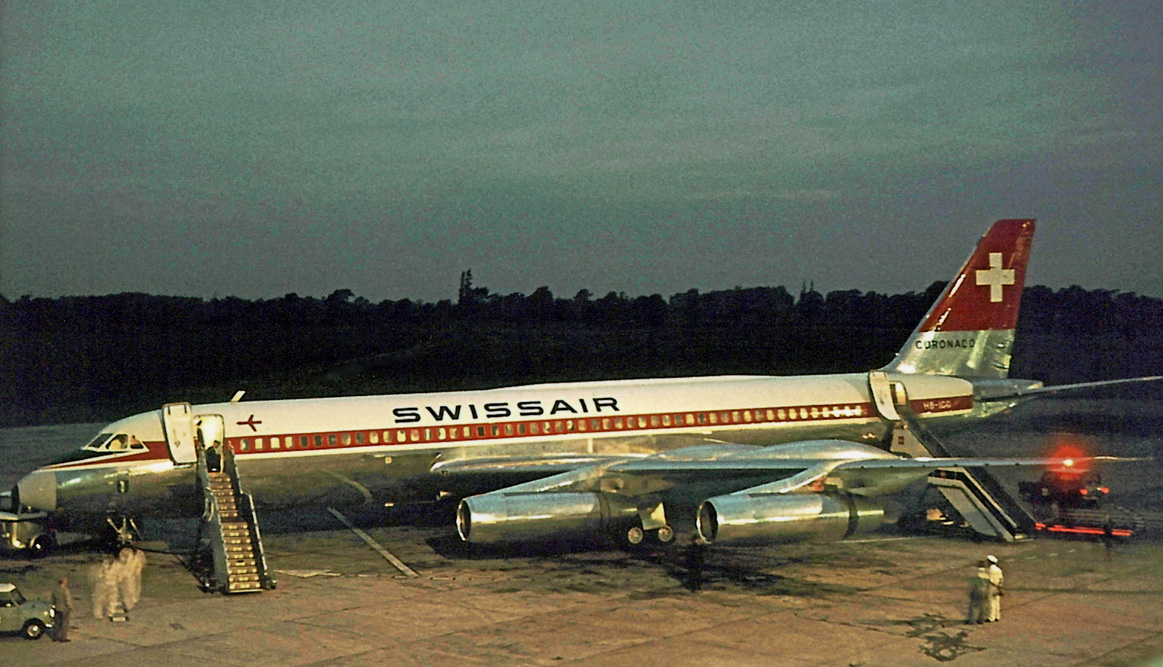
Swissair 990A Coronado "St Gallen" at Manchester Airport in 1964

Swissair bought eight 990As beginning in 1962, operating them on long-distance routes to South America, West Africa, the Middle and Far East, as well as on European routes with heavy traffic. Their fleet was withdrawn from service in 1975. Scandinavian Airlines (SAS) also operated 990A Coronados on their long-haul schedules to Tokyo and other destinations in the Far East and also to South America and Africa.

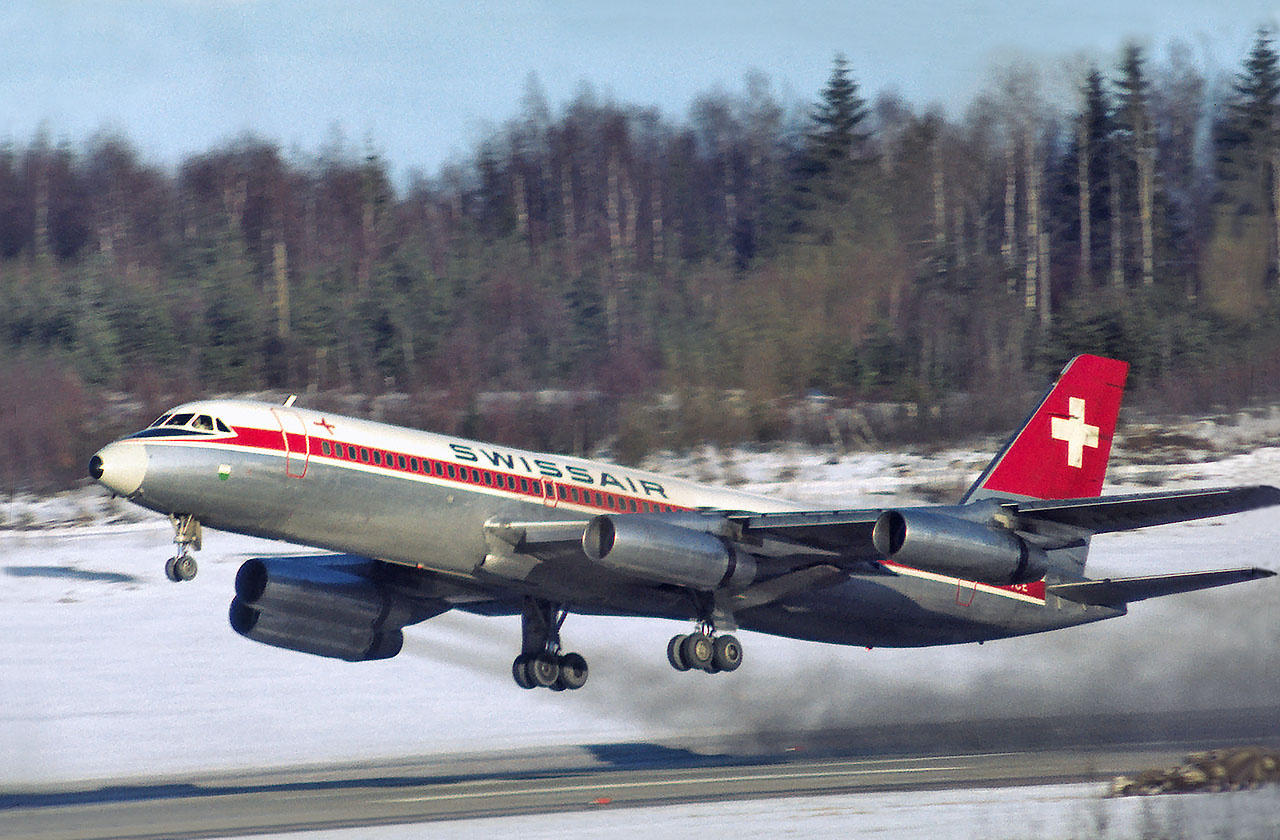
Swissair Convair 990A Coronado taking off from Stockholm - Arlanda Airport, showing the distinctive volumes of smoke produced by its aft-turbofan, GE J79 turbojet-derived GE CJ805 engines

The 990's niche was soon captured by the Boeing 720 and Boeing 720B, derivatives of the Boeing 707, and later by the Boeing 727. By the time the assembly line shut down in 1963, only 37 990s had been produced, bringing General Dynamics' entire production of commercial jet airliners to 102 airframes. The failure of airlines to broadly accept the Convair 880 and 990 led Convair's parent company, General Dynamics, to suffer one of the largest corporate losses in history. As a result, Convair exited the jet airliner business, although it later built fuselages for McDonnell Douglas, specifically for the DC-10, KC-10 and MD-11.

When the major airlines retired their Convair 990s, they found a second life on charter airlines and air travel clubs. Modern Air Transport flew the aircraft into the 1970s. Spantax of Spain had a large fleet until the mid-1980s, as did Ports of Call Travel Club. In 1967, Alaska Airlines purchased Convair 990 PP-VJE from Varig, and operated it as N987AS in scheduled airline service until 1975.

== Variants ==
- 600: Designation used for conception, design and build of first aircraft.
- 990: Initial production version.
- 990A: Higher cruising speed and longer range.

== Operators ==
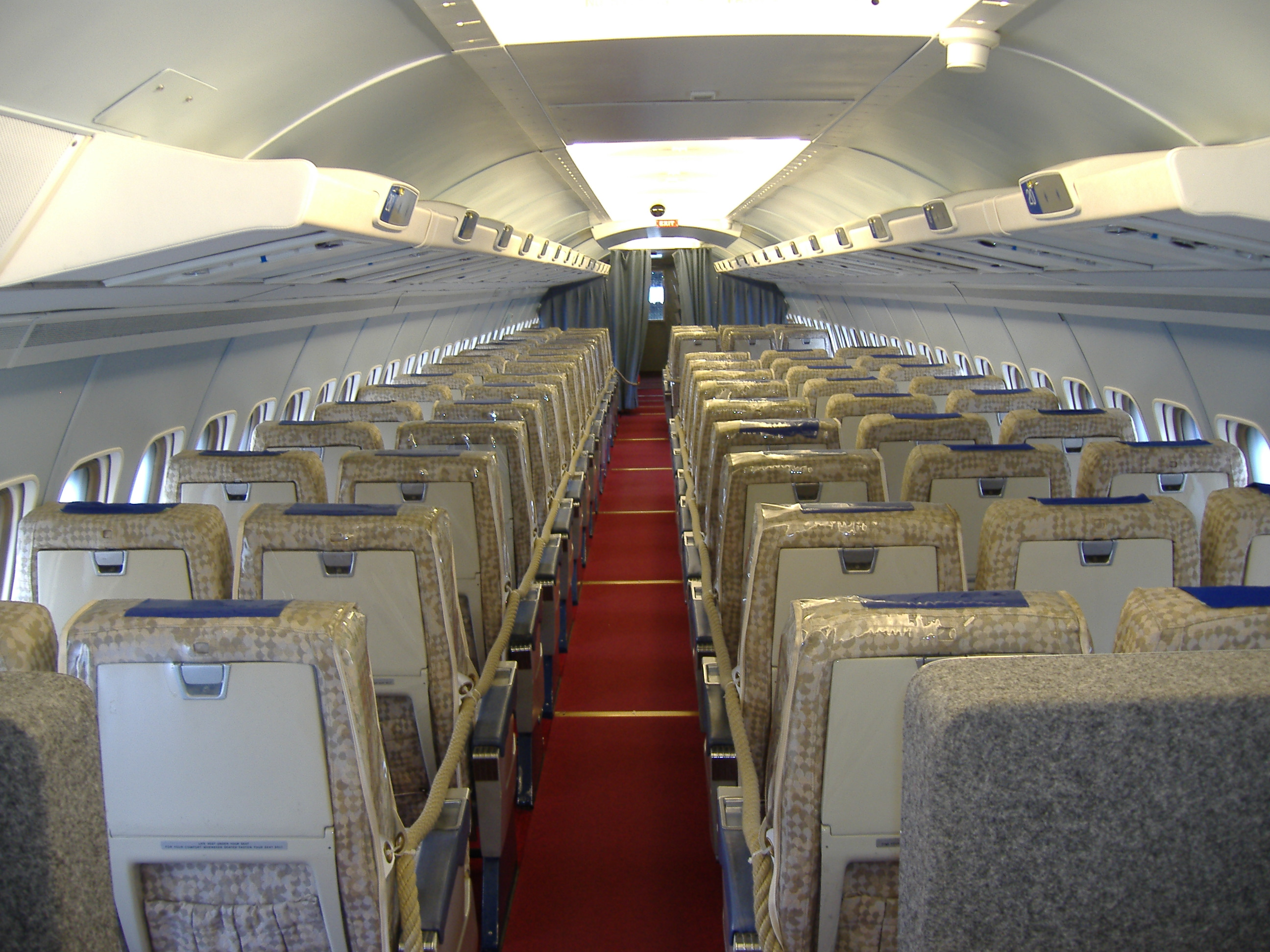
Interior of a Convair 990 operated by Swissair now on public display in the Swiss Museum of Transport, the Verkehrshaus der Schweiz in Luzern

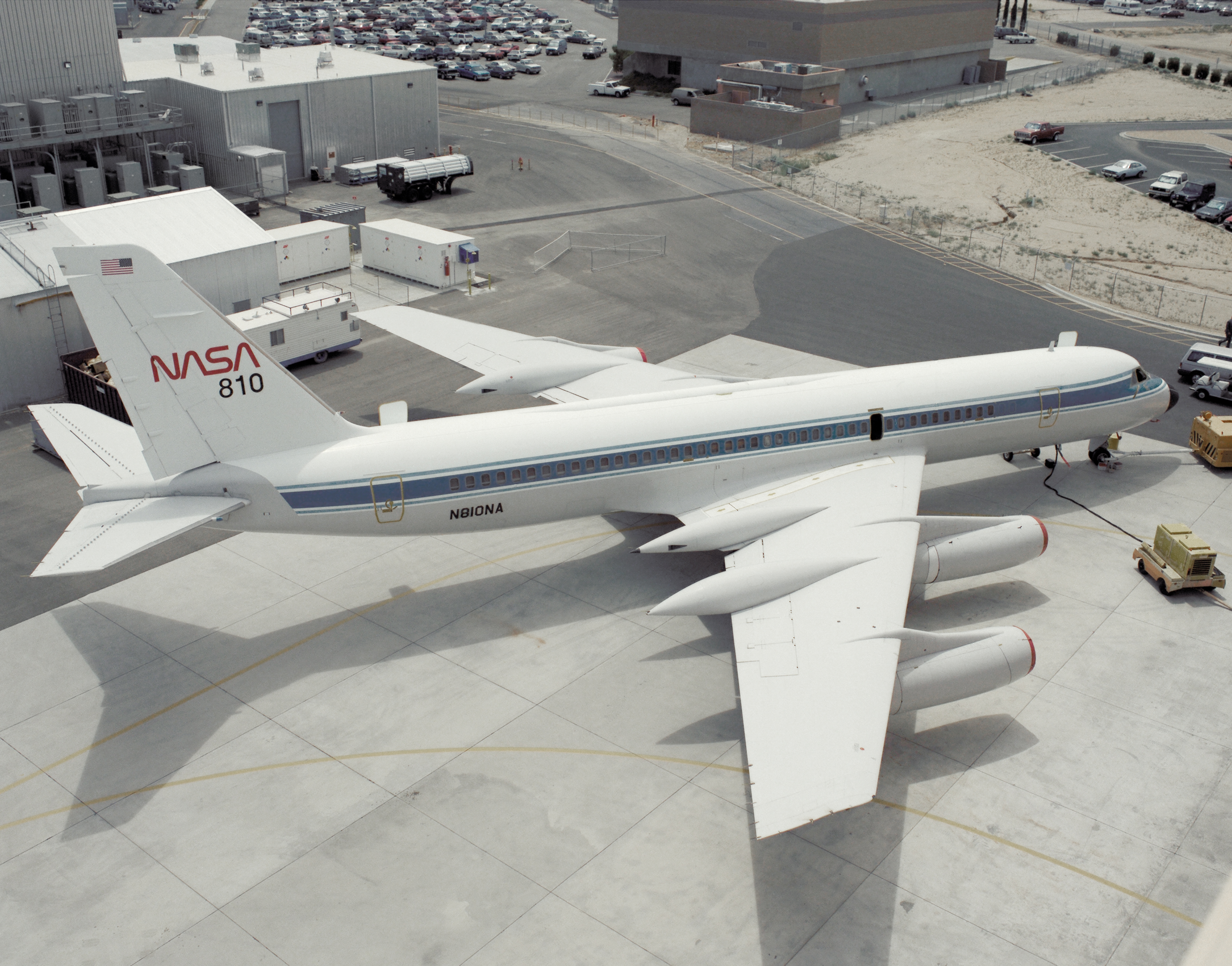
NASA Convair 990. This aircraft has been retired, and is now on display at the entrance to the Mojave Spaceport.

- Aerolíneas Peruanas*
- Air Afrique
- Air Ceylon
- Air France (one aircraft leased in 1967)
- Alaska Airlines
- American Airlines*
- AREA - Aerovias Ecuatorianas
- Balair (leased from Swissair)
- Ciskei International Airways- no revenue flights made
- Christ is the Answer (leased from Galaxy Airlines)- no revenue flights made
- El Al Israel Airlines
- Galaxy Airlines
- Garuda Indonesian Airways*
- Ghana Airways (leased from Swissair)
- Iberia Líneas Aéreas de España (leased from Spantax)
- Internord Aviation
- Lebanese International Airways
- Middle East Airlines
- Modern Air Transport
- NASA
- Nomads
- Nordair
- Northeast Airlines
- Paradise 1000 Travel Club (leased from Modern Air Transport but not operated)
- Ports of Call Travel Club
- Scandinavian Airlines System*
- Spantax
- Swissair*
- Thai Airways International (leased from Scandinavian Airlines System)
- Varig*

*Original operators.

== Accidents and incidents ==
- May 28, 1968: Garuda Indonesian Airways Flight 892 (PK-GJA) crashed after takeoff from Bombay-Santacruz Airport, killing all 29 people on board and one person on the ground.
- January 5, 1970: A Spantax Convair 990 (EC-BNM) crashed at Stockholm-Arlanda Airport outside Stockholm, Sweden while taking off on a three-engine ferry flight to Zurich, Switzerland, killing five of seven passengers; the three crew members survived.
- February 21, 1970: Swissair Flight 330 (HB-ICD) crashed near Würenlingen, Switzerland while trying to return to Zurich Airport after a bomb detonated in the aft cargo compartment, killing all nine crew and 38 passengers.
- August 8, 1970: A Modern Air Transport Convair 990 (N5603) was being ferried from New York to Acapulco when it crashed on approach to Alvarez International Airport, Mexico. No one was killed, but one of the eight crew was badly injured.
- December 3, 1972: A Spantax Convair 990 (EC-BZR) crashed at Los Rodeos Airport in Tenerife while taking off in an almost-zero visibility, killing all seven crew and 148 passengers.
- March 5, 1973: Spantax Flight 400, a Convair 990 (EC-BJC) on a flight from Madrid to London, was involved in a mid-air collision with Iberia Flight 504, a McDonnell Douglas DC-9, over Nantes. The Convair 990 lost part of its left wing, but its pilots managed to land safely at Cognac – Châteaubernard Air Base. The DC-9 crashed, killing all 68 passengers and crew on board.
- April 12, 1973: A NASA Convair 990 (N711NA) collided with a U.S. Navy Lockheed P-3C during the approach to NAS Moffett Field in Sunnyvale, California. Both aircraft crashed on the Sunnyvale Municipal Golf Course, half a mile short of the runway, killing all aboard except for one Navy crewman. (Note: One Navy crewman in the P-3 survived the crash. He was in the P-3's tail section, which broke off the aircraft as the 990 collided from above. He fell out of the broken tail section and survived with massive injuries. People at the golf course who witnessed the crash tried to break open windows on the wreckage with golf clubs, in a futile attempt to pull the injured out before fire consumed the crews.)
- July 17, 1985: A NASA Convair 990 (N712NA) suffered a blown tire during take-off at Riverside-March AFB, California. While attempting to clear the runway, the rim shattered and punctured the right-wing fuel tank forward of the right main gear. All 19 occupants survived, but the subsequent intense fire destroyed the plane, its equipment and documentation.

== Surviving aircraft ==
- 30-10-2 – N990AB – Aircraft in storage since 1980 with Scroggins Aviation at the Mojave Air and Space Port in Mojave, California. This aircraft was formerly operated by Aerolíneas Peruanas.
- 30-10-12A – HB-ICC – Aircraft on display at the Swiss Museum of Transport in Lucerne, Switzerland. This aircraft was formerly operated by Swissair.
- 30-10-18 – EC-BZP – Forward fuselage preserved at Sabadell Airport in Sabadell, Spain for cabin crew training. This aircraft was formerly operated by Spantax.
- 30-10-29 – N810NA – Aircraft on display as a gate guardian at Mojave Air and Space Port in Mojave, California. This aircraft was formerly operated by American Airlines, Modern Air Transport and NASA.
- 30-10-30 – EC-BZO – Aircraft in storage at Palma de Mallorca Airport in Palma, Majorca since 1987. This aircraft was formerly operated by Spantax.

== Specifications (Convair 990A) ==
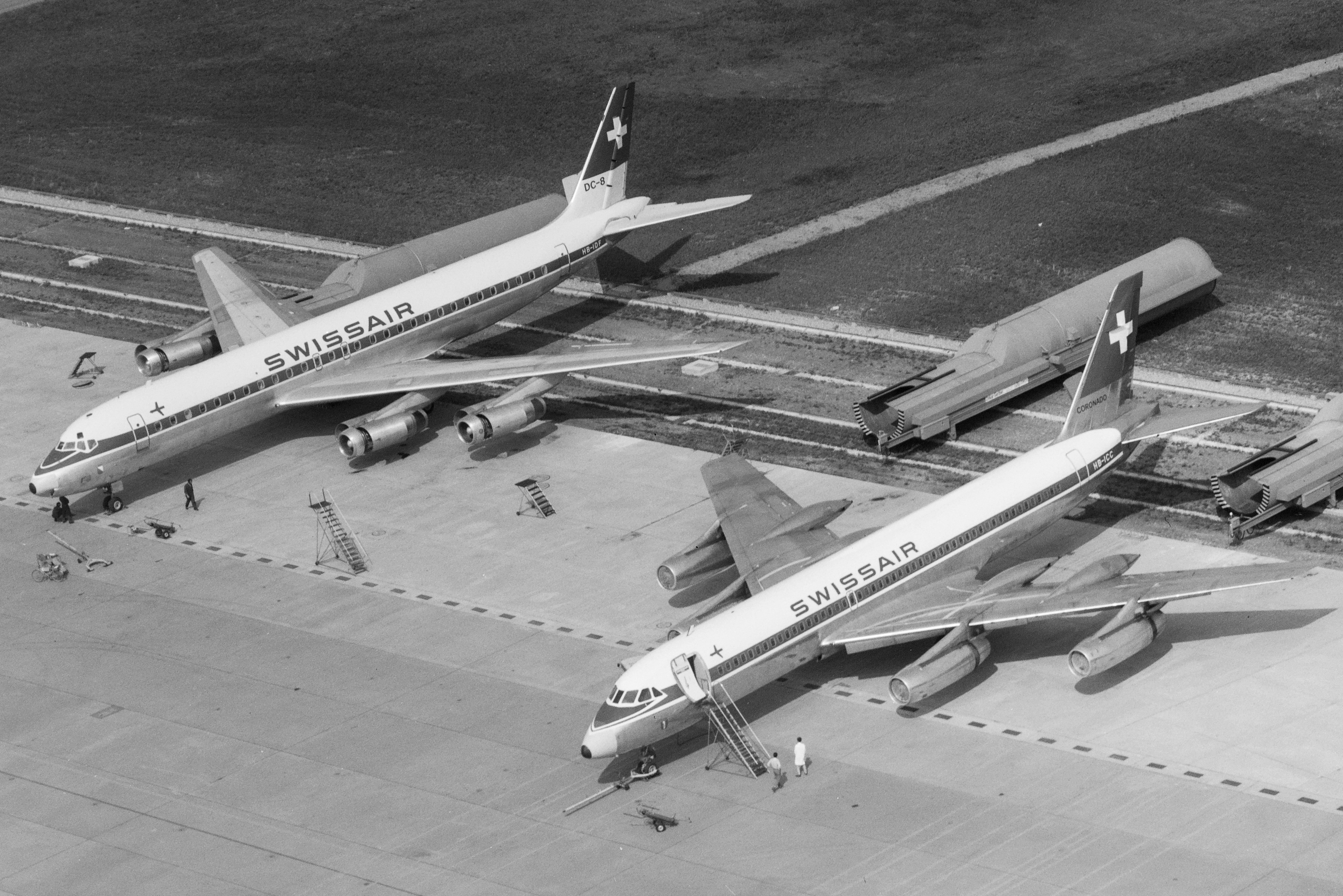
A Douglas DC-8 (left, engine cowlings open) and a competing Convair CV-990 (right, with distinctive anti-shock bodies on wings' trailing edge)

Data from Jane's All the World's Aircraft 1965-66

General characteristics

- Crew: 4 (+ cabin crew)
- Capacity: up to 149 passengers
- Length: 139 ft 9 in (42.60 m)
- Wingspan: 120 ft (37 m)
- Height: 39 ft 6 in (12.04 m)
- Wing area: 2,250 sq ft (209 m^{2})
- Aspect ratio: 6.2
- Empty weight: 133,000 lb (60,328 kg)
- Maximum zero-fuel weight: 160,000 lb (73,000 kg)
- Max takeoff weight: 253,000 lb (114,759 kg)
- Maximum landing weight: 202,000 lb (92,000 kg)
- Powerplant: 4 × General Electric CJ805-23B turbofan engines, 16,050 lbf (71.4 kN) thrust each aft-fan engines

Performance

- Maximum speed: 540 kn (620 mph, 1,000 km/h) at 20,000 ft (6,100 m) at 200,000 lb (91,000 kg) AUW
- Maximum speed: Mach 0.871
- Maximum permissible diving speed: M0.91
- Cruise speed: 484 kn (557 mph, 896 km/h) / M0.84 at 35,000 ft (11,000 m)
- Stall speed: 109 kn (125 mph, 202 km/h) at 170,000 lb (77,000 kg) AUW with wheels and flaps down
- Range: 3,302 nmi (3,800 mi, 6,115 km) with 104,373 lb (47,343 kg) usable fuel, 25,770 lb (11,690 kg) payload and 18,000 lb (8,200 kg) reserve fuel
- Service ceiling: 41,000 ft (12,000 m)
- Wing loading: 112.44 lb/sq ft (549.0 kg/m^{2})
- Take-off run: 9,800 ft (3,000 m) at MTOW (SR-422B Field length)
- Landing run: 5,400 ft (1,600 m) at 170,000 lb (77,000 kg) AUW (SR-422B Field length)

== See also ==
Related development

- Convair 880

Aircraft of comparable role, configuration, and era

- Boeing 720
- Shanghai Y-10

Related lists

- List of jet airliners
- List of civil aircraft
