= Garuda Indonesia Flight 865 =

1996 aviation accident in Japan

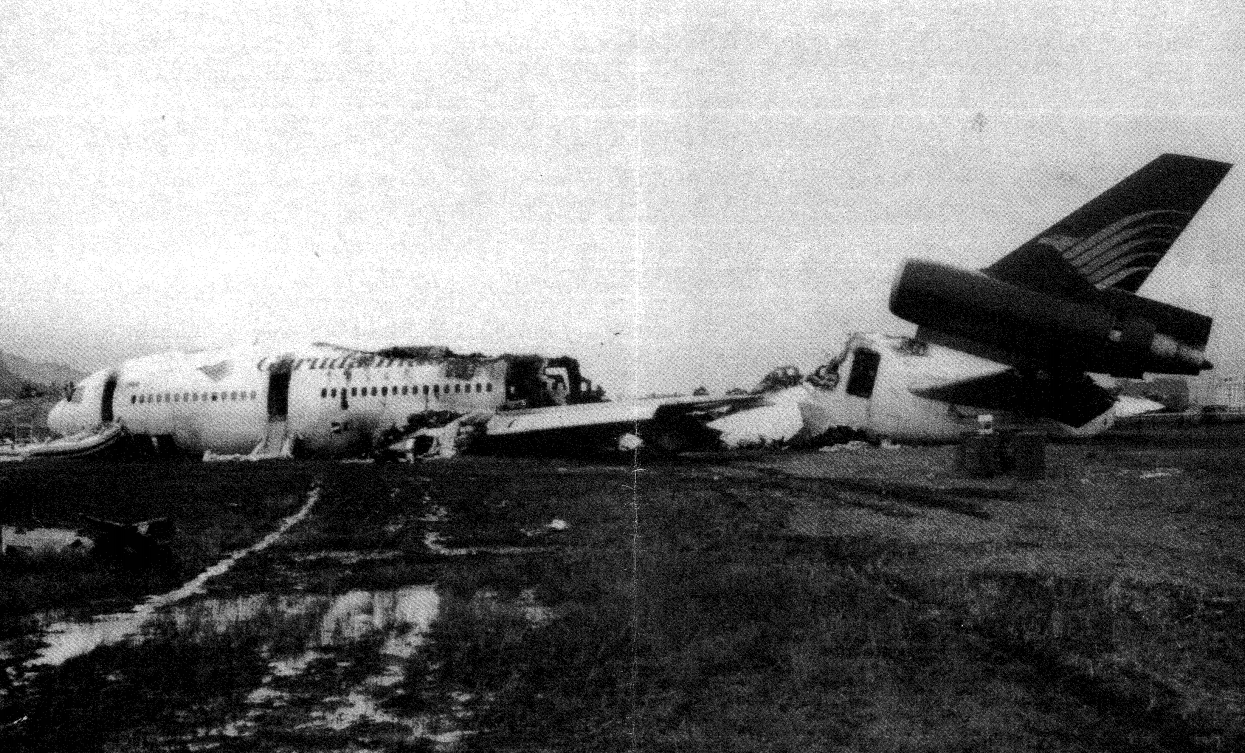
- Wreckage of the aircraft

Accident
- Date: 13 June 1996
- Summary: Runway overrun due to engine failure and pilot error
- Site: Fukuoka Airport, Fukuoka, Japan; 33°34′11″N 130°27′42″E

Aircraft
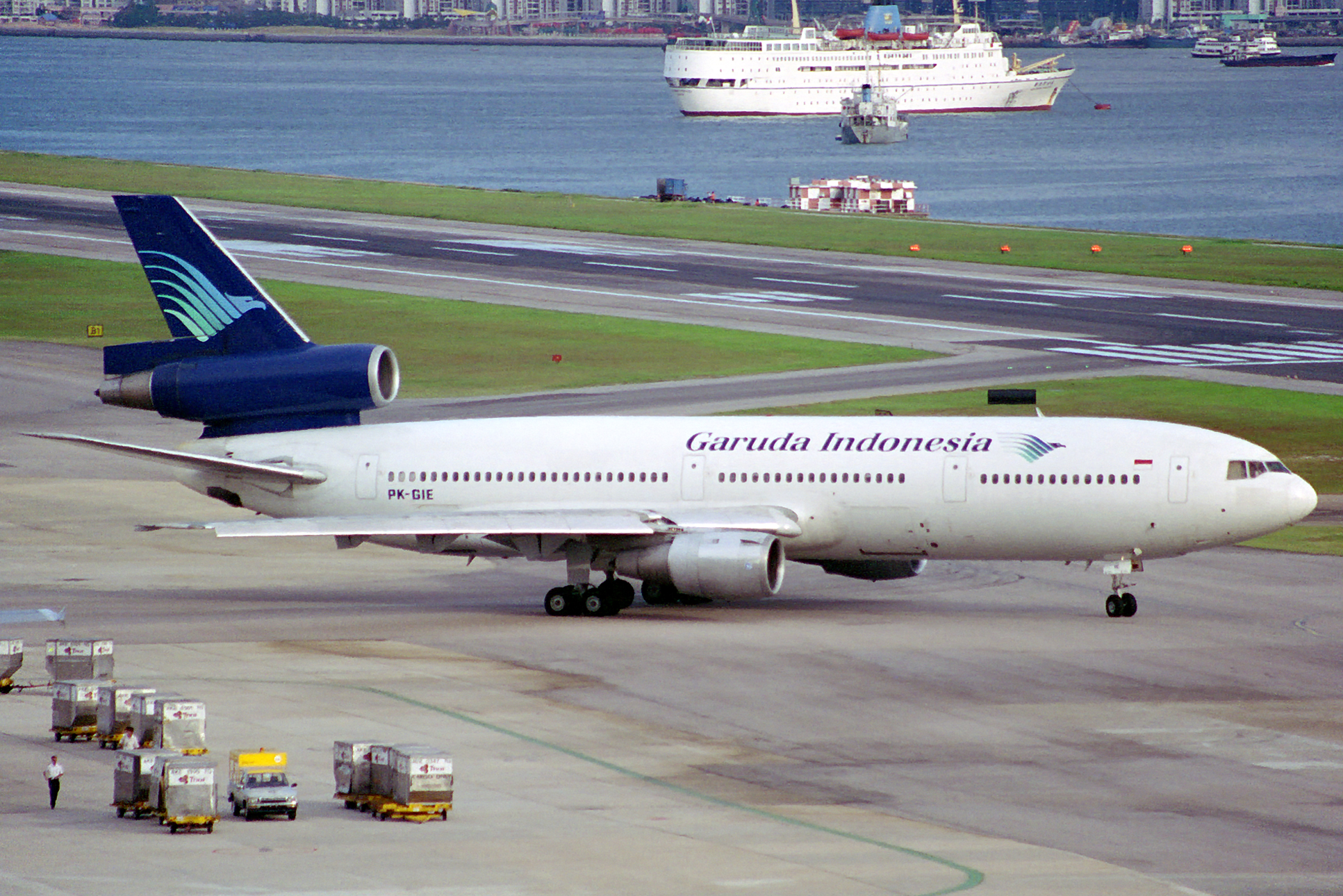
- PK-GIE, the aircraft involved in the accident, pictured in 1993
- Aircraft type: McDonnell Douglas DC-10-30
- Aircraft name: Kalimantan
- Operator: Garuda Indonesia
- IATA flight No.: GA865
- ICAO flight No.: GIA865
- Call sign: INDONESIA 865
- Registration: PK-GIE
- Flight origin: Fukuoka Airport, Fukuoka, Japan
- Stopover: Ngurah Rai International Airport, Denpasar, Bali, Indonesia
- Destination: Soekarno-Hatta International Airport, Jakarta, Indonesia
- Occupants: 275
- Passengers: 260
- Crew: 15
- Fatalities: 3
- Injuries: 170
- Survivors: 272

Seat map of Garuda Indonesia Flight 865 (the passengers in 34K, 35K, and 35J died)

Garuda Indonesia Flight 865 was a scheduled international flight from Fukuoka, Japan, to Jakarta, Indonesia via Bali, Indonesia. On 13 June 1996, Flight 865 crashed on takeoff from runway 16 at Fukuoka Airport. Out of the 275 occupants on board, 3 were killed.

== Accident ==
Flight 865 was cleared for takeoff from Runway 16. Suddenly, the crew of the McDonnell Douglas DC-10-30, Captain Ronald Longdong (38), First Officer Yudhia Putra (31) and Flight Engineer Dwi Prayitno (34), attempted to abort take-off after the failure of the number 3 (right) engine. The abort occurred at speeds nearing V_{2}, and after rotation of the nose. Following the abort, attempts were made to stop the aircraft on the runway by use of brakes, ground spoilers and thrust reversers, but the crew was unable to stop the aircraft within the boundaries of the runway, which exited the airport premises. The captain stated that he feared that the aircraft might hit buildings or objects if he did not abort the takeoff.

In slowing down, the aircraft slid through a ditch, a fence and a road before finally coming to rest approximately 620 metres (2,030 ft) beyond the runway threshold. Damage done to the aircraft during the slide across the ground caused the landing gear to break off and both wing-mounted engines to be torn from the wings. The fuselage broke in two places, at about the wing root trailing edge, and at approximately 10.4 metres (34 ft) aft of the wing root trailing edge. The resultant fire destroyed the areas between the hull fractures, and other areas of the aircraft. The bodies of 3 men were later discovered in the back of the wreckage of the plane. Two of the passengers, in seats 34K and 35K, died as a result of the violent impact; the third fatality, seated in 35J, was rendered unconscious by the impact and was unable to escape the spreading inferno.

The final report concluded that pilot error and the failure of the maintenance and flight operation sections of the airline in properly coordinating matters resulted in the accident.

== Aircraft ==
The aircraft involved was a McDonnell Douglas DC-10-30, registration PK-GIE. It was manufactured in 1979 and its MSN number was 46685/284.The aircraft had three General Electric CF6-50C2 turbofan engines. The cause of the engine failure leading to the crash was that the engine turbine blades had been in service for 6,182 cycles (take-offs and landings) when General Electric recommended discarding the blades after 6,000 cycles.

== See also ==
- Spantax Flight 995
