= 1973 Nantes mid-air collision =

Mid-air collision over France in 1973

1973 Nantes mid-air collision Iberia Flight 504 · Spantax Flight 400
Accident
- Date: 5 March 1973
- Summary: Mid-air collision caused by ATC error
- Site: Nantes, France; 47.0161°N 1.4343°W
- Total fatalities: 68
- Total survivors: 107

First aircraft
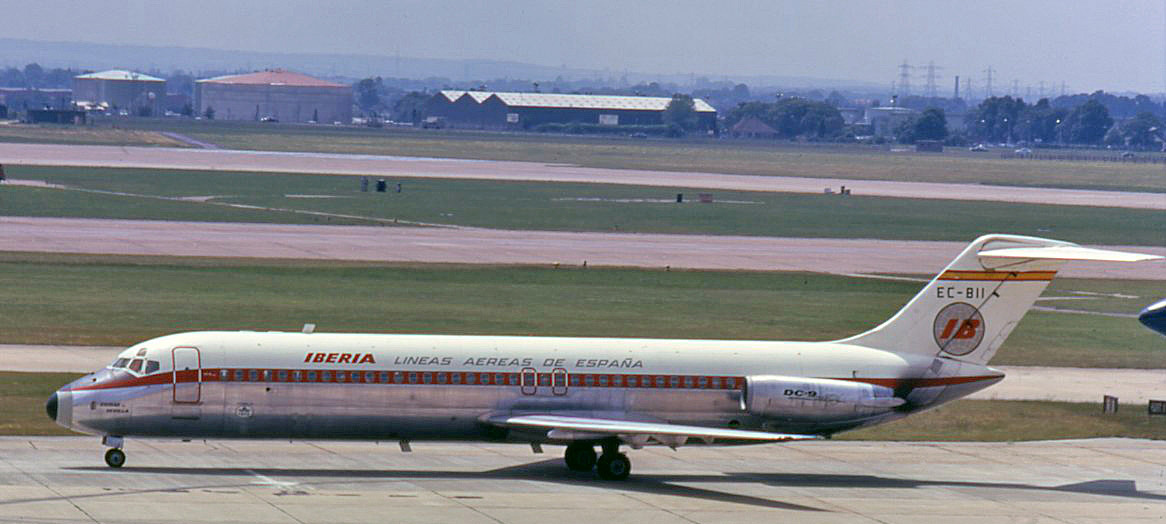
- EC-BII, the Iberia McDonnell Douglas DC-9 involved in the accident, pictured in 1972
- Type: McDonnell Douglas DC-9-32
- Operator: Iberia
- IATA flight No.: IB504
- ICAO flight No.: IBE504
- Call sign: IBERIA 504
- Registration: EC-BII
- Flight origin: Palma de Mallorca Airport
- Destination: London Heathow
- Occupants: 68
- Passengers: 61
- Crew: 7
- Fatalities: 68
- Survivors: 0

Second aircraft
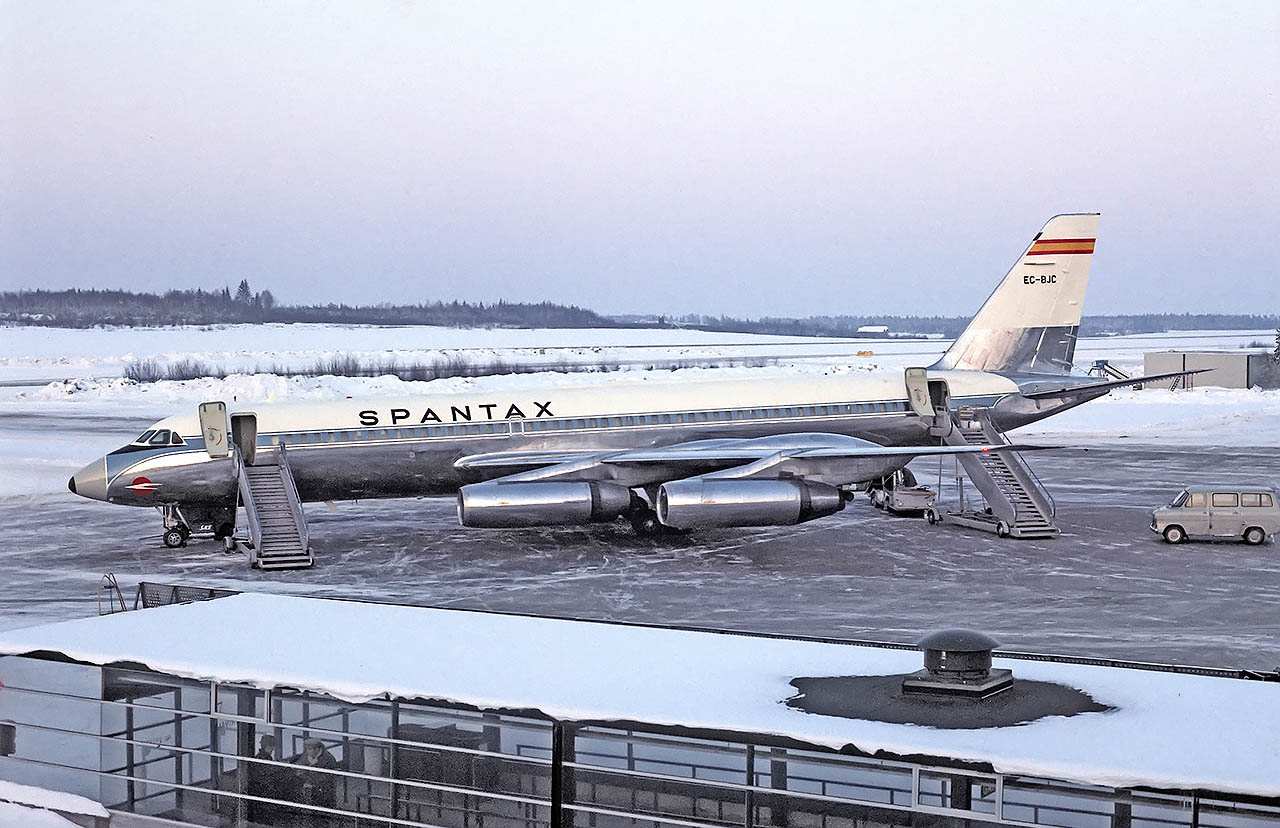
- EC-BJC, the Spantax Convair 990 involved in the accident, pictured in 1969
- Type: Convair 990 Coronado
- Operator: Spantax
- IATA flight No.: BX400
- ICAO flight No.: BXS400
- Call sign: SPANTAX 400
- Registration: EC-BJC
- Flight origin: Madrid-Barajas Airport
- Destination: London Gatwick
- Occupants: 107
- Passengers: 99
- Crew: 8
- Fatalities: 0
- Survivors: 107

The 1973 Nantes mid-air collision occurred when two Spanish airliners travelling to London hit each other over Nantes, France, on 5 March 1973. They were an Iberia McDonnell Douglas DC-9 flying from Palma de Mallorca and a Spantax Convair 990 from Madrid. All 68 people on board the DC-9 were killed. The CV-990 was able to make a successful emergency landing at Cognac – Châteaubernard Air Base.

== Background ==
=== Aircraft ===
The first aircraft involved in the collision, operated by Iberia, was a McDonnell Douglas DC-9-32, registered as EC-BII. It was built by McDonnell Douglas in 1967 and it had logged 10852 hours and 45 minutes of flight time and 9452 takeoff and landing cycles. It was powered by two Pratt & Whitney JT8D-7 engines.

The second aircraft, operated by Spantax, was a Convair 990-30A-5 Coronado, registered as EC-BJC. It was built by Convair in 1962 and it had logged 24775 airframe hours. It had landed 1108 times since its last general overhaul. It was powered by four General Electric CJ805-23 engines.

=== Crews ===
Iberia Flight 504's captain was Luis Cueto Capella, aged 37, who had logged 6612 hours of flight time, 823 of which were on the DC-9. His co-pilot was Octavio Lafita Rueda, aged 35, who had logged 3778 hours of flight time, including 2278 hours on the DC-9. The pilot under training was Víctor José Alcubierre Camacho, aged 29, who had logged 950 hours of flight time, all of which were on the DC-9.

Spantax Flight 400's captain was José Antonio Arenas Rodríguez, aged 39, who had logged 8555 hours and 24 minutes of flight time, including 4861 hours and 5 minutes on the CV-990. His co-pilot was Esteban Saavedra Martínez, also aged 39, who had logged 9501 hours and 47 minutes of flight time, 1790 hours and 16 minutes of which were on the CV-990. The flight engineer was José María González Zaraus Navas, aged 37, who had logged 5093 hours and 31 minutes of flight time.

== Collision ==
Iberia Flight 504, a scheduled service from Palma de Mallorca, and Spantax Flight 400, a charter flight from Madrid, were both traversing France en route to London. They were guided by French military Air Traffic Control as the country's civilian air traffic controllers were on strike. The Iberia DC-9 was due to reach the Nantes VOR point at 12:52 at flight level 290 (29,000 feet [8,839 m]) and the Spantax Convair CV-990 was scheduled to reach it at 13:00 at the same level. Both aircraft had received instructions from Marina sector Air Traffic Control at the French Air Force base in Mont-de-Marsan, who asked them to contact Menhir sector ATC at the French Air Force base in Brest. The Spantax aircraft was on the boundary between the sectors and had difficulty hearing Marina ATC, also receiving no reply to two requests to circle to avoid arriving at the Nantes VOR before 13:00 GMT. The crew decided to start the manoeuvre without ATC authorisation and while in cloud collided with the Iberia DC-9 at 12:52 GMT.

The Iberia DC-9 lost control, exploded, and broke up in mid-air before crashing to the ground. All 61 passengers and seven crew were killed. 37 of the dead were French citizens, 24 were British including Michael Jeffery, the former manager of The Animals and The Jimi Hendrix Experience.

The Spantax CV-990 managed to land at Cognac – Châteaubernard Air Base with damage to its left wing. A survivor, Betty Barrett, later recounted:

My father was sitting in the aisle seat, and I was on the right hand side. And I turned around, and he's very British and very stoic, and I said, "Daddy do you think we are going to make it?". He said, "I rather doubt it darling," and pointed to the other wing.

No-one aboard the Spantax flight was injured, and after repairs the aircraft continued to fly for Spantax until 1979.

After the accident, more than 16 airlines decided to cancel flights over the French air space.

== Report ==
The accident was investigated by French air accident body, the Bureau of Enquiry and Analysis for Civil Aviation Safety (BEA). Its report identified difficulties in communication between the flight crew of the Convair CV-990 and air traffic control as well as procedural errors from both parties. The crew's unilateral decision to turn the aircraft brought it into the path of the DC-9. ATC had assumed a time-based separation of the two aircraft at the same flight level.

== In popular culture ==
The event is briefly mentioned in the MSNBC/The Weather Channel documentary series Why Planes Crash, during the first-season episode "Collision Course". The episode features an interview with survivor Betty Barrett, who shared images of the CV-990's damaged wing after the emergency landing.

== See also ==
- List of civilian mid-air collisions
- 1976 Zagreb mid-air collision
- 2002 Überlingen mid-air collision
- Gol Transportes Aéreos Flight 1907
