= Galaxy Airlines Flight 203 =

1985 aviation accident in Nevada

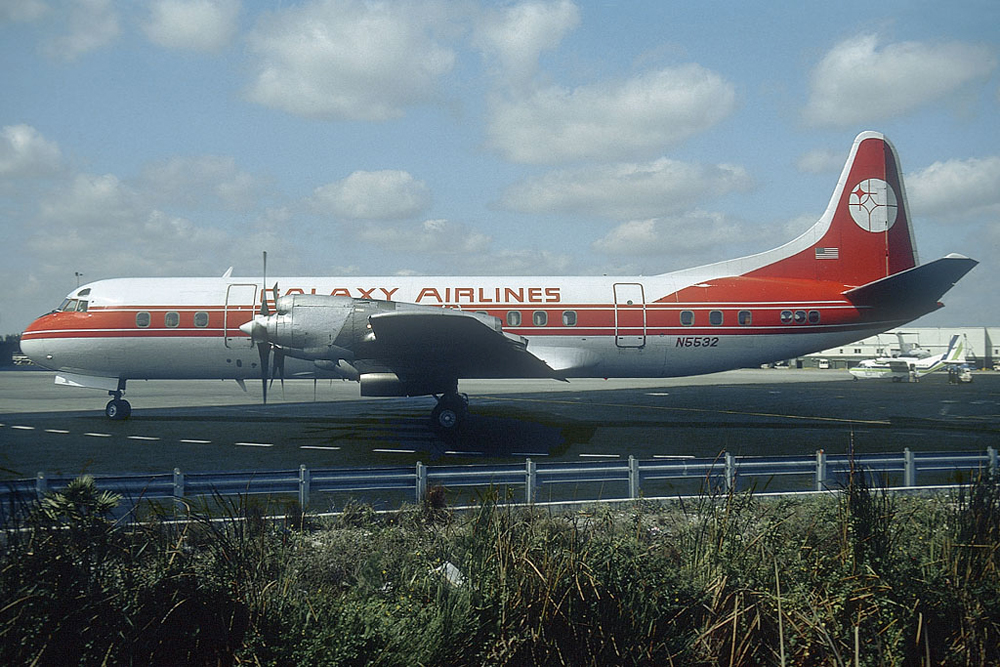
- N5532, the aircraft involved in the accident, seen with a previous livery

Accident
- Date: January 21, 1985
- Summary: Pilot error and ground crew error
- Site: Near Reno–Cannon International Airport, Reno, Nevada, United States; 39°27′55″N 119°46′56″W

Aircraft
- Aircraft type: Lockheed L-188A Electra
- Operator: Galaxy Airlines
- Call sign: GALAXY 203
- Registration: N5532
- Flight origin: Reno–Cannon International Airport, Reno, Nevada
- Destination: Minneapolis–Saint Paul International Airport, Minneapolis, Minnesota
- Occupants: 71
- Passengers: 65
- Crew: 6
- Fatalities: 70
- Injuries: 1
- Survivors: 1

Galaxy Airlines Flight 203 was a non-scheduled charter flight of a Lockheed L-188A Electra from Reno to Minneapolis which crashed shortly after taking off from Reno-Tahoe International Airport on January 21, 1985. All but one of the 71 on board died. It was the first major air disaster in the U.S in 1985 and the deadliest since the crash of Pan Am Flight 759 in 1982.

The National Transportation Safety Board (NTSB) concluded that the crash was mainly caused by pilot error. While taking off from Reno, the aircraft suffered significant vibrations, which happened due to error by the ground crew. The pilots mistakenly thought that the vibrations were caused by a faulty engine and thus tried to recover by reducing the power of all of the aircraft's four engines. This significantly lowered the lift forces, causing the aircraft to stall and crash onto the ground.

== Aircraft ==
The aircraft involved in the crash was a 25-year-old Lockheed L-188A Electra with a manufacturing serial number of 1121. The aircraft was initially delivered to American Airlines in 1960 as N6130A. The aircraft was eventually sold to American Sales Company, which leased the aircraft to Galaxy Airlines in 1983. At the time, the aircraft had been re-registered as N5532.

Reports stated that N5532, the Lockheed L-188A Electra operating Flight 203, had been involved in a serious turbulence incident in 1984. At the time, the aircraft was carrying Democratic Party presidential candidate Jesse Jackson for a flight to Dallas. The severe turbulence prompted FAA officials to investigate the structural integrity of the aircraft. The report stated that no structural damage was found.

== Passengers and crew ==
The aircraft was carrying 65 passengers and six crew members. The passengers were mostly residents of Minnesota, while several others were from nearby Wisconsin and Iowa. They had chartered Galaxy Airlines's Lockheed Electra for their return trip to Minneapolis after spending days on Reno's casino resorts and watching Super Bowl XIX, which was held on the same week as their flight arrival to Nevada.

The crew members, who were based in Florida, consisted of three flight crew members and three cabin crew members. The flight crew were:

- Captain Allan Heasley (49), who was the commander of the flight and the pilot flying. Heasley had been hired by the company as a part-time pilot from 1981 to 1983 before he became a full-time pilot in 1984. Heasley was a veteran pilot and had flown for over 5,000 hours with the P-3 Orion, the military version of the Lockheed L-188 Electra, which he had flown during his service in Vietnam. He was considered a highly experienced pilot, with over 14,000 flying hours. The last flight proficiency check described him as a "very competent" pilot.
- First Officer Kevin Fieldsa (27), was the co-pilot and the pilot non-flying of the flight. He had been hired in 1984 and had accrued a total flight experience of over 5,000 hours, of which 172 were on the type. He was initially noted as being weak in terms of handling flight instruments. He completed his proficiency check for second-in-command in September 1984.
- Flight Engineer Marc Freels (23), who was hired by Galaxy Airlines in 1983. He had accumulated a total flying hours of 262 hours, all of which were on the Electra. His performance was described as "satisfactory".

== Accident ==
=== Flight ===
The aircraft had been chartered by Caesars Tahoe for a three-day gambling and Super Bowl party trip at Caesar's Casino in Lake Tahoe. The group had arrived in Reno on January 18 and some decided to continue their journey to Stanford, California to watch the match between San Francisco 49ers and Miami Dolphins, while the remainder stayed at Lake Tahoe. They eventually regrouped on January 20 for a return flight to Minneapolis.

Prior to the aircraft's arrival in Reno, an Eastern Airlines pilot, who had been following the Electra from behind during its taxi run in Oakland, commented that the crew of the Electra should take a closer look on the aircraft's left engine, which had been emitting smoke and leaking some fluids. The crew acknowledged the message and took the aircraft for a brief check. The inspection found nothing unusual and the ground crew decided to put the aircraft back into service.

Following a three-hour delay in Oakland, the aircraft arrived late in Reno. As the aircraft came to a complete stop, the awaiting passengers were brought onto the apron by vans. While loading the passengers and cargo, the flight engineer came out of the aircraft and took part in the loading, instructing the ground handler to load approximately 67 pieces of luggage to the aft compartment, as the forward cargo had been filled with the crew's belongings and galley stores.

Meanwhile, in the cockpit, the pilots were visibly anxious and tried to rush through the required flight checklists, apparently due to their late arrival in Reno. Several of the checklists were not called out in the correct order, and the pre-departure briefing was abandoned altogether. Captain Heasley, known for being very punctual, was believed to have been angry at the time, since the flight was already three hours late from its assigned time.

After receiving clearance from the ground crew, the pilots started the engines and began the taxi. The aircraft was brought to its take-off configuration and the take-off checklist was read out loud. At 01:01 a.m local time, Flight 203 received their clearance for take-off to Minneapolis.

=== Start of anomaly ===
The Electra accelerated on the runway and was reaching V-1. While First Officer Fieldsa was calling out V-1, a loud thunk simultaneously rattled the entire aircraft. The crew continued the take-off and the aircraft eventually reached V-2 when another loud thunk was heard. As the aircraft wheels lifted off the runway, another thunk was heard. Confused on what caused the sound, Captain Heasley asked Flight Engineer Freels, who simply stated that he did not know either.

01:03:19	First Officer Fieldsa	Vee-one.
01:03:21	Commentary	Sound of loud thunk
01:03:23	First Officer Fieldsa	Vee-two.
01:03:23	Commentary	Sound of loud thunk
01:03:26	First Officer Fieldsa	Gear up.
01:03:27	Captain Heasley	Gear up.
01:03:29	Captain Heasley	What is it, Mark?
01:03:29	Commentary	Sound of loud thunk
01:03:30	Flight Engineer Freels	I don't know, Al. I don't know.
01:03:30	ATC	Ops four at your discretion cross

Moments after its wheel had lifted off the runway, the aircraft began to vibrate heavily, startling the flight crew. Uneasy with the situation, Captain Heasley asked First Officer Fieldsa to inform the ATC about Flight 203's intention to return to Reno due to heavy vibrations. The request was approved and the crew was expected to make a left downwind turn towards Reno. After the banter, the ATC shifted their attention to another flight.

01:03:54	First Officer Fieldsa	Ah, Sir. We'd like to make a left downwind.
01:03:55	Captain Heasley	Tell 'em we have heavy vibrations.
01:03:58	First Officer Fieldsa	We've gotta heavy vibrations in the aircraft.
01:03:58	Flight Engineer Freels	Jesus!
01:03:58	Unknown	(Okay) (I've got it) (Pull the power)
01:04:00	ATC	Galaxy two oh three roger ah maintain VFR and a left downwind for one six right and do you need the equipment?
01:04:05	Commentary	Sound similar to stall buffet and loose cockpit equipment begins to rattle
01:04:07	Captain Heasley	Yeah
01:04:08	First Officer Fieldsa	That's affirmative

Inside the cabin, passengers noticed the thumping sounds from the right side of the aircraft. The ATC noticed that the aircraft had only reached 250 ft before the flight crew decided to return to the airport. The Electra began to turn towards the right and the shaking continued.

The aircraft had stopped climbing and began to descend.

=== Crash ===
Seconds after feeling the vibrations, the pilots pulled back the engine power, causing the airspeed to decrease. The shaking, however, continued. They attempted to return to Reno but they kept losing airspeed and altitude. The aircraft began to descend in a nose-high attitude. As the descent rate increased, the pilots elected to add power to the engines again. With the aircraft nearing the ground, the ground proximity warning system activated.

External videos
- ATC recording
- ATC recording of Flight 203 on YouTube

01:04:11	Unknown	Okay, put more power back!
01:04:14	First Officer Fieldsa	Sixty eight and we got full fuel.
01:04:14	Commentary	Whoop whoop pull up
	Flight Engineer Freels	Pull up
	Commentary	Whoop whoop pull up
	Flight Engineer Freels	Pull up!
01:04:17	ATC	Sixty eight people and twelve hundred pounds of fuel?
01:04:18	First Officer Fieldsa	A hundred knots!
01:04:19	Flight Engineer Freels	God, god!

As the aircraft continued to lose altitude, a crew member turned on the PA system, announcing "We are going to crash". Panic set in and passengers began to scream. Meanwhile, the pilots tried to arrest the descend by increasing the engine's thrust, but the aircraft kept descending.

01:04:21	First Officer Fieldsa	A hundred knots!
01:04:24	Captain Heasley	Max power
01:04:25	Flight Engineer Freels	Max power!
01:04:30	Commentary	Sound of impact
01:04:31	End of recording

At 01:04 local time, with a speed of 105 knots and nose-high condition, the aircraft crashed onto Reno Field just short of the city's South Virginia Street, approximately 1.5 mi (2.4 km) from the end of the runway. The front part was obliterated by the impact, the central portion broke up and ruptured the main fuel tanks, igniting the 2,300 gallons of fuels and causing the airframe to burst into flames. The wreckage slid and struck a furniture store and several parked RVs, worsening the fire and causing multiple explosions.

== Response ==
Emergency services were immediately deployed to the crash site. The Washoe County fire department was notified that a large aircraft had crashed on the outskirts of Reno. The information was relayed to other fire departments and all off-duty officers were called to assist the rescue efforts. A few minutes after the crash, personnel from Reno Fire Department arrived at the site.

Due to the 2,300 gallons (ca. 9 m³) of fuel on board, fires engulfed the crash site and the area nearby. The furniture store was obliterated, while continuous explosions could be heard from exploding gas tanks of the destroyed RVs. While dousing the flames and combing the area, rescuers found three survivors. A fireman found a teenage passenger who had been thrown clear out of the burning aircraft. During the crash, the airframe broke up in front of his seat row. He had managed to put on a brace position, ripped off his seatbelt, and tried to run away from the wreckage before losing consciousness. His father, who was seated next to him, was found to have survived as well with burn injuries. Another survivor could be seen running completely in flames. Authorities stated that the third survivor had around 80-90% burns on his body. The fires were contained 30 minutes after the crash, and no survivors could be found afterwards.

The survivors were identified as George Lamson Sr., 41; his son George Lamson Jr., 17; and Robert Miggins, 45. George Lamson Sr. was initially expected to recover and was planned to be discharged in good condition, but on January 29 he was pronounced dead due to massive head injuries. The third survivor, Robert Miggins, died due to the severity of his burns on February 4, leaving George Lamson, Jr. as the only survivor of the crash.

Reports eventually stated that there were likely more people who had survived the crash but died due to smoke inhalation and fire. A significant portion of the back of the aircraft had stayed intact from the impact and at least 20 people from that part had initially survived, but the crash had caused deformations on the doors and the fires at the front portion had caused the survivors to be trapped.

The crash highlighted the safety of the Lockheed Electra, as this was the second crash of said type in less than a month. This was worsened by reports that the aircraft involved in the crash had suffered severe turbulence a year before the crash, which also had caused the FAA to investigate the incident. The scrutiny that followed prompted Galaxy Airlines to temporarily suspend the operation of their remaining Electras. The Federal Aviation Administration (FAA) provided support for the inspections of their aircraft. The result indicated that the remaining Electra aircraft were in satisfactory condition. Hearing rumors about the safety of their aircraft, Lockheed defended the Electra and stated that its safety record was comparable to any other aircraft in-service at the time.

On January 26, a memorial service for the victims of the crash was held in Minneapolis. The event was attended by 400 people at the Minneapolis Central Lutheran Church. On that same day, the first eight identified victims were planned to be repatriated to Minneapolis through a dedicated United Airlines flight. Authorities stated that all 68 bodies that had been recovered from the crash site had been successfully identified.

In response to the crash, the FAA conducted a reevaluation of its inspection program. A separate review was conducted by the National Transportation Safety Board (NTSB) on whether the procedures and practices that had been applied by the FAA were adequate, or whether they needed further refinements.

A member of the Nevada Congress and Chairman of the House Aviation Subcommittee, Rep. Norman Mineta, criticized the FAA for allegedly failing to detect significant safety problems within the aviation industry, claiming that a member of the FAA stated that they did not know whether their staffing was adequate, an allegation which was denied by FAA. Mineta later called for a probe for the FAA's oversight program. Nevada Congressman, Harry Reid, called for an investigation into the adequacy of airline safety inspection and regulation in the country, later promised that hearings would be held by the summer of 1985. Then governor of Nevada, Richard Bryan, called for a congressional probe immediately after the crash.

== Investigation ==
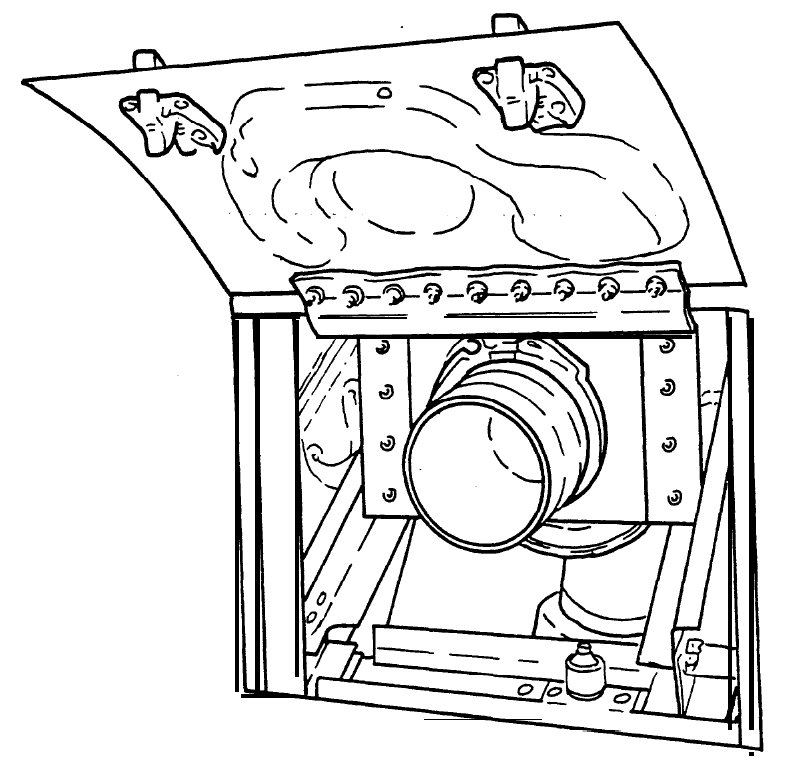
Air start door sketch (from NTSB report)

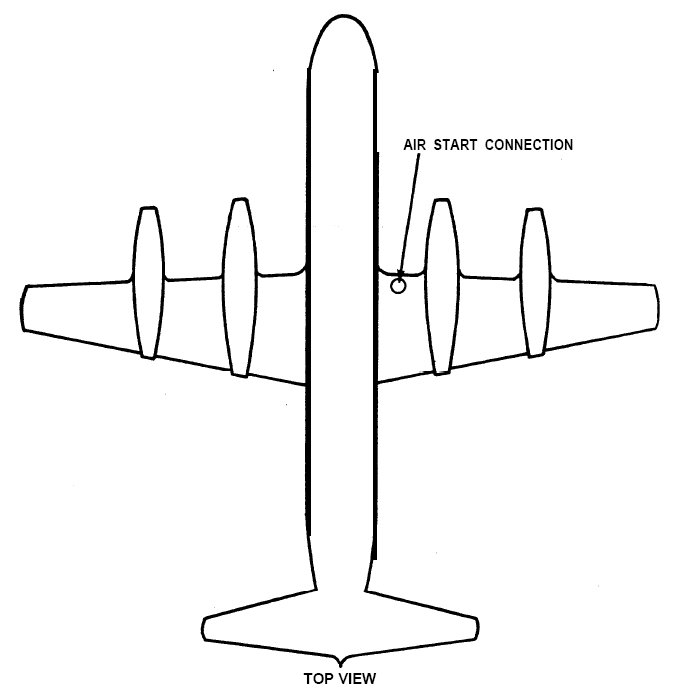
Air start door location (from NTSB report)

=== Cause of vibration ===
The National Transportation Safety Board determined that the vibration was caused by an air starter access door that had been accidentally left open prior to takeoff. The opened door, which was located on the right wing of the Lockheed Electra, was not closed by the ground crew due to a communication mishap. When a supervisor realized that the headset used for communication with the flight crew was not working, he switched to using hand signals mid-routine. In the confusion, the supervisor signaled the flight to taxi before the air start hose had been disconnected. After the supervisor realized his error and signaled the flight crew to make an emergency stop, the hose was successfully disconnected, but the air start access door was not latched back. The supervisor thought that the aircraft was in the clear and that the door had already been closed properly, though he admitted that he was unsure.

The opened hatch produced loud thumping sounds during take-off as the hatch had repeatedly slammed onto the wings. Disturbed airflow affected the tailplane, amplifying the buffeting and eventually caused the aircraft to shake and the pitch and roll control became disrupted. It generated a vibration of around 6 – 9 Hz, strong enough to be caught on the CVR and ATC recording.

=== Pilot error ===
An interview conducted on fellow Electra pilots revealed that they had experienced similar problems while flying with the Electra. During takeoff, several pilots reported significant shakings that felt similar to an impending stall. Some pilots decided to initiate the stall recovery procedure, which successfully ceased the vibrations. These incidents were actually caused by the same single-point source: an accidentally opened air-start access door on the wings.

The investigation concluded that the issues would have been resolved had the crew added more thrusts to the engines. However, on that day the crew did the opposite by reducing power to the engines, causing the aircraft to rapidly lose its lift and stall. The crew was unable to identify the cause of the vibrations. As the aircraft was not equipped with a stall alarm, the crew initially didn't realize that the aircraft was about to enter a stall, opting to lower the thrust to investigate the source of the vibrations instead. This decision led to the aircraft entering a dangerous stall condition.

With the Electra, when the airspeed began reaching the stall speed, the aircraft would have vibrated violently. In Flight 203, the flight crews' decision to lower the airspeed indicated that they had not realized that the aircraft was flying at low airspeed and instead thought that the vibrations were caused by structural or technical issues, probably basing their thoughts on the continuous thumps that had been heard during the take-off roll.

The condition should have been noticed by the flight crew, but the flight recorders indicated that none were aware of the situation until they had entered a stall. During the flight, Captain Heasley was the one who was actively taking charge, while both First Officer Fieldsa and Flight Engineer Freels were noted to be passive and took no initiative. When the aircraft entered a stall, First Officer Fieldsa was busy with radio communications, leaving Captain Heasley overwhelmed with the emergency at hand. Heasley was already under stress due to the late arrival of the flight, and the occurrence of an emergency right after take-off greatly affected his performance.

=== Oversight failure ===
The inquiry also found that the crew had a habit of disregarding established protocols. The standard procedure would have obliged the crew to keep the aircraft in climb until it reached a safe altitude to sort out the problems by reducing the thrust. Once the source was established, power should be restored immediately. The recording and examination on the flight's operation revealed that the crew of the flight also had not filled the weight and balance sheet, nor did they calculate the center of gravity of the aircraft. The flight checklists, including the start and taxi checklists, were conducted hastily, probably due to the flight crew being behind schedule.

Galaxy Airlines were further noted as being deficient in terms of providing the adequate training for pilots, particularly regarding CRM training. The investigation revealed that there was no cockpit resource management (CRM) training for the crew, as the airlines was not required to do so. As such, Captain Heasley could not delegate his tasks to his crewmates. The breakdown of communication and tasks delegation between the flight crews significantly contributed to the crash of Flight 203. The crew were also not trained for full stall or approach to stall condition, further explaining their inability to recognize the stall during the flight.

The probe also highlighted the issue of the accidental opening of the Electra's air starter access door, which was found to be prevalent issue before the crash. One operator even went as far as to modify the door themselves for its entire Electra fleet due to the perceived danger. The FAA claimed that they had no knowledge on the modifications, and Lockheed claimed that they did not know that an accidentally opened air starter access door could cause vibrations since there were no records about such incidents. As both the FAA and Lockheed did not know about the danger, no directives had been issued for air operators.

NTSB stated that during the early operation of the Electra in the 1970s, there were no reporting systems for the pilots to use whenever they experienced serious incidents during flight, since doing so would cause significant repercussions from their management. A reporting system was established in 1976, but it was still ineffective as the system couldn't specify the aircraft type. Safety oversight failed to detect such issues and disseminate the necessary directives to operators of the Electra.

Since the issues were not brought to light, Galaxy Airlines, as a fairly new operator of the Electra, was not aware of the possible accidental opening of the air starter access door, and the pilots did not know that it was a known hazard.

=== Conclusion ===
The National Transportation Safety Board concluded the probable cause of the accident:

the captain's failure to control and the copilot's failure to monitor the flight path and airspeed of the aircraft. This breakdown in crew coordination followed the onset of unexpected vibration shortly after takeoff ... Contributing to the accident was the failure of ground handlers to properly close an air start access door, which led to the vibration.

The report concluded that the open access door caused vibrations which distracted the pilots, though they would likely not have prevented the aircraft from reaching cruise speed and altitude – there had been reports from other Electra pilots that the vibrations ceased at higher air speeds. The pilots reduced power to all four engines simultaneously, presumably to see whether they were the source of the vibrations, and did not restore power quickly enough to prevent a stall.

== Aftermath ==
A few months after the crash, in May 1985, Lockheed issued a letter to warn operators about the possibility of an accidental opening of the Electra's air start access door. The FAA issued an Airworthiness Directive (AD) on the mandatory modifications of the air start access door for all existing Lockheed Electras in operation, and operators would be obliged to have inspectors checking on the Electras that were under operation and to include training on handling such situations.

Questions were eventually raised following reports that the owner of Galaxy Airlines had faced serious financial problems prior to the acquisition of the airline. FAA officials initially downplayed the concerns, claiming that there was no link between the crash and the economic distress that the owner had been facing. However, in April 1986, the United States Transportation Department started an investigation on whether the airline should be grounded based on the owner's past financial woes, citing his questionable divestments with other operators prior to acquiring Galaxy Airlines, though officials stated that the investigation was not related to the crash.

In March 1986, the United States Military Airlift Command announced that they had suspended Galaxy Airlines from providing charter services to any military bases in the continental United States, following the grounding of one of its cargo flights by the FAA. The measures were conducted in response to orders for tighter scrutiny on air operators in the aftermath of the crash of Arrow Air Flight 1285R, which happened in late 1985. Later in June, the United States Air Force, which had engaged Galaxy Airlines with a $5.9 million contract for military charter services, announced that they had decided to terminate their deal following a military inspection that noted multiple deficiencies with the airline's maintenance and operations. The airline ceased all operations that same year.

A memorial called Galaxy Grove was dedicated at Rancho San Rafael Regional Park in 1986. After the plaque was stolen in 2013, a two-ton granite replacement was installed.

== See also ==
- List of aviation accidents and incidents with a sole survivor
- Tropical Airways Flight 1301, stalled following an accidentally opened cargo door during take-off
