= PFAA =

PFAA may refer to:

- Perfluoroalkyl acids
- Professional Flight Attendants Association
- Professional Fitness Athletes' Association
