= Northwest Airlines =

Airline of the United States (1926–2010)

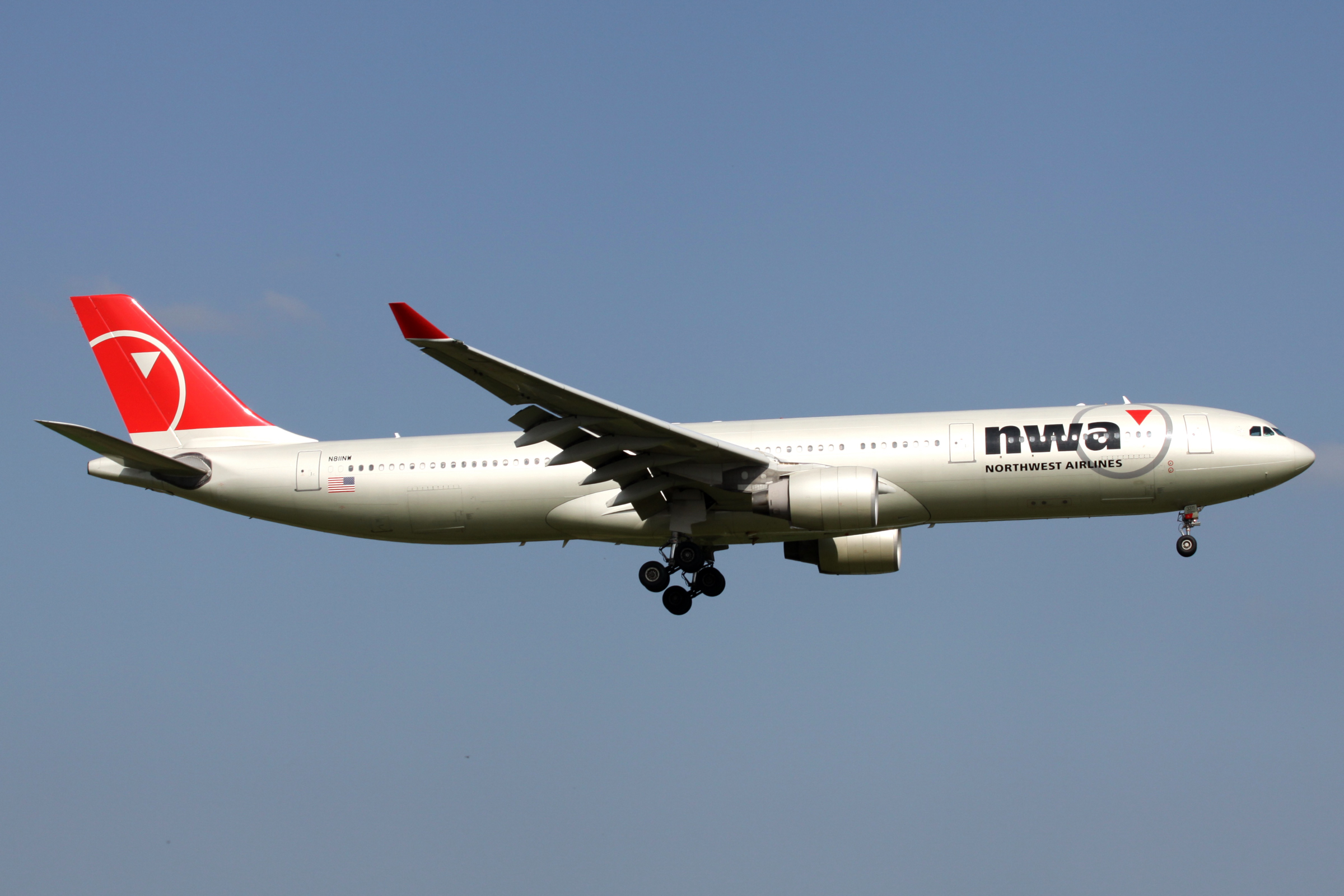
- Northwest Airlines Airbus A330
IATA	ICAO	Call sign
NW	NWA	NORTHWEST
- Founded: September 1, 1926 (as Northwest Airways)
- Commenced operations: October 1, 1926
- Ceased operations: January 31, 2010 (merged into Delta Air Lines)
- Hubs: Amsterdam (1993–2010); Detroit (1986–2010); Memphis (1986–2010); Milwaukee (1988–1992); Minneapolis/St. Paul (1926–2010); Tokyo–Haneda (1947–1978); Tokyo–Narita (1978–2010); Washington–National (1991–1992)
- Focus cities: Indianapolis; Seattle/Tacoma
- Frequent-flyer program: Free Flight Plan (1981–1986); WorldPerks (1986–2009)
- Alliance: SkyTeam (2004–2010)
- Subsidiaries: Northwest Airlink (1984–2009); Northwest Jet Airlink (1997–2003)
- Headquarters: Eagan, Minnesota, United States
- Founder: Lewis Brittin
- Website: nwa.com

Northwest Airlines (often abbreviated as NWA) was a trunk carrier and a major airline in the United States that operated from 1926 until it merged with Delta Air Lines in 2010. The merger made Delta the largest airline in the world until the American Airlines–US Airways merger in 2013.

Northwest was headquartered in Eagan, Minnesota, near Minneapolis–Saint Paul International Airport. After World War II, it became dominant in the trans-Pacific market with a hub in Tokyo, Japan (initially Haneda Airport, later Narita International Airport). In response to United Airlines' 1985 acquisition of Pan Am's Pacific routes, Northwest paid $884 million to purchase Republic Airlines and then established fortress hubs at Detroit Metropolitan Wayne County Airport and Memphis International Airport. With this merger, NWA established the domestic network necessary to feed its well-established Pacific routes. Lacking a significant presence in Europe, in 1993, it began a strategic alliance with KLM and a jointly coordinated European hub at Amsterdam Airport Schiphol.

Before its merger with Delta, Northwest was the world's sixth-largest airline in domestic and international scheduled passenger miles flown and the US's sixth-largest airline in domestic passenger miles flown. In addition to operating one of the largest domestic route networks in the U.S., Northwest carried more passengers across the Pacific Ocean (5.1 million in 2004) than any other U.S. carrier, and carried more domestic air cargo than any other American passenger airline.

Regional and commuter airline flights for Northwest were operated under the name Northwest Airlink by Big Sky Airlines, Eugene Aviation Services, Express Airlines I/II, Fischer Brothers Aviation, Mesaba Airlines, Northeast Express Regional Airlines, Pacific Island Aviation, Pinnacle Airlines, Precision Airlines, Simmons Airlines and Compass Airlines via respective code sharing agreements. Northwest Airlines was also a minority owner of Midwest Airlines, holding a 40% stake in the company.

== History ==
=== Beginnings ===
Northwest Airlines was founded on September 1, 1926, by Colonel Lewis Brittin, under the name Northwest Airways, a reference to the historical name for the Midwestern United States that derived from the Northwest Territory. Like other early airlines, Northwest's focus was not in hauling passengers, but in flying mail for the U.S. Post Office Department. The airline was originally based in Detroit, Michigan. The fledgling airline established a mail route between Minneapolis and Chicago, using open-cockpit biplanes such as the Curtiss Oriole and the Waco JYM. From 1928 the enclosed cabin six-passenger Hamilton H-45 and H-47 were used.

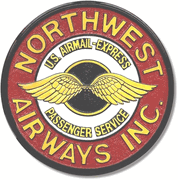
1920s roundel logo

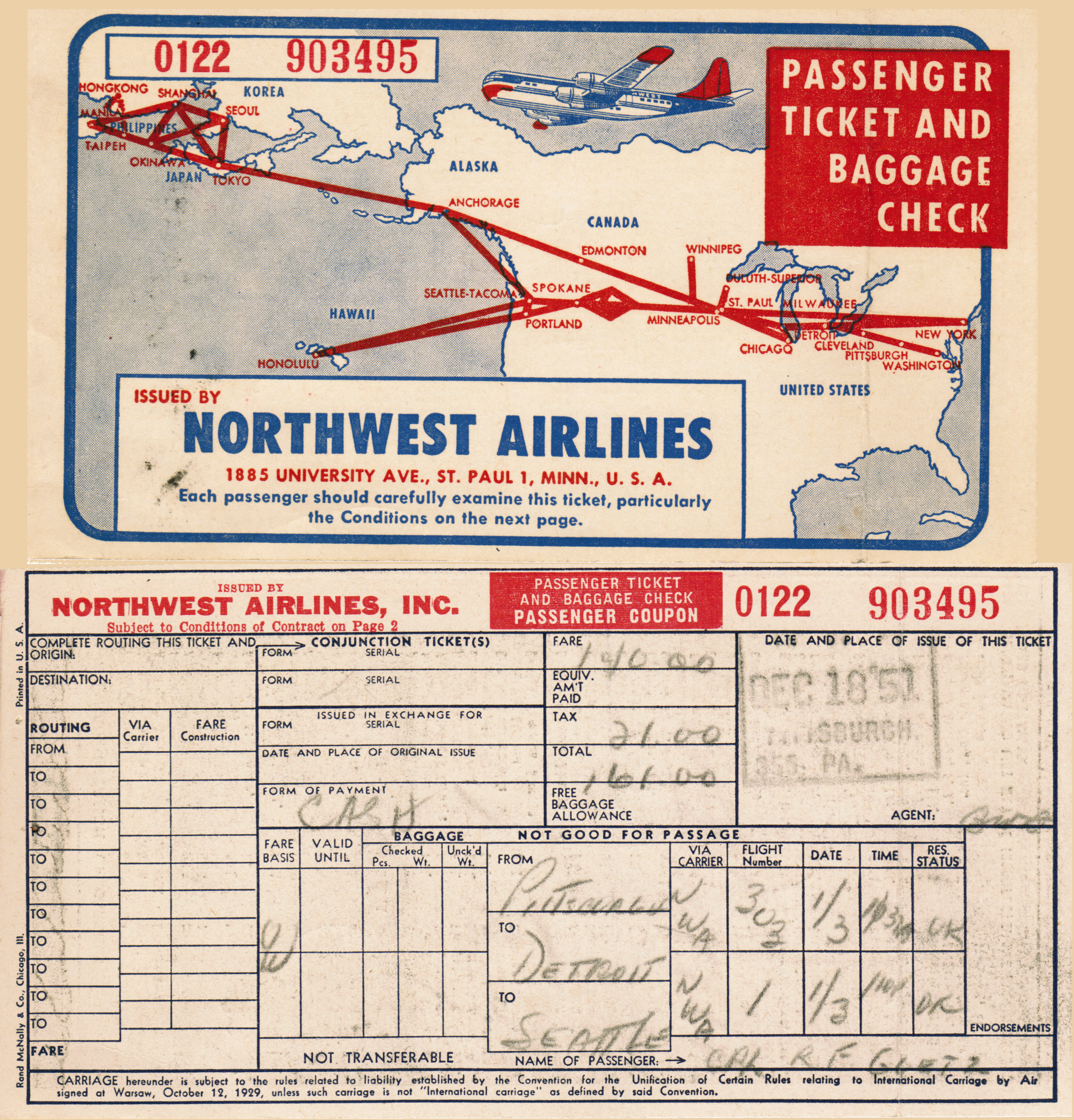
Northwest Airlines passenger ticket from 1951

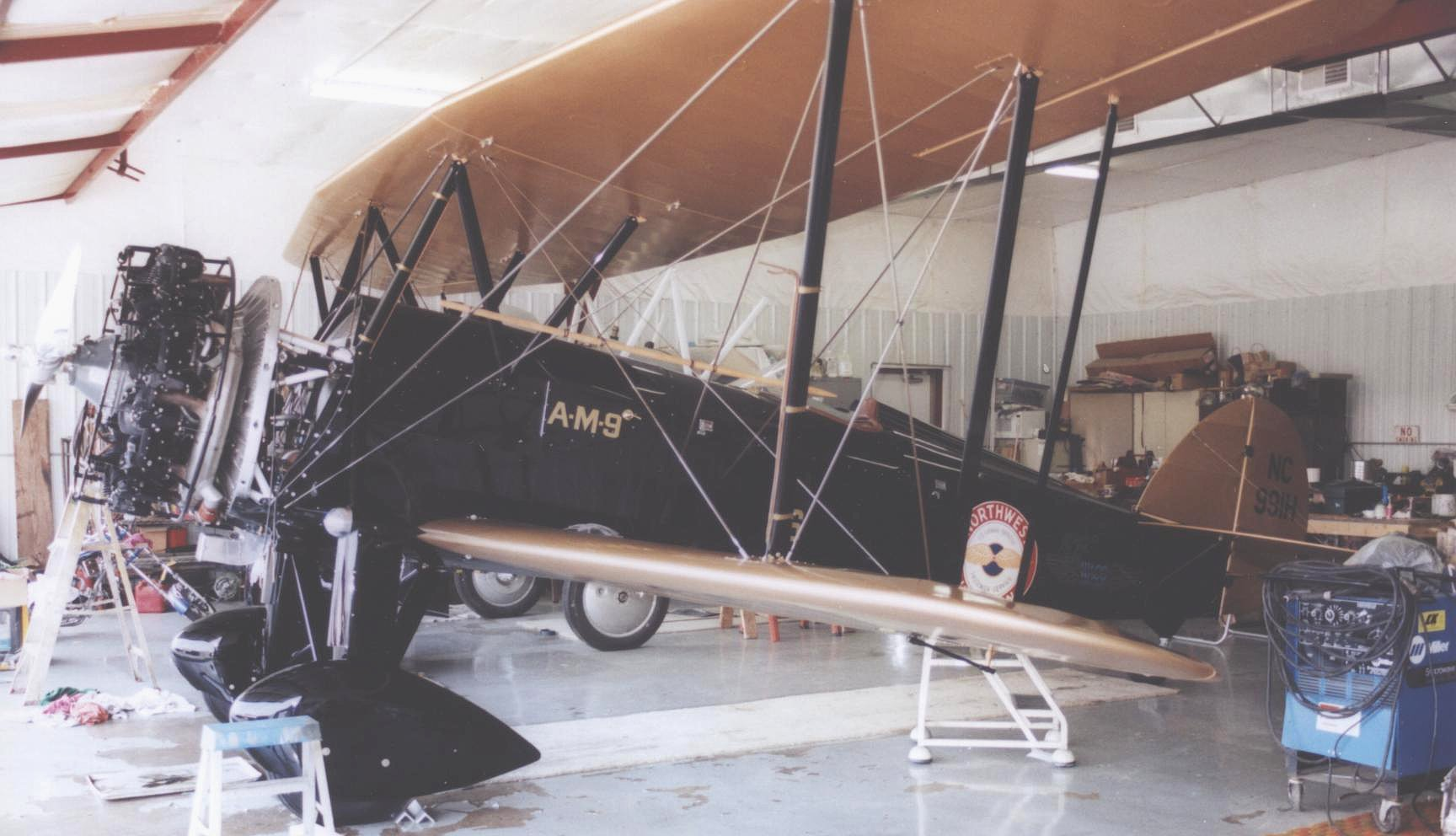
1929 Northwest Airways Waco JYM used on the Minneapolis-Chicago mail route

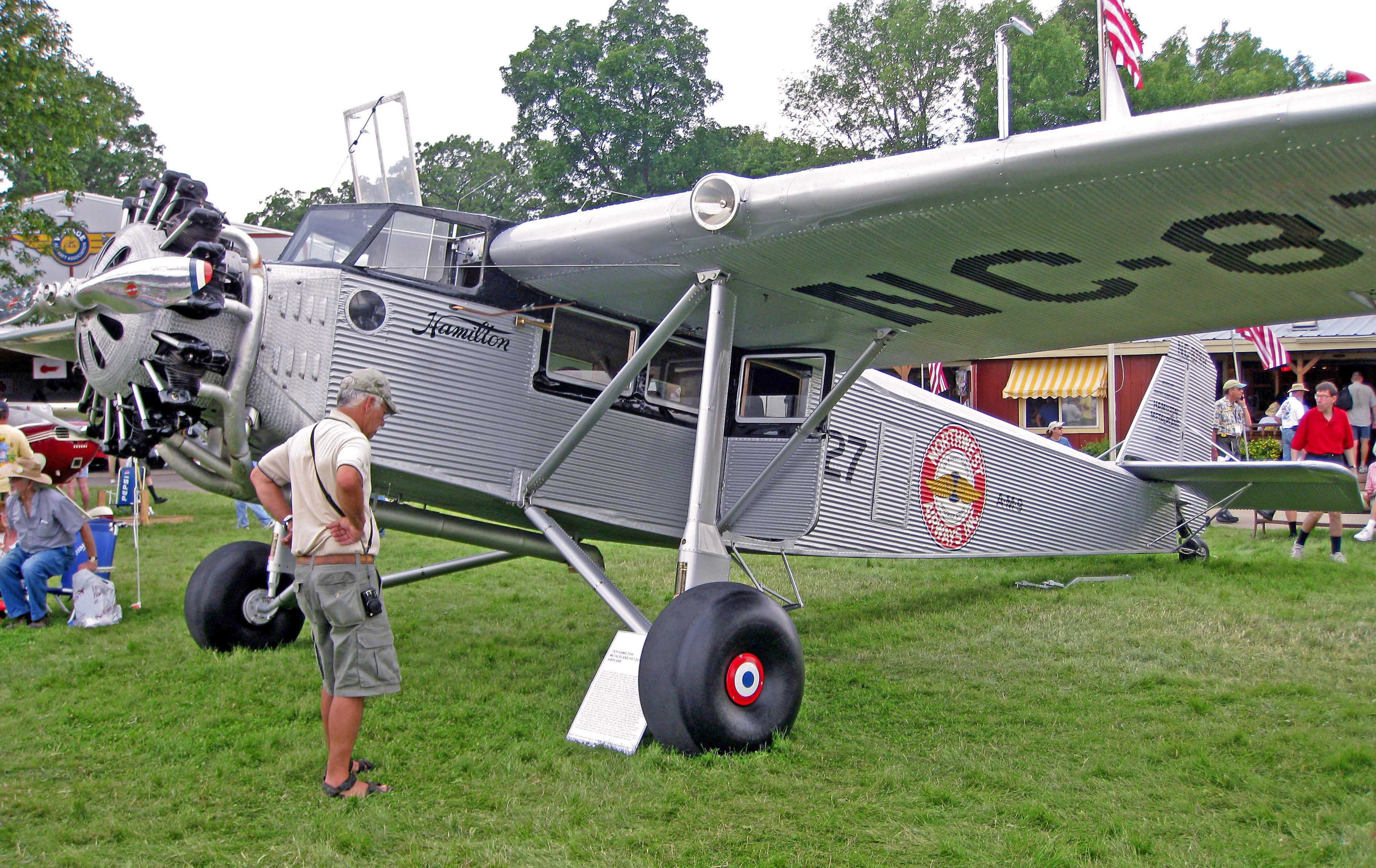
Rebuilt 1929 Hamilton H-47 wearing Northwest Airways markings in 2010

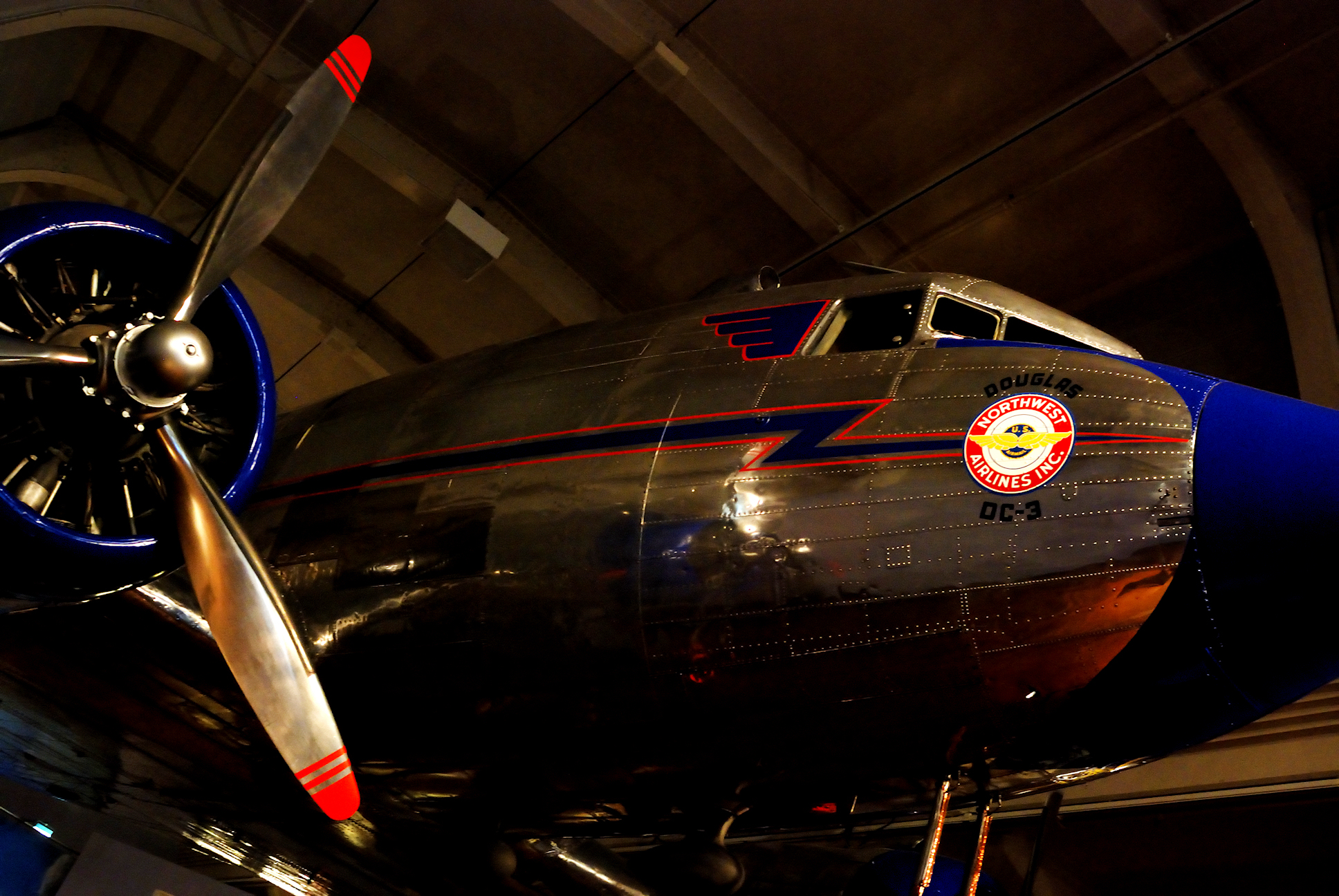
Northwest Douglas DC-3

Northwest Airlines began carrying passengers in 1927; in 1928, Northwest started its first international route with service to Winnipeg. In 1929, a group headed by Richard Lilly, a businessman from St. Paul, Minnesota, purchased the airline.

In 1933, Northwest was selected to fly the "Northern Transcontinental Route" to Seattle, Washington. It adopted the name Northwest Airlines the following year after the Air Mail scandal. Northwest Airways, Inc. changed its name to Northwest Airlines, Inc. and the airline was incorporated under its new name in the State of Minnesota.

In 1939, Northwest had five daily flights from Chicago to Minneapolis; three continued west to Seattle through North Dakota and Montana. Northwest also served Winnipeg, Manitoba, and Portland, Oregon, by spurs from its transcontinental route. By the spring of 1948, Northwest was operating three different aircraft types: the 44-passenger seat Douglas DC-4, the 21-passenger seat Douglas DC-3 and the 36-passenger seat Martin 2-0-2.

=== Transpacific network development ===
In 1931, Northwest sponsored Charles and Anne Lindbergh on a pioneering test flight to Japan via Alaska, scouting what would become known as the Northwest Airlines' Great Circle route that could save 2,000 miles (3,000 km) on a New York to Tokyo flight. Northwest began to bolster the infrastructure on the domestic leg of this route during World War II when it flew soldiers and supplies from the Northwestern United States to Alaska. It was at this point that Northwest began painting its airliners' tails bright red as a visual aid in the often harsh weather conditions. The airline's experience with the sub-arctic climate led the U.S. government to designate Northwest as the main airline over the North Pacific following the war.

In the spring of 1947, Northwest began stationing employees at Haneda Airport in Tokyo, flying them from the United States via Alaska on its Great Circle route. On July 15, 1947, Northwest was the first airline to begin direct service between the United States and Japan, using a Douglas DC-4 airliner named The Manila. (All pre-war airline service to East Asia had been via Hawaii and the Philippines.) The flight to Japan originated at Wold-Chamberlain Field in Minneapolis and stopped at Blatchford Field in Edmonton, Elmendorf AFB in Anchorage, and Shemya AAF in the western Aleutian Islands. The flight continued from Tokyo to Lunghwa Airport in Shanghai and then to Nichols Field at Manila.

A flight between Tokyo and Seoul (Gimpo Airport) began on October 20, 1947, and Naha Airport in Okinawa began to be a stop on the Tokyo to Manila route on November 16, 1947. Northwest service to Shanghai was suspended in May 1949 because of the civil war in China, with the Republic of China on the verge of collapse, and its government evacuated to the island of Formosa (Taiwan). Northwest Airlines added Songshan Airport in Taipei, the new capital city of the Republic of China, as a stop on the Tokyo-Okinawa-Manila route on June 3, 1950, with ongoing interchange service to Hong Kong operated by Hong Kong Airways.

=== Northwest Orient Airlines ===
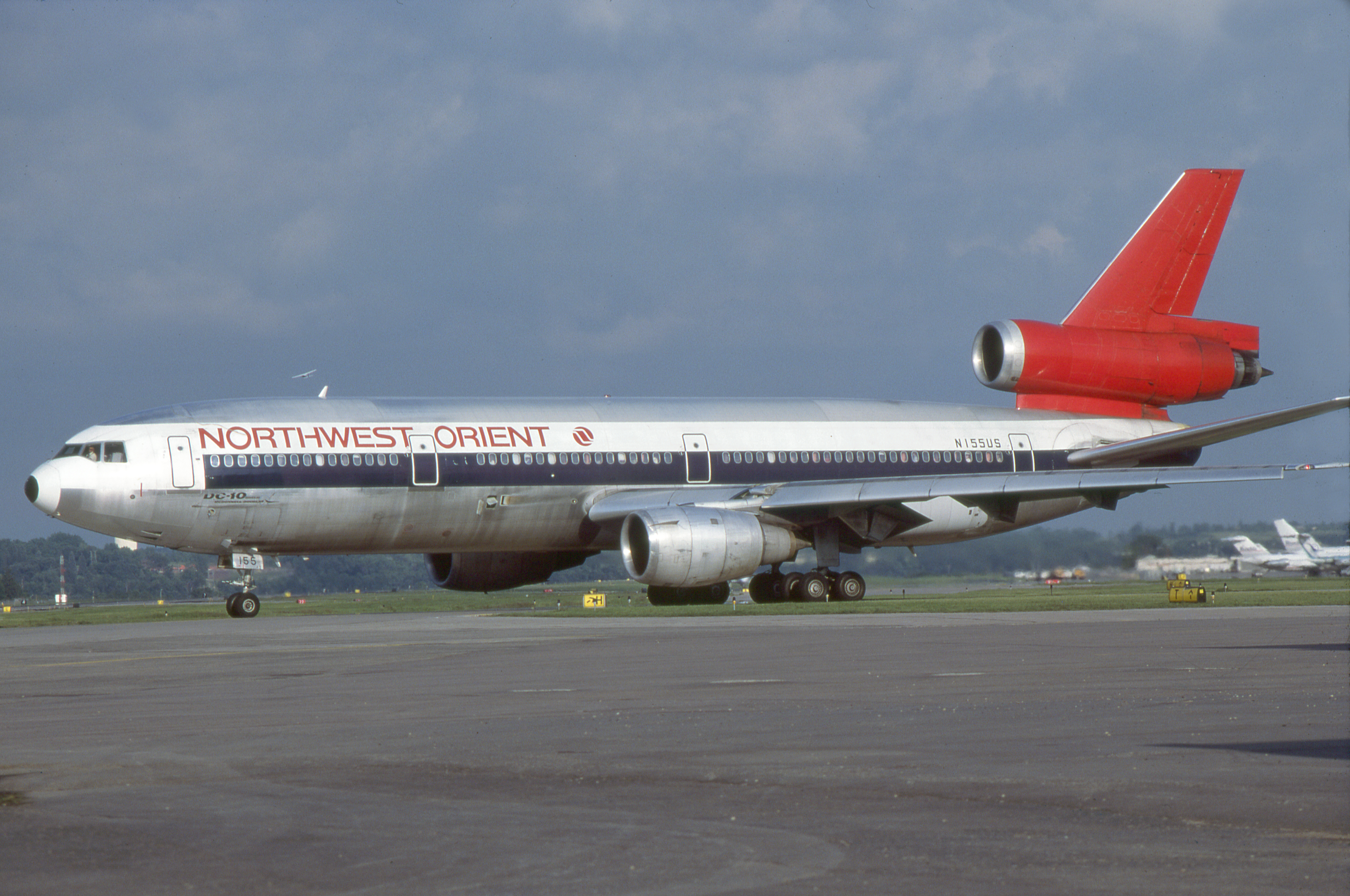
Northwest Orient McDonnell Douglas DC-10 at Detroit Metropolitan Airport in 1985.

With transpacific flights established, Northwest began branding as Northwest Orient Airlines between 1947 and 1986, although its registered corporate name remained "Northwest Airlines".

NWA continuously upgraded equipment on the transpacific routes. On June 22, 1949, Northwest received its first double-decker Boeing 377 "Stratocruiser", enabling more comfortable accommodations and faster transpacific flights. The Stratocruiser began flying from the West Coast to Honolulu in 1950 and to Tokyo via Alaska on September 27, 1952.

In 1954, Northwest Orient purchased Douglas DC-6Bs and started flying them to Tokyo and Manila. In January 1960, Northwest was operating transcontinental Lockheed L-188 Electra turboprop service nonstop between New York City and Seattle with these flights being part of the airline's service between New York City and Asia with Douglas DC-7C aircraft being operated on the transpacific legs from Seattle and was also operating Electra propjet flights between Minneapolis/St. Paul, Milwaukee and Chicago Midway Airport in the north and several destinations in Florida in the south including Miami, Fort Lauderdale and Tampa.

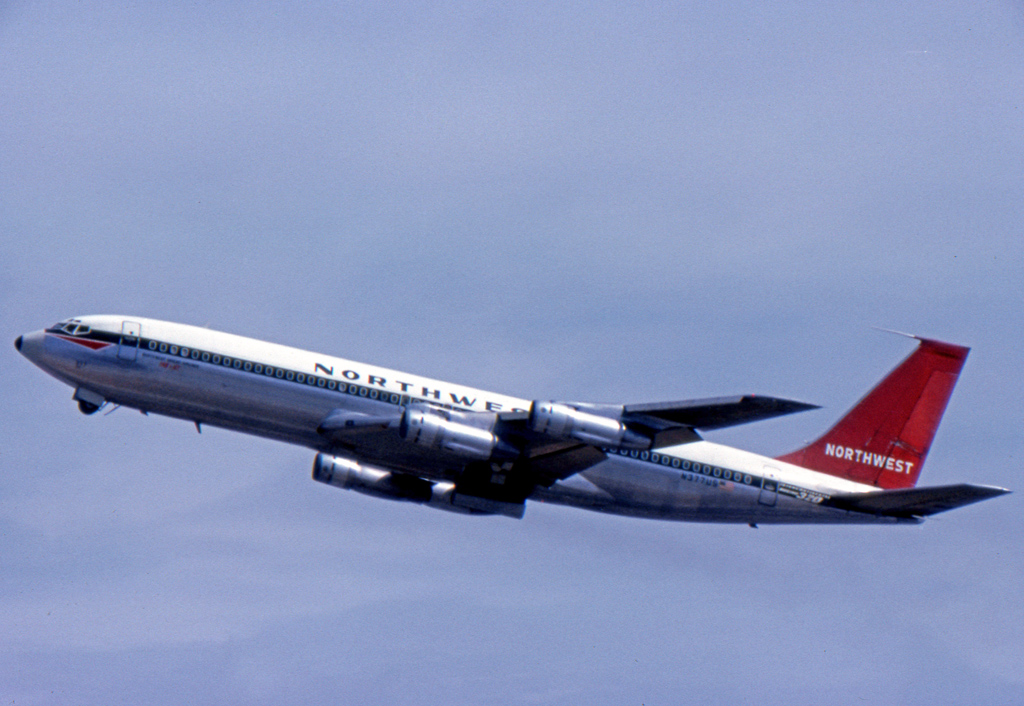
Boeing 707-351B at San Francisco International Airport in 1970

On July 8, 1960, Northwest placed the Douglas DC-8 into service, offering the shortest flight times to East Asia, but within a year the airline was negotiating the sale of the five DC-8s. Northwest retired the last of its Boeing 377 Stratocruisers that September. The airline purchased several Boeing 720Bs in 1961, and 1963 several new Boeing 707-320Bs; for a time it adopted the slogan "Northwest Orient: The Fan-Jet Airline". Nonstop transpacific flights became feasible with the introduction of the 707-320B/C. Northwest bought its first Boeing 747s in 1970 and soon began retiring its smaller 707s. In addition to operating the 747's on transpacific flights, Northwest briefly flew them on its busiest domestic routes as well.

For years Northwest was the largest foreign airline serving Japan. In 1951, Northwest became involved with the founding of Japan Air Lines (JAL) by leasing airliners and crewmembers to the new airline. In 1952, United States and Japan ratified a regional bilateral aviation treaty, under which Northwest and Pan American World Airways became the two U.S. airlines in Tokyo. These carriers also received fifth freedom rights to carry passengers from and via Tokyo to other Asian destinations such as Seoul, Busan, Taipei, Kaohsiung, Manila, Beijing, Shanghai, Guangzhou, Hong Kong, Bangkok, Kuala Lumpur and Singapore. Northwest also flew passenger routes from Japan to Guam and Saipan, U.S. possessions in Micronesia.

Northwest's meteorologists, led by Dan Sowa, pioneered the first clear-air turbulence forecasting system in 1957, important since the airline flew many northern routes over turbulence-prone mountain areas. Northwest remained a leader in turbulence prediction, providing TPAWS (turbulence prediction and warning services) to other airlines.

Revenue passenger traffic, in millions of passenger-miles (scheduled flights only, domestic plus international)

Year	Pax-Miles
1951	602
1955	1017
1960	1654
1965	3304
1970	4506
1975	9471

=== Transatlantic and domestic expansion ===
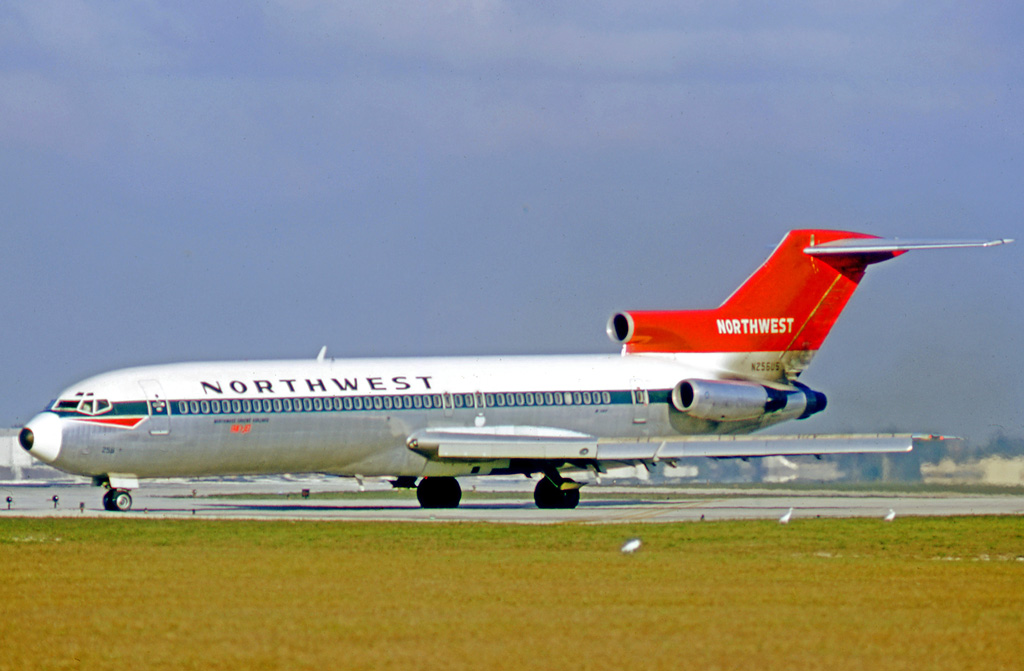
Boeing 727-200 at Miami Airport in February 1971

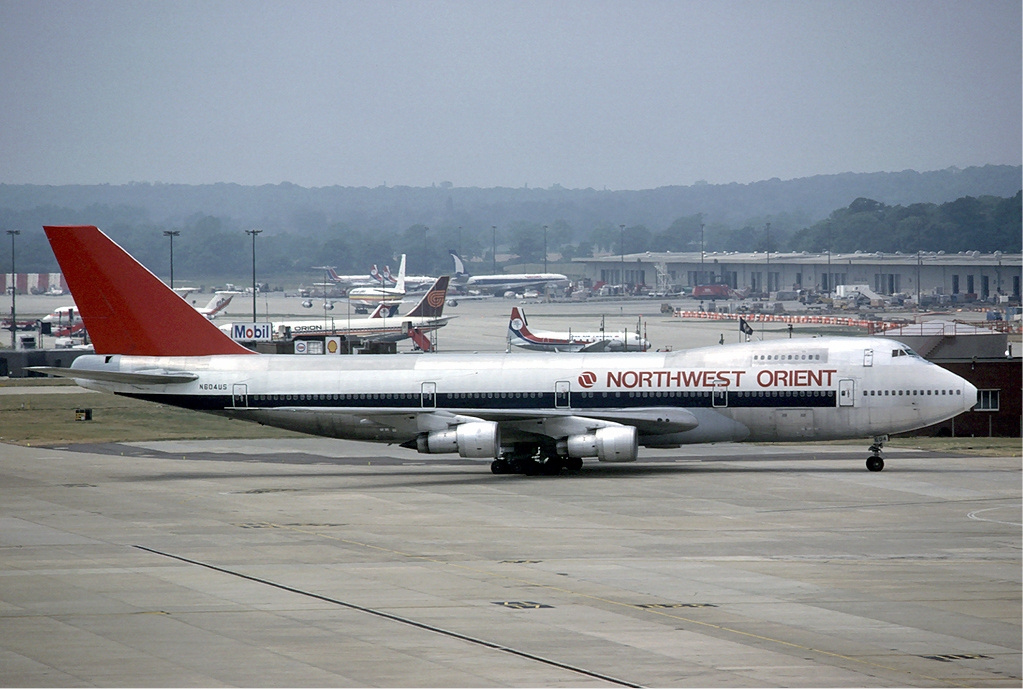
Boeing 747 at London Gatwick Airport in 1983, in pre-merger Northwest Orient livery

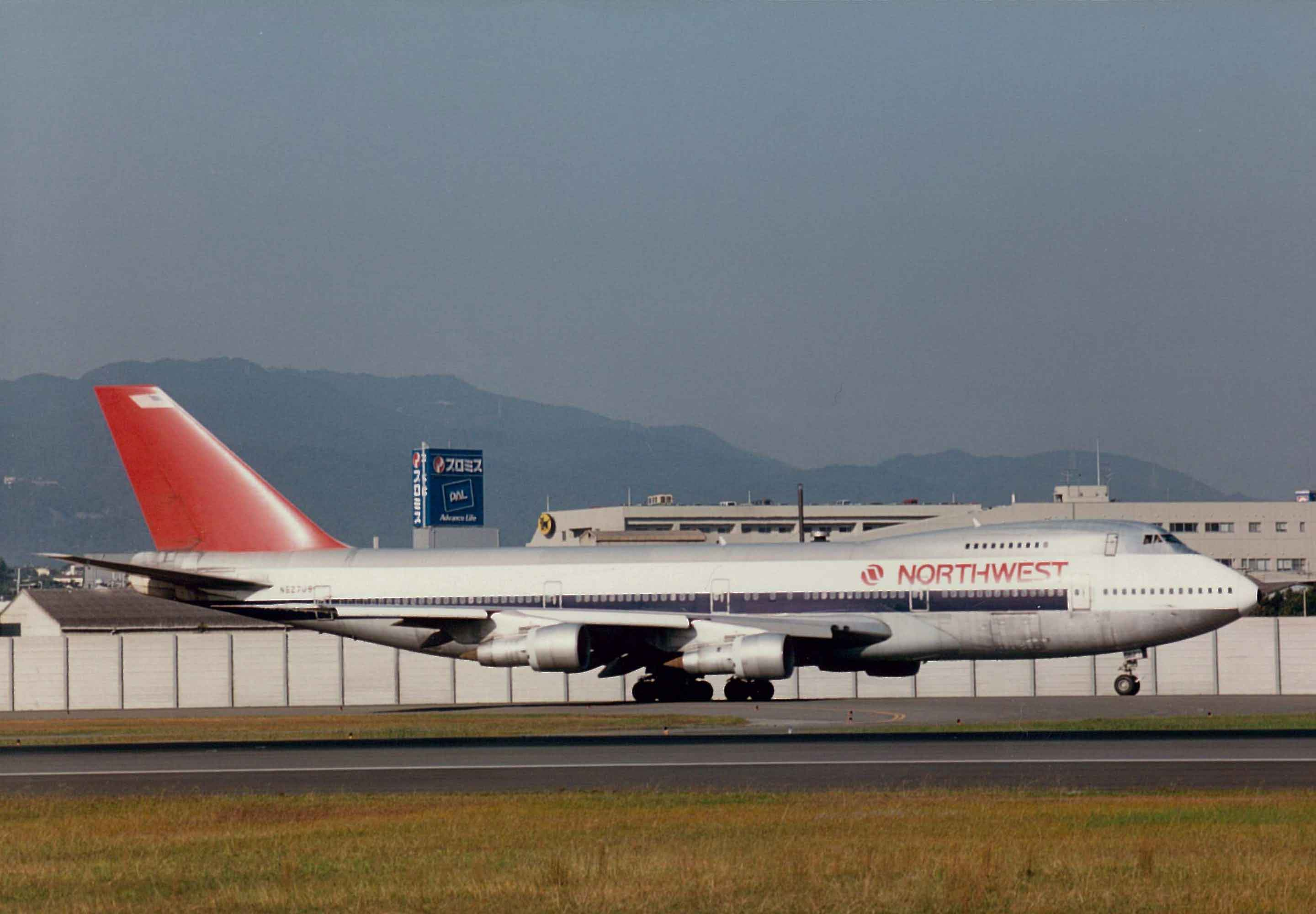
Boeing 747-100 at Osaka Itami Airport ca. 1990, in post-merger Northwest livery

During the regulated era, Northwest's domestic network was mainly along the northern transcontinental route through Chicago, Minneapolis, and Seattle; New York and Detroit were added in 1945. Northwest also served Hawaii from the West Coast, and, starting in 1958–1959, Georgia and Florida from Chicago. On June 1, 1959, Northwest accepted its first turboprop, the L-188 Electra, from the Lockheed Corporation. Northwest Airlines started flying the three-engine Boeing 727-100 in November 1964; many stretched B727-251s followed.

After airline deregulation in 1978, Northwest began nonstop flights to other Asian cities, returned to China in 1984 after a 34-year hiatus, and strengthened its presence in the southwestern United States. It also began flying to the United Kingdom, Ireland, Germany, and Scandinavia. On May 21, 1984, shareholders in Northwest approved the creation of NWA Inc., a Delaware corporation that became the holding company of Northwest.

On October 1, 1986, Northwest merged with Republic Airlines, also based in Minneapolis-St. Paul. It was the largest airline merger at the time and caused operational issues which led the combined carrier to have an on-time performance of just 42 percent in its early days. Through the merger, NWA adopted Republic's three-hub domestic network centered around Detroit, Memphis, and Minneapolis-St. Paul. The combined airline became particularly strong in the first two cities, with a market share of over 80% in each. After the merger, the airline dropped Orient from its branding. One major reason for the merger was that Northwest's unique position as a domestic and transpacific carrier had been challenged in 1985, when United Airlines acquired the Pacific Division of Pan Am.

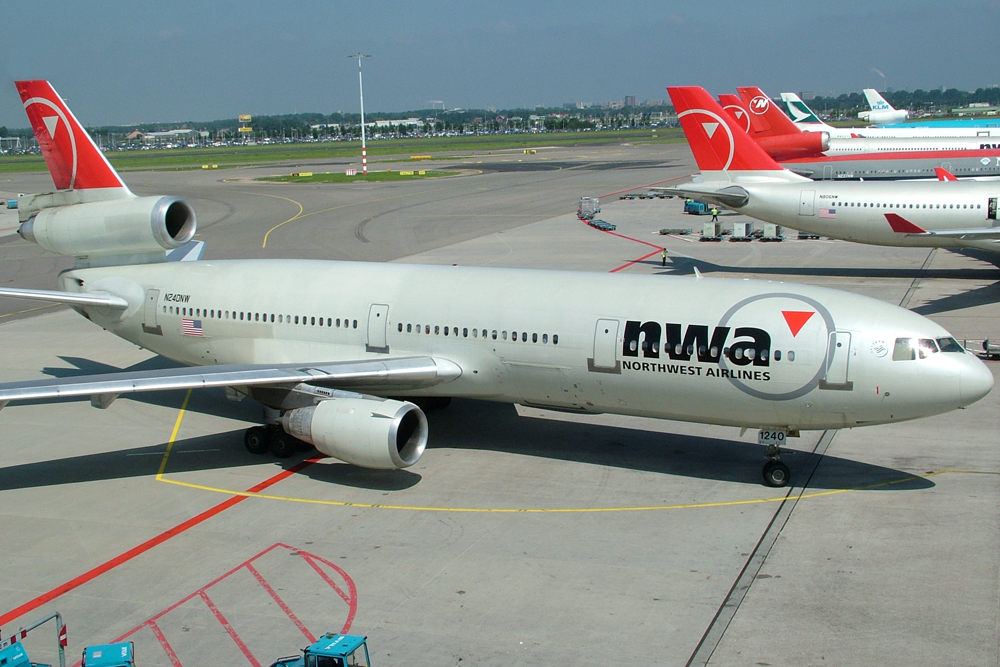
Northwest was one of the last passenger airlines to fly the DC-10 when its last one was retired on January 8, 2007

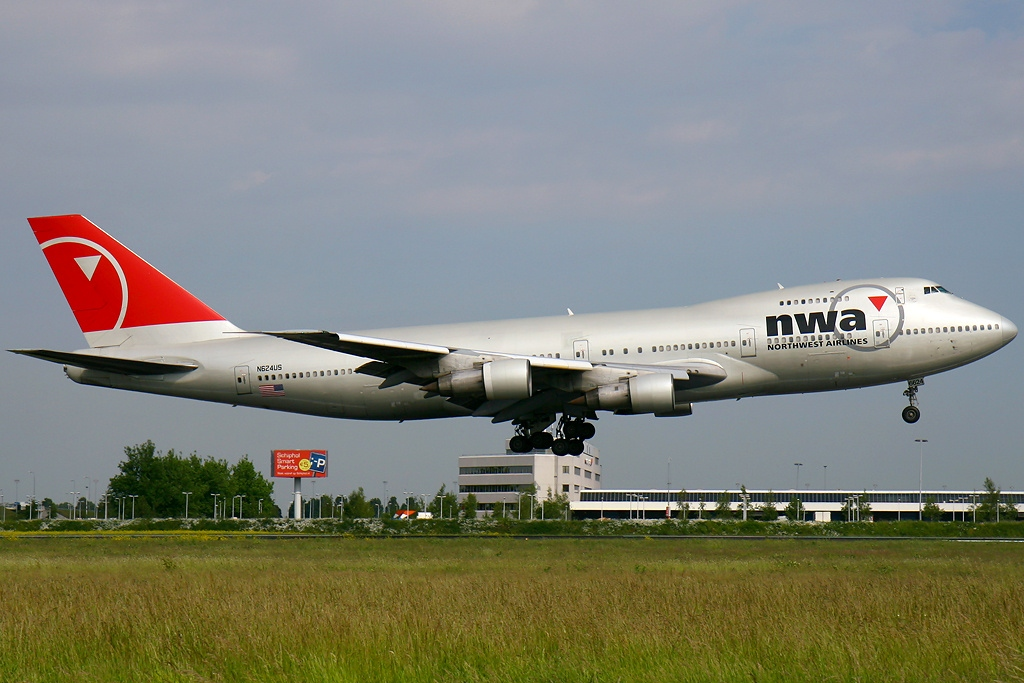
Northwest was also the last major US passenger airline to fly the original series Boeing 747 (pre-400 models)

Northwest continued to use the pre-merger Northwest Orient livery (minus the word "Orient") until a new livery and identity (designed by Landor Associates) were adopted in 1989. The new livery, nicknamed the "bowling shoe" by employees, featured colors of red, white, gray, and very dark blue.

Also in 1989, Northwest became the launch customer of the Boeing 747-400 and became one of only two airlines in the United States to operate it until its merger with Delta in 2009. The first aircraft it purchased was the first 747-400 to be built; it was later involved in a loss-of-control incident in 2002 and placed on display at the Delta Flight Museum following its retirement by Delta in 2015.

Northwest was purchased in a 1989 leveraged buyout by an investment group headed by Al Checchi, Fred Malek and Gary Wilson, with KLM, and many others. To pay off the debt incurred, the new management sold many of the airline's aircraft to leasing companies, and sold property around the world, including land in central Tokyo.

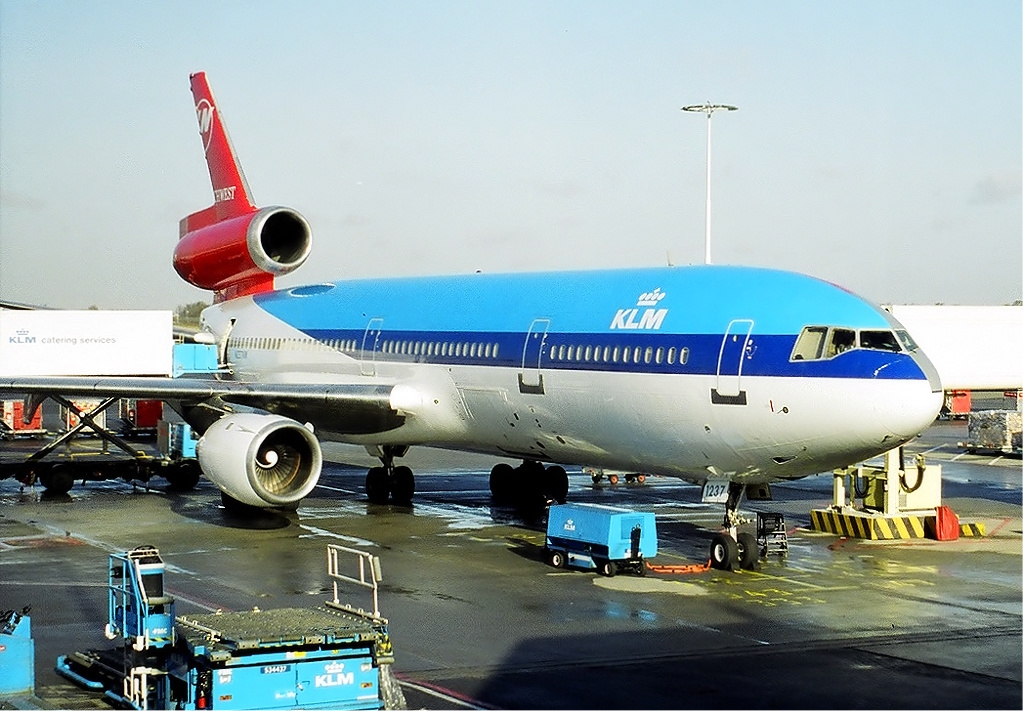
This Northwest DC-10, Registration N237NW, was painted in a hybrid Northwest-KLM livery to advertise the alliance between the two airlines

Also in 1993, Northwest began its strategic alliance with KLM, which was the largest airline partnership at that time. This partnership eventually became the Wings Alliance, but the alliance never grew beyond the two airlines. Northwest gradually pulled out of its minor European destinations and focused on domestic and Asian markets.

On May 1, 1996, Northwest inaugurated the first-ever nonstop service from North America to China, Detroit–Beijing. Nonstop Detroit–Shanghai service followed in April 2000. These nonstop services were suspended in 2002 due to the outbreak of severe acute respiratory syndrome (SARS). Northwest then served these routes via Tokyo. The airline sought government approval to restore nonstop Detroit–Shanghai service in March 2007 but lost its bid to United's Washington–Beijing route; however, before their merger with Delta Air Lines, Northwest received tentative authority to restart nonstop Detroit–Shanghai service starting March 25, 2009.

Through the late 1990s and early 2000s, Northwest enjoyed profits and focused on improving technology to increase convenience and reduce costs. The airline offered airport self-service check-in kiosks starting in 1997 and had more than any other airline. Northwest was the first large U.S. airline to offer internet check-in to passengers, with service from December 2000. During the early 2000s decade, Northwest acquired a reputation for refusing to adopt industry-wide fare increases that had been accepted by other airlines. This changed in March 2005, when Northwest adopted fare hikes in response to rising oil prices.

NWA logo, 1989–2003

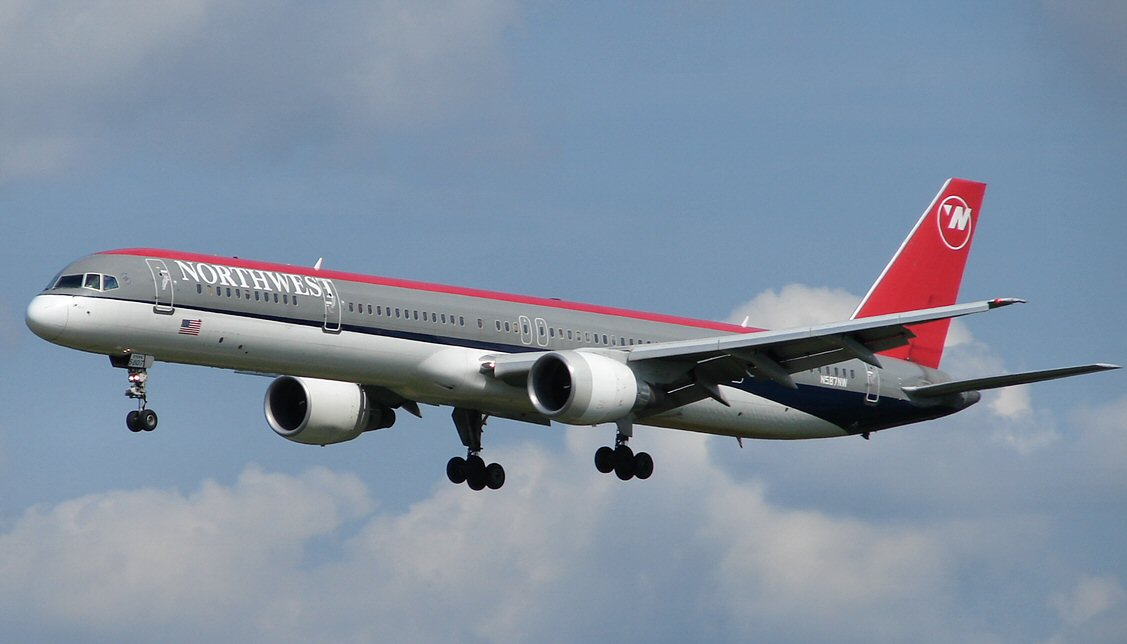
757-351 in the "Bowling Shoe" livery, used from 1989 until 2003.

Due to competition from low-cost carriers such as Southwest Airlines and the impact of paying increased wages in a new contract with employees represented by the Aircraft Mechanics Fraternal Association (AMFA) labor union, Northwest began to make cutbacks in early 2001. Two small rounds of employee layoffs and other cutbacks were implemented in the months before the September 11 attacks. Following the attacks, Northwest was forced to make dramatic changes to its business structure through major employee layoffs and other cost-cutting measures. The retirement of costly and aging aircraft such as the Boeing 727 and McDonnell Douglas DC-10-40 were accelerated as new aircraft went into service. In addition, the airline pursued options to reduce costs across the board, including removing pillows, peanuts, pretzels, in-flight entertainment on domestic flights, and newspapers and magazines. Over 50 McDonnell Douglas DC-9, Boeing 757, Boeing 747, and Airbus A320 family aircraft were withdrawn from use in an attempt to lower overall capacity and save money. Some of these aircraft were returned to service.

Following many years of a pioneering and close partnership with KLM Royal Dutch Airlines, Northwest, along with partners KLM and Continental Airlines, joined SkyTeam, an alliance of ten airlines from around the world, on September 15, 2004. This was partially a result of Air France merging with KLM, forming the Air France-KLM group. Northwest continued to hemorrhage money, however.

=== Bankruptcy ===
Northwest filed for Chapter 11 bankruptcy protection for the first time in its 79-year history on September 14, 2005, a day before a scheduled $65 million pension payment, and during a strike by its mechanics' union. With Northwest's filing, four of the six largest U.S. carriers were operating under bankruptcy protection: Northwest joined Delta Air Lines (which filed just minutes before), United Airlines, and US Airways in bankruptcy. Northwest CEO Doug Steenland said that high fuel prices forced the airline to seek court protection; the relatively high age of Northwest's fleet exacerbated the impact of fuel prices on its finances.

In the following weeks, Northwest Airlink carriers Mesaba Airlines and Pinnacle Airlines both announced that Northwest Airlines had missed payments to them for their Airlink flying. Northwest also announced plans to shrink its Airlink fleet by over 45 aircraft. Mesaba Aviation filed for Chapter 11 Bankruptcy on October 13, 2005.

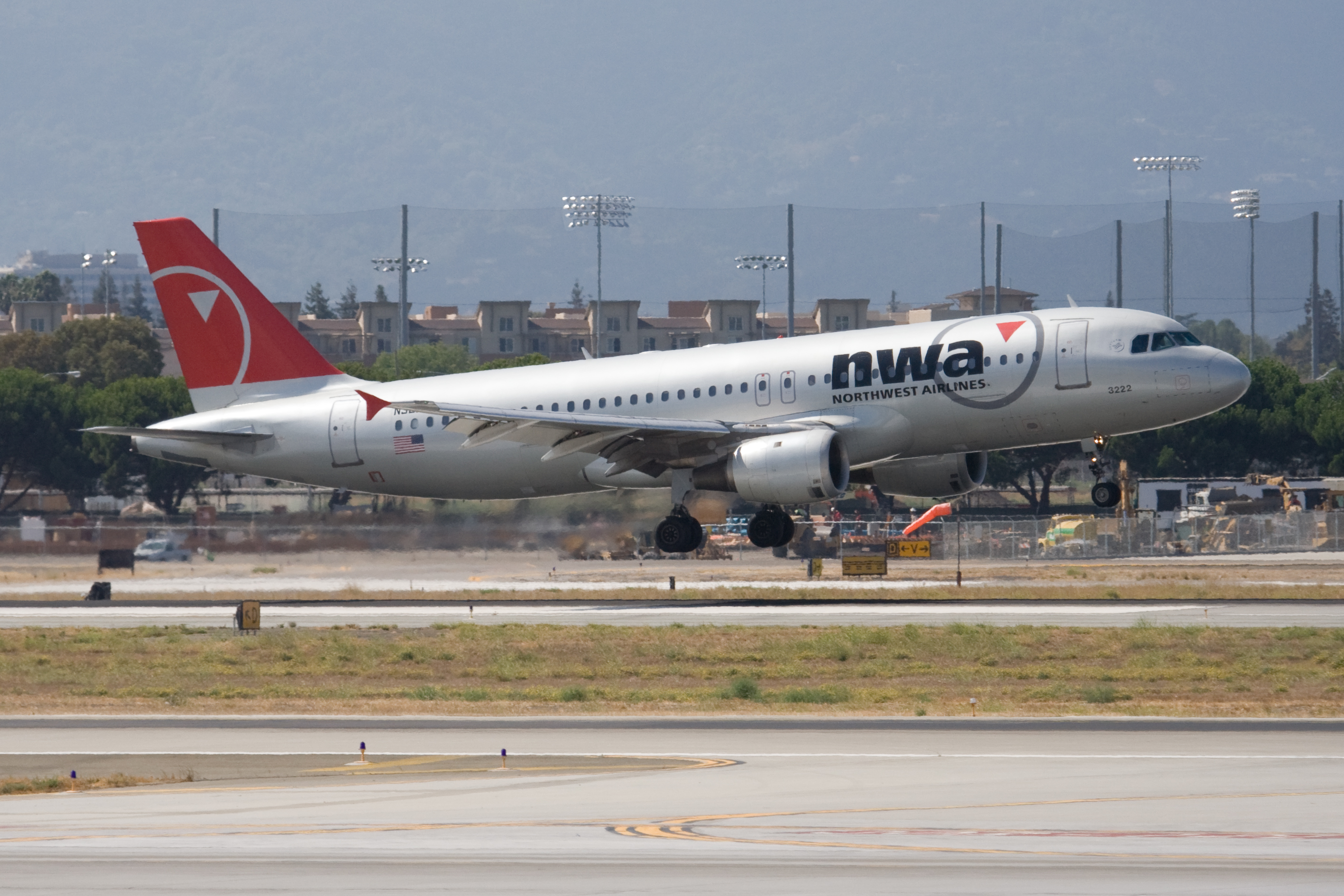
A320-212 at San Jose in Northwest's final livery (2004-2010) before its closure.

Following its bankruptcy filing, Northwest renegotiated its labor contracts, lowering its highest level of flight attendant pay from $44,190 to $35,400. Northwest stock resumed trading on a "when-issued" basis on May 21, 2007, and regular trading began on May 31, 2007. On May 18, 2007, Northwest Airlines was cleared by a federal bankruptcy judge to emerge from Chapter 11 Bankruptcy protection on May 31, 2007, ending Northwest's 20 months of difficulty trying to slash costs.

On July 16, 2007, Northwest Airlines applied to the United States Department of Transportation for nonstop service between its WorldGateway hub in Detroit to Shanghai (beginning in 2007 on Boeing 747-400s) and to Beijing (beginning in 2010 on Boeing 787 Dreamliners). The airline faced off against Delta Air Lines (which proposed Atlanta to Shanghai and Beijing), American Airlines (Chicago/O'Hare–Beijing), Continental Airlines (Newark–Shanghai), US Airways (Philadelphia–Beijing), United Airlines (Los Angeles–Shanghai and San Francisco–Guangzhou), and MAXjet (Seattle–Shanghai) in the route competition.

On August 12, 2007, Northwest Airlines became a passive investor in the purchase of Midwest Airlines by TPG Capital. The airline stated that while it was an investor, it would not participate in any management or control of Midwest Airlines. However, on August 14, 2007, AirTran Airways raised their offer for Midwest to $16.25 a share, 25 cents more than the TPG offer. But soon after on August 17, 2007, TPG Capital raised their offer to $17.00 a share which sealed the deal. Northwest Airlines became a minority owner of Midwest Airlines in the fourth quarter of 2007.

On September 25, 2007, Northwest Airlines received DOT approval to begin service to Shanghai from its Detroit hub beginning March 25, 2009. American, Continental, Delta, and US Airways also received new or additional China route authority to Shanghai or Beijing, and United received authority to serve Guangzhou.

=== Merger with Delta Air Lines ===
Most common symbol for the merger

On April 14, 2008, Northwest Airlines announced that it would be merging with Delta Air Lines to form the world's largest airline. The merger was approved on October 29, 2008. The CEO during the merger of Delta and Northwest was Richard Anderson who was Northwest Airlines CEO from 2001 to 2004. The combined airline uses the Delta name and branding. On October 1, 2009, Northwest WorldPerks merged into SkyMiles. On January 31, 2010, Delta completed the merge of the reservation systems and discontinued using the Northwest name for flights. The official final flight was Northwest Airlines Flight 2470 from Los Angeles to Las Vegas.

=== NWA Cargo ===
As of 2006, Northwest Airlines Cargo was the largest cargo carrier among U.S. combination passenger and cargo airlines. NWA Cargo's fleet of dedicated Boeing 747 freighter aircraft flew from some key cities in the United States and East Asia, as well as Amsterdam, connecting with the carrier's cargo hub in Anchorage, Alaska (Ted Stevens Anchorage International Airport), facilitating the quick transfer of cargo between large cities on both sides of the Pacific. NWA Cargo also transports freight aboard the passenger fleet of Northwest Airlines to more than 250 cities worldwide. Delta announced that the NWA Cargo hub will be shut down by the end of 2009. As of early 2008, NWA's largest cargo client was DHL International. In December 2007, NWA announced that DHL International would terminate its cargo agreement with the airline effective late 2008. According to NWA Chief Financial Officer Dave Davis, the loss of its largest cargo client would bring significant changes to the division. Further changes to the NWA Cargo division continued into 2009 as it was merged into the Delta Cargo service. NWA Cargo ended all operations on December 28, 2009. On July 30, 2010, Northwest pleaded guilty to one count of felony price fixing for fixing prices for cargo shipping via NWA Cargo.

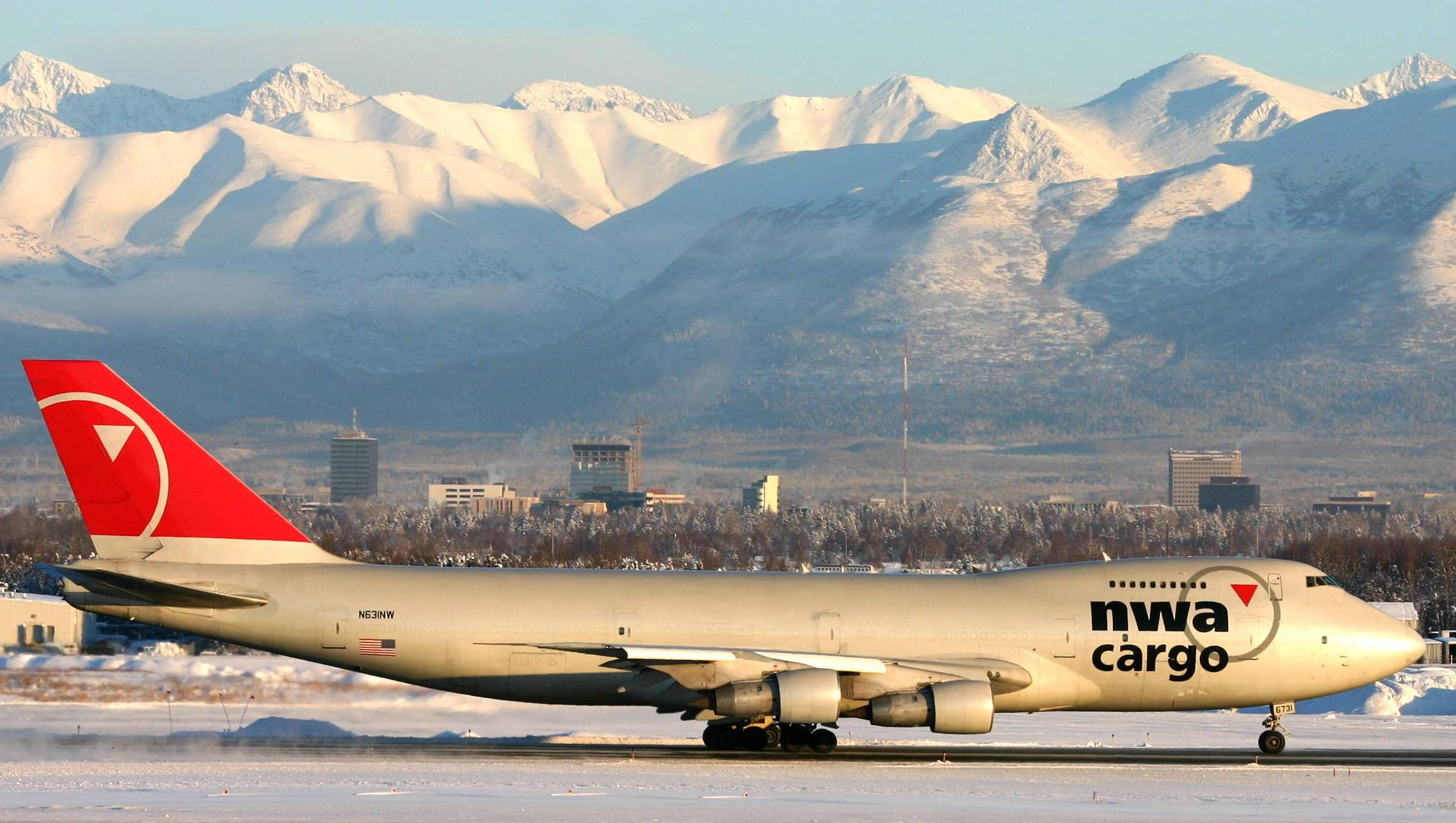
Northwest Cargo Boeing 747 at Ted Stevens Anchorage International Airport (2008)

== Corporate affairs and identity ==
=== Headquarters ===
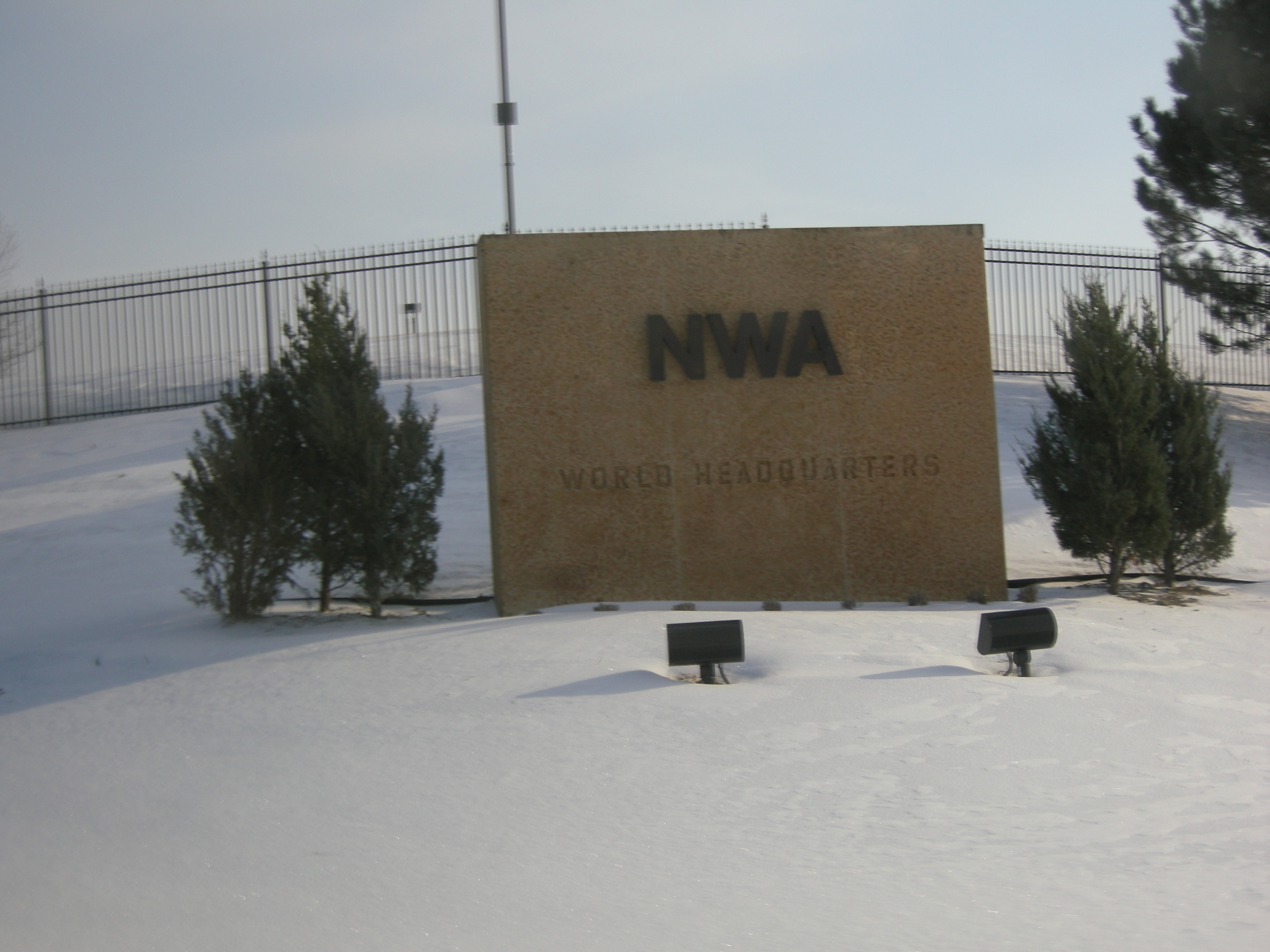
Entrance sign to Northwest Airlines headquarters in Eagan

Immediately before Northwest ceased being an independent airline, its headquarters was in Building A, a facility in Eagan, Minnesota, near Minneapolis-St. Paul International Airport and the intersection of I-35E and Interstate 494. The 266,899-square-foot (24,795.7 m^{2}) building in the complex, which housed about 1,000 Northwest employees, was built in 1985. The building had a large "N" painted on the roof.

After Delta and Northwest merged, Delta moved the Eagan headquarters employees to other offices in the Minneapolis–Saint Paul area. In October 2009 Delta Air Lines hired a real estate broker to put the 108-acre (44 ha) former Northwest Airlines headquarters complex for sale or lease. During that month the facility had a taxable value of $13.7 million. The airline marketed 36 acres (15 ha) of the former NWA facility that is located along Interstate 494 separately from the main part of the property, as the airline considered the property to be excess. Terry Kingston, the executive director of the real estate brokerage firm Cushman & Wakefield, stated that there had been some interest in the Northwest Airlines property from other parties. Northwest was the only occupant of the four-story headquarters building. Employees remaining in the Minneapolis area were moved to Building C, the former Republic Airlines headquarters building, located on the property of Minneapolis-St. Paul International Airport, as well as Building J located in Eagan.

Before the headquarters were in Eagan, they were on the grounds of Minneapolis–St. Paul International Airport.

=== Labor relations ===
A recurring issue in Northwest's history was its troubled labor relations. In 1998, Northwest walked away from the bargaining table, locked out its pilots (represented by the Air Line Pilots Association, International) and shut down the airline for more than two weeks. The airline sustained heavy losses as a result, and ended 1998 in the red, after being profitable since 1993.

On January 5, 2000, Northwest Airlines filed a federal lawsuit against the flight attendants' union and a number of rank-and-file employees. Along with its January 5 complaint, Northwest Airlines filed a motion for discovery, requesting searches of the hard drives of the office and home computers of union officials. Additionally, Northwest requested searches of the home computers of rank-and-file employees, including Kevin Griffin and Frank Reed. On February 8, Minnesota District Court Judge Boylan approved the request and issued the discovery order. The order required all 43 named defendants, officers and rank-and-file members to turn over both home and office computer equipment to the accounting company Ernst & Young for "purposes of examining and copying information and communications contained on the computer hard drives." The order permitted the discovery of all data, including e-mail communications. After conducting discovery, Northwest Airlines fired over a dozen employees in early March, stating that they had engaged in a sickout. The Union filed grievances claiming none of the employees' sick calls were false. The effect on intra-airline email use was marked: postings critical of Northwest Airlines by employees dwindled, and the majority of messages after the search were posted anonymously.

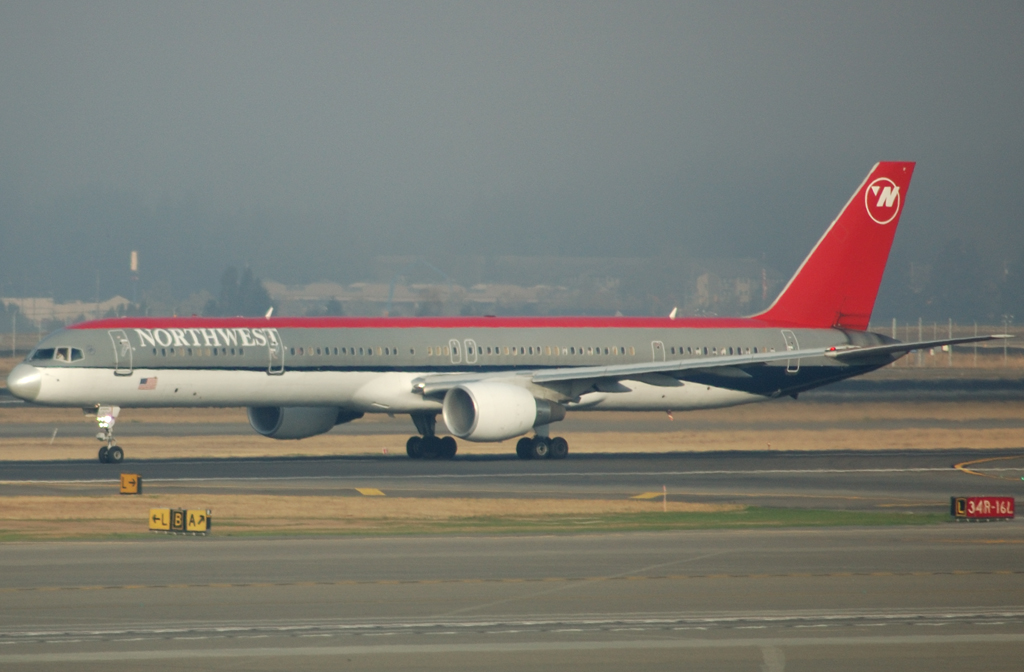
Northwest Airlines 757-351 in the "bowling shoe" livery (2006)

On August 20, 2005, after months of negotiations, an impasse declared by the NMB and a 30-day cooling off period, the over 4,750 Northwest aircraft mechanics, janitors, and aircraft cleaners represented by AMFA went on strike against the company. After numerous negotiation sessions, no agreement was reached, and the company began hiring permanent replacement workers. In mid-October, after permanently hiring about 500 non-union workers, Northwest made a final offer to the union. The offer would have saved 500 union jobs and offered four weeks of severance pay to terminated employees. This offer was worse than the original declined by the union, which would have saved over 2,000 jobs and offered 16 weeks of severance pay. On October 20, 2005, AMFA announced that it would not allow its members to vote on the offer, citing that parts of the contract would violate the union's commitment to its members. Finally, in late December 2005, Northwest made what it termed its "final offer" to the union. The agreement would have terminated all striking workers and given them rights to unemployment compensation. The union voted down the offer. On October 9, 2006, AMFA leadership and Northwest reached an agreement. Under the settlement, all AMFA workers still on strike as of that date were converted to lay-off status with five weeks of severance pay (ten weeks if they resigned from Northwest). However, these employees had a right-of-recall to their old jobs. The settlement was approved on November 6, 2006.

On May 30, 2007, it was announced that the flight attendants narrowly agreed to concessions and became the last major workgroup at Northwest to agree to new contract terms. The deal was approved by a vote of 2,966 to 2,862. Union leaders said that 90.5 percent of eligible voters cast ballots. The new contract would provide Northwest with $1.9 billion in annual cuts through 2011.

Negotiations with attendants had been ongoing and contentious for several years. The flight attendants were unable to strike during negotiations because of a court injunction and the refusal of the mediation board to release them from bargaining which would have allowed the setting of a strike deadline. The attendants had been working under imposed pay cuts and work rules since July 2006 when a previous tentative agreement was rejected by 55 percent of the voting members.

== Destinations ==
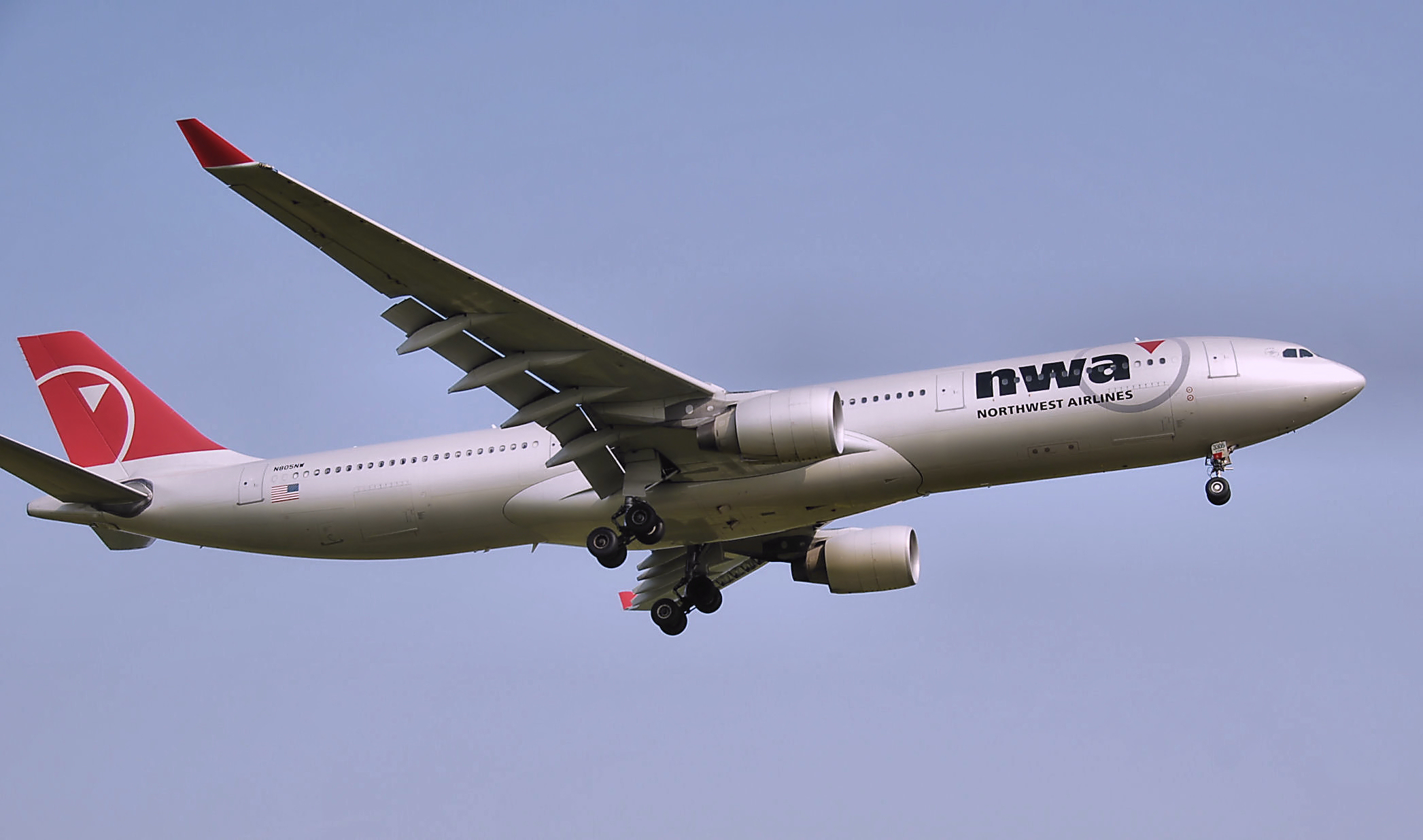
Northwest Airlines A330-323X landing at London Gatwick Airport

In 1991, Northwest began service to Australia, after United and Qantas began non-stop flights to the continental U.S. using the newly introduced, long-range 747-400. Northwest routed its Sydney–New York flight through Osaka, which raised Japanese protest because less than 30% of passengers on the Australia–Japan segment were originating in the U.S.

On May 1, 1996, Northwest began the first-ever non-stop service from North America to mainland China, from Detroit to Beijing, three times a week. From 1996 until 2002, Northwest operated nonstop flights from its Detroit hub to Beijing and Shanghai. Eventually, these routes were suspended. When that happened, Northwest operated these routes from Detroit with a connection at its Tokyo–Narita hub. However, on July 16, 2007, Northwest re-applied with the US Department of Transportation for nonstop service between Detroit and both Beijing and Shanghai. On September 25, 2007, the US Department of Transportation tentatively awarded authority to Northwest for a new Detroit to Shanghai (Pudong) route effective March 25, 2009. The route was to be flown using the Boeing 747-400 until the Boeing 787 Dreamliner aircraft became available, however, the Detroit–Shanghai nonstop route was taken over by Delta on October 24, 2009, using its Boeing 777-200ER and Boeing 777-200LR aircraft after Delta ended nonstop service between Atlanta and Shanghai due to weak customer demand. The Detroit-Beijing nonstop route was later launched by the merged Delta using a Boeing 777-200ER on July 1, 2011.

In 2008, Northwest was one of several U.S. airlines to receive permission from the British government to fly into Heathrow Airport in London after previously having to use Gatwick Airport. Northwest began service to Heathrow from its hubs in Detroit and Minneapolis, as well as starting Seattle-London service. However, after being acquired by Delta in 2008, the Seattle route was dropped in January 2009 so the Heathrow landing slot and aircraft used could be redeployed to a more profitable route. In 2009, the Heathrow routes from the Detroit and Minneapolis hubs were taken over by Delta using its Boeing 767-400ER aircraft.

=== Codeshare agreements ===
Throughout its existence, Northwest Airlines had codeshare agreements with the following airlines:

- Air China
- Air France
- Alaska Airlines
- Alitalia
- Asiana Airlines
- America West Airlines (codeshared on flights from Asia)
- American Eagle
- China Airlines
- China Southern Airlines
- Continental Airlines (Discontinued after Continental left SkyTeam.)
- Czech Airlines
- Delta Air Lines (Merger partner)
- Gulfstream International Airlines
- Hawaiian Airlines
- Horizon Air
- Japan Airlines
- Kenya Airways
- KLM
- KLM Cityhopper
- Korean Air
- Malév Hungarian Airlines
- Midwest Airlines
- Pinnacle Airlines

== Fleet ==
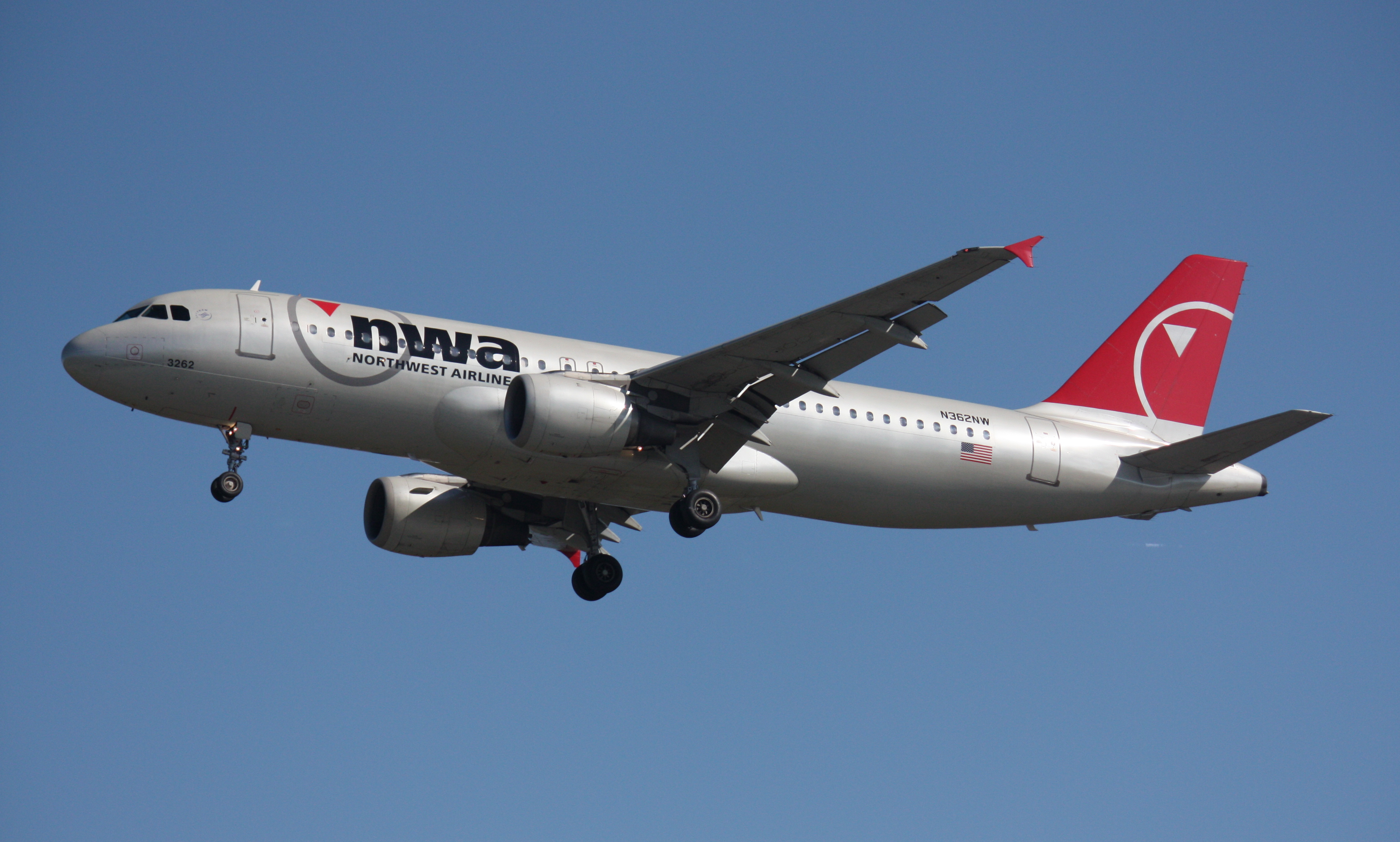
Northwest Airlines Airbus A320 landing at Vancouver International Airport

At the time of the merger with Delta Air Lines, Northwest had a total of 320 aircraft with seven on order. It was also the last U.S. passenger airline to have a dedicated cargo fleet and cargo-only routes. The Northwest fleet was integrated into Delta's fleet on December 31, 2009.

Northwest operated a mixed fleet of Boeing, McDonnell Douglas, and Airbus aircraft whereas Delta operated just Boeing and McDonnell Douglas aircraft. The Boeing 757 was the only type common to the pre-merger fleets of both Delta and Northwest.

As part of fleet renewal program in 1987, Northwest considered the McDonnell Douglas MD-11 but had reservations and selected the IAE SuperFan powered Airbus A340 for a firm 20 orders to begin in April 1993 as well as 10 options for the A330. With the SuperFan cancelled, Northwest cancelled its order in late 1992 amid post-Gulf War oil price increases but later ordered the A330. As part of a major fleet renewal program, Northwest introduced a simplified new paint scheme and logo in 2003. The airline replaced its McDonnell Douglas DC-10 airliners with the Airbus A330. The first Airbus A330-300, used initially for European flights, arrived on August 6, 2003. Northwest Airlines also possessed the youngest trans-Atlantic fleet of any North American or European airline. Northwest Airlines also began flying reconfigured Boeing 757-200 airliners on some of its European flights carrying fewer passengers. Northwest was one of only two passenger airlines in the United States to fly the Boeing 747-400, the other being United Airlines. A number of Boeing 747-400 aircraft formerly operated by Northwest were then also flown by Delta following the merger of the two air carriers including the first Boeing 747-400 ever built with this aircraft currently on public display at the Delta Flight Museum located at Hartsfield-Jackson Atlanta International Airport (ATL).

Northwest was looking for manufacturers to discuss the replacement of their 100, 110 and 125 seat McDonnell Douglas DC-9 (DC-9-10, DC-9-30 and DC-9-50) aircraft, with an average age of 35 years.

== Cabin ==
In March 1988, Northwest Airlines announced that it would ban smoking on all flights within North America, effective April 23, 1988, on the same day that a rule from the U.S. federal government prohibiting smoking on all domestic flights of a duration of two hours or fewer, would take into effect. Northwest was the first major U.S. airline to enact a smoking ban since Muse Air had ended its four-year smoking ban in 1985.

=== World Business Class ===
World Business Class logo

World Business Class was Northwest Airlines' international business class product. It was offered on all widebody aircraft. Seats had 60 inches of pitch and 176 degrees of recline. Passengers aboard this class received free meals and refreshments, including alcoholic beverages. All seats were equipped with Audio-Video-On-Demand (AVOD), universal power ports, a moveable reading light, a folding work table, and a swivel cocktail table.

=== Domestic First Class ===
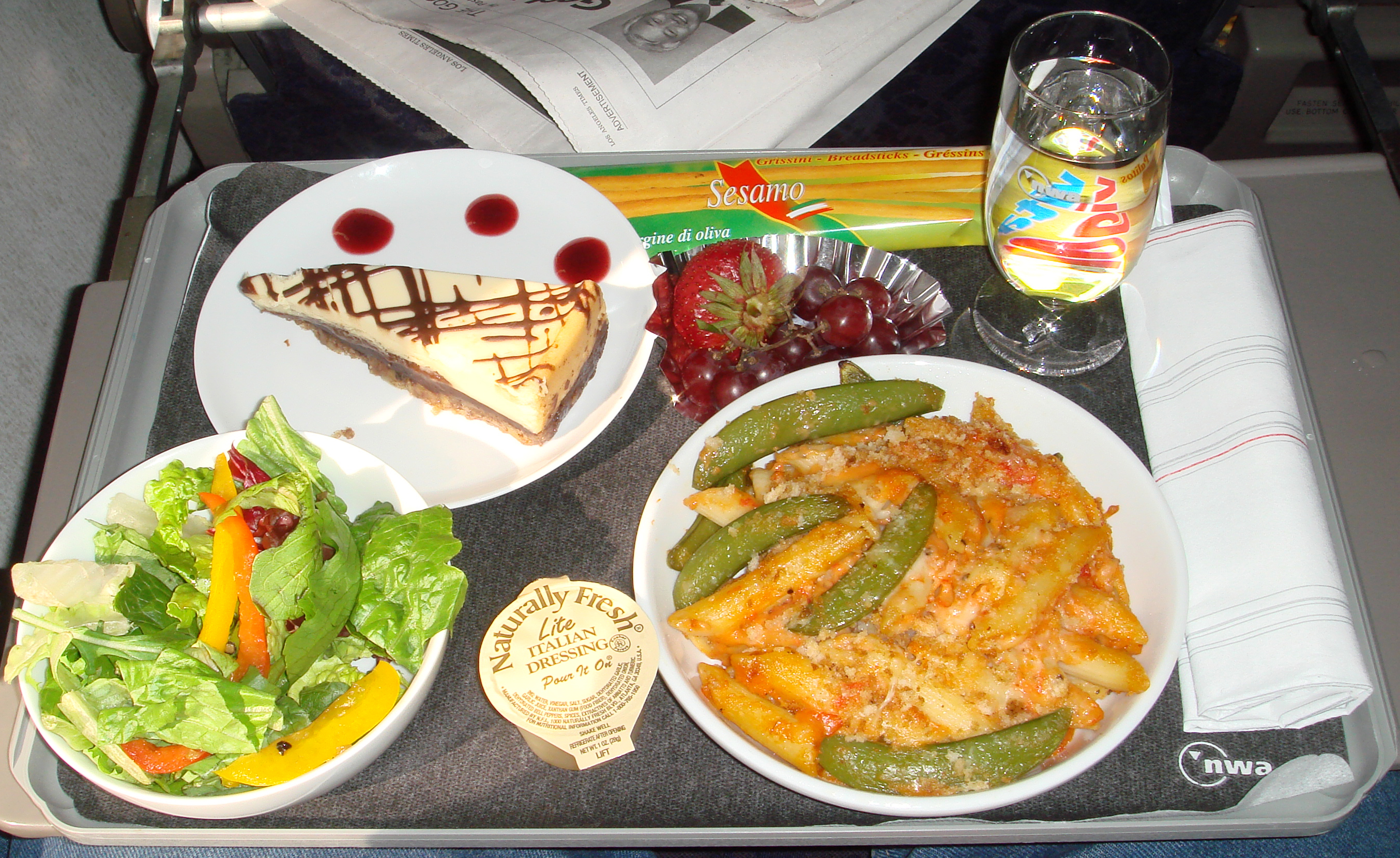
Typical dinner served in Domestic First Class (2008)

First Class was offered on all mainline narrowbody aircraft, as well as CRJ900 Northwest Airlink flights operated by Mesaba Airlines and Embraer 175 flights operated by Compass Airlines. Seats ranged from 19.5 to 21.5 inches wide, and had between 34 and 37 inches of pitch. Passengers aboard this class received complimentary meals, refreshments, and alcoholic beverages.

=== International Economy Class ===
Economy Class was offered on all widebody aircraft. Seats ranged from 17 to 17.5 inches wide, and had between 31 and 34 inches of pitch. Passengers aboard this class received free meals, snacks, and non-alcoholic beverages. Beer and wine were complimentary on international flights with complimentary meals, other alcoholic beverages could be purchased for a fee.

Passengers aboard Airbus A330 aircraft also had an Audio-Video-On-Demand (AVOD) system located in the seatback in front of them, and passengers seated in rows 10–23 (A330-200) or rows 10–28 (A330-300) had a universal power-port located below their seat.

=== Domestic Economy Class ===
Economy Class was offered on all narrowbody aircraft. Seats ranged from 17 to 17.5 inches wide and had between 30 and 34 inches of pitch, the same as on international economy class. Passengers aboard this class received free refreshments. In latter years in lieu of complimentary prepared meals, snack boxes, sandwiches (on select flights), and light snacks were available for purchase as part of a buy on board program. Alcoholic beverages were also sold.

Before 2008, Northwest Airlines was the only major U.S. airline (aside from low-cost, short-haul Southwest Airlines, Allegiant Air and Spirit Airlines) to not offer any in-flight entertainment within North America (including Alaska). Although several of the airline's domestic aircraft were originally equipped with in-flight entertainment systems, these were removed in 2005 to cut costs. US Airways implemented a similar initiative in 2008. On flights between Honolulu International Airport and Minneapolis-Saint Paul International Airport, passengers experienced the same cabin as International Economy Class aboard Airbus A330 aircraft.

== WorldPerks ==

Northwest Airlines' frequent-flyer program, WorldPerks, offered regular travelers the ability to obtain free tickets, First Class upgrades on flights, discounted membership for its airport lounges (WorldClubs), or other types of rewards. Customers could accumulate miles from actual flight segments flown or through Northwest's partners, such as car rental companies, hotels, credit cards, and other vendors. WorldPerks' elite tiers were Silver Elite, Gold Elite, and Platinum Elite which allowed for more mileage bonuses, priority waitlists and standby, and other benefits. Over the years, some details of the program changed, such as introducing capacity-controlled awards (only a certain number of seats allocated for free travel), expiration of account after three years of inactivity, a requirement of a Saturday-night stay for domestic coach awards, waiving of capacity controls for awards but requiring double the number of miles for redemption, and adding several partner airlines for mileage accumulation and award redemption. The original name of the WorldPerks program was the Northwest Orient Airlines Free Flight Plan, which began in 1981. The original program used paper coupons and gave credit for flight segments. Upon renaming the program to "WorldPerks" in 1986, a mileage-based system was used.

In addition to its Northwest Airlink and SkyTeam alliance partnerships, Northwest offered frequent flyer partnerships with the following airlines:

- Air Tahiti Nui
- Alaska Airlines
- American Eagle (California routes only)
- Cebu Pacific (temporarily suspended)
- China Airlines
- China Eastern Airlines
- Continental Airlines
  (discontinued after Continental left SkyTeam on October 24, 2009)
- Garuda Indonesia
- Gulfstream International Airlines
- Hawaiian Airlines
  (inter-island and international routes only)
- Horizon Air
- Japan Airlines
- Jet Airways
- Kingfisher Airlines
- Kenya Airways
- Malaysia Airlines
- Malév Hungarian Airlines
- Midwest Airlines
- Thai AirAsia (WorldPerks Asia only)

Northwest also offered frequent flyer partnerships with the following car rental agencies:

- Alamo Rent A Car
- Avis Rent A Car
- Budget Rent A Car
- Dollar Rent A Car
- Hertz Rent A Car
- National Car Rental
- Thrifty Car Rental

== WorldClubs ==

WorldClubs was Northwest's member lounge. Members had reciprocal access to a number of other clubs, including fellow SkyTeam carriers such as KLM, Delta Air Lines and Air France. Northwest also had partnerships with various other airline lounges on an airport-by-airport basis. Unlike some other airline lounges, WorldClubs offered free alcoholic beverages in domestic locations and Tokyo-Narita. Northwest also offered free Wi-Fi internet access worldwide at some point.

=== Locations ===
The following airports had Northwest Airlines WorldClub locations:

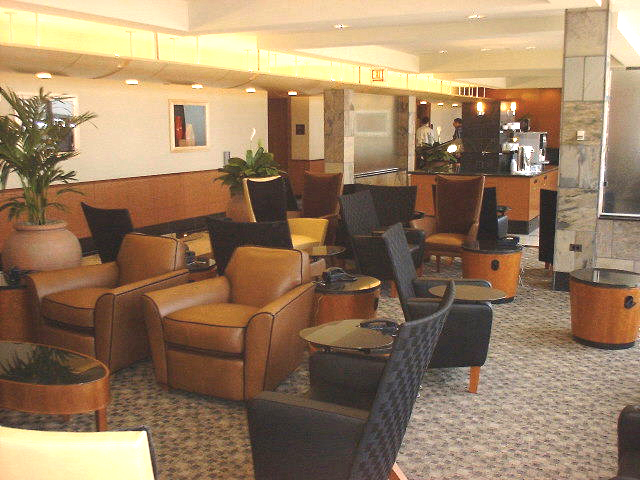
Northwest WorldClub Chicago O'Hare International Airport Terminal 2

- Boston
- Chicago O'Hare
- Cleveland
- Detroit (4)
- Honolulu
- London (Heathrow)
  (SkyTeam Lounge)
- Los Angeles
- Manila
- Memphis
- Milwaukee
- Minneapolis-St. Paul (2)
- Newark
- New York (LaGuardia)
- Portland, OR
- San Francisco
- Seattle/Tacoma
- Tokyo (Narita) (2)
- Washington (Dulles)
- Washington (Reagan)

== Incidents and accidents ==
=== Fatal accidents ===
The following are major incidents and accidents that occurred on Northwest's mainline aircraft.

Northwest Airlines reported incidents
Flight	Date	Aircraft	Location	Description	Casualties				
Flight	Date	Aircraft	Location	Description	Fatal	Serious	Minor	Uninjured	Ground
2	January 10, 1938	Lockheed; Model 14	Bozeman, Montana	Crashed in the Bridger Mountains, 12 mi (19 km) northeast of Bozeman, Montana. This was the airline's first fatal crash. Three other Lockheed Model 14 aircraft belonging to Northwest crashed over the next thirteen months.	10				
5	October 30, 1941	Douglas DC-3	Moorhead, Minnesota	The plane crashed in fog and mist due to icing on the wings. Fourteen of the fifteen passengers were killed in the crash. The pilot, Clarence Bates, was thrown clear of the wreckage and was the lone survivor.	14		1		
4422	March 12, 1948	Douglas DC-4	Mount Sanford, Alaska	Flight 4422 was a military charter en route back to the US from Shanghai, China, and had just refueled at Merrill Field, in Anchorage, Alaska, before continuing on toward LaGuardia Airport where the flight was to be concluded. The aircraft veered 23 miles off course and struck a mountain during a snowstorm. The snowstorms quickly buried the aircraft in a mountain glacier.	30				
421	August 29, 1948	Martin 202	Winona, Minnesota	Northwest 421 was flying a scheduled domestic route from Chicago-Minneapolis-St. Paul when it crashed about 4.1 mi (6.6 km) NW of Winona, Minnesota, after entering the leading edge of a thunderstorm. Pieces of the plane were seen falling, and the plane was found on a bluff on the east side of the Mississippi River. The cause of the crash was the fatigue of the left-wing, causing it to separate from the plane and precipitating the plunge.	37				
6427	October 27, 1948	Douglas DC-4	Edmonton, Alberta	Flight 6427 was on a special cargo trip flying Minneapolis-St. Paul–Edmonton–Anchorage (Merrill Field)–Tokyo when it crashed into a wooded area 34.4 mi (55.4 km) N of Edmonton soon after takeoff. The investigation revealed that the captain had feathered the propellers in simulation to instruct the copilot on emergency procedures. This was determined to be the primary cause of the crash.	2		3		
307	March 7, 1950	Martin 202	Minneapolis, Minnesota	Flight 307 was operating a domestically scheduled passenger flight routing Washington, DC–Detroit–Madison–Rochester–Minneapolis-St. Paul–Winnipeg crashed just before landing at Minneapolis, after deciding not to land at Rochester due to weather. The plane struck a flagpole at the National Soldiers Cemetery. The plane continued flying for another 3.8 mi (6.1 km) when the left-wing separated and fell. The plane crashed into a house, and both were engulfed in flames. The cause of the crash was determined to be the loss of visual reference to the ground due to the snow falling at the time.	13				2
2501	June 23, 1950	Douglas DC-4	Lake Michigan	Northwest 2501 was lost over Lake Michigan during a flight from New York's LaGuardia Airport to Seattle, WA. The aircraft went off radar and a widespread search was conducted. Some debris, upholstery, and human remains were found floating on the surface, but divers were unable to locate the plane's wreckage.	58				
N/A	October 13, 1950	Martin 202	Almelund, Minnesota	This flight was intended to be a training flight originating and ending at Minneapolis-St. Paul. The reversal of the right propeller during the flight caused the plane to spin out of control and crash, killing all on board.	6				
115	November 7, 1950	Martin 202	Butte, Montana	Flight 115 was flying a scheduled route of Chicago–Minneapolis/St. Paul–Billings–Great Falls–Helena–Butte–Seattle when it crashed 3.1 mi (5.0 km) E of Butte while landing. The plane crashed into the eastern slope of a ridge. The cause of the crash was improperly followed approach procedures.	21				
115	January 16, 1951	Martin 202	Reardan, Washington	Flight 115 (which was the same designation as the previous accident) was on the scheduled route of Minneapolis-St. Paul–Billings–Kalispell–Spokane–Wenatchee–Yakima–Seattle when it crashed about 11.9 mi (19.2 km) W of Reardan after the captain decided not to land at Wenatchee but proceed to Yakima due to weather. An emergency message from the plane was heard briefly 15 seconds after the clearance was given. The cause of the crash is not known.	10				
324	January 19, 1952	Douglas C-54	Sandspit, British Columbia	Flight 324 was flying a nonscheduled flight originating in Tokyo, ending at McChord Air Force Base with intermediate stops in Shemya and Anchorage (Elmendorf Air Force Base). While opposite Sitka, Alaska, the No. 1 propeller was feathered by the captain, who requested a diversion to Sandspit. As the plane was landing, it touched down about a third of the way down the runway; at around the midpoint, power was applied and the plane took off, but it stalled due to the steep climb and plunged into the water at the end of the runway. The cause of the crash was the icing that prevented the pilot from retracting the nose gear.	36	7			
2	April 2, 1956	Boeing Stratocruiser	Puget Sound, Washington	Flight 2 crashed after takeoff from Seattle-Tacoma International Airport on a flight to Portland, Oregon, Chicago and New York City. The pilots ditched the aircraft into Puget Sound, 5.4 mi (8.7 km) off Seattle.	5		2	31	
710	March 17, 1960	Lockheed L-188 Electra	Cannelton, Indiana	Flight 710 was en route to Miami from Chicago when the aircraft lost a wing at approximately 18,000 feet near Tell City, Indiana.	63				
1–11	July 14, 1960	Douglas DC-7	Pacific Ocean near Manila, Philippines	Northwest 1–11 was flying from New York City to Manila, Philippines, with stops in Seattle, Anchorage (Cold Bay), Tokyo, and Okinawa. The plane was on its final leg between Okinawa and Manila when the No. 2 engine experienced power loss. The propeller then separated from the plane and hit the fuselage, slashing a 15-inch hole. The pilot decided to ditch the plane in the Pacific Ocean about 77.5 mi (124.7 km) NE of Manila. Upon impact, the rear of the plane separated as well as the engines and right-wing. The majority of the survivors used the right-wing, which floated for three hours, as a life raft until rescue came.	1		58		
104	October 28, 1960	Douglas C-54	Missoula, Montana	Flight 104 was flying from Spokane to Missoula when it crashed about 20 miles (30 km) W of Missoula in the Clark Fork Valley. The plane was seen making a steep left banking turn with nose up; the plane continued rolling and crashed inverted. The crash was attributed to pilot error.	12				
706	September 16, 1961	Lockheed L-188 Electra	Chicago, Illinois	Flight 706 was on a routine flight from Milwaukee to Miami, with stops in Chicago, Tampa, and Ft. Lauderdale. While departing from Chicago, the plane banked to the right and gradually descended until hitting the ground. The cause of the crash was mechanical failure of the ailerons.	37				
705	February 12, 1963	Boeing 720	Florida Everglades	Flight 705, flying from Miami to Chicago crashed in the Florida Everglades approximately 37 miles (60 km) SW of Miami International Airport while diverting to avoid bad weather. The cause of the crash was an unrecoverable loss of control due to severe turbulence.	43				
293	June 3, 1963	Douglas DC-7	Pacific Ocean near Annette Island, Alaska	Flight 293 was flying a Military Air Transport Service (MATS) flight from McChord Air Force Base outside Tacoma, Washington, to Elmendorf Air Force Base outside Anchorage, Alaska. While in flight, contact was lost. Floating debris from the plane was located 182.5 mi (293.7 km) WSW of Annette Island. The cause of the crash was never determined.	101				
6231	December 1, 1974	Boeing 727	Stony Point, New York	Flight 6231 was flying on a ferry flight from John F. Kennedy International Airport to Buffalo when it crashed in the vicinity of Stony Point. As the plane was cleared to climb, the airspeed and rate of climb increased, until the plane stalled and descended out of control into a wooded area. The cause of the crash was loss of control because "the flight crew failed to realize and correct the aircraft's high-angle-of-attack, low-speed stall and descending spiral".	3				
608	January 20, 1983	Boeing 727	Portland, Oregon	Flight 608 was en route from Seattle, Washington, to Portland, Oregon, when it was hijacked. The man informed a flight attendant that he had a bomb and demanded to be taken to Afghanistan. Landing in Portland to refuel, the hijacker negotiated with airport authorities. Federal agents stormed the aircraft. The hijacker threw the box he claimed had a bomb at the agents, who shot and killed him. The box contained no explosives.	1			40	
255	August 16, 1987	McDonnell-Douglas MD-82	Romulus, Michigan	Flight 255 crashed on takeoff from Detroit Metropolitan Wayne County Airport. All but one aboard the MD-82 died. The cause of the crash was attempted takeoff with the wrong configuration due to pilot mismanagement of the aircraft.	154	1			2
1482	December 3, 1990	Douglas DC-9	Romulus, Michigan	Flight 1482, a DC-9-14 departing for Pittsburgh collided with Flight 299, a Boeing 727-200, departing for Memphis at Detroit Metropolitan Wayne County Airport near the intersection of runways 09/27 and 03C/21C in dense fog. The 727 had begun its takeoff roll, and the DC-9 had just taxied onto the active runway. None of the 146 passengers and 10 crew members aboard the 727 were injured, but the DC-9 sustained serious damage.	8	10	26		
299	December 3, 1990	Boeing 727	Romulus, Michigan	Involved in collision with Flight 1482 detailed in the previous line.				156	
Total casualties					Fatal	Serious	Minor	Uninjured	Ground
(20 incidents)					620	18	89	187	4

=== Non-fatal accidents and incidents ===
- October 22, 1962: A DC-7 with 7 crew and 95 passengers made a successful water landing in Sitka Sound. The military charter flight was en route to Elmendorf Air Force Base from McChord Air Force Base and, prior to the ditching at just before 1 p.m. local time, the crew had been struggling with a propeller problem for about 45 minutes. The plane stayed afloat for 24 minutes after coming to rest in the water, giving the occupants ample time to evacuate into life-rafts. Only 6 minor injuries were reported; all passengers and crew were quickly rescued by U.S. Coast Guard ships. The accident report called the ditching "an outstanding feat", citing several key factors in this water landing's success: pilots' skill, ideal conditions (calm seas, favorable weather, daylight), time to prepare for the ditching and the military passengers' ease with following orders. Pilots who flew over the scene also praised the Northwest crew, calling it the "...finest ditching they had ever seen..." .
- July 1, 1968: Northwest Airlines Flight 714 was hijacked to Cuba.
- January 22, 1971: Northwest Airlines Flight 433 was hijacked en route from Milwaukee to Detroit, Michigan. The hijacker demanded to be taken to Algeria but the plane landed in Cuba instead.
- November 24, 1971: Northwest Airlines Flight 305, en route from Portland International Airport to Seattle–Tacoma International Airport, was hijacked by D. B. Cooper. After receiving a $200,000 ransom payment and four parachutes in Seattle, he ordered the crew to fly to Mexico, and he jumped from the aft airstairs of the Boeing 727-051 while it was in flight over Washington. The aircraft later landed safely in Reno, Nevada, but Cooper's fate remains unknown.
- May 8, 1977: Northwest Orient Airlines Flight 22, a Boeing 747 en route from Tokyo to Honolulu, was hijacked by a passenger who held a razor to a flight attendant's throat and demanded to be flown to Moscow. The flight's purser subdued the hijacker with a fire ax. The flight returned to Tokyo so the hijacker's injuries could be treated; no other injuries were reported.
- January 4, 1990: The right-hand engine fell off of Northwest Airlines Flight 5, Boeing 727 registration N2280, en route from Miami to Minneapolis with 145 passengers and crew. The pilots heard a loud bang; noticing that the aircraft had lost power but not realizing why, they made a safe emergency landing in Tampa, at which point they discovered that the engine was missing. It was found the next day in a field near Madison, Florida. The accident was attributed to lavatory seals in the forward fuselage that had been improperly installed by airline technicians; when the cabin was pressurized, lavatory fluid was forced through the seals and ingested by the engine, damaging the compressor blades.
- March 8, 1990: A Northwest Airlines Boeing 727 carrying 91 passengers flew from Fargo, North Dakota, to Minneapolis with both pilots and the flight engineer drunk. All three men were subsequently fired and had their licenses revoked by the FAA.
- January 2, 1999: (-Jan 3) due to bad weather and blizzards passengers were stranded on aircraft at Detroit for periods up to 8½ hours. An official inquiry found "... [the delays] were serious and indicate that this event had important implications for passenger safety. Moreover, even if the well being of passengers had not been an issue, the review team believes that the stranding of passengers on aircraft queued on taxiways for up to 8½ hours invites more serious problems and is simply unacceptable. None of the other airlines serving Detroit experienced ground delays approaching the magnitude of Northwest's delays." Subsequently, passengers brought various legal claims against the carrier including false imprisonment and negligence and obtained a $7.1 million settlement.
- March 17, 2001: Northwest Airlines Flight 985, an Airbus A320 registered N357NW with 144 passengers and 6 crew, was taking off from runway 3C at Detroit Metropolitan Wayne County Airport when the nose lifted off the runway prematurely without control input from the pilots. The captain applied forward control stick to push the nose back down, but it lifted off again when he released stick pressure. Fearing that the plane might be uncontrollable in flight, the captain initiated a rejected takeoff, but the plane briefly became airborne, sustained a hard landing and a tailstrike, and overran the runway, coming to rest in a muddy field 400 ft (120 m) past the threshold. Three passengers reported minor injuries from the accident and ensuing emergency evacuation. The accident was attributed to pilot-induced oscillations during the takeoff and the delay in aborting the takeoff; contributing factors were incorrect trim tab settings by the first officer, which the captain failed to notice during preflight checks, and a wet runway.
- October 9, 2002: Northwest Airlines Flight 85, a Boeing 747-400, experienced a lower rudder hardover during cruise. The crew declared an emergency and diverted the airplane to Ted Stevens International Airport in Anchorage, Alaska.
- June 19, 2004: pilots mistakenly landed at Ellsworth AFB instead of the nearby Rapid City airport. Passengers aboard were asked to close their window shades by US Air Force security personnel.
- May 10, 2005: a Northwest Airlines DC-9 collided on the ground with a Northwest Airlines Airbus A319 that had just pushed back from the gate at Minneapolis-Saint Paul International Airport. The DC-9 suffered a malfunction in one of its hydraulic systems in flight. After landing, the captain shut down one of the plane's engines, inadvertently disabling the remaining working hydraulic system. Six people were injured and both planes were substantially damaged. The Airbus A319 was later repaired and is currently in service with Delta Air Lines as of December 2022. The DC-9, however, was written off.
- June 19, 2005: at 0435 in the morning Tehran local time, Northwest Airlines Flight 41, Ship No. 1243, operating from Mumbai to Amsterdam made an emergency landing at the Mehrabad International Airport in Tehran, Iran. It was the first American air carrier to land in Iran in 26 years, since the Iranian Revolution in 1979.
- August 19, 2005: a Northwest Airlines 747-200, registration N627US, operating flight NW74 from Tokyo Narita Airport landed at Guam International Airport without its nose gear fully extended. The nose of aircraft made full contact with the runway. Smoke was reported on board and all passengers and crew were evacuated, with only two minor injuries reported.
- On January 21, 2007, a Northwest Airlines DC-9, Northwest Airlines Flight 1726 skidded 400 feet (120 m) off the end of a snowy runway at Milwaukee International Airport. The accident was due to an explosion in one of the engines, forcing the pilot to abort takeoff. The aircraft was headed for Detroit Metropolitan Wayne County Airport and was to continue on to Buffalo Niagara International Airport. Amongst the 104 people aboard, only one back injury was reported.
- October 20, 2007: Northwest Airlines Flight 1432 executed an emergency landing at Hector International Airport in Fargo, North Dakota because the nose wheels had jammed in an abnormal position. There were no injuries on board.
- February 20, 2009: Northwest Airlines Flight 2, a Boeing 747-400 flying from Ninoy Aquino International Airport in Manila, Philippines, to Narita International Airport near Tokyo, Japan, experienced severe turbulence when descending to Narita. The aircraft, with 408 passengers and 14 crew members aboard, landed safely; however, 50 people were injured; around five were hospitalized.
- May 4, 2009: An Airbus A320-211, registration N311US, operated by Northwest Airlines as flight NW557, experienced a tailstrike resulting in substantial damage upon landing on runway 16L at Denver International Airport, Colorado (DEN). The flight was a regularly scheduled passenger flight which departed from Minneapolis-St. Paul Airport, Minnesota (MSP) at 11:39.
- October 21, 2009: Northwest Airlines Flight 188, an Airbus A320, flying from San Diego International Airport to Minneapolis-St Paul International Airport overflew the Minneapolis airport and continued to fly off course by 150 miles, leaving air traffic control to believe that the flight had been hijacked. The pilots originally stated that they were in an argument regarding airline policy and did not notice that they had flown off course, but later admitted to using their personal laptop computers at the time. The pilots contacted air traffic control after they realized their mistake and the flight arrived safely in Minneapolis about one hour late. The pilots' commercial flying licenses were subsequently revoked by the FAA.
- December 25, 2009: a Nigerian al Qaeda member tried to detonate plastic explosives on Northwest Airlines Flight 253, an Airbus A330 from Amsterdam to Detroit, as the plane was landing in Detroit. The device failed to detonate properly, and the suspect suffered third degree burns. Two other passengers incurred minor injuries. The White House said it considered it an attempted terrorist attack.

== See also ==
- List of defunct airlines of the United States
- Professional Flight Attendants Association

== Bibliography ==
- Wigton, D.C. (1963). From Jenny to jet. Los Angeles (CA.): Floyd Clymer Publications.
- Mills, S.E. (1980). A pictorial history of Northwest Airlines. New York (N.Y.): Crown Publishers Inc. “Bonanza Books”.
- Lane, D.R. (1985). Aircraft in Northwest Airlines history. private issue.
- Yenne, B. (1986). Northwest Orient. London: Bison Books Ltd.
- Ruble, K.D. (1986). Flight to the top-How a hometown airline Mmde history and keeps on making it: The absorbing sixty-year story of Northwest Airlines. New York: Viking Press.
- Szurovy, G. (2003). Classic American airlines. St. Paul (MN): Motorbooks International/MBI Publishing Co.
- Jones, G. (2005). Northwest Airlines-The first 80 years. Arcadia Publishing.
- Johnson, R.L. (2007). Voices from the sky-Little known and long forgotten stories about Northwest Airlines’ earlier years. NWA History Centre.
- El-Hai, Jack (2013). Non-stop-A turbulent history of Northwest Airlines. University of Minnesota Press.
