= Aircraft Mechanics Fraternal Association =

North American trade union

- Abbreviation: AMFA
- Formation: 1962
- Type: Trade union
- Headquarters: Centennial, Colorado, US
- Locations: United States; Canada
- Members: 3,900
- President: Bret Oestreich
- Website: amfanational.org

The Aircraft Mechanics Fraternal Association (AMFA) is an independent craft union representing aircraft maintenance technicians and related employees (ground equipment technicians, maintenance controllers, plant maintenance technicians, facilities maintenance technicians, appearance technicians, maintenance instructors) in the United States and Canada. AMFA is committed to the principles of craft unionism. It only seeks to represent aircraft maintenance technicians and related employees, a "craft or class" recognized by the National Mediation Board under the Railway Labor Act applied to airlines. It believes that three characteristics in particular separate AMFA from all other unions: first, direct member control over their local and the finances of it; second, a democratic process where officers are elected instead of appointed, and those same officers can be recalled by the membership; and third, open negotiations where members are invited to attend and participate in collective bargaining sessions. These three things allow the AMFA membership to effectively maintain control over their union.

AMFA was created in 1962 by technicians, most notably its founder O. V. Delle-Femine, but did not represent any carrier until 1964, when it won recognition at Ozark Airlines. Later, AMFA won bargaining rights at Alaska Airlines, ATA Airlines, Independence Air, Northwest Airlines and Southwest Airlines.

Its national headquarters is located in Aurora, Colorado.

== Structure ==
Local officers and representatives are elected by the local membership to serve two-year terms and can be recalled by the membership. A petition signed by 25 percent of the members begins the recall procedure.

The National Office advocates for the craft and assists the Locals throughout the system. The National Executive Council hires professionals to provide CPA accounting and legal representation. National officers oversee these professionals and report to the membership. Candidates for national office need the endorsement of only one Local to have his or her name placed on the ballot. National officers serve four-year terms, and are subject to the same recall procedures as local officials.

=== Locals ===
- Local 4-MDW
- Local 11-DAL
- Local 14-SEA
- Local 18-HOU
- Local 32-PHX
