= Professional Flight Attendants Association =

The Professional Flight Attendants Association (PFAA) was an independent union which represented the approximately 10,000 flight attendants employed by Northwest Airlines in North America. PFAA had been the bargaining agent for Northwest flight attendants from June 2003, when its members voted to end their 26-year association with the International Brotherhood of Teamsters, until the membership voted to be represented by the Association of Flight Attendants in July 2006.

The independent union came to power on a platform of internal, democratic control of union affairs as opposed to top-down centralized power of large labor groups.

PFAA's standing increased dramatically in August 2005 with the implementation of "dues check-off," which automatically deducts a flight attendant's union dues from each paycheck. For two years prior to that date, individual flight attendants were responsible for submitting dues to the union, and hundreds of members remained in arrears.

The union continued to be controversial with rank-and-file members, with various factions supporting a return to the International Brotherhood of Teamsters or a change to other unions affiliated with a larger labor coalition, like the Association of Flight Attendants, or a redoubled effort to increase solidarity behind the independent PFAA. Both the Association of Flight Attendants and the Transport Workers Union of America conducted organizational campaigns for the membership.

In addition to doing battle with other unions seeking to represent its members, the PFAA fought with Northwest Airlines management who, under bankruptcy protection, were seeking to dissolve the flight attendants' collective bargaining agreement.

In November 2005 the PFAA agreed to temporary concessions which reduced the average flight attendant's hourly pay by approximately 21% and total compensation by approximately 30%. The company proposed additional cost-cutting measures which would outsource to foreign nationals up a third of the flight attendant positions and dramatically reduce the compensation and benefits of those who remain.

Evidence of the labor turmoil at the airline was seen in December 2005 when over 500 attendants applied for 160 one-year layoffs. Many employees are reluctant to permanently sever their ties to the company as pay and benefits accrue on the basis of seniority. Nearly half of Northwest flight attendants had more than 15 years of service to the company, and nearly three-fourths were over the age of 40.

On July 6 Northwest flight attendants elected the Association of Flight Attendants-CWA as their new bargaining representative. AFA-CWA received 4,349 votes. The total vote exceeded the Railway Labor Act requirement that 50 percent plus one of eligible flight attendants vote in the election in order to change representation.
