= American Flyers Airline Flight 280/D =

1966 aviation accident

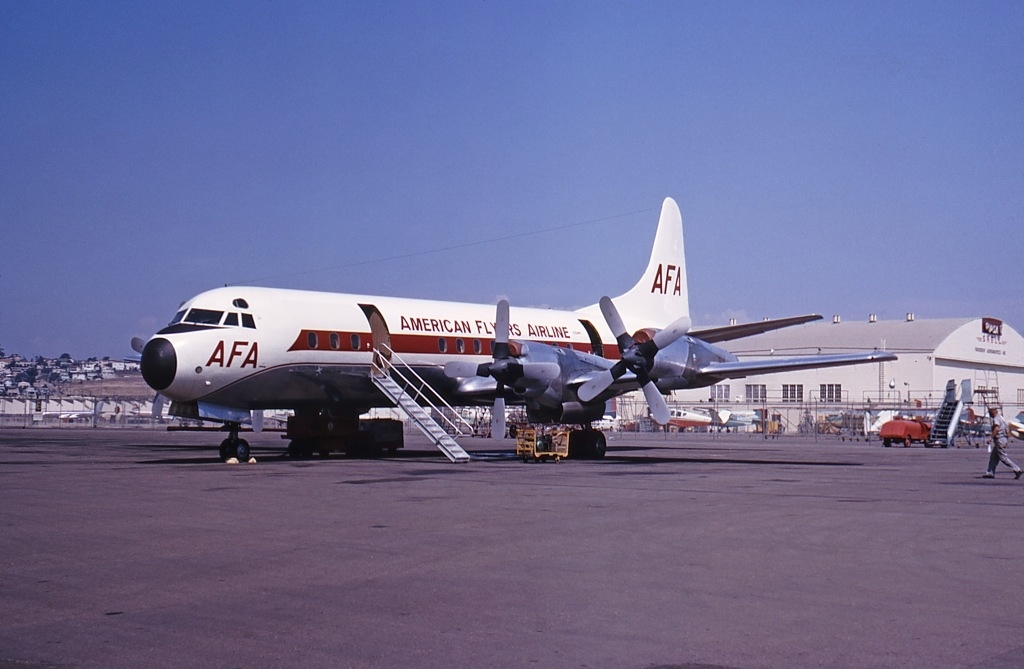
- An American Flyers L-188, similar to the one involved at Lindbergh Field in 1963.

Accident
- Date: April 22, 1966
- Summary: Pilot incapacitation
- Site: 2.4 km northeast of Ardmore Municipal Airport, United States; 34.3294°N 96.9819°W

Aircraft
- Aircraft type: Lockheed L-188C Electra
- Operator: American Flyers Airline
- Registration: N183H
- Flight origin: Monterey Regional Airport
- Stopover: Ardmore Municipal Airport
- Destination: Columbus Airport
- Occupants: 98
- Passengers: 93
- Crew: 5
- Fatalities: 83
- Injuries: 15
- Survivors: 15

American Flyers Airline Flight 280/D was a flight operated on a U.S. Military Air Command contract from Monterey Regional Airport in California to Columbus Airport in Georgia, via Ardmore Municipal Airport, Oklahoma. On April 22, 1966, while approaching Runway 8 at Ardmore, the aircraft overshot the runway and crashed into a hill, bursting into flames. Eighty-three of the 98 passengers and crew on board died as a result of the accident making it the deadliest to have occurred in Oklahoma.

== Aircraft ==
The aircraft was a Lockheed L-188 Electra four-engined turboprop airline registered as N183H. It had first flown in January 1961 and was bought by American Flyers Airline in January 1963. It is the same plane that carried the Beatles from city to city in 1964 during their second tour of the U.S.

== Investigation ==
The U.S. Civil Aeronautics Board (CAB) investigated the accident.

Investigators found no evidence of mechanical failure or defect related to the accident, although the flight data recorder had suffered a mechanical failure unrelated to the accident and may not have been properly checked by the flight engineer before the flight; it had produced no recording for the flight. The airplane did not have (and was not required to have) a cockpit voice recorder.

Some days after the crash, it was learned that the pilot, Reed Pigman, who also happened to be the president of American Flyers, was under care for arteriosclerosis. An autopsy of Pigman determined his cause of death to either be multiple injuries or coronary artery sclerosis.

It was also determined that Reed Pigman had falsified his application for a first-class medical certificate. He had not disclosed that he was diabetic or that he had a history of heart issues dating back almost two decades; either of these would have been disqualifying factors for the certificate.

On March 28, 1967, the CAB published its final report. The CAB determined that the probable cause for the accident was:

[T]he incapacitation, due to a coronary insufficiency, of the pilot-in-command at a critical point during visual, circling approach being conducted under instrument flight conditions.

== See also ==
- List of unrecovered and unusable flight recorders
