= Roxas Airport =

Airport in Capiz, Philippines

Roxas Airport Hulugpaan sang Roxas Paliparan ng Roxas
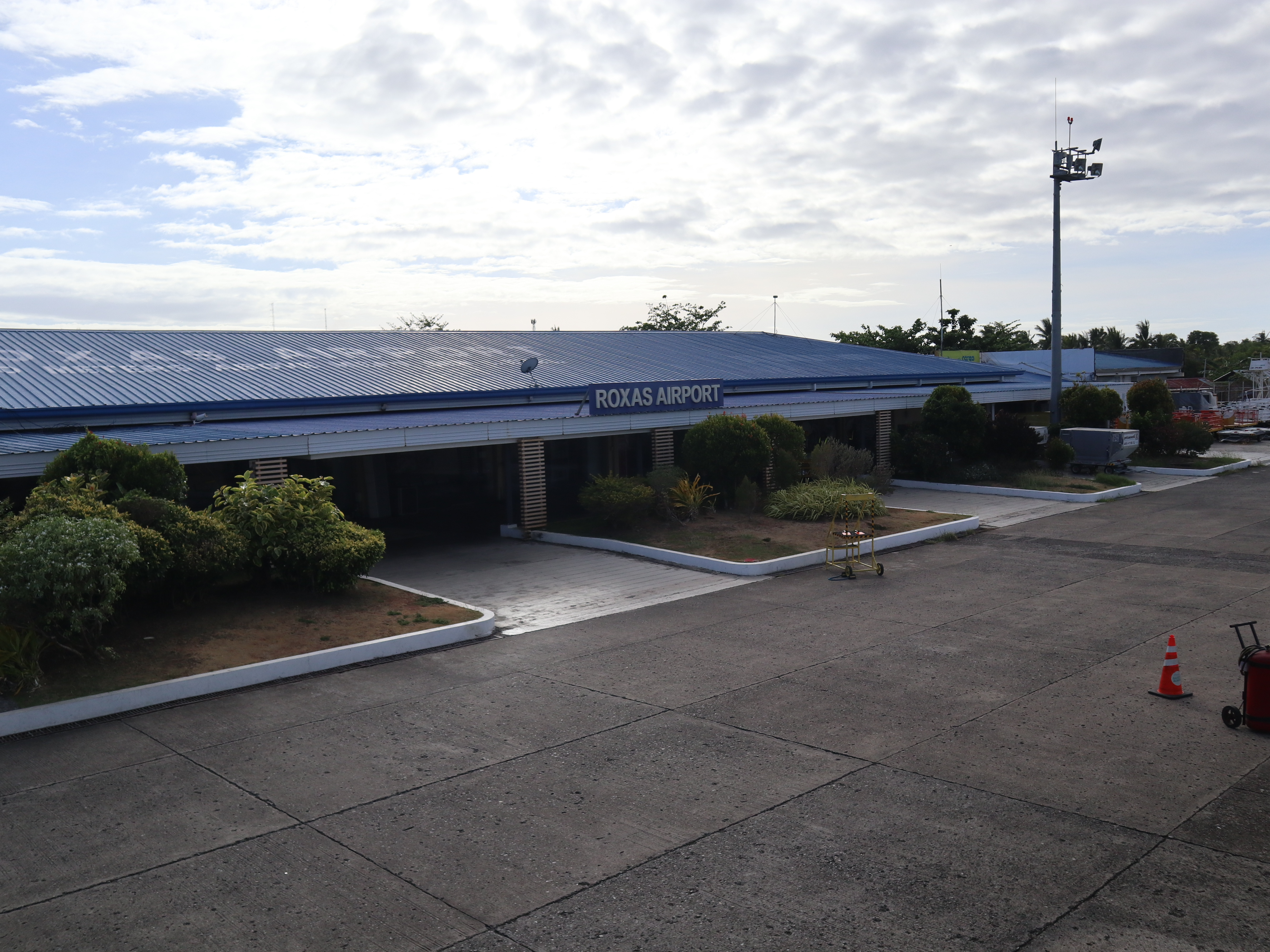
- Terminal exterior in April 2024
- IATA: RXS; ICAO: RPVR; WMO: 98538

Summary
- Airport type: Public
- Owner/Operator: Civil Aviation Authority of the Philippines
- Serves: Roxas City
- Location: Barangays Baybay, Gabu-an and Mongpong
- Opened: 1957; 69 years ago
- Elevation AMSL: 3 m (9.8 ft)
- Coordinates: 11°35′52″N 122°45′6″E

Map
- Location within Visayas Location within Philippines

Runways
Direction	Length		Surface
Direction	m	ft	Surface
14/32	1,893	6,211	concrete

Statistics (2023)
- Passengers: 404,463
- Aircraft movements: 2,744
- Cargo (in kgs): 2,405,708
- Source: CAAP

Roxas Airport (IATA: RXS, ICAO: RPVR) is a domestic airport serving the general area of Roxas City and the province of Capiz, in the Philippines. The airport is classified as a Class 1 principal airport, by the Civil Aviation Authority of the Philippines, a body of the Department of Transportation that is responsible for the operations of most minor and domestic airports serving various parts of the country.

== History ==
Roxas Airport began operations on a dirt track in Barangay Loctugan in the year 1947. National flag carrier Philippine Airlines was the first to serve it. In 1951, then-incumbent Philippine president Elpidio Quirino visited the province using this airport to inaugurate Roxas City as a charted city. Later, former first district Congresswoman Carmen Dinglasan-Consing created an initiative for a bigger and better airport. With that, all airport operations were moved to the present site in 1957, situated in a plot of land under the jurisdictions of barangays Baybay, Gabu-An, and Mongpong. The Loctugan landing field is now the site of the Roxas City School for Philippine Craftsmen.

Two other airlines, Air Manila International and Filipinas Orient Airways, also served the airport following its relocation, each having one daily flight from Manila to Roxas. Their operations were taken over by Philippine Airlines in 1973 when the re-elected Ferdinand Marcos's Martial Law government issued Letters of Instruction nos. 151 and 151-A, both known as the one-airline policy. The airport suspended operations from March 1975 to March 1976 to allow the runway's concreting. Roxas Airport later welcomed the jet age when Philippine Airlines flew a BAC-11 on their Manila-Roxas route. Later on, the runway was extended to the current length of 1,893 meters.

With the abolition of the one airline policy during the Corazon Aquino administration, Roxas Airport welcomed other airlines, among them being Cebu Pacific, which began their services in the 1990s using DC-9's until the switch to Airbus A320's in 2006. More improvements were made to the airport in the 2000s.

In 2013, then-incumbent president Benigno Aquino III laid the foundation for the construction and expansion of Roxas Airport along with the improvement of its facilities. The airport underwent a major facelift in 2015 and in 2016, Roxas Airport installed newer and more modern runways lights and energy-efficient LED floodlighting to allow for night operations. In 2017, the airport was night rated by the Department of Transportation and the Civil Aviation Authority of the Philippines.

== Structure ==
=== Runway ===
Roxas Airport has one primary 1,893-meter (6,211 ft) runway, which runs at a direction of 14°/32°. It can support narrowbody planes, mostly to Boeing 737's, Airbus A320 family planes, and ATR aircraft, along with C-130 Hercules planes. During the 2020 COVID-19 pandemic, the airport welcomed an Airbus A321 of Philippine Airlines, which flew a relief/repatriation flight.

In 2017, modern runway lights and an Instrument Landing System were installed, making the airport capable of supporting low-visibility and night landings under any weather conditions.

=== Terminal ===
Airport runway

Roxas Airport's terminal is a one-story bungalow-type terminal. It opened in 1957 and was expanded further during the turn of the century. The west wing houses the arrivals whereas the east wing caters to departures.

The terminal features two X-ray machines, three check in counters, a children's lounge, clinic, and souvenir shops. Its gates hall can accommodate 420 passengers at a time.

In 2016, the CAAP launched the airport's free wireless Internet network, in cooperation with PLDT and Smart Communications.

=== Other structures ===
The airport has a cargo terminal that caters to both Cebu Pacific and Philippine Airlines. Additionally, the complex has a fire station equipped with two to three fire trucks, and an administrative building. It also has a has a power back-up system and a power generating station that enables the airport to run in the event of a power outage, returning the supply of electric power to the facility within three seconds.

Since mid-2024, the airport has been operating a mobile control tower as the main ATC tower undergoes rehabilitation due to structural damage.

== Airlines and destinations ==
Airlines	Destinations
Cebu Pacific	Manila
PAL Express	Manila

== Gallery ==
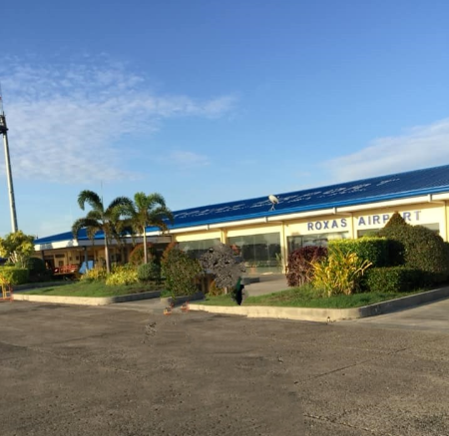
Facade of the Roxas Airport terminal from the apron

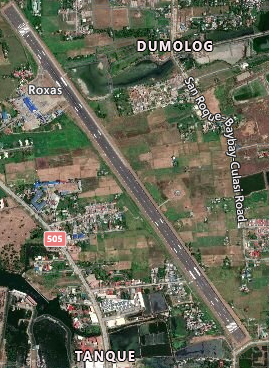
Satellite image of Roxas Airport

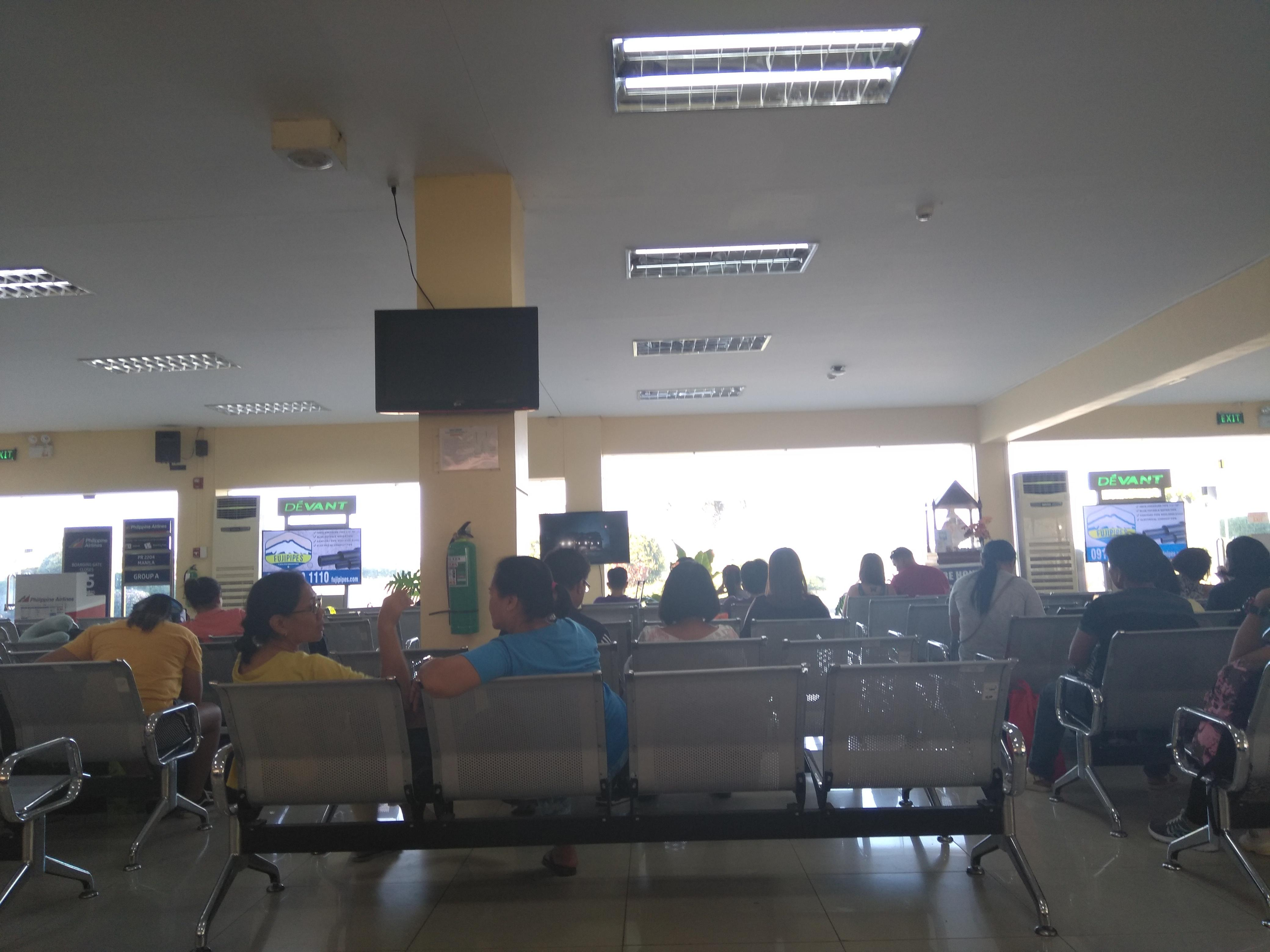
Roxas Airport terminal interior (departures)

== See also ==
- List of airports in the Philippines
