= KADM =

KADM may refer to:

- KADM-LP, a defunct low-power television station (channel 63) formerly licensed to Corpus Christi, Texas, United States
- Ardmore Municipal Airport (ICAO code KADM)
