= Flight 702 =

Flight 702 may refer to:

- Air Manila Flight 702, a Lockheed L-188 Electra which crashed on 4 June 1976, due to an engine failure and subsequent crew errors
- Air Algérie Flight 702P, a Boeing 737-100 which crashed on 21 December 1994, due to crew fatigue and crew errors
- Ethiopian Airlines Flight 702, a Boeing 767 which was hijacked to Switzerland on 17 February 2014 by the co-pilot; no one was injured and the co-pilot was arrested
