= Lockheed L-188 Electra =

American turboprop airliner, built 1957–1961

L-188 Electra
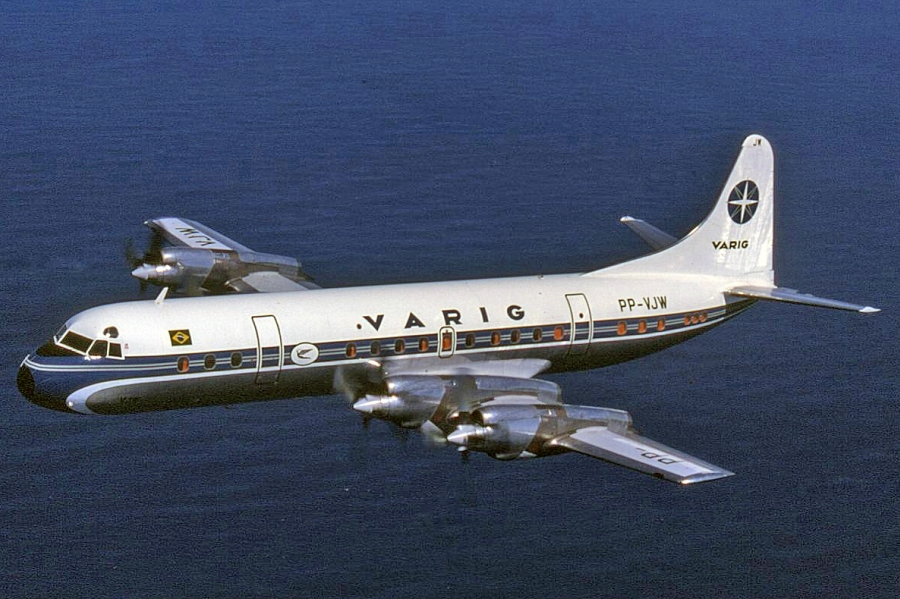
- An L-188 operated by VARIG

General information
- Type: Turboprop airliner
- National origin: United States
- Manufacturer: Lockheed Corporation
- Status: In service as a cargo aircraft
- Primary users: Air Spray; Buffalo Airways Conair Group (Retired); Eastern Air Lines (Retired); American Airlines (Retired); National Airlines (Retired)
- Number built: 170

History
- Manufactured: 1957–1961
- Introduction date: January 12, 1959, with Eastern Air Lines
- First flight: December 6, 1957
- Developed into: Lockheed P-3 Orion

The Lockheed L-188 Electra is an American turboprop airliner built by Lockheed. First flown in 1957, it was the first large turboprop airliner built in the United States. With its fairly high power-to-weight ratio, huge propellers and very short wings resulting in the majority of the wingspan being enveloped in propwash, large Fowler flaps which significantly increased effective wing area when extended, and four-engined design, the airplane had airfield performance capabilities unmatched by many jet transport aircraft even today—particularly on short runways and high altitude airfields. Initial sales were good, but after two fatal crashes that led to expensive modifications to fix a design defect, no more were ordered. Jet airliners soon supplanted turboprops for many purposes, and many Electras were modified as freighters. Some Electras are still being used in various roles into the 21st century. The airframe was also used as the basis for the Lockheed P-3 Orion maritime patrol aircraft.

== Development ==
By the mid-20th century, Lockheed had established a strong position in commercial airliner production with its piston-engined Constellation series. Further development brought turboprop engines to the Constellation airframe with the Lockheed L-1249 Super Constellation.

In 1951, Lockheed was approached by Capital Airlines to develop a new turboprop airliner, which was designated the YC-130, but no other carriers had any interest, so the design was dropped. Subsequently, Capital Airlines went on to order 60 British Vickers Viscounts. In 1954, as a result of American Airlines' interest in developing a twin-engined aircraft, the idea resurfaced and the company offered a twin-engined design now designated the CL-303. This newer design was a high-wing type and would allow for 60 to 70 passengers. This design was also shelved for lack of interest from other carriers.

The following year, American Airlines revised its requirement to a four-engine design for 75 passengers with 2,000 miles (3,200 km) range. Lockheed proposed a new design, the CL-310 with a low wing and four Rolls-Royce Darts or Napier Elands. The CL-310 design met the American Airlines requirements, but failed to meet those of another interested carrier, Eastern Air Lines. Its requirements were for a longer range, a minimum cruising speed of 350 miles per hour (560 km/h), and increased seating capacity to the 85-to-90-passenger level. Lockheed redesigned the CL-310 to use the Allison 501-D13 turboprop engine, a civilian version of the T56 developed for the Lockheed C-130 Hercules military transport. The airframe was stretched to allow for more seats and handle the increased performance. This design, led by chief design engineer Lou Storey, was launched as the Model 188 with an order for 35 by American Airlines on June 8, 1955. This was followed by Eastern Air Lines with an order for 40 on September 27, 1955. The first aircraft took 26 months to complete, and by that time Lockheed had orders for 129. The prototype, a Model 188A, first flew on December 6, 1957, two months ahead of schedule. Lockheed was awarded a type certificate by the Civil Aeronautics Administration (CAA) on 22 August 1958. The first delivery – to Eastern Air Lines – was on October 8, 1958, but it did not enter service until January 12, 1959.

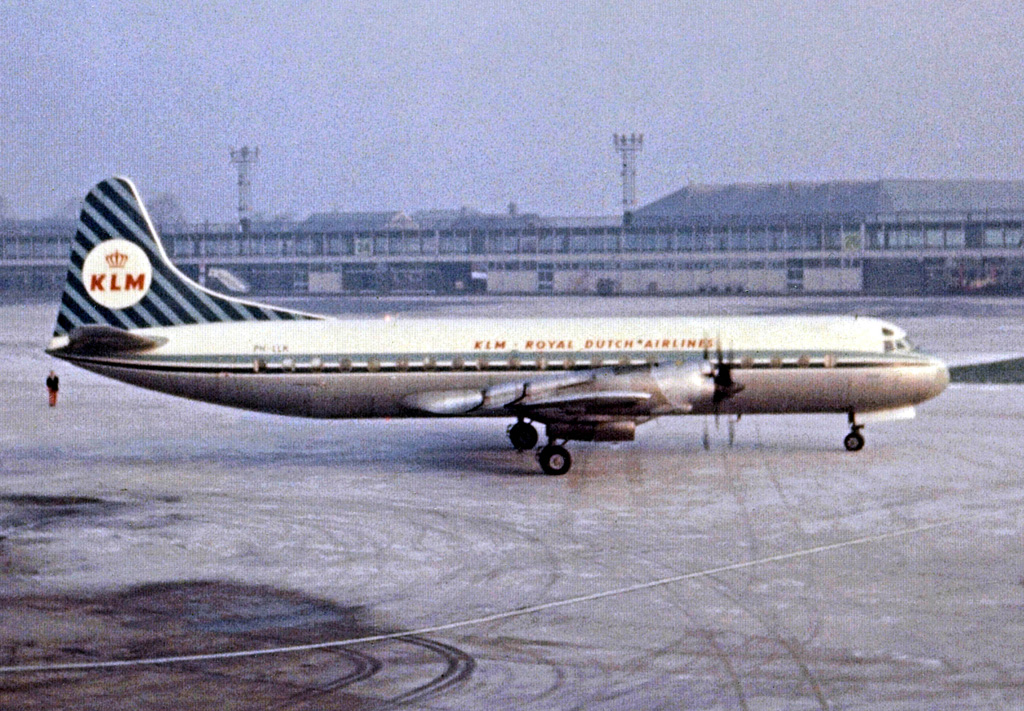
L188C Electra of KLM Royal Dutch Airlines operating a passenger service at Manchester Airport in 1963

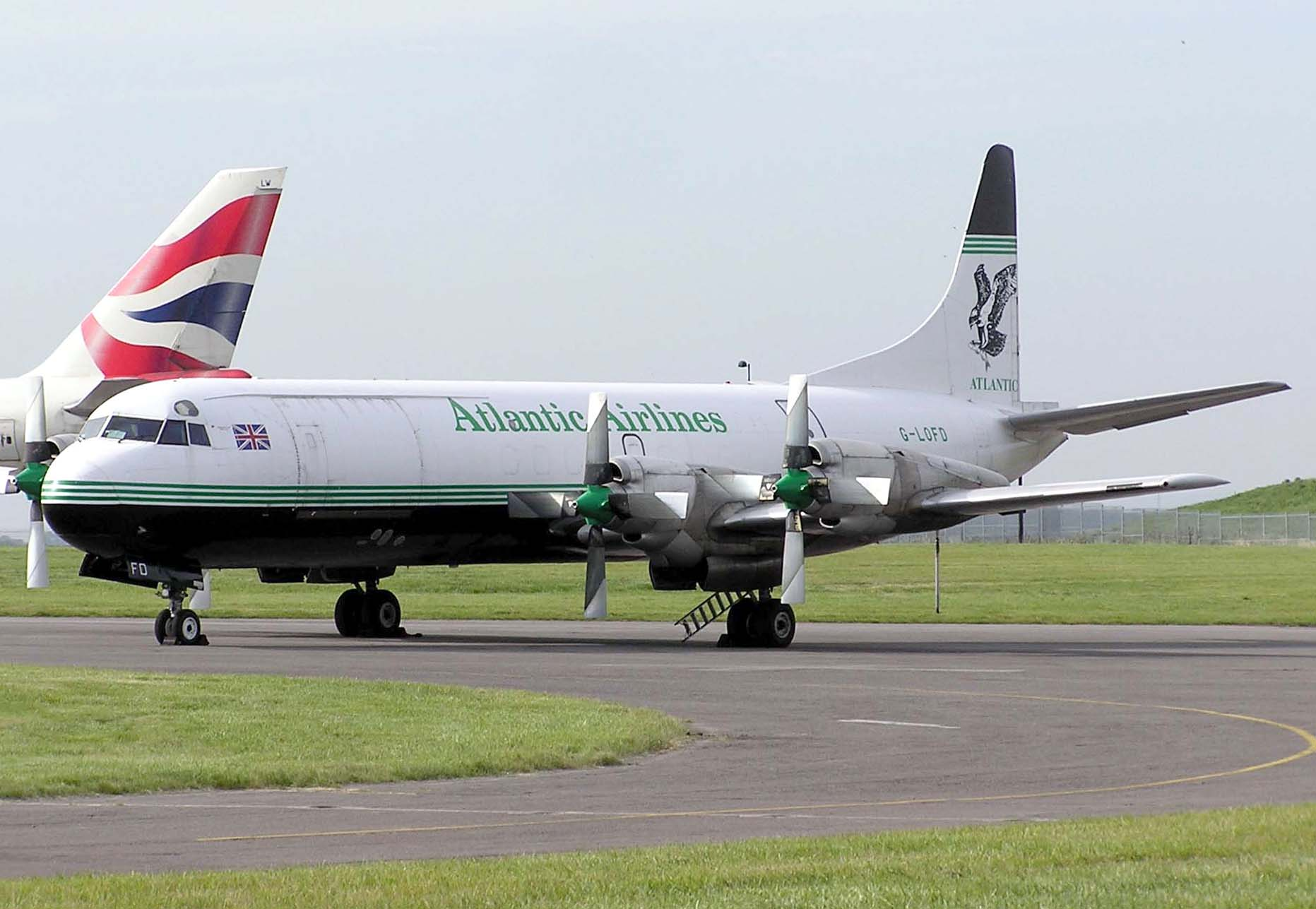
An L-188CF of Atlantic Airlines in 2004

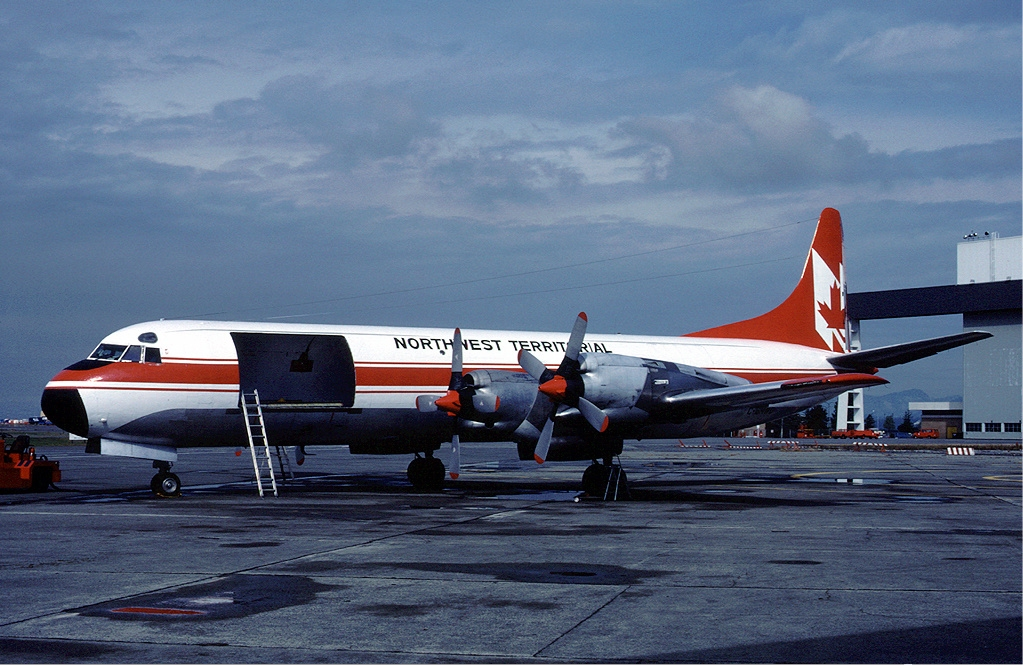
An Electra freighter of NWT Air at Vancouver Airport in August 1983

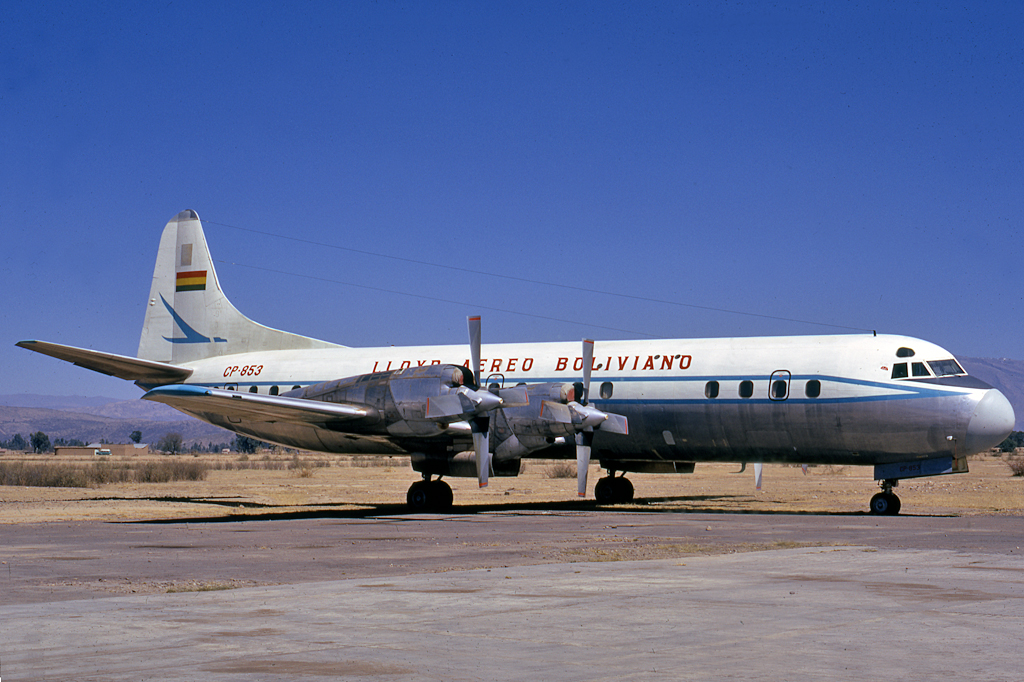
Lockheed L-188 Electra of Lloyd Aéreo Boliviano operating at El Alto International Airport, La Paz, Bolivia, in 1970

In 1957, the United States Navy issued a requirement for an advanced maritime patrol aircraft. Lockheed proposed a development of the Electra that was later placed into production as the P-3 Orion, which had much greater success – the Orion has been in continual front-line service for more than 50 years.

== Design ==
The Model 188 Electra is a low-wing cantilever monoplane powered by four wing-mounted Allison 501-D13 turboprops. It has a retractable tricycle landing gear and a conventional tail. It has a cockpit crew of three and can carry 66 to 80 passengers in a mixed-class arrangement, although 98 could be carried in a high-density layout. The first variant was the Model 188A, followed by the longer-range 188C with room for 1,000 US gallons (3,800 L) more fuel and maximum take-off weight 15000 kg / 33069 lbs.

== Operational history ==
=== Civilian operations ===
American Airlines was the launch customer. Eastern Air Lines, Braniff Airways, and Northwest Airlines followed. The Electra suffered a troubled start. Passengers of early aircraft complained of noise in the cabin forward of the wings, caused by propeller resonance. Lockheed redesigned the engine nacelles, tilting the engines upwards 3°. The changes were incorporated on the production line by mid-1959 or as modification kits for the aircraft already built, and resulted in improved performance and a better ride for passengers.

Three aircraft were lost in fatal accidents between February 1959 and March 1960. After the third crash, the FAA limited the Electra's speed until the cause could be determined. After an extensive investigation, two of the crashes (in September 1959 and March 1960) were found to be caused by an engine-mount problem. The mounting of the gearbox cracked, and the reduced rigidity enabled a phenomenon called "whirl mode flutter" (analogous to the precession of a child's spinning top as it slows down, an interaction of propellers with airflow) that affected the outboard engine nacelles. When the oscillation was transmitted to the wings and the flutter frequency decreased to a point where it was resonant with the outer wing panels (at the same frequency, or harmonically related ones), violent up-and-down oscillation increased until the wings would tear off.

The company implemented an expensive modification program (the Lockheed Electra Achievement Program, LEAP) in which the engine mounts and the wing structures supporting the mounts were strengthened, and some of the wing skins were replaced with thicker material. All Electras were modified by the factory at Lockheed's expense, with the modifications taking 20 days for each aircraft. The changes were incorporated in later aircraft as they were built. However, the damage had been done, and the public lost confidence in the type. This and the smaller jets that were being introduced eventually relegated Electras to the smallest airlines. Production ended in 1961 after 170 had been built. Losses to Lockheed have been estimated as high as $57 million, not counting an additional $55 million in lawsuits. Electras continued to carry passengers into the 1990s, but most now in use are freighters.

Several airlines in the US flew Electras, but the only European airline to order the type from Lockheed was KLM, which used 12 between September 1959 and January 1969 in Europe and east to Saigon and Kuala Lumpur.

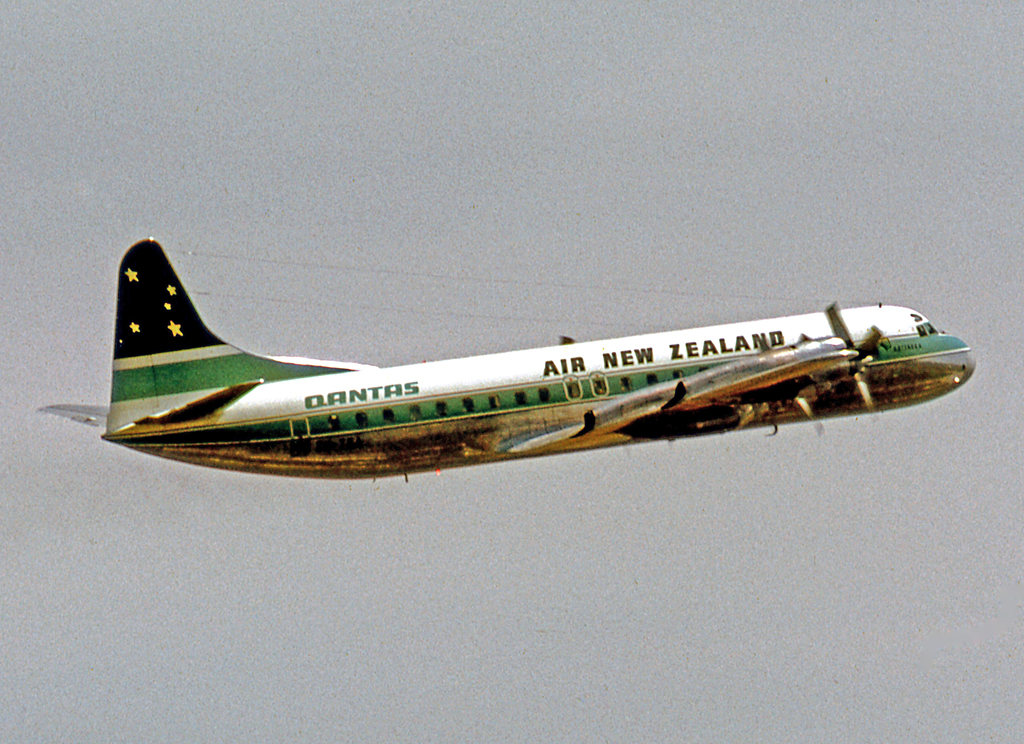
Air New Zealand L-188C Electra departing Sydney for Wellington in 1970 on the joint schedule with Qantas

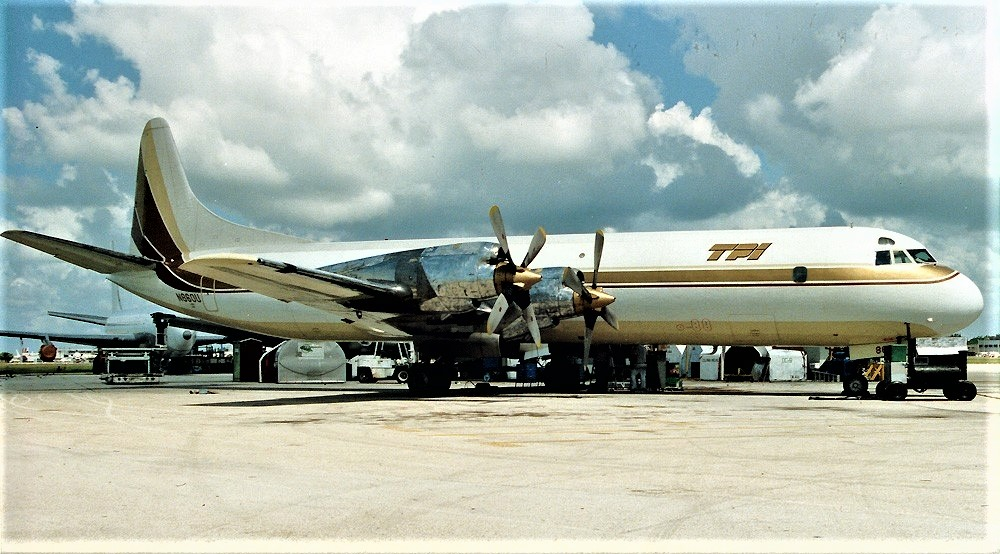
A TPI International Airways (N860U) L-188 at Miami International Airport, July 10, 1989

In the South Pacific, Tasman Empire Airways Limited (TEAL) and its successor Air New Zealand flew the Electra on trans-Tasman flights. In Australia Trans Australia Airlines (TAA) and Ansett each operated three Electras on trunk routes between the Australian mainland state capital cities, and later to Port Moresby, from 1959 until 1971. Ansett had its three Electras converted to freighters in 1970–71 and continued to fly them until 1984. Qantas also operated four Electras on its routes to Hong Kong and Japan, to New Caledonia, and to New Guinea (until the New Guinea route was handed to Ansett and TAA); then later across the Indian Ocean to South Africa, and across the Tasman in competition with TEAL after that airline became 100% New Zealand-owned. The divestiture of TEAL's 50%-Australian shareholding was itself prompted by the Electra order, as TEAL wanted jet aircraft, but was forced by the Australian government to order Electras in order to standardise with Qantas. Three Qantas Electras were retired in the mid-1960s and the fourth in 1971.

Some Electras were sold to South American airlines, where the Electra had highly successful operations, such as those of Lloyd Aéreo Boliviano and Líneas Aéreas Paraguayas; in both cases, the Electra ensured the airlines' international operations before they started using jets. Most notably, Brazilian flag carrier airline Varig operated flawlessly a fleet of 14 Electras on the extremely busy Rio de Janeiro-São Paulo shuttle service (the so-called Ponte Aérea – or "Air Bridge" in Portuguese) for 30 years, completing over half a million flights on the route before the type was replaced by Boeing 737-300 and Fokker 100 jets in 1992. The Electra became so iconic on that route that its retirement caused a commotion in Brazil, with extensive press coverage and many special tributes.

In 1972, Lockheed released a report on the status of the Electra on the occasion of the 15th anniversary of its first flight. It noted that 90% of the original production were still in operation. 82 Electras were in operation with 19 passenger airlines, including Eastern. 16 were in operation among 12 air travel clubs, such as Nomads, Voyager 1000 and Ports of Call. 36 had been converted to freighters, operated by names like Overseas National Airways (ONA) and Saturn Airways. Some were in specialist roles with NASA, NCAR and Nordair (operating on behalf of the Canadian government).

A freighter conversion was developed by a subsidiary of Lockheed from 1968 with one or two large doors in the left side of the fuselage and a reinforced cabin floor. A major user of cargo Electras in 1970s and 1980s were civilian contractors for the Logair (United States Air Force) and Quicktrans (United States Navy) domestic military cargo networks. Such contractors included Universal Airlines, ONA, Saturn, Trans International Airlines and Zantop International Airlines. A perhaps less expected contractor was Hawaiian Airlines, which operated cargo Electras for Logair in the late 1970s.

In California, Holiday Airlines operated Electras from the late 1960s through the early 1970s into Lake Tahoe Airport, which did not permit the use of jets at the time. On the collapse of Holiday in 1974, its service was backfilled by Air California and Pacific Southwest Airlines, both of which re-acquired Electras to serve Lake Tahoe.

=== Military use ===
In 1973, the Argentine Navy bought three Electras equipped with cargo doors. These were used during the "Dirty War" to toss political prisoners into the Rio de La Plata in the infamous death flights. The Electras were also used for transport duties during the Falklands War in 1982.

In 1983, after the retirement of its last SP-2H Neptune, the Argentine Navy bought further civilian Electra airframes, modified several for maritime patrol, and widely used them until their replacement by P-3s in 1994. One of the Argentine Navy's Electras, known locally as L-188E Electron, is preserved at the Argentine Naval Aviation Museum (Museo de la Aviación Naval) at Bahía Blanca.

== Variants ==
L-188A
Initial production version
L-188AF (All Freight version)
Unofficial designation for freighter conversions of L-188A carried out under a supplementary type certificate.
L-188PF (Passenger-Freight version)
Unofficial designation for freighter conversions of L-188A carried out under a supplementary type certificate.
L-188C
Long-range version with increased fuel capacity (6,940 US gallons (26,300 L; 5,780 imp gal) fuel capacity from 5,450 US gallons (20,600 L; 4,540 imp gal) on L-188A) and a higher operating gross weight (Maximum takeoff weight is 116,000 lb (53,000 kg) compared to 113,000 lb (51,000 kg) of the "A" version).
L-188CF
Unofficial designation for freighter conversion of L-188C carried out under a supplementary type certificate.
YP-3A Orion
One Orion aerodynamic test bed, fuselage shortened by 7 feet (2 m).

== Operators ==
=== Current operators ===
By July 2018, only two Electras in the world were transporting cargo, both with Buffalo Airways. Thirteen other aircraft remained in service as air tankers, nine with Air Spray (aerial firefighting) and four with Buffalo Airways (cargo/bulk fuel and aerial firefighting). As of 2024, no passenger flights are taken on Electras, with Air Spray and Buffalo Airways still operating 13 cargo and firefighting planes.

=== Former civilian operators ===
Australia

- Ansett Airlines
- Qantas
- Trans Australia Airlines

Austria

- Amerer Air

Bolivia

- Lloyd Aéreo Boliviano

Brazil

- Varig

Canada

- Conair Group
- International Jetair
- Northwest Territorial Airways
- Nordair 1972–1987 (Canadian Airlines 1987–1989) - 4 operated for Transport Canada Ice Reconnaissance service 1970s–1989

Colombia

- SAM Colombia
- Aerocondor Colombia
- Aerocosta

Republic of the Congo

- Trans Service Airlift

Costa Rica

- Aero Servicios Puntarenas SA (APSA)
- Lacsa

Ecuador

- Ecuatoriana de Aviación
- Transportes Aereos Nacionales Ecuatorianos (TAME)

El Salvador

- TACA International Airlines

Guyana

- Guyana Airways

Honduras

- SAHSA
- Transportes Aereos Nacionales (TAN Airlines)

Hong Kong

- Cathay Pacific Airways

Indonesia

- Garuda Indonesia Airlines
- Mandala Airlines

Ireland

- Hunting Cargo Airlines

Laos

- Royal Air Lao

Mexico

- Banco de México (corporate aircraft)
- Mex-Jet Cargo (all cargo freighter version)

Netherlands

- KLM
- Martinair

Netherlands Antilles

- Air ALM (all cargo freighter version)

Norway

- Fred. Olsen Airtransport
- Nordic Air

New Zealand

- Air New Zealand
- TEAL

Panama

- Copa Airlines

Paraguay

- Líneas Aéreas Paraguayas

Peru

- Líneas Aéreas Nacionales SA

Philippines

- Air Manila International

Sweden

- Falcon Air
- West Air Sweden

Taiwan

- Winner Airways (one L-188A leased from Eastern Air Lines for two months in 1970)

United Kingdom

- Air Bridge Carriers
- Atlantic Airlines
- Channel Express

United States

- Air California
- Air Florida
- American Airlines
- American Flyers Airline
- Braniff International Airways
- CAM Air International
- Eastern Air Lines
- Evergreen International Airlines
- Fairbanks Air Service
- Federal Aviation Administration
- Fiesta-Air
- Fleming International Airways
- Great Northern Airlines
- Gulf Air Transport
- Hawaiian Airlines (in cargo service)
- Holiday Airlines
- Intermountain Aviation
- Interstate Airlines
- Johnson International Airlines
- McCulloch International Airlines
- McCulloch Properties
- NASA
- National Airlines
- National Center for Atmospheric Research
- Northwest Airlines
- Overseas National Airways
- Pacific Southwest Airlines
- Ports of Call Travel Club
- Reeve Aleutian Airways (passenger/cargo "Combi" versions)
- Renown Aviation
- Saturn Airways
- Shillelagh Travel Club
- Southeast Airlines
- Spirit of America Airlines
- Trans International Airlines, later became Transamerica Airlines
- Trans International Airlines (1985–1989)
- TPI International Airways
- Universal Airlines
- Voyager 1000
- Western Airlines
- Zantop International Airlines

Zaire

- Karibu Airways
- Trans Service Airlift

=== Military operators ===
Argentina

- Argentine Naval Aviation

Bolivia

- Bolivian Air Force – 1 from 1973, still in use in 1987.

Ecuador

- TAME

Honduras

- Honduran Air Force – one 188A from 1979

Mexico

- Mexican Air Force – one 188A from 1978 to 1987.

Panama

- Panamanian Air Force – One 188C from 1973 to 1984.

=== Orders ===
Model 188A

- Eastern Air Lines ordered 40 188As which were delivered between November 1958 and August 1959, the last five as 188Cs.
- American Airlines ordered 35 188As which were delivered between November 1958 and March 1960.
- National Airlines ordered 14 188As which were delivered between April 1959 and January 1961.
- Ansett-ANA ordered three 188As which were delivered to Australia in February 1959, April 1959 and February 1960.
- Braniff ordered nine 188As which were delivered between April 1959 and January 1960.
- Western Airlines ordered 12 188As which were delivered between May 1959 and February 1961.
- Cathay Pacific ordered two 188As which were delivered in 1959.
- Trans Australia Airlines ordered three 188As which were delivered to Australia between June 1959 and August 1960.
- General Motors ordered one 188A which was delivered in July 1958.

Model 188C

- Northwest Orient Airlines ordered 18 188Cs which were delivered between July 1959 and June 1961.
- Pacific Southwest Airlines ordered three 188Cs which were delivered in November and December 1959.
- Capital Airlines ordered five 188Cs but later cancelled the order. The five aircraft were sold to other operators.
- Qantas ordered four 188Cs which were delivered between October and December 1959.
- KLM ordered 12 188Cs which were delivered between September 1959 and December 1960.
- Tasman Empire Airways ordered three 188Cs which were delivered in October and December 1959.
- Garuda ordered three 188Cs which were delivered in January 1961.

== Aircraft on display ==
- s/no. 1003 ex NASA N428NA. This was the first P-3 Orion prototype. It was converted from an existing L188 Electra airframe into the YP3V-1/YP-3A Orion. It was later converted into the NP-3A by United States Naval Research Laboratory, then used by NASA for the Earth Resources Observation Program. Preserved at the National Naval Aviation Museum, Forrest Sherman Field, Pensacola, Florida.
- s/no. 1025 ex Varig PP-VJM; preserved at the Museu Aeroespacial in Rio de Janeiro, Brazil
- s/no. 1125 TAM69, in TAM – Transporte Aéreo Militar colors at the Bolivia Aeronautical Museum, El Alto, La Paz, Bolivia.
- ex Argentine Navy 6-P-104, converted to L-188EW WAVE, retired in 1996; on display at the Museo de la Aviación Naval, Bahia Blanca, Argentina.
- ex Argentine Navy 6-P-106, converted to L-188E Electron, retired in 1996; on display at the Museo de la Aviación Naval, Comandante Espora Air Naval Base, Bahia Blanca.

== Accidents and incidents ==
Of the total of 170 Electras built, as of June 2011, 58 have been written off because of crashes and other accidents.

- February 3, 1959: American Airlines Flight 320 en route from Chicago to New York City's LaGuardia Airport crashed on approach, 65 of 73 on board died.
- September 29, 1959: Braniff International Airways Flight 542 crashed near Buffalo, Texas, en route to Dallas, Texas from Houston, Texas. All 29 passengers and five crew members died in the crash. The Civil Aeronautics Board blamed the crash on the "whirl-mode" prop theory and in-flight separation of a wing from the aircraft.
- March 17, 1960: Northwest Orient Flight 710, en route from Chicago to Miami, Florida, broke apart in flight over Perry County, Indiana, in the second "whirl-mode" crash. All 63 people on board died (57 passengers and six crew members).
- September 14, 1960: An Electra operated as American Airlines Flight 361 caught its landing gear on a dike while landing at LaGuardia Airport. The aircraft came to rest upside down. There were no fatalities among the 76 occupants (70 passengers, six crew).
- October 4, 1960: Eastern Air Lines Flight 375 crashed on takeoff from Boston, Massachusetts's Logan International Airport; 62 of 72 on board died. The crash was eventually determined to be the result of bird ingestion into three of the four engines.
- June 12, 1961: KLM Flight 823 crashed short of the runway on approach to Cairo; 20 of the 36 on board died.
- September 17, 1961: Northwest Orient Airlines Flight 706 crashed on takeoff from Chicago-O'Hare International Airport; all 37 on board died. The crash was eventually determined to be the result of mechanical failure in the aileron primary control system due to the improper replacement of the aileron boost assembly.
- March 27, 1965: While on a training flight, a Tasman Empire Airways L-188 crashed while landing at Whenuapai airport in Auckland, New Zealand. Although the aircraft was completely destroyed, all occupants escaped with only one minor injury.
- April 22, 1966: American Flyers Airline Flight 280/D crashed into a hill on approach to Ardmore Municipal Airport in Oklahoma; all five crew and 78 of the 93 passengers on board died.
- February 16, 1967: Garuda Indonesian Airways Flight 708 crashed while attempting to land at Manado-Sam Ratulangi Airport. A total of 22 of 92 passengers and crew on board died. The crash was eventually determined to be the result of an awkward landing technique resulting in an excessive rate of sink on touchdown. Marginal weather at the time of landing was a contributing factor.
- May 3, 1968: Braniff International Airways Flight 352, en route from Houston to Dallas, disintegrated over Dawson, Texas. All 80 passengers and five crew members died. This was the deadliest aviation disaster in Texas at the time. The National Transportation Safety Board found the probable cause to be overstressing of the structure beyond its ultimate strength during attempted recovery from unusual aircraft attitude produced by turbulence of a thunderstorm.
- August 9, 1970: LANSA Flight 502 crashed shortly after takeoff from Quispiquilla Airport near Cusco, Peru; 99 of the 100 people on board, plus two people on the ground, died. The co-pilot was the only survivor.
- August 24, 1970 Universal Airlines L-188C N855U departed Hill Air Force Base in Ogden, Utah on an Air Force Logair flight to Mountain Home Air Force Base in Idaho. The aircraft departed without all its hydraulic systems in operation, leaving insufficient elevator authority, resulting in the aircraft nosing over into the ground. The aircraft was destroyed but the crew escaped with injuries. The investigation found fault with the captain and flight engineer for not following approved procedures and directives.
- December 24, 1971: LANSA Flight 508, en route from Lima to Pucallpa, Peru, entered an area of strong turbulence and lightning and disintegrated in midair due to structural failure following a lightning strike and fire. Of the 92 people on board, 91 died. One passenger, Juliane Koepcke, survived when trees cushioned her fall into the rainforest.
- March 19, 1972 Universal Airlines L-188C N851U was on a ferry flight from Tucson, Arizona to Hill Air Force Base in Ogden, Utah when it developed an engine overspeed issue, complicated by an inability to feather. The aircraft landed at Hill just after midnight, whereupon the engine exploded, destroying a large portion of the left wing and causing a substantial fire. The crew had minor injuries but the aircraft was a writeoff. The crew was cited in the investigation for improper procedures.
- August 27, 1973: A Lockheed L-188A Electra passenger plane (HK-777) operated by Aerocondor was destroyed when it flew into the side of the Cerro el Cable mountain shortly after takeoff from Bogotá-Eldorado Airport (BOG), Colombia. All 36 passengers and six crew members died.
- October 30, 1974: On approach to Rea Point Airfield on Melville Island, Northwest Territories (now Nunavut), Canada, Panarctic Oils Flight 416 crashed into the ice-covered sea some 3 km south of its destination after the pilot-in-command abruptly increased the rate of descent in apparent disorientation. All 30 passengers and two of the four crew members, including the pilot-in-command, died.
- June 4, 1976: Air Manila Flight 702, an L-188A (RP-C1061), crashed just after takeoff from the Guam Naval Air Station; the 45 occupants and one person on the ground died.
- On November 18, 1979, Transamerica Airlines Flight 18 L-188 (N859U), operating a flight for the US military (Logair 3N18) from Hill Air Force Base, crashed near Salt Lake City airport, Utah. While climbing between 12,000 and 13,000 ft, all electrical power was lost; the crew requested an immediate descent. The aircraft attained a high airspeed and a high rate of descent and the aircraft disintegrated in flight; all three crew members died. The NTSB investigation stated the probable cause was a progressive failure of the aircraft electrical system leading to the disabling or erratic performance of flight critical flight instruments and lighting. As a result, the crew became disoriented and lost control of the aircraft. The crew's efforts to regain control of the aircraft imposed loads which exceeded the design limits and caused it to break up in flight. This was the third Universal Airlines Electra to be destroyed in connection with Hill Air Force Base (inherited by Trans International from Saturn Airways). See August 24, 1970 and March 19, 1972.
- January 8, 1981, a SAHSA L-188A crashed in Guatemala City, killing all six crew members on board.
- On 8 June 1983, Reeve Aleutian Airways Flight 8's number-four propeller separated from the aircraft and tore a hole in the fuselage over the Pacific Ocean causing a rapid decompression and loss of control. The pilots managed to land the aircraft safely at Anchorage, Alaska and all 15 passengers and crew survived. Since the propeller fell into the sea and was never recovered, the cause of the separation is unknown.
- May 30, 1984, Zantop International Airlines Flight 931, a Lockheed L-188AF Electra (N5523) flying regularly scheduled cargo service from Baltimore/Washington International Airport (BWI) to Detroit-Willow Run Airport (YIP), crashed at Chalkhill, Pennsylvania; all three crew members and the sole passenger died. While cruising at FL220, at approximately 01:44 AM, the aircraft entered an unusual attitude shortly after a course change. During efforts to recover the aircraft the pilots imposed loads on the airframe that exceeded the aircraft's design limits and it broke apart at altitude. NTSB reported that in-flight problems with the aircraft's gyros likely provided conflicting attitude data to the flight crew at the time of the upset and this, combined with a lack of visual cues, were contributing causes of the accident.
- January 21, 1985: Chartered Galaxy Airlines Flight 203 crashed after takeoff from Reno-Cannon International Airport en route to Minneapolis–St Paul Minnesota; 70 of the 71 people on board died.
- September 12, 1988: A Tame Ecuador L-188A Electra, registration HC-AZY, crashed near Lago Agrio Airport shortly after takeoff; six crew and one passenger died.
- September 4, 1989: A Tame Ecuador L-188C Electra, registration HC-AZJ, crash-landed at Taura AFB with no fatalities.
- December 18, 1995: An overloaded 188C of Trans Service Airlift crashed near Cahungula, Angola, with the loss of 141 of the 144 occupants. This is the deadliest aviation disaster involving the Lockheed L-188 Electra.
- February 8, 1999: An Air Karibu L-188 (9Q-CDI) crashed after takeoff from N'djili Airport killing all seven crew members. The aircraft had been overloaded, and the flight engineer was serving as a co-pilot because no other co-pilots were present. A ground mechanic took the flight engineer's place.
- October 16, 2000: An Air Spray Lockheed L-188 Electra (Tanker #88 C-FQYB) was destroyed in a fire at Air Spray's maintenance facility in Red Deer, Alberta. Many other WW2 era planes were also consumed amidst the blaze.
- July 16, 2003: An Air Spray Lockheed L-188 Electra (Tanker #86 C-GFQA) crashed and was destroyed near Cranbrook, British Columbia shortly after delivering the retardant load. Tanker 86 was seen to turn right initially, then entered a turn to the left. At 1221 MST, the Electra struck the terrain on the side of a steep ridge at about 3900 feet above sea level. The aircraft exploded on impact and the two pilots died. An intense post-crash fire consumed much of the wreckage and started a forest fire at the crash site and the surrounding area.

== Specifications (Model 188A) ==
Data from Lockheed Aircraft since 1913

General characteristics

- Crew: Three
- Capacity:
  - 98 passengers or
  - 33,800 lb (15,300 kg) payload
- Length: 104 ft 6 in (31.85 m)
- Wingspan: 99 ft 0 in (30.18 m)
- Height: 32 ft 10 in (10.01 m)
- Wing area: 1,300 sq ft (120 m^{2})
- Aspect ratio: 7.5:1
- Airfoil: NACA 0014-1.10 root, NACA 0012-1.10 tip
- Empty weight: 57,400 lb (26,036 kg)
- Max takeoff weight: 113,000 lb (51,256 kg)
- Fuel capacity: 5,520 US gal (4,600 imp gal; 20,900 L) normal capacity
- Powerplant: 4 × Allison 501-D13 turboprop engines, 3,750 shp (2,800 kW) each
- Propellers: 4-bladed Aeroproducts or Hamilton Standard, 13 ft 6 in (4.11 m) diameter

Performance

- Maximum speed: 389 kn (448 mph, 721 km/h) at 12,000 ft (3,700 m)
- Cruise speed: 324 kn (373 mph, 600 km/h)
- Range: 1,900 nmi (2,200 mi, 3,500 km) with maximum payload, 2,410 nmi (2,770 mi; 4,460 km)
- Service ceiling: 28,400 ft (8,700 m)
- Rate of climb: 1,970 ft/min (10.0 m/s)

== See also ==
- Lockheed Model 10 Electra, an unrelated piston-engine airliner sharing the same name

Related development

- Lockheed P-3 Orion
- Lockheed CP-140 Aurora
- Lockheed P-7

Aircraft of comparable role, configuration, and era

- Antonov An-10
- Antonov An-12
- Bristol Britannia
- Canadair CL-44
- Ilyushin Il-18
- Vickers Vanguard
- Vickers Viscount
