= Trans Service Airlift =

Airline of the Democratic Republic of the Congo

Trans Service Airlift Service de transport aérien
IATA	ICAO	Call sign
-	TSR	TRANS SERVICE
- Commenced operations: 1991
- Ceased operations: 2006
- Hubs: N'djili Airport
- Fleet size: 5
- Headquarters: Kinshasa, Democratic Republic of the Congo

Trans Service Airlift (TSA, French: Service de transport aérien) was an airline based at N'djili Airport, Kinshasa, Democratic Republic of the Congo. It was privately owned and operated in years 1991–1998.

== Accidents and incidents ==
- On December 18, 1995 a Lockheed L-188C Electra owned by Trans Service Airlift crashed shortly after takeoff from Jamba, Cuando Cubango, Angola, killing 141 of the passengers and crew. See Trans Service Airlift Lockheed L-188 crash.

== Fleet ==
According to information in August 2010 the Trans Service Airlift fleet included:

- 2 B727 (Ex-FedEx 2007/2010)
- 2 BAe 748 Series 2(Both aircraft broken up 1996/97)
- 1 Lockheed L-188 Electra (Aircraft sold and parked Kinshasa since Dec 1996 until present day)
- 1 Nord 262 (Aircraft crashed on takeoff N'dolo 1995 killing all pax - crew survived)
- 1 Vickers Viscount 700 (Aircraft broken up 1996)

== See also ==
- Transport in the Democratic Republic of the Congo
