= Amerer Air =

Austrian cargo airline

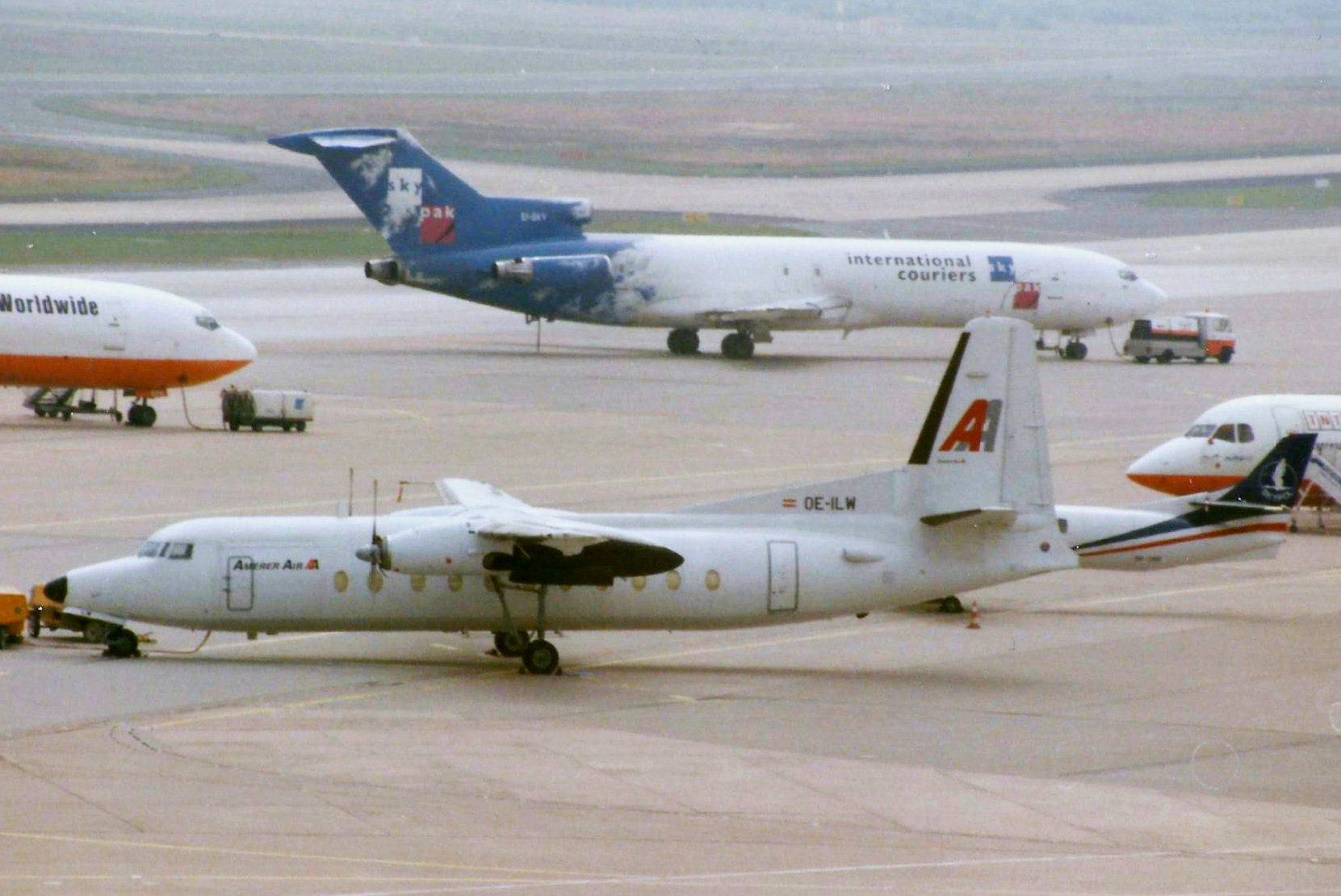
- Fokker F27
| IATA | ICAO | Call sign |
|---|---|---|
| - | AMK | AMER AIR |
- Founded: 1995
- Ceased operations: 2011
- Hubs: Linz Airport
- Headquarters: Linz, Austria
- Key people: Heinz Peter Amerer (CEO)

Amerer Air was a cargo airline based in Linz, Austria. It was Austria's largest dedicated cargo airline, operating services from Linz and Cologne throughout Europe, the Middle East and North Africa. Its main base was Linz Airport. The airline was owned by Heinz Peter Amerer (50%) and Susanne Amerer (50%) and had 40 employees.

== History ==
The airline was established and started operations in 1995 with one freighter Fokker F27 Mk500. Between 1997 and 2006 two Lockheed L-188 Electras were operated for United Parcel Service and TNT N.V. In 1999, international long distance road transport was introduced to supplement air freight activities. In October 2011 all airline-type operations were halted.

== Fleet ==
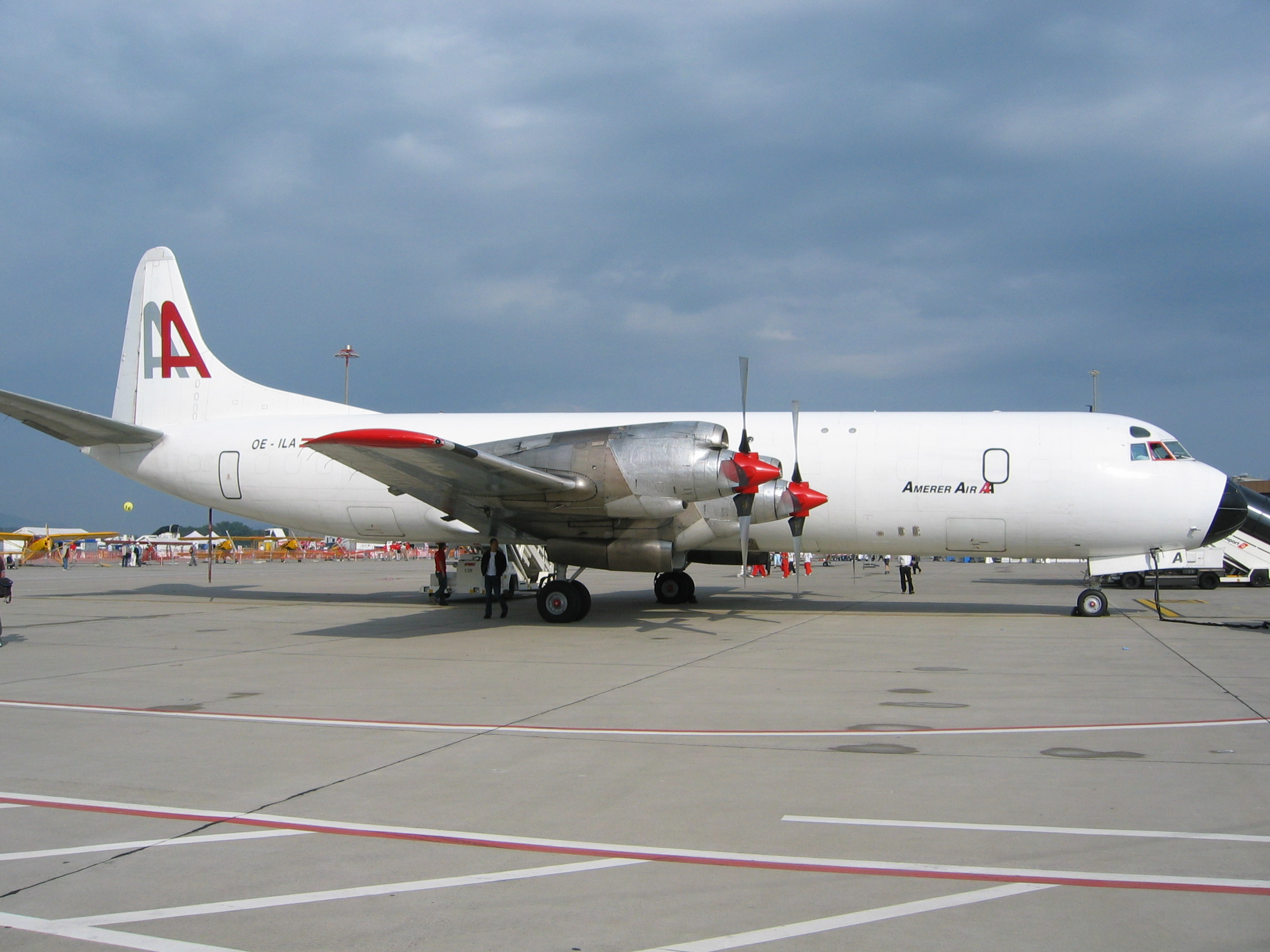
A Lockheed L-188 Electra all-cargo version

The airline operated:

- 2 Fokker F27 Mk500
- 2 Lockheed L-188 Electra
