= Northwest Orient Airlines Flight 706 =

1961 aviation accident

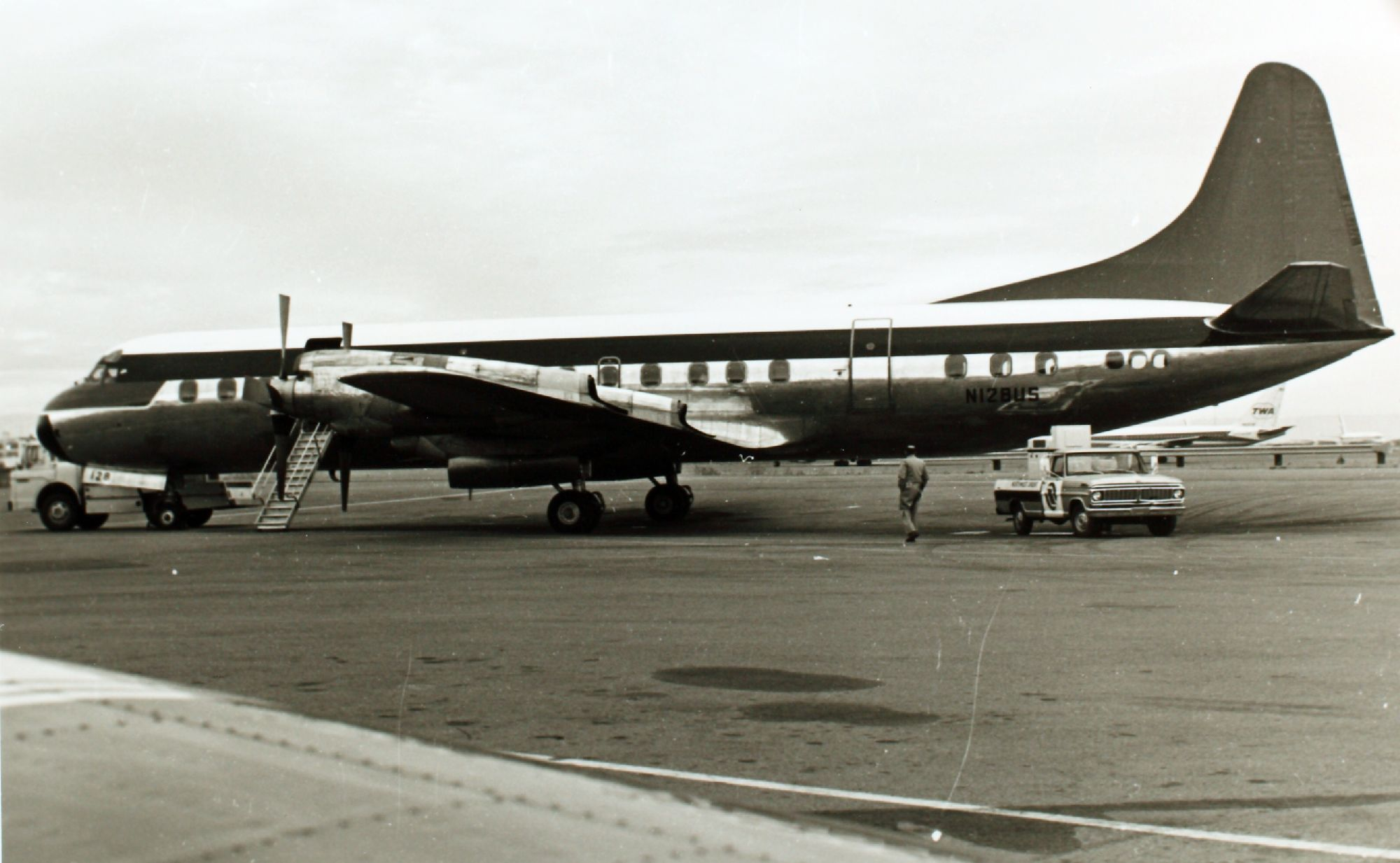
- A Northwest Orient Lockheed L-188 Electra, similar to the accident aircraft

Crash
- Date: September 17, 1961
- Summary: Maintenance error
- Site: O'Hare International Airport, Franklin Park, Illinois, US; 41.9606°N 87.9190°W

Aircraft
- Aircraft type: Lockheed L-188C Electra
- Operator: Northwest Orient Airlines
- Registration: N137US
- Flight origin: Milwaukee Mitchell International Airport
- Last stopover: Chicago O’Hare International Airport
- Destination: Tampa International Airport
- Occupants: 37
- Passengers: 32
- Crew: 5
- Fatalities: 37
- Survivors: 0

Northwest Orient Airlines Flight 706 was a Lockheed L-188 Electra aircraft, registration N137US, which crashed on take-off from Chicago's O'Hare International Airport September 17, 1961. All 37 on board were killed in the accident.

Flight 706 began its day in Milwaukee, Wisconsin, and was scheduled to stop at Chicago before travelling to Tampa, Fort Lauderdale, and Miami, Florida. It arrived at Chicago in the early morning and left soon afterwards, being cleared for takeoff at 8:55 AM. Takeoff was normal until the aircraft reached the altitude of 100 feet above ground level, when witnesses noticed a slight change in the sound of the Electra's engines. The aircraft began a gentle bank to the right as the starboard wing began to drop. The bank angle increased to 35°; at that point the tower controllers picked up a garbled broadcast believed to be from the pilots. The aircraft climbed to approximately 300 feet but continued to bank, eventually reaching a bank angle of over 50°. At that point, the starboard wing nicked a series of high-tension power lines running along the south boundary of the airport; shortly after that, the aircraft struck an embankment and cartwheeled onto its nose. The forward fuselage broke off, the plane pancaked and skidded, then launched into the air and slammed nose-first into the ground, falling over on its back and exploding into a ball of flame. The accident took less than two minutes from the beginning of takeoff until the final crash.

Investigators with the Civil Aeronautics Board determined that the cable physically connecting the first officer's control wheel to the aileron boost unit had disconnected. This had caused the ailerons to put the aircraft in a starboard-wing-down attitude, and had prevented the pilots from being able to correct the bank. The cables attaching the pilots' control wheels to the aileron boost unit had been removed two months before the accident during routine maintenance; a safety cable that held part of the assembly together had not been replaced when the cables were hooked back up. The contact slowly separated, until it completely failed during the takeoff sequence.

== See also ==
- Aviation safety
- List of accidents and incidents involving commercial aircraft
