= 1995 Trans Service Airlift Electra crash =

Aviation disaster in Angola

Coordinates: 17°27′S 22°36′E

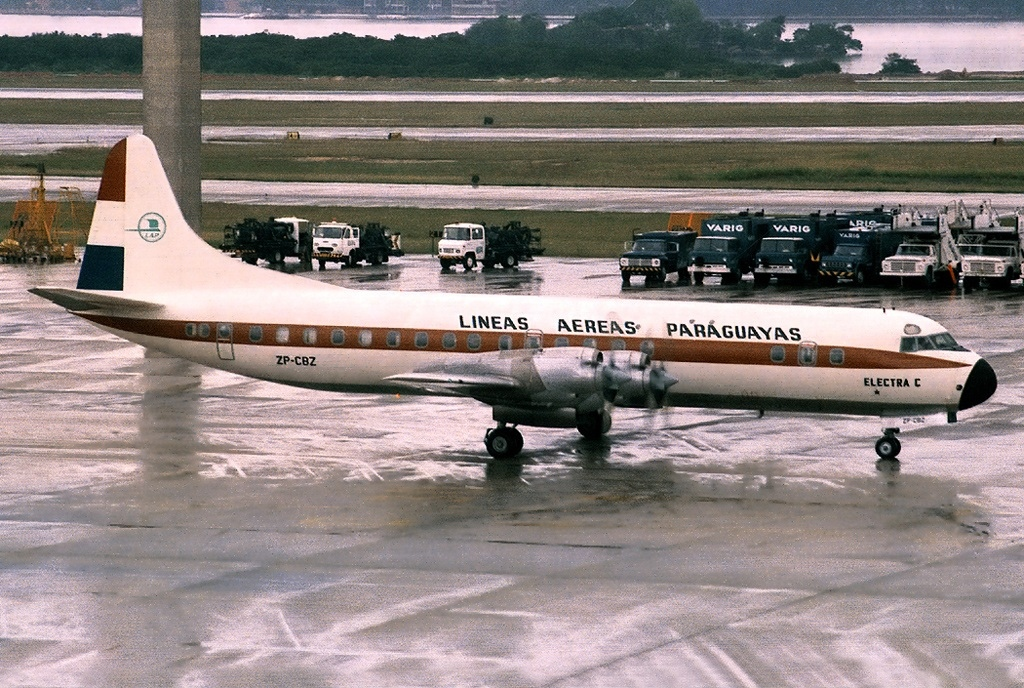
- The aircraft involved in the accident while still in service with Líneas Aéreas Paraguayas (LAP) in 1984

Accident
- Date: 18 December 1995
- Summary: Loss of control due to overloading
- Site: Jamba, Cuando, Angola

Aircraft
- Aircraft type: Lockheed L-188C Electra
- Operator: Trans Service Airlift
- Registration: 9Q-CRR
- Flight origin: Jamba, Angola (airport not named)
- Destination: unknown (northern Angola)
- Occupants: 144
- Passengers: 139
- Crew: 5
- Fatalities: 141
- Injuries: 3
- Survivors: 3

The Trans Service Airlift Lockheed L-188 crash occurred on 18 December 1995 when a Lockheed L-188C Electra owned by Trans Service Airlift crashed near Jamba, Angola, killing 141 of the passengers and crew.

== Background ==
Trans Service Airlift (TSA), was a private company headquartered at Ndjili Airport, Kinshasa. The Electra was one of a number of ageing aircraft operated by TSA. Built in 1959, it was sold to TSA in 1992, after service with other operators.

On the date of the accident, the aircraft was flying a special charter for UNITA. Following the 1993 trade embargo on UNITA there were frequent "sanction busting" flights out of Zaire. TSA was one of the companies cited in connection with these operations. These flights rarely carried weapons (which were typically supplied over ground routes); usual cargoes were personnel, fuels, food, and medical supplies. The Angolan Government later claimed the aircraft was carrying weapons.

== Accident ==
The aircraft, with 139 passengers and five crew members, was carrying forty more people than the plane was designed to carry, without taking cargo into account. It crashed two minutes after take-off. Some reports speculate that cargo may have slid to the back of the plane, resulting in a weight imbalance and causing the crash.

Initial reports by Zairean officials stated that the plane crashed near Cahungula, Lunda Norte Province, while transporting diamond miners from Zaire's capital, Kinshasa.

The co-pilot and two passengers survived the initial crash. The accident was the deadliest plane crash in 1995 until the crash of American Airlines Flight 965 two days later. It remains the deadliest ever plane crash in Angola.

== See also ==
- List of accidents and incidents involving airliners by airline
