= Air Manila =

Domestic airline of the Philippines (1964–1973)

| IATA | ICAO | Call sign |
|---|---|---|
| UM | AMK | — |
- Founded: 1964
- Commenced operations: January 2, 1965
- Ceased operations: 1973 (merged into Philippine Airlines)
- Hubs: Ninoy Aquino International Airport (Manila)
- Subsidiaries: Air Manila International
- Headquarters: Manila, Philippines

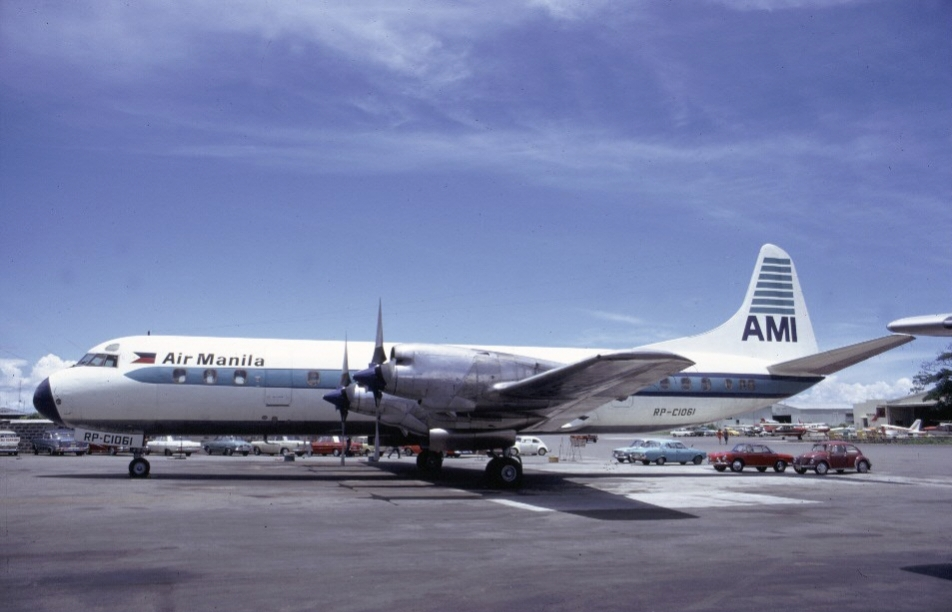
The Air Manila Lockheed L-188 Electra Volpati that crashed in Guam in 1976.

Air Manila was a domestic airline in the Philippines. It was based out of Manila and operated propeller aircraft including the Handley Page Dart Herald, Fokker F27 Friendship and Lockheed L-188 Electra.

In the 1970s Air Manila obtained five second-hand Boeing 707s, with the goal of starting an international air service under the name of "Air Manila International". This move was opposed by Philippine Airlines (PAL), the national flag-carrier. Under government pressure, Air Manila and Filipinas Orient Airways were merged into PAL in 1973.

== Fleet ==
- Boeing 707-320B
- Lockheed L-188 Electra

== Accidents and incidents ==
On 4 June 1976, Air Manila Flight 702, a Lockheed L-188 Electra, crashed after taking off from Antonio B. Won Pat International Airport in Guam, killing all 45 on board and one person on the ground.
