= Filipinas Orient Airways =

Airline from the Philippines

IATA	ICAO	Call sign
FE	FE	—
- Founded: 1964
- Commenced operations: 1965
- Ceased operations: 1972 (merged into Philippine Airlines)
- Hubs: Manila International Airport
- Destinations: 18
- Headquarters: Manila, Philippines
- Key people: Caram Family

Filipinas Orient Airways, Inc. was an airline founded by the originally Lebanese refugee family Karam (later Caram) in the Philippines in 1964, under Republic Act No. 4147. Filipinas Orient was granted the franchise to provide air transport service in the Philippines and between the Philippines and other countries on June 20, 1964, despite legal opposition by Philippine Airlines. The company slogan was The Nation's Flag Carrier.

== Service ==
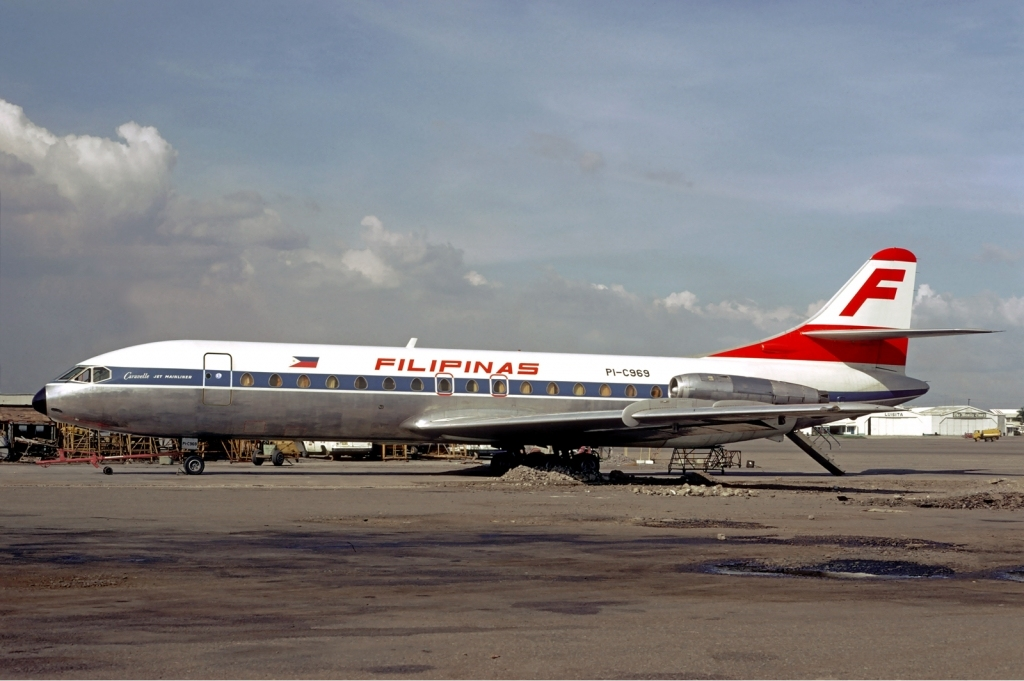
A Filipinas Orient Airways Sud Aviation Caravelle in storage at Manila International Airport, 1974.

Filipinas Orient, also known as "Fairways", started domestic flight operations in the Philippines on January 5, 1965, using Douglas DC-3 aircraft. Their early days appear to have been crash-ridden with the loss of four DC-3 and one DC-6 within the first 4 years of operation. By April 1967, they were flying a mix of DC-3, DC-6B and NAMC YS-11 aircraft. They subsequently acquired three Nord 262, and in 1972 gained two Sud Aviation Caravelles

Their flight operations were ended after the declaration of Martial Law by then Philippine President Ferdinand Marcos on September 21, 1972. Philippine Airlines eventually took over the planes and routes of Filipinas Orient.

== Fleet ==
- Douglas DC-3
- Douglas DC-6B
- NAMC YS-11
- Nord 262
- Sud Aviation Caravelle

== Destinations ==
Country	City	Airport	Notes	Refs
Philippines	Basco	Basco Airport	—	
Philippines	Boracay	Godofredo P. Ramos Airport	—	
Philippines	Cebu	Mactan–Cebu International Airport	—	
Philippines	El Nido	El Nido Airport	—	
Philippines	Iloilo	Mandurriao Airport	—	
Philippines	Manila	Manila International Airport	Hub (Note: International Hub)	
Philippines	Mati	Imelda R. Marcos Airport	—	
Philippines	Roxas City	Roxas City Airport	—	
Singapore	Singapore	Singapore International Airport	—	
South Vietnam	Saigon	Tan Son Nhat International Airport	—	
Thailand	Bangkok	Don Muang International Airport	—	
United States	Los Angeles	Los Angeles International Airport	—	

== Accidents and incidents ==
On April 23, 1969, Douglas DC-3A PI-C947 was damaged beyond economic repair in a landing accident at Roxas City Airport. All 31 passengers and crew survived.
