= Air Manila Flight 702 =

1976 aviation accident in Guam

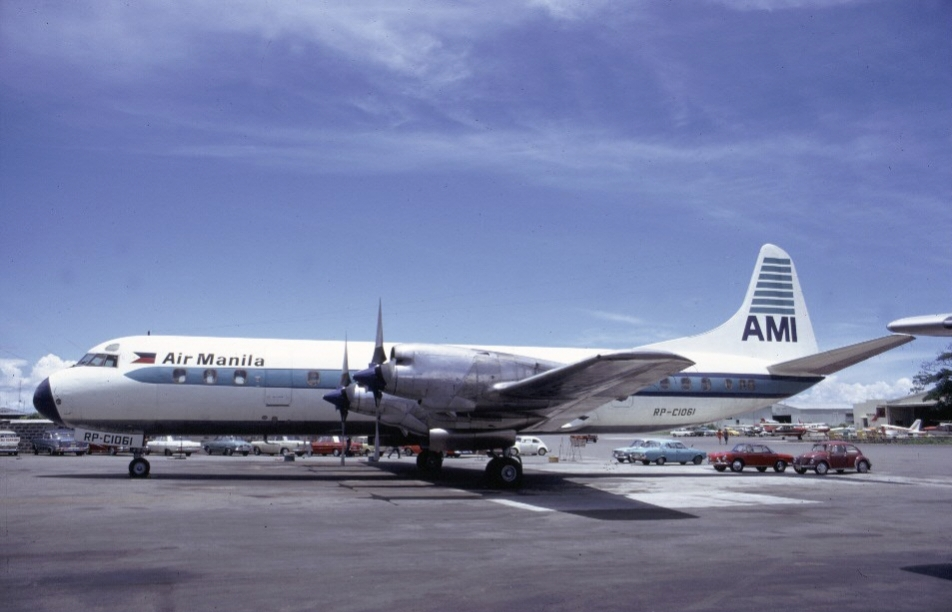
- RP-C1061, the aircraft involved in the accident, seen in 1974

Accident
- Date: 4 June 1976
- Summary: Engine failure followed by pilot error
- Site: Southwest of Naval Air Station Agana; 13°29.5′N 144°49′E
- Total fatalities: 46
- Total injuries: 2

Aircraft
- Aircraft type: Lockheed L-188A Electra
- Operator: Air Manila
- Registration: RP-C1061
- Flight origin: Naval Air Station Agana
- Destination: Ninoy Aquino International Airport
- Occupants: 45
- Passengers: 33
- Crew: 12
- Fatalities: 45
- Survivors: 0

Ground casualties
- Ground fatalities: 1
- Ground injuries: 2

Air Manila Flight 702 was an unscheduled passenger flight from Naval Air Station Agana in Guam to Ninoy Aquino International Airport in Manila, carrying 33 passengers and 12 crew members; most of whom were personnel from the base. The Lockheed L-188A Electra attempted takeoff from runway 6L but crashed near a residential area; the crash was caused by retracting the flaps at an altitude too low to clear the terrain after the propeller of engine number three feathered. All 45 people on board and one person on the ground perished in the crash. The investigation concluded that the pilot should have followed company policy by aborting takeoff in the event of an engine failure before reaching VR (takeoff) speed.

== Aircraft ==
The aircraft involved in the accident was a Lockheed L-188A Electra with four Allison 501-D13 engines, registered RP-C1061 to Air Manila International at the time of the accident. The aircraft made its maiden flight in 1958, then registered to Eastern Airlines as N5502. The aircraft was then sold to Air Manila on November 30, 1971. Maintenance records showed the transponder listed as "inoperable". Engine No.2 to be shut down en route to Guam due to mechanical issues; several pilots reported issues with the No.3 engine in the maintenance log before the crash.

== Crew ==
Twelve crew members were on board flight 702 when it crashed: four members of the flight crew, the loading master, two mechanics, and four flight attendants. One of the flight attendants on board was Nelita (Nellie) Ner, age 26, of Manila, Philippines. Ner earlier flew as a flight attendant with Northwest Orient Airlines, based at MNL.

The cockpit crew consisted of:

- Captain Roberto Javalera, 46, who worked for Air Manila since 16 September 1964, served as pilot in command on the flight. A veteran pilot, having logged 10,016 total flight hours, roughly 2,422:45 of which were accumulated flying Lockheed L-188A Electras. His license to operate Lockheed L-188A Electras was valid from March 1, 1976, to August 31, 1976. He was required to wear glasses for far-sightedness as needed in flight but this was not a factor in the crash.
- First Officer Ernesto Nacion, 40, served as co-pilot, having worked for Air Manila since 17 April 1968. His pilot's license was valid from January, 1976, to 30 June 1976. Nacion was certified to be a reserve captain for the L-188 Electra on 10 March 1975. At the time of the accident, he had 8,906:44 total flight hours, of which 2,037:21 were on the L-188 Electra.
- Flight Engineer Johnathan Javalera (no relation to the captain), 32, who worked for Air Manila since 28 February 1969.
- Relief Officer Salvador Bello, 33, who worked for Air Manila since 1 February 1970.

== Accident ==
Air Manila flight 702 crashed while attempting to takeoff from runway 6L of Naval Air Station Agana at 14:47 Greenwich time on 4 June 1976. Seconds after lifting off from the runway the No. 3 propeller feathered. Witnesses reported that the plane lifted off the runway near the 7,500 marker of the 10,015 foot runway; also noting that despite the one feathered propeller the takeoff seemed normal. After the failure the plane flew at varying altitudes between 75 and 100 feet for a while, then flew level for 1,600 feet before crashing into terrain past the end of the runway; dragging across a hill, pushing through a chain link fence, and striking a car on the highway before stopping in a vacant space before exploding. All 45 people on board plus the driver of the car struck by the aircraft were killed. Two people who lived near the crash site incurred severe injuries from the explosion.

== Causes ==
The primary cause of the accident was the flight crew's inappropriate response to the engine failure. The captain continued flight with the engine failure despite safely being able to abort takeoff, having not yet reached VR speed. The NTSB reported the causes of the accident as:

The loss of climb capability after the crew retracted the flaps at too low an altitude to clear the rising terrain. The flaps were retracted after the number 3 propeller feathered as the aircraft lifted off the runway. Contributing to the accident was the captain's decision to continue the take-off after an engine failed before reaching the rotation speed.
