= American Flyers Airline =

US airline (1949–1971) that merged into Universal

IATA	ICAO	Call sign
FF^{(1)}	FF^{(1)}	AMERICAN FLYERS
- Founded: September 24, 1949 incorporated in Texas as American Flyers, Inc.
- Ceased operations: 27 May 1971 merged into Universal Airlines
- Operating bases: Harrisburg, Pennsylvania; Ardmore, Oklahoma
- Parent company: The Hillman Company (1967–1971)
- Headquarters: Harrisburg, Pennsylvania; Ft Worth, Texas, United States
- Founder: Reed Pigman (owner/president until 1966)

Notes
- (1) IATA, ICAO codes were the same until the 1980s

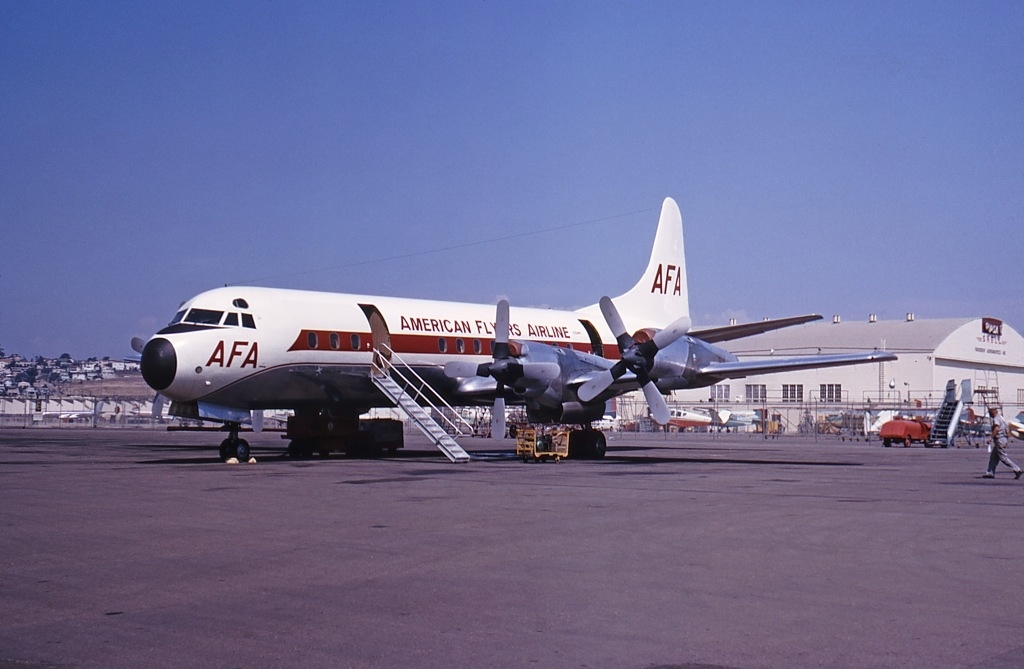
Electra at San Diego 1963

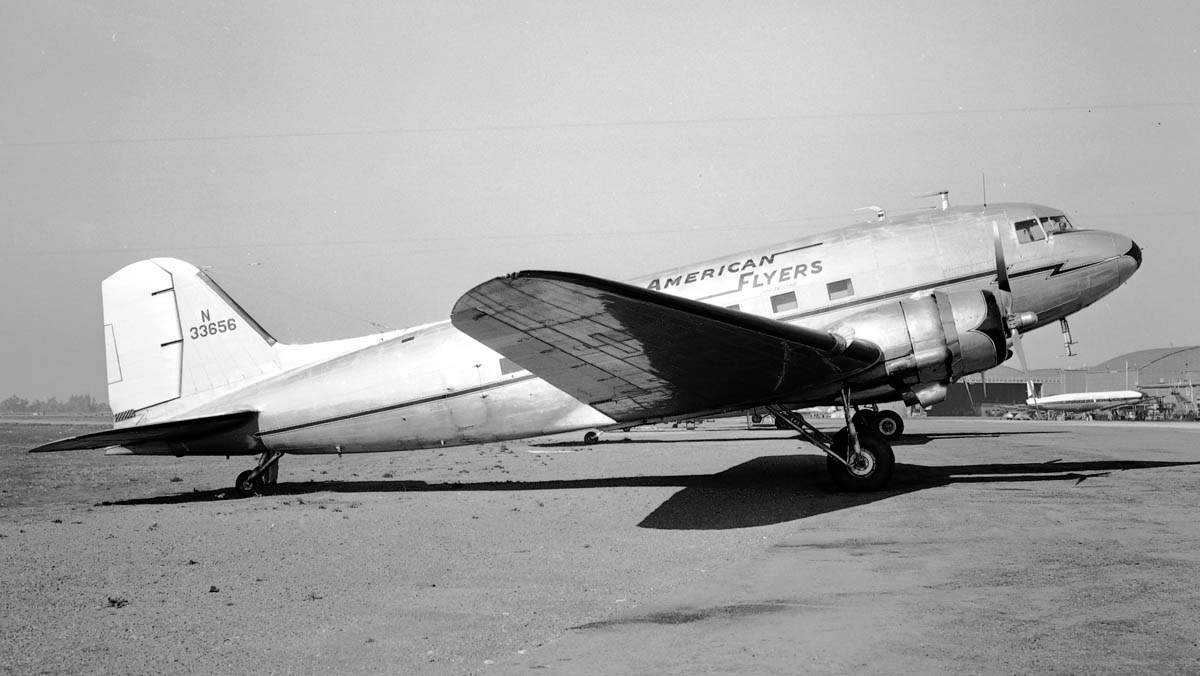
DC-3 Oakland 1952

American Flyers Airline Corporation (AFA) was a United States airline that operated from 1949 to 1971, certificated as a supplemental air carrier (also known as an irregular air carrier) by the Civil Aeronautics Board (CAB), the now defunct Federal agency that, at the time, regulated almost all commercial air transportation in the United States. AFA was owned and operated by aviator Reed Pigman until his death in an AFA accident in 1966. In 1967, ownership passed to a Pennsylvania company, and in 1971, AFA merged into Universal Airlines, another supplemental airline.

The airline was an offshoot of a pilot training enterprise which remains in business as American Flyers.

== History ==
=== Reed Pigman era ===
Reed Pigman was a pilot for the U.S. Weather Bureau from 1935 to 1939, then an executive pilot for an oil company from 1939 to 1941. American Flyers was a dba for the aviation activities of Reed Pigman starting January 1941, in particular flight training. By 1947 American Flyers had a Douglas DC-3. On 31 August 1949, order E-3225 of the CAB approved the transfer of Pigman's Letter of Registration (what irregular air carriers had in lieu of a certificate) to a corporate entity, American Flyers, Inc. However, that entity was only incorporated in Texas on 24 September 1949. In July 1950 the CAB approved the split of the operation into airline and flight instruction arms, with the existing corporation renamed to American Flyers Airline Corporation, and a new corporation taking on the old name and taking over the flight school.

- In 1953 the airline had two DC-3s and a Lockheed Model 12 Electra Junior and was operating at a break-even level with 76% of its revenue from military passenger charters.
- In 1960, the airline moved its operational base to Ardmore Municipal Airport, a former air force base in Oklahoma, with the first employees moving there February 15. The airline's executive offices remained at Fort Worth.
- In 1962 AFA performed 400 military charters and 105 civilian charters with Lockheed Constellations, while performing over 135 additional civilian charters with DC-3s.
- In 1963, AFA brought on board its first Lockheed L-188 Electra turboprops. Revenues were $2.3 million (over $23 million in 2024 dollars) with 28% of that civilian. The airline aimed to increase civilian charters to 50% of its business by seeking business to Hawaii, Canada, Mexico and the Caribbean. Profitability, however, had been poor. The CAB noted that Reed Pigman had, over time, forgiven DC-3s rents owed to him by AFA, which from 1955 to 1962 had totaled $862,000.
- In 1964, the Beatles used an AFA Electra for their second tour of the US, and Reed Pigman hosted them at his ranch in the Ozarks.

The Reed Pigman era came to an abrupt end 22 April 1966 when, because of a medical condition he kept hidden that would have disqualified him as a commercial airline pilot, Pigman, flying as captain, crashed an AFA Electra at Ardmore causing the deaths of himself and 82 other people. See "Accidents" below. In 1966, the airline had revenues of $8.7 million, or over $80 million in 2024 terms, a substantial increase over the 1963 number given above. Lucian J. Hunt, a former American Airlines vice-president, became president.

=== Hillman era ===
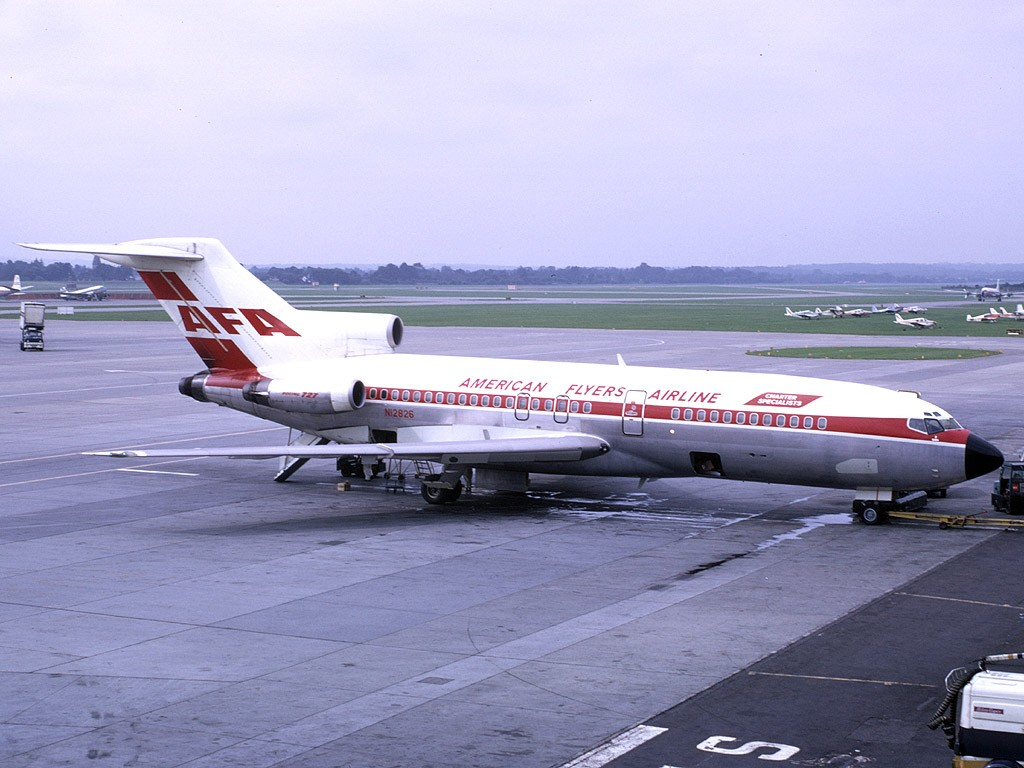
727-100C at Gatwick in 1969

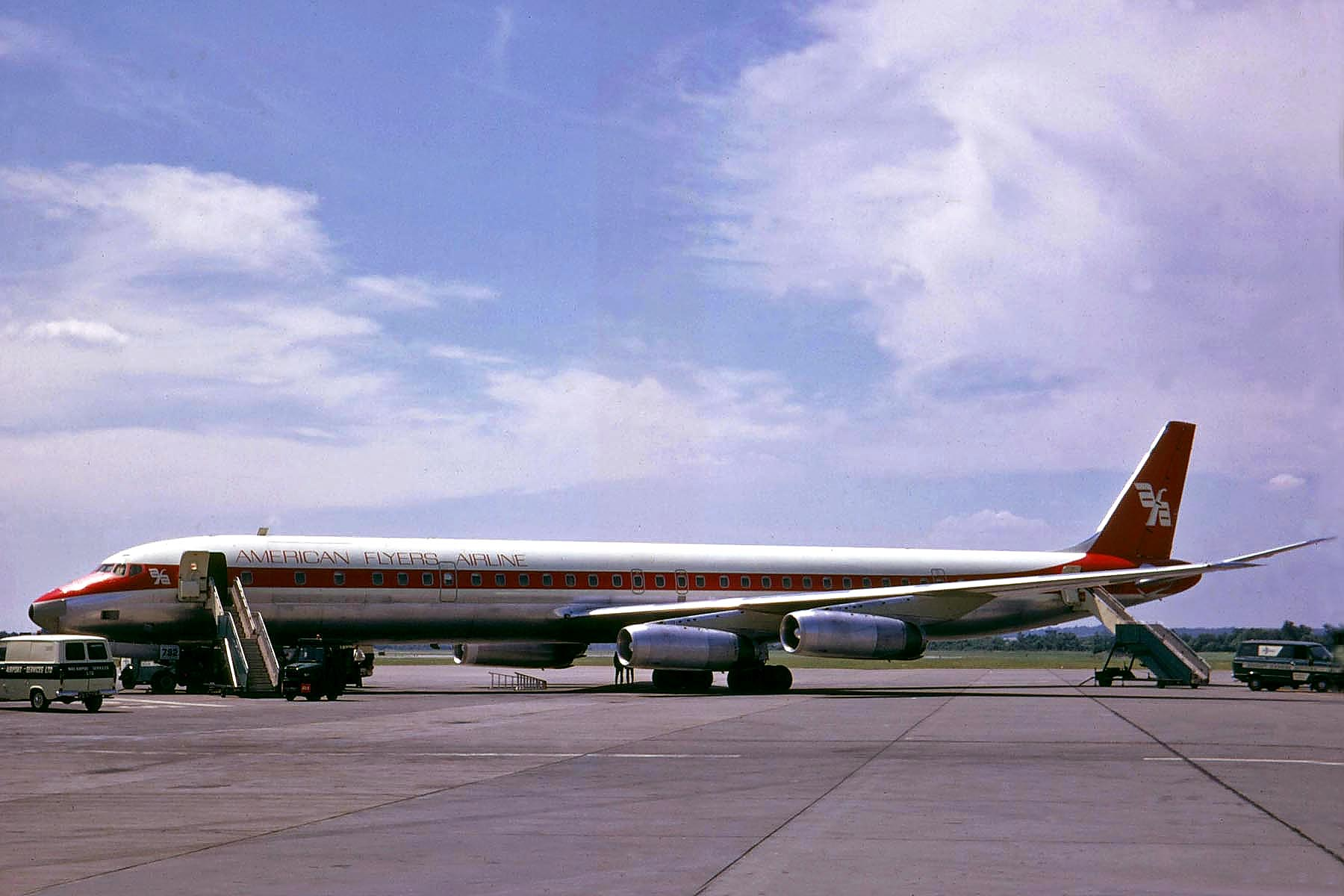
DC-8-63 at Gatwick in 1969

On 31 July 1967, Virginia Pigman, widow of Reed, sold 80% of AFA to First Grant Corporation, a subsidiary of Pittsburgh Coke & Chemical, itself then a subsidiary of The Hillman Company, the investment vehicle of Henry Hillman, a prominent Pittsburgh investor.

- By April 1968 the piston aircraft were gone and the fleet comprised two Boeing 727-100C aircraft (convertible) and five Electras.
- In April 1969, AFA moved its headquarters and operational base to Olmsted State Airport near Harrisburg, Pennsylvania (today's Harrisburg International Airport). The airline cited a desire to be closer to the US major charter markets and need for larger facilities.
- Douglas DC-8-63s went into service June 1969. AFA ordered two in November 1968 for delivery in 1970, taking two such aircraft on lease from Flying Tiger Line in the interim starting in 1969.
- In 1970 AFA had revenues of $21.5 million (over $165 million in 2024 dollars), with a 32.5% military/67.5% civilian split. Unfortunately, it also had a $3.8 million operating loss and a $5 million net loss.

=== Sale to Universal ===
On April 15, 1970, The Hillman Company agreed to sell AFA to Universal Airlines, based on poor financial results and the unwillingness of The Hillman Company to keep funding AFA. Universal was interested in AFA's transatlantic passenger charter rights, something Universal did not have. The two businesses were arguably complementary, with Universal being historically freight-focused, whereas AFA was purely passenger. The merger agreement called for eliminating AFA's 727s and Electras. Indeed, Universal saw transatlantic passenger charters as a lifeline, given the headwinds it was seeing in its other businesses.

The CAB took a year to approve the merger, which closed May 27, 1971.

== Legacy ==
Unfortunately, Universal collapsed within a year of acquiring AFA. Saturn Airways took over the leases for the Lockheed Electra freighters and the Zantop brothers quickly established Zantop International Airlines to take over Universal's autoparts transport business.

== Fleet ==
- In 1953, the AFA fleet comprised two DC-3s and a Lockheed Model 12 Electra Junior.
- In April 1963, the fleet comprised two Lockheed L-188 Electras, four Lockheed L-049 Constellations and four DC-3s.
- In 1970, before the Universal merger was announced, the fleet comprised two DC-8-63s, two 727-100Cs and four Lockheed L-188 Electras

== Accidents ==
- On September 20, 1965, a Lockheed Constellation L-1049 Super Connie (N9719C) on a three-engine ferry flight landed at Ardmore Municipal Airport and slid off a wet runway into a ditch. The aircraft sustained serious damage but the crew was uninjured.

=== Flight 280/D ===
It was determined that Reed Pigman had hidden a long history of heart disease and more recent history of diabetes from the doctors who certified him as fit to fly as a commercial airline pilot and that, while flying an AFA Lockheed Electra (N183H) military charter flight enroute from Monterey Regional Airport in California to Columbus Airport in Georgia on approach to Ardmore airport on April 22, 1966, he suffered a "coronary insufficiency" leading to the crash of the aircraft and the death of all five crew, one non-paying passenger (an AFA employee) and 77 (out of 92) passengers. There is a memorial at the Ardmore Municipal Airport for the crew and passengers that were involved in this accident.

== See also ==
- Universal Airlines (United States)
- Supplemental air carrier
- List of defunct airlines of the United States
