= Ardmore Municipal Airport =

Airport in Oklahoma, United States

Ardmore Municipal Airport Ardmore Industrial Airpark
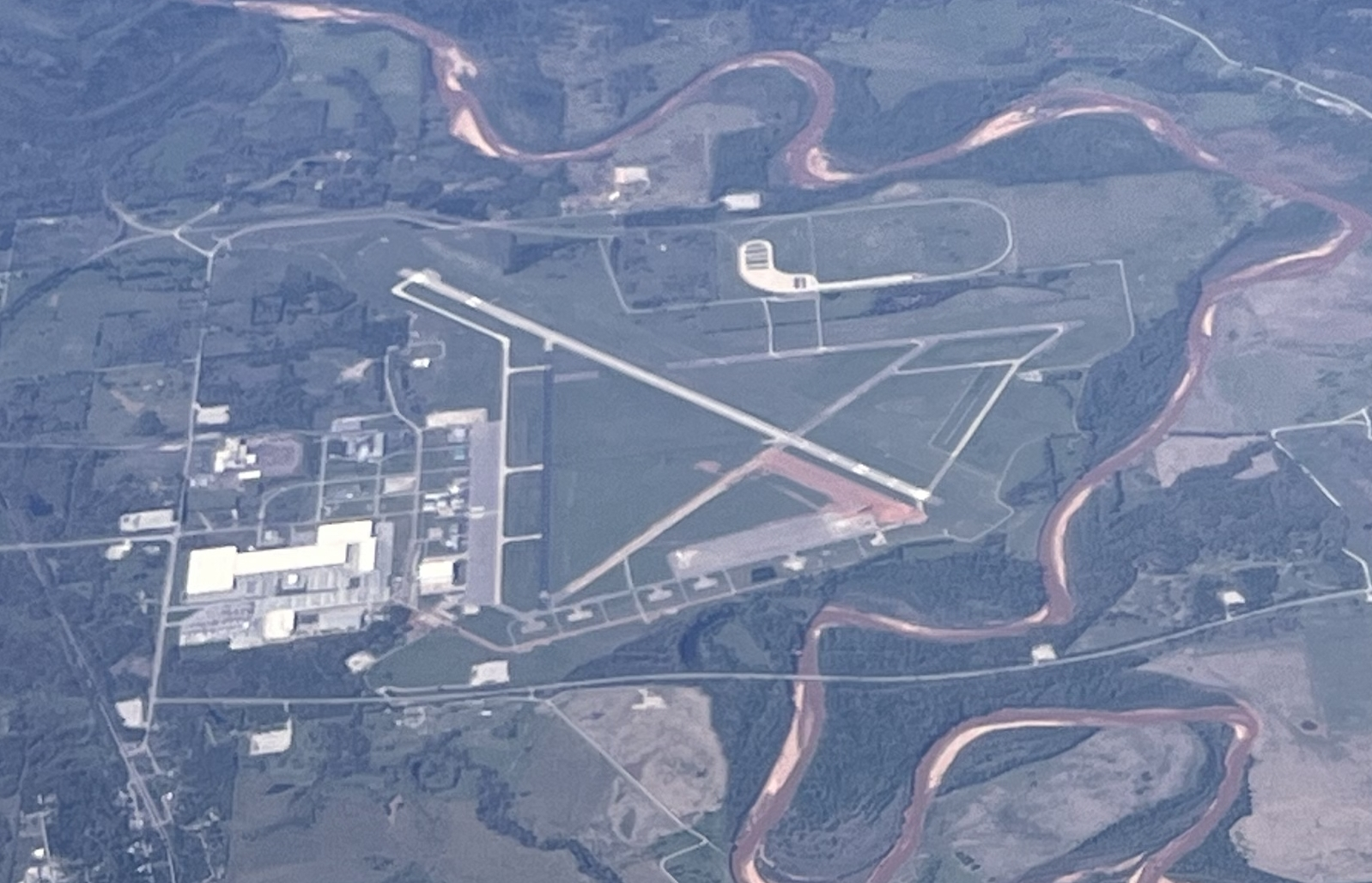
- 2024 aerial photograph
- IATA: ADM; ICAO: KADM; FAA LID: ADM

Summary
- Airport type: Public
- Owner: City of Ardmore
- Serves: Ardmore, Oklahoma
- Elevation AMSL: 777 ft (237 m)
- Coordinates: 34°18′15″N 097°01′14″W

Map
- Location in Oklahoma ADM (the United States)

Runways
Direction	Length		Surface
Direction	ft	m	Surface
13/31	9,001	2,744	Concrete
17/35	5,350	1,631	Asphalt

Statistics (2009)
- Aircraft operations: 45,729
- Based aircraft: 15
- Source: Federal Aviation Administration

Ardmore Municipal Airport (IATA: ADM, ICAO: KADM, FAA LID: ADM) is in Carter County, Oklahoma, 12 miles (19 km) northeast of the city of Ardmore, which owns it. It is near Gene Autry, Oklahoma. The National Plan of Integrated Airport Systems for 2011–2015 called it a general aviation airport.

== History ==
The airport is on the site of Ardmore Army Air Field (1942 to 1946), later Ardmore Air Force Base (1953 to 1959).

Central Airlines served Ardmore from about 1951 until 1963. Central listed the airport in their March 1, 1960 timetable as the Gene Autry Air Base, 13 miles north of the city, and the code as "AFD" at the time.

On April 22, 1966 American Flyers Airline Flight 280/D, flying a Lockheed Electra L-188 on approach to Ardmore crashed into a hill. 83 of the 98 aboard were killed, including the president of American Flyers who was piloting the aircraft. This was a flight under charter to the Military Air Command, en route from Monterey, California, to Columbus, Georgia, with a scheduled refueling stop at Ardmore. An autopsy showed that the pilot had suffered a massive heart attack during the attempted landing. He was not wearing his harness and slumped forward into the controls, which prevented the co-pilot from taking control. Subsequent investigation showed that the pilot was under treatment for arteriosclerosis and diabetes, but that he had falsified information on his application for a First Class Medical Certificate, which would have been denied except for the falsification.

== Facilities ==
Ardmore Municipal Airport covers 2,503 acres (1,013 ha) at an elevation of 777 feet (237 m). It has two runways: 13/31 is 9,002 by 150 feet (2,744 x 46 m) concrete and 17/35 is 5,007 by 100 feet (1,526 x 30 m) asphalt.

In the year ending July 2, 2009, the airport had 45,729 aircraft operations, average 125 per day: 80% general aviation and 20% military. 15 aircraft were then based at the airport: 40% single-engine, 13% multi-engine, and 47% jet.

The control tower is staffed under the federal contract tower program. The airport is staffed by the city of Ardmore. Full instrumentation, parking for up to 100 commercial sized aircraft and over 36,000 sq ft (3,300 m^{2}). of hangar space. The associated industrial park has over 2,900 acres (12 km^{2}), with a Burlington Northern Santa Fe spur.

Industries at the Airpark including King Aerospace, Higgins Interiors, Inc., Dollar General Distribution Center, East Jordan Iron Works, Carbonyx, Inc., and Online Packaging.

== See also ==
- List of airports in Oklahoma
