= List of Douglas DC-7 operators =

Douglas DC-7 operators
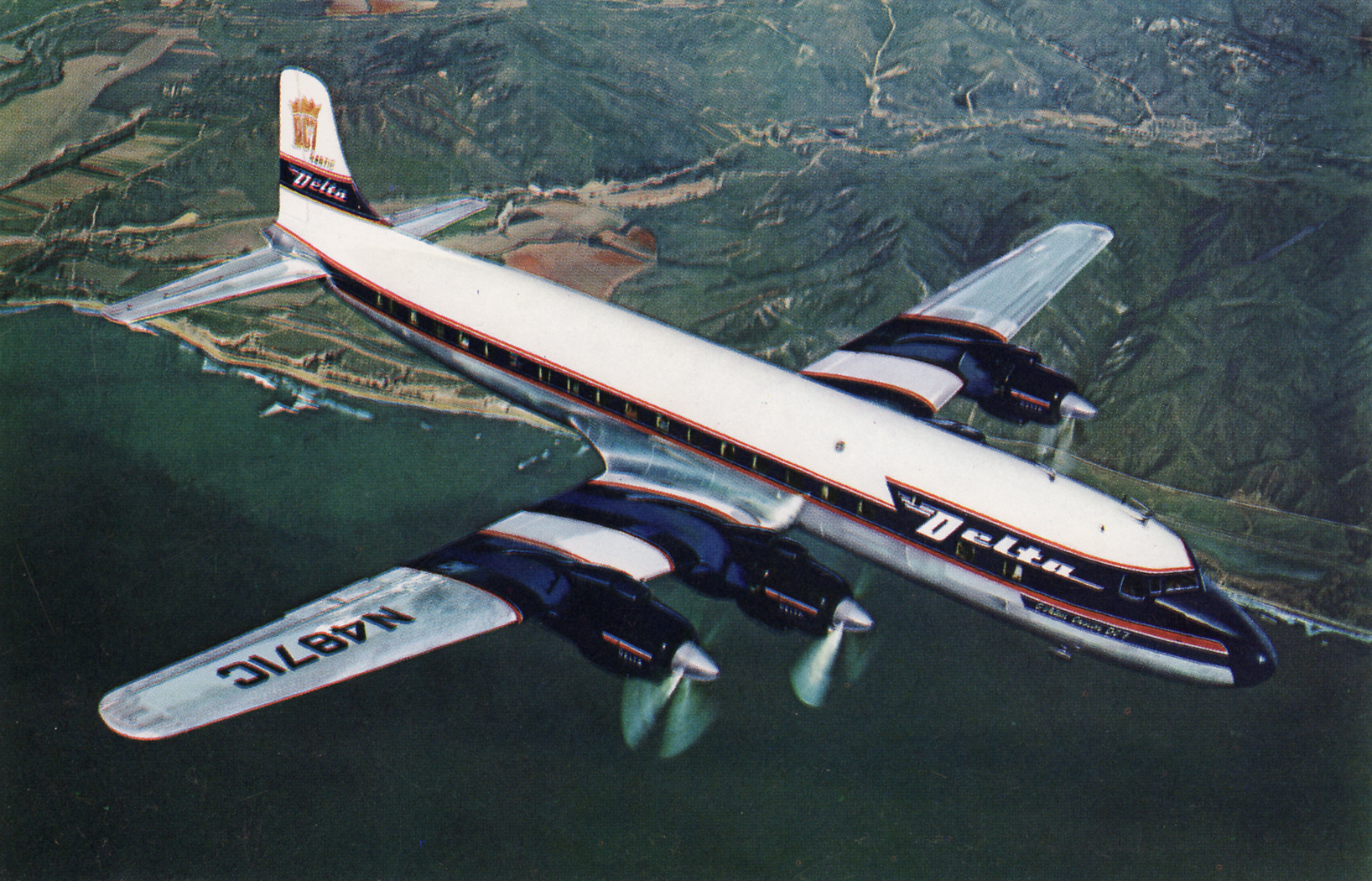
- Delta Air Lines DC-7

Operators of the Douglas DC-7 past and present:

== Civil operators ==
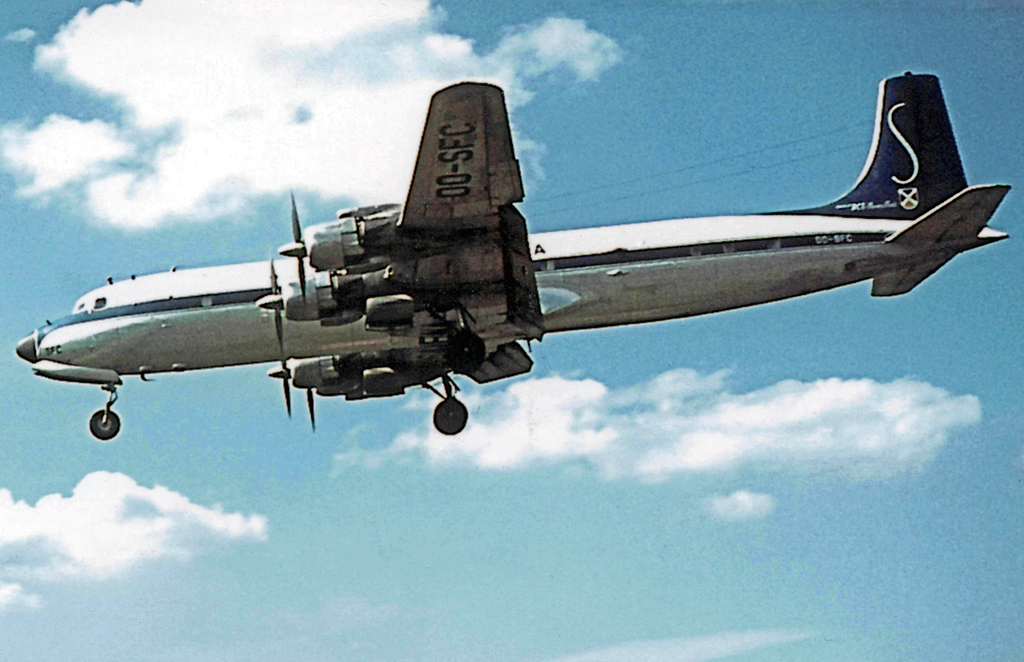
Sabena DC-7C operating a transatlantic service in 1962

Belgium

- SABENA - received 10 DC-7Cs as new build aircraft.

Bermuda

- ARCO Bermuda

Bolivia
Brazil

- Panair do Brasil - received 4 DC-7Cs as new build aircraft.

Canada

- Pacific Western Airlines

Colombia
Costa Rica
Denmark

- Conair
- Flying Enterprise
- Scandinavian Airlines System - received 14 DC-7Cs as new build aircraft.

Dominican Republic
Ecuador

- AREA Ecuador

France

- Transports Aériens Intercontinentaux - received 3 DC-7Cs as new build aircraft.
- Transports Aériens Réunis
- Union de Transports Aériens (UTA)

Gabon

- Affretair

Germany

- Atlantis
- Sudflug

Honduras

- Transportes Aéreos Nacionales (TAN Airlines)

Indonesia

- Penas Air Cargo

Iran

- Persian Air Services

Ireland

- Aer Turas
- Shannon Air

Italy

- Alitalia - received 6 DC-7Cs as new build aircraft.

Jamaica

- Air Caribbean Transport

Japan

- Japan Air Lines - received 4 DC-7Cs as new build aircraft.

Jordan

- Royal Jordanian Airlines

Lebanon

- Lebanese International Airways

Malawi
Mauritius
Mexico

- Mexicana - received 3 DC-7Cs as new build aircraft.

Netherlands

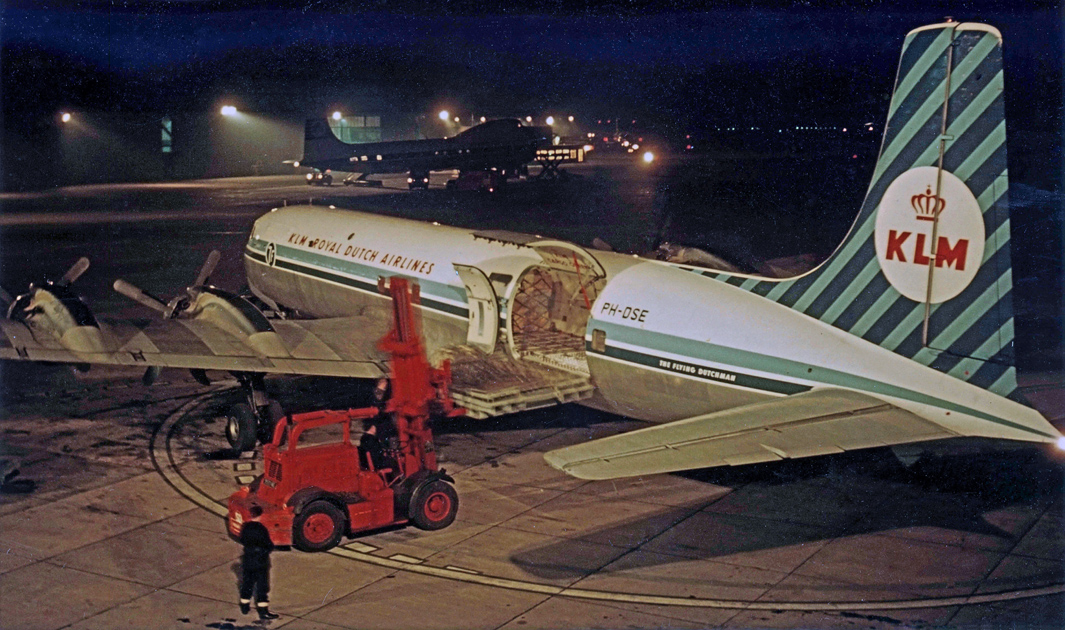
KLM DC-7CF freighter loading cargo in 1964

- KLM - received 15 DC-7Cs as new build aircraft.
- Martinair
- Schreiner Airways

Norway

- Scandinavian Airlines System

Panama

- Aerovías Panamá
- Talingo Airlines

Paraguay
Peru

- Aerolíneas Peruanas

Philippines

- Fleeming Air System Transport

Spain

- Spantax
- TAE – Trabajos Aéreos y Enlaces
- TASSA
- Transeuropa Compañía de Aviación

Rhodesia

- Affretair
- Air Trans Africa

South Africa

- South African Airways - received 4 DC-7Bs as new build aircraft.

Sweden

- Internord
- Ostermanair Charter
- Scandinavian Airlines System
- Swedish Red Cross
- Transair Sweden

Switzerland

- Swissair - received 5 DC-7Cs as new build aircraft.

Suriname
United Kingdom

- British Overseas Airways Corporation - received 10 DC-7Cs as new build aircraft.
- Caledonian Airways
- Dan-Air
- Trans Meridian

United States

- Aerovias Sud Americana (aka ASA International Airlines)
- Air Tankers
- AirClub International
- Airlift International
- American Airlines - received 34 DC-7s and 24 DC-7Bs as new build aircraft.
- Atlanta Skylarks
- Braniff Airways - received 7 DC-7Cs as new build aircraft.
- Continental Air Lines - received 6 DC-7Bs as new build aircraft.
- Delta Air Lines - received 10 DC-7s and 11 DC-7Bs as new build aircraft.
- Eastern Air Lines - received 50 DC-7Bs as new build aircraft.
- Federal Aviation Administration
- Interocean Airlines
- Liberty Air
- National Airlines - received 4 DC-7s and 4 DC-7Bs as new build aircraft.
- Nomads
- Northwest Orient Airlines - received 14 DC-7Cs as new build aircraft.
- Overseas National Airways
- Pan American-Grace Airways - received 6 DC-7Bs as new build aircraft.
- Pan American World Airways - received 7 DC-7Bs and 26 DC-7Cs as new build aircraft.
- Ports of Call Travel Club
- Riddle Airlines
- Saturn Airways
- Standard Airways
- United Airlines - received 57 DC-7s as new build aircraft.
- United States Forest Service
- Universal Airlines
- United States Overseas Airlines
- Vance International Airways
- World Airways
- Zantop Air Transport

== Military operators ==
Colombia

- Colombian Air Force 1 x DC-7B and 1 x DC-7C

France

- French Air Force 3 x DC-7C used for supporting French nuclear weapon tests and later tracking satellites.

Mexico

- Mexican Air Force 1 x DC-7B

Nigeria

- Nigerian Air Force - 1 × DC-7C briefly operated in 1968 during the Biafran War

Rhodesia

- Rhodesian Air Force 1 x DC-7C
