= Douglas DC-7B N836D =

Aircraft

DC-7B N836D
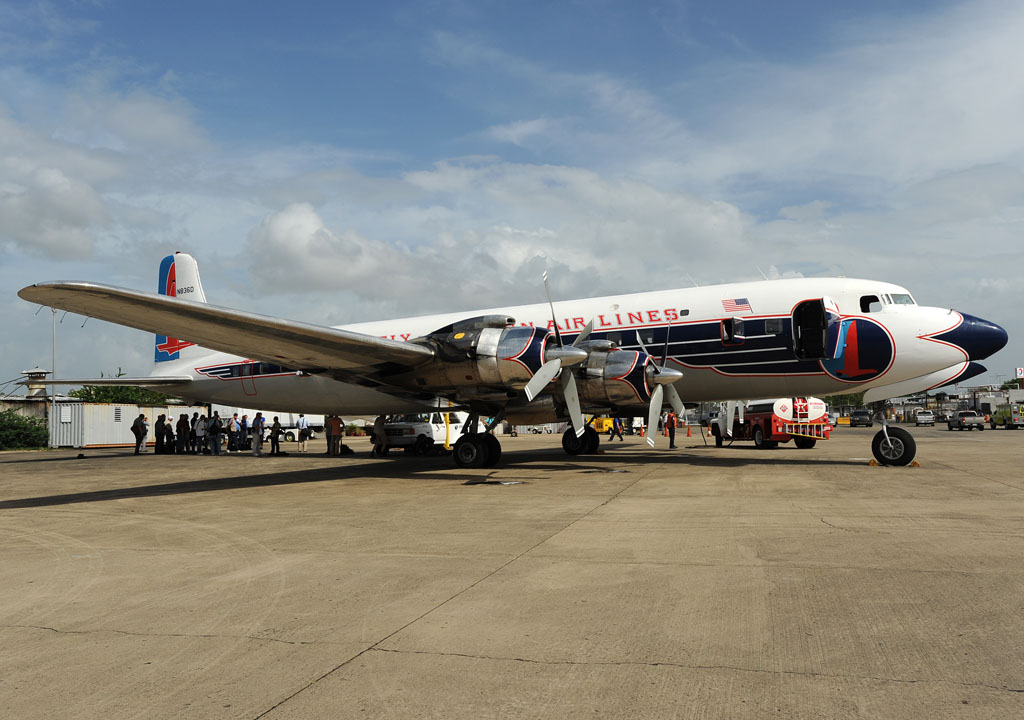
- N836D at San Juan International Airport on May 16, 2011

General information
- Type: Douglas DC-7B
- Manufacturer: Douglas
- Owners: Historical Flight Foundation
- Construction number: 45345
- Registration: N836D

History
- Manufactured: 1957
- Preserved at: Sullenberger Aviation Museum located at the Charlotte Douglas International Airport, Charlotte, North Carolina

N836D is a former Eastern Air Lines Douglas DC-7B restored to flying condition and previously operated from Miami-Opa Locka Executive Airport, in Opa-locka, Florida. The aircraft's airworthiness certificate expired in June 2013 and it remains at the Sullenberger Aviation Museum located at the Charlotte Douglas International Airport on static display.

== History ==
The aircraft (serial number 45345, line number 928) was originally delivered on January 23, 1958. It flew with Eastern as an airliner in scheduled service until retirement in 1965, when it was sold to California Airmotive, a used aircraft dealer. California Airmotive sold the aircraft to Detroit-based Nomads air travel club in 1966. The club used it until the early 1970s when it was replaced by a Lockheed Electra. After retirement by Nomads, it was parked at Detroit's Metropolitan Wayne County Airport until 1972 when it was sold again to Joe Kocour and flown to St. Paul's Downtown Airport/Holman Field. It stayed there unused for 32 years, with the owners occasionally running the engines but never flying the airplane. In November 2003, it was sold to two aviation enthusiasts who prepared the aircraft for a ferry flight to their hometown of Miami, where restoration could begin in earnest at their home base of Opa-locka Executive Airport.

After a lot of work was done and the aircraft was once again airworthy, an FAA Ferry Permit was issued and the aircraft departed St. Paul for Opa-locka on 7 August 2004. A major restoration of the aircraft was completed by late 2009.

In October 2007, the FAA issued a ruling that allowed historically significant aircraft to carry passengers. The program was developed to allow owners of these aircraft to generate funds for the preservation of their aircraft by offering flights to the general public. There are a number of groups offering flights on World War II bomber aircraft but the DC-7B is the largest aircraft in the program.

But many new safety regulations were in effect. Interior materials were upgraded so as to meet new fire standards. Egress slides were installed. Seats had to be replaced, but the original seats are preserved in storage for the day the aircraft is again grounded. Likewise, the original design had hat shelves that are now preserved in storage.

By September 2009, the restoration was finished, and the aircraft was painted in a vintage Eastern Air Lines livery. Final adjustments and FAA inspections and paperwork were completed by July 2010, and the aircraft made its first post-restoration flight on July 4, 2010. Since then, the aircraft has been flown to airshows throughout the United States, including EAA AirVenture in Oshkosh, Thunder over Michigan and Sun 'n Fun in Lakeland, Florida. In May 2011, it completed its first international flight when it flew round-trip between Miami and St. Maarten. On November 18, 2011, the aircraft flew from Opa-locka, Florida to Charlotte, North Carolina with Captain "Sully" Sullenberger and first officer Jeff Skiles on board as a charity flight. On landing in Charlotte, the crew and passengers toured the "Miracle on the Hudson" aircraft, US Air flight 1549, that landed in the Hudson in 2009. On the return flight to Florida, without Captain Sully or Skiles on board, the aircraft lost the number 3 engine on takeoff and returned to Charlotte for an uneventful landing.

In early 2013, the aircraft experienced a failure after takeoff on its number three engine, and it made an emergency landing at Charlotte Douglas International Airport. It remains on temporary static display at the Carolinas Aviation Museum as of November 2014, awaiting return to flight.
