= Flight 618 =

Flight 618 may refer to:

- Alitalia Flight 618, crashed on 26 February 1960
- Linjeflyg Flight 618, crashed on 15 January 1977
