= Northwest Orient Airlines Flight 293 =

1963 aviation accident

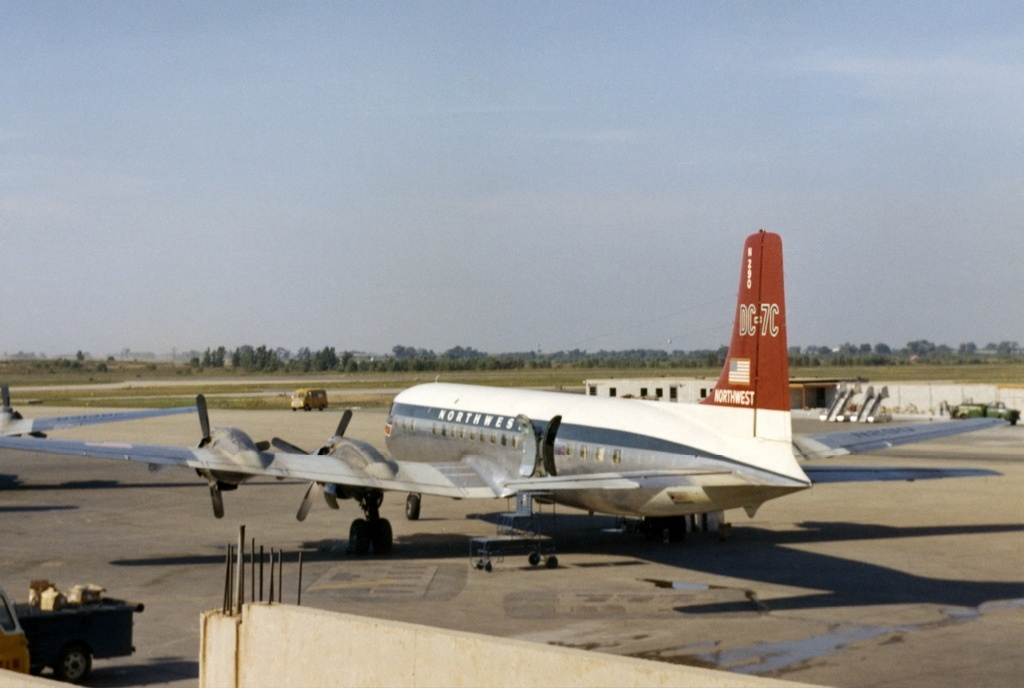
- N290, the Douglas DC-7 involved, photographed at Chicago O'Hare Int'l Airport in September 1959

Occurrence
- Date: June 3, 1963
- Summary: Unknown
- Site: Clarence Strait, WSW of Annette Island, Alaska; 54.2138°N 133.857°W

Aircraft
- Aircraft type: Douglas DC-7C
- Operator: Northwest Orient Airlines
- Registration: N290
- Flight origin: McChord Air Force Base, Washington, United States
- Destination: Elmendorf Air Force Base, Alaska, United States
- Occupants: 101
- Passengers: 95
- Crew: 6
- Fatalities: 101
- Survivors: 0

Northwest Orient Airlines Flight 293 was an American military charter operated on June 3, 1963, by a Northwest Orient Airlines Douglas DC-7C registered N290. The aircraft crashed into the sea off the coast of Alaska, resulting in the deaths of all 101 crew and passengers on board. It was the airline's deadliest disaster until the crash of Northwest Airlines Flight 255 24 years later.

== Accident ==
Flight 293 was chartered by the Military Air Transport Service of the United States Air Force to carry 95 servicemen and their families from McChord Air Force Base in Washington state to Elmendorf Air Force Base in Alaska. The DC-7 departed McChord at 07:52 Pacific Standard Time. The last radio contact with the plane was at 10:06, when the crew requested a change of flight level. When nothing more had been heard for more than an hour, a search for the aircraft was begun at 11:16. It was not until 19:22 that floating debris was seen 182.5 miles (293.7 km) WSW of Annette Island, Alaska.

Approximately 1,500 pounds of wreckage was recovered, including life vests still encased in their plastic containers and extremely deformed seat frames. None of the bodies of the crew or passengers were ever recovered.

== Investigation ==
With the wreckage under 8,000 feet of water, the Accident Review Board concluded that "because of a lack of evidence, the Board is unable to determine the probable cause of the accident."
