= Northwest Orient Airlines Flight 1-11 =

1960 aviation accident

Northwest Orient Airlines Flight 1–11
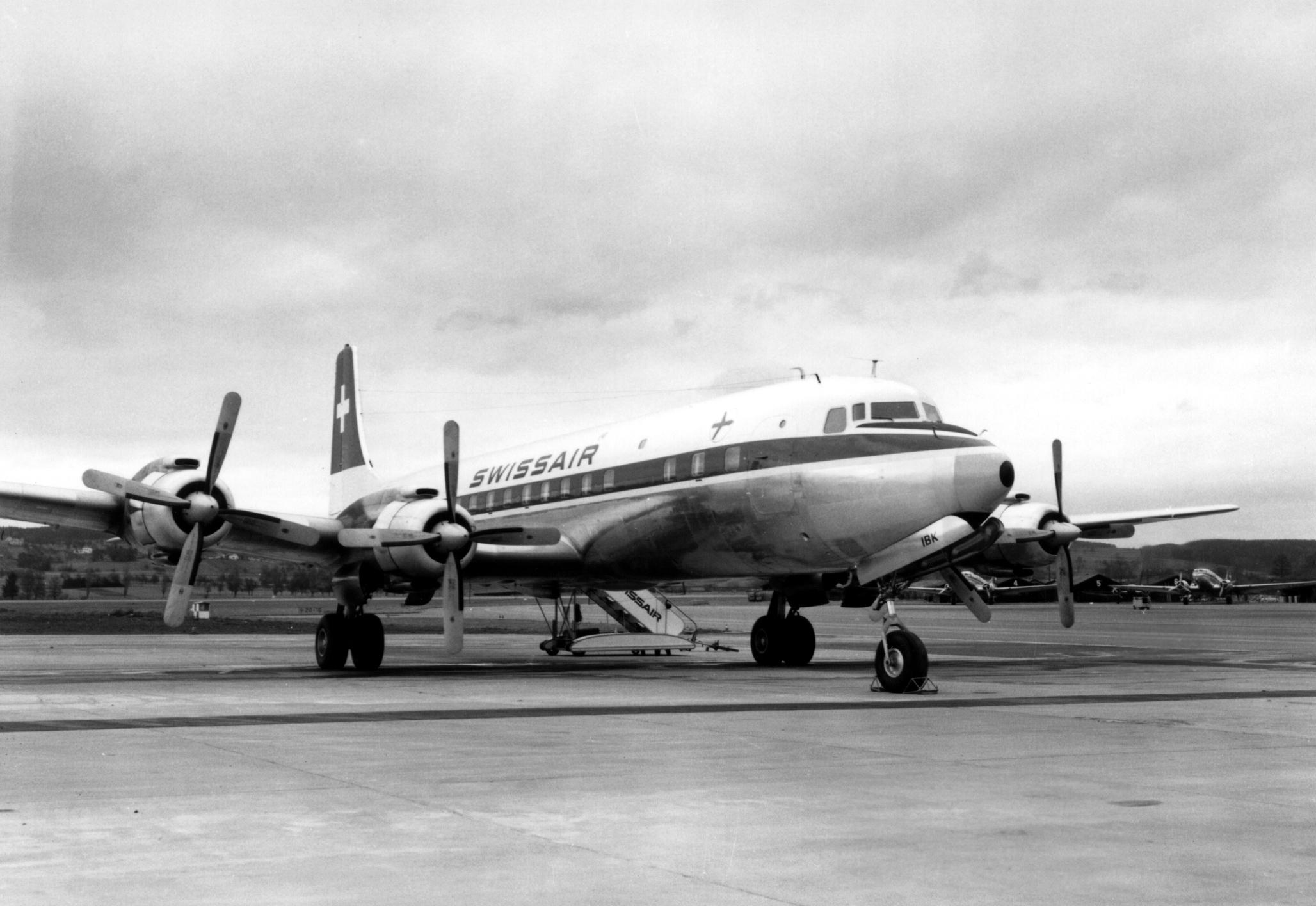
- A Swissair Douglas DC-7, similar to the aircraft involved in the accident.

Accident
- Date: July 14, 1960
- Summary: Ditching after an in-flight engine failure and fire
- Site: 8 km (5.0 mi) northeast off Polillo Island, Philippines

Aircraft
- Aircraft type: Douglas DC-7C
- Operator: Northwest Orient Airlines
- Registration: N292
- Flight origin: Idlewild Airport, New York, United States
- Stopover: Seattle–Tacoma International Airport, Washington, United States
- 1st stopover: Anchorage International Airport, Alaska, United States
- 2nd stopover: Tokyo International Airport, Japan
- 3rd stopover: Okinawa-Naha Airport (OKA/ROAH), Japan
- Destination: Manila International Airport (MNL/RPLL), Philippines
- Occupants: 58
- Passengers: 51
- Crew: 7
- Fatalities: 1
- Injuries: 44
- Survivors: 57

Northwest Orient Airlines Flight 1–11 was a Northwest Orient Airlines flight from New York City to Manila, with stopovers in Seattle, Anchorage, Tokyo, and Okinawa. On July 14, 1960, the Douglas DC-7C serving the flight ditched in the ocean 8 km (5.0 mi) northeast off Polillo Island, Quezon, Philippines. Of the 58 people on board, 57 survived with 44 suffering from minor injuries and 1 passenger losing her life.

== Accident ==
In the evening of July 13, 1960, at 11:25 pm, Flight 1–11 landed at Okinawa-Naha Airport on the Japanese island of Okinawa, which was its last intended stopover of its journey from New York City, United States, to Manila, Philippines. The other stopovers included the American cities of Seattle, Washington, and Anchorage, Alaska, as well as Japan's capital Tokyo.

The aircraft was prepared for the last leg of its journey to Manila and took off from Okinawa-Naha Airport at 1:12 am on July 14. Around two hours after takeoff at 3:15 am, the No. 2 engine underwent a sudden loss of power which was indicated to the plane's crew by a drop in mean effective pressure and manifold pressure. The crew believed that the origin of the problem lay with carburetor icing and so took action to correct the issue. When no improvement was made to the situation of the No. 2 engine, the captain noticed the oil-out temperature of the engine rising. The crew thereafter attempted to feather the propeller of the No. 2 engine, but failed numerous times. Following the ongoing engine troubles, the flight was cleared to descend from FL180 18,000 ft (5,500 m) to FL100 10,000 ft (3,000 m). The crew declared an emergency at 3:40 am while descending to 9,000 ft (2,700 m). In an effort to halt the rotation of the No. 2 engine, the crew attempted to activate the firewall shutoff valve so the engine would be deprived of lubricant. As a result, the engine's propeller separated from the engine and slashed a 15-inch (380 mm) hole in the plane's fuselage. More damage was reported by a continuous fire alarm, alerting the crew to a fire in the No. 2 engine which had also spread to the wing. The crew informed Manila of their predicament at 4:20 am before the plane undertook a rapid descent which was lessened in intensity when the plane reached an altitude of 1,000 ft (300 m). The crew was forced to ditch the aircraft in the Pacific Ocean about 124.7 km (77.5 mi) northeast of Manila and 8 km (5.0 mi) northeast off Polillo Island, Quezon, Philippines. Upon hitting the water at 4:30 am, the tail of the aircraft sheared off along with the right wing and all engines.

The right wing remained afloat for three hours following the crash, working as a makeshift liferaft for many survivors, while the remainder of the aircraft sank between 8 and 10 minutes after the ditching. The survivors were ultimately rescued by the US Coast Guard and US Navy some four to six hours after the crash. Of the 58 passengers and crew, 57 survived with 44 suffering minor injuries. A single passenger died when the propeller of the No. 2 engine slashed through the plane's fuselage and struck her.

== Aircraft ==
The Douglas DC-7C involved, N292 (msn 45462/925) was built in 1958 and was used by Northwest Orient Airlines from 1958 until its destruction in 1960.

== Aftermath ==
The aircraft was torn apart by the impact, with the wreckage sinking to the bottom of the Pacific. An investigation of the accident concluded that an internal failure of the No. 2 engine had caused the plane's oil supply to be contaminated, resulting in a loss of oil supply. Therefore the loss caused the subsequent damage to the engine which ended with the propeller detaching after its assembly was disturbed, and an engine fire that spread to the plane's wing. Ultimately, the damage to the fuselage and wing made a ditching of the aircraft necessary.
