= 1957 Pacoima mid-air collision =

Mid-air collision over Pacoima, California, United States

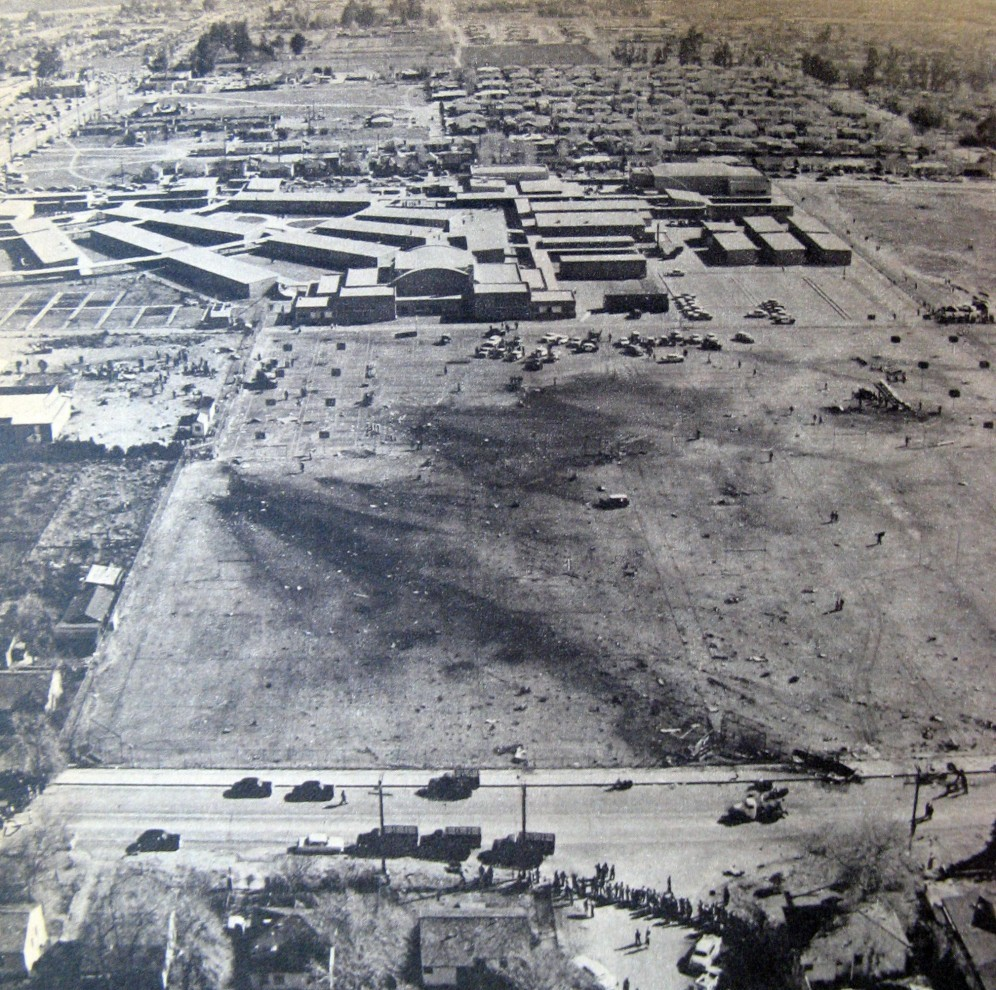
- Crash site

Accident
- Date: January 31, 1957
- Summary: Mid-air collision
- Site: Over the San Fernando Valley, California, United States; 34°15′03″N 118°25′35″W
- Total fatalities: 8
- Total injuries: 78 (estimated)

First aircraft
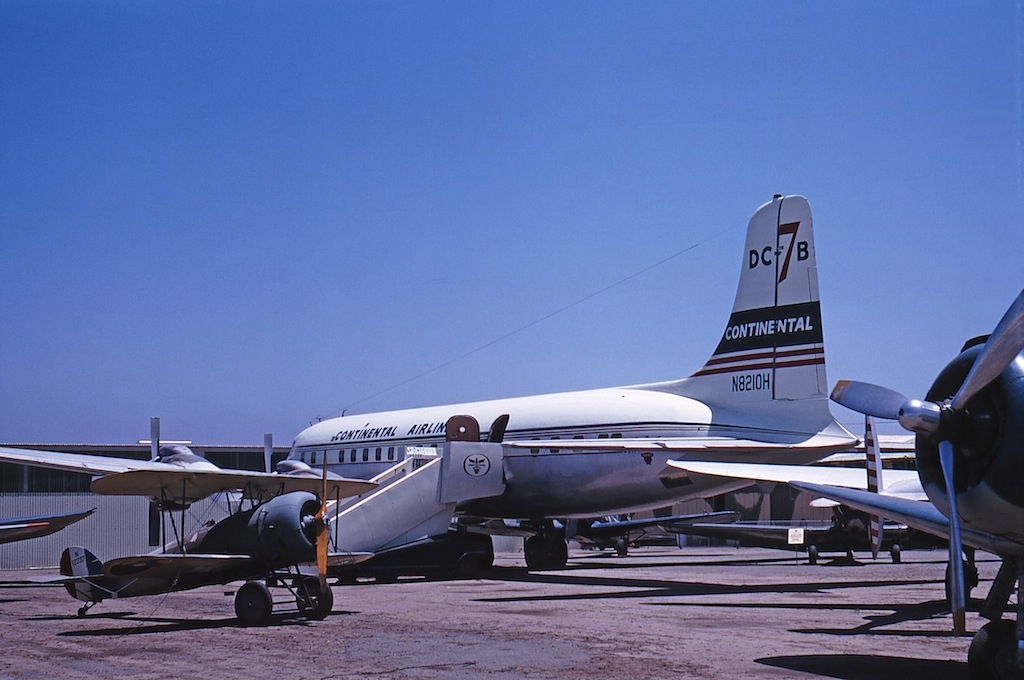
- Continental's second N8210H, also a DC-7B similar to the accident aircraft and delivered a few months after the incident
- Type: Douglas DC-7B
- Operator: Douglas Aircraft Company
- Registration: N8210H
- Flight origin: Santa Monica Airport, Santa Monica, California, United States
- Destination: Santa Monica Airport, Santa Monica, California, United States
- Occupants: 4
- Crew: 4
- Fatalities: 4
- Survivors: 0

Second aircraft
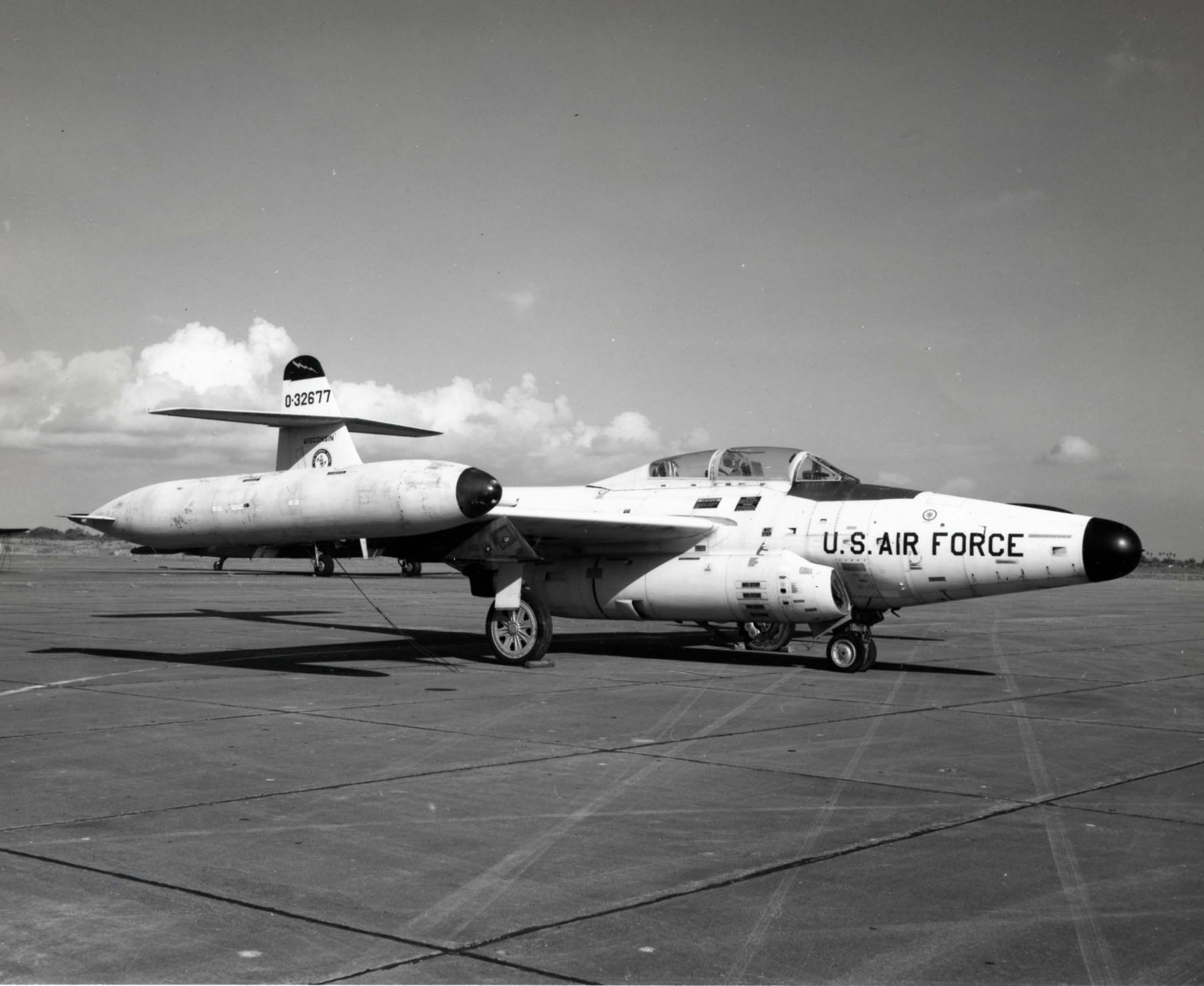
- A Northrop F-89J Scorpion of the Wisconsin Air National Guard's 176th Fighter Interceptor Squadron in October 1972.
- Type: Northrop F-89J Scorpion
- Operator: United States Air Force
- Registration: 52-1870
- Flight origin: Palmdale, California, United States
- Destination: Palmdale, California, United States
- Occupants: 2
- Crew: 2
- Fatalities: 1
- Injuries: 1
- Survivors: 1

Ground casualties
- Ground fatalities: 3
- Ground injuries: 74 (estimated)

On January 31, 1957, a Douglas DC-7B operated by Douglas Aircraft Company was involved in a mid-air collision with a United States Air Force Northrop F-89 Scorpion and crashed into the schoolyard of Pacoima Junior High School located in Pacoima, a suburban area in the San Fernando Valley of Los Angeles, California.

== Accident ==
The DC-7B, which was earmarked for delivery to Continental Airlines, took off from the Santa Monica Airport at 10:15 a.m. on its first functional test flight, with a crew of four Douglas personnel aboard, including former actor Archie Twitchell. Meanwhile, in Palmdale to the north, a pair of two-seater F-89J fighter jets took off at 10:50 a.m. on test flights, one that involved a check of their on-board radar equipment. Both jets and the DC-7B were performing their individual tests at an altitude of 25,000 feet (7,600 m) in clear skies over the San Fernando Valley when, at about 11:18 a.m., a high-speed, near-head-on midair collision occurred. Investigators were later able to determine that the two aircraft most likely converged at a point over an area northeast of the Hansen Dam spillway.

Following the collision, Curtiss Adams, the radarman aboard the eastbound twin-engine F-89J Scorpion, was able to bail out of the stricken fighter jet and, despite incurring severe burns, parachuted to a landing on a garage roof in Burbank, breaking his leg when he fell to the ground. The fighter jet's pilot, Roland E. Owen, died when the aircraft plummeted in flames into La Tuna Canyon in the Verdugo Mountains.

The DC-7B, with a portion of its left wing shorn off, remained airborne for about 20 seconds. It rolled to the left and began an uncontrollable, spiraling, high-velocity dive earthward. In doing so, it began raining debris onto the Pacoima neighborhoods below as the aircraft began to break apart. Seconds later, part of the hurtling wreckage slammed onto the grounds of the Pacoima Congregational Church, killing all four Douglas crew members aboard while the major portions exploded above and slammed onto the adjacent playground of Pacoima Junior High School. On the school playground, where 220 boys were ending their outdoor athletic activities, the wreckage broke upon explosion and impact into numerous pieces, and intense fires began due to the aircraft's fuel and oil. Distinct craters were made in the playground by each of the four engines and the main center fuselage section. Two students were struck and killed by this wreckage and debris. A third gravely injured student died two days later in a local hospital. An estimated 75 more students on the school playground suffered critical and minor injuries.

The collision was blamed on pilot error and the failure of both aircraft crews to exercise proper "see and avoid" procedures regarding other aircraft while operating under visual flight rules (VFR). The crash also prompted the Civil Aeronautics Board (CAB) to set restrictions on all aircraft test flights, both military and civilian, requiring that they be made over open water or specifically approved sparsely populated areas.

== Media representation ==
The event is depicted in the film La Bamba, the 1987 biopic of rock 'n' roll figure Ritchie Valens, who was a 15-year-old student at Pacoima Junior High School at the time of the disaster but was not at school that day because he was attending the funeral of his grandfather.

Recurring nightmares of the disaster led to Valens' fear of flying, which he overcame after he launched his music career. Valens was killed in a plane crash two years later, along with fellow rock 'n' rollers Buddy Holly and The Big Bopper as well as pilot Roger Peterson, when their chartered Beechcraft Bonanza crashed near Mason City, Iowa, early in the morning of February 3, 1959. However, in the nightmare sequences of the film, the first collision was portrayed by two general aviation aircraft (one of which was the Beechcraft Bonanza, the model in which Valens actually died), as opposed to the aircraft in the actual disaster.

The 1957 crash was discussed on the May 19, 1957, episode of The CBS Radio Workshop (entitled "Heaven Is In the Sky"). The program described when and how both planes took off from their respective airfields, and included discussion of how the Pacoima Junior High School was having the 7th-grade students outside for exercise. It also included interviews with people who were witnesses and/or affected by the crash.

== See also ==
- Archie Twitchell
