= 1988 T&G Aviation DC-7 incident =

Aviation accident in Morocco

Coordinates: 31.7916°N 7.0925°W

The T&G Aviation DC-7 incident was a civil aviation disaster that occurred on Thursday 8 December 1988. Two DC-7 planes flying on a locust-control mission on behalf of the United States Agency for International Development were attacked en-route from Senegal to Morocco by POLISARIO troops who may have mistaken them for Moroccan military C-130 aircraft.

Both planes were hit by 9K32 Strela-2 MANPADS missiles. One crashed, killing all 5 on board, the other managed to land despite losing an engine

== Incident ==
Both Planes were following their flight plane on Airway Red 975 at an altitude of 11,000 ft (3.4 km) and were flying 1.5 mi (2.4 km) apart. The planes were attacked with 9K32 Strela-2 missiles by POLISARIO troops. The main aircraft (N284) lost an engine and a wing, and then crashed near the Moroccan Western Sahara Wall, killing all 5 crew members on board. The other aircraft (N90804) lost an engine and a part of a wing but managed to land in Sidi Ifni. American sources stated that it is possible that the attackers mistook the planes for Moroccan military aircraft.
