= Douglas DC-7 =

US airliner with 4 piston engines, 1953

DC-7
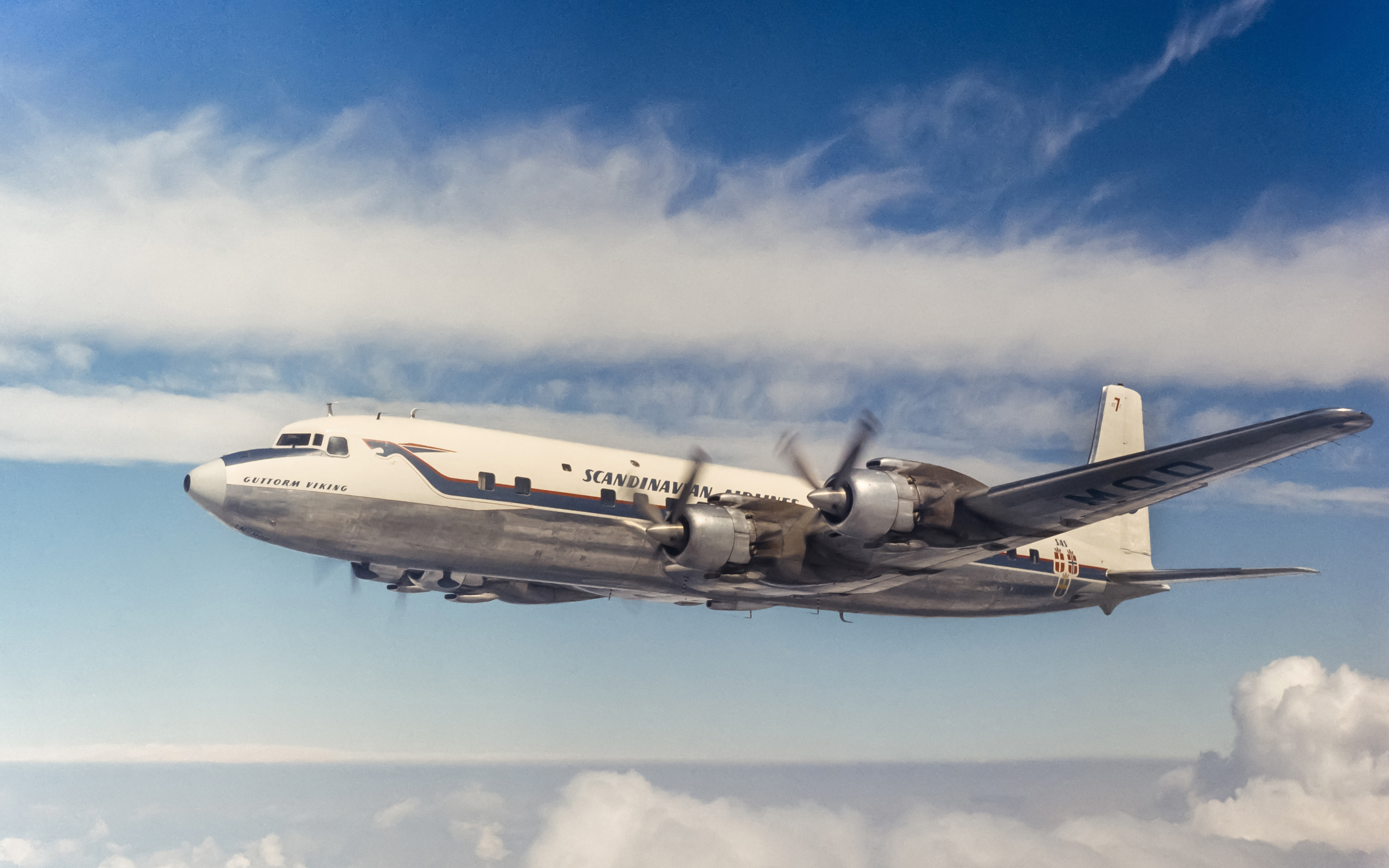
- SAS Douglas DC-7C Guttorm Viking in flight in 1957

General information
- Type: Airliner and transport aircraft
- National origin: United States
- Manufacturer: Douglas Aircraft Company
- Status: Retired
- Primary users: American Airlines (historical) United Airlines (historical); Eastern Air Lines (historical); Pan Am (historical)
- Number built: 338

History
- Manufactured: 1953–1958
- Introduction date: 29 November 1953
- First flight: 18 May 1953
- Retired: October 2020
- Developed from: Douglas DC-6

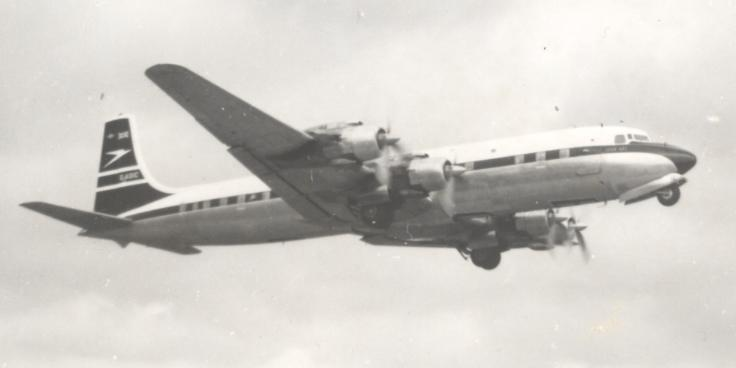
BOAC DC-7C

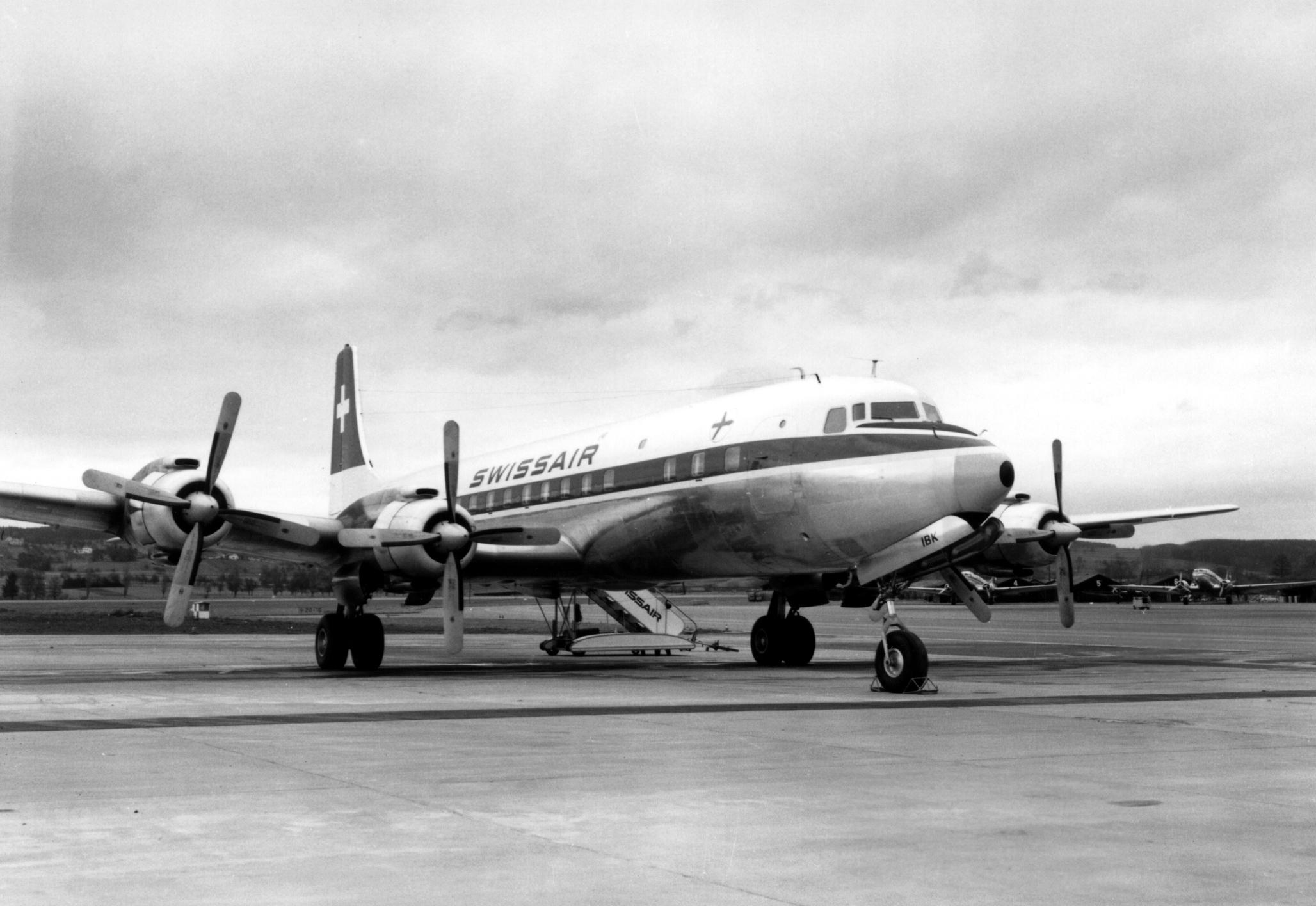
Swissair DC-7C in 1961

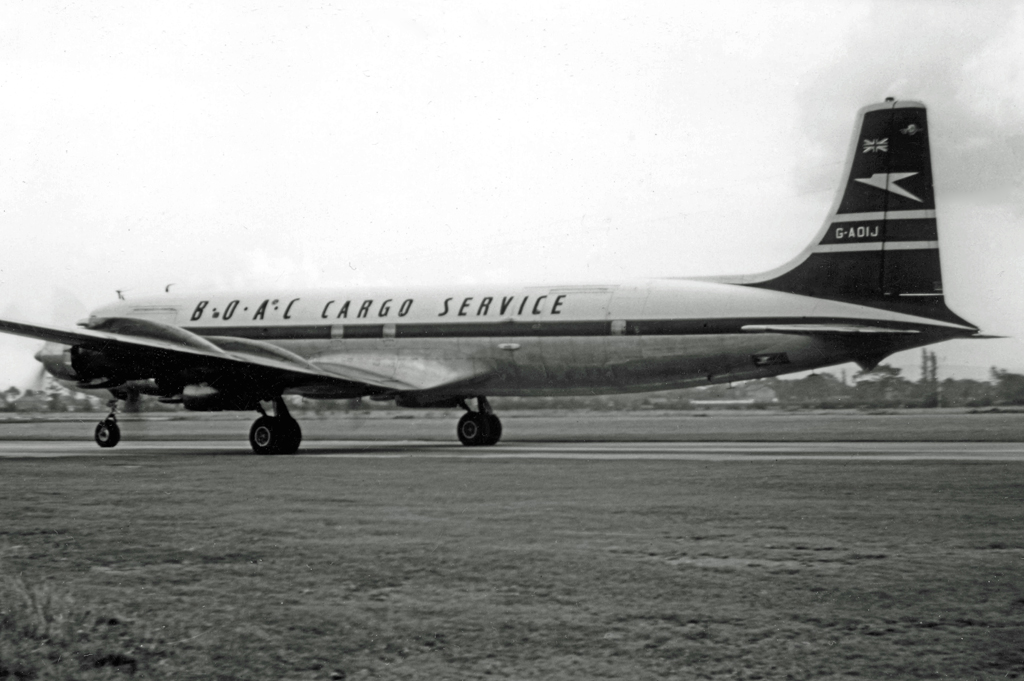
DC-7CF freighter of BOAC in 1961 converted with forward and rear freight doors

The Douglas DC-7 is a retired American airliner built by the Douglas Aircraft Company from 1953 to 1958. A derivative of the DC-6, it was the last major piston engine-powered passenger aircraft made by Douglas, being developed shortly after the earliest jet airliner, the de Havilland Comet, entered service and only a few years before the jet-powered Douglas DC-8 first flew in 1958. A large number of both DC-7B and DC-7C variants were also built, with a handful of aircraft converted for the purpose of cargo hauling or fire-fighting after their commercial transport days had passed.

Unlike other propeller-driven Douglas aircraft that were far more successful, such as the DC-3 and DC-6, no examples of the DC-7 remain in service as of 2020.

== Design and development ==
In 1945, Pan American World Airways requested a DC-7, a civil version of the Douglas C-74 Globemaster military transport. Pan Am soon canceled their order. That proposed DC-7 was unrelated to the later DC-6-derived airliner.

American Airlines revived the designation when they requested an aircraft that could fly across the United States coast-to-coast non-stop in about eight hours. (Civil Air Regulations then limited domestic flight crews to 8 hours' flight time in any 24-hour period.) Douglas was reluctant to build the aircraft until American Airlines president C. R. Smith ordered 25 at a total price of $40 million, thus covering Douglas' development costs.

The DC-7 wing was based on that of the DC-4 and DC-6, with the same span; the fuselage was 40 inches (100 cm) longer than the DC-6B. Four eighteen-cylinder Wright R-3350 Duplex-Cyclone Turbo-Compound engines provided power. The prototype flew in May 1953 and American received their first DC-7 in November, inaugurating the first non-stop east-coast-to-west-coast service in the country (unrealistically scheduled just under the eight-hour limit for one crew) and forcing rival TWA to offer a similar service with its Super Constellations. Both aircraft frequently experienced inflight engine failures, causing many flights to be diverted. Some blamed this on the need for high-power settings to meet the national schedules, causing overheating and failure of the engines' power recovery turbines.

=== DC-7B ===
The DC-7 was followed by the DC-7B with slightly more power and optional fuel tanks over the wing in the rear of the engine nacelles (selected by Pan Am and South African Airways), each carrying 220 US gallons (833 L; 183 imp gal). South African Airways used this variant to fly Johannesburg to London with one stop. Pan Am's DC-7Bs started flying transatlantic in summer 1955, scheduled 1 hr 45 min faster than the Super Stratocruiser from New York to London or Paris.

=== DC-7C ===
Early DC-7s were purchased only by U.S. carriers. European carriers could not take advantage of the small range-increase of the early DC-7, so Douglas released an extended-range variant, the DC-7C (Seven Seas) in 1956. Two 5 ft (1.5 m) wingroot inserts added fuel capacity, reduced interference drag and made the cabin quieter by moving the engines farther outboard; the optional nacelle fuel tanks previously seen on Pan American's and South African's DC-7Bs were made standard. The fuselage, which had been extended over the DC-6Bs with a 40-inch (100 cm) plug behind the wing for the DC-7 and DC-7B, was lengthened again with a 40-inch plug ahead of the wing to give the DC-7C a total length of 112 ft 3 in (34.21 m).

== Operational history ==
Since the late 1940s Pan Am and other airlines had scheduled a few non-stop flights from New York to Europe, but westward non-stops against the prevailing wind were rarely possible with an economic payload. The Lockheed Super Constellation and DC-7B that appeared in 1955 could occasionally make the westward trip, but in summer 1956 Pan Am's DC-7C finally started doing it fairly reliably. BOAC was forced to respond by purchasing DC-7Cs rather than wait on the delivery of the Bristol Britannia. The DC-7C found its way into several other overseas airlines' fleets, including SAS, which used them on cross-polar flights to North America and Asia. The DC-7C sold better than its rival, the Lockheed L-1649A Starliner, which entered service a year later, but sales were cut short by the arrival of Boeing 707 and Douglas DC-8 jets in 1958-60.

Starting in 1959 Douglas began converting DC-7s and DC-7Cs into DC-7F freighters to extend their useful lives. The airframes were fitted with large forward and rear freight doors and some cabin windows were removed.

The predecessor DC-6, especially the DC-6B, established a reputation for straightforward engineering and reliability. Pratt & Whitney, manufacturer of the DC-6s Double Wasp engines, did not offer an effective larger engine apart from the Wasp Major. Douglas turned to Wright Aeronautical for a more powerful engine. The Duplex-Cyclone had reliability issues, and this affected the DC-7's service record. Carriers who had both DC-6s and DC-7s in their fleets usually replaced the newer DC-7s first once jets started to arrive. Some airlines retired their DC-7s after little more than five years of service, whereas most DC-6s lasted longer and sold more readily on the secondhand market.

Morten Beyer, an airline executive who participated in the decision to buy second-hand DC-7s at Riddle Airlines (later known as Airlift International), said Riddle became comfortable with buying the DC-7, notwithstanding known engine problems, after seeing its success with carriers like Swissair that made an effort to "baby" the Wright engine. According to Beyer, many passenger carriers had competed on speed and operated the engine at its limits, where it tended to break down. Riddle apparently was able to operate the DC-7 reliably by similarly babying the engine.

Basic price of a new DC-7 was around $823,308 (£570,000).

Price of a DC-7B was around $982,226 (£680,000) in 1955, rising to $1,184,490 (£820,000) in 1957.

Similarly, the price of a DC-7C was $1,155,560 (£800,000) in 1956, increasing to $1,343,385 (£930,000) by 1958.

Cost of the DC-7F "Speedfreighter" conversion was around $166,112 (£115,000) per aircraft.

== Variants ==
DC-7
Initial production variant, 105 built. Sometimes known as DC-7A.
DC-7B
First long-range variant with higher gross weight and fuel capacity, with most of the added fuel in optional saddle tanks in enlarged engine nacelles. (Only Pan Am and South African DC-7Bs had the saddle tanks.) 112 built.
DC-7C Seven Seas
Longer-range variant with non-stop transatlantic capability. Stretched fuselage and longer-span wings. Fitted with more powerful 3,400 hp (2,500 kW) R-3350 engines and increased fuel capacity in wing and nacelle saddle tanks. 121 built.
DC-7D
Proposed turboprop development powered by four Rolls-Royce RB.109 engines. It was considered by BOAC in 1954, but no order was placed and the aircraft was not built.

=== Freighter conversions ===
DC-7-series aircraft were converted for main-deck cargo service in several configurations. FAA-approved conversions included the DC-7B Cargo and DC-7C cargo configurations; some original DC-7 aircraft were converted and redesignated as DC-7B Cargo. Conversions varied, but could include a large main-deck cargo door and cargo floors; certain aircraft were additionally modified to meet Class E main-cabin cargo-compartment requirements.

== Operators ==
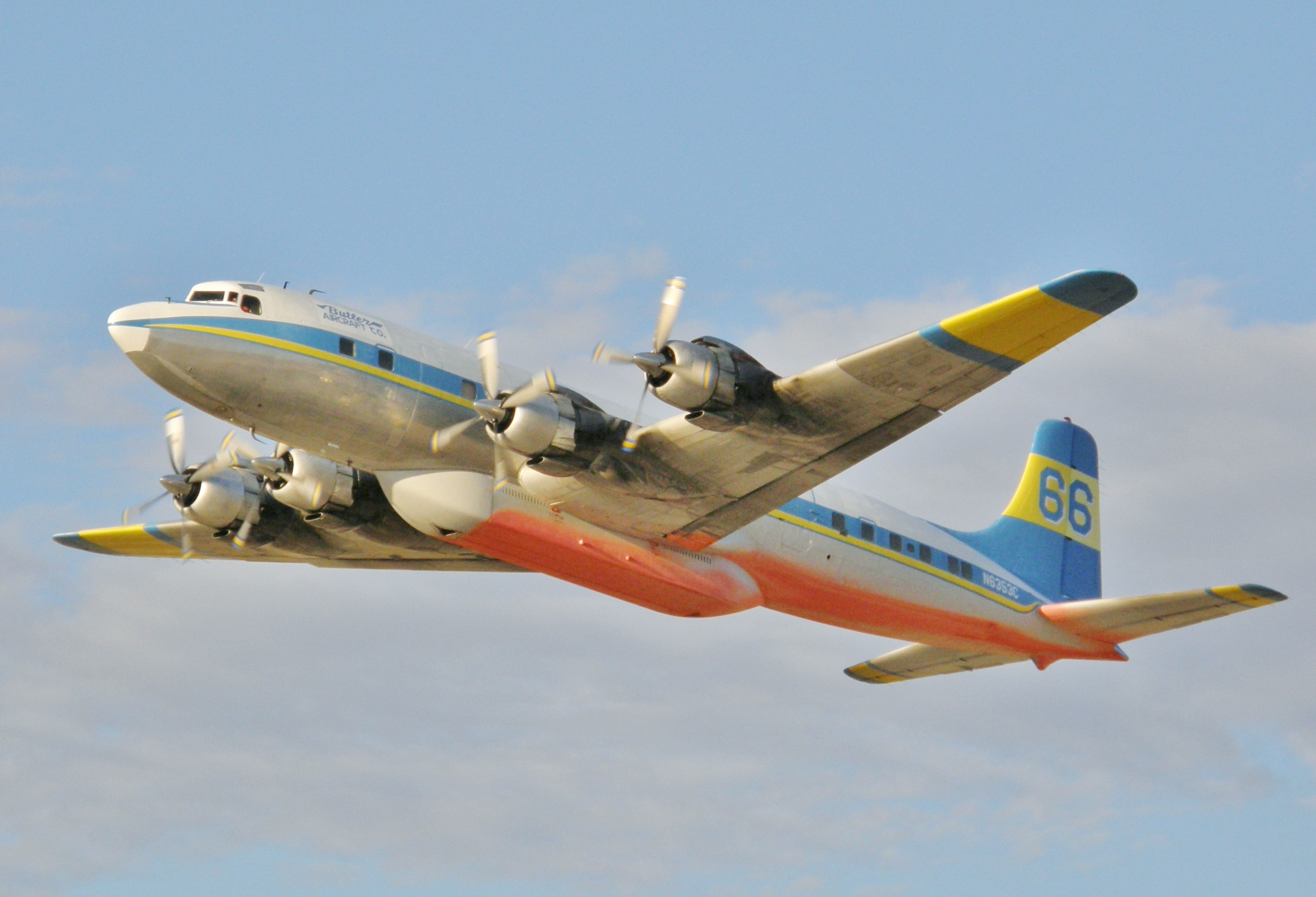
Butler Aircraft Services' DC-7, Tanker 66, 2007

=== Airlines ===
DC-7s were used by Alitalia, American Airlines, BOAC, Braniff Airways, Caledonian Airways, Delta Air Lines, Eastern Air Lines, Flying Tigers, Japan Airlines, KLM, Mexicana de Aviacion, National Airlines, Northwest Orient, Panair do Brasil, Pan American World Airways, Riddle Airlines, Sabena, SAS, South African Airways, Swissair, Turkish Airlines, Transports Aériens Intercontinentaux, and United Airlines.

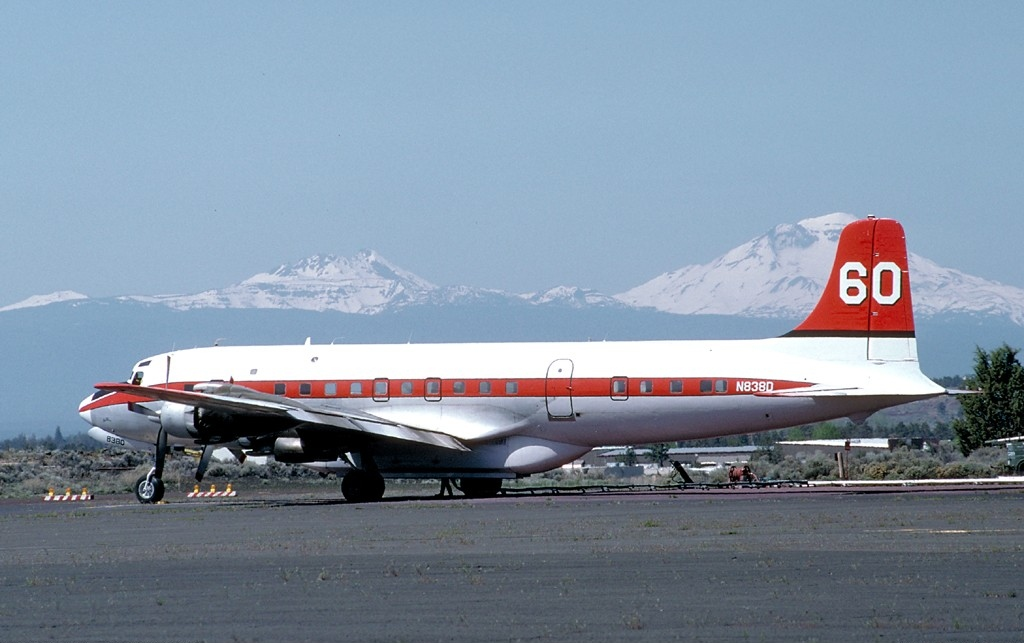
Erickson Aero Tanker DC-7B Tanker 60, N838D, at Redmond, Oregon, in 2001. Its October 2020 retirement flight has been described as likely the final flight of any DC-7 airframe.

After their airline careers, some DC-7s were converted for cargo and aerial firefighting use. The type remained in active aerial firefighting service until October 2020, when Erickson Aero Tanker's DC-7B Tanker 60, N838D, completed its final firefighting season and was retired after its Oregon contract ended. On October 14, 2020, it departed Medford for Madras, Oregon. Propliner Information Exchange described the flight as possibly the final flight of any DC-7, noting that there were no other operating DC-7s and that Erickson's 2021 Oregon contract did not include DC-7 tankers. N838D was the last airworthy aircraft of the DC-7 family and made its retirement flight from Medford to Madras, Oregon, in October 2020.

=== Military operators ===
- Colombia
- France
- Mexico
- Rhodesia Flown by civilian sanctions buster Jack Malloch

=== Production and deliveries ===
A total of 338 DC-7-series aircraft were built, consisting of 105 DC-7s, 112 DC-7Bs and 121 DC-7Cs. American Airlines was the launch customer for the DC-7. The following table lists new-build deliveries by first operator.

First operator	DC-7	DC-7B	DC-7C
Alitalia	—	—	6
American Airlines	34	24	—
Braniff Airways	—	—	7
British Overseas Airways Corporation	—	—	10
Continental Air Lines	—	6	—
Delta Air Lines	10	11	—
Eastern Air Lines	—	50	—
Japan Air Lines	—	—	4
KLM	—	—	15
Mexicana	—	—	3
National Airlines	4	4	—
Northwest Orient Airlines	—	—	14
Panair do Brasil	—	—	4
Panagra	—	6	—
Pan American World Airways	—	7	26
Sabena	—	—	10
Scandinavian Airlines System	—	—	14
South African Airways	—	4	—
Swissair	—	—	5
Transports Aériens Intercontinentaux	—	—	3
United Airlines	57	—	—
Total	105	112	121

For airline-by-airline delivery totals, see List of Douglas DC-7 operators.

== Accidents and incidents ==
The Aviation Safety Network lists 97 DC-7 accidents and incidents between 1955 and 1993, with 728 fatalities in the DC-7 fatality column when only the DC-7 side of split mid-air-collision entries is counted.

June 30, 1956
United Airlines Flight 718, a DC-7, (N6324C) collided over the Grand Canyon with TWA Flight 2, an L-1049 Super Constellation (N6902C), resulting in the deaths of 128 people on both aircraft.

January 31, 1957
A DC-7 (N8210H) still owned by Douglas crashed into a school yard in the Pacoima area of Los Angeles, California, following a midair collision with Northrop F-89J Scorpion 52-1870, resulting in the deaths of the four crewmembers aboard the DC-7, the pilot of the Scorpion jet, and three students on the ground.

March 5, 1957
An American Airlines DC-7B (N316AA) on a flight from Idlewild International Airport (now JFK Airport) in New York City to Dallas Love Field in Dallas, TX suffered failure of the #1 engine. The propeller and nose section detached and struck the fuselage, leading to decompression. The pilot made a successful emergency landing at Memphis; there were no fatalities or injuries. The plane was repaired and returned to service.

June 28, 1957
An Eastern Air Lines DC-7B (N808D) collided with a parked Eastern Air Lines Lockheed L-1049 (N6212C) at Miami International Airport after returning from a training flight. Fuel leaked and both aircraft burned out.

February 1, 1958
Pan Am Flight 70, a DC-7C (N733PA, Clipper Blue Jacket), landed wheels-up at Schiphol Airport as a result of pilot error; all 16 on board survived. The aircraft was repaired and returned to service as a freighter. See also July 26, 1970 below.

March 10, 1958
A DC-7B (N846D) still owned by Douglas crashed at Long Beach, California during a test flight before delivery to Eastern Air Lines.

March 25, 1958
Braniff Flight 971, a DC-7C (N5904), crashed shortly after takeoff from Miami while attempting to return after an engine caught fire. Nine passengers out of 24 people aboard died in the accident.

April 21, 1958
United Airlines Flight 736, a DC-7 (N6328C) en route from Los Angeles to Denver, collided with a Nellis Air Force Base, North American F-100 Super Sabre "F-100F" (two-seater) (56–3755) near Las Vegas. Both aircraft crashed out of control resulting in the deaths of 49 people.

May 18, 1958
A Sabena DC-7C (OO-SFA) crashed near Casablanca–Anfa Airport during the attempted landing. All nine crewmembers and 52 of the 56 passengers died.

September 24, 1959
TAI Flight 307, a DC-7C, crashed at Bordeaux airport with the loss of 54 lives. After takeoff, the aircraft failed to gain altitude and collided with trees 3 km (1.9 mi) from the start of the takeoff.

November 16, 1959
National Airlines Flight 967, a DC-7B on a flight from Tampa, Florida, to New Orleans, crashed into the Gulf of Mexico. All 42 occupants perished. Although sabotage was suspected, no definite cause of the crash was determined due to a lack of evidence. The aircraft was owned by Delta Air Lines.

February 26, 1960
Alitalia Flight 618, a DC-7C (I-DUVO), crashed at Shannon Airport, Ireland, shortly after takeoff following a loss of altitude while making a left turn with 34 fatalities out of 52 passengers and crew. No cause was established for this accident.

June 27, 1960
A Cubana de Aviación DC-7 took off from José Martí International Airport, Cuba, to Idlewild International Airport (now JFK International Airport). Near cruising altitude, engines #3 and #4 failed and caught fire. They safely landed at Key West International Airport with no fatalities.

July 14, 1960
Northwest Orient Airlines Flight 1-11, a DC-7C (N292), ditched off Polillo Island, Philippines due to failure of the number two engine and fire; one person (out of 58 on board) died when the number two propeller separated and penetrated the fuselage.

February 18, 1961
A Pan Am DC-7CF (N745PA) struck a mound of earth short of the runway in Stuttgart while attempting an ILS approach, shearing off the undercarriage and #1 engine. The pilots retained control and were able to climb away, then make a belly landing at Nurnberg airport. The aircraft was written off.

November 1, 1961
A Panair do Brasil DC-7C (PP-PDO) flying from Sal to Recife crashed into a hill about 2.7 km (1.7 mi) short of the runway at Recife. Forty-five passengers and crew out of the 88 persons aboard lost their lives. The accident was attributed to pilot error.

March 4, 1962
Caledonian Airways Flight 153 crashed into a swamp shortly after takeoff from Douala International Airport; all 111 people on board died. It is the worst single-aircraft accident of a DC-7.

October 22, 1962
Northwest Airlines Flight 292, a DC-7C (N285) with 7 crew and 95 passengers, made a successful water landing in Sitka Sound just before 1 p.m. local time after struggling with propeller problems for 45 minutes while operating as a military charter flight between McChord Air Force Base and Elmendorf Air Force Base. The plane stayed afloat for 24 minutes after coming to rest in the water, giving the occupants ample time to evacuate into life rafts with only 6 minor injuries reported. All passengers and crew were quickly rescued by U.S. Coast Guard ships. The cause was an overspeeding propeller when the blower section on engine number two failed.

November 30, 1962
Eastern Air Lines Flight 512, a DC-7B on a flight from Charlotte, North Carolina, to New York-Idlewild, crashed after a missed approach due to fog. This accident, which cost 25 lives (out of 51 on board), was attributed to improper crew procedures.

June 3, 1963
Northwest Airlines Flight 293, a Military Air Transport Service flight from McChord Air Force Base in Washington state to Elmendorf Air Force Base in Alaska crashed into the Pacific Ocean near Annette Island, Alaska, with the loss of all 101 people aboard. Due to the lack of evidence, no cause was established for this accident.

February 8, 1965
Eastern Air Lines Flight 663 crashed a few minutes after takeoff from John F. Kennedy Airport in New York after taking evasive action to avoid a possible collision with another airliner (Pan Am Flight 212, a Boeing 707). All 84 passengers and crew died.

December 7, 1968
A North American Aircraft Trading DC-7C (VR-BCY) crashed during approach to Uli Airstrip following triple engine failure during a relief flight, killing all four crew.

June 5, 1969
A Swedish Red Cross DC-7B (SE-ERP) was shot down by a Nigerian Air Force MiG-17 and crashed at Eket, Nigeria, killing all four crew. The aircraft was operating a supply flight from Fernando Po (now Bioko) to Biafra.

July 26, 1970
An ARCO ferry flight of a DC-7CF (VR-BCT), from Kinshasa suffered an explosive failure of the #3 engine. The pilots succeeded in making a belly landing on 2 engines (engine #4 having been inoperable for the entire flight), however the plane was damaged beyond repair. This aircraft had previously crashed in 1958.

October 2, 1970
A Spantax DC-7C (EC-ATQ) was written off at Barajas Airport.

December 31, 1972
Professional Baseball player Roberto Clemente and 4 others in a chartered DC-7 died when the plane crashed shortly after takeoff from San Juan, Puerto Rico. Only parts of the fuselage and the body of pilot Jerry Hill were recovered. The cause was traced to maintenance and pilot errors.

June 21, 1973
A Skyways International DC-7C (N296) crashed in the Everglades six minutes after takeoff from Miami International Airport, apparently caused by an onboard fire and/or severe turbulence. Three crew members, the sole occupants, died. The aircraft was on lease to Warnaco Incorporated.

March 3, 1974
A Douglas DC-7C/F (EI-AWG) operating an Aer Turas Teo charter flight from Dublin landed at Luton Airport on runway 08 just after midnight but failed to achieve reverse thrust. Normal braking application also was ineffective and the emergency pneumatic brakes were applied. All main wheel tires burst. The aircraft overran the runway and continued over the steep bank at the eastern perimeter finally coming to rest in soft ground 90 metres beyond. The situation had also been made worse by an inadvertent application of forward thrust by the crew in trying to achieve reverse thrust. Three of the six passengers and two of the four crew were injured. The badly damaged aircraft was written off.

October 4, 1976
An Emirates Air Transport DC-7CF (TZ-ARC) struck Mount Kenya due to a premature descent, killing the four crew.

September 12, 1977
A Safe Air Cargo DC-7BF (N6314J) crashed on climbout from Yakutat Airport after an engine lost power and caught fire, killing the four crew. 14 CFR 91 subpart D was revised in the wake of this accident.

September 6, 1978
An Advance Aviation Inc. DC-7CF (N244B) was being used to smuggle marijuana when it crashed near Farmerville, Louisiana due to pilot error, killing one of six on board. Thirty-five bales of marijuana were recovered from the wreckage.

June 22, 1979
A Go Transportation DC-7CF (N357AL) crashed on climbout from Barstow Airport due to overloading and loss of engine power (caused by improper 100 octane fuel), killing one of six crew.

September 14, 1979
A Butler Aircraft Inc. DC-7 (N4SW) transporting company employees to Medford, Oregon, crashed on the crest of Surveyor Mountain near Klamath Falls, Oregon. The crash, which claimed the 12 occupants aboard, was attributed to the crew's decision to undertake a night flight at low altitude.

1980
An Aero Services Corp. DC-7CF (N8219H) was shot down and crashed in Colombia during a smuggling flight.

July 27, 1980
A Lambda Air Cargo DC-7CF (CP-1291) burned out on the ground at Trujillo Airport.

November 28, 1980
A Central Air Service DC-7B (N816D) crashed near Pecos Municipal Airport, Texas, soon after takeoff killing the pilot and co-pilot on board. The plane entered a steep 90° left bank after takeoff, descended fast with the no. 2 prop feathered and crashed in a field.

October 9, 1986
A T&G Aviation DC-7C (N5903) ditched off Dakar due to engine problems, killing three of four crew.

December 8, 1988
A T&G Aviation DC-7CF (N284) was shot down by a SAM-7 missile fired by the Polisario Front and crashed in the Western Sahara, killing the five crew. A second T&G DC-7 (N90984) was also hit, losing an engine, but was able to land safely. Polisario soldiers thought the aircraft were Moroccan C-130s.

October 1, 1992
A TBM Incorporated DC-7B (N848D) crashed near Union Valley Reservoir, California due to pilot error and poor crew resource management, killing both pilots.

== Surviving aircraft ==
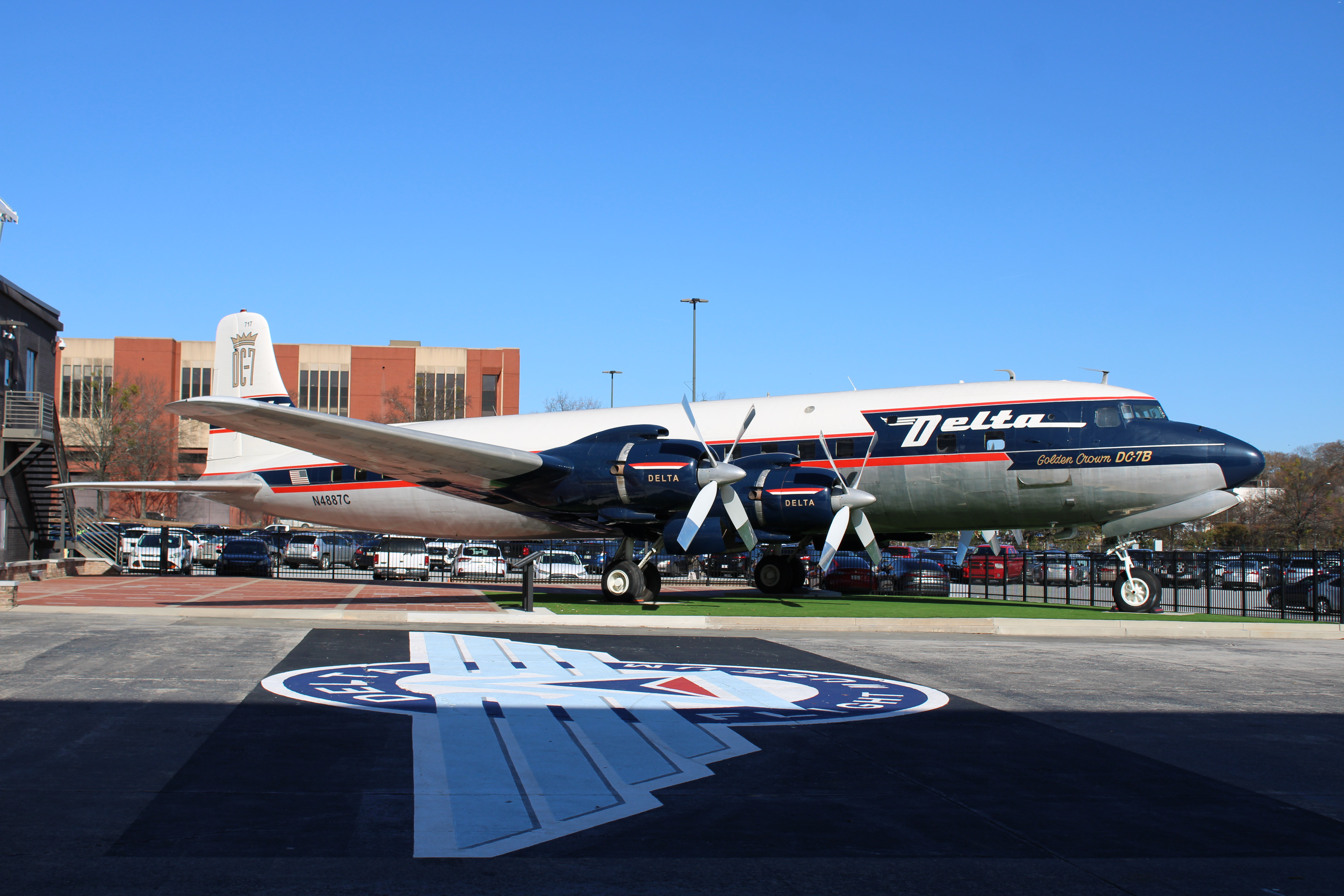
DC-7B at the Delta Flight Museum

=== Spain ===
- c/n 45553 – DC-7C on static display in San Bartolomé de Tirajana, Las Palmas.

=== United States ===
- c/n 44285 "Charlie 21" – DC-7 fuselage used as a kindergarten classroom at Iliff Preschool in Denver, Colorado. Originally delivered to United Airlines as N6321C in 1954, it was moved to the school in 1971.
- c/n 44701 – DC-7B on static display at the Pima Air & Space Museum in Tucson, Arizona.
- c/n 44921 – DC-7BF on static display at Epic Flight Academy in New Smyrna Beach, Florida.
- c/n 45106 – DC-7 forward fuselage on static display at the National Air and Space Museum in Washington, D.C.
- c/n 45145 – DC-7 in storage at Madras Municipal Airport in Madras, Oregon. It was previously used by Erickson Aero Tanker.
- c/n 45345 – DC-7B on static display at the Sullenberger Aviation Museum in Charlotte, North Carolina.
- c/n 45347 – DC-7B in storage at Madras Municipal Airport in Madras, Oregon. It was previously used by Erickson Aero Tanker.
- c/n 45351 – DC-7B on static display at the Delta Flight Museum in Atlanta, Georgia.
- c/n 45486 – DC-7 in storage at Madras Municipal Airport in Madras, Oregon. It was previously used by Erickson Aero Tanker.
- c/n 45549 – DC-7C in storage at Phoenix Goodyear Airport in Litchfield Park, Arizona.

== Specifications (DC-7C) ==
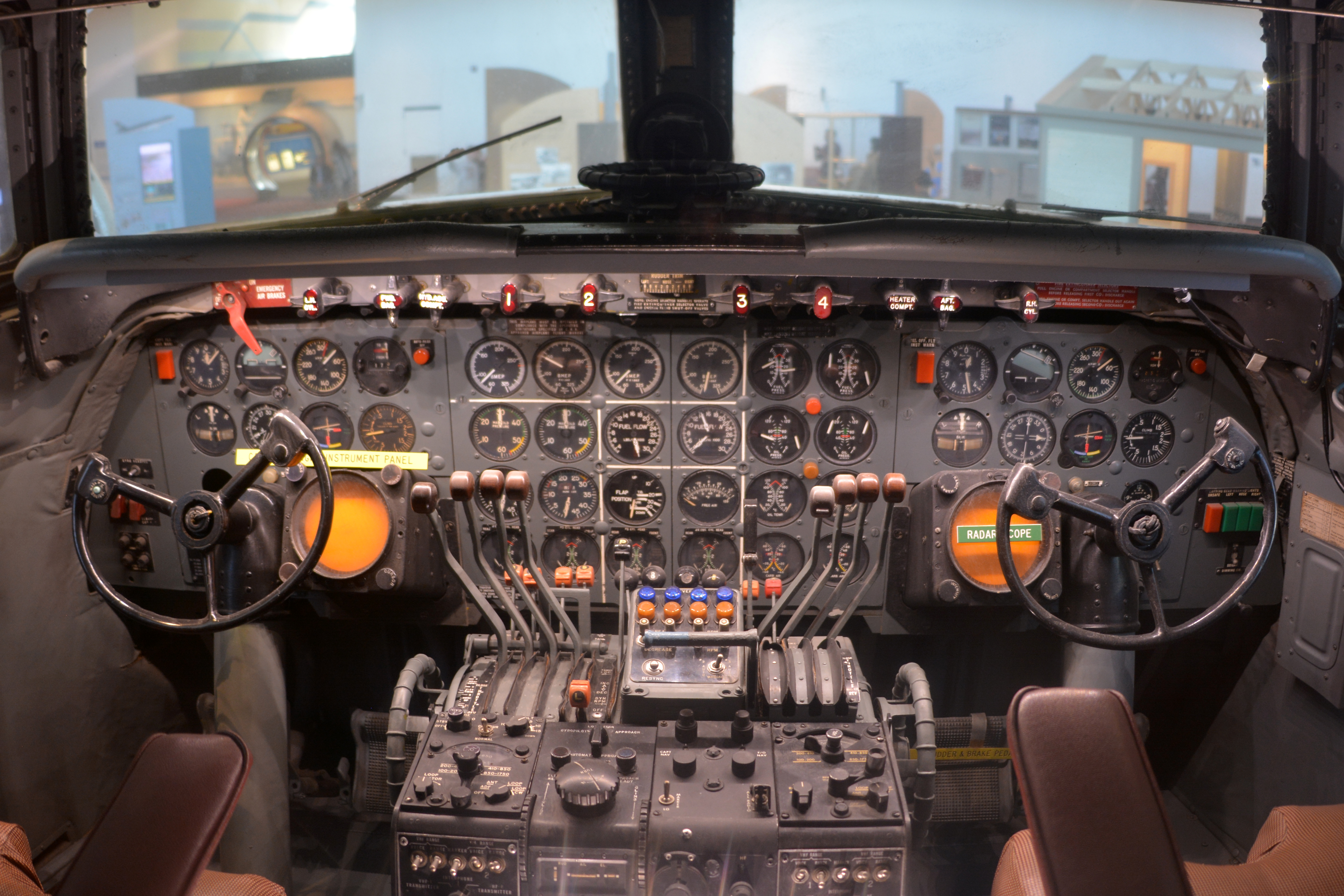
DC-7 Cockpit – From the display at the National Air and Space Museum in Washington, DC

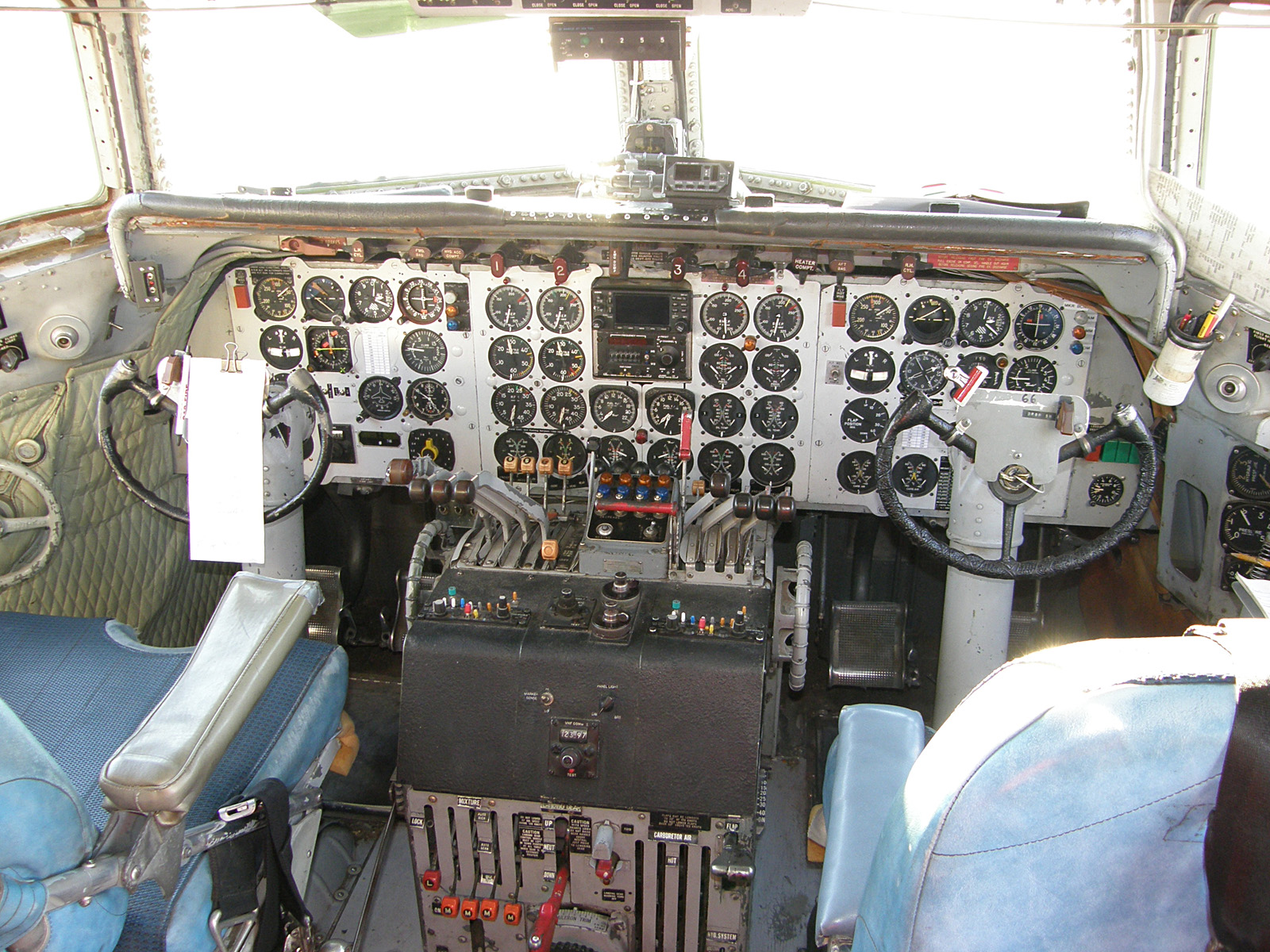
DC-7 cockpit (with updated avionics)

Data from Jane's all the World's Aircraft 1959-60

General characteristics

- Crew: 5 flight crew, 4 flight attendants
- Capacity: up to 105 Passengers + 18,440 lb (8,360 kg) cargo/baggage
- Length: 112 ft 3 in (34.21 m)
- Wingspan: 127 ft 6 in (38.86 m)
- Height: 31 ft 8 in (9.65 m)
- Wing area: 1,637 sq ft (152.1 m^{2})
- Airfoil: root: NACA 23016; tip: NACA 23012
- Empty weight: 72,763 lb (33,005 kg) * Operating weight empty: 78,890 lb (35,780 kg)
- Max takeoff weight: 143,000 lb (64,864 kg) * Maximum landing weight: 109,000 lb (49,000 kg)
- Fuel capacity: 7,824 US gal (6,515 imp gal; 29,620 L) in eight wing tanks; oil capacity 246 US gal (205 imp gal; 930 L)
- Powerplant: 4 × Wright R-3350-988TC18EA1 or R-3350-988TC18EA4 18-cylinder turbo-compound air-cooled radial piston engines, 3,400 hp (2,500 kW) each for take-off at sea level

2,800 hp (2,100 kW) in low blower at sea level
2,850 hp (2,130 kW) in low blower at 4,300 ft (1,300 m)
1,900 hp (1,400 kW) maximum cruise in low blower at 14,800 ft (4,500 m)
1,800 hp (1,300 kW) maximum cruise in high blower at 24,400 ft (7,400 m)

- Propellers: 4-bladed Hamilton-Standard Hydromatic 34E60-345, 14 ft 0 in (4.27 m) diameter constant-speed fully-feathering reversible propellers

Performance

- Maximum speed: 406 mph (653 km/h, 353 kn) rated power in high blower at 22,700 ft (6,900 m)
- Cruise speed: 346 mph (557 km/h, 301 kn) recommended at 21,600 ft (6,600 m) and 110,000 lb (50,000 kg) gross weight
- Stall speed: 97 mph (156 km/h, 84 kn) at landing weight
- Range: 5,635 mi (9,069 km, 4,897 nmi) , max fuel, 15,310 lb (6,940 kg) payload at 274 mph (238 kn; 441 km/h) at 15,000 ft (4,600 m) with no allowances

4,635 mi (7,459 km; 4,028 nmi), max payload with no allowances

- Service ceiling: 21,700 ft (6,600 m) at max gross weight

14,600 ft (4,500 m) on three engines at max gross weight

- Rate of climb: 240 ft/min (1.2 m/s) at 20,000 ft (6,100 m) at max gross weight
- Take-off field length: 6,360 ft (1,940 m) at max gross weight
- Landing run from 50 ft (15 m): 5,100 ft (1,600 m)

== See also ==
- Douglas DC-7B N836D

Related development

- Douglas DC-4
- Douglas DC-6

Aircraft of comparable role, configuration, and era

- Boeing 377 Stratocruiser
- Bristol Britannia
- Lockheed Constellation
- Lockheed L-049 Constellation
- Lockheed L-1049 Super Constellation
- Lockheed L-1649 Starliner

Related lists

- List of civil aircraft
- List of Douglas DC-7 operators
