= Nomads (air travel club) =

US air travel club (1965–2011)

- Boeing Super 27 2010. Nomads painted flags of visited nations next to the aircraft door.
IATA	ICAO	Call sign
—	NMD^{(1)}	NOMAD^{(1)}
- Founded: August 6, 1965, incorporated in Michigan as Nomads Inc.
- Commenced operations: December 30, 1965
- Ceased operations: January 2011
- Operating bases: Detroit Metropolitan Airport
- Fleet size: See Fleet below
- Headquarters: Romulus, Michigan
- Founders: Joseph Benich; Joseph A. Gillis, Jr.

Notes
- (1) In 1970, Nomads got FAA permission to use the "Nomads One" callsign. The FAA shows NMD/NOMAD as valid as of 1975 but not listed by 1980. By 2007, NMD was assigned to a Namibian carrier.

Nomads was a US air travel club that operated from 1965 to 2011. An air travel club was a membership-form of low-cost US air transport that operated its own commercial aircraft. Such clubs were invented in the 1960s in part as a way to sidestep regulation by the Civil Aeronautics Board (CAB), the now defunct federal agency that, at the time, exerted tight economic control over most US commercial air transport. Nomads started operation with a Douglas DC-7; over time it operated a Lockheed L-188 Electra turboprop, a Convair 990 and Boeing 727s. In 1968 the Federal Aviation Administration (FAA) estimated there were 50 active air travel clubs, but by 1990, it was the sole US travel club still operating its own aircraft.

== History ==
=== Context ===
Air travel clubs were non-profit membership organizations that operated their own commercial aircraft, avoiding regulation by the Civil Aeronautics Board (CAB), the now defunct federal agency that, until 1979, provided tight economic regulation of almost all US commercial air transport. While unregulated by the CAB, air travel clubs were regulated for operations/safety by the FAA.

=== Foundation ===
727-30C at Faro, Portugal 1989

727-200 before its 1998 conversion to Super 27. Orlando 1995

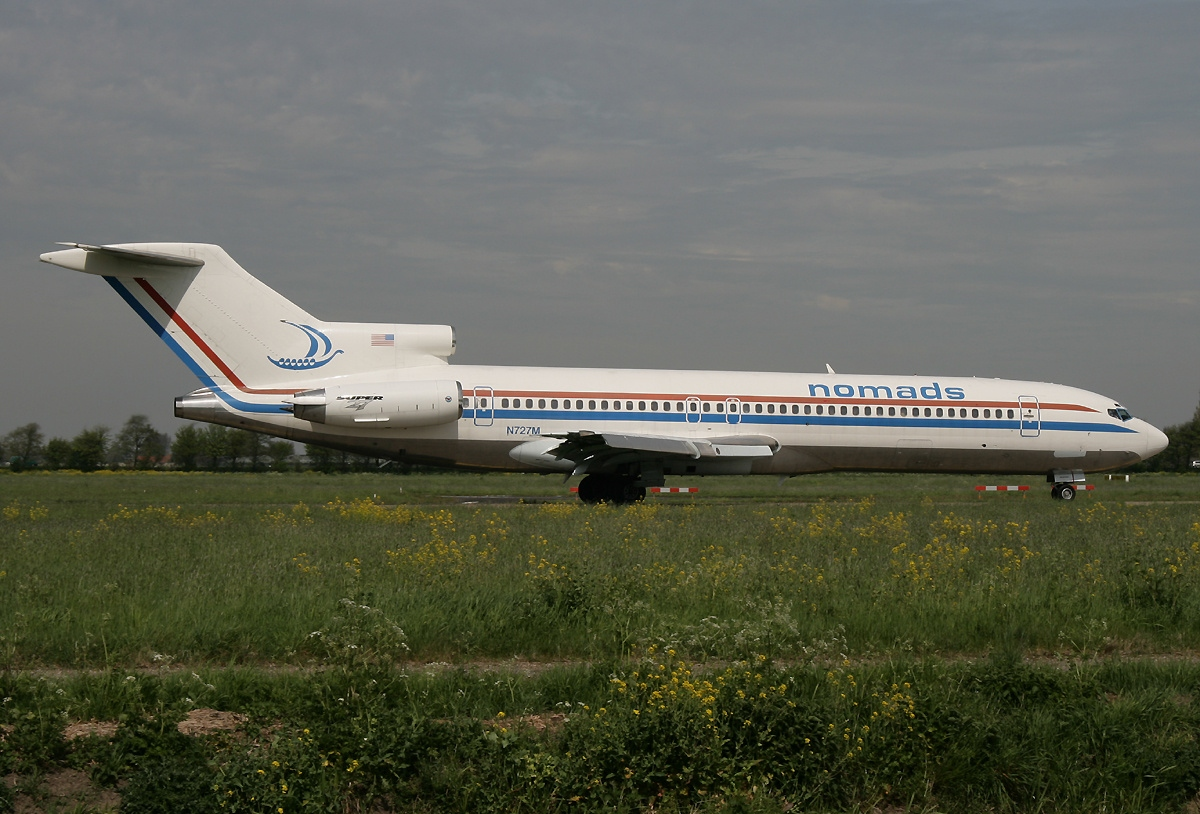
Engine markings confirm this is Super 27 variant of Boeing 727. Rotterdam 2008

Nomads was incorporated in Michigan as a non-profit on August 6, 1965. Its first trip departed 30 December 1965 with a DC-7B. In its first year it flew 30 trips, about half of them long weekends. Nomads was one of two surviving air travel clubs among five that contended in Detroit 1965–1966, the other being Detroit Voyagers. Nomads was based at Detroit Metropolitan Airport, whereas Detroit Voyager stationed its aircraft, also a DC-7, at Willow Run Airport. Detroit Voyagers ceased operating in 1968, leaving Nomads as the sole Detroit-area air travel club.

Initially, Nomads achieved airfare savings of as much as 50% for its members. Part of this was due to the low cost of the aircraft. It bought its DC-7 for $93,000 vs a price when new of around $2.25 million, due to the advent of jets. Nomads was also frugal. Initially, members brought their own food on outbound trips. It served cold box lunches and coffee rather than hot onboard meals and alcohol. It relied on volunteer labor for many functions. For instance, in the early 1970s it had a paid first officer and flight engineer, but the captain was a mainline pilot who volunteered his (pilots at the time were almost exclusively male) time in return for a free trip for him and his wife. Likewise flight attendants worked in exchange for a free trip.

Some competitors contrasted their approach with that of Nomads. Sky Hoppers was an air travel club that entered Detroit in 1969, touting turkey and champagne versus "cold box lunches." Sky Hoppers (one of whom was Nomads co-founder Joseph A. Gillis, Jr.) flew at least two trips with a DC-7C in November and December 1969, but its aircraft was returned in January 1970. In the early 1970s, a Milwaukee club, Air Holiday, entered Michigan, noting its fully professional staff compared to Nomads partial volunteer approach. Air Holiday declared bankruptcy and ceased operating in 1974.

=== Later days ===
The nature of the club changed over time. At its demise, the Wall Street Journal characterized it as "elite" and the club was known for a membership of mainly "affluent retirees." Trips were no longer about saving money, but focused more on providing convenience, with drive-up checkin, free parking at its own terminal (which the club had from 1979), door-to-door baggage service and other amenities. In 2006, the club swapped out 145 coach class seats for 92 business class seats on its aircraft. It also now served meals on all flights longer than two hours.

A member committee decided on future trips, which were publicized to members through the club's own magazine. 1990 membership was 5,700 with thousands more represented through families. The club did not solely rely on its own aircraft. In 1990, 15–20% of trips depended on commercial flights. For example, in 1985 and in 1999, the club flew Concorde to London, filling five flights in 1985 and three flights in 1999. These were the only occasions Concorde flew into Detroit.

The club's last operation was a round-the-world trip in January 2011. Of 4600 members in 2010, only 2500 renewed for 2011, and members rejected a proposal to ask members for a further assessment to shore up finances. Planned trips to Jamaica and India in February were cancelled. Nomads filed for liquidation within Chapter 7 bankruptcy on 1 March, 2011.

== Fleet ==
The DC-7 was retired in June 1971 and Nomads upgraded to a Lockheed L-188 Electra in July. It added a Convair 990 in November 1975 but retired the Convair in October 1979. The Electra was sold in September 1981 and in January 1982 it started flying a Boeing 727-100. The 727-100 was swapped out for a Boeing 727-200 in 1993 and in 1998, the 727-200 was upgraded to a Super 27, with the outboard engines swapped for JT8D-200 series engines. That upgrade allowed the aircraft to fly from Los Angeles to Hawaii.

Year end 1965:

- Douglas DC-7

Year end 1971:

- Lockheed L-188 Electra

Year end 1975:

- Convair 990
- Lockheed L-188 Electra

Year end 1982:

- Boeing 727-100

Year end 1993:

- Boeing 727-200

Year end 1998:

- Super 27

== See also ==
- Air travel club
- List of defunct airlines of the United States
