= Alitalia Flight 618 =

1960 aviation accident

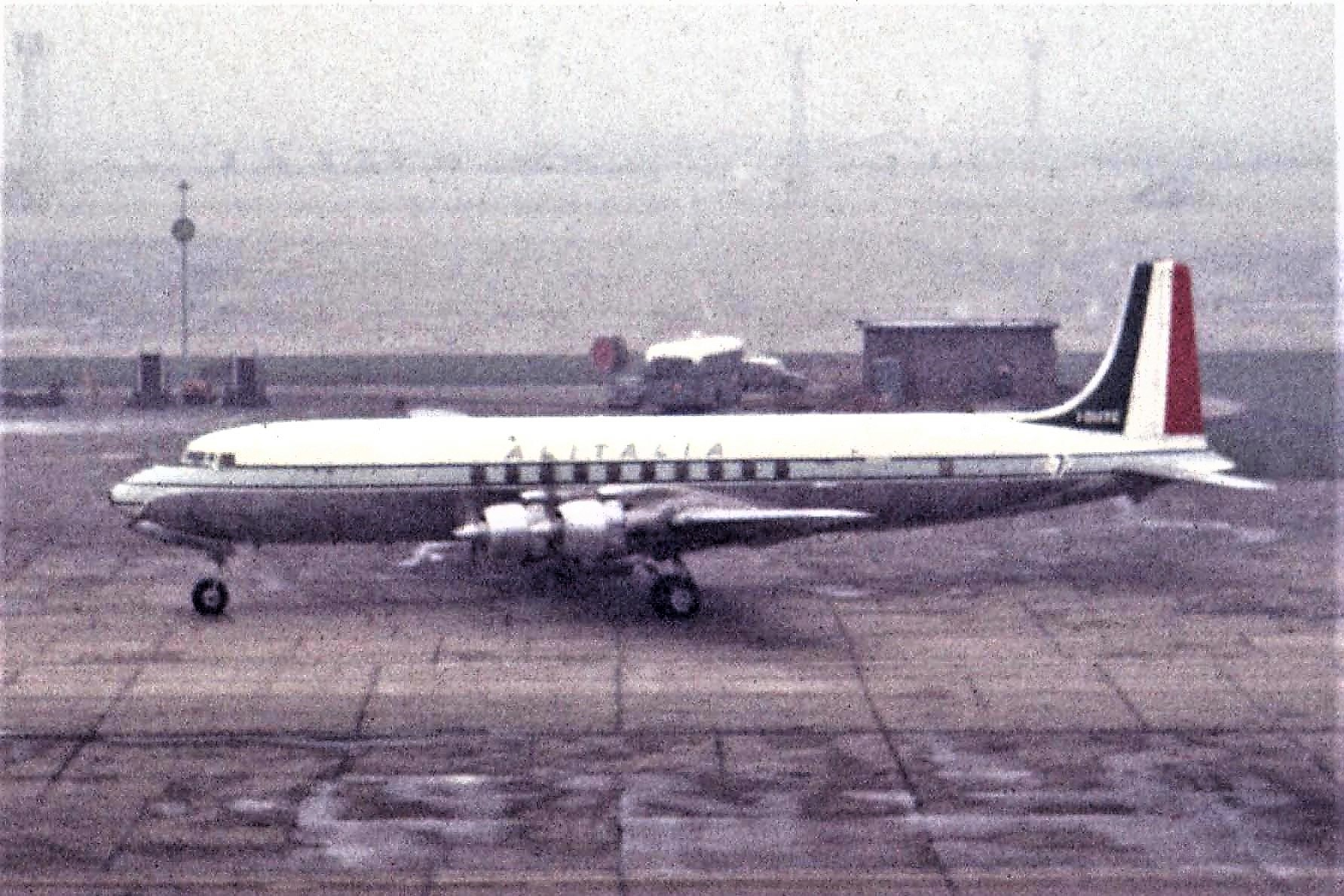
- An Alitalia Douglas DC-7C, similar to the aircraft involved in the accident.

Accident
- Date: 26 February 1960
- Summary: Controlled flight into terrain; cause believed to be pilot error
- Site: Shannon Airport

Aircraft
- Aircraft type: Douglas DC-7C
- Operator: Alitalia
- Registration: I-DUVO
- Flight origin: Roma-Ciampino Airport, Italy
- Stopover: Shannon Airport, Ireland
- 1st stopover: Gander Airport, Newfoundland and Labrador, Canada
- Destination: Idlewild International Airport, New York, United States
- Occupants: 52
- Passengers: 40
- Crew: 12
- Fatalities: 34
- Injuries: 18
- Survivors: 18

Alitalia Flight 618 was an accident involving a Douglas DC-7C of the Italian airline Alitalia in Shannon, Ireland, on 26 February 1960. Of the 52 people on board, only 18 survived with serious injuries.

== Accident ==
On the morning of 26 February 1960, Flight 618 arrived at its first stopover at Shannon Airport for refueling to continue its journey across the Atlantic, while under the supervision of a check pilot. The flight had been permitted to take off from runway 05 with a clear but still dark and partially overcast sky just 45 minutes after its initial arrival. Takeoff proceeded without issue and the crew retracted the gear before making a left turn when the aircraft had climbed to a height of 165 ft (50 m) with the landing lights still on. While turning, the aircraft's power was reduced slightly but the flaps were never fully retracted. Instead of climbing, the airliner only accelerated and lost altitude very quickly. The pilots were unable to prevent the left wing tip from striking a stone wall near the Clonloghan church followed by the left engines and the rest of the wing which also struck several gravestones of the surrounding cemetery. At this point, the aircraft's fate was sealed and after the propellers of the right engine also scraped past the wall, the out-of-control aircraft slammed into the ground in an open field beyond the cemetery and burst into flames.

The post-crash fire quickly engulfed the aircraft and badly burned most of the survivors, as locals and rescue workers arrived at the scene. The fire gutted the wreckage, leaving the tail section as the only recognizable part left of the aircraft. The crash also took its toll on the passengers and crew on board, with only a single crew member surviving the crash alongside 17 passengers, who were all seriously injured.

== Aircraft ==
The Douglas DC-7C involved, I-DUVO (msn 45231) was built in 1958 and was used by Alitalia from 1958 until its destruction in 1960.

== Aftermath ==
The aircraft was destroyed by the impact and post-crash fire with the wreckage being documented on film and by photography. An investigation of the accident revealed the aircraft's speed at impact as between 170 and 180 knots (310 and 330 km/h). Investigators failed to find any evidence pointing to the cause of the crash.

== Notes ==
Another incident on the same flight Alitalia 618 Rome to New York happened in 1970 without fatalities. The pilots lost control and crashed landing during the approach phase at New York-John F. Kennedy International Airport, due to the activation of reverse thrust mid-air. The aircraft, a DC-8 registered I-DIWZ, was written off.
