= 1973 in aviation =

This is a list of aviation-related events from 1973.

== Events ==
- Don Taylor attempts round-the-world trip in his homebuilt Thorp T-18, ended by a spate of really bad weather between northern Japan and the Aleutian Islands. His next attempt in the summer of 1976 is successful.

=== January ===
- January 2
  - Attempting to land at Edmonton International Airport in Canada in blowing snow, Pacific Western Airlines Flight 3801, a Boeing 707-321C freighter carrying 86 head of cattle and a crew of five, strikes trees and power lines and then breaks apart as it crashes into a ridge. The cattle are thrown through an opening in the front of the fuselage, landing up to 100 meters (330 feet) away. The entire crew dies in the crash and ensuing fire.
  - Released from a psychiatric hospital days earlier, Charles Wenige hides in a lavatory aboard Piedmont Airlines Flight 928, a NAMC YS-11, on arrival at Baltimore-Washington International Airport after a flight from Atlanta, Georgia, and Washington, D.C. After the other passengers disembark, he emerges and points a stolen pistol at a crew member and demands to be flown to Toronto, Ontario, Canada. After two hours of negotiations, he agrees to release the flight attendants in exchange for a meeting with Cardinal Lawrence Shehan and a psychiatrist. As U.S. Federal Bureau of Investigation agent Thomas Farrow escorts Wenige onto the airport apron for the meeting, he advises Wenige to tuck the pistol away in the cardinal's presence, and after Wenige does so, Farrow overpowers and arrests him. This was the last U.S. hijacking before mandatory security screening of airline passengers began.
- January 4 – As a Pacific Western Airlines Convair turboprop airliner prepares to take off from Vancouver, British Columbia, Canada, with 18 people on board, passenger Christopher Kenneth Nielson draws a gun and demands $2 million in cash and to be flown to North Vietnam, threatening to blow up the airliner if his demands are not met. During negotiations, he releases everyone on board the aircraft except three crew members. Police then storm the aircraft and arrest him, finding that he is armed only with two toy guns.
- January 5 – The mandatory security screening of all airline passengers begins at all airports in the United States.
- January 7
  - In the United Kingdom, Cameron Balloons flies the world's first airship lifted by hot air.
  - Police in a borrowed United States Marine Corps CH-46 Sea Knight helicopter exchange fire for several hours with spree killer Mark Essex, who is on the roof of a Howard Johnson's motel in downtown New Orleans. Essex eventually is killed by automatic weapons fire from the helicopter and police sniper fire from nearby rooftops.
- January 9 – In the Vietnam War, President Richard Nixon's administration permits American fighter aircraft to pursue North Vietnamese aircraft north of the 20th Parallel.
- January 12 – Flying a United States Navy F-4 Phantom II fighter of Fighter Squadron 161 (VF-161) off USS Midway, Lieutenants V. T. Kovaleski (pilot) and J. A. Wise (radar intercept officer) score the 197th and final American air-to-air victory of the Vietnam War. It is the 61st kill of the war for American carrier-based aircraft.
- January 14
  - A U.S. Navy F-4B Phantom II of Fighter Squadron 161 (VF-161) off USS Midway flown by Lieutenant V. T. Kovaleski (pilot) and Ensign D. H. Plautz (radar intercept officer) becomes the last American aircraft lost over North Vietnam when it is shot down by antiaircraft artillery near Thanh Hoa while escorting an Operation Blue Tree reconnaissance mission.
  - A CAAC Airlines Ilyushin Il-14 crashes into a mountain near Guiyang in the People's Republic of China, killing all 29 people on board.
- January 15 – President Richard Nixon's administration orders a halt to all bombing and shelling of North Vietnam and all mining of North Vietnamese harbors.
- January 17 – The Government of Togo establishes the Direction de l’Aviation Civile ("Directorate of Civil Aviation") as Togo′s national civil aviation authority. It is the predecessor of the Agence Nationale de l'Aviation Civile du Togo ("National Agency of Civil Aviation of Togo").
- January 18 – Results of the U.S. Air Force A-X fly-off are announced, with the Fairchild YA-10 selected over the Northrop YA-9.
- January 21 – Aeroflot Flight 6263, an Antonov An-24B (registration CCCP-46276) on a domestic flight in the Soviet Union from Kazan to Perm, suddenly banks heavily right and then left at an altitude of 5,400 meters (17,700 feet), then spirals downward, reaching a speed of 1,000 km/h (620 mph). At an altitude of 2,700 meters (8,900 feet) it begins an upward loop, breaks up, and falls to earth near Petukhovo in the Russian Soviet Federated Socialist Republic's Bolshesosnovsky District. The crash kills 35 of the 39 people on board; the other four freeze to death in the −41 °C (−42 °F) temperature at the crash site before rescuers can arrive.
- January 22
  - An Alia Boeing 707-3D3C chartered by Nigeria Airways to fly Muslim pilgrims home to Nigeria from Saudi Arabia crashes after the right main landing gear leg collapses while the plane is attempting to land in high winds at Kano International Airport in Kano, Nigeria. The plane skids off the runway and catches fire, killing 176 of the 202 people on board and injuring all 26 survivors. It is the deadliest aviation accident in history at the time and will be the deadliest of 1973.
  - American businessman Alexander Onassis, the son of Aristotle Onassis and Athina Livanos and brother of Christina Onassis, and the other two men on board suffer serious injuries when his personal Piaggio P.136L-2 amphibian crashes immediately after takeoff from Ellinikon International Airport in Athens, Greece. Onassis dies the following day; the other two men survive.
- January 27
  - A U.S. Navy F-4 Phantom II from USS Enterprise piloted by Lieutenant Commander Harley Hall is shot down over South Vietnam near the Demilitarized Zone. It is the last American fixed-wing aircraft lost in the Vietnam War.
  - The United States, North Vietnam, and South Vietnam agree in Paris to a ceasefire in the Vietnam War, scheduling it to take effect on January 29.
- January 28 – A United States Air Force B-52 Stratofortress conducts the last Operation Arc Light strike of the Vietnam War. Arc Light had begun in 1965.
- January 29
  - A ceasefire agreement between the United States, North Vietnam, and South Vietnam takes effect, ending U.S. participation in the Vietnam War. Since January 1962, the United States Armed Forces have lost 3,339 fixed-wing aircraft in Southeast Asia, 2,430 of them in combat. American aircraft have shot down 200 enemy aircraft in exchange for 76 of their own lost in air-to-air combat. The United States has also lost 4,870 helicopters in Southeast Asia, 2,588 of them in combat.
  - An EgyptAir Ilyushin Il-18 crashes in the Kyrenia Mountains in Cyprus while on descent to land at Nicosia International Airport in Nicosia, Cyprus, killing all 37 people on board.
  - Frontier Airlines hires the first female pilot for any modern-day U.S. airline, Emily Howell Warner. On the same day, the airline also hires its first African-American pilot, Bob Ashby; Ashby is the only Tuskegee Airman to become a commercial airline pilot.
- January 31 – U.S. Air Force and Royal Lao Air Force aircraft have flown a combined 8,000 sorties against Pathet Lao and North Vietnamese forces in Laos since January 1.

=== February ===
- Belgian International Air Services (BIAS) ends long-haul passenger service as its majority stakeholder, Compagnie Maritime Belge, decides to integrate BIAS's fleet of Douglas DC-8 airliners into the fleet of Delta Air Transport. BIAS becomes a commuter airline.
- February 15 – Cuba and the United States sign the "Memorandum of Understanding on Hijacking of Aircraft and Vessels and Other Offenses," which goes into force immediately. Under the agreement, both countries agree to either prosecute or extradite any person who seizes or otherwise takes possession of an aircraft or oceangoing vessel and brings it illegally into the other country's territory, to treat airline hijacking as a crime, and to return any money taken illegally to its original owner. They also agree that a hijacker may be granted political asylum if the hijacker has no other means of escape and commits no other serious crime during the commission of the hijacking. Cuba and Canada sign a similar agreement the same day.
- February 19 – Making an instrument approach to Prague Ruzyně International Airport in Prague, Czechoslovakia, Aeroflot Flight 141, a Tupolev Tu-154 (registration CCCP-85023), crashes northeast of the airport 467 meters (1,532 feet) from the runway, killing 66 of the 100 people on board. At the time, it is both the deadliest accident involving a Tu-154 and the deadliest aviation accident in what would later become the Czech Republic.
- February 21
  - Two Israeli Air Force F-4 Phantom II fighters shoot down Libyan Arab Airlines Flight 114, a Boeing 727-224, after it strays off course over the Israeli-occupied Sinai Peninsula, killing 108 of the 113 people on board and injuring all five survivors.
  - On approach to Changuinola "Capitán Manuel Niño" International Airport in Changuinola, Panama, an Aerovias Urraca Douglas C-47A-70-DL Skytrain (registration HP-560) crashes into Cerro Horqueta mountain, killing 22 of the 28 people on board.
- February 22 – A ceasefire in Laos immediately ends all U.S. Air Force strikes there by tactical aircraft. B-52 Stratofortress strikes will end two months later.
- February 24
  - United States Marine Corps helicopters begin Operation End Sweep to clear naval mines from North Vietnamese harbors.
  - An Aeroflot Ilyushin Il-18V on a domestic flight in the Soviet Union from Dushanbe to Leninabad makes a 60-degree right turn, then banks sharply left. When the bank to the left reaches 90 degrees, the airliner goes into a spin and falls toward the earth, reaching a speed of 840 km/h (520 mph) before breaking up at an altitude of 2,200 meters (7,200 feet) and crashing 40 kilometers (25 miles) from Ura-Tube in the Tajik Soviet Socialist Republic. All 79 people on board die in what at the time is the deadliest aviation accident in the history of Tajikistan.
- February 26 – A corporate Learjet 24 strikes a flock of cowbirds shortly after lifting off from a runway at DeKalb-Peachtree Airport in Chamblee, Georgia, in the United States and strikes the roof of an apartment building before crashing in a ravine. All seven people on board die, and one person in the apartment building suffers severe burns. The birds had been attracted to a landfill near the runway.
- February 27 – A U.S. Navy helicopter of Helicopter Mine Countermeasures Squadron (HM-12) flies the first air mine countermeasures mission in the main shipping channel at Haiphong, North Vietnam.
- February 28
  - President Richard Nixon halts American minesweeping of North Vietnamese harbors because of North Vietnamese delays in releasing American prisoners-of-war.
  - A Merpati Nusantara Airlines de Havilland Canada DHC-6 Twin Otter 100 (registration PK-NUC) crashes near Nabire Airport in Indonesia, killing all 13 people on board.
  - An Aeroflot Yakovlev Yak-40 (registration CCCP-87602) crashes on takeoff from Semipalatinsk Airport in Semey in the Soviet Union's Kazakh Soviet Socialist Republic, killing all 32 people on board.
  - A Polish Air Force Antonov An-24B (NATO reporting name ""Coke") encounters violent turbulence on approach to Szczecin–Goleniów Airport in Szczecin, Poland, and crashes, killing all 18 people on board. Polish Minister of the Interior Wiesław Ociepka and Czechoslovak Minister of the Interior Radko Kaska are among the dead.
  - A Peruvian Air Force de Havilland Canada DHC-5D Buffalo crashes into a mountainside 16 kilometers (9.9 miles) from San Ramón, Peru, killing all 11 people on board. Its wreckage is not found until March 10.

=== March ===
- March 3 – Balkan Bulgarian Airlines Flight 307, an Ilyushin Il-18, crashes in the Soviet Union at Skhodnya while on final approach to Moscow's Sheremetyevo Airport due to significant icing on its tailplane. All 25 people on board die.
- March 5 – Iberia Flight 504, a McDonnell Douglas DC-9-32 (registration EC-BII) with 68 people on board, collides with Spantax Flight 400, a Convair CV-990-30A-5 Coronado (registration EC-BJC) carrying 107 people, over Nantes, France. The Spantax airliner makes an emergency landing at Cognac-Châteaubernard Air Base without any fatalities among its passengers and crew, but the Iberia plane crashes, killing everyone on board.
- March 6 – American minesweeping of North Vietnamese harbors resumes, primarily employing helicopters.
- March 8 – An overloaded United States Army Douglas C-47J Skytrain crashes in a corn field near Silk Hope, North Carolina, killing all 14 people on board. Eleven members of the United States Army Parachute Team, the "Golden Knights," are among the dead.
- March 17 – American air mine countermeasures helicopters sweep the harbors of Hon Gai and Cam Pha, North Vietnam.
- March 19 – An Air Vietnam Douglas C-54D-15-DC Skymaster crashes in South Vietnam 6.5 kilometers (4.0 miles) south of Buon Ma Thuot Airport after an explosion in its baggage compartment near the wing root. All 58 people on board die.
- March 28 – The last U.S. Air Force aircraft withdraws from South Vietnam.

=== April ===
- April 6 – The last "Freedom Flight" arrives in the United States from Cuba. Operating twice daily five days a week since they began in December 1965 – except for a period from May 1972 to December 1972, when President of Cuba Fidel Castro temporarily suspended the program – the "Freedom Flights" have transported an estimated 300,000 Cubans from Cuba to the United States in the "largest airborne refugee operation in American history."
- April 10 – Invicta International Airlines Flight 435, a chartered Vickers Vanguard 952 carrying mostly women who are members of the Axbridge Ladies Guild of Somerset, England, crashes into a snowy, forested hillside near Hochwald, Switzerland, and somersaults, killing 108 of the 145 people on board and injuring all but one of the 37 survivors. The crash leaves 55 children motherless.
- April 12 – Due to confusion about runway assignments, a National Aeronautics and Space Administration Convair CV-990-30A-5 Coronado and a United States Navy Lockheed P-3C-125-LO Orion approach Naval Air Station Moffett Field, California, intending to land on the same runway. They collide over Sunnyvale, California, 1 kilometer (0.62 miles) south of the airfield and crash on Sunnyvale Municipal Golf Course, killing all 11 people on the CV-990 and five of the six on the P-3C.
- April 24
  - In the Soviet Union, Leningrad's Shosseynaya Airport is renamed Pulkovo Airport.
  - A passenger hijacks an Aeroflot Tupolev Tu-104B (NATO reporting name "Camel", registration CCCP-42505) with 57 people on board during a domestic flight in the Soviet Union from Leningrad to Moscow, demanding to be flown to Stockholm, Sweden. The flight crew decides to return to Leningrad instead. When they lower the landing gear on approach to Leningrad, the hijacker sets off a bomb, killing himself and the flight engineer and blowing a hole in the right side of the airliner's fuselage, but the plane lands safely at Leningrad.
- April 30 – A South Yemen Air Force transport aircraft carrying diplomats on a tour of South Yemen crashes, killing all 25 people on board. South Yemeni Foreign Minister Saleh Al-Aulaqi, writer Mohammad Abdul-Wali, and several ambassadors are among the dead. It was likely a Douglas DC-3.

=== May ===
- May 2 – A Portuguese Air Force Nord 2052 Noratlas crashes just short of the runway on approach to Mueda Airport in Mueda, Portuguese East Africa, killing all 11 people on board.
- May 11 – Aeroflot Flight 6551, an Ilyushin Il-18B (registration CCCP-75687) disintegrates in mid-air over the Soviet Union's Kazakh Soviet Socialist Republic, possibly during an emergency descent, and crashes 84 kilometers (52 miles) south of Semipalatinsk, killing all 63 people on board.
- May 18
  - A passenger with an explosive device hijacks an Aeroflot Tupolev Tu-104B (registration CCCP-75687) over the Soviet Union, demanding to be flown to the People's Republic of China. His explosive device detonates while the airliner is at an altitude of 30,000 feet (9,100 meters), and it crashes in southern Siberia east of Lake Baikal about 97 kilometers (60 miles) west of Chita, killing all 82 people on board.
  - Four hijackers commandeer an Avensa Convair CV-580 with 42 people on board during a domestic flight in Venezuela from Valera to Barquisimeto, demanding the release of prisoners and to be flown to Cuba. The airliner makes refueling stops at Willemstad on Curaçao, Panama City in Panama, and Mérida in Mexico before arriving in Cuba.
- May 19 – A Cambodia Air Commercial Douglas C-47A-50-DL Skytrain crashes in Cambodia just after takeoff from Svay Rieng Airport in Svay Rieng, killing all 11 people on board. Authorities report finding bullet holes in the wreckage, indicating that the plane was shot down.
- May 22 – Aeroperú is formed as the flag carrier of Peru. It will begin flight operations in October with a fleet of three Fokker F28 Fellowships.
- May 25 – Over southern Siberia, a hijacker commandeers an Aeroflot Tupolev Tu-104 during a flight in the Soviet Union from Moscow to Chita.
- May 30 – Two men hijack a SAM Colombia Lockheed L-188 Electra with 93 people on board about 20 minutes after takeoff from Pereira, Colombia, for a domestic flight to Bogotá, demanding ransom money and the release of 140 leftist prisoners in Colombia. After the airliner refuels at Medellín, Colombia, they force it to fly to Aruba. During negotiations there, they release 31 passengers, after which they order the plane to take off again early on May 31 and fly to Lima, Peru. Technical problems force it to return to Aruba, but after repairs it takes off again on the afternoon of May 31 bound for San Salvador, El Salvador. Along the way, the hijackers change their mind and order the plane to reverse course and fly back to Aruba, where it arrives at late on May 31. After the hijackers receive US$50,000 from SAM Colombia, the Electra takes off again, refuels at Guayaquil, Ecuador, and proceeds to Lima, where the hijackers release another 14 passengers. It then flies to Mendoza, Argentina, arriving there early on the afternoon of June 1. After releasing the rest of the passengers, the hijackers order the plane into the air again. It stops at Resistencia, Argentina, and Asunción, Paraguay, before landing finally at Buenos Aires, Argentina, on June 2 without the hijackers aboard; they had escaped, apparently at either Resistencia or Asunción.
- May 31 – Indian Airlines Flight 440, the Boeing 737-2A8 Saranga (registration VT-EAM), strikes high-tension lines on approach to Indira Gandhi International Airport in Delhi, India, and crashes 6 kilometers (3.7 miles) from the airport, killing 48 of the 65 people on board. The Indian Minister of Iron and Steel Mines, Mohan Kumaramangalam, is among the dead, while Indian Member of Parliament Bhan Singh Bhaura is among the survivors.

=== June ===
- June 1
  - Jeanne M. Holm is promoted to major general in the U.S. Air Force, the first woman in the United States Armed Forces to achieve the rank. Her date of rank is set retroactively at July 1, 1970.
  - After initiating a go-around at an altitude of 90 meters (300 feet) while on final approach to Tirirical Airport in São Luís, Brazil, Cruzeiro do Sul Flight 109, a Sud Aviation SE-210 Caravelle VIN (registration PP-PDX), stalls and crashes, killing all 23 people on board.
- June 3 – The first production Tupolev Tu-144 supersonic airliner breaks up during a demonstration flight at the Paris Air Show and crashes at Goussainville, Val-d'Oise, France, striking 15 houses. The crash kills its entire crew of six, and also kills eight people – three of them children – and severely injures 60 on the ground.
- June 4
  - Flying a MiG Ye-155, Soviet pilot Boris A. Orlov sets a world time-to-height record, climbing to 20,000 meters (66,000 feet) in 2 minutes 49.8 seconds. On the same day, another Soviet pilot, Pyotr M. Ostapenko, sets two time-to-height world records in a Ye-155, reaching 25,000 meters (82,000 feet) in 3 minutes 12.6 seconds and 30,000 meters (98,000 feet) in 4 minutes 3.86 seconds.
  - Bonnie Linda Tiburzi (age 24) becomes the first woman pilot to earn her wings with a national American airline, American Airlines.
- June 7 – Bahamasair commences operations.
- June 9 – Due to an improper configuration of spoilers, a Varig Boeing 707-327C freighter on approach to Rio de Janeiro–Galeão International Airport in Rio de Janeiro, Brazil, pitches downward from at altitude of 70 meters (230 feet), strikes approach lights, and ditches in Guanabara Bay, killing two members of its four-person crew.
- June 10 – Three hijackers demand ransom money aboard a Royal Nepal Airlines de Havilland Canada DHC-6 Twin Otter with 21 people on board during a domestic flight in Nepal from Biratnagar to Kathmandu. They force the airliner to fly to Bihar, India, where they escape.
- June 20 – Aeroméxico Flight 229, a McDonnell Douglas DC-9-15, crashes into a mountain while on approach to Licenciado Gustavo Díaz Ordaz International Airport in Puerto Vallarta, Mexico, killing all 27 people on board.
- June 21 – Air Canada Flight 890, a Douglas DC-8-53 (registration CF-TIJ) catches fire while refueling at Toronto International Airport in Toronto, Ontario, Canada. The fire destroys the airliner, but no one is on board at the time and there are no fatalities.
- June 30 – Aeroflot Flight 512, a Tupolev Tu-134A (registration CCCP-65668) aborts its takeoff from Amman Civil Airport in Amman, Jordan, and runs off the end of the runway. It travels 290 meters (950 feet) beyond the runway, sliding down the slope of a ravine, colliding with trees, striking a one-storey concrete building, and breaking into three pieces. The crash kills two of the airliner's seven crew members and seven people in the building, but the other five crew members and all 78 passengers survive.

=== July ===
- July 2 – As a cost-cutting measure, the United States Air Force inactivates the Nineteenth Air Force. It will remain inactive until July 1993.
- July 4
  - An Aeroflot Ilyushin Il-14 (registration CCCP-91534) begins its descent to Shakhtyorsk on Sakhalin island prematurely. Entering clouds, it crashes into 1,093-meter (3,586-foot) Mount Krasnov at an altitude of 950 meters (3,120 feet), killing all 18 people on board.
  - A lone hijacker commandeers an Aerolineas Argentinas Boeing 737-287 (registration LV-JTO) during a domestic flight in Argentina from Buenos Aires to San Miguel de Tucumán and demands $200,000 in government grants to medical agencies. The plane lands in Mendoza, Argentina; Santiago, Chile; Lima, Peru; and Panama City, Panama, before arriving in Havana, Cuba, where the hijacker disembarks. There are no fatalities.
- July 11 – A fire breaks out in a lavatory aboard Varig Flight 820, a Boeing 707-345C. Smoke fills the cabin, and many passengers already have died of smoke inhalation by the time the plane crashes in an attempt to make an emergency landing in a field in Orly commune in France. The fire, smoke, and crash kill 123 of the 135 people on board; among the dead are the president of the Senate of Brazil, Filinto Müller, and the Olympic sailor Jörg Bruder. The 12 survivors include 11 crew members, among them the captain; he will die in the disappearance of a Varig cargo plane in 1979.
- July 15 – A Thailand-based A-7D Corsair II of the 354th Tactical Fighter Wing flies the last U.S. Air Force combat sortie of the war in Southeast Asia over Cambodia. Since February 2, 1962, the U.S. Air Force has flown 5.25 million sorties over Cambodia, Laos, North Vietnam, and South Vietnam, losing 2,251 aircraft – 1,737 to enemy action and 514 to other causes.
- July 20
  - A member of the Japanese Red Army and four members of the Popular Front for the Liberation of Palestine hijack Japan Air Lines Flight 404, a Boeing 747-246B with 140 other people on board, shortly after it takes off from Amsterdam Airport Schiphol in the Netherlands for a flight to Anchorage, Alaska, en route a final destination of Tokyo International Airport, Tokyo, Japan. One of the PFLP members is killed when her hand grenade explodes during the hijacking, also injuring the airliner's chief purser. The surviving hijackers force the plane to fly to Dubai in the United Arab Emirates; after a long stay there, they force it to fly to Damascus, Syria, and Benghazi, Libya, where they release the passengers and crew 89 hours after the hijacking began and blow up the airliner.
  - American artist Robert Smithson is among three people killed when the Beechcraft Baron E55 he is using to photograph sites for his work Amarillo Ramp stalls and crashes near Amarillo, Texas.
- July 22 – The Pan American World Airways Boeing 707-321B Clipper Winged Racer, operating as Flight 816, crashes into the Pacific Ocean 30 seconds after takeoff from Faa'a International Airport in Papeete, Tahiti, French Polynesia, killing 78 of the 79 people on board.
- July 23 – Ozark Air Lines Flight 809, a Fairchild Hiller FH-227, encounters windshear in a thunderstorm and crashes at Normandy, Missouri, while on approach to land at St. Louis International Airport in St. Louis, Missouri, killing 38 of the 44 people on board.
- July 25 – Flying a MiG Ye-155, Soviet pilot Alexander V. Fedotov sets a world altitude record with a 1,000 kg (2,205 lb) payload, reaching 35,230 meters (115,584 feet). On the same day, with no payload, he also sets an absolute world altitude record for a jet-powered aircraft, reaching 36,240 meters (118,898 feet). During the latter flight, the engines flame out in the thin air at high altitude, and the aircraft reaches the apex of its climb following a ballistic trajectory, with its speed dropping to 75 km/h (47 mph) before it begins to fall back to earth.
- July 31 – Delta Air Lines Flight 723, a McDonnell Douglas DC-9-31, strikes a seawall with its landing gear and crashes while landing in fog and low clouds at Logan International Airport in Boston. The crash kills 87 of the 89 people on board immediately; the two survivors later die of their injuries.

=== August ===
- During the month, Syrian surface-to-air missile forces reorganize and redeploy to areas south of Damascus.
- August 13 – Aviaco Flight 118, a Sud Aviation SE 210 Caravelle, crashes into an abandoned farmhouse in Montrove, Spain, while attempting to land at Alvedro Airport, now A Coruña Airport, in A Coruña, Spain, killing all 85 people on board and one person on the ground.
- August 15
  - The U.S. Air Force flies its final mission over Cambodia.
  - In the Gulf of Tonkin off North Vietnam, the U.S. Navy aircraft carrier USS Constellation (CVA-64) departs Yankee Station for the last time. She is the last aircraft carrier to operate at the station, where American aircraft carriers had deployed since 1964.
  - A Turks and Caicos Airways Britten-Norman BN-2A-6 Islander (registration N38JA) suffers an airframe failure over Dondon during a flight in Haiti from Port-au-Prince to Cap-Haïtien and crashes, killing all 10 people on board.
- August 16 – Armed with two guns, an intoxicated Libyan citizen, 37-year-old Mahmoud Toumi, enters the cockpit of a Middle East Airlines Boeing 720-023B (registration OD-AFR) flying from Benghazi, Libya, to Beirut, Lebanon, with 119 people aboard while it is flying over Cyprus and demands that it fly to Lod International Airport in Tel Aviv, Israel. Escorted by Israeli Air Force fighter aircraft, the airliner lands at Lod, where Toumi holds a press conference in which he states that he had hijacked the plane "to show that not all Arabs want to throw Jews into the ocean" and surrenders peacefully. He later is placed in an Israeli psychiatric hospital.
- August 18 – An Aeroflot Antonov An-24B (registration CCCP-46435) suffers an uncontained engine failure on takeoff from Bina International Airport outside Baku in the Soviet Union's Azerbaijan Soviet Socialist Republic. While the crew attempts to return the airliner to the airport, it strikes an oil platform in the Neftyanyye Kamni oil field and crashes into the Caspian Sea about 45 kilometers (28 miles) east of Baku, killing 56 of the 64 people on board.
- August 22 – Flying in near-zero visibility, an Avianca Douglas DC-3A-228F (registration HK-111) crashes into a hill at an altitude of 480 meters (1,570 feet) near Yopal, Colombia, killing 16 of the 17 people on board.
- August 25 – A hijacker commandeers a Yemen Airways Douglas DC-6 with 16 people on board during a flight from Taiz, Yemen Arab Republic, to Asmara, Ethiopia, demanding to be flown to Kuwait. After a refueling stop at Djibouti City, Djibouti, the airliner flies to Kuwait, where the hijacker surrenders.
- August 27 – An Aerocondor Lockheed L-188A Electra (registration HK-777) crashes into the side of cloud-covered Cerro el Cable mountain shortly after takeoff from El Dorado International Airport in Bogotá, Colombia, and breaks up, killing all 42 people on board.
- August 28 – On a night approach to Torrejón Air Base in Madrid, Spain, at a speed of 250 knots (288 mph (463 km/h), a United States Air Force Lockheed C-141A-10-LM Starlifter strikes the ground at an altitude of 3,050 feet (930 meters), becomes airborne again, rolls over, and crashes inverted into a ravine, killing 24 of the 25 people on board.

=== September ===
- September 11
  - Israeli aerial photography reveals that Syria is building up military forces in forward areas near the Israeli-Syrian border.
  - A JAT Yugoslav Airlines Sud Aviation SE-210 Caravelle 6-N crashes on Maganik mountain near Titograd, Yugoslavia, killing all 41 people on board.
  - An AVE Mizar flying car prototype breaks up in flight over Oxnard, California killing the company founder and the pilot.
- September 13 – A patrol of Syrian MiG-21 (NATO reporting name "Fishbed") fighters attacks a flight of Israeli Air Force Mirage and F-4 Phantom II aircraft over the Mediterranean Sea off the coast of Syria. One Mirage and 13 MiG-21s are shot down.
- September 20 – Singer-songwriters Jim Croce and Maury Muehleisen and four others die in the crash of a commercial Beechcraft E18S shortly after takeoff from Natchitoches Regional Airport in Natchitoches, Louisiana.
- September 27 – Texas International Airlines Flight 655, a Convair 600, crashes into Black Fork Mountain in Arkansas, killing all 11 people on board. The wreckage is found on September 30.
- September 30 – Aeroflot Flight 3932, a Tupolev Tu-104B (registration CCCP-42506), crashes shortly after takeoff from Koltsovo Airport in Sverdlovsk in the Soviet Union's Russian Soviet Federated Socialist Republic, killing all 108 people on board.

=== October ===
- Aeroperú, the flag carrier of Peru, begins flight operations with a fleet of three Fokker F28 Fellowships. Its first flight is from Lima to Cusco.
- October 2
  - An Aeroflot Antonov An-12TB (registration CCCP-12967) cargo plane strays off course while attempting a go-around at Sokol Airport in Magadan Oblast in the Soviet Union's Russian Soviet Federated Socialist Republic and crashes into a hillside 13.7 kilometers (8.5 miles) from the runway, killing all 10 people on board.
  - A lone hijacker attempts to commander a KLM Douglas DC-9 carrying 26 other people on a flight from Düsseldorf, West Germany, to Amsterdam, the Netherlands. The airliner's passengers and crew overpower the hijacker, and there are no fatalities.
- October 3 – Israeli Air Force photography detects the Syrian deployment of armored division artillery near the Israeli-Syrian border.
- October 4 – Israeli Air Force photography reveals that Egypt has massed tanks, artillery, and equipment for crossing the Suez Canal behind its infantry divisions along the canal.
- October 6
  - Egypt and Syria launch air strikes on Israel at 1405 local time, starting the Yom Kippur War, with the Syrian Air Force flying 42 strike sorties during the day and the Egyptian Air Force flying 130. The Israeli Air Force flies 197 sorties over the Sinai Peninsula, losing five aircraft before dark in combat with the Egyptians.
  - A Syrian airmobile operation assists in the capture of Mount Hermon from Israeli forces.
  - Egyptian helicopters carry commandos to the vicinities of Ras Sudar and Tel Farma and to points east of Tasa and north of Abu Rudeis in the Sinai Peninsula.
- October 7
  - Shortly after beginning a planned daylong series of attacks on Egyptian air defenses along the Suez Canal, the Israeli Air Force cancels them and reverses its operations to blunt a threatening Syrian ground offensive that has almost reached the Jordan River. Although it suffers heavy losses to Syrian 2K12 Kub (NATO reporting name "SA-6 Gainful") and Strela 2 (NATO reporting name "SA-7 Grail") surface-to-air missiles, it halts the Syrian offensive and over the next two days assists Israeli ground forces in pushing the Syrians back.
  - Twenty-four hours after the Yom Kippur War began, the Israeli Air Force has lost 30 aircraft in combat with the Egyptians.
- October 9 – The Israeli Air Force bombs Damascus, Syria, allegedly in retaliation for Syrian 9K52 Luna-M (NATO reporting name "FROG-7") artillery rocket attacks on Israeli civilian targets.
- October 10
  - The Soviet Union begins an airlift in support of Arab forces fighting in the Yom Kippur War with 21 Antonov An-12 (NATO reporting name "Cub") flights into Damascus, Syria. The Soviet airlift maintains a rate of about 30 sorties a day through October 12, after which it escalates to 100 per day. Before it ends, it will deliver 16,000 short tons (14,515 metric tons) of supplies and equipment in 935 sorties, with An-12s making deliveries to Syria and Antonov An-22s (NATO reporting name "Cock") flying to Egypt.
  - Aircraft of the Israeli airline El Al, their markings painted over to prevent recognition, begin an airlift of supplies and equipment from the United States to Israel, with the first flight departing Norfolk, Virginia. El Al will deliver a total of 5,500 short tons (4,990 metric tons) in 250 flights.
  - A hijacker commandeers a Mexicana de Aviación Boeing 727 bound from Mexico City to Monterrey. Police storm the plane at Mexico City and arrest the hijacker.
- October 11 – Three men opposed to the regime of President of the Philippines Ferdinand Marcos hijack a Philippine Air Lines BAC One-Eleven with 58 people on board during a domestic flight in the Philippines from Davao City to Bacolod. During a refueling stop in Manila, they exchange the other 48 passengers for Philippine Air Lines president Benigno Toda Jr. With Toda and the airliner's seven crew members aboard, the hijackers force the plane to take off and fly to Hong Kong, where they surrender to the authorities.
- October 13
  - The United States begins to transfer aircraft to the Israeli Air Force. The total of aircraft transferred will reach 36 F-4 Phantom IIs, 20 A-4 Skyhawks, and 12 C-130 Hercules during the Yom Kippur War.
  - Aeroflot Flight 964, a Tupolev Tu-104B (registration CCCP-42486), suffers an electrical power failure and goes into a steep downward spiral from an altitude of 1,300 feet (400 meters) while on approach to Domodedovo Airport in Moscow in darkness and poor weather. It crashes 17 kilometers (11 miles) northwest of the airport, killing all 122 people on board. The crash is the deadliest involving a Tu-104 and at the time is the second-deadliest aviation accident in history on the territory of the Russian Soviet Federated Socialist Republic.
- October 14 – A massive U.S. Air Force airlift to Israel begins, including the delivery of tanks by C-5A Galaxy transports. Making 14,000-mile (22,544-km) round trips, they will deliver 22,400 short tons (20,321 metric tons) of supplies and equipment in 564 sorties.
- October 18 – Upset by the launch of the French-Italian comedy film The Mad Adventures of Rabbi Jacob promoted by her husband, French film producer and publicist Georges Cravenne, because she views it as anti-Palestinian, Danièle Cravenne uses a .22-caliber pistol to hijack an Air France Boeing 727-228 (registration F-BPJC) with 110 people on board making a domestic flight in France from Paris to Nice, demanding that the movie not open, that all motor traffic in France be halted for 24 hours, and that she be flown to Cairo, Egypt. The captain talks her into letting him land at Marseille, France, to refuel. After the airliner lands at Marseille-Marignane Airport, Cravenne lets all the passengers and most of the crew disembark, after which several French police officers disguised as maintenance personnel board the plane and shoot her to death.
- October 20 – Four hijackers commandeer an Aerolineas Argentinas Boeing 737-287C with 57 people on board during a domestic flight in Argentina from Buenos Aires to Salta. They force the airliner to fly to Tucumán, Argentina, where they demand that it be refueled so that they can fly to Lima, Peru, and then on to Cuba. After authorities refuse to allow the plane to be refueled at Tucumán, the hijackers order it to take off again. It flies to Yacuiba Airport in Yacuíba, Bolivia, where the hijackers release 38 passengers. They finally surrender at Yacuíba on October 24 after receiving assurances that the authorities would allow them to leave Bolivia.
- October 23 – VASP Flight 012, a NAMC YS-11A-211 (registration PP-SMJ), loses power during takeoff from Santos Dumont Airport in Rio de Janeiro, Brazil. Its crew aborts the takeoff immediately, but braking action is poor, so the crew retracts the landing gear. The airliner slides on its belly into Guanabara Bay, killing eight of the 65 people on board.
- October 24 (October 25 in the Middle East) – In response to a Soviet threat to intervene militarily against Israel in the Yom Kippur War, President Richard Nixon puts the United States Armed Forces on alert at Defense Readiness Condition (DEFCON) 3, which includes a minimal redeployment of U.S. Air Force B-52 Stratofortresses and other bombers as a preliminary preparation in case of a strategic nuclear exchange with the Soviet Union.
- October 25 – A ceasefire ends the Yom Kippur War. Israel has lost 103 fighters and six helicopters during the 18 days of fighting.
- October 31 – A hijacker commandeers an Avensa Douglas DC-9-14 during a domestic flight in Venezuela from Barquisimeto to Caracas. He shoots and seriously wounds himself and is arrested after the airliner lands at Caracas.

=== November ===
- November 2 – Four hijackers commandeer an Aeroflot Yakovlev Yak-40 during a domestic flight in the Soviet Union from Bryansk to Moscow, demanding money and to be flown to Sweden. After the airliner lands in Moscow, Soviet security forces storm it and bring the hijacking to an end. There are two fatalities.
- November 3
  - After smoke begins to fill Pan American World Airways Flight 160, a Boeing 707-321C freighter carrying 52,912 pounds (24,000 kg) of cargo – including 15,360 pounds (6,970 kg) of chemicals – and a crew of three flying from New York City to Glasgow, Scotland, its crew attempts to divert to Logan International Airport in Boston, Massachusetts, but it crashes just short of the runway, killing the entire crew.
  - The number three engine of National Airlines Flight 27, a Douglas DC-10-10, explodes while the aircraft is over New Mexico. Fragments penetrate the fuselage, causing one passenger to be sucked from the plane; his body is found two years later. The aircraft lands safely.
- November 12 – Lufthansa inaugurates Douglas DC-10 service with a DC-10-30 flight.
- November 13 – Friendship International Airport in Baltimore, Maryland, is renamed Baltimore–Washington International Airport.
- November 17 – Apparently attempting to divert to Chu Lai Air Base in Chu Lai, South Vietnam, after receiving word from air traffic controllers that its intended destination, Quảng Ngãi Airfield outside Quảng Ngãi, South Vietnam, had flooded, an Air Vietnam Douglas C-47B-10-DK Skytrain (registration XV-NIE) strays off course and crashes into the nearly vertical wall of a mountain 20 kilometers (12 miles) north-northwest of Quảng Ngai at an altitude of about 400 meters (1,300 feet), killing all 27 people on board.
- November 23 – An improvised explosive device detonates aboard Argo 16, an Italian Air Force C-47 Dakota used by the Italian Secret Service and the U.S. Central Intelligence Agency for electronic surveillance over the Adriatic Sea and to interfere with Yugoslavia's radar network, causing the aircraft to crash at Marghera, Italy, killing all four people on board.
- November 25 – Three young members of the Arab Nationalist Youth Organization hijack the KLM Boeing 747-206B Mississippi, operating as Flight 861 with 264 people on board, over Iraq. The plane first flies to Malta, where the hijackers release eight female flight attendants and most of the passengers, then proceeds with 11 passengers on board to Dubai, where the hijacking ends without further incident.
- November 27
  - Delta Air Lines Flight 516, a Douglas DC-9-32, crashes short of the runway at Chattanooga Metropolitan Airport in Chattanooga, Tennessee, injuring 26 of the 79 people on board.
  - Landing in light rain and fog, Eastern Airlines Flight 300, a Douglas DC-9-31 (registration N8967E) overruns the runway while landing at Akron-Canton Airport in Green, Ohio, crossing 110 feet (34 meters) of unpaved ground and plunging over a 38-foot (12-meter) embankment before coming to rest. All 26 people on board survive.
- November 29 – During a commercial fight, an airliner strikes a Rüppell's griffon vulture at an altitude of 37,000 feet (11,000 meters) over Abidjan, Ivory Coast, the highest bird strike ever recorded. The airliner loses power in one engine but lands safely.
- November 30
  - The Government of Australia′s Department of Civil Aviation merges with the Department of Shipping and Transport to form the new Department of Transport. The new department's Air Transport Group takes over the roles and missions of the former Department of Civil Aviation.
  - American actor Bruce Yarnell and his two passengers die when the Beechcraft Musketeer he is piloting crashes in Los Angeles County, California, near Gorman.

=== December ===
- December 1 – A hijacker aboard a Swissair Douglas DC-8 with 145 people on board bound from Geneva to Zurich, Switzerland, demands an airline ticket to New York City and US$50,000 for starvation in Africa. Security forces storm the airliner at Geneva and arrest the hijacker.
- December 7 – Landing at Domodedovo Airport in Moscow, Aeroflot Flight 964, a Tupolev Tu-104B (registration CCCP-42503), slides off the runway into snow and catches fire, killing 16 of the 75 people on board.
- December 15 – An Aircraft Pool Leasing Corporation Lockheed L-1049H Super Constellation freighter (registration N6917C) carrying a cargo of Christmas trees to Caracas, Venezuela, crashes just after takeoff from Miami International Airport in Miami, Florida. The plane strikes high-tension lines and a tree, crashes into a parking lot, then hits several houses and other property before coming to rest. The crash kills the plane's entire crew of three and six people on the ground.
- December 16 – After its crew loses control of it due to an electrical short circuit, Aeroflot Flight 2022, a Tupolev Tu-124V (registration CCCP-45061), crashes near Karacharovo in the Soviet Union's Russian Soviet Federated Socialist Republic, killing all 51 people on board.
- December 17 – Between six and 10 Palestinian terrorists attack the Leonardo da Vinci-Fiumicino Airport terminal in Rome, Italy, with automatic firearms and grenades, killing two people. They then throw grenades through the open doors of the Pan American World Airways Boeing 707-321B Clipper Celestial, operating as Flight 110 with 177 people on board, just as it is preparing to taxi for departure; 30 people aboard the plane die and 20 are injured. Five other gunmen storm a Lufthansa Boeing 737, bringing aboard 10 hostages and taking the crew of four on board hostage as well. On December 18, after 16 hours on the ground, during which time they murder one and injure another hostage, they dump the injured hostage and the body of the murdered one off the 737 and order it to fly to Athens, Greece; the plane then spends another 16 hours on the ground in Athens before proceeding to a landing at Damascus, Syria. Finally, the 737 flies to Kuwait, where the five hijackers release the 12 remaining hostages and are given free passage off the plane.
- December 22 – A Royal Air Maroc Sud Aviation SE-210 Caravelle VIN (registration OO-SRD) goes off course during a turn to begin a descent in rain and darkness to Tangier, Morocco. It crashes into Mount Mellaline near Tétouan, Morocco, at an altitude of 2,300 feet (700 meters), killing all 106 people on board.
- December 23 – An Aeroflot Tupolev Tu-124V (registration CCCP-45044) suffers an engine failure, fuel-line rupture, and in-flight fire shortly after takeoff from Lviv-Snilow Airport in Lviv in the Soviet Union's Ukrainian Soviet Socialist Republic. It crashes near Vinniki, killing all 17 people on board.

== First flights ==
- AVE Mizar (mid-1973)
- Sorrell SNS-7 Hiperbipe

=== January ===
- January 4 – Gates Learjet 35/36
- October 7 – Cameron D96 Hot-Air Airship G-BAMK

=== February ===
- February 7 – McDonnell Douglas C-9B Skytrain II 159113

=== March ===
- March 1 – Fournier RF-6
- March 31 – Aerospace General Mini-Copter

=== April ===
- April 10 – Boeing T-43 71-1403
- April 17 – PZL-106 Kruk

=== May ===
- May 11 – Dassault Falcon 30 F-WAMD
- May 30 – WSK-Mielec M-15 Belphegor

=== June ===
- June – IAI Kfir
- June 13 – Boeing E-4

=== July ===
- July 7 – Mylius My 102 Tornado
- July 19 – Bellanca Aries
- July 25 – Beets Special
- July 26 – Sikorsky XH-59A
- July 28 – Boeing YQM-94 B-Gull

=== August ===
- August 1 – Martin Marietta X-24B – unpowered flight
- August 5 – Trident Trigull CF-TRI-X
- August 21 – Aerosport Scamp
- August 22 – Learjet 35

=== September ===
- Air Tractor AT-301
- September 2 – Coates Swalesong
- September 6 – Garrison Melmoth
- September 14 – Glasflügel 205 Club Libelle
- September 21 – Beechcraft YT-34C, prototype of the T-34C Turbo-Mentor
- September 25 – MBB Bö 106 D-HDCI

=== October ===
- October 3 – SZD-41 Jantar Standard
- October 8 – RFB Fanliner D-EJFL
- October 10 – Eiri-Avion PIK-20
- October 26 – Dassault-Breguet/Dornier Alpha Jet

=== November ===
- November 15 – Martin Marietta X-24B (first powered flight)
- November 23 – AIDC T-CH-1

== Entered service ==
- Sorrell SNS-7 Hiperbipe

=== April ===
- April 16 – Embraer EMB 110 Bandeirante with Transbrasil

== Deadliest crash ==
The deadliest crash of this year was the Kano air disaster in which an Alia Boeing 707 chartered by Nigeria Airways crashed while attempting to land in Kano, Nigeria, on 22 January; 176 of the 202 people on board were killed. The second deadliest of 1973 took place only 5 months before, when Varig Flight 820, also a Boeing 707 which crashed near Orly Airport on 11 July, 123 of the 134 people on board were killed
