= MBB Bo 209 Monsun =

Two-seat light single engine aircraft designed by Bölkow

Bo 209 Monsun
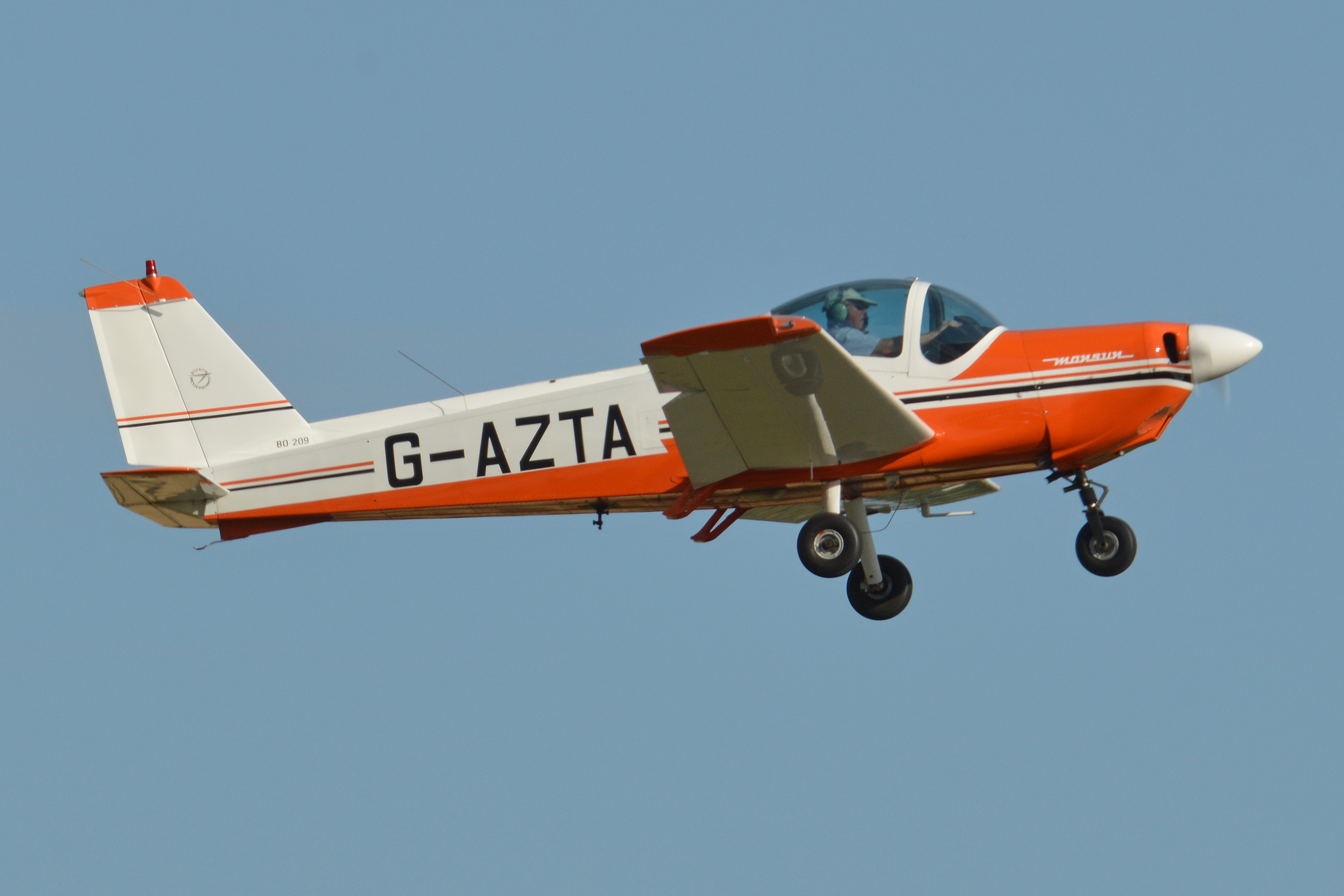

General information
- Type: Civil utility aircraft
- National origin: West Germany
- Manufacturer: Bölkow; MBB
- Number built: 2 MHK-101 and 102 Bo 209

History
- First flight: 22 December 1967 (MHK-101)
- Developed into: Mylius My-103 Mistral

The MBB Bo 209 Monsun (originally the Bölkow MHK-101) is a two-seat light aircraft that was designed by the West German company Bölkow and originally produced by Messerschmitt-Bölkow-Blohm (MBB).

The Bo 209 was designed during the mid-1960s, initially as a modest undertaking, to produce a successor to the Bölkow Bo 208. It was a more versatile aircraft that possessed a larger cockpit and a new foldable wing while also retaining some commonality with the Bo 208. The cockpit could be furnished with a wide array of instrumentation options. On 22 December 1967, the first prototype conducted its maiden flight. In April 1969, the type was formally selected to replace the Bo 208 in production; the Bo 209 made its first public appearance later that same year. However, in March 1972, MBB (into which Bölkow had merged) announced that it would terminate production of the Bo 209 after completing 100 aircraft.

There have been several efforts since the early 1970s to produce the Bo 209. The first was by the German firm Pneuma-Technik E. Ficht, which established Monson Gmbh to produce the type at Weiden, Bavaria, but only two aircraft were finished before production ended during June 1974. During the mid-1970s, an American investor sought to setup production of the Bo 209 in Georgia; this effort, which was undertaken in coordination with MBB, did not achieve quantity production and collapsed amid the investor's financial difficulties. During the late 1990s, a highly revised version of the Bo 209 was launched by Mylius Flugzeugwerk GmbH & Co KG, a Bitburg-based firm that Dr. Mylius's son, Albert Mylius, was involved in; two models, the Mylius My 102 Tornado and Mylius My-103 Mistral, were developed.

== Design and development ==
The Monsun was designed by three Bölkow engineers, headed by Bölkow's technical director Dr Hermann Mylius, in their spare time with the intention of creating a more versatile aircraft than the Bölkow Bo 208; design work commenced during 1965. The needs and preferences of international aviators, such as in the North American market, was taken into account during this design process, a focus that led to the future aircraft possessing a high degree of versatility. Amongst other things, it was designed to be stored in domestic garages rather than hangars (as an economy measure) as well as the ability to retract the nose gear on the ground to better permit it to be towed.

The resulting aircraft, designated the MHK-101, was a low-wing monoplane of all-metal construction with a tricycle undercarriage, which had fixed mainwheels along with the option for the nosewheel to be fixed or retractable. While the MHK-101 shared several components of the preceding Bo-208, it had a larger and more comfortable cockpit, and an entirely new wing, which could be folded for towing and storage (the Bo 208 was a high-wing aircraft). The cockpit, which was fitted with deeply padded seats and a tinted bubble canopy, was designed to accommodate sophisticated instrumentation, which could be fitted upon customer request. Optional equipment has included a transponder, navcom, VHF omnidirectional range, automatic direction finder, ice detector, emergency locator beacon, and various audio systems.

On 22 December 1967, the first prototype MHK-101, powered by a 125 hp (93 kW) Lycoming O-235 engine driving a fixed-pitch propeller and with a retractable nosewheel, performed its maiden flight. It quickly proved itself to be a manoeuvrable and responsive aircraft; being designed to withstand up to three negative Gs and six positive Gs, it was considered to be suitable for performing aerobatics. Somewhat unusually, in place of conventional toe brakes, hand-actuated brakes were fitted instead.

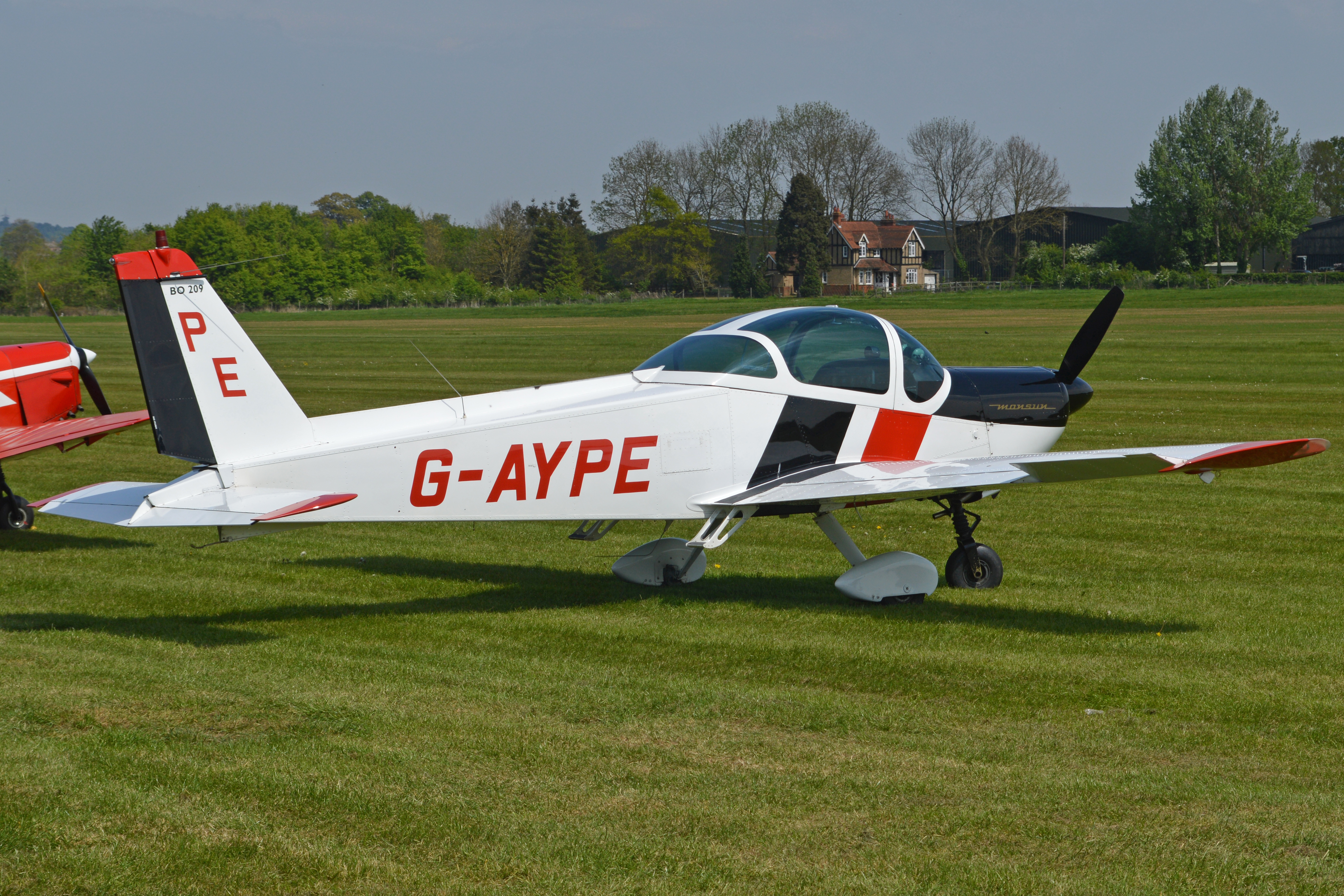
A MBB Bo 209, 2017

In April 1969, Bölkow selected the MK-101 to replace the Bo 208 in production, with the type becoming the "Bölkow Bo 209 Monson". One month later, the second prototype made its first flight. That same year, the type made its first public appearance at the Paris Air Show. Furthermore, Messerschmitt-Bölkow merged with Blohm & Voss to become Messerschmitt-Bölkow-Blohm, with the aircraft becoming the MBB Bo 209.

The aircraft, which was offered with a variety of engines, a choice of fixed or variable pitch propellers and fixed or retractable nosewheels, entered production at MBB's Laupheim factory early in 1970 and received its type certificate on 9 April 1970. A considerable number of components, most prominently the Lycoming O-320 engine, were imported from the United States.

By the time of the company's display of the aircraft at the Hanover Air Show in 1970, 57 orders of the new type had been secured and commercial success of the project seemed to be well on course. However, in March 1972, MBB opted to terminate production of the Bo 209; one motivating factor was to concentrate the firm's resources on the MBB Bo 105 helicopter. A total of 100 Bo 209s were produced in addition to the two prototypes.

The rights to the Bo 208 were put up for sale and promptly acquired by the German company Pneuma-Technik E. Ficht; it restarted production of the Monsun at Weiden, Bavaria, setting up Monson Gmbh in November 1973, but only two aircraft were completed prior to production ending for a second time during June 1974.

During the mid-1970s, an American businessman opted to invest in the Bo 209; this scheme did progress to the extent that funding was secured and the shipping of both factory equipment and inventory to Georgia had commenced with the intention of producing the type in the US. However, before this transition had been completed, the endeavour came to an abrupt end when the businessman committed suicide after losses in stock market speculation. Consequently, only two complete Bo 209s were believed to be operating in North America by the end of the decade. While further approaches were made by prospective investors to resume production of the type, MBB's management was reportedly reluctant to commit to such proposals.

During the late 1990s, Dr. Mylius's son, Albert Mylius, completed a totally revised version of his father's design under a new company, Mylius Flugzeugwerk GmbH & Co KG, based in Bitburg. Two models were produced, the Mylius My 102 Tornado, a single seat developed as a low cost aerobatic airplane, and the twin-seat Mylius My-103 Mistral. These aircraft feature numerous variations over the original Bo 209 design, including a wider cockpit, a more powerful 200 hp engine, better handling characteristics and improved overall performance (including aerobatic rating).

== Variants ==
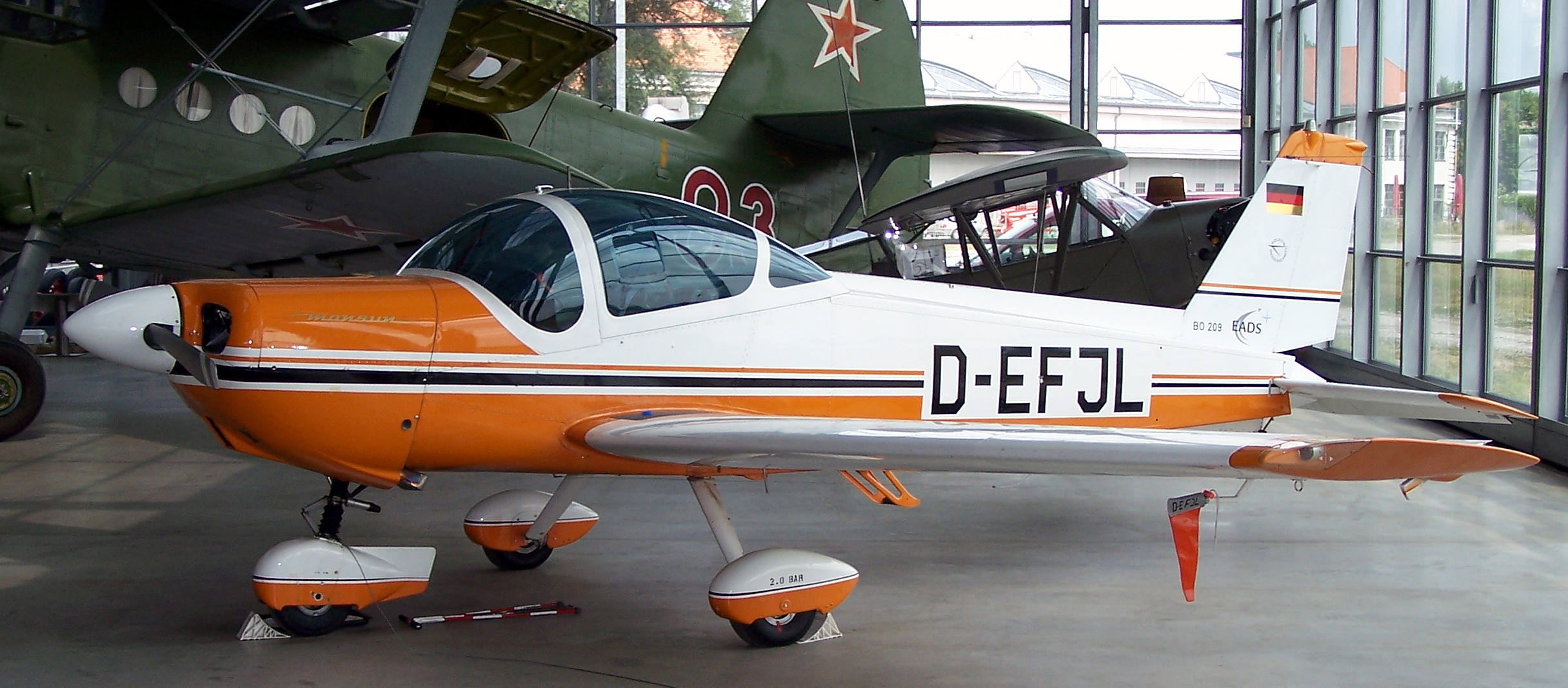

- MHK-101 prototype
- Bo 209-125 - proposed production version with 125 hp (93 kW) Lycoming O-235 engine. No production.
- Bo 209-150 - production version with 150 hp (110 kW) Lycoming O-320-E1C engine.
- Bo 209-160 - production version with 160 hp (120 kW) Lycoming IO-320-D1A engine.
- Bo 209S - trainer version with dual controls, non-retracting nosewheel, and non-folding wings, powered by 130 hp (97 kW) Rolls-Royce Continental O-240-A.

== Specifications (Bo 209-160) ==
Data from Jane's All The World's Aircraft 1971-72

General characteristics

- Crew: one
- Capacity: one passenger
- Length: 6.60 m (21 ft 8 in)
- Wingspan: 8.40 m (27 ft 7 in)
- Height: 2.20 m (7 ft 3 in)
- Wing area: 10.22 m^{2} (110.0 sq ft)
- Aspect ratio: 6.8:1
- Airfoil: NACA 64215 at root, NACA 64212 at tip
- Empty weight: 484 kg (1,067 lb)
- Max takeoff weight: 820 kg (1,808 lb)
- Fuel capacity: 140 L (37 US gal; 31 imp gal)
- Powerplant: 1 × Lycoming O-320-D1A air-cooled flat-four engine, 120 kW (160 hp)

Performance

- Maximum speed: 274 km/h (170 mph, 148 kn) at sea level
- Cruise speed: 243 km/h (151 mph, 131 kn) at 2,400 metres (8,000 ft) (econ. cruise, 65% power)
- Stall speed: 100 km/h (62 mph, 54 kn) (flaps down)
- Never exceed speed: 320 km/h (200 mph, 170 kn)
- Range: 1,200 km (750 mi, 650 nmi) (65% power, no reserves)
- Endurance: five hours and 14 minutes
- Service ceiling: 5,520 m (18,110 ft)
- Rate of climb: 6.0 m/s (1,180 ft/min)
- Time to altitude: Two minutes and 48 seconds to 1,000 m (3,300 ft)

== See also ==
Related development

- Mylius My-103 Mistral

Aircraft of comparable role, configuration, and era

- Piper PA-38 Tomahawk
- Beechcraft 77 Skipper
