= Flight 141 =

Flight 141 may refer to:

- Aeroflot Flight 141, crashed on 19 February 19 1973
- UTA Flight 141, crashed on 25 December 2003
