= Stolp Acroduster =

American homebuilt aircraft

Acroduster I SA700
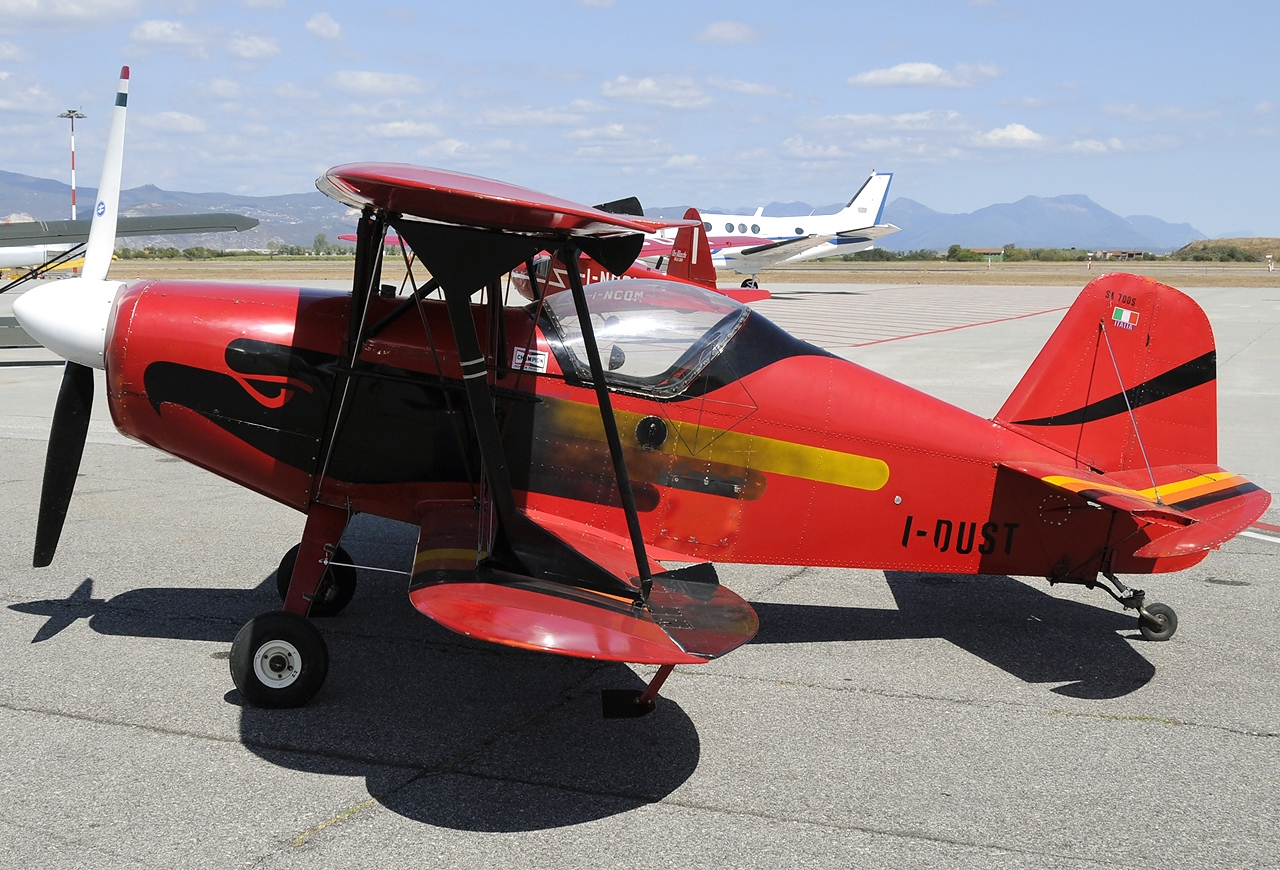

General information
- Type: Homebuilt aerobatic biplane
- National origin: United States
- Manufacturer: Stolp Starduster Corporation
- Designer: Jim Osborne

The Acroduster I SA700 is an American single-seat homebuilt aerobatic biplane.

== Development ==
The Acroduster was an elliptical-winged biplane built with the intention of competing against the Pitts Special.

== Design ==
The aircraft also owes some of its design to the Midget Mustang. The fuselage is of aluminum construction rather than the popular tube and fabric for the type. The wings are similar to the Stolp Starduster. Roll rate is 240 degrees per second.

== Variants ==
- Beets Special Marketed by Stolp.

== Specifications (Acroduster 1) ==
Data from Buy planes for sale

General characteristics

- Length: 15.8 ft (4.8 m)
- Wingspan: 19 ft (5.8 m)
- Wing area: 105 sq ft (9.8 m^{2})
- Empty weight: 740 lb (336 kg)
- Gross weight: 1,190 lb (540 kg)

Performance

- Cruise speed: 143 kn (165 mph, 265 km/h)
- Stall speed: 61 kn (70 mph, 113 km/h)
- Range: 300 nmi (345 mi, 555 km)
- Service ceiling: 12,000 ft (3,700 m)
- Rate of climb: 3,000 ft/min (15 m/s)

== See also ==
- Stolp SA-300 Starduster Too
