= Mylius My-103 Mistral =

My-103 Mistral
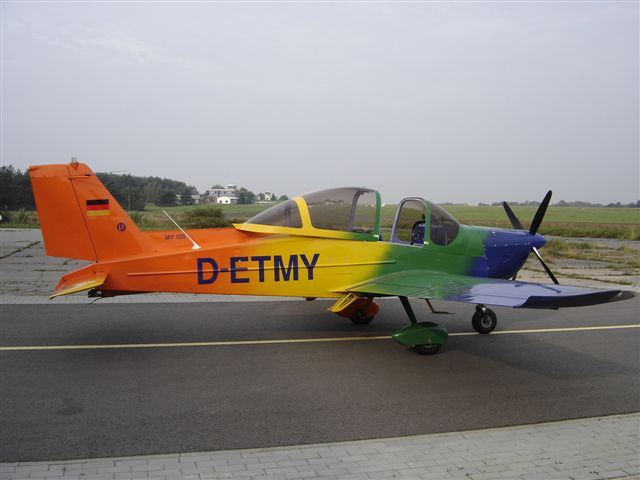
- Prototype in 2006

General information
- Type: Trainer, aerobatic
- National origin: Germany/Colombia
- Manufacturer: Mylius Flugzeugwerk
- Designer: Albert Mylius
- Number built: 4

History
- First flight: 23 May 1998
- Developed from: MBB Bo 209 Monsun

The Mylius My-103 Mistral is a German two-seat aerobatic trainer of utility aircraft produced by Mylius Flugzeugwerk of Bitburg.

== Design and development ==
The My-103 is a two-seat development of the My-102 Tornado which was itself a development of the MHK-101. The MHK-101 was an early 1970s proof of concept prototype which led to the MBB Bo 209 Monsun, it had been designed by Hermann Mylius the father of Albert Mylius who had founded Mylius Flugzeugwerk in 1996. The first flight of the My-103/200 basic trainer prototype D-ETMY was on 23 May 1998 which was followed by the first pre-production aircraft in July 2001.

The My-103 is an all-metal low-wing monoplane with a fixed tricycle landing gear, the prototype basic trainer had a 200 hp (149 kW) Lycoming AEIO-360 flat-four engine. It has two-seats side-by-side with dual controls and a rear-sliding bubble canopy and a fixed windscreen. A four-seat variant the My-104 was proposed but no further aircraft have been built.

== Colombian production ==
Aero Integration & Manufacturing S.A.S. (AIMING) and INDAER announced in July 2013 plans to certify and produce the Mylius My-103 in Medellín, Colombia. [1] The aircraft was intended to be manufactured by INDAER utilizing new avionics and locally trained staff. German aircraft designer Albert Mylius was to provide technical support. However, the project faced challenges in securing sufficient customer interest and funding for certification and manufacturing. Consequently, the My-103 production initiative was suspended in 2018.

== Variants ==
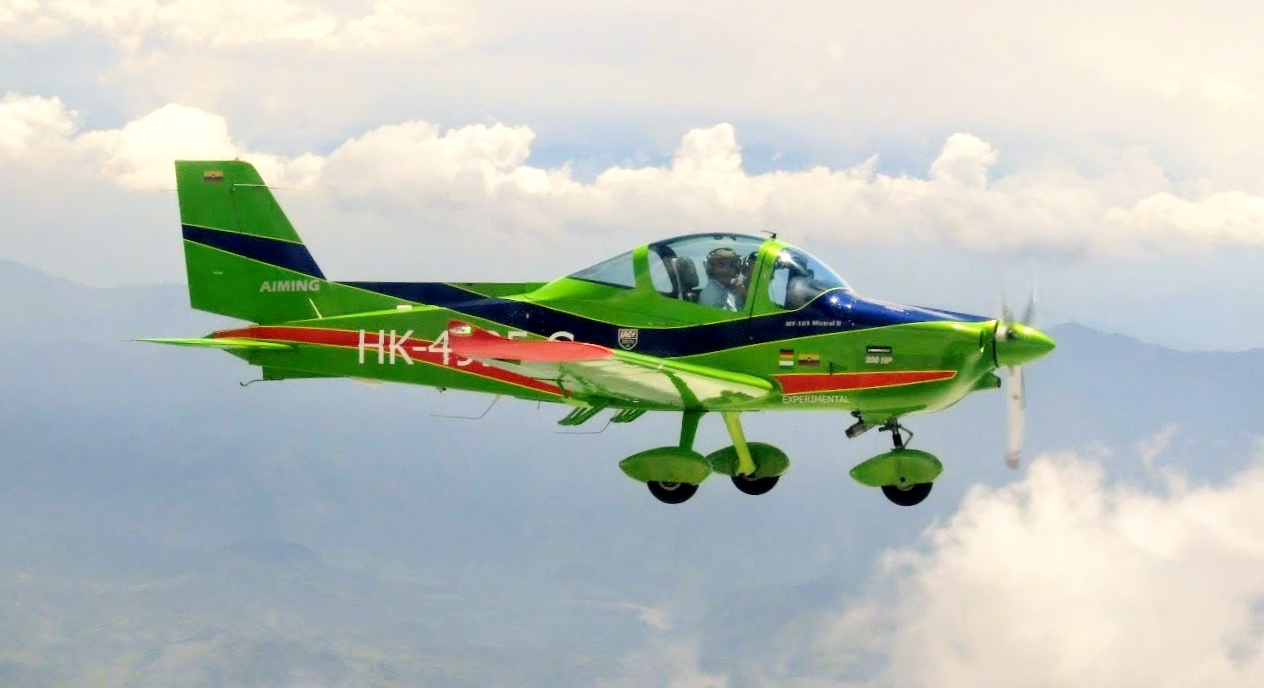
MY-103 (HK-4995G) in flight

My-102
Single-seat aerobatic trainer or tourer, two built.
My-103/180
Two-seat basic variant with a 180 hp (134 kW) Lycoming IO-360 engine, not built.
My-103/200
Two-seat basic trainer with a 200 hp (149 kW) Lycoming AEIO-360 engine, four built.
My-104
Four-seat variant with a 200 hp (149 kW) Lycoming IO-360 engine, not built.

== Specifications (My-103/200) ==
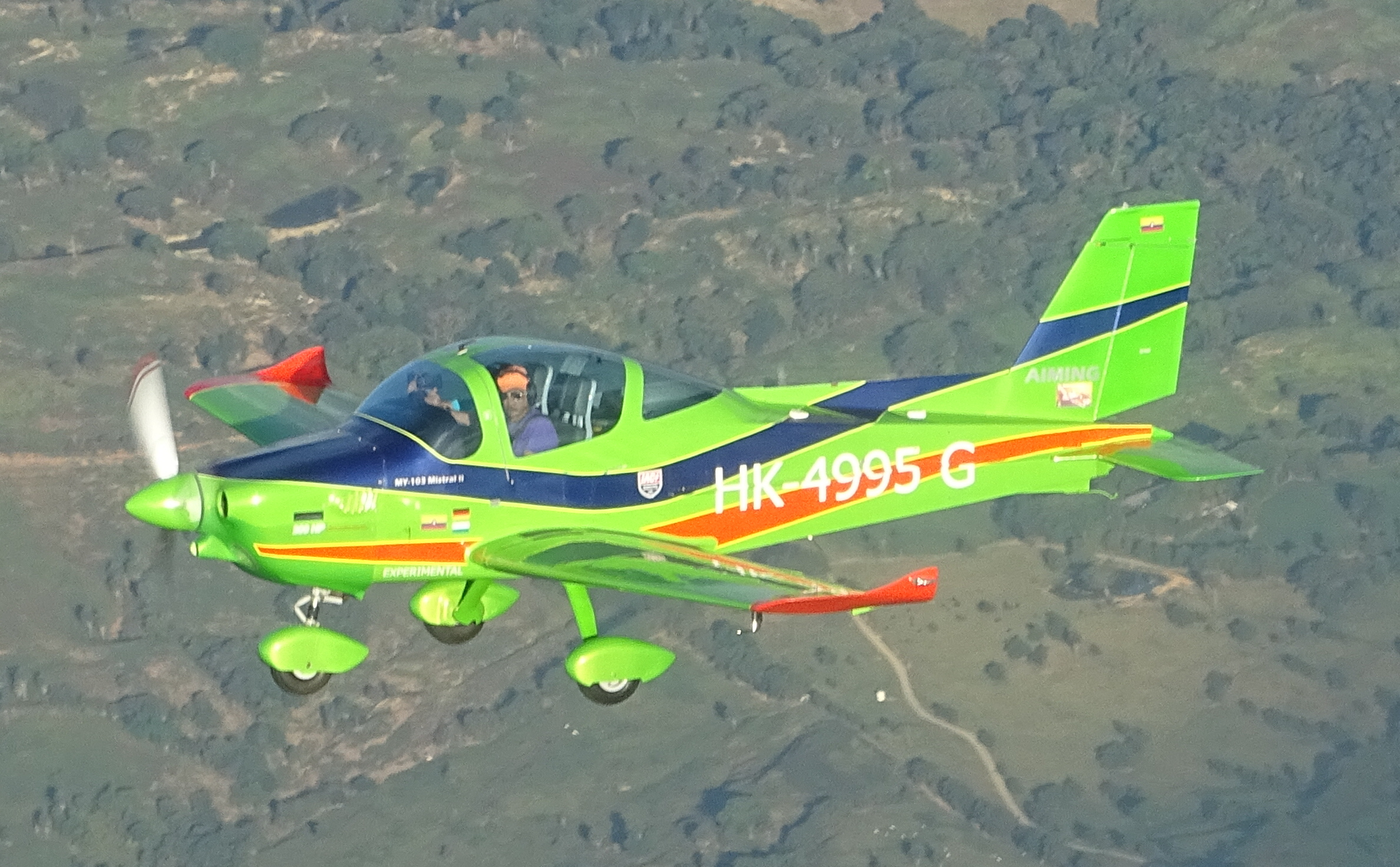
MY-103 Mistral. Aircraft S/N 002 (HK-4995G) in flight over Colombia during testing in 2016

Data from Jane's All the World's Aircraft 2003-2004.

General characteristics

- Crew: 2
- Length: 6.50 m (21 ft 4 in)
- Wingspan: 8.65 m (28 ft 5 in)
- Height: 2.34 m (7 ft 8 in)
- Wing area: 10.45 m^{2} (112.5 sq ft)
- Empty weight: 620 kg (1,367 lb)
- Max takeoff weight: 950 kg (2,094 lb)
- Powerplant: 1 × Lycoming AEIO-360 flat-four, 150 kW (200 hp)
- Propellers: 3-bladed MTV constant speed

Performance

- Maximum speed: 278 km/h (173 mph, 150 kn) max cruise speed at 2440m
- Cruise speed: 259 km/h (161 mph, 140 kn) economical cruise at 3660m
- Stall speed: 112 km/h (70 mph, 60 kn) power off, flaps down
- Never exceed speed: 333 km/h (207 mph, 180 kn)
- Range: 1,574 km (978 mi, 850 nmi)
- Service ceiling: 6,100 m (20,000 ft)
- g limits: +6/-4.5
- Rate of climb: 6.0 m/s (1,180 ft/min)

== See also ==
Related development

- MBB Bo 209 Monsun
