= Freeze alarm =

Device that warns of dangerously low temperatures

A freeze alarm (also called a low-temperature alarm or freeze monitor) is a device that tracks ambient temperature and issues an alert when the temperature falls below a user-defined threshold. Its chief purpose is to warn property owners early enough to prevent freeze-related damage such as burst water pipes, failed heating systems, or losses to temperature-sensitive goods. Repairing a single burst pipe in a residence can cost well over US$10,000 on average, making proactive warnings financially attractive.

== Operation and features ==
Most freeze alarms combine a temperature sensor with either a local indicator or a remote communication module. A typical residential set-point is between 10–13 °C (50–55 °F), providing a margin above the freezing point of water. Early products such as the Honeywell “Winter Watchman” used a simple thermostat that closed a circuit to flash a lamp when indoor temperature dropped, alerting neighbours passing by. Contemporary units use solid-state sensors and microcontrollers, allowing adjustable thresholds, continuous logging, and multi-condition monitoring (e.g. power loss, humidity, water leaks, or smoke-alarm sound detection).

- Local-only alerts use a siren or flashing beacon—such as the battery-powered “Freeze Flash” window light—to attract the attention of neighbours.
- Remote-notification alarms contact designated recipients through telephone, SMS, e-mail, or push notification, a critical feature for unattended properties.

== Applications ==
Freeze alarms are common in:

- Seasonal homes and cabins left vacant during winter.
- Primary residences as part of home-security or environmental-monitoring systems; many alarm panels support dedicated freeze sensors.
- Greenhouses and agriculture where heater failure can damage crops in hours.
- Industrial and cold-chain logistics; single-use freeze indicators warn if pharmaceuticals or perishables have been exposed to 0 °C (32 °F) or below.

== Types ==
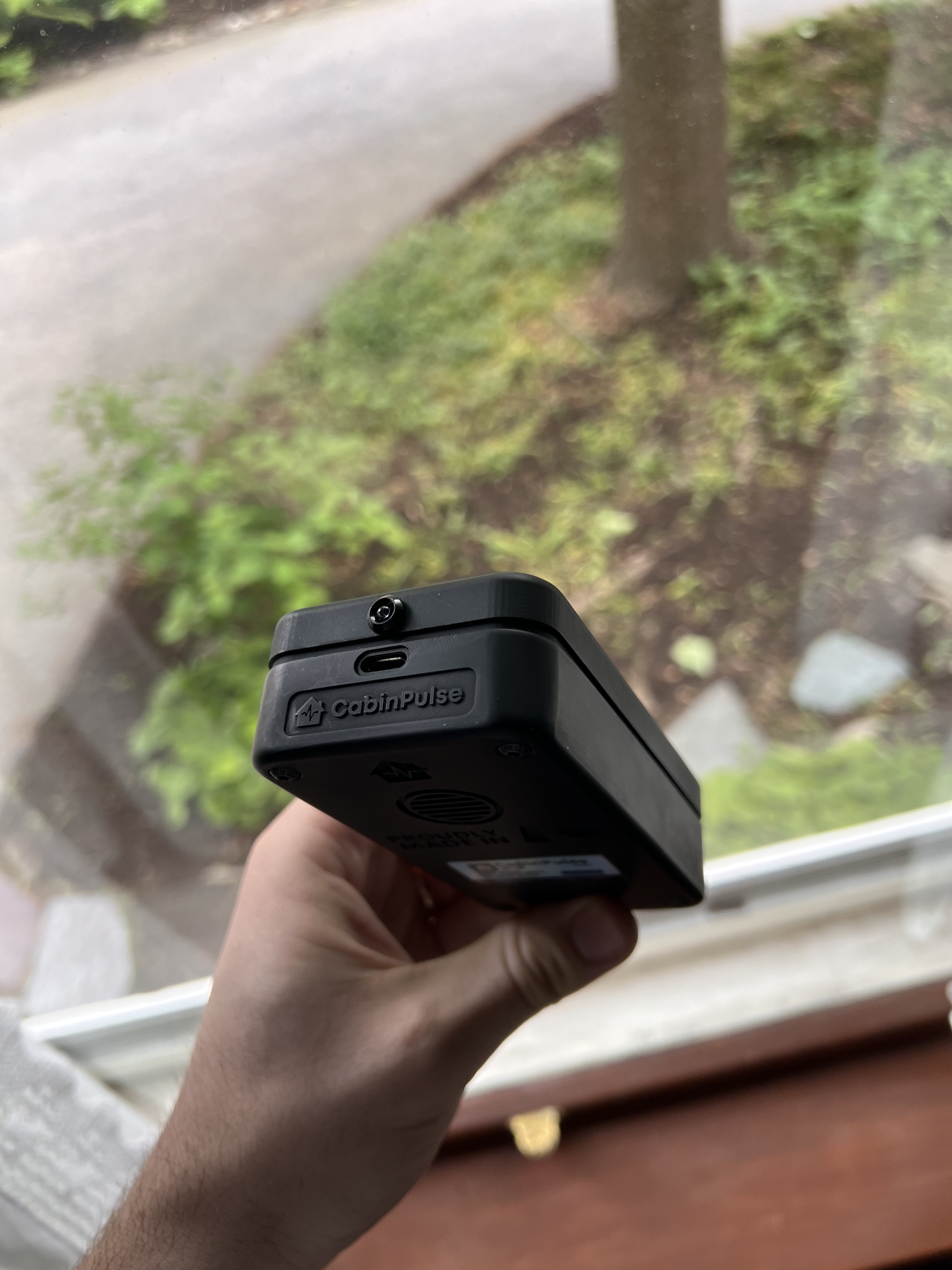
A plug-in cellular freeze alarm with temperature, humidity and power-loss sensors.

Category	Communication method	Typical use
Telephone dialer	PSTN or VoIP land-line; dials pre-programmed numbers with a recorded message. Classic example: Control Products “FreezeAlarm” series (Basic, Intermediate, Deluxe).	Homes with an existing land-line.
Internet (Wi-Fi/Ethernet)	Sends e-mail/SMS via cloud server; view data through app or web dashboard. Example: Temperature@lert WiFi350 sensor.	Properties with reliable broadband.
Cellular	Built-in GSM/LTE modem sends SMS, voice call or push alert; often includes battery backup. Example devices include CabinPulse all-in-one multi-sensor units designed for remote cabins.	Remote cabins, RVs, greenhouses lacking land-line or Wi-Fi.
Local indicator	Beacon or audible alarm only (no remote communication). Example: Lumastrobe “Freeze Flash”.	Locations with neighbours able to observe the signal.

Many smart-home ecosystems offer battery-powered freeze sensors that report to a central hub; if temperature falls below 41–45 °F (5–7 °C), the hub notifies occupants or a monitoring centre.

== Commercial availability ==
The first telephone freeze alarms reached the consumer market in the late 1980s, notably the Sensaphone 400 (also marketed as “CottageSitter”). During the 2010s, internet-connected monitors such as the Temperature@lert WiFi350 and the Elertus Smart Sensor popularised cloud dashboards. Cellular multi-sensor units now dominate the remote-property segment because they remain operational through power and internet outages, albeit with a required data subscription. Entry-level local indicators cost under US$100, whereas cellular systems with cloud services typically retail for US$150–300 plus monthly fees.

== See also ==
- Cold chain, supply chain that uses refrigeration of temperature-sensitive goods
- Environmental monitoring
- Ice detector, instrument detecting presence of ice on a surface
- Smart home
