= Aerospace General Mini-Copter =

Mini-Copter

General information
- Type: Ultra-light helicopter / autogyro
- National origin: United States
- Manufacturer: Aerospace General
- Number built: 3

History
- First flight: 1973

The Aerospace General Mini-Copter was a miniature helicopter designed to be air-dropped to U.S. military pilots stranded behind enemy lines or in otherwise inaccessible areas.

At its most basic, the Mini-Copter was simply made up of fuel tanks and a rotor unit strapped to the pilot. A slightly more conventional configuration was also developed, with these units attached to a steel framework that also provided a seat for the pilot. In both these versions, power was provided by rocket motors on the rotor tips.

A third variation added a piston engine and pusher propeller to the design, allowing it to fly as an autogyro without the tip rockets once sufficient forward speed had been achieved.

Design work started in 1972, with first flight on 31 March 1973. The three prototype vehicles were tested by the US Navy from late 1974 to 1977, then transferred to the US Army in 1978 for testing under a $409,000 program named "Individual Tactical Air Vehicle".

== Specifications ==
Data from Jane's All the World's Aircraft 1976–77

General characteristics

- Crew: 1
- Length: 8 ft 0 in (2.44 m) (overall)
- Height: 7 ft 0 in (2.13 m)
- Empty weight: 275 lb (125 kg)
- Max takeoff weight: 650 lb (295 kg)
- Fuel capacity:
  - 4 US gal (3.3 imp gal; 15 L) rocket fuel
  - 20 US gal (17 imp gal; 76 L) gasoline
- Powerplant: 2 × Aerospace General hydrogen peroxide rockets, 42 lbf (0.19 kN) thrust each
- Powerplant: 1 × McCulloch flat-four engine, 90 hp (67 kW)
- Main rotor diameter: × 18 ft 0 in (5.49 m)
- Main rotor area: 254 sq ft (23.6 m^{2})
- Propellers: 2-bladed wooden fixed-pitch, 4 ft 4 in (1.32 m) diameter

Performance

- Maximum speed: 140 mph (230 km/h, 120 kn) (rockets + piston engine)
- Cruise speed: 85 mph (137 km/h, 74 kn) (piston engine only)
- Range: 250 mi (400 km, 220 nmi)
- Service ceiling: 18,000 ft (5,500 m) (rockets + piston engine)
- Rate of climb: 2,500 ft/min (13 m/s) (at least) (rockers + piston engine)
