= Agence Nationale de l'Aviation Civile du Togo =

Civil aviation authority in Togo

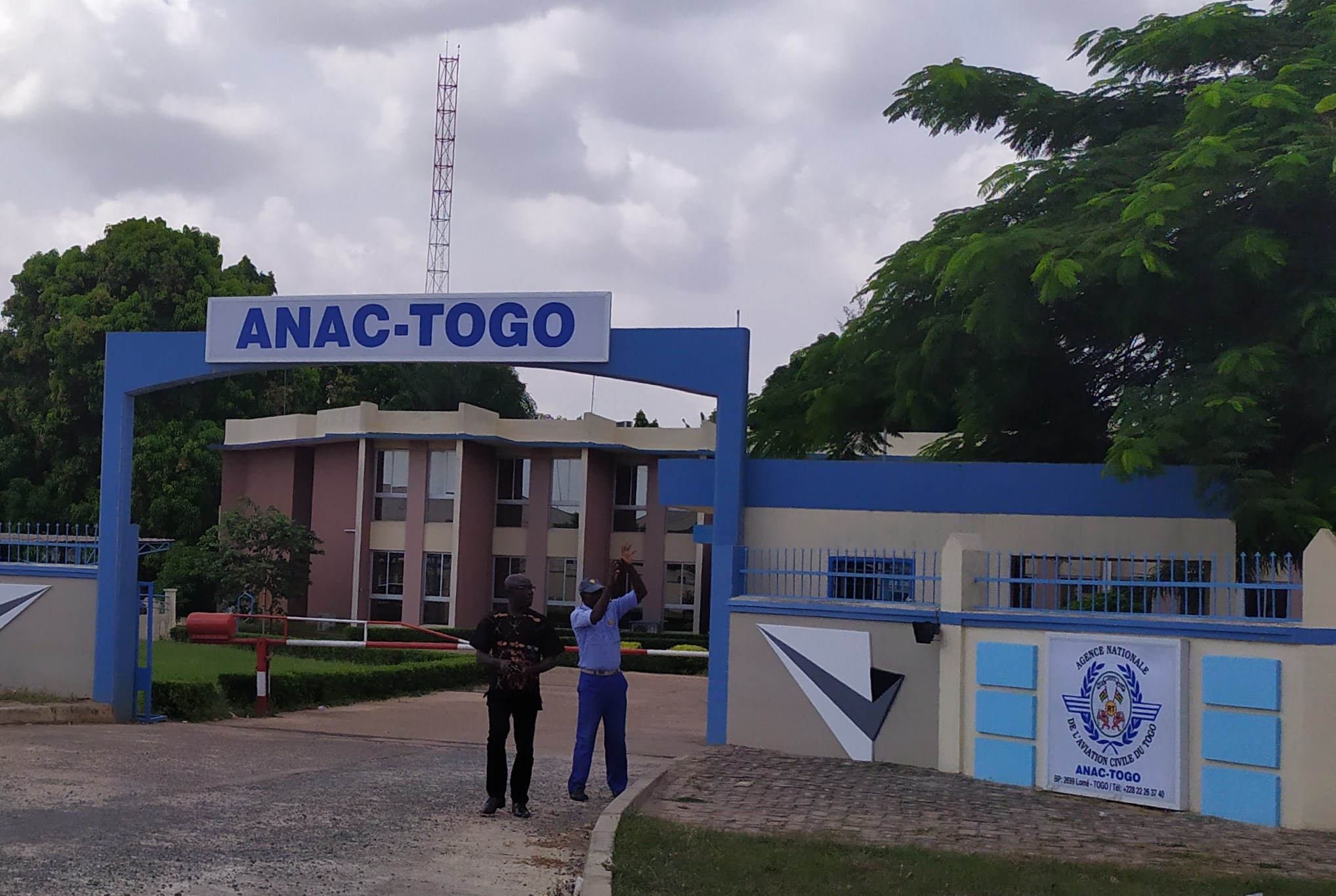
Office of ANAC Togo in Lomé

The Agence Nationale de l'Aviation Civile du Togo (ANAC-Togo, in English the National Agency of Civil Aviation of Togo) is the civil aviation authority of Togo. Its head office is in Lomé. The agency is under the supervision of the Minister of Civil Aviation but has managerial and financial autonomy.

The Direction de l’Aviation Civile (DAC), in English the Directorate of Civil Aviation, ANAC-Togo′s predecessor agency, was established by decree N° 73/12 of 17 January 1973. It was under the Ministry of Public Works, Mining, Transport, Posts, and Telecommunications. The current ANAC-Togo was established by law n°2007-007 of 22 January 2007.
