= Beets Special =

GB-1 Special

General information
- Type: Recreational aircraft
- Designer: Glen Beets
- Number built: 1

History
- First flight: 25 July 1973

The Beets Special was a single-seat recreational aircraft built in the United States in the mid-1970s with the intention of marketing it for homebuilding. It was a parasol-wing monoplane of conventional configuration with fixed tailwheel undercarriage.

The single prototype (registration N711GB) was constructed by Glen Beets who was working as a welder for Lou Stolp at the time. He based his general design on the Stolp Starduster biplane, which was being offered to the homebuilt aircraft market at the time. Plans for the Beets Special were marketed by Stolp's company at one time.

== Specifications ==
Data from Jane's All the World's Aircraft 1975–76

General characteristics

- Crew: one pilot
- Length: 16 ft 4 in (4.98 m)
- Wingspan: 25 ft 0 in (7.62 m)
- Height: 6 ft 0 in (1.83 m)
- Airfoil: Clark 72
- Empty weight: 625 lb (283 kg)
- Max takeoff weight: 925 lb (420 kg)
- Powerplant: 1 × Volkswagen air-cooled engine , 70 hp (52 kW)

Performance

- Maximum speed: 156 mph (251 km/h, 136 kn) at sea level
- Cruise speed: 120 mph (190 km/h, 100 kn)
- Range: 600 mi (970 km, 520 nmi)
- Rate of climb: 1,000 ft/min (5.1 m/s)
