= Ice detector =

Instrument measuring presence of ice on a surface

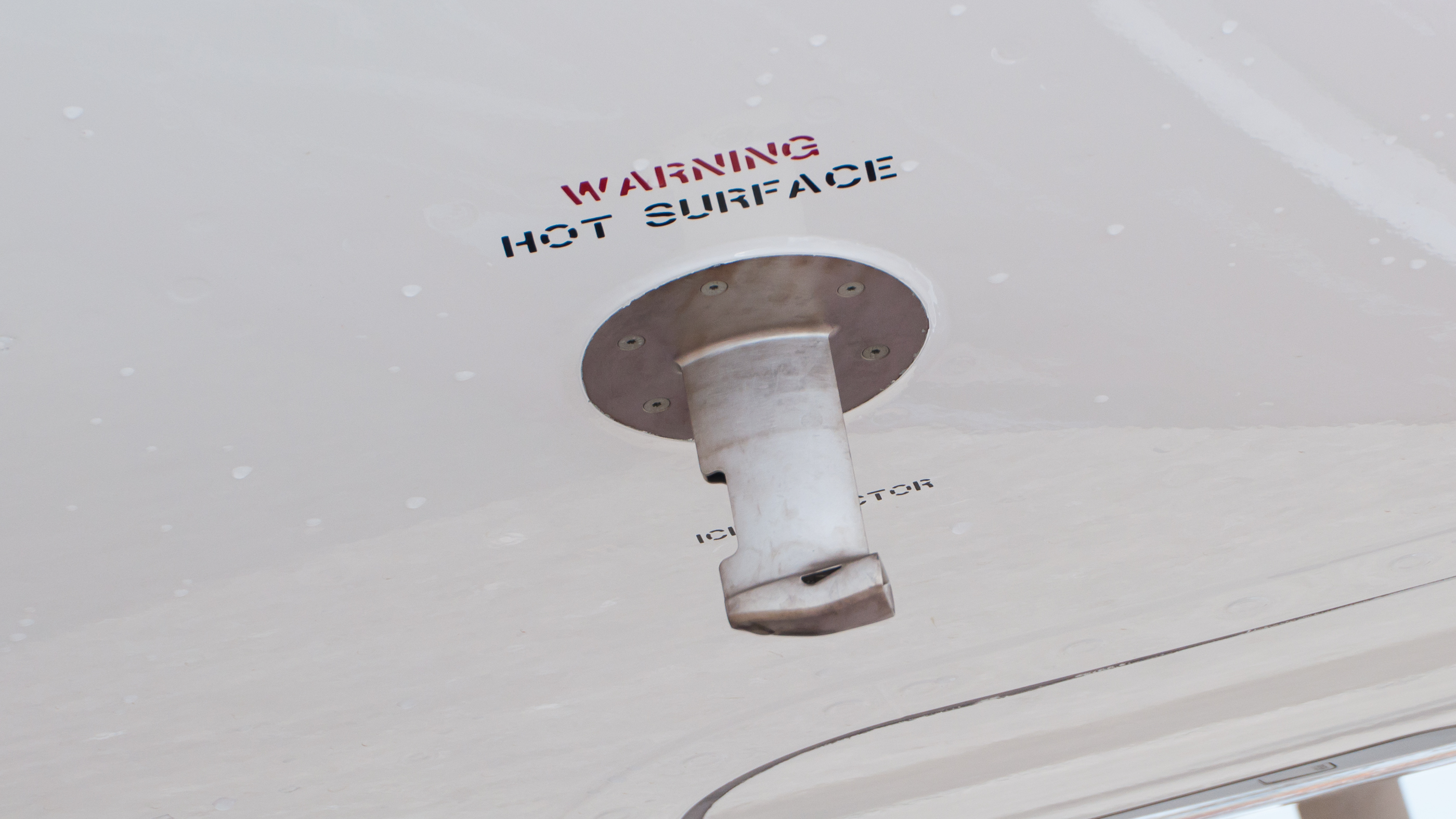
Right ice detector on a Boeing 787 Dreamliner

An ice detector is an instrument that detects the presence of ice on a surface. Ice detectors are used to identify the presence of icing conditions and are commonly used in aviation, unmanned aircraft, marine vessels, wind energy, and power lines.

Ice detection can be done with direct and indirect methods. Direct methods identify the presence of atmospheric icing conditions, i.e. the presence of supercooled water droplets. Indirect methods infer the presence of icing conditions by either detecting ice accretions on a surface, or by changed vehicle performance behavior.

== See also ==
- Freeze alarm, device that warns of temperatures below a defined threshold
