= Mylius Aircraft =

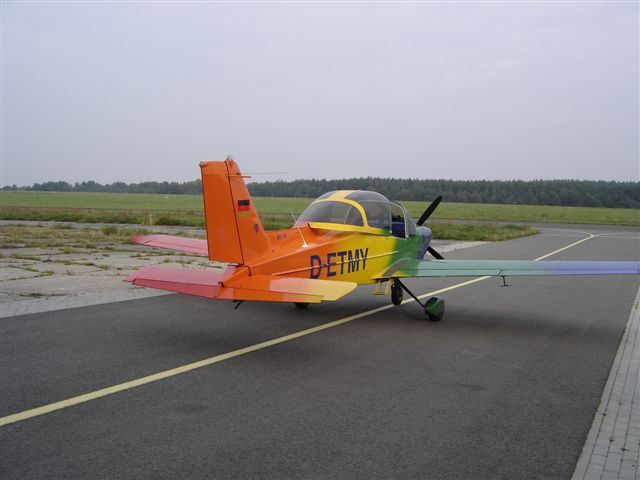
Prototype of the MY-103 in Usedom, Germany, September 2006

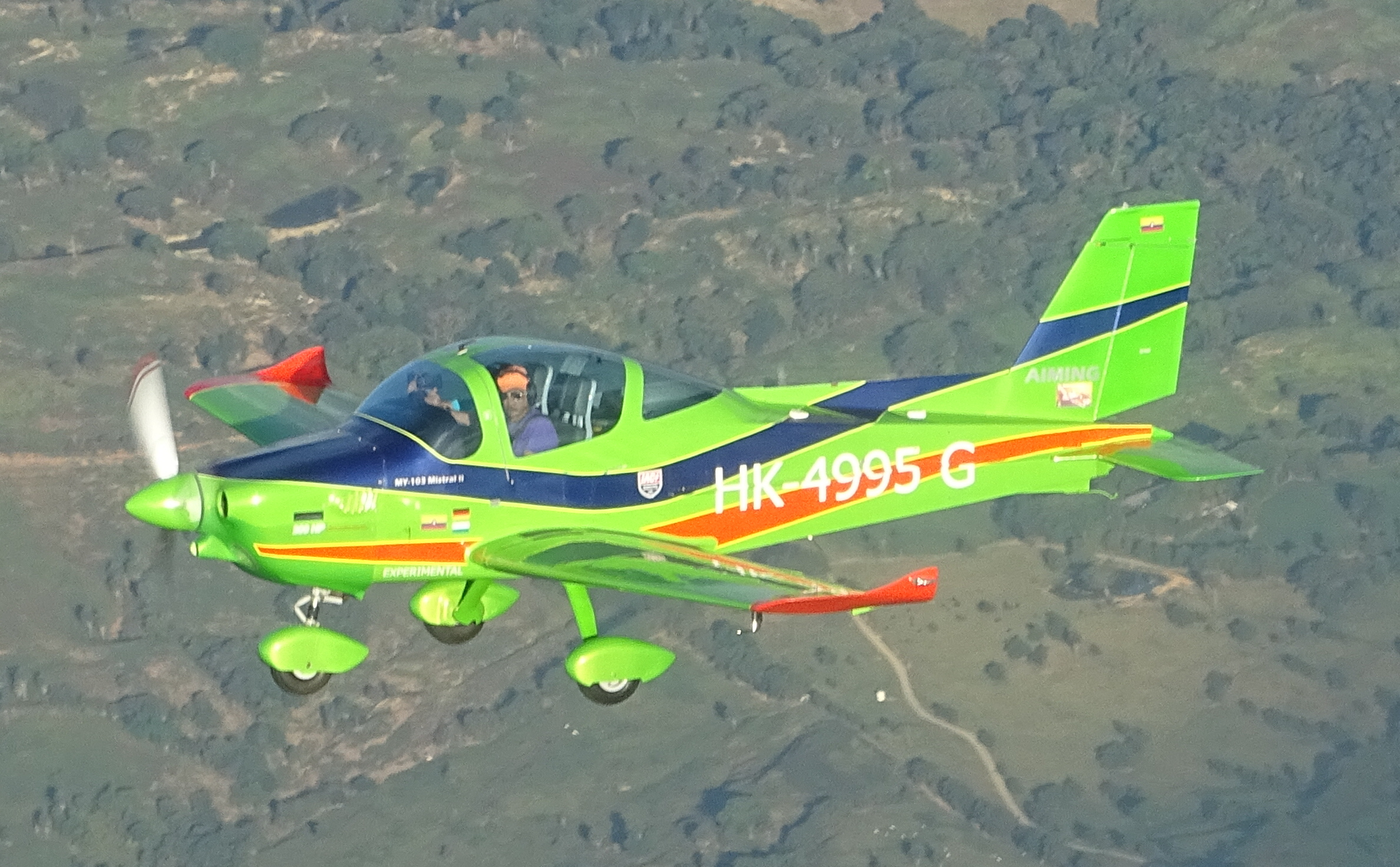
MY-103 Mistral over the Colombian Andes during flight testing in 2016

The Mylius family of aircraft were derived from the barn-built MHK-101 design, which later was adopted by MBB and became the Bölkow Bo 209 Monsun project. The Bo-209 was a full metal, low wing basic trainer with standard aerobatic capabilities (+6/-3.5 g), 150 hp O-320 or 160 hp IO-320 engine. The front wheel was retractable (fixed as an option). Both wings were foldable, thus permitting to trailer the aircraft by a car on its own main wheels, nose wheel retracted and tail forward.

The program became very successful. The Bo-209, mainly through its docile and responsive flight characteristics, was very popular among flight instructors all over the world. There is a faithful fan community of Bo-209 owners all over Europe, and used aircraft prices are still comparatively high. The program was abruptly terminated in 1972 with 100 aircraft built and more than 200 still in the open order books. But at that time, MBB had very profitable military orders and had no interest in continuing to build light aircraft.

With the experiences of the MBB Bo-209, the chief designer Hermann Mylius developed at his home an aerobatic trainer, the Mylius My 102 Tornado, a single seat, 200 hp AEIO 360 engine, Christen inverted flight oil supply +- 8g load. This aircraft was built in two versions, The previous one, built in 1973, is ready to fly, and the other one, built in 1984, had a shock loading and is waiting for repair.

With the same wing, empennage, engine and landing gear, he built a two-seat trainer in the late eighties. The difference between the Bo-209 and the first My-103 is mainly the dimensions, because the Monsun was not roomy enough to be comfortable for longer training sessions. This aircraft was finished by his son, Albert Mylius and some colleagues in the late nineties. Airborne in 1998, it was a proof of concept plane and could not be certified. The seats were located on top of the wing box. In order to let it meet the actual crash deceleration requirements, the buildup of the deformation zone under the seats would have gotten too high. Though it had a considerably wider elbow room than the Bo-209, more comfort was desired. So the cockpit area was redesigned, the seats moved in front of the wingbow, and it got another 2 inches wider. First flight of My-102 v. 2 was in July 2001. 5 were built; certification was to 95% completed, when the banks forced the company into bankruptcy. Contrary to standard rules in Germany, which do not permit pilot’s education in an aircraft with only preliminary certification, the My-103 was permitted to be used in flight schools. Currently, two samples of the MY-103 "Mistral" are flying in Germany, registered as D-ETMY and D-ENMY.

There is a new development of the MY-103: an updated version with new avionics being developed by Aero Integration & Manufacturing (AIMING). This company launched the program in July 2013 with the introduction of the new version. First aircraft, bearing the original Mylius construction number S002 and Colombian registration HK-4995G is being flight tested in Colombia, having flown for the first time on July 16, 2014.

== Aircraft ==
- Mylius My-102 Tornado
- Mylius My-103 Mistral
- Mylius My-104
