= Mylius My 102 Tornado =

German aerobatic aircraft

My 102 Tornado
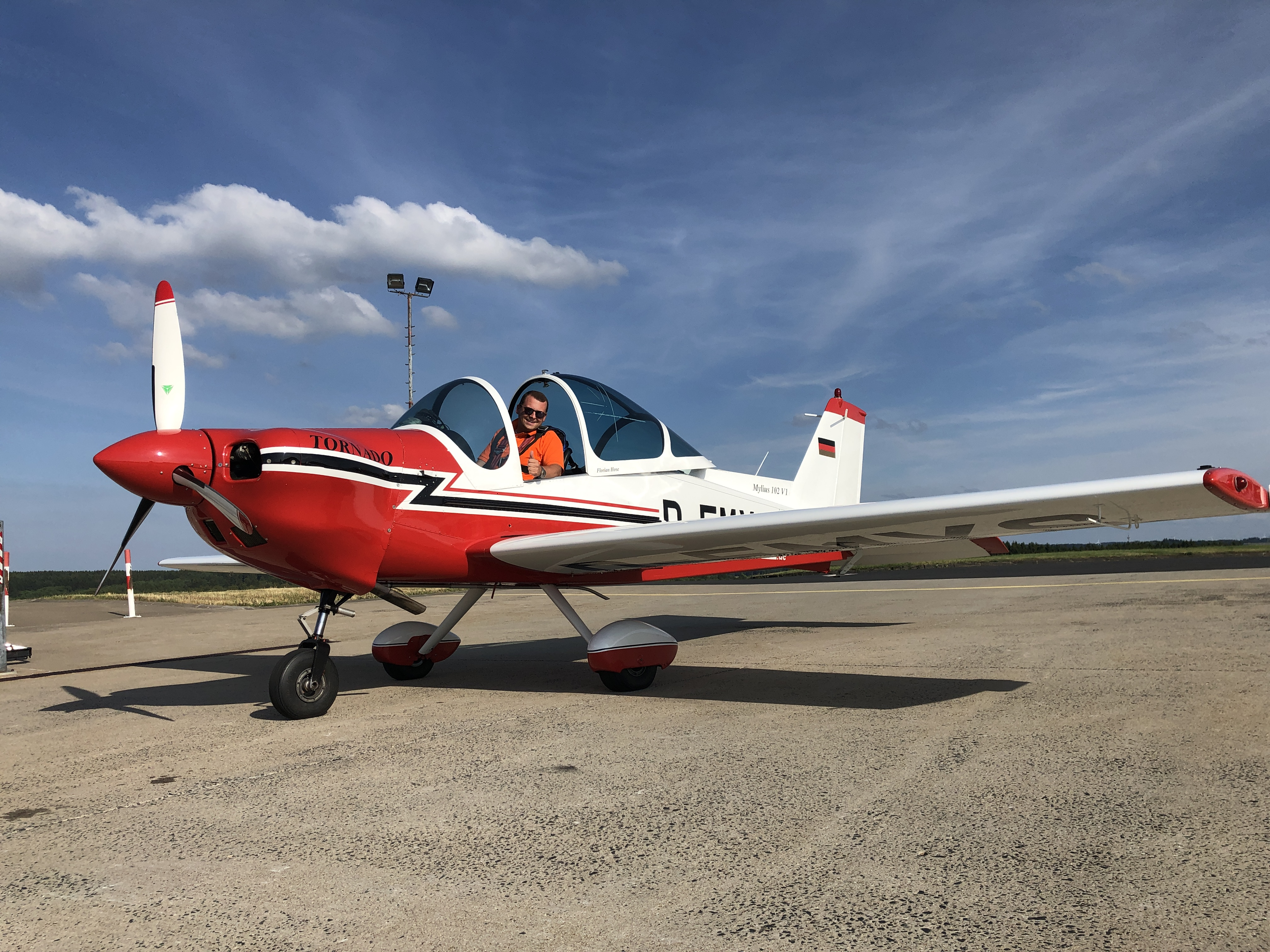
- The first prototype

General information
- Type: Sporting and aerobatic aircraft
- National origin: Germany
- Number built: 2

History
- First flight: 7 July 1973

The Mylius My 102 Tornado is a prototype single-seat German aerobatic aircraft. It was designed as a smaller derivative of the MBB Bo 209, but was not placed in production, with only two aircraft built.

== Design and development ==
The German light aircraft manufacturer Bölkow's technical director Dr Hermann Mylius, together with two other engineers from the company, designed the two-seat MHK-101 in their spare time, with the design being adopted by Bölkow as the Bo 209, entering production in 1970. As a follow-on to the Bo-209, Mylius began design work in July 1971 on a smaller, single-seat derivative of the Bo-209, intended as an aerobatic aircraft, the Mylius My 102 Tornado. The My 102 was considered for production by Messerschmitt-Bölkow-Blohm (MBB), the former Bölkow, as the Bo 210 Tornado, (Note: The 1971 edition of Jane's All the World's Aircraft described the proposed Bo 210 as a two seat aircraft with fully retractable landing gear, and also mentioned a four-seat Bo 211 Taifun based on the Bo 210.) but instead, MBB abandoned production of light aircraft in order to concentrate on the Bo 105 helicopter.

The My 102 is a low-wing cantilever monoplane of all-metal construction, powered by a 200 hp (150 kW) Lycoming AIO-360-B1B flat-four piston engine driving a three-bladed propeller. It has a tricycle undercarriage with fixed mainwheels and a nosewheel which was retractable in the prototype with a plan to offer a fixed nosewheel as an option. The pilot sits in an enclosed cockpit, with a rearward sliding canopy. The aircraft's wings can be folded to minimise hangar space needed to store the aircraft or for towing on roads.

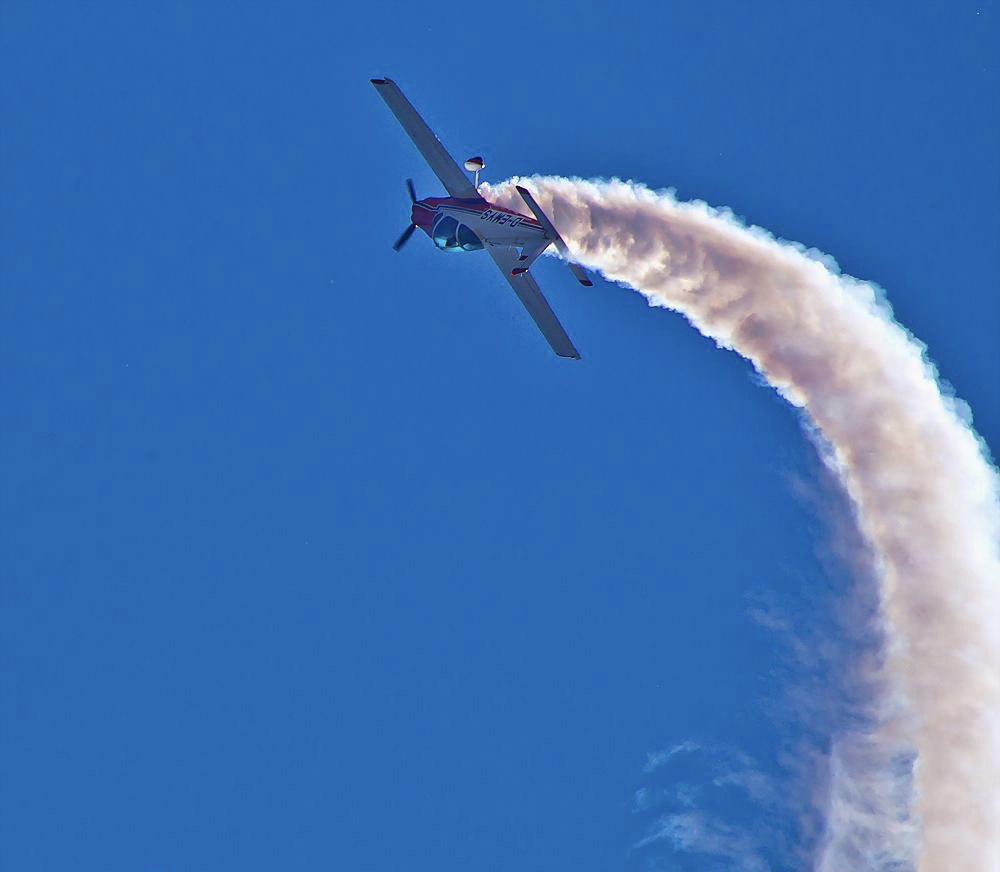
D-EMYS in flight

Work began on construction of a prototype in December 1971, and it first flew, with the registration D-EMYS, on 7 July 1973 at Neubiberg. It was successful in aerobatic competitions, taking part in the 1973 German Aerobatic Championships and the 1974 Biancotto Trophy. By 1980, a second prototype was under construction, with changes including a more powerful (225 hp (168 kW)) engine, revised wings with reduced span (7.89 m (25 ft 11 in)) and wing area (9.40 m^{2} (101.2 sq ft)). Two derivatives of the My 102 were noted as being under development in the 1980 Jane's All the World's Aircraft, the two-seat My 103 Mistral (eventually to fly in 1998) and the four-seat My 104 Passat.

The second prototype, registration D-EMYM, flew for the first time on 3 April 1984. The Tornado (now styled MY-102) was being proposed for production by Mylius Flugzeugwerk of Bitburg in 1999, and was claimed to conform to European Joint Aviation Authorities airworthiness standards. Mylius was concentrating on the MY-103 by 2003, however.

== Specifications (First prototype) ==
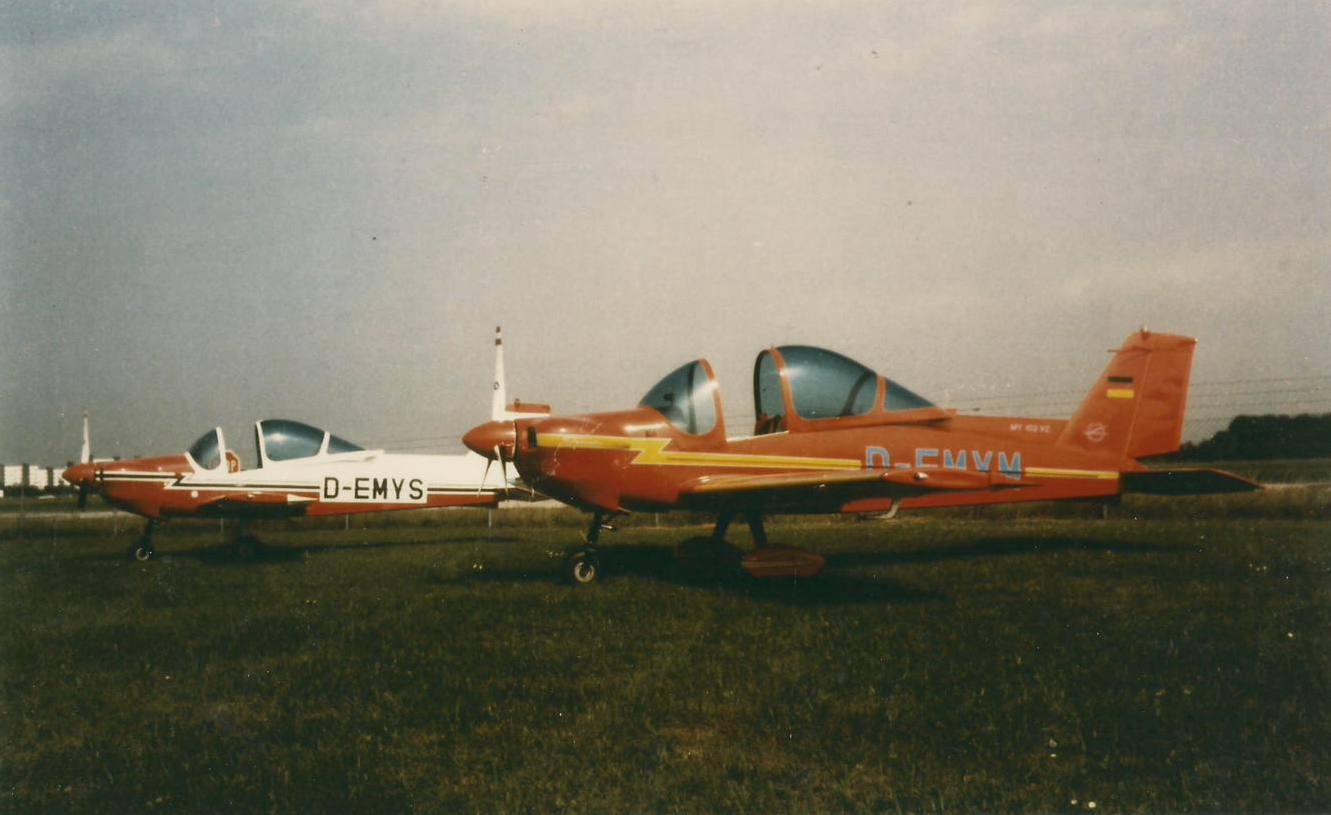
Both My 102s, with the second prototype closer to the camera

Data from Jane's All the World's Aircraft 1975–76

General characteristics

- Crew: 1
- Length: 6.40 m (21 ft 0 in)
- Wingspan: 8.10 m (26 ft 7 in)
- Height: 2.31 m (7 ft 7 in)
- Wing area: 9.80 m^{2} (105.5 sq ft)
- Aspect ratio: 6.7:1
- Airfoil: NACA 64215 at root, NACA 64212 at tip
- Empty weight: 530 kg (1,168 lb)
- Max takeoff weight: 820 kg (1,808 lb)
- Fuel capacity: 146.8 L (38.8 US gal; 32.3 imp gal)
- Powerplant: 1 × Lycoming AIO-360-B1B air-cooled flat-four engine, 150 kW (200 hp)
- Propellers: 3-bladed Hoffmann HO-V 123/180R metal constant-speed propeller, 1.80 m (5 ft 11 in) diameter

Performance

- Maximum speed: 322 km/h (200 mph, 174 kn)
- Cruise speed: 296 km/h (184 mph, 160 kn)
- Stall speed: 97 km/h (60 mph, 52 kn) (flaps down)
- Never exceed speed: 396 km/h (246 mph, 214 kn)
- Range: 960 km (600 mi, 520 nmi)
- Service ceiling: 9,100 m (30,000 ft)
- Rate of climb: 12 m/s (2,400 ft/min)
