= Aeroflot Flight 141 =

1973 aviation accident

Coordinates: 50°7′4″N 14°16′44″E

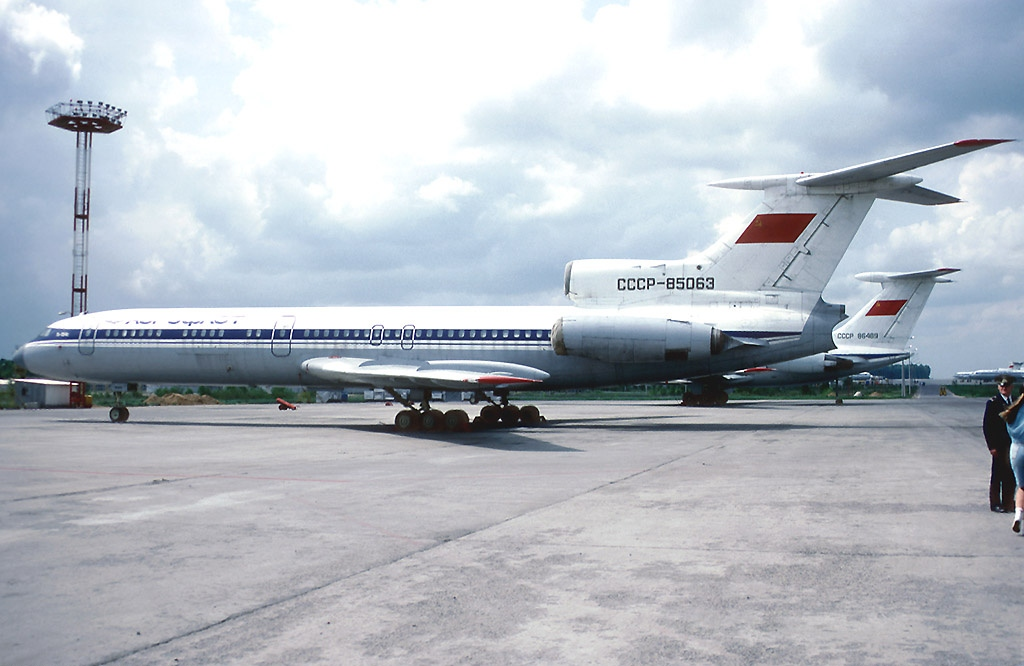
- An Aeroflot Tu-154 similar to the aircraft involved

Accident
- Date: 19 February 1973
- Summary: Undetermined, crew error
- Site: 0.46 km from Prague Ruzyně Airport

Aircraft
- Aircraft type: Tupolev Tu-154
- Operator: Aeroflot
- Registration: CCCP-85023
- Flight origin: Sheremetyevo Airport, Moscow, USSR
- Destination: Prague Ruzyně Airport, Prague, Czechoslovakia
- Occupants: 100
- Passengers: 87
- Crew: 13
- Fatalities: 66
- Survivors: 34

Aeroflot Flight 141 was an international passenger flight from Sheremetyevo Airport in Moscow, Soviet Union, to Prague Ruzyně Airport in Prague, Czechoslovakia. On 19 February 1973, the Tupolev Tu-154 flying this route crashed approximately 1.5 kilometers (0.93 miles; 0.81 nautical miles) short of runway 25 (now runway 24) at Prague Ruzyně Airport. While most passengers initially survived the impact, many perished in the subsequent fire. Of the 87 passengers and 13 crew members on board, 62 passengers and 4 crew members were killed.

== Aircraft ==
The aircraft involved was a Tupolev Tu-154, registered CCCP-85023. It was manufactured by the Kuibyshev Aviation Plant in September 1972 and delivered to the Ministry of Civil Aviation of the USSR (operating under the Aeroflot brand) on 6 October 1972.

It was operated by the 207th Flying Squadron, part of the Sheremetyevo Joint Air Squadron of the Central Directorate of International Air Communications (TsUMVS). For a brief period, minor comments were noted regarding the operation of certain equipment and systems; however, these issues were minor and were promptly resolved. Overall, the aircraft was considered to be in sound technical condition. At the time of the accident, the aircraft had completed 261 takeoff and landing cycles and had logged 459.1 flight hours, including 4.1 hours since its last maintenance check.

== Crew ==
The flight was operated by an experienced crew, consisting of the following members:

- Captain (Pilot-in-Command): 41-year-old Sergei F. Chernetsov, a first-class pilot with over 12,650 flight hours, including 236 hours on the Tu-154 (48 of them at night). He had been on duty the previous day and had 7 hours and 45 minutes of rest before the flight.
- Co-pilot: 44-year-old Vladimir P. Beresnev, a second-class pilot with over 14,650 flight hours, including 247 hours on the Tu-154 (53 of them at night). He had been on duty the day before and had 9 hours of rest prior to the flight.
- Navigator: 47-year-old Vadim Ye. Yurchenko, a first-class navigator with over 4,630 flight hours, including 124 hours on the Tu-154 (25 at night). He had also been on duty the previous day and had 9 hours of rest before the flight.
- Flight Engineer: 34-year-old Valery M. Shchegolev, a first-class flight engineer with over 3,710 flight hours, including 957 hours on the Tu-154 (323 at night). He had 8 hours of rest prior to the flight after being on duty the previous day.
- Navigator (Inspector): 35-year-old Lev B. Uspensky, a first-class navigator and senior navigator of the aviation squadron. He had logged over 7,280 flight hours, including more than 310 on the Tu-154 (60 at night). The day before the accident, he had flown from Rome to Moscow, a 6-hour and 35-minute flight that arrived at 16:40. He then had 10 hours and 40 minutes of rest.
- Flight Engineer (Instructor): 47-year-old Igor I. Motasov, a first-class flight engineer with 9,515 flight hours, including 674 hours on the Tu-154 (230 at night). He also flew from Rome the previous day (6 hours and 35 minutes, arriving at 16:40) and had 8 hours of rest afterward.
- Flight Radio Operator (Instructor): 44-year-old Daniil I. Zyazin, a first-class flight radio operator with 9,987 flight hours, including 602 on the Tu-154 (156 at night). He had been on duty the previous day and had 8 hours of rest before the flight.
- Trainee Radio Operator: 42-year-old Andrei V. Zhukov, a first-class flight radio operator with over 10,460 flight hours, though only 2 of those were on the Tu-154. He had been on duty the day before and also had 8 hours of rest.

According to available data, all eight crew members held the required qualifications and valid certifications. There were no records of previous accidents attributable to their actions.

== Chronology ==
=== Flight to Prague ===
The Tupolev Tu-154 (registration CCCP-85023) was operating Aeroflot Flight 141 on the Moscow–Prague route. At 06:50 Coordinated Universal Time (UTC) (09:50 Moscow Standard Time [MSK]) on 19 February 1973, the aircraft departed from Sheremetyevo Airport.

On board were 87 passengers (85 adults, one 12-year-old child, and one infant), 13 crew members, 1,549 kilograms (3,415 pounds) of luggage, 2,223 kilograms (4,901 pounds) of cargo, and 410 kilograms (900 pounds) of mail. The fuel load at departure was approximately 27,000 kilograms (60,000 pounds), resulting in an estimated takeoff weight of 86,316 kilograms (190,294 pounds), well below the maximum allowable takeoff weight of 90,000 kilograms (200,000 pounds). The aircraft's center of gravity (CG) was within the acceptable range for the Tu-154, fluctuating between 19.3% and 22.0% of the mean aerodynamic chord (MAC), within the allowable limits of 16.5% to 28.0% MAC.

The flight proceeded over Soviet territory at flight level (FL) 330 (approximately 10,000 meters or 33,000 feet). Upon entering Polish airspace, the aircraft climbed to FL350 (about 11,000 meters or 35,000 feet). After passing Warsaw, air traffic control (ATC) instructed the crew to descend to FL310 (about 9,400 meters or 31,000 feet), and later, upon approaching Czechoslovakia, to FL290 (about 8,800 meters or 29,000 feet).

The aircraft crossed the Polish–Czechoslovak border at FL220 (approximately 6,700 meters or 22,000 feet). At 08:54 UTC, the crew reported passing Frýdlant (OKX) and descending from 7,200 to 6,700 meters (23,600 to 22,000 feet). Prague ATC instructed the crew to continue descending to 2,440 meters (8,010 feet) toward Roudnice (RCE), and at 08:56 UTC, to maintain course along the centerline of the air corridor.

At 09:00 UTC, the crew reported passing over the Roudnice VOR at 2,440 meters (8,010 feet) and was instructed to switch communication to the approach controller on 121.4 MHz, which is also designated as the international emergency frequency used for distress communications.

=== Landing approach ===
At the time of the approach, an anti-cyclone was present over Czechoslovakia, accompanied by occasional light snowfall. Overall, weather conditions were relatively favorable, with no reports of turbulence or icing.

After the crew switched communications to Prague Approach, they were instructed to follow the Early Handover (EHO) procedure until capturing the approach radio beacon, and then to descend to 1,200 meters (3,900 feet). At 09:02 UTC, the crew reported passing 1,500 meters (4,900 feet) on a heading of 135°, at which point they were instructed to switch to Prague Circle control.

Upon transitioning to the new frequency, the radar controller instructed Flight 141 to continue following the approach radio beacon. The crew was informed that they were first in line to land using the Instrument Landing System (ILS) for runway 25 (now runway 24), and they were cleared to descend to 500 meters (1,600 feet) based on the airfield pressure setting of 730.1 mmHg (97.34 kPa).

At 09:04 UTC, the crew received clearance to descend further to 350 meters (1,150 feet) above airfield level and were advised that the aircraft may have deviated slightly—by a couple of kilometers—from the intended approach path. Forty seconds later, ATC informed the crew that the aircraft was 15 kilometers (9.3 miles; 8.1 nautical miles) from the airport and was correctly aligned with the landing course. At 09:05 UTC, the crew was instructed to switch communications to the Prague Tower (referred to in records as the landing dispatcher).

=== Catastrophe ===
Approximately 7 kilometers (4.3 miles; 3.8 nautical miles) from the airport, the crew of Flight 141 established communication with Prague Tower and reported their approach with the intention to land, noting visual contact with the runway. The controller cleared the aircraft to land on runway 25 and reported surface winds from 250° at 4 m/s (7.8 kn; 14 km/h; 8.9 mph).

At 09:06 UTC, the crew requested and received information about the braking coefficient, which was reported as 5, along with clearance for a possible go-around. At 09:06:30 UTC, the crew acknowledged the transmission—this was the last known communication from Flight 141.

The aircraft was aligned with the glide path and flying normally when, over the Liboc (L) outer marker, it abruptly pitched nose-down at an angle of 4.62°, resulting in a sudden and rapid descent. The cause of this unexpected maneuver remains unclear. In response, the crew increased engine power and pulled back on the controls in an attempt to raise the nose and arrest the descent. However, these corrective actions had minimal effect.

The aircraft narrowly cleared the R7 expressway, but approximately 60 meters (200 feet) beyond it and 467 meters (1,532 feet) short of runway 25, the aircraft—with a slight right bank—struck the frozen ground with its right main landing gear. The impact was severe, causing the gear to collapse. The airliner continued forward and crashed fully into the ground 320 meters (1,050 feet) short of the runway threshold.

Debris from the aircraft was scattered across the area, and at approximately 257 meters (843 feet) from the runway end, ruptured fuel tanks released jet fuel, which immediately ignited. A fire rapidly spread through the wreckage. The aircraft ultimately came to rest 50 meters (160 feet) short of the runway and 75 meters (246 feet) to the right of the extended runway centerline. The fire quickly engulfed and completely destroyed the airframe.

According to the airport's meteorological service, at the time of the accident there was light snowfall, with partly cloudy skies and a cloud base at 1,200 meters (3,900 feet), with gaps up to 2,400 meters (7,900 feet). Wind was reported from 260° at 6–8 m/s (12–16 kn; 22–29 km/h; 13–18 mph), occasionally increasing to 11 m/s (21 kn; 40 km/h; 25 mph). The temperature was 0 °C (32 °F), and visibility was approximately 5 kilometers (3.1 miles; 2.7 nautical miles).

=== Rescue work ===
The disaster occurred at 09:07 UTC (10:07 local time), immediately prompting an alarm from the airport fire service. Shortly thereafter, the landing controller also issued an emergency alarm. Firefighting vehicles, stationed approximately 1.5 kilometers (0.93 miles) from the crash site, took 90 seconds to reach the scene, arriving at 09:09 UTC. By that time, the fire had already engulfed the rear section of the fuselage and the center wing area. Windows at the rear of the cabin began to shatter due to the intense heat.

Firefighters focused their rescue efforts on the forward section of the cabin, where survivors were most likely to be found. Within the first three to four minutes, 34 people were successfully rescued. However, by 09:14 UTC, the fire had spread to the left side of the aircraft and engulfed the entire cabin. Compressed air cylinders in the forward section began to explode, making further rescue operations impossible.

At 09:17 UTC, city fire brigades were called in to assist with extinguishing the fire. By 09:20 UTC, the fire had been largely subdued, though flames persisted in the cabin, fueled by jet fuel leaking from ruptured tanks. The fire was finally brought under full control by 09:45 UTC.

As a result of the disaster, 62 passengers and 4 flight attendants lost their lives. Of the 66 fatalities, 53 bodies were found inside the aircraft and 13 outside. According to the autopsy reports, 51 victims died from burns and 15 from multiple traumatic injuries. Of the survivors, 15 passengers and 3 crew members sustained injuries, while the remaining 16 occupants escaped with minor or no injuries.

The crash of Flight 141 was the first accident involving the Tupolev Tu-154, and the first to result in fatalities. At the time, it was also the second-deadliest aviation disaster in Czechoslovakia, surpassed only by the crash of TABSO Flight 101, which claimed 82 lives.

== Passengers ==
Fatal Injuries through nationality
Nationality	Fatal Injuries
USSR	37
Czechoslovakia	17
Cuba	5
Poland	1
Romania	1
German Democratic Republic	1
Total	62

== Investigation ==
=== Conclusions of the Czechoslovak Commission ===
After analyzing the circumstances of the crash, the Czechoslovak investigation commission reached the following conclusions:

1. The pre-flight preparation of both the aircraft and crew was conducted in accordance with established regulations. The aircraft was technically sound, and the flight proceeded along the designated route and at assigned altitudes up to the Liboc (L) locator beacon. Throughout the flight, the crew did not report any problems or difficulties.
2. All crew members held the required licenses and qualifications, and their health was assessed as satisfactory.
3. The aircraft possessed a valid airworthiness certificate and was maintained in accordance with current instructions and manuals. No design modifications had been made during its service life, and all previously identified faults had been promptly rectified.
4. During both takeoff and landing, the aircraft's weight and balance remained within the permissible limits.
5. The fuel used met the appropriate standards and specifications.
6. No hazardous weather conditions were forecasted or reported to the crew during the flight or during the landing approach. The flight was conducted under visual meteorological conditions before landing. However, within the surface layer—up to 100 metres (330 ft) above ground level—the possibility of turbulence during the landing approach could not be ruled out.
7. All radio navigation equipment along the route and at the airport was functioning properly.
8. Radio communication between the aircraft and air traffic control was normal and uninterrupted.
9. There were no reported malfunctions in airport radio equipment during Flight 141's approach. The crew did not report any communication issues nor did they transmit squawk code 7600 (radio failure).
10. Both flight recorders were operational and were immediately recovered and sent for examination following the crash.
11. There was no structural failure of the aircraft prior to its collision with the ground. The wreckage was scattered no more than 320 metres (1,050 ft) from the end of the runway.
12. A fire ignited immediately after the right wing struck the ground, and it quickly spread. As the aircraft overturned, fuel spilled into the fuselage, intensifying the fire both inside and outside the cabin. Rescue and firefighting operations commenced within two minutes of the crash.
13. The airliner was completely destroyed in the crash.
14. The approach lighting system for Runway 25 sustained damage as a result of the accident.
15. A total of 66 people perished in the crash, while 18 people were seriously injured and 16 escaped with relatively minor or no injuries. With the exception of the four deceased flight attendants, a significant portion of the crew survived.
16. During rescue efforts, 34 occupants were successfully evacuated from the burning wreckage. According to testimonies from surviving passengers, the design of the seatbelt buckles significantly hindered rescue and evacuation efforts.

Due to the complete destruction of the aircraft upon impact and the subsequent fire, the Czechoslovak Ministry of Transport commission was unable to determine the exact cause of the accident. However, investigators considered the possibility that during the landing approach, the Tu-154 encountered unexpected turbulence and may have been affected by wind shear.

=== Conclusions of the Soviet Commission ===
The tail construction of the Tupolev Tu-154

The Soviet investigation criticized the 207th Flying Squadron, whose leadership had organized preparations for the flight with serious procedural violations. These included:

- The flight squadron commander, P. N. Karteriev, and the acting aviation squadron commander, K. F. Chanov, were replaced before the flight by the navigator and flight engineer. This substitution was made without justification and constituted a violation of Order No. 275-70 issued by the Ministry of Civil Aviation.
- The flight assignment included two inspectors and one trainee, in violation of paragraph 4.1.12 of the GA-71 Flight Operations Manual (NPP). This led to a situation in which multiple inspectors were present in the cockpit simultaneously, complicating internal crew coordination. As a result, the crew's operations were disrupted during a critical phase of flight—the landing approach.

Investigators identified pilot error by Captain Chernetsov as a likely cause of the crash. At low altitude, the captain erroneously shifted the stabilizer from the landing position to the flight position, deviating from the procedures outlined in the Flight Operations Manual. By failing to maintain the proper landing configuration, the commander created a time-constrained situation that contributed to further control errors and ultimately led to the accident.

The design of the stabilizer control switch was also criticized, as it allowed the stabilizer angle to change imperceptibly to the crew—from −5.5° (landing position) to 0° (flight position). In the landing configuration, the stabilizer provides a nose-up pitching moment to counteract the nose-down moment generated by the aircraft’s wing and landing configuration. When the stabilizer was shifted to the flight position, the compensating nose-up force was lost, allowing the nose-down moment to dominate and cause the aircraft to descend.

The crew's attempts to recover by pulling on the control yoke were ineffective due to the limited surface area of the elevators, which could not counteract the rapid nose-down pitch.

== Effects ==
During the investigation period, all Tu-154 aircraft were temporarily grounded. Shortly thereafter, several design modifications were implemented. These included improvements to the emergency exits, an increase in engine power, and changes to the flight control system.

As a result, the Kuibyshev Aviation Plant began producing an updated version of the aircraft, the Tu-154A, followed shortly by the Tu-154B model.

== See also ==
- Western Airlines Flight 2605
- Nigeria Airways Flight 2120
- Aeroflot Flight 1492
- Cathay Pacific Flight 780
