= List of Epsilon Pi Tau chapters =

Epsilon Pi Tau is an international honor society for students and professionals in the field of technology. It consists of both campus and field chapters.

== Collegiate chapters ==
In the following list of collegiate chapters, active chapters are indicated in bold and inactive chapters are in italics.

Chapter	Charter date and range	Institution	Location	Status	Ref.
Alpha	March 13, 1929 – 20xx ?	Ohio State University	Columbus, Ohio	Inactive	
Beta	January 29, 1930 – 20xx ?	Ball State University	Muncie, Indiana	Inactive	
Gamma	May 5, 1931	Miami University	Oxford, Ohio	Inactive	
Delta	May 25, 1931	Oregon State University	Corvallis, Oregon	Inactive	
Epsilon	June 25, 1932	Fitchburg State College	Fitchburg, Massachusetts	Inactive	
Zeta	August 20, 1932	Northern Illinois University	DeKalb, Illinois	Inactive	
Eta	December 9, 1932	Peru State College	Peru, Nebraska	Inactive	
Theta	May 27, 1933	University of Wisconsin–Stout	Menomonie, Wisconsin	Inactive	
Iota	May 25, 1933	Eastern Illinois University	Charleston, Illinois	Inactive	
Kappa	June 1, 1934	California State University, Chico	Chico, California	Inactive	
**Lambda**	April 28, 1934	Ohio University	Athens, Ohio	Active	
Mu	May 19, 1934	Indiana State University	Terre Haute, Indiana	Inactive	
Nu	April 20, 1935	Rutgers University–New Brunswick	New Brunswick and Piscataway, New Jersey	Inactive	
Xi		Carnegie Mellon University	Pittsburgh, Pennsylvania	Inactive	
Omicron	April 12, 1936	Montclair State University	Upper Montclair, New Jersey	Inactive	
Pi		University of Northern Iowa	Cedar Falls, Iowa	Inactive	
**Rho**	May 28, 1938	San Jose State University	San Jose, California	Active	
Sigma	June 4, 1938	Northern Arizona University	Flagstaff, Arizona	Inactive	
**Tau**	November 5, 1938	State University of New York, Buffalo	Buffalo, New York	Active	
Upsilon	May 25, 1940	West Virginia Institute of Technology	Montgomery, West Virginia	Inactive	
**Phi**	May 18, 1940	State University of New York at Oswego	Oswego, New York	Active	
Chi	May 17, 1941	Chicago State University	Chicago, Illinois	Inactive	
Psi	April 25, 1942	California University of Pennsylvania	California, Pennsylvania	Inactive	
**Omega**	May 10, 1948	Wayne State College	Wayne, Nebraska	Active	
Alpha Alpha	May 16, 1947	Pittsburg State University	Pittsburg, Kansas	Active	
Alpha Beta	December 19, 1947	University of California, Santa Barbara	Santa Barbara, California	Inactive	
**Alpha Gamma**	August 7, 1948	Bowling Green State University	Bowling Green, Ohio	Active	
Alpha Delta	November 6, 1948	Washington State University	Pullman, Washington	Inactive	
Alpha Epsilon	April 9, 1949	Emporia State University	Emporia, Kansas	Inactive	
Alpha Zeta	May 28, 1949	Eastern Washington University	Cheney, Washington	Inactive	
**Alpha Eta**	May 21, 1949	Central Connecticut State University	New Britain, Connecticut	Active	
Alpha Theta	May 27, 1950	Kent State University	Kent, Ohio	Inactive	
Alpha Iota		Southeastern Louisiana University	Hammond, Louisiana	Inactive	
Alpha Kappa		Western Michigan University	Kalamazoo, Michigan	Inactive	
Alpha Lambda	June 21, 1950	California State University, Fresno	Fresno, California	Inactive	
Alpha Mu	November 17, 1950	Texas State University	San Marcos, Texas	Inactive	
Alpha Nu	November 18, 1950	Texas A&M University–Kingsville	Kingsville, Texas	Inactive	
**Alpha Xi**	April 26, 1951	Iowa State University	Ames, Iowa	Active	
Alpha Omicron	November 4, 1950	Wayne State University	Detroit, Michigan	Inactive	
**Alpha Pi**	May 26, 1951	North Carolina State University	Raleigh, North Carolina	Active	
Alpha Rho	February 9, 1952	New York City College of Technology	Brooklyn, New York	Inactive	
Alpha Sigma		University of Florida	Gainesville, Florida	Inactive	
Alpha Tau	March 29, 1954	Western Washington University	Bellingham, Washington	Inactive	
Alpha Upsilon	March 26, 1955	Fairmont State University	Fairmont, West Virginia	Inactive	
Alpha Phi	May 28, 1955	California State University, Long Beach	Long Beach, California	Inactive	
Alpha Chi	April 2, 1955	Middle Tennessee State University	Murfreesboro, Tennessee	Inactive	
Alpha Psi	May 27, 1955	California State University, Los Angeles	Los Angeles, California	Inactive	
Alpha Omega	April 24, 1956	Florida International University	Miami, Florida	Inactive	
Beta Alpha	May 19, 1956	San Diego State University	San Diego, California	Inactive	
**Beta Beta**	May 12, 1956	San Francisco State University	San Francisco, California	Active	
Beta Gamma	June 2, 1956	Murray State University	Murray, Kentucky	Inactive	
Beta Delta	December 1, 1956	Oklahoma State University–Oklahoma City	Oklahoma City, Oklahoma	Inactive	
Beta Epsilon	April 26, 1958	Northern State University	Aberdeen, South Dakota	Inactive	
Beta Zeta	May 10, 1958	Missouri State University	Springfield, Missouri	Inactive	
Beta Eta	April 11, 1958	Austin Peay State University	Clarksville, Tennessee	Inactive	
**Beta Theta**	May 16, 1959	Fort Hays State University	Hays, Kansas	Active	
Beta Iota	July 2, 1962	Prairie View A&M University	Prairie View, Texas	Inactive	
	June 1, 1962	Iloilo Science and Technology University	Iloilo City, Philippines	Inactive	
Beta Kappa	April 6, 1963	University of Wisconsin–Platteville	Platteville, Wisconsin	Inactive	
Beta Lambda	March 30, 1963	Florida A&M University	Tallahassee, Florida	Inactive	
**Beta Mu**	May 11, 1963	East Carolina University	Greenville, North Carolina	Active	
	April 27, 1965	Philippine College of Arts and Trades	Manila, Philippines	Inactive	
Beta Nu	April 9, 1966	East Tennessee State University	Johnson City, Tennessee	Inactive	
**Beta Xi**	May 14, 1966	University of Southern Maine	Gorham, Maine	Active	
Beta Omicron	May 28, 1966	Berry College	Mount Berry, Georgia	Inactive	
**Beta Pi**	May 3, 1969	Cheyney University of Pennsylvania	Cheyney, Pennsylvania	Active	
Beta Rho	May 10, 1969	Georgia Southern University	Statesboro, Georgia	Inactive	
Beta Sigma	October 17, 1970	Rhode Island College	Providence, Rhode Island	Inactive	
Beta Tau	May 8, 1971	Humboldt State University	Arcata, California	Inactive	
Beta Upsilon	May 6, 1972	University of Northern Colorado	Greeley, Colorado	Inactive	
**Beta Phi**	November 7, 1973	Millersville University of Pennsylvania	Millersville, Pennsylvania	Active	
Beta Chi		Virginia Tech	Blacksburg, Virginia	Inactive	
Beta Psi		The College of New Jersey	Ewing Township, New Jersey	Inactive	
Beta Omega		Montana State University	Bozeman, Montana	Inactive	
Gamma Alpha		Northeastern State University	Tahlequah, Oklahoma	Inactive	
**Gamma Beta**		Farmingdale State College	East Farmingdale, New York	Active	
Gamma Gamma		University of North Dakota	Grand Forks, North Dakota	Inactive	
Gamma Delta		California Polytechnic State University, San Luis Obispo	San Luis Obispo, California	Inactive	
Gamma Epsilon		Appalachian State University	Boone, North Carolina	Active	
**Gamma Zeta**		North Carolina A&T State University	Greensboro, North Carolina	Active	
Gamma Eta		Tennessee Technological University	Cookeville, Tennessee	Inactive	
Gamma Theta		Illinois State University	Normal, Illinois	Inactive	
Gamma Iota		Nova Scotia Teachers College	Truro, Nova Scotia, Canada	Inactive	
Gamma Kappa		Purdue University North Central	Westville, Indiana	Inactive	
**Gamma Lambda**		Ohio Northern University	Ada, Ohio	Active	
**Gamma Mu**		Berea College, Eastern Kentucky University, and Morehead State University	Berea, Kentucky	Active	
Gamma Nu		California State University, San Bernardino	San Bernardino, California	Inactive	
Gamma Xi		North Dakota State College of Science	Wahpeton, North Dakota	Inactive	
**Gamma Omicron**	November 15, 1995	University of Nebraska at Kearney	Kearney, Nebraska	Active	
**Gamma Pi**		Texas Southern University	Houston, Texas	Active	
Gamma Rho		Purdue University	West Lafayette, Indiana	Inactive	
Gamma Sigma		Alcorn State University	Lorman, Mississippi	Inactive	
Gamma Tau		Clemson University	Clemson, South Carolina	Inactive	
Gamma Upsilon		Gwinnett Technical College	Lawrenceville, Georgia	Inactive	
**Gamma Phi**		Connecticut State Community College	Farmington, Connecticut	Active	(Note: This chapter includes all community college campuses in Connecticut.)
Gamma Chi		Owens Community College, Toledo Campus	Toledo, Ohio	Inactive	
Gamma Psi		South Carolina State University	Orangeburg, South Carolina	Inactive	
Gamma Omega		Bemidji State University	Bemidji, Minnesota	Inactive	
**Delta Alpha**		Eastern Michigan University	Ypsilanti, Michigan	Active	
**Delta Beta**		Jackson State University	Jackson, Mississippi	Active	
**Delta Gamma**		University of Texas at Tyler	Tyler, Texas	Active	
**Delta Delta**	2006	American InterContinental University	Atlanta, Georgia	Active	
Delta Epsilon		University of Cincinnati Clermont College	Batavia, Ohio	Inactive	
**Delta Zeta**		Michigan Technological University	Houghton, Michigan	Active	
**Delta Eta**		Chestnut Hill College	Philadelphia, Pennsylvania	Active	
**Delta Theta**		State University of New York at Cobleskill	Philadelphia, Pennsylvania	Active	
**Delta Iota**		Clark State College	Springfield, Ohio	Active	
Delta Kappa		Western Illinois University	Macomb, Illinois	Inactive	
**Delta Lambda**		Wilmington University	Wilmington Manor, Delaware	Active	
Delta Mu		California State University, Sacramento	Sacramento, California	Inactive	
**Delta Nu**		Southwest Virginia Community College	Cedar Bluff, Virginia	Active	
**Delta Xi**	2015	DeafTEC, Rochester Institute of Technology	Rochester, New York	Active	(Note: This chapter is designated for deaf and hard-of-hearing students.)
Delta Omicron		University of Maryland Eastern Shore	Princess Anne, Maryland	Inactive	
Delta Pi					
**Delta Rho**	2017	Glen Oaks Community College	Centreville, Michigan	Active	
**Delta Sigma**		University of Phoenix (all campuses)	Phoenix, Arizona	Active	
**Delta Tau**		American Public University System	Charles Town, West Virginia	Active	
Delta Upsilon					
**Delta Phi**		Laurel Ridge Community College	Middletown, Virginia	Active	
**Delta Chi**	2020	Curry College	Milton, Massachusetts	Active	
**Delta Psi**		Mississippi State University	Starkville, Mississippi	Active	
**Delta Omega**		Interactive College of Technology	Chamblee, Georgia	Active	
		University of Maine at Farmington	Farmington, Maine	Inactive	

== Alumni and professional chapters ==
In the following list of alumni or field chapters, active chapters are indicated in bold and inactive chapters are in italics.

Chapter	Charter date and range	Location	Status	Ref.
**Alpha Field**	December 19, 1947	Los Angeles, California	Active	
Beta Field	June 10, 1949	San Diego, California	Inactive	
Gamma Field	March 24, 1950	San Francisco Bay Area, California	Inactive	
Delta Field	February 17, 1951	Arizona State University, Tempe, Arizona	Inactive	
Epsilon Field	November 13, 1954	Burlington, Ontario, Canada	Inactive	
Zeta Field	May 8, 1954	Indianapolis, Indiana	Inactive	
Eta Field	April 6, 1956	Bradenton, Florida	Inactive	(Note: Chapter was established at the University of Tampa.)
Theta Field	April 7, 1956	San Juan, Puerto Rico	Inactive	
Iota Field	July 14, 1960	Bangkok, Thailand	Inactive	
Kappa FIeld	May 30, 1960	Philippines	Inactive	
**Lambda Field**	March 22, 1958	Sacramento, California	Active	
Mu Field	April 24, 1965 – 19xx ?	American Samoa	Inactive	
Nu Field	May 24, 1969	State of Colorado, Denver, Colorado	Inactive	
Xi Field	October 23, 1969	State of New Mexico, Portales, New Mexico	Inactive	
**Omicron Field**	January 15, 1972	Province of Alberta, Edmonton, Alberta, Canada	Active	
**Pi Field**		Willsboro, New York	Active	
Rho Field		University of Houston, Houston, Texas	Inactive	
Sigma Field		Palm Desert, California	Inactive	
Tau Field			Inactive	
**Upsilon Field**		Winchester, Virginia	Active	
