= Steve Wallace (American football) =

American football player (born 1964)

No. 74, 70
- Position: Offensive tackle

Personal information
- Born: December 27, 1964 (age 61); Atlanta, Georgia, U.S.
- Listed height: 6 ft 4 in (1.93 m)
- Listed weight: 285 lb (129 kg)

Career information
- High school: Chamblee (Chamblee, Georgia)
- College: Auburn
- NFL draft: 1986: 4th round, 101st overall pick

Career history
- San Francisco 49ers (1986–1995); Philadelphia Eagles (1996)*; San Francisco 49ers (1996); Kansas City Chiefs (1997)
- * Offseason or practice squad member only

Awards and highlights
- 3× Super Bowl champion (XXIII, XXIV, XXIX); 2× Second-team All-Pro (1992, 1994); Pro Bowl (1993); Third-team All-American (1985); First-team All-SEC (1985); Alabama Sports Hall of Fame

Career NFL statistics
- Games played: 176
- Games started: 127
- Fumble recoveries: 5
- Stats at Pro Football Reference

Barron Steven Wallace (born December 27, 1964) is an American former professional football player who was an offensive tackle for 12 seasons in the National Football League (NFL) for the San Francisco 49ers and the Kansas City Chiefs. He has since been recognized as having helped revolutionize the position of left tackle. In May 2012, he was inducted into the Alabama Sports Hall of Fame.

== College career ==
Wallace attended Chamblee High School in Atlanta and then Auburn University. Standing 6 ft, 5 inches, 280 lbs, was selected by Birmingham Stallions United States Football League territorial draft, as well as selected by the San Francisco 49ers in fourth round (101st pick overall) of NFL draft. Wallace blocked for Heisman Trophy winner Bo Jackson. Wallace also played in a game (Florida Gators vs Auburn Tigers in 1983) that showcased 25 athletes that made a professional football team roster. His head coach was future Hall of Fame inductee Pat Dye.

Wallace earned third-team All-America honors as a senior.

== Professional career ==
Wallace was drafted in the fourth round of the 1986 NFL Draft with the 101st overall pick by the San Francisco 49ers. Wallace was a part of three Super Bowl championships with the San Francisco 49ers (1988, 1989, and 1994). In Super Bowl XXIII, he was taken off the field with a broken ankle on the third play of the game. He was replaced by offensive tackle Bubba Paris.

He garnered Pro Bowl honors in 1992, 2 Pro Bowl 1st Alternate in 1993 & 1994 . Throughout his career, Wallace endured many concussions, and was known for wearing a styrofoam and rubber 1/2" cushioned helmet atop his normal helmet to reduce the impact. Wallace retired following the 1997 season, finishing his career with the Kansas City Chiefs. Wallace was one of the only 49ers to participate in two United Way commercials, earning him the "Community Player of the Year"- Extra Effort Award in 1992. Television Commentator John Madden called Wallace's football play as "nasty, tenacious and mean," "he played with a defensive players' mentality" earning 4 All-Madden Teams, and an All-Rookie Team.

Wallace and Jerry Rice were pictured celebrating after a touchdown; that picture was used to symbolize the winning tradition of the 49ers on a commemorative stamp for "The Team of the Eighties." Also, Coach Bill Walsh talked about Wallace being one of his favorite players in the book The Blind Side: Evolution of a Game and numerous other 49ers Championship Books. In 21 years of football (5 middle and high school, 4 college, 12 professional) Wallace never had a losing season, with his worst season being a 10-6 finish with the 49ers in 1991. He made a career of protecting the blind side of one of the greatest players in football history, Joe Montana. Wallace became an NFL pioneer by becoming the first lineman to earn a lucrative contract. Wallace earned the recognition of revolutionizing the left tackle position by having the ability to face such legends like Lawrence Taylor, Richard Dent, and Chris Doleman, etc. in one-on-one competition.

Wallace signed a one-year contract with the Philadelphia Eagles in 1996 but was cut by his new team at the end of training camp and promptly re-signed with the 49ers.

Wallace's charity, The Steve Wallace Foundation for Everyday Championship a non-profit organization 501C-3. Their mission is Working on educating and rebuilding youth self-esteem, character, knowledge in rural, urban or under privilege areas. The focus has been for the betterment of kids by providing the motivational component for kids to achieve and have focus in life.

== Personal life ==
Wallace is the nephew of comedian George Wallace.
