= Coleman Collins =

American artist and professional basketball player (born 1986)

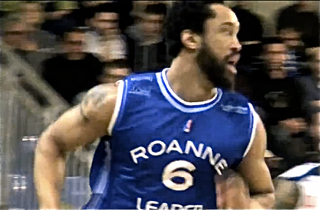
- Collins playing in the French Pro A, in 2012.

Personal information
- Born: July 22, 1986 (age 40) Princeton, New Jersey
- Listed height: 6 ft 9 in (2.06 m)
- Listed weight: 240 lb (109 kg)

Career information
- High school: Chamblee (Chamblee, Georgia)
- College: Virginia Tech (2003–2007), University of California, Los Angeles
- NBA draft: 2007: undrafted
- Playing career: 2007–2015
- Position: Power forward / center

Career history
- 2007–2008: EnBW Ludwigsburg
- 2008–2009: Fort Wayne Mad Ants
- 2009–2011: Ratiopharm Ulm
- 2011–2012: HKK Široki
- 2012–2013: Chorale Roanne
- 2013–2014: Azovmash
- 2014: Manama Club
- 2014–2015: BCM Gravelines

Career highlights
- Bosnian League champion (2012)

Coleman Alexander Collins (born July 22, 1986) is an American artist and a retired American professional basketball player who last played for BCM Gravelines of the LNB Pro A.

== Early life ==
Collins attended Chamblee High School in Chamblee, Georgia, where he played basketball and ran track. He was selected to the all-Atlanta Metro team as a senior, and was MVP of the Florida-Georgia All-Star Game. He also placed 3rd in the state finals in the 400m. He went on to play college basketball at Virginia Tech, where he scored 1144 points, averaging 10.5 points and 5.6 rebounds for his career.

== Professional career ==
Collins went undrafted in the 2007 NBA draft. In August 2007, he signed with EnBW Ludwigsburg in Germany. In May 2008, he left the team. He went on to sign a contract with the Phoenix Suns. After participating in training camp, he was released before the regular season began. He spent the 2008–09 season with the Fort Wayne Mad Ants of the NBDL. In July 2009, he signed with ratiopharm Ulm. He stayed with the German team for two seasons, leaving in May 2011.

In September 2011, he signed with HKK Široki in Bosnia. In the spring of 2012, he won both the Bosnian Cup and the league championship.

In July 2012, he signed a two-year contract with Chorale Roanne in France. In a breakout year, he averaged 10.6 points and 7 rebounds during the regular season, and increased his production by averaging 18.3 points and 7 rebounds in the playoffs. In June 2013, he activated a release clause in his contract and left the team, paying the buyout himself.

In July 2013, he signed a one-year deal with Azovmash of Ukraine. Following the events of the 2014 Ukrainian Revolution, amid the onset of the War in Donbass, he left Azovmash on March 1, 2014. Three days later, he signed with Manama Club of Bahrain. In May 2014, he won the Bahrani Championship.

On July 22, 2014, he signed a two-year deal with BCM Gravelines of the French LNB Pro A. On October 21, 2015, he parted ways with Gravelines after averaging 4.7 points and 2.7 rebounds per game.

== Personal life ==
Collins is also a freelance writer and artist. While at Virginia Tech he wrote a column for the student newspaper, The Collegiate Times. His writing has been published in various venues, including BOMB Magazine, ESPN.com, and the Huffington Post. Collins received a Master of Fine Arts from UCLA. In 2021, he showed artworks in museum exhibitions at the Kunsthalle Wien and the Carré d'Art, Nîmes.

In 2023, he became an assistant professor of art at the University of California, Irvine. In 2025, he was awarded a Guggenheim Fellowship.

He speaks several languages, including German, French and Spanish.
