= World Perfume =

- Founded: 1989; 37 years ago
- Defunct: 2007
- Headquarters: Dallas, Texas, United States
- Key people: Johnny Whitworth (president)
- Website: worldperfumeinc.com

World Perfume was a perfume company based in Dallas, Texas. The president of the company, Johnny Whitworth, was once a distributor for Scentura. World Perfume distributors bought perfume from headquarters and recruited salesmen with newspaper ads. Door-to-door salespeople were paid based on their sales commission, with no salary.

Like Scentura, the media publicity of the company was negative.

The company was opened in 1989. It closed in 2007.
