= 1973 DeKalb–Peachtree Airport Learjet crash =

Aviation accident in Georgia, United States

1973 DeKalb–Peachtree Airport Learjet 24 crash
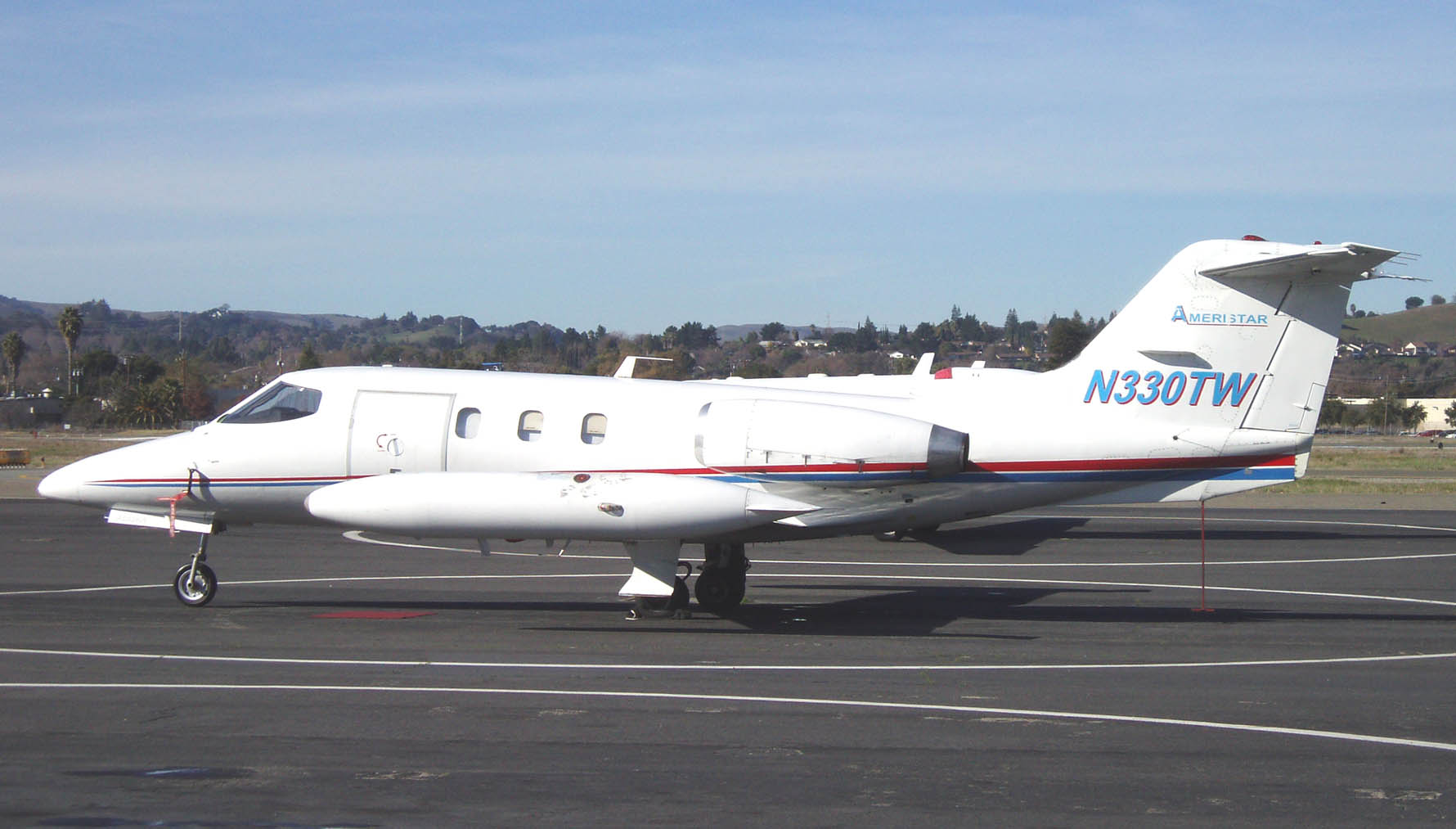
- A Learjet 24 similar to the accident aircraft

Accident
- Date: February 26, 1973
- Summary: Bird strike
- Site: DeKalb–Peachtree Airport, Chamblee, Georgia, United States; 33°50′25″N 84°19′7″W

Aircraft
- Aircraft type: Learjet 24
- Registration: N454RN
- Flight origin: DeKalb–Peachtree Airport, Chamblee, Georgia, United States
- Destination: Miami, Florida, United States
- Occupants: 7
- Passengers: 5
- Crew: 2
- Fatalities: 7
- Survivors: 0

Ground casualties
- Ground injuries: 1

On February 26, 1973, a private Learjet 24 crashed shortly after take-off from DeKalb–Peachtree Airport in Chamblee, Georgia, United States. The aircraft, registration N454RN, owned by a private corporation, struck birds shortly after lifting off. Air traffic control advised the flight crew of smoke trailing from their left engine; the crew said they would not be able to return to the airport. The aircraft impacted the roof of an apartment building and came to rest in a ravine. All five passengers and two crew members aboard the aircraft were killed; a person in the apartment building suffered severe burns.

A subsequent investigation by the National Transportation Safety Board (NTSB) confirmed the aircraft had impacted birds during take-off. Due to loss of power in the left engine, the flight crew were unable to control their aircraft before it struck the roof of the apartment building. The investigation further determined the Federal Aviation Administration (FAA) and officials at DeKalb–Peachtree Airport were aware of the danger of birds at the airport after a landfill site had opened in the vicinity of the airport ten years before the accident.

== Accident ==
The Learjet 24, registration N454RN, used for the flight between Chamblee, Georgia, and Miami, Florida, had been manufactured in 1966, and had accumulated 4,041 flying hours. Powered by two General Electric CJ610-4 turbojet engines, the aircraft was registered to Machinery Buyers Corporation, an Atlanta firm. A spokesperson for the company later told the Daily Record the aircraft was to pick up a customer in Miami. The flight crew consisted of captain Ernest Sellfors, aged 31, and first officer David Phillips, aged 27. Sellfors was permitted to fly Learjet 24, Learjet 23 and Hawker Siddeley 125 aircraft, and had a total of 5,600 flying hours, of which 2,150 were in jet aircraft. Phillips had begun flying in the Learjet 24 several weeks before the accident, and had accumulated a total of 4,000 flying hours in other aircraft.

The weather around the time of the accident was overcast, with a ceiling of 500 feet (150 m). Visibility was 4 miles (6.4 km), with a 4-knot wind at 60 degrees. At 10:10 Eastern Standard Time, air traffic control cleared the aircraft to take off from Runway 20L of DeKalb–Peachtree Airport. Witnesses told the NTSB the take-off path of the aircraft appeared to be normal, but it was trailing smoke when it crossed the airport perimeter. Controllers in the air traffic control tower observed the smoke and radioed the aircraft to notify them.

Tower:	Lear 454RN it appeared the left engine laid a pretty good layer of smoke out of the left side there for approximately 300 or 400 feet.
N454RN:	We just hit some birds.
Tower:	Roger, [are] you returning to land?
N454RN:	Don't believe we're gonna make it.

Witnesses also said they heard two explosive noises, the first as the aircraft "crossed the airport boundary and the second when the aircraft was about halfway between the airport and the crash site." Although most witnesses described the smoke as white or grey, two witnesses said black smoke and flames were visible at the rear of the aircraft. According to witness statements, the aircraft climbed to a height of between 250 feet (76 m) and 300 feet (91 m), before the nose began to rise. One said the aircraft was "wobbling" and another said they thought the aircraft had stalled. The aircraft impacted with the roof of a three-storey apartment building before it crashed into a wooded ravine approximately 250 feet from busy Buford Highway, a major Atlanta road lined with apartments. All five passengers and two crew members were killed in the accident, and an individual on the ground, standing in a parking lot, sustained serious burns from aviation fuel and remained in a critical condition for a day after the accident. The apartment building was damaged, and several parked vehicles destroyed.

== Investigation ==
=== Bird strikes ===
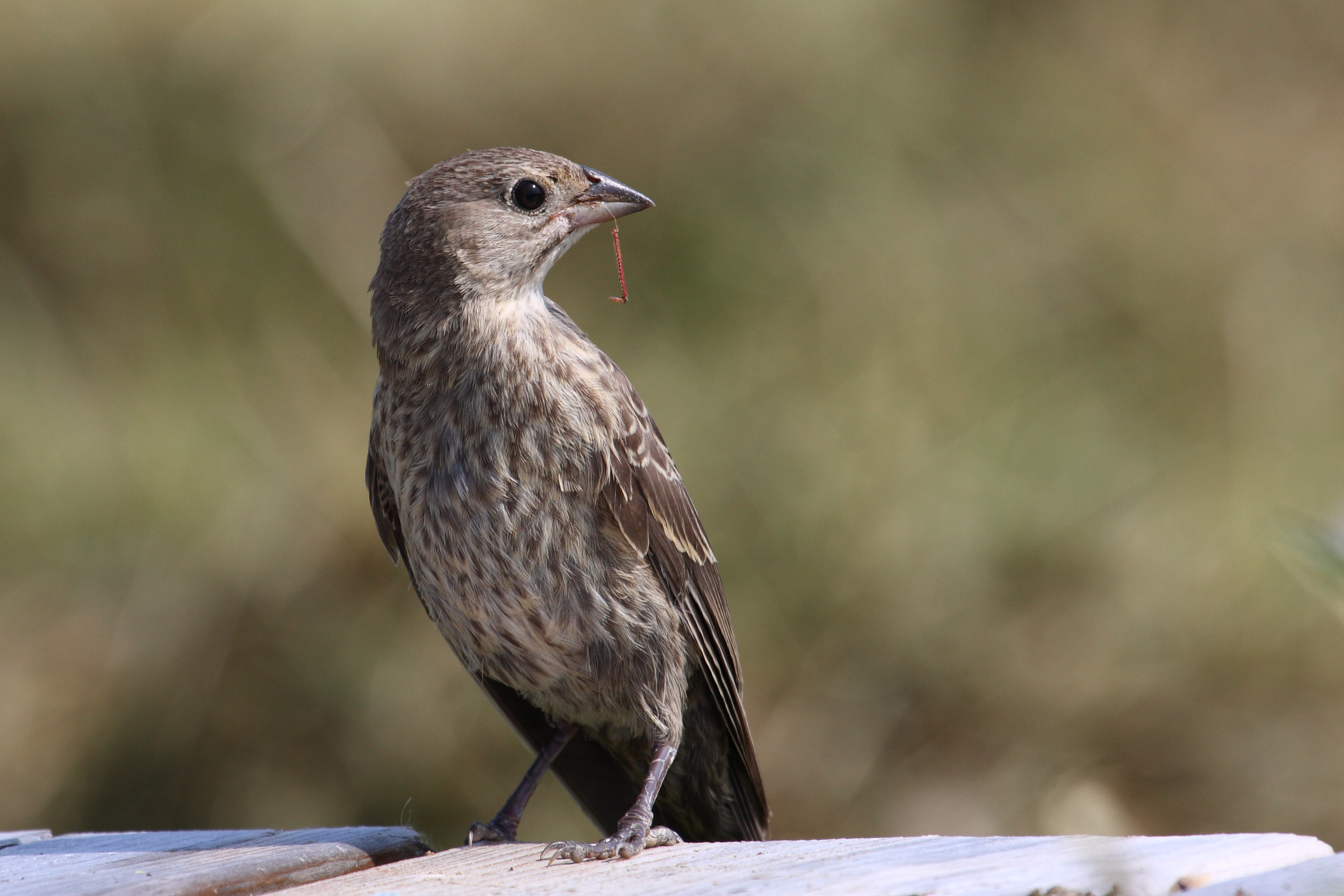
The remains of 15 cowbirds were found at the end of Runway 20L.

Upon reaching the accident site, investigators from the NTSB found both engines, the wings and empennage had separated from the fuselage, which had largely been consumed by fire. It was clear to investigators the aircraft had encountered a bird strike upon take-off. One pilot who landed at around the time the Learjet took off told the Associated Press, "Just as we came across the runway it was almost black with birds. They swarmed and parted as we went through them."

Analysis of the cockpit area found there was bird residue and feathers on the windshield and center post. The remains of 15 cowbirds were found within 150 feet (46 m) of the end of Runway 20L. These birds, the NTSB found, had collided with the aircraft structure. Examination of the two engines found evidence of foreign objects, which consisted of minute fragments of feathers. The objects had blocked cooling ports, and had damaged the rotor assembly inside the engine. It was found the left engine had encountered 14 separate bird strikes and the right engine had encountered five. When the birds entered the engine, they caused the compressors to stall; these were the two loud bangs the witnesses heard as the aircraft took off. As the aircraft passed over the perimeter fence, the left engine flamed out, and the trail of smoke was unburned fuel passing through the hot combustion and turbine sections. Investigators determined it was possible the flight crew had managed to restart the left engine.

To pass certification, the General Electric CJ610 turbojet engine underwent bird strike testing, during which chloroformed birds are passed through a test engine. However, the damage to both engines was, according to the NTSB, "considerably heavier" than it had been in the test engine. Because of the failure of the left engine, and the severe damage to the right engine, the aircraft was unable to remain airborne.

=== The airport ===
Formerly a military base, DeKalb–Peachtree Airport came under control of the DeKalb County government in 1960 for use as a civil airport. The County government told the FAA they would "take action to restrict the use of land adjacent to or in the immediate vicinity of the airport to activities and purposes compatible with normal airport operations including landing and take-off of aircraft." However, in the summer of 1962, ten years before the accident, a sanitary landfill site was opened in the vicinity of the airport. The NTSB report suggests birds were regularly attracted to the landfill site.

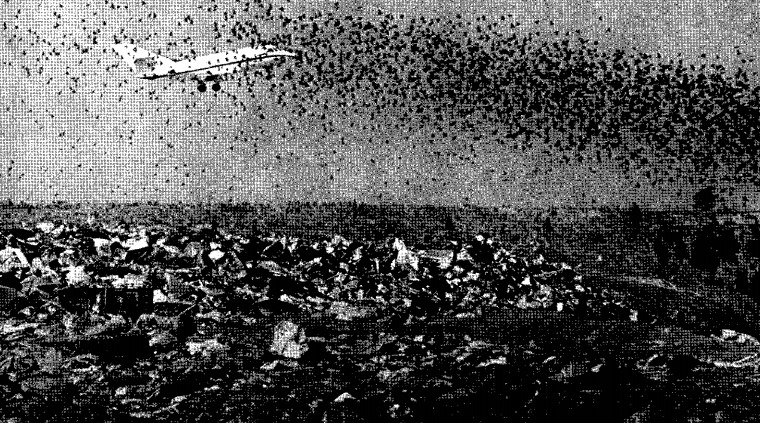
An image showing the proximity of the landfill site to aircraft departing from Runway 20L, and the number of birds that were attracted to the area

In 1970, the FAA contacted the County government and alerted them to the potential risk of a bird strike at the airport. "In February 1971, the FAA was advised by the County that the dump would be closed by August 1972," as stated in the NTSB accident report. However, the landfill site was not closed in 1972, and remained open at the time of the accident. Investigators concluded it was likely the dump was a factor in the accident: "There is little doubt that the municipal dump located adjacent to the airport property attracts birds which are a serious hazard to aircraft."

Furthermore, the NTSB concluded the FAA had not intervened to take action with regards to the dump. "In following up on the compliance requirements for airports developed or improved with Federal funds, the FAA did not take adequate measures, in accordance with existing statues, to assure that the hazard was removed from the vicinity of the airport." The NTSB was reportedly "concerned because responsible authorities had not taken due cognizance of the bird hazards to aircraft at the DeKalb–Peachtree Airport." The final report stated,

Many airports are confronted with perennial or seasonal bird problems, and all such airports should employ methods to minimize the hazard. Public and private studies have shown that the elimination of food and water sources in the vicinity of airports is the most effective means of combating the bird hazard. Open garbage dumps attract birds, and the location of these facilities around airports is not compatible with normal airport operations.

=== Conclusions ===
The final NTSB accident report concluded the probable cause of the accident was the loss of power due to a bird strike to both engines. The risk of bird strikes was, the Board found, magnified by the landfill site located adjacent to the airport. The FAA and airport authorities were both aware of the danger, and did not act on the information. The final report stated,

The National Transportation Safety Board determines that the probable cause of this accident was the loss of engine thrust during take-off due to ingestion of birds by the engines, resulting in loss of control of the airplane. The Federal Aviation Administration and the Airport Authority were aware of the bird hazard at the airport; however, contrary to previous commitments, the airport management did not take positive action to remove the bird hazard from the airport environment.

=== Recommendations ===
In the aftermath of the accident, the NTSB made several recommendations. They recommended the FAA "develop and implement a procedure for more stringent and continued surveillance" of airports which develop properties adjacent to the flight paths of aircraft, and "impose timely sanctions against operators of facilities which receive Federal aid and do not fully comply with the requirements imposed upon them." They also advised the FAA to circulate material around airports warning authorities of the dangers posed by landfill sites in the vicinity of runways.

== See also ==
- 1973 in aviation
- Aviation safety
- List of accidents and incidents involving commercial aircraft
- Other accidents and incidents resulting from birdstrikes
  - US Airways Flight 1549
  - Ethiopian Airlines Flight 604
  - Eastern Air Lines Flight 375
  - Ural Airlines Flight 178
