= Chamblee High School =

Public high school in Chamblee, Georgia, United States

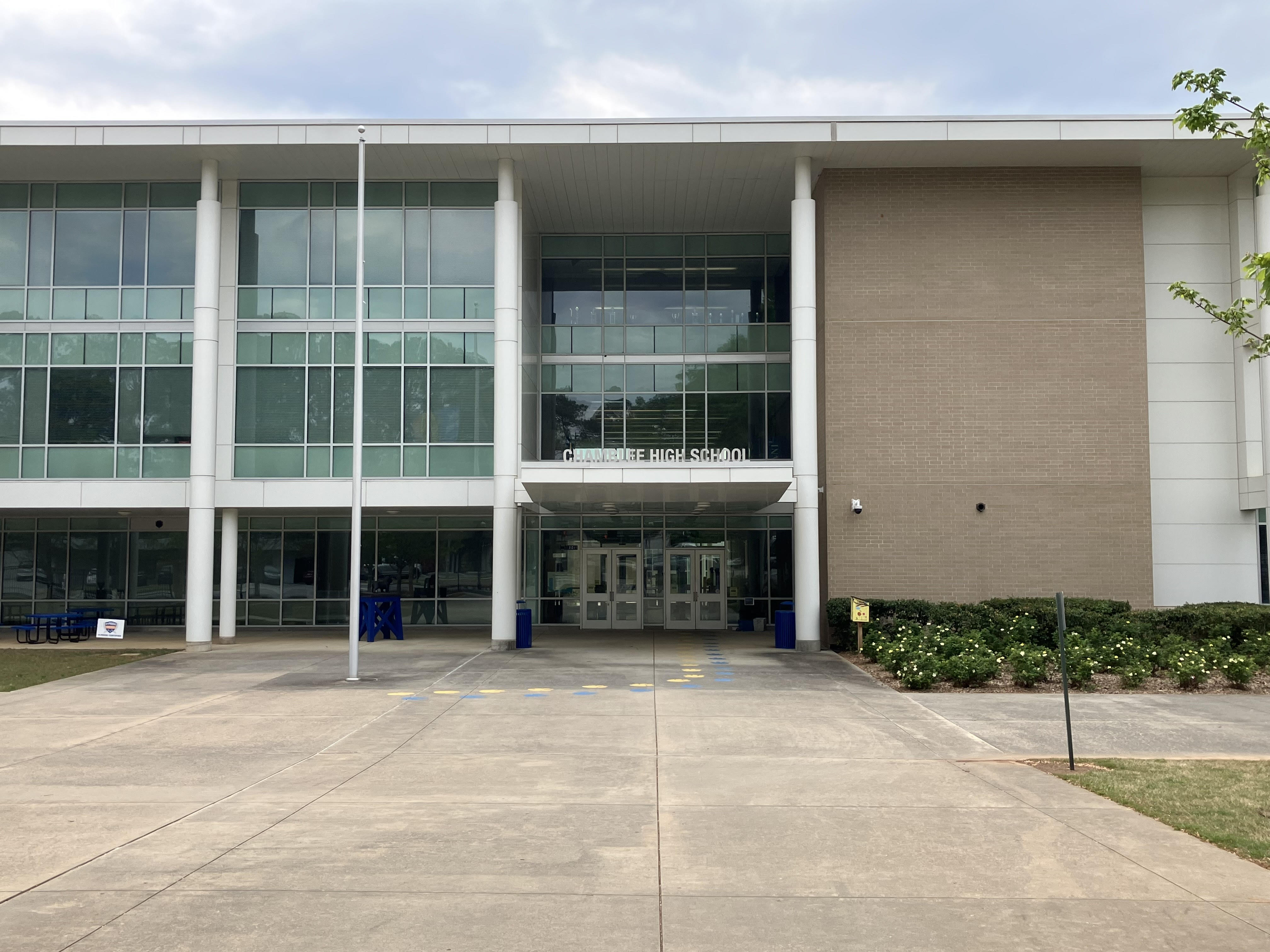
- Chamblee High School in April 2025

Location
- 3688 Chamblee Dunwoody Road; Chamblee, Georgia 30341; United States; 33°53′54″N 84°18′23″W

Information
- Other name: Chamblee High School
- Type: Public high school
- Established: 1917
- School district: DeKalb County School District
- Principal: Gail Barnes
- Teaching staff: 108.00 (FTE)
- Grades: 9–12
- Enrollment: 1,829 (2023-2024)
- Student to teacher ratio: 16.94
- Campus: Suburban
- Colors: Blue and gold
- Mascot: Bulldog
- Rival: Dunwoody High School
- Newspaper: The Blue and Gold
- Website: chambleehs.dekalb.k12.ga.us

Chamblee High School, formerly known as Chamblee Charter High School, is a public secondary school located in Chamblee, Georgia, United States. As of 2010, it serves 1512 students in grades 9–12. It is the second oldest high school of the DeKalb County School District, having opened in 1917.

Chamblee was a charter school until 2021 and accepts students from all of DeKalb County as well as from its local district. Chamblee was named a National Blue Ribbon School of Excellence in 1996 and is one of 27% of schools in DeKalb to make the AYP of the No Child Left Behind Act. In 2010, Chamblee was ranked #215 of the 1500 best public high schools by Newsweek magazine. Its students' SAT scores are ranked first in DeKalb County and sixth in the state.

When adjusted for differences in demographics, Chamblee High School has the highest SAT scores of all Atlanta-metro schools (including Cobb, Gwinnett, and Forsyth). Its 84th percentile ranking is superior to Walton (73rd percentile) and other suburban counterparts. The student body also has one of the highest acceptance rates to tier 1 colleges and universities in the state of Georgia. The school offers a variety of extracurricular activities, courses, and sports. There are elective performing art classes which are bolstered by performances. CCHS offers 32 AP courses, the most of any high school in DeKalb County, and was named an AP Honor School in 2011 for every category in which it was eligible.

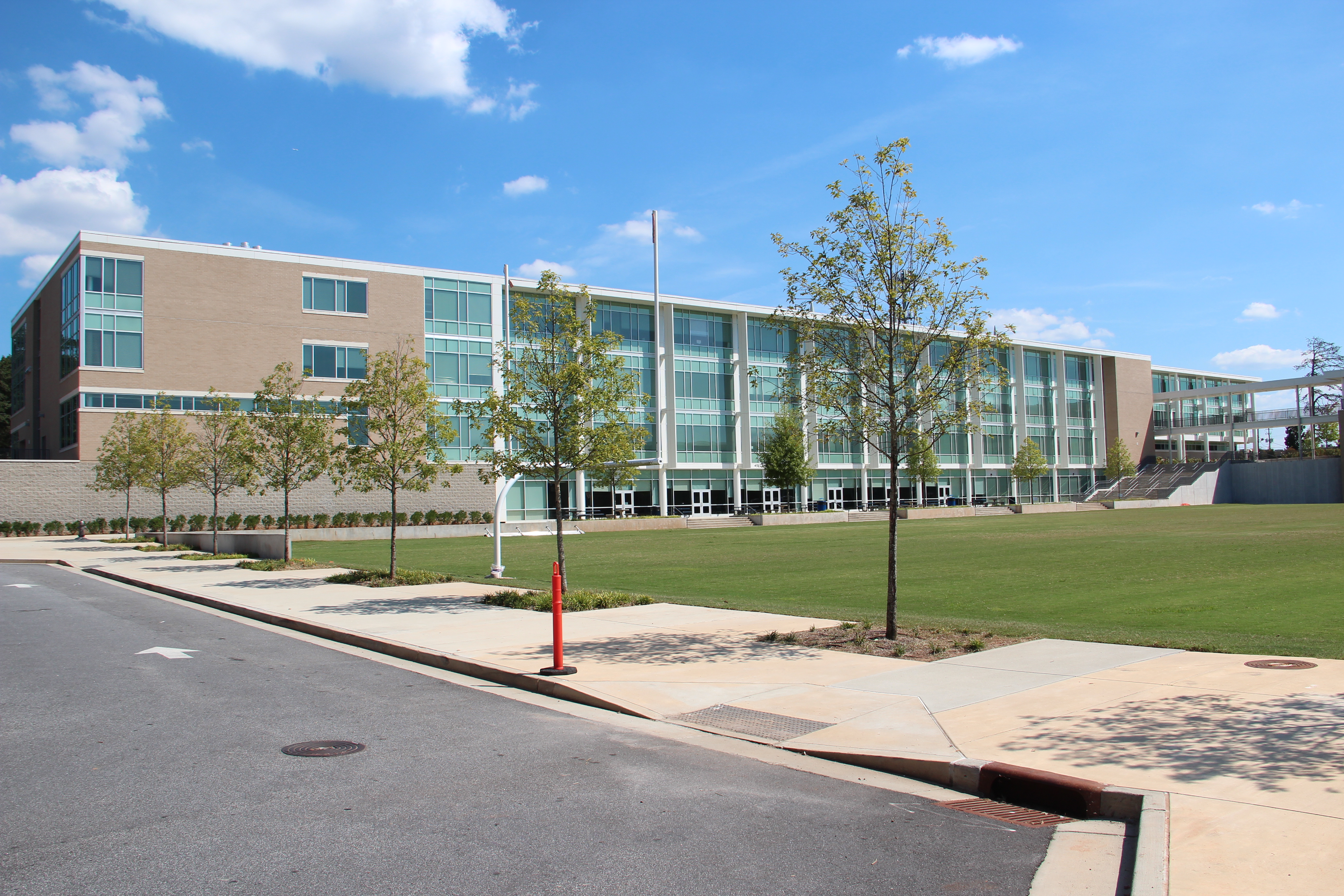
Chamblee Charter High School September 2016

== History ==
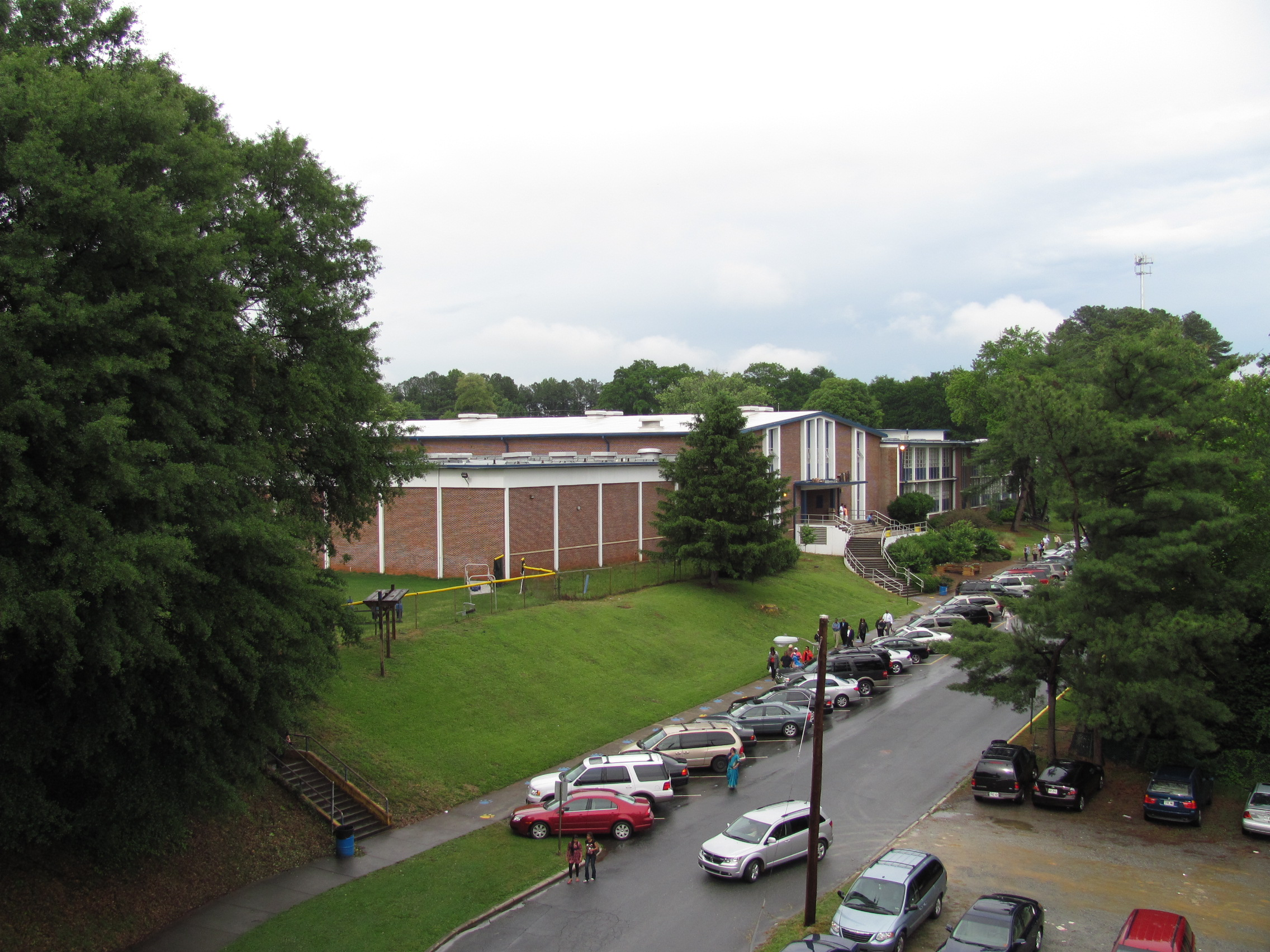
Graduation Day, 2010

- Prior to 1917: Chamblee High School and Chamblee Elementary School were housed in a single building on the present site of the First Baptist Church of Chamblee.
- 1917: DeKalb County authorized the purchase of land for the high school on Chamblee Dunwoody road. Construction began.
- 1919: The first classes were held in the partially completed school.
- 1922: M.E. "Prof" Smith was named principal. He served for 35 years.
- 1924: Ten classrooms and DeKalb County's first gymnasium were added to the campus.
- 1928: A home economics building was added.
- 1934: Depression-era WPA funding allowed Chamblee High School to add eight new classrooms, a new gymnasium, a canning plant, and a machine shop. The school became the first in DeKalb County to be accredited by the Southern Association of Colleges and Schools.
- December 8, 1941: The entire campus burned to the ground. Classes were relocated to area hospitals and Baptist and Methodist churches.
- December 1942: The high school was rebuilt and classes resumed on campus.
- 1950: A lighted general athletic field was built for football and baseball games.
- 1962: North DeKalb Stadium opened next door to Chamblee High School.
- 1964: The school was remodeled, adding 19 classrooms and five laboratories.
- 1966: The new basketball gymnasium, chorus rooms, band rooms, and swimming pool were added.
- 1970: The old basketball gymnasium and home economics building were demolished. A new cafeteria was built on the site.
- 1973: The old 1942 classrooms were demolished and a new administration building and library were built.
- 1991: The first magnet class entered Chamblee High School.
- 1994: Chamblee High was named a National School of Excellence.
- 2001: Chamblee High was named a State School of Excellence.
- 2001: Chamblee High became a charter school.
- 2011: Senior and Sophomore halls were torn down for the rebuilding of the new school.
- December 20, 2013: Demolition of the remaining old building started.
- January 7, 2014: The new academic building held its first day of school.

== Facility ==
The school is adjacent to North DeKalb Stadium, which is used by many sports teams and local schools. It was last renovated in 2014, using $58 million in federal stimulus bonds as well as $11 million already set aside by the special-purpose local-option sales tax.

== Athletics ==
The Chamblee Bulldogs participate in baseball, basketball, badminton, cheerleading, cross country, football, golf, lacrosse, soccer, softball, swimming & diving, tennis, track and field, ultimate frisbee, volleyball, water polo, and wrestling. The varsity football, lacrosse and soccer teams play their home games at North DeKalb Stadium in Chamblee.

== State championships ==
As of the 2021–22 season.

Type	Competition	State Titles	Season(s)	Sources
Boys Sports	Baseball	0		
Boys Sports	Basketball	0		
Boys Sports	Cross Country	1	1986	
Boys Sports	Football	0		
Boys Sports	Golf	0		
Boys Sports	Ice Hockey	0		
Boys Sports	Lacrosse	0		
Boys Sports	Soccer	1	2008	
Boys Sports	Swimming	0		
Boys Sports	Wrestling	2	1974, 1979	
Boys Sports	Tennis	2	1998, 2019	
Boys Sports	Track & Field	3	1954, 1960, 1964	
Girls Sports	Basketball	0		
Girls Sports	Cheerleading	3	2007, 2008, 2009	
Girls Sports	Cross Country	1	1981	
Girls Sports	Golf	0		
Girls Sports	Lacrosse	0		
Girls Sports	Soccer	2	2022, 2023	
Girls Sports	Softball	0		
Girls Sports	Swimming	1	2019	
Girls Sports	Tennis	3	2017, 2018, 2019	
Girls Sports	Track & Field	0		
Girls Sports	Volleyball	0		

Key:

School Boys' Record
School Girls' Record

=== Athletics ===
- Boys' track: 1954, 1960, 1964
- Wrestling: 1974, 1979
- Boys' tennis: 1998, 2019
- Girls' tennis: 2017, 2018, 2019
- Girls' cross country: 1981
- Boys' cross country: 1986
- Boys' soccer: 2008
- Girls soccer: 2022, 2023
- Cheerleading: 2007, 2008, 2009
- Boys' swimming: 400 free relay (2015), 2015, 200 freestyle (2013, 100 breaststroke) (2008, 50 freestyle)
- Girls' swimming: 2019 AAAA-AAAAA State Champions, 200 medley relay (2019, 2017, 1975), 100 Butterfly (2019, 2018, 2017, 2016), 200 IM (2019, 2018), (2004, 50 freestyle) (1987, 100 butterfly) (1983, 100 butterfly) (1976, 200 freestyle and 100 freestyle; 1975, 200 freestyle and 100 butterfly; 1974, 200 IM and 100 butterfly) (1974, 500 freestyle), Lanoue (1956, 200 freestyle)
- Boys' Volleyball: 1975

=== Academics ===
- TEAMS (academic competition): 2009, 2010
- PAGE Academic Bowl: 1994, 2011
- Science Olympiad: 1997, 1998
- Math Team: 2003
- Math Counts: 1991, 1992
- We The People: The Citizen and the Constitution: 1995, 1996, 2004, 2006, 2007, 2012
- Chess: 2006, 2007
- GearGrinders - FIRST Robotics Team: 2006
- Debate 2006, 2007
- Odyssey of the Mind: 2004, 2005, 2006

== Feeder schools ==
The following schools feed into Chamblee Charter High School:

- Chamblee Middle School
- Sequoyah Middle School

The following schools feed into Chamblee Middle School:

- Ashford Park
- Huntley Hills
- Kittredge Magnet School
- Montgomery

== School newspaper ==
The Blue and Gold is Chamblee Charter High School's official school newspaper. The current faculty advisor of the Blue and Gold is Fred Avett. Currently, the Blue and Gold is published online and in a print format.

== Notable alumni ==
This is a list of notable alumni that graduated from Chamblee Charter High School, sorted by year of graduation.

- John Casper (Class of 1961), space shuttle astronaut
- Andy Spiva (Class of 1973), former Atlanta Falcons linebacker
- Susan Walters (Class of 1980), actress and former model
- Steve Wallace (Class of 1982), former San Francisco 49ers tackle, part of three Super Bowl championships with the San Francisco 49ers (1988, 1989, 1994)
- Teresa Tomlinson (Class of 1983), former mayor of Columbus, Georgia and 2020 Democratic candidate for United States Senate
- Troy Sadowski (Class of 1984), former Atlanta Falcons tight end
- Ryan Gravel (Class of 1991), creator of the Atlanta Beltline
- Tim Chen (Class of 2000), founder and CEO of NerdWallet
- Coleman Collins (Class of 2003), basketball player and writer
- Paul Delaney (Class of 2004), basketball player in the Israeli National League
- Warren Norman (Class of 2009), former football player for the Vanderbilt Commodores
- Giselle Washington (Class of 2019), soccer player for the Tennessee Lady Volunteers, represents Jamaica internationally
- Solai Washington (Class of 2024), soccer player for the Florida State Seminoles, represents Jamaica internationally
