= DeKalb–Peachtree Airport =

Airport in Georgia, United States

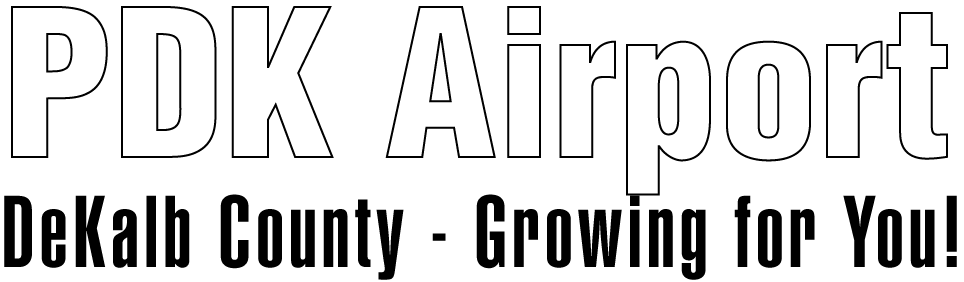

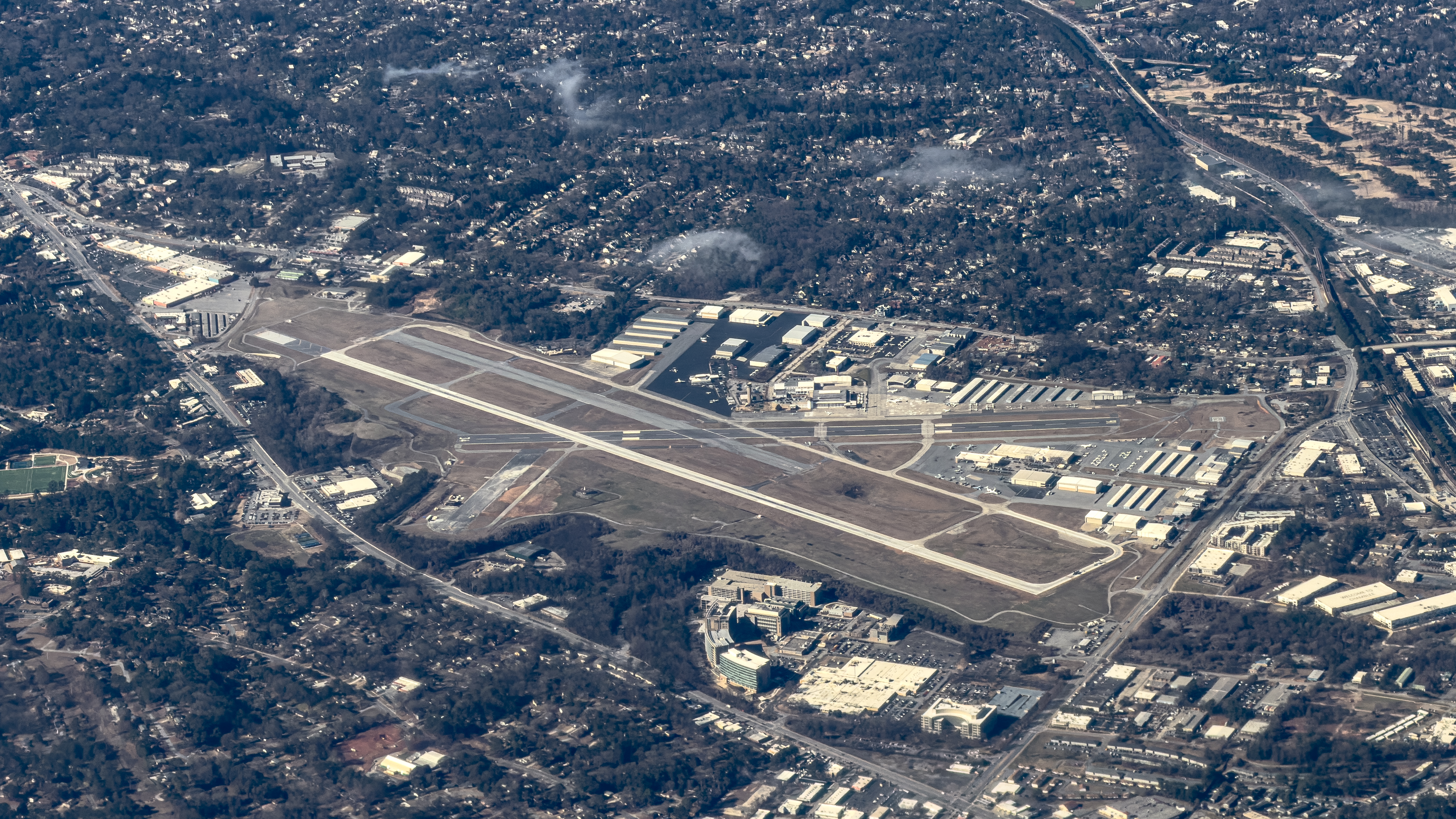
- Aerial view, 2026
- IATA: PDK; ICAO: KPDK; FAA LID: PDK

Summary
- Airport type: Public
- Owner: DeKalb County
- Serves: Atlanta, Georgia
- Location: Chamblee, Georgia
- Elevation AMSL: 1,003 ft (306 m)
- Coordinates: 33°52′32″N 084°18′07″W
- Website: pdkairport.com

Map
- Location of airport in Georgia PDK (the United States)

Runways
Direction	Length		Surface
Direction	ft	m	Surface
3R/21L	6,001	1,829	Concrete
3L/21R	3,746	1,142	Asphalt
16/34	3,968	1,209	Asphalt

Helipads
Number	Length		Surface
Number	ft	m	Surface
H1	56	17	Concrete

Statistics (2021)
- Aircraft operations: 158,104
- Based aircraft: 306
- Source: Federal Aviation Administration

DeKalb–Peachtree Airport (IATA: PDK, ICAO: KPDK, FAA LID: PDK), also known as Peachtree–DeKalb Airport, is a county-owned, public-use airport in DeKalb County, Georgia, United States. The airport is located in the city of Chamblee, just northeast of Atlanta. It operates 24 hours per day, although it is uncontrolled from 11:00 PM EST to 6:30 AM EST (Monday through Friday) or 7:00 AM EST (Saturday through Sunday).

As per Federal Aviation Administration records, the airport had 1,784 passenger boardings (enplanements) in calendar year 2008, 393 enplanements in 2009, and 463 in 2010. It is included in the National Plan of Integrated Airport Systems for 2011–2015, which categorized it as a reliever airport.

== History ==
=== Camp Gordon ===
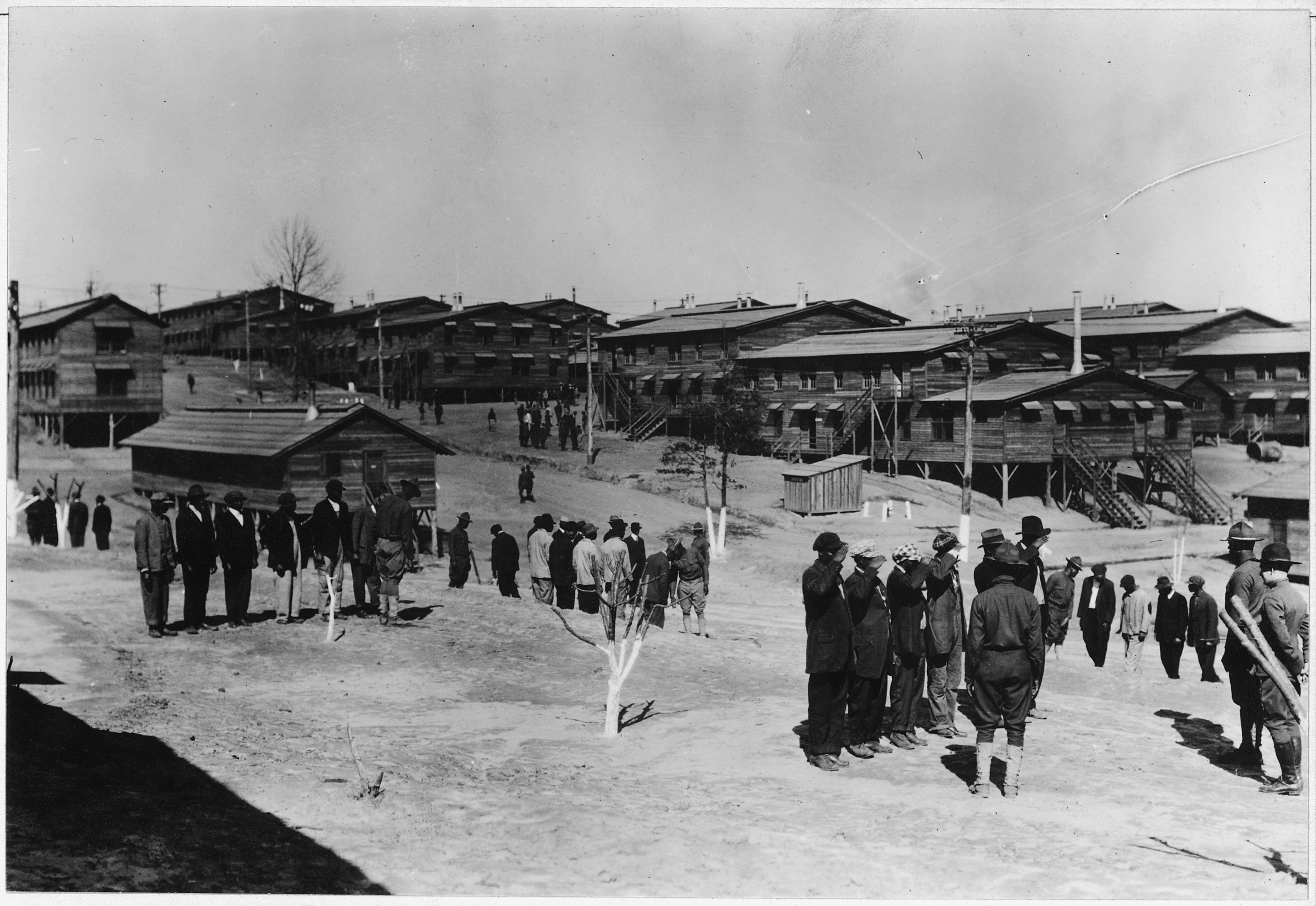
Camp Gordon, Atlanta circa 1917

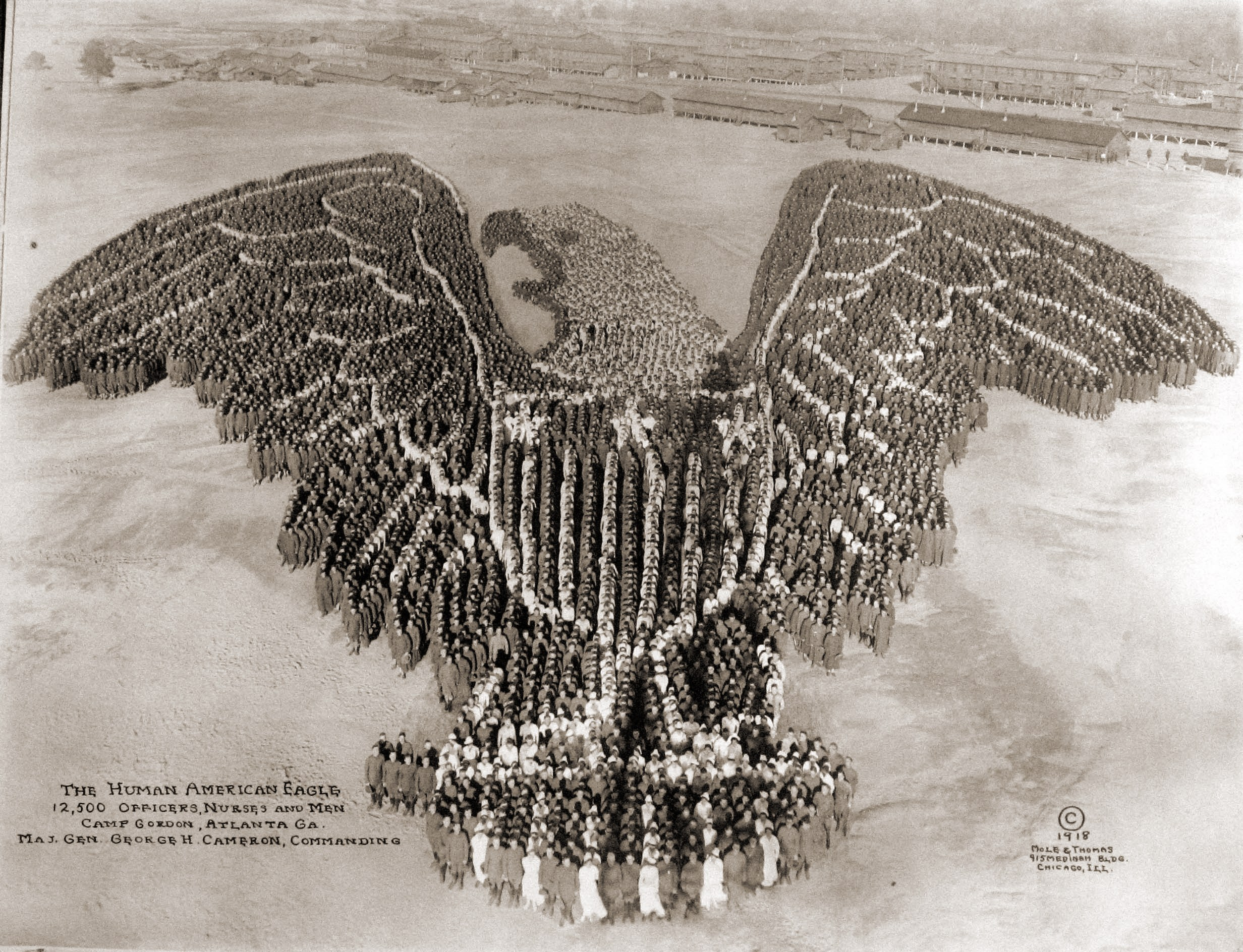
The Human American Eagle, taken at Camp Gordon, 1918, 12,500 people

The United States Army established many war-training camps during World War I. Chamblee, northeast of Atlanta, was selected for one of the state's largest army cantonments. It was named Camp Gordon in honor of John Brown Gordon, who was a major general in the Confederate army, a Georgia governor, a U.S. senator, and a businessman. The camp opened in July 1917, becoming a training site and home of the famous 82nd Division. The division was composed of men from several different states, but men from Georgia made up almost half its number. Among the men trained at Camp Gordon, during that period, was the future Medal of Honor recipient Alvin York.

The 157th Depot Brigade was located at Camp Gordon, which received, organized and equipped troops in preparation for further assignments. The unit also received returning troops from war time service and completed their out processing and discharges.

Camp Gordon fielded football teams in 1917 and 1918 that competed in those NCAA college football seasons.

This camp was in operation until the sale of real estate and buildings was ordered in 1920. It was abandoned in September 1921.

(The Army re-created a different Camp Gordon in Augusta, 150 miles [240 km] away, during World War II. It was renamed Fort Gordon in 1956.)

=== Naval Air Station Atlanta ===
In 1940, the United States government authorized construction of a military airport on the former site of the Chamblee camp. The airport began operations on March 22, 1941, a few months before the U.S. entry into World War II, as Naval Air Station Atlanta. The airport was from the county by the United States Navy.

Barracks constructed at the facility during the war became classrooms in late 1948 for Southern Technical Institute, a new engineering technology school created by Georgia Tech for former soldiers.

Naval Air Station Atlanta subsequently moved to Marietta on the south side of what is now called Dobbins Air Reserve Base. NAS Atlanta was ultimately closed by Base Realignment and Closure Commission (BRAC) action in 2009, and became General Lucius D. Clay National Guard Center.

Like NAS Atlanta, the Southern Technical Institute moved from PDK in 1958, to land donated by Dobbins, and it now operates as Southern Polytechnic College of Engineering and Engineering Technology, a part of Kennesaw State University.

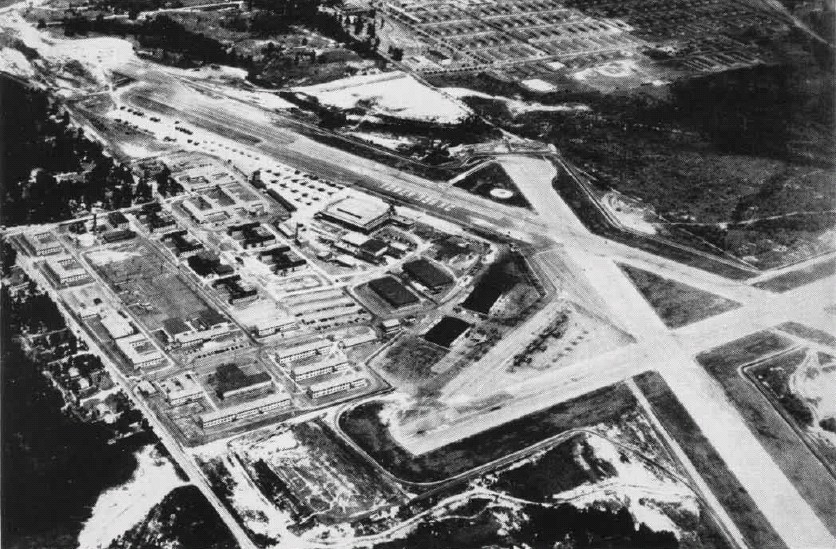
NAS Atlanta at Dekalb-Peachtree in the mid-1940s

=== Commercial airport ===
The airport was converted from military to civilian use from 1957 to 1959.

In 2017, Ultimate Air Shuttle began operating commercial flights between PDK and Lunken Field in Cincinnati. Service was expanded to connect PDK with Charlotte Douglas International Airport in 2019. However, service was suspended in 2020 in response to the COVID-19 pandemic.

== Facilities and aircraft ==
Dekalb–Peachtree Airport covers an area of 745 acres (301 ha) at an elevation of 1,003 feet (306 m) above mean sea level. It has three runways: 3R/21L (formerly 2R/20L) is 6,001 by 100 feet (1,829 x 30 m) with a concrete surface; 3L/21R (formerly 2L/20R) is 3,746 by 150 feet (1,142 x 46 m) with an asphalt surface; and 16/34, which is 3,968 by 150 feet (1,209 x 46 m) with an asphalt surface. It also has one helipad designated H1 with a concrete surface measuring 56 by 56 feet (17 x 17 m).

For the 12-month period ending December 31, 2021, the airport had 158,104 aircraft operations, an average of 433 per day: 75% transient general aviation and 25% local general aviation. At that time there were 306 aircraft based at this airport: 213 single-engine, 21 multi-engine, 58 jet, 12 helicopter, and 2 gliders.

The airport has over 100 hangars. It is the second-busiest airport in Georgia, behind Hartsfield–Jackson Atlanta International Airport (ATL), in the number of flight operations per year and is the seventh-busiest general aviation (non-airline) airport in the US. PDK helps to relieve ATL of smaller-aircraft traffic. It is used by helicopters for metro Atlanta's four major network-affiliated television stations (WAGA-TV, WANF, WSB-TV, and WXIA-TV) as the base for electronic news gathering from the air. PDK is also home to The AutoPILOT Magazine, an advertorial publication covering all things aviation-related. A new control tower was built in 1988, and stands at 130 feet (40 m) tall. Many of the old NAS Atlanta buildings still remain. The largest houses offices for PDK administration, flight schools, and the Civil Air Patrol, as well as the Downwind restaurant, with an aviation-themed decor and an open deck overlooking the active runways. Adjacent to that building is a children's playground, Georgia's first aviation park.

In late 2018, the first EMAS installed in Georgia was added to runway 3R/21L.

Aero Center Atlanta, the airport's full service fixed-base operator, is located on 21 acres (8.5 ha) in a modern facility, elsewhere on the airport grounds.

== Economic impact ==
In 1997, DeKalb Peachtree Airport was one of the largest tax contributors of DeKalb County, behind The Southern Company and Bellsouth, but receives no taxpayer dollars for operations. The 1997 study funded by the airport found that in addition to 762 aviation-related jobs at the airport, there may be 3,600 non-airport jobs driven by airport activities like taxi drivers and cleaning personnel.

== Accidents ==
- On February 26, 1973, a Learjet 24 crashed trying to return to the airport after suffering a bird strike after takeoff.
- On May 14, 2016, a biplane crashed into the ground at the “Good Neighbor Day” air show while trying to pull up from a loop de loop. The one pilot was killed in the accident.
- On October 8th, 2021, a Cessna 210 Centurion crashed shortly after takeoff, killing all four occupants.

== See also ==
- List of airports in Georgia (U.S. state)
