= Central Avenue (Albany, New York) =

Coordinates: 42°41′57″N 73°48′42.4″W

Central Avenue, in Albany, New York, is an 18 km stretch in Albany County, of the 26 km Albany-Schenectady Turnpike, which runs from Lark Street in the city of Albany, westward through the towns of Colonie, New York and Niskayuna, New York, to the city of Schenectady, New York. In Albany County it is called Central Avenue, and in Schenectady County (Niskayuna and Schenectady) it is called State Street. The entire route is designated as a part of New York State Route 5, which stretches to the Pennsylvania state line and terminates at Central Avenue's east end.

== History ==
The Mohawk Valley transportation route

Albany, on the Hudson River, and Schenectady, on the Mohawk River, are anchor points on the Mohawk Valley transportation route between the Atlantic Ocean and points west of the mountains which span North America from Georgia to Maine. Albany is the farthest north an ocean ship can sail up the Hudson, and Schenectady is the easternmost point of navigation on the Mohawk (due to Cohoes Falls). Connecting these two points with an overland route has always been important in trade and travel.

Originally, there was a footpath and canoe portage used by Indians called the Iroquois Trail. Around 1660, the Dutch cleared a road between the two cities, called King's Highway, which still exists in places as King's Road in Albany and Albany Street in Schenectady. In 1797 a new, perfectly straight and very wide thoroughfare was created called the Albany-Schenectady Turnpike (later, Albany-Schenectady Road, at the turn of the 20th century). This was the major way to travel, and for trade to ship, between the Atlantic Ocean and the Great Lakes region, including all points in between along the Mohawk River before the opening of the Erie Canal (1825) and the Albany and Schenectady Railroad (1831).

Central Avenue has, since then, been the main thoroughfare for commerce in the city of Albany. Originally the street was called "The Bowery." (Dutch settlers named it "Bouwerie", an older Dutch term for a farm road). The name dropped out of favor due to the pre-Civil War decline of the neighborhood along the Bowery in New York City. On July 15, 1867, Albany's Common Council officially renamed the road Central Avenue, though the term had unofficially been used well before.

== Management ==
The Central Avenue corridor is currently managed by a Business Improvement District called the Central District Management Association, Inc.

== Chinatown ==
A Chinatown (Chinese: 奥尔巴尼唐人街; pinyin: ào ěr bā ní táng rén jiē) is located around Central Avenue in the downtown district with 303 Central Avenue being the location of the Chinatown mall. According to Tsui in her book, Albany's Chinatown is classified as a "commercial Chinatown" with Las Vegas, Atlanta, and Orlando cited as examples in this category. Since its establishment around 2009 according to some sources, the Chinatown has been a "work in progress".

The city of Albany has around 989 Chinese, about 1.2% of its population, according to the 2010 U.S. Census data with a total Asian population of around 3,000. The first Chinese to arrive in Albany was not well documented until the first Chinese business was registered in 1877 located at 668 Broadway. From 1886 to the 1920s, Albany's Chinese population grew, where the number of Chinese laundromats grew from 9 to about 24. Like the rest of the country, the Chinese Exclusion Act kept the population in this city small. It was documented that most of the original Chinese population who migrated to Albany, did so through the Hudson River, a common migration route for those who settled in the Capital District from New York City. Many of the first Chinese residents of Albany lived around Green Street and Hudson Avenue. By the year 1920, the city was home to only two Chinese restaurants on Green Street. Later on, the famous "Oriental Occidental Restaurant" opened at 44 State Street but closed and is now the "... site of Jack's Oyster House."

Albany's history until the 21st century showed a lack of reputation as a cultural hub, that in 1982, then-New York City Mayor Ed Koch derided Albany as “a city without a good Chinese restaurant.” However, due to the flourishing nanotechnology and high-technology sectors, the city will be getting a new Chinatown by early 2013 to service the metropolitan area's growing Chinese community, to be located at 303 Central Avenue, featuring a teahouse and a variety of Asian stores, according to an article from Biz Journals. This Chinatown will supposedly be a "work in progress".

== See also ==
- New York State Route 5
