= Scentura =

Perfume company

Scentura Creations
- Company type: Private
- Industry: Multi-level marketing, perfume
- Founded: 1975
- Headquarters: Chamblee, Georgia
- Website: scenturacreations.com

Scentura also known as Scentura Creations is a perfume company based in the city of Chamblee, Georgia, within the Atlanta metropolitan area. It is a multilevel selling company which manufactures inexpensive imitations of designer fragrances. Independent salespeople are sent out, often in pairs, to sell perfume door-to-door, in parking lots, malls, or in other retail stores.

== History ==
Scentura was founded in 1975 by Larry Hahn as W.M. Industries Inc. (WMI), a door-to-door retail business which sold luggage, toys and perfume. In a 1984 motivation film, Hahn described his early experience:

Fifteen years ago I slept in my car, and I had no finances, I had no education, and I just said one day, if I could hook myself to the proper vehicle to get a break in life and make some money, I would help other people.

In 1975, with loans from friends, Hahn purchased his first product: 31-piece sets of bakeware. For several years Hahn trained new recruits himself. By the 1980s there were thousands of distributors.

== Business model ==
Every manager and perfume salesperson must first sign an independent contract. Scentura is not responsible for either the ads or the tactics used by salespeople. Scentura distributors recruit salespeople by placing classified advertisements in the employment section of the newspaper under the heading of "Management". Turnover tends to be very high. Training is from six to eight weeks.

There are reports that new salespeople are offered a salary upon completion of training and are later disappointed to discover that the salary contract requires a quota of sales as a condition of payment. They soon discover no one takes the contract and opt to be a reseller of the rendition fragrances where they earn money from the profits of perfume sales. The only income is from selling knock off perfume door-to-door or in parking lots. Employees are also sometimes encouraged by independent distributors to lie about the products they are selling. Independent salespeople have been in trouble with police for soliciting without a permit.

== Lawsuit ==
In 1999 Scentura Creations, Inc sued Daniel J. Long, a former distributor, for $31,236.44, the cost of perfume which had been delivered to distributors recruited by Long. In 2001, the Illinois Appellate Court ruled that the contract between Scentura and Long was a "pyramid sales scheme", violated the law and was unenforceable under the Consumer Fraud and Deceptive Business Practices Act. The appellate court ruled that Long was not liable for products in the possession of other distributors.
