= Interactive College of Technology =

American for-profit college chain

Coordinates: 33°53′13.5″N 84°18′14.7″W

The Interactive College of Technology (ICT) is a chain of for-profit career colleges headquartered in Chamblee, Georgia (a suburb of Atlanta), United States. The school has campuses in Georgia, Kentucky, and Texas. The school offers certificates, associate degrees, and continuing education and uses computer based training and hands on training as particular modes of instruction.

== History ==
In 1982, the school was established in Athens, Georgia, as Akers Computerized Learning Centers. From 1983 to 1986, five more campuses were added, including a location in Dallas, Texas. In 1986, Interactive Learning Systems acquired Akers Computerized Learning Centers and Elmer Smith became president of ICT. More campuses were added in Houston, Texas and Kentucky. In 1996, the organization was renamed Interactive College of Technology and its main campus moved to Chamblee, Georgia. In 2021, ICT filed federal racketeering charges against Minerva Capital Management for allegedly stealing proprietary information and money from the school. Minerva Capital had initially agreed to buy the schools for $44 million. ICT also announced a strategic relationship with National American University so that ICT students could complete bachelor's degrees at NAU. Elmer Smith has been ICT's only president.

== Offerings ==
ICT offers courses in

- Accounting
- Bilingual administration
- Business information systems
- Business management
- Commercial refrigeration
- English as a second language (ESL)
- Human resource management
- HVAC
- Information technology
- Medical office administration
- Office technology

== Campuses ==
- Chamblee, GA
- Gainesville, GA
- Morrow, GA
- Newport, KY
- Pasadena, TX
- North Houston, TX
- Southwest Houston, TX

== Accreditation ==
ICT is nationally accredited by the Council on Occupational Education (COE).

== Student demographics ==
According to the College Scorecard, the racial makeup of the school is 50 percent black, 20 percent white, 19 percent Hispanic, and 11 percent Asian. Seventy-nine percent of ICT's students take out federal loans.

== Student outcomes ==
According to the College Scorecard, ICT-Chamblee has a 43 percent graduation rate. Median salary after attending ranges from $16,169 (AA in Accounting) to $40,283 (HVAC). Median total debt is between $7,187 and $9.962. Of those taking out student loans, two years after entering repayment, 38 percent were in forbearance, 20 percent were making progress, 17 percent were not making progress, 8 percent were delinquent, 6 percent defaulted, and 5 percent were in deferment.

== See also ==
- For-profit higher education in the United States
