= Chamblee, Georgia =

- City
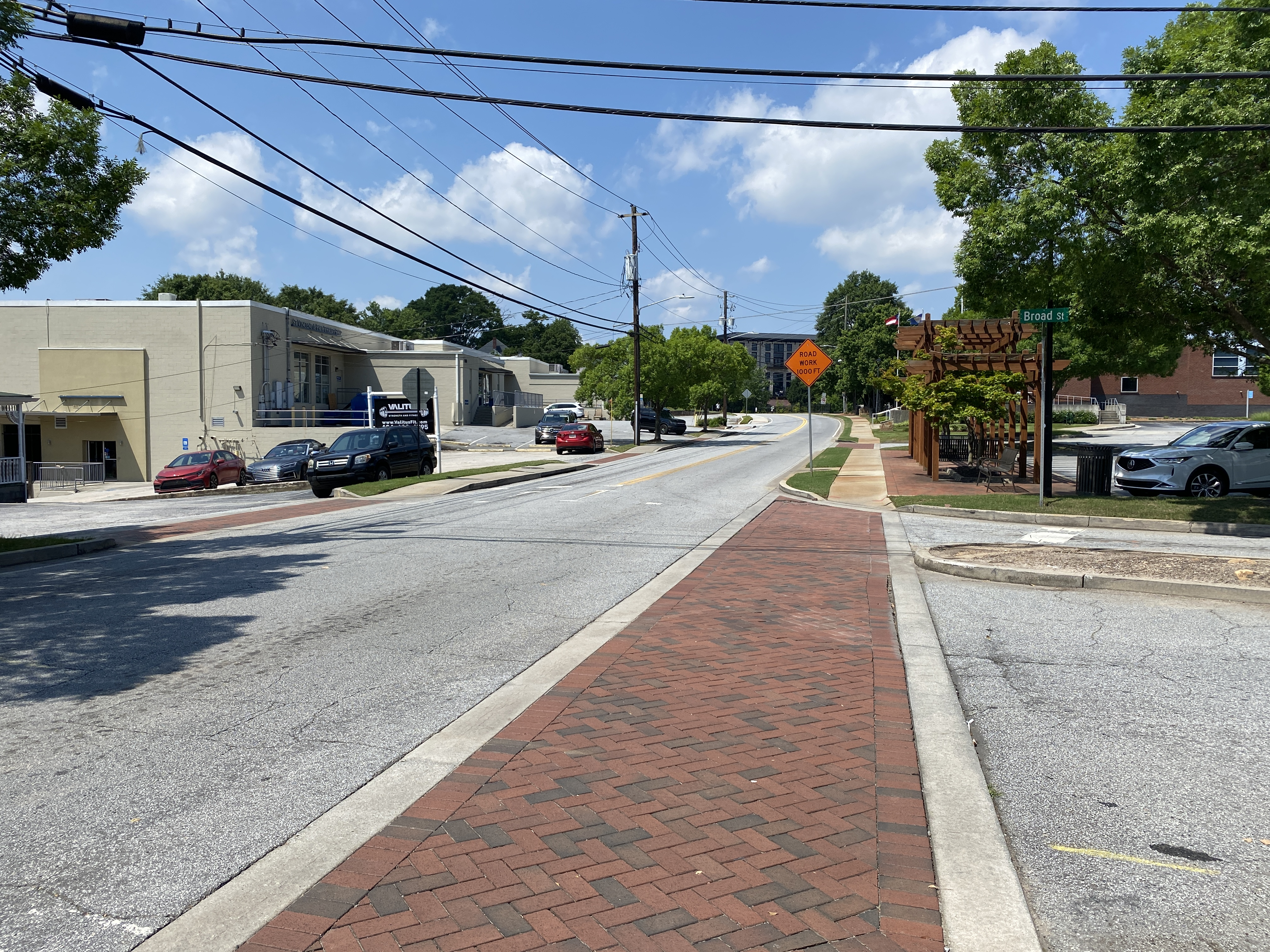
- Downtown Chamblee

- Flag Seal Logo
- Motto: "A City on the Right Track"
- Interactive map of Chamblee, Georgia
- Coordinates: 33°53′15″N 84°18′19″W
- Country: United States
- State: Georgia
- County: DeKalb

Government
  - Mayor: Brian K. Mock

Area
  - Total: 7.70 sq mi (19.94 km^{2})
  - Land: 7.70 sq mi (19.93 km^{2})
  - Water: 0.0077 sq mi (0.02 km^{2})
- Elevation: 1,020 ft (311 m)

Population (2020)
  - Total: 32,251
  - Density: 4,200/sq mi (1,620/km^{2})
- Time zone: UTC-5 (Eastern (EST))
  - Summer (DST): UTC-4 (EDT)
- ZIP codes: 30341, 30366
- Area code: 770
- FIPS code: 13-15172
- GNIS feature ID: 0331371
- Website: chambleega.com

Chamblee (/ˈʃæmbliː/ SHAM-blee) is a city in northern DeKalb County, Georgia, United States, northeast of Atlanta. The population was 30,164 as of the 2020 census.

== History ==
The area that would later become Chamblee was originally dairy farms. During the late nineteenth century, an intersection of two railroads was constructed in Chamblee; one carried passengers from Atlanta to Charlotte, North Carolina, while the other ferried workers and goods back and forth from a factory in Roswell to Atlanta. A settlement known as Roswell Junction emerged at the intersection, and the United States Postal Service decided to establish a post office there. However, feeling the name of the settlement was too similar to nearby Roswell, they randomly selected Chamblee from a list of petitioners for the new post office name. Chamblee was incorporated in 1907.

During World War I and World War II, Chamblee served as the site of U.S. military operations. During World War I, the U.S. operated Camp Gordon, home to 40,000 servicemen. This influx of new people created a building boom in the town. Camp Gordon was closed after the war and then re-opened as Navy Flight Training Center at the advent of World War II.

Immediately after World War II, Chamblee experienced growth in blue-collar industry and residents due to its proximity to the newly opened General Motors plant in neighboring Doraville. Manufacturing plants also located along the newly constructed Peachtree Industrial Boulevard. By the 1980s, much of the city's industrial base had downsized or eroded; in its place sprang up multi-ethnic businesses that catered to the immigrants and refugees moving to Chamblee and Doraville en masse due to the cities' affordable housing. By the time of the 1996 Summer Olympics, Chamblee had emerged as a multi-cultural city inhabited by a large immigrant community.

During the first decade of the 2000s, the city grew as it refined its image, constructing a new city hall in 2002. In 2010, Chamblee annexed an area directly to the northwest that includes Huntley Hills and a resident population of approximately 5,000. It also renamed Peachtree Industrial Boulevard to Peachtree Boulevard, and took steps to revitalize its downtown. In 2012 the city had an annexation proposal that was voted down by a small margin. In November 2013 the city had another annexation proposal that was passed by voters. Following the annexation, the city and neighboring Brookhaven had a dispute in 2014 over which city would annex the Century Center development. The courts gave Century Center to Chamblee.

According to 2020 Census data, Chamblee effectively tripled its population since 2010. It started the decade with roughly 9,800 residents and ended it with more than 30,000, mostly due to two annexations. The only city to gain more residents in that time was Atlanta, and only two Georgia cities — Morgan and Pendergrass — grew at faster rates in the 2010s. City leaders have credited Chamblee's location as a transportation hub, with close proximity to two interstates, a MARTA station and the DeKalb–Peachtree Airport, as a key reason for the city's growth. In the early 2020s Chamblee attracted multiple mixed-use developments and office projects.

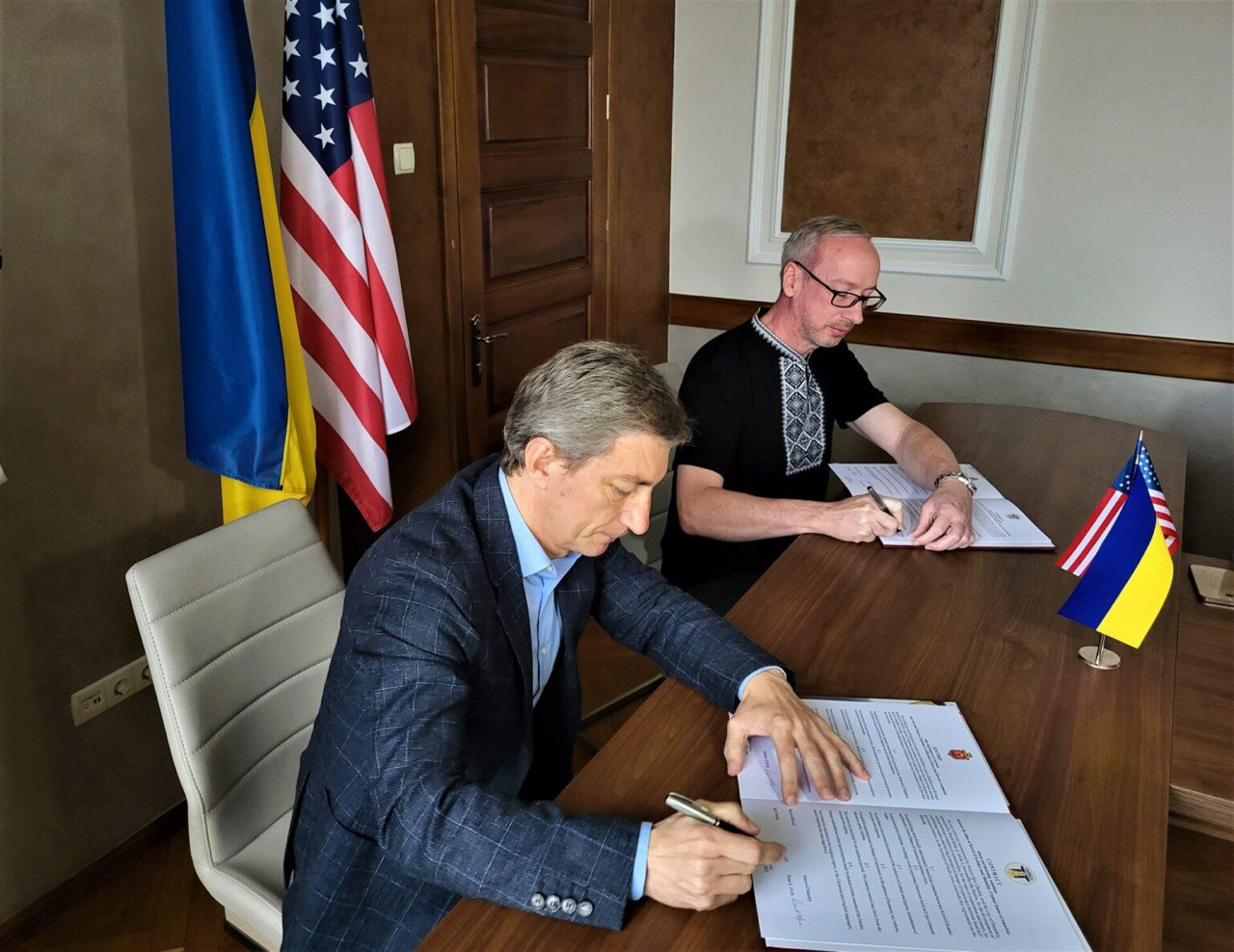
Kovel Mayor Igor Chayka and Chamblee Mayor Brian Mock sign the Sister City Agreement. October 2022, Kovel, Ukraine

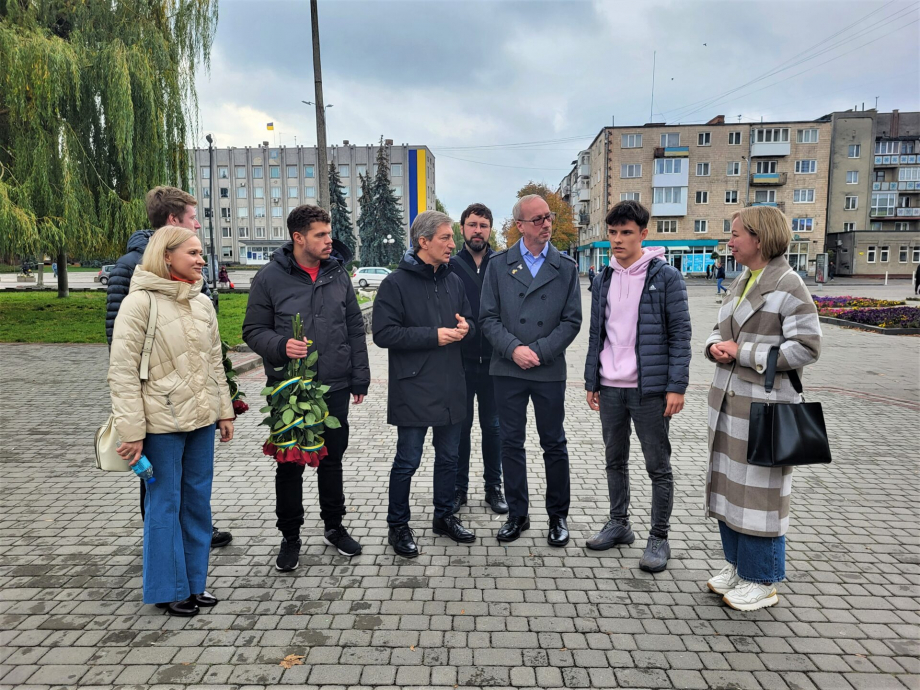
Chamblee Mayor Brian Mock, Kovel Mayor Igor Chaika, the NGO "Big Idea" - Lyudmila Zubareva, Pavlo Oksenyuk, Rafael Crepaldi strolling through Kovel, Ukraine.

Today, Chamblee continues to actively develop, especially in the cultural sphere, thanks to the remarkable multinationality of its inhabitants. In 2022, with the start of the full-scale Russian invasion of Ukraine, Chamblee City Hall was lit up in blue and yellow as a show of support and solidarity with the Ukrainian people,. Also in October 2022, the city signed a Partnership Agreement with the Ukrainian city of Kovel, in the Volyn Oblast. Kovel, Ukraine became Chamblee's first sister city. That same month, Chamblee Mayor Brian Mock personally visited Kovel, Ukraine.

== Geography ==
Chamblee is south of Dunwoody, southwest of Doraville, northeast of Brookhaven, and north of Interstate 85. The city is located at 33°53′15″N 84°18′19″W (33.887552, -84.305326). According to the United States Census Bureau, the city has a total area of 3.1 square miles (8.0 km^{2}), all land.

=== Neighborhoods ===
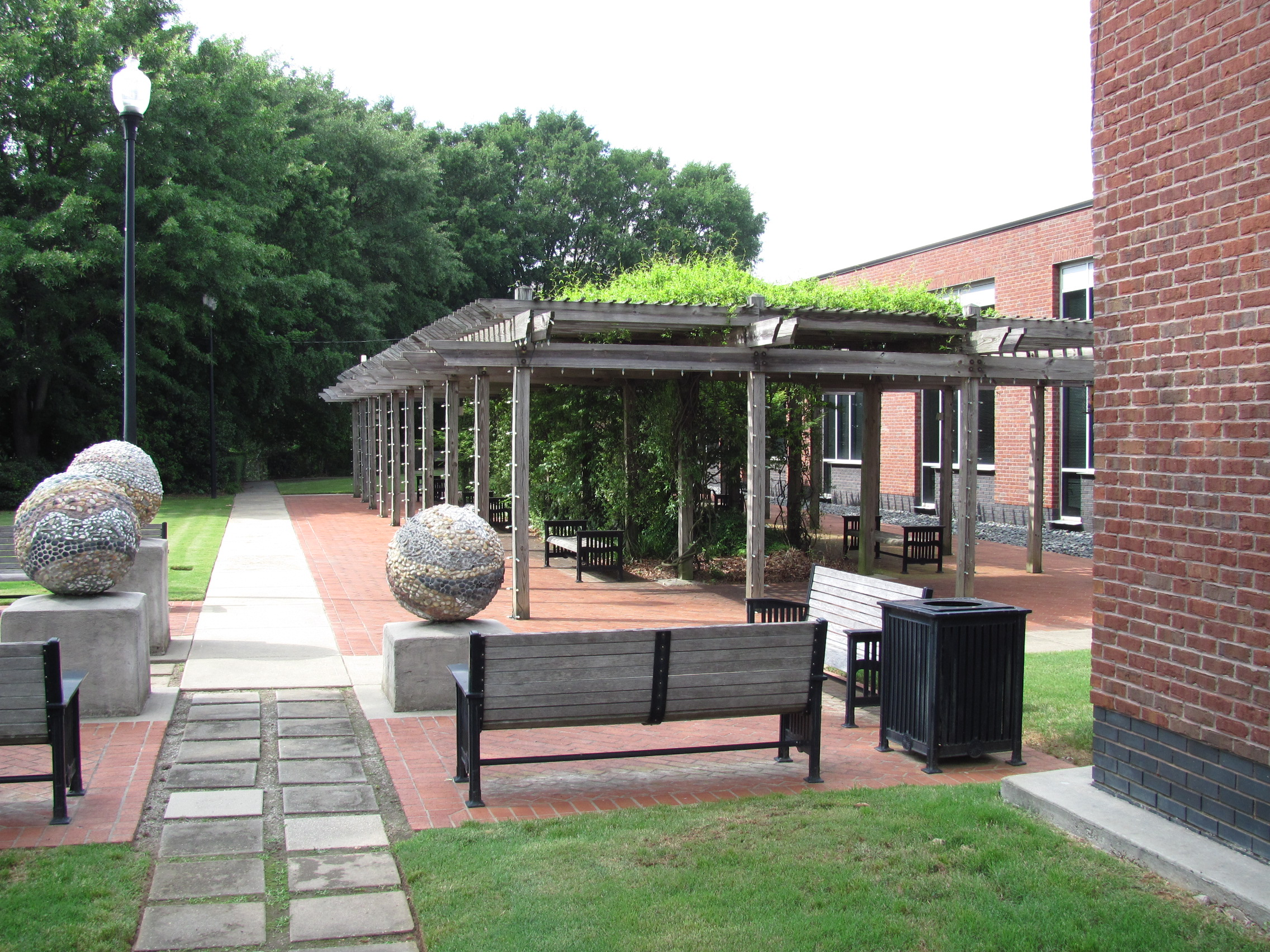
City Hall Park in Downtown Chamblee

- Downtown: Downtown Chamblee has been preserved has an early 20th-century railroad community. Many of the buildings are of historic vintage, and the district has architectural similarities to other similar former railroad communities, such as Decatur and Norcross. Much of the downtown businesses are devoted to Chamblee's antique industry, but that has been changing. The district has attracted significant commercial development since 2000, including lofts and townhomes. The Chamblee MARTA Station and City Hall are both located downtown. Massive economic development including the Town Center Initiative and downtown revitalization projects, have turned Downtown Chamblee into a mecca for foodies. A recently opened brewery and distillery flank downtown Chamblee. A new Chamblee signature event called, Taste of Chamblee, debuted in the mid 20 Teens, showcases the food of the Chamblee area.
- Buford Highway Corridor: The Buford Highway community is home to one of the highest concentration of foreign-born residents in the country, including Mexican, Central American, Chinese, Korean and Vietnamese. The area attracted many Latino workers during the construction boom that preceded the 1996 Olympic Games. Asian business owners were attracted to the stretch of highway by cheap leases and reliable traffic flow. The more than 1,000 immigrant-owned businesses are owned by and patronized by a wide variety of ethnic groups, including Korean, Mexican, Chinese, and Vietnamese, and Indian, Bangladeshi, Central American, Somali, and Ethiopian. The DeKalb County Chamber of Commerce calls the area the "International Corridor."
- DeKalb–Peachtree Airport is the third-largest payer of property taxes in DeKalb County, responsible for an estimated 7,300 jobs, and generates approximately $130 million in income for local residents. The airport is commonly called by its three-letter designation PDK (or PDK Airport). (Note: Each public-use airport has an official Department of Transportation code of letters and/or numbers.) It has averaged 230,000 operations-takeoffs and landings-annually for more than 30 years. PDK is the second-busiest airport in Georgia, behind only Atlanta's Hartsfield-Jackson Airport. A multitude of private and public airlines/pilots fly out of PDK every day. PDK's economic development, the Globe, is home to small businesses invested in the airline trade.
- Sexton Woods: Partially in Chamblee and partially in neighboring city Brookhaven, Sexton Woods is mixed neighborhood of 1950s ranch style homes and more recently new craftsman style infill housing. Sexton Woods is bordered by Chamblee-Dunwoody Road, Harts Mill Road, and Ashford Dunwoody Road. Sexton Woods is also the home of Chamblee Middle School, located on Chamblee-Dunwoody Road until 2006.
- Keswick Village: Adjacent to Sexton Woods, Keswick Village, originally built in 1950, is a neighborhood of renovated original homes and craftsman style infill housing. It is adjacent to Keswick Park, the second largest park in the city.
- Clairmont Park: Residential neighborhoods along Clairmont Road, south of Peachtree Boulevard, near Peachtree Dekalb Airport.
- Huntley Hills: Huntley Hills is a neighborhood established in the early 1960s, though the first house was built on Plantation Lane in 1950. Huntley Hills Elementary School is located in the middle of the neighborhood. Huntley Hills Elementary has a Montessori program added during the 2000–2001 school year and was opened on August 21, 1964. Huntley Hills also has a wide range of special needs programs for children ranging from high to low disorders.
- Beverly Hills/Beverly Woods: Beverly Hills/Beverly Woods is a neighborhood established in the early 1950s in a portion of Chamblee that annexed into the city in 2013. Many houses in this area were built as housing for the Doraville GM plant employees that worked nearby. This neighborhood borders Chamblee-Tucker Road, Shallowford Road, and Beverly Hills Drive. Mostly Mid Century ranch style and split level houses with minimal infill housing as of 2017.

According to Biz Journal, the Atlanta metropolitan area is home to an "... estimated 50,000 Chinese-Americans...." This suburb of Atlanta, Georgia is home to a Chinatown (Chinese: 亚特兰大唐人街; pinyin: Yàtélándà tángrénjiē) that was built in 1988, and is one of the first of the "New Chinatowns" according to the World Journal. Although the city of Atlanta itself does not have a "Chinatown", Chamblee's Chinatown mall is referred to as "Atlanta Chinatown." The neighborhood is part of the Buford Highway international market area and is located near the Chamblee MARTA station and New Peachtree Road. According to the Atlanta Journal-Constitution (AJC), refers to this "Chinatown Mall" as "... Atlanta's place for Chinese culture." According to the official website, "Atlanta Chinatown" is located at 5379 New Peachtree Road. According to the Huffington Post, this Chinatown is an example of a "modern Chinatown", with Albany, Las Vegas, Dallas-Richardson, and North Miami Beach, Florida referenced as similar examples, with regard to the quality of Chinese food. There is an annual Chinese New Year event that is held to celebrate the festival. The author further states that Atlanta's Chinatown is "... unlike many older cities" which exists in an urban setting. Atlanta's Chinatown according to her is "... in a strip mall" setting. Bonnie Tsui further states in her book that the new Chinatowns rely on the Chinatown being built before the Chinese population comes, as she quoted about Las Vegas' Chinatown.

The Atlanta Chinatown market opened on August 8, 1988, and was further expanded in 1996 with an influx of new immigrants from Beijing. According to the previous source, Atlanta's Chinatown has bakeries, restaurants, cosmetics, bookstores, a newspaper office, and many other Chinese-oriented stores.

According to Biz Journal, Atlanta Chinatown was completely redone in the year 2000 by developer Peter Chang, who purchased the old "Chinatown Square Mall". The plans call for "...the 65,000-square-foot mall [to include] a Chinese food court which contains 7 vendors, two dine-in restaurants, several offices, a supermarket, gift shops, a bookstore, jewelers, a video rental store, a beauty salon and other retailers. It will be part of the International Village project, a 375-acre live and work community with a global theme that is being developed by local business leaders, the DeKalb Chamber of Commerce, DeKalb County and the city of Chamblee." According to this article, the plans are to make Atlanta Chinatown a tourist destination rather than it just being another shopping mall.

== Demographics ==
Chamblee, Georgia – Racial and ethnic composition Note: the US Census treats Hispanic/Latino as an ethnic category. This table excludes Latinos from the racial categories and assigns them to a separate category. Hispanics/Latinos may be of any race.
Race / Ethnicity (NH = Non-Hispanic)	Pop 2000	Pop 2010	Pop 2020	% 2000	% 2010	% 2020
White alone (NH)	2,285	2,587	9,421	23.92%	26.15%	31.23%
Black or African American alone (NH)	304	617	4,029	3.18%	6.24%	13.36%
Native American or Alaska Native alone (NH)	3	15	57	0.03%	0.15%	0.19%
Asian alone (NH)	1,329	781	2,590	13.91%	7.90%	8.59%
Native Hawaiian or Pacific Islander alone (NH)	25	3	10	0.26%	0.03%	0.03%
Other race alone (NH)	49	20	190	0.51%	0.20%	0.63%
Mixed race or Multiracial (NH)	173	87	753	1.81%	0.88%	2.50%
Hispanic or Latino (any race)	5,384	5,782	13,114	56.37%	58.45%	43.48%
Total	9,552	9,892	13,114	100.00%	100.00%	100.00%

Historical population
Census	Pop.	Note	%±
1910	129		—
1920	253		96.1%
1930	893		253.0%
1940	1,081		21.1%
1950	3,445		218.7%
1960	6,635		92.6%
1970	9,127		37.6%
1980	7,137		−21.8%
1990	7,668		7.4%
2000	9,552		24.6%
2010	9,892		3.6%
2020	30,164		204.9%
2025 (est.)	32,334	▲	7.2%
U.S. Decennial Census; 2025

=== 2020 census ===
As of the 2020 census, Chamblee had a population of 30,164, with 12,061 households and 5,488 families. The median age was 32.4 years. 22.9% of residents were under the age of 18 and 7.9% were 65 years of age or older. For every 100 females there were 113.7 males, and for every 100 females age 18 and over there were 115.3 males age 18 and over.

100.0% of residents lived in urban areas, while 0.0% lived in rural areas.

Of the 12,061 households, 29.1% had children under the age of 18 living in them. Of all households, 32.9% were married-couple households, 29.5% were households with a male householder and no spouse or partner present, and 29.0% were households with a female householder and no spouse or partner present. About 35.7% of all households were made up of individuals and 6.5% had someone living alone who was 65 years of age or older.

There were 13,198 housing units, of which 8.6% were vacant. The homeowner vacancy rate was 2.4% and the rental vacancy rate was 6.8%.

Racial composition as of the 2020 census
Race	Number	Percent
White	10,555	35.0%
Black or African American	4,164	13.8%
American Indian and Alaska Native	687	2.3%
Asian	2,619	8.7%
Native Hawaiian and Other Pacific Islander	12	0.0%
Some other race	8,542	28.3%
Two or more races	3,585	11.9%
Hispanic or Latino (of any race)	13,114	43.5%

== Government and infrastructure ==
The City of Chamblee operates under a mayor and council-city manager form of government. The Chamblee City Council is composed of a mayor and five council members. The city is divided into four council districts and one at-large district. One council member is elected from each of the four districts and one council member is elected from the city at large. The council members who are elected for the four districts must live in the district that they represent but all five council members are elected by a city-wide vote.

The Council enacts ordinances, establishes policy, adopts the annual budget, and establishes the ad valorem tax rate for each year. The City Manager is responsible for implementing the policies set forth by the council, overseeing all City employees, and managing the day-to-day operations of the city.

As of 2024:

- City Manager: Kristen Gorham
- Mayor: Brian Mock
- Council Members: Elmer Veith, Leslie C. Robson, John Mesa, Paul Stovall, and Mayor Pro Tem Jimmy Furst

The Federal Bureau of Investigation Atlanta Field Office was previously located in Chamblee. Its current location, on the grounds of Mercer University Atlanta Campus, elsewhere in DeKalb County, opened in 2017.

DeKalb County Animal Services has its animal shelter in Chamblee.

== Education ==
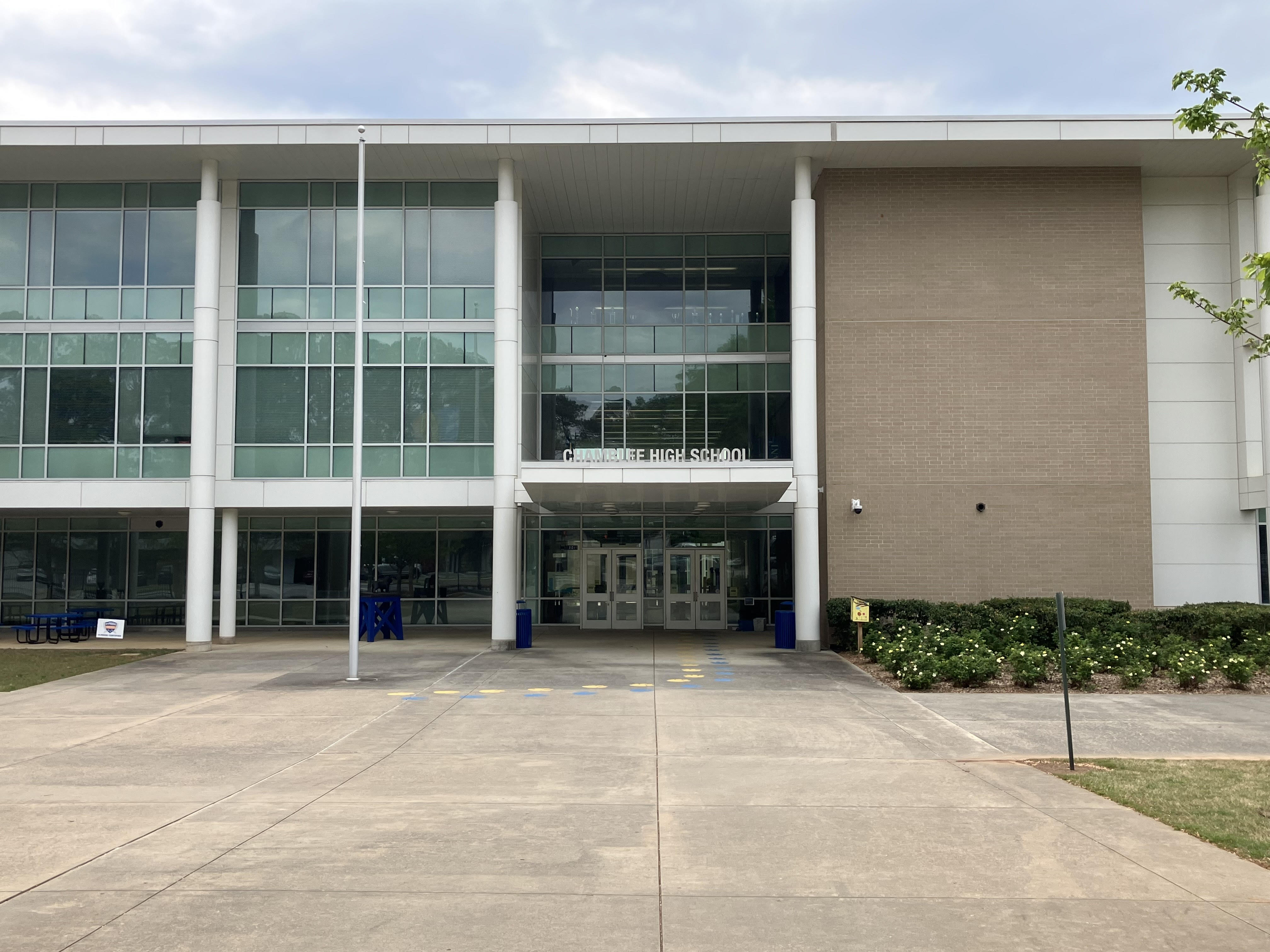
Chamblee High School

=== Primary and secondary schools ===
==== Public schools ====
The DeKalb County School System serves Chamblee.

Elementary

- Huntley Hills Elementary School, a public Montessori school (Chamblee)
- Dresden Elementary School (Chamblee)
- Ashford Park Elementary School (Brookhaven)
- Montclair Elementary School (Brookhaven)
- Montgomery Elementary School (Brookhaven)

Kittredge Magnet School for High Achievers is in Brookhaven.

Middle schools

- Chamblee Middle School
- Sequoyah Middle School (Doraville, serves a section of southern Chamblee)

High schools

- Chamblee High School
- Cross Keys High School (Brookhaven, serves a section of southern Chamblee)

Henderson High School served residents of Chamblee until closed in mid-1990s.

==== Private schools ====
- St. Pius X High School

In the 2005–2006 school year the administration of Sophia Academy, previously in Sandy Springs, sought to establish a new campus and did a capital campaign. Construction began circa 2007. The new campus, in DeKalb County, was annexed into Chamblee. Sophia merged into Notre Dame Academy in Duluth, Georgia effective August 2017.

=== Post-secondary ===
- Interactive College of Technology

=== Public libraries ===
DeKalb County Public Library operates the Chamblee Branch.

=== Tourism, hospitality and development ===
Buford Highway (also Buford Highway Corridor, DeKalb International Corridor, and in the 1990s–2000s as the DeKalb County International Village district), is a community northeast of the city of Atlanta, celebrated for its ethnic diversity and spanning multiple counties including Fulton, DeKalb, and Gwinnett counties in the U.S. state of Georgia. The area generally spans along and on either side of a stretch of Georgia State Route 13 (SR 13) in DeKalb County. It begins just north of Midtown Atlanta, continues northeast through the towns of Brookhaven, Chamblee, Doraville, and Norcross. Most properties along the corridor are in the form of strip malls, retail businesses surrounded by large parking lots, and large apartment complexes. The largest strip malls are the Northeast Plaza, Plaza Fiesta and the Buford Highway Farmers Market complex.

== Transportation ==
=== Major roads and expressways ===
- US 23
- I-85
- SR 141

=== Mass transit ===
GRTA Xpress / RTA commuter buses and MARTA heavy rail subway and buses serve the county.

- Chamblee (MARTA station)

=== Pedestrians and cycling ===
The Chamblee Rail Trail is situated in Chamblee. It offers a short but useful paved pathway through downtown, passing under busy Peachtree Boulevard.

At its northern end, sits the city's largest park, Keswick Park, and just two blocks from the trail's southern end is the Chamblee MARTA Station off Peachtree Road. Natural landscaping and trees keep the route pleasant, while many businesses and restaurants are just steps away.

Work is underway to extend the trail along the former Roswell Railroad spur, bringing the pathway east to Pierce Drive, with long-term plans in the works to link the pathway into the rapidly-developing regional trail network and the Atlanta Beltline. Currently, there are plans for the construction of a multi-use trail, known as the Peachtree Creek Greenway. The goal of the greenway is to provide residents with close-to-home and close-to-work access to bicycle and pedestrian trails, serve transportation and recreation needs, and help encourage quality of life and sustainable economic growth. The trail will connect the cities of Atlanta, Brookhaven, Chamblee and Doraville.

== Twin towns – sister cities ==
Chamblee is twinned with:

- Kovel, Ukraine
