= 1976 in aviation =

This is a list of aviation-related events from 1976.

== Events ==
- The Vatican City Heliport, a helipad in the Vatican Gardens located in the westernmost bastion of the Leonine Wall, opens in Vatican City.

=== January ===
- January 1
  - A bomb explodes in the forward cargo compartment of Middle East Airlines Flight 438, a Boeing 720-023B, at an altitude of 11,300 meters (37,100 feet) over Saudi Arabia. The airliner breaks up and crashes northwest of Al Qaysumah, killing all 81 people on board. Responsibility for the bombing has never been established.
  - Bell Helicopter becomes Bell Helicopter Textron.
- January 3 – Aeroflot Flight 2003, a Tupolev Tu-124V (registration CCCP-45037) enters clouds immediately after takeoff from Vnukovo Airport in Moscow. Its artificial horizons fail, and the crew loses its spatial orientation, banking 95 degrees and diving the airliner into the ground 7 kilometers (4.3 miles) west of the airport at a rate of descent of 50 meters (160 feet) per second. The crash kills all 61 people on board and one person in a house on the ground.
- January 5 – Two hijackers commandeer Japan Air Lines Flight 768, a Douglas DC-8 with 223 people on board during a flight from Manila, the Philippines, to Tokyo, Japan. The airliner returns to Manila International Airport, where the hijackers surrender.
- January 15 – A Taxi Aéreo El Venado Douglas C-54A-5-DC Skymaster (registration HK-172) crashes into a cloud-covered mountain peak 30 kilometers (19 miles) east of Chipaque, Colombia. The airliner strikes the mountain at an altitude of 3,540 meters (11,610 feet) and falls 800 meters (2,600 feet) into a canyon, killing all 13 people on board.
- January 20 – TAME Hawker Siddeley HS 748-246 Srs. 2A (registration HC-AUE/683), flying at an altitude of 10,000 feet (3,000 meters), loses altitude over mountainous terrain, strikes trees with its wing, and crashes into the side of a mountain near Loja, Ecuador, killing 34 of the 42 people on board.
- January 21
  - A CAAC Airlines Antonov An-24 (registration B-492) crashes on approach to Changsha Huanghua International Airport in Changsha in the People's Republic of China, killing all 40 people on board.
  - The world's first supersonic air passenger service begins, when the Concorde begins commercial passenger flights for both Air France and British Airways. Air France makes its first Concorde flight from Charles de Gaulle Airport in Paris to Rio de Janeiro–Galeão International Airport in Rio de Janeiro, Brazil with a stop at Dakar, Senegal, initiating a twice-weekly Paris-Rio de Janeiro service that will continue until 1982.
  - Angola formally establishes the People's Air Force of Angola.

=== February ===
- February 9 – Aeroflot Flight 3739, a Tupolev Tu-104A (registration CCCP-42327), banks hards to the right on takeoff from Irkutsk Airport in Irkutsk in the Soviet Union's Russian Soviet Federated Socialist Republic and crashes, killing 24 of the 115 people on board.
- February 29 – A Colombian man hijacks an Aerolineas Centrales de Colombia (ACES) Saunders ST-27 (registration HK-1286) shortly after it arrives at Medellín, Colombia, after a domestic flight from Turbo and forces it to fly to Chigorodó, Colombia, with 18 people on board. At Chigorodó, he allows eight passengers to disembark, then orders the airliner to return to Medellín, where police storm the plane during the evening and kill him.

=== March ===
- March 2 – A TAM – Transporte Aéreo Militar IAI Arava 201 (registration TAM-76) on a military flight crashes in the jungle in southeastern Bolivia, killing 19 of the 22 people on board. The plane's wreckage is not found until March 4.
- March 6 – Aeroflot Flight 909, an Ilyusin Il-18V (registration CCCP-75408), suffers an electrical failure that knocks out its compass system, two main gyroscopes, and autopilot while it is flying at night at an altitude of 26,000 feet (7,900 meters). The crew loses its spatial awareness and loses control of the airliner, which crashes near Verkhnyaya Khava in the Soviet Union's Russian Soviet Federated Socialist Republic, killing all 111 people on board.
- March 17 - A Japan Air Lines Boeing 747 makes the first non-stop flight from Tokyo to New York, taking 11½ hours for the 10,139-kilometer (6,300-mile) journey.

=== April ===
- April 5 – Howard Hughes dies aboard a Learjet, aged 70.
- April 7 – Three men hijack a Philippine Air Lines BAC One-Eleven during a domestic flight in the Philippines from Cagayan de Oro to Mactan, demanding US$300,000 and the release of a large number of prisoners. The airliner diverts to Manila, where the hijackers receive the money and exchange all the passengers for a new set of hostages. Over the next six days, the hijackers force the plane to fly to Kota Kinabalu and Kuala Lumpur in Malaysia and to Bangkok, Thailand. At Bangkok, Philippine Air Lines provides the hijackers with a Douglas DC-8. The hijackers transfer to the DC-8, bringing 12 Philippine Air Lines employees with them as hostages, and force it to fly to Karachi, Pakistan, and then on to Benghazi, Libya, where the hijackers release the hostages and request political asylum.
- April 14 – The right wing of the Avro 748-105 Srs. 1 Ciudad de Corrientes (registration LV-HHB), operated by YPF, fails due to metal fatigue at an altitude of about 4,000 feet (1,200 meters) during a staff transfer flight for the company, followed by separation of the right tailplane. The rest of the plane corkscrews and crashes 35 kilometers (22 miles) north of Cutral Có, Argentina, killing all 34 people on board.
- April 24 – A 22-year-old male passenger board an Avianca Boeing 727-59 (registration HK-1400) draws a revolver and hijacks the airliner shortly after it takes off from Pereira, Colombia, for a domestic flight to Bogotá. The plane lands at Bogotá, and he surrenders to the authorities there that evening.
- April 27 – American Airlines Flight 625, a Boeing 727, crashes on approach to St. Thomas in the United States Virgin Islands, killing 37 of the 88 people on board.
- April 30 – After a Turkish Airlines Douglas DC-10-10 with 264 people on board takes off from Paris′s Orly Airport for a flight to Istanbul, Turkey, a Turkish migrant worker who had lost his job and was being expelled from France and sent home to Turkey hijacks the plane, demanding to be flown to Marseille or Lyon, France. The airliner returns to Orly Airport, where the hijacker surrenders two-and-a-half hours later.

=== May ===
- Uganda Airlines is founded. It will begin flight operations in 1977.
- May 1–3
  - Carrying 98 passengers, the Pan American World Airways Boeing 747SP-21 Clipper Liberty Bell (registration N533PA) makes an around-the-world flight during which it sets several world records. Departing John F. Kennedy International Airport in New York City on May 1, it flies eastward nonstop to Indira Gandhi International Airport in New Delhi, India, arriving on May 2 after flying 13,005.1 kilometers (8,081.0 miles) at an average speed of 869.63 kilometers per hour (540.363 miles per hour), a record average speed for a commercial aircraft flying the route. It then flies nonstop to Tokyo International Airport in Tokyo, Japan, arriving on May 3 after covering 12,132.8 kilometers (7,539.0 miles) at an average speed of 421.20 kilometers per hour (261.722 miles per hour), a record average speed for a commercial aircraft flying the route. It then flies its final leg, returning to John F. Kennedy International Airport with a nonstop flight of 12,097.4 kilometers (7,517.0 miles) at an average speed of 912.50 kilometers per hour (567.001 miles per hour), a record speed for a commercial aircraft on that route. The flight takes 46 hours 1 second, of which 39 hours 25 minutes 53 seconds are in the air, and covers 37,235.4 kilometers (23,137.0 miles) at an average speed of 809.24 kilometers per hour (502.838 miles per hour), a record average speed for an aircraft on an eastward around-the-world flight.
- May 3 – A de Havilland Canada DHC-6 Twin Otter 300 (registration C-GDHA) operated by de Havilland Canada suffers the failure of its No. 2 engine on takeoff from Monze Airport in Monze, Zambia, and crashes 1 kilometer (0.62 miles) beyond the end of the runway, killing all 11 people on board.
- May 9 – An Imperial Iranian Air Force Boeing 747-131F cargo plane operating as Flight 48 is struck by lightning near Madrid, Spain, causing the fuel tank in its left wing to explode and the wing to separate. The aircraft crashes in farmland, killing all 17 people on board.
- May 11 – British Airways Flight 888, a Boeing 747-100 was on the finals at the old Kuala Lumpur Airport when it flew below the normal flight path, hitting trees 2.2 nautical miles before the runway threshold. On landing, inspection of the aircraft revealed damage on the main landing gear; strike marks on the fuselage and engine intakes; and evidence of debris ingestion on the two left-side engines.
- May 15 – Flying at its cruising altitude of 5,700 meters (18,700 feet) during a domestic flight in the Soviet Union from Vinnitsa to Moscow, Aeroflot Flight 1802, an Antonov An-24V (registration CCCP-46534), experiences a sudden, sharp rudder deflection. It goes into a spin and crashes 15 kilometers (9.3 miles) southeast of Chernigov in the Ukrainian Soviet Socialist Republic, killing all 52 people on board.
- May 21–23 – Six Muslim rebels hijack Philippine Air Lines Flight 116, a BAC One-Eleven 527FK (registration RP-C1161), during a domestic flight in the Philippines from Davao City to Manila with 81 other people on board. They force it to fly to Zamboanga Airport in Zamboanga City, where they demand $375,000 and a plane to fly them to Libya. When Filipino security forces storm the plane on May 23, a gun battle breaks out and the hijackers detonate hand grenades. Three hijackers and 10 passengers die, and the three surviving hijackers are arrested and later sentenced to death.
- May 24 – Air France and British Airways simultaneously initiate transatlantic Concorde service with flights to Washington Dulles International Airport in Virginia.

=== June ===
- June 1 – Aeroflot Flight 418, a Tupolev Tu-154M, crashes into a mountain near Bioko, Equatorial Guinea, killing all 46 people on board.
- June 4 – Air Manila International Flight 702, a Lockheed L-188A Electra (registration RP-C1061), crashes on takeoff from Naval Air Station Agana on Guam, striking an automobile as it slides across a highway. The crash kills all 45 people on board the plane and the driver of the car and seriously injures a woman and her son, who are burned and struck by debris while standing outside their residence.
- June 6 – A Sabah Air GAF Nomad crashes at Kota Kinabalu, Malaysia, while on approach to Kota Kinabalu International Airport, killing all 11 people on board. Among the dead are eight Sabah officials, including Chief Minister Tun Fuad Stephens.
- June 27 – Two Palestinians of the Popular Front for the Liberation of Palestine – External Operations (PFLP-EO) and two West Germans – Wilfried Böse and Brigitte Kuhlmann – from the Revolutionary Cells group hijack Air France Flight 139, an Airbus A300B4-203 with 256 other people on board on a flight from Athens, Greece, to Paris, France, and force it to fly to Benghazi, Libya, where they release one passenger. On June 28, they force the plane to fly on to Entebbe International Airport near Entebbe in Uganda, where at least four more hijackers join them. Demanding the release of various prisoners in Israel, Kenya, France, Switzerland, and West Germany, they release 149 more hostages over the next week, but continue to hold 106 hostages in the transit hall at the airport.

=== July ===
- July 1
  - Clive Canning arrives in the United Kingdom, having flown from Australia in a Thorp T-18 homebuilt aircraft.
  - The National Air and Space Museum opens in Washington, D.C.
- July 3 – A Burmese Air Force Douglas C-47 Skytrain crashes and burns near Daiku, Burma, killing all 17 people on board.
- July 4 – In Operation Entebbe, three Israeli Air Force C-130 Hercules aircraft carrying about 100 Israeli commandos land at Entebbe International Airport at Entebbe, Uganda, to rescue the 106 passengers of Air France Flight 139 still being held hostage in a transit hall there by Palestinian and West German hijackers. The Israelis kill seven hijackers and between 33 and 45 Ugandan soldiers, destroy 11 Ugandan Air Force MiG-17 fighters on the ground, and rescue 102 of the hostages; one Israeli commando is killed, three hostages die during an Israeli exchange of gunfire with the hijackers, and in retaliation for the raid Ugandan government forces murder the final hostage, who is being held at a hospital.
- July 6 – A lone hijacker commandeers a Libyan Arab Airlines Boeing 727 during a domestic flight in Libya from Tripoli to Benghazi and forces it to fly to Palma de Mallorca on Mallorca in Spain's Balearic Islands, where the hijacker surrenders to the authorities.
- July 28 – ČSA Flight 001, an Ilyushin Il-18B, crashes into Zlaté Piesky lake after its crew inadvertently engages thrust reversal while attempting to land at M. R. Štefánik Airport in Bratislava, Czechoslovakia, killing 76 of the 79 people on board and injuring all three survivors.
- July 30 – Prime Minister of Madagascar Joel Rakotomalala dies along with all three other people on board in the crash of a helicopter into the sea off Madagascar.

=== August ===
- August 1 – After his 1973 round-the-world attempt was aborted by bad weather between Hokkaidō and the Aleutian Islands, Don Taylor of California departs Oshkosh, Wisconsin, in the United States, flying eastbound in his Thorp T-18, beginning an attempt to become the first person to fly around the world in a home-built aircraft. He will complete his flight on October 1.
- August 3 – Jerry Litton, a member of the United States House of Representatives representing Missouri's 6th Congressional District, and all five other people – Litton's wife, their two children, the pilot, and the pilot's son – aboard a Beechcraft Model 58 Baron die when the plane suffers a broken crankshaft in its left engine and crashes on takeoff at Chillicothe Municipal Airport at Chillicothe, Missouri.
- August 6 – Midway Airlines is founded. It will begin flight operations in October 1979.
- August 9 – A Spanish Air Force Douglas C-54E-15-DO Skymaster carrying military officers and their family members to the Canary Islands crashes in a hilly, wooded area near Vejer de la Frontera, Spain, and burns, killing 12 of the 32 people on board.
- August 15 – SAETA Flight 232, a Vickers Viscount 785D, crashes into Ecuador′s highest mountain, the stratovolcano Chimborazo, at an altitude of 5,400 meters (17,700 feet), killing all 59 people on board. Its wreckage and the bodies of its crew and passengers will not be discovered until October 17, 2002.
- August 23 – Three armed passengers hijack an Egyptair Boeing 737-266 with 101 people on board during a domestic flight in Egypt from Cairo to Luxor. They demand to be flown to Libya, but the plane is nearing Luxor at the time of the hijacking and the pilot tells them that it must land there because it does not have enough fuel to fly to Libya. After the airliner lands at Luxor, the hijackers demand the releaseof five prisoners who had plotted the assassinations of dissident Libyan and Yemeni political leaders. Late in the afternoon, Egyptian Army commandos storm the plane at Luxor and arrest the hijackers.
- August 28
  - A Vietnamese man hijacks an Air France Sud Aviation SE-210 Caravelle III with 20 people on board as it is about to depart Ho Chi Minh City, Vietnam, for a flight to Bangkok, Thailand. The plane flies to Bangkok, where he releases the passengers and crew, then detonates two hand grenades as security forces approach the airliner to arrest him. The explosions kill him and damage the airliner beyond repair.
  - With its weather radar out of order, a United States Air Force Lockheed C-141A-LM Starlifter enters a very strong line of thunderstorms over Peterborough, England. It apparently encounters a 100-mile-per-hour (161 km/h) vertical downdraft which causes its right wing, its vertical stabilizer, and all four of its engines to fail. It crashes, killing all 18 people on board.
  - Attempting a go-around at Kangerlussuaq Airport in Kangerlussuaq, Greenland, a U.S. Air Force Lockheed C-141A-LM Starlifter stalls, crashes, catches fire, and disintegrates, killing 23 of the 27 people on board.

=== September ===
- IRI-Finmeccanica buys out Fiat to become sole owner of Aeritalia.
- September 3 – On approach to Lajes Field on Terceira Island in the Azores in heavy rain and hurricane-force winds associated with Hurricane Emmy after two previous failed landing attempts, a Venezuelan Air Force Lockheed C-130H Hercules crashes into a hill 1.6 kilometers (0.99 miles) short of the runway, killing all 68 people on board. Among the dead are 58 members of the Central University of Venezuela choir bound for Barcelona, Spain. At the time, it is the deadliest aviation accident in the history of Portugal.
- September 4
  - Three hijackers commandeer KLM Flight 366 – a Douglas DC-9-33RC (registration PH-DNM) with 84 people on board flying from Nice, France, to Amsterdam, the Netherlands – and demand the release of prisoners. They force the plane to fly to Larnaca, Cyprus, where they surrender the next day.
  - An Austin Airways de Havilland Canada DHC-3 Otter (registration CF-MIT) strikes power cables and crashes at Fraserdale, Ontario, Canada, killing all 10 people on board.
- September 6 – Viktor Belenko of the Soviet Air Defense Forces defects to the West, landing his Mikoyan-Gurevich MiG-25 (NATO reporting name "Foxbat") at Hakodate Airport in Hakodate, Japan. For the first time, Western experts get a close look at a MiG-25.
- September 9 – Aeroflot Flight 31, a Yakovlev Yak-40 (registration CCCP-87772) with 18 people on board, collides head-on with Aeroflot Flight 7957, an Antonov An-24RV (registration CCCP-46518) carrying 46 people, over the Black Sea 37 kilometers (23 miles) south of Anapa in the Soviet Union's Russian Soviet Federated Socialist Republic. Both aircraft crash, killing everyone on board, and sink in waters 1,500 to 1,600 feet (460 to 490 meters) deep.
- September 10
  - Six hijackers take control of an Air India Boeing 737-200 with 83 people on board during a domestic flight in India from Delhi to Bombay. They force it to fly to Lahore, Pakistan.
  - In the worst mid-air collision disaster up to this time, all 176 people aboard the two aircraft die when a British Airways Hawker Siddeley Trident and an Inex Adria Douglas DC-9 collide over Zagreb, Yugoslavia. This mid air collision was the deadliest until 1996.
  - Five members of the Croatian National Resistance hijack Trans World Airways Flight 355, a Boeing 727 with 36 other passengers on board flying from LaGuardia Airport in New York City to O'Hare International Airport in Chicago, Illinois, and divert it to land at Mirabel International Airport in Montreal, Quebec, Canada. They then force it to fly to Gander, Newfoundland (now Newfoundland and Labrador), where they release 35 of the passengers. From there, they order the plane flown to Reykjavík, Iceland, and finally to Paris, France, where they release their remaining hostages and surrender.
- September 14 – A U.S. Navy Grumman F-14 Tomcat rolls off the deck of the aircraft carrier USS John F. Kennedy (CV-67) and sinks in international waters. A major salvage operation is launched to retrieve the fighter lest it fall into Soviet hands.
- September 18 – The legendary test pilot Albert Boyd dies.
- September 19 – During a night approach to a landing at Antalya Airport in Antalya, Turkey, with the captain out of the cockpit, the first officer of Turkish Airlines Boeing 727-2F2 Antalya, operating as Flight 452, mistakes a long straight highway filled with truck traffic north of Isparta for the runway at Antalya, which is 97 km (60 mi) away to the south-southeast. The captain reenters the cockpit and attempts an emergency climb from an altitude of 150 m (490 ft), but the plane crashes into a hill, killing all 154 people on board. It remains the deadliest aviation accident on Turkish soil.
- September 26
  - The pilot and sole occupant of a stolen Aeroflot Antonov An-2 crashes the aircraft into an apartment complex where his ex-wife lives in Novosibirsk in the Soviet Union's Russian Soviet Federated Socialist Republic, killing himself and 11 people on the ground. His ex-wife survives.
  - On approach to Ingalls Field in Hot Springs, Virginia, a Grumman G-1159 Gulfstream II operated by Johnson & Johnson crashes into terrain 500 feet (150 meters) below the airport's 3,766-foot (1,148-meter) altitude, killing all 11 people on board.
  - A United States Air Force Boeing KC-135A-BN Stratotanker experiences a probable cabin pressurization problem and crash-lands in rugged terrain 20 kilometers (12 miles) southwest of Alpena, Michigan, breaking up and coming to rest in a swamp. The crash kills 15 of the 20 people on board.

=== October ===
- October 1 – Don Taylor of California successfully completes a circumnavigation of the world eastbound in his Thorp T-18, arriving at his starting point in Oshkosh, Wisconsin, in the United States two months after his departure on August 1. He becomes the first person to fly around the world in a home-built aircraft.
- October 6 – Two time bombs planted by members of the Cuban anti-Castro Coordination of United Revolutionary Organizations group explode aboard Cubana Flight 455, a McDonnell Douglas DC-8, at 18,000 feet (5,500 m) shortly after takeoff from Seawell Airport at Bridgetown, Barbados, starting an uncontrollable fire that incapacitates the flight crew. The plane crashes into the Atlantic Ocean, killing all 78 people on board, including the members of the Cuban national fencing team. It is the deadliest terrorist attack on an airliner in the history of the Western Hemisphere at the time.
- October 12 – A fire breaks out in the area of the No. 2 engine of Indian Airlines Flight 171, a Sud Aviation SE-210 Caravelle VIN (registration VT-DWN), when the engine fails after takeoff from Santacruz Airport in Bombay, India. As the crew attempts to return to the airport, the fire causes a loss of hydraulic pressure, and the crew loses control of the airliner. The Caravelle dives into the ground 1,000 feet (300 meters) short of the runway from an altitude of 300 feet (91 meters), killing all 95 people on board. It is the second-deadliest aviation accident in Indian history at the time.
- October 13 – After its fatigued crew selects insufficient thrust for takeoff from El Trompillo Airport in Santa Cruz de la Sierra, Bolivia, a Lloyd Aéreo Boliviano Boeing 707-131F cargo aircraft N730JP (registration N730JP) has an extra-long takeoff roll and then reaches an altitude of only 6 meters (20 feet) before striking trees and crashing into a football (soccer) field 560 meters (1,840 feet) beyond the runway. The crash kills the entire crew of three and 88 people on the ground. It remains the deadliest plane crash in Bolivian history.
- October 17 – United States Air Force Colonel Ralph S. Parr retires from military service as one of the most decorated Air Force officers in history. Seeing action in World War II, the Korean War (during which he scores ten kills), and the Vietnam War, he has received over 60 decorations, including a Silver Star, a Bronze Star Medal, the Air Force Cross, 10 Distinguished Flying Crosses, and 41 Air Medals.
- October 25 – After the No. 1 engine of a Taxi Aéreo El Venado Douglas C-47-DL Skytrain (registration HK-149) fails shortly after takeoff from El Yopal Airport in Yopal, Colombia, its crew attempts to return to the airport, but the airliner noses down, crashes, and burns 6.5 kilometers (4.0 miles) from the airport, killing all 36 people on board.
- October 28 – A hijacker commandeers a CSA Czech Airlines Ilyushin Il-18 with 105 people on board during a domestic flight in Czechoslovakia from Prague to Bratislava and forces it to fly to Munich, West Germany, where the hijacker surrenders.

=== November ===
- November 4
  - Attempting to begin a go-around after overshooting its approach at Syamsudin Noor Airport in Banjarmasin, Indonesia, a Bali International Air Service Fokker F27 Friendship 100 (registration PK-KFR), crashes short of the runway, killing 29 of the 38 people on board.
  - A hijacker commandeers a LOT Polish Airlines Tupolev Tu-134A during a flight from Copenhagen, Denmark, to Warsaw, Poland, and forces it to fly to Vienna, Austria, where the hijacker surrenders.
- November 23 – On approach to Kozani National Airport "Filippos" in Kozani, Greece, Olympic Airways Flight 830, the NAMC YS-11A-500 Isle of Milos (registration SX-BBR), crashes into a cloud-covered mountain 19 kilometers (12 miles) southeast of the airport at an altitude of 1,300 meters (4,300 feet), killing all 50 people on board. It is the second-deadliest accident involving a YS-11 and at the time it is the second-deadliest aviation accident in Greek history.
- November 28 – After an artificial horizon failure in bad weather causes its crew to lose spatial awareness and bank too steeply shortly after takeoff from Sheremetyevo Airport in Moscow, an Aeroflot Tupolev Tu-104B (registration CCCP-42471) crashes 29 kilometers (18 miles) from the airport, killing all 72 people on board.

=== December ===
- Trans International Airlines purchases Saturn Airways and merges Saturn's operations into its own.
- December 17 – On a night approach in bad weather to Zhulhyany Airport in Kyiv in the Soviet Union's Ukrainian Soviet Socialist Republic, an Aeroflot Antonov An-24 (registration CCCP-46722) strikes a concrete obstruction short of the runway and crashes into a railway embankment 1 kilometer (0.62 miles) from the airport, killing all 48 of the 55 people on board.
- December 19 – A Piper Cherokee buzzes Memorial Stadium in Baltimore, Maryland, minutes after the conclusion of a National Football League playoff game between the Baltimore Colts and the Pittsburgh Steelers and crashes into the stadium's upper deck. There are no serious injuries, and the pilot is arrested for violating air safety regulations.
- December 21 – A lone hijacker commandeers a United Air Lines Douglas DC-8 with three people on board parked at San Francisco International Airport in South San Francisco, California, and demands to be flown to the United States East Coast, but then surrenders.
- December 25 – EgyptAir Flight 864, a Boeing 707-366C, crashes in an industrial complex in Bangkok, Thailand, while on approach to land at Bangkok's Don Mueang International Airport, killing all 52 people on board and 19 people on the ground.
- December 30 – About seven minutes after takeoff from Trujillo Airport in Trujillo, Peru, a Faucett Perú Douglas C-54A-1-DO Skymaster (registration OB-R-247) crashes into Cerro Pintado 27 kilometers (17 miles) north of the airport, killing all 24 people on board.

== First flights ==
=== February ===
- February 4 - Rolladen-Schneider LS3

=== May ===
- May 19 - Utva 75

=== June ===
- June 16 - Practavia Sprite

=== July ===
- July 3 – Piaggio P.166D
- July 30 - HAL Kiran Mk II U738

=== August ===
- August 9 - Boeing YC-14 72-1873
- August 12 - Aermacchi MB-339 I-NOVE
- August 13 - Bell 222 N9988K
- August 13 - Lucas L5
- August 23 - Cranfield A1
- August 27 - PZL-Mielec M-18 Dromader

=== September ===
- September 18 - Schempp-Hirth Mini-Nimbus

=== October ===
- October 10 - Embraer EMB 121 Xingu PP-ZXI
- October 12 - Sikorsky S-72 NASA545

=== November ===
- November 7 - Dassault Falcon 50 F-WAMD

=== December ===
- December 1 - Ahrens AR 404 N404AR
- December 8 - Pre-production single-seat General Dynamics F-16 Fighting Falcon
- December 16 - Shuttle Carrier Aircraft NASA905
- December 21 - Ryson ST-100 Cloudster
- December 22 - Ilyushin Il-86 SSSR-86000
- December 31 --Grob G103 Twin Astir

== Entered service ==
- Bell OH-58B with the Austrian Air Force

=== January ===
- January 21 – Concorde, with British Airways and Air France

=== June ===
- Beechcraft Baron Model 58TC

=== August ===
- August 24 – Shorts 330 with Time Air

=== November ===
- Hawker Siddeley Hawk T1 with RAF

== Deadliest crash ==
The deadliest crash of this year was the 1976 Zagreb mid-air collision, when an Inex-Adria Aviopromet McDonnell Douglas DC-9 struck a British Airways Hawker Siddeley Trident near Vrbovec, SFR Yugoslavia, on 10 September, killing all 176 people on board both aircraft. At the time it was the deadliest mid-air collision in aviation history. The deadliest single-aircraft accident took place nine days later, when on 19 September Turkish Airlines Flight 452, a Boeing 727, crashed into mountainous terrain near Isparta, Turkey, killing all 154 people on board.
