= Melmoth =

Melmoth may refer to:

- Garrison Melmoth, a homebuilt aircraft designed by Peter Garrison
- Garrison Melmoth 2, a follow-up design to the Garrison Melmoth
- Melmoth (comics), a graphic novel by Dave Sim featuring Cerebus the Aardvark
- Melmoth the Wanderer, a gothic novel written by Charles Robert Maturin
- Melmoth, a novel written by Sarah Perry
- Melmoth the Wanderer is the name of Humbert Humbert's car in Vladimir Nabokov's Lolita
- Sebastian Melmoth, a pseudonym used later in life by writer Oscar Wilde
- Melmoth, KwaZulu-Natal, a small town in Zululand, South Africa
- William Melmoth, English devotional writer and lawyer
