= John Strachan (disambiguation) =

John Strachan (1778–1867) was the Anglican bishop of Toronto, Canada.

John Strachan may also refer to:

- Sir John Strachan, 5th Baronet (died 1777), captain in the Royal Navy
- John Strachan (explorer) (1846–1922), Scottish-born Australian explorer of New Guinea
- John Strachan (linguist) (1862–1907), scholar of Celtic languages at the University of Manchester
- John Strachan (bishop of Rangoon) (died 1906), Anglican bishop in India
- John Strachan (singer) (1875–1958), Scottish singer
- John Strachan (bishop of Brechin) (died 1810), Scottish Episcopal bishop
- John Strachan (politician) (1834–?), Scottish-born Wisconsin politician
- John Strachan (professor) (born 1961), literary critic, historian and poet
- John Strachan (tennis) (1895–1970), American tennis player
- John Strachan (cricketer) (1896–1988), English cricketer and British Army officer
