= Charles Lamb Society =

British literary society and charity

The Charles Lamb Society (CLS) celebrates and contributes to scholarship on the life and work of Charles Lamb (1775-1834) and Mary Lamb (1764-1847). Charles Lamb was an English essayist and poet whose literary circle included important figures in Romanticism such as Samuel Taylor Coleridge, William Hazlitt, Robert Southey, William Wordsworth, and Dorothy Wordsworth. He is best known for his Essays of Elia (1823) and for Tales from Shakespeare (1807) which he co-wrote with his sister, Mary.

The Society is currently co-chaired by Felicity James (University of Leicester) and John Strachan (Bath Spa University). Its president is Duncan Wu (Georgetown University, Washington). Membership is open to all and there is a significant discount on subscriptions for postgraduate students and early career scholars. Membership includes two print issues of the Charles Lamb Bulletin each year.

== Origins ==
In the autumn of 1934, the Bookman Circle visited Chiswick, and discussed the idea of forming a society dedicated to Charles Lamb. It would formalise an earlier informal dining club, The Elian, which had begun at Ye Old Cheshire Cheese on Fleet Street in 1925, and gone on to include talks attended by writers of the day including G. K. Chesterton, Siegfried Sassoon, and Edmund Blunden, and the retired politician Augustine Birrell. ('The Elian' because 'Elia' is the pen name Lamb used when writing for The London Magazine.) As a result of these conversations, a letter to a letter signed by E. G. Crowsley appeared in The Times requesting that anyone interested in joining such a society contact him. Following an encouraging response a meeting was held on Friday 1 February in Essex Hall (now Essex Street Chapel) on the Strand, where Elia’s Aunt Hetty worshipped. This established the Charles Lamb Society, with Walter Farrow as founding chairman, Ernest G. Crowsley as general secretary, and Arthur Quiller-Couch as the first president. The Society met every month (often at the Chequers Restaurant on the Strand), celebrated Charles Lamb's birthday on 10 February, and made regular visits to places of Elian interest each summer. CLS events continued during the Second World War, including meetings in Essex Street during the Blitz. In 1945 the Society founded its own dramatic society, reading and performing plays by or about the Lambs. By the mid-1950s the Society's membership reached 500.

== Memorial ==
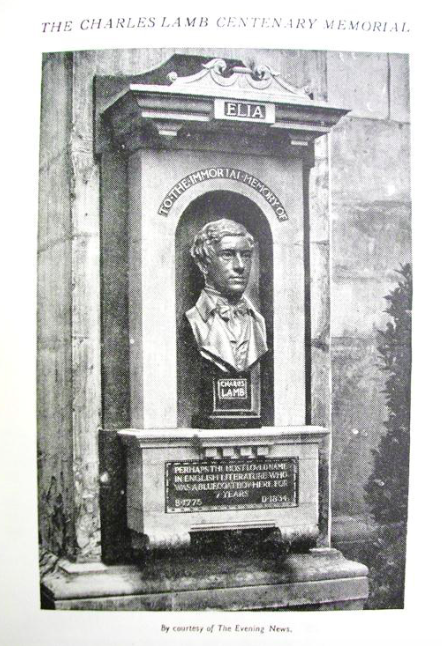
The Charles Lamb Memorial

Members of the Elian dining club launched a public appeal in 1934 to fund a memorial of Charles Lamb. They commissioned Sir William Reynolds-Stephens to create a bust of the Lamb which was placed on the north wall of Christ Church Greyfriars. It was unveiled on 5 November 1935 by Lord Plender. The church was largely destroyed by bombing in 1941, but the memorial had been moved to Christ’s Hospital in Horsham for safekeeping two years earlier. At its unveiling at the school Arthur Quiller-Couch noted Lamb's beautiful and 'astonishing capacity for attracting friendship'. The memorial was brought back to London in 1962 and attached to the east wall of the rebuilt watch tower of St Sepulchre-without-Newgate facing Giltspur Street. Lamb was at school with S. T. Coleridge at Christ's Hospital when it was at Newgate, London, and attended services at the church alongside his classmates.

== Objectives ==
The Society holds events to promote its principal objectives:

- To study the life, works and times of Charles and Mary Lamb and their circle
- To publish the Charles Lamb Bulletin, a highly regarded biannual peer-reviewed journal that prints essays, notes and queries on the Lambs and their circle
- To support conferences and research into the life, works and times of Charles and Mary Lamb and their circle.

== Journal ==
The Charles and Mary Lamb Journal (formerly The Charles Lamb Bulletin) is a peer-reviewed journal and a lively forum for discussion of all things Elian. Since it began in 1935, more than 400 different issues of the Bulletin have been printed, including articles, reviews, letters, and notes. Its first editor was S. M. Rich, who had previously compiled The Elian Miscellany, and who was succeeded by H. G. Smith in 1947. Distinguished scholars who have contributed include Jonathan Bate, Gillian Beer, John Beer, Edmund Blunden, Helen Darbishire, Earl Leslie Griggs, Nicholas Roe, and Duncan Wu. Past issues are available on the Society's website. These offer an excellent index to the developments in Lamb studies over the years.

== Collections ==
Over the years the Society acquired a collection of books, maps, pictures, and ephemera relating to Charles Lamb and the history of the Charles Lamb Society. It deposited this collection of c.2900 items at the Guildhall Library in 1979, close to where Lamb worked in the City of London, so that these items can be accessed by members of the public. The collection includes ephemera relating to Charles Lamb's friends and contemporaries, such as the title page of the New Annual Register for 1810, bearing William Wordsworth's ownership signature. Deborah Hedgecock has produced a list of the print items contained in the collection. The oil paintings from the Society's collection are at Guildhall Art Gallery.

== Funding ==
The Society regularly provides funding to further academic research on Charles and Mary Lamb and their circle. This includes subsidising conferences, providing bursaries for postgraduates to attend conferences and symposia, and sponsoring other Romanticist activities.

The Charles Lamb Society is a UK charity.
