= Practavia Sprite =

Sprite
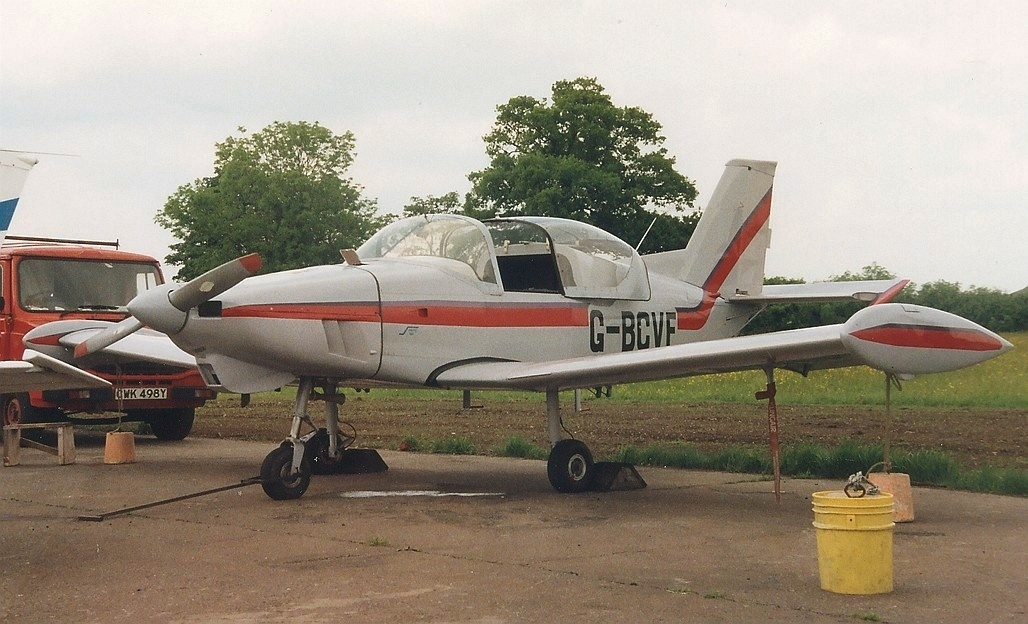

General information
- Type: Homebuilt trainer/tourer monoplane
- National origin: United Kingdom
- Manufacturer: Practavia
- Number built: 8

History
- First flight: 1971

The Practavia Sprite is a British two-seat homebuilt training or touring monoplane designed for amateur construction. It was the winning entry in a competition sponsored by Pilot magazine in 1968. The design had been begun as a magazine-sponsored project by Peter Garrison, who worked for Pilot at the time; when the project did not move forward rapidly enough to suit him, he returned to the United States, where he modified his design into what would become his first Melmoth.

== Development ==
The prototype Sprite, named the Pilot Sprite, was designed by a team at Loughborough University and had little in common with Garrison's design, though both were all-metal side-by-side low-wing cantilever monoplanes with tricycle landing gear. The Sprite was powered by a Rolls-Royce Continental O-240-A piston engine. Plans for amateur building were marketed by Practavia Ltd as the Practavia Sprite.

== Specifications ==
Data from Jane's All the World's Aircraft 1980–81

General characteristics

- Crew: 1 (pilot)
- Capacity: 1 (passenger)
- Length: 20 ft 0 in (6.10 m)
- Wingspan: 27 ft 0 in (8.23 m) (over tip tanks)
- Height: 8 ft 3 in (2.51 m)
- Wing area: 96.0 sq ft (8.92 m^{2})
- Aspect ratio: 6:1
- Airfoil: NACA 64315
- Empty weight: 850 lb (386 kg)
- Max takeoff weight: 1,400 lb (635 kg)
- Fuel capacity: 36 imp gal (43 US gal; 160 L)
- Powerplant: 1 × Rolls-Royce Continental O-240-A , 130 hp (97 kW)

Performance

- Cruise speed: 138 mph (222 km/h, 120 kn) (max cruise)
- Stall speed: 55 mph (89 km/h, 48 kn) (flaps down)
- Never exceed speed: 245 mph (394 km/h, 213 kn)
