= John Beer =

British literary critic

John Bernard Beer FBA (31 March 1926 – 10 December 2017) was a British literary critic. He was emeritus professor of English literature at the University of Cambridge and a fellow of Peterhouse, Cambridge. Best known as a scholar and critic of Romantic poets – especially William Blake, Samuel Taylor Coleridge, and William Wordsworth – he also published on E. M. Forster. He was elected a fellow of the British Academy in 1994.

Beer served in the RAF from 1946 to 1948. He was a junior research fellow at St John's College, Cambridge, from 1955 to 1958. Between 1958 and 1964 he was assistant lecturer and then lecturer at the University of Manchester. From 1964 until his retirement in 1993, he was successively lecturer, reader (1978) and professor (1987) of English literature at the University of Cambridge. He was married to the literary critic Gillian Beer, DBE. He was president of the Charles Lamb Society from 1989 until 2002. He was a Leverhulme emeritus fellow in 1995–1996 and was the 2006 Stanton lecturer in the philosophy of religion in the University of Cambridge.

== Works ==
- Coleridge, the Visionary, Chatto & Windus, 1959; Humanities Ebooks, 2007. ISBN 978-1-84760-044-8
- The Achievement of E. M. Forster, Chatto & Windus, 1962; Humanities Ebooks, 2007. ISBN 978-1-84760-003-5
- Blake's humanism, Manchester University Press/Barnes & Noble, 1968; Humanities Ebooks, 2007. ISBN 978-1-84760-000-4
- Blake's Visionary Universe, Manchester University Press/Barnes & Noble, 1969. ISBN 0-7190-0390-3
- Coleridge's Poetic Intelligence, Macmillan, 1977. ISBN 0-333-21312-2
- Wordsworth and the human heart, 1978. ISBN 978-0-231-04646-6
- Questioning Romanticism, Johns Hopkins University Press, 1995. ISBN 0-8018-5052-5
- Post-Romantic Consciousness: Dickens to Plath, Palgrave Macmillan, 2003. ISBN 1-4039-0518-5
- William Blake: a Literary Life, Palgrave Macmillan, 2005. ISBN 978-1-4039-3954-8
