= Melmoth the Wanderer =

1820 novel by Charles Maturin

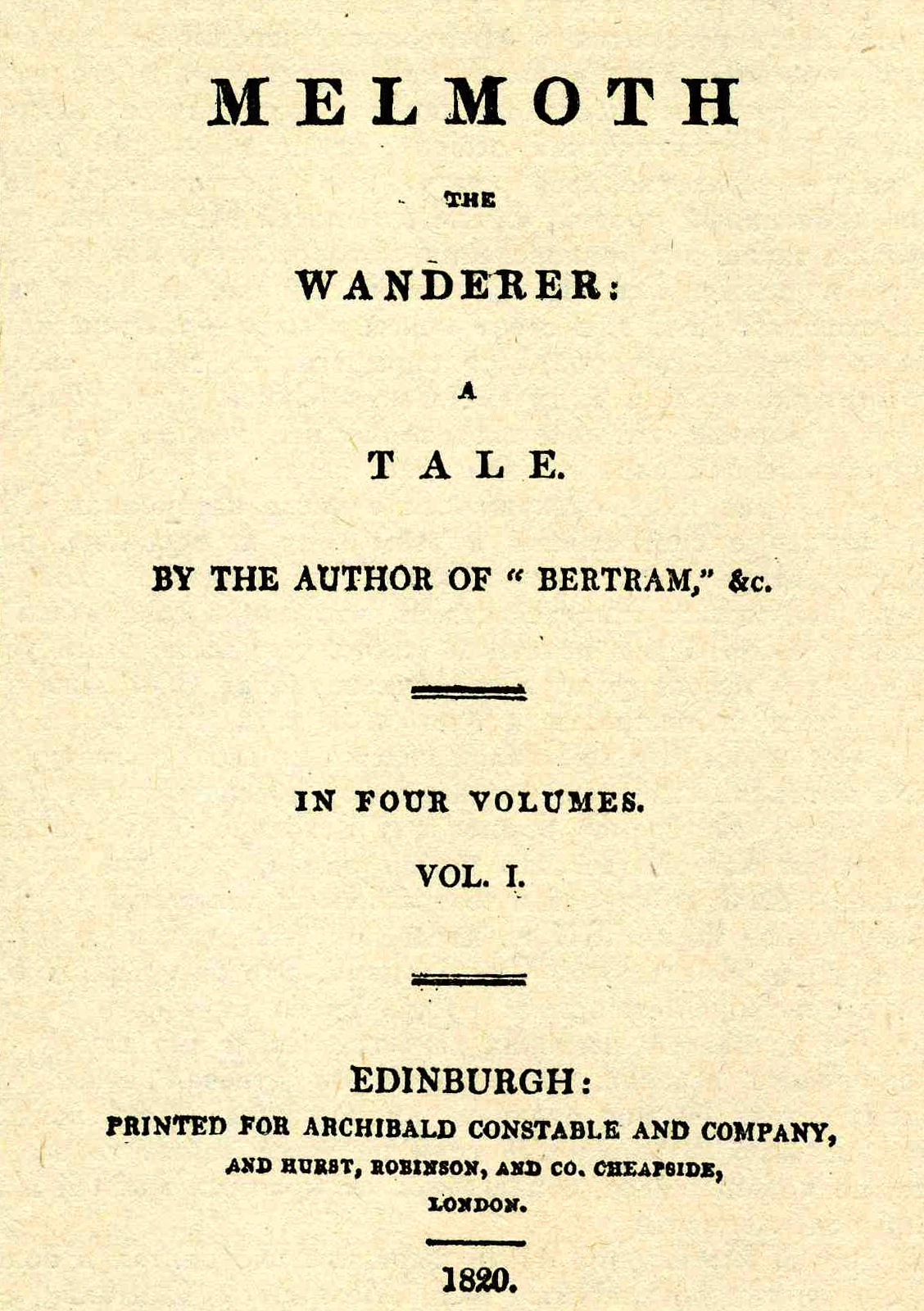
- Title page of Volume 1, first edition
- Author: Charles Maturin
- Language: English
- Genre: Gothic novel, Romanticism
- Publication date: October 1820
- Publication place: Ireland
- Media type: Print (novel)

Melmoth the Wanderer is an 1820 Gothic novel by Irish playwright, novelist and clergyman Charles Maturin. The novel's titular character is a scholar who sold his soul to the devil in exchange for 150 extra years of life, and searches the world for someone who will take over the pact for him, in a manner reminiscent of the Wandering Jew.

The novel is composed of a series of nested stories within stories, gradually revealing the story of Melmoth's life. The novel offers social commentary on early 19th-century England, and denounces Roman Catholicism in favour of the virtues of Protestantism.

== Background ==
The structure of the book as a series of short stories joined reflects its initial conception as such. In reality, Maturin was under pressure from his publisher to fulfil a contractual obligation, which goes some way to explaining the "chaotic and haphazard process by which (he) wrote". Maturin spent many hours researching the novel in Marsh's Library, Ireland's first public library (opened in 1707), which was a short distance from his home on York Street and place of work on Aungier Street. In the library, Maturin took inspiration from many sources, including the King James Bible, the Anglican liturgy, the works of William Shakespeare, Virgil's Aeneid, polemical books and pamphlets of the English Revolution of the mid-17th century, and various literature and theatre from the 16th and 17th centuries. Maturin spent so much time reading in Marsh's each day that he eventually constructed a special desk for himself there.

== Synopsis ==
John Melmoth, a student in Dublin, visits his dying uncle. He finds a portrait of a mysterious ancestor called "Melmoth"; the portrait is dated 1646. At his uncle's funeral, John is told an old family story about a stranger called Stanton, who arrived looking for "Melmoth the Traveller" decades earlier.

A manuscript left by Stanton describes his first finding Melmoth laughing at the sight of two lovers who have been struck by lightning, and hearing of a wedding at which Melmoth was an uninvited guest: the bride died and the bridegroom went mad. Stanton's search for Melmoth is deemed to be madness and he is sent to a madhouse. Melmoth visits him there, and offers to free him, but Stanton refuses and escapes.

Following his uncle's wish, John burns the Melmoth portrait. He is visited by Melmoth in a dream, and later sees Melmoth laughing at a shipwreck. John tries to approach him, but slips and falls into the sea. He is saved from drowning by the sole survivor of the wreck, a Spaniard named Alonzo Monçada.

Alonzo Monçada tells his story (The Tale of the Spaniard), in which his family confines him to a monastery. He is mistreated by the monks, and his brother Juan arranges for him to escape with the help of a fellow monk, a parricide. The escape plan is a trap and Juan is killed. Monçada is taken to the prison of the Inquisition. There he is visited in his cell by Melmoth, who says he will help him escape. A fire breaks out, and in the confusion Monçada escapes. He meets a venerable Jewish scholar, Adonijah, who lives in a secret chamber decorated with the skeletons of his own family. In exchange for food and shelter, Adonijah compels Monçada to transcribe a manuscript for him: the Tale of the Indians.

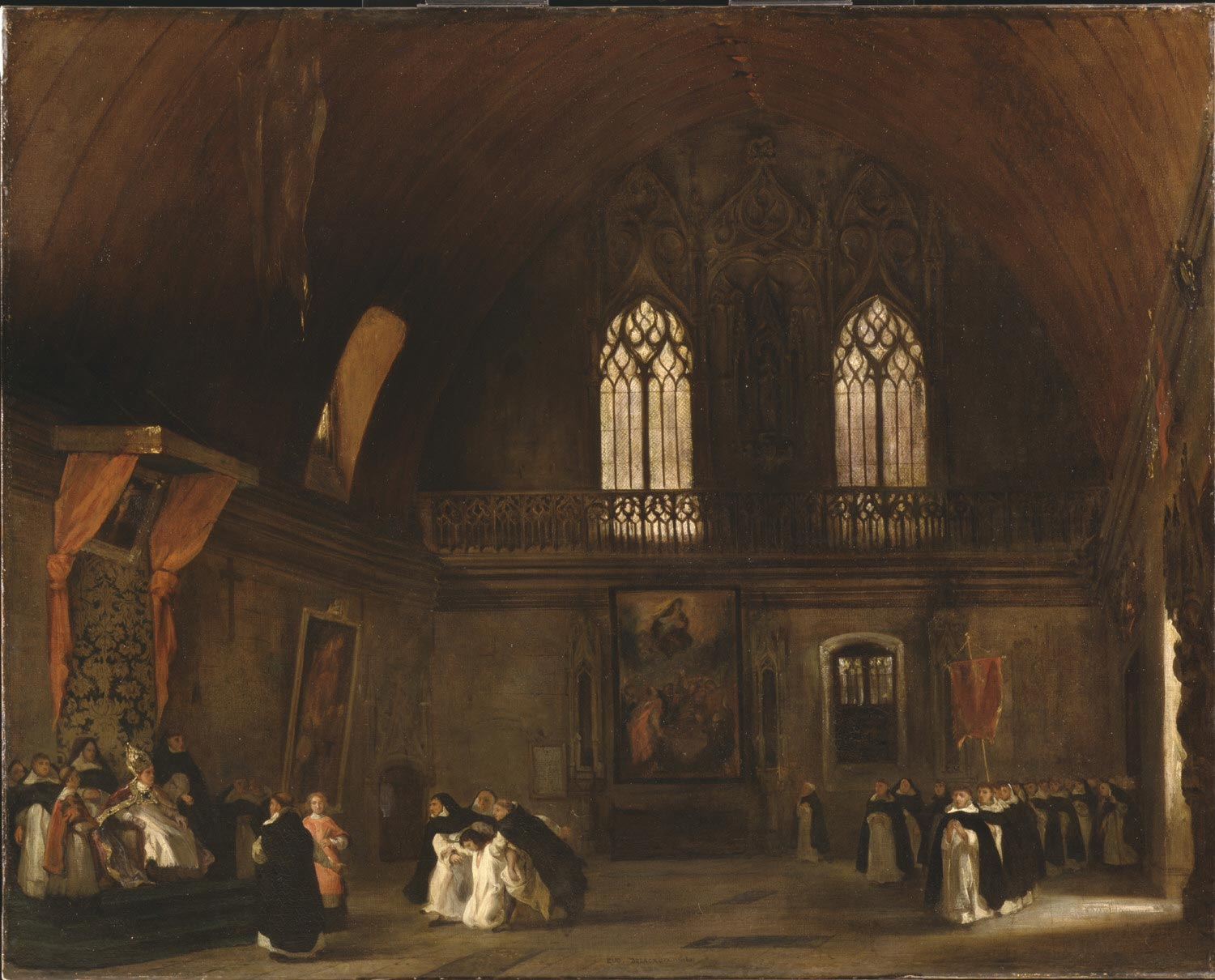
Melmoth, or Interior of a Dominican Convent in Madrid, illustrating Alonzo Moncada's story from the novel. Eugène Delacroix, oil on canvas, 1831

The Tale of the Indians tells of an island in the Indian Ocean which is rumoured to be haunted by a white goddess named Immalee. In reality, Immalee is a castaway who grew up alone on the island, isolated from humanity. She is visited by Melmoth, who tells her he comes from "the world that suffers". He tries to destroy her innocence, showing her the shortcomings of human societies and religions. She falls in love with him and begs him to stay with her, but he departs. Three years later, Immalee, now named Isidora, has been restored to her family in Madrid. Melmoth reappears and he and Isidora elope by night; he leads her to a remote chapel where they are married by an undead hermit.

Isidora's father encounters a stranger at an inn who tells him the Tale of Guzman's Family. Guzman is a wealthy Spanish merchant whose sister marries a poor German musician, Walberg. Guzman decides to make Walberg's family his heirs, but his will leaves everything to the church, and the family sinks into poverty; almost insane, Walberg decides to end their poverty by killing them all – but before he does so news arrives that the true will has been found and the family is saved. By this point in the story, Isidora's father has fallen asleep, and wakes to find the stranger at the inn replaced by Melmoth.

Melmoth tells him the Lovers' Tale, about a young woman in Yorkshire named Elinor, who is jilted at the altar and is subsequently tempted by Melmoth, but refuses his help.

The Tale of the Indians resumes: Isidora returns to her family, but she is pregnant with Melmoth's child. She has a presentiment that she will not live, and gets Melmoth to promise that the child will be raised as a Christian. Isidora's father finds a husband for her, but in the middle of the wedding celebrations, Melmoth tries to abduct Isidora. Her brother tries to intervene, and Melmoth kills him. Isidora falls senseless and Melmoth escapes. Isidora reveals that she is already married, to Melmoth. She gives birth, but she and her baby daughter are imprisoned by the Inquisition. The inquisitors threaten to take away the child, but find that it is already dead. Isidora, dying of grief, remembers her island paradise, and asks if "he" will be in the heavenly paradise.

Monçada and John are interrupted by the appearance of Melmoth himself. He confesses to them his purpose on Earth, that his extended life is almost over, and that he has never been successful in tempting another into damnation: "I have traversed the world in the search, and no one to gain that world, would lose his own soul!" Melmoth has a dream of his own damnation, and of the salvation of Stanton, Walberg, Elinor, Isidora and Monçada. He asks John and Monçada to leave him alone for his last few hours of mortal existence. They hear terrible sounds from the room, but when they enter, the room is empty. They follow Melmoth's tracks to the top of a cliff, and see his handkerchief on a crag below them. "Exchanging looks of silent and unutterable horror", they return home.

== Reception ==
Honoré de Balzac wrote a follow-up story (Melmoth Reconciled) and considered Maturin's novel worthy of a place among Molière's Dom Juan, Goethe's Faust and Lord Byron's Manfred as one of the supreme icons of modern European literature.

Oscar Wilde, during his travels after release from prison, called himself Sebastian Melmoth, deriving this pseudonym from the title character in his great-uncle's novel and from Saint Sebastian.

The historian of English literature Walter Raleigh, in his book The English Novel (1905), stated "in Frankenstein and Melmoth the Wanderer, the Romantic orgy reached its height". The novel was described by H. P. Lovecraft as "an enormous stride in the evolution of the horror-tale", and Maurice Richardson also wrote an essay for Lilliput magazine praising Melmoth. Melmoth the Wanderer was cited by Karl Edward Wagner as one of the 13 best supernatural horror novels. Thomas M. Disch placed Melmoth the Wanderer at number four in his list of classic fantasy stories. Devendra P. Varma described Melmoth the Wanderer as "the crowning achievement of the Gothic Romance". Michael Moorcock has described Melmoth the Wanderer as "one of my favourites".

The literary critic John Strachan notes the fact that much of the novel is set in contemporary Ireland and Spain is not surprising, considering the extent to which both countries haunted Maturin's imagination. Ireland, despite its adherence to Catholicism, at least had the perceived "benefit of the Union and the blessings of a free or mixed government to prevent it sliding into tyranny and oppression", whereas Spain "had no such good fortune and was a country where the untrammelled efforts of Catholicism were displayed". Stephen King has also called it "the last and greatest novel of the Gothic era."

== Commemorations ==
Marsh's Library held an exhibition celebrating the bicentenary of the book in 2020, entitled Ragged, Livid & On Fire: The Wanderings of Melmoth at 200.

== References in other works ==
- In Arturo Pérez-Reverte's The Club Dumas (the basis for Roman Polanski's film The Ninth Gate), Corso bumps into the mystery girl following him as she is reading Melmoth the Wanderer in the lobby of the hotel after seeing Fargas to review his copy of The Nine Doors of the Kingdom of Shadows.
- In Nathaniel Hawthorne's Fanshawe, one of the major characters is named "Doctor Melmoth".
- In Vladimir Nabokov's Lolita, Professor Humbert Humbert calls his automobile "Melmoth".
- In John Banville's 1989 novel The Book of Evidence, the narrator steals an automobile from a garage called "Melmoth's"; the make of the car is a Humber, an allusion to both Wilde and Nabokov.
- "Melmoth" is mentioned in Alexander Pushkin's Eugene Onegin.
- In Dave Sim's Cerebus comic book (issues 139–150), there's a writer named Oscar (homage to Oscar Wilde), who's registered under the name "Melmoth" at his hotel.
- In Grant Morrison's Seven Soldiers metaseries, Melmoth is an antagonist of Frankenstein.
- In Leonie Swann's Three Bags Full: A Sheep Detective Story, the mysterious sheep who has wandered the world and comes home to teach the flock what he has learned is named Melmoth.
- The mysterious financier Augustus Melmotte in Anthony Trollope's The Way We Live Now resembles Melmoth in more than name.
- In an 1842 review of Stanley Thorn, Edgar Allan Poe refers to "the devil in Melmoth" as an ineffectual seducer of souls.
- In letters H. P. Lovecraft addresses Donald Wandrei as Melmoth the Wandrei.
- A British magazine about surrealism was named Melmoth after the book. Melmoth was published from 1979 to 1981 and its contributors included George Melly and Ithell Colquhoun.
- In the British TV murder mystery series Midsomer Murders, the episode "Murder by Magic" (2015) included a mysterious country manor called Melmouth House, the home of an infamous rake-hell and paganist, Sir Henry Melmouth, who died, apparently, in a ritual pagan fire, hoping to be reborn from the ashes like the mythical phoenix.
- In Marty Feldman's television series Marty (1968–1971), Spike Milligan and Feldman play rival undertakers called Melmoth.
- In Marty Feldman's movie In God We Tru$t (1980), Peter Boyle plays a con man and crooked street preacher named Dr. Sebastian Melmoth.
- The book's title and many of its themes inspired Anne Rice's Memnoch the Devil novel.
- Peter Garrison named the aircraft Garrison Melmoth after himself and Melmoth the Wanderer.
- Sarah Perry's third novel, Melmoth (2018), centres on a female variation of Maturin's character, damned (like Richard Wagner's Kundry in Parsifal) for denying the resurrection of Jesus Christ.
- In the Julio Cortázar novel Hopscotch, a character denies being either a Maldoror or a Melmoth despite quite a bit of wandering about.
