= Donald Taylor (aviator) =

American aviator

- Born: October 1, 1918
- Died: December 2, 2015 (aged 97)
- Occupation: Aviator
- Known for: First person to successfully fly a homebuilt aircraft around the world

Donald P. Taylor (October 1, 1918 – December 2, 2015) was an American aviator, notable for being the first person in history in the late summer and early fall of 1976 to successfully fly a homebuilt aircraft around the world.

== Career ==
From an early age, he'd resolved "I will build an airplane, and I will fly it round-the-world." His plane, Victoria '76 (named for the only one of Ferdinand Magellan's ships to complete her mission), a Lycoming-powered Thorp T-18 (N455DT) was fitted with improved communications and navigational equipment as well as a new fuel system after his initial 1973 round-the-world attempt had to be aborted due to bad weather between Japan and the Aleutian Islands. Taylor, who lived at the time in California, returned to his starting point of Oshkosh, Wisconsin a hero two months to the day after the August 1, 1976, start of his eastbound journey. The planning of this circumnavigation was especially complicated considering that both the People's Republic of China and the Union of Soviet Socialist Republics were closed to U.S. general aviators at the time.

Taylor flew Victoria 76 to Australia and back in 1980. Taylor flew Victoria '76 to both the true North Pole and the Magnetic North Pole in 1984. Although the aircraft had a special heritage, he used "her" for routine transportation to and from his isolated ranch in the Southern California high semi-desert. In the early 1980s, he had offered the T-18 to the Smithsonian Air and Space Museum in Washington, D.C. for display, but he was unable to obtain a firm agreement from them to display her to the public as he wished. Instead, Victoria '76 is now on display at the Experimental Aircraft Association's AirVenture museum in Oshkosh. His civilian flying awards include the FAA Distinguished Service Award (1977) and the NAA Harmon Internal Trophy (1984 Aviator), which was presented to him on March 20, 1989, by Vice President Dan Quayle.

Taylor maintained an active involvement and interest in aviation. He was on a mission-control team supporting the round-the-world flight of the Rutan Voyager in December 1986

== Early career ==
Taylor retired at the rank of lieutenant colonel from the United States Air Force in 1962, having seen action during World War II in the China-Burma-India (CBI) Theater. During the Korean War he was stationed in Alaska, servicing the newly created Distant Early Warning Line [DEW-Line] stations with air cargo and electronics expertise. In the Late 1950s he commanded an Air Training Command (ATC) Detachment that was responsible for teaching Thor Missile maintenance and operation to RAF personnel in central England.

== Death ==
He died in December 2015 at the age of 97.
