= Peter Garrison =

American journalist

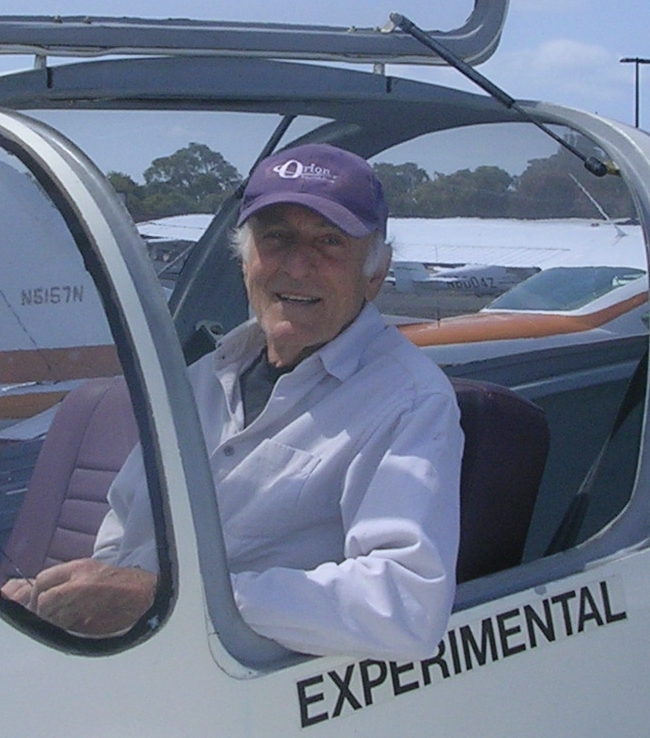
- Peter Garrison at the controls of Melmoth 2
- Born: 21 August 1943 (age 83); Los Angeles, California
- Occupations: journalist, author, airplane designer, software engineer

Peter Garrison is an American journalist and amateur aircraft designer/builder. He was born in Los Angeles, California, in 1943, and received a BA in English from Harvard College in 1965.

In 1968–1973, while living in Tarzana, California, he designed and built an all-metal, two-seat, single-engine low-wing monoplane. The design was influenced by the T-18 of John Thorp and the PL-2 of Ladislao Pazmany, both California airplane designer/builders. Garrison called the plane Melmoth after an 1820 Gothic novel, Melmoth the Wanderer. It was notable for unusually long range and for Mr. Garrison's lack of academic qualifications for designing it. With his companion, television documentary producer Nancy Salter, Mr. Garrison used the aircraft to fly to Europe, Japan and South America. The 1976 Pacific crossing was the first nonstop flight from the United States to Japan by a homebuilt aircraft.

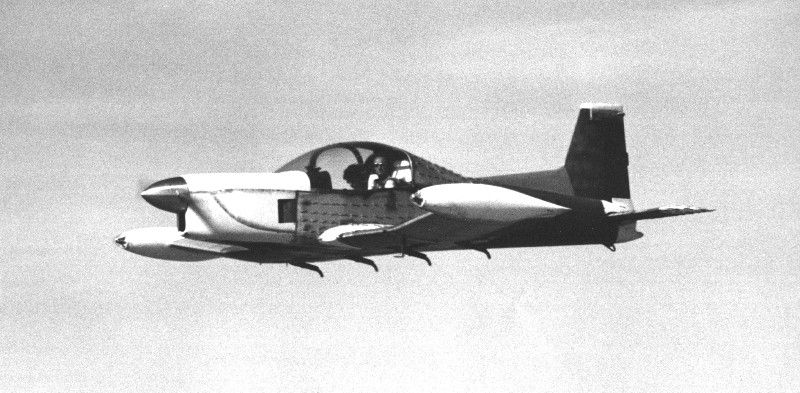
Peter Garrison test-flying the as-yet unpainted Melmoth in 1973. Yarn tufts on fuselage reveal air flow over wing. The horizontal tail was later moved to the top of the vertical tail.

In 1981 he began design work on an enlarged fuselage for Melmoth. In 1982, however, the original airplane was destroyed at Orange County (California) Airport (now John Wayne) when a landing Cessna collided with it. The completely redesigned Melmoth 2 first flew in 2002. It is constructed of glass- and carbon-fiber-reinforced composites and has four seats; the rear seats face aft, an arrangement that reduces the required cabin size and center-of-gravity range. The airplane, which has retractable landing gear, large hydraulically operated Fowler flaps and a 200 hp turbocharged Continental engine salvaged from the first Melmoth, is based at Whiteman Airport in Los Angeles. Like its predecessor, it has a cruising range of more than 3,000 miles.

Peter Garrison is a free-lance writer. He contributes two monthly columns, Aftermath and Technicalities, to Flying magazine, for which he has written since 1968. With David Pinella, he co-founded AeroLogic, a company that creates and sells computer software programs to analyze fluid dynamics.

As of December 2009, Mr. Garrison had 4,000 hours of flight time. He holds a single-/multi-engine commercial pilot license with instrument, Learjet, helicopter, seaplane, glider, gyroplane and hot-air balloon ratings.

He is the great-grandson of the Armenian author Muratsan. He and Ms. Salter have a son, Nicholas, born in 1981, and a daughter, Lily, born in 1988.

Mr. Garrison has no connection to Craig Shaw Gardner, a prolific science-fiction writer, born in 1949, who writes under the pseudonym "Peter Garrison."

== Bibliography ==
- Homebuilt Airplanes. Chronicle Books. 1992. ISBN 978-0877011491.
- CV Carrier Aviation. Presidio Press. 1988. ISBN 978-0891412991.
- Long Distance Flying (A pilot's library book). Bantam Doubleday Dell Publishing Group. 1982. ISBN 978-0385145954.
