= Lucas L5 =

L5

General information
- Type: Homebuilt aircraft
- National origin: France
- Manufacturer: Homebuilt
- Designer: Emile Lucas

History
- First flight: 13 August 1976

The Lucas L5 was a sport aircraft designed in France in the late 1970s and marketed for amateur construction. It was a conventional, low-wing cantilever monoplane with side-by-side seating for two in a fully enclosed cabin. Construction was of metal throughout, and the builder was given the option of fixed, tricycle undercarriage, or tailwheel undercarriage in which the main units were manually retractable.

== Specifications ==
Data from Jane's All the World's Aircraft 1977–78, 494

General characteristics

- Crew: One pilot
- Capacity: 1 passenger
- Length: 6.30 m (20 ft 8 in)
- Wingspan: 9.20 m (30 ft 2 in)
- Height: 2.10 m (6 ft 11 in)
- Wing area: 11.9 m^{2} (128 sq ft)
- Empty weight: 505 kg (1,113 lb)
- Gross weight: 946 kg (2,086 lb)
- Powerplant: 1 × Lycoming O-235 , 86 kW (115 hp)

Performance

- Maximum speed: 260 km/h (160 mph, 140 kn)
- Range: 1,000 km (620 mi, 540 nmi)
- Rate of climb: 5.0 m/s (985 ft/min)
