= American Airlines Flight 625 =

1976 aviation accident in the United States Virgin Islands

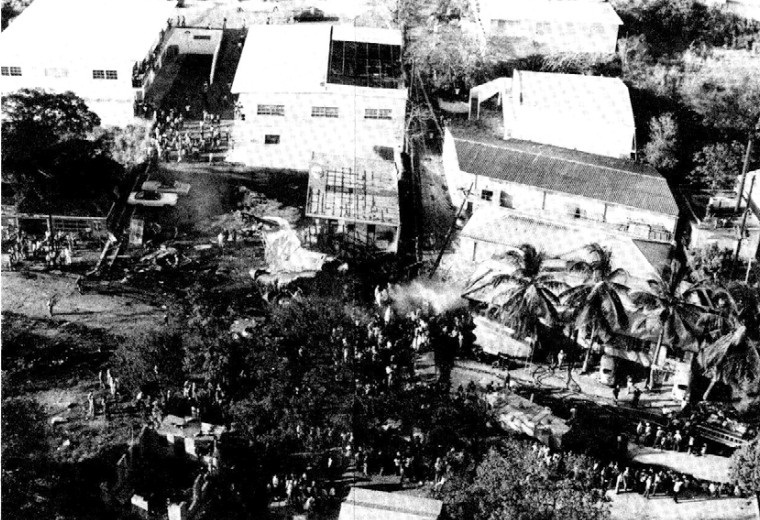
- Aerial view of the crash site

Accident
- Date: April 27, 1976
- Summary: Runway overrun caused by pilot error
- Site: Harry S. Truman Airport, Saint Thomas, United States Virgin Islands; 18°20′28″N 64°57′39″W
- Total fatalities: 37
- Total injuries: 39

Aircraft
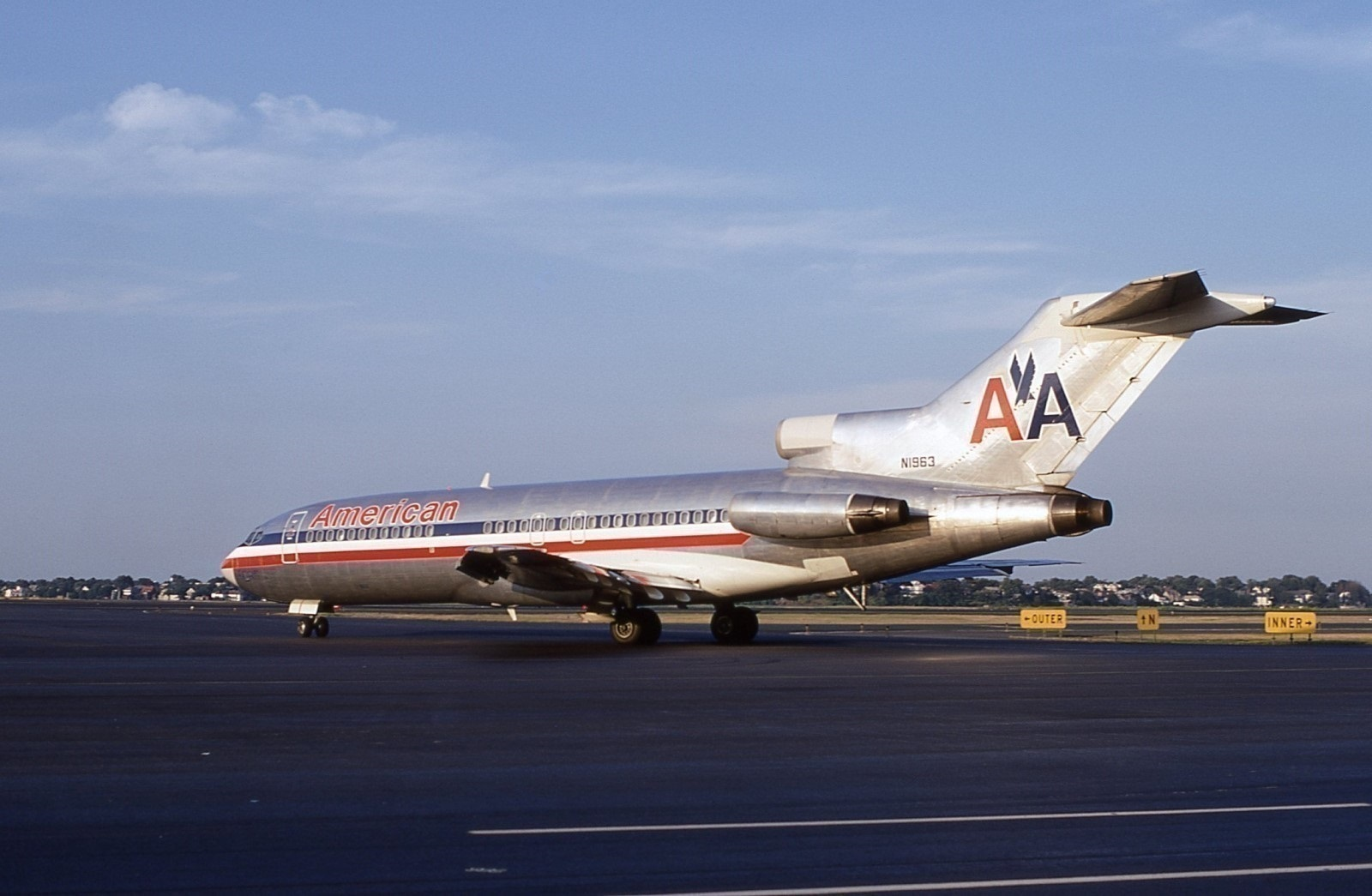
- N1963, the aircraft involved in the accident, photographed in 1972
- Aircraft type: Boeing 727-195 (Note: The 100 model has a vertically oblong air inlet to the center engine (dorsal inlet); the 200 model inlet is round. Additionally, the Model 200 is 20 feet longer than the Model 100: 10 feet in front and 10 feet aft of the wing.)
- Operator: American Airlines
- IATA flight No.: AA625
- ICAO flight No.: AAL625
- Call sign: AMERICAN 625
- Registration: N1963
- Flight origin: Rhode Island T. F. Green International Airport, Warwick, Rhode Island, United States
- Stopover: John F. Kennedy International Airport, New York City, United States
- Destination: Harry S. Truman Airport, Saint Thomas, U.S. Virgin Islands
- Occupants: 88
- Passengers: 81
- Crew: 7
- Fatalities: 37
- Injuries: 38
- Survivors: 51

Ground casualties
- Ground injuries: 1

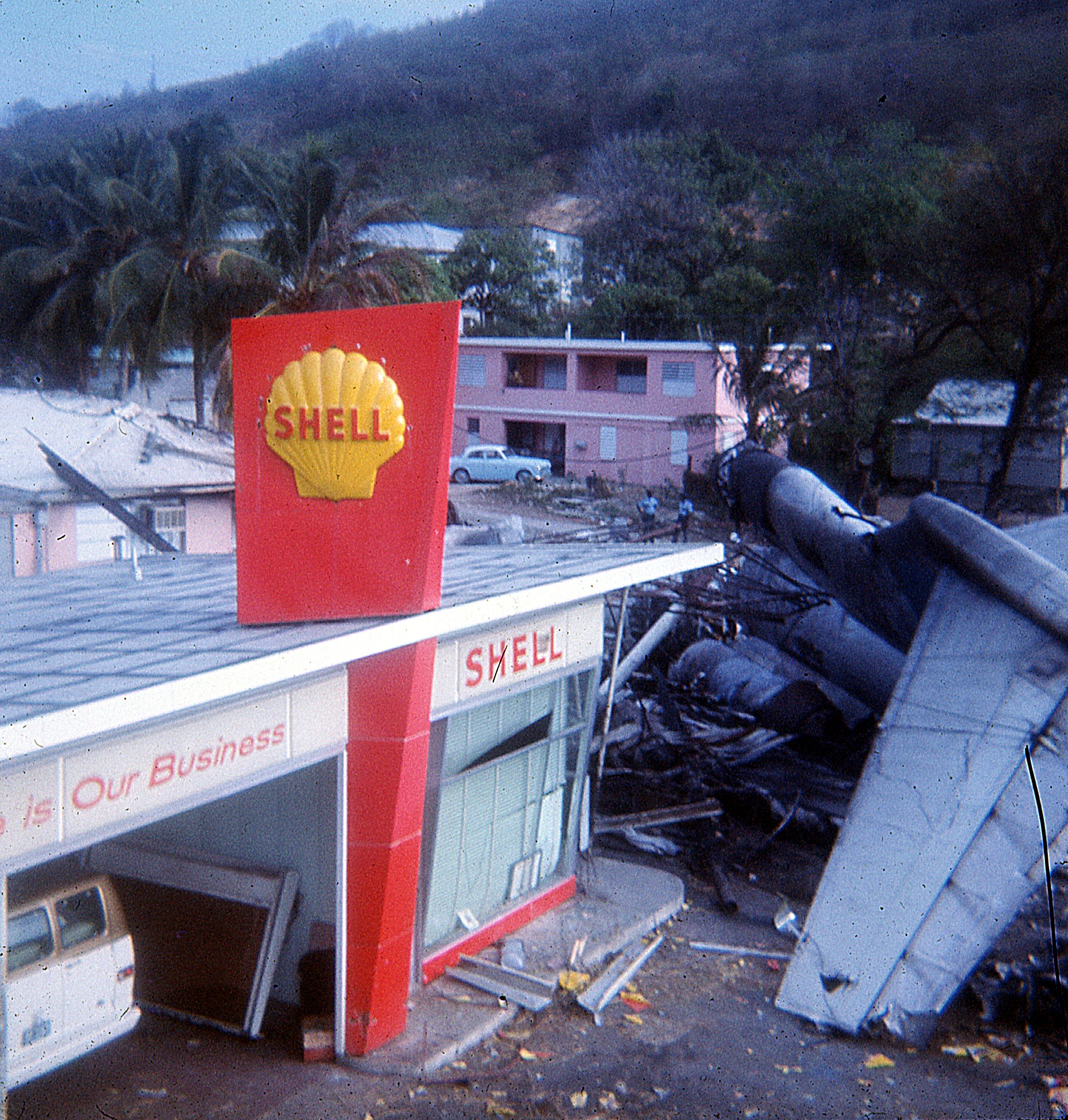
The aircraft's tail ended up near a Shell gas station

American Airlines Flight 625, a Boeing 727, crashed at St. Thomas, U.S. Virgin Islands, on April 27, 1976, while on a domestic scheduled passenger flight originating at T. F. Green Airport in Rhode Island and ending at Saint Thomas, United States Virgin Islands, with an intermediate stop at John F. Kennedy International Airport. Out of the 88 occupants on board, 37 were killed in the accident.

== Background ==
The airport in St. Thomas was notorious among pilots for its short (4,658 feet (1,420 m)) runway. In fact, the Boeing 727 was the heaviest aircraft type authorized to use it, and even then it was only authorized in one direction.

=== Aircraft ===
The aircraft involved was a Boeing 727-195 registered as N1963. It was the 499th Boeing 727 ever built. It had logged a total of 21,926 hours of flying time. The aircraft was equipped with three Pratt & Whitney JT8D-7A engines.

=== Crew ===
The captain onboard flight 625 was 54-year-old Arthur Bujnowski. He had 22,225 flight hours, with about 10,000 being on the 727. First officer Edward Offchiss was 36, and had 2,500 of his 8,000 flight hours on the 727. Flight engineer Donald Meatler was 45, with 9,500 flight hours, with 8,000 being in the 727.

== Accident ==
The American Airlines Boeing 727-195, registration N1963, overran the departure end of Runway 9 when landing at Harry S. Truman airport. The aircraft ran off the end of the runway and into a Shell gas station, killing 37 (35 passengers and 2 flight attendants) of the 88 on board. Thirty-eight other passengers and crew were injured, and one person on the ground was seriously injured. The probable cause was the captain's actions and his judgment in not being aware that when he touched down 2,300 feet (700 m) down the 4,658-foot (1,420 m) runway, he did not have enough distance to perform a go-around.

== Investigation ==
Ultimately, the National Transportation Safety Board (NTSB) attributed the accident to pilot error on the approach. The maximum flap setting of 40 degrees was never applied, which meant that the aircraft's speed was 10 knots (19 km/h; 12 mph) higher than V_{REF} as it crossed the runway threshold. This, combined with the fact that the aircraft 'floated' from turbulent winds in the area, meant that it was already 2,300 feet (700 m) down the runway at the point of touchdown. The pilots did not brake, and proceeded to apply full throttle three seconds after touchdown in an attempt at a go-around. However, they were unable to reach takeoff speed because the 727's engines are slow-responding, taking about 6.6 seconds to power up. After five seconds of waiting for power, and with only 700 feet (210 m) of runway left, the pilot panicked, according to the report, and applied full brakes. Further, the pilot forgot to apply reverse engine thrust until immediately before impact.

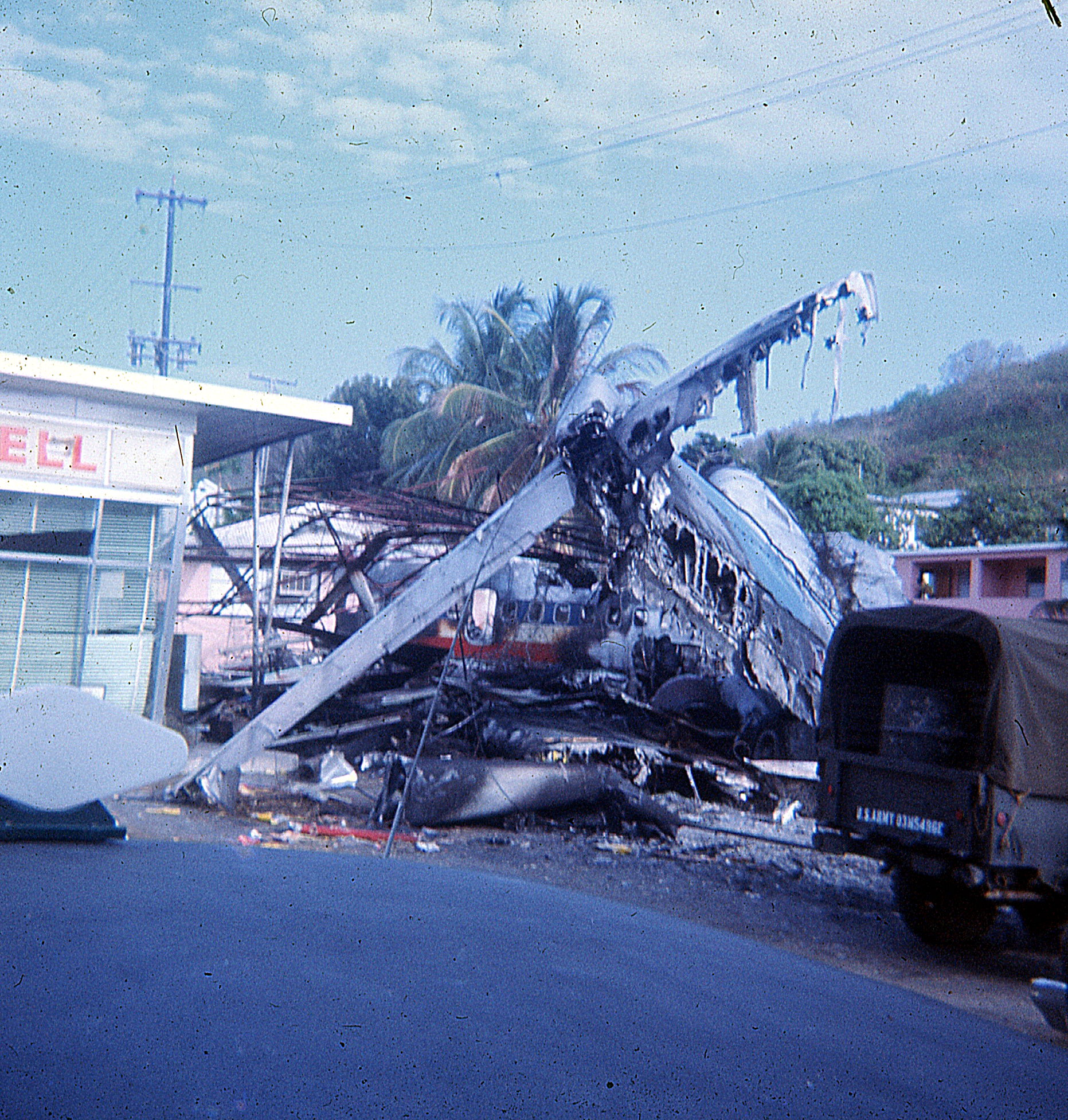
Photo of the wreckage site a few days after the accident

== Aftermath ==
As a result of the accident, American Airlines ended all jet flights to St. Thomas, flying instead to St. Croix (which had a 7,600 foot runway at the time). American Airlines passengers were then flown to St. Thomas in Convair 440 propeller-driven aircraft from St. Croix, with these flights being operated by a wholly owned subsidiary, American Inter-Island Airlines. The Convair 440 aircraft were owned by American Airlines and flown and maintained via contract by Antilles Air Boats, a seaplane operator in the U.S. Virgin Islands. Jet flights operated by American resumed when a new runway at St. Thomas was constructed with a length of 7,000 feet (2,100 m).

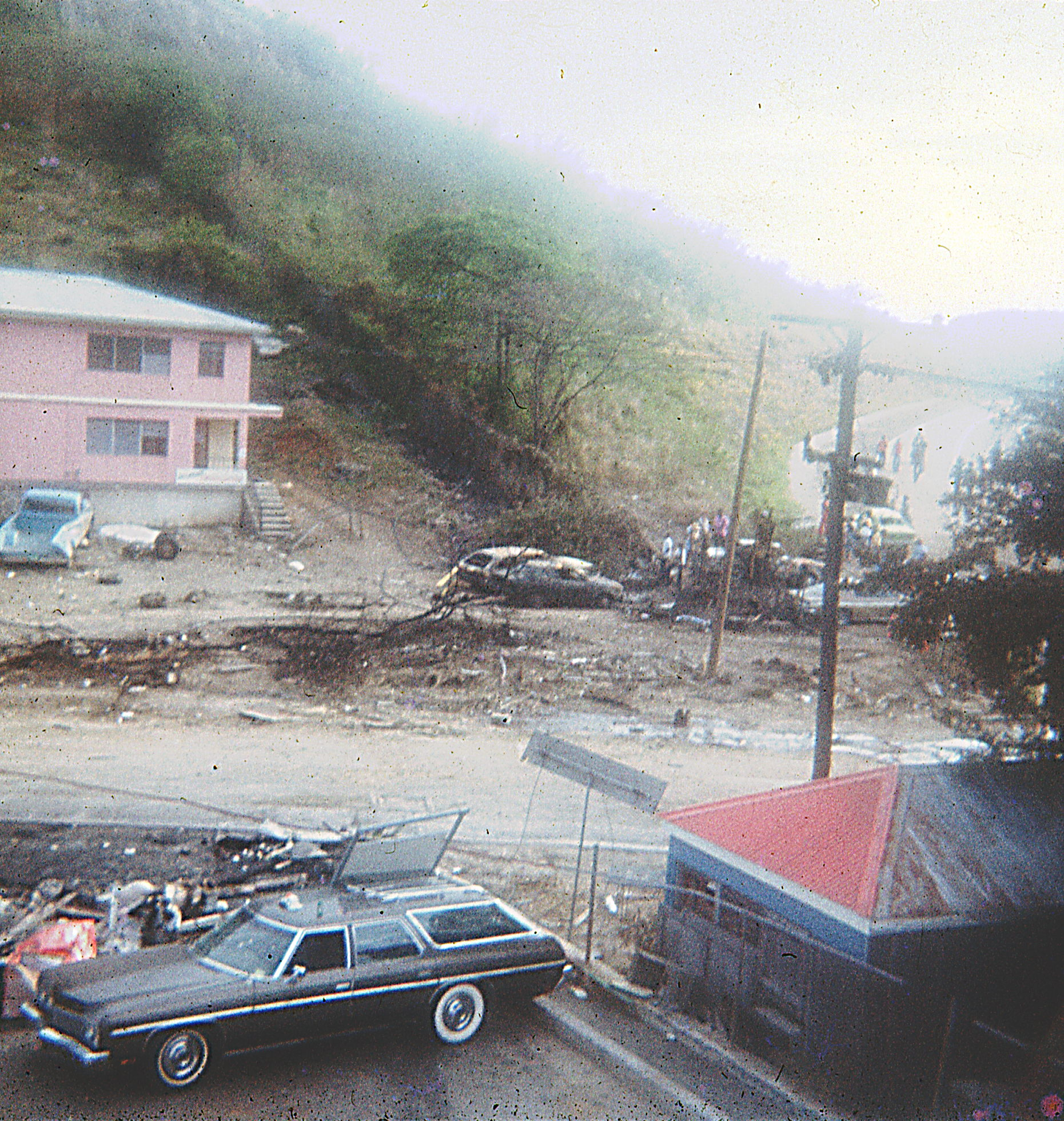
A few cars next to the accident site

== In popular culture ==
American Airlines Flight 625 was specifically mentioned in the movie Rain Man.

== See also ==
- Aviation safety
