= Garrison Melmoth 2 =

Melmoth 2
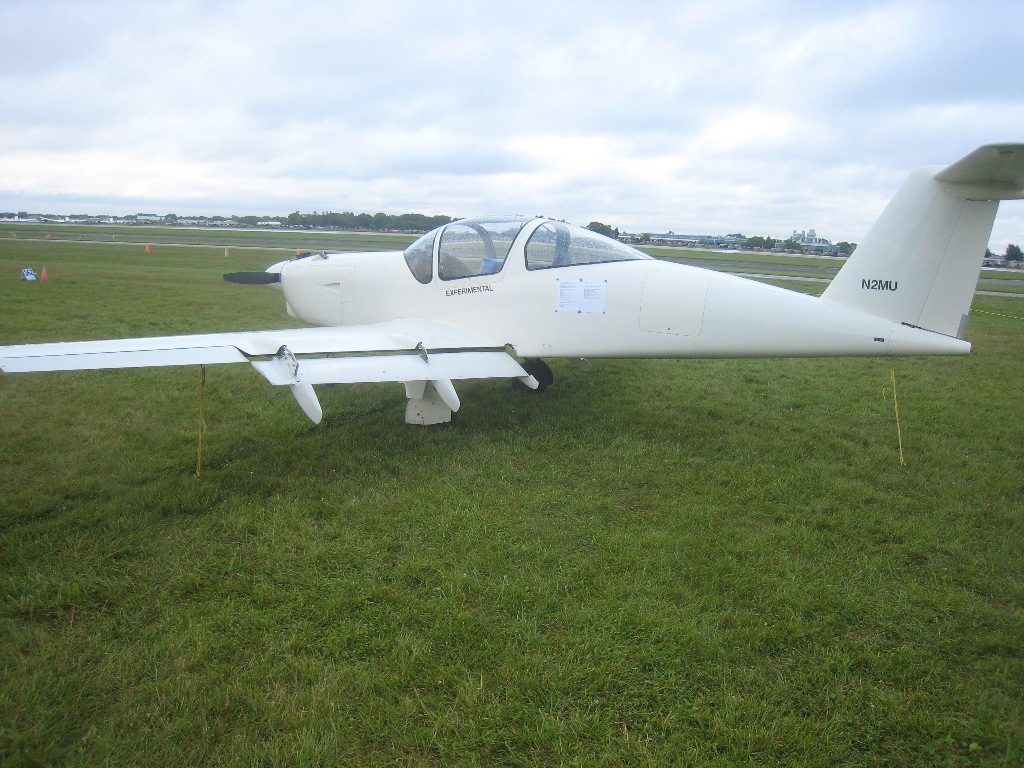

General information
- Type: Homebuilt aircraft
- National origin: United States
- Designer: Peter Garrison
- Number built: 1

History
- First flight: 1 November 2002
- Developed from: Garrison Melmoth

The Garrison Melmoth 2 is the second aircraft design from author Peter Garrison.

== Development ==
The Melmoth 2 was started in August 1981 as a composite follow-on to the complex Melmoth homebuilt. Initial fuselage lay-up was performed by Garrison along with engineer Burt Rutan and future private astronaut Mike Melvill, who also performed a fair number of the test flights. The aircraft is a single engine four-seat retractable tricycle gear low-wing with a T-tail arrangement. The rear seats face aft. The engine is cooled using updraft air which enters through a single inlet below the spinner and emerges from the top of the cowling near the spinner. A single airbrake panel opens under the fuselage. The tapered wings are equipped with large Fowler flaps. The original design has been modified with 45-degree sweep winglets and gear doors.

== Specifications (Melmoth 2) ==
Data from Flying Magazine

General characteristics

- Crew: 1
- Capacity: 3 passengers
- Length: 24 ft (7.3 m)
- Wingspan: 35.7 ft (10.9 m)
- Wing area: 106 sq ft (9.8 m^{2})
- Aspect ratio: 12.6
- Airfoil: Roncz laminar flow
- Empty weight: 1,600 lb (726 kg)
- Gross weight: 2,850 lb (1,293 kg)
- Fuel capacity: 142 U.S. gallons (540 L; 118 imp gal)
- Powerplant: 1 × Continental TSIO-360 , 200 hp (150 kW)
- Propellers: 2-bladed Hartzell constant speed

Performance

- Maximum speed: 220 kn (250 mph, 400 km/h)
- Cruise speed: 200 kn (230 mph, 370 km/h)
- Stall speed: 53 kn (61 mph, 98 km/h)
- Never exceed speed: 190 kn (220 mph, 350 km/h)
- Range: 2,600 nmi (3,000 mi, 4,800 km)
- Rate of climb: 2,000 ft/min (10 m/s)

== See also ==
Aircraft of comparable role, configuration, and era

- Scaled Composites Catbird
