= John Strachan (cricketer) =

English cricketer and British Army officer

Personal information
- Full name: John Harold Strachan
- Born: 8 March 1896; Walton-on-Thames, Surrey, England
- Died: 1 December 1988 (aged 92); Collingwood, Ontario, Canada
- Batting: Right-handed

Career statistics
Competition	First-class
Matches	1
Runs scored	53
Batting average	26.50
100s/50s	–/1
Top score	53
Catches/stumpings	–/–
- Source: Cricinfo, 2 June 2019

John Harold Strachan MC (8 March 1896 – 1 December 1988) was an English first-class cricketer and British Army officer.

The son of Walter Strachan, he was born at Walton-on-Thames on 8 March 1896, and was educated at Charterhouse School. His final year at Charterhouse coincided with the start of the First World War, and when he left he enlisted in the King's Own Scottish Borderers as a second lieutenant in March 1915. He was promoted to the rank of lieutenant in May 1917, antedated to July 1916. He was awarded the Military Cross for conspicuous gallantry and devotion to duty.

With the war now over, he later played a single first-class cricket match for the Free Foresters against Cambridge University at Fenner's in 1926. Batting twice in the match, he was dismissed without scoring by Leonard Irvine, while in their second-innings he was promoted up the order to open, scoring 53 runs before being dismissed by the same bowler. He later emigrated to Canada, where he died in December 1988 at Collingwood, Ontario.
