= Garrison Melmoth =

American homebuilt aircraft

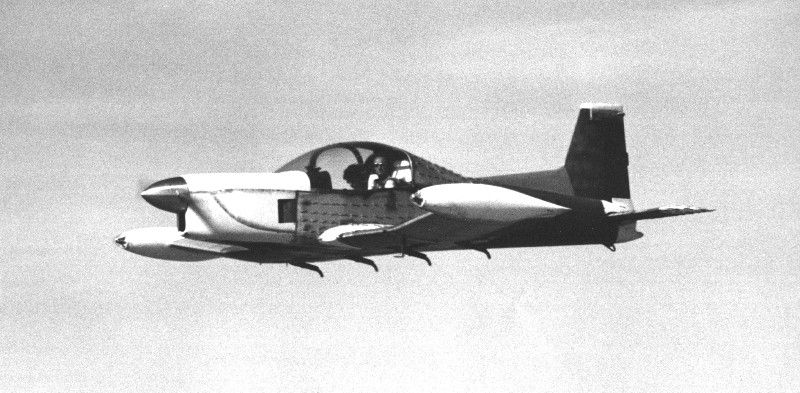
- The Melmoth undergoing initial test flying in its earliest configuration

General information
- Type: Homebuilt aircraft
- National origin: United States
- Designer: Peter Garrison
- Status: sole example destroyed 1982
- Number built: One

History
- First flight: 6 September 1973
- Developed from: Practavia Sprite
- Variant: Garrison Melmoth 2

The Garrison Melmoth was an American homebuilt aircraft that was designed and built by Peter Garrison. The project was commenced in 1968 and it first flew on 6 September 1973. The aircraft was designed and built from scratch, drawing on Garrison's previous experience working on the Practavia Sprite. The Melmoth was destroyed on the ground in 1982, when another aircraft hit it.

== Design and development ==
The aircraft was designed as a research project that would comply with the US Federal Aviation Administration (FAA) experimental-amateur-built rules. It featured a cantilever low wing, a two-seats-in-side-by-side configuration enclosed cockpit under a bubble canopy, retractable tricycle landing gear and a single engine in tractor configuration. Garrison spent over 10,000 hours building the aircraft.

Garrison explains how the aircraft's name was chosen, "I christened it Melmoth, after the Byronic protagonist of the nineteenth-century novel Melmoth the Wanderer, who sells his soul to the devil for, among other valuable considerations, the ability to travel about at will in space and time." Melmoth the Wanderer was written by Charles Maturin and published in 1820.

The aircraft was built from aluminium and incorporated exceptional fuel capacity for an amateur-built of its era, including two 35 U.S. gallons (130 L; 29 imp gal) wingtip tanks and a 41 U.S. gallons (160 L; 34 imp gal) main tank, with a total of 152 U.S. gallons (580 L; 127 imp gal) of fuel carried, giving a range of 3,400 mi (5,472 km). To make use of the long endurance an autopilot was fitted, for comfort the cockpit was 48 in (122 cm) in width. Its 23.083 ft (7.04 m) span rectangular wing with an aspect ratio of 6:1, employed an NACA 65A316 airfoil, mounted double-slotted flaps and adjustable-incidence ailerons. The engine was a Continental IO-360-A producing 210 hp (157 kW), driving a Hartzell constant speed propeller of 76 in (193 cm) diameter. Control was via center control sticks.

The Melmoth was registered with the US FAA in the Experimental-Amateur-built category.

Over time the aircraft was modified to include IFR avionics, an automatic fuel tank selection and cycling system, airbrakes, a stabilator T-tail, a turbocharged engine and built-in oxygen.

A follow-on design, the Garrison Melmoth 2, was commenced in August 1981 and first flew on 1 November 2002. The Melmoth 2 bears the same registration, N2MU, that the original aircraft wore.

== Operational history ==
The aircraft was intended for long flights and in 1974 Garrison and his partner Nancy Salter flew the Melmoth to Guatemala, a flight on which they became lost looking for Guatemala City. On 5 August 1975 Garrison and Salter flew from Gander, Newfoundland, to Shannon, Ireland, nonstop in about 11 hours. On 3 July 1976 the two flew from Cold Bay, Alaska, in the Aleutian Islands, to Chitose, Hokkaidō, Japan. In 1980 they flew to Mexico, Central and South America.

The Melmoth was destroyed in the summer of 1982 at John Wayne Airport in Orange County, California, when the pilot of a Cessna landing with engine problems lost control of the aircraft and it impacted the Melmoth waiting for takeoff clearance. Garrison reported, "its seven-foot propeller missed me by a foot, but chopped most of Melmoth into scraps". He went on to take note of the damage, "everything that I built was destroyed. Everything that I bought off somebody's shelf—the engine, the avionics, the instruments—survived...I kept the remains for a year, and then, after salvaging what I could, sold the empty hulk to a metal dealer to be shipped to Taiwan and converted into heaven knows what. He paid me $54.30 for it."

Melmoth is entombed in memory. We have two children now and much to do, and I rarely think about the old airplane, the 2,000 hours we spent in it, the 350,000 miles of prairie and ocean and mountain that slid beneath its white wings. Animals and men still live who heard it drone overhead and perhaps glanced upward; trees and stones remain that were once brushed by its shadow. They forget; but if I murmur the words "Two Mike Uniform" I can still feel the tremor of the roaring engine and sense the vast surrounding space of flight. I can resuscitate for a moment feeble shades of the fear and relief, the fine tension I would feel before flying and the lassitude afterward; and I can still taste the indefinable affection that filled me when, after hours of flying, with a final glance at the cooling airplane I slid shut the hangar door. - Peter Garrison

== Specifications (Melmoth) ==
Data from Plane and Pilot and Flying

General characteristics

- Crew: one
- Capacity: one passenger
- Length: 21 ft 4 in (6.50 m)
- Wingspan: 23 ft 1 in (7.04 m)
- Wing area: 94 sq ft (8.7 m^{2}) (configured with tip tanks)
- Aspect ratio: 6:1
- Airfoil: NACA 65A316
- Empty weight: 1,500 lb (680 kg)
- Gross weight: 2,800 lb (1,270 kg)
- Fuel capacity: 152 U.S. gallons (580 L; 127 imp gal)
- Powerplant: 1 × Continental IO-360-A six-cylinder, horizontally-opposed aircraft engine, 210 hp (160 kW)
- Propellers: 2-bladed Hartzell constant speed propeller, 6 ft 4 in (1.93 m) diameter

Performance

- Maximum speed: 211 mph (340 km/h, 183 kn)
- Cruise speed: 203 mph (327 km/h, 176 kn)
- Stall speed: 75 mph (121 km/h, 65 kn)
- Range: 3,400 mi (5,500 km, 3,000 nmi)
- Service ceiling: 21,000 ft (6,400 m)
- Rate of climb: 1,800 ft/min (9.1 m/s)

Avionics

- auto-pilot
