= Cranfield A1 =

A1 Eagle
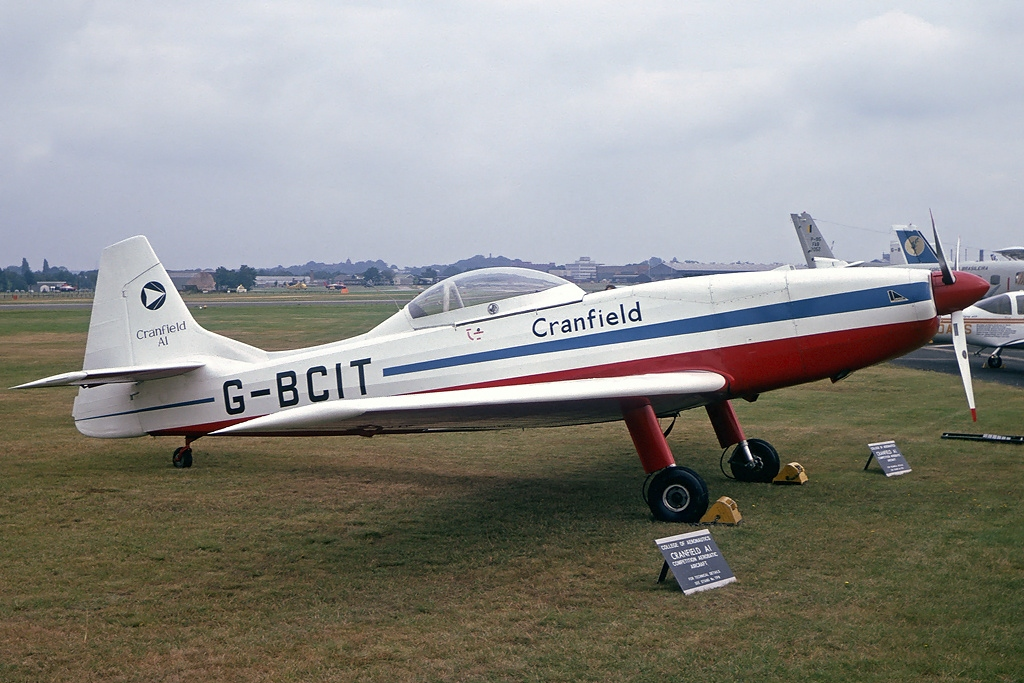

General information
- Type: Aerobatic monoplane
- National origin: United Kingdom
- Manufacturer: Cranfield Institute of Technology
- Status: in store
- Number built: 1

History
- First flight: 23 August 1976

The Cranfield A1 Eagle is a British single-seater aerobatics monoplane, powered by a flat-six engine. Two seats can be fitted for training purposes. Only one was built.

== Design and development ==
The A1 is a low-wing cantilever monoplane. The wing has straight edges, with sweep only on the leading edge, and squared tips. It is a single piece structure of light alloy construction, with Frise type mass balanced ailerons which are fabric covered aft of the spar; a ground adjustable trim tab is fitted on the port side. There are no flaps. The empennage is also straight tapered and of similar construction to the wing, though the rudder is fabric covered. There is a small dorsal fin. All rear control surfaces are horn balanced; the tailplane's incidence can be adjusted on the ground and the starboard elevator has a ground adjustable trim tab.

The fuselage is a mostly fabric covered welded tube structure with wooden formers, though the upper decking is plywood. The cockpit has a side hinged bubble canopy. Normally flown as a single seater, a second seat can be added for training. The fixed, conventional undercarriage is from a de Havilland Chipmunk, with hydraulic brakes in the wheels.

The A1's construction was delayed by funding problems: though design work began in 1968, the first flight was not made until 1976. By mid-1977 some 40 hours had been flown under the power of a 156 kW (210 hp) Rolls-Royce Continental IO-360-D. This was then replaced with a 209 kW (280 hp) Lycoming IO-540-D (Special) driving a three blade propeller which markedly improved the performance. Revised ailerons were fitted, the rudder horn balanced and heightened.

Only one aircraft (G-BCIT) was built and this remains in store at Cranfield in 2010.

== Specifications (Mk 2) ==
Data from Jane's All the World's Aircraft 1979-80

General characteristics

- Crew: One or two, latter training configuration)
- Length: 8.05 m (26 ft 5 in)
- Wingspan: 10.00 m (32 ft 10 in)
- Height: 2.70 m (8 ft 10 in)
- Wing area: 15.00 m^{2} (161.5 sq ft)
- Aspect ratio: 6.7
- Airfoil: NACA 23 series
- Gross weight: 850 kg (1,874 lb) for aerobatic flight
- Max takeoff weight: 1,000 kg (2,205 lb) two seats
- Powerplant: 1 × Lycoming IO-540-D (Special) air-cooled flat six, 210 kW (280 hp)
- Propellers: 3-bladed Hoffmann, 2.00 m (6 ft 7 in) diameter variable pitch

Performance

- Stall speed: 90 km/h (56 mph, 49 kn)
- Never exceed speed: 385 km/h (239 mph, 208 kn)
- Range: 200 km (120 mi, 110 nmi) with maximum fuel
- Endurance: 1 h 30 m
- Service ceiling: 5,000 m (16,000 ft)
- g limits: +7/-5 C of A, August 1978
- Rate of climb: 11.1 m/s (2,190 ft/min)
- Take-off run: 170 m (558 ft)
- Landing run: 200 m (660 ft)
