= Nicholas Roe =

British academic and literary critic

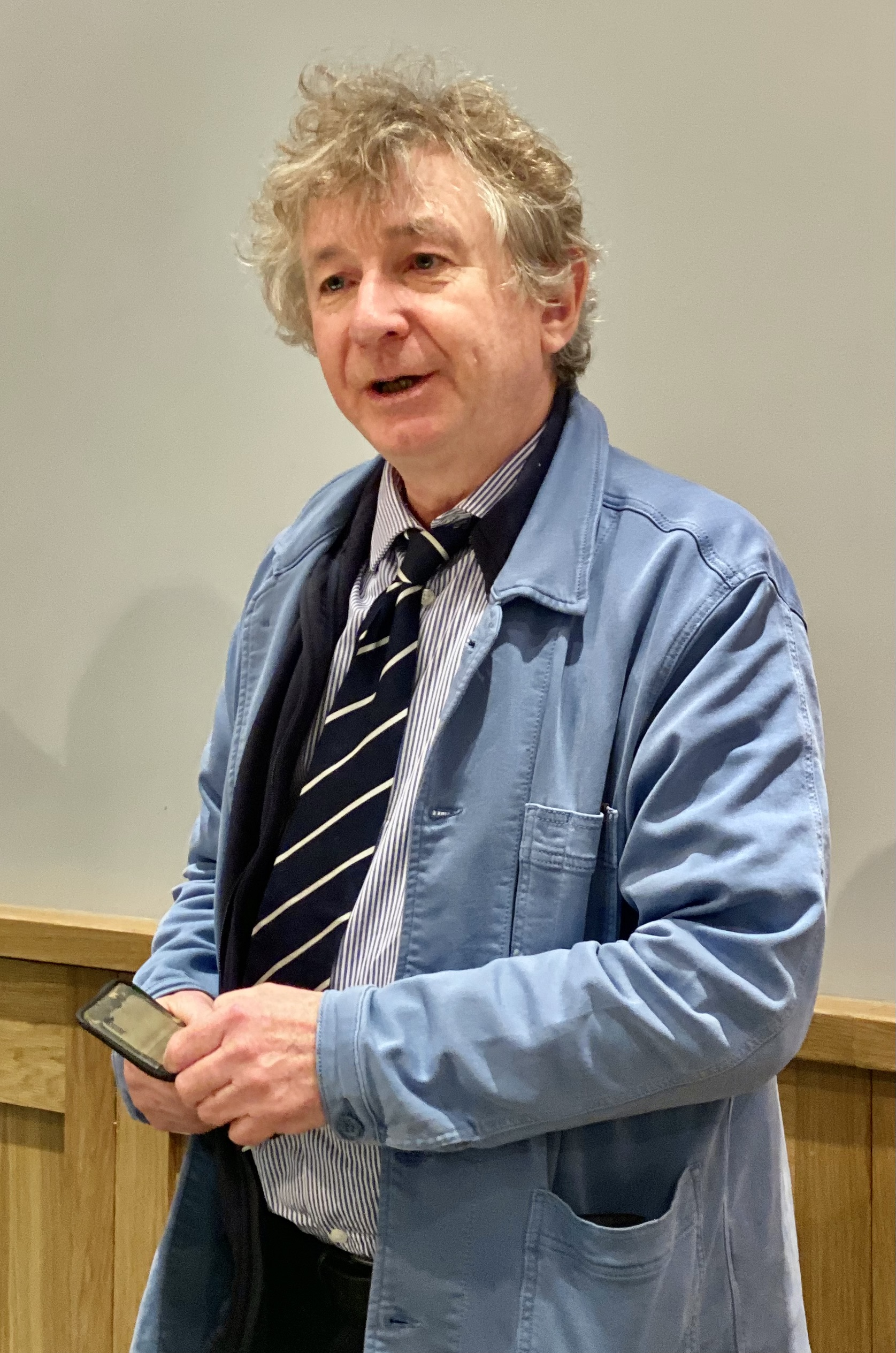
- Nicholas Roe (2022)

Nicholas Hugh Roe, FBA, FRSE (born 14 December 1955) is a scholar of English literature and an academic, specialising in romantic literature and culture. Since 1996, he has been Professor of English Literature at the University of St Andrews. After completing his undergraduate degrees and doctorate at Trinity College, Oxford, Roe joined St Andrews as a lecturer in English in 1985; he was promoted to reader in 1993.

== Honours ==
In 2009, Roe was elected Fellow of the Royal Society of Edinburgh (FRSE). In July 2017, he was elected a Fellow of the British Academy (FBA), the United Kingdom's national academy for the humanities and social sciences.

== Selected works ==
- (editor with Richard Gravil and Lucy Newlyn) Coleridge's Imagination (Cambridge University Press, 1985).
- (editor) William Wordsworth: Selected Poetry (Penguin, 1992).
- The Politics of Nature: William Wordsworth and Some Contemporaries (Macmillan, 1992).
- Wordsworth and Coleridge: The Radical Years (Oxford University Press, 1988).
- Keats and History (Cambridge University Press, 1995).
- John Keats and the Culture of Dissent (Oxford University Press, 1997).
- (editor) Samuel Taylor Coleridge and the Sciences of Life (Oxford University Press, 2001).
- (editor) Leigh Hunt: Life, Poetics, Politics (Routledge, 2003).
- Fiery Heart: The First Life of Leigh Hunt (Pimlico, 2005).
- (editor) Romanticism: An Oxford Guide (Oxford University Press, 2005).
- (editor) English Romantic Writers and the West Country (Palgrave, 2010).
- John Keats. A New Life (Yale University Press, 2012).
