= John Strachan (professor) =

John Strachan FRHS, FRAS, FRSA (born April 1961), is a literary critic, historian and poet, Professor of English and Pro Vice-Chancellor at Bath Spa University, England. Strachan is the current Director of GuildHE Research, and Co-Chair of the Charles Lamb Society. He is active in global higher education, being an Ambassador for the Association of Commonwealth Universities, a Trustee of the Royal Commonwealth Society, Bath, and, since 2023, Chair of the South West and Wales Africa Research Network. Strachan is a Visiting Professor at Adamas University, Kolkata. He was also Chief External Examiner at the Arab Open University, from 2020 to 2025.

John Strachan was Dean of the School of Humanities and Cultural Industries at Bath Spa (2013-2015), and has previously held professorships at Northumbria University (2011-2013) and the University of Sunderland (1993-2011). He has also taught at St Edmund Hall, Oxford (1992-1993). Strachan has been a Senior Research Fellow of the British Academy and is Associate Editor of the Oxford Companion to English Literature. Educated at the University of Southampton (BA) and Wolfson College, Oxford (MPhil, DPhil), Strachan specialises in Romanticism, especially late Georgian comic writing (he is the editor of British Satire 1785-1840 (2003) and Parodies of the Romantic Age (1999), and the relationship between advertising and literature, the subject of his monographs Advertising and Satirical Culture (Cambridge University Press, 2007), and, with Claire Nally, Advertising, Literature and Print Culture in Ireland, 1891-1922 (Palgrave Macmillan, 2012). He has published three volumes of poetry and, with the late Richard Terry, is author of a widely-used text book,Poetry, published in 2000 (second edition, 2011) by Edinburgh University Press. Strachan has also published numerous articles in the fields of history, sport studies, poetry, and Irish culture. In 2013 he collaborated with numerous artists and poets to create Their Colours and their Forms: Artists' Responses to Wordsworth, an exhibition at the Wordsworth Trust, Grasmere, which included some of his own poetry. He lives in Bath, Somerset. As an author, he is widely held in libraries worldwide.

== Selected bibliography ==
Volumes of Poetry

- Echoes of Love and Place: A Collection of Arabic and English Poems and their Translation, with Aziz Thabit Saeed, BSUP/AOU, 2024
- Sunderland Gig, livre d'artistes, Queen of Dart Press, with Michael Pennie, 2021
- Waterloo: The Field of Blood. Poems, Art Editions North, 2015

Monographs

- Advertising, Literature and Print Culture in Ireland, 1891-1922, co-author with Claire Nally, Palgrave Macmillan, 2012
- Advertising and Satirical Culture in the Romantic Period, Cambridge University Press, 2007

Scholarly Editions

- Blackwood's Magazine, 1817-25: Selections from Maga's Infancy, volume editor, Pickering and Chatto, 2006
- British Satire 1785-1840, 5 vols, general editor, Pickering and Chatto, 2003
- Leigh Hunt: Poetical Works, 2 vols, editor, Pickering and Chatto, 2003
- Parodies of the Romantic Age, 5 vols, co-general editor, Pickering and Chatto, 1999

Textbooks

- Poetry, co-author with Richard Terry, second edition, Edinburgh University Press, 2011
- Key Concepts in Romantic Literature, co-author with Jane Moore, Palgrave Macmillan, 2010
- A Routledge Literary Sourcebook on the Poems of John Keats, Routledge, 2003

Edited Volumes

- Songs of Place and Time: Birdsong and the Dawn Chorus in Natural History and the Arts, Gaia Project, co-editor with Mike Collier and Bennett Hogg, 2020
- Charles Robert Maturin, Roman Catholicism and Melmoth the Wanderer, Reimagining Ireland (Vol 38), Peter Lang, 2013
- Ireland at War and Peace, co-editor with Alison O'Malley-Younger, Cambridge Scholars Publishing, 2011
- Ireland: Revolution and Evolution, co-editor with Alison O'Malley-Younger, Peter Lang, 2010
- The Oxford Companion to English Literature, 7th edition, general editor Dinah Birch, associate editor for Romanticism, Oxford University Press, 2009
- Essays on Modern Irish Literature, co-editor with Alison O'Malley-Younger, Sunderland University Press, 2007

Exhibition Catalogues

- Wordsworth/Basho: Walking Poets, Art Editions North/ Kakimori Bunko, co-editor with Mike Collier, 2016
- Their Colours and their Forms: Artists' Responses to Wordsworth, co-editor with Carol McKay, 2013, Wordsworth Trust, 2013
