= Glossary of Russian and USSR aviation acronyms =

Russian aviation acronyms

These glossaries of acronyms and initials are used for aero-engines and aircraft equipment by the Russian Federation and formerly the USSR. The Latin-alphabet names are phonetic representations of the Cyrillic originals, and variations are inevitable.

The glossary has been arranged into the following separate articles:

- Glossary of Russian and USSR aviation acronyms: Aircraft designations
- Glossary of Russian and USSR aviation acronyms: Avionics and instruments
- Glossary of Russian and USSR aviation acronyms: Engines and equipment
- Glossary of Russian and USSR aviation acronyms: Miscellaneous
- Glossary of Russian and USSR aviation acronyms: Organisations
- Glossary of Russian and USSR aviation acronyms: Weapons and armament
