= Glossary of Russian and USSR aviation acronyms: Weapons and armament =

This is a glossary of acronyms and initials used for aircraft weapons in the Russian Federation and formerly the USSR. The Latin-alphabet names are phonetic representations of the Cyrillic originals, and variations are inevitable.

== Aircraft guns ==
2A42

30 mm cannon

9A622

7.62 mm four-barrelled machine-gun

9A623

30 mm twin-barrelled cannon a.k.a. AO-17 and GSh-30/II

9A624

12.7 mm four-barrelled machine-gun

9A4071K

30 mm cannon a.k.a. GSh-30-1 and TKB-687

A

AM

N.M. Afansa'yev & N.F. Makarov

AO

APK

Aviatsionnaya Pushka Kurchevsky – aircraft cannon Kurchevsky

B

Berezin. A 12.7mm caliber machine gun used in

BNT

Berezin NT.

BS

[poolemyot] Berezina Sinkhronnyy - Berezin's synchronised machine-gun

DA

[poolemyot] Degtyaryova Aviatsionnyy - Degtyaryov machine-gun for aircraft

DRP

DinámoReaktívnaya Púshka - динамореактивная пушка, ДPП - recoilless rifle/cannon

GP

Gondola Pushechnaya – cannon pod

GSh

Gryazev & Shipoonov

K

1. Kompleks [Vo'orouzheniya] – weapons system
2. (suffix) Kroopnokalibernyy – large calibre
3. (suffix) Kryl'yevoy – wing mounted

L

(suffix) Lafetnaya – for permanent mounting

M

(suffix) Motornaya – engine mounted

MP

Motornaya Pushka – engine mounted cannon

MPSh

Motornaya Pushka Shpital'novo – Shpital'nyy engine mounted cannon

MV

Mozharovsky-Venevidov turret gun Georgy Mozharovsky & Ivan Venevidov

N

A.E. Nudelman

NR

Aircraft cannon designed by A.E. Nudelman & A.A. Rikhter

NS

Aircraft cannon designed by A.E. Nudelman & Suranov.

OKB-15

PKT

PTB

Pushka Taubin-Baburin - cannon Taubin-Baburin (both Taubin & Baburin were executed for their guns {MP-3 / MP-6 / PTB-6 / PTB-23 / Taubin 23} failure, apparently)

PV

Poolemyot Vozdooshnyy – machine-gun for aircraft 7.62mm machine gun based on Maxim machine gun by A. Nadashkevich & Feodor Tokarev

S

(suffix) Sinkronayah - synchronised

Sh

Boris Shpital'nyy

ShFK

Shpital'nyy FK

ShKAS

[poolemyot] Shpitahl'novi i Komarnitskovi Aviatsionny, Skorostrel'nyy - Shpital'nyy/Komarnitskii rapid firing machine gun

ShVAK

Shpital'nyy/Vladimirov Aviatsionny Krupnokalibernaya - Shpital'nyy/Komarnitskii large calibre aircraft cannon

SPPU

Samoletnaya Podvesnaya Pushechnaya Ustanovka – aircraft gun pod

TKB

Tool'skoye Konstrooktorskoye Byuro – Tula design bureau see AM-23

UBK

Ooniversal'nyy [poolemyot] Berezina K - M. Berezin 12.7mm machine-gun

UBS

Ooniversalny Berezina [poolemyot] Sinkhronnyy- M. Berezin synchronised 12.7mm machine-gun

UBT

Ooniversalny Berezina [poolemyot] Turel'ny - M. Berezin turret 12.7mm machine-gun

Ultra ShKAS

: Ultra [poolemyot] Shpitahl'novi i Komarnitskovi Aviatsionny, Skorostrel'nyy – Ultra Shpital'nyy/Komarnitskii rapid firing machine gun- 7.62mm machine-gun

UPK

Unifitcirovanny Pushechny Konteiner – universal gun pod

VYa

Volkov-Yartcev

== Bombs, turrets, etc ==
A

torpedo

AG

Aviatsionnykh Granaht - aviation grenades

AgitAB

Aghitatsionnaya AviaBomba - psychological warfare/propaganda in the form of 'leaflet bombs'

AK

- chemical bomblet for cluster bomb

AMD

- anti shipping mine

APM

- anti shipping mine

ARS

Aviatsionny Raketny Snaryad – aircraft unguided rocket

ARS

Aviatsionny Reaktivnii Snaryad – high velocity aircraft rocket

ARGS

Aktivnaya Rahdiolokatsionnaya Golvka Samonavedeniya – active radar seeker head

ASO

- chaff and flare dispenser

AT

Aviatsionnaya Torpeda - anti submarine torpedoes

AVA

(suffix) - torpedo

BetAB

- retarded/rocket-assisted runway cratering bomb

BLUB

Blisternaya Oostanovka Berezina – Berezin's blister mount

BrAB

Broneboynaya AviaBomba – armour-piercing bomb

DAG

Derzhatel' Aviatsionnykh Granaht – container aviation grenade

DAB

Dymovaya AviaBomba - smoke bomb

DB

Distantsionno [oopravlyayemaya] Bahshnya – remote-controlled turret

DK

- turret

DOSAB

Dnev-naya Orienteerno-Signahl'naya AviaBomba - day marker/signal flare bombs

DV-AB

- smoke bomb

FAB

Fugahsnaya AviaBomba - high explosive bomb

FotAB

Fotograficheskaya AviaBomba – photo flash bomb

FZAB

Foogahsno-Zazhigahtel'naya Aviabomba - high explosive/incendiary bomb

HCN

- chemical weapon

IAB

Imitatsionnaya Aviabomba - high explosive/incendiary bomb

IGDM

- anti shipping mine

K

1. (suffix) Kassetnaya bomba – cluster bomb
2. Kompleks [Vo'orouzheniya] – weapons system
3. Kormovaya [strekovaya oostanovka] – tail barbette Il-28 a.k.a. Il-K-6

KAB

1. Korrekteeruyemaya AviaBomba – guided depth charge
2. Korrekteeruyemaya AviaBomba - guided bomb

KD

- cassette bomb dispenser

KDB

Kormovaya Distantsionno [Oopravlyayemaya] Bahshnya – dorsal remote-controlled turret

KG

- turret

Kh

- air-to-surface missile

KhAB

- chemical weapon phosgene also ChAB

KMGU

KonteinerMalykhGruzov Universalny – small weapons carrier pod CBLS

KU

Kormovaya Oostanovka – rear [defensive armament] installation a.k.a. Il-KU3 Il-22

KRAB

KorrekteeRuyemaya AviaBomba - guided bomb 1948 IR guided bomb

KSR

- anti-shipping missile

L

(suffix) Lazernoe navedeniye – Laser guidance

LU

Lyookovaya Oostanovka – hatch [defensive armament] installation

MAN

(suffix) [torpeda] Modernizeerovannaya Aviatsionnaya Nizhkovysotnaya – modernised aircraft torpedo for low-altitude attacks

MV

- turret for Il-2 – Mozharovskiy and Venevidov

N

- nuclear weapon

NDB

Nizhnyaya verkhnyaya Distantsionno oopravlyaaemaya Bahshnya – ventral remote controlled turret

NOSAB

Nochnaya Orieynteerno-Signahl'naya AviaBomba - night marker/signal flare bombs

NOV-AB

- non-persistent agent dispenser

NT

(suffix) Nizkoye Torpedometahniye – low altitude torpedo attack

NU

- cannon mount for Il-102

OD

(suffix) Omno-Detoneeruyushchaya – volume detonation bomb [fuel/air bomb]

ODAB

Omno-Detoneeruyushchaya AviaBomba – volume detonation bomb [fuel/air bomb]

OFAB

Oskolochno Fugasnaya AviaBomba – fragmentation high explosive bomb

OFZAB

Oskolochno Fugasnaya-Zazhigahtel'naya AviaBomba – fragmentation/high explosive/incendiary bomb

OMAB

Oryenteerno-Markernaya AviaBomba – maritime marker bombs

ORO

Odinochnoye Reaktivnoye Oroodiye – single rocket gun ORO-82 - tube launcher for TRS-82

P

Prakticheskaya [aviabomba] - practice bomb

PLAB

Protivolodochaya AviaBomba - depth charge/anti-submarine bombs

PROSAB

1. - parachute flare
2. Protivosamolyotnaya AviaBomba - anti-aircraft bomb

PS

Pritsel'naya Stahntsiya – sighting station

PTAB

Protivitahnkovaya AviaBomba - armour piercing bomblets

PTK

- hollow-charge bomblet for cluster bomb

PUL

- synchroniser

R

1. Raketa – air-to-air missile [rocket]
2. (suffix) Rahdiolokatsionnaya [Golovka Samonavedniya] – radar seeker head

RAT

Raketnaya Aviatsionnaya Torpeda - rocket propelled torpedo

RBK

Razovaya Bombovaya Kasseta - cluster bomb dispenser

RDS

- nuclear weapon

RGB

Rahdio-Ghidroakoosticheskiy Booy - sonobuoy

RGB-N

Rahdio-Ghidroakoosticheskiy Booy N - sonobuoy

RPK

- fragmentation bomblet for cluster bomb

RRAB

- incendiary bomblet for cluster bomb

RS

1. Reaktivny Snaryad - rocket projectiles
2. - Radar homing

S

Snaryad - rocket

SAB

Svetyashchaya AviaBomba – flare bomb

ShOAB

Sharikovaya Oskolochnaya AviaBomba - pellet bomb/bomblet

SOV-AB

- persistent agent dispenser

SPV

Sistema Pushechnovo Vo'oroozheniya – defensive armament system

T

(suffix) Teplovaya [golovka samonavedeniya] – Infra-Red seeker head

TsOSAB

Tsvetnaya Orieynteerno-Signahl'naya AviaBomba - coloured marker/signal flare bombs

TAS

- torpedo

TAV

- torpedo

TK

(suffix) Televizionno-Komahndnoye navedeniye – TV guidance

TN

- nuclear weapon

Toxic-B

- chemical weapon

TOZ

- torpedo

TR

(suffix) Televizionno-Korreyatsionnoye Samonavedeniye – TV correlated guidance

TRS

ToorboReaktivnyy Snaryad – [turbo-jet projectile] rocket projectiles

TsOSAB

Tsvetnaya oriyenteerno-Signahl'naya AviaBomba – coloured marker/signal flare bombs

TUM

- dorsal powered turret

UB

1.Oonifitseerovannyy Blok – universal [standardised] pod
2. - rocket pod
3. Oopravlyayermaya Bomba – guided bomb

UBSh

- experimental defensive installation- Il-2

UkhAP

- chemical warfare liquid dispensers

UTK

- turret for Il-4 I. Shebanov

VAP

Vylivnoy Aviatsionny Pribor - chemical weapon dispenser

VDB

Verkhnyaya Distantsionno [Oopravlyayemaya] Bahshnya – dorsal remote-controlled turret

VT

(suffix) Vysotnoye Torpedometahniye – high altitude torpedo attack

VU

Verkhnyaya [Strelkovaya] Oostanovka – dorsal turret Il-10/Il-20

VUB

Verkhnyaya [Strelkovaya] Oostanovka Bombardirovshchika – remote controlled dorsal turret for bombers

ZAB

Zazhigahtel'naya Aviabomba - incendiary bomb

ZAP

Zazhigahtel'naya AP - incendiary bomb dispenser

ZB

Zazhigahtel'nyy Bahk - incendiary [napalm] tanks

== See also ==
- Glossary of Russian and USSR aviation acronyms: Aircraft designations
- Glossary of Russian and USSR aviation acronyms: Avionics and instruments
- Glossary of Russian and USSR aviation acronyms: Engines and equipment
- Glossary of Russian and USSR aviation acronyms: Miscellaneous
- Glossary of Russian and USSR aviation acronyms: Organisations
- Glossary of Russian and USSR aviation acronyms: Weapons and armament

== Sources ==
- Gordon, Yefim. Early Soviet Jet Bombers. Hinkley, Midland. 2004. ISBN 1-85780-181-4
- Gordon, Yefim. Early Soviet Jet Fighters. Hinkley, Midland. 2002. ISBN 1-85780-139-3
- Gordon, Yefim. Sukhoi Interceptors. Hinkley, Midland. 2004. ISBN 1-85780-180-6
- Gordon, Yefim. Soviet Rocket Fighters. Hinkley, Midland. 2006. ISBN 1-85780-245-4 / ISBN 978-1-85780-245-0
- Gordon, Yefim. Soviet Heavy Interceptors. Hinkley, Midland. 2004. ISBN 1-85780-191-1
- Gordon, Yefim. Lavochkin's Last Jets. Hinkley, Midland. 2004. ISBN 1-85780-253-5 / ISBN 978-1-85780-253-5
- Gordon, Yefim & Komissarov, Dmitry & Komissarov, Sergey. OKB Ilyushin. Hinkley, Midland. 2004. ISBN 1-85780-187-3
- Gunston, Bill. The Osprey Encyclopaedia of Russian Aircraft 1875–1995. London, Osprey. 1995. ISBN 1-85532-405-9
- Antonov, Vladimir & Gordon, Yefim & others. OKB Sukhoi. Leicester. Midland. 1996. ISBN 1-85780-012-5
- Gordon, Yefim. Komissarov, Dmitry & Sergey. OKB Yakovlev. Hinkley. Midland. 2005. ISBN 1-85780-203-9
- Gordon, Yefim & Komissarov, Dmitry. OKB Mikoyan. Hinkley, Midland. 2009. ISBN 978-1-85780-307-5
- Gordon, Yefim. Komissarov, Dmitry & Sergey. OKB Ilyushin. Hinkley. Midland. 2004. ISBN 1-85780-187-3
- Gordon, Yefim & Rigmant, Vladimir. Tupolev Tu-144. Midland. Hinkley. 2005. ISBN 1-85780-216-0 ISBN 978 185780 216 0
- Gordon, Yefim & Komissarov, Dmitry. Antonov An-12. Midland. Hinkley. 2007. ISBN 1-85780-255-1 ISBN 978 1 85780 255 9
- Gordon, Yefim & Komissarov, Dmitry & Komissarov, Sergey. Mil's Heavylift Helicopters. Hinkley, Midland. 2005. ISBN 1-85780-206-3
- Gordon, Yefim. Tupolev Tu-160 "Blackjack". Hinkley, Midland. 2003. ISBN 1-85780-147-4
- Gordon, Yefim & Komissarov, Dmitry. Antonov's Jet Twins. Hinkley, Midland. 2005. ISBN 1-85780-199-7
- Gordon, Yefim & Komissarov, Dmitry. Kamov Ka-27/-32 Family. Hinkley, Midland. 2006. ISBN 1-85780-237-3 ISBN 978 1 85780 237 5
- Gordon, Yefim & Komissarov, Dmitry. Antonov An-2. Midland. Hinkley. 2004. ISBN 1-85780-162-8
- Gordon, Yefim & Rigmant, Vladimir. Tupolev Tu-114. Midland. Hinkley. 2007. ISBN 1-85780-246-2 ISBN 978 1 85780 246 7
- Gordon, Yefim & Komissarov, Dmitry. Ilyushin Il-12 and Il-14. Midland. Hinkley. 2005. ISBN 1-85780-223-3 ISBN 978 1 85780 223 8
- Gordon, Yefim. Yakovlev Yak-36, Yak-38 & Yak-41. Midland. Hinkley. 2008. ISBN 978-1-85780-287-0
- Gordon, Yefim. Komissarov, Dmitry & Sergey. Antonov's Turboprop Twins. Hinkley. Midland. 2003. ISBN 1-85780-153-9
- Gordon, Yefim. Myasischev M-4 and 3M. Hinkley. Midland. 2003. ISBN 1-85780-152-0
- Gordon, Yefim & Rigmant, Vladimir. Tupolev Tu-104. Midland. Hinkley. 2007. ISBN 978-1-85780-265-8
- Gordon, Yefim. Komissarov, Dmitry. Mil Mi-8/Mi-17. Hinkley. Midland. 2003. ISBN 1-85780-161-X
- Gordon, Yefim & Dexter, Kieth Polikarpov's I-16 Fighter. Hinkley. Midland. 2001. ISBN 1-85780-131-8
- Gordon, Yefim. Mikoyan MiG-25 "Foxbat". Hinkley. Midland. 2007. ISBN 1-85780-259-4 ISBN 978 1 85780 259 7
- Gordon, Yefim & Dexter, Kieth Mikoyan's Piston-Engined Fighters. Hinkley. Midland. 2003. ISBN 1-85780-160-1
- Gordon, Yefim & Rigmant, Vladimir. Tupolev Tu-4. Midland. Hinkley. 2002. ISBN 1-85780-142-3
- Gordon, Yefim. Sukhoi S-37 and Mikoyan MFI. Midland. Hinkley. 2001 reprinted 2006. ISBN 1-85780-120-2 ISBN 978 1 85780 120 0
- Gordon, Yefim. Khazanov, Dmitry. Yakovlev's Piston-Engined Fighters. Hinkley. Midland. 2002. ISBN 1-85780-140-7
- Gordon, Yefim. Sal'nikov, Andrey. Zablotsky, Aleksandr. Beriev's Jet Flying Boats. Hinkley. Midland. 2006. ISBN 1-85780-236-5 ISBN 978 1 85780 236 8
- Gordon, Yefim. & Dexter, Keith. Polikarpov's Biplane Fighters. Hinkley. Midland Publishing. 2002. ISBN 1-85780-141-5
- Gordon, Yefim. Soviet/Russian Aircraft Weapons. Midland. 2004. ISBN 1-85780-188-1
