= Ministry of Civil Aviation (Soviet Union) =

Government ministry in the Soviet Union

Ministry of Civil Aviation of the USSR
- Russian: Министерство гражданской авиации СССР; Russian: МГА СССР

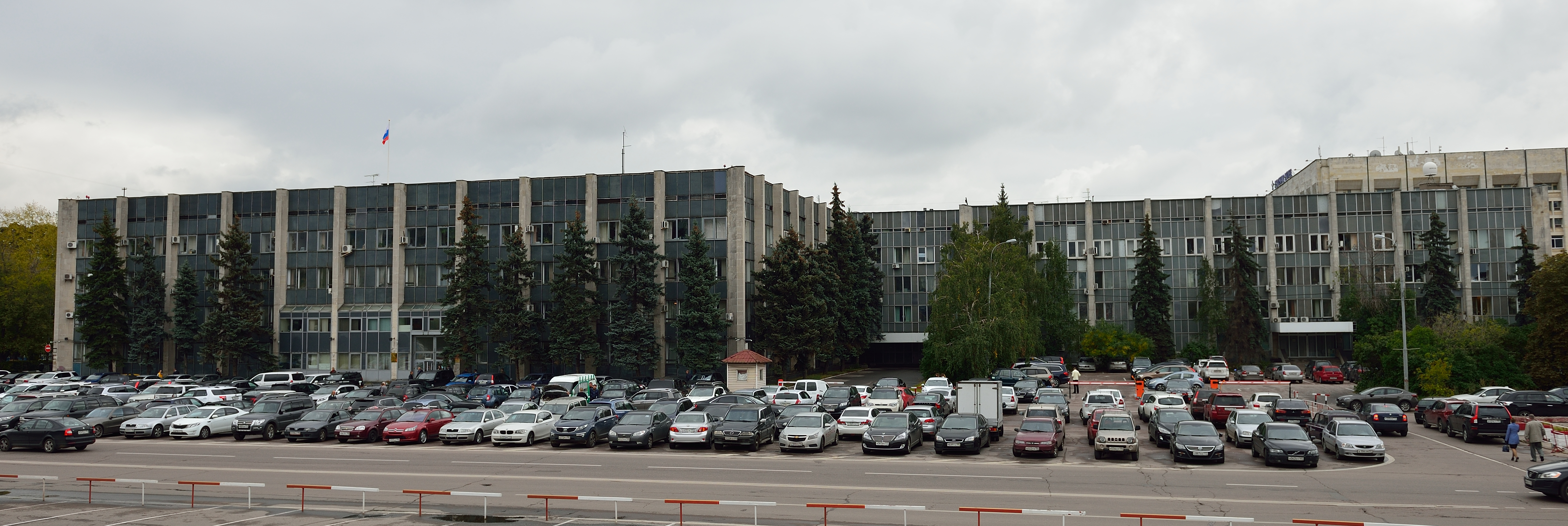
- Ministry headquarters in Moscow

Ministry overview
- Formed: July 28, 1964
- Dissolved: April 10, 1992
- Jurisdiction: Government of the Soviet Union
- Headquarters: building 37 at Leningradsky Prospekt, Moscow, USSR
- Ministers responsible: Yevgeni Loginov; Boris Bugayev; Aleksandr Volkov; Boris Panjukov

The Ministry of Civil Aviation (MGA SSSR for Russian: МГА СССР - Министерство гражданской авиации СССР) was a government ministry in the Soviet Union.

Formed in 1964 from the Main Administration for the Civil Airfleet in the Ministry of Defense, MGA provided commercial passenger and cargo service under the Aeroflot brand as well as agricultural and other aerial works.

== MGA SSSR ministers ==
- Yevgeni Loginov (28.7.1964 – 20.5.1970)
- Boris Bugayev (20.5.1970 – 4.5.1987)
- Aleksandr Volkov (4.5.1987 – 29.3.1990)
- Boris Panjukov (18.4.1990 – 28.8.1991)

== See also ==
- Glossary of Russian and USSR aviation acronyms
