= Glossary of Russian and USSR aviation acronyms: Engines and equipment =

This is a glossary of acronyms and initials used for aero-engines and aircraft equipment in the Russian Federation and formerly the USSR. The Latin-alphabet names are phonetic representations of the Cyrillic originals, and variations are inevitable.

== Aero engines ==
AD

Aviadvigatel - Aircraft engine

APD

- Accessories gearbox

AT

Avtomaht Tyaghi - auto-throttle

AV

Avtomaticheskiy vint – automatic pitch [propeller]

BR

(suffix) Bezredooktornyy - no reduction gearbox [direct-drive]

BSP

- surge prevention system

BU

- booster

D

Dvigatel - engine

DM

Dopolnityel'nyi Motor – supplementary motor

DN

- diesel Novikov

DPD

- supplementary lift engine

DTRD

Dvukhkonturnyi Turboreaktivnyi Dvigatel – twin-spool gas turbine engine

DV

-

E

(suffix) Ekonomichnyi - economical

F

(suffix) Forseerovannyi - uprated

GTD

Gelikopternyi Turbo-Dvigatel' - helicopter turboshaft

GTE

-

K

(suffix/prefix) Korotkoresoorsnyi – short service life

KhZ

Khimicheskoye Zazhigahniye – chemical ignition

M

Motornyi – prefix used for many piston engines prior to use of OKB names [ca. 1940]

MG

-

MM

-

MV

-

N

Neftyanoy - of crude oil type (diesel engines)

NII

-

OR

Opeetnaya Raketa – experimental rocket engine

ORM

Opeetnyi Reaktivnyi Motor – experimental reaction motor

P

-

PD

- piston engine

PRD

Porokhovoy Raketnyi Dvigatel – gunpowder rocket motor

PSR

Porokhovaya Startovaya Raketa – solid fuel rocket booster

PuVRD

- pulsejet

PVRD

- Ramjet

R

(suffix) Redooktornyi - geared

R

Reaktivnyi – jet-propelled

RED

- digital control unit FADEC

RD

Reaktivnyy Dvigatel – jet engine

RDA

-

RDK

-

RMZ

-

RTD

Reaktivnyi Dvigatel – jet engine

RTK

(suffix) Regoolator Toorbokompressora – Turbo-charger regulator

RN

(suffix) -

RNV

(suffix) -

RTWD

-

S

(suffix) Sdoov [Pogranichnovo Sloya] – boundary layer blowing/control

S

Stendovyy – test-bed engine

SIOD

Sistema Izmereniya Otnosheniya Davleniya – pressure-ratio measurement system

SPRD

Startovyi Porohovoi Raketny Dvigatel – RATOG rocket-assisted take-off gear / JATO jet assisted take-off

TA

- APU

TK

(suffix) Toorbokompressor - turbocharger

TKRD

Toorbokompressor Reaktivnyy Dvigatel – gas Turbine reaction engine

TR

Toorboreaktivnyi [Dvigatel] – turbojet engine

TRD

- jet engine

TRDD

- twin-spool turbojet

TV

ToorboVintovoy – turboprop/turboshaft

TVD

ToorboVintovoy Dvigatel – turboprop engine

TvRDD

- turbofan

TVVD

- Propfan

U

- booster

VFSh

Vint F Shaga – variable-pitch propeller

VISh

Vint Izmenyayemovo Shaga – constant speed propeller

VPSh

Vint Postoyannovo Shaga - fixed itch propeller

VRD

Vozdooshno-Reaktivnyy Dvigatel – air reaction engine

VRDK

Vozdushno-Reaktivny Dvigatel Kompressornyi – air reaction compressor jet

VV

Vozdooshnyy Vint - airscew / propeller

ZhRD

Zhidkostnyi Reaktivnyy Dvigatel – liquid fuelled rocket engine

== Aero engine design bureaux ==
ACh

Aleksei Dmitriyevich Charomskii

AI

Aleksandr Ivchyenko

AL

Arkhip Mikhailovich Lyul'ka

AM

Mikulin

AMBS

Mikulin & B.S. Stechkin

ASh

Arkadiya Dmitriyevich Shvetsov

DM

Merkulov engines

PS

Soloviev engines

BD

S. S. Balandin

MB

Aleksei Mikhailovich dobrotvorskii

NK

Nikolai Dmitriyevich Kuznetsov

PS

Soloviev [Aviadvigatel]

VD

Dobrynin engines

VK

Klimov engines

== Equipment ==
AFA

1.AFA (AeroFotoApparaht – aerial camera)
2. AviatsionnyFotoApparaht - large reconnaissance cameras)

AFUS

AeroFotoUStanovka – aerial camera mount)

AK

- engine driven compressor

AKAFU

Avtomaticheskaya Kachayushchayasya AeroFotoUstanovka – automatic tilting camera mount

AKU

Aviatsionnaya Katapool'tnaya Oostnovka – aircraft mounted ejector

AKS

- hand driven cine camera

AMG

Aviasionnoye Mahslo Ghidravlicheskoye – aviation hydraulic fluid

APO

Aviatsionnyy Protivopozharnnyy Opryskivatel – airborne fire-fighting sprayer

APU

Aviatsionnoye Pooskovoye Oostroystvo - missile launch rail

APU-O

Aviatsionnaya Pooskovay Oostanovka, Odinochnaya [dlya snaryadov kalibra] 212 milimetrov – aircraft mounted launcher, single, for 212mm HVAR's

ARD

Avtomaticheskiy Regoolyator Davleniya – automatic pressure regulator

ART

Avtomaticheskiy Regoolyator Temperatoory – automatic temperature regulator

ASO

Avtomaht Sbrosa Otrazhahteley – automatic chaff and flare dispenser

AZS

- fire suppression system

BANO

- navigation lights

BD

1. Bahloochnyy Derzhahtel' - beam type [weapons] rack
2. BomboDertchatel – bomb rack

BL

- cargo winch

BLM

BL Mishen - target winch

BLT

- target winch

BM

Booksirooyemaya Mishen – towed target

BO

Bortovoy Obogrevahtel' – on-board [gasoline] cabin heater

BVP

Blok Vybrosa Pomekh – interference ejector 'Chuff & Fluff'

Der

Derzhahtel' - holder

DK

Desahntnaya Kabina – assault trooper cabin

Dnevnaya Fotorazvedka

Type D daylight reconnaissance pod

DOS

Derzhahtel' Osvetitel'nykh Sredstv – racks for means of illumination (flare bomb cassette)

DR

DoRazvedchik – auxiliary reconnaissance drone/aircraft

Dya-ss

Derzhatel' yahshchichnyy Sredstv Signalizahtsii – box-type rack for signal means

EKSP

Elektricheskaya Kasseta Signahl'nykh Patronov - electric signal flare launcher)

EKSR

Elektricheskaya Kasseta Signahl'nykh R - electric signal flare launcher

EMI

- multi-function engine indicators

Esbr

Elektrichesky Sbrasyvatel – electric bomb release device

FARM

- photo-recording module

FS

- landing/taxi light

FRS

- retractable landing/taxi lamps

FUGOG

- fire extinguisher bottle

GL

Groozvaya Lebyodka - Cargo winch

GNP

- hydraulic pump

GO

Ghenerahtor Odnofahznyy - generator

GSh

GhermoShlem - pressure helmet

GSK

- generator

GSN

- generator

GSR

- generator

GT

- generator

GTD

Gelikopter Turbo-Dvigatyel – helicopter turbine engine

I

(suffix) Instrooktor - instructor

IUS

- electric drive system

K

1. Kompleks [Vo'orouzheniya] – weapons system
2. - non braking nose-wheel

K

(suffix) Kryl'yevoy - wing-mounted)

KADD

Klapan-avtomaht Dvoynovo Deystviya – dual-action automatic safety valve

KAS

Kasseta/Konteyner Avareevyno-Spasahtel'naya – rescue capsule

KAZ

Kompleksnyy Agrgaht Zaprahvki – self-contained refuelling pack

KD

Kassetnyy Derzhahtel' - cassette-type rack

KDS

- chaff and flare dispenser

KKO

Komplekt Kislorodnovo Oboroodovaniya – oxygen equipment set

KKR

Kombinirovanny Konteiner Razvedy – combined reconnaissance pod

KM

1. - oxygen mask
2.[katapool'tnoye] Kreslo Mikoyana – Mikoyan ejection seat

KP

Kislorodnyy Preebor – oxygen equipment

KPA

Kislorodnyy Preebor Aviatsionny – aircraft oxygen equipment

KPS

Kormovaya Pritsel'naya Stahntsiya – Starboard beam sighting station

KPZh

Kislorodnyy Preebor Zhidkosnyy – oxygen system

KS

[katapool'tnoye] Kreslo Sukhovo – Sukhoi [ejection] seat

KT

Koleso Tormoznoye - brake [equipped] wheel

LAS

Lodka AvareeynoSpasahtel'naya – inflatable rescue dinghy

LASM

Lodka AvareeynoSpasahtel'naya Modernizeervannaya – inflatable rescue dinghy modernised

LPG

- cargo winch

LPS

Levaya Pritsel'naya Stahntsiya – Port beam sighting station

MKS

Mnogokoolpol'naya [parashootnaya] Sistema – multi-canopy [parachute] system

MLAS-M

M Lodka AvareeynoSpasahtel'naya-M – M single man inflatable rescue dinghy-M

MLAS

- multiple ejector rack

MRK

Mekhanizm Razvorota Kolesa – [nosewheel] steering mechanism

MS

- cockpit voice recorder

MSK

Morskoy Spasahtel'nyy Kostyum – maritime rescue suit

MSRP

- flight data recorder

NAFA

Nochnoy AeroFotoApparaht - night reconnaissance cameras

NAZ

Nosimyy Avareeynyy Zapahs – survival kit

Nochnaya fotrazvedka

– Type N night reconnaissance pod

OPB

Opticheskiy Pritsel Bombardirovochnyy – optical bomb sight)

OS

- fire extinguisher bottle

OMP

OM Pritsel - Il-10m gunners gunsight

PAN

Pritsel AN - telescopic sight

PAU

Pulemet Aviatcionny Uchebny – aircraft gun camera

PDSB

Parashootnaya DSB- parachute droppable container

PDUR

Parashootnaya DUR - parachute droppable package

PGS

Parashootnaya Groozovaya Sistema – parachute cargo system

PM

1. Planeeruyushchaya Mishen – gliding target
2. Pikeeruyuschchaya Mishen – diving target

PMP

Pritsel MP - Il-10m pilots gunsight)

PO

Preobrazovahtel' Odnofahznyy – AC converters

PPD

- pitot boom

PSK

Pritsel PD - collimating sight)

PSN

Plot spasahtel'nyy Nadoovnoy – six man life raft

PSP

Pritsel Strelkovyy Periskopicheskiy – flexible periscopic sight

PT

1. Preobrazovahtel' Tryokhfahznyy – AC converters
2. Parashoot Tormoznoy – brake parachute

PTB

Podvesnoy Toplivnyy Bahk – metal/external drop tanks

PLGB

- compressed cardboard drop tanks

PVD

Preeyomnik Vozdooshnovo Davleniya – air pressure sensor

Rahdiotekhnicheskaya razvedka

– Type R Elint pod

RD

Regoolaytor Davleniye – pressure regulator

RTSh

Raspylitel Toornel'nyy Shirokozakhvahtnyy – wide-strip tunnel type spreader

S

1. - gun camera
2. - parachute

ShRAP

- ground power receptacle

SIO

Sistema Imitahtsii Otkahzov – malfunction simulation system

SK

- ejection seat

SKAT

Stahntsiya Kompleksnaya Aerogheofizicheskaya Tryokhmetodnaya – three method integrated airborne geophysical module

SKG

- liquid oxygen (LOX) converter

SMI

- anti collision beacon

SPM

- rotating anti-coll light

SSP

- fire warning system

STG

- starter-generator

TAFA

Topograficheskiy AeroFotoapparaht – topographic aircraft camera

TG

ToorboGenerahtor - turbo-generator

TS

- starter generator

TSM

Teleskopicheskiy Strelyayushchiy Mekhanizm – telescopic firing mechanism ejection gun

TNU

Toorbonasosnaya Oostanovka – [air] turbo hydraulic pump

TV Razvedka

Ttpe T TV reconnaissance pod

U (suffix)

1. Oonifi-tseerovannyy - universal)
2. Oochenik - trainee

UBSh

Oonifitseerovannyy Ballon Sharovoy – universal [fire extinguisher] spherical bottles

UKhO

Oonifitseerovannyy Khvostovoy Otsek – standardised tail compartment [for ECM])

UPAZ

Universalny Podvesnoy Agregat Zapravki – in-flight refuelling pod

VAP

Vylivnoy Aviatsionnyy Pribor – fire-fighting module

VK

Ventileeruyemyy Kostyum – ventilated suit

VKK

Vysotnyy Kompenseeruyuschchiy Kostyum - altitude compensation/pressure suit

VMSK

- heat insulated and waterproof maritime pressure/rescue suit

VP

Vintovoy Podyomnik - screw-jack

VPS

1. Verkhnaya Pritsel'naya Stahntsiya – dorsal sighting system
2. Vytyazhnaya Parashoonaya Sistema – parachute extraction system

VSS

Vysotnyy Spasahtel'nyy Skafandr – high altitude rescue suit

ZSh

Zashchitnyy Shlem - flying helmet
