= Glossary of Russian and USSR aviation acronyms: Aircraft designations =

This is a Glossary of acronyms used for aircraft designations in the Russian Federation and formerly the USSR. The Latin-alphabet names are phonetic representations of the Cyrillic originals, and variations are inevitable.

== Terms ==
2I-N1

2 Istrebitel – N1 – two-seat fighter with Napier engine see DI-1

2MG

2 Motor Gelikopter – twin-engined helicopter

AK

Artilleriskii Korrektirovshchik – artillery correction

AO

Aeroopylitel – air duster Po-2

AP

Aeropyl – air dust Po-2

ARK

ARKtichyeskii - arctic

ARK-Z

-

ASh

Arkadiy Shvetsov-led engine design bureau prefix, coming from the OKB-19 bureau

ASK

Amfibiya Severnogo Kraya – amphibian for northern territory

BB

Blizhnii Bombardirovshchik – short-range bomber

BDD

Bombardirovshchik D D - Bolkhovitnov

BDP

Boyevoi Desantnyi Planer – troops assault glider

BI

Blizhniy Istrebitel – short-range fighter

BMP

- towed mine glider

BOK

-

BOP

-

BPB

Blizhniy Pikiruyushchiy Bombardirovshchik – short-range dive bomber

BS

-

BSB

-

BskhS

-

BSh

Bronirovannyy Shturmovik – armoured ground attack aircraft

CCB

see TsKB

D

1. - two-seat fighter
2. Dalnost - distance/range

DB

1. Dal'niy Bombardirovshchik – long-range bomber
2. Dnevnoi Bombardirovshchik – day bomber

DB-A

Dauhl'niy Bombardirovshchik-A – long-range bomber, academy

DB-LK

Dauhl'niy Bombardirovshchik-LK -

DBSh

-

DD

suffix Dauhl'niy Deystviya - long-range

DDBSh

Dauhl'niy Dvuhkmestny Bronirovannyi Shturmovik - long-range two-seat close support aircraft

DDI

-

DG

-

DI

Dvukhmesnyy Istrebitel' - two-seat fighter

DIP

Dvukhmyestnyi Istrebitel Pushechny – two-seat cannon fighter

DIS

1. Dvukhmotortnyi Istrebitel Soprovozhdyenyia – twin-engined escort fighter
2. Dalnyi Istrebitel Soprovozhdyeniya – (ДИС, Дальний истребитель сопровождения – long-range escort fighter)

DIT

Dvukhmyestnyi Istrebitel T - two-seat fughter - 2-seat shturmovik version of I-152

DKL

Dvukhmotornyi Krayenoi Linyeinyi - regional airliner

DKPV

-

DP

Dal'niy Perekhvahtchik – long-range interceptor

DPT

- long-range glider torpedo

DR

Dvigatel' [izdeliye] R [Tu-4] – engine test-bed [product] R [Tu-4] Myasischev inhouse designation for engine test aircraft.

DSB

Dnevnoy Skorosnoy Bombardirovshchik - fast day bomber

DVB

Dalnyi Vysotnyi Bombardirovshchik – long-range high-altitude bomber

E

Eksperimentalnyi - experimental

EA

Eksperimentalnyi Apparat – experimental apparatus – usually prefixed by a number

ED

Eksperimental Dvigatyel – experimental engine

EG

Eksperimentalnyi Gelikopter – experimental helicopter

EI

Eksperimentalyni Istribetel – experimental fighter

EOI

Eksperimentalyni Odnomyestnyi Istribetel – experimental single-seat fighter

FI

Frontovoy Istrebitel – frontal fighter

FS

Foto Samolyet – Photographic aircraft

G

Gelikopter – helicopter

GASN

Gidro-Aeroplan Spetsialno Naznachyeniya – seaplane special destination

GLL

Giperzvukovya letayuschchaya Laboratoriya – hypersonic flying laboratory

GM

-

GST

Gidro Samolyet Transportnaya – hydro aircraft transport – pby-1 Catalina

I

1. Izdeliye - product or article
2. Istrebitel' – fighter

IB

-
Istrebitel-Bombardirovschik - fighter bomber / strike fighter

IDD

Istrebitel' Dahl'nevo Deystviya – long-range fighter

IgA

-

IKh

-

IL

Istrebitel' [s dvigatelem] Liberty [moschnost'yu] 400 [loshadinykh sil] - fighter with a 400hp Liberty engine Polikarpov IL-400

IOP

Istrebitel' odnomestny Pushechnyi – single-seat cannon fighter

IP

Istrebitel' Pushyechnii – fighter, cannon

IS

1. Istrebitel' Skladnoi – folding fighter
2. Istrebitel' Soprovozhdyeniya – escort fighter
3. Istrebitel' Sylvanskii – fighter Sylvanskii

ISh

Istrebitel' Shturmovik – fighter attack

IT

Istrebitel' Tyazhelyi – heavy fighter

ITP

Istrebitel' Tyazhelyi Pushechnyi – heavy fighter with cannon

IVS

Istrebitel' VyisokoSkorostnyi – high speed fighter

I-Z

Izdeliye Z - project Z

K

1. -
2. Koor'yerskiy - courier

KhB

Khimichyevskii Boyevik – chemical fighter

KOR

Korabelnii O Razvedchik – shipboard catapult reconnaissance

KPIR

-

KR

1. Korabelniy Razvedchik – (корабельный разведчик - Shipboard Reconnaissance)
2. Katapul'tiruyemoye Kreslo [izdeliye] R [Tu-4] – ejection seat test-bed [product] R [Tu-4] Myasischev inhouse designation for ejection seat test aircraft.
3. Kreiser Razvyedchik - cruiser reconnaissance)

KSM

- Avietka non OKB designed light aircraft

KT

Kr'lya Tank – flying tank

LAKM

-

LAL

Летающая Атомная Лаборатория - letayuschchaya ahtomnaya laboratoriya - flying nuclear laboratory

LB

Legkii Bombardirovshchik – light bomber

LB-2LD

Legkii Bombardirovshchik-2LD – light bomber with 2 lorraine-Dietrich engines

LBS

Legkii Bombardirovshchik Sparka – light bomber, two seater

LBSh

Legkii Bronirovannyi Shturmovik – (ЛБШ, Легкий бронированный штурмовик – light armored attack aircraft)

LEM

Lev Pavlovich Malinovski- 1930s director of NTU-GVF

LIG

Leningradskii Institoot Grazdahnskovo Vozdooshnovo Flota- Leningrad Institute civil air fleet

LK

1. Legkii Kreiser – light cruiser
2. Leningradskii Kombinat – Leningrad combine

LKhS

- light utility transport 1994

LL

Letayuschchaya Laboratoriya - flying laboratory

LM

-

LNB

-

LR

Legkii Razvedchik – (ЛР, Легкий разведчик – light reconnaissance)

LS

Laminarnyi Sloi – laminar layer

LSh

Lyegkii Shturmovik – (ЛШ, Легкий штурмовик – light attack)

LT

Letayushchiy Tank – flying tank

LTDD

-long-range flying torpedo

M

Mishen – [radio-controlled] target radio-controlled versions of production aircraft had the OKB designation replaced with M, thus the RC target Il-28 became the M-28

MA

Mestnaya Amfibiya – regional amphibian

MAK

-

MB

-

MBR

Morskoi Blizhnii Razvedchik – marine short-range reconnaissance

MDR

Morskoi Dalnii Razvedchik – marine long-range reconnaissance

MDRT

Morskoi Dalnii Razvedchik Torpedonosyets – (МДРТ, Морской дальний разведчик-торпедоносец – long-range sea recon/torpedo bomber)

MER

-

MG

-

MGS

Mnogotselevoy Gruzovoy Samolet - multi-role cargo aircraft

MI

-

MIIT

-

MK

Morskoi Kreiser – sea cruiser

MM

Morskoi Minonosyets – marine mine carrier

MMN

-

MMSh

Malya Mod Shturmovik – experimental engine attacker

MP

1. Motor Planer – motor glider
2. Morskoi Passazhirskii – naval passenger transport
3. Morskoi Podvesnoi – marine suspended

MPI

1. Mnogomestnyi Pushyechnyi Istrebitel – (МПИ, Многоместный пушечный истребитель – multi-seat cannon fighter)
2. Morskoi Poplavkovyi Istrebitel – sea floatplane fighter

MR

Morskoi Razvedchik – naval reconnaissance

MRL

Morskoi Razvedchik Liberty – naval reconnaissance, Liberty engine

MS

Morskoi Samolyet – naval aircraft

MSh

-

MT

Morskoi Torpedonosyets – naval torpedo carrier

MTB

Morskoi Torpedonosyets-Bombardirovshchik – naval torpedo carrier-bomber

MTBT

Morskoi тяжелый Torpedonosyets-Bombardirovshchik – (МТБТ, Морской тяжелый бомбардировщик-торпедоносец – Heavy sea bomber/torpedo bomber)

MU

Morskoi Uchyebnii – naval trainer

MUR

Morskoi Uchyebnii Rhone – naval trainer, Rhone engine

N

-

NAK

Nochno-artillerisykyi Korrektirovshchik – night artillery observer

NB

Nochnoi Bombardirovshchik – night bomber

NBB

Nochnoy Blizhniy Bombardirovshchik – short-range night bomber

NK

-

OBSh

Odnomestnyi Bronirovanny Shturmovik (ОБШ, Одноместный бронированный штурмовик – single-seat armored attack aircraft)

ODB

-

ODBSh

Odnomestnyi Dvukhmotorny Bronirovanny Shturmovik – single-seat twin-engined armoured attack aircraft

OKB

-

OKO

-

OPB

Odnomestnyi Pikiryushchyi Bombardirovshchik - (ОПБ, Одноместный пикирующий бомбардировщик – single-seat dive bomber)

OPO

-

OSGA

- deck based aircraft

OSh

Odnomotornyi Shturmovik – single-engined attack

OSO

-

P

1. Perekhodnyi Pyervyi - intermediate
2. Passazheerskiy – passenger

P-Z

-

PB

1. Planer Bombardirovshchik – glider bomber
2. Pikiriyushchii Bombardirovshchik – dive bomber

PBSh

Pushechnyy Bronirovannyi Shturmovik (ПБШ, Пикирующий бронированный штурмовик – cannon-armed armoured assault aircraft)

PD

Perekhvatchik [s ToorboKompressorom] Dollezhalya – interceptor with a dollezhal' designed supercharger

PI

Pushechnii Istrebitel – cannon fighter

PL

Passazhirskii Leningrad – passenger transport Leningrad

PM

Passazhirskii Maybach – passenger transport Maybach engine

PR

-

PS

1. Passazheerskiy Samolyot – airliner / passenger aircraft
2. Proxrachnyy Samolyot – transparent aircraft

PSN

Planer Spetsial'no Naznachenaya – glider for special purposes

PT

-

PVRD

-

R

1. Razvedchik – reconnaissance
2. Reaktivnii - jet

RB

Razvedchik-Bombardirovshchik – reconnaissance-bomber

RD

Rekord Dalnosti – long distance record aircraft

RDD

Rekord Dalnost Diesel'nyi – diesel-engined long-range record aircraft

RD-VV

-

RF

Rot front – Red Front

RG

-

RGP

-

RK

1. Razreznoye Krylo – slotted wing
2. Razdvizhnoye Krylo – extending wing

RK-I '

Razdvizhnoye Krylo - Istrebitel – extending wing fighter

RM

-

RMK

-

ROM

Razvedchik Otkrytogo Morya – reconnaissance open sea

RP

1. -
2.Raketnyy Plahner – rocket-powered glider

RShR

-

RSR

-

RV

Rekord Vysoty – record height

RVZ

-

R-Z

-

S

1. Skorostnoi - speedy
2. Sparka – twin / coupled
3. Samolet - aircraft
4. Strelovidnoye [krylo] – swept wings
5. Sapfir - Fitted with Sapfir-21/RP-22 fire-control radar

SB

Russian: Скоростной бомбардировщик - Skorostnoi Bombardirovschik - high speed bomber,

SBB

-

SB-RK

-

SDB

1. Skorostnyi Dnyevnoi Bombardirovshchik – high-speed day bomber
2. Strategicheskiy Dal'niy Bombardirovshchik – strategic long-range bomber

SE

-

SEN

Samolyot Yefremova i Nadiradze – Yefremova and Nadiradze's aircraft UT-2N

SG

Samolet Gonochnii - Racing Aeroplane

Sh

Shturmovik – attack

ShB

1. Shturmovik Bombardirovshchik – ShB (ШБ, Штурмовик-бомбардировщик – attack/bomber)
2. Shturmovik Brovirovanny – armoured attack aircraft

ShBM

-

ShM

-

Sh-MAI

-

ShON

Shturmovik Osobogo Naznachyeniya – (ШОН, Штурмовик особого назначения – special purpose attack aircraft)

ShR

Shassi [izdeliye] R – undercarriage [product] R [Tu-4] Myasischev inhouse designation for bicycle u/c test aircraft.

ShS

Shtabnoi Samolet – staff aeroplane

SI

-

SK

Skorostnii Krylo – high-speed wing

SKB

- Avietka non OKB designed light aircraft

SKF

Sanitarnyi Kabina Filatov – ambulance cabin

SKh

Syel'skolkhozyaistyennyi - agricultural

SKIP

Samoletnyy Komandno-Izmeritel'nyy Punkt – airborne measuring and control point Beriev Samolyot 976

SL

-

SM

-

SON

Samolet Osobogo Naznachyeniya – aircraft special/personal assignment

SP

1. Spetzprimeneniya or Spetsialno Primeneniya – special purposes
2. Stratosfernyi Plane – stratospheric glider

SPB

Skorostnoi Pikiruyushchnyi Bombardirovshchik – (СПБ, Скоростной пикирующий бомбардировщик – high-speed dive bomber)

SPB/D

Skorostnoi Pikiruyushchnyi Bombardirovshchik / D – fast dive bomber / D

SPBP

Skorostnoi Pikiruyushchnyi BombardirovshchikPoplavkii – fast dive bomberfloat

SPBBSB

Skorostnoi Pikiruyushchnyi BombardirovshchikBSB – fast dive bomber -

SPD

Samolet Passazheerskiy Dal'niy - long-range passenger aircraft???? - (Ilyushin Il-18)

SPL

1. Svyazno Passazhirskii L – liaison passenger
2. Samolyet dlya Podvodnikh Lodok – aeroplane for submarine boats

SPS

Skorostnoi Passazhirskii Samolet – high-speed passenger aircraft

SR

skorstnoi Razvedchik – (СР, Скоростной разведчик – high-speed reconnaissance)

SRB

Skorostnoi Razvedchik Bombardirovshchik – high-speed reconnaissance-bomber

SS

Stratosfernii Samolyet – stratospheric aircraft

SSS

Skoropodyemnyi Skorotrelnyi – speedster, high-speed lift, fast-shooter

STI

-

SUVP

Samolyet UrkVozdukhPut – aircraft Ukrainian civil aviation authority

SVB

Samolet Vozdushnogo Boya – aircraft for air combat

T

1. Torpedonosyets – torpedo carrier
2. Treugol'noye(треугольный) [krylo] - triangular wing

TA

Transportnaya Amfibiya – transport amphibian

TAF

Transportnaya Amfibiya Fotografichyeskii – transport amphibian, photographic

TB

Tyazholyy Bombardirovshchik – heavy bomber

TI

Treneirovochni Istrebitel (ТИ, Тренировочный истребитель – trainer fighter)

TIS

Tyazhelyi Istrebitel Soprovozhdeniya – heavy escort fighter

TISMA

Tyazhelyi Istrebitel Soprovozhdeniya Mnogotsyelevoi -A – heavy escort fighter, multirole A

TK

Tjazholij Krejser - heavy cruiser

TOM

Torpedonosyets Otkrytogo Morya – (Торпедоносец открытого моря – Torpedo bomber for open seas)

TPK

- thick wing section

TRD

-

TS

Transportnyi Samolet – transport aircraft

TSh

Tyazheli Shturmovik – heavy attacker

TShB

-

TSK

- Avietka non OKB designed light aircraft - Pissarenko

U

uchebnyy - trainer

ULK

Universal'noye letayushchyeye Krylo – universal flying wing Grokhovskii G-37

UPB

Uchyebno-erekhodnoi Bombardirovshchik – training transitional bomber

UPO

-

UPS

Upravleniye Pogranichnym Sloyem – boundary layer control

UR

[sistema] oopravleniya [izdeliye] R – control [system] [product] R[Tu-4] Myasischev inhouse designation forpowered flying control system test aircraft.

USB

-

UT

Uchebno Trenirovochnyy - trainer

UTB

Uchebno Trenirovochnyy Bombardirovshchik – bomber trainer

UTI

Uchebno-trenirovochnyy Istrebitel' - fighter trainer

UTPB

Uchebno-trenirovochnyy Pikeeruyushchiy Bombardirovshchik – dive bomber trainer

VAT

- Avietka non OKB designed light aircraft

VB

-

VEK

-

VI

Vysotnyi Istrebitel – high altitude fighter

VIGR

-

VIT

Vozdushnyi Istrebitel Tankov – aerial tank fighter

VM

-

VM-T

Vladimir Myasischev-Transportnaya - Vladimir Myasischev - Transport

VNP

Vozdushnii Nabludatyelnii Punkt - aerial observation point

VO

-

VOP

-

VP

Vysotnyi Perekhvatchik – high altitude interceptor

VS

Vystavlyaet Samolyet – demonstration aircraft

VSI

VysokoSkorostnyi Istrebitel – high speed fighter

VT

-

VVA

-

Ye

Yedinitsa - one-off / single unit

Z

Zveno-link/flight

ZIG

-

== OKB / Constructor Prefixes ==
ACh

Charomskii engines

AIR

Yakovlev in-house designations

An

Antonov

Ar

Arkhangyelskii

Be

Beriev

BI

Beresnyak - Isayev

-

Chelomey

Chye

Chyetverikov

DG

Grigorovich in-house designations

Gu

Gudkov

Il

Ilyushin

KTs

Koleznikov-Tsybin

La

Lavochkin

LaGG

Lavochkin-Gorbunov-Gudkov

Li

Lisunov

MiG

Mikoyan i Guryevich

Mi

Mil

Mya

Myasischev

NK

Kuznetsov engines

NV

Nikitin in-house designations

Pe

Petlyakov

Po

Polikarpov

RAF

Rafaelyants in-house designations

Sh

Shavrov

Shchye

Shchyerbakov

Su

Sukhoi

Ts

Tsybin

Tu

Tupolev

Ya

Yakovlev in-house designations

Yak

Yakovlev

Yer

Yermolayev

== Designation suffixes & prefixes ==
A

1. (suffix) Ahtomnyy – atomic, i.e. nuclear capable
2. (suffix) - assault

AK

1. (suffix) Artilleriskii Korrektirovshchik – artillery correction
2. (suffix) A [dlya podgotovki] Kosmonahvtov – A for cosmonaut training

AKS

(suffix) Apparatoora Kosmicheskoy Svyazi – space communications equipment

ALK

(suffix) Avtomatizeerovannaya [sistema] Lyotnovo Kontrolya – automatic flight check system

AS

(suffix) AS – Slovak upgrade MiG-29AS

AT

(suffix) A Trahnsportnyy – A transport Il-18

AT-RD

(suffix) A Trahnsportnyy Reaktivnyye Dvigateli – A transport Jet engine

AT-U

(suffix) A Trahnsportnyy Ooskoriteli - A transport boosters

B

1. (suffix) Bombardirovshchik – bomber
2. (suffix) Biplahn - biplane
3. (suffix) B – second version MiG-31B

BI

(suffix) -

BK

(suffix) - MiG-23

BM

1. (suffix) B Modernizeerovannyy – B modernised MiG-31
2. (suffix) Beloroosskaya Modernizahtsiya – Belorussian upgrade MiG-29BM
3. (suffix) Booksirovshchik Misheney – target tug

BN

(suffix) -

BS

(suffix) B Stroyevaya [modernizahtsiya] – B in-service up-grade

BT

1. (suffix) BuksirTralshchik – towing minesweeper
2. (suffix) B Trahnsportnyy – B transport Il-18

B/R

(suffix) Bombardirovshchik-Razvedchik – bomber / reconnaissance

D

1. (suffix) Dahl'nomer - rangefinder
2. (suffix) - MiG-27
3. (suffix) - MiG-31D ASAT launcher
4. (suffix) Derevyannyy - wooden
5. (suffix) Dahl'niy - long-range
6. (suffix) Dorabotannya - revised
7. (suffix) Dvookhmesnyy - two-seat

DB

(suffix) Dahl'niy Bombardirovshchik - long-range bomber

DI

(suffix) Dahl'niy Istrebitel - long-range

DM

(suffix) Dopolnitel'nyye Motor – supplementary engine

DORR

(suffix) [Samolyto] Dahl'niy Okeahnskiy Razvedchik Ryby – long-range ocean fishery reconnaissance aircraft

DP

(suffix) Dvukmestnyi Polutoplan – two-seat sesquiplane

DSR

(suffix) Dahl'niy Strategicheskiy Razvedchik – long-range strategic reconnaissance aircraft

DTS

(suffix) Desahntno-Trahnsportnyy i Sanitarnyy – assault transport/ambulance

DU

(suffix) Dvoinyi Upravlenii – war control

DV

(suffix) - Pe-2DV

DZ

(suffix) DoZaprahvka – in-flight refuelling

E

1. (suffix) Ekranoplan – wing in ground effect
2. (suffix) Eksportnyy - export
3. (suffix) Eksperimentahl'nyy - experimental

F

1. (suffix) Forseerovannyy - uprated
2. (suffix) Fonar – canopy
3. (suffix) Fotograficheskiy – photo
4. (suffix) Fotorazvedchik - Photo-reconnaissance
5 (suffix) Forsazh - Afterburner

FE

(suffix) Frontovoy Eksportnyy – frontal/tactical export MiG-31

FG

(suffix) FotokartGraficheskiy – photo survey / mapping

FK

(suffix) FotoKartgraficheskiy – photo mapping

FKM

(suffix) FotoKartgraficheskiy Modernizeerovannyy – photo mapping, modified

FKP

(suffix) FotoKartgraficheskiy Modernizeerovannyy Passazheerskiy – photo mapping, passenger

FL

(suffix) -

FN

(suffix) -

FT

(suffix) Frontovoye Trebovaniye – front-line request

FZ

(suffix) Frontovoye Zadaniye –

GGO

(suffix) Glavnaya Gheofizicheskaya Observatoriya – geophysical observatory

G

1. (suffix) Gak – hook arrestor hook equipped
2. (suffix) G - Germany MiG-29G German upgraded
3. (suffix) Ghidrosamolyot - floatplane
4. (suffix) Groozovoy – cargo

GK

1. (suffix) Gruzovymi Kassetami – underwing cargo container
2. (suffix) Germetichyeskoi Kabine – hermetic pressure cabin

Gr

(suffix) Groozovoy – cargo

GrM

(suffix) Groozovoy, Modernizeerovannyy – cargo, modified

GN

(suffix) Golos Nyeba – voice from the sky

GT

(suffix) GT – Germany upgraded trainer MiG-29GT German upgraded

I

1. (suffix) Indeeskiy - Indian
2. (suffix) Issledovatel'skiy – research
3. (suffix) Istrebitel – fighter
4. (suffix) Izrail'skoye [obroodovaniye] – Israeli [equipment]

IB

(suffix) Istrebitel Bombardirovshchik – fighter bomber

IS

(suffix) Istrebitel soprovozhdeniya – escort fighter

ISh

(suffix) Istrebitel' Shtoormovik – attack fighter

K

1. (suffix) - MiG-27
2. (suffix) Kabina – cabin
3. (suffix) Kommerchesky – commercial for export
4. (suffix) Kompleks [vo'oruzheniya – weapons [system]
5. (suffix) Konverteeruyennyy - convertible
6. (suffix) Korabelnyi – ship based
7. (suffix) Korotkonogii – short legged
8. (suffix) Korrektovovshchik – correction
9. (suffix) [dlya podgotovki] Kosmonahvtov – for cosmonaut training

KABB

(suffix) Kombineerovnannaya Artillerisko Bombardirovochnaya Batareya Mozharovskovo i Venevidova – combined gun/bomb battery spotter designed by Mozharovskiy and Venevidova

Kh

(suffix) Kholod - cold cryogenic fuel testbed

KR

1. (suffix) - MiG-27KR
2. (suffix) KorrektiRovschchik – artillery spotter

KU

(suffix) Korabel'nyy Oochebnyy – shipboard trainer

KUB

(suffix) Korabel'nyy Oochebno-Boyevoy – shipboard combat trainer MiG-29KUB

KVP

(suffix) Korotkiy Vzlyot Posahdka – short landing/STOL

L

1. (suffix) Laborotoriya – laboratory
2. (suffix) Lesozashchita – forestry protection
3. (suffix) Limuzin – cabin transport
4. (suffix) Lyuks – de Luxe
5. (suffix) Lokator – Radar

LIK

(suffix) Lytno-Ispytatel'nyy Kompleks – flight test complex

LL

(suffix) Letyushchaya Laborotoriya – flying laboratory

LL-PLO

(suffix) Letyushchaya Laborotoriya - Protivolodochnoy Obrony – flying laboratory – [ASW] anti submarine warfare

LNB

(suffix) Lyegkii Nochnoi Bomardirovshchik – light night bomber

LP

(suffix) LesopPozharnyy - forest patrol

LPL

(suffix) Lyezhachi Polozheni Lyetchik – prone position pilot

LR

(suffix) Ledovyy Razvedchik – ice reconnaissance

LS

(suffix)0 Limuzin Svyarznoi -

LSh

1. (suffix) Lyzhnoye Shassee – ski undercarriage

2. (suffix) Lyokhkiy Shtoormovik – light attack aircraft

MF

(suffix) -

M

1. (suffix) Manevreeruyushchaya - manoeuvering
2. (suffix) Mishen - target
3. (prefix) Mishen – [radio-controlled] target
4. (suffix) Morskoi - marine
5. (suffix) Modernizeerovannyy – up-dated/modernised
6. (suffix) Modifikatsirovanni - modified
7. (suffix) Modifitseerovannyy – modified
8. (suffix) Morskoi - marine
9. (suffix) - meteorological

MD

1. (suffix) Modifitseerovannyy, Dorabotannyy - modified, upgraded
2. (suffix) Modifitseerovannyy, Dahl'niy - modified, long-range

ME

(suffix) Modernizeerovannyy Eksportnyy – up-dated/modernised export MiG-29ME

MF

(suffix) Modifikahtsya dlya Filipin – Philippines export version MiG-29MF

MGA

(suffix) Ministerstvo Grazhdahnskoy Aviahtsii – ministry of civil aviation Il-76MGA

MK

1. (suffix) Modifitseerovannyy Konverteeruyemyy – modified, convertible Il-76MK
2. (suffix) Mekhanizeerovannoye Krylo – mechanised wings fitted with high lift devices

ML

(suffix) Modifitseerovannyy, Lyohkiy - modified lightweight

MLA

(suffix) Modifitseerovannyy, Lyohkiy, Ametist - modified lightweight fitted with Amethyst RADAR

MLD

(suffix) Modifitseerovannyy, Lyohkiy, Dorabotannyy - modified lightweight, upgraded

MLDG

(suffix) Modifitseerovannyy, Lyohkiy, Dorabotannyy, Gardeniya - modified lightweight, upgraded, [fitted with] Gardenia radar

MLG

(suffix) Modifitseerovannyy, Lyohkiy, Gardeniya - modified lightweight, [fitted with] Gardenia radar

MLS

(suffix) Modifitseerovannyy, Lyohkiy, S - modified lightweight, S

MM

(suffix) Mahlovysotnaya Mishen - low-altitude target

MMSh

(suffix) Malya Mod Shturmovik – experimental engine attacker

MP

(suffix) - electronic countermeasures

MR

(suffix) MeteoRazvedchik – weather reconnaissance

MS

(suffix) -

MSh

(suffix) MiShen - target

MT

(suffix) -

MV

(suffix) Modifitseerovannyy Vo'oruzhonnyy – modified armed

MZ

(suffix) Modernizeerovannyy/Zaprahvshchik – modernised/tanker

N

1. (suffix) Nositel' [yadernovo oroozhiya] – [nuclear weapons] carrier
2. (suffix) Nositel' [spetsboyepripasa] – [special weapons] carrier
3. (suffix) N – [Malaysian export] MiG-29
4. (suffix) Nit – [fitted with] Nit'-S1[SLAR]

NAK

(suffix) NochnoArtilleriskyi Korrektovovshchik – night artillery correction

NUB

(suffix) N Uchebno-Boevoy –[Malaysian export] combat trainer MiG-29

OB

(suffix) Odnomestnyi Biplan – single-seat biplane

OES

(suffix) Opytnny Experimental'nyy Samolyot – prototype experimental aircraft

ON

1. (suffix) Odnomestnyi Nizkoplan – single-seat low-wing monoplane
2. (suffix) Osobogo Naznachyeniya – special/personal assignment

OP

(suffix) OPerahtorskiy [samolyot] – [camera] operators [aircraft]

ORR

(suffix) Okeahnskiy Razvedchik Ryby – ocean / fishery reconnaissance aircraft

OS

(suffix) Opyshyennyi Stabilizator – trimmed stabiliser

OVT

(suffix) Otklonyayemyy Vektor Tyaghi – thrust vector control

P

1. (suffix) Passazheerskiy – passenger
2. (suffix) Perkhvatchik' – interceptor
3. (suffix) Pushechnyy – cannon armed
4. (suffix) Pochtovyy [samolyot] – mailplane
5. (suffix) Poplavkii – floats
6. (suffix) Poolsa – stripe
7. (suffix) Pozharnyy – forestry protection
8. (suffix) Pererabotannyy - re-worked

PA

(suffix) Perkhvatchik' Aerostahtov – balloon interceptor

PB

(suffix) Planer Bombardirovshchik – glider bomber

PD

1. (suffix) Perkhvatchik' Dorabotanny – interceptor modified
2. (suffix) Podyomnyye Dvigateli – lift engines

PDS

(suffix) Perkhvatchik' Dorabotanny v Stroyoo – interceptor modified field-modified

PDZ

(suffix) Perkhvatchik' Dorabotanny Zaprahvka – interceptor modified re-fuelling

PF

(suffix) - photo mapping

PFS

(suffix) -

PFU

(suffix) -

PFV

(suffix) -

PL

(suffix) ProtivoLodochnyy - Anti-submarine

PLO

(suffix) Protivolodochnoy Obrony – [ASW] anti submarine warfare

PM

1. (suffix) Pilotazhnyy Modifitseerovannyy – aerobatic modified
2. (suffix) Perekhvatchik' Modernizeerovannyy – interceptor modified

PMU

(suffix) Perekhvatchik' Modernizeerovannyy U – interceptor modified boosted

Polyarnyi

(suffix) polar

PP

1. (suffix) Postanovshchik Pomekh – ECM aircraft
2. (suffix) Protivopozharnyy – fire fighting

PPA

(suffix) Patanovchik Pamech Aktivni'i – comint and jamming platform

PRT

Poikovo-spasahtel'nyy Reaktivnyy [Ooskoritel'] Trahnsportnyy – SAR boosted transport

PS

1. (suffix) Pilotazhnyy Spetsiahl'nyy – aerobatic special
2. (suffix) Pilotazhnyy Samolyot – aerobatic aircraft
3. (suffix) Poiskovo-Spahtel'nyy – search and rescue

PT

(suffix) Perkhvatchik' Teplvaya golovka samonavedeniya – interceptor with IR seeker head

PVO

(suffix) Protivovozdushnaya Oborona – air defence

PVRD

(suffix) Pryamototchnyye Vozdooshno Reaktivnyye Dvigatel - ramjets

PU

(suffix) Perekhvatchik' Oochebnyy – interceptor trainer

PU-SOTN

(suffix) Perekhvatchik' Oochebnyy – Samolyot Optiko-Televizionnovo Nablyudeniya – interceptor trainer – optical/TV surveillance aircraft

PuVRD

(suffix) -

R

1. (suffix) - Mi-10
2. (suffix) Razvedchik – reconnaissance
3. (suffix) Reaktivnyy – jet propelled reaction engines
4. (suffix) Rekordnyi - record

RB

(suffix) Razvedchik Bombardirovshchik – reconnaissance bomber

RBK

RBF (suffix) Razvedchik Bombardirovshchik [izdeliye 02]F – reconnaissance/bomber/electronic reconnaissance [fitted with 'Shar' sigint package in izdeliye02]F

(suffix) Razvedchik Bombardirovshchik s apparatooroy Koob – reconnaissance/bomber/electronic reconnaissance fitted with 'Koob' sigint package

RBN

(suffix) Razvedchik Bombardirovshchik Nochnoy – night reconnaissance/bomber/electronic reconnaissance

RBS

(suffix) Razvedchik Bombardirovshchik s apparatooroy Sablya – reconnaissance/bomber/electronic reconnaissance fitted with 'Sablya' SLAR

RBSh

(suffix) Razvedchik Bombardirovshchik s apparatooroy Shompol – reconnaissance/bomber/electronic reconnaissance fitted with 'Shompol' sigint package

RBT

(suffix) Razvedchik Bombardirovshchik s apparatooroy Tangazh – reconnaissance/bomber/electronic reconnaissance fitted with 'Tangazh' sigint package

RBV

(suffix) Razvedchik Bombardirovshchik s apparatooroy Virazh – reconnaissance/bomber/electronic reconnaissance fitted with 'Virazh' sigint package

RBVDZ

(suffix) Razvedchik Bombardirovshchik s apparatooroy Virazh Dorabotannyy dlya Zapravki – reconnaissance/bomber/electronic reconnaissance fitted with 'Virazh' sigint package and in flight refuelling

RBShDZ

(suffix) Razvedchik Bombardirovshchik s apparatooroy Shompol Dorabotannyy dlya Zapravki – reconnaissance/bomber/electronic reconnaissance fitted with 'Shompol' sigint packageand in flight refuelling

RR

(suffix) Razvedchik Ryby – fisheries reconnaissance

RD

(suffix) Reaktivnyy Dvigatel – jet propelled engine

REB

(suffix) [Samolyot] RahdioElektronnoy Bor'byy – electronic countermeasures aircraft

REO

(suffix) [Samolyot] RahdioElektronnoye Oboroodovaniye – electronic equipment test-bed [aircraft]

REP

(suffix) RahdioElektronnoye Protivodeystviye - ECM Electronic Counter-Measures [aircraft]

RLD

(suffix) Rahdio Lokatsionnyy Dozor – radar picket

RM

(suffix) [samolyot] Razvedchik, Modifitseerovannyy – modified reconnaissance aircraft

RP

(suffix) - fisheries reconnaissance

RR

(suffix) [samolyot] Radiotsionnyy Razvedchik – radiation intelligence [aircraft]

RRV

(suffix) Radiotsionnyy Razvedchik Vysotnyy – radiation intelligence [aircraft], high altitude

RT

1. (suffix) Reaktivnyy [ooskoritel'] Trahnsportnyy - jet booster transport
2. (suffix) ReTranslyator – relay installation

RTL

(suffix) ReTranslyator Laborotoriya – relay installation laboratory

RTR

(suffix) [Samolyot] RahdioTekhnicheskoy Razvedki – electronic reconnaissance aircraft

RU

(suffix) Razvedchik Oochebnyy – reconnaissance aircraft, trainer

RV

1. (suffix) Razvedchik Vysotnyy – reconnaissance aircraft, high altitude
2. (suffix) Reaktivnyy [Ooskoritel'] V – boosted V An-24RV

S

1. (suffix) - MiG-29S
2. (suffix) Salon – vip aircraft
3. (suffix) Sanitarnyy - medical
4. (suffix) Sapfeer – [fitted with] Sapfeer [radar]
5. (suffix) Sereeynyy / Serinyi -series / production
6. (suffix) Stabilizator - stabiliser
7. (suffix) Strelovidnoye [krylo] – swept wings

SAU

(suffix) Sistema Avtomaticheskovo Oopravleniya – [fitted with] automatic control system

S

(suffix) Sduv Pogranichnovo Sloya – Boundary layer blowing

SD

(suffix) S Dozaprahvka – S in-flight refuelling MiG-29SD

SDB

(suffix) Skorostnyi Dnyevnoi Bombardirovshchik – high-speed day bomber

SDK

(suffix) Samolyot-Dooblyor Komety – Kometa missilemanned analogue MiG-17SDK

SE

(suffix) S Eksportnyy – S export MiG-29SE

Sh

(suffix) Shturmovik - attack

ShS

(suffix) Shatbnoi Samolyet – staff aeroplane

ShT

(suffix) Shtabnoy Trahnsportnyy – Staff/HQ transport

SIP

(suffix) Samolyotnyy Izmeritel'nyy Poonkt – airborne measuring station

SK

1. (suffix) Spetsiahl'nyy Komahndnyy [samolyot] – special command [aircraft]
2. (suffix) Samolyotnyy Komahndno-[izmeritel'nyy poonkt] – airborne [measuring and] control [point] ULL-76 / ULL-76-02

SKh

(suffix) Sel'skoKhozyaistvennyy - agricultural sprayer/duster

SL

(prefix) Samolyot-Laboratoriya – laboratory aircraft Leninets re-designated their research aircraft with the prefix SL, thus the Il-18SL was probably more correctly designated the SL-18A

SM

(suffix) S Modernizeerovannyy - S modernised MiG-29SM

SMT

(suffix) S Modernizeerovannyy Toplivo – up-dated/modernised, fuel Mig-29SMT

SMV

(suffix) - border surveillance Mi-8

SO

Salon Obslooga – VIP service personnel

SOLF

(suffix) Spetsializeerovannyy Oftal'mologicheskiy Letayushchiy Filiahl – specialised ophthalmic [surgery] flying branch office

SP

(suffix) SpetzPrimeneniya or Spetsialno Primeneniya – special purposes

(СР, Скоростной разведчик – high-speed reconnaissance)

SSS

(suffix) Skoropodyemnyi SkoroStrelnyi – speedster, high-speed lift, fast-shooter

stk

(suffix) [izdeliye S] trenirov-ochnoy Katapool'toy – training ejection system UTI-MiG-15stk

SU

(suffix) Spahrennoye Oopravleniye – dual controls

T

1. (suffix) Tankovyi – tank buster
2. (suffix) Tahksi - taxi
3. (suffix) Teplovaya [glovka Samonavedeniya] – Infra-Red seeker
4. (suffix) Toplivo - fuel
5. (suffix) Torpedonosyets – torpedo carrier
6. (suffix) Trahnsportnyy – transport
7. (suffix) Trenirovochnyy – proficiency trainer
8. (suffix) Tryokhkolyosnoye Shasee – tri-cycle undercarriage
9. (suffix) Tyazhelovo'oruzhonny – heavily armed
10. (suffix) Treugol'noye(треугольный) [krylo] - triangular wing

TB

1. (suffix) Trahnsportno-Booksirovshchik – transport / glider tug
2. (suffix) - Mil Mi-8TB

TBK

(suffix) - Mil Mi-8TBK

TD

(suffix) Trahnsportno-Desahntnyy – transport / assault aircraft

TG

1. (suffix) Trahnsportno-Groozovoy – transport / cargo
2. (suffix) - LPG powered Mi-8

TK

1. (suffix) – anti-tank
2. (suffix) - thin wing
3. (suffix) Trahnsportnyy, Konverteeruyemyy – convertible passenger/cargo
4. (suffix) ToorboKompressorom - turbo-charged

TKGK

(suffix) ToorboKompressorom Ghermeticheskoy Kabinoy - turbo-charged [engine], hermetically sealed cabin

TM

(suffix) Torpedonosets Modifitseerovannyy – modified torpedo bomber

TS

(suffix) Trahnsportno-Sanitarnyy – transport / medical

TP

1. (suffix) Torpedonosets Poplavkovyy – Torpedo carrier floatplane
2. (suffix) Trahnsportno-Paasazheerskiy – cargo / passenger

TV

(suffix) Trahnsportnyy V – transport V

U

1. (suffix) Uchebnyi (Учебный - "Trainer")
2. (suffix) Uloochshennyy – improved

UD

(suffix) Oosovershenstvovannyy, Dereviannyy - improved, wooden

UF

(suffix) Oochebnyy Fotosoprovozhdeniye – trainer-photographic support

UB

(suffix) Uchebno-Boevoy – combat trainer

UBT

(suffix) Uchebno-Boevoy Toplivo – combat trainer, fuel MiG-29UBT

UBM

(suffix) Uchebno-Boevoy Modernizeerovannyy – combat trainer, modernised MiG-29UBM

US

(suffix) oochebnyy Sdoov [Pogranichnovo Sloya] – trainer with BLC

USh

1. (suffix) Oochebno Shtoormanskiy [Samolyot] – navigator trainer aircraft
2. (suffix) U Shtoormanskiy [Samolyot] – U trainer aircraft I-153USh

ULL

(prefix) Ooniversahl'naya letyuschchaya Laboratoriya – universal flying laboratory

UM

1. (suffix) Oochebnyy, Modernizeerovannyy – upgraded trainer
2 (suffix) Uloochshennyy M – improved M new build Yak-9U's

US

(suffix) -

UT

(suffix) Uchyebno Trenirovochnyi – conversion/proficiency/educational training

UTG

(suffix) Uchyebno Trenirovochnyi Gak – educational training with arrestor hook

UTI

(suffix) oochebno Trenirovochnyy Istrebitel' - fighter trainer

UV

(suffix) Uloochshennyy Vyvoznoy – improved familiarisation training

UVP

(suffix) Ookorochennyy Vzlyot i Posahdka - STOL

V

1. (suffix) - floatplane An-2 floatplane
2. (suffix) - Il-18
3. (suffix) Vysotnyy – height/high-altitude
4. (suffix) Vyvoznoy – familiarisation training

V-TKGK

(suffix) Vysotnyi ToorboKompressorom Germetichyeskoi Kabine – high-altitude turbo-charged hermetic pressure cabin

VB

(suffix) Visotnyi Bombardirovshchik – high altitude bomber

VI

(suffix) Visotnyi Istrebitel – (ВИ, Высотный истребитель – high-altitude fighter)

VK

(suffix) Vozdooshno-Kosmicheskiy – air/space [satellite launcher]

VKP

(suffix) Vozdooshnyy Komahndnyy Poonkt – Airborne command post

VP

(suffix) -

VPU

(suffix) Vozdooshnyy Poonkt Oopravleniya – airborne command post

VRD

(suffix) Vozdooshno Reaktivnyye Dvigatel - ramjets

VRDK

(suffix) Vozdooshno-Reaktivnyy Dvigatel' Kompressornovo Tipa – compressor-type air-breathing engine

VS

(suffix) Voiskovoi Seriya – military series

VT

1. (suffix) V Trahnsportnyy – V transport Il-18
2. (suffix) Voyenno-Trahnsportnyy [samolyot] – military transport aircraft Il-114VT

VV (suffix) Vertikahl'nyy Vzlyot – vertical take-off

VZPU

(suffix) Vozduzhni'i Zapasdnoi Punkt Upravlenya – aerial emergency command post

ZA

(suffix) Zondirovshchik Atmosfery – atmosphere sampler

Zh

(suffix) Zhidkosnyy[reaktivnyy dvigatel] – liquid fuelled [rocket motor]

ZIG

(suffix) Zavod Imyennyi Goltsman – Works named for Goltsman
