= Glossary of Russian and USSR aviation acronyms: Avionics and instruments =

This is a glossary of acronyms and initials used for avionics and aircraft instruments in the Russian Federation and formerly the USSR. The Latin-alphabet names are phonetic representations of the Cyrillic originals, and variations are inevitable.

== Avionics and instruments ==
AB

- navigation display/drift sight

ABSU

- integrated automatic control system

AChKhO

- chronometer

AGD

- artificial horizons and situation display

AGI

Avia-gorizont Istrebitel'nyy – artificial horizon for fighter aircraft

AGK

- artificial horizon0

AIP

- optical bombsight

AIS

- astro-inertial navigation system

AP

1. - directional Gyro
2. - autopilots pre1960

APD

- secure digital data-links

APM

- magnetic anomaly detectors MAD

APP

- automatic control systems for dispensers ('chuff and fluff' - Chaff and Flare countermeasures)

APS

Avtomaht Pereklahdki Stabilizahtora – automatic stabiliser incidence adjuster

ARK

Automatcheskiy RadioKompass - automatic radio compass ADF

ARL

- analogue FM secure data-links and beacon rx

ARL-SM

- analogue FM secure data-links and beacon rx

ARU

Avtomat Regulirovaniya Usily – artificial feel device

ARZ

Avtomat Regulirovaniya Zagruzki - artificial feel system

ANP

Avtomaticheskiy Navigatsionnyy Pribor – automatic navigation device

APP

Avtomaht Passivnykh Pomekh – automatic passive ECM/IRCM device

ASP

1. Aviacionny Strelkovy Pritsel – aerial gun-sight
2. Avtomaticheskiy Strelkovyy Pritsel – computing gun-sight

ASTU

- airborne automatic thermo-anemometer

ASU

- GCI receivers

AU

Avtomaht Oosiliy – automatic artificial feel unit

AUASP

Avtomaht Ooglov Atahki, Snosa i Peregroozki – automatic AOA/sideslip/g limiter

AVR-M

- chronometer0

BARS

Bortovaya Avtomaticheskaya Registreeruyushchaya Sistema – on-board automatic recording system

BKO

- integrated defence electronics complex

BKP

Blok Krenovykh Popravok – bank compensation module

BMR

- weather research RADAR

BRS

- telemetry receiver

BTsK

Bortovoy Tsifrovoy Kompleks – on-board digital suite

BU

Blok Oopravleniya - control module

D

- Dutch roll damper

DA

- combined VSI & turn and bank indicator

DAK-DB

Distantsionnyy AstroKompass – DAB – remote celestial compass

DGMK

Distantsionnyy Gheeromagnitnyy Kompass – gyro-magnetic compass

DIK

- flux-gate compass

DISS

Doplerovskiy Izmeritel' Skorosti i Snosa - doppler speed/drift sensor system

DNM

- secure data link

DT

- pitch damper

EDGMK

Elektricheskiy Distantsionnyy Gheeromagnitnyy Kompass – electro-gyro-magnetic compass

ESUV

Elektronnaya Sistema Upravleniya Vozduhozabornika – inlet ramp control system

EUP

Elektrischeskiy Ooskazahtel' Povorota – electric turn and bank indicator

G

(suffix) Grazahnskiy - civil

GIK

GheeroIndooktsionnyy Kompass - earth inductor/gyro flux compass

GLONASS

GLObahl'naya NAvigatsionnaya Spootnikovaya Sistema – global navigation satellite system

GMK-TG

- compass system

GIK

- directional gyro

GPK

GheeroPoluKompas - gyro-compass

IA

- exhaust gas temperature indicator

IKVR

Izmeritel'nyy Kompleks Vysokovo Razresheniya – high resolution measurement system

IKVR

Izmeritel'nyy Kompleks Vysokovo Razresheniya – high resolution measurement system

ILS

- advanced HUD no relation to ILS

IRIS

Izmeritel'-Registrahtor Impool'snykh Signahlov – [electro-magnetic] pulse signal measurement and recording device

IS

- inertial navigation system

ITE

- tachometer

IVR

Indikahtor Vertikahl'nykh Rezheemov – vertical modes indicator

K

Kompleks [Vo'orouzheniya] – weapons system

KAP

Korrekteeruyemaya Avia P - autopilot roll only

KI

- compass

KN

Kompleks Navigahtsii/Navigatsionnyy – navigation system

KP

Kol'tsevoy Pritsel - ring sight

KPM

Kompleks Polunatoornovo Modeleerovaniya – testrig/combat simulator

KRU

Komanhdnoye Rahdio'upravleniye - radio command guidance system

KRU-UB

Komanhdnoye Rahdio'upravleniye Oopravlyayemoy Bomboy - radio command guidance system for UB guided bombs

KS

Koorsovaya Sistema – compass system

KSI

Koorsavaya Sistema Istrebiel'naya – course indicator system for fighters

KUS

Kombineerovanny oozkazahtel' Skorosti – airspeed indicator

MA

- Mach meter

MFBU

MnogoFoonktsionahl'nyy Blok Oopravleniya – multi-function missile control module

MRP

Markernyy RahdioPreeyomnik - marker beacon receiver

MS

NBA

Navigatsionnyy Bombardirovchnyy Avtomaht – automatic navigation/bomb release module

NI

Navigatsionnyy Indikahtor - ground position indicator

NK

Navigatsionnyy Kompleks – navigation suite

NKPB

Nochnoy Kollimahtonyy Pritsel Bombardirovochnyy – night capable collimator bombsight

NVU

Navigatsionnoye Vychislitel'noye Oostroystvo - navigation computer

OEPS

Optika-Elektronnoya Pritselnaya Sistema – electro-optical search and track system

OEPrNK

Optika-Elektronnoya Pritsel'no-navigatsionnyy Kompleks – electro-optical weapons aiming and navigation system

OLS-M

Optiko-Lokatsionnaya Stahntsiya – Modernizeerovannaya – combined IR/TV search and track/laser ranger unit

OP

Opticheskiy Pritsel - optical gunsight

OPB

Opticheskiy Pritsel bombardirovochnyy – optical synchronised bombsight

OSP

Oboroodovaniye Slepoy Posahdki - instrument/blind landing system

P

(suffix) Pomekhozashchishchonnost – ECM resistant

PARG

Poluaktivnaya Rahdiolokatsionnaya Golovka [samonavedeniya] – semi-active radar seeker head

PBK

Pritsel Dlya Bombometahniya s Kabreerovaniya – bomb sight for nbomb delivery in a climb [toss/loft bombing sight]

PDSP

Parashootno-desahntnaya Sistema Pelengahtsii – parachute dropping system receiver

PINO

Proyektsionnyy Indikahtor Navigatsionnoy Obstanovki – navigation head up display

PKI

Pritsel KI - collimator sight

PNS

Pritsel'no-navigatsionnaya Sistema - nav attack system

PP

Pritsel P – high altitude sight

PRGS

Poluaktivnaya Rahdiolokatsionnaya Golovka Samonavedeniya – semi-active radar seeker

PrNK

Pritsel'no-Navigatsionnyy Kompleks – nav/attack system

PRS

Pritsel Rahdiolokatsionnyy Strelkoyy - gunners RADAR sight

PS

Pritsel'naya stahntsiya – sighting station

PSBN

Pribor Slepovo Bomometahniya I Navigahtsii – search/bomb-aiming RADAR

PSP

Pritsel Strelkovyy Periskopicheskiy – flexible periscopic sight

PTN

Pritsel Torpednyy Nizko-vysotnyy – low altitude torpedo sight

PTU

- video recording system

PVU

Pritsel'no-Vychislitel'noye Oostroystvo – computing sight

R

- radio transmitter

RBP

Rahdiolokatsionnyy Bombardirovochnyy Pritsel – RADAR bomb sight

RGB

RahdioGhidroakoosticheskiy Booy – sonobuoy

RI

Rechevoy Informahtor – automatic voice annunciator

RIS

Rahdio'iskhatel Samolyotov – radio device for detecting aircraft early name for RADAR in USSR

RIU

Reghistreeruyushcheye Indikahtornoye oostroystvo – display and recording unit

RLPK

RahdioLokatsionnyy Pritsel'nyy Kompleks – radar targeting system

ROZ

Radiolokahtor Obzora Zemlee - weather/navigation radar

RP

Rahdiolokatsionnyy Pritsel – radio[RADAR] sight

RP-SA

Rahdiolokatsionnyy Pritsel - SA – radio[RADAR] sight

RP

– translusency recorder

RPK

RahdioPoluKompas - direction finder

RPKO

RahdioPoluKOmpas - direction finder

RPSN

Rahdiolohkatsionnyy Pribor Slepoy Navigahtsii – blind navigation radar device

RSB

Radio Stahntsiya Bombardirovochnaya – bomber aircraft radio station

RSBN

Radio Stahntsiya Blizhnei Navigatsii - short range radio navigation system SHORAN

RSI

Radio Stahntsiya Istrebitelnaya – fighter radio system

RSIU

Radio Stahntsiya Istrebitelnaya Ultrakorotkovolnovaya – fighter V/UHF radio system

RTO

- data-link system

RSU

Radio Stahntsiya Ultrakorotkovolnovaya – UHF radio system

RTS

RahdiotelemeTricheskaya Stahntsiya – radio telemetry station

RUP

Reshayushcheye Oostroystvo Posahdki – landing computer ILS

RUSP

RahdioUstroystvo Slepoy Posahdki – blind landing radio device ILS

RV

RahdioVysotomer – radio altimeter

RV-UM

RahdioVysotomer UM – radio altimeter UM

SAB

Sistema Avtomaticheskoy Balansirovki – automatic longitudinal trim system

SAMB

- airborne automatic weather research module

SARPP

Sistema Avtomaticheskoy Registratsii Poletnykh Parametrov/Parametrov Polyota – in-flight recorder

SAU

Sistema Avtomaticheskogo Upravleniya - autopilot

SBI

- phased array, pulse-doppler radar

SCh

- Svoy/Choozkoy - IFF IFF

SD

- distance measuring equipment

SDU

Sistema Distancionnogo Upravleniya – fly by wire control system

SGU

Samolyotnoye Gromkogovoryashcheye Oostroystvo – airborne loudspeaker system

ShKAI

Sheeroko'ugol'nyy Kollimahtornyy Aviatsionnyy Indikahtor – wide angle collimated display for aircraft wide angle HUD

SIV

Samolyotnyy Infrakrahsnyy Vizeer – aircraft mounted Infra-Red sight

SN

Sistema Navigahtsii - navigation system

SO

Samoletny Otvetchik – aircraft transponder

SOD

Stahntsiya Opredeleniya Dahl'nosti - radio rangefinder DME

SOI

Sistema otobrazheniya Informahtsii – data presentation system

SOM

Samolyotnyy Otvetchik Mezhdunarodnyy – aircraft mounted international transponder

SOUA

Sistema Organicheniya Oogla Atahki – angle of attack limiter system

SOS

Sistema Organichitel'nykh Signahlov – AOA limiter

SP

[sistema / apparatoora] Slepoy Posahdki - ILS

SPARU

Samolotnoye Preeyomnoye Avtomaticheskoye RahdioUstroystvo – airborne automatic radio receiver device [sono-buoy receiver]

SPGS

Samolyotnaya peregovornaya Gromkogovoryashchaya Sistema – intercom system

SPI

- LORAN

SPO

Sistema Preduprezhdeniya ob Obluchenii – irradiation warning system[RWR]

SPRS

- heading radar

SPS

Stahntsiya Pomekhovykh Signahlov – [lit. interference emitter] active jammer

SPU

Samolyotnoye Peregovornoye Oostroystvo - intercom

SRD

Samolyotnyy RahdioDahl'nomer – aircraft radio rangefinder[gun ranging radar]

SRO

Samolyotnyy Rahdiolokatsionnyy Otvetchik – airborne IFF transponder

SRP

Shchotno-reshayushchiy Pribor – counting and computing device

SRS

Stahntsiya Razvedki Svyazi – signals intelligence pack

SRZO

Sistema/Samolyotnyy Radio[lokatsionnyy] Zaproschik Otvetchik – IFF airborne / system

SSP

Sistema Signalizahtsii Pozhara – fire warning system

STU

- approach/landing system

SUIT

- fuel metering system

SUU

Sistema Oostoychivosti I Oopravlyayemosti - stability and control system

SUV

Sistema Oopravleniya Vo'oruzheniyem – weapons control system

SVB

- medium wave radio

SVS

Sistema Vozdushnyh Signahlov – air data computer

SYeV

Sistema Yedinovo Vremeni – time synchronisation system

TARK

Televizionnyy Aviatsionnyy Razvedyvatel'nyy Kompleks – TV reconnaissance system

TKS

TeleKodovaya Sistema – encrypted data-link system

TP

1. TeploPelengahtor – FLIR sensor
2. Televizionnyy Pritsel - television sight

TS

Tablo Signalizahtsii – warning/caution light panel

TSP

Televizionnyy Strelkovyy Ptritsel - television sighting system

TsGV

- Gyro-flux gate

TsP

- fire control RADAR

TsPNK

Tsifrovoy Pilatzhno-Navigatsionnyy Kompleks – digital flight avionics/navigation suite

TsSV

- central air data system

TsSVM

Tsifrovaya Vychislitel'naya Mashina – digital computer

RGB-N

Rahdio-Ghidroakoosticheskiy Booy N - sonobuoy

UISM

- combined ASI/machmeter

UNSM

- combined ASI/machmeter

UP

1. - nozzle position indicator
2. Ookazahtel' Povorota – turn indicator

UPS

Ookazahtel Polozheniya Stabilizahtora – tailplane incidence indicator

US

1. - radio receiver
2. Ookazahtel' skorosti - combined airspeed indicator

UUAP

Ukazatel Uglov Ataki i Peregruzki – combined AOA and g indicator indicator

UUT

Ookazaht' Oogla Tangazha – pitch angle indicator

UVPD

Ookazahtel' Vysoty i Perepahda Davleniya – cockpit altitude and pressure indicator

VAR

Variometr - vertical speed indicator / variometer

VB

Vychslitel' Ballisticheskiy – ballistics computer

VD

- altimeter

VDI

- two-needle altimeter

VGS

- sonobuoy system

VK

- correction switch

VKR-S

Vychislitel' Kriticheskikh rezheemov - dangerous flight modes computer

VMSh

Vremennoy Mekhanizm Shtoormovika – attack release timing mechanism

VSP

- speed altitude auto-hold module

VT

- altimeter

VTF

- altimeter
