= Glossary of Russian and USSR aviation acronyms: Miscellaneous =

This is a glossary of acronyms and initials used for miscellaneous items, materials and nicknames in the Russian Federation and formerly the USSR. The Latin-alphabet names are phonetic representations of the Cyrillic originals, and variations are inevitable.

== Miscellaneous ==
1923 All-Union Glider Meet

Koktebel, Ukraine

1924 All-Union Glider Meet

Koktebel, Ukraine

AK

Azotnaya Kislota – nitric acid

AMG

Aviatsionnoye Mahslo Ghidravlicheskoye – hydraulic fluid

AP

Aviatsionnye Pravila – aviation regulations

AS

Enamel [surface finish]

BDD

Bombardirovshchik Dal'nevo Deystviya – bomber long range specification

Bespilotnaya Tekhnika

unmanned air vehicles

Burlaki

Towed escort fighter research programme

BV

[stend] Bombovovo Vo'oroozheniya – bomb-loading test stand Myasischev Izdeliye M test stand.

СССР

Soyuz Sovetskikh Sotsialisticheskikh Respublik – USSR union of soviet socialist republics

Dubler

understudy (second prototype)

Dozapravka

refuelling

EKh

aircraft ramp launcher for SM-30

eksportny

for export

etalon

pre-production

Forsahzhem

with afterburning

Gosudarstvennye Isputaniya

state acceptance tests

IKAR

Izmeritel'nyy Kompleks Aerogheograficheskoy Razvedki – aerogeographical prospecting measurement suite

Izmenyonnoye

altered

Katapool'teeruyennyy

catapult launched

KME

Komsomol'sko-Molodyozhnyy Ekipazh – Komsomol youth crew

Komsomolyets

communist

Kryl'ya

wings (aviation technical clubs

krylo pervoy redaktsii

first edition wings (for MiG-23)

KShM

Kommandno-Shtabnoy Modool – command and headquarters module

KVLT

Klimovskiy Vektor Tyaghi – Klimov's vectored thrust

Letayuschchiye Leghendy

flying legends airshow – Monino

LFI

Lyohkiy Frontovoy Istrebitel – light tactical fighter requirement

LSSh

Lyohkiy Samolyot-Shtoormovik – light attack aircraft) requirement

MFI

Mnogofunktsion-al'nyy Istrebitel – multifunctional fighter requirement

MS-21

Maghistrahl'niy Samolyot Dvadtsat' Pervogo Veka – airliner of the 21st century short haul airliner family/projects

Muskulolyet

muscle-power-driven aircraft

MVL

Mesnye Vozdooshnyye Linii – civilian air routes

Moskva

Moscow

NTTM

Naoochno-Tekhnicheskoye Tvorchestvo Molodyozhi – Scientific and Technical Achievements of Young Specialists Science fair

OTTT

Obshchiye Taktiko-Teknicheskiye Trebovaniya – general operational requirement military specification

PAK DA

(Russian: Перспективный авиационный комплекс дальней авиации, Perspektivnyi Aviatsionnyi Kompleks Dalney Aviatsyi - Future Air Complex for Strategic Air Forces)

PAK FA

(Russian: Перспективный авиационный комплекс фронтовой авиации, Perspektivny aviatsionny kompleks frontovoy aviatsii - Future Frontline Aircraft System for Frontal Aviation), 5th generation fighter programme Su-57

Perestroika

PFI

Perspektivnyy Frontovoy Istrebitel' – advanced tactical fighter GOR general operational requirement

PLMI

Perspektivnyy Lyohkiy Massovyy Istrebitel' – advanced mass-produced light fighter GOR general operational requirement became LFI

PT

Perekhvahtchik s Treugol'nym [Krylom] – delta-wing interceptor In-house sukhoi project prefix

PU

Pooskovoye Oostroystvo [dlya SM] tridtsat – ramp launcher [for Izdeliye SM-30]

Pushka

cannon

Redahnnaya Komponovka

step arrangement

RNS

Raketa-Nositel' Samolyotnaya – air-launched space launch vehicle MiG-31

Roosskiye Vitazi

Russian Knights Aerobatic Team

S

(prefix) Strelovidnoye [krylo] – swept/arrow wings Sukhoi Project prefix

Salon Glavno Passazheera

main passenger cabin

Sdoov Pogranichnovo Sloya

boundary layer blowing/control

Sekretno

classified

Severnyy Zavod

northern plant/factory

SOK-UBD

Sistema Obyektivnovo Kontrolya Oochebno-Boyevykh Deystviy – combat training objective assessment system test equipment for MiG-31

Sparennoye Oopravleniye

dual controls

Spetspodveski

special external stores (externally carried nuclear weapons)

Spetspodveska

special slung load (nuclear)

SPS-1

Sverkhzvookovoy Passazheerskiy Samolyot Pervovo Pokoleniya – first-generation supersonic airliner

SM

Stend Morornyy – engine test rig section of Izdeliye M wing and fuselage with two engines and representative fuel system for ground running and fuel system tests.

Strelovidnoye Krylo

swept wings

SZ

Stalinskoye Zadanye – Stalins assignment

T

(prefix) Treugol'noye [Krylo] – delta wings Sukhoi projects prefix

TG

Toplivo Ghipergolicheskoye – hypergolic fuel (self igniting)

TTT

Taktiko-Teknicheskiye Trebovaniya – tactical/technical requirements military specification

Obogrev [Oroozhiya]

Weapons Heating

UAK

Ooniversahl'nyy Aviatsionnyy Konteyner – cargo container

UTS

Oochebnotrenirovochnyy Samolyot – conversion/proficiency trainer requirement

Oopravleniye

guidance

Oopravlyayemoye Oroozhiye

movable armament

PKU

Pogroozochnokozlovoye Oostroystvo – cargo handling gantry crane

Val'ozhka

low altitude Val'ozhka was sudden wing drop due to asymmetric torsional stiffness of the wings, high altitude Val'ozhka was caused by aerodynamic asymmetry (called Phantom Diver in RAF – un-commanded wing drop at high speeds

VDNKh

Vystavka Dostizheniy Narodnovo Khozlaystva – national economy achievements exhibition

VNLGSS

Vremennyye Normy Lyotnoy Godnosti Sverkhzvookovykh Samolyotov – airworthiness regulations for supersonic aircraft

Zavodskiye ispytaniya

manufacturers development tests

Znamya truda

Banner of Labour

Zvyozdnyy Gorodok

Star Town

== Materials ==
AB

Aviatsionnaya Bronya – aviation armour Nickel/Molybdenum/Steel alloy

AK4

Aluminium alloy

AK6

Aluminium alloy

AL

Aluminiy Liteynyy – Aluminium Alloy [optimised for casting]

D16T

Duralumin [Aluminium Alloy]

D16A-TV

Duralumin [Aluminium Alloy]

Delta drevesina

Birch veneers, impregnated with phenolic resin, layered in a mould and formed under pressure at 150degC

Enerzh

stainless steel

KhGSA

Nickel/Chrome/steel alloys

KhMA

Chromium/Molybdenum/steel alloys

KhNZA

Chromium/Manganese/Silicon/steel alloys

M

mild steel

MA8

Magnesium alloy

ML

Magnesium alloy

ML5-T4

Magnesium alloy

MS

mild steel

OT

Titanium alloy

Shpon

Birch veneers layered and glued over a mould using casein or albumen glues

V93

Aluminium alloy forgings

V95A-T

Aluminium alloy)

VT

V high-strength Titanium alloy

== Nicknames ==
These nicknames are used for aircraft, and/or aircraft equipment, either officially in the case of avionics or unofficially for other equipment.

Aist

Stork

Akula

Shark

Almaz

Diamond

Ametist

Amethyst

Amur

Analog

Analogue

Argon

Argon

Arlekin

Harlequin

Atlant

Atlas

Azaliya

Azalea

Baget

Picture frame

Bahboochka

Butterfly

Baklan

Cormorant

Baku

Bar'yer

Barrier

Barometr

Barometer

Bars

Snow Leopard

Bary

Barium

Baza

Base

Bereg

Shore

Berkut

Russian: Беркут, romanized: Berkut, lit. 'Golden Eagle'

Beryoza

Birch Tree

Biryuza

Turquoise

Bizon

Bison

Blokha

Flea

Booket

Bouquet

Boonker

Bunker

Boorya

Storm

Bulet

Damask steel

Buran

"Бура́н" meaning "Snowstorm" or "Blizzard"

Buratino

[Pinocchio]

Burlaki

Chaika

Seagull

Chemodan

Suitcase

Chornoye More

Black Sea

Dooglasyonok

baby Douglas

Doroga

Road

Droozhba

Friendship

Dub

Oak

Dyatel

Woodpecker

Dyevushkovaya Mashina

Girls Machine (Grigorovich E-2 (DG-55)

Efir

Ether

Ekrahn

Screen

Ekrahnoplan

Screen Wing

Emblema

Emblem

Evkalipt

Eucalyptus

Fantazmagoriya

Phantasmagoria

Fasol'

String Bean

Filin

Horned Owl

Fleyta

Flute

Fone

Background

Fregat

Frigate Bird?

Fregaht

Frigate

Gagara

Loon

Gardeniya

Gardenia

Gastronom

Food store/Pantry

Gheliy

Helium

Geran

Geranium

Globus

Globe

Golovastik

Tadpole

Gorbatyy

Hunchback

Gorizont

Horizon

Grad

Hail

Gratch

Rook

Groza

Thunderstorm

Gyunesh

(Azerbaijani) Sun

Igla

Needle

Ilem

Elm

Ingool

[river]

Initsiativa

Initiative

Inzheer

Fig

Iskra

Spark

Ivolga

Golden Oriole

Izumrud

Emerald

Kaira

Great Auk

Kalibrovshchik

Calibrator

Kaplya

Drop of liquid

Kara

retribution

Karas

Crucian

Kaskad

Cascade

Katyusha

"Катюша" meaning 'little Katy'

Kedr

Cedar

Khod

motion

Kholod

Cold

Khrizantema

Chrysanthemum

Khrom

Chrome

Khrom-Nikel

Nickel-Chromium

Khvadrat

Square

Kinzhal

Dagger

Klen

Maple

Klyon

Maple

Kobal't

Cobalt

Komar

Mosquito

Kometa

Comet

Kommunar

Commune Worker

Konus

Cone

Koob

Cube

Koopol

Cupola

Koors

Heading

Kop'yo

Spear

Korall

Coral

Korshoon

Kite (bird

Krahsnyy Krest

Red Cross

Krahsnyy Oktyaby

Red October

Krechyet

Gerfalcon

Kremniy

Silicon

Kristall

Crystal

Kukurachka

Kukurooza

Corn

Kukurooznik

[slang] Corn-Duster

Kur'yer

Courier

Kvant

Quantum

Kvadraht

Square

Kvitok

Receipt (colloquial – Kvitahntsiya)

Landysh

Lily of the Valley

Lastochka

Swallow

Latyshskiy Strelok

Latvian Rifleman

Lazur

Azure/Prussian Blue

Ledoboy

Ice Smasher

Leera

Lyre

Letayushchaya Trooba

flying tube

Liana

Liana Creeper

Limuzin

Limousine

Lira

Litiy

Lithium

Lotos

Lotus

Luch

Beam

Luna

Lunar

Lyutik

Buttercup

Magniy

Magnesium

Mak

poppy

Makaka

Macaque (monkey)

Makhovik

Flywheel

Malyutka

Little one / baby

Mangoosta

Mongoose

Manyovr

Manoeuver

Marshroot

Route

Materik

Continent

Mayak

Beacon

Mech

Sword

Merkur

Mercury

Metel

Snowstorm

Meteor

Meteor

Meteorit

Meteorite

Mikron

micron

Mindahl'

Almond

Mir

world

Molniya

Lightning

Morskoy Zmey

sea dragon

Moskva

Moscow

Moskit

Mosquito

Mozhzhevel'nik

Juniper

Naooka

Nel'mo

Neon

Neon

Nit'

Thread

Nozhee

Knives trim tabs

Ogonyok

Little Light

Oka

a Russian river

Okean

Ocean

Ol'kha

Alder

Opyt

Experience / experiment

Orbita

Orel

Eagle

Oryol

Eagle

Osa

Wasp

Pantera

Panther

Parol

Password

Paroos

Sail

Peleng

Bearing

Pelikahn

Pelican

Persey

Perseus

Pion

Peony

Pionyer

Pioneer*Pchel – Bee

Pionerskaya Pravda

Pioneers Truth

Plamya

Flame

Pogahnka

Toadstool

Pogoda

Weather

Polyot

Flight

Potok

Stream

Preriya

Prairie

Pritok

Tributary

Privod

Drive

Prizma

Prism

Promor

person who lives by the sea

Prostor

Expanse

Prozhektor

Searchlight

Ptchel

Bee

Ptchelka

Little Bee

Puma

Puma

Put'

Path/Way

Pyatidesyatka

the Fifty

Quantum

Quantum

Radal'

a contraction of Rahdiodal'nomer (radio rangefinder

Radikal

Radical

Rahdooga

Rainbow

Rech

Speech

Redhan

Planing Step

Relyef

Terrain

Rezeda

Mignonette

Rhoomb

compass point

Rodina

Motherland

Romb

Rhombus

Rubin

Ruby

Ruslan

Ruslan (Russian legendary warrior)

Rosseeya

Russia

Sablya

sabre

Sapfeer

Sapphire

Samotsvet

Gem (old Russian

Seeren

Lilac

Serpey

(meaning not known – used for airborne delivered mine

Sfera

Sphere

Shar

Ball/Balloon

Shestikrylyy Serafim

six-winged Seraph

Shkval

Squall

Shompol

Ramrod

Shpil

Spire

Shtik

Bayonet

Shtyr

Rod

Skal'pel

Scalpel

Sibiryak

Siberian Inhabitant

Sirena

Siren

Skif

Scythian

Skvorets

Starling

Smerch

Tornado/Whirlwind

Sobol

Sable

Sokol

Falcon

Sopka

Hill

Sorbitsiya

break-off/mis-carry/abort

Soyuz

Union

Sparka

twin/coupled/tandem probably derived from Sparennoye Oopravleniye – dual controls

{{{1}}}

Rescue Worker

Spektr

Spectrum

Standart

Standard

Strela

Arrow

Stroona

String

Svod

Vault/dome

Tabletka

Pill/Tablet

Taifun

Typhoon

Tangazh

Pitch [angle]

Tarahn

Ramming attack

Tigr

Tiger

Topaz

Yopaz

Toros

Ice Hummock

Tochnost'

Accuracy

Ton

Tone

Toriy

Thorium

Trapetsiya

Trapeze

Trassa

Route

Tropik

Tropic

Troyanda

(Ukrainian)Rose

Tsifra

number

Tsiklon

Cyclone

Urugan

Hurricane

Utka/Ootka

Duck

Ookraïna

Ukraine (Ukrainian?)

Ookrop

Dill

Ootyonok

Duckling

Uzel

Knot

V'yuga

Blizzard

Veyer

Fan

Vezdelyot

fly anywhere aircraft/omniflyer

Vikhr

Vortex

Virazh

Turn

Vishnya

Cherry

Vita

Life(Ukrainian?

Voskhod

Sunrise

Vostok

East

Vozdukh

Air

Vozdooshnyy Ford

Aerial Ford Yakovlev AIR-5 with cabin

Vstrecha

Rendezvous

Vyaz

Elm

Vysota

Altitude

Yakor

Anchor

Yantar

Amber

Yedinorog

Unicorn

Yupiter

Jupiter

Yadro

Kernel

Yolka

Fir

Zagon

Coral

Zarevo

Glow

Zarya

Dawn

Zaslon

Shield/barrier

Zebra

Zebra

Zhuk

Beetle

Zhuravl

Crane [bird]

Zima

Winter

Zlotoi Orel

Golden Eagle

Znamya Truda

Banner of Labour

Zvezda

Star
